= Dilakian Brothers =

New York-based artists and animators

Hovik Dilakian and Gagik Dilakian
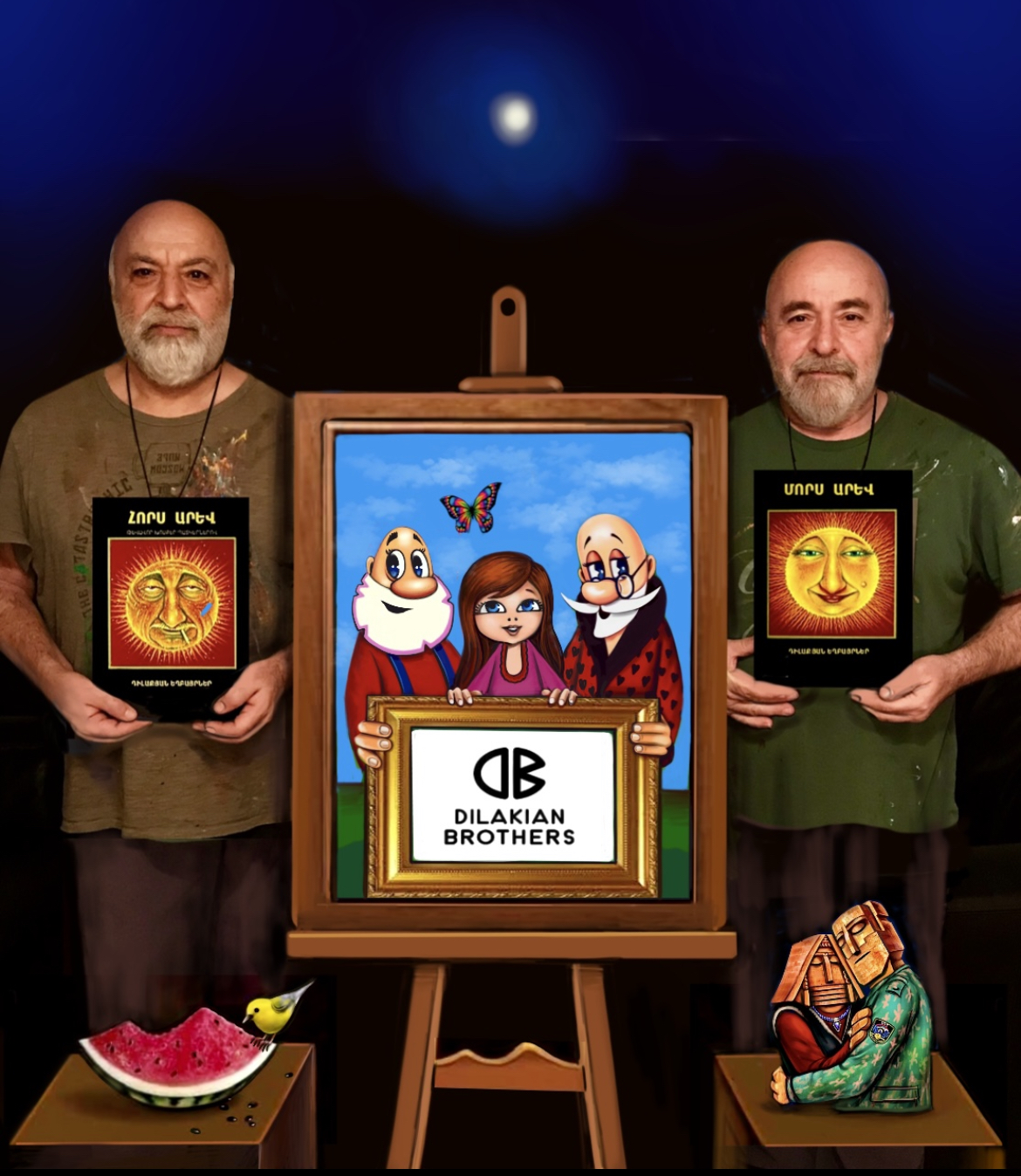
- The Dilakian Brothers in 2021
- Born: 1950 (age 75–76) (Hovik); 1951 (age 74–75) (Gagik); Yerevan, Armenia
- Citizenship: Americans
- Occupations: artists and animators

The Dilakian brothers, Hovik Dilakian and Gagik Dilakian, (Armenian: Դիլաքյան եղբայրներ, Հովիկ Դիլաքյան, Գագիկ Դիլաքյան) are New York-based artists and animators of Armenian descent, sons of Tatul Dilakyan, People's Artist of the Armenian SSR.

== Biography ==
The Dilakian brothers were born in Yerevan – Hovik in 1950 and Gagik in 1951.

One of the Dilakian brothers' works is the children's animated film Found Dream, which was created in 1976 and is still being shown today.

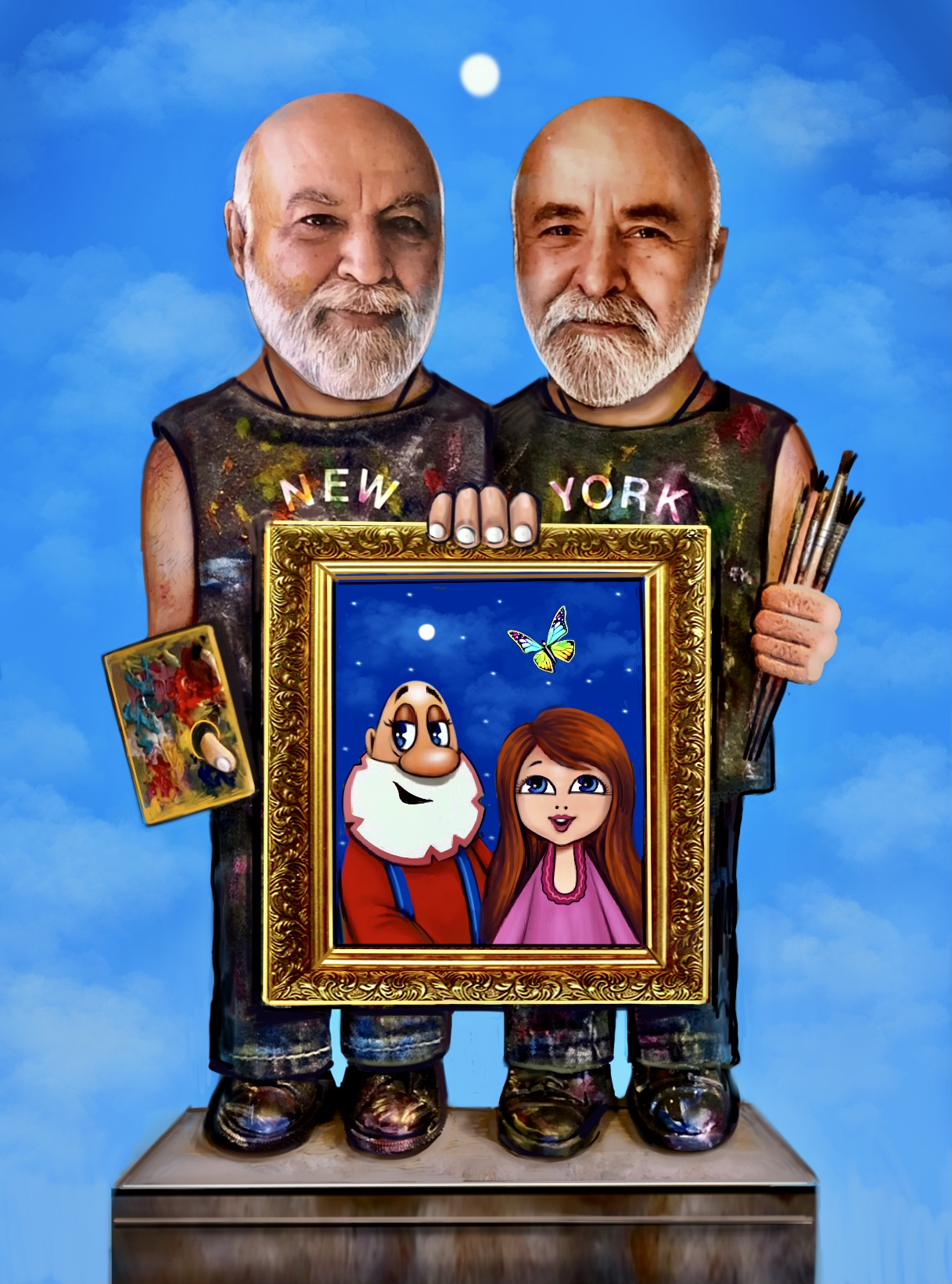

Before creating the Found Dream cartoon, the brothers worked at the "Hayfilm" film studio, participating in the production processes of various films and animated movies of the time – including the animation Fox Book, based on the fables of Vardan Aygektsi and Mkhitar Gosh, where Hovik served as the film's art director.

Several years before Armenia's independence, the artist brothers moved to the United States and continued their collaborative work in their art studio located in Harlem, where their works were created and exhibited.

Behind the Brush is a series of three-dimensional artworks created by the artists which combine elements of biography, art history, and imagination, offering a unique look at both the artists and their most iconic works. The series imagines the studios and daily lives of famous painters such as Salvador Dalí, Vincent van Gogh, and Arshile Gorky etc. In each piece, the artists recreate well-known paintings by these figures, adding their own creative style and interpretation.The goal of the series is to bring viewers closer to the everyday life and creative world of these artists.

AraArt series features depictions of Mount Ararat.

During the 44-day war, the Dilakian brothers presented illustrated versions of the famous We Are Our Mountains monument of Artsakh. On that occasion, in 2022, an exhibition was held in Yerevan where the brothers presented their works.

The Dilakian brothers regularly visit Armenia and showcase their works.

== Gallery ==
=== Ararat series ===
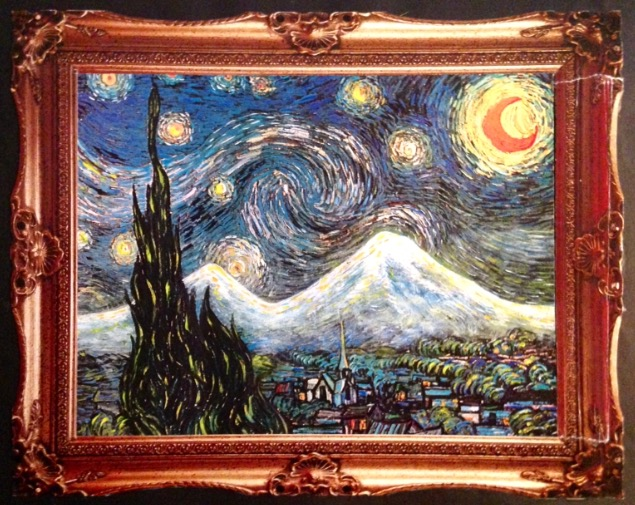
