= Vardan Areveltsi =

Armenian scholar (1198–1271)

- Born: c. 1198; Gandzak
- Died: 1271; Khor Virap
- Other names: Vardan Mec
- Education: Goshavank, Khornashat Monastery
- Occupations: Historian, geographer, philosopher
- Known for: Historical Compilation

Vardan Areveltsi (Armenian: Վարդան Արևելցի; Vardan the Easterner, c. 1198 – 1271 AD) was a medieval Armenian historian, geographer, philosopher and translator. In addition to establishing numerous schools and monasteries, he also left behind a rich contribution to Armenian literature. He is known for writing the Historical Compilation (Havak'umn Patmuc'yan), one of the first ever attempts to write a history of the world by an Armenian historian.

== Biography ==
=== Early life ===
Vardan was born in Gandzak in 1198. He received his education at a school in Gandzak and at Nor Getik Monastery (later known as Goshavank), where he was student of the prominent scholar Mkhitar Gosh. He continued his studies at the Khornashat monastery in Tavush, learning literature, grammar, and theology. He also learned several languages while at Khornashat, mastering Hebrew, Greek, Latin and Persian. In 1235, Vardan became a vardapet and put his experience in education into action: he opened a school at St. Andre monastery in Kayenaberd and taught there from 1235 to 1239 and from 1252 to 1255. In 1239, he left Armenia for Jerusalem and on his return journey, traveled through the Armenian Kingdom of Cilicia, where he was a guest in the royal court of Het'um I. He remained in Cilicia long enough to participate in the 1243 ecumenical council in the capital at Sis. Vardan returned home in 1245, bringing along with him the canon laws that were decided upon at Sis.

=== Educational and ecclesiastical activity ===
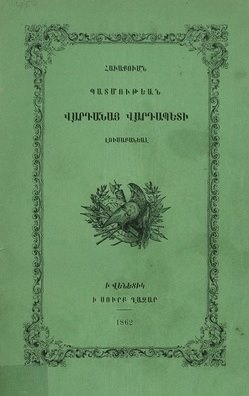
Publishing of "Historical Compilation", Venice, 1862

Three years later, Vardan traveled to the Cilician Armenia once more, this time participating in the governmental and social affairs of the kingdom. He was a fierce opponent of what he saw as the encroachment of the Eastern Orthodox Byzantine and Catholic churches in Cilician Armenia and fought diligently to counter their influences. While in Cilicia, Vardan also worked with Catholicos Constantine Bardzraberdtsi to write an ecclesiastical treatise entitled "Didactic Paper", which was intended for use in eastern Armenia. His religious activities also included writing a letter to the Pope in regards to the latter's attempts to extend Catholicism in the kingdom and his participation in another ecumenical council in 1251 in Sis.

In 1252, Vardan returned to Armenia and began organizing an ecumenical council that would convene in Haghpat and Dzagavan. Returning to educational life, he also established institutions for learning at the monasteries of Saghmosavank, Teghenyats, Aghjots, and Khorakert. He remained an instructor at Haghpat for several years until 1255, when he traveled to Khor Virap, establishing a seminary there. At Khor Virap, he introduced a curriculum which included philosophy, logic, oratory, and grammar. Many of his pupils went on to become notable Armenian intellectuals, including Gevork Skevṛatsi, Hovhannes Yerznkatsi, Nerses Mshetsi, and Grigor Bjnetsi. In 1264, Vardan also played an important role as a negotiator when he went to Tabriz, where the Mongol leader Hulagu Khan was residing. He brokered an agreement which gave special privileges to the Armenians living under the yoke of the Mongol Empire and settled a deal on the collection of levies and taxes. Vardan's ties with the Mongols were especially intimate, as he was allowed to become the religious adviser of Hulagu Khan's wife, Doquz Khatun, who happened to be a Nestorian Christian.

Vardan died in 1271 in Khor Virap, bequeathing a significant literary legacy which encompassed Armenia's political, cultural, religious, and social lives.

== Works ==
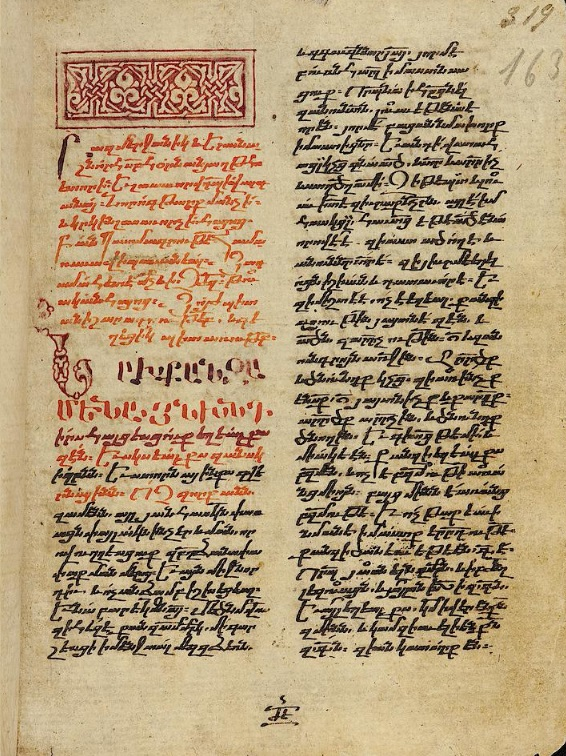
A page from Areveltsi's "Historical Compilation", manuscript of 1432

Over 120 works attributed to Vardan Areveltsi have been preserved. Among his most significant works is a 66 item collection called Lutsmunk i Surb Grots (better known as Zhghlank, or Chats), which was written at the request of King Het'um I. It is written in the vernacular tongue, making it easily comprehensible and concerns itself with many questions related to the nature of life (nature, the formation of celestial bodies, astronomy, botany and zoology, language, philosophical questions revolving around man, music, etc.). For example, a critical observation Vardan makes in this work is his expression in the belief that, "nothing outside of nature moves nor stops; motion is not solely the movement of one place to another, but an inner transformation which moves from one state to another."

However, Vardan's most important work is his Havakumn Patmutsyun (Historical Compilation). Much like Movses Khorenatsi's History of Armenia, Havakumn Patmutsyun is an attempt to trace Armenian history from its beginnings to the present day. But the work is also significant for attempting to document the history of the entire world. Starting with the Tower of Babel and the epic battle between Hayk and Bel, the history ends with the death of Constantine I Bardzraberdtsi's death in 1267. It is, however, considered more a chronicle, rather than the histories written by traditional Armenian authors. Vardan's work contains a quote, consisting of information on the Ghaznavids and Seljuqs, taken from Mkhitar of Ani's "Universal History".

Vardan wrote commentaries on biblical books, namely the Song of Songs, the Psalms and the Book of Daniel.

Vardan also translated many foreign works into Armenian. One of the most significant was Michael the Syrian's Chronicle translation in 1248 for which he could use the original manuscript of the author that had been transferred from the Mor Bar Sauma Monastery to Rumkale. The relatively free translation was produced at the request of Catholicos Constantine I of Cilicia and with the support of the Syrian philanthropist and physician Ishots, as Vardan himself would probably not have had sufficient knowledge of Syriac to undertake the translation. Other translated works included conversations and works on philosophy, theology, which were translated from Greek, Latin, and Syriac.

Below is a partial list of his works, many of which, including facsimiles, are currently preserved at the Matenadaran in Yerevan, Armenia.

- Ashkharats'uyts (Geography)
- Lutsmunk' i Surb Groc' (also known as Zhghlank)
- Havak'umn Patmucyan (Historical Compilation)
- Vark' Zardaretsin (Those who embellished)
