= Vardan of Aygek =

Armenian monk and folklorist (died c. 1250)

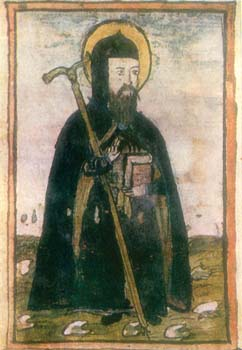
- Vardan of Aygek in a 17th-century miniature
- Born: Ma'arrata, Armenian Kingdom of Cilicia
- Died: c. 1250
- Occupation: Monk

Vardan of Aygek (Armenian: Վարդան Այգեկցի, romanized: Vardan Aygektsi), also known as Vardan of Marata (Vardan Maratatsi; died 1250), was an Armenian Christian monk, famous for his works on Armenian folklore.

== Life ==
Aygektsi was born in Ma'arrata, a village near Afrin, then located in the Armenian Kingdom of Cilicia. He was educated in the Monastery of Arkakaghin and received the title of vardapet. He first pursued his career in Amid and later near his ancestral lands.

In 1198, he took part in the coronation ceremony of King Levon II. In 1208, he started living at the monastery of Aygek on the Amanus Mountains, near the village Yenicekale, for an unknown reason.

He died in 1250.

== Works ==
His first known work is Armat Havato (lit. 'The root of faith'), which was a collection of the principles of the Armenian Apostolic Church as well as the church's position against the rulings of the Council of Chalcedon, which were becoming more influential at the time. Among his works is his Fables and a Geography, both of which have been mistakenly attributed by some to Vardan Areveltsi.

In 1668, an extensive collection of Aygektsi's fables, under the title Aghvesagirq (Book of the Fox) was published in Amsterdam. The naming of the collection was based on the fact that the key character in most of the fables was a fox.

== Modern interpretations ==
In 1825 the French academic Antoine-Jean Saint-Martin published a French translation of the Fables.

In 1975, Soviet-era director Robert Sahakyants made a 10-minute animated film, The Fox Book, based on Aigektsi's Fables. In association with the Hover Chamber Choir of Armenia, contemporary Armenian composer Stepan Babatorosyan created Six Fables, an original composition based on Aigektsi's Fables, with contemporary lyrics by Yuri Sahakyan. It won the 2004 Armenian Music Awards – Best Choir/Chorus Album. The Hover Chamber Choir of Armenia has also presented an outdoor musical-theatrical production based on Aigektsi's Fables.

== See also ==
- Mkhitar Gosh
