= The Lawcode (Datastanagirk') of Mkhitar Gosh =

Mediaeval Armenian feudal laws

The Lawcode (Datastanagirk) of Mkhitar Gosh
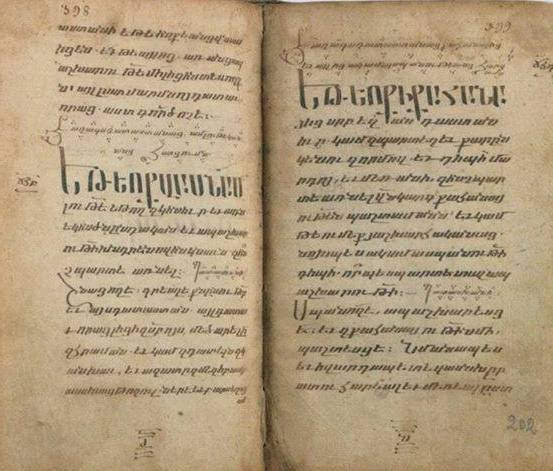
- Author: Mkhitar Gosh
- Language: hy
- Genre: Law
- Publication place: Armenia

The Lawcode [Datastanagirk'] of Mkhitar Gosh: a collection of medieval Armenian feudal laws compiled by Mkhitar Gosh in the late 12th century. Its correct title is "Book of Judgement."

In addition, Mkhitar's works included works from other authors; for example, the translations of Syriac-Roman laws in the Lawcode were not authored by Mkhitar Gosh.

During the 13th century, in the Armenian Kingdom of Cilicia, the Lawcode gained the force of law. In the 16th century, it was adopted by the Polish King Sigismund I for Armenian colonies in Lviv, Kamenets-Podolski, and other cities. Certain parts of the Lawcode were translated into Latin, Polish, and Tatar languages. In the 18th century, Mkhitar Gosh's Lawcode became part of Georgian legislation, known as Vakhtang's Code (a code of laws compiled by the King of Georgia, Vakhtang), and the code continued to be effective even after Georgia became part of Russia.

The Lawcode has been preserved in numerous Armenian manuscript sources, currently housed in the Matenadaran of Yerevan, Venice, Vienna, Beirut, Paris, and other renowned libraries and repositories.

== Manuscripts ==
The earliest copy of the Lawcode was probably rewritten during Gosh's lifetime. Perhaps two original versions have survived. Numerous manuscripts have been preserved (around 40 at the Mesrop Mashtots Institute of Ancient Manuscripts). It was written with the aim of mitigating class contradictions and fostering the national-liberation spirit of the people. Editions A, B, and C of The Lawcode are known. Edition A consists of a preface and the book of judgments itself (251 articles). Edition B is divided into secular (130 articles) and ecclesiastical parts (124 articles). Edition C is identical to edition A but is concise and differs in essence.

== 12 reasons for writing the Lawcode ==
In the introduction Mkhitar Gosh primarily discusses the significance and necessity of The Lawcode. Through his Book of Law, Mkhitar Gosh laid the foundation for the establishment and structure of the judiciary. In his discourse, Gosh referred to the existing legislative issues in Armenia. In Chapter B Mkhitar Gosh presents twelve reasons for the necessity of The Lawcode. "These twelve chapters contained the reasons for writing this book of judgments."

=== Social reason ===
Mkhitar Gosh considered the first reason to be that Muslims and other Christians believed that Armenians had no written laws. Mkhitar Gosh writes on this matter:

"Because although it was said that there was no need for the God to judge us by written letter, yet now we have resolved to do so, because many times we have heard insults not only from unbelievers but also from Christians, who say that according to the Gospel there is no judgment at all, due to the ignorance that resides within them. And because of their opinion, the disease of evil manifests twice: first, in that the legislator allegedly acted meaninglessly, and second, in that he did not want to live on par with human nations."

The second reason mentioned by Mkhitar is evil. "Secondly, by its very nature, it led evil within us according to the laws, and it gave perfection to the imperfection of the soul and gave sorrow of love instead of hatred." Mkhitar Gosh considers evil to be the foundation of many crimes. Additionally, as an educator, he always advocates for love rather than hatred in his works.

The third reason he considers is laziness, when people do not get used to laws and the requirements of society and do not realize their importance for themselves. "Thirdly, because due to lawlessness there are those who have become accustomed to the absence of laws and prophets and the Gospel, staying away from their authority, living in lawlessness, could not choose the book of judgment, which would awaken them from sleep, as if by the hand of the scripture of judgments, living meanwhile a worthy life."

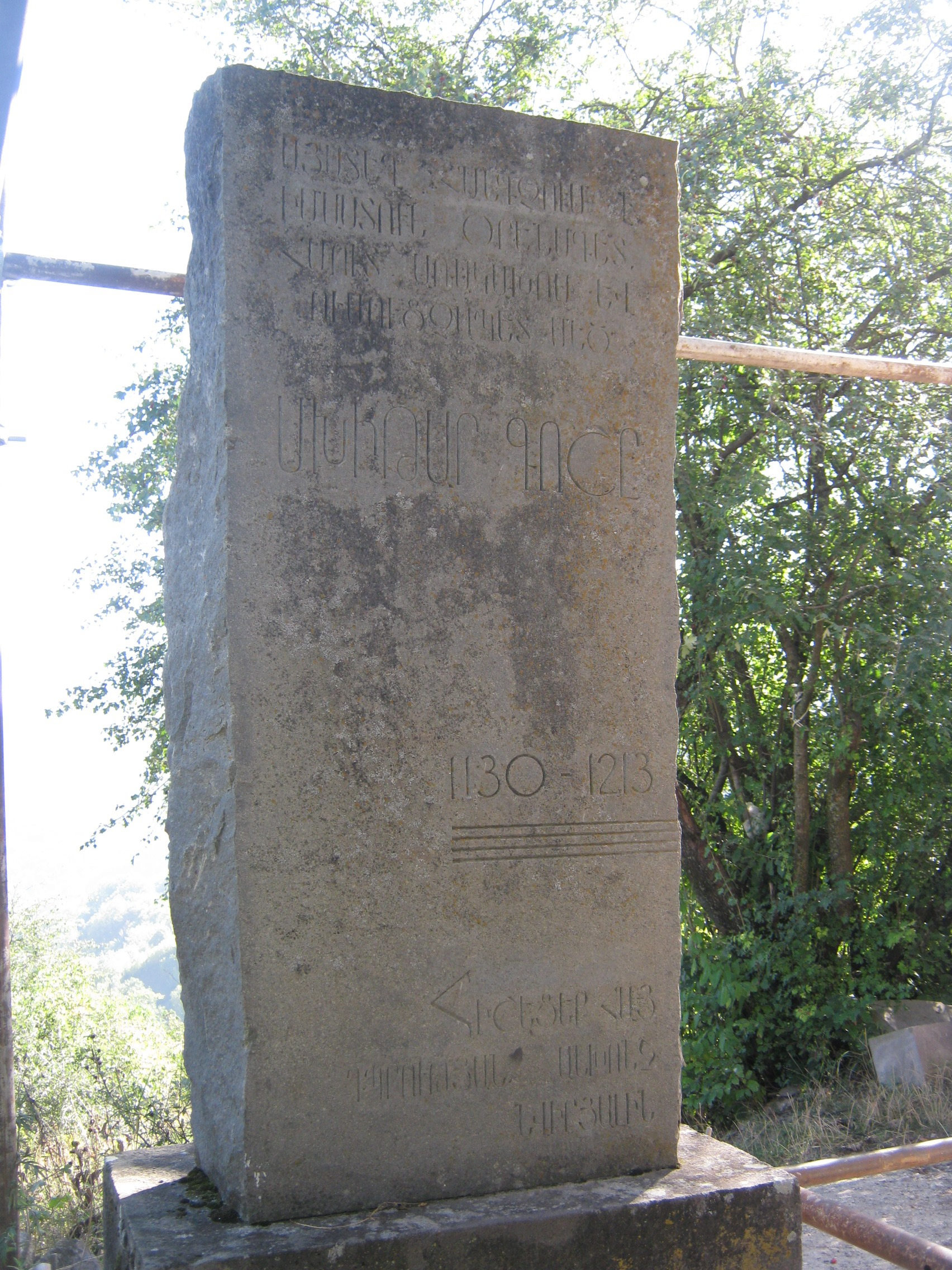
The tombstone of Mkhitar Gosh

The fourth reason was the lack of education, which over time became a significant problem leading to the absence of skills and experience, and Gosh points out that the requirements and circumstances have changed, and it is no longer possible to rely on prophetic and gospel laws. "Fourthly, because skills and experience diminished over time and among nations, and worlds changed due to contingencies and did not abide by the laws, prophets, and the Gospel."

The fifth reason was that the Holy Spirit ceased to influence people's lives. Gosh notes that the absence of the influence of the Holy Spirit leads people to establish written laws and violate them. "Fifthly, in the past, the Holy Spirit influenced people and contributed to the fulfillment of true judgment. The Spirit was a law written in the hearts of people, so there was no need for a written law. Now, when the Holy Spirit does not have such influence and people have 'run away' from Christian brotherhood, orthodoxy, and 'for this reason, you have been compelled to write' Lawcode."

The sixth reason, according to Gosh, is that human morality has declined, and swearing has become the primary means of impurity. "Sixthly, because the reality of judgment leads to swearing, which the God did not allow, but which believers now often abuse in every case and wild judgments, with or without condemnation. Based on these realities, we have decided not to disregard the God's command but to establish laws and rules of judgment to address issues and, if necessary, to forgive during the trial."

The seventh reason, according to Gosh, is that Christians, lacking written provisions on crimes and judgments, resort to Muslim courts where bribery is entrenched. "Seventhly, since there is no written judgment, Christians go and resort to unbelievers, following the reproach of the prophet, 'Is there no God in Israel that you go to inquire of Baal-Zebub, the god of Ekron?'. On this account, the apostle reproaches, saying, 'And brother goes to law against brother, and that before unbelievers'."

=== Christian reasons ===
The eighth reason is that Christian courts are also full of corrupt bishops, priests, and laypeople who, due to ignorance, are unable to deliver just judgments. "Eighthly, and now we see that there are many bishops, teachers, priests, and prominent laypeople who, for the sake of bribes and ignorance, pervert true judgments. And for all these reasons, we have agreed to write a book of judgments."

The ninth reason: "Ninthly, because, based on human nature, no matter how many souls or people of different occupations or dreams we wish to pass a direct judgment on, we will not be able to do so due to forgetfulness, and even if we did, we would later return with regret and say: did we pass a fair judgment or not?"

The tenth reason: "Tenthly, because when the God created Adam, with each passing day the grace of the Holy Spirit strengthened upon us. And the devil said that the Holy Spirit did not remain with people because of their sins when they sinned in the paradise of God."

The eleventh reason: "Eleventhly, because judges always fear God; they know that they will stand before the heavenly judge, so let them administer justice to people in true and direct manner."

The twelfth reason: "Twelfthly, and people appearing before the judge fear God and do not bribe judges or allow them to evade true judgment, because the All-Knowing God sees their deeds, and we will all stand before Him in judgment."

== Gosh' concept of state sovereignty in Lawcode ==
In his collection of laws, Gosh devotes much space to state sovereignty and the concept of state formation expressed in his laws. Through these laws, Gosh sought to encourage Armenian lords and the people to restore state independence. He considered the king the head of the state, who should have all the levers of sole governance. The second law, by right, is one of the most interesting, as Gosh talks about taxing other countries and subjugating other peoples and about not being enslaved, and this at a time when the orphaned Armenian people were under the influence of foreign states. One of the important characteristics of sovereignty, according to Gosh, is the supremacy of the state over subject peoples and complete independence in foreign relations. The state must have full control over internal affairs.

Having a profound understanding of Armenian history, Gosh regarded the unification of internal forces around a common idea as the most important circumstance for the restoration of Armenian independence. That's why Gosh was always angered by the villains who oppressed the peasants living in their domains. Gosh believed that the only way to restore national independence was through a national liberation struggle. Speaking about the king's powers, Gosh notes that the king must have absolute authority both domestically and in the conduct of foreign relations. Gosh asserts that the king should have the right only to build fortresses and castles; the ruler can only declare war or make peace.

One of the guarantees of a strong monarchy is the regulation of the inheritance system. Gosh notes that the state needs a system for choosing an heir to the throne, which will allow it to have an integrated state system. According to him, the question of appointing the firstborn as the heir to the throne arises from the history of the Armenian people.

Thus, Gosh presents a system that later allows many kingdoms to maintain their sovereignty and rely on the civilian population, enabling them to retain control of the country for as long as possible. However, as Gosh points out, everything is ephemeral, even kingdoms and kings.

== Human rights ==
Currently, human beings are recognized as the highest value, and one of the most significant achievements of the present era is the definition and ranking of human rights.

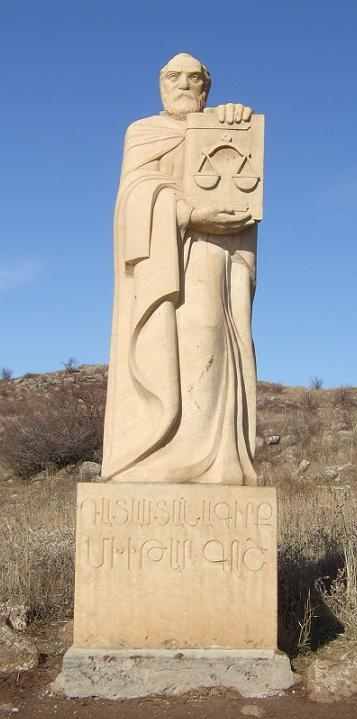
The Lawcode (Datastanagirk') of Mkhitar Gosh

The protection and definition of human rights have become key elements of the ideology of modern states. The fundamental ideology of contemporary social structures, democracy, is based on the ideology of human rights and human dignity.

The issue of human rights has always been at the forefront of the attention of philosophers and political scientists. Gosh based the protection of human rights on the individual who inherently required safeguarding of their rights. By advancing the conventional principles of his time, Gosh sought to shed light on the national liberation struggle. This was a crucial step in disseminating the Judicial Book among the lower classes of society. From this perspective, it was Gosh who emphasized the official format of the "Judicial Book." Gosh understood well that without a clear state ideology and system, it is difficult to preserve the state as a high value for individuals and society. Gosh entrusted the protection of individual rights to the state with the aim of preserving the image of Armenians as a unified heritage.

Before Gosh, there were many descriptions of natural law, but he elevated it to a higher level by formulating natural law as a truth originally obtained from God, which needed to be preserved and passed down from generation to generation. In his opinion, it is up to humans to act justly and virtuously, and by their nature, people are free and equal. Natural law embodies the rights of divine justice, freedom, and equality, which are eternal, universal values that remain unchanged.

The written laws by which people must govern are based on natural law, establishing justice, maintaining peace, and preserving rights. This is why natural law and positive law within a state cannot be opposed. Positive law is a logical extension of natural law in society. It must align with divine law, the idea of equality, freedom, and justice. In this regard, Gosh made significant ideological progress, as previously the law protected not the individual, but a certain personality linked to their social status. Gosh transferred the idea of equality among people into the legislative field, defining a set of norms that truly equated people and individuals in positive law. However, this doesn't mean that Gosh goes against authoritarian ideology or eliminates conflicts between people and individuals in law, but his ideas stand out for their progressiveness and humanity.

Gosh's humanitarian views are primarily evident in his passages about the right to life. His negative attitude towards the capital punishment already demonstrates his humanity. Importantly, he envisions the correction of errors made by individuals. By proposing that criminals should repay their debt to society, he advocates for using criminals to obtain societal benefits. However, even here, Gosh's image as a pro-state actor is reflected. He believes that traitors who surrender fortresses or open city gates to the enemy deserve death without mercy. Gosh's humanitarian perspective lies in his efforts to achieve the removal of certain bodyparts instead of executions, which would give them the opportunity to repent. This form of punishment was particularly accepted among Muslims. At a time when Christians ruthlessly executed each other, and Muslims conducted amputations, which many people regretted, they nevertheless contributed in one way or another to the progress of society.

According to Gosh, intentional murder can serve as grounds for the Capital punishment. From this perspective, one can mention medieval theological views in the works of Mkhitar, one of the important features of which is the capital punishment prescribed for intentional murder. Non-believers (non-Christians) who commit intentional murder should be executed without distinction, while Christians should be investigated and given the opportunity to repent. Speaking of repentance, he cites the New Testament and asserts that everyone has the right to repentance.

== As a law ==
The sources of the Lawcode include the Mosaic Laws (Ten Commandments), Armenian canonical law, and Armenian customary law. It encompasses all branches and institutions of feudal law, as well as various spheres of social relations. As a typical feudal code, it reinforces dominant orders and class privileges, protecting ecclesiastical rights. According to the "Datastanagirk," the judicial system comprised state courts (royal, princely, lower), feudal courts (manorial, class-based), corporate courts (communal, cooperative, fraternal), church courts (catholic, episcopal, catechetical), and extraordinary courts. The judicial process was accusatorial-adversarial, with minimal formality. Proceedings commenced upon the complaint of a private accuser (plaintiff), while authorities initiated trials in rare cases. Judicial evidence included confession, witness testimony, oath (in certain cases), written documents, and expert opinions. Any action against existing social relations, the state, governance, property, life and health, the church, or dominant ideology was considered a crime. The causes of criminality, both in Armenia and elsewhere, were primarily socio-economic, although Lawcode also attributed factors such as human rationality and weakened religious fervor, leading to moral decay. Prior to the Middle Ages, insects, animals, and even inanimate objects were considered criminals. Based on the principle of subjective culpability, Lawcode deems sin worthy of condemnation not for the act itself but for the act committed. According to the Datastanagirk, insanity also constitutes a circumstance excluding judicial liability.

=== Marital relationship ===
The establishment of marital relations between a woman and a man was an important guarantee from the perspective of legal development. According to Gosh, the marital age for a wife was 15 years. If a marriage was contracted against her will, it was considered that the woman was forced into marriage, and such a marriage was deemed involuntary, thus the woman could be divorced. This approach was of fundamental significance because marriage was a voluntary union, and a woman could not be coerced.

In marital relations, Gosh adhered to the principle of monogamy, considering bigamy and polygamy punishable. However, both men and women were allowed to enter into marriage a second time, and in exceptional cases, even a third time.

The Lawcode prohibited violence against women. A husband had no right to inflict bodily harm on his wife; otherwise, he should be punished with a double fine prescribed for such actions. If the husband repeated his actions after the fine and endangered the wife's health, she had the right to divorce.

Mkhitar Gosh raised a unique issue that we will not find in other medieval sources, namely the establishment of property equality between men and women.

A woman had the right to independently dispose of her property. She could bequeath her property at her discretion. Her children inherited her property regardless of their inheritance from their father. Such an approach to women was a progressive step for that period.

=== The problem of heredity ===
Speaking about the inheritance rights of children, the author pays special attention to disabled children. He distinguishes between two types of disability: intellectual and physical. The former are deprived of intellect and are unable to manage inheritance, thus cannot be heirs. Gosh believed that after the father's death, the main title of the household traditionally passes to the eldest son, and if, due to his death or for other reasons, he is unable to fulfill his duties, it should pass by inheritance to the second son or the next heir. Mkhitar believed that the inheritance title should not be left vacant, as it could have serious consequences for the state or government.

Gosh advocated for regulating many laws by customary force if they could be implemented, and in case of impossibility, he proposed using the experience of other countries. According to Gosh, those laws that have a direct relation to the state structure and issues of utmost importance for the state should be regulated by customary force.

== Punishments ==
In the Lawcode, sin is perceived in two senses: religious and legal: the former as a violation of God's law, the latter as the legality established by humans. Acknowledging that sin in the legal sense is simultaneously sin in the religious sense (although not always), Mkhitar Gosh accordingly envisages two types of punishment: spiritual-church and physical. The former implied only ecclesiastical courts, while the latter secular courts. Mkhitar Gosh accepted the following punishments: spiritual-church (exile, anathema, various forms of repentance, demotion, dismissal), physical-material: capital punishment, corporal punishments (beating, amputation), deprivation or restriction of freedom, property-fines. Establishing that the effectiveness of punishment is not determined by severity, Mkhitar Gosh adopts the progressive principle for his time of the correlation between the crime and the punishment, "and the punishment must be commensurate with the damage".

It is one of the most significant legal monuments of Armenian political and legal thought and of the Middle Ages in general, containing many advanced provisions for its time, which are still relevant today. For example, Mkhitar Gosh believes that the purpose of punishment should not be torture and revenge, but discipline, correction and education.

== Personal and property relations ==
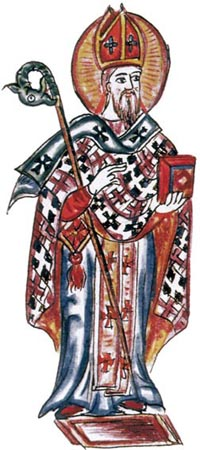
Mkhitar Gosh, miniature, 1713

In the "Lawcode," there are also remarkable provisions regarding the regulation of personal and property relations between spouses. The man is the head of the household, and all family members, including the wife, are subordinate to him. However, male rule is not tyrannical or arbitrary. The rights of both men and women are combined with certain obligations towards the husband and other family members. The husband undertakes to respect his wife, to be humane towards her, to care for her needs, to provide for her material well-being, to care for her when she is ill, to demand marital fidelity, and so on. The husband is subject to legal liability for beating his wife. Mkhitar Gosh conditions the relative equality of women's rights on property relations.

Property owned by spouses prior to marriage is separate, while property acquired during marriage is considered joint ownership. From the moment of marriage, a woman had material and property support, which served as a guarantee of her rights in relation to her husband and within the family. The "Lawcode" is extremely important in terms of conveying information about the inner life of the Armenian people.

One of the most important provisions of the Lawcode is the right to natural equality of people, based on the Bible. Mkhitar Gosh explains the fact of inequality among people by socio-economic relations. Contrary to the ideology of his era, Gosh justifies social inequality with economic reasons.

Gosh notes that the villagers fell into poverty because they lost their main source of income — the land. In order to regulate land relations, he limits the power of usurpers. Explaining the cause of inequality and raising the question of the need to address it was a novelty for the entire legal system of the Middle Ages. Centuries after Gosh, only in the Renaissance era, renowned scholars began to talk about the necessity of equality among people.

== Usage ==
In this sense, Mkhitar Gosh is one of the representatives of medieval humanism. "The Lawcode" rejects religious intolerance, protects the dignity of Muslims, and does not provide for punishments based on religious affiliation. "The Lawcode" was used even beyond Armenia, in those colonies where the Armenian community was granted the right to internal autonomy. Even today, in Sudan, the state court uses "The Lawcode" when considering civil cases of members of the Armenian community.

=== Enforcement of the Lawcode ===
The prevailing opinion in Armenian studies regarding the use of Mkhitar Gosh's Datastanagirk in medieval Armenia is negative. At its core lies a fact that seems quite weighty from the outside. The Lawcode originated not from an authorized body but was the result of an individual's initiative, leading to the assumption that it had obligatory force emanating from such a source. Concurrently, Gosh's Datastanagirk found its application in the legal life of various countries.

During the time of Mkhitar Gosh, numerous similar legislative acts were known to have been introduced. In the second half of the 12th century, a collection of laws based on Roman laws became enforceable in southern France. In 1250, the Accursius Digest, compiled by the last representative of the school of Glossators, was introduced into courts. Many similar works emerged in medieval Europe.

Numerous records from the second half of the 12th century attest to the acute need for a code of laws in medieval Armenia. Both the clergy and the authorities felt this necessity. In the Armenian Kingdom of Cilicia in the West, Nerses Lambronatsi initiated a collection of laws, while here in the East, Mkhitar Gosh initiated this work. However, what Nerses Lambronatsi created mainly included church and, to some extent, household rules, whereas Mkhitar Gosh's Datastanagirk represents one of the monuments of legal thought of that time. It is worth noting that both in the Armenian Kingdom of Cilicia and in the Bagratid Kingdom, justice and state power were exercised by customary authority, but after Mkhitar Gosh, Armenian authorities could use the Lawcode created by him. The Datastanagirk was introduced during the reign of the Zakarians.

In 1254, Sempad the Constable presented Mkhitar Gosh's Lawcode with some modifications, which was adopted in the Armenian Kingdom of Cilicia. Mkhitar Gosh's Datastanagirk was used under different names in other countries as well as in Armenian colonies of Diaspora.

== Translations and publications ==
The "Lawcode" was first published in Armenian by Vahan Bastamyants in 1880. It has several editions in other languages. It was first translated into Latin (abbreviated, modified depending on the place and conditions), which the Armenian colony of Poland presented to Sigismund I for approval in 1519 to regulate according to their national laws. The Latin edition was published by Bishof (1862). From 1519 to 1523, the Latin edition was translated into Polish (published by K. Wucicki in 1843, A. Baronch in 1869, and in the third volume of the Krakow Polish Legal Collection, 1906), which was also translated into Gheg Albanian (in Armenian letters) simultaneously. The "Lawcode" itself was also partially translated into Gheg Albanian. The Book of Judgments was translated into Georgian, forming a section of the "Armenian Law" of the Vakhtang laws, the Georgian edition of which was published by L. Melikset-Beg in 1928 and by I. Rodilsa in 1963. The Russian translation was first published in 1828.

== See also ==
- Mkhitar Gosh
- Goshavank

== Sources ==
Armenian

- Մխիթար Գոշ, Գիրք Դատաստանի (գրաբար)
- Մխիթար Գոշ, Գիրք Դատաստանի (աշխատասիր․ Խ․ Թորոսյանի), Երևան, 1975։
- Խաչիկ Սամուելյան, Մխիթար Գոշի Դատաստանագիրքը և հին հայոց քաղաքացիական իրավունքը, Վիեննա, 1911
- Ալեքսեյ Սուքիասյան, «Մխիթար Գոշը և Հայոց դատաստանագիրքը», Երևան, 1965
- Խոսրով Թորոսյան, Դատարանային համակարգը միջնադարյան Հայաստանում ըստ Մխիթար Գոշի Դատաստանագրքի / ԳԱ «Տեղեկագիր», No.125 1965
- Խոսրով Թորոսյան, «Մխիթար Գոշի Դատաստանագրքի գործադրության մասին միջնադարյան Հայաստանում», / «Պատմաբանասիրական հանդես», No.3, 1971
- Վահան Բաստամյանց, «Մխիթար Գոշի Դատաստանագիր. - Հառաջաբանություն հրատարակողի», Վաղարշապատ, 1880

Russian

- Семейное право по Мхитару Гошу, «Юридическое обозрение», Тифлис, 1885
- Хосров Торосян, «Судоустройство и судопроизводство в средневековой Армении по Судебнику Мхитара Гоша». Автореферат-диссертация на соискание учёной степени кандидата юридический наук, 1969
- С. Арцруни, Историко-догматическое значение Судебника Мхитара Гоша, Тифлис, 1980
- Армянский судебник Мхитара Гоша (пер․ Паповяна А․ А․ с древнеармянского, ред․, вступительная статья и примечания Арутюн я- на Б․ М․), Е․, 1954

English

- Cowe S. P. Medieval Armenian Literary and Cultural Trends (Twelfth-Seventeenth Centuries) // The Armenian People From Ancient to Modern Times: The Dynastic Periods: From Antiquity to the Fourteenth Century / Edited by Richard G. Hovannisian. — St. Martin's Press, 1997. — Vol. I. — P. 293–327.
- Thomson R. W. The Lawcode (Datastanagirk') of Mxit'ar Goš. — Rodopi, 2000.
- Thomson R. W. The Crusaders through Armenian Eyes // The Crusades from the Perspective of Byzantium and the Muslim World / Edited by Angeliki E. Laiou and Roy Parviz Mottahedeh. — Dumbarton Oaks, 2001. — P. 71–83.
