= Goshavank =

Monastery in Tavush Province, Armenia

Goshavank Գոշավանք
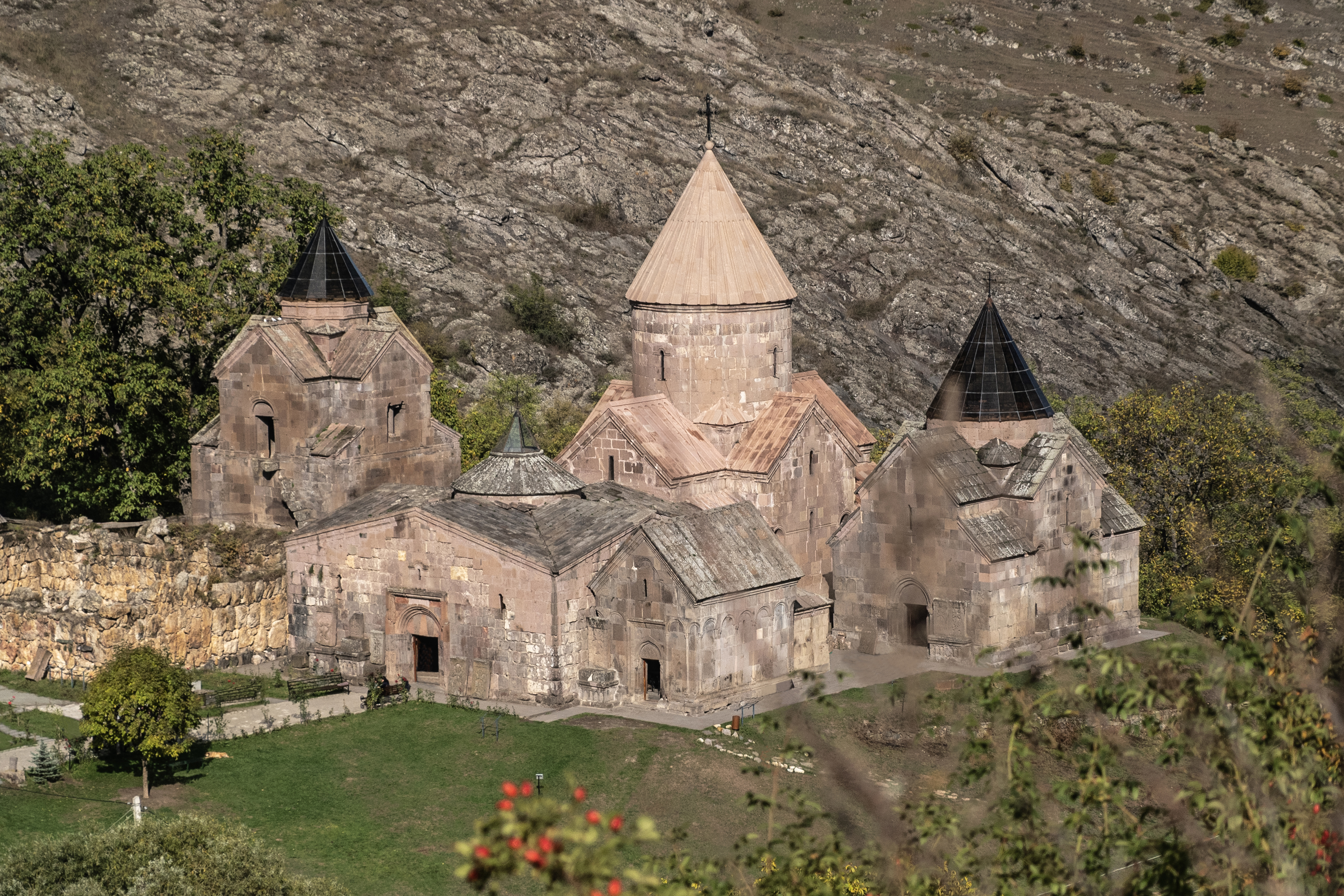
- The monastic complex of Goshavank.

- Location within Armenia Location within Tavush

Religion
- Affiliation: Armenian Apostolic Church

Location
- Location: Gosh, Tavush Province, Armenia
- Coordinates: 40.729878°N 44.997725°E

Architecture
- Style: Armenian
- Completed: 12th or 13th century

Goshavank (Armenian: Գոշավանք; meaning "Monastery of Gosh"; previously known as Nor Getik) is a 12–13th-century Armenian monastery located in the village of Gosh in the Tavush Province of Armenia. The monastery which has remained in relatively good condition also houses one of the world's finest examples of a khachkar.

== History ==
Goshavank was erected in the place of an older monastery once known as Nor Getik, which had been destroyed by an earthquake in 1188. Mkhitar Gosh, a statesman, scientist and author of numerous fables and parables as well as the first criminal code, took part in the rebuilding of the monastery.

At Goshavank, Mkhitar Gosh founded a school. One of its alumni, an Armenian scientist by the name of Kirakos Gandzaketsi wrote The History of Armenia. The architect Mkhitar the Carpenter and his disciple Hovhannes also took an active part in the building of the monastery. The complex was later renamed Goshavank and the village named Gosh in his honor.

== Complex ==
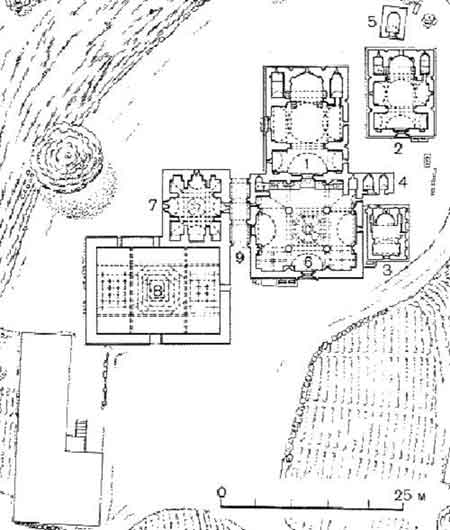
Complex Floorplan: 1. St. Astvatsatsin Church (1191–1196); 2. St. Gregory Church (1208–1241); 3. St. Gregory the Illuminator Church (1237–1241); 4. Double chapel (13th century); 5. Single chapel; 6. Gavit of St. Astvatsatsin church (1197–1203); 7. Bell tower and book depository (1241–1291); 8. School building (13th century); 9. Gallery (13th century)

Goshavank does not have outer walls, and is surrounded by village homes. All of the buildings are attached to each other except for S. Hripsime Chapel, which is located on the opposite hillside and within view.

Numerous religious and monumental civil buildings show that in the twelfth to thirteenth centuries the monastery was full of life.

The churches are decorated in accordance with the traditions of the time. As a rule, the door portals and windows are framed in rectangular or arched platbands some of which are profiled. The façade niches have multifoil or scalloped tops like those of the niches of the main church at Geghard. The unusual and artistically framed sun dial on the southern façade is an eye-catching decorative element.

=== S. Astvatsatsin ===
The main churches belong to the types widespread in the tenth to the thirteenth centuries; the domed tall or the cross-winged domed building with four annexes in the corners of the central crossing. S. Astvatsatsin church was built during the years 1191–1196.

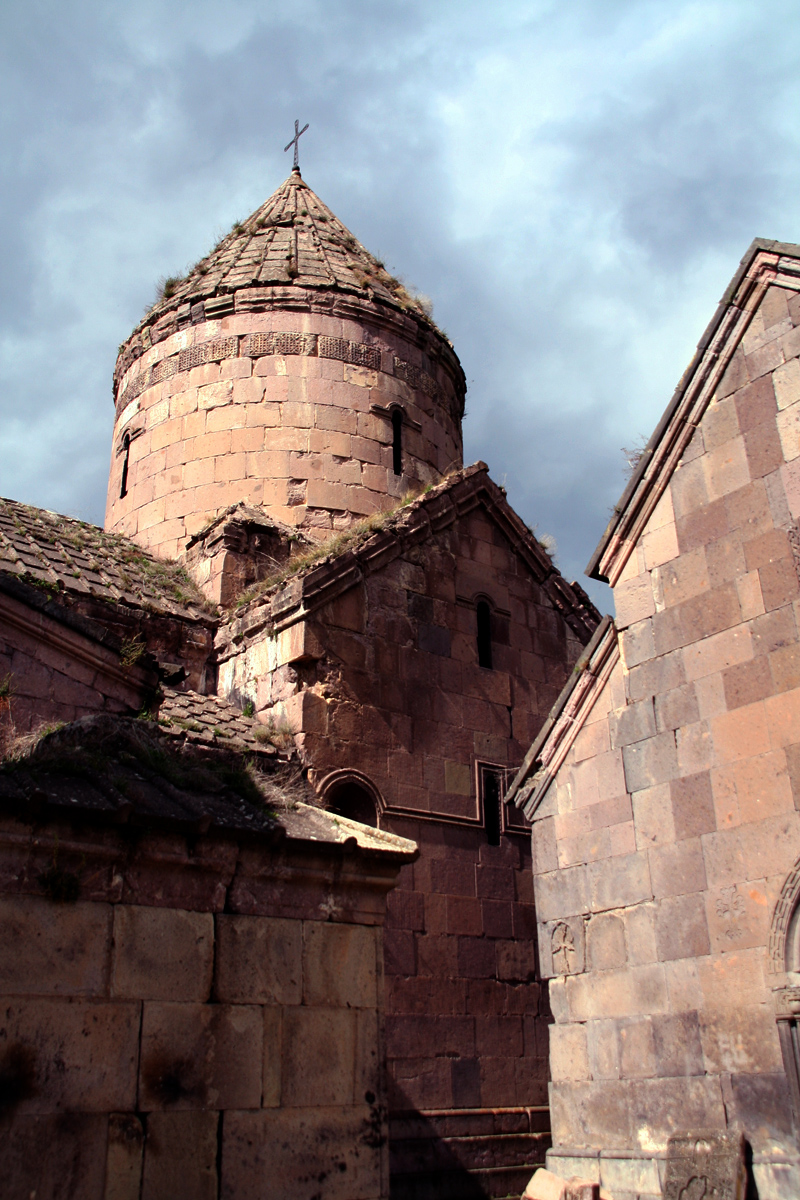
S. Astvatsatsin (1191).

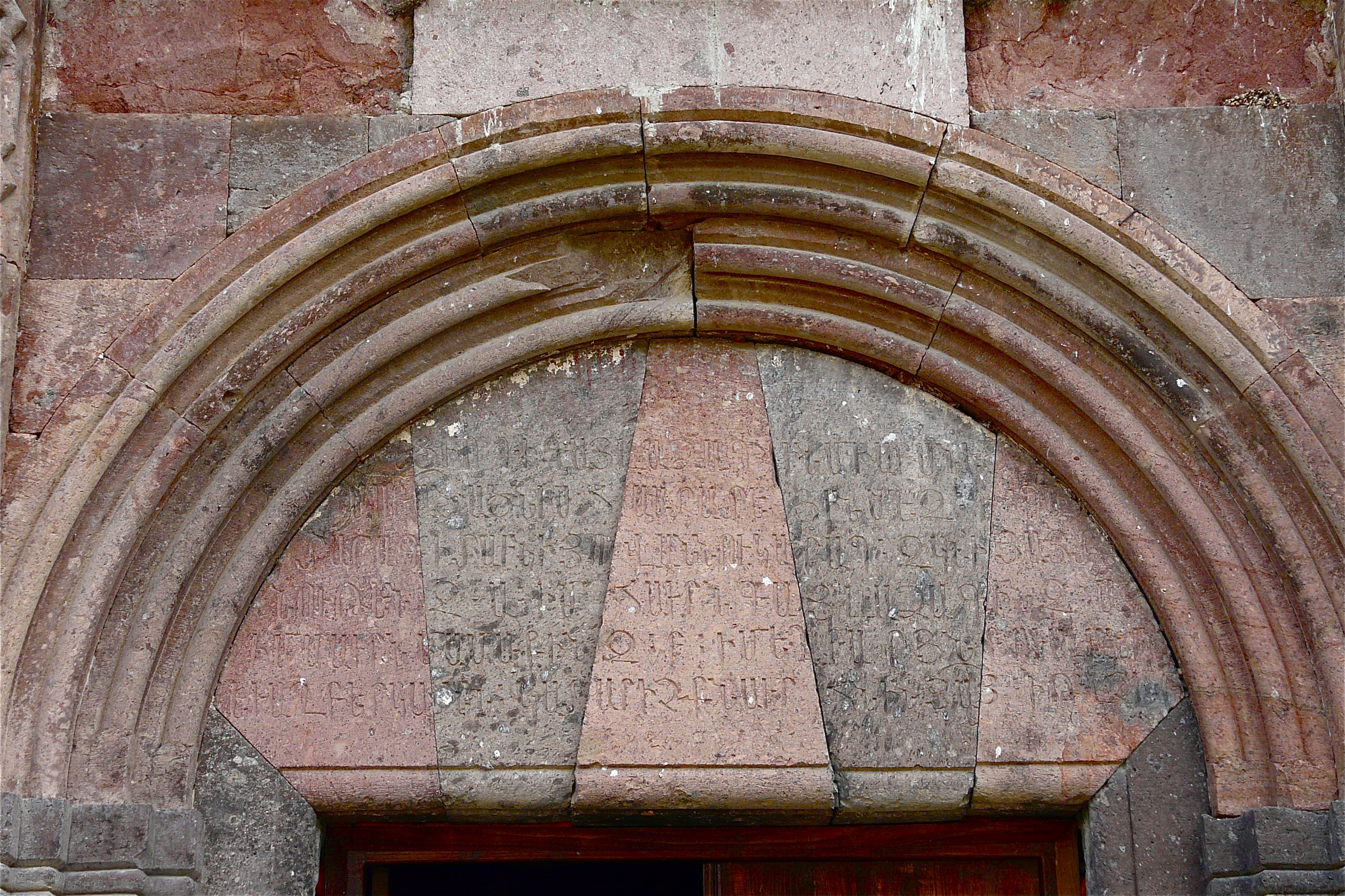
gavit

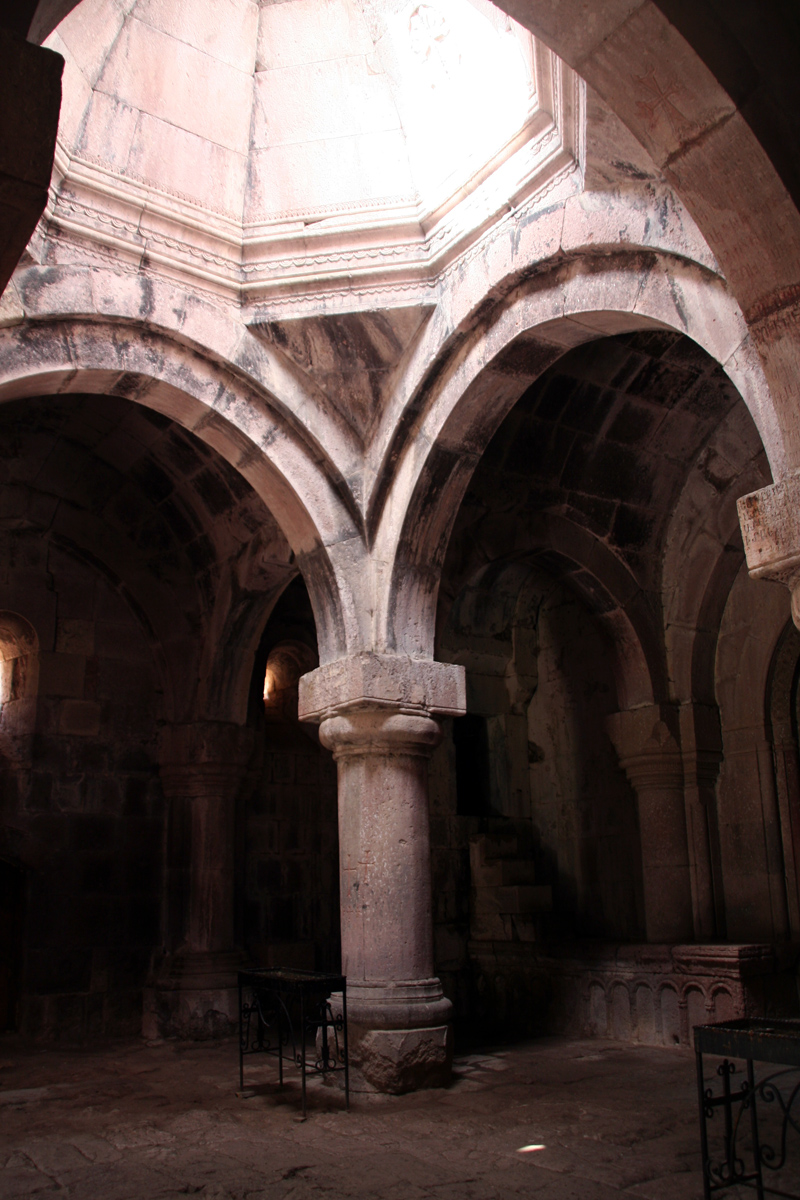
S. Astvatsatsin gavit (1197).

=== St. Gregory Church ===
St. Gregory Church is found between the three chapels.

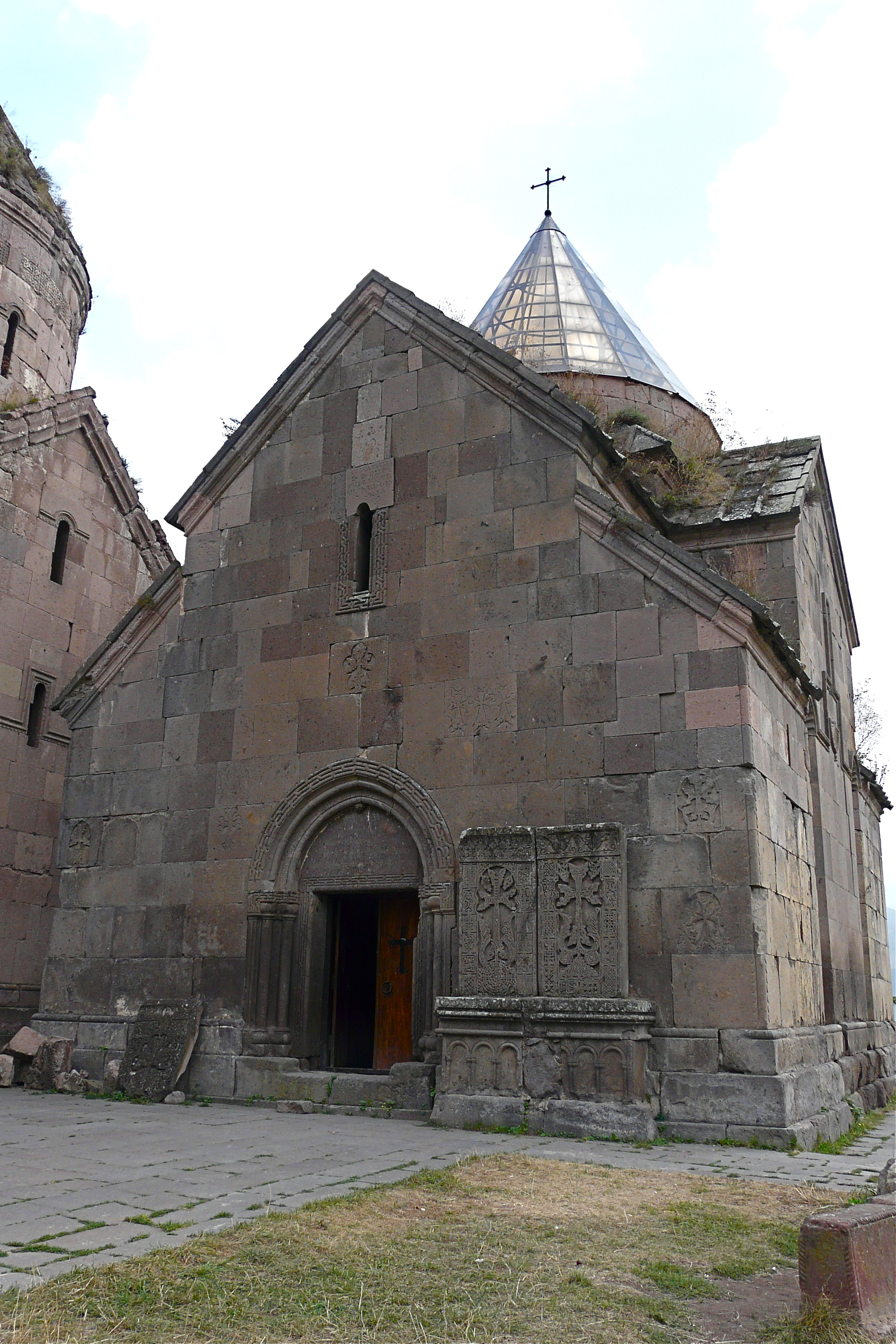

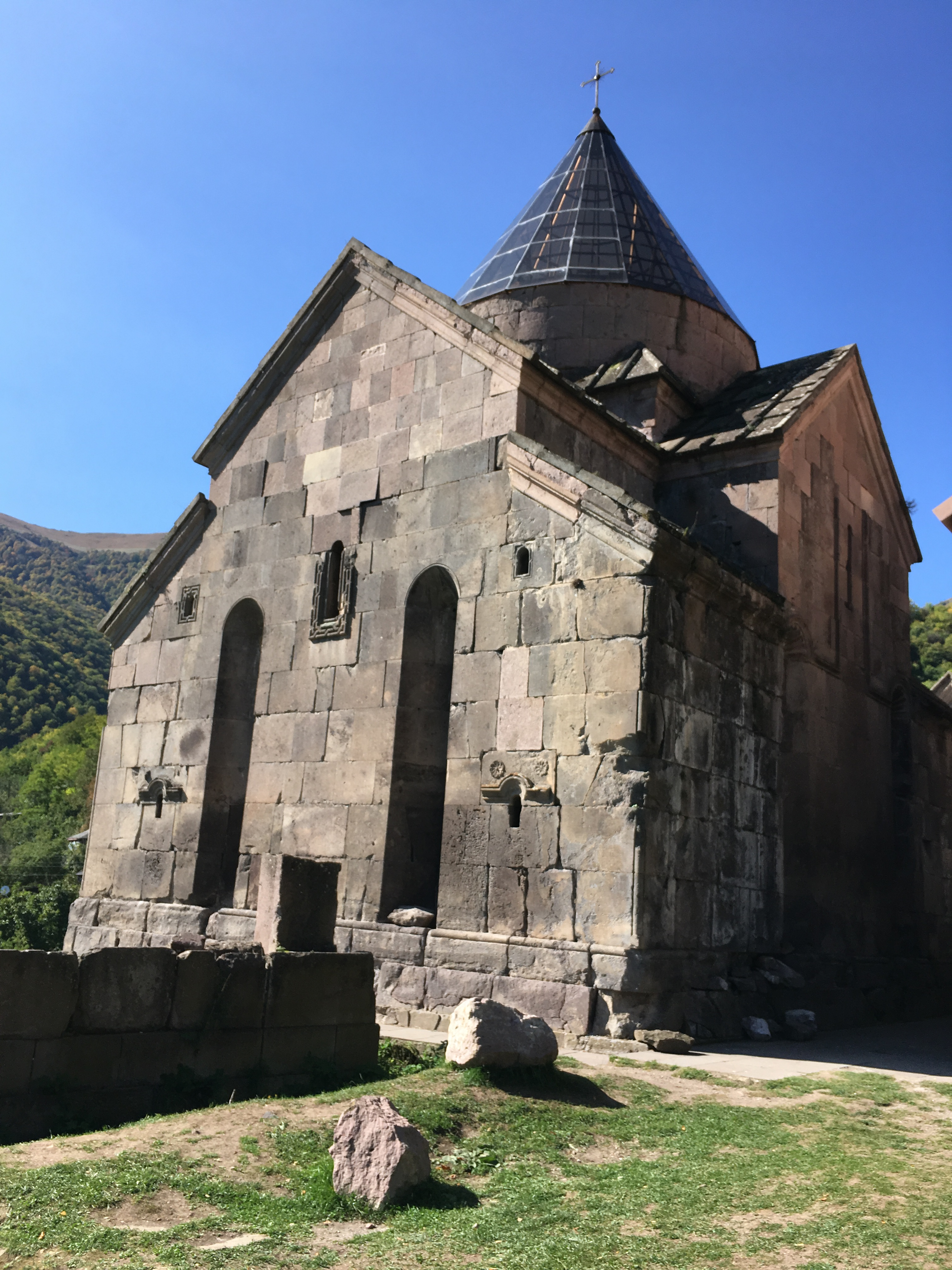

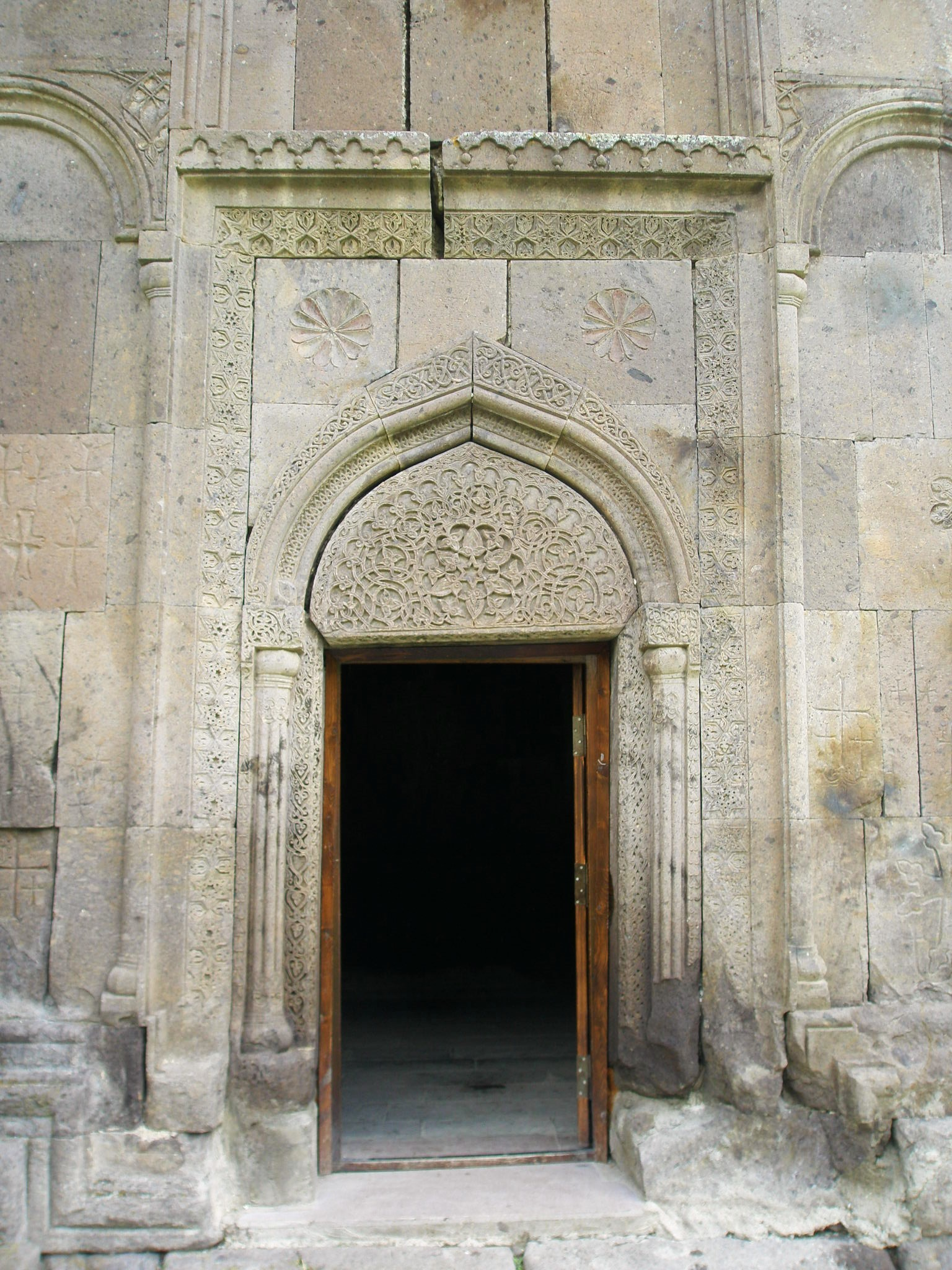
Exterior portal façade of Grigor Lusavorich church.

=== Grigor Lusavorich Church ===
Grigor Lusavorich Church in Goshavank, started in 1237 and finished by Prince Grigor-Tkha in 1241, while being true to the type of Armenia's fifth-century basilicas, is distinguished by the extravagance of its decorations. The small interior has intricate carvings over most of the surface.

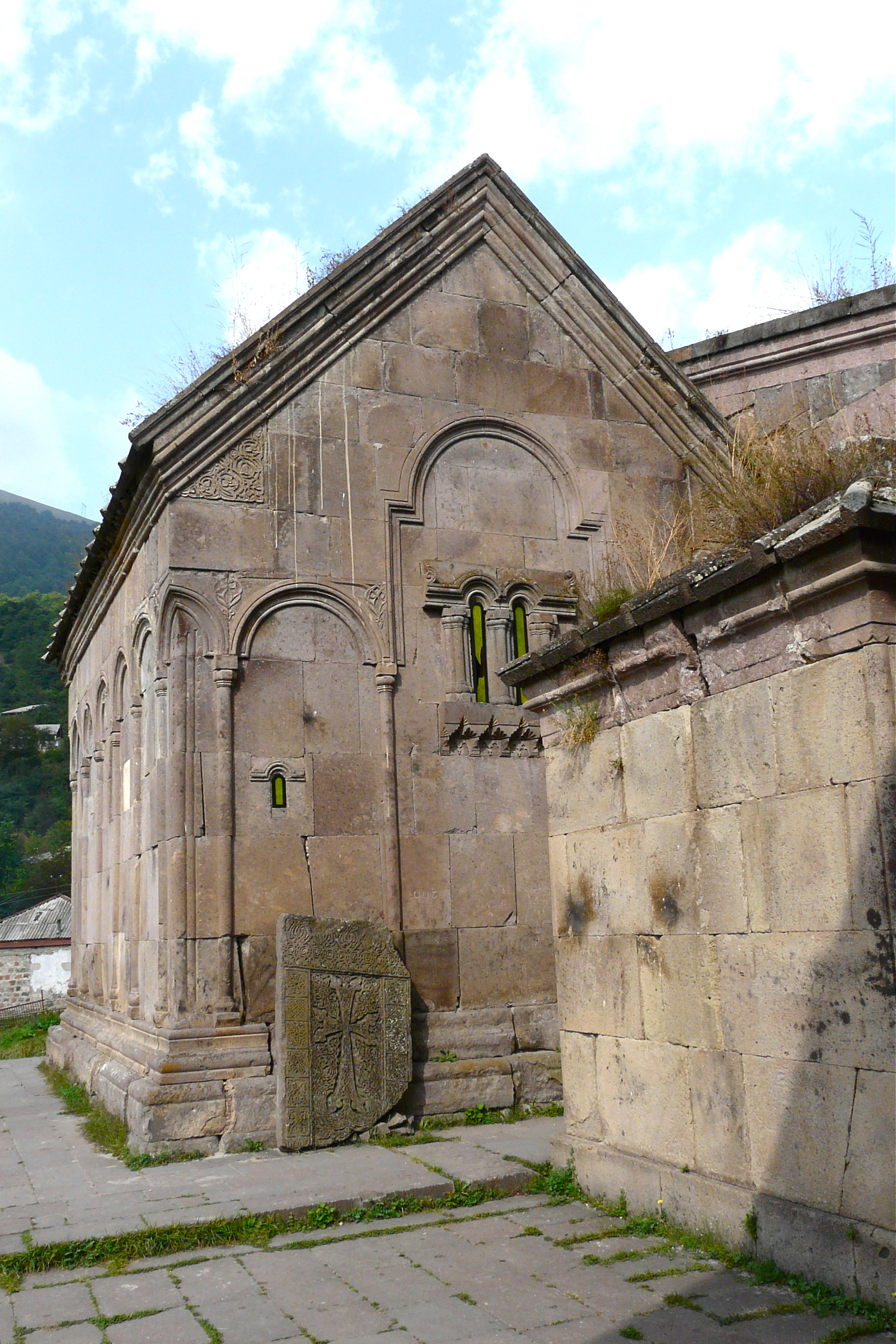
Grigor Lusavorich Church

It is a small vaulted structure. The bottom of the altar apse is trimmed by a graceful arcature topped with a band which is ornamented with an intricate geometrical pattern and garlands of alternating trefoils and spheres. The columns of the interior lining the sides of the apse and supporting the wall arch of the arched floor are covered with twisted flutings and fillets; a floral ornament of an ingenious design fills the middle of the lintels of the doors leading to annexes.

The exterior decoration of the church is also rich. The graceful arcature with ornamented spandrels, engirdling the edifice, is topped with half-arches on the corners. This creates not only an interesting decoration of the facets of the edifice, but also a smoother transition of the arcature from one facade to the other. The decoration of the butt facades, especially of the western one, is divided in height into separate parts to produce an impression of a substantial size.

The framings of the twin window of the eastern facade and of the western entrance are original. The tympanum of the pointed arch of the latter is filled with a fine ornament composed of an intricate interlacement of floral shoots forming a combination of rosettes of various sizes. A similar ornament covers lintel stones, abaci of the columns, individual parts of the archivolt and a hand of eight-pointed stars trimming the portal in a rectangular frame.

The carving is so perfect that the overall impression is that of openwork lace. The distinctiveness and richness of the church's decoration evidence the artistic taste and consummate skill of the craftsmen who created it.

=== Chapels ===
The double chapels are attached to the gavit, and are found behind the church of S. Grigor Luysavorich. There is also a single chapel found behind St. Gregory Church.

=== Gavit of St. Astvatsatsin Church ===
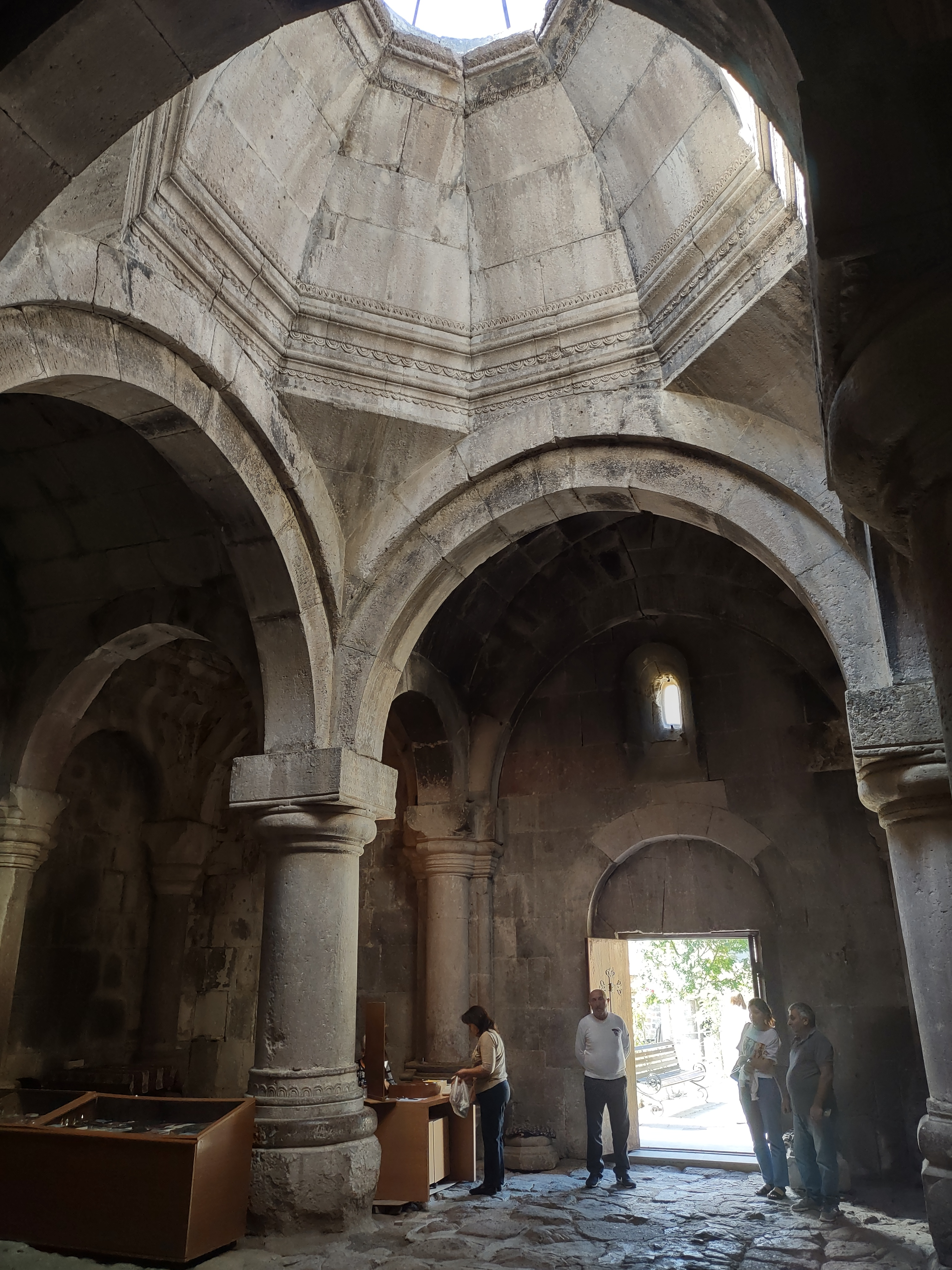
Gavit (1197).

The gavit of S. Astvatsatsin Church belongs to the most common square plan, with roofing supported by four internal abutments. It has a squat octahedral tents above the central section, making it similar in structure to the Armenian peasant home of the glkhatun type. The gavit has small annexes in the corners of the eastern side of the building. Decorated with various rosettes, these sections contain sculptures of human figures in monks' attires, carrying crosses, staffs, and birds.

=== Bell tower and book depository ===
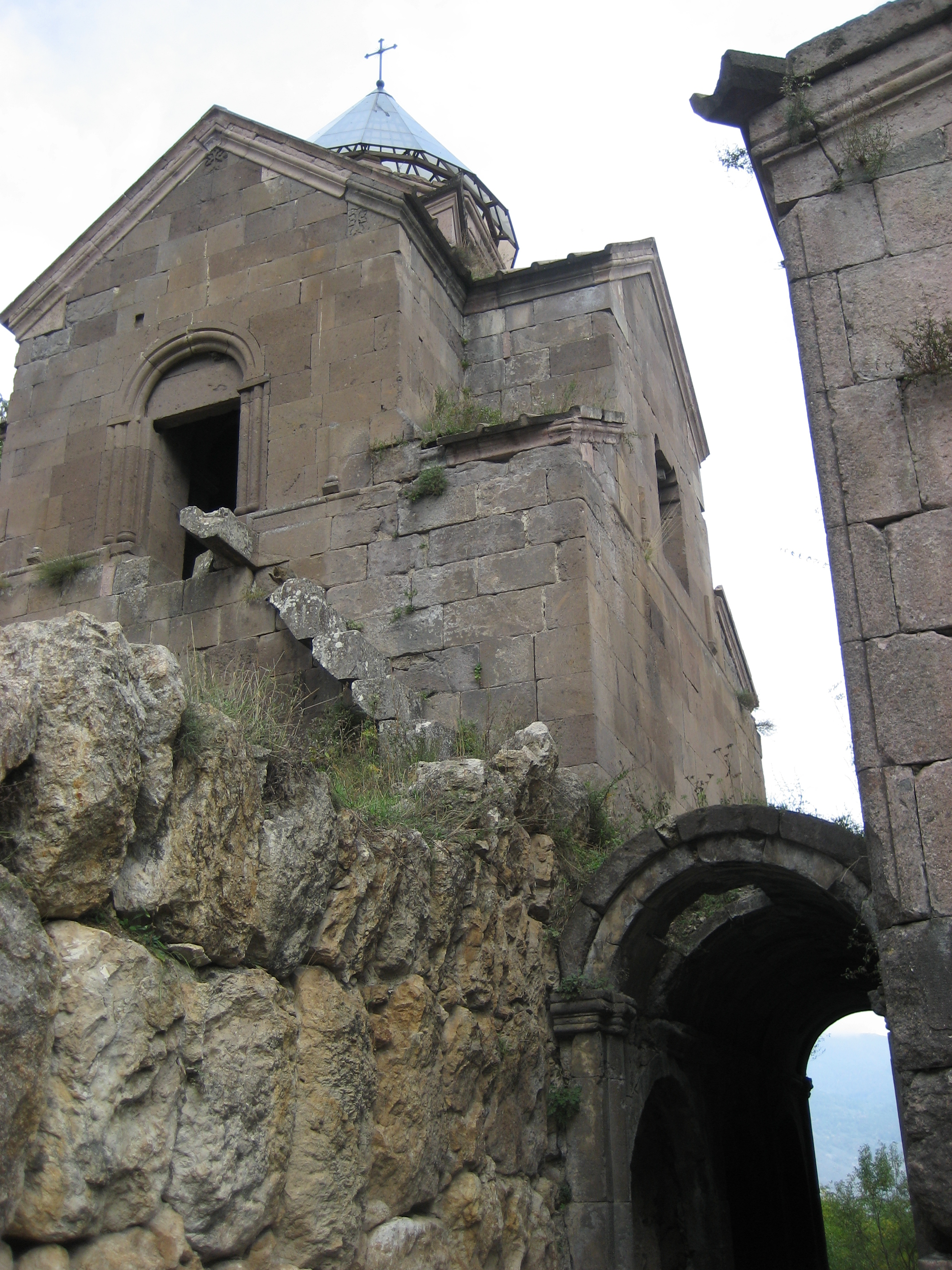
Bell tower and book repository to the left of the gallery

The book depository with a bell tower in Goshavank is a structure of unusual composition. Originally, before 1241. there had been in its place a small building with niches for keeping books with a wooden glkhatun type ceiling. Adjacent to it on the western side was a vast premise which probably served as a refectory and an auditorium. It also had wooden roofing which, judging by its size, had three tents and four internal wooden abutments.

Then, a two-floor bell tower was built over the book depository. The construction was carried out in two stages. Eight wall-attached abutments and a stone roofing consisting of two pairs of intersecting arches were constructed in the book depository for the cross-plan superstructure. The top floor was elevated only to the height of two rows of stone masonry, as evidenced by the incomplete half-columns situated on the facades. In the second stage, accomplished in 1291 by the patrons Dasapet and Karapet, the top – a small church with two altar apses, crowned with a multicolumn rotund belfry – was completed. The entrance to the church was from the roof of the auditorium by a cantilever stone stair.

The decoration of the building was rather modest. The book depository's semi-circular and dihedral grooved abutments were topped with plain slabs with the lower corners sloped in the shape of trefoils. The roofings of the corner sections, designed on the false vault principle, are composed of triangles differing in size and shape and arranged in such a way as to form eight-pointed stars. The decoration and design of the base of the rotund belfry, which reproduces in stone modified details of the “glkhatun” wooden tent, is more imposing. The bell tower was taller than Grigor church, and therefore dominated Goshavank ensemble.

The outer appearance of the building is marked by the gradation of its bulks from the heavy bottom part to the openwork top which emphasizes the domination of the vertical in the building's composition. The architectural peculiarities of the composition of the bell tower influenced the design of the structures like the two-story sepulchral churches in Yeghvard and Noravank built in Armenia in the second quarter of the fourteenth century.

=== School building ===
The school building lies in ruins.

=== Gallery ===
The gallery is a covered area between the gavit and the bell tower, like a passage, and open on both ends (at least today).

=== Khachkars ===
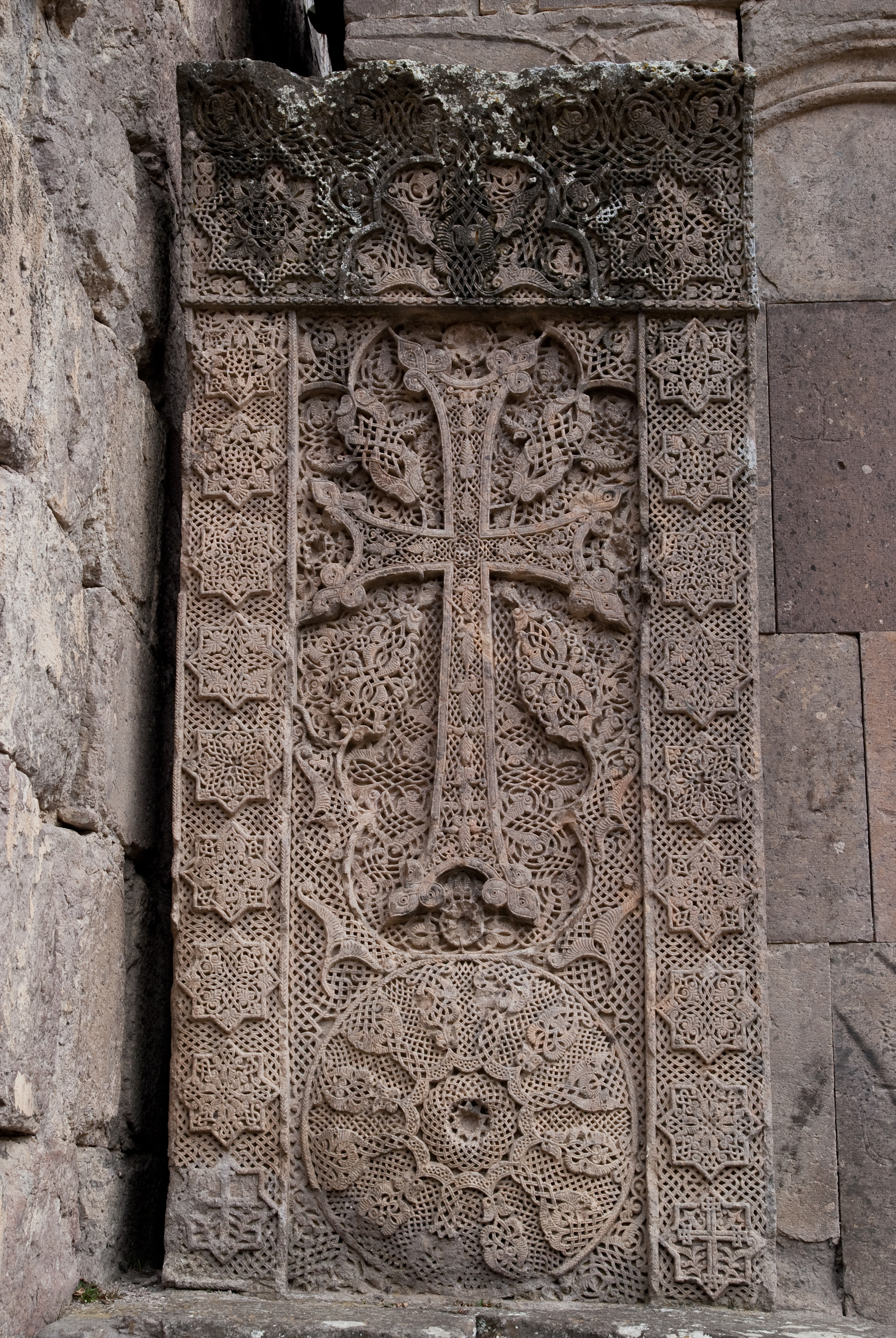
The famous khachkar at Goshavank known as "Aseghnagorts" (The Needlecarved)

The khachkars created by the carver Pavgos in Goshavank stand out among the rest. The best of them is a 1291 khachkar with the maker's name carved in the bottom left star, which is one of the most intricate examples in existence. The finely carved lacy ornaments are arranged in layers in which the basic elements of the composition — a cross on a shield-shaped rosette and eight-pointed Starr filling the corners of the middle-cross section—show clearly. The intricate openwork ornaments vary — a clear-cut geometrical pattern constitutes the background, and the accentuating elements form a complicated combination of a floral and geometrical ornament which never repeats itself.

=== S. Hripsime Chapel ===
St. Hripsime chapel (1254), situated south-west of the main group on an opposite hillside consists of a square, domed building.

== UNESCO ==
The monastery of Goshavank, together with that of Haghartsin, may become part of a natural site based on the state protected area of Dilijan National Park, an important forest in north-eastern Armenia.

== Gallery ==
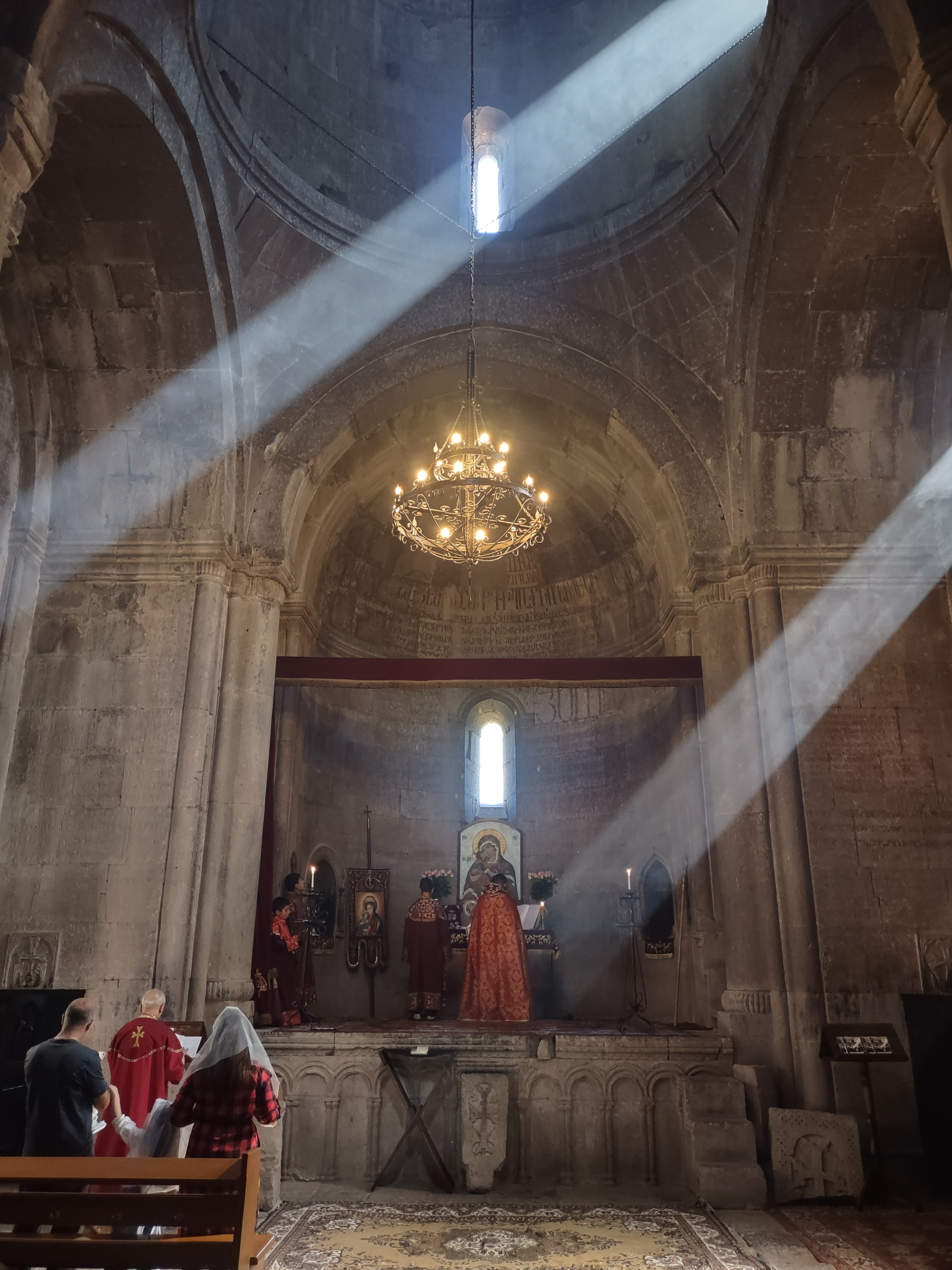
Altar of S. Astvatsatsin Church

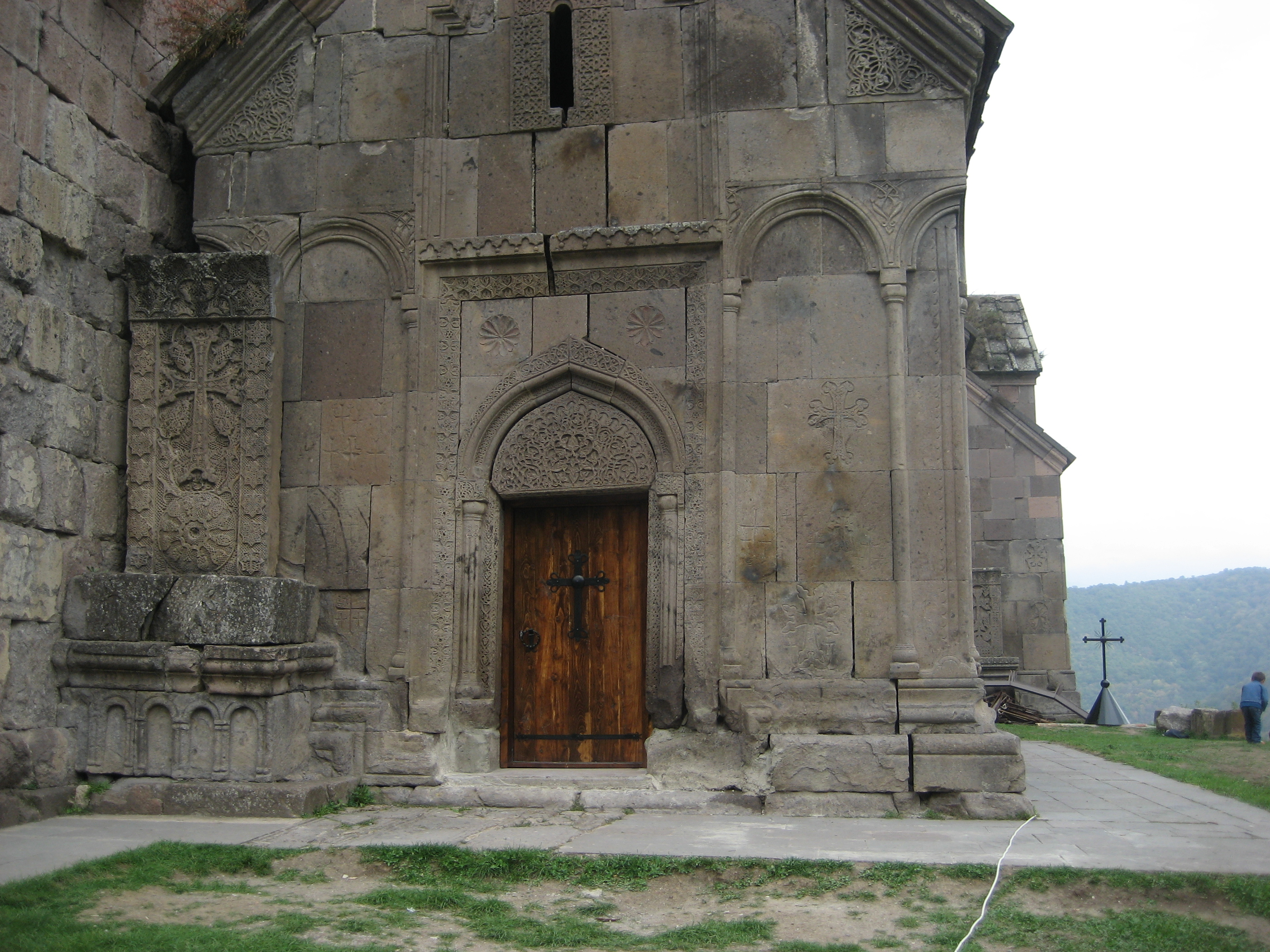
Grigor Luysavorich Church's intricate facade

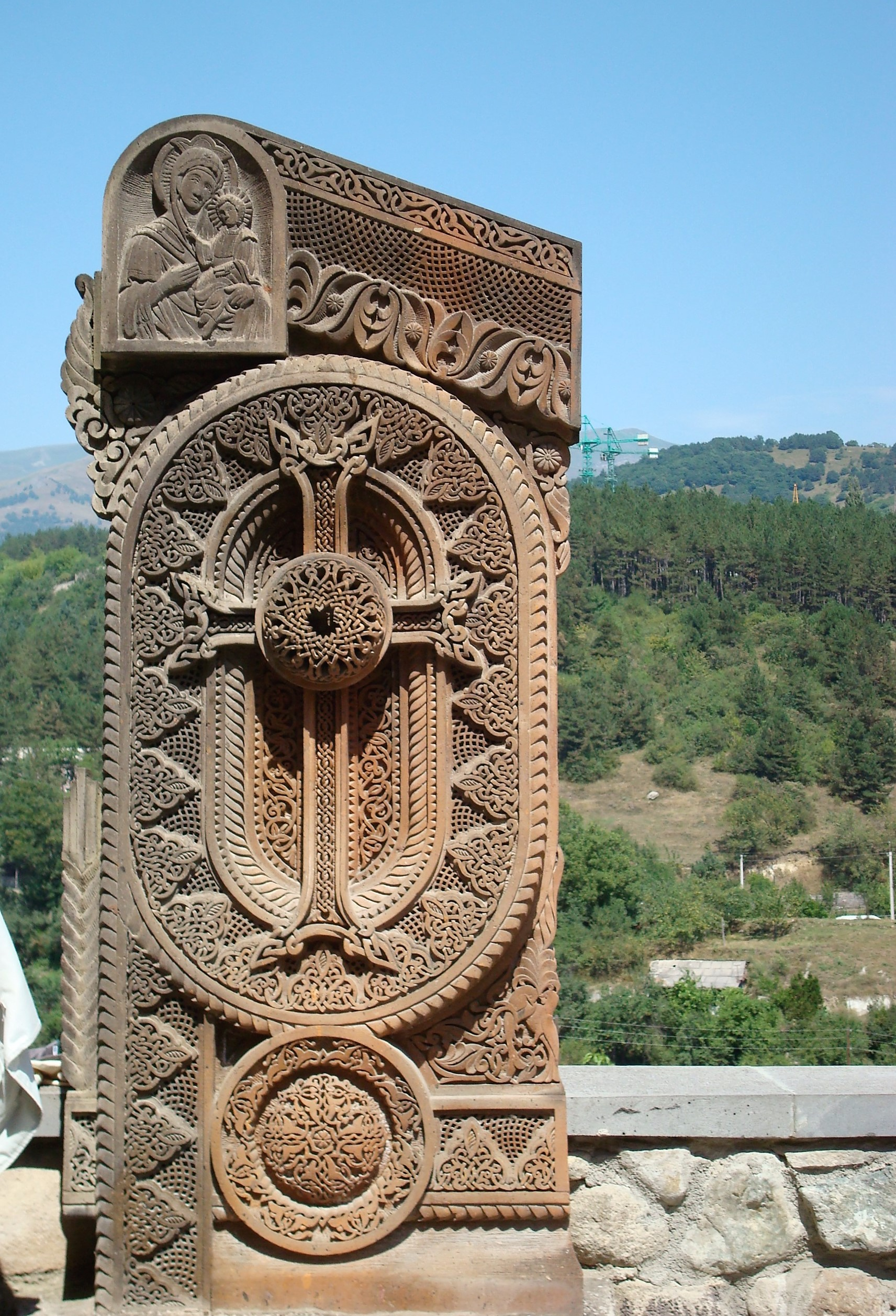
Modern Khatchkar at Dilijan

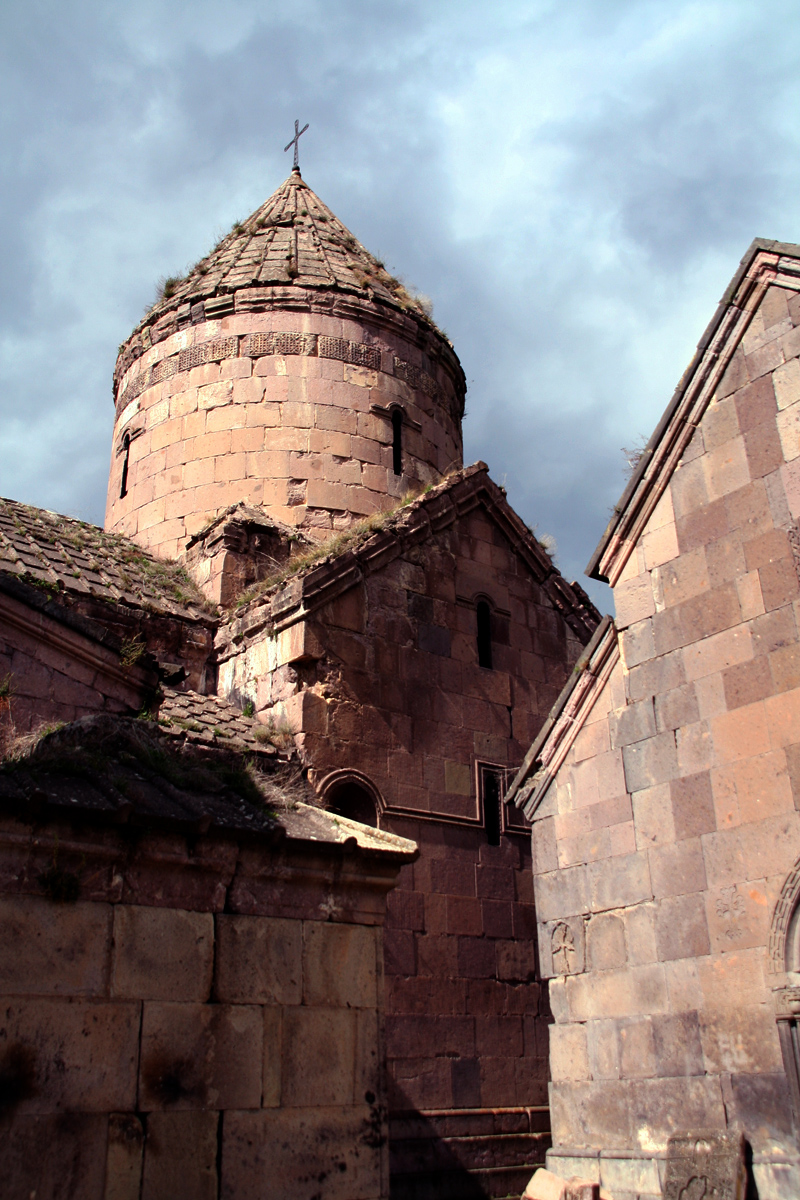
Saint Astvatsatsin Church

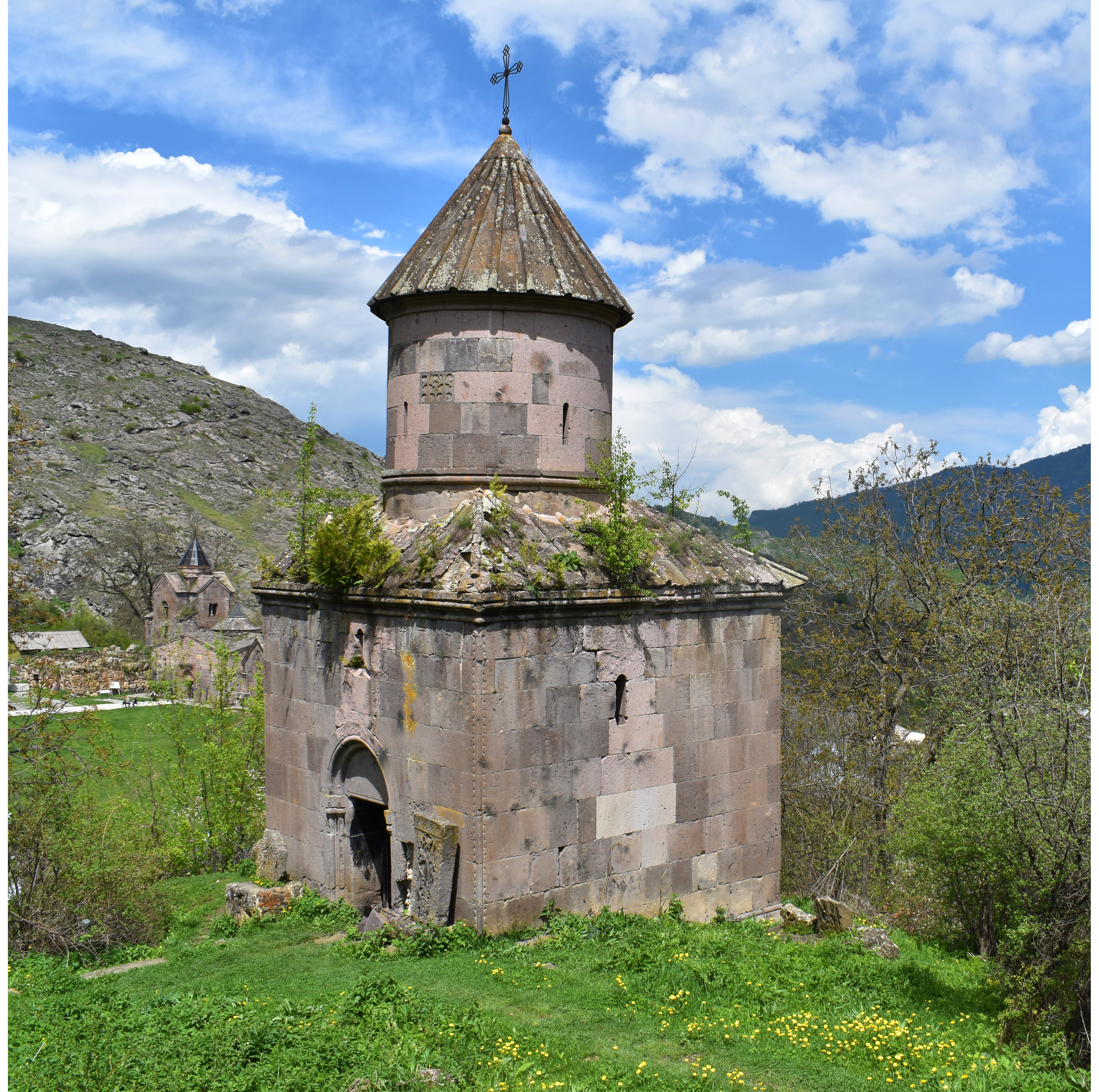
Saint Gevorg church

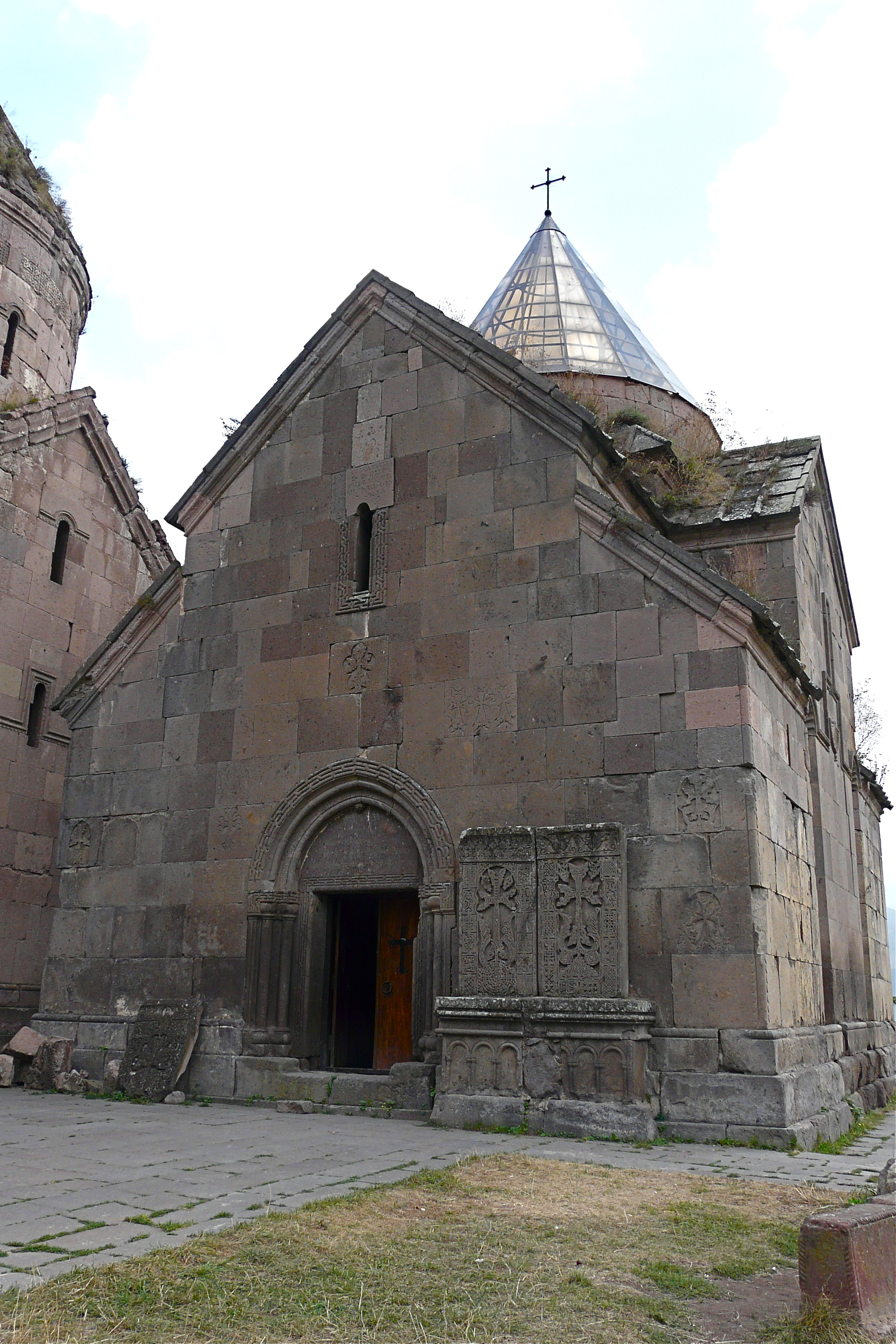

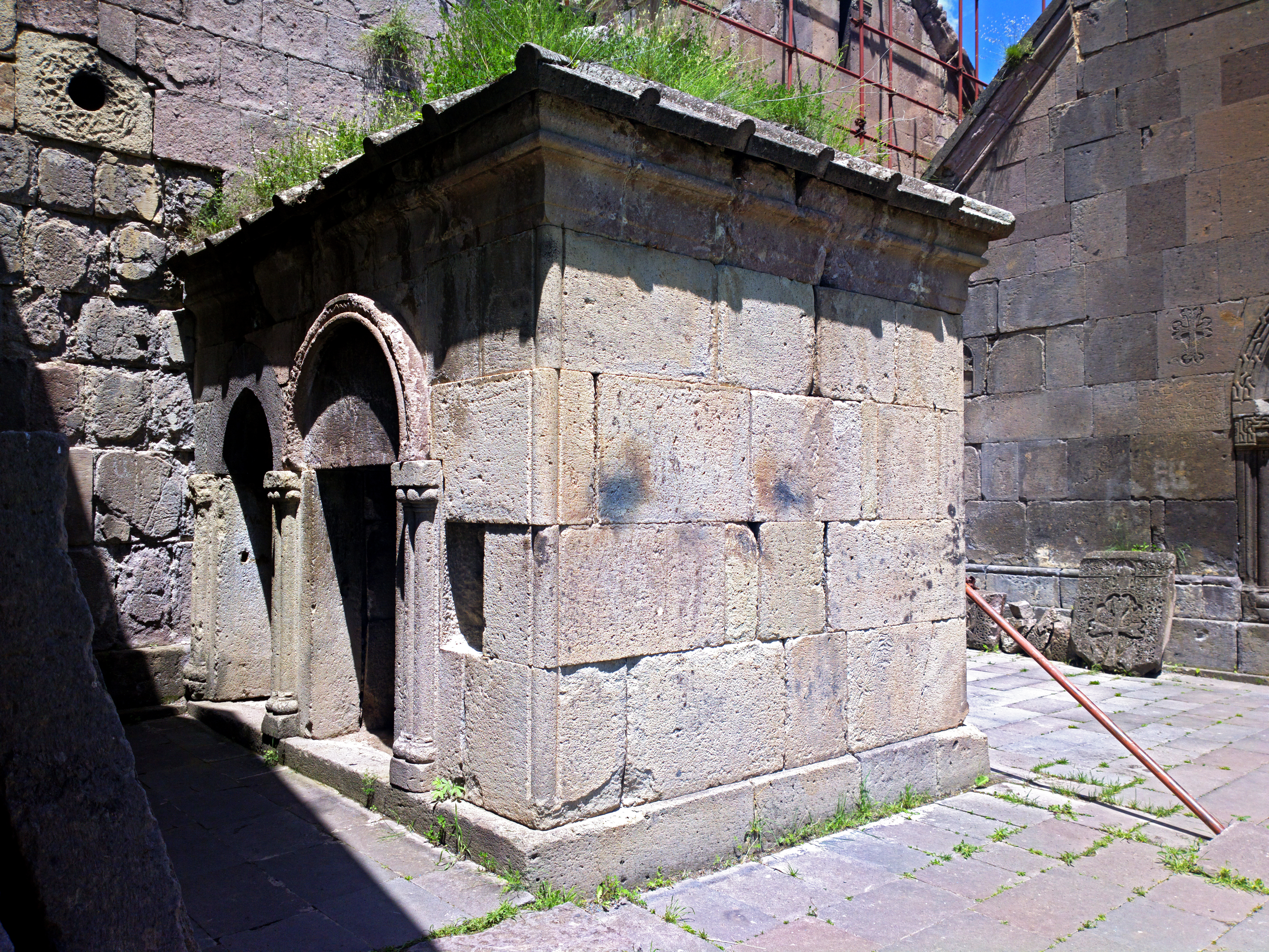

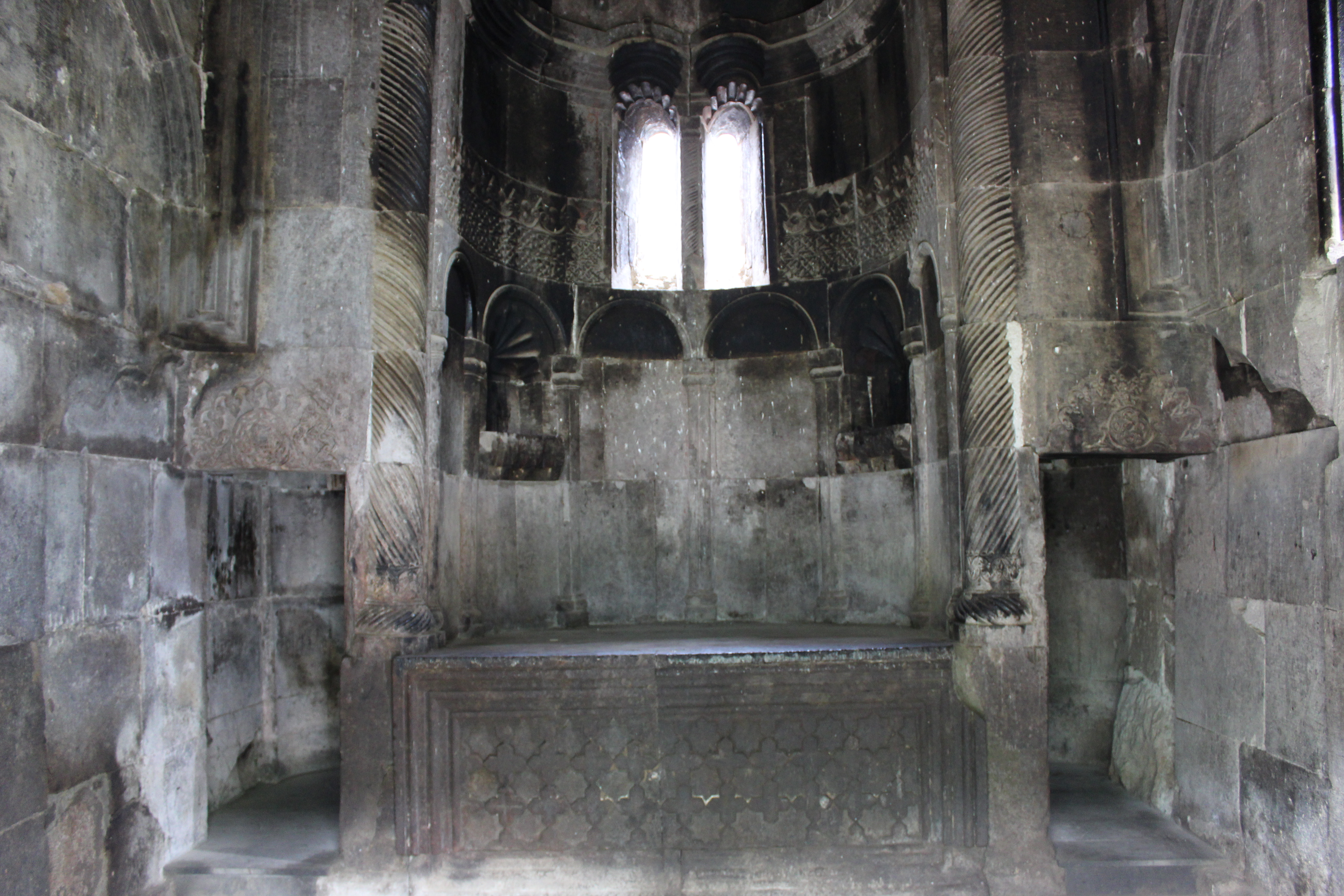

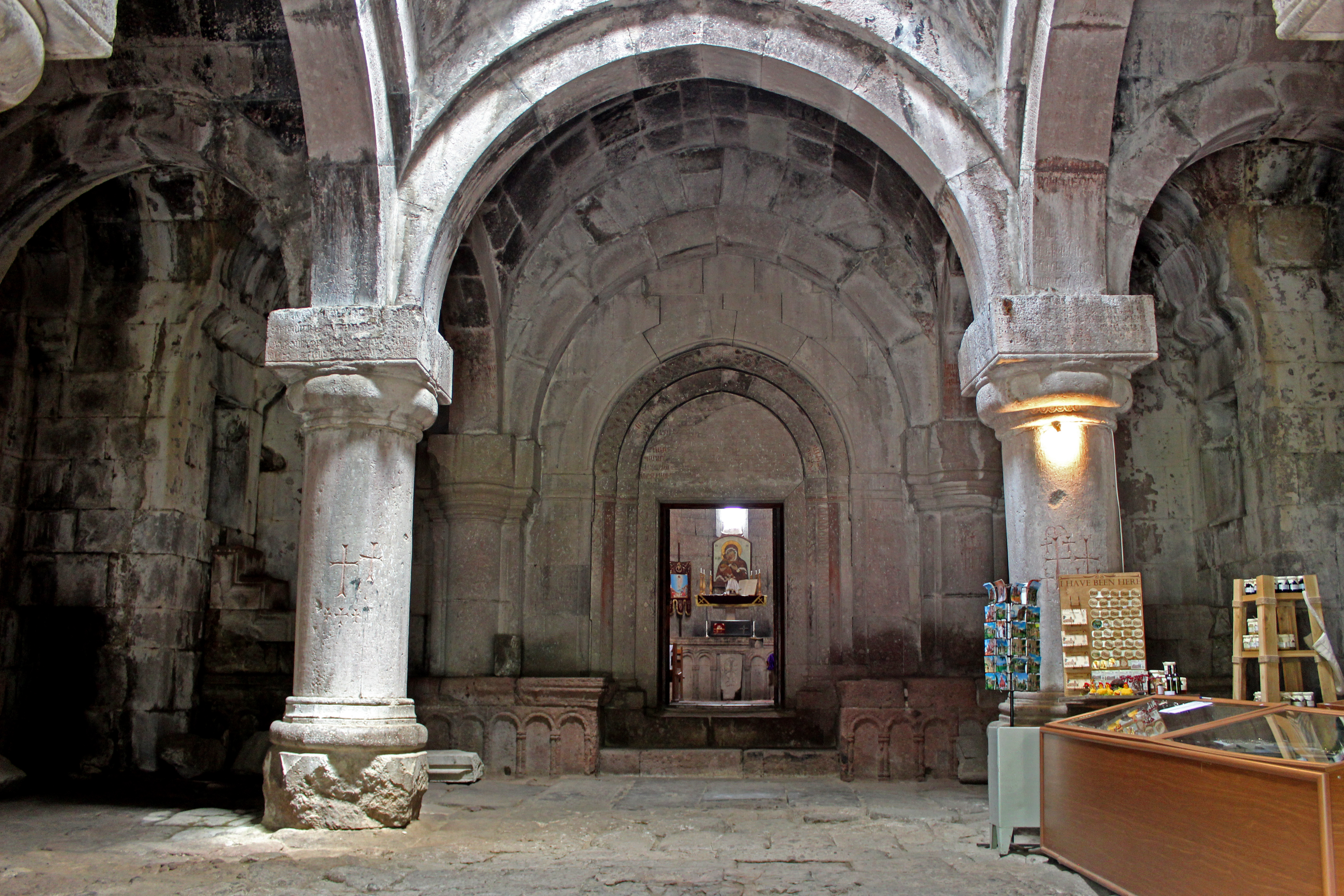
Gavit of Goshavank inside

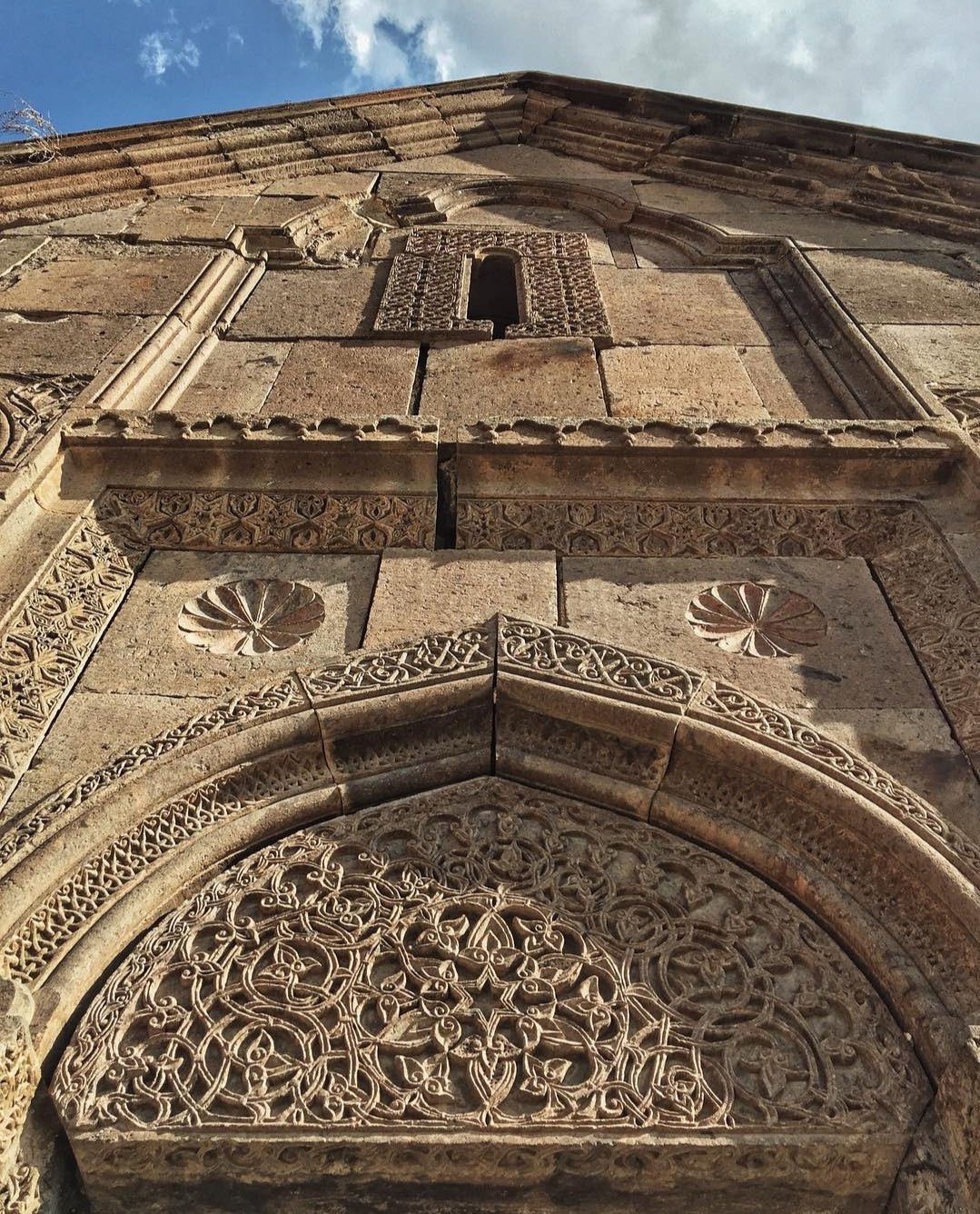
Deities of facade of church

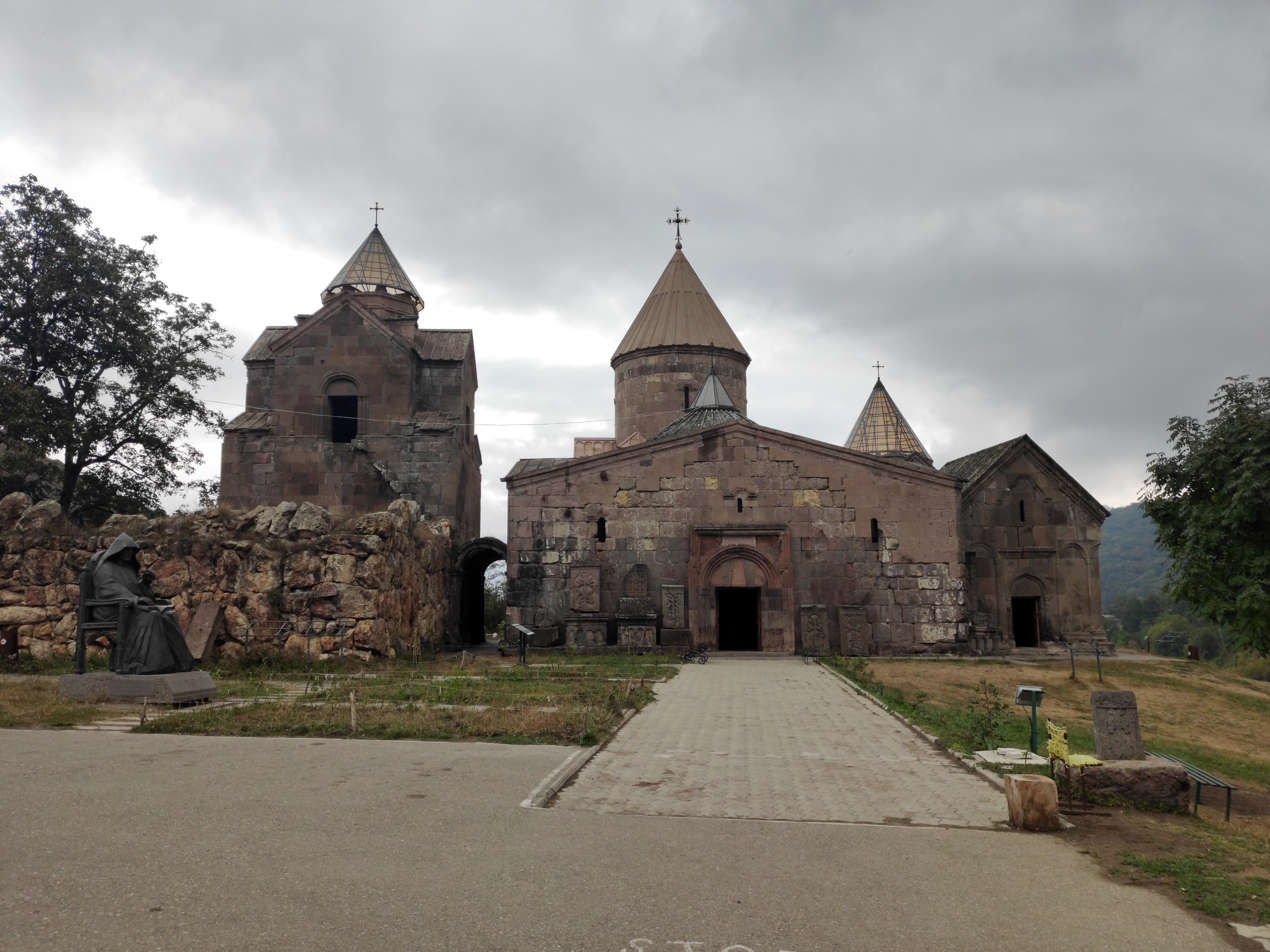

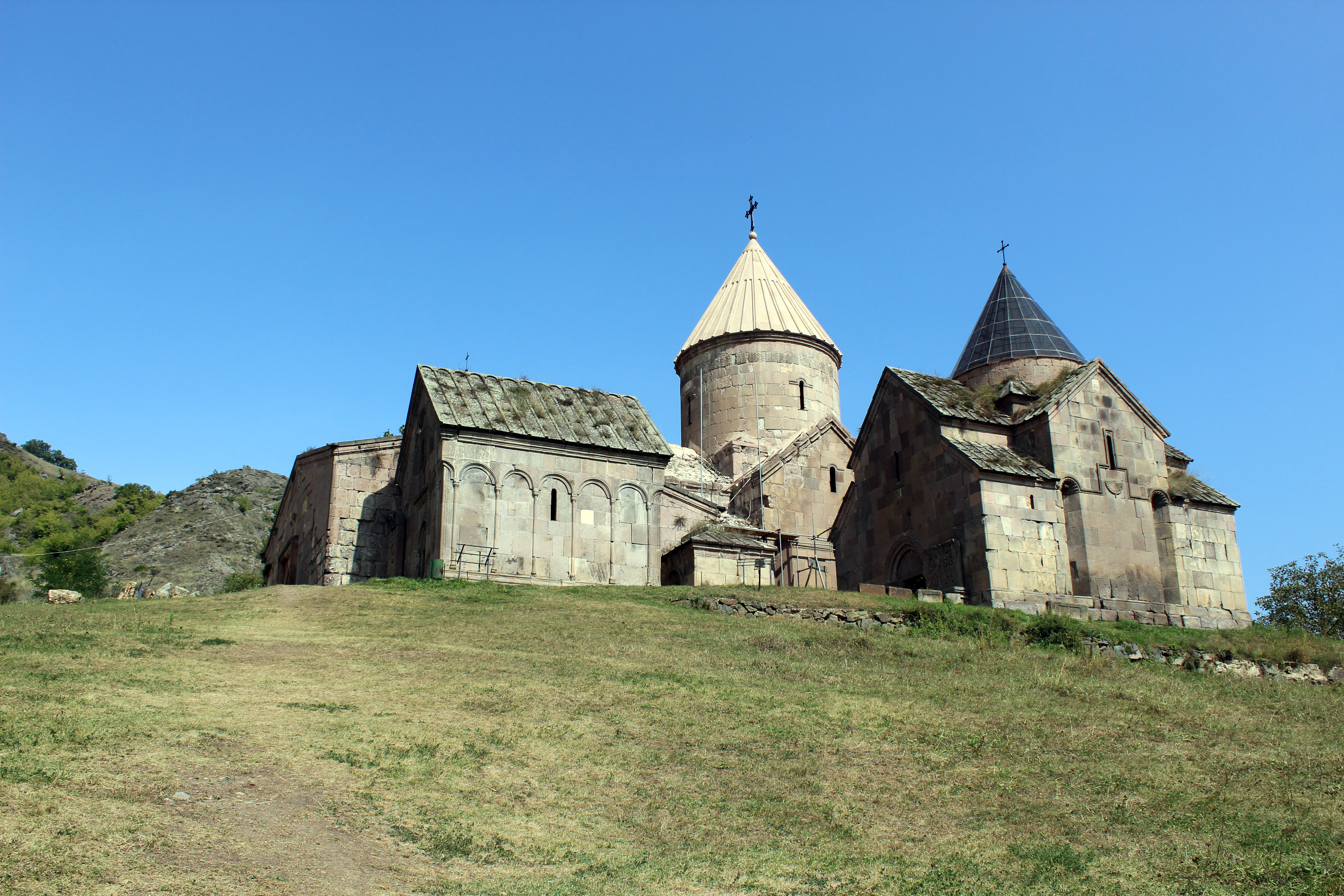

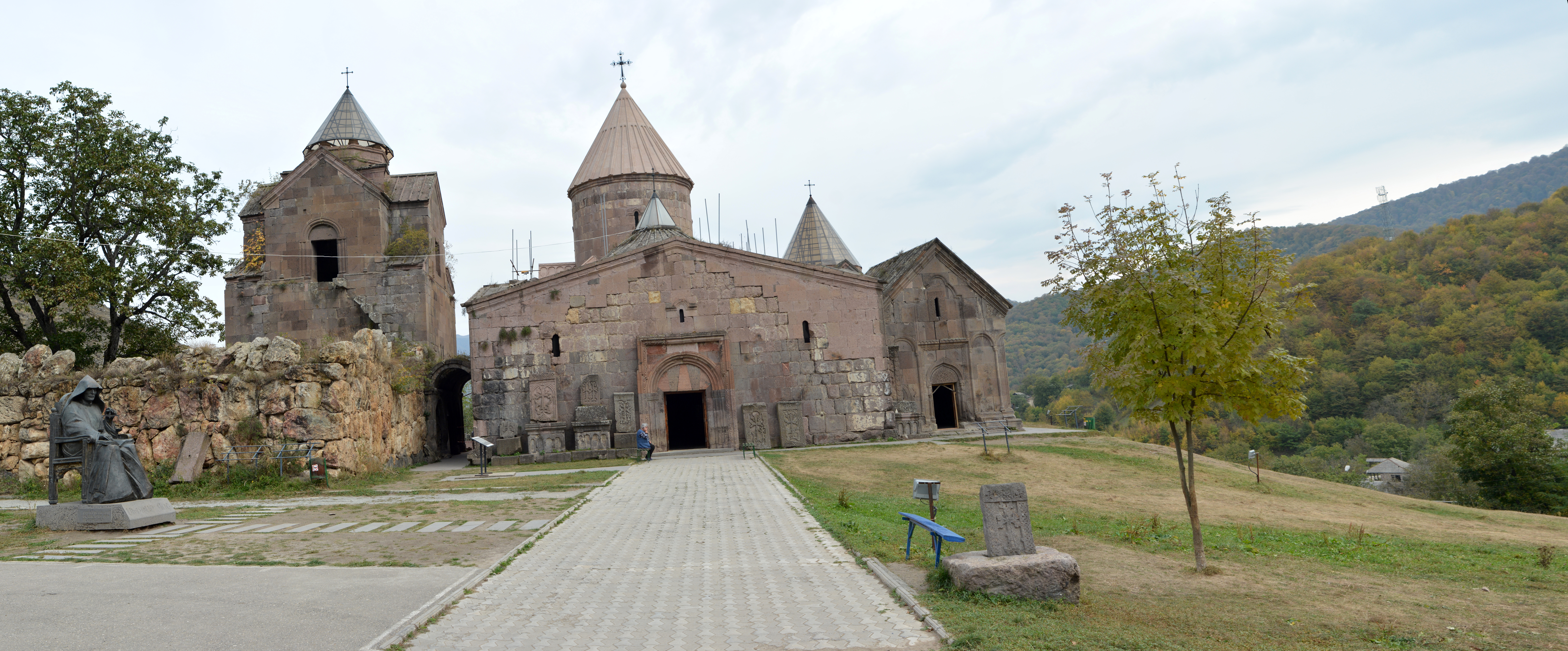

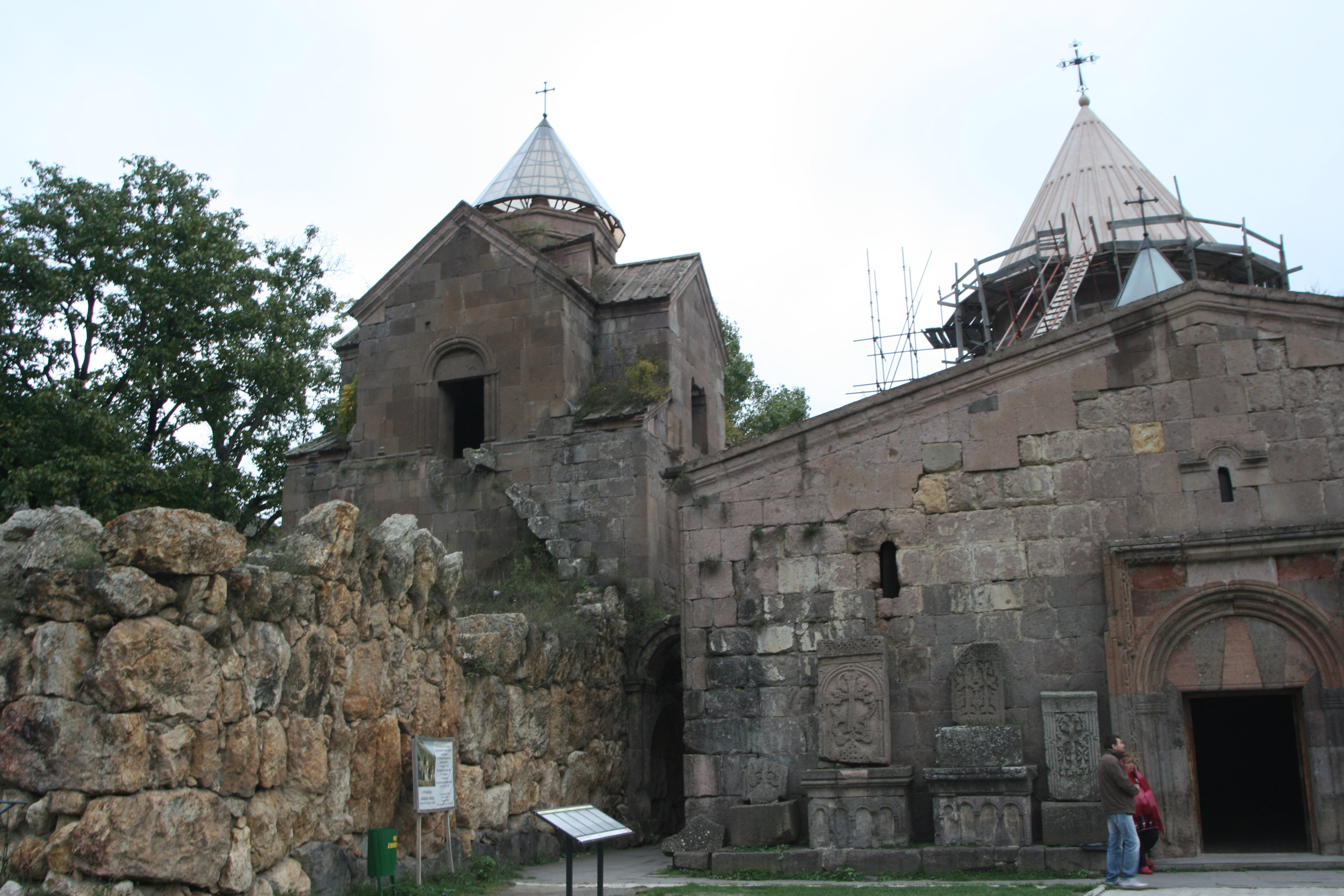

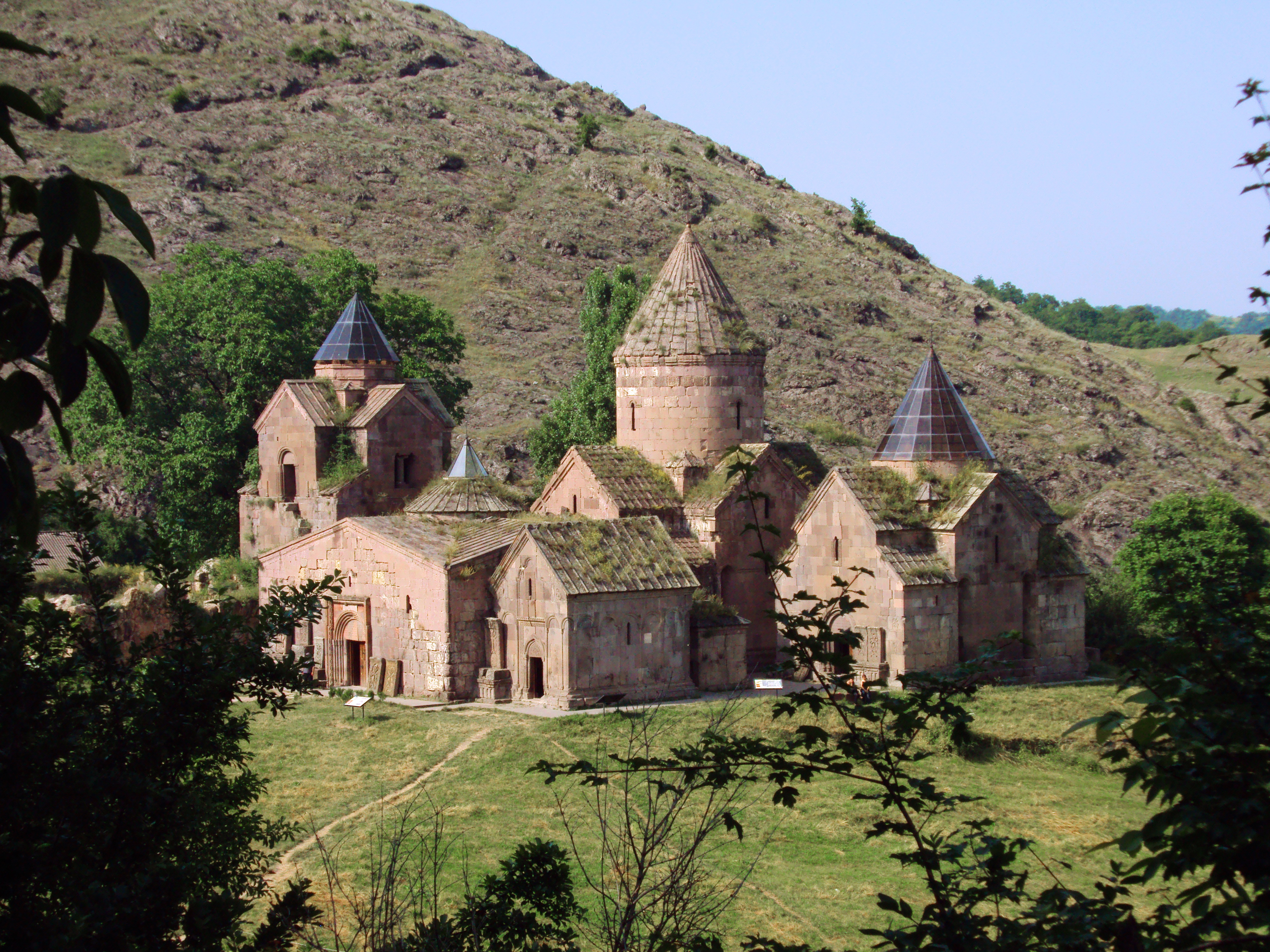
Goshavank, general view from south (from shrine of Mkhitar Gosh)

Goshavank monastery complex, October 2018

== Sources ==
- "Architectural Ensembles of Armenia", by O. Khalpakhchian, published in Moscow by Iskusstvo Publishers in 1980.
- "Rediscovering Armenia Guidebook", by Brady Kiesling and Raffi Kojian, published online and printed in 2005.
