= Mkhitar Gosh =

Armenian priest and public figure (1130–1213)

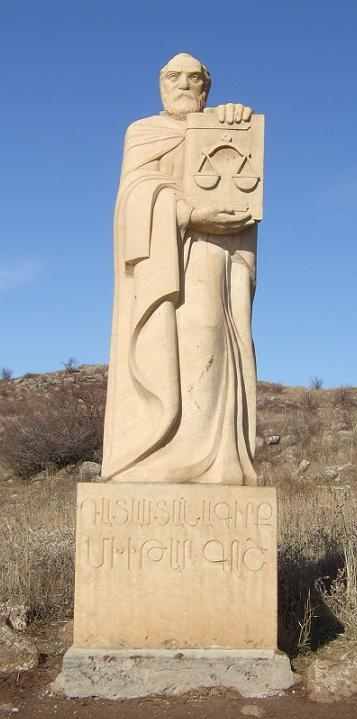
Statue of Mkhitar Gosh in Armenia, holding his famous book Datastanagirk (Book of Law), which is the first Armenian legal text to cover secular and ecclesiastical matters, begun in 1184. Gosh's code formed the basis for all later Armenian law codes, both that of Smbat in Cilican Armenia and those adaptations used in the diaspora farther afield.

Mkhitar Gosh (Armenian: Մխիթար Գոշ, romanized: Mkhit’ar Gosh 1130–1213) was an Armenian scholar, writer, public figure, thinker, and priest. He is a representative figure of the Armenian Renaissance.

== Biography ==
He was born in the city of Gandzak. He got his early education from public institutions. When he reached his adolescence he decided to dedicate his life to the church. To learn theology more thoroughly, Gosh traveled to Cilicia, to the Black Mountains (Sev lerner), and studied orthodox theology under the local priests. Upon his return, he, along with the princes' Zakare and Ivane Zakarian financial help, built the church of Getik.

He wrote a code of laws including civil and canon law that was used in both Greater Armenia and Cilicia. It was also used in Poland, by order of king Sigismund the Old, as the law under which the Armenians of Lviv and Kamianets-Podilskyi lived from 1519 until the region fell under Austrian rule in 1772. He also wrote several popular fables. He founded the monastery of Nor Getik, where he was later buried. Ever since his death it has become better known as Goshavank. The works of Mkhitar Gosh were later adapted into a law codex in Middle Armenian, which was prepared by Sempad the Constable, a 13th-century Cilician Armenian noble, military commander, and judge.

== See also ==
- Vardan of Aygek
