= List of Armenian writers =

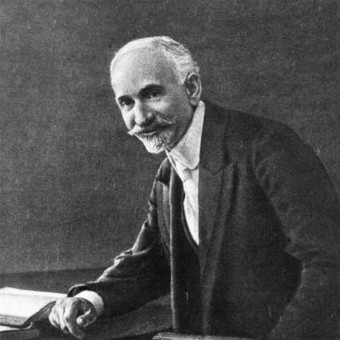
Hovhannes Tumanyan is considered to be the national poet of Armenia.

This is a list of Armenian authors, arranged chronologically.

== Earliest Writers ==
A select number of Armenians are known to have written in other languages such as Greek prior to the invention of the Armenian alphabet.

- Artavasdes II of Armenia (1st century BCE) — composer of Greek orations, tragedies, and histories, though none survive today.
- Prohaeresius (4th century CE) — sophist author of textbooks, though none survive today.

== Classical ==
Classical Armenian is the literary language of Armenia written during the 5th to 18th centuries.

=== 5th century ===
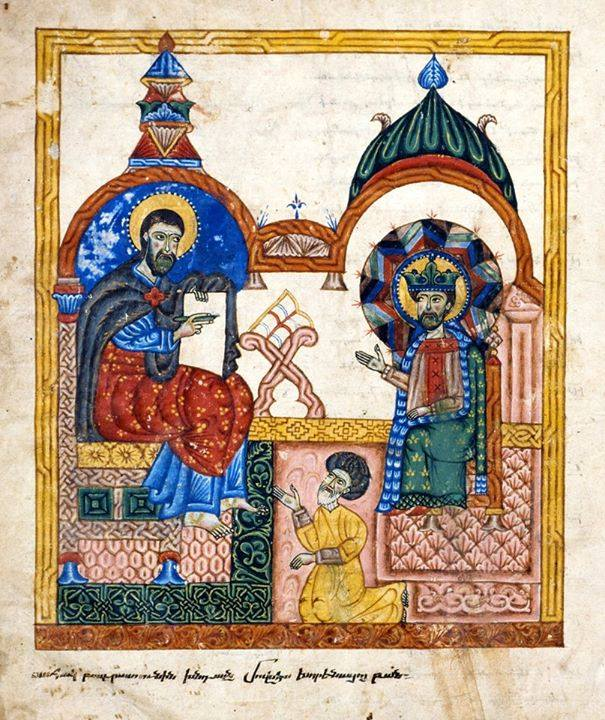
Movses Khorenatsi depicted in a 14th-century Armenian manuscript

- Agathangelos — historian, composer of an eponymous history that discusses the life of Saint Gregory the Illuminator.
- Elishe — historian, author of History of Vardan and the Armenian War.
- Faustus of Byzantium — historian, author of the Epic Histories.
- Ghazar Parpetsi — historian, author of an eponymous history.
- Koryun — historian, author of The Life of Mashtots.
- Mesrop Mashtots — theologian, inventor of the Armenian alphabet credited with leading the effort to translate the Bible into Armenian and for having composed many sharakans.
- Movses Khorenatsi — historian (dated to later centuries by some scholars), author of the History of Armenia.
- Sahak Partev — theologian, credited with writing several canons, sharakans, and a portion of the Armenian book of hours.
- Yeznik of Kolb — theologian, author of a work referred to as Refutation of the Sects or On God.
- Zenob Glak — historian, composer of the first part of John Mamikonean's History of Taron.

=== 6th century ===
- David Anhaght — Neoplatonic philosopher of several works, including propaedeutic handbooks (originally wrote in Greek with his works only surviving in Armenian translation)

=== 7th century ===
- Anania Shirakatsi — mathematician, philosopher, and geographer of many works including the Book of Arithmetic, Cosmology, and Geography.
- Davtak Kertogh — poet of the "Elegy on the Death of the Great Prince Jevansher."
- Hovnan Mayravanetsi — theologian of many work including Seal of Faith.
- Komitas Aghtsetsi — author of religious poetry including a sharakan dedicated to Saint Hripsime.
- John Mamikonean — author of the History of Taron.
- Sebeos — historian, author of an eponymous history.

=== 8th century ===
- Ghevond — historian, author of an eponymous history.
- Khosrovidukht — hymnographer and poet, author of the sharakan "More astonishing to me."
- Sahakdukht — hymnographer and poet, author of the sharakan "Saint Mary."

=== 9th century ===
- Esayi Abu-Muse — poet, author of a Letter to Bugha al-Kabir.
- Tovma Artsruni — historian, author of History of the House of Artsrunik.
- Leo the Mathematician — philosopher and logician, author of many works including a medical encyclopaedia, though they are mostly lost (wrote in Greek, Armenian ancestry debated by some scholars).
- Photios I of Constantinople — Ecumenical Patriarch of Constantinople (858—867, 877–886), theologian, author of many works including Bibliotheca and Amphilochia (wrote in Greek, Armenian ancestry debated by some scholars).

=== 10th century ===
- Anania Narekatsi — chronicler, theologian, author of several works including the Book of Confession.
- Joseph Genesius — chronicler, author of On the Reign of the Emperors (wrote in Greek).
- Hovhanes Draskhanakertsi — historian, author of an eponymous book of history.
- Khosrov of Andzev — theologian, author of works such as a commentary on the Armenian Liturgy of the Hours.
- Movses Kaghankatvatsi — historian, author of The History of the Caucasian Albanians.
- Nikephoros II Phokas — Byzantine Emperor (963—969) and credited as the author of the military manual Praecepta Militaria (wrote in Greek, Armenian ancestry debated by some scholars).
- Ukhtanes — historian, author of History in Three Parts.

=== 11th century ===
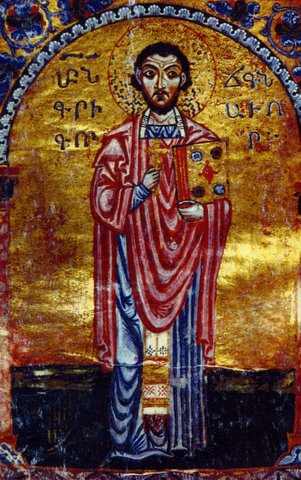
Grigor Narekatsi (12th century Armenian manuscript)

- Aristakes Lastivertsi — historian
- Grigor Magistros — author
- Gregory II the Martyrophile — translator
- Grigor Narekatsi — poet
- Hovhannes Imastaser — philosopher, mathematician, theologian, hymnologist
- Kekaumenos — writer, military strategist (wrote in Greek)
- Peter I of Armenia — hymnographer
- Stepanos Taronatsi — historian

=== 12th century ===
- Arysdaghes — author
- Basil the Doctor — poet
- Khachatur of Taron — poet
- Matteos Urhaetsi — historian
- Mkhitar Gosh — historian, author, legal scholar
- Mkhitar Heratsi — physician
- Gregory IV the Young — poet, theologian
- Grigor III Pahlavuni — hymnographer, translator
- Nerses Lambronatsi — poet
- Nerses Shnorhali — poet
- Samuel Anetsi — historian

=== 13th century ===
- Frik — poet
- Grigor Aknertsi — historian
- Hayton / Hethum — historian
- Hovhannes Erznkatsi — poet
- Kirakos Gandzaketsi — historian
- Mekhitar of Ayrivank — historian, theologian
- Stepanos Orbelyan — historian
- Smbat Sparapet — historian
- Terter Yerevantsi — poet
- Vardan Aigektsi — writer of fables
- Vardan Areveltsi — historian, author

=== 14th century ===
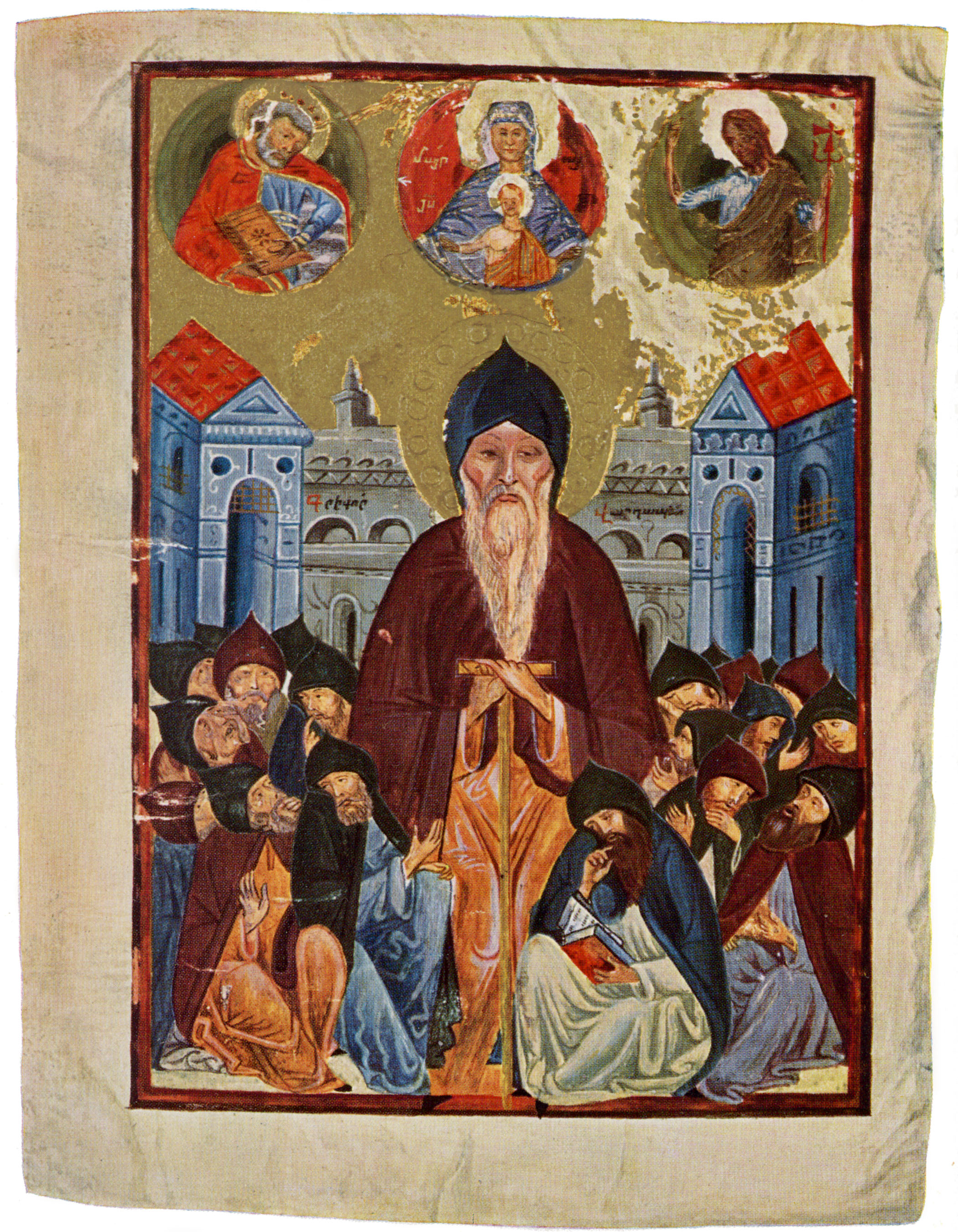
Grigor Tatevatsi (15th century Armenian manuscript)

- Nerses Balients — historian
- Grigor Tatevatsi — philosopher and theologian
- Thaddeus — translator

=== 15th century ===
- Amirdovlat of Amasia — physician, writer
- Hovhannes Tlkurantsi — poet
- Mkrtich Naghash — poet
- Tovma Metsopetsi — historian

=== 16th century ===
- Cristoforo Armeno — translator (wrote in Italian)
- Deacon Berdaktsi — poet
- Hovasap Sebastatsi — poet
- Nahapet Kuchak — poet
- Szymon Szymonowic — poet (wrote in Polish)

=== 17th century ===
- Arakel Davrijetsi — historian
- Giorgio Baglivi — physician, writer (wrote in Italian)
- Eremia Chelebi — writer
- Hovhannes Mrkuz Jughayetsi — theologian, philosopher
- Naghash Hovnatan — poet
- Sarmad Kashani — mystic, poet (wrote in Persian)
- Gomidas Keumurdjian — poet
- Khachatur of Kaffa — historian
- Martiros of Crimea — writer, poet, historian
- Simeon of Poland — writer
- Yovanisik Caretsi — writer
- Zakaria Aguletsi — merchant, traveler, writer
- Józef Bartłomiej Zimorowic — poet, historian (wrote in Polish)
- Mirza Zulqarnain – poet, politician

=== 18th century ===
- Abraham Kretatsi — historian
- Abraham Yerevantsi — historian
- Hovsep Arghutian — theologian, printer
- Alexander I of Julfa — theologian
- Abgar Ali Akbar Armani — writer (wrote in Persian)
- Tanburi Arutin — writer, traveler, musician
- Movses Baghramian — writer, activist
- Mikayel Chamchian — historian
- Baghdasar Dpir — poet
- Ignatius Mouradgea d'Ohsson – diplomat, historian (wrote in French)
- Joseph Emin — traveler, writer (wrote in English)
- Esayi Hasan-Jalalyan — historian
- Mkhitar Sebastatsi — writer, theologian, founded the Mekhitarist Order
- Grzegorz Piramowicz — writer (wrote in Polish)
- Sayat-Nova — poet
- Shahamir Shahamirian — writer, philosopher, merchant
- Simeon I of Yerevan — writer, founded the first printing press in Armenia

== Modern ==
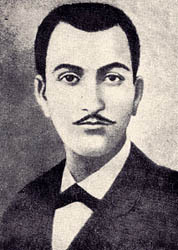
Bedros Tourian was a prominent Western Armenian lyric poet.

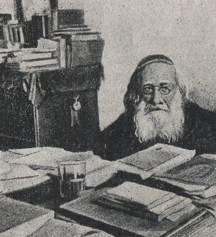
Ghevont Alishan was a prominent poet and scholar who wrote in Western and Classical Armenian.

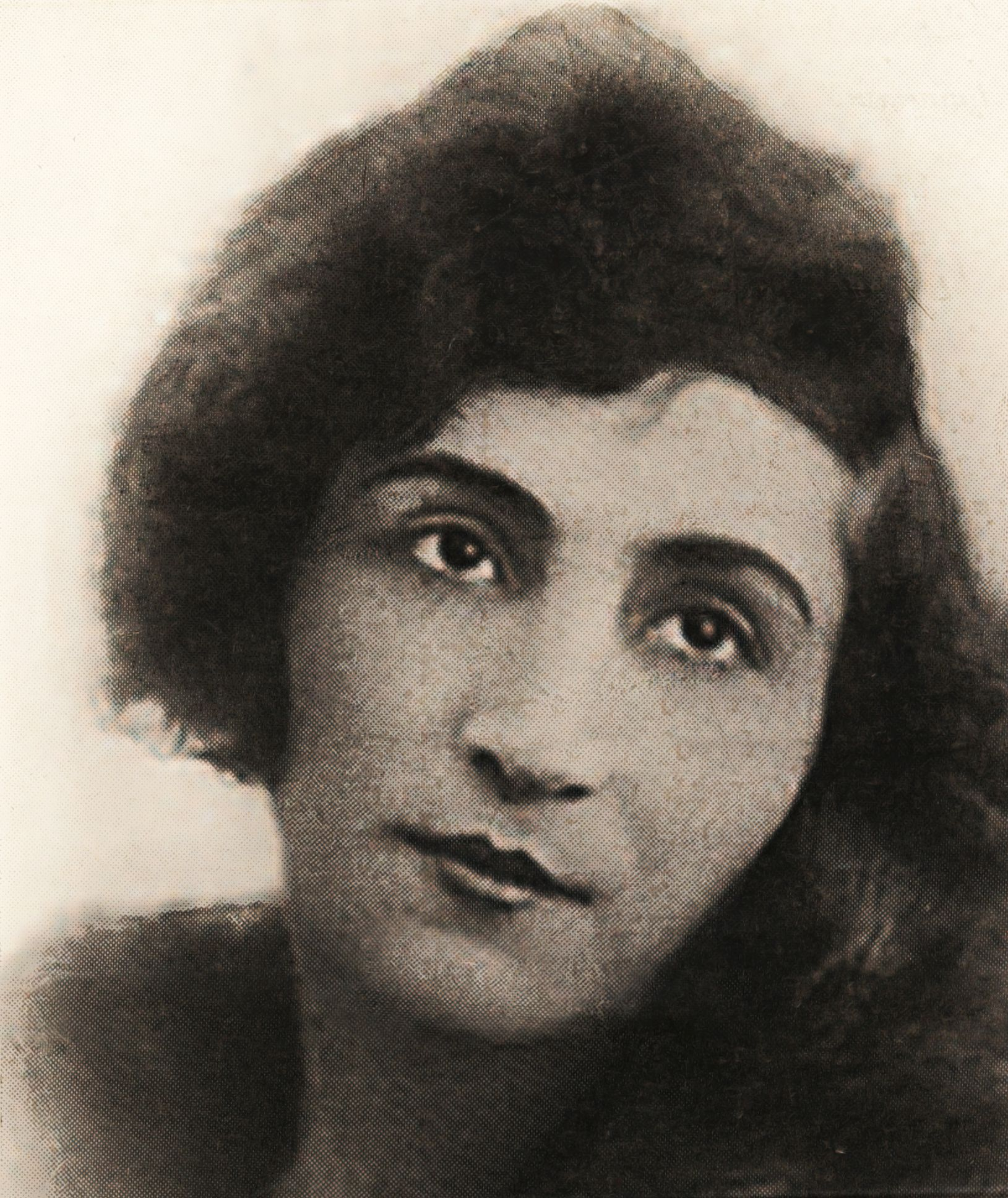
Louise Aslanian was a well-known French-Armenian writer and poet. She was killed in a Nazi concentration camp.

=== Western Armenian ===
- Iskander Abcarius (1826–1885)
- Yuhanna Abcarius (1832–1886)
- Hrachia Acharian (1876–1953)
- Mkrtich Achemian (1838–1917)
- Yervant Aghaton (1860–1935)
- Ghevont Alishan (1820–1901)
- Harutiun Alpiar (1864–1919)
- Aram Andonian (1875–1951)
- Arandzar (1877–1913)
- Arpiar Arpiarian (1851–1908)
- Gheorghe Asachi (1788–1869)
- Zabel Sibil Asadour (1863–1934)
- Hayk Asatryan (1900–1956)
- Kevork Aslan (born 1849)
- Kégham Atmadjian (1910–1940)
- Atrpet (1860–1937)
- Yevprime Avedisian (1872–1950)
- Mkrtich Avetisian (1864–1896)
- Arsen Aydinian (1825–1902)
- Arsen Bagratuni (1790–1866)
- Zaruhi Bahri (1880–1958)
- Alishan Bairamian (1914–2004)
- Anna Balakian (1915–1997)
- Grigoris Balakian (1877–1934)
- Nona Balakian (1918–1991)
- Berjouhi Bardizbanian-Parseghian (1886–1940)
- Hagop Baronian (1843–1891)
- Vaghinag Bekaryan (1891–1975)
- Reteos Berberian (1848–1907)
- Schahan Berberian (1891–1956)
- Mkrtich Beshiktashlian (1828–1868)
- Nshan Beshiktashlian (1898–1972)
- Mari Beyleryan (1877–1915)
- Zaven Biberyan (1921–1984)
- Zabelle Boyajian (1873–1957)
- Hovhannes Bujicanian (1873–1915)
- Pailadzou Captanian (1883–1962)
- Haroutioun Hovanes Chakmakjian (1878–1973)
- Arshag Chobanian (1872–1954)
- Dikran Chökürian (1884–1915)
- Vasile Conta (1845–1882)
- Diran Chrakian (1875–1921)
- Nazaret Daghavarian (1862–1915)
- Sirarpie Der Nersessian (1896–1989)
- Yeghishe Derderian of Jerusalem (1911–1990)
- Karekin Deveciyan (1868–1964)
- Agop Dilâçar (1895–1979)
- Arat Dink (born 1979)
- Hrant Dink (1954–2007)
- Armen Dorian (1892–1915)
- Srpouhi Dussap (1840–1901)
- Erukhan (1870–1915)
- Markar Esayan (1969–2020)
- Melkon Giurdjian (1859–1915)
- Yervant Gobelyan (1923–2010)
- Rober Haddeciyan (1926–2025)
- V. H. Hagopian
- Aram Haigaz (1900–1986)
- Hamastegh (1895–1966)
- Agop Handanyan (1834–1899)
- Ardashes Harutunian (1873–1915)
- Joseph Hekekyan (1807–1875)
- Leon Srabian Herald (1896–1976)
- Hovhannes Hintliyan (1866–1955)
- Hovhannes Hisarian (1826–1917)
- Matthew II Izmirlian (1845–1910)
- Harutiun Jangülian (1855–1915)
- Zaruhi Kalemkaryan (1871–1971)
- Diran Kelekian (1862–1915)
- Bedros Keresteciyan (1840–1909)
- Mkrtich Khrimian (1820–1907)
- Donabed Lulejian (1875–1915)
- Vahan Malezian (1871–1966)
- Malkhas (1877–1962)
- Arman Manukyan (1931–2012)
- Hayganuş Mark (1884–1966)
- Aurora Mardiganian (1901–1994)
- George Mardikian (1903–1977)
- Voskan Martikian (1867–1947)
- Misak Metsarents (1886–1908)
- Iskouhi Minas (1884–1951)
- Sarkis Minassian (1873–1915)
- Chavarche Missakian (1884–1957)
- Hrand Nazariantz (1886–1962)
- Sevan Nişanyan (born 1956)
- Krikor Odian (1834–1887)
- Yervant Odian (1869–1926)
- Hagop Oshagan (1883–1948)
- Kegham Parseghian (1883–1915)
- Levon Pashalian (1868–1943)
- Vrtanes Papazian (1866–1920)
- Krikor Peshtimaldjian (1778–1839)
- Smpad Piurad (1862–1915)
- Mekertich Portukalian (1848–1921)
- Nerses Pozapalian (1937–2009)
- Nahapet Rusinian (1819–1876)
- M. Salpi (1884–1968)
- Torkom Saraydarian (1917–1997)
- Hovhannes Setian (1853–1930)
- Ruben Sevak (1885–1915)
- Parsegh Shahbaz (1883–1915)
- Levon Shant (1869–1951)
- Siamanto (1878–1915)
- Garegin Srvandztiants (1840–1892)
- Harutiun Svadjian (1831–1874)
- Vahan Tekeyan (1878–1945)
- Teotig (1873–1928)
- Arshaguhi Teotig (1875–1922)
- Tovmas Terzian (1840–1909)
- Tlgadintsi (1860–1915)
- Toros Toramanian (1864–1934)
- Bedros Tourian (1851–1872)
- Yetvart Tomasyan (born 1949)
- Karapet Utudjian (1803–1904)
- Hovhannes Vahanian (1832–1891)
- Vartan Pasha (1813–1879)
- Daniel Varujan (1884–1915)
- Zabel Yesayan (1878–1943)
- Zahrad (1924–2007)
- Rupen Zartarian (1874–1915)
- Levon Zekiyan (born 1943)
- Krikor Zohrab (1861–1915)

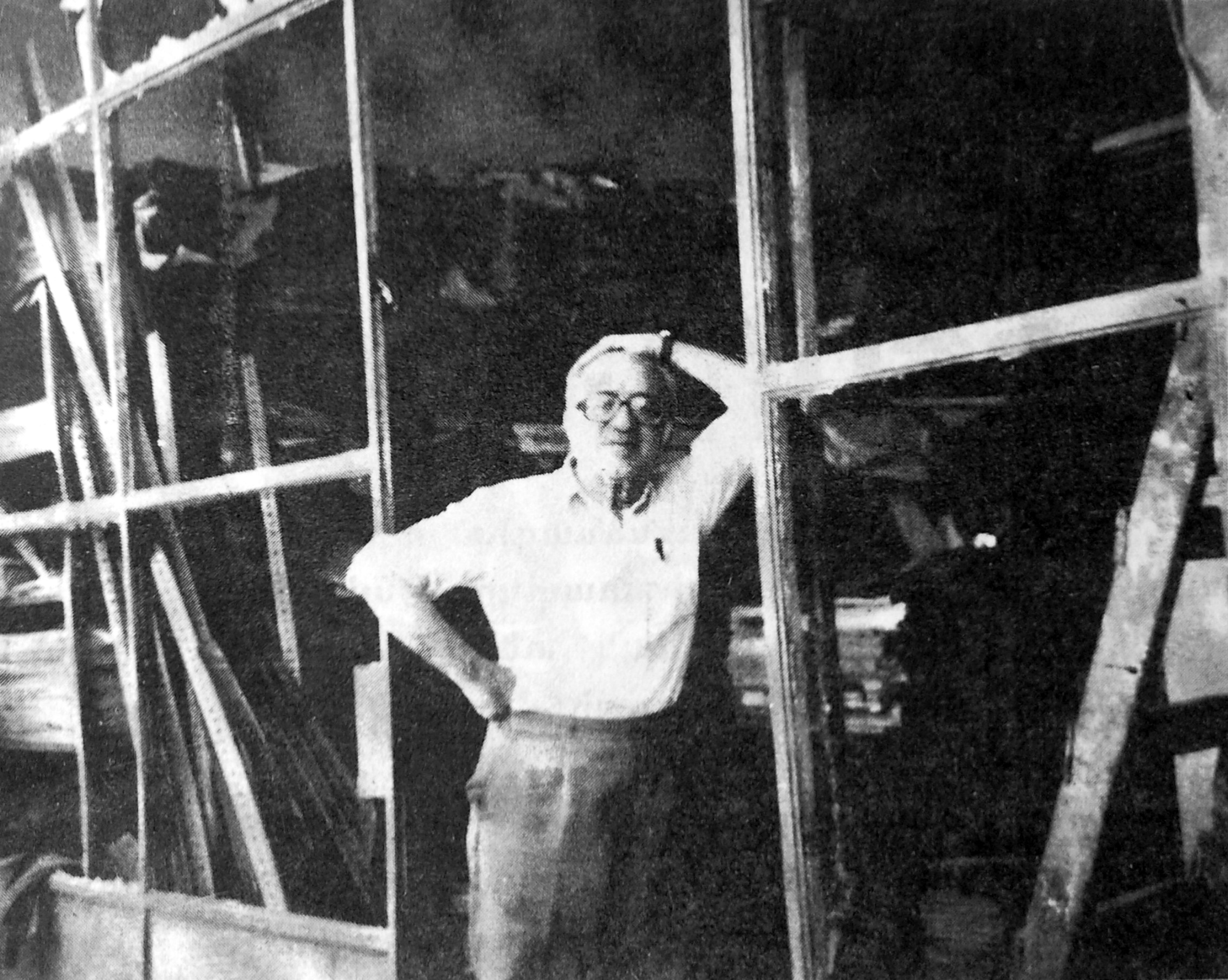
Simon Simonian near his "Sevan" publishing house in Beirut

=== Diaspora ===
- Marie Rose Abousefian (born 1944)
- Diana Abgar (1859–1937)
- Kajetan Abgarowicz (1856–1909)
- Adolf Abrahamowicz (1849–1899)
- Daron Acemoglu (born 1967)
- Arthur Adamov (1908–1970)
- Garnik Addarian (1925–1986)
- Serge Afanasyan (1913–1994)
- Abel Aganbegyan (born 1932)
- Vittoria Aganoor (1855–1910)
- Liana Aghajanian
- Kevork Ajemian (1932–1998)
- Karol Antoniewicz (1807–1852)
- Aram I (born 1946)
- Michael Arlen (1895–1956)
- Michael J. Arlen (born 1930)
- Yacoub Artin (1842–1919)
- Artine Artinian (1907–2005)
- Louise Aslanian (1906–1945)
- Sebouh David Aslanian
- Christopher Atamian
- Arlene Voski Avakian (born 1939)
- Armen Avanessian (born 1973)
- Leslie Ayvazian (born 1948)
- Ben Bagdikian (1920–2016)
- Maria Baghramian (born 1954)
- Peter Balakian (born 1951)
- Ara Baliozian (born 1936)
- Sadok Barącz (1814–1892)
- David Barsamian (born 1945)
- Armenag K. Bedevian (1884–1957)
- Krikor Beledian (born 1945)
- Vahe Berberian (born 1955)
- Nina Berberova (1901–1993)
- A. I. Bezzerides (1908–2007)
- Paul Boghossian (born 1957)
- Eric Bogosian (born 1953)
- Chris Bohjalian (born 1962)
- George Bournoutian (1943–2021)
- Gary Braver (born 1942)
- Berge Bulbulian (1925–2017)
- Vahan Cardashian (1882–1934)
- John Roy Carlson (Arthur Derounian) (1909–1991)
- Michael Casey (born 1947)
- Tatev Chakhian (born 1992)
- Levon Chorbajian (born 1942)
- Henri Cole (born 1956)
- Edward N. Costikyan (1924–2012)
- Aram D'Abro
- Armen Davoudian
- James Der Derian
- Arto Der Haroutunian (1940–1987)
- Diana Der Hovanessian (1934–2018)
- Ardashes Der-Khachadourian (1931–1993)
- Philippe Djian (born 1949)
- Marjorie Housepian Dobkin (1922–2013)
- Abraham Constantin Mouradgea d'Ohsson (1779–1851)
- Patrick Donabédian (born 1953)
- Antranig Dzarugian (1913–1989)
- Carol Edgarian (born 1962)
- Arda Arsenian Ekmekji (born 1951)
- Nina Gabrielyan (1953–2026)
- Daria Gamsaragan (1907–1986)
- Nina Garsoïan (1923–2022)
- Richard Giragosian (born 1965)
- Vartan Gregorian (1934–2021)
- Bedros Hadjian (1933–2012)
- Edward Haghverdian (born 1952)
- Zbigniew Herbert (1924–1998)
- Richard G. Hovannisian (1932–2023)
- Garabet Ibrăileanu (1871–1936)
- David Ignatius (born 1950)
- Tadeusz Isakowicz-Zaleski (1956–2024)
- Moushegh Ishkhan (1913–1990)
- Seta Kabranian-Melkonian (born 1963)
- Laura Kalpakian (born 1945)
- Karekin I (1932–1999)
- Garry Kasparov (born 1963)
- Vahé Katcha (1928–2003)
- Martiros Kavoukjian (1908–1988)
- Armen Kazaryan (born 1963)
- Jean-Claude Kebabdjian (born 1943)
- Joseph A. Kéchichian (born 1954)
- Raymond Kévorkian (born 1953)
- David Kherdian (born 1931)
- Ervand Kogbetliantz (1888–1974)
- Karen Kondazian (born 1941)
- Garbis Kortian (1938–2009)
- Nancy Kricorian (born 1960)
- Pietro Kuciukian (born 1940)
- Vahan Kurkjian (1863–1961)
- Maddox (born 1977 or 1978)
- M. M. Mangasarian (1859–1943)
- Torkom Manoogian (1919–2012)
- Missak Manouchian (1906–1944)
- Christina Maranci (born 1968)
- Micheline Aharonian Marcom (born 1968)
- J. C. Mardrus (1868–1949)
- Ned Markosian
- Gohar Markosjan-Käsper (1949–2015)
- Hovhannes Masehyan (1864–1931)
- Hrach Martirosyan (born 1964)
- Ioan Mire Melik (1840–1889)
- Markar Melkonian
- William Michaelian (born 1956)
- Arpik Missakian (1926–2015)
- Bethany Mooradian (born 1975)
- Tom "Tatos" Mooradian (1928–2024)
- Khatchig Mouradian
- Sergei Movsesian (born 1978)
- Claude Mutafian (born 1942)
- Pete Najarian (born 1940)
- Santiago Nazarian (born 1977)
- Vera Nazarian (born 1966)
- Arthur Nersesian
- Mirza Yusuf Nersesov (1798–1864)
- Anahid Nersessian
- Vrej Nersessian (born 1948)
- Vahé Oshagan (1922–2000)
- Josh Pahigian (born 1974)
- Yervant Pamboukian (born 1933)
- Razmik Panossian (born 1961)
- Papken Papazian (1915–1990)
- Tsvetana Paskaleva (born 1960)
- Mikhail Piotrovsky (born 1944)
- Zoya Pirzad (born 1952)
- Ermance Rejebian (1906–1989)
- R. J. Rushdoony (1916–2001)
- William S. Sahakian (1922–1986)
- Thomas J. Samuelian (born 1956)
- Varaz Samuelian (1917–1995)
- Nigoghos Sarafian (1905–1973)
- Aram Saroyan (born 1943)
- Strawberry Saroyan (born 1970)
- William Saroyan (1908–1981)
- Harut Sassounian (born 1950)
- Sevda Sevan (1945–2009)
- Shahan Shahnour (1903–1974)
- Simon Simonian (1914–1986)
- Hazel Skaggs (1920–2005)
- George Stambolian (1938–1991)
- Ronald Grigor Suny (born 1940)
- Anahide Ter Minassian (1929–2019)
- Philip Terzian (born 1950)
- Tovmas Terzian (1840–1909)
- Meline Toumani (born 1975)
- Henri Troyat (1911–2007)
- Anna Astvatsaturian Turcotte (born 1978)
- Artur Ustian (born 1973)
- Vahe Vahian (1908–1998)
- Sona Van (born 1952)
- Varand (born 1954)
- Alexander Varbedian (born 1943)
- Hrag Vartanian (born 1973)
- Vazgen I (1908–1994)
- Zareh Vorpuni (1902–1980)
- Avedis Yapoudjian (1931–2017)
- Michael Zadoorian (born 1957)

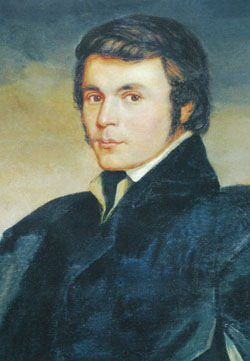
Khachatur Abovian is considered to be the founder of Modern Armenian literature.

=== Eastern Armenian ===
==== Tsarist era ====
- Artashes Abeghyan (1878–1955)
- Manuk Abeghyan (1865–1944)
- Khachatur Abovian (1809–1848)
- Nicholas Adontz (1871–1942)
- Ghazaros Aghayan (1840–1911)
- Nikol Aghbalian (1875–1947)
- Avetis Aharonian (1866–1948)
- Gabriel Aivazovsky (1812–1879)
- Harutyun Alamdaryan (1795–1834)
- Davit Ananun (1880–1942)
- Khnko Aper (1870–1935)
- Hambardzum Arakelian (1865–1918)
- Grigor Artsruni (1845–1892)
- Alexander Atabekian (1868–1933)
- Gevorg Gharadjian (1861–1936)
- Hayk Gyulikevkhyan (1886–1951)
- Abraham Gyulkhandanyan (1875–1946)
- Hakob Hakobian (1866–1937)
- Hovhannes Hovhannisyan (1864–1929)
- Ashkharbek Kalantar (1884–1942)
- Karekin I (Cilicia) (1867–1952)
- Ruben Khan-Azat (1862–1929)
- Alexander Khatisian (1874–1945)
- Garegin Khazhak (1867–1915)
- Shushanik Kurghinian (1876–1927)
- Yervand Lalayan (1864–1931)
- Leo (Arakel Babakhanian) (1860–1932)
- Anton Mailyan (1880–1942)
- Stepan Malkhasyants (1857–1947)
- Khachatur Malumian (1963–1915)
- Hakob Manandian (1873–1952)
- Andranik Migranyan (born 1949)
- Christapor Mikaelian (1859–1905)
- Muratsan (1854–1908)
- Mikael Nalbandian (1829–1866)
- Nar-Dos (1867–1933)
- Avetis Nazarbekian (1866–1939)
- Stepanos Nazarian (1812–1879)
- Garegin Nzhdeh (1886–1955)
- Armen Ohanian (1887–1976)
- Raphael Patkanian (1830–1892)
- Pertch Proshian (1837–1907)
- Raffi (1835–1888)
- Stepan Sapah-Gulian (1861–1928)
- Smbat Shahaziz (1840–1908)
- Alexander Shirvanzade (1858–1935)
- Suren Spandaryan (1882–1916)
- Gabriel Sundukian (1825–1912)
- Vardges Sureniants (1860–1921)
- Mesrop Taghiadian (1803–1858) (wrote mainly in Classical Armenian)
- Ruben Ter Minasian (1882–1951)
- Vahan Terian (1885–1920)
- Alexander Tsaturyan (1865–1917)
- Tserents (1822–1888)
- Hovhannes Tumanyan (1869–1923)
- Mikayel Varandian (1870–1934)
- Simon Vratsian (1882–1963)
- Gostan Zarian (1885–1969)
- Simon Zavarian (1866–1913)
- Stepan Zorian (1867–1919)

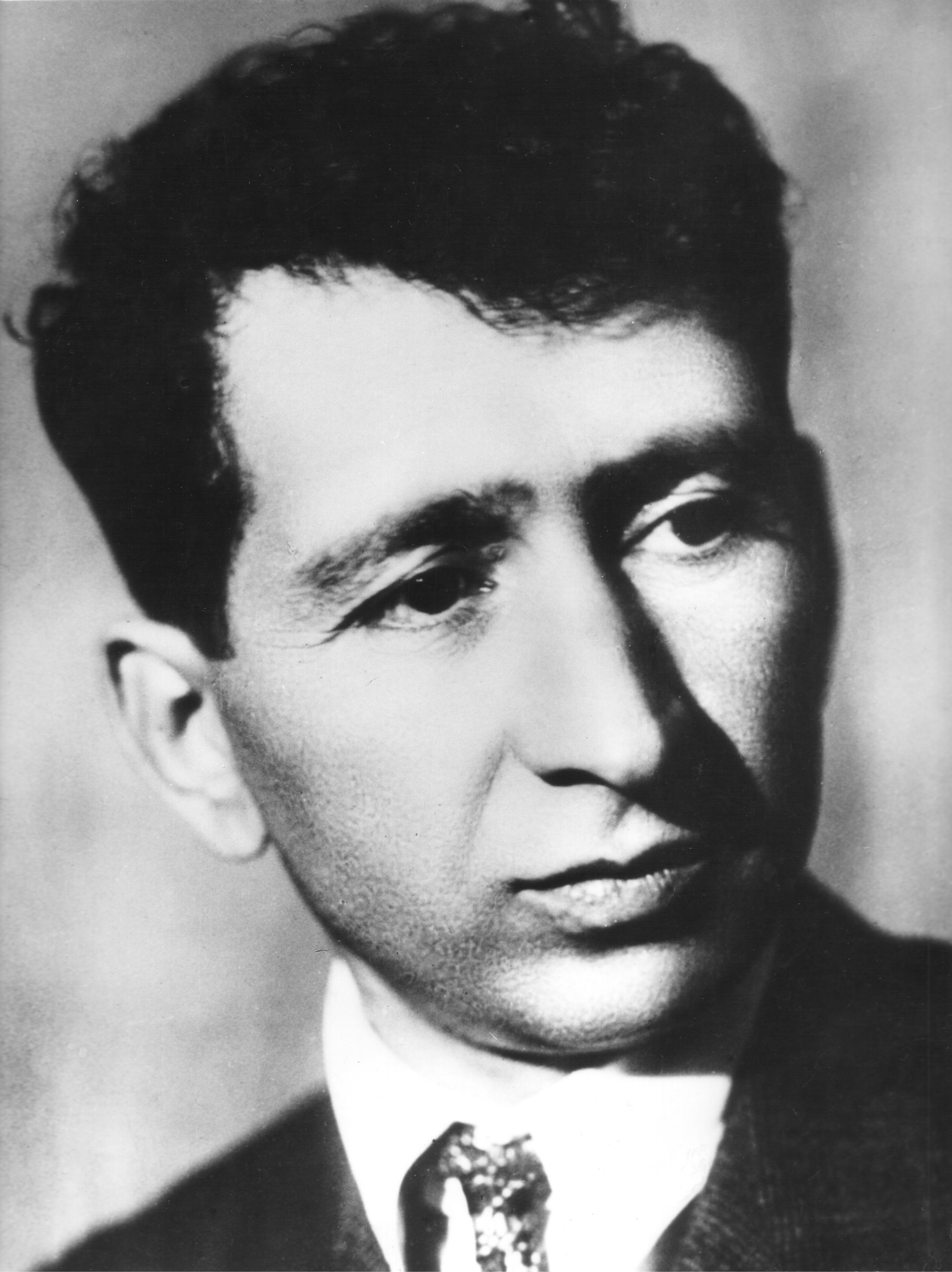
Yeghishe Charents fell victim to the Great Purge in 1937.

==== Soviet era ====
- Gevorg Abajian (1920–2002)
- Abel Aganbegyan (born 1932)
- Ashot G. Abrahamian (1903–1983)
- Henrik Abrahamyan (1939–1999)
- Sargis Abrahamyan (1915–1969)
- Evgeny Aramovich Abramyan (1930–2014)
- Nora Adamian (1910–1991)
- Suren Aghababyan (1922–1986)
- Eduard Aghayan (1913–1991)
- Tsatur Aghayan (1912–1982)
- Argam Aivazian (born 1947)
- Vahram Alazan (1903–1966)
- Viktor Ambartsumian (1908–1996)
- Levon Ananyan (1946–2013)
- Vakhtang Ananyan (1905–1980)
- Zhirayr Ananyan (1934–2004)
- Artashes Arakelian (1909–1993)
- Babken Arakelyan (1912–2004)
- Gregory Areshian (1949–2020)
- Sen Arevshatyan (1928–2014)
- Mkrtich Armen (1906–1972)
- Klara Ashrafyan (1924–1999)
- Don Askarian (1949–2018)
- Suren Ayvazyan (1933–2009)
- Axel Bakunts (1899–1937)
- Zori Balayan (born 1935)
- Aram Barlezizyan (1937–2022)
- Hrach Bartikyan (1927–2011)
- Gurgen Boryan (1915–1971)
- Arpenik Charents (1932–2008)
- Yeghishe Charents (1897–1937)
- Margarita Darbinyan (1920–2021)
- Khachik Dashtents (1910–1974)
- Razmik Davoyan (1940–2022)
- Vahagn Davtyan (1922–1996)
- Derenik Demirchian (1877–1956)
- Hripsime Djanpoladian (1918–2004)
- Gourgen Edilyan (1885–1942)
- El-Registan (1899–1945)
- Gevorg Emin (1918–1998)
- Karo Ghafadaryan (1907–1976)
- Grigor Ghapantsyan (1887–1957)
- Hayk Ghazaryan (1930–2014)
- George Goyan (1901–1982)
- Samvel Grigoryan (1907–1987)
- Grigor Gurzadyan (1922–2014)
- Artem Harutyunyan (born 1945)
- Levon Harutyunyan (1927–2007)
- Varazdat Harutyunyan (1909–2008)
- Zhora Harutyunyan (1928–2002)
- Morus Hasratyan (1902–1979)
- Murad Hasratyan (1935–2026)
- Hayrapet Hayrapetyan (1874–1962)
- Ashot Hovhannisian (1887–1972)
- Konstantine Hovhannisyan (1911–1984)
- Ruben Hovsepyan (1939–2016)
- Avetik Isahakyan (1875–1957)
- Rafayel Ishkhanian (1922–1995)
- Gevorg Jahukyan (1920–2005)
- Edward Jrbashian (1923–1999)
- Artashes Kalantarian (1931–1991)
- Ler Kamsar (1888–1965)
- Silva Kaputikyan (1919–2006)
- Hakob Karapents (1925–1994)
- Genrikh Kasparyan (1910–1995)
- Levon Khachikyan (1918–1982)
- Zorayr Khalapyan (1933–2008)
- Artemic Khalatov (1894–1937)
- Sokrat Khanyan (born 1930)
- Sero Khanzadyan (1916–1998)
- Konstantin Khudaverdyan (1929–1999)
- Lendrush Khurshudyan (1927–1999)
- John Kirakosyan (1929–1985)
- Hrachya Kochar (1910–1965)
- Mikayel Kotanyan (1927–1999)
- Srbui Lisitsian (1893–1979)
- Gurgen Mahari (1903–1969)
- Maro Markarian (1915–1999)
- Georgi Martirosian (1895–1938)
- Hrant Matevosyan (1935–2002)
- Metakse (1926–2014)
- Gaguik Oganessian (1947–2015)
- Joseph Orbeli (1887–1961)
- Ruben Orbeli (1880–1943)
- Aramashot Papayan (1911–1988)
- Rafael Papayan (1942–2010)
- Alvard Petrossyan (1946–2022)
- Vardges Petrosyan (1932–1994)
- Aramais Sahakyan (1936–2013)
- Tatshat Sahakyan (1916–1999)
- Alexander Sahinian (1910–1982)
- Anahit Sahinyan (1917–2010)
- Ashot Sahratyan (1936–2015)
- Hamo Sahyan (1914–1993)
- Khoren Sargsian (1891–1970)
- Gagik Sargsyan (1926–1998)
- Sarmen (1901–1984)
- Gegham Saryan (1902–1976)
- Paruyr Sevak (1924–1971)
- Marietta Shaginyan (1888–1982)
- Sebastian Shaumyan (1916–2007)
- Hovhannes Shiraz (1915–1984)
- Vano Siradeghyan (1946–2021)
- Hmayak Siras (1902–1983)
- Verjine Svazlian (born 1934)
- Karen Swassjan (1948–2024)
- Nikoghos Tahmizian (1926–2011)
- Armen Takhtajan (1910–2009)
- Aram Ter-Ghevondyan (1928–1988)
- Alla Ter-Sarkisiants (1937–2019)
- Arsen Terteryan (1882–1953)
- Vahan Totovents (1889–1937)
- Anahit Tsitsikian (1926–1999)
- Kamo Udumian (1927–2011)
- Bagrat Ulubabyan (1925–2001)
- Vagharsh Vagharshian (1894–1959)
- Seda Vermisheva (1932–2020)
- Suren Yeremian (1908–1992)
- Karen Yuzbashyan (1927–2009)
- Nairi Zarian (1900–1969)
- Perch Zeytuntsyan (1938–2017)
- Stepan Zoryan (1889–1967)
- Manvel Zulalyan (1929–2012)

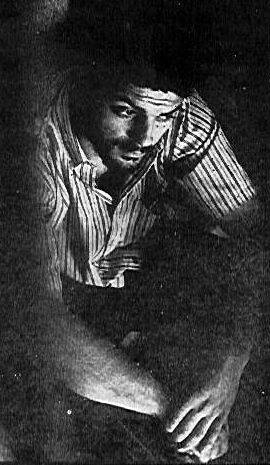
Sipan Shiraz

==== Independence era ====
- Narine Abgaryan (born 1971)
- Levon Abrahamian (born 1947)
- Zhirayr Agavelyan (born 1955)
- Narine Aghabalyan (born 1967)
- Victoria Aleksanyan (born 1987)
- Ara Aloyan (born 1981)
- Zaven Andriasian (born 1989)
- Mesrop Aramian (born 1966)
- Garnik Asatrian (born 1953)
- Bagrat Asatryan (born 1956)
- Anush Aslibekyan (born 1981)
- Armen Ayvazyan (born 1964)
- Edik Baghdasaryan (born 1962)
- Hrant Bagratyan (born 1958)
- Artsvi Bakhchinyan (born 1971)
- Ashot Beglarian (born 1968)
- Pavel Chobanyan (1948–2017)
- Levon Chookaszian (born 1952)
- Hayk Demoyan (born 1975)
- Henrik Edoyan (born 1940)
- Artashes Emin (born 1963)
- Lilit Galstyan (born 1962)
- Ruben Gasparyan (1962–2013)
- Razmik Grigoryan (born 1985)
- Elda Grin (1928–2016)
- Susanna Gyulamiryan (born 1961)
- Ruben Hakhverdyan (born 1950)
- Andranik Hakobyan (born 1959)
- Tatul Hakobyan (born 1969)
- Artem Harutyunyan (born 1945)
- Susanna Harutyunyan (born 1963)
- Paruyr Hayrikyan (born 1949)
- Gayane Hovhannisyan (born 1965)
- Garnik A. Karapetyan (1958–2018)
- Ruben Karapetyan (born 1963)
- Samvel Karapetyan (1961–2020)
- Lusine Kharatyan (born 1977)
- Levon Khechoyan (1955–2014)
- Arman Kirakossian (1956–2019)
- Hayk Kotanjian (born 1945)
- Khachik Manukyan (born 1964)
- Yervand Margaryan (born 1961)
- Vahram Martirosyan (born 1959)
- Karen Matevosyan (born 1958)
- Ruben Mirzakhanyan (born 1959)
- Samvel Mkrtchyan (1959–2014)
- David Mouradian (born 1951)
- Gohar Muradyan (born 1957)
- Ashot Nadanian (born 1972)
- Albert Nalchajyan (born 1939)
- Aram Pachyan (born 1983)
- Ara Papian (born 1961)
- Marine Petrossian (born 1960)
- Hamlet Petrosyan (born 1955)
- Mariam Petrosyan (born 1969)
- Arshak Poladian (born 1950)
- Ruben Safrastyan (born 1955)
- Vahram Sahakian (born 1964)
- Edward Sandoyan (born 1961)
- Samvel Sevada (born 1949)
- Armen Shekoyan (1953–2021)
- Sipan Shiraz (1967–1997)
- Babken Simonyan (born 1952)
- Vano Siradeghyan (1946–2021)
- Meruzhan Ter-Gulanyan (born 1948)
- Armen Trchounian (1956–2020)
- Hovik Vardoumian (born 1940)
- Ashot Voskanyan (born 1949)

== See also ==
- Armenian literature
