= Yervand =

Yervand (Armenian: Երվանդ) and in some transliterations Ervand (in Western Armenian Yervant), is an Armenian given name. The Hellenic equivalent is Orontes.

Ervand / Yervand / Yervant may refer to:

== Ervand ==
- Ervand Abrahamian (born 1940) Marxist historian of Middle Eastern and particularly Iranian history
- Ervand Kogbetliantz (1888–1974), Armenian/American mathematician and first president of the Yerevan State University

== Orontes ==
- Orontes I Sakavakyats (native Armenian name Yervand I Sakavakyats), king of the Orontid dynasty, reigning in the period between 570 BC – 560 BC.
- Orontes I (native Armenian name Yervand I), Orontid dynasty king who reigned during the period between 401 BC – 344 BC
- Orontes II (native Armenian name Yervand II), son of Orontes I, ruler of the Satrapy of Armenia
- Orontes III (native Armenian name Yervand III), King of Armenia
- Orontes IV (native Armenian name Yervand IV), son of King Arsames and founder of Yervandashat.

== Yervand ==
- Yervand Kochar (1899-1979), Armenian sculptor and artist
- Yervand Krbachyan (born 1971), Armenian football player
- Yervand Lalayan (1864-1931), Armenian ethnographer, archaeologist, folklorist
- Yervand Manaryan (born 1924), Iranian-born Armenian actor
- Yervand Margaryan (born 1961), Armenian historian
- Yervand Mkrtchyan (born 1996), Armenian runner
- Yervand Sukiasyan (born 1967), Armenian football player
- Yervand Zakharyan (born 1946), Armenian politician and the former mayor of Yerevan

== Yervant ==
- Yervant Aghaton (1860–1935), Armenian political figure, agronomist, publisher, writer, and one of the founding members of the Armenian General Benevolent Union
- Yervant Gobelyan (1923–2010), Turkish Armenian poet and writer
- Yervant Odian (1869–1926), Armenian satirist and writer
- Yervant Pamboukian (born 1933), Armenian historian
- Yervant Srmakeshkhanlian (pen name Erukhan, 1870–1915), Armenian writer
- Yervant Terzian (1939–2019), Armenian-American astronomer
- Yervant Voskan, also known as Osgan Efendi (1855–1914), Ottoman Armenian painter, sculptor, instructor
- Yervant Zorian, American electrical engineer

== See also ==
- Orontes (disambiguation)
- Yervandashat (ancient city)
- Yervandashat, Armenia, a village
