= Ustian =

Ustian is a surname. Notable people with the surname include:

- Artur Ustian (born 1973), Russian-Armenian political scientist
- Daniel Ustian, American business executive
- Ion Ustian (born 1939), Moldovan politician
