= Orontes =

Orontes (/ɔːˈrɒntiːz, oʊˈrɒn-/) may refer to:

== People ==
- various members of the Armenian Orontid dynasty (their name, also rendered as Orontas, Orondes, Aroandes, is the Hellenized form of the Iranian masculine name Avestan, from auruuant sometimes shortened to auruuat, Persian arvand, meaning "Of greatness, mighty":
  - Orontes I Sakavakyats, a legendary king of Armenia
  - Orontes I (died 344 BC), Achaemenid Empire military officer and satrap of Armenia
  - Orontes II, Persian 4th century BC noble, probably satrap of Armenia
  - Orontes III (died 260 BC), King of Armenia
  - Orontes IV (died 200 BC), King of Armenia

== Ships ==
- HMS Orontes, several ships of the Royal Navy
- RMS Orontes, a steam ocean liner launched in 1902, a troopship in the First World War.
- SS Orontes, a passenger ship launched in 1929, a troopship in the Second World War

== Other uses ==
- Orontes River, in Lebanon, Syria, and Turkey
  - Orontes, a mythological Indian leader whom the river is supposedly named after, as told in book 17 of the Greek epic poem Dionysiaca
- Orontes, a character mentioned in The Aeneid who is killed when his ship is swallowed by a whirlpool

== See also ==
- Yervand
