= Arysdaghes =

Armenian writer

Arysdaghes an Armenian writer, born in High Armenia in about 1178. He pursued his studies in the Monastery of Sghevra, near the castle of Lampron, in Cilicia taught rhetoric in several provinces of Armenia, died at Sis in 1239.
