= Pietro Kuciukian =

Italian-Armenian writer, surgeon, and activist

Pietro Kuciukian (born 18 January 1940) is an Italian writer and surgeon of Armenian descent. He is also the president of International Committee for the Righteous of Armenians and Co-Founder of The Gardens of the Righteous Worldwide Committee. He collaborates with the Armenian Genocide Museum in Yerevan and is the founder of the “Memory is the Future” Committee, a project to sponsor Armenian cultural projects.

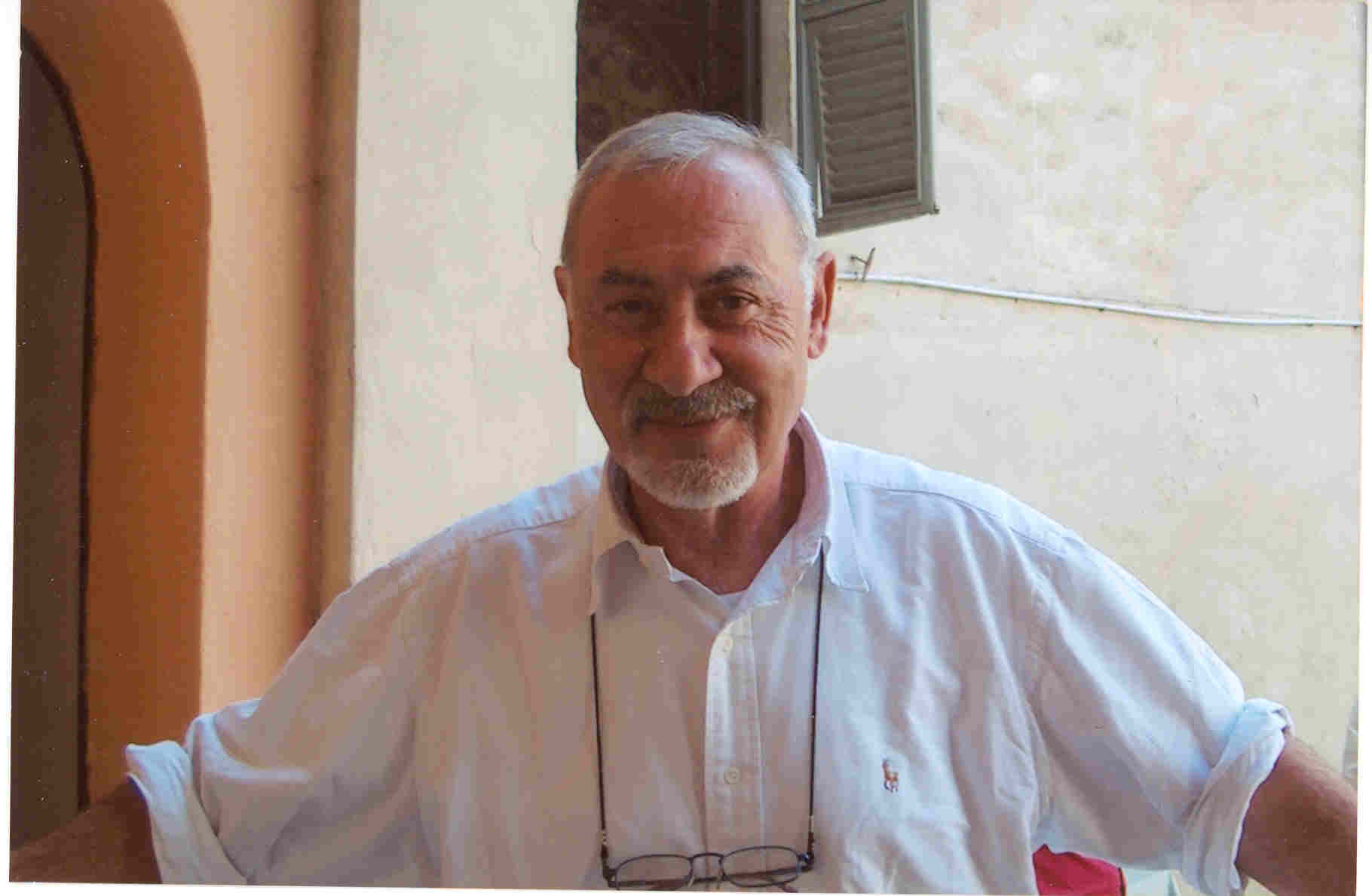
Picture of Pietro Kuciukian

== Life ==
Of Armenian descent, Pietro Kuciukian was born in Arco, Trento, Italy. The Kuciukian family were originally from the Sivas region of the Ottoman Empire.

His father Ignatio, was sent to Italy by his father Andon at the age of twelve in order to be saved from the Armenian genocide. Ignatio eventually went to the San Lazzaro degli Armeni, near Venice to get an education. He continued his education in Turin where he graduated with a Medical Degree. He then continued his studies in Paris as well. Ignatio got his first job as a doctor and radiologist in Trento, where he would spend the rest of his life. Like his father, Kuciukian studied at the Mekhitarist School at the San Lazzaro degli Armeni Island off the coast of Venice. He continued his education at the University of Padua and graduated with a degree in Medicine and Surgery in 1964.

After the earthquake in Armenia in 1988, he went to the disaster zone to help those in need. Kuciukian worked to install an outpatient clinic in Spitak and two schools in Stepanavan. On March 16, 2007, Kuciukian was appointed Honorary Council of Armenia to Italy. He currently manages Italy-Armenia relations on behalf of the Embassy of Armenia.

== Books ==
- Le terre di Nairi, viaggio in Armenia, Guerini, Milan 1994, ISBN 88-7802-543-7
- Viaggio tra i cristiani d’oriente, Guerini, Milan 1997, ISBN 88-7802-734-0
- Dispersi, viaggio fra le comunità armene nel mondo, Guerini, Milan 1998, ISBN 88-7802-954-8
- Voci nel deserto. Giusti e testimoni per gli armeni, Guerini, Milan 2000, ISBN 88-8335-167-3
- Il Giardino di tenebra. Viaggio nel Nagorno Karabgh, Guerini, Milan 2003, ISBN 88-8335-413-3
- La terza Armenia. Viaggio nel Caucaso post-sovietico, Guerini, Milan 2007, ISBN 88-8335-846-5

== Recognition ==
In January 2003 he was awarded by the City of Milan's "Ambrogino d'Oro", the city's highest official recognition, for his activities in the research of the "Righteous for the Armenians."

In 2006 he received from the Governor of the Province of Milan the "Gold Medal of Gratitude" for his work in the Genocide Museum and memorial in Armenia.
