= Anush Aslibekyan =

Armenian theater critic, novelist, playwright

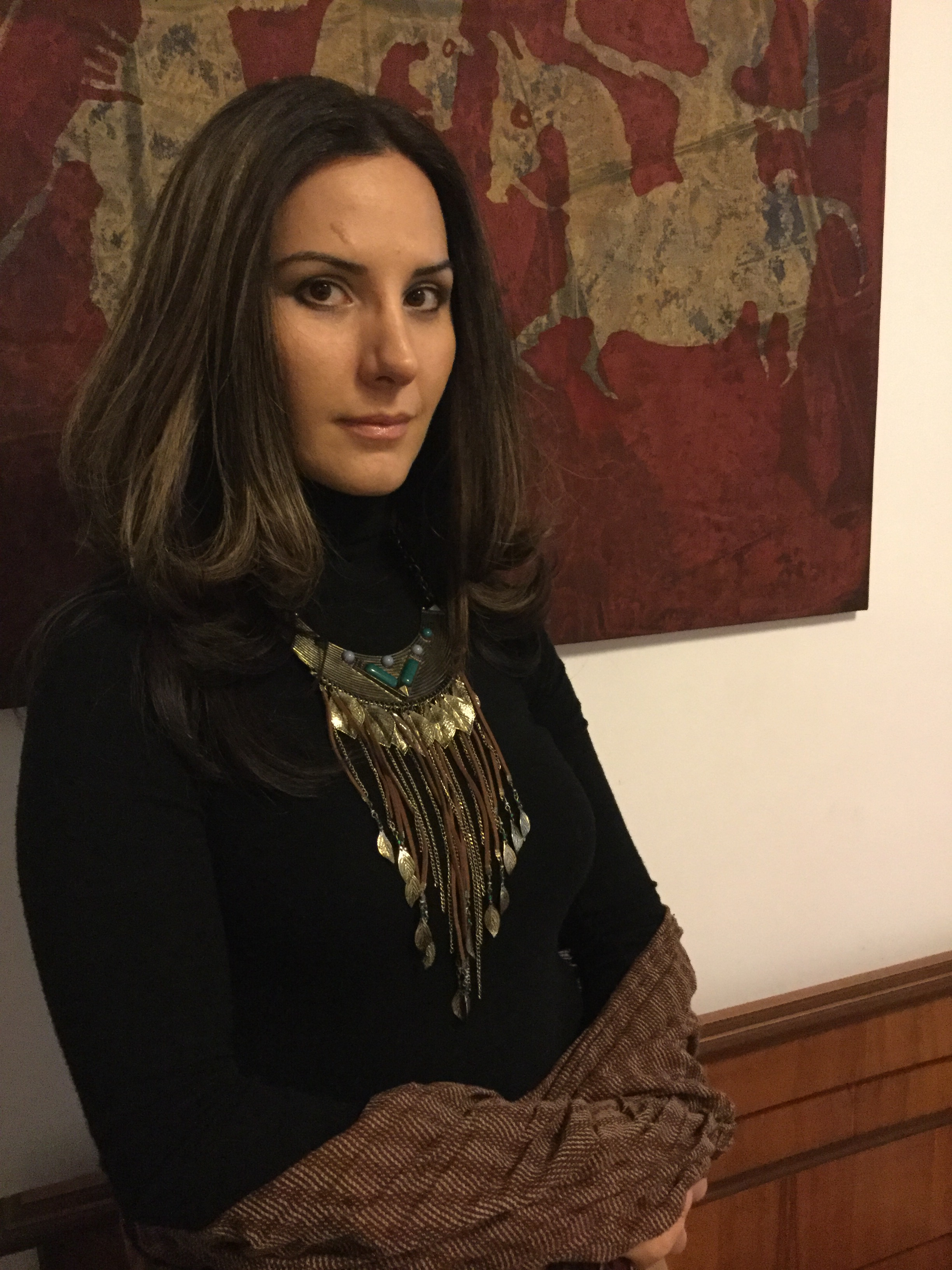
- Born: March 4, 1981 (age 45); Sevan, Armenia
- Citizenship: Armenian
- Occupations: theater critic, novelist, playwright
- Years active: 1999-

Anush Aslibekyan (Armenian: Անուշ Ասլիբեկյան, born March 4, 1981) is an Armenian theater critic, novelist, playwright. Member of the Writers Union of Armenia (2012) and National Theatrical Creative Union. In 2018 Aslibekyan got her PhD in arts. Aslibekyan's works have been translated into Polish, German, Greek and Russian.

== Biography ==
Anush Aslibekyan was born in 1981 in Sevan. She graduated from the Yerevan State Institute of Theatre and Cinematography, 2003-2006 she did her post-graduate study at the Department of Theatre history and theory of the same Institute. 2000-2005 Anush has been the founder and senior editor at "Arvest" Art Magazine, 2008-2009 - Head of literature department at "Hamazgayin" State Theatre, 2008 – 2010 - TV anchor, reporter, commentator at Ararat TV of Public Television Company of Armenia, since 2008 she is a researcher at Art Institute of the National Academy of Sciences of Armenia, since 2006 she is a lecturer of Foreign Theatre and Dramaturgy at the Yerevan State Institute of Theatre and Cinema. Since May 2019, along with literary critic Ani Pashayan, Anush Aslibekyan authored and runs the "Two in Search of an Author" program on "Noah's Arch" channel, dedicated to contemporary literature and art.

== Festivals and stage performances ==
- "Mercedes" play, was performed at Yerevan State Youth Theatre, 2015, Yerevan, National Theater Prize "Artavazd" for Best Original Music (Vahan Artsruni) for performance and Best Young Actress, 2016
- "Komitas: The Blessing Light" play, was performed in Saint Petersburg-2015
- "It’s about You" based on the stories from "Welcome to My Fairy-Tale", was performed on the small stage of Yerevan State Puppet Theater - 2014 Armenian Art-Fest Prize as Best performance (bronze medal)
- "Flight over the city’’ play, was performed at Puppet theater-2010, Yerevan, National Theater Prize "Artavazd" for Best stenography for performance, 2011

== Awards ==
- YEREVAN BOOK FEST - 2017
- The best Writer of the Year Armenian internet competicion - 2013
- Best Editor Prize, Contest of Student Magazines "Medicus Days" – 2003
- The Best Diploma Work, Yerevan State Institute of Theatre and Cinema – 2003
- The Best Young Writer, Yerevan State Institute of Theatre and Cinematography – 1999

== Publication ==
- "Welcome to my fairy tell’’ book of stories and one play, "Graber" publishing house, Yerevan-2009
- "From Moyra’s Diary" book of stories and one play, "Apolon" publishing house, Yerevan-2014
- Dozen of publication in republican, scientific and literary media – 1999–present
- "Flight over the City", Plays, "Armav" publishing, 2018, 119p.
- "Professor", Novella, "Armav" publishing, 2019, 43 p.
- Anush Aslibekyan, Andriej Moskwin - ARMENIAN PERFORMING ARTS. HISTORY AND PRESENT, Warszawa-2026, 194 p․
