= Yevprime Avedisian =

Armenian prosaist, poet

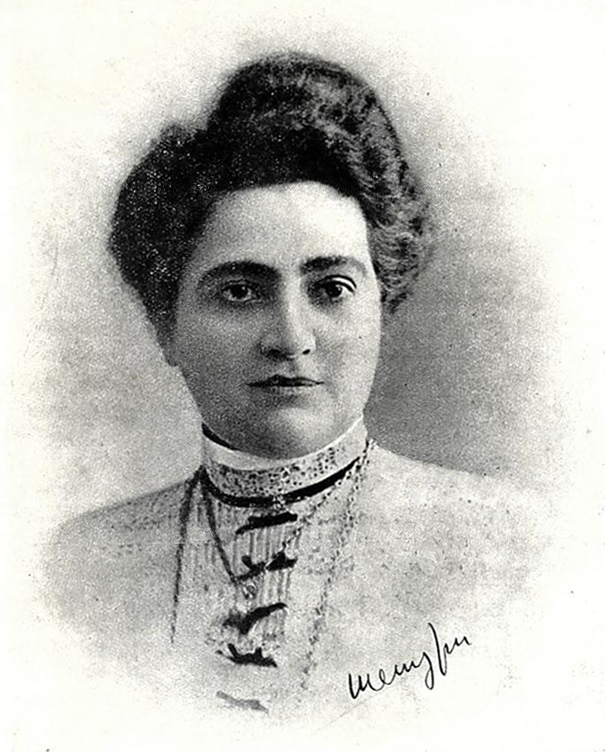
Portrait of Yevprime Avedisian

Yevprime Avedisian (Armenian: Եւփրիմէ Աւետիսեան, 1872–1950), also known by her pen name Annais, Anais or Anayis, was an Armenian poet and short story writer. Writing poems about the female body and sexual desire, she contributed to literary journals in Istanbul and Paris. She is remembered in particular for her autobiography Յուշերս (My Recollections), Paris, 1949. She participated in salons in the Ottoman Empire as they allowed women to mix with men without being considered disreputable.

Avedisian's date of birth has not been firmly established. The years 1863 and 1872 are the most probable. In his 1973 Biographical Dictionary (Կենսագրական բառարան), G. Stepanyan gives it as 1872.

Born in Constantinople, Yevprime Hagop Avedisian was a member of the Chopanyan family from Kemaliye in Eastern Anatolia. After studying at the Armenian Makruhyats School, she attended the Fourier School in order to improve her French and took private lessons in Armenian from the poets Tovmas Terzian and Khoren Nar Pey. Her poetry was first published in the Armenian revue Massis in 1893. She went on to contribute both prose and verse to various periodicals. As a result of the Hamidian massacres at the end of the 19th century, she spent a period in Switzerland but returned to Constantinople after the Ottoman Constitution in 1908, contributing to various journals.

In 1922, she moved to Paris where she spent the rest of her life. She continued to write for French Armenian literary revues such as Anahit (Անահիտ). A collection of her poems was published in 1942 as Այգ և վերջալույս (Sunrise and Sunset) and her memoires appeared in 1949.

Yevprime Avedisian died in Paris on 4 August 1950.
