= Manvel Zulalyan =

Manvel Karapeti Zulalyan (Armenian: Մանվել Զուլալյան; December 30, 1929, Aleppo, Syria - January 19, 2012, Yerevan, Armenia) was an Armenian historian, Armenologist, an academic of Armenian Academy of Sciences, member of Presidium. Doctor of History, Professor of the Armenian State Pedagogical University, specialist on Oriental studies.

He was one of co-authors of "History of Armenia" multi-volume research.

== Books ==
- Voprosy drevneĭ i srednevekovoĭ istorii Armenii. by Manvel Karapeti Zulalyan - Institute of History - 1970 - 148 pages
