= Tanburi Arutin =

18th-century Ottoman Armenian musician and traveler

Tanburi Arutin (Armenian: Հարութին Թամբուրի, Turkish: Tanburi Küçük Arutin Efendi) was an 18th-century Ottoman Armenian musician and traveler who visited Afshar Iran under Nader Shah.

He refers to himself in the text as the "little tanbur player Arutin" (Turkish: Tanburî Küçük Arutin), however "little" here might mean second of his name (as carrying the name of his grandfather). Arutin was an Ottoman Armenian musician, most likely active during the first half of the 18th century. In addition to Armenian, was a native speaker of Turkish, probably based in Istanbul. He was one of the earliest documented users of Armeno-Turkish alphabet.

In 1736, Arutin participated in the Ottoman delegation to Iran, led by Mirahor Mustafa Paşa, and although Arutin was not an official envoy or bureaucrat, he travelled with the delegation, in the capacity of court musician. During this time, he authored a travelogue of his experiences. Unlike conventional sefaretnâmes authored by Ottoman diplomats, Arutin's narrative is informal, unsanctioned, and rich in personal detail. After the embassy's formal conclusion, Arutin remained in Iran, travelling with Nader Shah's army as far as Kabul, Lahore, and Delhi, and witnessing the rise and eventual coronation of the Afsharid ruler. His text offers granular, first-hand accounts of court intrigue, battlefield encounters, and everyday camp life—remarkably free from the ceremonial constraints of state-authored narratives. He also reported on failure of one of Nader Shah's Armenian colony project in Khorasan. His travelogue was printed in Venice in 1800 under the title History of Tahmaz Ghuli (Armenian: Պատմութիւն Թահմազ Ղուլի, romanized: Patmutʻiwn Tʻahmaz Ġuli) with Armeno-Turkish alphabet, published through the efforts of the Mekhitarist Congregation of San Lazzaro.

Arutin was the author of a lost music treatise that was rediscovered and brought to scholarly attention by Armenian musicologist Nikoghos Tahmizian. The text, titled Manual of Oriental Music (Armenian: Ձեռնարկ արևելյան երաժշտության, romanized: Jeṙnark arewelyan eražštutʻyan) is one of the earliest known Turkish-language music manuals, composed in the Armenian script. According to Tahmizyan, the treatise represents a critical moment in the formalisation of Eastern musical theory, bridging oral tradition and systematic notation. The Manual includes: over 100 modal phrases drawn from the Iranian and broader Near Eastern modal tradition, descriptions of modal structures (ladic-tonal frameworks) and their melodic contours, discussions of intonation, improvisation, and performance technique and notational systems based on ligatures and symbolic rhythmic signs.

== Sources ==
- Arutin, Tanburi (1968). Руководство по Восточной музыке [Manual of Oriental Music] (in Russian). Translated by Tahmizian, Nikoghos. Publishing House of the Academy of Sciences of the Armenian SSR.
