= Albert Nalchajyan =

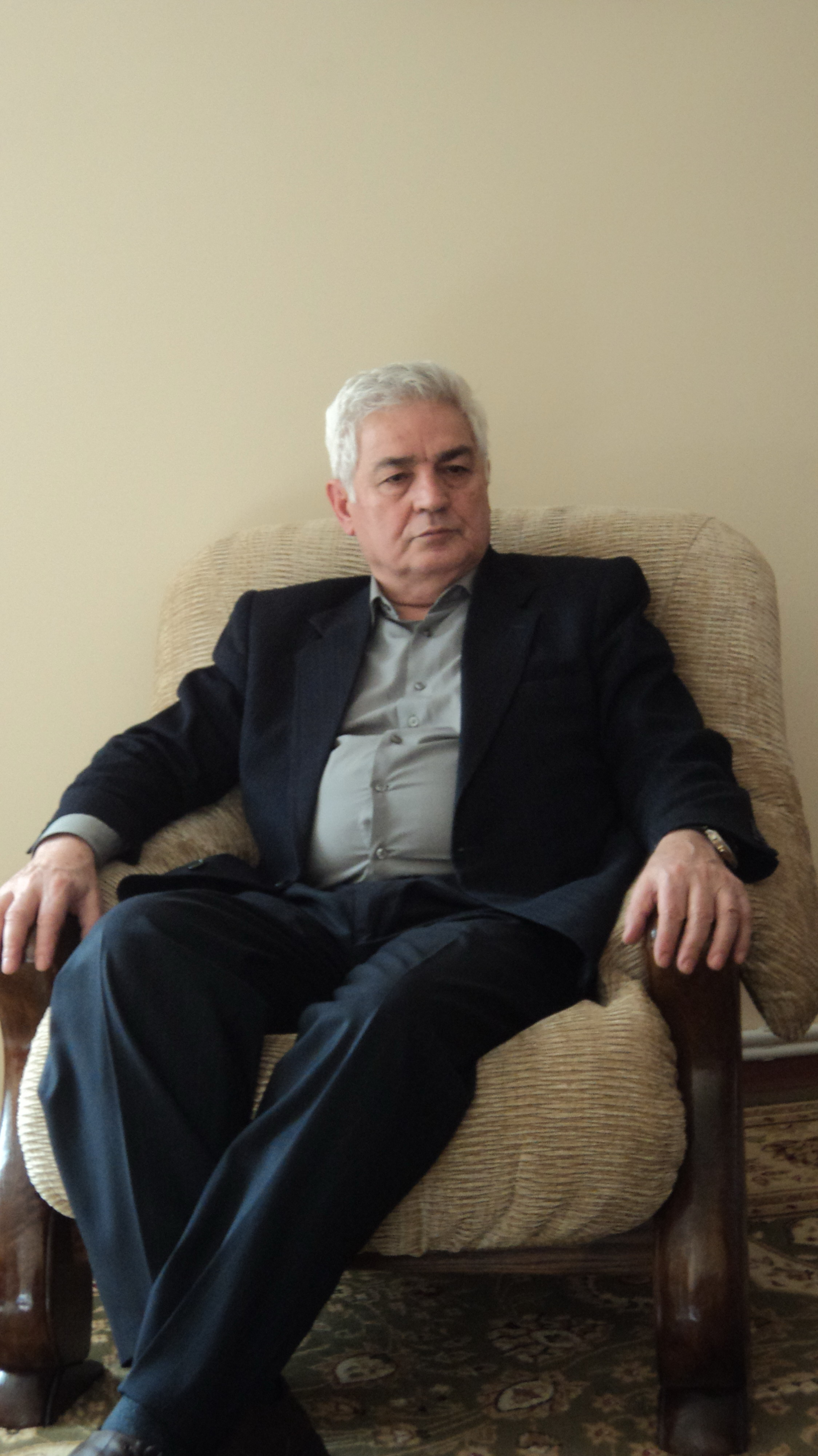
Albert Nalchajyan in 2010

Albert Nalchajyan (born August 22, 1939 in Gyumri (Leninakan), Armenia) is an Armenian psychologist. Spheres of his scientific interests include Psychology, Ethnology and Philosophy.

== Biography ==
Albert Nalchajyan was born on August 22, 1939, in Leninakan (now Gyumri), as a second child of the family. His father Aghabek S. Nalchajyan was a teacher of Russian Language and Geography, his mother Arusyak H. Nalchajyan got a secondary education, she mainly engaged herself in the education of her children.

After leaving the secondary school, Albert Nalchajyan enters the mechanico–mathematic faculty of the Yerevan State University, best however, shows greater and greater interest to the humanitarian sciences. After graduating from the University, for a period of 2 years he works as an engineer, but in 1964 he enters the post – graduate studentship on psychology of the Yerevan State Pedagogical University after Kh. Abovian and all his further life connects with psychology. From 1968 to 1981, he worked in the Institute of Foreign Languages after the name of V. Brussov (Yerevan) as a lecturer of psychology, then as assistant professor and as a Head of the Department of Psychology. From 1974 to 1976 he was the President of the Armenian Psychological Society. From 1981 to 1996 A. Nalchajyan worked in the Institute of Philosophy and Law of the Academy of Sciences of Armenia as the Head of the Department of Psychology. From 1996 to 1997 was the Fellow of Fulbright in the Fordham University (New York, USA). After returning to Armenia he founded a Research Center of Psychology and at present is the Head of this Center.

The main spheres of his scientific interests are:

- Psychology of Personality
- Creative Psychology
- Social Psychology
- Ethnic Psychology
- General Psychology, etc.

In his numerous works has brought forth a number of scientific hypothesis and theories, the main of which are the following:

- Conception of the psychological mechanisms of intuition;
- The theory of personality adaptation in problematic situations;
- The theory of the structure of mind and levels of psychological dynamics;
- The theory of ethnic self-defense;
- Conception of transformation of interethnic aggression in intraethnic aggression;
- Some new conceptions about human aggressivity;
- Psychological theory of victimology and ethnocide;
- Some conceptions about the psychological aspects of ethnogenesis;
- The theory of Fatalism.

Albert Nalchajyan is the author of four university textbooks and three textbooks of psychology for secondary school of Armenia. About 30 years he worked as a lecturer of psychology in several universities of Armenia. At present he is involved in research works in psychology. Albert Nalchajyan is a member of several international scientific organizations. Is married and is a father of three children.

== Books ==
=== In Russian ===
1. Psychological and philosophical problems of intuitive cognition. Moscow: «Misl», 1972, 271 p. (in German: Berlin, Academie Verlag, 1975; in Polish: Warszawa: Publ. Institute, 1979; in Persian: Ispahan Univ. Press, 2007);
2. Personality, psychological adjustment and creativity. Yerevan, "Louys" Publ. House, 1980, 264 p.
3. Social – psychological adjustment of personality: forms, mechanisms and strategies. Yerevan, Publ. House of the Academy of Sciences of Armenia, 1988, 263 p.
4. Ethnopsychological self-defence and aggression. Yerevan, "Hogeban" Publ. House, 2000, 408 p.
5. Ethnic characterology. Yerevan, "Hogeban" and "Zangak" Publ. Houses, 2001, 448 p.
6. Ethnic Pedagogics (Psychological approach). Yerevan: «Zangak», 2003, 312 p. (With S. Mkrtichyan).
7. Ethnopsychology. St-Petersbourgh, Moscow: «Piter», 2004, 381 p.
8. The Enigma of Death. Moscow, St-Petersbourgh: «Piter», 2004, 224 p.
9. Night Life. Personality in his Dreams. St-Petersbourgh, Moscow, 2004, 443 p.
10. Ethnogenesis and Assimilation. Psychological Aspects. Moscow: «Cogito-Centre», 2004, 216 p.
11. Attribution, Dissonance and Social Cognition. Moscow: «Cogito-Centre», 2006, 415 p.
12. Aggressivity of Man. Moscow, St-Petersbourgh: «Piter», 2007, 736 p.
13. Psychological Adaptation. Mechanisms and Strategies. Moscow: «EKSMO», 2010, 368 p
14. Ethnic victimology and the psychohistory of ethnocide. Yerevan,2011, 422.
15. Psyche, conscious, self-conscious. Erevan, 2011, 518 p.
16. Frustration, psychological stress and character. Tome 1, Yerevan, 2013, 217 p.; Tome 2, Yerevan 2013, 506 p.

=== In Armenian ===
1. Intuition in the process of scientific creation. Yerevan: "Hayastan" Publishers, 1976, 324 p.
2. Motive, Conflict and Frustration. Yerevan: «Hayastan», 1978 (with M. Mkrtichyan).
3. Personality, group socialization and psychological adjustment. Yerevan: Academy of Sciences of Armenia, 1985, 265 p.
4. Vocabulary of Psychology. Yerevan: "Louys" Publishers, 1984, 240 p.
5. Death and Dying Psychology. Yerevan: "Punik" Publishers, 1992, 124 p.
6. Foundations of Psychology. Yerevan: "Hogeban" Publishers, 1997, XVII + 648
7. Night Life (Personality in his Dreams). Yerevan: "Zangak" Publishers, 2000, 496 p.
8. Ethnic Psychology. Yerevan: "Hogeban" and "Zangak" Publishers, 2001, 544 p.
9. Social Psychology. Yerevan: "Zangak" Publishers, 2004, 432 p.
