= Voskan Martikian =

Ottoman politician (1867–1947)

- Born: 1867; Erzincan, Ottoman Empire
- Died: 1947 (aged 79–80)
- Occupations: politician, writer, and editor

Voskan Martikian (Armenian: Ոսկան Մարտիկյան; 1867 in Erzincan, Ottoman Empire – 1947) was an Ottoman politician, writer, and editor of Armenian descent.

== Life ==
Voskan Martikian was born in Erzincan to Armenian parents. At a young age, he moved to Istanbul to receive higher learning.

After receiving his education, he rose through the Ottoman ranks of government and held numerous posts in the Ottoman government. After the governmental elections of the Ottoman parliament, he was elected as member of parliament.

Nationalist editor Hüseyin Cahit Yalçın of the newspaper Tanin slandered Martikian claiming that he had drafted the new Ottoman banknotes to an Armenian and that cryptic Armenian codes were contained in its print. An Ottoman commission investigated the accusations and rebuffed the slanders against Martikian. However, his reputation was severely damaged as a trustworthy politician amongst the Young Turks. At the start of the First World War in 1914, when the Ottoman Parliament was debating whether it should join the war, Martikian made no secret of his disapproval of entry. This created a further rift between the Ottoman authorities and himself. Under much pressure, he resigned from his seat in the parliament.

He was also a strong supporter of the Armenian community as a member of the National Political Assembly in Istanbul. He was active in numerous literary and social undertakings.
