= Ruben Mirzakhanyan =

Armenian politician (born 1959)

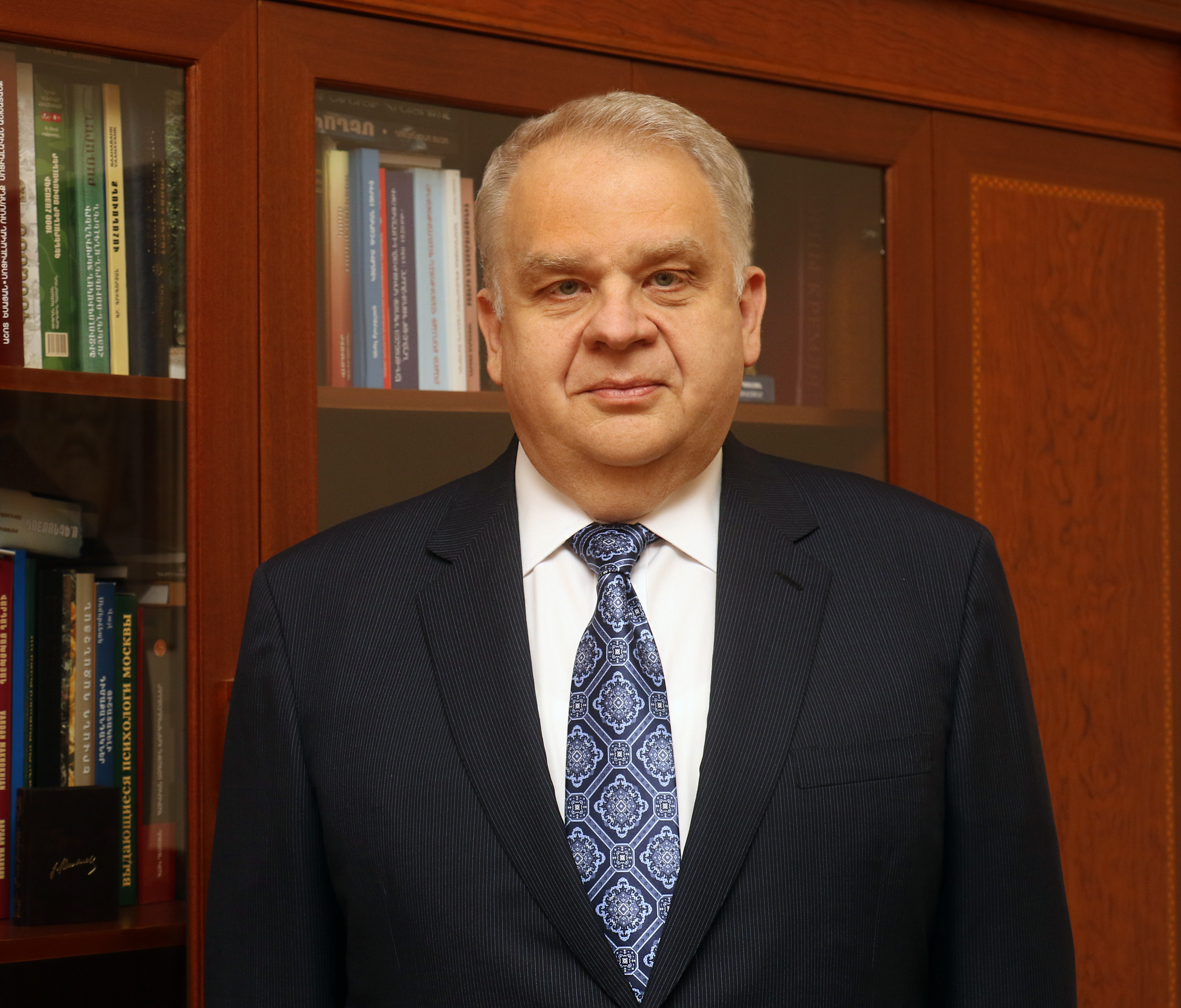
- Picture of Ruben Mirzakhanyan
- Born: 1959 (age 66–67); Yerevan, Armenia
- Scientific career
- Institutions: Armenian State Pedagogical University - Rector (2011)

Ruben Mirzakhanyan (Armenian: Ռուբեն Միրզախանյան) is an Armenian political and educational figure, editor, Doctor of History, professor, RA Honoured Cultural Figure, and Rector of the Armenian State Pedagogical University after Khachatur Abovyan.

== Biography ==
Ruben Mirzakhanyan was born in Yerevan in 1959. He studied at Yerevan secondary school N114 and at the Yerevan State University, Faculty of History. He received qualification of Historian. In 1980, he worked at Yerevan Technical College N17 as a Training-Production master and lecturer of Politology and Economics. Since 1981, he has been developing academic – pedagogical activities at the Armenian State Pedagogical University after Khachatur Abovyan. In 1985 he defended his Candidate's Thesis and received the title of Associate Professor. In 1990 he was elected, and in 2000 and 2006 re-elected as the Dean of the Faculty of Culture of the Pedagogical University; he held that position until September 2010. In September 2010 he was appointed as the acting Rector of the Armenian State Pedagogical University after Khachatur Abovyan. On 24 February 2011 he was unanimously elected as the Rector of the Armenian State Pedagogical University after Khachatur Abovyan. In 2016 he was re-elected as Rector He gives lectures on "History of Armenian Culture". He is the author of six books, more than fifty academic and around seventy public articles; he participated in numerous international, political and academic conferences. He is the President of the Editing Boards of the Problems of Pedagogy and Psychology, the ASPU Academic Yearbook, Armenian Studies Journal, Special Education Issues, Wisdom, and Russian Language in Armenia.

== Political activity ==
Ruben Mirzakhanyan was one of the founders of the Armenian "Ramkavar Azatakan" (Liberal Democratic) Party, was elected as the President of the founding board of the ARAP, and from December 1991 till July 1996 was the Chairman of the ARAP Administrative Unit. In 1999, he was re-elected as the Chairman of the ARAP Republican Unit, was the member of the Political Council under the President. From December 2001 till July 2003 he assumed the responsibility of the Chairman of the ARAP. Since July 2003 he has been the President of the Central Department of the Teckeyan Cultural Union of Armenia. He is the founder and member of the editing board of the World Armenian Congress, Azg newspaper, Payqar magazine, History and Social Sciences yearbook. He is the member of the Teckeyan Centre fund board. In 1995 and 1999 he was elected as the Deputy of the National Ecclesiastical Assembly.

== Awards and titles ==
- 2009 – Saint Sahak – Saint Mesrop medals of Armenian Apostolic Church
- Honoured Culture Figure of Armenia (2009).

== Publications ==
- Refuge /articles, speeches, interviews/. Yerevan, 2001.
- Source Criticism of History of Cultural Life of Armenia and its History from 1953, Yerevan, 2008.
- Cultural Life in Armenia from 1956 to 1966. Historical Analysis, Yerevan, 2008.
- Soviet Armenian Culture. 1956–1990, Yerevan, 2009.
- Armenian Culture in the first half of 60s / historical analytical notes, Moscow, 2008.
- Social Realism and Soviet Armenian Fine Arts (co-author H.Hakobyan), Yerevan, 2014.
- Social Realism in Soviet Armenian Fine Arts (co-author H. Hakopyan), Moscow, 2015.
- Impressionism, Painting Armenians, Yerevan, 2016.
- Socialist Realism and Fine Arts in Soviet Armenia, Yerevan, 2017.
- The Educational and Cultural Life in Soviet Armenia Between 1920 and 1932, Yerevan, 2018.
- Impressionism, Painting Armenians, Yerevan, 2019.
