= Vahe Berberian =

- Վահէ Պէրպէրեան
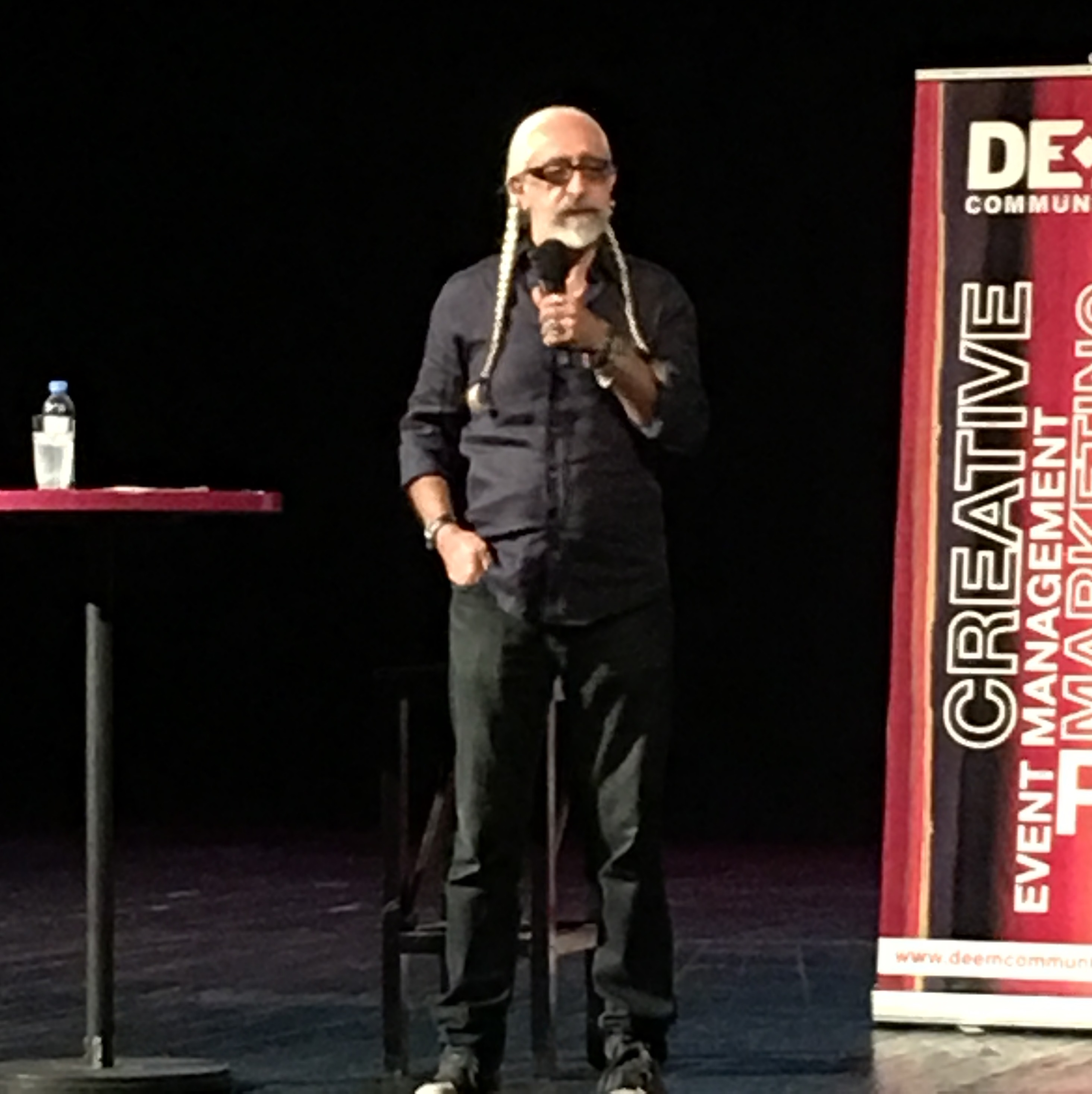
- Born: 11 July 1955 (age 70); Beirut, Lebanon
- Known for: Playwright, novelist, monologist, artist, director, actor, and comedian.
- Spouse: Betty Berberian

Vahe Berberian (Armenian: Վահէ Պէրպէրեան; born July 11, 1955) is an Armenian playwright, novelist, monologist, artist, director, actor, and comedian. Though best known for his comedic monologues, Berberian has written several novels and has showcased his artwork throughout the world. As the author of several plays, his works have been translated into different languages and staged in various cities worldwide. He currently resides in Los Angeles, California.

== Life ==
Vahe Berberian was born in Beirut, Lebanon 11 July 1955 to Armenian parents who were survivors of the Armenian genocide. Vahe's father Raffi Berberian, who was from Eğin (today's Kemaliye), was deported along with his mother to Deir ez-Zor in the Syrian desert when he one year's old. Vahe's mother, who was born in Beirut but whose family was from Arapkir, had most of her family killed. Vahe's paternal family settled in Aleppo and eventually moved to Beirut where Vahe was born. The Berberian household became a known meeting place for artists and intellectuals. Encouraged by this, Berberian had his start in theatre while living in Beirut and became part of the Experimental Theatre and Theatre 67 theatrical groups in Beirut. Berberian studied Arts under the tutelage of Paul Guiragossian and graduated from the local Levon and Sophia Hagopian College. At the age of 17, he toured Europe and returned to Lebanon. A couple of years after his arrival in Lebanon, the Lebanese Civil War began and Berberian fled Lebanon in 1976 and moved to Canada for a year, eventually settling in the United States in 1977. In Los Angeles, Berberian continued his studies and received a degree in journalism with honors from Woodbury University in 1980.

== Work ==
=== Literary works: Novels, plays, scripts ===
Published in 1996, Berberian's first novel, Letters From Zaatar, has had three editions, and his second novel In the Name of the Father and the Son (1999), originally published in Armenian, was translated into Turkish, English and French. His most recent novel is Diary of a Dead Man (2021) and is published in English.

A founding member of the Armenian Experimental Theatre, Berberian has written, directed, acted, and produced several theatrical productions, including his original scripts: Pink Elephant, Quicksand, Baron Garbis, and Gyank, which have been translated in six different languages and performed in cities all over the world.

Berberian's film career is best known for his co-writing, co-directing, and co-starring of his 2016 feature, Three Weeks in Yerevan.

=== Monologues ===
Best known for his comedic monologues in Armenian, Berberian has written seven of them: Yevaylen, Nayev, Dagaveen, Sagayn, Yete, Ooremn and his most recent, Payts. Berberian exhibits a capacity for dissecting commonplace occurrences, specifically in human relationships and interactions. Using a comedic lens, his analyses appeals to his audiences which encompass both Armenians and the global community. The monologues have garnered a cumulative audience of thousands, with many of his shows on YouTube accumulating 50,000 to 240,000 views.

=== Art ===
After his studies, Vahe Berberian continued his work in the artistic field. He eventually participated in more than 30 individual and group exhibitions throughout the United States, Canada, Europe and the Middle East. Berberian's art has been featured on sets for Hollywood movies, prime time TV shows and commercials, like the Spiderman Trilogy, Crank, and 24. A practitioner of abstract expressionism, Berberian has evolved his artistic style over the years, transitioning towards a minimalistic approach characterized by the deliberate removal of the superfluous. His art embraces the essence of absolute simplicity in expression. The clarity of his visions, marked by minimalistic imagery, letters, and numbers devoid of conventional syntax, mirrors tangible emotions in a raw and candid format.
