= Abgarios =

Abcarius (also Abkariyus, Abgarios) was the surname of an Arab Armenian family of intellectuals.

- Yaqub Abcarius (born Hagop Abcarian (Armenian: Hakob Liustratsi, b. 1781, Aksehir, Turkey; died 1845, Beirut, Lebanon (Syria)) was a bishop and public figure.
- His son, Iskander Abcarius (1826-1885) was an author of poems and historical works. He studied in England, published the "Story of Shahriar Lion-King" epos (1880), "Classification of Arabian poets", "Unusual events in Mountainous Lebanon in 1860" and other books.
- His younger son, Yuhanna (Hovhannes(John)) Abcarius (1832-1886) was a translator at the English embassy in Beirut, wrote stories and novels in Arabic, wrote "Abcarius' English-Arabic Dictionary" (1st edition pub. 1883, 605 pp.) and edited an Armenian-Arabic dictionary (published posthumously in 1887).

== Sources ==
- Armenian Concise Encyclopedia, Ed. by acad. K. Khudaverdian, Yerevan, 1990, Vol. 1, p. 10
