= Verjine Svazlian =

- Armenian: Վերժինե Սվազլյան
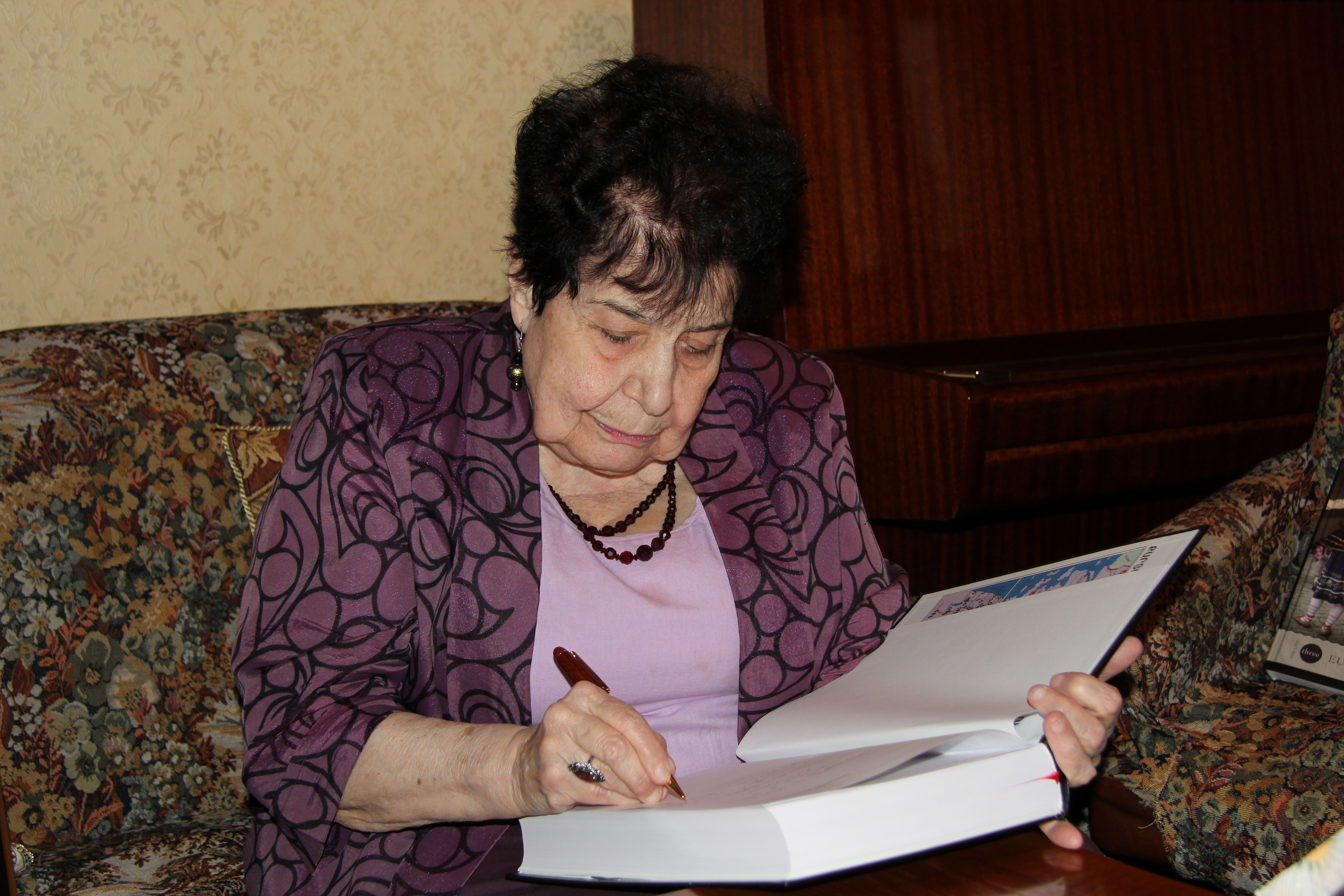
- Born: March 1, 1934; Alexandria, Egypt
- Education: Yerevan Khachatour AbovianArmenian State Pedagogical University
- Awards: Honorary Worker of Science of Armenia
- Scientific career
- Fields: Ethnography; Folklore
- Workplaces: Institute of Archaeology and Ethnography of National Academy of Sciences of Armenia; The Armenian Genocide Museum-institute

Verjine Svazlian (Armenian: Վերժինե Սվազլյան, March 1, 1934) is an Armenian ethnographer and folklorist, historian, genocide scholar, Leading Researcher at the Institute of Archeology and Ethnography of NAS RA, Doctor of Philology, Professor. Honoured Scientists of the Armenia (2016). Svazlian saved from a total loss the various folklore relics communicated, in different dialects, by the Armenians forcibly exiled from Western Armenia, Cilicia and Anatolia to the various countries of the world and finally repatriated to Armenia.

== Biography ==
Verjine Svazlian was born in 1934 in Alexandria in the family of Armenian genocide survivor, writer and public man, Karnik Svazlian. She was involved at Poghossian Armenian National School, where she got her elementary education and at the Armenian Nuns’ Immaculate Conception School with a French language bias for secondary education. In 1947 she was repatriated with her parents to Soviet Armenia. In 1956 Svazlian graduated from the Yerevan Khachatour Abovian Armenian State Pedagogical University Department of the Armenian Language and Literature.

In 1958, Svazlian worked at the Manouk Abeghian Institute of Literature of the Academy of Sciences of Armenia, where she was initially a M. Abeghian grant-aided student (under the scientific leadership of the Academician Karapet Melik-Ohandjanian). Since 1961, Svazlian has been working at the Institute of Archaeology and Ethnography of the National Academy of Sciences of Armenia. Meanwhile, from 1996 to 2004, she also worked at The Armenian Genocide Museum-institute. She has maintained her Candidate thesis in 1965 and her thesis for a Doctor's degree in 1995.

Verjine Svazlian is the author of more than 500 academic and public papers published in Armenia, Diaspora and abroad.

== Membership ==
- Scientific Council of the Museum-Institute of the Armenian Genocide of NAS RA, 1996-2004
- Professional Council of the Institute of Archaeology and Ethnography of NAS RA, 1996

== Awards ==
- 1975 Medal of “USSR Veteran of Labor”
- 1983 “Honor Certificate” of the Presidium of the Academy of Sciences of the Armenian SSR
- 1985 “Gold Medal of Honorable Denizen of Moussa Dagh”
- 1992 “Honorable Denizen of Zeytoun”
- 1999 “Honorable Denizen of Vaspourakan”
- 2003 “Fridtjof Nansen Memorial Medal”
- 2005 “Gold Memorial Medal” of the Cultural Union of the Armenians of Istanbul
- 2005 “Mesrop Mashtots Memorial Medal” (Aleppo (Syria) branch of ABGU awarded her the)
- 2006 The Boghossian Prize
- 2006 “Honorable Denizen of Hadjn”
- 2006 “Nile Key Gold Memorial Medal”
- 2008 The Great Mind of the 21st Century, Title and Medal, US Congressional Institute
- 2009 “Memorial Medal of the First Armenian Printer Hakob Meghapart”
- 2011 David Anhaght Medal, Academy of Armenian Philosophy
- 2013 Medal of Movses Khorenatsi
- 2016 Honorary Worker of Science of Armenia
