= Artashes Kalantarian =

- Արտաշես Քալանթարյան
- Born: September 16, 1931; Yerevan, Soviet Armenia
- Died: February 23, 1991 (aged 59); Yerevan, Armenia
- Occupation(s): writer, publicist, journalist and playwright
- Spouse: Julietta Kalantaryan
- Children: four children
- Website: Artashes Kalantarian

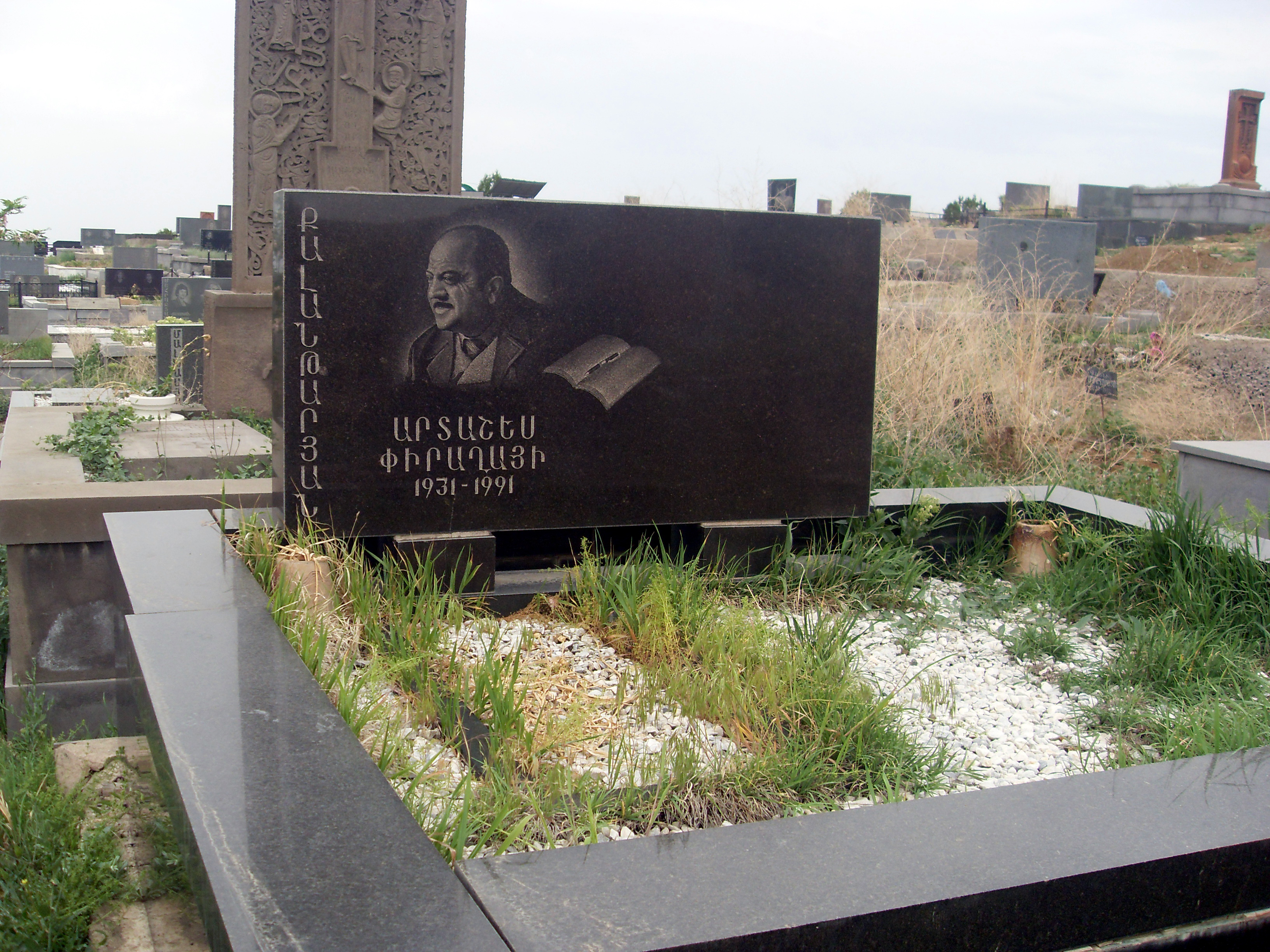

Artashes Piraghayi Kalantarian (Armenian: Արտաշես Փիրաղայի Քալանթարյան, 16 September 1931 – 23 February 1991) was an Armenian writer, publicist, journalist and playwright.

== Biography ==
Artashes Kalantarian was born in Yerevan. He graduated from faculty of philology of the Yerevan State University specializing in journalism, where he used to crack jokes with lecturers. He worked in different positions in Sovatakan Hayastan, Yerekoyan Yerevan, Grakan tert and other periodicals. From 1970 to 1982 he worked at Armenian TV. He created and hosted My home is your home popular TV-program.

He is the author of 15 books and numerous satiric articles and feuilletons, translated into Georgian, Bulgarian and Russian. His novel Marathon was sold out in a few hours in 1969.

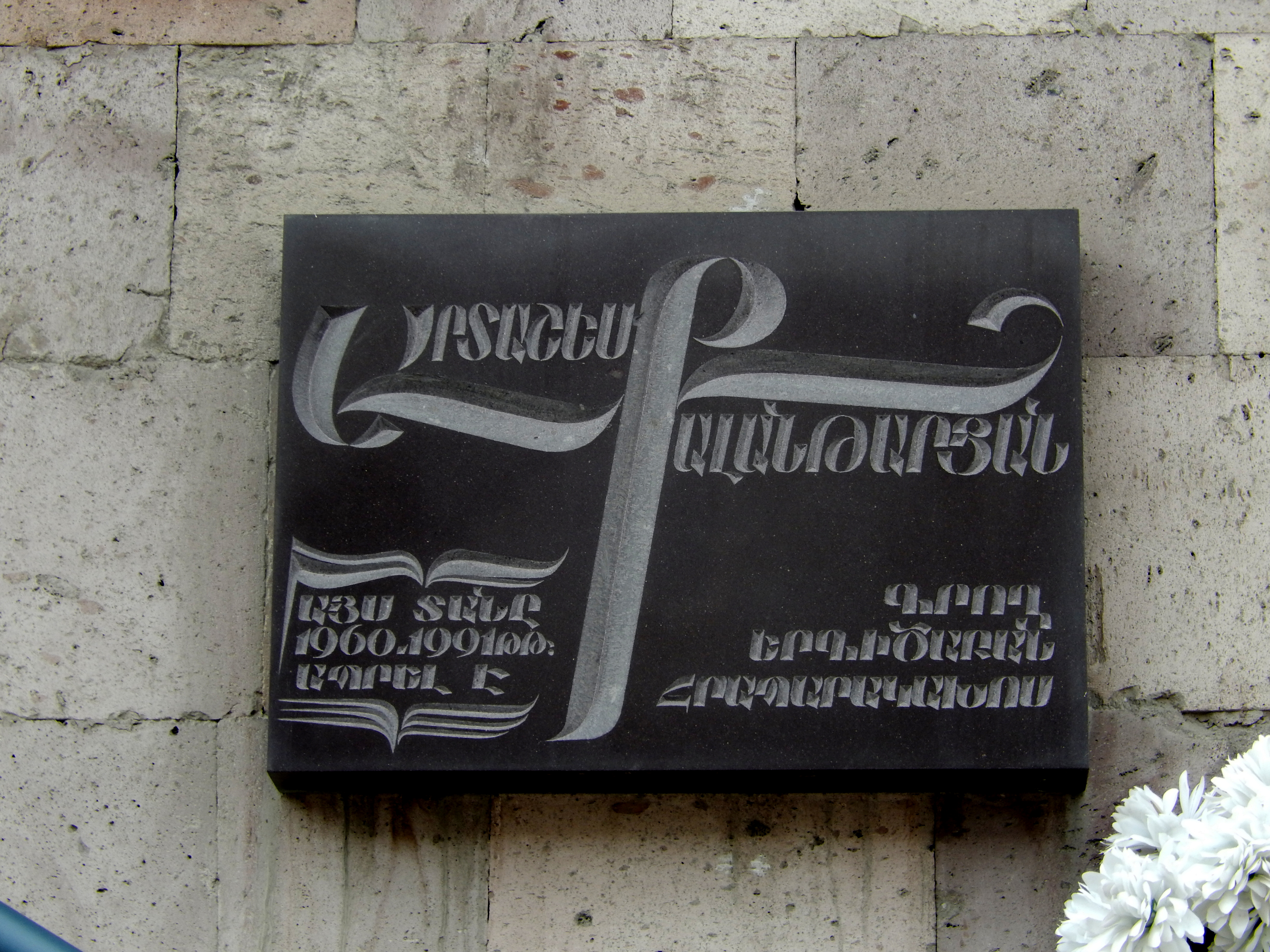
Artashes Kalantarayan's plaque in Yerevan

== Personal life ==
He was married to Julietta Kalantaryan and had four children. He was a kind, tolerant and thoughtful person.
