= Zaruhi Kalemkaryan =

American poet

- Born: Zaruhi Seferian; July 18, 1871; Constantinople, Ottoman Empire
- Died: July 20, 1971 (aged 100); New York, New York, United States
- Occupations: Writer; essayist; poet; philanthropist

Zaruhi Kalemkaryan (Armenian: Զարուհի Գալեմքեարեան; July 18, 1871 or 1874 in Constantinople, Ottoman Empire – July, 1971 in New York, New York) was a prose writer, essayist, poet, and philanthropist of Armenian descent.

== Life ==
Zaruhi Kalemkaryan was born Zaruhi Seferian on the Asiatic side of Constantinople's Bosphorus to Aşod Seferyan and her mother Peruze Demircibaşyan. She attended the local Aramian Armenian School and started her early experiments with poetry at school. She married Mihran Kalemkaryan in 1889, who was a member of the Ottoman Army. She began publishing under the pen names Yevterpe, and after her marriage G. Zaruhi. She contributed to Mari Beylerian's newspaper Artemis. After the Armenian Genocide, she assisted in the relief effort of the genocide survivors, especially children. She also contributed to the Armenian feminist journal Hay Gin. During this time, she published numerous poems in Constantinople and continued in the United States. She settled in New York City and was involved in many philanthropic and charitable foundations for the Armenian community. She was one of the first women members of AGBU (Armenian General Benevolent Union). In 1971, she died at the age of 97.

== Works ==
- Zartonk (The Awakening) – 1893: Poetry
- Tornigis Kirke (My Grandchildren's Book) – 1936: Travel Book
- Gyankis Jampen (My Life's Road) – 1952: Memoir
- Orer yev Temker (Days and Faces) – 1965
