= Pete Najarian (writer) =

American writer (born 1940)

- Born: 1940 (age 85–86); Union City, New Jersey

Peter Najarian (born 1940) is an American novelist, short story, and nonfiction writer. He is also a painter and sculptor, and a cousin of painter Art Pinajian.

== Biography ==
After graduating from Rutgers University in 1958, where he roomed with the poet Robert Pinsky, Najarian was a Social Investigator for the New York City Department of Welfare, where his caseload was in Harlem.

He then lived in London for three years, where he taught English Studies in Kingsway Day College, and Film Study for the Education Department of the British Film Institute.

He returned to the States when he received the Stegner Fellowship at Stanford University for the academic year 1967–1968.

He received an M.A. in creative writing at San Francisco State University in 1970, where he studied with his friend, the novelist Leo Litwak.

He was a Fulbright Lecturer in Soviet Armenia in the academic year 1988–1989. While in Armenia he helped to recover survivors after the earthquake, and the short work called “The Girl” in his collection "The Great American Loneliness" is about his experience there.

He has taught creative writing in San Francisco State University, Wayne State University, Scripps College for Women, University of California at San Diego, University of Hawaii, University of California at Davis, and University of California at Berkeley. He contributed to the Serving House Journal of Literary Arts, and to a compilation titled The Sixties, edited by Peter Stine and published by Wayne State University Press.

He received a Grant for Creative Non-fiction from the National Endowment for the Arts in 2000. His works were cited during a discussion of Armenian American literature at a symposium celebrating the 40th anniversary of the Society for Armenian Studies.

Najarian is also a plein air painter and a sculptor, and his work has been exhibited in the Artist’s Union in Yerevan, Armenia; in the Hearst Gallery at Saint Mary’s College of California; in the Napa Valley Museum in California; and at Berkeley Public Library.

His last four books are illustrated with his drawings and paintings.

== The Paintings of Art Pinajian, A Family Story ==
The Paintings of Art Pinajian, A Family Story, is an illustrated non-fiction novel by Pete Najarian about his cousin, Art Pinajian.

As Najarian tells the story, Pinajian had verbally left his paintings to him but left no written will. His book recounts how these paintings were taken from him after Pinajian's death and later sold to Lawrence E. Joseph, who then hired Peter Hastings Falk to promote them. The book seeks to prove that Pinajian never wanted his work “thrown into the garbage,” as was stated by Falk in his promotional book, Pinajian, Master of Abstraction Discovered, which states, "Pinajian left instructions for his collection to be discarded in the town dump."

Najarian's book also seeks to prove in the course of Pinajian's letters to him that his cousin was in fact a "most sane human being" who was a "popular and attractive and humorous man and who was out-going and socially responsible and whose isolation in his later years was only a result of his poverty."

From Art’s letters to his cousin Pete: "It is between me and myself that I work now…. My work is a reflection of what I want my life to be…. To understand the totality of art is to arrive at its creation…. If you are conscious of Totality, time will coalesce everything into one…. Searching for forms is terrific therapy and makes me feel good and refreshed…. No one notices, of course, except the creator and sometimes not even he.”

Pinajian's art was subsequently valued at $30 million.

== The Naked & The Nude ==
"Pete Najarian writes prose in the American tradition that includes Thomas Wolfe, William Saroyan, and Jack Kerouac. The Naked & The Nude is the seventh volume in his autobiographical narrative that works the territory between lyrical autobiography and the novel to tell his story and the story of his generation. Najarian’s subject—like Wolfe’s Saroyans, Kerouac’s—is the male artist and the way in which a mix of sexual hunger and literary ambition, the hunger for a home and a belief in the transformative power of art, become both a wound and a way in the world. In Najarian’s - case this story has its ground in Armenia, the story of the early twentieth century genocide, an immigrant life in America, and a fierce current of damage and love that works its way through the generations. As for art—it also matters that Najarian is a painter which makes The Naked & The Nude as much a book about seeing and making as it is a book about sexuality.

== Bibliography ==
- Voyages, a novel, published by Pantheon Books, 1971
- "Wash Me On Home, Mama," a novel, published by Berkeley Poets Co-op, 1978
- "Daughters of Memory," a novel, published by City Miner, 1986
- "The Great American Loneliness," a collection, published by Blue Crane Books, 1998
- "The Artist and His Mother," a non-fiction novel, published by The Press at California State University, Fresno
- "The Paintings of Art Pinajian, A Family Story," a non-fiction novel published by Regent Press, 2015
- "The Naked & The Nude," a non-fiction novel published by Regent Press, 2017
