= George Goyan =

Armenian historian (born 1901)

George Goyan (born Gevorg OvsepovichTer Nikogosyan, Armenian: Գևորգ Հովսեփի Գոյան born November 10, 1901 – date of death unknown) was a Doctor of Theater Studies and Art History (1949), and a Meritorious Artist Armenian SSR (1961).

He was born in Tiflis. In 1944 he took part in the Yerevan State Institute of Theatre and Cinematography, then taught there until 1949. He is the author of several works on the history of theater, the most significant of which are those on the history of Russian theatre in the seventeenth century, such as "2000 years of Armenian Theatre" (1952).
