= Artem Harutyunyan =

Armenian writer (born 1945)

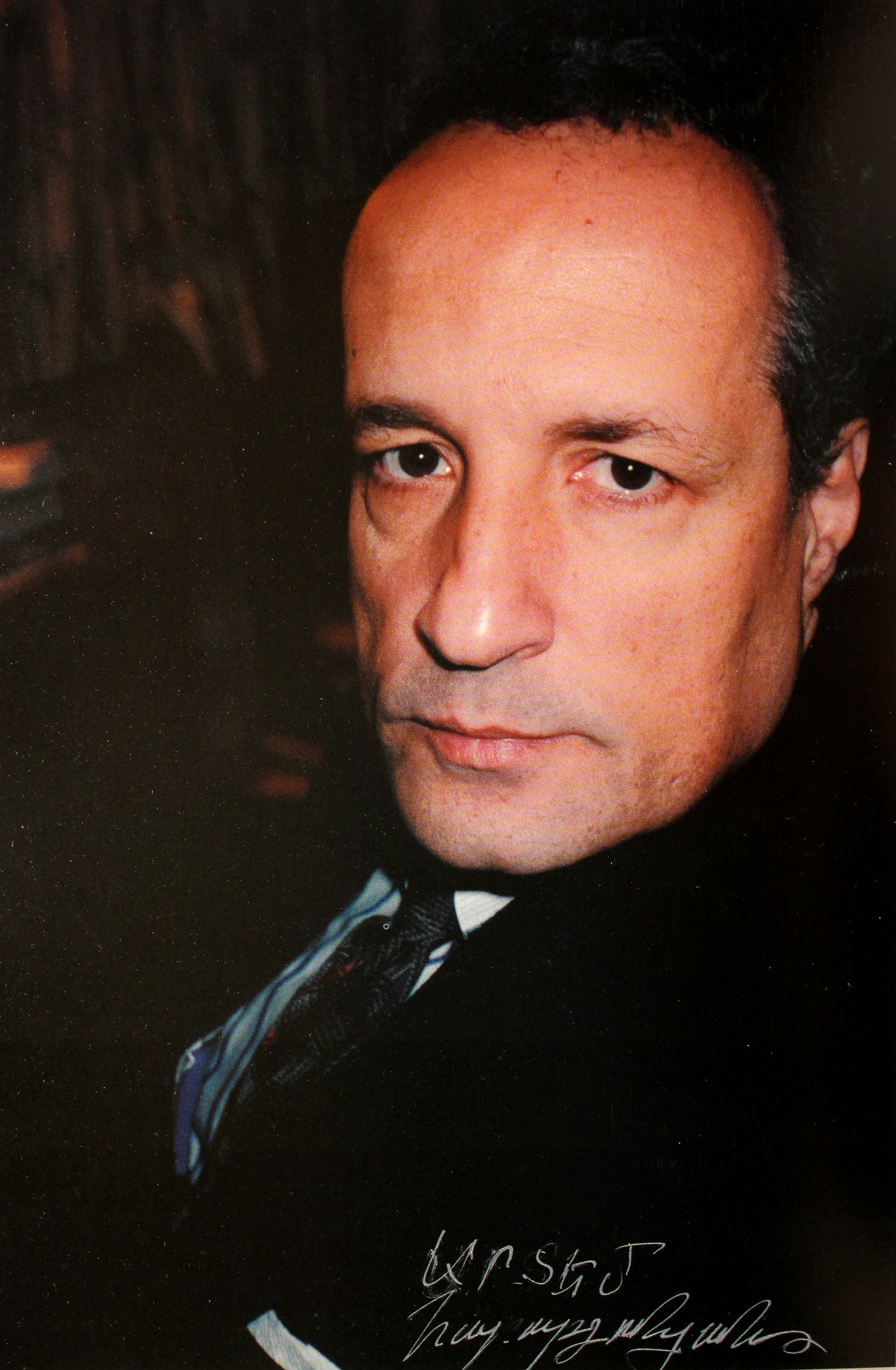
- Born: September 19, 1945 (age 79); Stepanakert
- Occupation(s): Writer, translator, critic

Artem Harutyunyan (Armenian: Արտեմ Հարությունյան, born September 19, 1945, in Stepanakert) is an Armenian writer, translator, critic, Doctor of Philology, Professor, member of Writers Union of Armenia,

== Biography ==
Artem Harutyunyan was born in Stepanakert, the capital of Nagorno-Karabakh, in 1945. After graduating from Yerevan State University, he earned his PhD in American and English Literature from Moscow's Maxsim Gorky Institute of World Literature, Professor (1991).

Harutyunyan has served as NKR representative to Washington in 1994–1995.

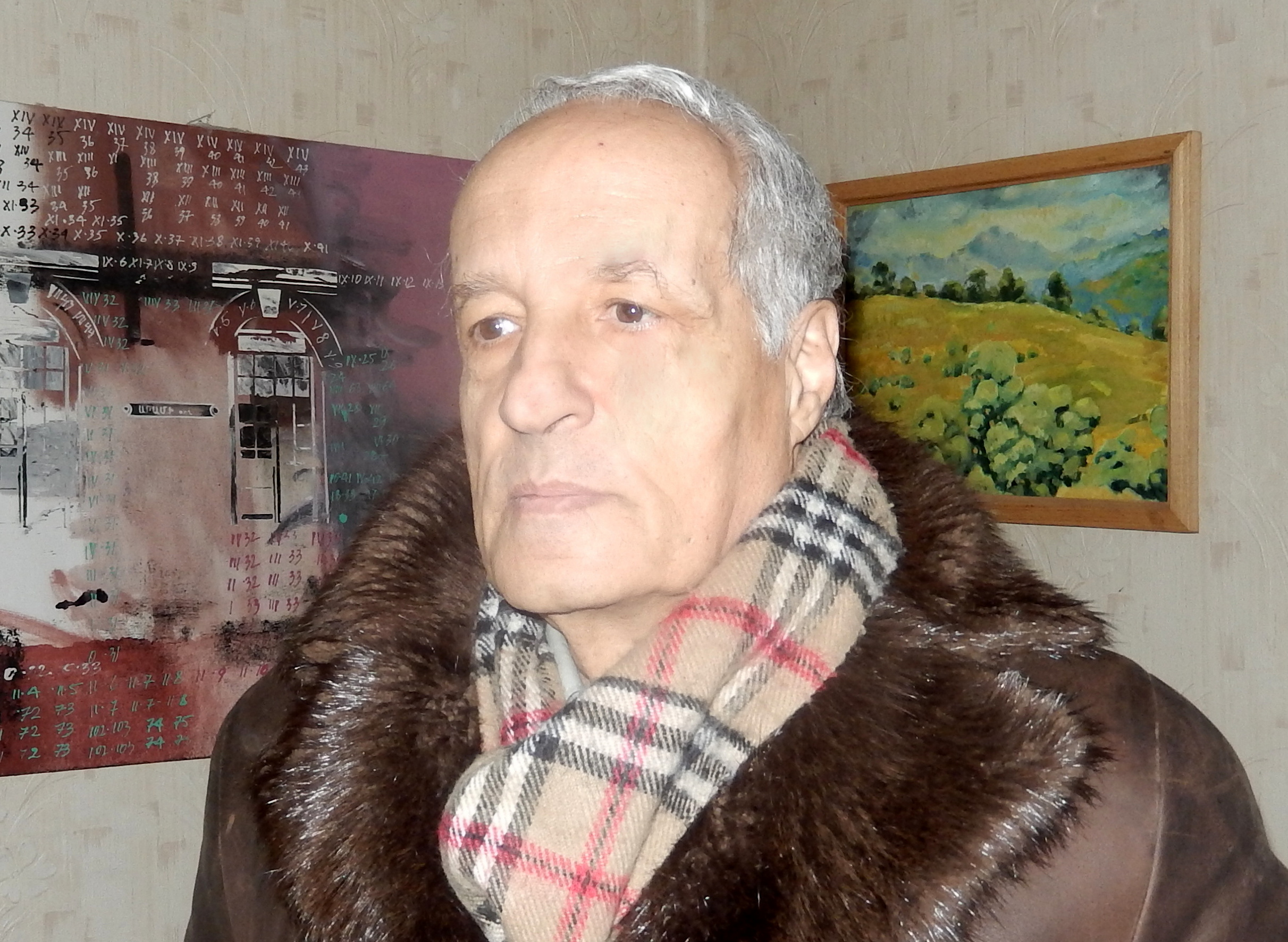

Harutyunyan is the author of nine books of poetry: Land of signs (1977), which was awarded Armenia's "Best Book of the Year", Vista (1979), translated into Russian and awarded Russia's Maxsim Gorkiy Award, Threshold (1984), and Words of Presence (1988). He is also the recipient of France's Rene Char Award, and the V. Tekeyan as well as H. Ouzounyan literary awards for his Conflagration of an Ancient Land, published in the United States in 1994. Letter to Noeh and Other Poems (New York City, 1994) is his first book in English.

Harutyunyan has lectured at the universities of Moscow, the Sorbonne, Montpellier, Paul Valéry, Darham and Cleveland State University. He is Professor of Foreign Literature and Literary Criticism at Yerevan State University, and is a Fulbright Scholar for 1994, at Colgate University, he is also second term Fulbright Professor for 2001, at USLA (Los Angeles).

His two other important books of poetry in Armenian are Letter to Noah and other poems (Yerevan, 1997), and in 2003, the honorary title of winner of state prize of the Republic of Armenia was granted to Artem Harutyunyan for his book Juda's vocation (Yerevan, 2003).

== Translations ==
Harutyunyan is also prolific translator and critic, who have translated from English, French and Russian. Among his Armenian translations are James Joyce's Dubliners (Yerevan, 1983), and an anthology of British and American poetry of twentieth century: Selections from American and British poets, which is part poetry anthology, part critical treatise (Yerevan, 2000). His Armenian translations also include Peter Balakian's novel Black Dog of Fate (2002, Yerevan), and his poetry collection Sad days of light (2008, Yerevan). His critical works include A History of the English Novel (Yerevan, 1992) and The Main Trends of Development in Postwar American Poetry: 1945–1980 (Yerevan, 1986), which was the first doctoral thesis in the former USSR on contemporary American poetry.

== Awards ==
- Stambul International Festival Prize, 2010
- Stockholm International Festival Prize, 2008
- Laureate of Armenia's state award, 2003 (for the book "Juda's Holiday")
- Rene Sharie Prize, 1989
- Maxim Gorki Prize, 1983
- Dilan Ttmas Prize, 1983
