= Arandzar =

Armenian writer

Arandzar Առանձար
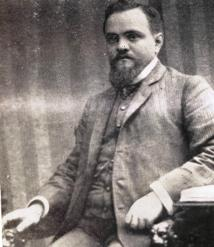
- Born: Missak Kouyumjian; 8 September 1877; Caesarea, Ankara Vilayet, Ottoman Empire
- Died: 13 September 1913 (aged 36); Adana, Ottoman Turkey
- Occupations: Short story writer and principal.

Missak Kouyumjian (Armenian: Միսաք Գույումճյան; September 8, 1877 Caesarea, Ankara Vilayet, Ottoman Empire - September 13, 1913 Adana, Ottoman Turkey), better known by his pen name Arandzar (Armenian: Առանձար), was an Armenian short story writer, poet, and principal.
