= Edward Haghverdian =

Iranian-Armenian poet

- ادوارد حق‌وردیان; Էդուարդ հաղվերդյան
- Born: 1952 (age 73–74); Tehran, Iran
- Citizenship: Armenia, Iran
- Occupations: poet, translator and journalist
- Writing career
- Language: Persian and Armenian

Edward Haghverdian (Persian: ادوارد حق‌وردیان; pronounced [edˈvɒːrd hæɣˈveɾˈdiːjɒːn]; Armenian: Էդուարդ հաղվերդյան) is an Iranian-Armenian poet, translator and journalist who is a member of the Writers Union of Armenia. Since 1970, Haghverdian has been living in Armenia and since 1980s, he spent most of his time translating contemporary Persian literary works into Armenian language.

== Life ==
Edward Haghvedian was born in 1952 in Tehran, Iran to Iranian-Armenian parents. His family originally came from the Iranian city of Khomein in Markazi province of Iran. He finished his elementary education in "National School of Aras" and his high school education, in the Persian-language schools called «Farokh-Manesh», «Paydar» and «Oloum». Thereafter in 1970, he migrated with his family from his birthplace's country Iran to Armenia and settled in the city of Vagharshapat.

== Literary activities ==
=== Translation ===
Since 1980s, Haghverdian spent most of his time translating contemporary Persian literary works into Armenian language. He is the first person who translated the vast majority of modern Iranian literary works into Armenian and published them in Armenia and United States of America.

== See also ==
- Armenian literature
- Persian literature
