= Artur Ustian =

Russian - Armenian political scientist

Artur Rustamovich Ustian (Armenian: Արթուր Ռուստամի Ուստյան; Russian: Артур Рустамович Устян; born 1973 in Tbilisi) is a Russian - Armenian political scientist. He earned his doctorate in 2002.

Ustian is the dean of the faculty of economics of Moscow Stolypin Regional Humanitarian Institute. His works explore the topic of the development of Russia and the era of neo-Byzantium.

== Books ==
- Неовизантизм как евразийская геополитическая стратегия развития России в XXI веке. - Москва.: Институт Социальных Наук, 2002.
- Политическая концепция неовизантизма. - Москва.: Институт Социальных наук, 2003.
- Политическая философия неовизантизма. - Москва.: Институт Социальных наук, 2005.
- Основополагающие принципы и подходы по созданию Христианской политической системы и Президентской Монархии в России на основе политической философии неовизантизма и христианского социального учения. - Москва, 2007.
- Политическая философия ареввизма. - Москва, 2007.
- Политическая философия русского византизма и ареввизма. - Москва, 2009.
- Византийская политология: теория и практика. - Москва., 2009.
