= Ervand Kogbetliantz =

Armenian-American mathematician

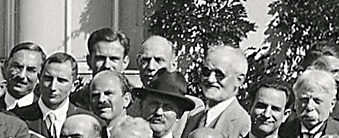
Ervand Kogbetliantz (leftmost) at the International Congress of Mathematicians, Zürich 1932

Kogbetliantz's Signature

Ervand George Kogbetliantz (Armenian: Երվանդ Գևորգի Կողբետլյանց; February 22, 1888, in Rostov-on-the-Don – November 5, 1974 in Paris, France) was a French and American mathematician of Armenian descent (born in Russian Empire) and the first president of the Yerevan State University. He left Russia in 1918. He received a Doctorate in mathematics from the University of Paris in 1923. His mathematical work was mainly on infinite series, on the theory of orthogonal polynomials, on an algorithm for singular value decomposition which bears his name, on algorithms for the evaluation of elementary functions in computers, and the enumeration of prime elements of the Gaussian integers. He also invented a three-dimensional version of chess. He was working at his death with Bobby Fischer on a game of chess for three people. When he first went to America (1941), he taught mathematics at Lehigh University. In the early 1950s, he was a consultant for IBM in New York City and taught at Columbia University. Prior to moving back to Paris and retiring, he was a professor at Rockefeller University.

== Articles and books ==
- Recherches sur la summabilité des séries ultrasphériques par la méthode des moyennes arithmétiques, J. Math. Pures Appl. 9, 107–187, 1924.
- Fundamentals of mathematics from an advanced viewpoint, 4 volumes, Gordon and Breach Science Publishers, 1968.
- (with Alice Krikorian) Handbook of first complex prime numbers, Gordon and Breach Science Publishers, 1971.
