= Yervant Aghaton =

Yervant Aghaton Երվանդ Աղաթոն
- Born: 1860; Constantinople, Ottoman Empire (modern-day Istanbul, Turkey)
- Died: 1935 (aged 95)
- Education: Nubar-Shahnazaryan colleges Robert College Grignon agricultural college
- Occupations: Political activist, agronomist, publisher, and writer.

Yervant Aghaton (Armenian: Երվանդ Աղաթոն; 1860 - 1935), was a prominent Armenian political figure, agronomist, publisher, writer, and one of the founding members of the Armenian General Benevolent Union (AGBU). He was the son of Krikor Aghaton.

== Life ==
Yervant Aghaton was born in Constantinople in Haskoy. He studied first at the local Nersisyan primary school, then Nubar-Shahnazaryan colleges. He then continued his education at the prestigious Robert College. In 1877 he was sent off to Paris to study at the Grignon agricultural college, after graduation, he returned to Constantinople. After the Hamidian Massacres he fled Turkey to continue his university education in Paris. From there he went to Bulgaria and then to Egypt, where in 1920's wrote several books. He wrote "Hayastani Verashinutyune" (Rebuilding Armenia) (1924), "Donations and testament" (1925), "Armenia in a village of farmers exemplar program" (1925), "AGBU birth and history", etc. and in 1931 he published his memoirs.
