= Yervant Pamboukian =

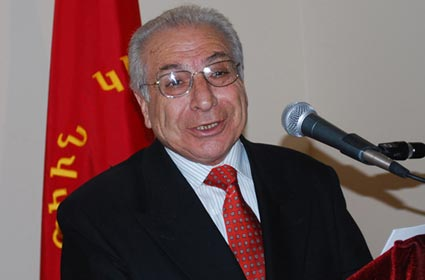
- Born: August 1933 (age 92–93); Aleppo, Syria
- Education: Karen Jeppe Jemaran
- Alma mater: Leuven University
- Occupation: historian

Yervant Pamboukian (Armenian: Երուանդ Փամպուքեան) is an Armenian historian, editor and a member of ARF party.

== Biography ==
Pamboukian was born in Aleppo, Syria in August 1933. He has continued his secondary education in Karen Jeppe Armenian Secondary School in Aleppo till 1953, after which, in 1954, he has continued his education in St. Lazar School of Armenian Studies in Venice. From 1954 to 1958, Pamboukian has studied in the faculty of Social and Political Sciences of the Leuven University of Belgium. Since 1958, he has been Armenian History teacher in Beirut, Lebanon.

=== Works ===
Yervant Pamboukian has taught Armenian History in numerous Armenian schools and institution in Beirut, such as in Jemaran of Hamazkayin (1958-2002), Seminary of Catholicosate of Cilicia (1958-1970), and Souren Khanamirian Armenian School (1965-1970). Along with teaching career, he has been the principal of Aztag Newspaper (1970-1978) and Higher Institution of Armenian Studies of Hamazkayin (1979-2005).

Since 2005, Pamboukian has edited and written Armenian History textbooks and other studies, along with the third and the fourth volumes of "Yerger" of Nikol Aghbalian.

"The History of Armenian Revolutionary Movement and Armenian Revolutionary Federation" of Hratch Dasnabedian and "The Organizing Structure of Armenian Revolutionary Federation" as well as fifth to 12th volumes of "Subjects About ARF History" are his editions.
