= Yervant Gobelyan =

Armenian poet, writer and journalist (1923–2010)

Yervant Gobelyan (Armenian: Երուանդ Կոպէլեան, November 10, 1923 in Istanbul, Turkey - December 15, 2010 in Istanbul, Turkey) was a Turkish poet and writer of Armenian ethnicity.

== Life ==
Yervant Gobelyan was one of four children born to an Armenian family from Izmit Bardizag (Bahçecik). He was born in Rumeli Hisar, a district of Istanbul, in 1923. He received his primary education at Tateosyan School where he graduated in 1937. He continued his studies at the Armenian Esayan School and having graduated from there, never went to school again. He then became a grocery apprentice, auto mechanic, carpenter, and worked in many jobs. Despite the hardships, he never ceased to write. During the Second World War he served the Turkish army for four years. In the army, he met Haygazun Kalustyan, a well-known Armenian poet. Gobelyan also knew another respected Armenian poet Garbis Cancikyan in Samatya. These three poets regularly met at Taksim at the Eptalofos Coffee Shop where they discussed literature and critiqued one another.

Gobelyan's first book of poems, Hopefully, was published in 1948. He along with Hagop Sivasliyan and Hacik Amiryan were one of the founding members of the Luys (Light) weekly newspaper. However, financial difficulties soon forced Luys to close down, after which Gobelyan was again forced to find another job. The newly established the Ayk (Dawn) daily newspaper in Beirut invited Gobelyan to become editor in 1953. He went to Beirut and continued his literary career by writing short stories and poems. In 1954 he returned to Istanbul to work for the Marmara newspaper. He went back to Beirut in 1957 and worked for the Spyurk (Diaspora) newspaper. He returned to Istanbul in 1965 and continued his work at Marmara. During this time, he also worked for the Jamanak newspaper. Gobelyan later worked at the Agos newspaper, writing and publishing in the Armenian and Turkish languages.

He died in December, 2010 and was buried in the Balikli Armenian cemetery.

== Literary works ==
- Երանի թէ (Hopefully) 1948
- Խճանկարներ (Mosaics) 1968
- Աշխարհի իններորդ հրաշալիքը (World's Ninth Wonder) 1972
- Երազ չունեցող մարդիկ (People Without Dreams) 1984
- Մենք անունը "հայ ծաղիկ" դրինք (We named it "Armenian Flower") 1991
- Հողով մկրտուածներ (Those Baptized from Soil) 1992
- Եօթն օրը հեղ մը (Once Every Seven days) 1995
- Կեանքի լուսանցքէն (From the Margin of Life) 1998
- Memleketini Özleyen Yengeç (The Crab that Misses its Homeland) 1998
