= Ancient Armenian poetry =

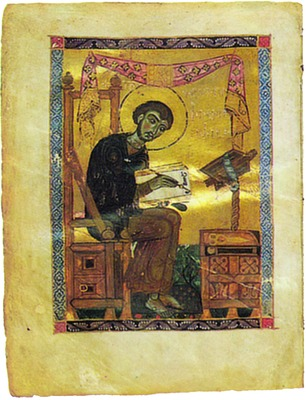
Gregory of Narek, miniature from a manuscript of The Book of Lamentations, 1173

Alongside old Armenian historiography and translated literature, poetry constituted a significant part of Armenian literature from the 5th to the 18th centuries. The rich tradition of oral literature preceded written poetry.

The earliest examples of ancient Armenian poetry were religious; the first collection of spiritual verses was compiled in the 7th century. It was precisely then that secular poetry began. The oldest surviving poem in the Armenian language dates back to the 7th century.

Grigor Narekatsi and Nerses IV the Gracious are considered the most influential poets who created before the 17th century. The literature of the 12th to 17th centuries represents the transition of Armenian civilization from the classical era to the contemporary. From the 13th century, a period of flourishing love poetry begins, and the theme of emigration is touched upon for the first time in verse. Epic poems appeared in the 15th-16th centuries. In the 17th and 18th centuries, the most popular was ashough poetry.

The works of Armenian poets were first published in 1513 in Venice. Old Armenian poetry was characterized by the use of accented rhyme.

== General characteristics ==
Pre-modern Armenian poetry underwent centuries of evolution. Written and oral folklore reflect the unified course of development of old Armenian literature. Although they developed differently, they were still interconnected. Secular oral poetry, for example, permeated various genres of written literature. According to the literary scholar Manuk Abeghian, old Armenian literature did not have a distinction between artistic and scientific-popular genres. "Poetic and non-poetic formed an undifferentiated whole." In the spiritual lyrics of the early period, the influence of the Holy Scriptures, theology, and exegesis is noticeably present։

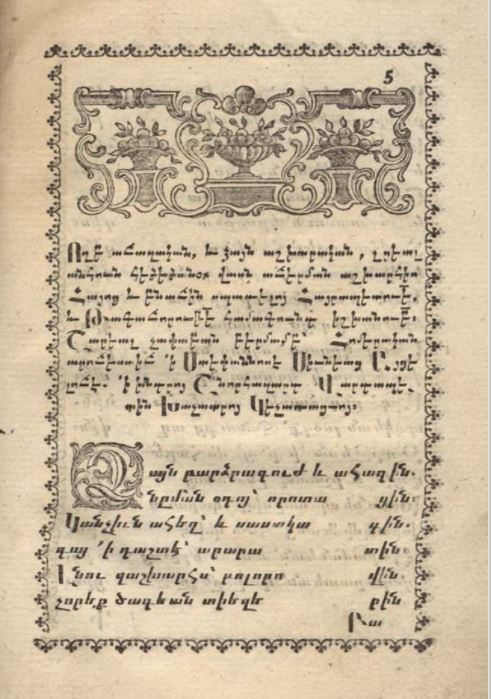
The publication of Stepanos Orbelian's poem "Lamentation at the door of the Holy Catholic Monastery" in 1304, Doni Nakhichevan, 1790

Pre-Christian Armenian poetry has been poorly preserved. In its edited form, it has been cited by historians as historical sources. Christian poets ignored the ancient oral heritage; their main sources of inspiration were faith and the Bible. In this regard, early Armenian poetry is almost entirely spiritual. The entirety of that lyric expresses only religious feelings in its form. Although early spiritual poetry was modeled on biblical Hebrew lyric poetry, it was most influenced by Greek spiritual poetry. The extent of that effect, however, has not been definitively determined. The works of Grigor Narekatsi mark a significant milestone in the history of medieval Armenian lyric poetry, encapsulating the achievements of preceding centuries with its humanistic ideas in the early 10th-11th centuries. Poetry gradually underwent changes, with secular themes coming to dominate it. An Armenian literary revival occurred in the medieval period. The turning point came in the first half of the 11th century when poetry underwent a radical transformation in both content and form, with its themes becoming richer. According to Abeghian, this period of transformation in Armenian literature was a "Renaissance" because during this time, contrary to religious and church ideology, secular spirit and the worldview of pagan centuries were "revived." This is also because Armenian literature of that period shares characteristics similar to the European Renaissance. Mainly, it is the literature of the citizens of Armenia. However, the onset of the Seljuk invasions significantly hindered the development of poetry.

From the 12th century, starting with Hovhannes Imastaser, poets praised nature, life's challenges, and love for the homeland. Poetic forms transformed, abandoning artificiality, remnants of antiquity, and elevated style, with simplicity and naturalness of thought becoming dominant. Simultaneously, literature emerged in Classical Old Armenian and Middle Armenian languages. According to Abeghian, true lyricism first appeared in the works of Nerses IV the Gracious, a contemporary of Imastaser (lover of knowledge). From the last quarter of the 13th century to the following three centuries, several lyrical genres emerged and evolved. It is considered that during this period, Armenian poetry finally freed itself from religious constraints.

Philosophical and didactic poetry continued to develop, and under the influence of preceding mystical poetry, love lyrics emerged. The theme of the turmoil of life took a new direction, touched upon by almost all Armenian poets of that era. According to Abeghian, Persian classical poetry had a significant impact on the lyrical poetry of that time, contributing, alongside internal circumstances, to a radical transformation of national poetry. Although there were various borrowings, especially in terms of form, Armenian poets of the 13th-14th centuries followed their own path. According to Valery Bryusov, Armenians participated in the development of the so-called "Eastern" poetic style, along with other ethnicities of Central Asia. Bryusov noted, "The historical mission of the Armenian people, which was predetermined throughout its development, was to seek and achieve a synthesis of the East and the West. And this aspiration was expressed most of all in the artistic creativity of Armenia, in its literature, in its poetry".

== Poetic genres ==
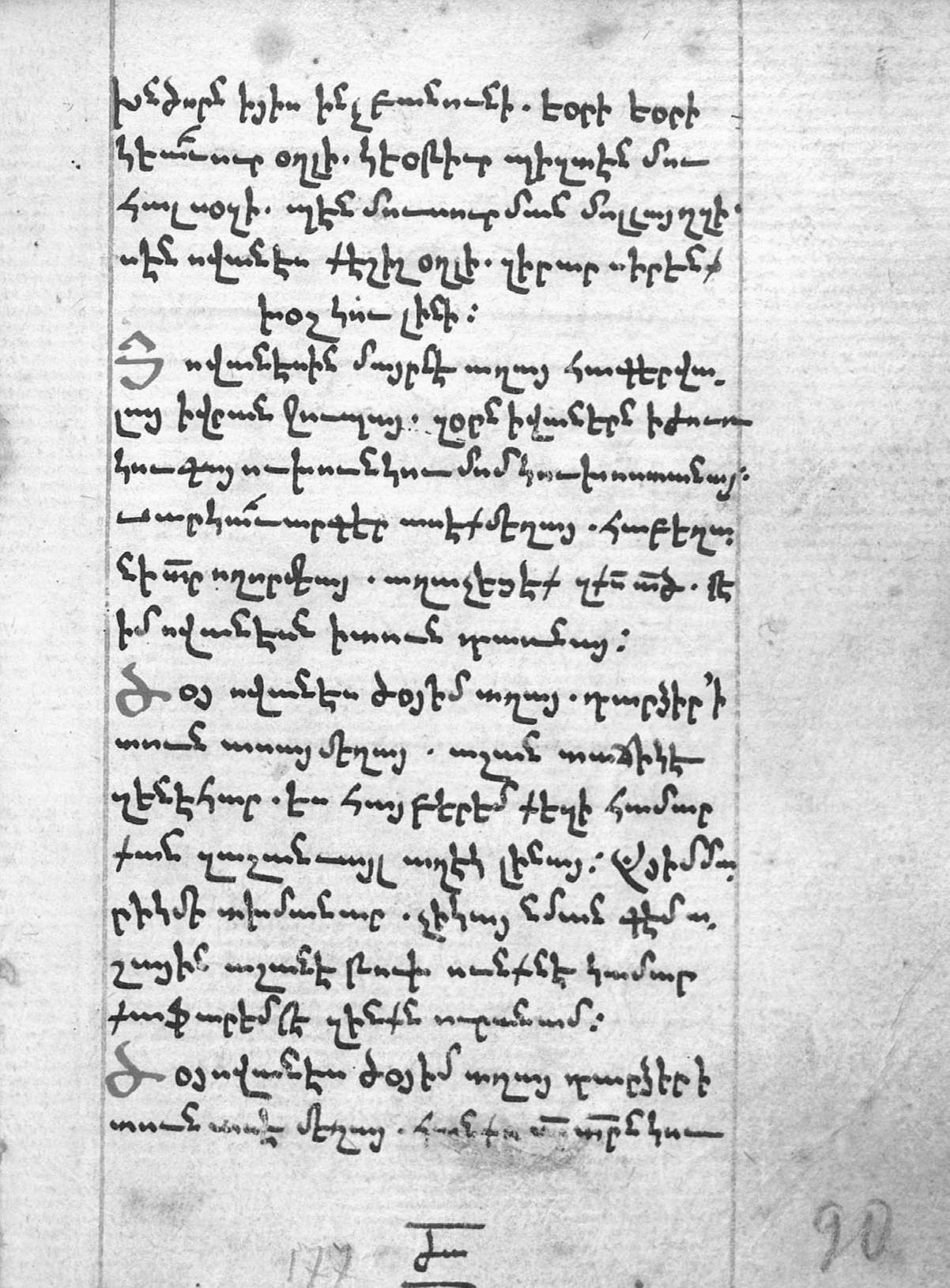
Page from a manuscript containing the poem "Hovhannes and Asha" by Hovhannes Pluz Erznkatsi

In old Armenian literature, a poetic work was commonly referred to as a tagh. It was synonymous with poetic expression, as explicitly indicated by Hovhan Vorotnetsi in the 14th century. The definition of the term tagh was provided by several medieval grammarians. The word was first recorded in the second half of the 5th century in the Armenian translation of Dionysius Thrax's "Art of Grammar". The initial explanation was given in the glossary attached to this translation in the same century. "A tagh is that which is written in measure," as Stepanos Syunetsi wrote in the 8th century, emphasizing that the square's dimensions might be disrupted due to neglect of the norms of proper reading. In the 13th century, Vardan Metz spoke of a poem as a vocal composition, highlighting the main condition for its perfection: harmony between words, melody, meaning, and measure. His contemporary poet and scholar, Hovhannes Pluz Erznkatsi, attempted to generalize the theoretical views of his predecessors, refining and supplementing them. Definitions of this concept were also provided by David of Zeitoon and Simeon Jugayetsi in the 16th-17th centuries. Based on the peculiarity of rhythm, David Kerakan in the 5th-6th centuries wrote about two types of rhyme, while Arakel Syunetsi, the author of border stanzas in the 14th-15th centuries, mentioned around four.

From the early Middle Ages, the official genre of spiritual poetry was the sharakan. During the 5th-15th centuries, the genre underwent significant internal transformations. The sharakan, therefore, is not a single and homogeneous genre, but a chrestomathy of medieval Armenian poetry.

Varag Nersisyan identified six main genres of poetry for literature from the 10th-16th centuries: praise, eulogy, admonition, lament, plea, and complaint. Praise is a lyrical work characterized by a laudatory plot, intended to showcase the positive qualities of a particular person or phenomenon. It incorporates elements of both hymn and ode. Praises are divided into three types: religious ones dedicated to saints, churches, the cross, etc.; national themes dedicated to Armenian historical figures, language, etc.; and purely secular praises dedicated to love, female beauty, etc. Most of them are written as acrostics. The opposite of praise was "parsav" (reproach), but their number is relatively small compared to the former. Dealing with moral issues, Parsav condemns evil, debauchery, and the like from certain moral positions.

Another poetic genre is "harat," which emerged in the 12th century. From the perspective of medieval religious and secular ideas, authors of treatises addressed various moral themes. Possibly, these were instructions that were later incorporated into choir compositions.

One of the most popular genres is lament. It had both purely lyrical and various epic-lyrical manifestations. Supplication (prayer) was a relatively rare genre. Its main distinguishing feature is a prayer to God or the Virgin Mary for the salvation of the soul. Such works reflect the aspirations of medieval people towards the salvation of the soul, questions of moral purity, etc. Some petitions were created in a pan-Armenian context.

In the 15th century, Arakel Baghishetsi writes: "Free the Armenians from the sufferings caused by evil nations. God is merciful." Gangat (complaint) is also highlighted as a separate genre. It is characterized by a spirit of complaint, a moderate mood of sadness arising from the lyrical hero's disagreement with the situation. Complaints are conventionally divided into three types: public-political, socio-disciplinary, and love-related.

Sergio La Porta also identified the genre of poetic discussion. He considered the genre's main distinctive features to be a three-part structure, insignificance of narrative elements, lifelessness of the main characters, and an argument about the superiority of one interlocutor over the others. P. Coue wrote about the genre of mirth: verses about joy and feasting. Asmik Simonyan considered kafu as a separate genre. According to her calculations, around 5000 lines of such poems have been preserved. Kaphi refers to poetic interjections in translated and original prose novels. Since the 16th century, they have been imitated separately in poetic anthologies. Like pre-modern Russian literature, some poetic works are not clearly differentiated by genre and, at the same time, carry traits of different genres.

== Rhyme and measure in old Armenian poetry ==
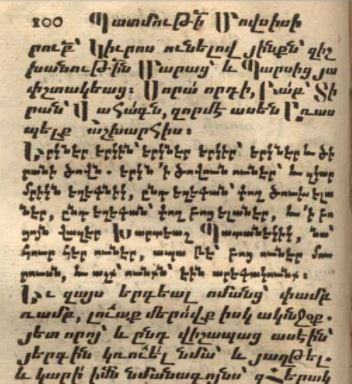
The pre-Christian song "Birth of Vahagn", excerpt from "History of Armenia" by Movses Khorenatsi, published in 1695, Amsterdam

Early works of Armenian poetry were not rhymed; rhyme emerged in Armenia in the 11th century. According to Manuk Abeghian, it was already in use in the 10th century and was adopted into Armenian culture from Arabic poetry. According to Sharafkhanyan, early poetic samples contain repetitions that can be considered the beginning of rhyming. For example, in the pre-Christian song "Birth of Vahagn by Movses Khorenatsi: (Sky—sky, sky—earth, sky and sea—apricot, khur hers). Lexical repetitions are found in several early spiritual songs and hymns. Rhyme appears in the last lines of "Oghb..." by Davtak Kertogh (7th century). Both this poem and its contemporary, "Consecrated Souls" by Komitas Aghtsetsi, are written in acrostic form, where each stanza begins alternately with each of the 36 letters of the Armenian alphabet.

Grigor Narekatsi first wrote about rhyme as a literary phenomenon in the year 1003. "I am one of those whose life is cruel, whose tears flow like a fountain, and who turns a sigh into a word with the monotonous ending of song lines." In 1045, Grigor Magistros's poem "A Thousand Lines of Manuk" was entirely written in rhyme. After the 12th century, non-rhymed poetic works are extremely rare.

Sharafkhanyan divided rhyme in ancient Armenian lyrics into two types: monosyllabic rhyme and polysyllabic rhyme. The first type is more characteristic of the early period, although it continued to be used by some poets until the 17th century. Among them are "Lament at the Door of the Holy Catholic Church" by Stepanos Orbelyan, several poems by Khachatur Kecharetsi, a significant portion of Frik's poems, and works by Konstantin Erznkatsi. Arakel Syunetsi, Mkrtich Nagash, Hovannes Tlkurantsi, Grigoris Akhtamartsi, Martiros Khrimetsi, and Nerses Mokatsi also created monophonic works. Ending all lines with the same rhyme was considered the epitome of perfection in the Middle Ages, but in extensive works, this style created a certain monotony. This approach was criticized in 1151 by Nerses Shnorhali in the poem "Word of Faith". According to Gevorg Emin, Shnorhali was the "first of medieval poets to master the art of rhyme". His student Grigor Tgha, who excelled in poetic form, created verses with double, cross, and circular rhyme. From this period, a tendency towards the gradual development of polysyllabic rhyme can be observed. Its expressions were extremely diverse. In the 12th-14th centuries, the art of rhyme reached significant development. The majority of folk poetry was also syllabic and rhymed.

If early spiritual hymns were characterized by limited lyrical dimensions, the hymns of developed feudalism stood out for their greater diversity. One of the main poetic forms of early medieval hymns was the complex tetrameter iambic quatrain. In the same period, the tetrameter anapest gained significance. An example of this is the work of Komitas Aghtetsi. Grigor Narekatsi and Grigor Magistros, who lived in the 10th-11th centuries, already employed secular dimensions. Narekatsi wrote several chapters of his poem in "native dimensions". Nerses Shnorhali made a significant contribution to the development of Armenian calligraphy in the 12th century. Some calligraphic forms he developed even transitioned into modern Armenian literature. Quatrains were most common in works with a strophic structure. Armenian grammarians from the 5th to the 17th centuries, such as Movses Kertogh, David Kerakan, Vardan Mets, Esayi Nshetsi, and Simeon Jughayetsi, delved into theoretical questions of rhyme, syllabic writing, and rhyming.

== Folklore ==
=== Pre-Christian era ===
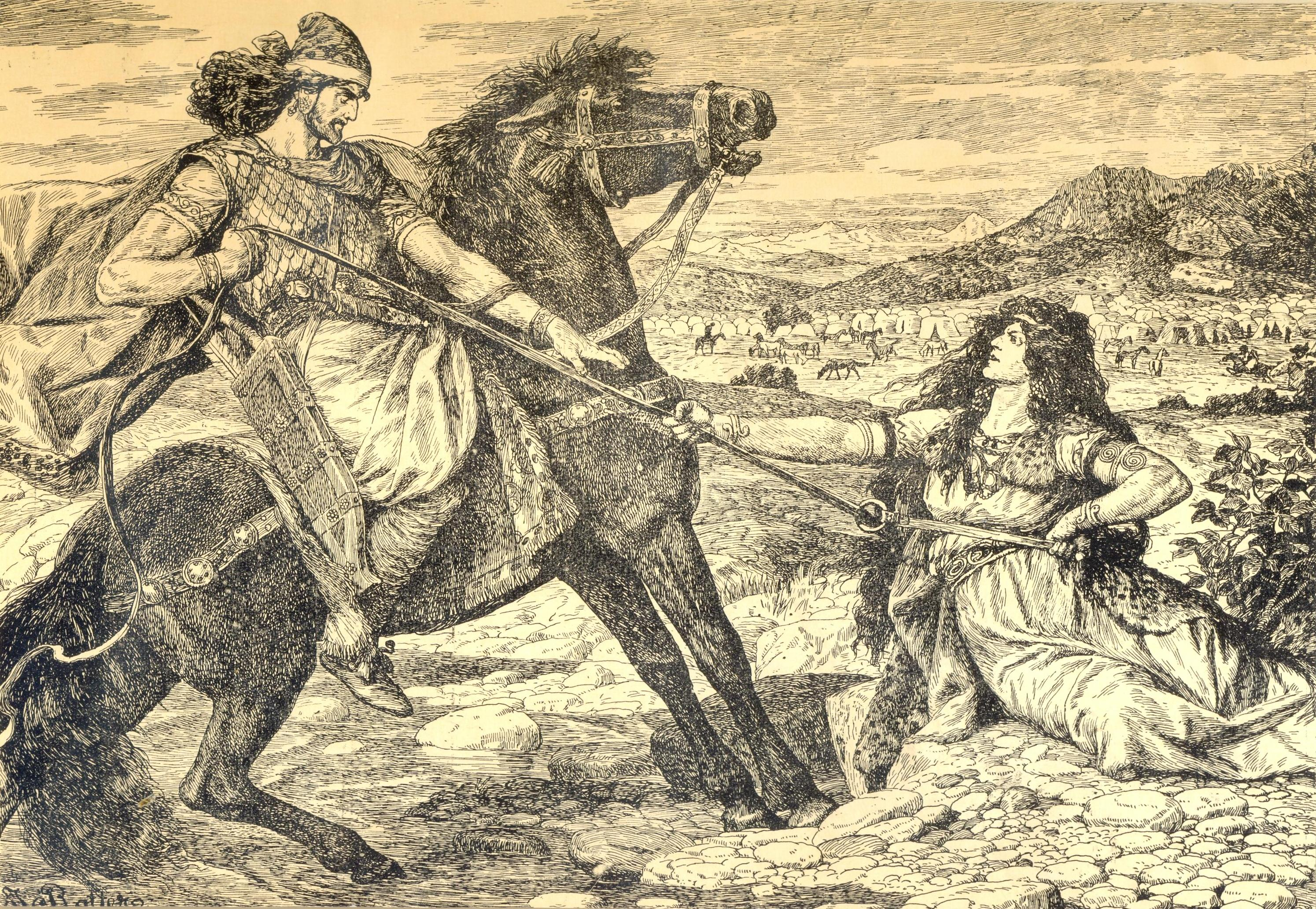
Artashes and Satenik, artist: Josef Rotter

The roots of Armenian folklore trace back to the era of the formation of the Armenian ethnicity. After the emergence of written literature in the early 5th century, folklore became one of its main and important components. Continuing to evolve even after the advent of literacy, it significantly influenced the artistic literature of the late Middle Ages. Various genres of folklore (riddles, fables, songs, legends) enriched literature. James Russell said that Armenian writers of the 5th century drew on rich oral literary traditions, including lyrical poetry and music. Samples of ancient and medieval Armenian folklore have been preserved in written monuments, often in complex forms. Poetic monuments in prose or poetic form have been preserved in the works of ancient Armenian historians of the 5th-8th centuries, such as Movses Khorenatsi, Faustus Byzantium, Agathangelos, Sebeos, and Hovhannes Mamikonian.

Pre-Christian poetry is divided into two categories: mythic narratives and mythological-historical plots. The latter emerged in the 7th-2nd centuries BCE. According to Elizabeth Redgate, while the religious life of early medieval Armenian nobility had much in common with Byzantium and Germanic Europe, their secular life resembled ancient Iranian and Germanic nobility. The traditions of minstrels, storytellers, and oral poetry were so ingrained in Armenia that they infiltrated monasteries, similar to Iranian and Germanic culture. Kings and generals wanted their deeds to be written in verses. Singer-storytellers were often members of the royal court and went to war to describe heroic exploits. Among the poetic-song examples of folklore were folk tales, novellas, ritual, and lyrical songs. The oldest Armenian legends and myths included stories and songs about Hayk, Aram, Ara the Handsome, Tork Angegh, Artavasdes, Vahagn, Tigran and Azhdahak, Ervand and Ervaz. Some of them encompass various cultural and historical layers. According to Russell, the song "Birth of the Shield," written by Khorenatsi, contains features of a pre-Indo-European past and resembles an episode from Vedic literature. The worship of the Tree of Life, praised in medieval Armenian songs, likely traces back to Urartian customs. "The Birth of Vahagn," the oldest Armenian poem that has come down to us, narrates the birth of the god of thunder Vahagn. Legends about Tigran and Azhdahak recount events from the 2nd-1st centuries BCE, introducing the image of the first woman. According to Robert Thomson, the few surviving examples of pre-literary culture reflect the real interests and preferences of ancient Armenia.

From written sources, it is clear that throughout the Middle Ages, the church condemned the minstrel tradition. In the late 5th century, Catholicos John Mandakuni wrote about the insanely drunk minstrels who indulged in debauchery. The condemnatory attitude towards minstrels was reflected in the decisions of the Fourth Council of Dvin in 645. According to Elizabeth Redgate, the content of the oral tradition posed a threat to the church. Minstrels preserved stories about pagan gods and ancestors, thereby preventing potential Christianization of the land. The church's critical attitude towards minstrel art persisted for a long time. In the "Judgment Book" of 1184, Mkhitar Gosh noted that it is "frightening for a Christian to hear, let alone see". At the turn of the 14th and 15th centuries, Matteos Jughaeci warned: "Do not go to the minstrels, they tell tales of Hayk and nurture the spirit of disobedience".

=== After Christianization ===
See also David of Sassoun

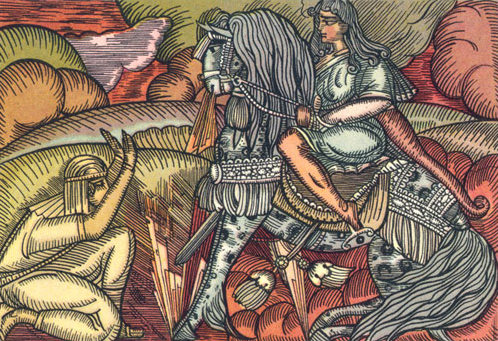
David of Sassoun, artist: Hakob Kojoyan

The ancient Armenian Christian epic "Persian War" was created in the 3rd-5th centuries. It narrates the struggle of Armenia against the Sasanian Iran. Parts of it have come down to us through the works of early medieval Armenian historians, most fully in the works of Agathangelos and Faustus Byzantium. The next epic is the "Taron War," fragments of which were preserved by the historians of the 7th-8th centuries, Hovhannes Mamikonian and Sebeos. Among other things, they include epic songs and narrate events from the 5th century. In the 7th-10th centuries, the poetic epic "David of Sassoun" was created as an expression of social and religious protest against Arab rule. In the "third branch" of the epic, David appears not only as a warrior but also as a singer and poet. Although its origin dates back to the pre-Christian era, the most significant influence on the final formation of the epic came from the anti-Arab uprisings of 749 and 851. According to Kamilla Trever, there are some echoes of the pre-Christian deity Mithra-Mihr in the epic. The earliest written mention of it dates back to the 16th century. It was first published by Garegin Srvandztians in 1874. Sentimental folk songs date back to approximately the 13th-14th centuries and peaked in the 17th-18th centuries. The folk song "Song of Levon" about the liberation of Cilician prince Levon from captivity in 1268 has survived, and the song "Wild Bird" also belongs to the same period.

Writers not only quoted in their works but also drew from folklore sources. According to Theo van Lint, poets began utilizing folklore materials from the 10th century. Borrowings from folk-poetic works can be found around Nerses Shnorhali in the mid-12th century. Based on folk folklore, he composed poetic riddles. Hovhannes Pluz Erznkatsi occasionally relied on folklore. Martiros of Crimea and Naghash Hovnatan, among poets of the early modern era, used folklore plots. Folk poetry was a significant feature of the literature of the 16th-17th centuries, and it was also developed and utilized by synagogues. In 1620, Khachatur Kafetsi compiled the first collection of folk songs, including about 20 texts. He divided them into high, medium, and low styles. However, it is unknown whether this was an accepted classification or his own. There are examples of the interpenetration of folk and didactic literature for pedagogical purposes.

== Poetry of the 5th-9th centuries ==
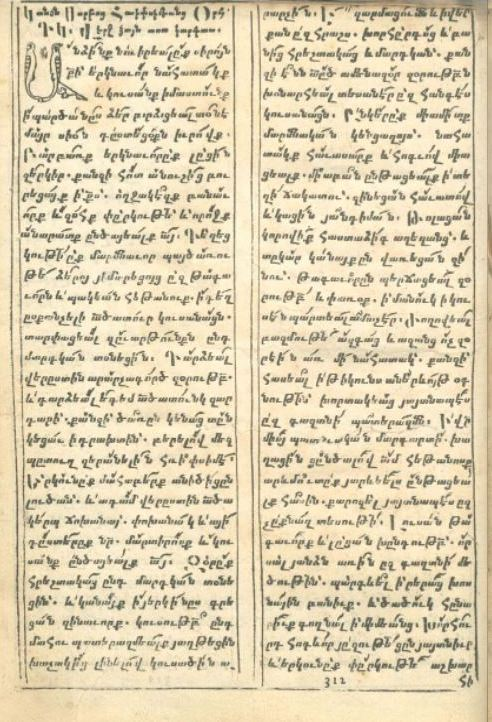
Page from Komitas Aghtsetsi's poem "Souls Sacrificed by Themselves" from 618, Amsterdam, 1698

Spiritual song performed during religious ceremonies was one of the tools for spreading the Christian religion. The earliest works of this genre were primarily translations of Greek hymns. They stimulated the creation of original texts. The most common type of Armenian religious hymns is hymns, the oldest examples of which are attributed to Sahak the Parthian, Mesrop Mashtots, and Hovhannes Mandakuni, who lived in the 5th century. About 80 works of Stepanos Syunetsi I have also come down to us, who was probably one of Mashtots's younger disciples. There are many "testimonies" of authors of medieval hymns, the oldest of which dates back to the 13th century. The history of the hymn is usually divided into two periods: the 5th-10th centuries and the 10th-15th centuries. Initially, they were called "chords", and the term "hymn" became known from the 12th century. The first poems presented biblical plots created on the model of ancient Jewish religious literature. Chords are similar to Greek troparia and Syriac madrasas. From the very beginning of the genre's inception, alongside universal Christian ideas, they discussed the most important events of national life. For example, in Mandakuni's hymns, the founders of the Armenian church and national faith, Grigor Lusavorich, Sahak the Parthian, and Mesrop Mashtots, are glorified. The latter, according to Mandakuni, like Moses, "brought to Armenian land the memorable tablet of commandments". In the 7th century, Barsegh Chun compiled the first collection of unique spiritual hymns. During this time, the first layman lived, whose spiritual poetry was officially recognized and included in the "Sharaknots," Prince Ashot Bagratuni, who ruled Armenia in 685–689. In the 7th-8th centuries, Armenian spiritual hymn entered a new stage of development, characterized by deepening the national essence of the genre, enriching content, and perfecting expressive means. One of the best works of that era is the acrostic by Komitas Aghtsetsi "Souls Given by Themselves". In the 8th century, Stepanos Syunetsi carried out a new regulation of spiritual hymns, and the canonical genre emerged. In his essay "Interpretation of Grammar," he wrote that grammar is based on literature, and poetic works are guided by the latter during creation. During this time, Sahak Dzoroporetsi and Hovhannes Odznetsi enriched spiritual hymnody with their works. There are also women among the poets of the 8th century: Khosrovidukht and Sahakadukht. The latter also composed music for her works. Saհakadukht is the. Until the 10th century, most hymns were written in the form of ordinary verses, without meter and rhyme, but they were rhythmic and suitable for singing. The song genre continued to exist until the 14th century.

Sharakans were one of the important components of the ideology of the Armenian Church, reflecting its official doctrine. According to Suren Zolyan, a hymn "is not only a poetic genre but also a propagandistic and ideological genre". They also pursued didactic and moral purposes. After the Council of Chalcedon in 451 AD, the Armenian Church, having separated, became more of a carrier of national-political ideas, following its own official line and ignoring changes occurring in the rest of the Christian world. In its teaching, it relied on early Christianity, which was closer to Mediterranean culture. The conservatism of hymns allowed preserving elements of early medieval East Mediterranean Christian civilization. The leading role in Armenian hymns was played not by ordinary Christians but by national saints. Through the biblical model of struggle and death for faith, religious poets expressed the worldview of the heroes of national history. Hymns, in general, are characterized by the unity of metaphor and history. Being spiritual poetry, most of the characters represented in them come from the Bible and the Gospels. The poetics of hymns are determined by their internal evolution over millennia, with strict adherence to established rules.

=== Komitas I Aghtsetsi ===
Biographical information about Komitas is scarce. He served as the Catholicos from 616 to 628 and initiated the construction of Saint Rhipsime church. Komitas Aghtsetsi is the author of the spiritual hymn "Souls Sacrificed by Themselves". This extensive lyrical poem, written around 618, is the oldest surviving Armenian poem. "Souls Sacrificed by Themselves" is presented in the form of an acrostic and consists of 36 stanzas, each beginning with the correct letter of the Armenian alphabet. It preserves the rules of ancient metrics, where each line consists of three four-syllable feet. Unlike previous hymns, its theme is drawn not from the Bible but from Armenian history. Komitas' source is the historical sketch by Agathangelos. The plot unfolds at the end of the 3rd century, when, according to tradition, Saint Rhipsime and her companions were martyred for the Christianization of Armenia. Aghtsetsi was an innovator, elevating spiritual lyricism to a new level and contributing to its further development. Komitas created characters and metaphors. The poem is characterized by festive and joyful solemnity. Many later authors followed his artistic principles. According to "The Heritage of Armenian Literature. Authors of the Book 'From the Sixth to the Eighteenth Century'," "The exceptional poetry and lyricism of this sharakan opened a new era in Armenian spiritual literature".

== The birth of secular poetry ==
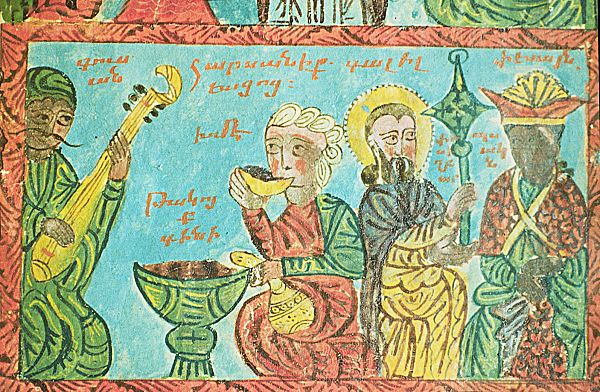
Gusan performs a song at the wedding. 16th century miniature

The cultural revival of the 7th century encompassed various areas of literature. Although church matters still held paramount importance, some poets dedicated their creativity to secular themes of the time. Since manuscripts were copied by priests, such works were not transcribed and were lost. Only a small portion of secular poems from the early Middle Ages has reached us. "Lamentation on the Death of Grand Prince Jevanshir," by the poet Davtak Kertogh of the late 7th century, is the first monument of Armenian secular poetry. The text is cited from Movses Kaghankatvatsi's work "The History of the Country of Aluank." According to the "Oxford History of Historical Writing," the "section dedicated to the exploits of Jevanshir ends with the earliest surviving specimen of Armenian secular poetry, which has come down to us since the adoption of Christianity...". No biographical information about Davtak has been preserved. "Lamentation..." is written in the form of an acrostic, where the initial letters of the verses reproduce the Armenian alphabet. According to Theo van Lint's work, Davtak's creativity involves a synthesis of techniques from the oral literary tradition of the gusans and written poetry. Thus, he depicts the process of Christianization of ancient Armenian culture. Van Lint presented Davtak as an example of a Christian gusan. Charles Dowsett suggested that fragments of the text could have been part of a broader public address to Jevanshir, possibly delivered by Davtak himself. Several researchers point to an earlier poetic excerpt preserved in one of the interpretations of Dionysius Thrax's "Grammar". An anonymous commentator of the "Grammar," in explaining another phrase, provides an example from "David's Poem." It's just three lines dedicated to King Tigran and his sister Tigranuhi. Elsewhere in the same text, David is mentioned as the author of the work "Armeno-Marakian War". Some scholars consider him a separate author, while others identify him with the philosopher David the Invincible or David Kerakan (David Grammarian).

== 10-12th Centuries ==
The literature of the 10th to 12th centuries represents a distinct historical period characterized by new artistic qualities, reflecting the changes occurring in Armenia's political, economic, and social life. While continuing old traditions in analyzing current issues, literature became even closer to everyday life. Often, while maintaining a religious perspective, it sought to express new emotional nuances. From a perspective of philanthropy, patriotism, and other noble ideals, literature extolled nature, human beauty, external and internal merits such as strength and virtue. There was an assertion of the necessity for a more realistic portrayal of human relationships and psychology.

During this period, poetry experienced an unprecedented rise. In poetic form, moral teachings, sermons, martyrdoms, testimonials, memorial services, etc., were sometimes composed. Various extensive verses, philosophical poems, hymns, riddles were written. The emergence of poetry is primarily associated with the name of Grigor Narekatsi. Parallel to Classical Armenian (Grabar), works were also written in Middle Armenian. Manuk Abegyan referred to the 12th century as a period when Armenian poetry "descended from heaven to earth".

=== Grigor Narekatsi ===
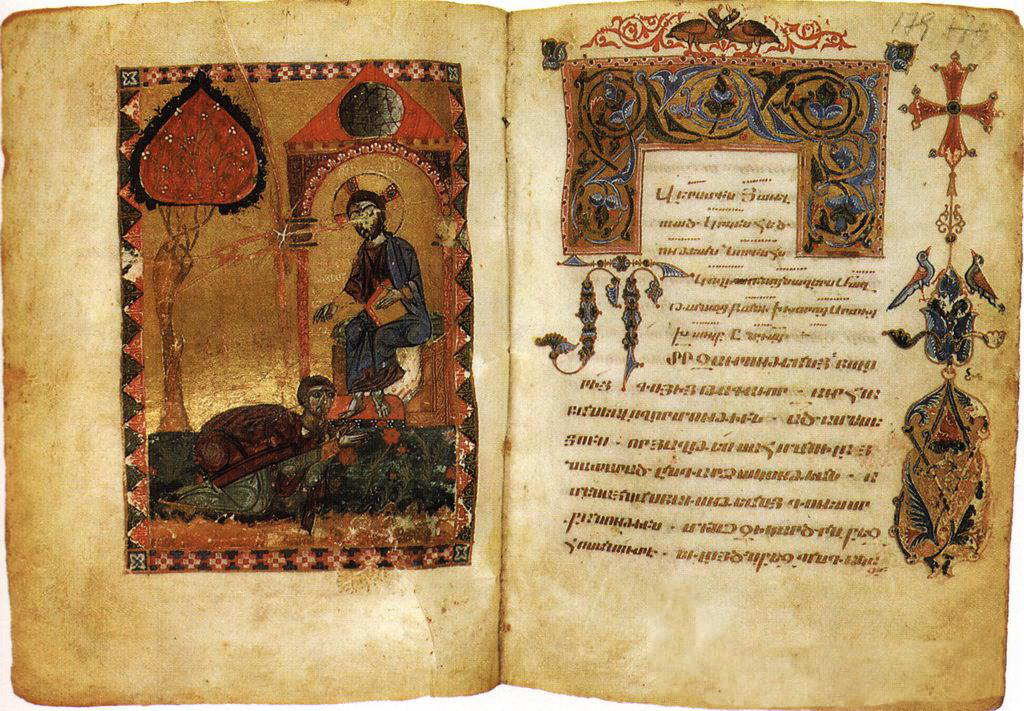
Grigor Narekatsi. Miniature from "The Book of Lamentations", 1173

Grigor Narekatsi is considered the greatest spiritual poet in the history of Armenia. The British Encyclopedia regarded him as the main literary figure of 10th-century Armenia. Narekatsi was born in the mid-10th century into the family of a theologian, Bishop Khosrov Andzevatsi, and spent his entire life in Narekavank, located in the southwestern part of Armenia, where he received education and upbringing from one of Armenia's most progressive figures of the time, Anania Narekatsi. He is best known as the author of the poem "Book of Lamentations," consisting of ninety-five chapters and 10,000 lines, written in 1001–1002. The entire poem represents the author's internal monologue. Each chapter is dedicated to the theme of detachment and unity with God. The poet wrote about his sufferings from separation from God, arising from sinfulness, and the longing for union with the Almighty. At times, the somber mood and dictation contrast with bright, festive tones and hues. Narekatsi indirectly touched upon themes of both spiritual and certain aspects of human and natural beauty. Under his influence, Armenian poetry gave rise to and developed powerful lyrics about the "vanity of the world". The motif of repentance and love for God resembles Augustine's "Confessions". At the end of the poem, he mentions the attack by the "invincible and great Roman Emperor Basil" on northwestern Armenia in 1000.

The poem "Book of Lamentations" is the first great poetic work of Armenian literature. The language of the work is sometimes straightforward but vivid and innovative. According to Robert Thomson, Narekatsi's rhyme resembles the Arabic syllabic script "saj". Speaking about rhyme, Narekatsi emphasized that the same harmony at the end of lines enhances their emotional impact. According to Valery Bryusov, "Grigor Narekatsi brought the form of poetry to a high perfection, lovingly cultivating the 'vocal harmony' long before its flowering in Persian and Arabic lyrics".

== Further development of poetry ==
After Narekatsi's death, as well as due to subsequent economic, political, and demographic reasons, Armenian literature underwent profound changes. Although he made significant strides in refining rhyme technique, the main credit for this is generally attributed to Grigor Magistros. His "Letters" contain secular and religious verses, admonitions, and exhortations, written with a vivid patriotic fervor. The master's main poetic work is the poem "A Thousand Lines to Manuche," a brief translation of the Bible written in 1045. He left his mark on the history of national poetry primarily through the refinement of metric technique. Magistros' innovations became a model for imitation until the late 17th century. Grigor Narekatsi's literary achievements are closely associated with the famous phrase of Vardan Anetsi, who lived in the 11th century: "I made Vardan the Vardapet sing to him." Grounded in Christian worldview, he tended towards themes of the past, going back to pagan times. The book is characterized by a vivid artistic style, sincere inspiration, and unity of content and structure. In the early 12th century, Vardan Haykazn's monumental work "To the Blessed and Holy Catholicos Gregory II the Martyrophile of Armenia" gave rise to the genre of biographical poems. It was written in 1105 to mark the death of Gregory II the Martyrophile (Grigor Vkaheaser).

Hovhannes Imastaser (Hovhannes Deacon) played a significant role in the further development of literature. Only a small part of his rich literary legacy has survived to this day: an epic, several hymns, and the 188-line poem "For Wisdom…," which represents a dialogue between the poet and a "mountain". He was one of the first to proclaim his "ars poetica" in Armenian reality, a theory of understanding poetic art. The Deacon developed the idea that the basis of true art is nature; the poet must study nature as a source of inspiration. In his view, art is created in imitation of nature, and the more it strives for naturalness, the more perfect it is; he reflected on the relationship between nature and art. Peter Cowe called "A Wise Conversation…" one of the earliest examples of Armenian didactic poetry.

The surviving works of Grigor Marashetsi reflect a high level of poetic artistry. His religious-themed works, including "Lament" ("Vaygirk"), aimed for a new artistic quality. They are lyrical reflections of real events, written under significant influence from folk songs and Grigor Narekatsi's poem "Book of Lamentations (Narek)".

Nerses Lambronatsi's poetic legacy is distinguished by over twenty hymns, in which he continued the literary traditions of Nerses Shnorhali. His 938-line epilogue is dedicated to the life and work of Nerses Shnorhali.

In terms of its connection to the next stage of classical poetry, the role of Grigor D Tha is significant. His 3,000-line epic-lyric poem "Lamentation over the capture of Jerusalem" written in 1189, expresses the idea of the independence of Cilician Armenia. His work also shows the influence of Grigor Narekatsi.

== Nerses Shnorhali ==
Main article Nerses the Gracious

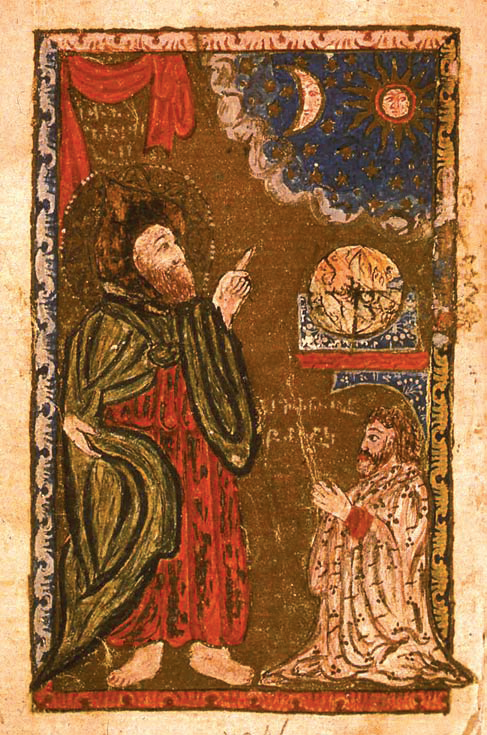
Nerses Shnorali and Mkhitar Heratsi, a medieval manuscript

Nerses Shnorhali was a renowned poet of the 12th century. Shnorhali lived and worked during a difficult historical period when Armenians were forced to migrate to Syria, Cilicia, and other places, fighting for their autonomy against Byzantine and regional rulers. The growing trend towards poetic discourse prompted writers and translators to create multifaceted narratives: historical, didactic, scientific, and literary, translating the works of Homer, David, Solomon, and Jeremiah, often turning prose texts into verse. Shnorhali wrote in this environment, creating works in various genres. Educated as a priest and ordained as a catholicos in 1166, Shnorhali was a proponent of national and church interests. His views found reflection in the historical poem "Lament for Edessa," written in 1145. The work was the first of its kind in Armenian literature. The poem consists of about 4000 lines. It tells the story of the destruction of Edessa, a major center of the Christian world in Upper Mesopotamia, and the massacre of its Christian population by the Seljuk forces of Imad ad-Din Zangi. Shnorhali introduced several innovations, including personification and the pentasyllabic iamb, which became a standard for later poets. The work contributed to the establishment of lamentation as a dominant poetic form and served as a source of inspiration for subsequent authors and many generations. It gained great fame in the Middle Ages. Manuk Abegian considered "Lament for Edessa" a masterpiece of Nerses Shnorhali.

== 13-16th Centuries ==
=== The ultimate triumph of secular trends ===
According to Theo van Lint, poets starting from the 13th century wrote in genres that were freed from various poetic forms existing in the church. The range of topics they covered expanded. Gradually, religious tendencies receded into the background, and love poetry flourished. P. Cow divided it into two categories: those that praise the physical qualities of the beloved woman (praise) and those that tell of unrequited love (lament). Cultural trends of the time were often influenced by political, economic, and military events. Despite the difficult conditions of the 13th to 16th centuries, thanks to cultural and educational centers both in Armenia and in the Diaspora, the accumulated intellectual heritage was preserved. New monuments of poetry were created, and the developing translated literature continued to enrich the national literature. In monasteries, students were taught to compose poetic works. Special "dictionaries" were compiled for use in poetry. Collections of poems called "Tagharan" were also written there. An important event in cultural life was the emergence of Armenian printing in Venice in 1512. Literature became even closer to life. Middle Armenian became the dominant literary language instead of the endangered classical grabar. The proportion of poetic speech increased, as did its social and ideological significance in literature. Becoming the heritage of the masses, lyricism became even closer to folklore, finding common ways of connection with folk songs, their way of thinking, and character creation. The commonly used poetic forms were praise, lament, exhortation, lamentation, nativity, and kapkh, which discussed themes of love, nature, social status, wandering, and morality. In these works, the sorrow of the people, personalities, patriotic feelings, and philosophical reflections on the social situation, death, soul, and body were expressed. Numerous epic, epic-lyrical, and didactic poems were created, dedicated to heroic periods or individual characters throughout the history of Armenia. According to K. Bardakchyan, "both in allegorical poems and in patriotic works of the past, there was a certain hope for revival". Poetic developments based on themes from the Sacred Book were made, as well as artistic descriptions of various scientific issues.

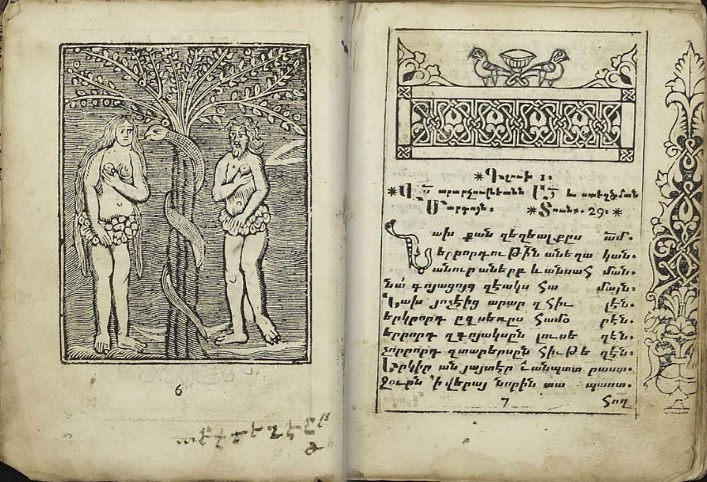
Page from "The Book of Adam", 1721, Constantinople

From the 14th century, poems were created in which, unlike the dogmas of Christian doctrine, preference was given to earthly human aspirations. Dedicated to the Virgin Mary, the apostles, ordinary Christians, national saints, and sanctuaries, they express more secular than religious phenomena. This trend is partly noticeable even in hymns written for religious rituals. The best examples of these genres belong to authors such as Khachatur Taronatsi, Vardan Areveltsi, Hakob Klayetsi, Mkhitar Ayrvanetsi, Hovhannes Plyuz Erznkatsi, Gevorg Skevratsi, Kirakos Erznkatsi, and Grigor Khlatesi.

Partially preserved is the historical-lyrical poem of the 13th-14th centuries by Anonymous Syunetsi. The events depicted in it take place in Syunik under the heavy yoke of the Mongols over Armenia. His contemporary, Khachatur Kecharetsi, lamented the misfortunes that befell Armenia. The psychological image of the medieval man is reflected in the works of Kecharetsi. Editing the ancient Armenian translation of the history of Alexander the Great, he wrote more than 100 kapkh – eight-line secular lyrical poems – in various chapters. His lamentations and exhortations reflected both religious and secular ideals and ideas of the author. Kecharetsi used vivid nature imagery in his short poems. He was against dogmatism and unnecessary moralizing. In the early 14th century, Terter Yerevantsi lived in Yerevan, the first of the renowned poets born here. He received his initial spiritual education at the monastery of Teghenyats near Bjni, then in the 1330s-1340s, he moved to Crimea. A poem that survived from him is written in a dramatic form: the poem "Dispute about the vineyard, wine, and sage". S. La Porta attributed it to the genre of poetic dispute. The resident of Yerevan emphasized the limitations of human reason, which determine its natural common sense. The poet Hovhannes Tlkurantsi at the beginning of the 14th-15th centuries was the first to praise physical beauty directly, without allegory. Like Hovhannes Pluz Erznkatsi before him, he prioritized love over religious affiliation. Tlkurantsi sometimes synthesized themes of love and nature. He authored several moral and didactic poems. The poem "If there were no men" outlines the poet's thoughts on life and death. He is attributed several love poems. His work shows the influence of traditional Eastern poetry.

At the turn of the 15th and 16th centuries, ashug poetry emerged, although the roots of this art go back to pre-Christian times. Poetry occupies an important place in the multi-genre legacy of Arakel Syuntsi. His works reveal the world through a religious prism. Syuntsi's works are distinguished by vivid imagination, clear composition, and richness of artistic means of expression. Syuntsi was also an unparalleled master of acrostic. The lyrical poem "Paradise Book" tells about the afterlife, structurally reminiscent of Dante's works. However, the masterpiece of his work is the "Book of Adam," created in 1401–1403, consisting of three poems. Analyzing the theme of Adam and Eve's expulsion from paradise, Syuntsi touched upon the question of the loss of happiness for all mankind. Thanks to its dramatic construction, descriptions from real life revealing the psychological nature of the main characters, "Adamgirk" became one of the unique works of Armenian literature. Manuk Abegyan considered it the third great work of Armenian spiritual poetry. The works of Arakel Bagisetsi date back to the first half of the 15th century. Of particular value is his "Song of Hovasape" (1434), which is a poetic adaptation of the medieval romance "Varlaam and Hovasap". His historical poems dedicated to Gregory the Illuminator and Nerses the Great are remarkable. One of the many facets of Bagisetsi's multifaceted works was the problem of Armenian emigration, existence. His fellow villager Mkrtich Nagash enriched the genre of pilgrimage song. The humanistic views of the author were vividly expressed in didactic verses, lyrical and epitaphic lamentations. The secular nature of Mkrtich Nagash's work is especially evident in poems about nature and love, the best of which is considered the allegorical "Song of the Rose and the Nightingale". His poems express the intersection of Christian ideas and folk wisdom. The artistic and aesthetic principles of Hovhanes Erznkatsi, Frik, and Konstantin Erznkatsi in the 15th century were followed by Kerovbe- the author of sepulchral poetry. Kerovbe wrote about the transience of human existence, the importance of meaning in life.

Poetry of the 16th century is characterized by stylistic diversity. In the first half of the 16th century, literature associated with the Ottoman-Persian wars experienced a general decline. K. Bardakchyan called the 16th century a transitional period. Grigoris Akhtamaretsi occupied an important place in Armenian poetry in the first half of the 16th century; he was the author of predominantly secular and religious verses. Akhtamartsi's verses are distinguished by a richness of metaphors, elegance of style, and a desire to reveal the inner world of the main character. Grigoris' creativity is characterized by a luxurious Eastern style, abundance of comparisons and epithets. The author's patriotic and life-affirming aspirations were particularly evident in the lyrical lament "Every Morning and Light." He elaborated on the "History of the Copper City" and the "History of Alexander the Great," supplementing them with his own verses, which are characterized by great stylistic brilliance; Akhtamartsi sometimes used allegory. Zakaria Gnuneci continued the literary traditions of Akhtamartsi. The latter was a contemporary of the lyricist Hovasap Sebastatsi; he was a master of the female psychological portrait. In historical-didactic verses and poems, he described the catastrophic events of his time, various aspects of life, creating impeccable images. In the 16th century, Deacon Berdaktsi, Vrtanes Surnketsi, Hovhanes Varagetsi, Martiros Kharberdtsi, Martiros Kharasartsi (the latter wrote cheerful festive songs, becoming the initiator of this genre in national lyrics), Tadeos Tokhatsi, Astvatsatur, and others composed as well.

=== The development of love lyrics: Hovhannes Yerznkatsi Pluz and Kostandin Yerznkatsi ===
Main articles Hovhannes Erznkatsi and Kostandin Erznkatsi

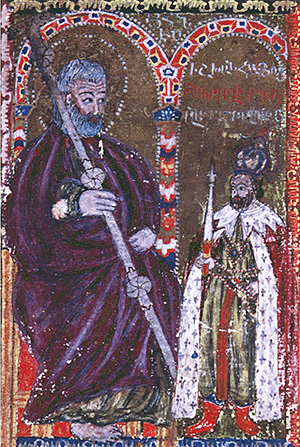
Hovhannes Erznaktsi Pluz and prince Aplots, miniature 1644

N. Kebanyan considers Hovhannes Pluz Erznkatsi's poem "Hovhannes and Asha" as the first secular love work in Armenian literature. Hovhannes Pluz Erznkatsi was born around 1230 in the city of Erznka and died around 1293. "Hovhannes and Asha" tells the story of the love between a priest's son and a gadi's daughter. Erznkatsi placed the idea of love above religious prejudices. In the poem, Armenian love poetry is free from religious morality. His rich literary legacy includes both secular and religious works. Soulful laments and hymns dedicated to the Virgin Mary, Gregory the Illuminator, Nerses the Great, and other saints expressed the author's personal drama and his ideas of national revival. Erznkatsi's secular poetry is a philosophical reflection on various aspects of human existence. He was the first Armenian poet to address the theme of emigration. He is the author of the cosmographic work "Poem about Heavenly Ornaments".

Evidence of the high level of poetry development is the work of Konstantin Erznkatsi. Biographical information about him is extremely scarce. He was born around 1250, and according to his own words, he studied in a monastery from the age of fifteen. Erznkatsi is one of the founders of love lyricism in Armenian poetry. The theme of nature occupies an important place in his work. Erznkatsi's works often have a moralizing character. Some poems are presumably autobiographical. In his poetic philosophy, Erznkatsi considered the mystery of poetic creativity as a gift from God. He wrote in Middle Armenian, which was more understandable and contemporary for the people. P. Cowe noted the influence of Sufi poetry, especially Attar's "Conference of the Birds," on his work. According to Valery Bryusov, "Konstantin Erzincaiky was the first among Armenian medieval lyricists to turn to the motifs of love, which subsequently became one of the dominant themes of Armenian poetry". Indirect evidence suggests that in the 1280s he was already a recognized poet.

=== Beginning of the Social Genre: Frik ===
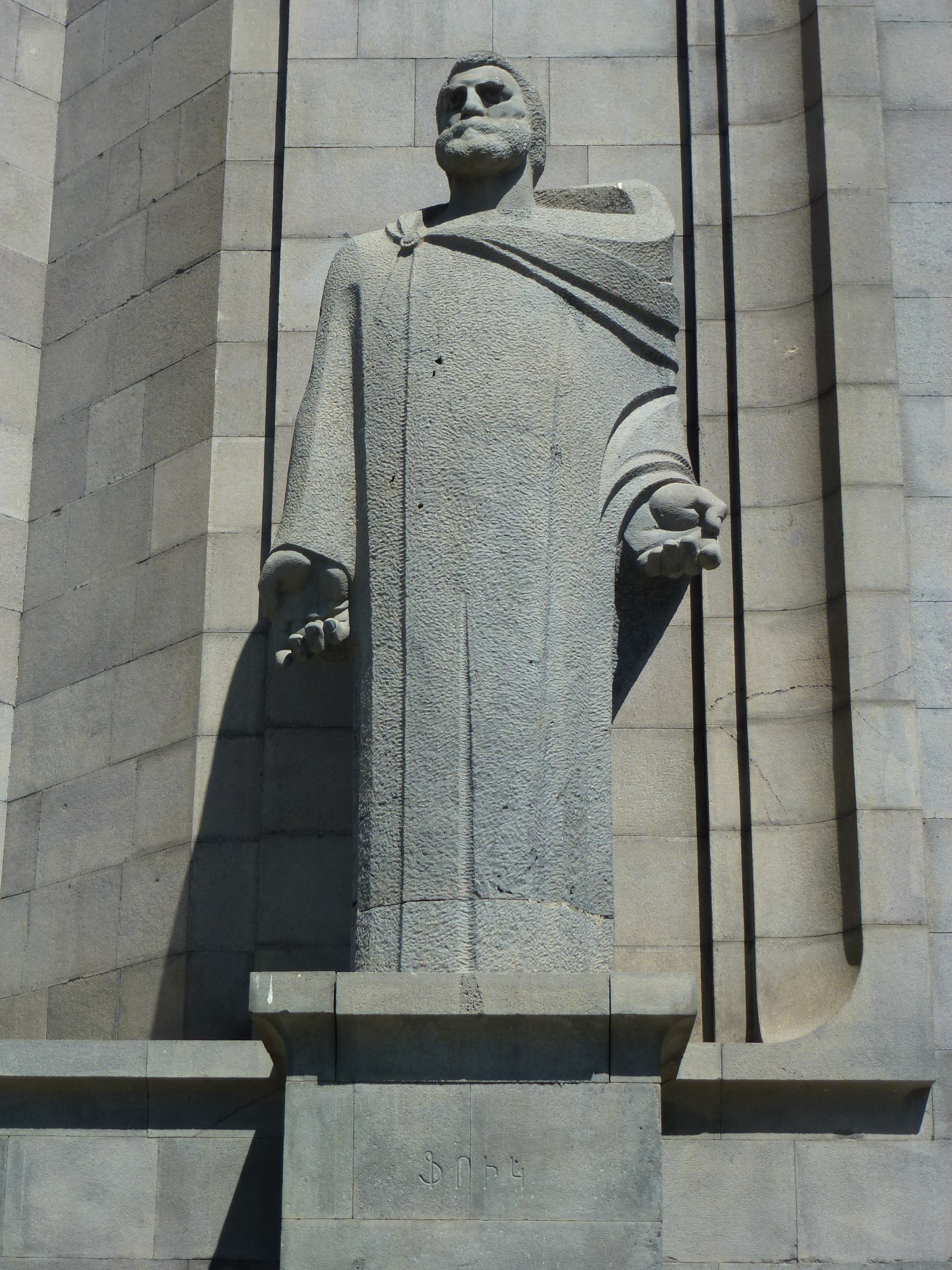
Frik's monument in front of Matenadaran

Frik occupies an important place in the secular poetry of that era. About 50 of his works that have survived to this day reflect the everyday life of Armenia during the period of Mongol rule. Biographical information about Frik is solely gathered from his own poems. The poet was born presumably in the 1230s, probably in Eastern Armenia. From the biographical data, it is known that he lost his family and children and was deprived of his earned wealth. The approximate time of his death was in the 1320s-1330s.

Frik expressed the interests of the oppressed masses. Even in those works where the author touched on themes of death or life upheavals from the perspective of mysticism, there is a common spirit. Frik laid the foundation for a social genre in "Gangat" and other works, recognized as one of the best in Armenian civil poetry. Using various poetic techniques, he demonstrated the contrasts of life, legal, economic, and other forms of inequality between social classes, protesting against national oppression. This is most palpable in the works "Against Falak" (written at the beginning of the reign of Argun Khan), "For Argun Khan and Buga," and "Gangat". His philosophy was often atypical for his time. Although by established tradition he explained his misfortunes as the "fault" of Armenians, Frik argued with God, expressing his protest against injustice. He considered the multinational nature of the world as the main reason for the events happening. The breadth of his views extends beyond Armenian themes; he passionately addressed universal human issues. He advocated for close cooperation among all Christian peoples against common enemies. Dishonesty, immorality, and exploitation were sometimes criticized in the form of satire. Valery Bryusov wrote: "In many ways, Frik's poems can be called satire in the best sense of the word; the poet portrays the negative aspects of life that he observes with bitterness". To withstand life's difficulties, he called for self-improvement, inner purity, and freedom. He continued to write into old age, which he mentioned in one of his works. Frik's language is full of metaphors; the poet deliberately wrote some of his poems in Middle Armenian, occasionally in Grabar. His works were first published in Venice in 1513 in the collection "Tagharan".

=== Patriotic Poem: Stepanos Orbelian, Hovhannes Tlkunatsi and Simeon Aparantsi ===
The outstanding work of that time is considered to be the poem "Lament for st. Katoghike" by Stepanos Orbelian. It was written in 1300 and expresses the patriotic ideas of the author. Orbelian mourns the loss of Armenia's independence and calls on Armenians scattered around the world to return to their homeland, desiring the revival of Greater Armenia as their common Motherland. According to P. Cowe, Orbelian sought to exert psychological pressure on the intellectuals of his time, urging them to return and restore the Armenian state. The work reflects the movement of civil and religious leaders of Armenia to return the residence of the Catholicos from Sis to Etchmiadzin. The author allegorically depicted the Etchmiadzin Cathedral as a "widowed mother mourning the loss of her children", which served as the spiritual center of Armenians.

Hovhannes Tlukrantsi wrote a patriotic poem titled "The Song of the Brave Liparit," dedicated to the hero who died in battle against the Mamluks in 1369. Liparit was a historical figure and a military commander leading Armenian troops. Structurally, the poem "The Song of the Brave Liparit" is a romance depicting the struggle between Cilician Armenia and the Egyptian Sultanate. According to Poghos Khachatrian, Liparit's life was cut short during the reign of King Constantine V. Fighting against the enemies of the homeland, he remained loyal to his own king. The ideological line of the poem is a call to defend the Motherland. The poet calls for unity and condemns treason. Unlike medieval Christian philosophy, Tlukrantsi does not interpret the plot as a result of God's punishment for sins, simultaneously displaying open hostility towards Islam.

Patriotic sentiments were particularly strong in the works of Simeon Aparantsi, the author of the lyrical poem "Lament on the Royal Throne" (1593). He provides a brief overview of Armenian history, from the creation of the world to the Arab conquests of the mid-7th century. Aparantsi was likely inspired by Nerses Shnorhali to write the historical poem "Vipasanutyun". As Camilla Trever wrote, in the elegy dedicated to the pagan temple Garni, he lamented the greatness of ancient Armenia. The poet sometimes resorted to pathetic and rhetorical forms. In one part of the work, for example, he mentally addressed Mesrop Mashtots. Within the framework of Christian solidarity, Aparantsi appeals to sister churches and "united" peoples with a call to mourn the decline of the Armenian people. The poem "Lament on the Throne of King Trdat" is written in simple language, which, it is believed, Simeon pursued certain didactic, commemorative, and patriotic goals. In the poem "On the Capture of Tabriz" (1585), he mentioned the calamities suffered by the Armenians at the hands of the Ottomans. To some extent, however, he expresses satisfaction that the Persians suffered defeat, as in the mid-5th century they were at war with the Armenians.

== Hayrens ==
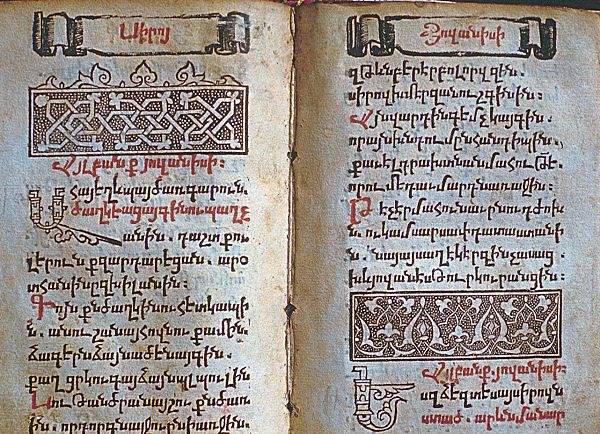
Hakob Meghapart's "Tagharan", the first printed collection of works by Armenian poets, Venice, 1513

Hayrens represented a special genre of medieval Armenian poetry. According to various opinions, the creation of these poems dates back to the XIII-XIV or XIII-XVI centuries. According to Levon Mkrtchyan, the native language, style, and character structure indicate that the genre was perfected by one author who lived no later than the XVI century, probably in the XIII-XIV centuries. According to R. Significant development of the native-born Goshgarians occurred in the 10th century, and in the 16th century, they became a popular poetic form. Levon Mkrtchyan speculated that the movement of Tondrakyan could have influenced the formation of such a non-religious poetic genre. P. Cowe believed that Hayrens could be a reworking of earlier compositions by Gusans.

Most of the approximately 500 Hayrens preserved to this day are anonymous. They have been preserved in oral form among the people, and there are no mentions of their authors, as they entered manuscripts anonymously. The earliest records date back to the 16th century. Hayrens are mainly four-line verses of a love nature, although a large series about "antunis" has also been preserved. The latter often speak of injustice and the vulnerability of life in exile. Since the 16th century, various natives, homeless, have appeared here. The word translates as "homeless," meaning a person far from home. If ordinary natives are characterized by eloquence, then Antunis predominantly exhibit an unnatural style. Asatur Mnatsakanyan divided the natives into the following categories: 1) ritual, 2) loving, 3) protective, 4) moral-instructive. Love poems not only extol the woman as the "object of love" but also reveal her psychological character, describing various emotional states of the lovestruck person. Some Hayrens reach open eroticism. Valery Bryusov, attributing them authority to Kuchak, characterized Hayrens as intimate poetry, the themes of which are presented directly, sometimes with humor. The language is simple, without unnecessary complications. Hayrens are mostly devoted to urban life. Most of them are traditionally attributed to Nahapet Kuchak. This view has been criticized and refuted. Only a few short poems can be reliably attributed to Kuchak.

== Lament ==
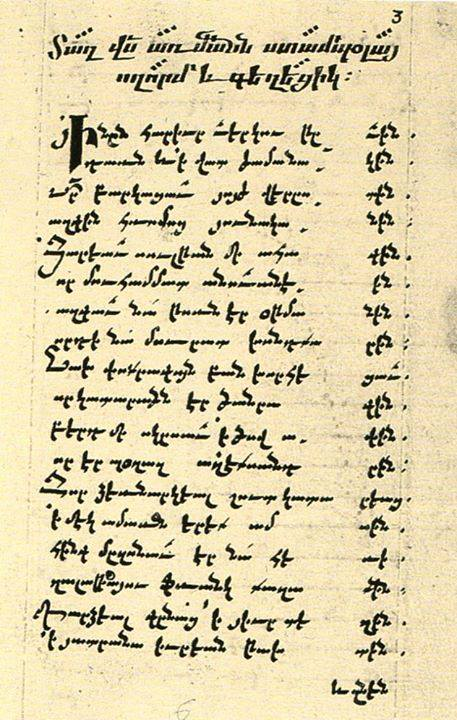
A page from Abraham Ankyuratsi's manuscript "Lamentation over the Conquest of Constantinople"

An important part of the poetic creativity of the 15th-16th centuries consists of historical laments. It became a popular socio-political genre. The literary model for these texts was the biblical lament of Jeremiah. Like Jeremiah, they mentioned guilt as the cause of historical catastrophes. If initially hope was placed in the mercy of God, then from the 12th century, the ideological line acquired a political character. Several Armenian authors of the 13th-15th centuries attempted to define the genre (this question was also raised by Step'anos Syunets'i in the 8th century). The mourning touched not only the life of Armenia but also the Diaspora. The works have both scientific-cognitive and artistic value, distinguished by artistic and ideological levels. According to P. Cowe, the lament genre of church poets often became a method of self-analysis and confession. Poghos Khachaturian divided the historical mourning of the 14th-17th centuries into the following stages: 14th-15th centuries, 16th century, and the beginning of the 17th century. In turn, some philologists divide them into memorial mourning, historical mourning, chronicle mourning, and lyrical mourning. Among the latter, V. Nersisyan lists a number of works by David Saladzortsi, Hakob Jughayetsi, and others. Among such works are "Memories of Disasters" by Grigor Khlatetsi (1422), "Lament for the Fall of Constantinople" by Abraham Ankuratsi (1453), "Lament for the capital of Istanbul" by Arakel Baghishetsi (1453), "Lament for the capital of Kaffa" by Nerses (1475), "Lament for the invasions of Shah Ismail" by Karapet Baghishetsi (1513), "Lament for the children captured and taken to Istanbul" by Tadeos Sebastatsi (1531), "Lament for the Armenians of the land of Olakha" by Minas Tokhatsi (1551–1552), "Lament for the land of Armenia" by Hovannes Mshetsi (1553), "About the capture of Tabriz" by Simeon Aparantsi (1585), and others. Unlike early specimens, laments of the late period were predominantly written by representatives of the lower clergy. Truthfully reflecting historical events, they simultaneously reveal the inner world of the author, his patriotic and personal experiences regarding the fate and future of the people. Memorial poetic inscriptions have been preserved, which also describe the difficult political situation of Armenia. Colophons written in verses were becoming increasingly widespread. One of the authors of such colophons is Step'anos Chmshkatsi, a scribe-poet of the mid-15th century.

== 17-18th Centuries ==
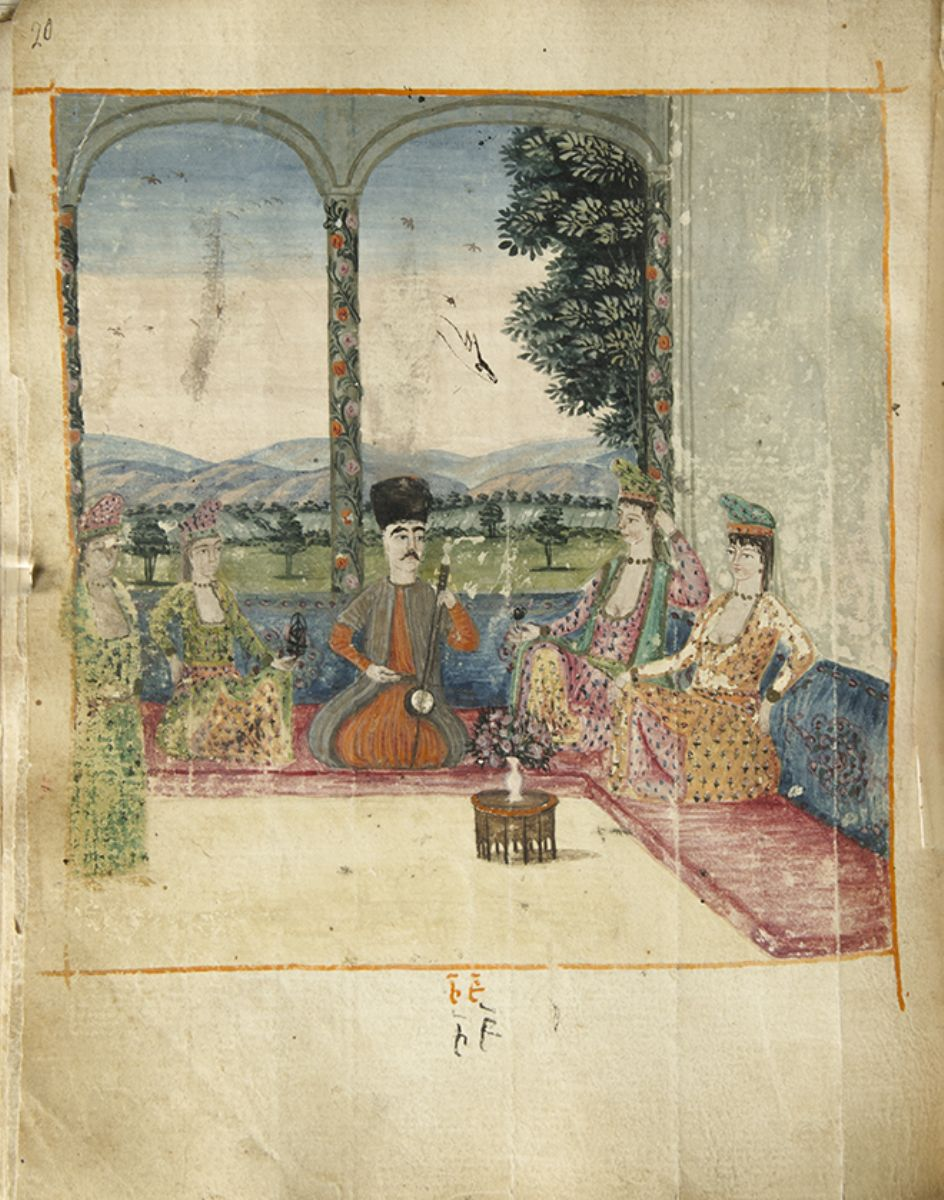
A page from the manuscript of the works of Naghash Hovnatan

The social-political and cultural upheaval that began in the first half of the 17th century also affected literary literature. Alongside the development of the art of copying ancient manuscripts, printing, and folklore, new literary values were created. At the same time, due to the political situation, the changes of the new era slowly penetrated into Armenia. The 17th-18th centuries essentially continued and completed medieval literature. At this time, the ideology of the Armenian national liberation movement and the bourgeois trade was also forming. Lyrics remained the leading literary genre. According to Henrikh Bakhchinyan, the three main directions of its development were religious-patriotic poetry, secular poetry, and folk gusan songs. Despite their unique features, these directions were not strictly differentiated and represented mutual influences within the framework of the unified artistic thinking of that time. Sometimes in the works of one author, one can see different poetic directions of the era. In this sense, the creativity of Martiros Ghrimetsi from "The Armenian Grimoire," combining religious hymns, secular poetry, and pastoral poetry, is characteristic. As noticed by S. La Porta, the opposition between religious and secular literature represents a false dichotomy: "Instead, they should be seen as brothers and sisters sharing one destiny". All dominant tendencies reflected literary continuity with subsequent linguistic-poetic properties, themes, and directions. For example, religious-patriotic poetry repeated and developed a similar medieval tradition. Its language was mainly grabar, sometimes Middle Armenian, and the themes were taken from the Bible or Armenian history. It had enlightenment goals, with the audience mainly being future leaders and enlighteners of the church. In turn, religious-patriotic poetry is divided into three parts: purely religious, national-church, and historical-political. Purely religious poetry lagged behind in its artistic qualities compared to similar medieval works, which was a consequence of the dominance of religious ideals over secular ones in the modern era. However, religious poetry acquired a greater social mission. National-church poetry of the 18th century gained particular weight, synthesizing biblical and Armenian national plots. Historical-political poetry, reflecting the military past and present of the Armenian people, its liberation aspirations, also developed. Most poets of the 17th century were representatives of the common people, which largely determined the ideological aspect of their literature. Secular themes and thematic diversity predominated in literature as a whole.

Religious-patriotic poetry of the 17th-18th centuries was closely intertwined with music. The main genres of classical religious poetry – verse and klada – were revived and developed anew. Laments and poetic narratives were created. They were mainly authored by high-ranking church officials or individuals with religious education. In the 17th century, such individuals were considered to be Nerses Mokatsi, Stepanos, Hakob and Khachatur Tokhatsi, Vardan and Hovhannes Kafatsi, Vrtanes Srnketsi, David Geghametsi, Hovhannes Makvetsi, Eremia Kemyurchyan, and in the 18th century: Simeon Yerevantsi, Paghtasar Dpir, Petros Gapantsi, Hovhannes Beriatsi, Grigor Oshakantsi, Gazar Chakhketsi, Hovannes Karnetsi, and others. Both in Armenia and in the Diaspora, they stood at the forefront of national culture, promoting the idea of national liberation and contributing to the rise of national self-awareness. At the same time, the creativity of each of them differed both in artistic quality and ideological orientation. The prominent figure in religious-patriotic poetry of the 17th century is Eremia Kemyurchyan. Kemyurchyan wrote in various poetic genres and reflected the life of Western Armenians. In the 18th century, in the religious-patriotic genre, Pakhtasar Dpir and Petros Gapantsi wrote, authors of the transition from medieval poetry to classicism. Both preferred to write in Classical Old Armenian. Another direction of lyricism in the 17th-18th centuries, influenced by folk-gusan creativity, returned to medieval secular poetry. Secular poetry was oriented towards the masses, and the authors of such works themselves were representatives of the lower strata of society. Their language was mainly Middle Armenian, rarely Classical Armenian, or dialects, and their themes included love, nature, parties, personal experience, and social life. These works were devoid of allegories and were more direct in expressing emotions, with biblical dogmas being secondary, and the ascetic mood characteristic of the Middle Ages being completely suppressed. Pilgrimage songs and verses about longing for the homeland received new development. These were mostly verses adapted to folk melodies. Satirical, didactic-philosophical, and social sections also saw wide development. Among the poets of this period were Haspek Khachatur, Ghazar Sebastatsi, Stepanos Varagetsi, Kosa Erets, Stepanos Dashtetsi, David Saladzortsi, Naghash Hovnatan, Lukianos Karnetsi, and others, the greatest of whom was Naghash Hovnatan. His love and festive verses were of great importance for the development of secular poetry. Adhering to the traditions of his predecessors and expressing the spirit and aesthetics of the new era, Hovnatan was also associated with the lyrics of Asugh. His work paved the way for the poetry of such a great author as Sayat-Nova. A certain contribution to the development of the poetry of the era was made by the writer-satirist Martiros Ghrimetsi and the lyricist Pakhtasar Dpir.

The third direction of lyrical poetry in the 17th-18th centuries was the folk-gusan songs. Henrikh Bakhchinyan divided it into three conditional branches: folk, folk-gusan, and ashugh. This was closely related to earlier traditions. Based on Armenian folklore and literature, the Asugh work transformed into a new form of ancient gusan art. Armenian troupes wrote in dialects and performed their songs on stringed instruments to their own or traditional music, often performing individually or in groups in front of audience. According to N. Kebranyan, ashugh lyrics initially represented historical themes, but over time, love songs began to prevail. In the 17th-18th centuries, it was the most popular among the people. Experts distinguish three or four missionary schools, all of which were formed on the basis of already existing cultural centers. Teo van Lint wrote about three such schools. One of the earliest was founded in Persia, New Julfa, in the 1640s. The most famous troupe of this school was Gyul Arutin. The Julfa ashughs likely enjoyed the patronage of local merchants – khojas. One formed in Constantinople in the 1730s, and the third in Tiflis in the 18th century. K. Bardakjian considers the development of ashug art as an example of the interaction of Armenian and Islamic cultures. Gul Egaz, Mkrtich, Artin, Rumani, Krchik-Nova, Shamchi Melko, and others were among the prominent groups of that time. Armenian ashugh poetry reached its peak thanks to Sayat-Nova.

The genre of lament continued to develop. There are known works dedicated to the Jalali uprising, which occurred in the late 16th-17th centuries. This period was characterized by a great influence of folklore on poetry. According to N.Kebranyan, the 18th century compensated for the poetic stagnation of the recent past to some extent. The Armenian colonies in Europe, America, and Asia took on much of the task of reviving national culture. Among the poets of that period were Azaria Jugayetsi, Grigor Vanetsi, Azaria Sasnetsi, Hakob Ssetsi, Andreas Artsketsi, Asapov, Sargis Apuchektsi, and others. The "British Encyclopedia" reports: "In the 18th century, there was an Armenian cultural and intellectual renaissance, and in the mid-19th century, it was time for the development of modern Armenian literature".

=== Sayat-Nova ===
Main article Sayat-Nova

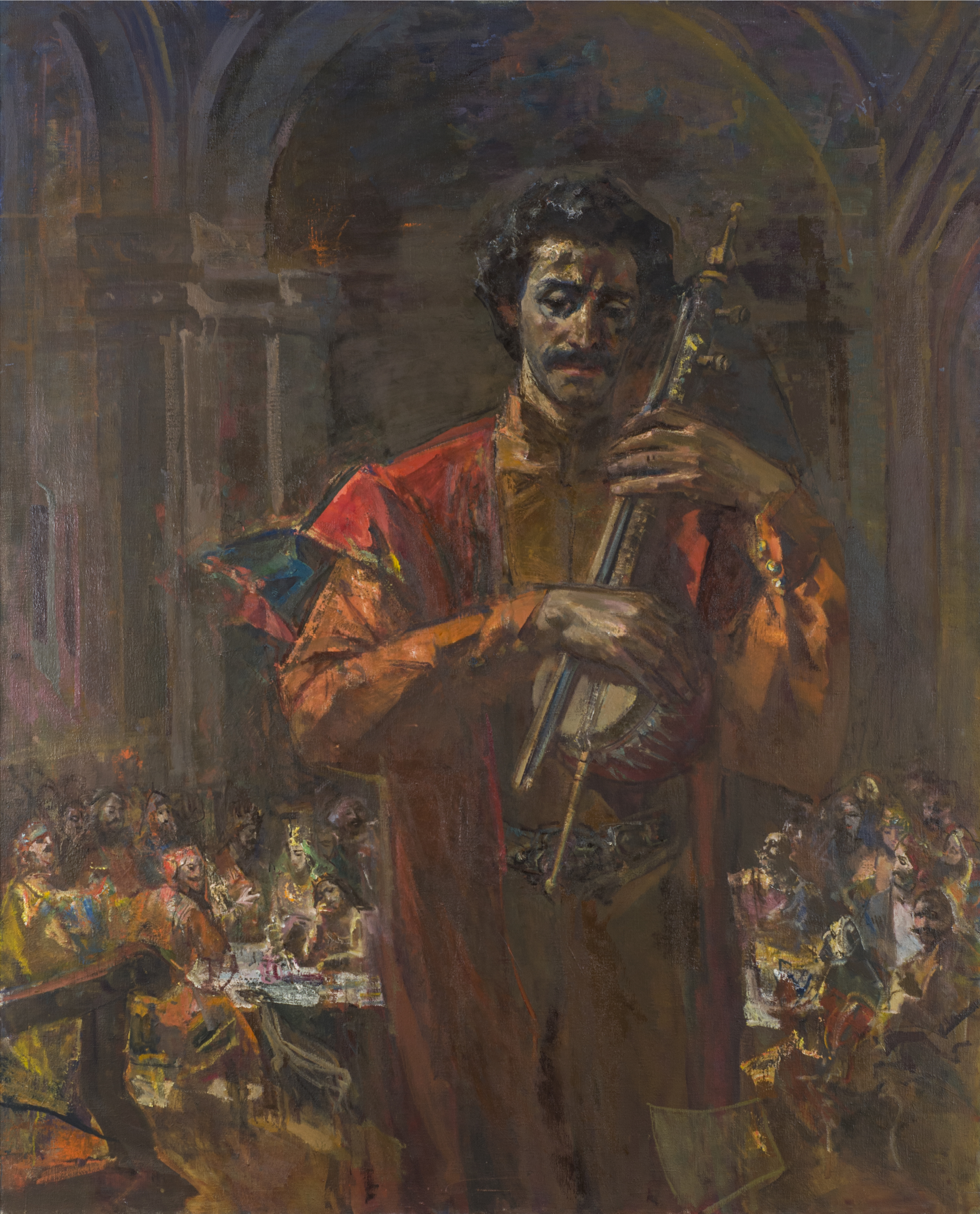
Sayat-Nova, artist: Eduard Isabekyan

Sayat-Nova was the most famous poet of the early Modern Age. Some researchers consider him the last great poet of Armenian medieval times. Sayat-Nova is a pseudonym, his real name was Harutyun (Arutin) Sayadyan. The question of Sayat-Nova's birth date underwent separate and comprehensive research by Paruyr Sevak, who, after studying the available facts, concluded that he was born in 1722. Correcting the examination conducted by Paruyr Sevak and adding new data, now the most reliable year is considered to be 1722, presumably he was born in Tiflis. It is known that he lived for a long time at the court of the Georgian king.

Sayat-Nova's poems are distinguished by extraordinary imagery. Embracing the style of his predecessors, he significantly perfected the art of ashugh. K. Bardakjian noted that the images and literary references presented by Sayat-Nova reflect Armenian and Near Eastern folklore and many common traditions. His descriptive models of the female form resemble the works of poets from the 13th-16th centuries, such as Konstantin Erznkatsi, Hovhanes Tlkurantsi, Grigoris Akhtamartsi, and especially Naghash Hovnatan. Based on the traditions of his predecessors, Sayat-Nova is deeply original; his songs are characterized by depth, immediacy, and dramatic power. Ashug wrote in Armenian, Georgian, and Turkish (Azerbaijani), was influenced by Persian poetry. According to K. Bardakjian, One hundred twenty of Sayat-Nova's poems were written in Azerbaijani, about seventy in Armenian, and about thirty in Georgian. In his texts, "there is not the slightest hint of nationalism". He wrote in a style close to gazelle, skillfully mastering the techniques of harmony, alliteration, repetition, and internal rhyme. In addition to texts, he also composed music for his poems, which he performed himself accompanied by a kemenche. The main theme of his work is love, although he also left philosophical poems. Sayat-Nova himself dated a number of poems from 1742 to 1759. The poet had many followers and imitators, and the Sayat-Nova school was formed. He was killed by the troops of Agha Mohammad Khan in 1795. Together with Naghash Hovnatan, he concluded the medieval period of Armenian poetry.

== See also ==
- Armenian literature
- History of Armenia
