= Kuchak (surname) =

Kuchak (Persian: كوچك) is a Persian surname. Notable people with the name include:

- Hasan Kuchak (1319–1343), Mongol ruler
- Nahapet Kuchak (died 1592), Armenian medieval poet
