= Davtak Kertogh =

Armenian poet

Davtak Kertogh (Old Armenian: Դաւթակ Քերթող, lit. 'Davtak the Poet') was a 7th-century Armenian poet who authored the first known work of Armenian poetry on a secular subject. He is the author of "Elegy on the Death of the Great Prince Jevansher" ("Ołbk῾ i mahn Jewanshiri metsi ishkhani"), dedicated to Juansher, a 7th-century prince of Caucasian Albania who was murdered by a traitor,

The only information that has survived about Davtak comes from the history attributed to Movses Kaghankatvatsi, in which Davtak's elegy for Juansher—his only known work—is recorded. According to Movses, Davtak was a guest at the royal court in Partav, the capital of Caucasian Albania, when Juansher was assassinated (669). This indicates that Davtak was a figure of some renown in Caucasian Albania. Movses praises Davtak, but gives no other details about his life. Theo van Lint concludes that Davtak was a travelling poet who "perform[ed] the function of a court poet" at Juansher's court, and that he may be considered a Christian gusan (bard). He was a Christian, or at least composed a Christian poem. The poem is written in alphabetical acrostic verse. It has been described as "in effect, a pagan lament over a fallen hero." In the elegy, the author shows a familiarity with Greek mythology and the Homeric epic. In van Lint's view, the work represents a merging of the oral and written traditions of Armenian poetry.
