= Hovhannes Erznkatsi =

Armenian writer (1230s–1293)

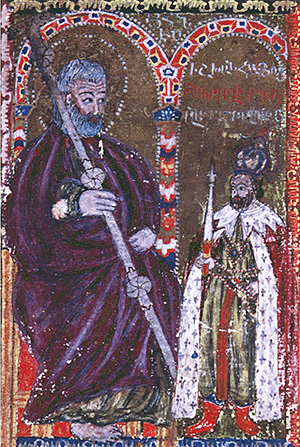
Hovhannes Pluz Yerznkatsi

Hovhannes Erznkatsi (Armenian: Յովհաննէս Երզնկացի — John of Erznka or Erzinjan, about 1230s, Ekeghyats, Upper Armenia, Greater Armenia - 1293, Akner monastery) was an Armenian scholar and philosopher. He was nicknamed Blouz, probably because of his short stature.

== Biography ==
He was born between 1225-1230s, in the Ekeghyats province of Greater Armenia. He was called Yerznkatsi either by the name of his birthplace or because he was educated in famous local monasteries. He was taught by the famous teacher of the time, Vardan Areveltsi, whom he remembers with great gratitude and calls him his spiritual father.

From the 1270s-1280s, the period of active activity of Yerznkatsi begins, he participates in the most vital events of both the scientific and political life of the country, he is not only in Armenia, but also in various cities of Cilicia, enjoying great authority everywhere.

In 1280, he was already the spiritual father of the "brotherhood" organized for the craftsmen and merchants of Yerznka. In 1281, Yerznkatsi went to Theodopolis (Karin) as a special delegate of the Catholicos, then received an order to write a grammar commentary, which he finished in 1291.

An outstanding orator, he was the main speaker on the occasion of the conferring of knighthood on Hetoum and Thoros, sons of King Leon III, which was celebrated at Sis in 1284. Having studied Latin, apparently at an advanced age, he translated certain parts of the Theology of Thomas Aquinas into Armenian.

Yerznaktsi died in 1293․ His burial is summarized in the St. Nshan church in Yerznka. Traditions have been preserved about Yerznkatsi, which connect his name with various miracles. His grave was considered a holy place.

== Literary activity ==
Under the name of Hovhannes Pluz Yerznkatsi, many philosophical, natural scientific, cosmological, grammatical, interpretative, political, theological and other works have reached us, the number of which exceeds a hundred. The works that touch on philosophical, natural scientific and cosmological issues are valuable. Among them, the author not only accepts and defends the existence of the external world, but also emphasizes the necessity of its recognition. He considers wonder to be the basis of world perception and recognition, and the five human senses to be the means.

If Yerznkatsi considered wonder to be the basis of recognition, then movement is the basis of life and existence. According to him, everything is always in motion and changeable. not only the phenomena of nature, but also the contradictions, inequalities and injustices that exist in social life, as well as birth and death, are the result of continuous movement and change. Yerznkatsi explains death scientifically, not by the absence of the soul, but by the decay of the body. For educational purposes, he translated lines from the Iliad and the Odyssey into Armenian, as well as stories related to the biography and works of Homer. He also reverberated to the issues of art, explained musical concepts, characterized spiritual and secular music, the role of music in human life, etc.

== Works ==
The main and key ideas of Yerznkatsi's prose found their emotional expression in his verse. They are secular and religious works - verses, canticles, lamentations, melodies, philosophical and semasiological quatrains. His verse works develop in three main directions - religious, scientific and secular.

Religious works, although at first glance they seem like ordinary poems with only a biblical theme, in reality they also reveal the wavering of the human mind, the multicolor of feelings, the great love of life and nature.

The philosophical perception of life is deep in the secular quarters of Yerznkatsi. Here is man with his uncertain existence, thoughts occupying and tormenting the soul, with the anxiety of death, but also with love and longing to live, with a thirst for wisdom. Secular works are also advices for learning, science, moral education of family and everyday life and virtue. These serve the same purpose: to educate, enlighten the nation, cleanse the society of vices, eliminate the causes of evil: ignorance, illiteracy and bad manners. The admonitions are addressed to almost all classes of society, poor or rich, servant or prince, young, old or child.

The verses that are a praise of science complete the thoughts of the thinking and philosophizing poet. Giving scientific explanations about nature and man, again evoking love and interest in learning and knowledge, Yerznkatsi notes that everything is transitory, temporary, has a beginning and an end, while wisdom is permanent and an inexhaustible source of enjoying the good of the world.

Expanding the boundaries of the admonitive verse, which gained a large volume in the Middle Ages, Yerznkatsi creates a new type of lyricism: a phylosophical, semantic poem, which, receiving a special size and content, reaches its perfection in the form of quatrains. These hayrens, deeply expressing the love of life and the tragedy of death, occupy a special and valuable place in Yerznkatsi's verse. These are not the direct description of the beauties of reality and nature or his impressions and feelings, but thoughts, emotions and judgments arising from them with appropriate philosophical generalizations.

Yerznkatsi placed particular emphasis on the purity, simplicity, and elegance of language. Whether writing in Classical Armenian or Modern Armenian, his style remained refined and graceful, yet clear and accessible, characterized by richness, musicality, vitality, and a consistently poetic quality.
