= Frik =

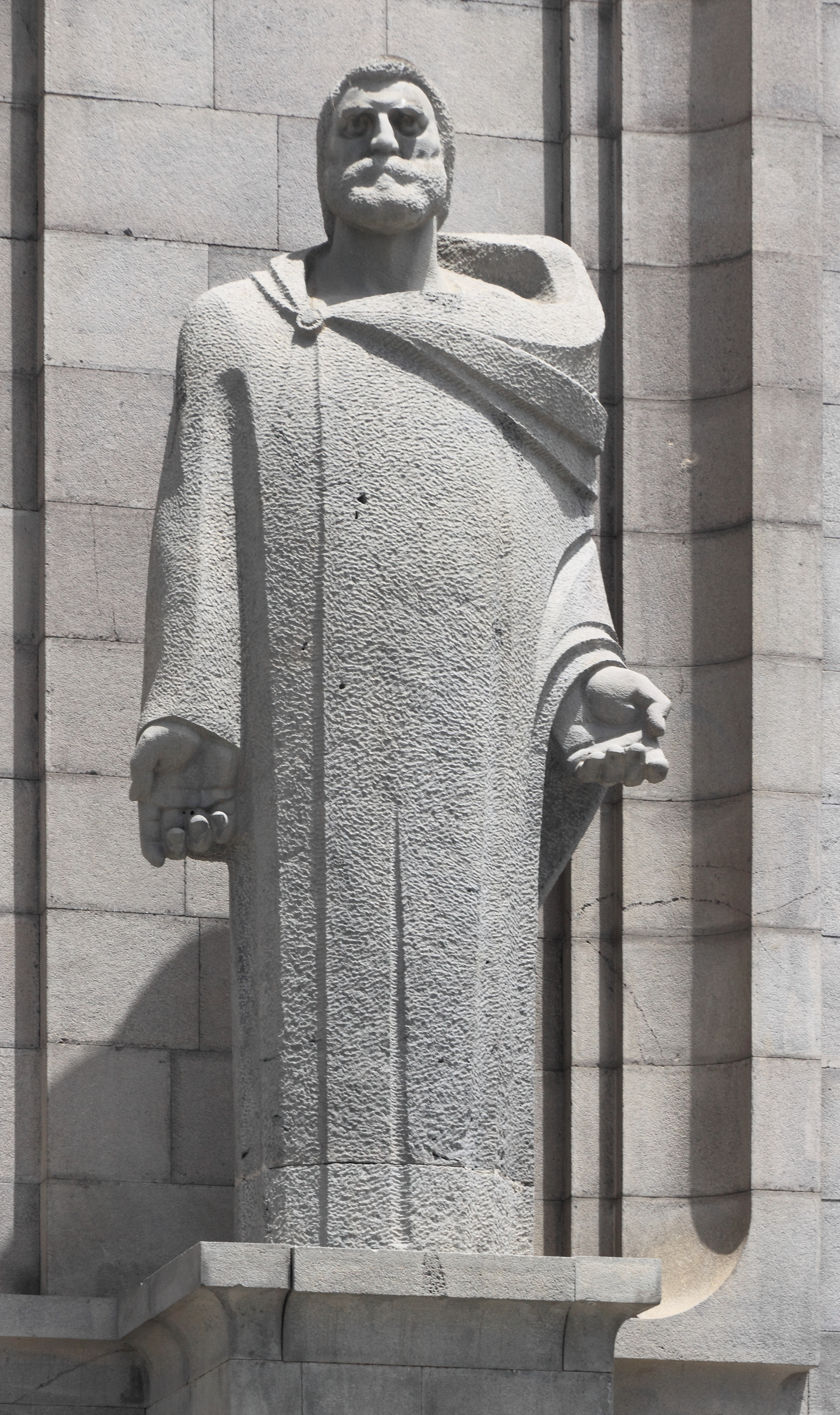
Statue of Frik at Matenadaran

Frik (Armenian: Ֆրիկ) was an Armenian poet of the 13th and 14th centuries. He wrote on both secular and religious topics, and many of his poems are characterized by social criticism. He was the first Armenian poet to compose almost all of his works in the vernacular language (Middle Armenian).

== Biography ==
Frik lived approximately from 1230 to 1310, during the time of Mongol rule over Armenia. Very little is known about his life. It is not known whether his name was really Frik or not. It may be a pseudonym or an abbreviated form of his original name, possibly a shortening of the name Frederik. His father's name was Tagvorshah. The scholar Hakob Zhamkochian considers it likely that Frik was from Western Armenia due to the similarity of his Armenian to the literary language of Cilician Armenia. Based on information and allusions in his poetry, it is believed that Frik was an educated and once wealthy man who was plagued by debts and misfortunes, perhaps due to an unsuccessful business endeavor. Frik's son was kidnapped by Mongols, and he traveled the kingdom searching for his son (alternatively, he was forced to give up his son as security for a debt). Scholars disagree on whether Frik was a layman or a member of the clergy. He spent the last years of his life in a monastery, although it is not known for certain if he became a monk.

== Poetry ==
More than 50 of Frik's poems have survived. He apparently collected them in one book, which was called Frik Girk’ (The Book of Frik). Frik wrote his secular poems in colloquial language, while his religious and other works are written in literary Middle Armenian sprinkled with vernacular and foreign words. He was the first Armenian poet whose works are almost all in Middle Armenian. His writing shows that he had a knowledge of the Bible and other religious texts. It also displays the influence of the famed religious poet Nerses the Gracious. In turn, he is said to have had a great influence on the works of later Armenian poets such as Hovhannes Tlkurantsi, Mkrtich Naghash, and Grigoris Aghtamartsi. Frik's poems were meant to be sung, and some of them are preserved with notes that indicate to which tune they should be sung. His poems were sung by Armenian bards over the course of the medieval period.

Many of Frik's poems contain criticisms of Mongol rule, the wealthy, the clergy, social inequality, injustice, and human vices, sometimes in a satirical manner. A greater number of his poems, however, are on religious and moral topics; Norair Bogharian compares these to sermons. Two of his well-known poems are "Complaint to Christ" ("Gangat") and "Against Fate" ("Ënddem falak’in"). Both express doubts regarding religious faith and questioned the values of those who called themselves Christians and did not act through with their words or beliefs. Frik was a devoted Christian, but his poems contemplate fate and question how a just God could allow so much injustice and misery to exist in the world. As Peter Cowe notes, Soviet scholars regarded the poems "Complaint to Christ" and "Against Fate" as expressing a "novel iconoclastic attitude towards organized religion," but, in reality, this type of poem has a long history in the Judeo-Christian tradition.

Frik remained popular until the 16th century, and interest in him was revived in the second half of the 19th century. The first (incomplete) collection of Frik's poems was published in 1930.
