= Sarkavag Berdaktsi =

Sarkavag Berdaktsi or Berdakatsi (Armenian: Սարգաւագ Բերդակցի, romanized: Sargawag Berdakts’i) was a 16th-century Armenian clergyman (Note: "Sarkavag" means deacon in Armenian.) and composer of taghs.

He was named Berdaktsi after the village of Berdak, where he was born. (It is not known which one of several Armenian villages named Berdak is his place of birth.) He is known for his unique poem "Govasanut’yun khaghogho, bazhaki, aylev vasn urakhut’yan" (Praise of the grape, the cup, and about merriment). (Note: Also known by its incipit "Khaghogh zkez govel piti" (Grape, one must praise you).) The poem is dedicated to wine, where the drink is presented as a divine gift, useful for everyone (from kings to the poor and disabled). The literary scholar Kevork Bardakjian writes:

His subtle and sensitive description in luscious colors brings the grapes to life and adds sparkle to the wine. He too fortifies his reasoning by upholding the religious symbolism of wine, and his poem rejoices in the "cup" (i.e. the chalice with wine consecrated in the Eucharist) that illuminates souls. In these two poems, wine as a sacred symbol and wine as such are equated, since it is earthly wine that is elevated to divine symbolism. If as a spiritual symbol it appeals to and inspires the spirit, then as wine it appeals to the palate and inspires the mind.

"Govasanut’yun khaghogho, bazhaki, aylev vasn urakhut’yan" was already published in 1892, and was translated into French in 1906. The song "Taguhi mi tesa" (I saw a queen) is also sometimes attributed to Berdaktsi.
