= Hovasap Sebastatsi =

16th-century Armenian songwriter

- Born: about 1500/1510; Sebastia, Western Armenia
- Died: about 1564
- Occupations: songwriter, scribe, chronicler
- Father: priest Thaddeus

Hovasap Sebastasi (Armenian: Հովասափ Սեբաստացի; born about 1500, Sebastia – about 1564), 16th century Armenian ashug/gusan, verse teller, writer, testimonial writer. He received his education from his father Thaddeus, who was a churchman, poet and scribe. His father subsequently became a deacon. Following his father, Hovasap began copying manuscripts and writing poems. From Hovasap Sebastasi, we inherited love songs, historical poems, poems, moralistic, as well as spiritual works and bibliographic works that reflect the life of the Armenian people, in particular the population of Western Armenia during the political transitions of medieval Armenia.

Hovasap's compositions are written in colloquial Armenian. His works are characterized by lyrical style and patriotic content and reflect the state of the Armenian people and the political situation of the Ottoman Empire in the 16th century.

In 1535 Hovasap Sebastasi imitated the history of Alexander the Great. At the end of literary works, existing memory testified that he created his love songs with optimism towards his life and nature in 1535. Hovasap Sevastasi wrote a verse of 17 houses, which was dedicated to Kocha Sevastasi, an acrostic poem, with the first letters of each line in its seven verses spelling out the word 'HOVASAP'.

He was also involved in medicine and natural science. He wrote the work "An Excellent Healing Book of Cardinal Moistures". The main source for this work was "The Doctrine of Medicine" and "Unnecessary for the Unlearned" by Amirdovlat Amasiatsi and "The Book of Questions" by Grigor Tatevatsi. In matters of natural science, he adhered to the doctrine of four elements.
