= Terter Yerevantsi =

- Born: c. 1290; Yerevan, Armenia
- Died: c. 1350; Crimea
- Occupation(s): poet, scribe
- Known for: 'Vine, Wine and Philosopher Talking' (poem)

Terter Yerevantsi (Armenian: Տերտեր Երևանցի; c. 1290, Yerevan – c. 1350, Crimea) was a medieval Armenian priest, scribe and poet.

== Biography ==
Terter Yerevantsi was born in Yerevan, Armenia, to the family of an Armenian Apostolic priest Fr. Sargis and his wife Gohar Melik. He studied at the Teghen Monastery (near Bjni) under Vardapet Hakob. In 1330s he left to Crimea through Georgia.

As scribe he copied works of Vardan Aygektsi.

First known poems about Yerevan belong to his pen. He also produced a philosophical poem 'Vine, Wine, and Philosopher Talking' that has rich dramatics. He is the first known poet from Yerevan.
