= Hayren =

Form of Armenian folk poetry

The hayren (Armenian: հայրեն) is an old form of Armenian folk poetry. Hayrens are typically composed of four lines with each of the four lines containing 15 syllables. Each line divides into two half-lines that consist of seven and eight syllables. This form of poetry dates back to medieval Armenia and has been used by various poets and writers throughout history. The content of hayrens can vary, covering topics such as love, satire, or lessons in morality.

== Famous writers ==
Nahapet Kuchak is known as the "father of Armenian hayrens". Kuchak's poems often explore themes of love and nature. His works are considered classics in Armenian literature. Kuchak lived in a time of political turmoil in the 16th century, and a dark age for the Armenian arts. Kuchak's poetry was often seen as a bright light in this dark time, being simple, direct, witty, and lyrical.

Frik is another prominent poet of the same period. Frik was known for his satirical and moral hayrens, in which he often criticized the clergy and the nobility.

Hovhannes Shiraz was a 20th-century Armenian poet who wrote a wide range of poetic forms, including hayrens. His works often revolve around themes of love, patriotism, and Armenian history.

== Examples ==
Sometimes hayrens can be songs. This song, written by Kuchak, is called "Groong" (Crane). It is very well known and still sung today. The crane itself is an allegorical bird in Armenian culture; it is a kind and wise bird that brings good tidings from the homeland.

Where do you come from, crane?
I ache to hear your call,
To know you come from home.
Have you any news at all?

I bless your wings, your eyes.
My heart is torn in two.
The exile's soul all sighs
Waiting for bits of news.

"You are the Light" is a poem written by Kouchak about love.

You are the light, I am the eye.
Without light, the eye is dark.
You are the water, I, the fish.
Without water, the fish will die.

Throw back the fish in a new stream,
Somehow it lives, fights to survive.
But if we are parted, you and I,
Death is less evil, I’d choose to die.
