= Middle Armenian =

Language of the second period in written Armenian

- Cilician Armenian
- Region: Armenian Highlands, Cilicia
- Era: c. 1100 - 1700 AD developed into modern Armenian
- Language family: Indo-European: Middle Armenian
- Writing system: Armenian alphabet

Language codes
- ISO 639-3: axm
- Glottolog: midd1364

Middle Armenian (Armenian: Միջին հայերէն or կիլիկեան հայերէն), also called Cilician Armenian (a term that may also refer to modern dialects), was the second phase of the Armenian language, spoken and written in between the 12th and 18th centuries, after Grabar (classical Armenian) and before Ashkharhabar (modern Armenian).

Classical Armenian was predominantly an inflecting and synthetic language; in Middle Armenian, agglutinative and analytical forms influenced the language. In this respect, Middle Armenian is a transition stage from Old to Modern Armenian.

== Additions ==
The letter օ, based on the Greek letter o, was added during this period. It originally represented the IPA sound /o/ (close-mid back rounded vowel), which developed out of the Classical Armenian diphthong աւ /ɑw/. Today, in the Armenian alphabet, it represents IPA /ↄ/ (open-mid back rounded vowel) and is indistinguishable in most cases from ո. Therefore, in standard orthography, o is only written word-initially (using ո represents the cluster /vↄ/ initially).

The letter ֆ, based on the Greek letter φ, was added during this period. It represents the IPA sound /f/ (voiceless labiodental fricative), which is not a native phoneme in Armenian. However, it was prevalent in borrowed words, making it necessary to use a letter to write it. It is still used in the Armenian alphabet.
