= Hovhannes Tlkurantsi =

Armenian poet (fl. 15th c.)

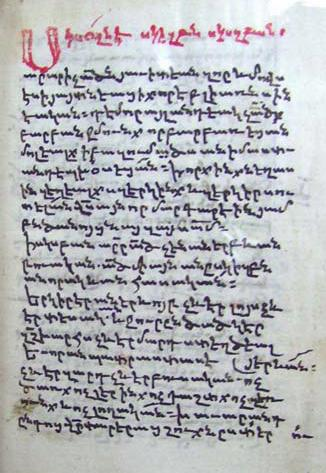
Image of a manuscript of Hovhannes Tlkurantsi

Hovhannes Tlkurantsi (Armenian: Յովհաննէս Թլկուրանցի, romanized: Yovhannēs Tʻlkurancʻi; ca. 1450-1535) was an Armenian poet who noted for his religious and lyric poetry.

== Editions and translations ==
- James R. Russell, Yovhannēs Tʻlkurancʻi and the mediaeval Armenian lyric tradition, Armenian Texts and Studies (Atlanta: Scholars Press, 1987), ISBN 0891309306.
- M. E. Stone, 'Selection from On the Creation of the World by Yovhannēs Tʻlkurancʻi: Translation and Commentary', in Michael Stone, Apocrypha, Pseudepigrapha and Armenian Studies, Orientalia Lovaniensia Analecta, 144 (Leuven: Peeters, 2006), I 147-93 ISBN 9789042916432 (extending and superseding M. E. Stone, “Selections from On the Creation of the World by Yovhannēs T‘lkuranc‘i,” in Literature on Adam and Eve: Collected Essays, ed. by Gary A. Anderson, Michael E. Stone, and Johannes Tromp, SVTP, 15 (Leiden: Brill, 2000), pp. 167–213).

== Literature ==
- James R. Russell. Yovhannēs Tʻlkurantcʻi and the Mediaeval Armenian Lyric Tradition // Armenian Texts and Studies. — Scholars Press, 1987. — Vol. 7.
