= Nahapet Kuchak =

16th century Armenian poet

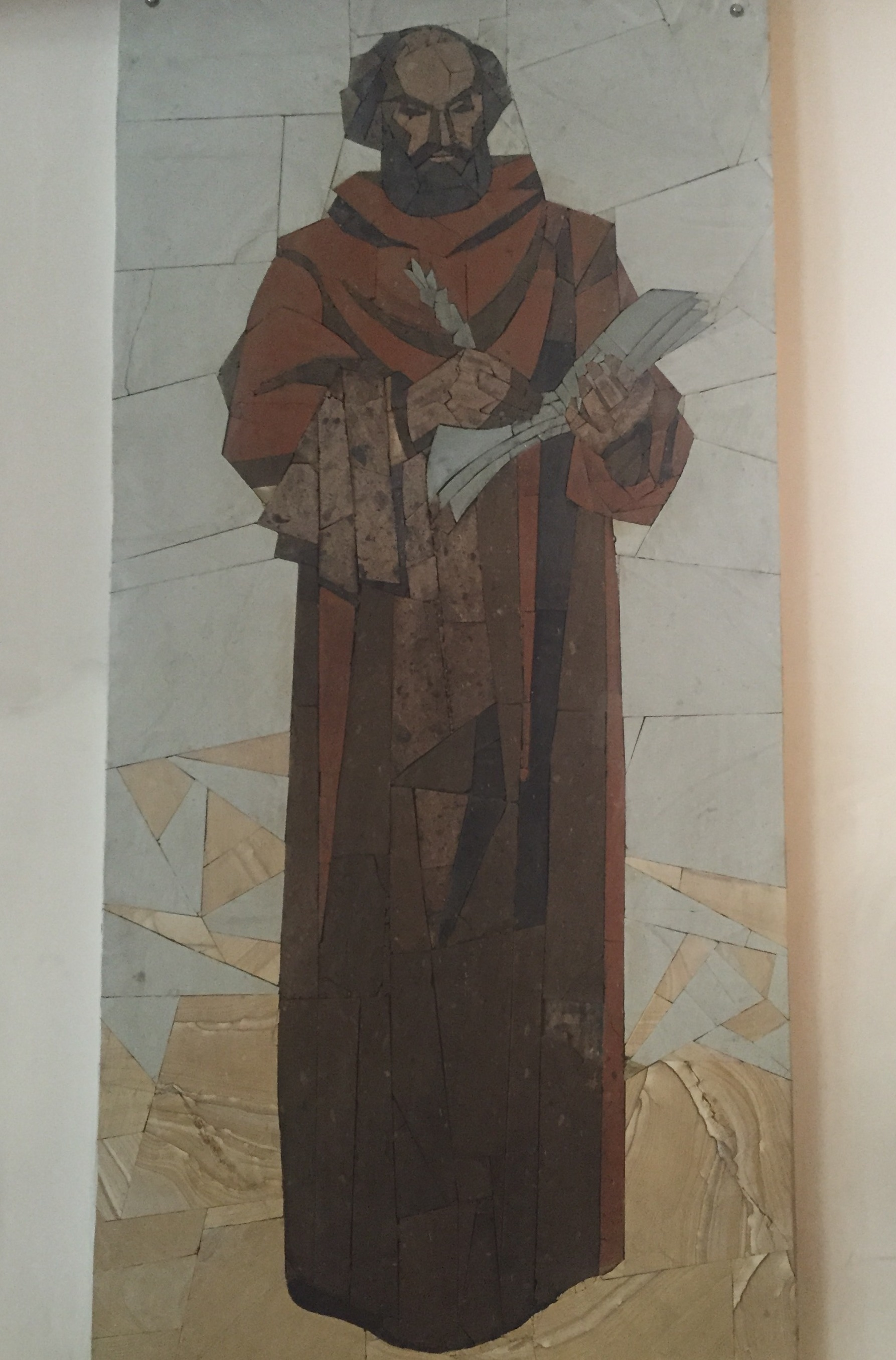
- Died: 1592

Nahapet Kuchak (Kouchak) (Armenian: Նահապետ Քուչակ; died 1592) was an Armenian medieval poet considered one of the first ashughs. He is best known for his hairens (հայրեն), which are "four lines of couplets with a single coherent theme."

== Biography ==
Kuchak was likely born in the village of Kharakonis, near the city of Van. He later married a woman named Tangiatun. The poet lived his entire life near the Lake Van area until his death in 1592. Kuchak was buried in the cemetery of Kharakonis St. Theodoros Church, and his grave became a pilgrimage site. Kuchak wrote hairens (հայրեն), an Armenian style consisting of quatrains in which each line has fifteen syllables and is divided by a caesura into seven and eight syllables. He brought this ancient form of Armenian verse to its pinnacle. Most of his hairens are concerned with love, being earthly and free from any dogmas. But the poet saw the people's suffering and social inequality, grieved for the Armenian exiles (the “hairens of wandering”), and philosophically considered the events and fates of men (the “hairens of meditation”). Democratic and humanistic in its essence, antifeudal in its orientation, the poetry of Kuchak was a challenge to medieval dogmatism. The hairens of Kuchak have been praised by later poets as works of true lyricism and great individual creativity.

My soul left my body,
I sat down to lament:
‘My soul, if you leave me
my life is spent!’
And my soul replied:
‘Where is your wisdom, pray?
When a house is collapsing
why should its master stay?’

The poet Diana Der Hovanessian produced an edition and English translation of his surviving Armenian poems in 1984. The Armenian literary Arshag Chobanian collected and compiled over 400 of Kuchak's poems. Jason Kouchak also translated and sang some of Kuchak's poetry, and more of his work can be heard sung by Lilit Danelian. The composer Cevanne Horrocks-Hopayian set a fragment of Kuchak's poetry for saxophonist Trish Clowes in a song entitled 'Muted lines', which won a British Composer Award.
