= Theo van Lint =

Dutch Armenologist, Calouste Gulbenkian Professor of Armenian Studies

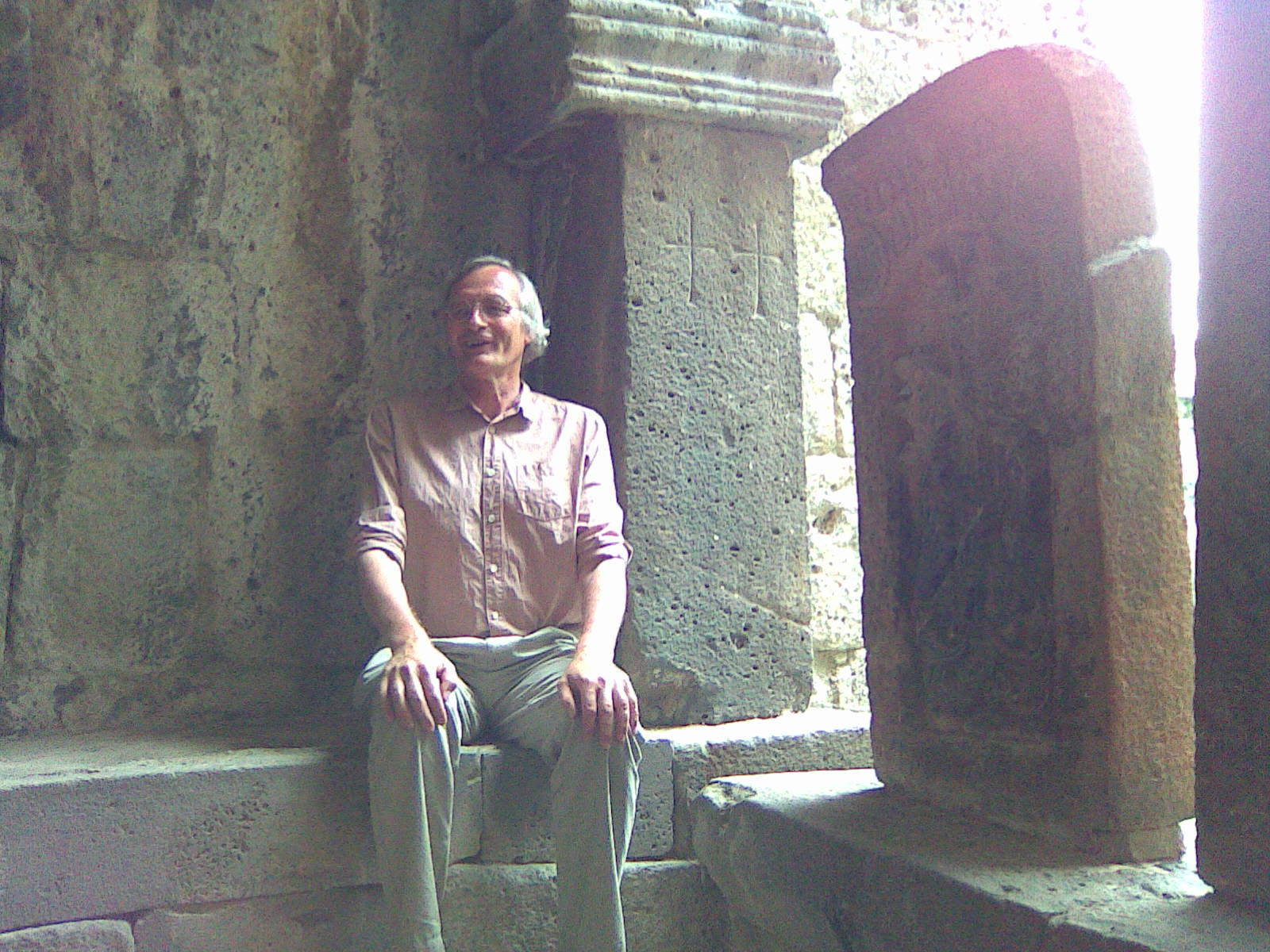
Theo van Lint

Theo Maarten van Lint (born 15 June 1957 in Delft) is a Dutch scholar of Armenian studies. He has been the Calouste Gulbenkian Professor of Armenian Studies at the University of Oxford and a professorial fellow of Pembroke College since 2002. In the past, he has also served as secretary of the International Association for Armenian Studies.

== Academic career ==
Van Lint completed MA degrees in Slavic languages and literatures as well as Indo-European comparative linguistics at the University of Leiden in 1988. Under the supervision of Jos Weitenberg, he completed his Ph.D. at the University of Leiden in 1996 with a thesis on Kostandin of Erznka, an Armenian religious poet of the XIIIth-XIVth century. Armenian text with translation and commentary.

From 1996 to 1999, van Lint was a Research Fellow at the Netherlands Institute for Advanced Study in the Humanities and Social Sciences.

Between 1999 and 2001, he was a researcher at the University of Münster before being called to the chair of Armenian Studies at Oxford, succeeding Robert W. Thomson as Calouste Gulbenkian Professor of Armenian Studies.

== Research ==
Van Lint's current research interests include the letters of Grigor Magistros Pahlavuni, the reception of the throne vision of the prophet Ezekiel in Armenian culture, the Book of Lamentations of Gregory of Narek, and many other aspects of medieval Armenian culture.

In 2015, together with Robin Meyer he co-curated the exhibition Armenia: Masterpieces from an Enduring Culture at the Bodleian Library in Oxford, commemorating the 100th anniversary of the Armenian genocide as well as the 50th anniversary of the Calouste Gulbenkian Chair of Armenian Studies at Oxford University.

== Selected publications ==
- "The Treaty of Turkmenchai, 1828. Russian and Armenian Perceptions", in M. Branch (ed.), Defining Self. Essays on emergent identities in Russia Seventeenth to Nineteenth Centuries (Studia Fennica, Ethnologica 10), Helsinki: Finnish Literature Society 2009, 96-116.
- "The Formation of Armenian Identity in the First Millenium", Church History and Religious Culture, 2009 (vol. 89, 1-3), 251-78.
- "I Mongoli nella poesia armena medievale", Bazmavep 168 no 3-4, 2010, a cura di Marco Bais e Anna Sirinian (publ. 2012), 457-480.
- "Grigor Magistros Pahlawuni: Die armenische Kultur aus der Sicht eines gelehrten Laien des 11. Jahrhunderts", Ostkirchliche Studien 61, 2012, 66-83
- "From Reciting to Writing and Interpretation: Tendencies, Themes, and Demarcations of Armenian Historical Writing", in Sarah Foot and Chase F. Robinson (eds.), The Oxford History of Historical Writing. Volume II, 400-1400. Oxford: Oxford University Press 2012, 180-200.
- "Sacred and Religious Objects", in Sylvie L. Merian, Lucy Ardash, and Edmond Y. Azadian (eds.), A Legacy of Armenian Treasures. Testimony to a People. Southfield, MI: The Alex and Marie Manoogian Museum 2013, 234-289 (with Amy S. Landau)
- "Geometry and Contemplation: The Architecture of Vardan Anec'i's Vision of the Throne-Chariot. Theosis and the Art of Memory in Armenia", in Kevork B. Bardakjian and Sergio La Porta (eds.), The Armenian Apocalyptic Tradition. A Comparative Perspective. Leiden - Boston: Brill 2014, 217-241.
- "Medieval Poetic Texts", in Valentina Calzolari (ed.) with the Collaboration of Michael E. Stone, Armenian Philology in the Modern Era. From Manuscript to Digital Text. Leiden-Boston: Brill 2014, 377-413.
- "Armenian Merchant Patronage of New Julfa's Sacred Spaces", in Mohammad Gharipour (ed.), Sacred Precincts. The Religious Architecture of Non Muslim Communities across the Islamic World, Leiden - Boston: Brill 2014, 308-333. (With Amy Landau)
- Meyer, Robin; van Lint, Theo Maarten (2015). Armenian: Masterpieces from an Enduring Culture. Oxford: Bodleian Library.
