= Tatshat Sahakyan =

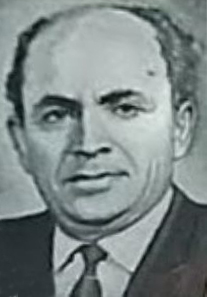
- Born: July 8, 1916; Brnakot
- Died: January 16, 1999 (aged 82); Yerevan

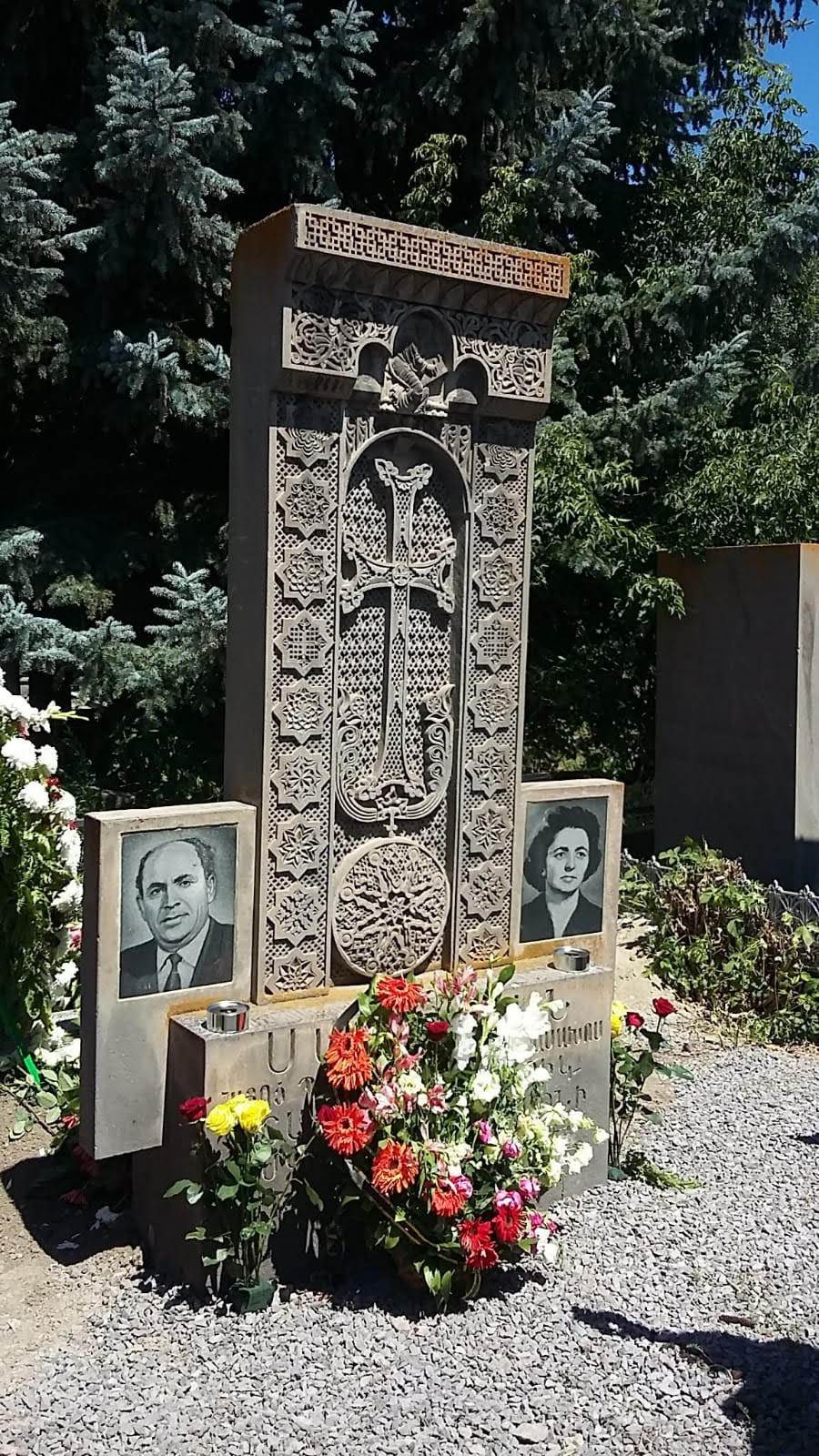
The grave of Tatshat Sahakyan and his wife Knarik Sahakyan, Brnakot

Tatshat Mkrtich Sahakyan (Armenian: Տաճատ Մկրտչի Սահակյան; July 8, 1916 – January 16, 1999) was an Armenian historian, Armenologist, teacher, professor, “Excellence in public education”, Member of the CPSU (1942). Participant of the Great Patriotic War.

== Biography ==
Tatshat Sahakyan was born in 1916 in the region of the village of Brnakot, Sisian. Nicholas Adontz, a relative and Russian Byzantine scholar and Armenologist, also from the village of Brnakot, suggested the baby be named Tatshat, in honor of Tatshat Gntuni, a martyr of the Battle of Avarayr (451).

Little Tatshat lost his father at the age of two. In 1936, he graduated with honors from Sisian Secondary School, and in 1940, also with honors, from the Faculty of History of the Khachatur Abovyan Pedagogical Institute. Tatshat Sahakyan returned to his home village and worked in a secondary school.

In 1940, he was drafted into the Red Army for military service. On the day the war began - June 22, 1941 - the 4th artillery regiment of the Kyiv Special Military District was stationed in the city of Brody, and was attacked by German troops. Sahakyan served in the regiment as deputy political instructor and was wounded in one of the offensives in August 1941. After recovery, he returned to serve in the Transcaucasian Military District – first in Tbilisi, and then, from February 1942, in the rifle regiment of the Armenian division. In 1942, Sahakyan joined the Communist Party. In September 1942, he took part in battles in the Tuapse region as part of the 408th Armenian division. He was wounded in one of the fierce battles that took place in the Tuapse–Goykh region and in the Ostrovsky Gorge, and following treatment he was demobilized. He was awarded Order of the Patriotic War, 1st degree, medals “For Courage”, “For Victory over Germany in the Great Patriotic War of 1941–1945”, as well as the badge of “Excellence in Public Education” and the diploma of the Chairman of the Supreme Council of the Armenian SSR.

In the 1943–1944 academic year, Tatshat Sahakyan began teaching History and German in the secondary school of his native village of Brnakot. In September 1944, he entered postgraduate school at the Khachatur Abovyan Pedagogical Institute in Yerevan, and worked in the Department of History of the Armenian People.

In 1949, he defended his thesis on the topic “The Kingdom of Syunik” and received the academic degree of Candidate of Historical Sciences, and in 1956 he was awarded the title of Associate Professor.

For 50 years, he taught a special course on the history of the Armenian people at the Faculty of History and Philology of the Khachatur Abovyan Pedagogical Institute.

On November 29, 1991, taking into account his many years of fruitful scientific and pedagogical activity, the Department of History of the Armenian People awarded him the title of Professor.

Tatshat Sahakyan was engaged in active social activities. He gave lectures, scientific reports, spoke about the latest achievements of Armenian studies in various institutions and enterprises of Armenia.

He died on January 16, 1999, in Yerevan. He was buried in his native village of Brnakot. At his request, a poetic line from the Armenian writer Raffi is engraved on the tombstone: “Will the time ever come?” (Armenian: “Արդյո՞ք գալու է մի օր ժամանակ…”).

== Family ==
Wife – Knarik Sahakyan (1922–2020), chemist, teacher.

Children

- Ashot Sahakyan (1947), architect, member of the Union of Architects of the USSR.
- Vahan Sahakyan (1949), cybernetics engineer.
- Hasmik Sahakyan (1953), philologist.
- Sahakanush Sahakyan (1960), philologist, translator, film producer, journalist.

== Works ==
Historian Tatshat Sahakyan is the author of a number of scientific articles and treatises

- "Syunik in the 13th–15th centuries."
- "The role of the nakharars (hereditary principality in early medieval Armenia) of Syunik during the reign of the Arsacids."
- “Syunik during the Marzpan period” (also known as Sasanian Armenia).
- "The Fall of the Arsacid Kingdom."
- “The ideology of the Armenian national liberation movement Raffi”.
- "Armenian liberation war 481–484".
- "Restoration of state independence of Armenia in the last quarter of the 9th century."
- "The foundation of the Syunik kingdom and its political role in the 11th century."
- “Armenia and Armenian culture through the eyes of famous people of the world.”
- “The progressive significance of the unification of Eastern Armenia with Russia”.

Tatshat Sahakyan’s scientific work “The Peasant Revolt in Syunik in the 10th Century” was published in French in Paris in 1964.

== Awards ==
- Order of the Patriotic War, 1st degree (1985)
- Medal “For Courage”
- Medal "For the victory over Germany in the Great Patriotic War of 1941–1945"
- Badge of “Excellence in Public Education”
- Diploma of the Chairman of the Supreme Council of the Armenian SSR
- Medal named Khachatur Abovyan

== Memory ==
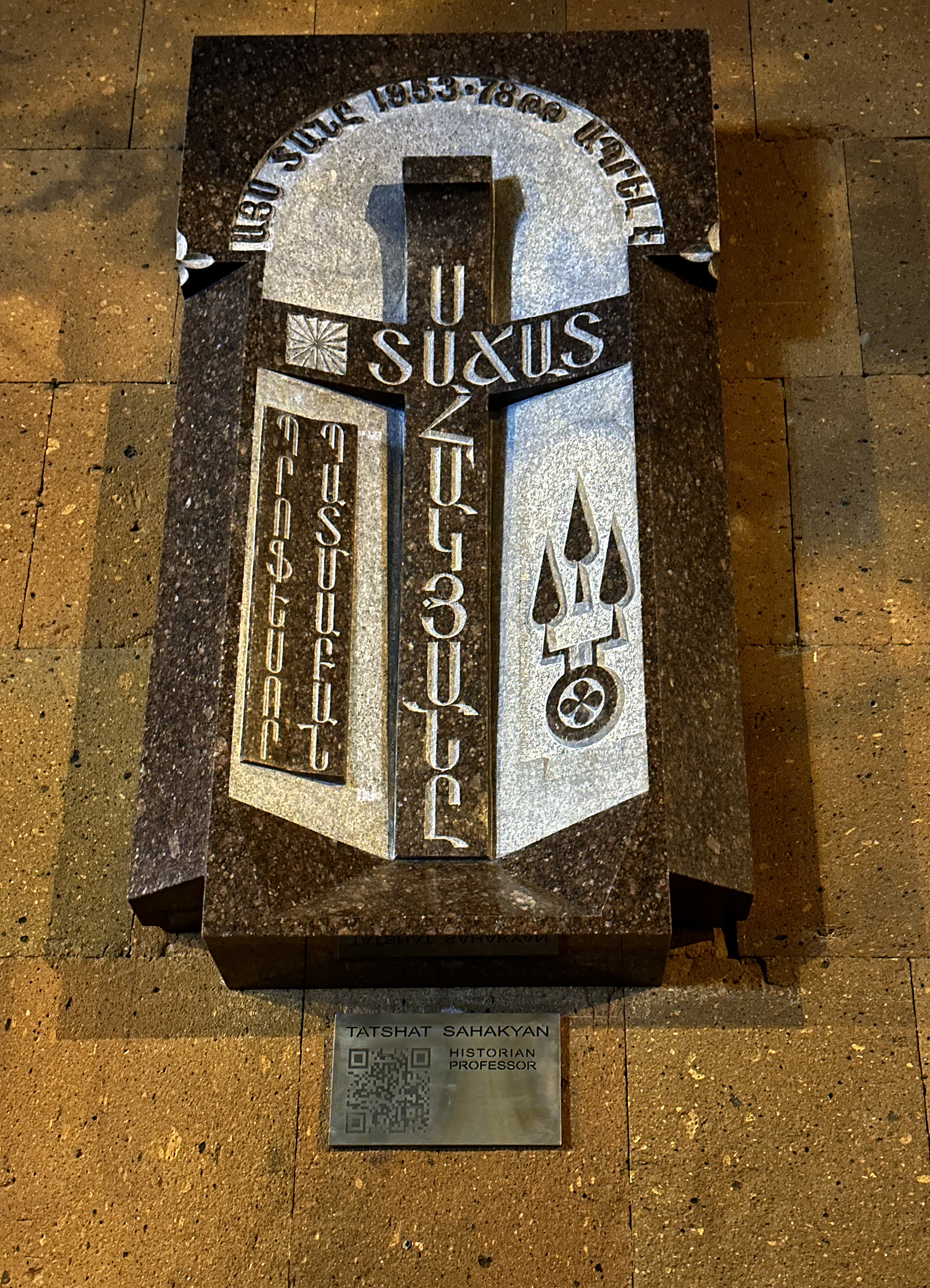
Memorial plaque on the wall of the building at the address: Yerevan, Surb Grigor Lusavorich street, 17

On September 30, 2023, based on the Decision of the Council of Elders of the Yerevan City Hall dated May 24, 2022, No. 587-A “On the installation of memorial plaques,” a memorial plaque was installed on the wall of the building at 17 Surb Grigor Lusavorich Street.

The author of the memorial plaque is architect Ashot Sahakyan, member of the Union of Architects of the USSR (NGO “ArmAuthor”, No. 08/5830, 02/03/2022), sculptor Kamsar Vardanyan, master masons Narek Vardanyan and Arthur Vardanyan.
