= Ardvi =

Village in Lori, Armenia

Ardvi Արդվի
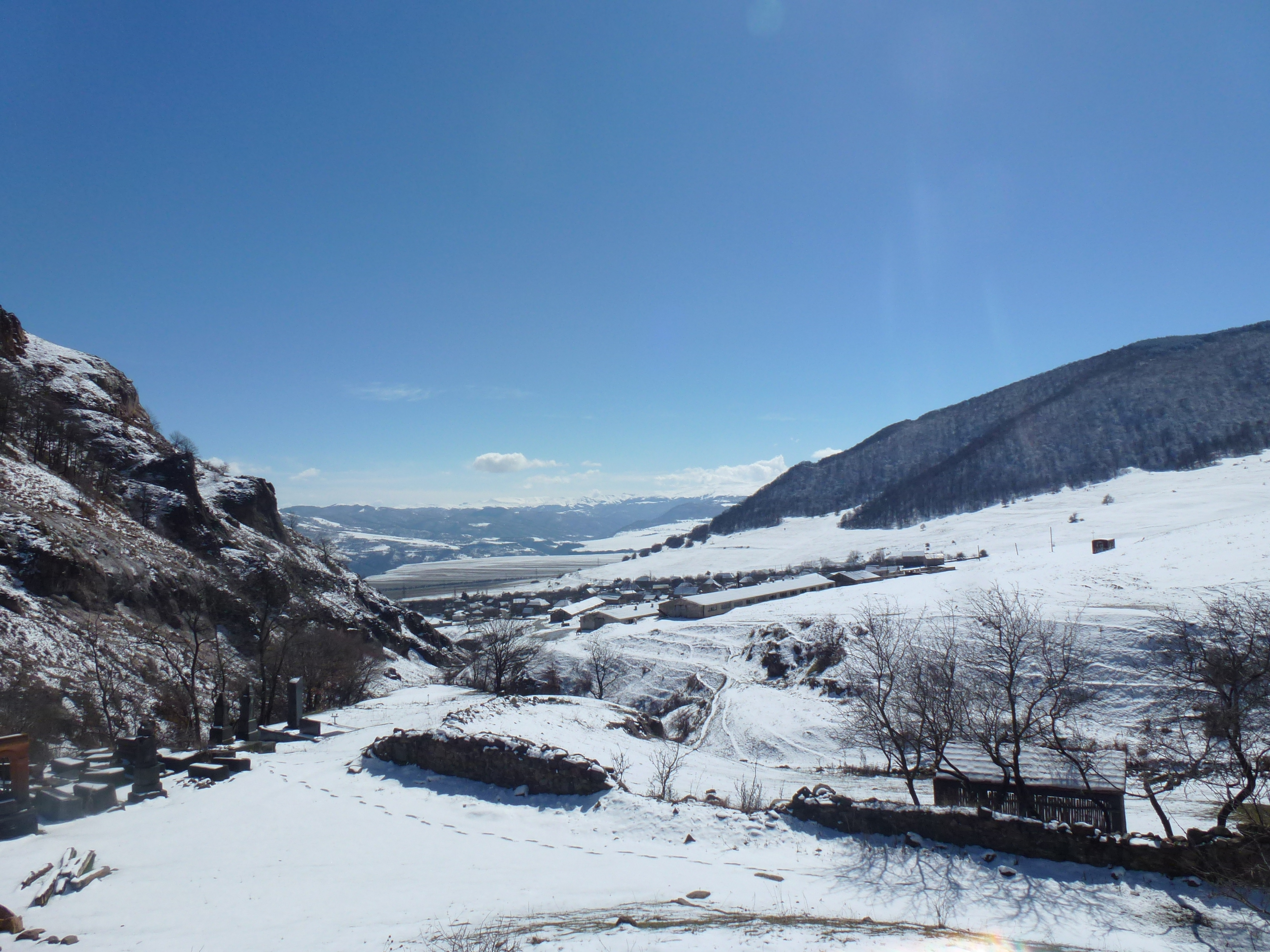
- Ardvi in March 2015

- Location within Armenia
- Coordinates: 41°01′N 44°36′E
- Country: Armenia
- Province: Lori
- Elevation: 1,450 m (4,760 ft)

Population (2011)
  - Total: 177
- Time zone: UTC+4 (AMT)

Ardvi (Armenian: Արդվի) is a village in the Lori Province of Armenia.

== Gallery ==
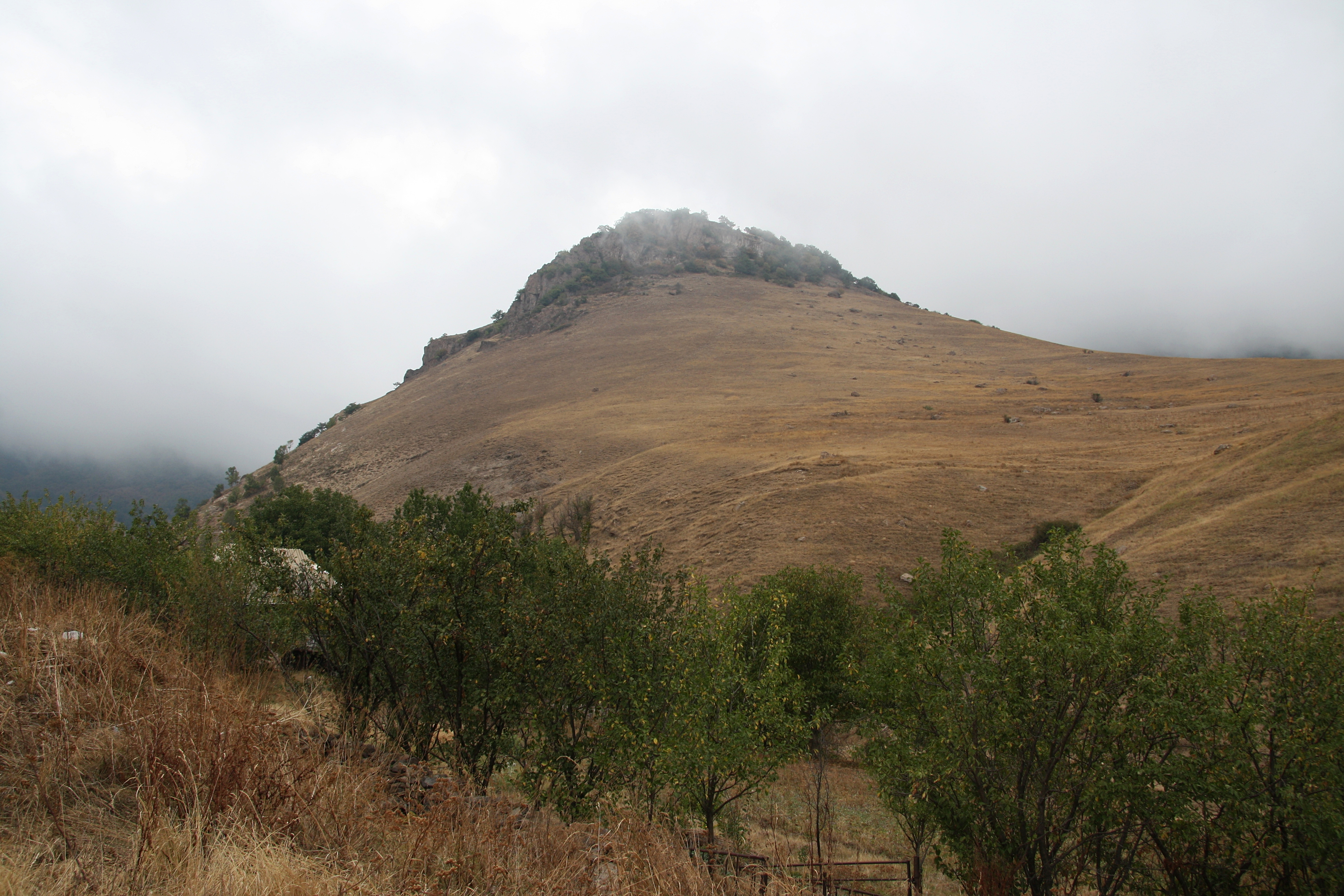

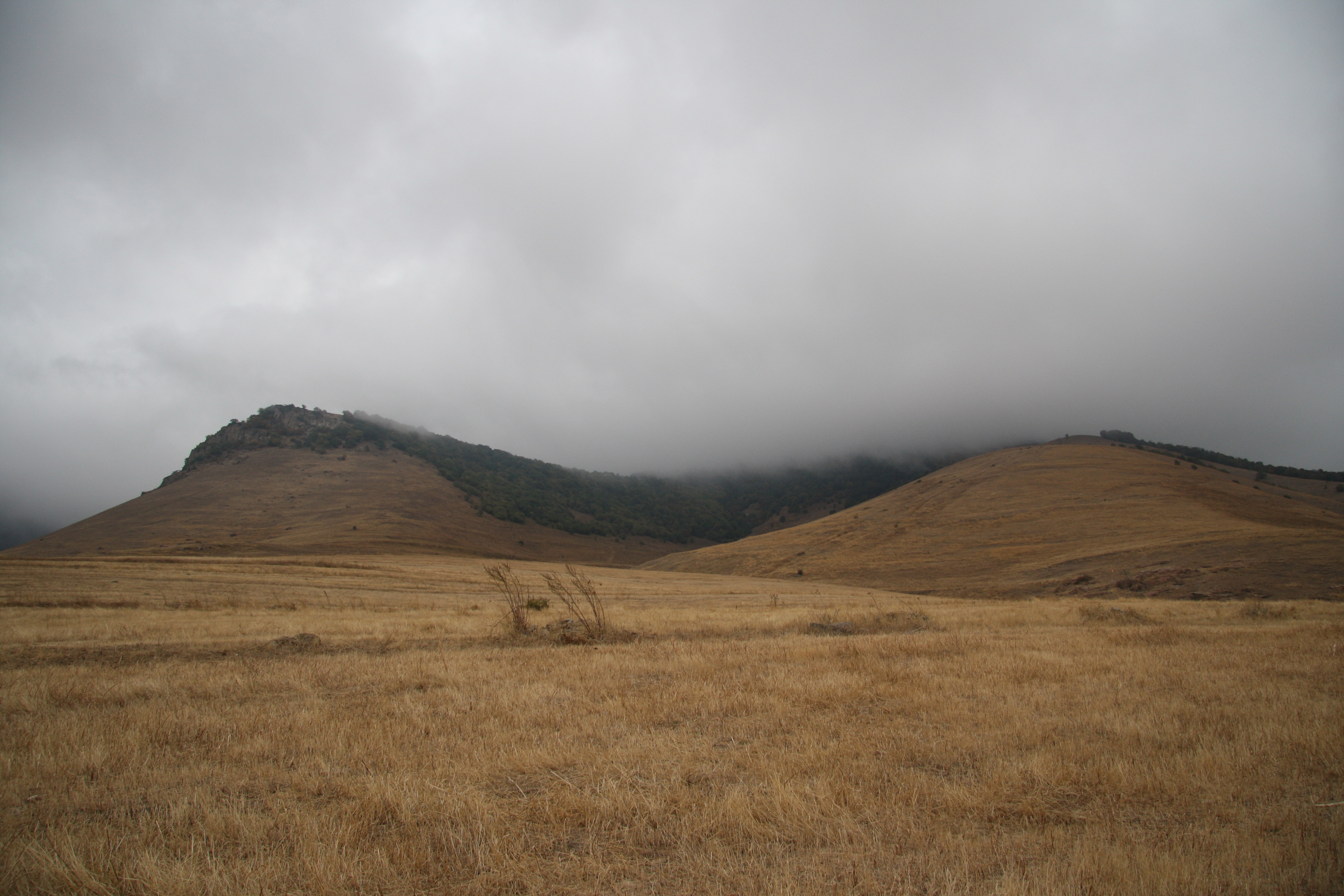

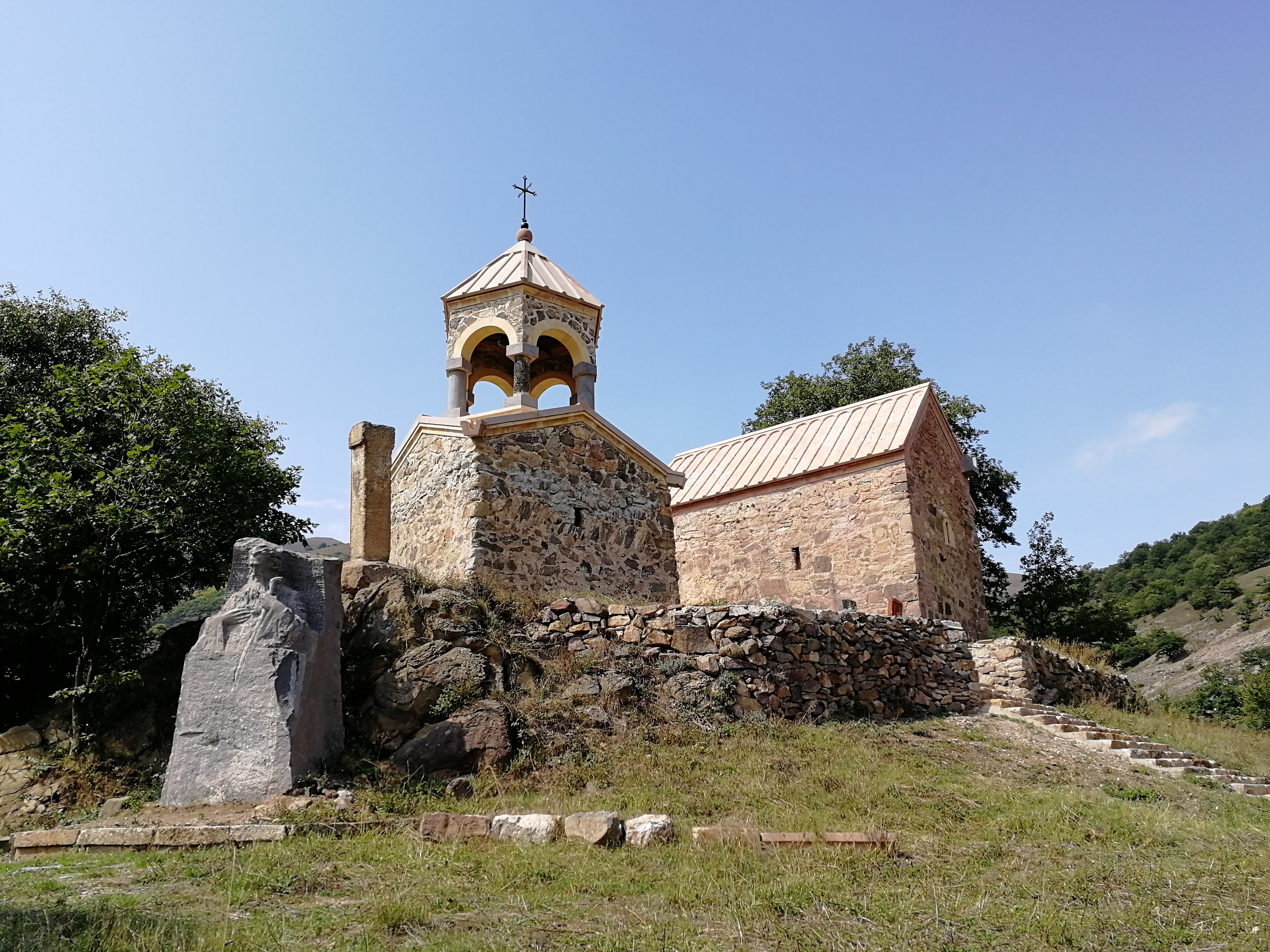

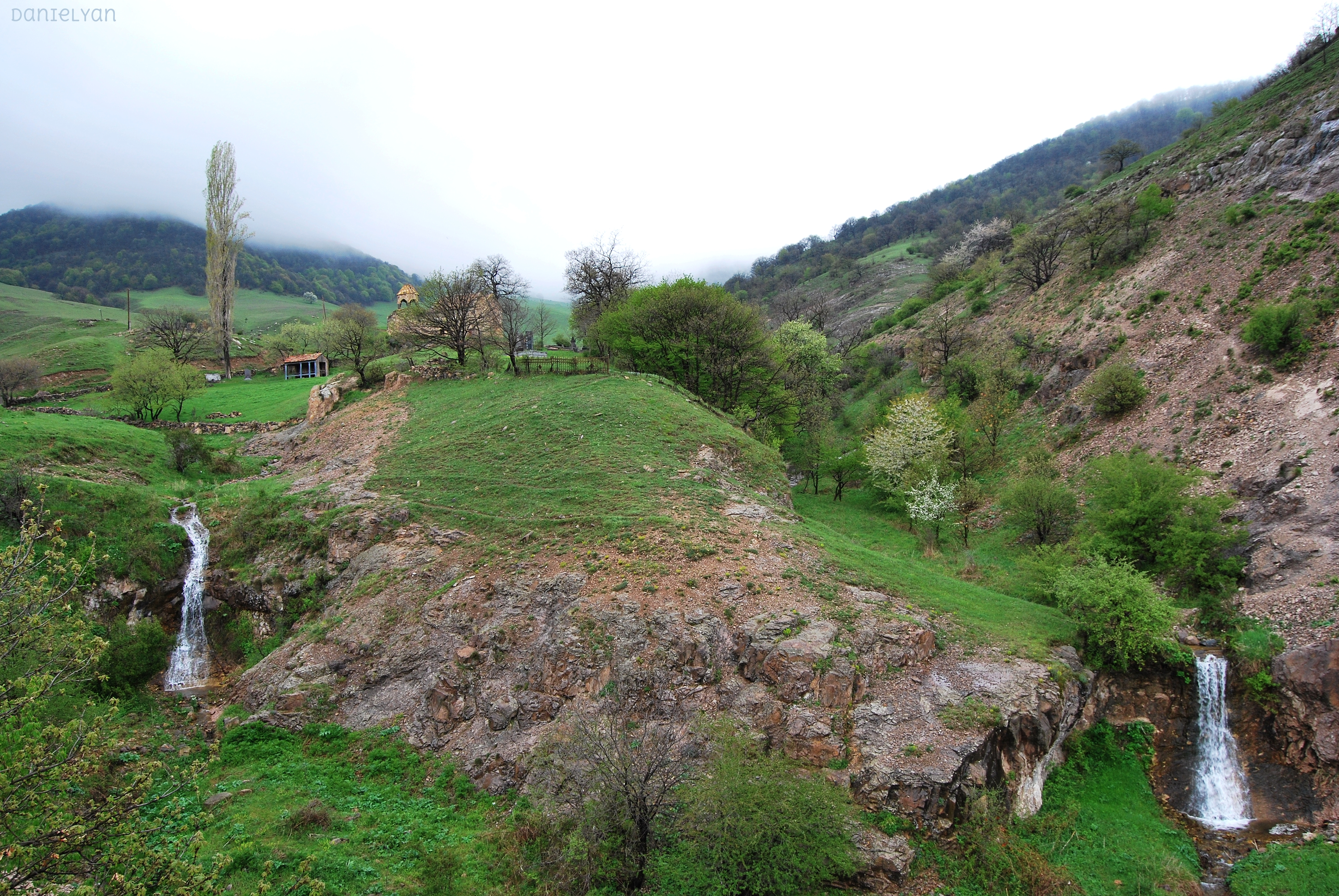

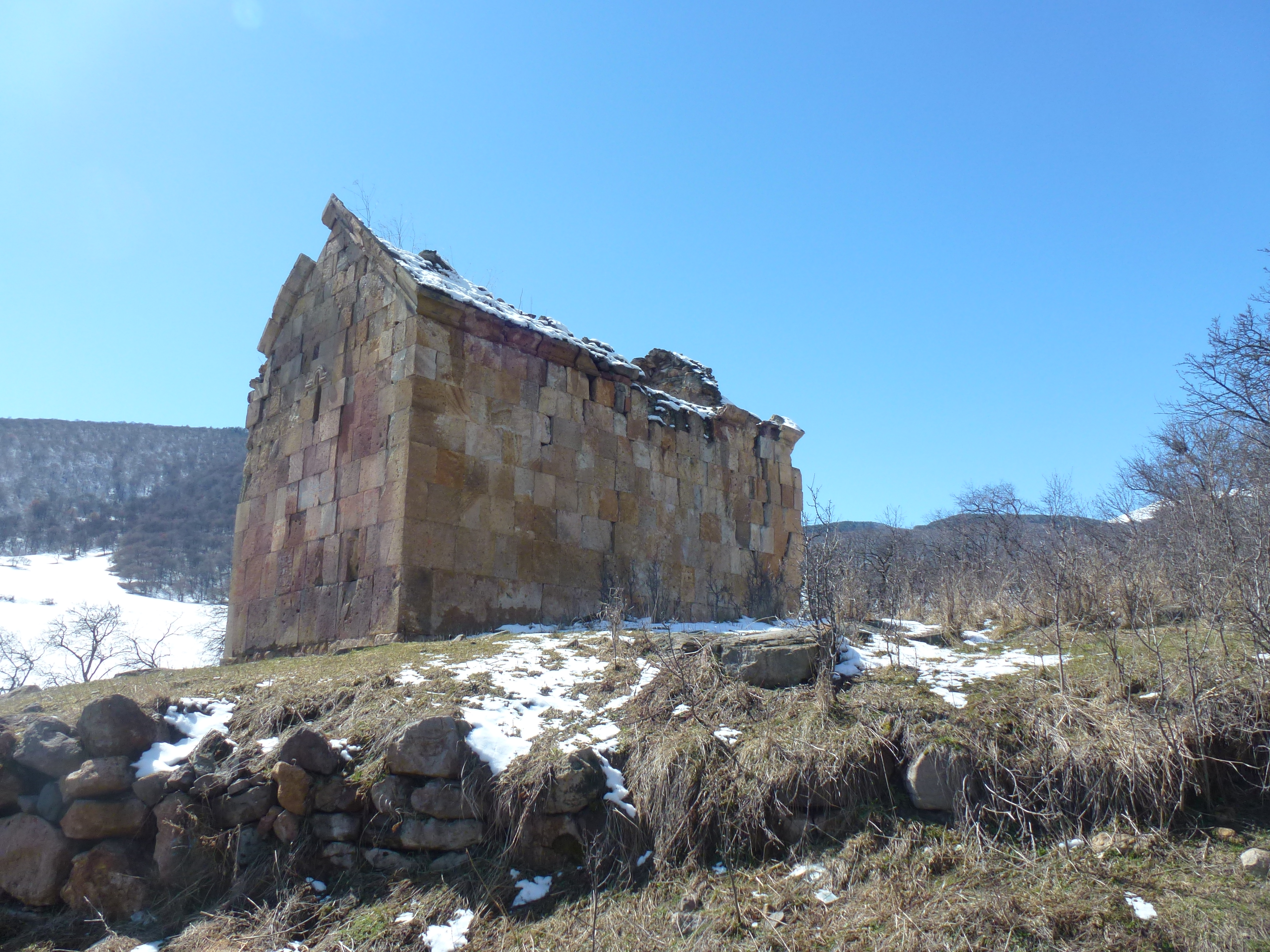

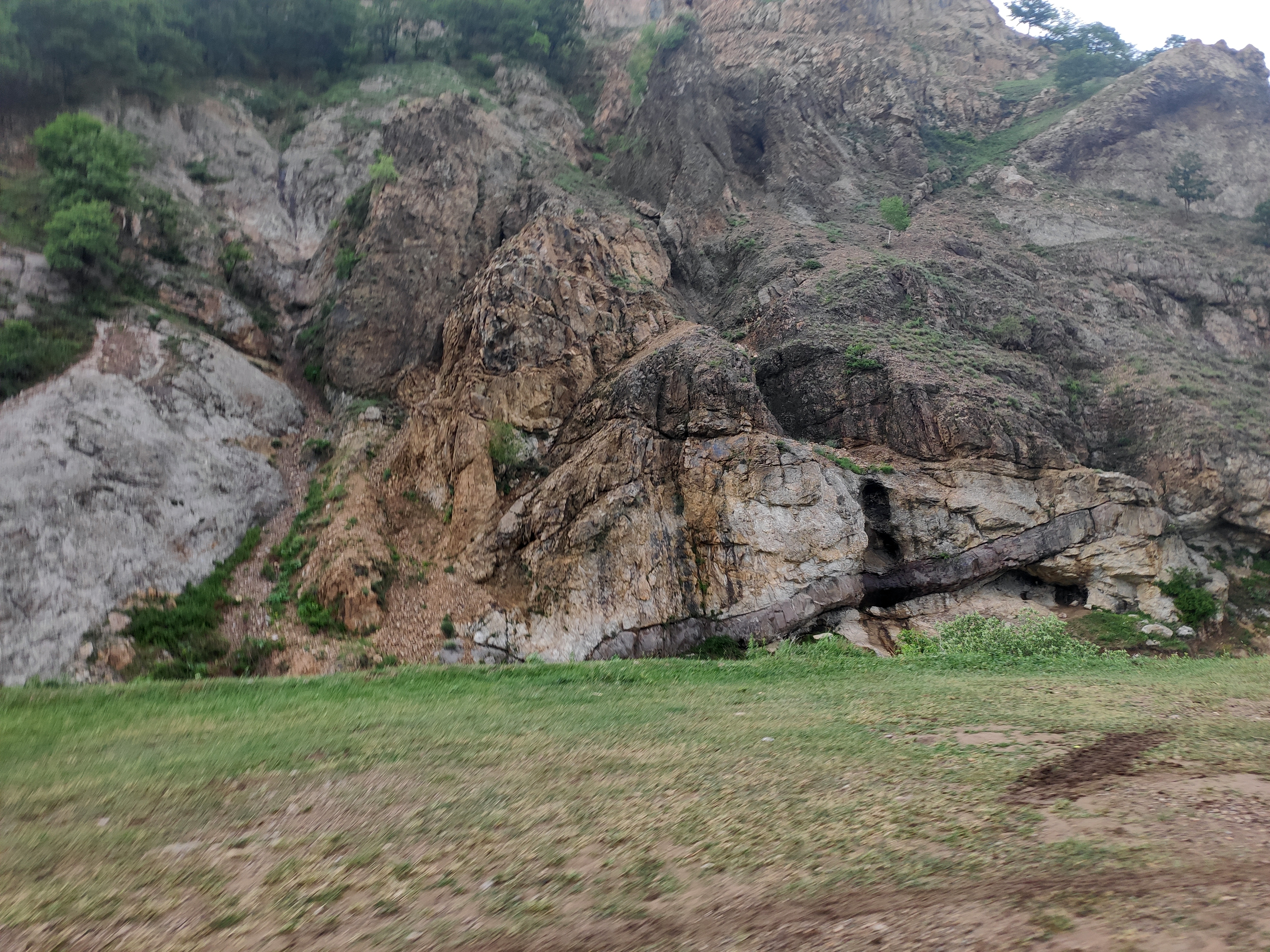

== Notable people ==
- Ashkharbek Kalantar (1884–1942), Armenian historian and archaeologist
