= Ashkharbek Kalantar =

Armenian historian (1884–1942)

- Աշխարհբեկ Լոռիս-Մելիք Քալանթար
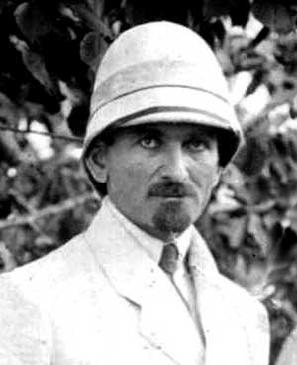
- Kalantar in 1926
- Born: February 11, 1884; Ardvi
- Disappeared: March 19, 1938 (aged 54); Yerevan
- Died: 1942 (aged 57–58); Soviet Union
- Education: St. Petersburg University (1911)
- Occupations: archaeologist, historian
- Known for: Founding Yerevan State University, victim of the Great Purge

Ashkharbek Kalantar (Armenian: Աշխարհբեկ Լոռիս-Մելիք Քալանթար; February 11, 1884 – June 1942) was an Armenian archaeologist and historian who played an important role in the founding of archaeology in Armenia.

Born into the Armenian noble families of Loris-Melikov and Arghutians, he graduated St. Petersburg University in 1911 under Nicholas Marr. He was appointed a Fellow of the Archaeological Institute, of Imperial Russian Archaeological Society and the keeper of the Asiatic Museum in St. Petersburg. He was one of the founders of Yerevan State University. Ashkharbek Kalantar authored more than 80 scholarly articles.

== Early life ==
Ashkharbek Kalantar was born in Ardvi (in the modern-day Lori Province of Armenia) on February 11, 1884. He received his early education at the Nersisian School in Tiflis, graduating from there in 1903. He continued his studies at the St. Petersburg University with Nicholas Marr as his teacher. He terminated his studies in 1911 to become a member of the archaeological society of the University.

== Excavations at Ani ==
As a student, Kalantar in 1907 participated the archaeological excavations of Nicholas Marr in the Armenian medieval capital Ani. In 1914 he was appointed the head of the 13th Ani Archaeological excavation campaign. In 1918 he organized the evacuation of about 6000 items from the Ani Museum, which are currently in History Museum of Armenia in Yerevan. He was the last archaeologist to describe monuments, mostly in Ani region, which did not survive after the 1920s.

In 2013 an international expedition repeated Kalantar's expedition of August–September 1920 to document the current - often desperate - situation of ten or more monuments of Ani region (Alaman, Arjo-Arij, Bagaran, Khtskonk, Mren, etc.).

Ashkharbek Kalantar c. 1910

== Ancient irrigation systems and Urartian inscriptions ==
In 1910s Kalantar studied the ancient monuments in the Lori and Surmali regions, the basilica in Zor, headed the excavations in medieval monastery Vanstan (Imirzek) in Armenia and revealed its epigraphic materials. In 1917 with Nicholas Adontz he participated the II Van Archaeological expedition and studied the Urartian inscriptions there.

From 1920 to the 1930s he revealed the existence of a pre-Urartian irrigation system on Mt. Aragats and Geghama range in Armenia, discovered vishaps (stone monuments) there, studied their rock-carved figures, and published articles on the Urartian inscriptions found in Armenia.

== Founding of the Yerevan State University and of the Commission of Ancient Monuments ==
In 1918 and 1919 he lectured in Transcaucasian university in Tiflis, in 1919 he becomes one of seven founding members of the Yerevan State University, the founder of the chair of archaeology and oriental studies.

With architect Alexander Tamanian and painter Martiros Saryan he was one of founders of the Commission of Ancient Monuments in Armenia. During 1920-1938 he organized over 30 expeditions in Armenia.

In 1931 Kalantar directed the excavations in Old Vagharshapat. In 1930s with Alexander Tamanian acted to save the two basilica churches, Katoghike and Poghos-Petros in Yerevan (both were finally destroyed by the ruling regime).

In 1935 Kalantar was appointed as the member of the Council of Armenian branch of Soviet Academy of Sciences.

== Publications ==
Ashkharbek Kalantar authored over 80 articles. The English translations of his selected works were published in 3 volumes in 1994, 1999, 2004 by Recherches et Publications, Paris-Neuchâtel, and in Armenian in Yerevan, 2007.

American Journal of Archaeology (AJA 100, 638, 1996) reviewing Kalantar's volume writes: "While Lehmann-Haupt and Marr are often credited with sparking investigations into the history and prehistory of eastern Anatolia and southern Transcaucasia, this compilation* of selected writings and photographs of Ashkharbek Kalantar (1884-1942) makes a persuasive case that it was he who most thoroughly shaped archaeology in the Armenian highlands."

"Kalantar's life and work provide a testimony to the enduring importance of the Armenian highlands to world history and prehistory..."

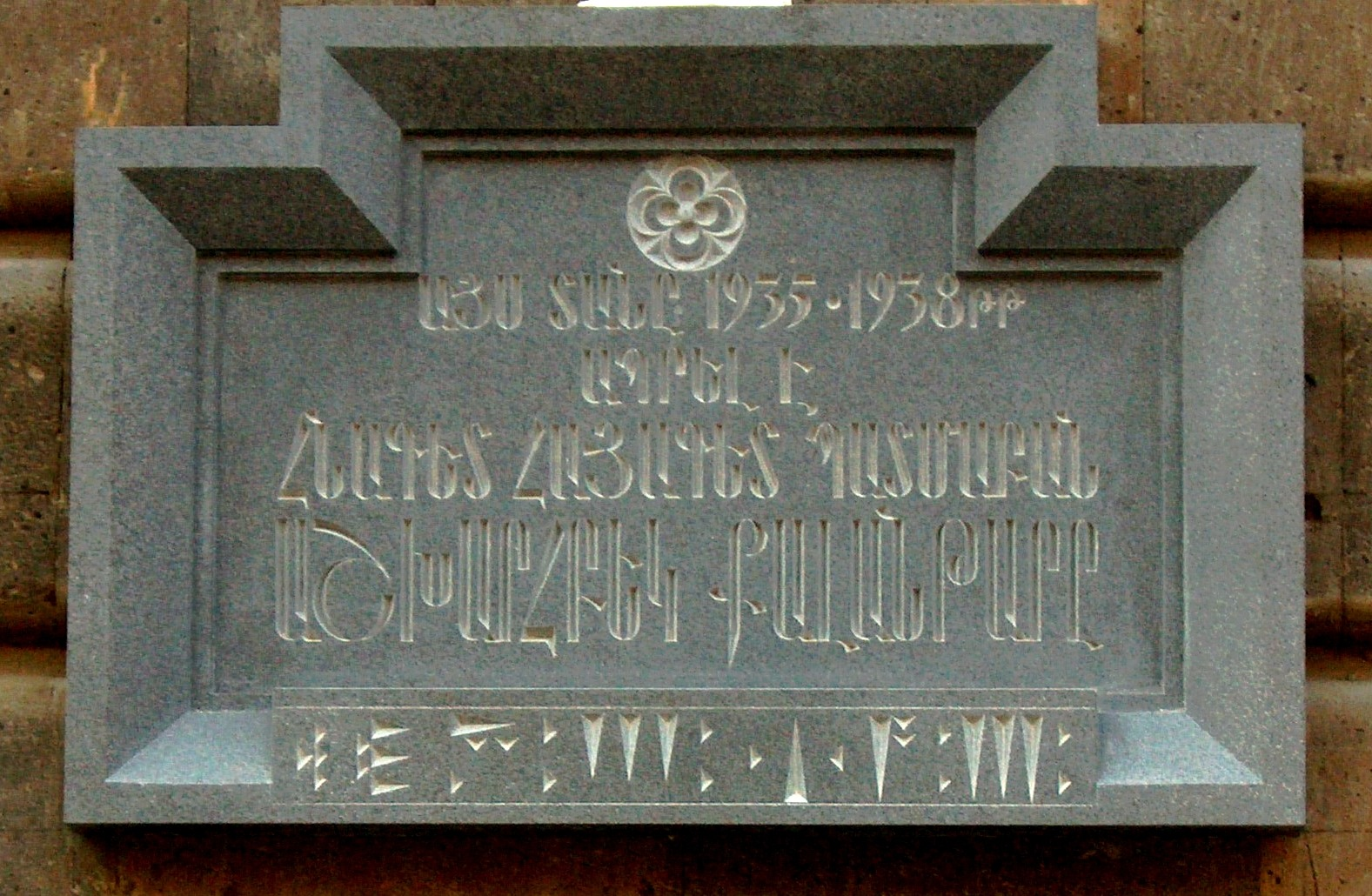
Kalantar's memorial tablet on the building where he lived.

== Great Purge victim ==
On 19 March 1938 Kalantar was arrested in Yerevan by the Stalinist regime, among other professors, as an ‘enemy of the nation’; the precise date and place of his death in Russia are unknown.

== Legacy ==
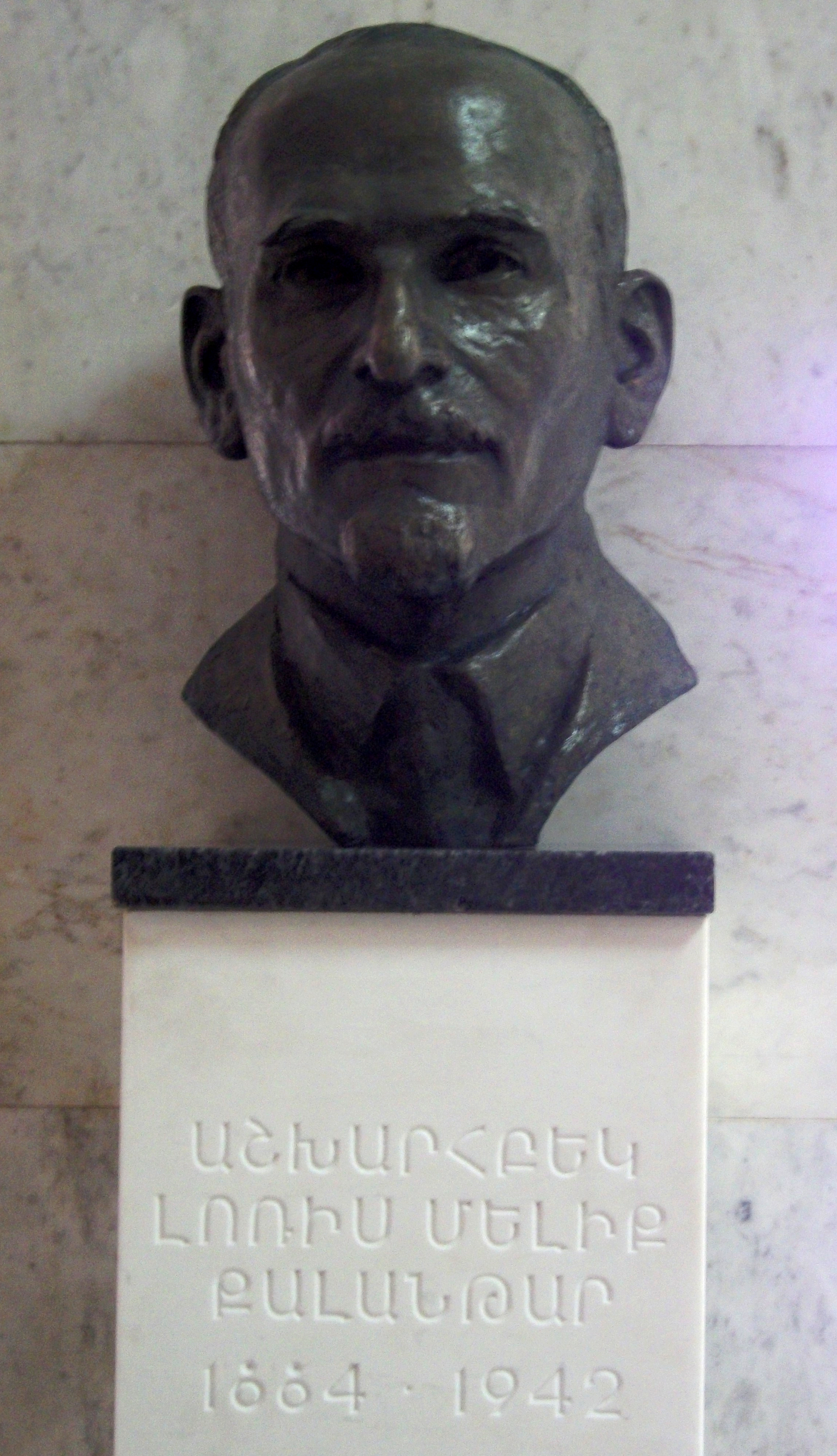
The bronze bust of Ashkharbek Kalantar in Yerevan State University.

A bust of Ashkharbek Kalantar was unveiled in February 2015 in the entrance hall of Yerevan State University.

Edik Minasyan, Dean of the Faculty of History at Yerevan State University, said of Kalantar:

"Being a brilliant scientist, he was also an outstanding patriot. He was a soldier of Andranik, and even during the trial when the claim of this fact was already death, he did not change his words, becoming a victim of violence and in 1955 was posthumously acquitted"

== Later publications ==
- Ashkharbek Kalantar, Armenia: From the Stone Age to the Middle Ages, Civilisations du Proche Orient, Se´rie 1, Vol. 2, Recherches et Publications, Neuchâtel, Paris, 1994; ISBN 978-2-940032-01-3
- Ashkharbek Kalantar, The Mediaeval Inscriptions of Vanstan, Armenia, Civilisations du Proche-Orient: Series 2 - Philologie, Vol. 2, Recherches et Publications, Neuchâtel, Paris, 1999; ISBN 978-2-940032-11-2
- Ashkharbek Kalantar, Materials on Armenian and Urartian History (with a contribution by Mirjo Salvini), Civilisations du Proche-Orient: Series 4 - Hors Série, Neuchâtel, Paris, 2004; ISBN 978-2-940032-14-3

== From Kalantar's documents ==
Of Russian Museum of the Emperor Alexander III, St.Petersburg, 1912

Of Imperial Academy of Sciences, on the excavations in ancient Ani, 1914

"Open List" of Imperial Ministry, St.Petersburg, on the excavations in Ani conducted by Kalantar, 1914

Of Imperial Archaeological Society, St.Petersburg, regarding the expedition to Van, 1917

Of General-Commissar of Turkish Armenia, regarding the expedition to Van, 1917

On visit to ancient Julfa by Kalantar and Jurgis Baltrusaitis of Sorbonne, 1928
