= Nicholas Adontz =

Historian

- Նիկողայոս Ադոնց
- Born: January 10, 1871; Brnakot, Sisian, Russian Empire
- Died: January 27, 1942 (aged 71); Brussels, Belgium
- Education: Saint Petersburg State University
- Known for: -Histoire d'Arménie (1946) -Armenia in the Period of Justinian: the Political; Conditions based on the Naxarar System (1908)
- Scientific career
- Fields: Byzantine studies, Armenian studies
- Workplaces: Russian Academy of Sciences

Nicholas Adontz (Armenian: Նիկողայոս Ադոնց, romanized: Nikoghayos Adonts; Russian: Николай Адонц; January 10, 1871 – January 27, 1942) was an Armenian historian, specialising in Byzantine and Armenian studies, and a philologist. Adontz was the author of Armenia in the Period of Justinian, a highly influential work and landmark study on the social and political structures of early Medieval Armenia.

== Biography ==
=== Early life ===
Adontz was born Nikoghayos Ter-Avetikian (Armenian: Նիկողայոս Տեր-Ավետիքյան) in the village of Brnakot in Sisian, which was then part of the Zangezur uezd of the Elizavetpol Governorate (present-day Syunik). His family traced its roots to an eighteenth-century Armenian military figure and close ally of David Bek named Ter-Avetik. He attended a parochial school in Tatev and later studied at the Gevorkian Theological Seminary in Echmiadzin and the Russian gymnasium in Tiflis (present-day Tbilisi) from 1892–1894.

Adontz was accepted to the University of St. Petersburg and studied at the Departments of Oriental Languages and History and Philology under the general direction of the renowned historian and linguist Nicholas Marr. He learned Latin and Greek and graduated with honors in 1899. Following this, Adontz accompanied Marr to Europe (Munich, Paris, London and Vienna) and the two worked together in the area of Byzantine studies until 1901. In 1903, Adontz returned to the Caucasus, learning Georgian and later working at the manuscript repository in Echmiadzin.

=== Graduate studies ===
Adontz wrote and defended his thesis on "Armenia in the Period of Justinian" in 1908. Adontz was appointed as the private-assistant professor at the University of St. Petersburg in 1909. He received his doctorate and the title of professor after defending his dissertation, entitled "Dionysius of Thrace and his Armenian Commentaries," in 1916. In that same year, with archaeologist Ashkharbek Kalantar, he participated in the second Van archaeological expedition organized by Russian Imperial Academy of Sciences. One year later, he was appointed honorary trustee and professor at the Lazarev Institute of Oriental Languages in Moscow.

=== Later life ===
In 1920, Adontz fled the chaos that had engulfed Russia following the revolutions of 1917 and moved first to London and then Paris. In 1931, Adontz was invited to deliver lectures at the University of Brussels and was appointed to the position of chair of the newly created department for Armenian Studies. During the Second World War, after Belgium's occupation by the Nazis and after Adontz and the other professors refused their orders to work at another institute, the University of Brussels was shut down. Left with no salary, Adontz willed his work to Belgium's small Armenian community, dying shortly thereafter in Brussels on January 27, 1942.

== Academic work ==
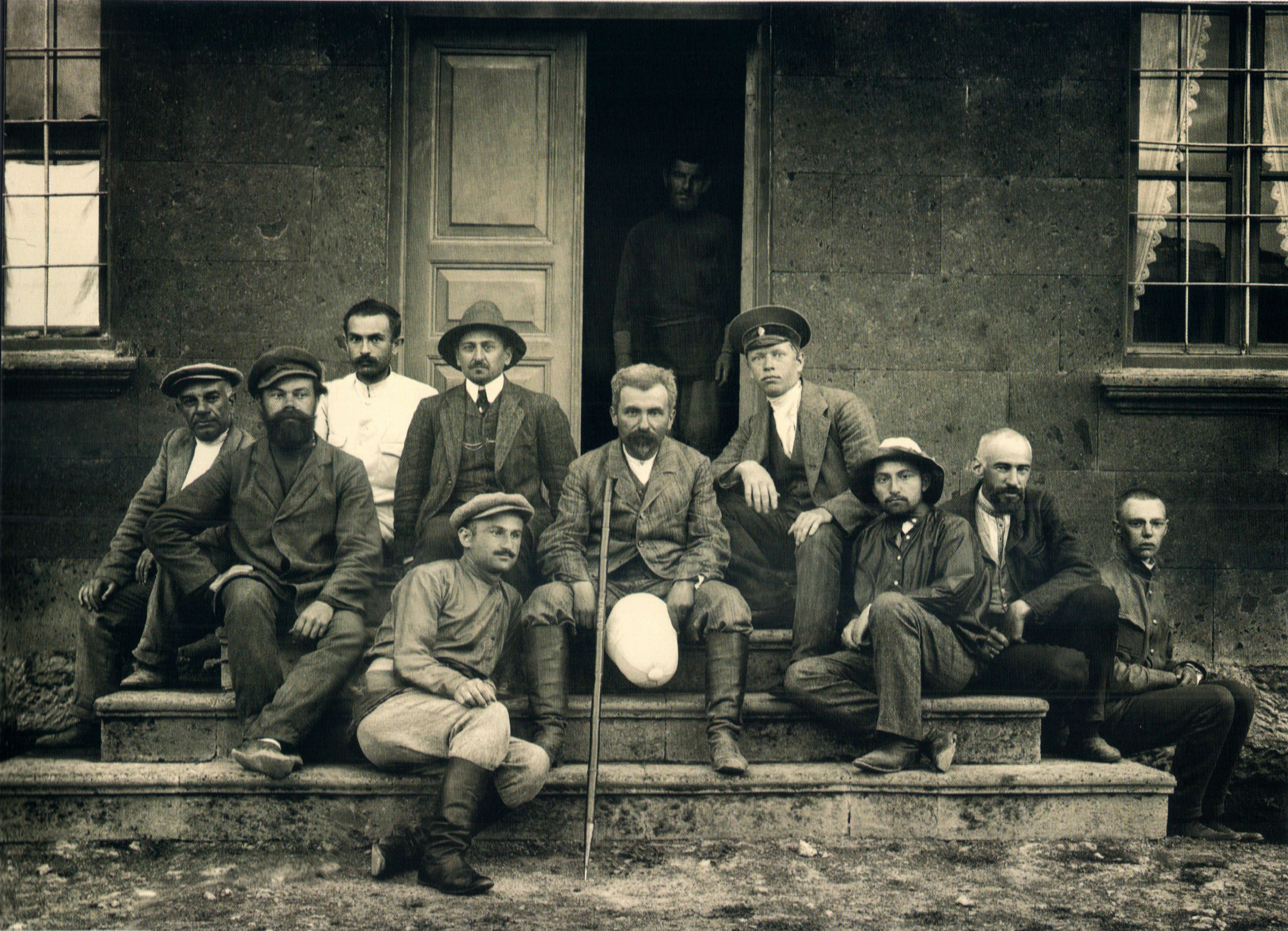
Adontz during Ani expedition, 1912

Adontz left more than 80 monographs on the history and literature of Medieval Armenia, Armenian-Byzantine relations, Armenian-Greek philology, mythology, religion, linguistics in the Armenian, Russian and French languages. He published his first scholarly article in the journal Handes Amsorya in 1901. Some of his other notable works include The Peasantry of Ancient Armenia, The Art of Dionysius Grammarian and his Armenian Interpretations, and Political Parties in Ancient Armenia. His Armenia in the Period of Justinian (in Russian, Armeniia v epokhu Iustiniana: Politicheskoe sostoianie na osnove Nakhararskogo stroia), based on his dissertation, however, is considered to be the most notable and one of the "most important achievements in Armenian studies of the 20th century." In 1970, it was published in English by Byzantine historian Nina G. Garsoïan. In another notable work, Mashtots and his Students According to Foreign Sources, Adontz placed the date of the creation of the Armenian alphabet by its founder, Mesrob Mashtots, to the years 382–392 A.D., approximately 20 years prior to the traditional given date (405).

In a stark departure from his studies on ancient and medieval Armenian history, Adontz took a vested interest in the history of the Armenian Question in the immediate years following the end of the First World War and published a number of works. These included two booklets published in English in 1918, The Historical Basis of the Armenian Question and the Fall of Turkey and The Dismemberment of Turkey; two works published in Russian in the same year, Turkey's Note and Western Armenia and The Armenian Question and German Plans; and The Armenian Question at Sèvres, which was published in English in 1920. He accused Western Europe for taking advantage of the Armenians' plight in the Ottoman Empire in order to increase their own influence in the region. Adontz also condemned Soviet Russia for signing the 1918 Treaty of Brest Litovsk, which effectively left the once-Armenian-populated regions within the borders of the Ottoman Empire.

== Legacy ==
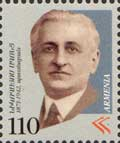
Adontz on an Armenian stamp, 2000

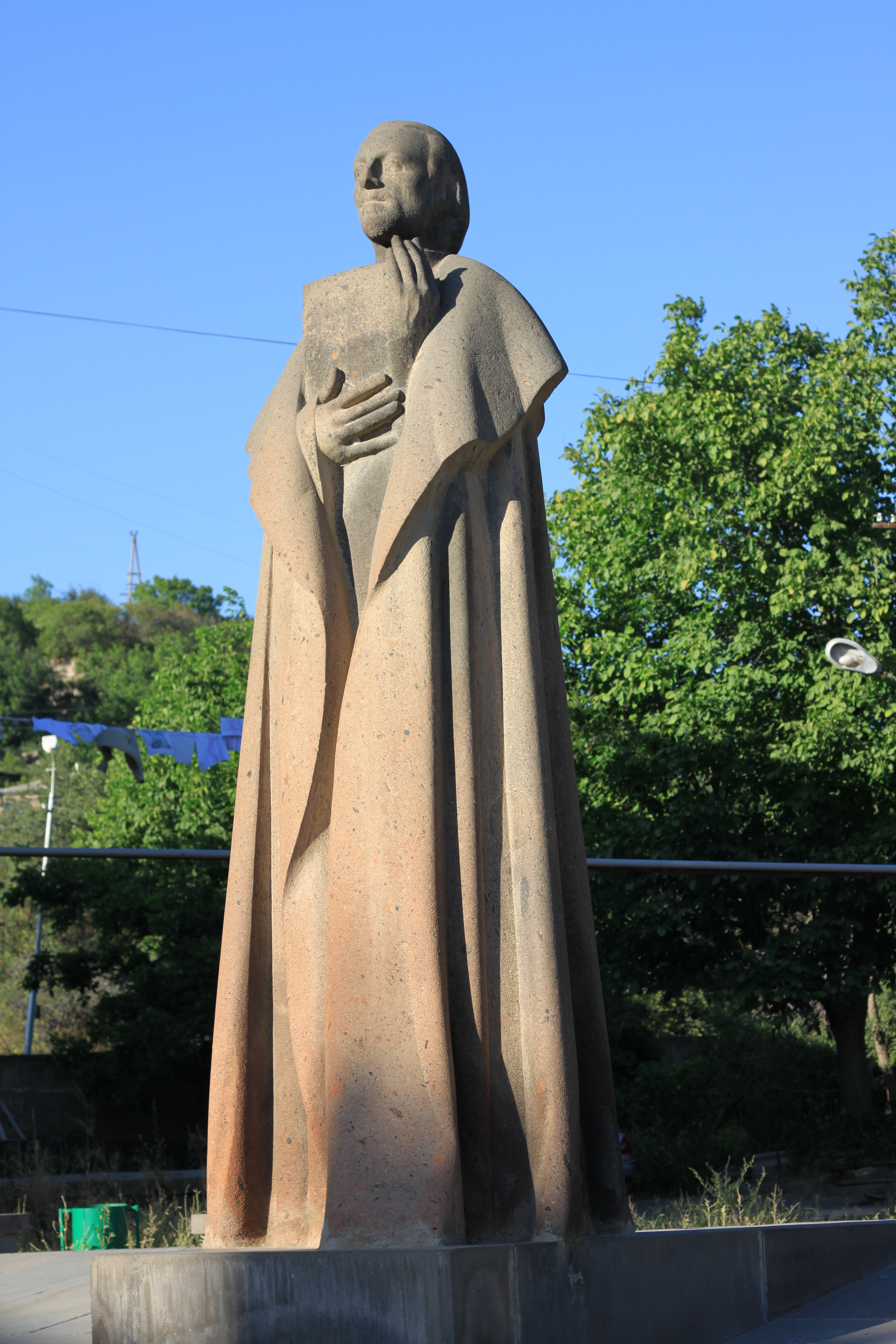
Adontz statue near historical museum of Sisian

== Selected publications ==
- (in French) Samuel l'Armenien, Roi des Bulgares. Bruxelles, Palais des academies, 1938, 63 p. Published also in: Etudes Armeno-Byzantines. Calouste Gulbenkian Foundation. Distributor: Livraria Bertrand. Lisbonne, 1965.
- Histoire d'Arménie, les origines du X-e siècle au vie (av. J.C.). Préf. de René Grousset. Paris, 1946.
- Armenia in the Period of Justinian: the Political Conditions Based on the Naxarar System. Translated with partial revisions, a bibliographical note, and appendices by Nina G. Garsoïan. Lisbon, 1970.
- (in French) Denys de Thrace et les commentateurs arméniens. Lisbon, 1970.
- (in Armenian) Antsano't' e'jer Masht'ots'i ew nra ashakertneri keank'its' e"st o'tar aghbiwrneri [Unknown Pages from the Life of Mashtots and His Students according to Foreign Sources]. 1925.
- Towards the Solution to the Armenian Question. London, 1920.
