= Brnakot =

Brnakot Բռնակոթ
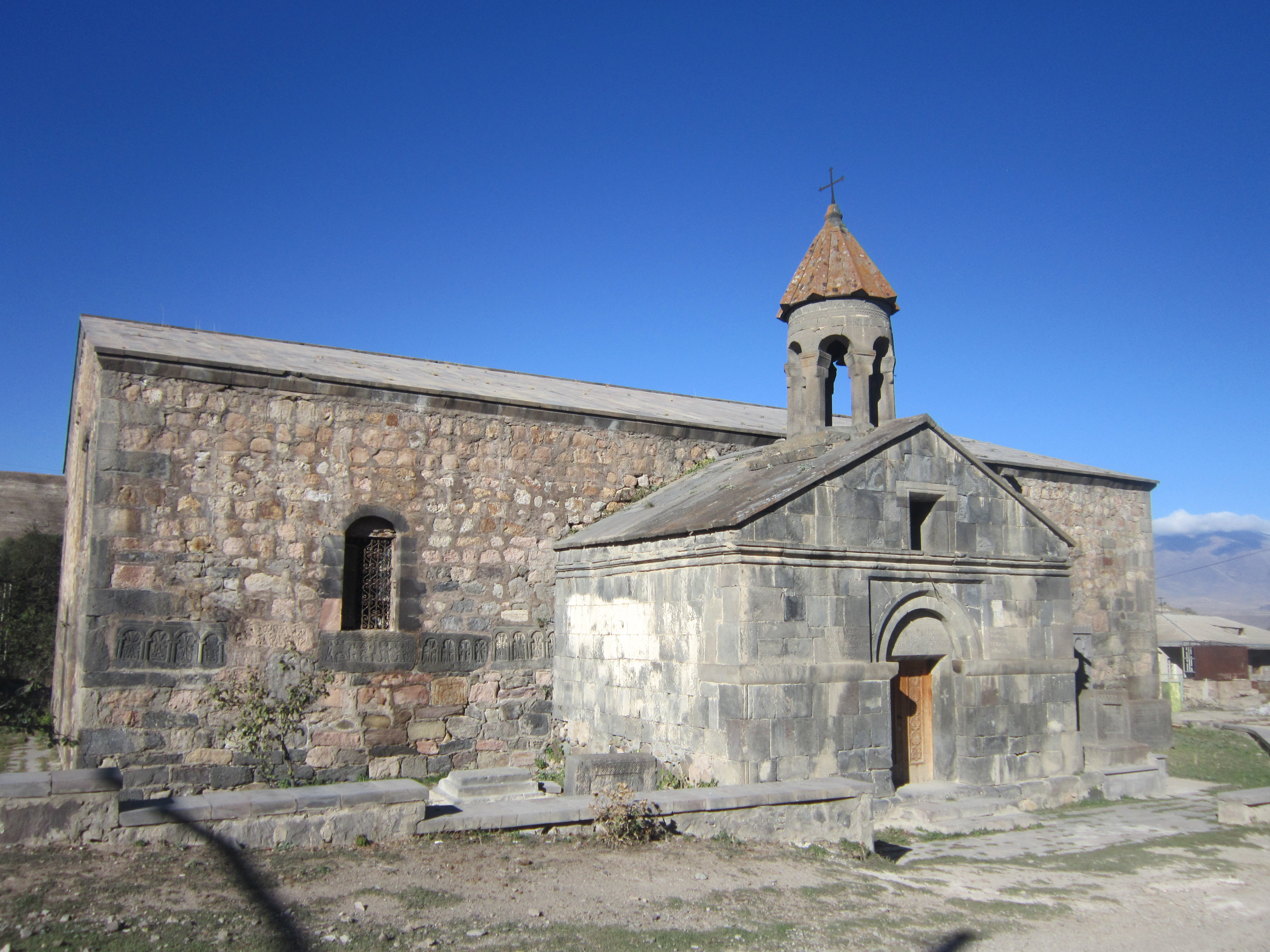
- St. Grigor Church in Brnakot

- Location within Armenia Location within Syunik Province
- Coordinates: 39°29′49″N 45°58′23″E
- Country: Armenia
- Province: Syunik
- Municipality: Sisian

Area
  - Total: 51.53 km^{2} (19.90 sq mi)

Population (2011)
  - Total: 1,960
  - Density: 38.0/km^{2} (98.5/sq mi)
- Time zone: UTC+4 (AMT)

Brnakot (Armenian: Բռնակոթ) is a village in the Sisian Municipality of the Syunik Province in Armenia.

== Demographics ==
The Statistical Committee of Armenia reported its population as 2,315 in 2010, up from 2,103 at the 2001 census.

== Gallery ==
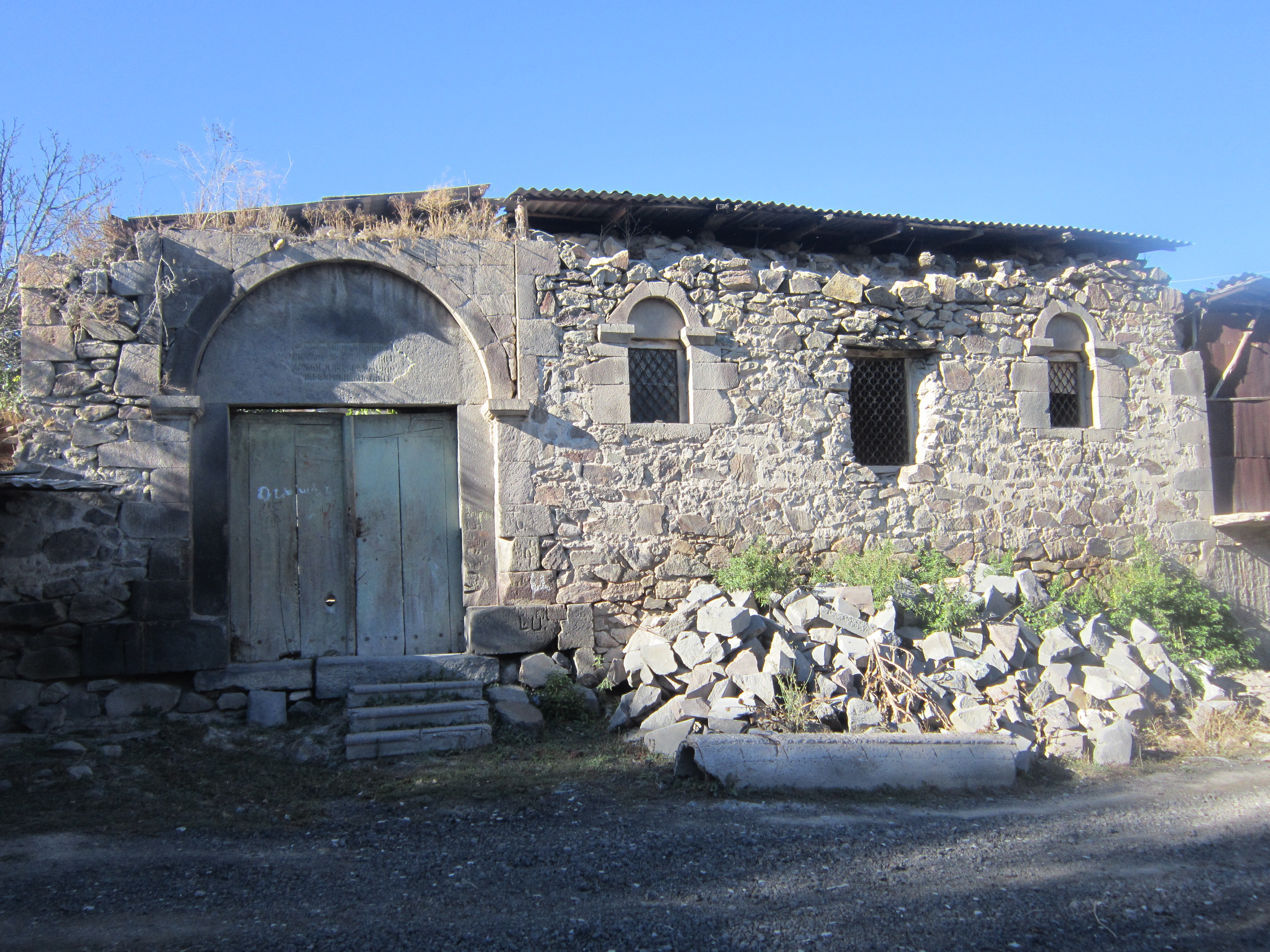
Adonts families house

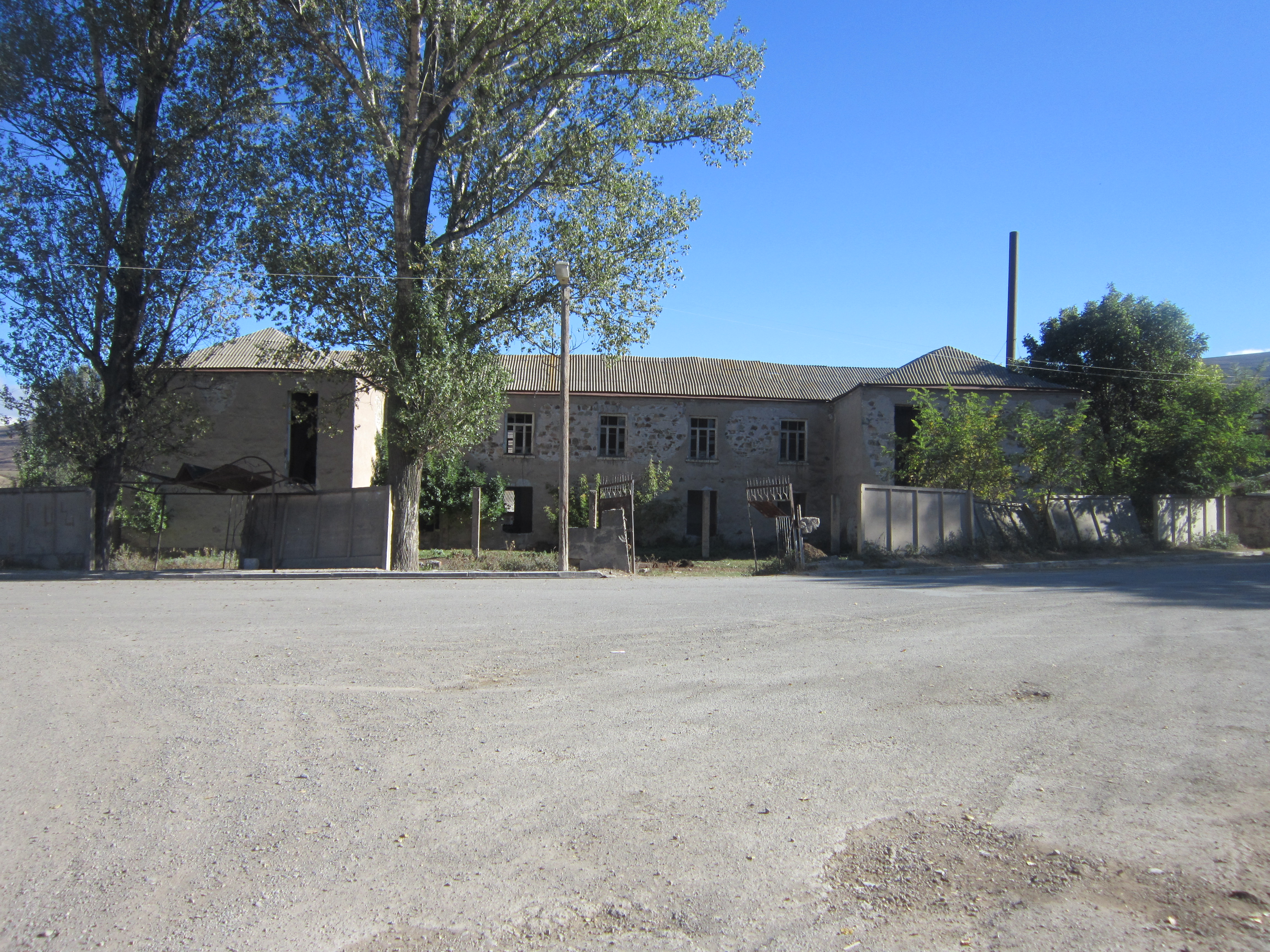
School

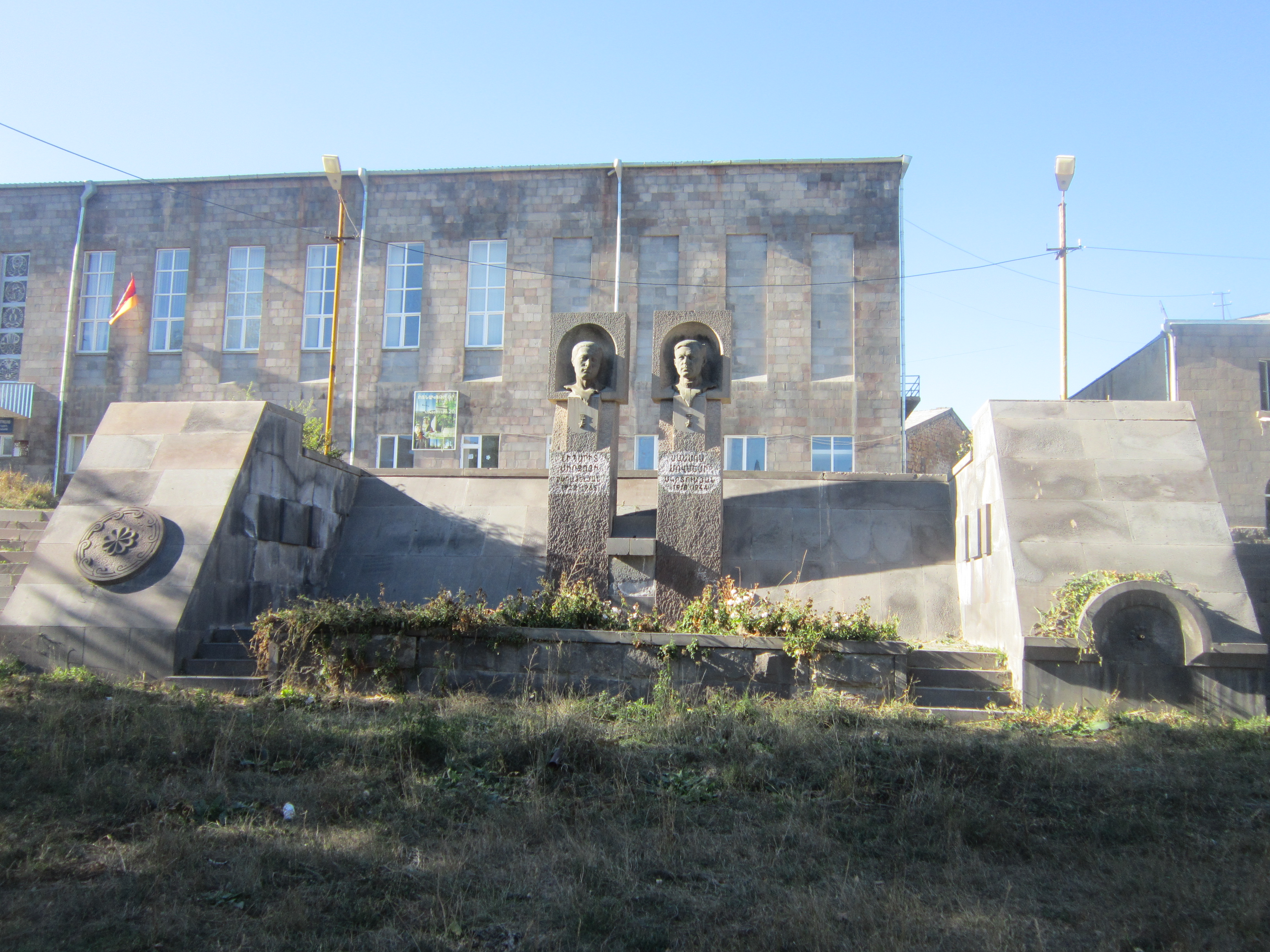
Statues of Liparit Israyelyan and Samson Mkrtumyan

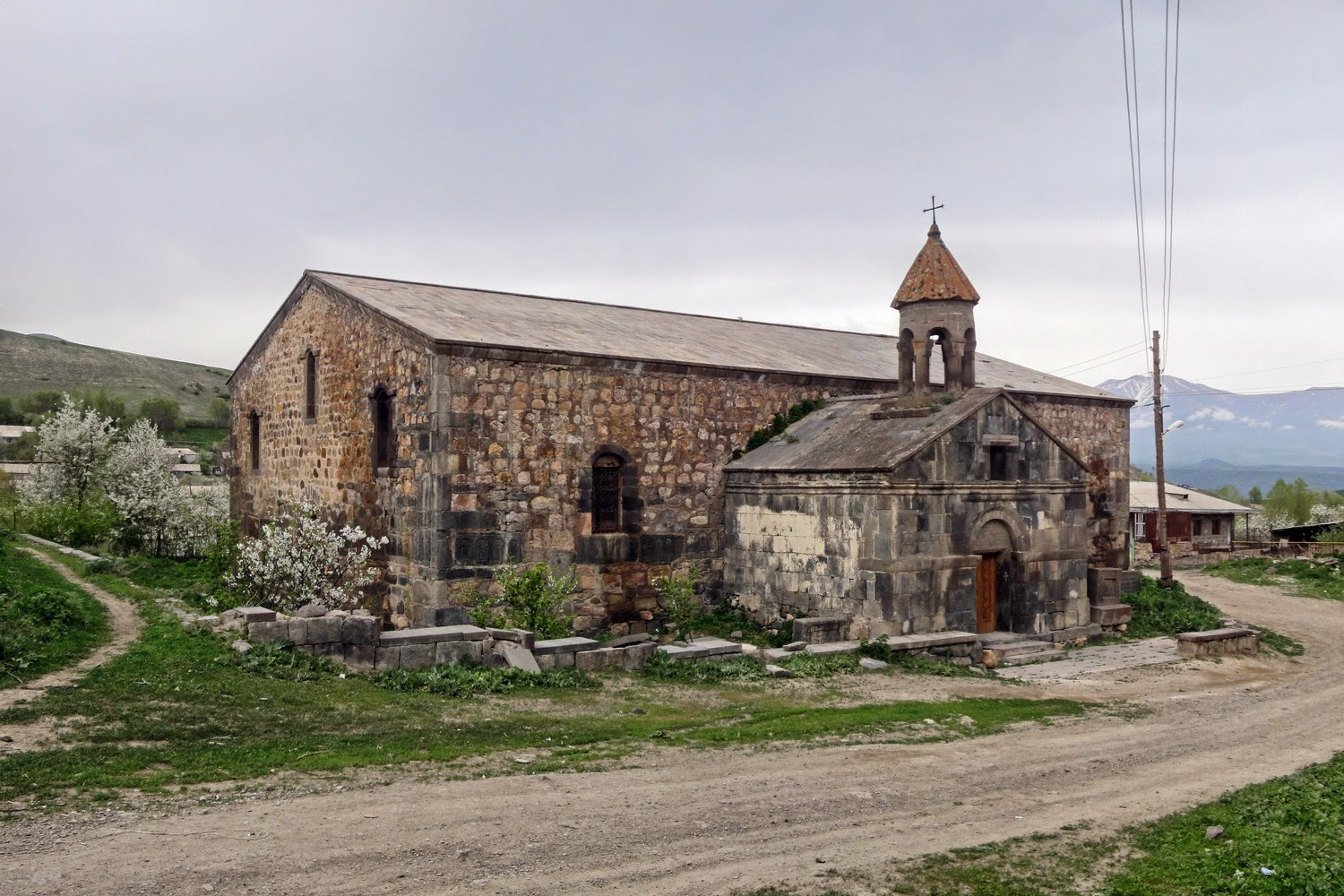
St. Grigor Church in Brnakot

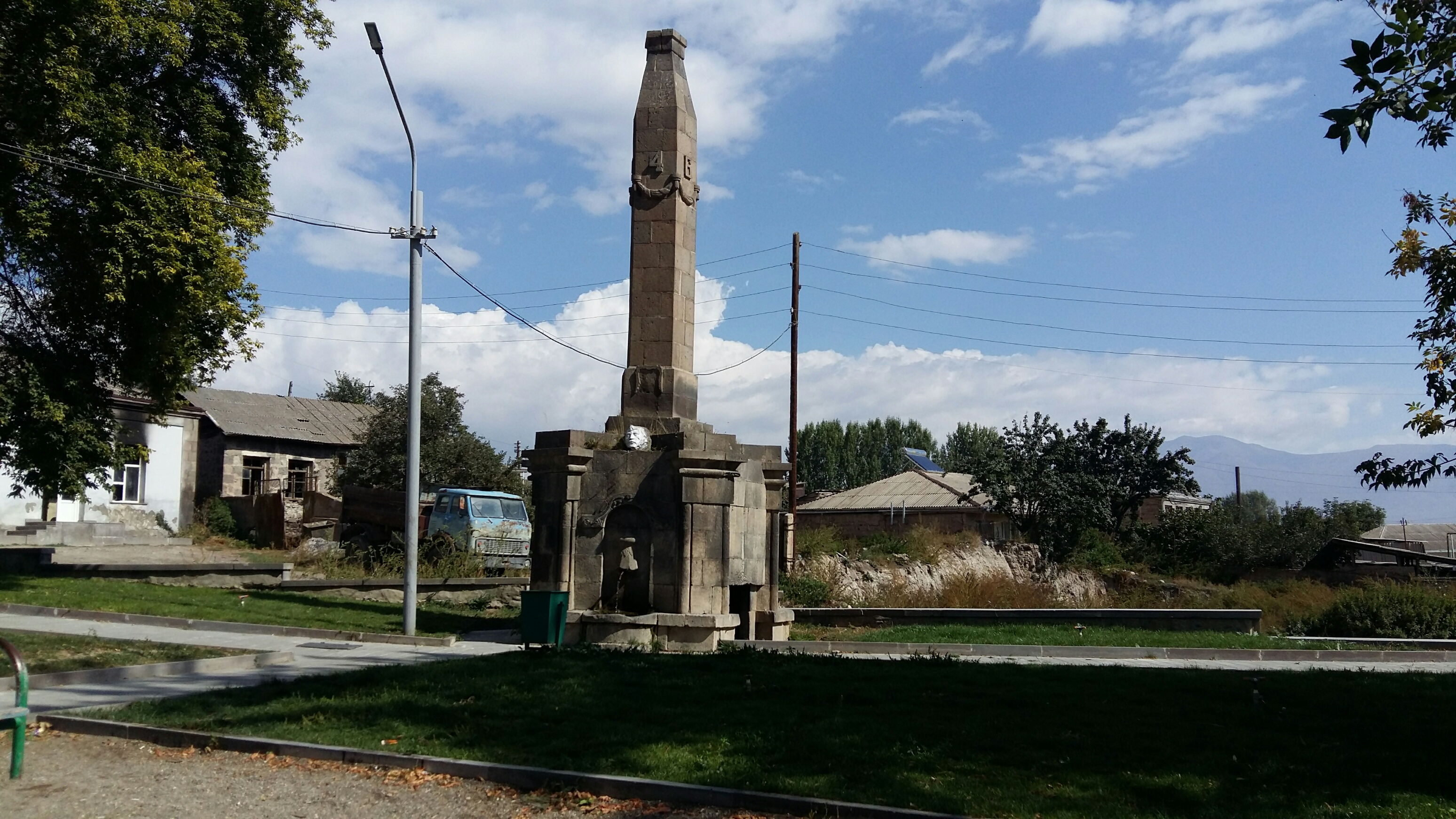
World war II monument

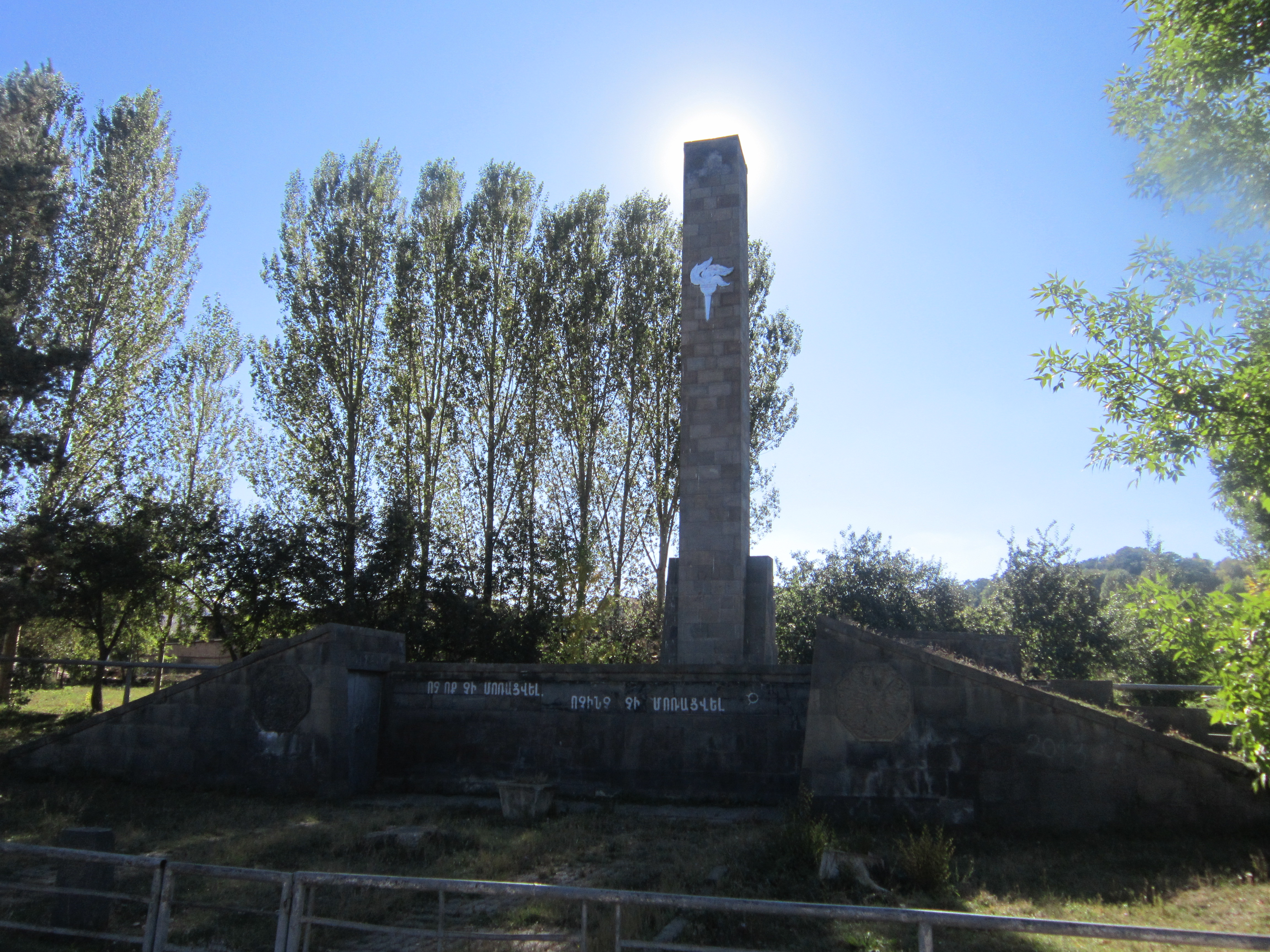
World war II monument
