= Armenian Press in France =

The Armenian press in France (in Armenian Ֆրանսահայ մամուլ) or Armenian-language press in France includes periodicals such as newspapers and literary magazines published by members of the Armenian diaspora in France.

== History ==
To date, more than 200 Armenian-language periodicals have been published in France, mostly in Western Armenian.

=== 19th century ===
The first journal was Maciats Aghavni (Մասեաց աղաւնի, "The Dove of Mount Ararat," 1855–1858 in Paris, then until 1865 in Theodosia) by Father Gabriel Aïvazian (1812-1880, brother of Ivan Aivazovsky), which aimed to promote the cultural, scientific, and moral education of the people. Shortly thereafter, Pariz (Փարիզ, "Paris", 1860–1864) was published. At the same time, Arevelk (Արեւելք, "Orient," 1855-1856) and Arevmoudk (Արեւմուտք, "Occident, " 1859 and 1864–1865) by Stepan Voskan (1825-1901), which espoused a militant and nationalist vision inspired by the Risorgimento. Voskan sought to spread ideas of economic and social progress and ideals of freedom inspired by French political struggles.

With the rise to power of Sultan Abdul Hamid II in 1876 and the Hamidian massacres (1894-1896), which severely affected Armenians in the Ottoman Empire, France received many refugees, especially political ones. Among them were writers such as Minas Tchéraz, who published the monthly magazine L'Arménie (1889-1906, mainly in French), and Mekertich Portukalian, founder of the Armenagan Party, who published the newspaper Armenia (Արմենիա, 1885-1923) in Marseille.

At the end of the century, literary magazines like Anahit (Անահիտ) by Arshag Chobanian began to appear. Its first series (1898–1911) presented the literary works of writers such as Daniel Varoujan, Siamanto and even Komitas. A year after Anahit, the quarterly Panaser (Բանասեր, "The Philologist", 1899–1907) was launched.

French Title (Phonetic)	Armenian Title	Title Translation	Type	Publication Dates	Publication Location	Image
Maciats Aghavni (by Gabriel Aïvazovski)	Մասեաց աղաւնի	"The Dove of Mount Ararat"	Monthly magazine	1855–1858	Paris	
Arevelk (by Stepan Voskan)	Արեւելք	"Orient"	Bi-monthly magazine	1855–1856	Paris	
Pariz	Փարիզ	"Paris"	Magazine	1860–1864	Paris	
Arevmoudk(by Stepan Voskan)	Արեւմուտք	"Occident"	Bi-monthly magazine	1859 and 1864–1865	Paris	
L'Arménie (by Minas Tchéraz)	—	—	Political and literary newspaper	1889–1906	Paris	
Armenia (by Mekertich Portukalian)	Արմէնիա	—	Organ of the Armenagan Party	1885–1923	Marseille	
Anahit (by Arshag Chobanian)	Անահիտ	—	Literary magazine	1898–1949	Paris	
Panaser (by Garabed Basmadjian)	Բանասեր	"The Philologist"	Magazine	1899–1907	Paris	
Hamalsaran (by Missak Baghdassarian and Hovhannes Chavarch)	Համալսարան	"University"	Scientific and literary magazine, monthly/bimonthly	1899–1902	Paris	

=== First half of the 20th century ===
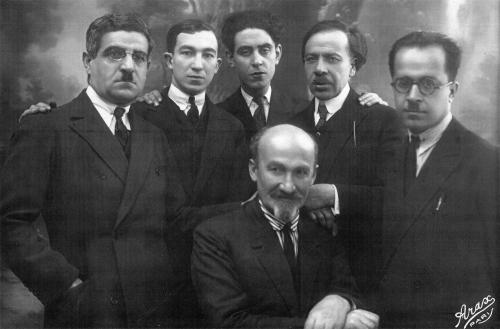
Editors of the Haratch newspaper (February 1928, Paris): Chavarche Missakian, Armen Lubin, Nshan Beshiktashlian, Melkon Kebabdjian, Chavarch Nartouni and Teotig.

By 1920, some 30 periodicals were published. Most were based in Paris, where a small and disorganized Armenian colony of fewer than 1,500 people existed.

Several periodicals appeared in the 1910s, including Haï-Guiank (Հայ-կեանք, "Armenian Life," 1913-1914), Khetan (Խթան, "Stimulus," 1915-1931, by Aram Turabian), Artzakank Parisi (Արձագանգ Փարիզի, "Echoes of Paris," 1916-1925), Veradzenount (Վերածնունդ, "Renaissance," 1917-1921), and Ayk (Այգ, "Dawn," 1919). These newspapers covered topics such as the Armenian genocide and the establishment of the First Republic of Armenia.

The 1920s marked a significant increase in Armenian press activity in France, as refugees fleeing the genocide arrived in large numbers in 1922-1923. About 60 writers, intellectuals, journalists, and poets settled in Paris, along with many young people educated in Armenian schools, especially in Constantinople. These intellectuals established small independent printing presses, such as Araxes, Elekian, Bezazian, du Globe, de Navarre, Nersessian, Turabian, Der-Hagopian, and Le Soleil. About half a dozen of them operated continuously. They also opened bookstores, the most famous being Hrant Samuelian's bookstore, which opened in the Latin Quarter in 1930 after acquiring the inventory of an Armenian bookstore in Constantinople. During this period, described by Anahide Ter Minassian as a "cultural renaissance", 87 Armenian periodicals and thousands of books were published.

French Title (Phonetic)	Armenian	Title Translation	Type	Publication Dates	Publication Location	Image
Coutan	Գութան	"Plow"	Agricultural, science, and arts magazine	1901-1905	Paris	
Joghovourtine hamar	Ժողովուրդին համար	"For the People"	Periodical	1901	Paris	
Jamanak	ժամանակ	"Time"	Literary magazine	1901-1902 (2 numéros)	Paris	
Groung (by Kricor Proff-Kalfaïan)	Կռունկ	"Crane"	Artistic magazine	1904-1905 (2 numéros)	Paris	
Haï-Guiank	Հայ-կեանք	"Armenian Life"	Weekly	1913-1914	Paris	
Khetan (Aiguillon in French) (by Aram Turabian)	Խթան	"Stimulus"	Organ of Armenian volunteers under the French flag	1915-1931	Marseille	
Artzakank Parisi	Արձագանգ Փարիզի	"Echoes of Paris"	Periodical	1916-1925	Paris	
Veradzenount (by Léon Hampartzoumian)	Վերածնունդ	"Renaissance"	Political and cultural magazine, platform of the Armenianophile movement	1917-1921	Paris	
Ayk (by Krikor Balakian)	Այգ	"Dawn"	Periodical	1919	Paris	
Ochacan	Օշական	"Oshakan"	Bi-monthly magazine	1920	Paris	
Zeïtoun	Զէյթուն	"Zeïtoun"	Literary magazine	1920 (2 issues)	Paris	
Abaka	Ապագայ	"Future"	General newspaper of the Ramgavar Party	1921-1950	Paris	
Hayastani dzain (by Dr. Nevrouz)	Հայաստանի ձայն	"Voice of Armenia"	Newspaper	1922-1923	Paris	
Darakir	Տարագիր	"Exile"	Periodical	1923-1924	Marseille	
Norachên	Նորաշէն	"New Construction"	Periodical	1923	Paris	
Hay Panvor	Հայ բանուոր	"Armenian Worker"	Communist newspaper	1924	Paris	
Nor Havadk (by Bedros Zaroyan and Zareh Vorpuni)	Նոր հաւատք	"New Faith"	Literary magazine	1924 (1 issue)	Marseille	
Panvor-Pariz	Բանուոր-Փարիզ	"Worker-Paris"	Communist-affiliated newspaper	1924-1925	Paris	
Haratch (by Chavarche Missakian)	Յառաջ	"Forward"	General newspaper close to the Armenian Revolutionary Federation (ARF)	1925-2009	Paris	
Erevan (by Zabel Yesayan, with French HOG aid)	Երեւան	"Yerevan"	Newspaper	1925-1930	Paris	
Hai Sirt	Հայ Սիրտ	"Armenian Heart"	Newspaper	1925-1938	Marseille	
Nor yerguir	Նոր երկիր	"New Country"	Organ of the French branch of the Social Democrat Hunchakian Party	1926-1937 puis 1954-1955	Paris	
Verelk	Վերելք	"Ascent"	Organ of the Armenian section of the French Communist Party	1926-1927	Paris	
Poujank	Բուժանք	"Healing"	Medical magazine	1926-1930	Paris	
Arakadz (by Hovhannès Boghossian)	Արագած	"Aragats"	Bi-monthly literary magazine	1926	Paris	
Khardots	Խարտոց	"File"	Satirical weekly	1926-1927	Paris	
Gavroche (by Yervant Tolayan)	Կավռօշ	"Gavroche"	Satirical newspaper	1908-1936	Constantinople (1908-1925) Paris (1926-1936)	
Ararat	Արարատ	"Ararat"	Bi-monthly	1927		
Tzolk (notably by Vahram Gakavian)	Ցոլք	"Reflection"	Literary magazine	1928	Paris	
Artzakank Djechmardouthian (by Berdj Armenakian)	Արձագանգ ճշմարտութեան	"Echo of Truth"	Monthly religious magazine	1928-1933	Paris	
Paris			Monthly	1928		
Azatamart (by Shahan Natalie)	Ազատամարտ	"Free Struggle"	Weekly	1928-1929	Paris	
Hay Kir	Հայ Գիր	"Armenian Letter"	Literary magazine of the Armenian Bibliophiles Union	1928-1929	Marseille	
Panvor	Բանուոր	"Worker"	Weekly dedicated to workers' defense	1928-1929	Paris	
Le Foyer (by Levon Pashalian)		"The Hearth"	Bilingual French-Armenian periodical	1928-1932	Paris	
Yergounk (by Chavarch Nartouni)	Երկունք	"Birth Pangs"	Literary magazine, organ of the Association of Adult Orphans	1929-1936	Paris	
Hentchakian mamoul	Հնչակեան մամուլ	"Hentchakian Press"	Newspaper linked to the Social Democrat Hunchakian Party	1929-1931	Paris	
Zvartnots (by Hrant Palouyan)	Զուարթնոց	"House of Watchers"	Literary magazine supporting the ARF	1929-1964	Paris	
Tchank (by Kégham Atmadjian and Missak Manouchian)	Ջանք	"Effort"	Literary magazine	1930-1931	Paris	
Aroghtch guiank	Առողջ կեանք	"Healthy Life"	Medical magazine	1931-1932	Paris	
Menk (by multiple writers)	Մենք	"We"	Literary magazine	1931-1932	Paris	
Guiank yev Arvesd (by the Barsamian brothers)	Կեանք եւ Արուեստ,	"Life and Art"	Literary magazine	1931-1940	Paris	
Mer Oughine	Մեր ուղին	"Our Path"	Communist periodical	1931-1932	Paris	
Haï Guiank (by D. Nichanian)	Հայ կեանք	"Armenian Life"	Bi-monthly magazine	1931	Paris	
Nairi Achkharh	Նաիրի Աշխարհ	"World of Nairi"	Monthly periodical	1931-1933	Paris	
Mardgotz	Մարտկոց	"Battery"	Periodical	1932-1933	Paris	
Archav	Արշավ	"March"	Communist periodical	1932	Paris	
Tarpnots	Դարբնոց	"Forge"	Magazine	1932	Paris	
Arec	Արեգ	"Sun"	Weekly newspaper	1932-1933	Marseille	
Vêm (by Simon Vratsian)	Վէմ	"Rock"	Literary and cultural magazine, cultural organ of the ARF	1933-1940	Paris	
Hog	Հօկ	"HOG"	Magazine of the French branch of the Armenian Relief Committee	1933-1935	Paris	
Zank	Զանգ	"Bell"	Newspaper linked to the Social Democrat Hunchakian Party	1933-1934	Marseille	
Gaïdzer	Կայծեր	"Sparks"	Leftist newspaper	1933-1935	Lyon	
Amrots	Ամրոց	"Fortress"	Newspaper	1934	Paris	
Hay Pouj (by Chavarch Nartouni)	Հայ Բոյժ	"Armenian Doctor"	Medical magazine	1934-1967	Paris	
Razmig	Ռազմիկ	"Fighter"	Bi-monthly organ of the Armenian Volunteers and Combatants Union	1934-1943	Paris	
Mechagouyt (by Kégham Atmadjian and Bedros Zaroyan)	Մշակույթ	"Culture"	Literary magazine	1935-1937	Paris	
Zangou (by Missak Manouchian and HOG)	Զանգու	"Zangou" (river of Yerevan)	Communist newspaper of the French Section of the Armenian Relief Committee	1935-1937	Paris	
Joghovourti Tzain	Ժողովուրդի Ձայն	"Voice of the People"	Economic and literary newspaper	1935-1937	Marseille	
Norachène	Նորաշէն	"New Construction"	Magazine	1936	Lyon	
Nor Gavroche (by Krikor-Vahan)	Նոր Կավռօշ	"The New Gavroche"	Periodical	1937	Paris	
Loussapats (by Bedros Zaroyan and Zareh Vorpouni)	Լուսաբաց	"Dawn"	Literary magazine	1938-1939	Paris	
Haïastan	Հայաստան	"Armenia"	Newspaper of Nor Séround	1939-	Paris	

=== Second half of the 20th century ===
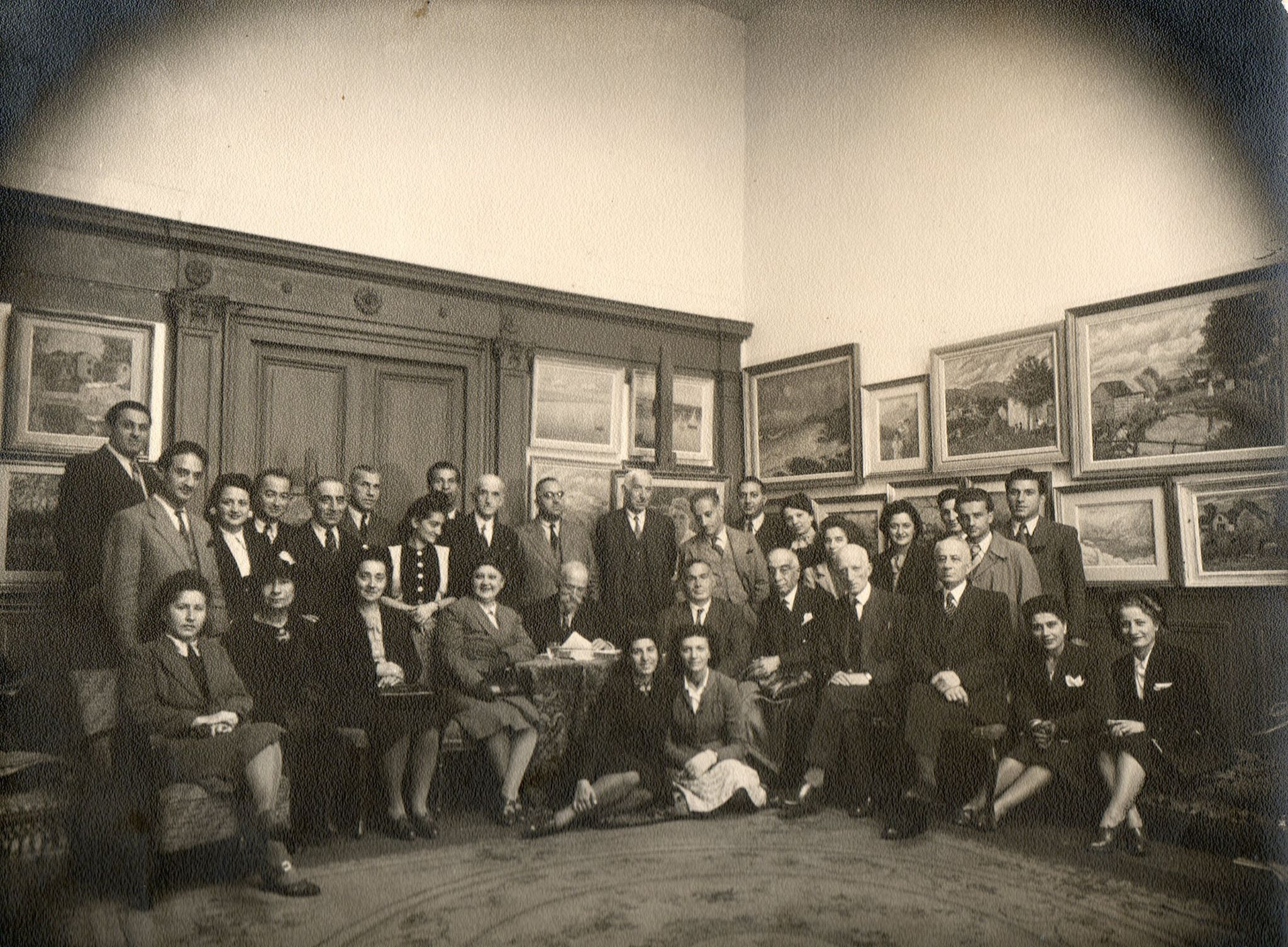
Meeting of intellectuals from the Armenian diaspora in France at Zareh Mutafian's studio in 1944. Among them were Arshag Chobanian, Marie Atmadjian and Dikran Tchitouni and his wife.

During World War II, most newspapers and magazines ceased publication as their staffs were mobilized, joined the resistance, or chose silence to avoid German censorship. Chavarche Missakian, for example, decided not to publish Haratch during the conflict. The publications resumed after the liberation.

French Title (Phonetic)	Armenian	Title Translation	Type	Publication Dates	Publication Location	Image
Haygachên (by Chavarche Missakian)	Հայկաշէն	"Founded by Hayk"	Underground magazine	Possibly 1942–1943 (2 issues)	Paris	
Joghovourt	ժողովուրդ	"People"	Underground newspaper, communist Armenian resistance organ	1943-1948	Paris	
Aradzani (by Chavarche Missakian)	Արածանի	"A Confluence"	Underground literary periodical	c. 1944–1945	Paris	
Arevmoudk	Արեւմուտք	"Occident"	Literary magazine	1945-1952	Paris	
Gues gadag gues chidag	Կես կատակ կես շիտակ	"Half-joking, Half-serious"	Satirical magazine	1945-1950	Paris	
Hai guine	Հայ կին	"The Armenian Woman"	Monthly organ of the Armenian Women's Union	1947-1949	Paris	
Abdag	Ապտակ	"Slap"	Satirical magazine	1948-1950	Paris	
Nerga (by Lévon Tchormissian)	Ներկայ	"Present"	Magazine	1949-1950	Paris	
Azat khosk	Ազատ խոսք	"Free Speech"	Communist newspaper	1949-1951	Paris	
Aïssor Abaka	Այսօր Ապագայ	"Today's Future"	Newspaper	1951-1954	Paris	
Loussaghpiour	Լուսաղբիւր	"Clear Fountain"	Literary magazine	1952-1956, 1959, 1970-1971	Paris	
Andastan (by Puzant Topalian)	Անդաստան	"Field"	Literary magazine	1952-1969	Paris	
Araxe (by N. Hovhanessian)	Արաքս		Illustrated periodical	1952-1955	Paris	
Artsakank	Արձագանգ	"Echo"	Newspaper	1954-1955	Paris	
Hay Midk (by Bedros Zaroyan)	Հայ Միտք	"Armenian Thought"	Literary magazine	1954-1955 (12 numéros)	Paris	
Khetan (by Levon Hampartsoumian)	Խթան	"Impulse"	Weekly newspaper	1955-1970	Paris	
Louys Parizi	Լույս Փարիզի	"Light of Paris"	Newspaper	1957-1959	Paris	
Amsoryag (by Zareh Vorpuni)	Ամսօրեակ	"Monthly"	Literary magazine	1958 (9 numéros)	Paris	
Achkharh	Աշխարհ	"World"	Monthly literary magazine	1960-	Paris	
Burakn	Բիւրակն	"A Thousand Sources"	Periodical	1961-1966	Paris	
Kragan Amsatert (by Zareh Vorpouni)	Գրական Ամսաթերթ	"Literary Monthly"	Literary journal, monthly supplement to Andastan	1961-1962 (8 numéros)	Paris	
Nor Abaka	Նոր Ապագայ	"New Future"	Periodical	1966-1967	Paris	
Haghtanag	Յաղթանակ	"Victory"	Periodical	1971-1990	Paris	
Arahéd	Արահետ	"Path"	Periodical	1975-1986	Paris	
Gam	Կամ	"I Exist"	Magazine	1980-1985	Paris	
Gamk	Կամք	"Will"	Bilingual newspaper, FRA organ	1985-2002	Paris	
Gayk	Կայք	"Place"	Periodical	1989-1993	Paris	

=== Nowadays ===
By the 21st century, Armenian-language periodicals in France had all but disappeared. The last major daily, Haratch, closed in 2009 and was replaced by Nor Haratch in the same year.

This decline is largely attributed to the fact that the Armenian diaspora in France is mainly composed of second and third-generation Armenians who, for the most part, no longer speak Armenian.

Currently, the main press of the Armenian diaspora in France is predominantly in French, with Nouvelles d'Arménie Magazine (1995-) and France Arménie (1982-) being the most notable publications. The few remaining Armenian-language publications are mostly church bulletins.

== See also ==
- Armenians in France
- Armenian literature

== Bibliography ==
- Mouradian, Claire (1990). "La vitalité d'une presse en diaspora" [The vitality of a diaspora press]. Presse et mémoire : France des étrangers, France des libertés [Press and memory: France of foreigners, France of freedoms] (in French). Éditions de l'Atelier. pp. 35–45. ISBN 978-2708228719. Archived from the original on December 31, 2024.
- Ter Minassian, Anahide (1995). "Les Arméniens de Paris depuis 1945" [The Armenians of Paris since 1945]. Le Paris des étrangers depuis 1945 [Foreigners in Paris since 1945] (in French). Paris: Éditions de la Sorbonne. pp. 205–239. ISBN 978-2859448639. Archived from the original on December 26, 2023.
- Ter Minassian, Anahide (1997). Histoires croisées : Diaspora, Arménie, Transcaucasie, 1880-1990 [Histoires croisées : Diaspora, Armenia, Transcaucasia, 1880-1990] (in French). Parenthèses. ISBN 978-2863640760. Archived from the original on November 27, 2024.
- Beledian, Krikor (2001). Cinquante ans de littérature arménienne en France : Du même à l'autre [Fifty years of Armenian literature in France: From the same to the other] (in French). Paris: CNRS Éditions. pp. 205–239. ISBN 978-2-271-05929-1.
- Le Tallec, Cyril (2003). La communauté arménienne de France, 1920-1950 [The Armenian community in France, 1920-1950] (in French). Paris: Éditions L'Harmattan. pp. 205–239. ISBN 978-2-7475-0480-5. Archived from the original on November 27, 2024.
- Mouradian, Claire; Kunth, Anouche (2010). Les Arméniens en France : Du chaos à la reconnaissance [Armenians in France: From chaos to recognition]. Exils (in French). Toulouse: Éditions de l'attribut. pp. 205–239. ISBN 978-2-916002-18-7. Archived from the original on December 31, 2024.
- Beledian, Krikor (2010). "D'un exil à l'autre, les lieux disloqués : Littérature arménienne en France" [From one exile to another, dislocated places : Armenian literature in France] (PDF). Hommes et Migrations (in French) (1288). doi:10.4000/hommesmigrations.882. ISSN 2262-3353. Archived from the original (PDF) on October 2, 2023.
- Hacikyan, Agop J; Basmajian, Gabriel; Franchuk, Edward S; Ouzounian, Nourhan (2005). The Heritage of Armenian Literature, vol. III : From The Eighteenth Century To Modern Times. Wayne State University Press. ISBN 0-8143-3221-8.
