= Jamanak =

Armenian language newspaper published in Turkey

Jamanak Ժամանակ
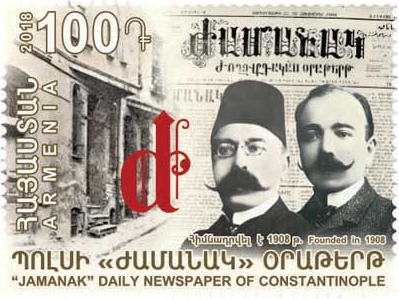
- A 2018 stamp dedicated to the 110th anniversary of Jamanak, showing its old building, logotype, and founders, brothers Misak and Sarkis Koçunyan
- Type: Daily newspaper
- Format: Broadsheet
- Owner(s): Ara Koçunyan
- Editor: Ara Koçunyan
- Founded: 1908 by Misak Koçunyan
- Language: Western Armenian
- Headquarters: 22, Beyoğlu, Istanbul, Turkey
- Website: http://www.jamanak.com/

Jamanak (Armenian: Ժամանակ, lit. 'time') is the longest continuously running Armenian language daily newspaper in the world. It is published in Istanbul, Turkey.

== History ==
The first issue appeared on October 28, 1908 with Misak Koçunyan as the editor and has been somewhat a family establishment, for it has been owned by the Koçunyan family since its inception. After Misak Koçounyan, it was passed down to Sarkis Koçunyan, and since 1992 to Ara Koçunyan.

Many illustrious names in Armenian literature have been contributors to the paper, including Krikor Zohrab, Daniel Varujan, Vahan Tekeyan, Yerukhan, Gomidas, Hovhannes Tumanyan, Teotig, Arshaguhi Teotig, Ruben Sevak, Zabel Yesayan, Sibil, Nigoghos Sarafian, Vazken Shushanyan, Zareh Vorpuni, Nshan Beshiktashlian, Hagop Mntsuri, Msho Kegham, Zahrad, Zaven Biberyan, Toros Azadyan, Minas Tölelyan, among others.

The newspaper uses the Western Armenian language and traditional Mesrobian spelling.

The editorial offices are located in Beyoğlu, Istanbul, Turkey.

== See also ==
- Media of Armenia

== Links ==
- Jamanak Daily
