= Missakian =

Missakian may refer to:

- Arpik Missakian (1926–2015), Armenian-French journalist
- Berge Missakian (1933–2017), Egyptian-Canadian artist
- Chavarche Missakian (1884–1957), Armenian-born French journalist
