= Haratch (disambiguation) =

Haratch is an Armenian word for "forward". It may refer to:

- Haratch, long-running French Armenian daily publication in Paris (1925–2009)
- Haratch, publication of the Armenian Revolutionary Federation in Tbilisi, Georgia (1906–1909) - See media section of Armenians in Georgia
- Haratch (weekly), Lebanese Armenian Communist publication (1958–1970)
- Nor Haratch, French Armenian periodical newspaper published in Paris starting 2009

== See also ==
- "Haratch", the St. Catharines, Ontario, Canada chapter of the Armenian Youth Federation
- Haratch Calouste Gulbenkian Secondary School, in Anjar, Lebanon
