= Arby Ovanessian =

Iranian-Armenian film director and stage director

- آربی اوانسیان
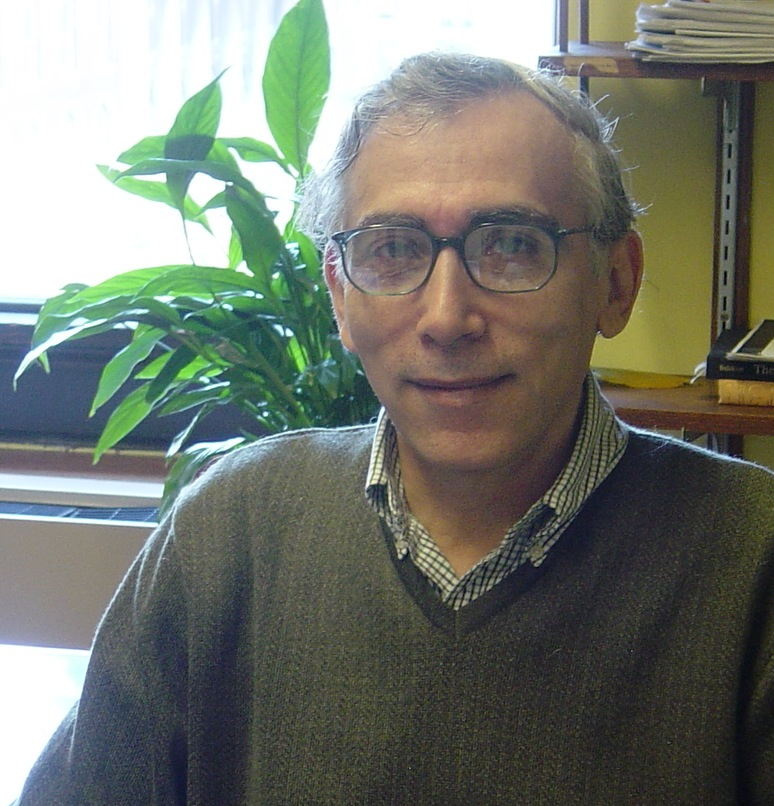
- Born: February 20, 1942 (age 84); New Julfa, Iran
- Other name: Արբի Յովհաննիսեան
- Citizenship: Iranian, French
- Education: London Film School
- Known for: Theartre and film director

Arby Ovanessian (b. February 20, 1942; Persian: آربی اوانسیان Armenian: Արբի Յովհաննիսեան) is an Iranian-Armenian film director and stage director living in Paris.

== Biography ==
Arby Ovanessian was born on February 20, 1942, in New Julfa, the Armenian quarter of Isfahan, founded in 1606 by Shah Abbas I. This area is a significant cultural center for Armenians in Iran, named after the city of Julfa in Nakhichevan, from where many Armenians were deported by the Safavid Shah. After completing his university studies in Tehran, he went on to study film at the London Film School (1963–1966). There, he created "Parvana," an animated film directed by Richard Williams, which represented the United Kingdom at the International Short Film Festival Oberhausen.

Upon returning to Iran, he consistently combined theater and cinema. He joined the selection committee of the Shiraz Arts Festival, which allowed him to discover a young, previously unknown writer and newspaper seller, Abbas Nalbandian. He staged a memorable production of "A New, Profound, and Important Research on the Fossils of the Twenty-Fifth Geological Era" for the festival's second edition.

In 1970, Peter Brook invited him to participate in the experimental research at the International Center for Theatre Research. He collaborated with Brook on the staging of "Orgast" by English poet Ted Hughes at the Shiraz Arts Festival. From 1970 to 1976, he worked with directors such as Jerzy Grotowski (Special Project) and Andrei Serban (The Master and Margarita). In 1976, he co-founded the Charsoo Theatre in Tehran with Sadr al-Din Zahed.

He moved to Paris in 1979, after the Islamic Revolution, despite not speaking French. Since then, he has continued to promote Armenian culture tirelessly.

He is an advocate for experimentation in theater and cinema. His theatrical productions have been presented at numerous festivals around the world and at the Théâtre des Nations.

He refuses to consider his theater as political, stating in 1979: "The occurrence of a revolution does not mean that the artist himself becomes revolutionary, but it means that what he believed in has come to fruition. Creation is always revolutionary, but it constantly evolves. Whereas, in terms of politics... sometimes things come to a halt."

== Works ==
He has directed dozens of productions in four different languages: English, French, Persian, and Armenian.

=== Theater productions directed ===
- 1967: Miss Julie by August Strindberg
- 1968: Honorables mendiants by Hagop Baronian
- 1968: A New, Profound, and Important Research on the Fossils of the Twenty-Fifth Geological Era by Abbas Nalbandian
- 1969: Hedda Gabler by Henrik Ibsen
- 1969: Sur la route by Levon Shant
- 1970: Vis et Ramin by Mahin Jahanbeglou
- 1971: The Ward Wants to Be the Guardian (Das Mündel will Vormund sein) by Peter Handke
- 1971: Introspection (Selbstbezichtigung) by Peter Handke
- 1972: Tout à la fois by Abbas Nalbandian
- 1972: The Cherry Orchard by Anton Chekhov
- 1973: Happy Days by Samuel Beckett
- 1973: As We Were by Arthur Adamov
- 1973: Creditors by August Strindberg
- 1974: The Man, the Beast and the Virtue by Luigi Pirandello
- 1974: Caligula by Albert Camus
- 1974: Little Eyolf by Henrik Ibsen
- 1975: For Someone Else by Levon Shant
- 1976: Here Appeared a Knight by Mahin Jahanbeglou
- 1976: The Sleeper's Den by Peter Gill
- 1976: Śmieszny staruszek by Tadeusz Różewicz
- 1976: The Two-Character Play by Tennessee Williams
- 1979: The Lady with the Dog by Anton Chekhov. With Sacha Pitoëff, Paloma Matta. Autumn Festival in Paris, Centre Georges Pompidou.
- 1983: How My Mother's Embroidered Apron Unfolds in My Life with texts by Levon Shant, Arshile Gorky, and Vasken Chouchanian. Hôtel de Saint-Aignan, Paris
- 1983: The Master and Margarita by Mikhail Bulgakov. With Fanny Cottençon, Michel Robin, Andrzej Seweryn. Théâtre de la Ville
- 1987: Les Merveilleux by Yéghya Kasparian, Cathédrale Sainte-Croix de Paris des Arméniens
- 1988: The Chained by Levon Shant, Chapelle Saint-Louis de la Salpêtrière
- 1994: Act Without Words I & II by Samuel Beckett
- 1998: For Someone Else by Levon Shant. Théâtre Espace Acteur
- 2007: The Invasion by Arthur Adamov
- 2007: Across the Board on Tomorrow Morning by William Saroyan
- 2009: The Poetic Situation in America Since Alexandre Dumas and Several Others by William Saroyan

=== Films directed ===
- 1964: The Mask
- 1965: Parvanna
- 1967: Lebbeus in the Name of Thaddeus. Ghara Kelisa
- 1972: La Source
- 1985: How My Mother's Embroidered Apron Unfolds in My Life
- 2006: Rouben Mamoulian, The Golden Age of Broadway and Hollywood
- 2019: Haratch 83; Known and Unknown Portrait, a documentary about Arpik Missakian, the former editor-in-chief of Haratch
