= Alina Mnatsakanian =

American-Swiss artist (born 1958)

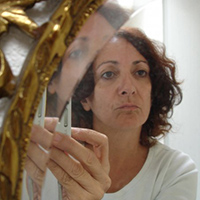
- Born: February 11, 1958 (age 68); Tehran, Pahlavi Iran
- Other name: Alina Mnatsakanian Zorik
- Occupation: Visual artist
- Known for: Installation art, new media art
- Movement: Conceptual art

Alina Mnatsakanian (born 1958) is an Iranian-born American-Swiss visual artist, of Armenian descent, known for her conceptual installations in various media (video, sound, robotics, objects) and her style of painting and drawing called Marks. Identity, borders, and injustice are her preferred themes.

She lives and works in Neuchâtel, Switzerland. From 2011 to 2017, she was the president, and since 2017, she has been the co-president of Visarte Neuchâtel, the Swiss Association of professional visual artists.

== Early life ==
Mnatsakanian was born in Tehran, Pahlavi Iran. Her mother, Hasmik Haroutunian, is a plastic surgeon, and her father, Leon Mnatsakanian, was an architect. From 1976 to 1978 Mnatsakanian studied architecture at the School of Architecture at the University of Tehran.

In 1979 during the Iranian Revolution, she moved to Paris to continue her studies in visual art at the University of Paris 8. During her studies one professor was crucial in the development of her work, Edmond Couchot. His conceptual and analytical way of thinking influenced Mnatsakanian in her future work. One of the outcomes of her studies was Verb-images, a series that she created using the letters of the Armenian alphabet. The formal and conventional form that is writing, through a transformation from verbal to visual mode, takes a pure image value without reference to recognizable forms. This research aims to use a conventional and well-known form to create abstract visual imagery.

From 1981 to 1983, Mnatsakanian became part of the director Arby Ovanessian's theater group, who is known for his experimental creations. The two-year experience gave birth to “How my mother’s embroidered apron enfolds in my life”. The film version of the play was produced in 1985. Mnatsakanian participated as an actor in both the play and the movie versions of this work.

== Career ==
=== Los Angeles ===
In 1984, Mnatsakanian moved to Los Angeles. She started her career in art and design. She received a master's degree in arts from the California State University of Los Angeles in 2000. Professors Joe Soldate and Elizabeth Bryant were essential influences in installation art and video. During her studies, Mnatsakanian started questioning her identity. She was born in Iran; lived in France and is now in the US, and she considers herself Armenian. She addressed her thoughts in her artworks. In Box, Cross, Dismemberment, Genocide (1996), she addressed the Armenian genocide in an installation/performance, mixing objects, images, music and performance. A later work of this period is the Self Portrait (1997), where she puts various things, including the earth, a house, and her image in cardboard boxes. She uses cardboard boxes again in another installation called Journey (1997).

In this period, her work becomes more symbolic. A basic house shape is recurrent in her works and the earth. In 2000 she created the House on Wheels , a video installation with a house on wheels in the center. It is an autobiographical work that addresses her life in 3 countries and her Armenian identity. It is a reference to her multicultural self.

In 2003, Mnatsakanian received a grant from the California Council for the Humanities for Our Stories, a community-based project where she worked with a group of multi-cultural students and created a sound installation with their stories told in various languages. In the same year she created a work called 1 person died. Three legal sized notebooks containing the phrase “1 person died” repeated one and a half million times. The work was meant to acknowledge every person perished during the Armenian genocide at the beginning of the 20th century.

=== Switzerland ===
In 2006, Mnatsakanian moved to Switzerland. She created a new work style called Marks: paintings and drawings, often in multiple layers, resembling writing. “When we go from one place to another, we put our marks. The new marks don’t cover the old ones but complement them.” says Mnatsakanian. In 2007 she receives a grant from the Swiss Federal Office of Culture for an installation entitled The mountain comes to me. In an installation with five videos, a robot and a model of Mount Ararat, the mountain close to Armenians and Armenia but in a different country, goes for a world tour.

For The mountain comes to me, Mnatsakanian receives the help of the Ecole Polytechnique (EPFL) of Lausanne. The collaboration was to use a robot to move the mountain. Their experience with robotics continued in 2009 when she got accepted to a Swiss Artists in Labs residency at the Institute of Artificial Intelligence in Lugano. During the 9-month residency she got acquainted with the world of the artificial intelligence and the robotics and at the end of the period she delivered a robotic performance with small wheeled robots. The performance was called When I woke up the sun had moved, another work related to movement and how it changes the conditions of life.

In her installations and performances, the media follows the concepts. Thus in 2012, she created a site-specific installation in Armenia, Our cyclopean walls, which was a community building work that resulted in the cleaning of a village—where exist historical cyclopean walls—and creating a wall with plastic bottles, pieces of metal, paper, and glass found during the cleaning process.

In 2014 Mnatsakanian curated a show at the Museum of modern art, Yerevan, Armenia, with Edmond Habetian from France and Catherine Aeschlimann, Geneviève Petermann, Josette Taramarcaz and Pier Giorgio de Pinto from Switzerland. The project was called “Come Closer” and aimed to connect with the local public through interactive artworks and various events. Mnatsakanian created an interactive installation called Message in a bottle for this exhibition.

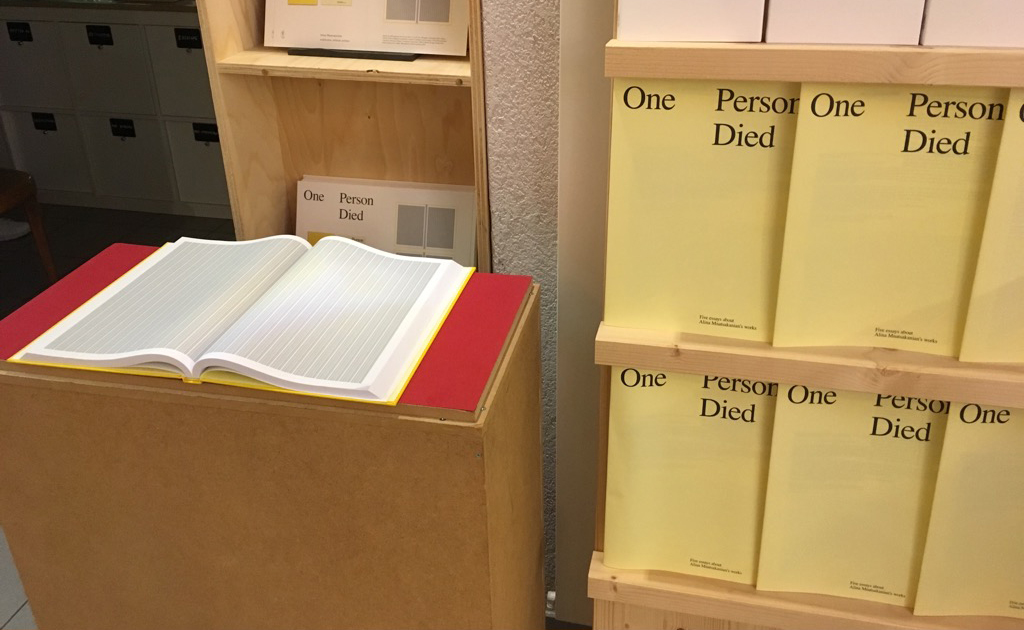
One person died book and booklets

2015 was the centennial of the Armenian genocide. Mnatsakanian created a projectable version of the 1 person died, that she called One person died, ephemeral monument. The idea was to project the work in as many places as possible in Switzerland and elsewhere. Technically the work is a software that repeats the phrase “one person died” in different sizes and shades of grey. A counter in red tallies the repetition and restarts when it reaches 1.5 million. In 2017 Mnatsakanian documented this project as well as her other works related to the Genocide in a double book which was published in 2018. One of the books is a 3rd version of the 1 person died, printed in 100 limited edition copies. The accompanying book is written by five writers in five different languages, all translated into English. The writers are Mario Casanova, Ramela Grigorian Abbamontian, Alice Henkes, Suren Manukyan and Karine Tissot.

In 2016 Mnatsakanian started a series of collaborations with musicians. The result of these collaborations was a series of animated and digital paintings. An animated painting is a painting that evolves gradually throughout the music, where the viewer can see many mutations of the work. She collaborated with Karine Vartanian, pianist, with Serj Tankian of the System of a down and in 2019 with Barbara Minder, the flutist.

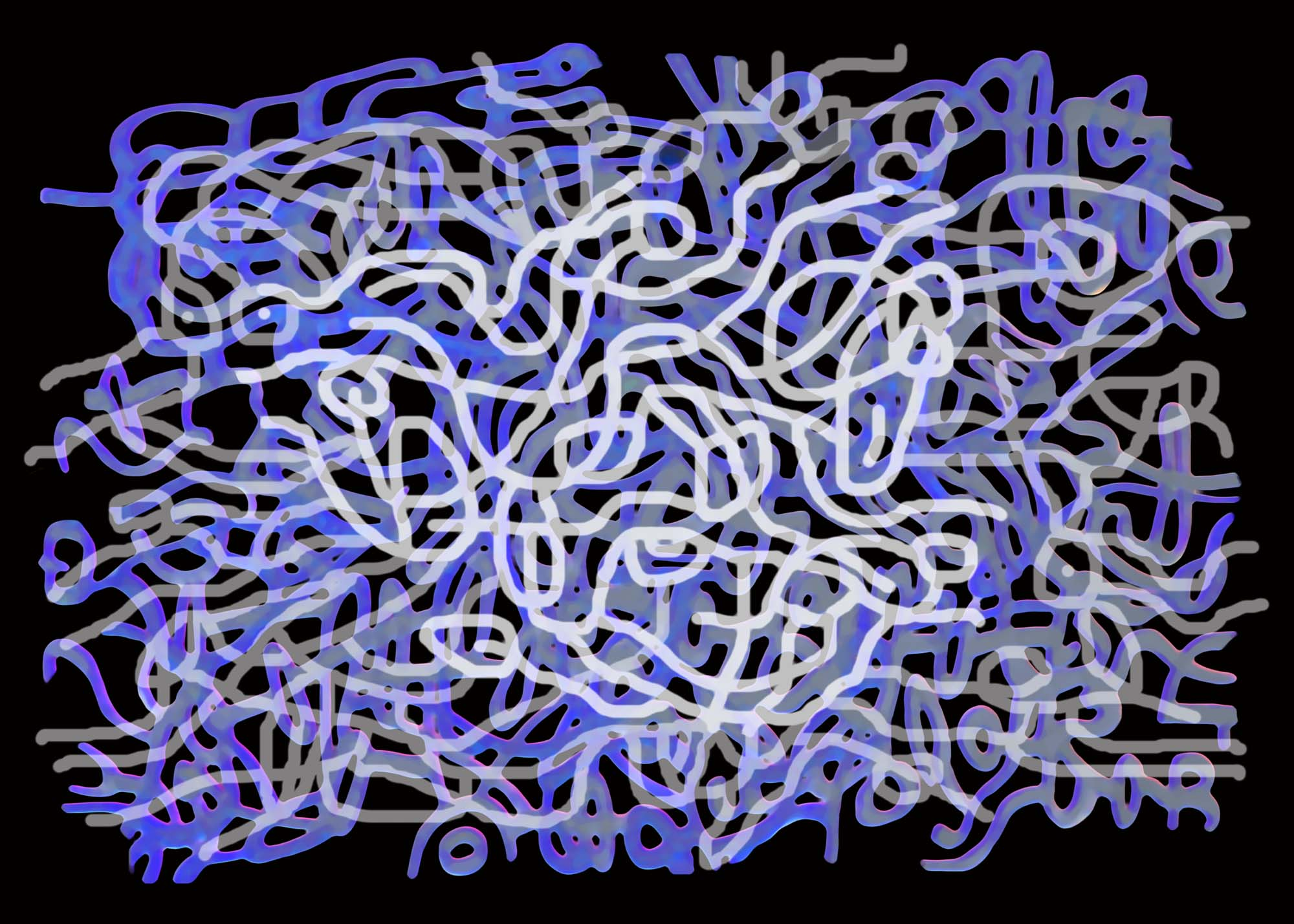
Ballade, 2016, pigmented print on paper

Since 2016, drawing has become Mnatsakanian's favorite medium. Drawings are the continuation of the Marks, but in black ink usually and without layers. In 2018 the drawings and paintings evolved in three dimensions. Mnatsakanian created three-dimensional drawings using laser-cut wood.

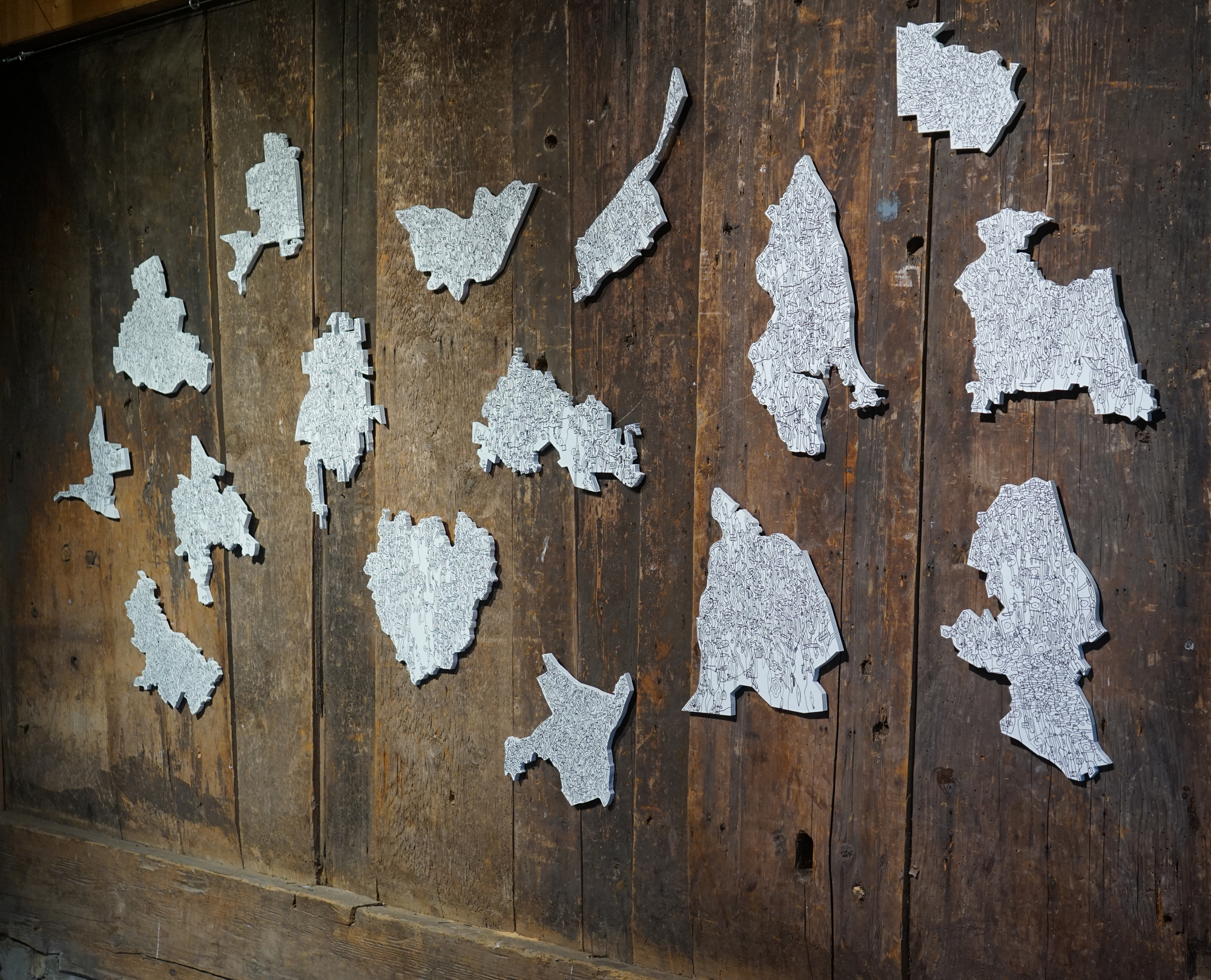
Connexions Insolites, Installation, 2017, acrylic on wood

== Awards and residencies ==
- 2014 City and Canton of Neuchâtel for “Come Closer” at the Moderne art museum, Yerevan, Armenia
- 2012 The Swiss Agency for Development and Cooperation (SDC) for "Our cyclopean walls"
- 2012 Residency at Art and Cultural Studies Laboratories (ACSL), Armenia
- 2009 California State University, Fullerton, residency at the Grand Central Art Station, Santa Ana, California
- 2009 Etat de Neuchâtel, Service de la cohesion multiculturelle for “Our Storis/Nos Histoires”
- 2008 Office fédéral de la culture, Artists-in-Labs residency at Dalle Molle Institute for Artificial Intelligence, Lugano
- 2007 Office fédéral de la culture (Swiss ministry of culture) for “The mountain comes to me”
- 2003 California Council for the Humanities for “Our Stories”

== Public collections ==
- City of Neuchâtel, Switzerland
- Haute école de géstion Arc, Neuchâtel, Switzerland
- Haute école d’ingénierie, St-Imier, Switzerland
- Musée d’art et d’histoire Neuchâtel, Switzerland
- Musée des beaux-arts, La Chaux-de-Fonds, Switzerland
- Bibliothèque publique et universitaire de Neuchâtel, Switzerland
