= Arshaguhi Teotig =

Arshaguhi Teotig Արշակուհի Թեոդիկ
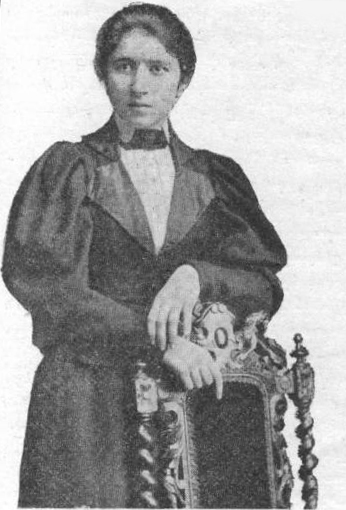
- Born: 1875; Ortakoy, Constantinople, Ottoman Turkey
- Died: 1922 (aged 46–47); Lausanne, Switzerland
- Occupations: Writer, publisher, educator, translator, social worker, and philanthropist.

Arshaguhi Teotig (Armenian: Արշակուհի Թեոդիկ, 1875–1922) was an Armenian social worker, educator, publicist, writer, and translator.

== Life ==
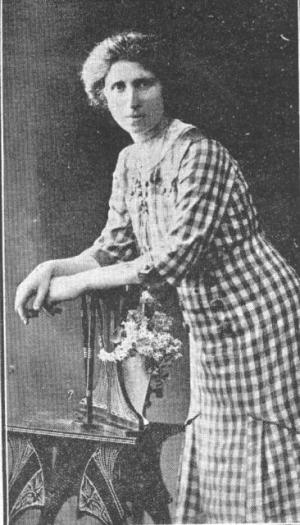

Arshaguhi Teotig was born Arshaguhi Cezveciyan in the Ortaköy district of Istanbul in 1875. Her father Bedros Cezveciyan was an owner of publishing house in Ottoman capital Istanbul. She get her primary education at the Nunyan-Varduhyan College of the Samatya district in 1895. She traveled to England and studied at the Westland high school in Scarborough. After graduating from Westland, she went to Paris to continue her studies. She contributed to G. Lusinyan's French–Armenian dictionary as a researcher of words and meanings. In 1898 she returned to Istanbul and continued her studies at the Üsküdar Jemaran Armenian College and Seminary. She began her career as a writer in newspapers and journals such as Hayganush Mark's Tsaghig (Flower), Manzume, Surhantak (Messenger), Byzantium, Jamanak (Time) newspaper. She also participated in the Polis Hayivare editorial magazine.

In 1902 she married renowned Armenian writer and publicist Teotig. After her husband was imprisoned and subsequently sent to Der Zor, Arshaguhi Teotig became gravely ill. Arshaguhi Teotig was subsequently sent to Lausanne, Switzerland where she managed to live until 1922. It has been said that her last words were "All of us are victims", referring to the Armenian genocide.

== Work ==
Arshaguhi Teotig was part of the Azkanver Hayuhyats Engerutyuni, an Armenian organization that supported the construction, maintenance, and operations of Armenian girl schools throughout the heavily Armenian populated districts of the Ottoman Empire. In 1909, the organization received word about the Adana massacre and were compelled to help in any way possible. Arshaguhi went to Adana and was appalled by the scene. She then returned to Istanbul and published the paper and short book A Month in Cilicia in 1910. This was an eyewitness account of the situation in Adana. Arshaguhi Teotig also assisted her husband in his Amenuyn Daretyutsi periodical works.
