= Chavarche Missakian =

Armenian revolutionary journalist

- Շաւարշ Միսաքեան
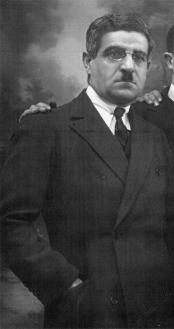
- Chavarche Missakian, Feb.1928
- Born: 1884; Zmara, Ottoman Empire
- Died: January 26, 1957 (aged 72–73); Neuilly-sur-Seine, France
- Resting place: Cimetière du Père-Lachaise
- Citizenship: Ottoman, French
- Occupations: Journalist, Intellectual, Politician
- Spouse: Dirouhie Azarian
- Children: Arpik Missakian

Chavarche Missakian (Armenian: Շաւարշ Միսաքեան), born in 1884 in Zmara or Zimmara (Ottoman Empire) and died on January 26, 1957, in Neuilly-sur-Seine, was an Armenian journalist and intellectual known for founding and leading the Armenian newspaper Haratch in Paris from 1925 to 1957.

== Biography ==
=== Time in the Ottoman Empire ===
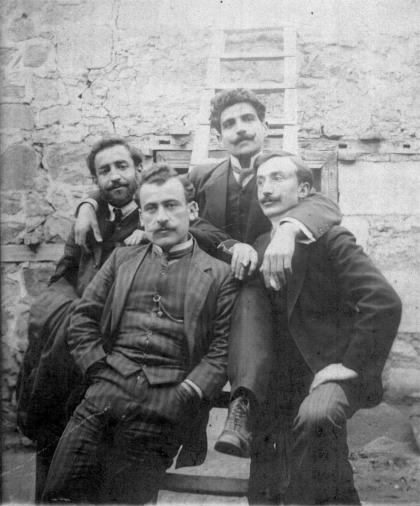
Chavarche Missakian (Centre), 26 November 1911; Erzurum.

Chavarche Missakian was born in 1884 in Zmara, near Sivas, in the Armenian province of the Ottoman Empire. He grew up in Constantinople and studied at the Armenian Guétronagan High School, beginning his journalism career at 16. Starting as a jack-of-all-trades and columnist for the Armenian daily Sourhandak, he published revolutionary literature and worked for the Dashnak newspapers Droschak and Razmig.

In 1908, after the Young Turk Revolution, he co-founded the literary weekly Aztag in Istanbul and established the Ardziv bookstore. He was a member of the Vishap committee of the Armenian Revolutionary Federation (ARF). In 1911, he moved to Garin (Erzurum) to replace the assassinated columnist Yeghiché Topjian for the Dashnak newspaper Haratch and traveled to the regions of Moush and Sassoun with an armed escort led by Stepan Zorian.

Missakian escaped the roundup of Armenian intellectuals in Constantinople on April 24, 1915, and lived in hiding. During this time, he sent information to the newspaper Hayastan in Sofia about the atrocities committed against Armenians, recognizing the unique nature of the genocide. Betrayed by a Bulgarian spy, he was arrested on March 26, 1916, where he was imprisoned and tortured. He was sentenced to death, but the sentence was commuted to five years in prison. He was released after the Armistice of Mudros.

After the war, he became editor-in-chief of the Istanbul daily Djagadamard, the ARF's daily. In 1919, he participated in the ninth ARF Congress in Yerevan and was elected to the Parliament of the First Republic of Armenia.

=== Exile to France ===
In November 1922, Chavarche Missakian was forced to exile in Sofia, where he married Dirouhie Azarian (1891–1964), a teacher in Dörtyol in 1913 and later an accountant for the newspaper Djagadamard. In November 1924, the ARF sent him to Paris to invigorate the newly formed Armenian community and participate in the 10th ARF Congress (November 1924 - January 1925). During the Congress, he was elected to the ARF Bureau, a position he held until 1933. He also contributed to the ARF newspaper Troshak in Paris in the late 1920s, alongside Arshag Jamalian and Simon Vratsian.

Shortly after, on August 1, 1925, he founded the Armenian-language daily Haratch. The newspaper operated uninterrupted until the Occupation when Missakian, a committed socialist, voluntarily ceased its publication in opposition to Nazism and resumed it after the Liberation. His wife contributed under the pseudonyms Sossi or Nodji. In 1942–1943, he published the clandestine magazine Haygachên (2 issues), followed by Aradzani (3 issues) in 1944–1945.

In 1945, Missakian organized the Armenian youth in France by founding Nor Séround and providing them with a newspaper, Haïastan, which is still published today. After World War II, as the USSR encouraged the immigration of diaspora Armenians to Soviet Armenia to compensate for wartime losses, Missakian tried to dissuade potential emigrants by warning them of likely disappointments, advising them to accept the "rose with thorns."

Chavarche Missakian led Haratch until his death, after which his daughter Arpik Missakian succeeded him. He died on January 26, 1957, in Neuilly-sur-Seine and was buried at Père-Lachaise Cemetery on January 31, 1957.

== Works ==
- Օրեր եւ ժամեր [Jours et heures] (in Armenian). Paris. 1958.
- Face à l'innommable : avril 1915 (translated by Arpik Missakian), Marseille, Éditions Parenthèses, coll. « Diasporales », 2015, 144 p. (ISBN 978-2-86364-299-3)
- Մեծ Եղեռնի առաջին վաւերագրողը [Le premier témoin du Grand crime ], Antélias, Éditions du Catholicossat arménien de Cilicie, 2017, 483 p. (ISBN 978-9953039695)

== Honors ==
- Chavarche-et-Arpik-Missakian Square at the quartier du Faubourg-Montmartre; arrondissement de Paris.
- A temporary exhibition dedicated to him was held from February 6 to 8, 2008, at the Maison des étudiants arméniens.
