= Zmaratha =

Human settlement in Greece

Epirus in antiquity

Zmaratha (Ancient Greek: Zμαράθα) was an ancient Greek city located in the region of Epirus.

== See also ==
- List of cities in ancient Epirus

== Sources ==
- Hansen, Mogens Herman; Nielsen, Thomas Heine (2004). An Inventory of Archaic and Classical Poleis. Oxford and New York: Oxford University Press. ISBN 0198140991.
