= Arpik Missakian =

Armenian-French journalist

- Արփիկ Միսաքեան
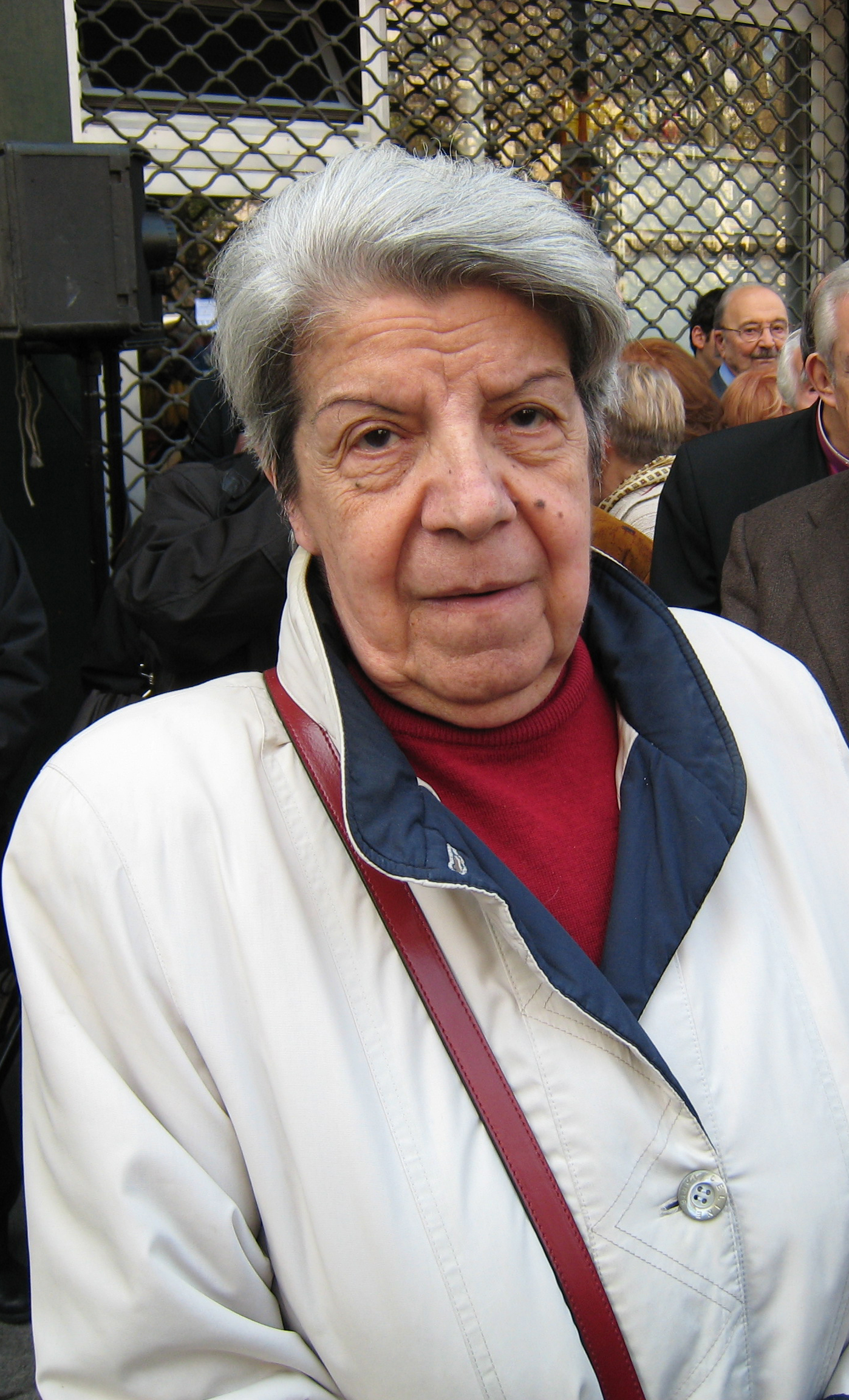
- Born: Arpik Alice Missakian; 1 February 1926; Paris, France
- Died: 19 June 2015 (aged 89); Paris, France
- Resting place: Père Lachaise Cemetery
- Citizenship: French
- Occupation: Journalist
- Employer: Haratch
- Parents: Chavarche Missakian (father); Dirouhie Azarian (mother)

Arpik Missakian (née: Arpik Alice Missakian; February 1, 1926 – June 19, 2015; Armenian Արփիկ Միսաքեան) was a French journalist of Armenian origin. She is known for having been the editor-in-chief of the Armenian-language newspaper Haratch from 1957 to 2009.

== Biography ==
Arpik Missakian was born on February 1, 1926, in Paris. The daughter of journalist and founder of the Haratch newspaper, Chavarche Missakian, Arpik was exposed to the profession from a very young age. She learned the basics and gained practical experience in issues related to printing, distribution, and financial management of a daily newspaper like the one run by her father. Additionally, she learned Western Armenian within the family and by interacting with Armenian intellectuals residing in or passing through Paris. This helped her establish strong connections within the Armenian diaspora in France.

Upon the death of her father in 1957, Arpik Missakian took over the newspaper as its editor-in-chief. She was responsible for launching the monthly literary and artistic supplement titled Midk yèv Arvest (Armenian: Միտք եւ արուեստ, literally "Thought and Art").

Supported from 1984 by another journalist, Arpi Totoyan (b. in 1945 in Istanbul), Arpik Missakian ran the newspaper until 2009, when it ended.

She died on June 19, 2015, in Paris at the age of 89. She was buried in the family vault at Père-Lachaise Cemetery (88th division) on June 25. Her death was mourned by the Armenian community in France, as Arpik Missakian was a pillar of the community.

== Bibliography ==
She translated one of her father Chavarche Missakian's writings from Armenian to French:

- Chavarche Missakian (translated by Arpik Missakian, postface by Krikor Beledian), Face à l'innommable : avril 1915, Marseille, Éditions Parenthèses, coll. "Diasporales", 2015, 144 pages. (ISBN 978-2-86364-299-3, BNF 44315258)

== Documentary about her ==
- Arby Ovanessian, Portrait connu et inconnu, 2019: a documentary filmed in 2009 and part of the documentary film trilogy "Haratch 83" dedicated to the newspaper Haratch. Portrait connu et inconnu includes a lengthy interview with Arpik Missakian. It was first broadcast on October 27, 2019, at the Péniche Anako.

== Honors ==
Since March 2022, Chavarche-et-Arpik-Missakian Square in the 9th arrondissement of Paris has been named in her honor.
