= Abbas Nalbandian =

Iranian writer (1949–1989)

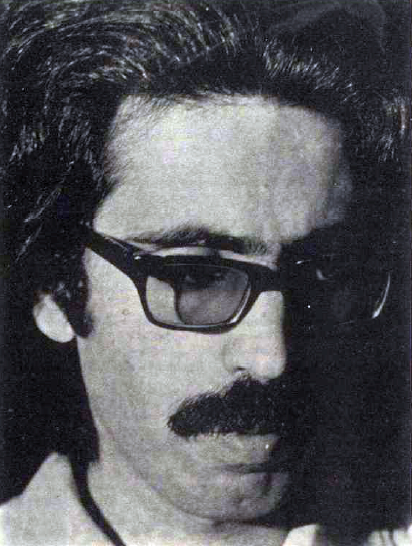
Abbas Nalbandian in 1971

Abbas Nalbandian (Persian: عباس نعلبندیان; 1947 – 28 May 1987) was an Iranian playwright who wrote several absurdist plays in the 1960s and 1970s. His plays had long and unusual titles, one example being that of his first play, “A deep, big and new research about fossils of 25th genealogy period, or 20th, or any other period, there is no difference” (1966). Nalbandian was influenced by European absurdist theatre, incorporating ideas and methods from European drama into Iranian drama. He committed suicide on 28 May 1987, recording his voice at his time of death.

== Partial works ==
- A deep, big and new research about fossils of 25th genealogy period, or 20th, or any other period, there is no difference (1966)
- If Faust was a real friend (1967)
- Research (1968)
- Putting a chair by the window and sitting on it and watching a long, dark, calm, cold night of the desert (1970)
- Suddenly, This God Lover Died in the Love of God, This God Slain Died by the Sword' was too radical for acceptance in my home country (1971)
- Harem (1977)
- Stories from the Rains of Love and Death (1977) [translated to French : 2023 : Quelques histoires des pluies d’amour et de mort, préface de Joseph Danan, trad. du persan par Fahimeh Najmi (en collaboration avec François Rémond), Parlatges : L'Espace d'un instant.]
