= Krikor Beledian =

Armenian poet, novelist, and literary critic

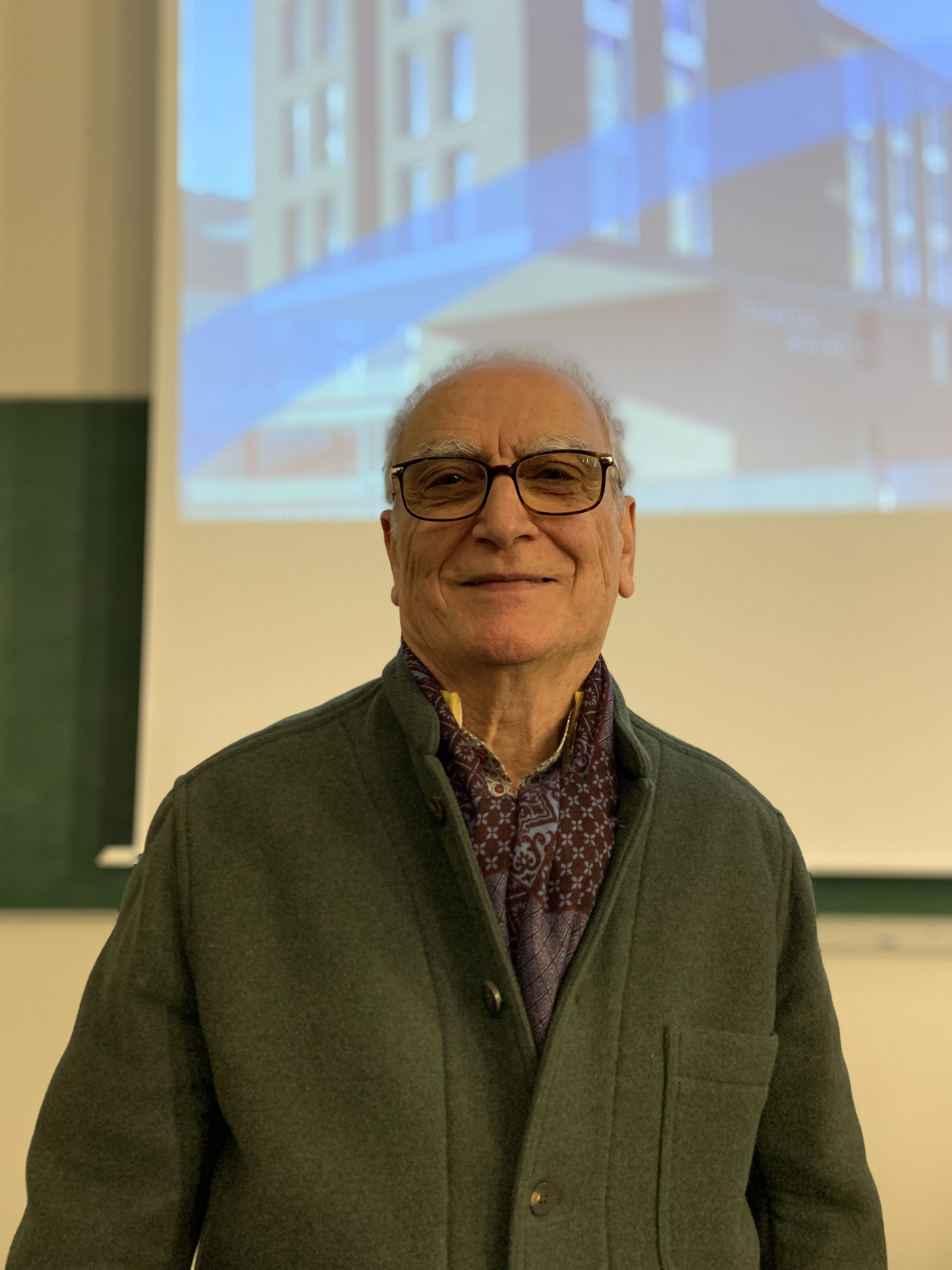
- Krikor Beledian in 2024.
- Born: 1945 (age 80–81); Beirut, Lebanon
- Education: Armenian Lyceum Nshan Palandjian
- Occupations: novelist, poet, literary critic

Krikor Beledian (Armenian: Գրիգոր Պըլտեան, born Beirut, 1945) is a prolific Armenian poet, novelist, and literary critic living in France.

== Biography ==
After graduating from the Armenian Lyceum Nshan Palandjian of Beirut, he moved to Paris in 1967, where he studied philosophy at the Sorbonne. He has written dozens of volumes of poetry, novels, essays and critical works. Beledian lives in Paris and taught for many years at the INALCO (Institut national de langues et civilisations orientales), as well as the Catholic University of Lyon.

Beledian's work has been published in Lebanon, Armenia, France, and in the United States. Some of his essays have been published in journals and book chapters in English. Section from his 13-part Unpeopled Language (Անժողովուրդ լեզու) were published in Los Angeles Review of Books, and Asymptote.

== Selected works ==
- Հակաքերթուած (Antipoem, 1972; English transl. 1979)
- Հատուածներ «Սենեակ»ի մասին (1972)
- Տեղագրութիւն քանդուող քաղաքի մը համար (Topography for a City Being Destroyed, 1976)
- Objets & Débris (1978)
- Տրամ (Firm, 1980)
- Գրիգոր Նարեկացի լեզուի սահմաններուն մէջ (Grigor Narekatsi within the Limits of Language, 1985)
- Մանտրաներ (Mantras, 1986)
- Վայրեր (Places, 1986)
- Կրակէ շրջանակը Դանիէլ Վարուժանի շուրջ (The Fire Circle Around Daniel Varoujan, 1988)
- Էր (Was, 1992)
- Հատուածներ հօր (1993)
- Ելք. մանտրաներ Բ. շարք (Exodus: Mantras, 2nd series, 1993)
- Les Arméniens (1994)
- Մարտ (Fight, 1997)
- Ի գործ արկանել (To Put Into Action, 1997)
- Սեմեր (Thresholds, 1997)
- Հարուածը (The Hit, 1998)
- Դէպի մեծ փոխաբերութիւն (Toward the Grand Metaphor, 1999)
- Զրոյցներ բանաստեղծութեան մասին (Conversations about Poetry, 1999)
- Նշան (Sign, 2000)
- Cinquante ans de littérature arménienne en France, 1922-1972 (Fifty years of Armenian Literature in France, 2001)
- Պատկերը (The Image, 2003)
- Անունը լեզուիս տակ (The Name Under My Tongue, 2003)
- Երկուք (Two, 2005)
- Avis de recherche : une anthologie de poésie arménienne contemporaine (Wanted: Anthology of Contemporary Armenian Poetry, 2006)
- Երկխօսութիւն Նարեկացիի հետ (Dialogue with Narekatsi, 2008)
- Հայկական ֆուտուրիզմ (Armenian Futurism, 2009)
- Մանտրաներ (Mantras, 2010)
- Շրջում (Inversion, 2012)
- Տարմ (Flock, 2015)
- Կրկնագիր մարդը (The Palimpsest Man, 2015)
- Ինչ որ չես տեսներ (That Which You Don't See, 2016)
- Fifty Years of Armenian Literature in France (English edition, 2016)
