= Nor Haratch =

- Nor Haratch front page (26 July 2012)
- Type: Three times a week newspaper Tuesdays, Thursdays and Saturdays
- Owner(s): SARL Nor Haratch
- Founded: 27 October 2009
- Language: Armenian
- Headquarters: 83, rue d'Hauteville - 75010 Paris
- Website: www.norharatch.com

Masthead of first issue of Nor Haratch

Nor Haratch (Armenian: Նոր Յառաջ) is an Armenian newspaper based in France. It was initially published twice a week (every Tuesday and Friday). In 2010 it started to be published thrice a week (every Tuesday, Thursday and Saturday).

Nor Haratch was founded in 2009 in response to the closing of the independent daily Haratch, the longest-running French-Armenian publication, founded by Schavarch Missakian in 1925 and continued by his daughter Arpik Missakian since 1957, whose last issue appeared with the date May 30–31, 2009.

Five months after Haratch ceased publication, a group of intellectuals started the publication of Nor Haratch (literally New Forward). A limited liability company was established as owner. The first issue of Nor Haratch was published on 27 October 2009. The editorial staff included Haroutiun Gobelian (Executive Editor), Jiraïr Tcholakian (Director of Publication), Nora Baroutjian and Aram Kerovpyan, and correspondents in Armenia and the Middle East. With its new, independent staff, administration and ownership, Nor Haratch should be considered a separate new publication, rather than a continuation of the historical Haratch.

== Hebdo Nor Haratch ==
A French language weekly supplement, entitled Hebdo Nor Haratch, was added in 2011.
