= Teotig =

Armenian publisher and writer

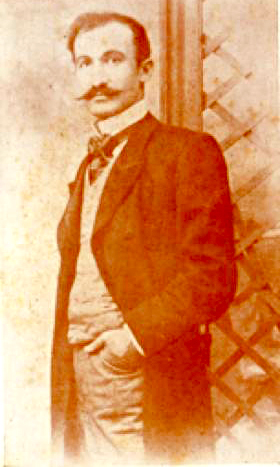
Teotig in 1905

Teotoros "Teotig" Labdjindjian (Armenian: Թեոդորոս "Թէոդիկ" Լապճինճեան, 1873; Üsküdar, Constantinople (Istanbul), Ottoman Empire – 1928; Paris, France) was an Armenian writer and publisher best known for his Armenian language almanac, Amenun Daretsuytsi (in Armenian Ամէնուն Տարեցոյցը meaning "Everyone’s Almanac"). It was published annually, mostly in Constantinople, between 1907 and 1929.

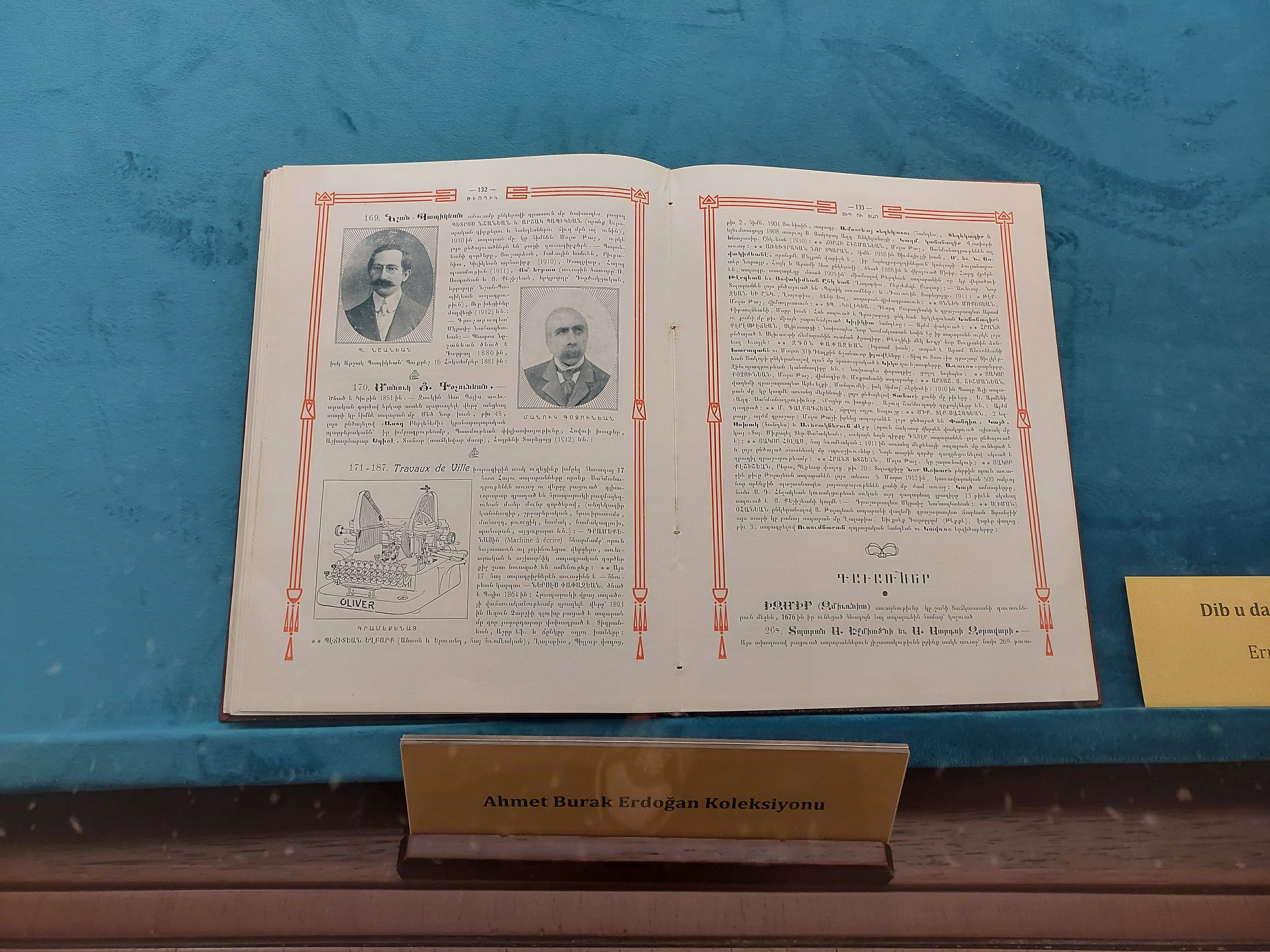
Dib u Dar (1912)

Teotig was born in 1873 to Armenian parents in Üsküdar, a district of Constantinople situated on the Asiatic side of the Bosphorus. He married writer Arşaguhi Cezveciyan in 1902. Aside from his yearly Almanac production, Teotig was also known for his "Golgotha of the Armenian Clergy", a compilation of sources analyzing the priests, clergymen, and monks who were massacred during the Armenian genocide. He ended up compiling and documenting 1252 witnesses to the massacres of the clergy. Teotig was assisted in his enterprise by his British-educated wife, Arshaguhi Teotig (1875-1921)—herself a writer and educator—until her death.

Teotig himself was deported during the Armenian genocide and managed to survive. After returning to Constantinople in 1922 and on the eve of its occupation by the army of Mustafa Kemal, he followed with other intellectuals such as Levon Tutundjian, Arshag Boyadjian and Armenak der Hagopian the orphans transported to Corfu by the Near East Relief on a ship. He stayed in Corfu until at least 1925 publishing articles in the press and corresponding with Tutundjian who had left in 1924 for Lausanne, in Switzerland [Source: Tutundjian Fund 413, Central Historical Archive of the Republic of Armenia, Yerevan. File 601-603]. He then left in turn for Nicosia, and Paris, with the last of his yearbooks being printed in Venice, Vienna, and Paris. He died in May 1928 in Paris, when the 18th volume of his yearbooks (his "paper children", as he called them) was in press. His son Vahakn Theotig died in the United States in 1962.
