= Haratch =

Armenian daily newspaper based in France

- Type: Daily newspaper
- Format: Berliner
- Owner(s): Arpik Missakian
- Editor: Arpik Missakian
- Founded: 1925 by Schavarch Missakian
- Language: Armenian
- Headquarters: 83, rue d'Hauteville, 75010 Paris

Haratch, Vol. 1, Issue 1 (2 August 1925)

Haratch, final issue #22,214 (30-31 May 2009)

Haratch ('Forward') (Armenian: Յառաջ) was an Armenian daily newspaper based in France. Haratch was founded in 1925 by Schavarch Missakian.

== History ==
The newspaper was famous for attracting high-profile names in Armenian literature and journalism, including Shahan Shahnour, Schavarch Nartouni, Zareh Vorpuni, Hrach Zartarian, Nshan Beshiktashlian, and Hrant Samuel.

After the migration of Armenians from the area of Musa Dagh (incorporated to Turkey in 1938) to Lebanon, who settled in the area of Anjar, Lebanon, in 1940, the initiative and efforts of editor Schavarch Missakian organized a contribution campaign among Armenians living in France. As a result, the "Haratch" Elementary School was built next to the newly established St. Paul church in the village. The school, officially opened in 1941, was considered a gift from the Armenians living in France. It was later renamed "Haratch Calouste Gulbenkian Secondary School."

Haratch ceased publication on 9 June 1940 because of the Nazi occupation of France and resumed publication on 8 April 1945 after the liberation of the country.

On 26 January 1957, the founder of the paper, Schavarch Missakian, died, and his daughter Arpik Missakian assumed the responsibilities of publisher and editor-in-chief.

In 1976 Haratch added a monthly supplement of literature and the arts, entitled Midk yèv Arvest (Armenian: Միտք եւ Արուեստ).

Due to decreasing readership (circulation in the last years had fallen to less than one thousand copies), Arpik Missakian, owner and editor-in-chief, decided to close it down. The last issue (22,214) of "Haratch" was published with the date 30–31 May 2009.

Five months after the demise of the daily, a new group of intellectuals started publishing Nor Haratch. The first issue of Nor Haratch was published on 27 October 2009. With its new, independent staff, administration and ownership, Nor Haratch should be considered a separate new publication, rather than a continuation of the original Haratch.

== Notes ==
- Nor Haratch, pdf of issue No.1 dated 27 October 2009
