= Zareh Vorpuni =

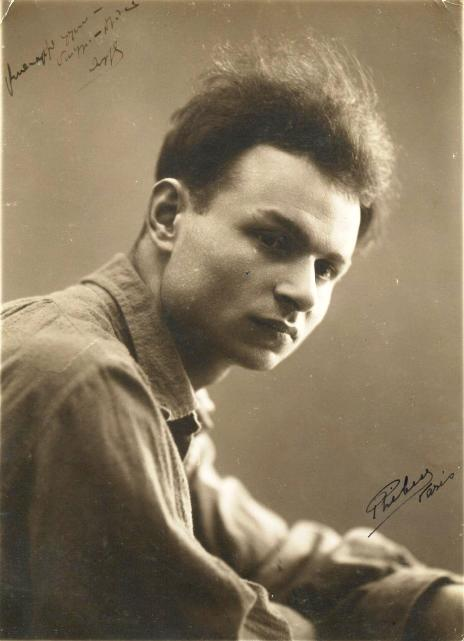

Zareh Vorpouni (Armenian: Զարեհ Որբունի; May 24, 1902 in Ordu, Ottoman Empire – December 1, 1980 in Paris, France) was an Armenian novelist, editor, and writer.

== Translation ==
Zareh Vorpouni's first work to appear in English translation is The Candidate: A Novel, translated by Jennifer Manoukian and Ishkhan Jinbashian (Syracuse, NY: Syracuse University Press, 2016). In the translator's introduction, Manoukian writes, "From this footnote has emerged a translation that resists, much like in the spirit of the original. It resists the isolation and insularity of literature written in a minority language; it resists the idea that culture in diaspora is fossilized, stagnant, or in decline; and it resists the notion that Armenians have only their century-old plight to offer the world outside their national cocoon." Vorpouni was also featured in the April 2020 issue of Asymptote in which Manoukian explores his use of the "new novel."
