= Nshan Beshiktashlian =

Armenian poet, writer, satirist, and novelist (1898-1972)

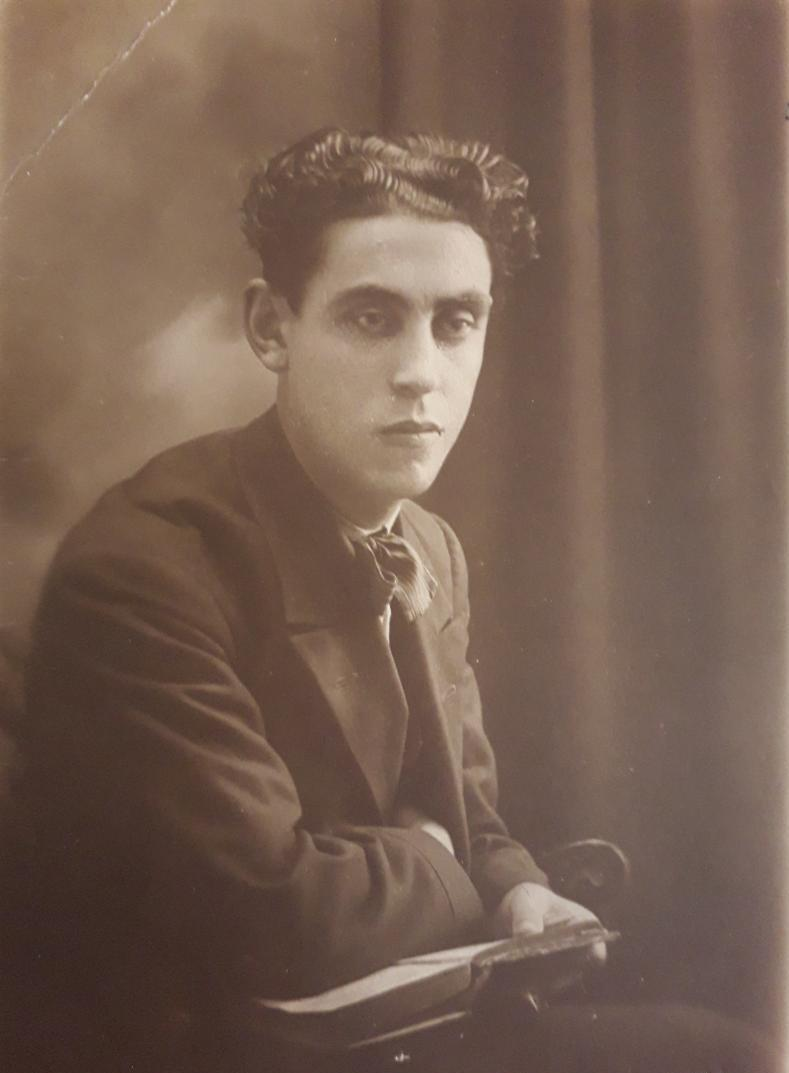
- Nshan Beshiktashlian in Paris in 1930.
- Born: 1898; Istanbul, Ottoman Empire
- Died: 1972 (aged 73–74); Paris, France
- Occupations: poet, writer, satirist, and novelist

Nshan Beshiktashlian (Armenian: Նշան Պէշիկթաշլեան, born in Istanbul, Ottoman Empire, 1898 - died Paris, France, 1972) was an Armenian poet, writer, satirist, and novelist.

== Biography ==
Nshan Beshiktashlian was born in Istanbul and left at an early age. Due to his abrupt leave, he was forced to leave school at an early age. However, he began to write at 12 years old with his satirical style of writing. He left Istanbul and continued his writing career in Paris, France where he remained until his death in 1972.
