= Christianization of Armenia =

Conversion of country to Christianity

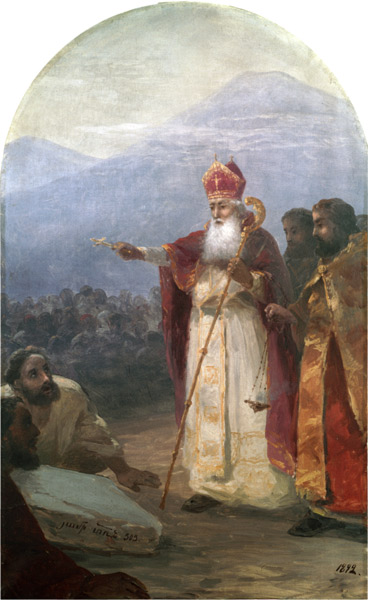
The Baptism of the Armenian People (1892), by Ivan Aivazovsky

Christianity first spread to Armenia prior to the official adoption of the faith in the Kingdom of Greater Armenia in the early fourth century, although the details are obscure. Greater Armenia was the first state (or one of the first states) to adopt Christianity as its state religion. The Arsacid king of Armenia at the time, Trdat, was converted by Gregory the Illuminator, who became the first head of the Armenian Church. The traditional date for the conversion of Armenia is 301, although alternative dates have been proposed by scholars ranging from 284 to no later than 325. While Armenia's church structure was established at this time, it took longer for Christianity to fully take root in the country. The greatest progress came after the invention of the Armenian alphabet by Mesrop Mashtots and the translation of the Bible and liturgy into Armenian in the fifth century.

The Christianization of Armenia is regarded as one of the most important events in Armenian history, significantly shaping the people's identity, and turning Armenia away from its centuries-long links to the Iranian world. Additionally, the Armenian Church is considered to have provided a structure for the preservation of Armenian identity in the absence of Armenian political independence.

== Background ==
Prior to Christianization, Armenians mostly practiced a syncretic form of Zoroastrianism (probably adopted during the Achaemenid period) with significant native Armenian and other religious elements. The Kingdom of Greater Armenia had been ruled by members of the Parthian Arsacid dynasty since the first century AD. Armenia largely managed to maintain an independent existence between its two powerful neighbors, the Parthian and Roman empires, which had reached a compromise in the first century whereby Armenia would be ruled by an Arsacid prince who would be confirmed by Rome.

The overthrow of the Parthian dynasty in Iran and the rise of the Sasanians in the third century dramatically changed the political situation. Conflict between Rome and Iran intensified, while the Armenian Arsacids entered into a "family feud" with the Sasanians to avenge their overthrown Parthian kinsmen. As a result, Armenia became more closely aligned with the Roman Empire and was attacked and at times occupied by the Sasanians. A period of Sasanian occupation ended with the restoration of the Arsacid Trdat III (who later converted to Christianity) to the throne of Greater Armenia during the reign of Diocletian (r. 284–305). This possibly occurred in 298/9, coinciding with the Peace of Nisibis, which followed a Roman victory over the Sasanians; however, other dates have been proposed for Trdat's restoration.

== Early spread of Christianity ==
Christianity began to spread in Armenia before the kingdom's conversion in the early fourth century, first coming from the religion's birthplace in Judea via Syria and Mesopotamia. Some traditions tell of evangelizing by Addai of Edessa in the first century, while others claim that the apostles Thaddeus and Bartholomew preached in Armenia. Thaddeus is said to have come to proselytize in Armenia, where he was martyred by the Armenian king Sanatruk at Artaz, near Maku. Later, this story was connected to that of Gregory the Illuminator by placing his conception at Thaddeus' tomb. However, these traditions, which establish apostolic succession for the Armenian Church, are considered apocryphal.

In the second century, the church father Tertullian described the Armenians as a people who had received Christianity. Tertullian lists various people who have accepted religion but the list is a verbatim quotation from Acts 2.9 where in the place of Armenia the Greek text has Judaea. Ancient writers proposed names of other countries. Tertullian and Augustine have Armenia, Jerome has Syria, John Chrysostom has India, and Eusebius omits it, so Tertullian's evidence is to be rejected.

In the mid-third century, Bishop Dionysius of Alexandria wrote a letter to an Armenian bishop called Meruzanes, which suggests that a considerable Christian community existed in Armenia by this time. The location of Meruzanes is not known for certain. Based on the bishop's name, Nicholas Adontz argues that he was located in district of Sophene in southern Armenia. (Note: Meruzanes (Armenian Meruzhan) was a dynastic name of the Artsruni dynasty, which ruled over Sophene.)

The southern districts of Armenia were ruled by autonomous principalities or satrapies which entered the Roman orbit after the Peace of Nisibis in 299. Nina Garsoïan suggests that the traditional identification of Armenia as the first Christian state may actually reflect the early conversion of the southern satrapies, which were viewed as sovereign Armenian states.

Thus, Christianity came to Armenia in two successive currents: a Syriac current coming to the country's southern regions from the south via Syria and Mesopotamia, and a later Greek current coming to the Arsacid kingdom of Armenia from the west via Asia Minor in the early fourth century.

=== Jude Thaddeus the Apostle ===
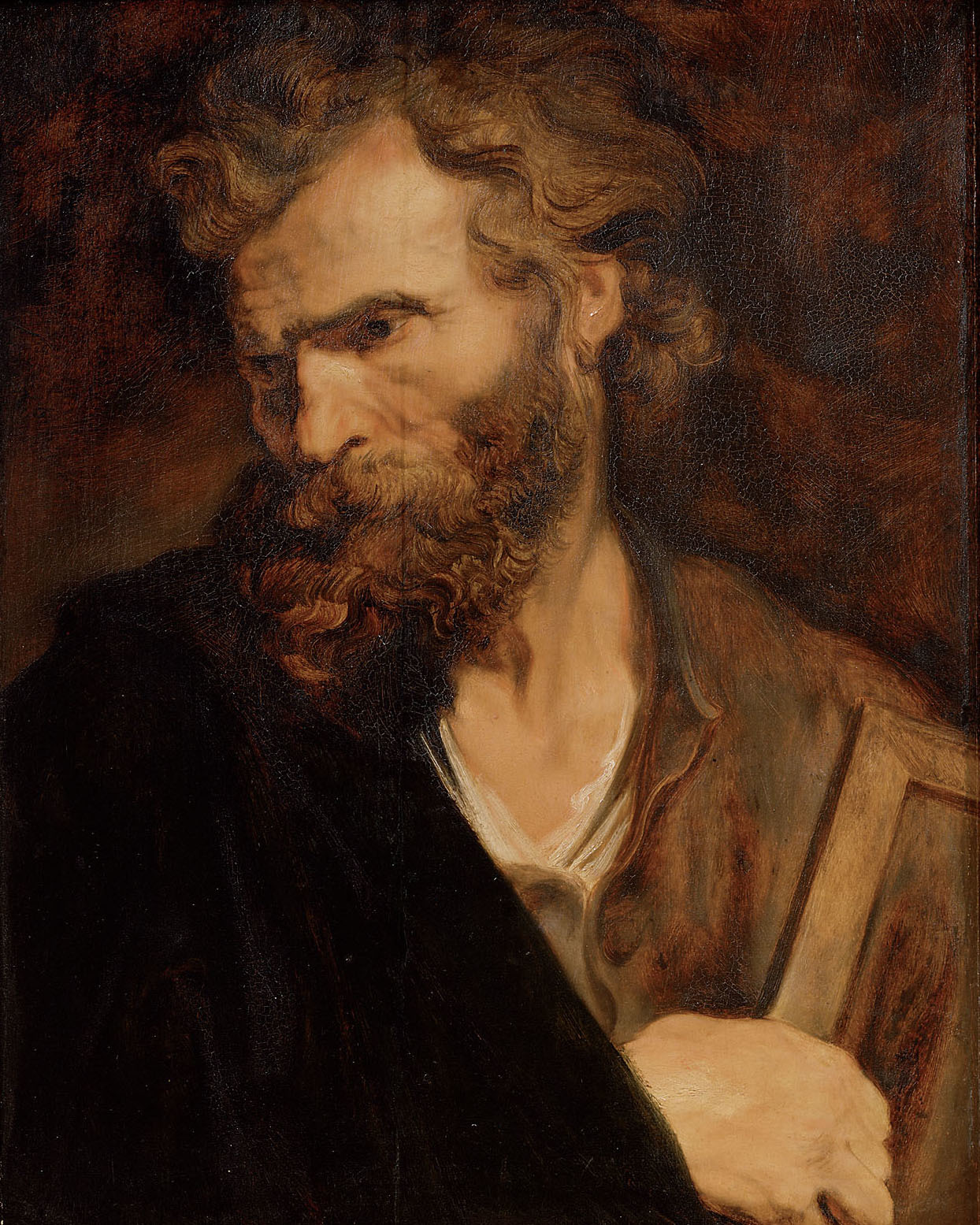
Jude Thaddeus the Apostle

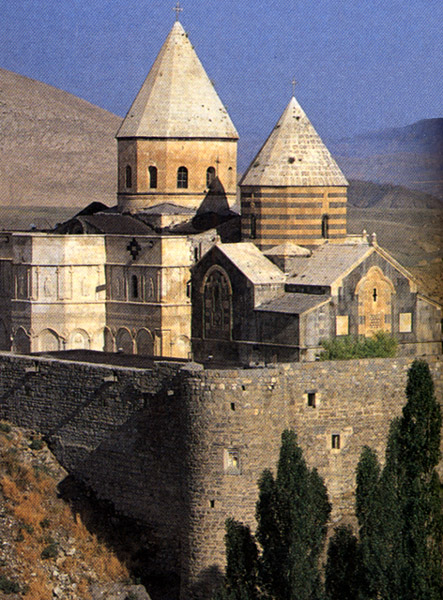
St. Thaddeus Monastery: The First Church of Armenia

The Armenian historian Movses Khorenatsi identifies the Gentiles mentioned in the Gospel of John as Armenian dignitaries sent by King Abgar of Edessa (whom Khorenatsi calls an Armenian king). According to this account, these envoys petitioned Christ to visit Edessa and heal the ailing monarch. Although Jesus did not travel in person, he reportedly promised to send a disciple in his stead. Following the Ascension, the Apostle Thaddeus arrived in Edessa, where his preaching and miraculous healings led to Abgar's conversion. While some traditions distinguish between the Apostle Thaddeus and Thaddeus Didymus (one of the Seventy-two Disciples), Armenian historiography attributes these acts to the Apostle himself. After establishing the church in Edessa and consecrating Addai as bishop, Thaddeus traveled to Mardistan under a royal mandate. There, he approached the court of King Sanatruk (Abgar's nephew). Although the Apostle initially succeeded in converting Sanatruk to Christianity, the King eventually apostatized, renouncing his new faith under intense pressure from the Armenian nobility.

Through Thaddeus's ministry, numerous members of the royal court embraced Christianity, including the King's own daughter, Sandukht. Upon learning of these conversions, Sanatruk ordered the execution of the converts and the arrest of both the Princess and the Apostle. Legend holds that Thaddeus was miraculously released, allowing him to provide spiritual solace to the imprisoned Princess and the Christian community. Despite continued persecution, Thaddeus persisted in his mission until he was eventually recaptured. According to the hagiographic tradition of the Armenian Apostolic Church, Thaddeus suffered martyrdom in AD 66 in Armenia by the order of Armenia's King Sanatruk, along with Bartholomew the Apostle and Saint Sandukht. According to this tradition, his tomb is located at the Monastery of Saint Thaddeus in Qareh Kelisa, West Azerbaijan Province, Iran.

=== Bartholomew the Apostle ===
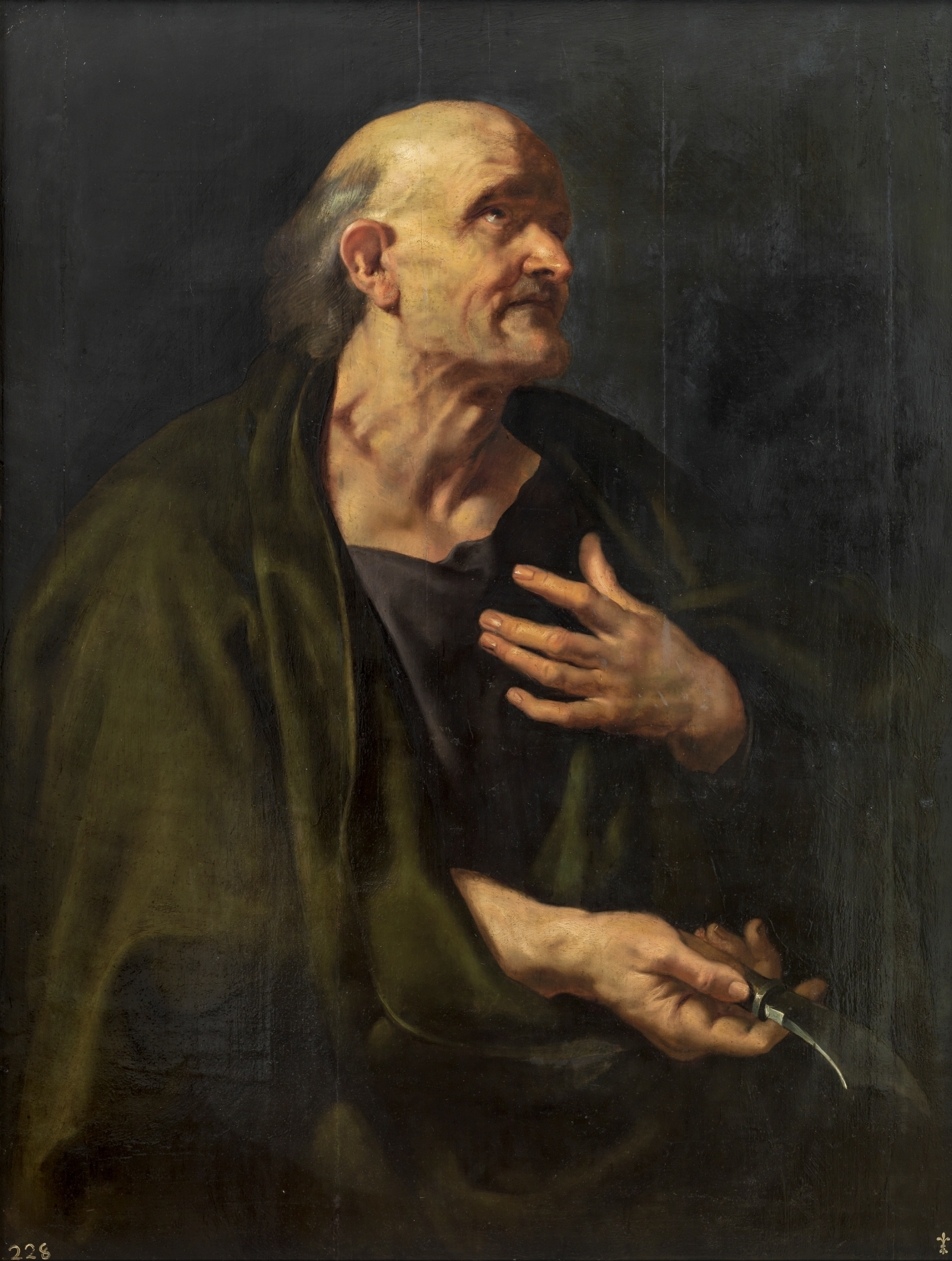
Bartholomew the Apostle

Along with his fellow apostle Jude "Thaddeus", Bartholomew is reputed to have brought and preach Christianity to Armenia in the 1st century. Thus, both saints are considered the patron saints of the Armenian Apostolic Church. According to these traditions, Bartholomew is the second Catholicos-Patriarch of the Armenian Apostolic Church.

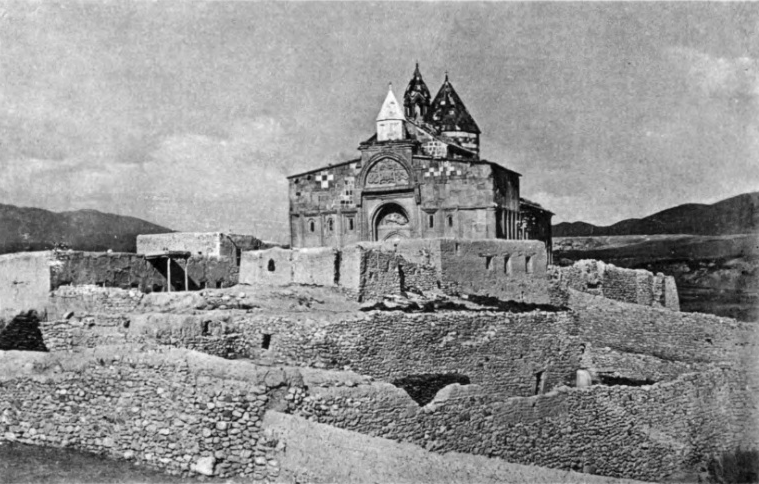
Saint Bartholomew Monastery

Christian tradition offers three accounts of Bartholomew's death: "One speaks of his being kidnapped, beaten unconscious, and cast into the sea to drown."

In the Hellenic tradition, Bartholomew was executed in Albanopolis in Armenia, where he was martyred for having converted Polymius, the local king, to Christianity (no historical Armenian king by this name is known). Enraged by the monarch's conversion, and fearing a Roman backlash, King Polymius's brother, Prince Astyages, ordered Bartholomew's torture and execution. However, this version of the story appears ahistorical, as there are no records of any Armenian king of the Arsacid dynasty of Armenia with the name "Polymius". Other accounts of his martyrdom name the king as either Agrippa (identified with Tigranes VI), or Sanatruk, king of Armenia.

The 13th-century Saint Bartholomew Monastery was a prominent Armenian monastery constructed at the presumed site of Bartholomew's martyrdom in Vaspurakan, Greater Armenia (now in southeastern Turkey).

== Conversion of the Armenian kingdom ==
=== Traditional account ===
16th-century Armenian miniature depicting St. Gregory and King Trdat, transformed into a boar

The traditional account of the Christianization of Armenia comes from The History of the Armenians and The Teaching of St. Gregory, fifth century works attributed to Agathangelos which combine fact and legend. There are Greek, Arabic and Syriac versions which predate the Armenian version.

According to the account of Agathangelos, in the third century the Armenian king, whom Agathangelos calls Khosrov, fought against the newly established Sasanian dynasty in Iran; the latter sought to destroy the Armenian Arsacids as the last remnant of the Parthian dynasty they had supplanted. The Sasanians sent a Parthian nobleman called Anak to gain the confidence of the Armenian king and kill him. Anak succeeded in murdering Khosrov and most of the royal family, but he and his family were then killed by Armenian nobles. After this, Khosrov's son Trdat (Tiridates) was taken to live in Rome, and Anak's son was taken to Caesaria in Cappadocia and raised by Christians, who gave him the name Gregory.

Later, Trdat reclaimed the Armenian throne with Roman assistance. Gregory went to Armenia to enter the service Trdat, who, following his Roman overlord Diocletian, persecuted Christians. After Gregory refused to sacrifice to the goddess Anahit, the king had Gregory imprisoned and subjected to many tortures. Once Trdat discovered that Gregory was the son of his father's killer, he had Gregory thrown into a deep pit called Khor Virap near Artaxata, where he remained for thirteen (or fifteen) years. In the meantime, a group of Christian nuns fleeing from the Roman Empire were put to death on Trdat's orders. In Agathangelos's history, Gregory is miraculously saved and brought out from the pit after Trdat's sister Khosrovidukht sees a vision. Gregory then healed the king, who, Agathangelos writes, had been transformed into a wild boar for his sinful behavior. Trdat and his court accepted Christianity, making Armenia the first state to adopt Christianity as its official religion. (Note: Although, see below for the possibility that the traditional identification of Armenia as the first Christian state actually reflects the conversion of the autonomous Armenian Satrapies in the south of the country.)

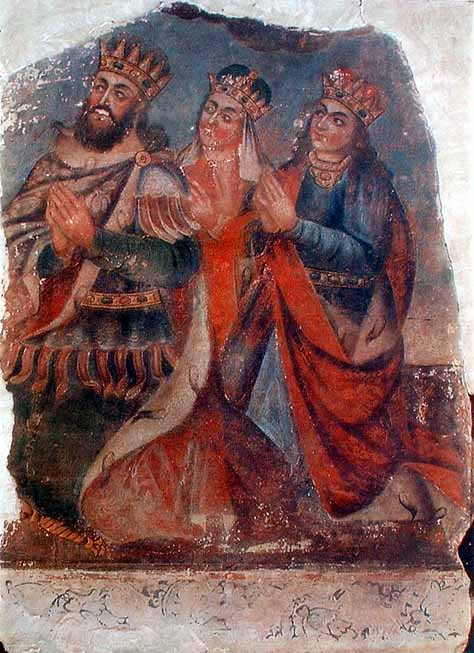
Tiridates III with his wife Ashkhen and sister Khosrovidukht by Naghash Hovnatan.

After being released, Gregory preached the Christian faith in Armenia and erected shrines to the martyred nuns Gayane and Hripsime in Vagharshapat on a spot indicated to him in a vision. (Note: Scholar Robert W. Thomson notes that, although Vagharshapat-Ejmiatsin had "clearly been a holy shrine" from early on in Christian Armenian history, the association of Gregory with Vagharshapat dates from after the partition of Armenia in 387, when the mother see of the Armenian Church moved to Eastern Armenia. The actual original center of the Armenian Church was at Ashtishat.) Vagharshapat later became home to the mother church of Armenian Christianity and, by medieval times, called Ejmiatsin ("descent of the only-begotten") in reference to Gregory's vision. (Note: The figure who appears to Gregory was later identified with Christ in the Armenian tradition, although this is not explicitly stated in Agathangelos.) Gregory, sometimes accompanied by Trdat, went around Armenia destroying pagan temples, defeating the armed resistance of the pagan priests. Gregory then went to Caesarea with a retinue of Armenian princes and was consecrated bishop of Armenia by Leontius of Caesarea. Until the death of Nerses I in the late fourth century, Gregory's successors would go to Caesarea to be confirmed as bishops of Armenia, and Armenia remained under the titular authority of the metropolitans of Caesarea.

Returning to Armenia with Christian assistants from Caesarea, Gregory raised churches in place of the destroyed pagan temples and seized their estates and wealth for the Armenian Church and his house. (Note: According to the fifth-century history attributed to Faustus of Byzantium, by the time of Gregory's descendant Patriarch Nerses I, the domains of the Gregorid house amounted to fifteen districts (gawaṛs).) On the site of the destroyed temple to Vahagn at Ashtishat, Gregory raised a church which became the original center of the Armenian Church and remained so until after the partition of the country in the Peace of Acilisene of 384 and 387. Gregory met King Trdat near the town of Bagavan and baptized the Armenian king, army and people in the Euphrates. In another version of Agathangelos's history surviving only in translation, Gregory also baptizes together with Trdat the kings of Caucasian Albania, Georgia and Lazica/Abkhazia. He founded schools for the Christian education of children, where the languages of instruction were Greek and Syriac. He established the ecclesiastical structure of Armenia, appointing as bishops some of the children of pagan priests.

Now, many of the elements of the Agathangelos narrative are recognized as legendary, although a number of details are supported by other sources. Other sources confirm the leadership of Gregory and his descendants over the early Armenian church, as well as Gregory's consecration by Leontius at Caesarea during a church council in 314. However, the history of Agathangelos depicts the spread of Christianity of Armenia as having occurred practically entirely within Gregory's lifetime, when, in fact, it was a more gradual process that met resistance. Much of the description of Gregory's proselytizing is taken from the information about Mesrop Mashtots's activities in Koriun's Life of Mashtots.

=== Date and causes ===
The traditional date for the conversion of Armenia to Christianity is 301, although many alternative dates have been proposed ranging from 284 to 314. Nicholas Adontz calculated the date as 288, while other scholars proposed 294 and 305 to 307. Cyril Toumanoff writes that when the Roman government embarked upon a new religious policy of toleration and favor to Christianity, the royal Armenian government changed its attitude towards Armenian Christians; it was then that the conversion of the King of Armenia took place and was followed by the episcopal consecration of Gregory the Illuminator at Caesarea in 314 and the subsequent Christianization of Armenia. Robert W. Thomson writes that a date before 314 for Gregory the Illuminator's consecration in Cappadocia is "highly implausible", but it must have occurred no later than 325, when his son and successor Aristakes attended the Council of Nicaea.

Many modern scholars favor the 314 dating. Interpretations that favor an earlier date for Trdat's conversion argue that the Armenian king had grown disillusioned with his alliance with Rome and stopped following Diocletian's anti-Christian policy, instead adopting Christianity to strengthen the state and further separate Armenia from Rome and Persia. Those who favor the later date of 314 argue that Trdat, as a loyal client-king of Rome, could not have set up Christianity as Armenia's state religion in contradiction to Rome's anti-Christian policy at the time, and place the conversion after the Edict of Milan in 313. According to one view, Trdat and his court may have privately converted to Christianity in 301, but only made it the kingdom's official religion after the Edict of Milan. Another source in favor of the 301 dating argues that the Roman Empire, though still anti-Christian, tolerated Armenia's conversion to Christianity since it was directed against Sasanian Iran. Abraham Terian takes the information in Eusebius' Church History about the Roman emperor Maximinus Daza fighting a war with the Christian Armenians in 311 to be evidence that Trdat had converted prior to that date.

George Bournoutian identifies "external pressures, especially from Zoroastrian Persia and its new and zealous Sasanid dynasty" as the main factor in Trdat's decision to adopt Christianity. Mary Boyce writes that Armenia accepted Christianity "partly, it seems, in defiance of the Sasanians." Thomson refers to Trdat's decision as "an act of state" but notes that his personal motivation is still unclear. Suren Yeremian suggested that Trdat converted Armenia as he saw in Christianity "a powerful means to protect Armenia from Persian encroachments and a strong ideological foundation for monarchical power." Similarly, Sen Arevshatyan argues that it was a deliberate state decision driven by geopolitical necessity. With Persian Zoroastrianism, Roman paganism, and Manichaeism all competing for influence within Armenia, Christianity proved "the most favorable religion" for consolidating the restored Arsacid monarchy and neutralizing internal divisions.

=== Greek and Syriac influence on Armenian Christianity in the fourth century ===
As stated by Nina Garsoïan, in the fourth century "Armenia was neither single, nor united, nor altogether foreign to the Persian world." From the early fourth century "Armenia" was made up of several distinct entities: the Arsacid kingdom of Armenia in the north; the autonomous Satrapies of the south which entered the Roman sphere of influence after the Peace of Nisibis in 298; and the province of Armenia Minor, located west of the Euphrates and long a territory of Rome. If the Satrapies may be considered as sovereign Armenian states, it is possible that the traditional identification of Armenia as the first Christian state actually refers to the early conversion of the Satrapies rather than that of Arsacid Armenia. There is evidence of Christianity in the Satrapies by the third century, while Armenia Minor was under the supervision of the bishop of Antioch.

From the time of Gregory the Illuminator, whose consecration at Caesarea in Cappadocia may be plausibly dated to 314, until the beginning of the following century Greek and Syriac were the languages of the Armenian church. The number of those converted in the fourth century in more than name was small: only those who knew some Greek or Syriac really grasped the Christian gospel. The three most significant patriarchs of the fourth century, Gregory, Nerses I the Great and Sahak the Great, had all received a good education in Greek literature.

The first Armenian patriarchate was established at Ashtishat in Taron, west of Lake Van and there was a close connection with the Greek church of Cappadocia, formalized in the requirement that each newly elected Armenian patriarch be actually consecrated in Caesarea in Cappadocia. The first missionaries came from Syria which may be deduced from the Christian Armenian vocabulary. Basic words as "priest", "monk", "sabbath", "hymn", "congregation", "preaching", "fasting" were taken from Syriac. On the other hand, those terms which refer to a more organized church with an established hierarchy, "bishop", "catholicos", "patriarch", were taken from Greek. The Greek connection has left its imprint in the specific activities recorded in the life of Gregory the Illuminator, who was the first bishop consecrated for the Armenian church - an event plausibly dated to 314 or so.

The consecration of Armenian patriarchs at Caesarea of Cappadocia began with Gregory the Illuminator and ended with Nerses I the Great. The one exception was St. Gregory's son Aristakes who was consecrated by his father, this probably occurred before the regularization of episcopal ordinations at the Council of Nicaea. When Nerses I the Great was murdered by the Armenian King Pap in 373/4, Caesarea refused to consecrate his successor.

Despite its assertion of autocephaly the Armenian Church maintained its communion with Constantinople in the fourth and fifth centuries through the consecration of several of Armenian patriarchs, Saint Gregory's descendants and successors, at Caesarea, its recognition of the first three Ecumenical Councils and its acceptance of the imperial Henotikon.

Probably in the late fourth century the patriarchs of Armenia abandoned consecrations at Caesarea of Cappadocia. It was then that the Armenian Church considered itself autocephalous and none of its representatives attended any Ecumenical councils after the Council of Nicaea. Although the Armenian Church accepted the Henotikon in its anti-Chalcedonian interpretation and proclaimed union with the Byzantines at the beginning of the sixth century, it gradually distanced itself from Constantinople until the official and final break at the beginning of the seventh century.

=== Christianization of Armenian society ===
As noted by Thomson, Christianity and the institution of the church spread in Armenia "through the social and political structure indigenous to that country." The church took possession of the extensive properties of the pre-Christian centers of worship. The early Armenian churches were built on the sites of pagan temples. The church properties were held by the patriarch (Note: The term patriarch has commonly been used for Gregory and his successors in Armenian sources since the fifth century, although, as Robert W. Thomson notes, it is anachronistic for the situation in the fourth century. Until the death of Nerses I in the 370s, the Armenian bishops were under the authority of the metropolitans of Caesarea.) and passed down hereditarily like those of the nakharar noble clans. The office of patriarch was seen as the hereditary privilege of the descendants of Gregory the Illuminator—just as the secular offices of state in Armenia were held hereditarily by particular noble families—despite the fact that this went against Christian practice and law. The patriarchate was held by members of the Gregorid line, with some interruptions, until the death of Isaac of Armenia in the fifth century. Early on, bishoprics appear to have been organized on the basis of the nakharar clans, rather than as sees based in major cities. These factors allowed the church to play an independent political role, often clashing with the Arsacid monarchs.

The spread of the Christian faith to the population of Armenia and the elimination of pre-Christian beliefs and practices was a gradual and uneven process. Resistance to Christianization came from both among the common people and the nobility. Armenian magnates who opposed the pro-Roman policies of the monarchy opposed Christianity and adopted Zoroastrianism instead. Gregory's son Vrtanes, who succeeded his brother Aristakes as patriarch, was nearly murdered by pagans at his seat at Ashtishat. In 365, Patriarch Nerses I convened the Council of Ashtishat, which banned pre-Christian practices such as consanguineous marriages, pagan-style funerals involving "excessive lamentations," and polygamy. In the view of Robert W. Thomson, early efforts to spread Christianity to the Armenian population came mainly from local holy men and ascetics, rather than concerted missionary activities by church institutions. Most of these traveling holy men were Syrians or associated with Syria. One of the reasons for the slow spread of Christianity early on was that the liturgy was in recited in Greek or Syriac, and was thus incomprehensible to most Armenians.

It was with the invention of the Armenian alphabet in c. 405 by Mesrop Mashtots, himself an ascetic preacher, that the Christianization of the population began to progress more quickly. The Bible, liturgy, the works of the main church fathers and other Christian texts were translated into Armenian for the first time. In this, Mashtots received help from the king Vramshapuh and the patriarch Isaac. In the middle of the fifth century, the Sasanian king Yazdegerd II attempted to impose a reformed Zoroastrianism on Armenia and faced a Christian rebellion. A substantial party of Armenian nobles sided with the Sasanian king and renounced Christianity, although the Sasanian efforts to root out Armenian Christianity ultimately failed. Still, many elements of the pre-Christian religion became part of Armenian Christianity, and a small group of Armenians called the Arewordikʿ never converted to Christianity, apparently surviving into the modern period.

=== Revisions of the traditional account in later centuries ===
During the Crusades, to spread hope among the Armenians for the restoration of their independence, literature was spread as a mixture of history and prophecy and was attributed to well known Armenian church leaders. This literature was edited and reedited to conform to various political circumstances and was interpolated into some well known Armenian historical works. A prophecy ascribed to catholicos Sahak I the Great was interpolated in the 8th century into Lazar Parpetsi's History of the Armenians. Widely spread in Armenia in the 13th century was a story that after conversion to Christianity Constantine the Great and Pope Sylvester I went to Jerusalem accompanied by Tdat III the Great and Saint Gregory the Illuminator, while there Constantine built the Cathedral of the Holy Sepulcher in Jerusalem and Trdat built the Church of the Nativity in Bethlehem. The Letter of Concord (Dašanc' T'ułt') was written in the Armenian Kingdom of Cilicia by unknown Latinophile Armenians during the 12th or 13th century and was interpolated into the manuscripts of Agathangelos's History of the Armenians. The Letter said that a pact between Trdat the Great and Saint Gregory the Illuminator on one side and Constantine the Great and Pope Sylvester on the other side was made in Rome and that Sylvester ordained Saint Gregory as catholicos and proclaimed the Armenian Church as the coequal of the sees of Jerusalem, Antioch, and Alexandria (Constantinople was omitted). The Letter also said that Sylvester empowered Saint Gregory and his successors to give their consent, chose and ordain the catholicoses of Georgia and Caucasian Albania, and both had to profess their faith to the Armenian catholicos as the chief vicar of the Pope in the East, and that Constantine crowned Trdat as king of Armenia and put Bethlehem under his authority. That peace, prosperity and justice would reign everywhere in the end was the common ending of the stories. The fabrications were motivated by religious and political considerations and hopes for Western aid. Instead there was growing determination to Latinize the Armenian church by the Roman papacy.

In the passage in Book II of the History of the Armenians by Movses Khorenatsi which relates the conversion of Constantine, the strange absence of the account of the conversion of Trdat has been noted. The passage concerning this event would have been eliminated from the original text of Khorenatsi in the 11th or 12th century. As the oldest manuscript of the work is from the 13th–14th century, at the time of the Armenian kingdom of Cilicia and during the Crusades, the absence of the account was in promotion of the conclusion of an alliance with the Westerners on terms that were to be favorable to the Armenians.

== Historical significance ==
The Christianization of Armenia is regarded as one of the most important events in Armenian history, significantly shaping the people's identity and turning Armenia away from its centuries-long links to the Iranian world. Additionally, the Armenian Church is considered to have provided a structure for the preservation of Armenian identity in the absence of Armenian political independence.

== See also ==
- Christianization of Iberia
- Christianization of the Roman Empire
