= Calendar of saints (Armenian Apostolic Church) =

Calendar of Armenian Apostolic Church

This is a calendar of saints list for the Armenian Apostolic Church.

== Days of observance - 2018 ==
=== January ===
- 1 Third Day of the Fast of the Nativity
- 2 Fourth Day of the Fast of the Nativity
- 3 Fifth Day of the Fast of the Nativity
- 4 Sixth Day of the Fast of the Nativity
- 5 Eve of the Nativity and Theophany of our Lord Jesus Christ
- 6 Feast of the Nativity and Theophany of our Lord Jesus Christ
- 7 Second Day of Nativity, Day of the Remembrance of the Dead
- 8 Third Day of Nativity
- 9 Fourth Day of Nativity
- 10 Fifth Day of Nativity
- 11 Sixth Day of Nativity
- 12 Seventh Day of Nativity
- 13 Eighth Day of Nativity, Feast of the Naming of our Lord Jesus Christ
- 13 First Sunday after Nativity
- 14 Birth of Saint John the Forerunner
- 16 Saints Peter the Patriarch, Blaise the Bishop and Absolom the Deacon
- 17 Fast Day
- 18 The Hermits Saints Anton, Triphon, Barsauma and Onouphrius
- 19 Fast Day
- 20 Saints Theodosius and the Children of Ephesus
- 21 Second Sunday after Nativity
- 22 Saints Kryiakos, Julita, Gordius, Polyeuctus and Saint Grigoris
- 23 Saints Vahan of Goghtn, Eugenia the Virgin, Phillip, Cladia, Sergius and Apito, and the Two Eunuchs
- 24 Fast Day
- 25 Saints Eugenius, Marcarius, Alerius, Canditus and Aquila
- 26 Fast Day
- 27 Holy Fathers Saints Athanasius and Cyril of Alexandria and Gregory the Theologian
- 28 Third Sunday after Nativity
- 29 First Day of the Fast of the Catechumens
- 30 Second Day of the Fast of the Catechumens
- 31 Third Day of the Fast of the Catechumens

=== February ===
- 1 Fourth Day of the Fast of the Catechumens, Remembrance of the Prophet Jonah
- 2 Fifth Day of the Fast of the Catechumens. Remembrance of the Prophet Jonah
- 3 St. Sarkis the Warrior and his son Martiros and his Fourteen Soldiers
- 4 Fourth Sunday after Nativity
- 5 Saints Adom and his soldiers
- 6 The Holy Soukiasian Martyrs
- 7 Fast Day
- 8 The Holy Voskian Priests
- 9 Fast Day
- 10 Catholicos St. Sahak Parthev
- 11 Fifth Sunday after Nativity
- 12 Saints Mark the Bishop, Plonius the Priest, Cyril and Benjamin the Deacons, and Martyrs Abdelmseh, Ormistan and Sayen
- 13 St. Leontius the Priest and his Companions
- 14 Presentation of our Lord Jesus Christ to the Temple
- 15 St. Vartan Mamikonian and his Companions
- 16 Fast Day
- 17 150 Fathers of the Holy Council of Constantinople (AD 381)
- 18 Great Barekendan
- 19 First Day of Great Lent
- 20 Second Day of Great Lent
- 21 Third Day of Great Lent
- 22 Fourth Day of Great Lent
- 23 Fifth Day of Great Lent
- 24 Sixth Day of Great Lent, St. Theodore the Warrior
- 25 Second Sunday of Great Lent, Sunday of the Expulsion
- 26 Eighth Day of Great Lent
- 27 Ninth Day of Great Lent
- 28 Tenth Day of Great Lent

=== March ===
- 1 Eleventh Day of Great Lent
- 2 Twelfth Day of Great Lent
- 3 Thirteenth Day of Great Lent, Saints Cyril of Jerusalem, Cyril the Bishop and Anna
- 4 Third Sunday of Great Lent, Sunday of the Prodigal Son
- 5 Fifteenth Day of Great Lent
- 6 Sixteenth Day of Great Lent
- 7 Seventeenth Day of Great Lent
- 8 Eighteenth Day of Great Lent
- 9 Nineteenth Day of Great Lent
- 10 Twentieth Day of Great Lent, Sts. John of Jerusalem, John of Otzoon, John of Oritri and Gregory of Datev
- 11 Fourth Sunday of Great Lent, Sunday of the Steward
- 12 Twenty Second Day of Great Lent
- 13 Twenty Third Day of Great Lent
- 14 Twenty Fourth Day of Great Lent, Median day of Lent
- 15 Twenty Fifth Day of Great Lent
- 16 Twenty Sixth Day of Great Lent
- 17 Twenty Seventh Day of Great Lent, Forty Holy Martyrs of Sebastia
- 18 Fifth Sunday of Great Lent, Sunday of the Judge
- 19 Twenty Ninth Day of Great Lent
- 20 Thirtieth Day of Great Lent
- 21 Thirty First Day of Great Lent
- 22 Thirty Second Day of Great Lent
- 23 Thirty Third Day of Great Lent
- 24 Thirty Fourth Day of Great Lent, St. Gregory the Illuminator - Commitment to the Pit
- 25 Sixth Sunday of Great Lent, Sunday of the Advent
- 26 Thirty Sixth Day of Great Lent
- 27 Thirty Seventh Day of Great Lent
- 28 Thirty Eighth Day of Great Lent
- 29 Thirty Ninth Day of Great Lent
- 30 Fortieth Day of Great Lent: Feast of the Annunciation of the Holy Virgin Mary
- 31 Forty First Day of Great Lent: Remembrance of the Raising of Lazarus (Lazarus Saturday), Fast

=== April ===
- 1 Holy Week, Palm Sunday
- 2 Great Monday
- 3 Great Tuesday, Remembrance of the Ten Virgins
- 4 Great Wednesday
- 5 Holy Thursday, Remembrance of the Last Supper
- 6 Holy Friday, Commemoration of the Passion, Crucifixion, and Burial of our Lord Jesus Christ
- 7 Holy Saturday: Eve of the Resurrection of our Lord Jesus Christ
- 8 Easter Sunday, Resurrection of our Lord Jesus Christ
- 9 Second Day of Easter, Remembrance of the Dead (Easter)
- 10 Third Day of Easter
- 11 Fourth Day of Easter
- 12 Fifth Day of Easter
- 13 Sixth Day of Easter
- 14 Seventh Day of Easter
- 15 Thomas Sunday (New Sunday)
- 16 Ninth Day of Easter Tide
- 17 Tenth Day of Easter Tide
- 18 Eleventh Day of Easter Tide
- 19 Twelfth Day of Easter Tide
- 20 Thirteenth Day of Easter Tide
- 21 Fourteenth Day of Easter Tide
- 22 Third Sunday, Sunday of the World Church (Green Sunday)
- 23 Sixteenth Day of Easter Tide
- 24 Seventeenth Day of Easter Tide
- 25 Eighteenth Day of Easter Tide
- 26 Nineteenth Day of Easter Tide
- 27 Twentieth Day of Easter Tide
- 28 Twenty First Day of Easter Tide
- 29 Fourth Sunday, Red Sunday
- 30 Twenty Third Day of Easter Tide

=== May ===
- 1 Twenty Fourth Day of Easter Tide
- 2 Twenty Fifth Day of Easter Tide
- 3 Twenty Sixth Day of Easter Tide
- 4 Twenty Seventh Day of Easter Tide
- 5 Twenty Eighth Day of Easter Tide
- 6 Fifth Sunday
- 7 Thirtieth Day of Easter Tide
- 8 Thirty First Day of Easter Tide
- 9 Thirty Second Day of Easter Tide
- 10 Thirty Third Day of Easter Tide
- 11 Thirty Fourth Day of Easter Tide
- 12 Thirty Fifth Day of Easter Tide
- 13 Sixth Sunday of Eastertide
- 14 Thirty Seventh Day of Eastertide
- 15 Thirty Eighth Day of Eastertide
- 16 Thirty Ninth Day of Eastertide
- 17 Fortieth Day of Eastertide, Feast of the Ascension of our Lord Jesus Christ
- 18 Forty First Day of Eastertide
- 19 Forty Second Day of Eastertide
- 20 Second Palm Sunday
- 21 St. Helen and St. Constantine the Great - Equal to the Apostles
- 22 Forty Fifth Day of Eastertide
- 23 Forty Sixth Day of Eastertide
- 24 Forty Seventh Day of Eastertide
- 25 Forty Eighth Day of Eastertide
- 26 Forty Ninth Day of Eastertide
- 27 Pentecost
- 28 Second Day of Pentecost: Fast
- 29 Third Day of Pentecost: Fast
- 30 Fourth Day of Pentecost: Fast
- 31 Fifth Day of Pentecost: Fast

=== June ===
- 1 Sixth Day of Pentecost: Fast
- 2 Seventh Day of Pentecost: Fast
- 3 Remembrance of the Prophet Elijah
- 4 St. Hripsime and her companions
- 5 St. Gayane and her companions
- 6 Fast Day
- 7 Commemoration Day of St. John the Forerunner (the Baptist) and Bishop Atanagine
- 8 Fast Day
- 9 Feast of St. Gregory the Enlightener (Deliverance from the Pit)
- 10 Second Sunday after Pentecost: Feast of the Consecration "Shoghakat" of Holy Etchmiadzin
- 11 Commemoration Day of the Children of Bethlehem, Acacius the Witness, Movkima the Priest and Kotriatos the Soldier
- 12 Holy Virgins Nuneh and Maneh
- 13 Fast Day
- 14 The Holy Princes, Isaac and Joseph and Martyrs Sarkis and Bacchus
- 15 Fast Day
- 16 Commemoration Day of St. Nersess the Great and Bishop Khad
- 17 Third Sunday after Pentecost: Barekendan of the Feast of St. Gregory the Enlightener
- 18 Fast: Saints Epiphanius Bishop of Cyprus, Babylas the Patriarch, and his three disciples
- 19 Fast: Sts. Constantine the Emperor and his mother Helen
- 20 Fast Day
- 21 Fast: Saints Theodotus of Galatia, and Thalelaus the Physician, and the Seven Martyred Virgins of Ancyra
- 22 Fast Day
- 23 Feast of St. Gregory the Enlightener (Discovery of His Relics)
- 24 Fourth Sunday after Pentecost
- 25 Commemoration Day of martyrs St. Antoninus, St. Theophilus, St. Anicetus and St. Potinus
- 26 Feast Day of the Saints Prophet Daniel, and Companions Shadrach, Meshach and Abednego
- 27 Fast Day
- 28 Holy Translators Saints Sahak and Mesrop
- 29 Fast Day
- 30 Saints King Tiridates, Queen Ashkhen and Princess Khosrovidukht

=== July ===
- 1 Fifth Sunday after Pentecost, Feast of the Discovery of St. Mary's Box
- 2 Commemoration Day of St. Kalistratos and his 49 companions, and Lukianos the Priest
- 3 Feast Day of Saint Zechariah the Prophet
- 4 Fast Day
- 5 Feast Day of Saint Elisha the Prophet
- 6 Fast Day
- 7 Feast Day of the Twelve Holy Apostles of Christ and St Paul, the Thirteenth Apostle
- 8 Sixth Sunday after Pentecost, Paregentan of the Fast of Transfiguration
- 9 First Day of the Fast of the Transfiguration
- 10 Second Day of the Fast of the Transfiguration
- 11 Third Day of the Fast of the Transfiguration
- 12 Fourth Day of the Fast of the Transfiguration
- 13 Fifth Day of the Fast of the Transifiguration
- 14 Commemoration of the Old Ark and the Feast of the New Holy Church
- 15 Feast of the Transfiguration of our Lord (Vartavar)
- 16 Second Day of Transfiguration, Remembrance of the Dead (Transfiguration)
- 17 Third Day of Transfiguration
- 18 Fast Day
- 19 Feast Day of Saint Isaiah the Prophet
- 20 Fast Day
- 21 Saints Thaddeus Apostle of Armenia and Sandoukht the Virgin
- 22 Second Sunday after Transfiguration
- 23 Saints Cyprian and the Forty-five Martyrs, and the Virgins Justina, Euphemia, and Christina
- 24 Saints Athenogenes the Bishop and the Ten Disciples and Five Martyrs
- 25 Fast Day
- 26 Commemoration Day of the Holy Forefathers; Adam, Abel, Seth, Enos, Enoch, Noah, Melchizedech, Abraham, Isaac, Jacob, Joseph, Moses, Aaron, Eleazar, Joshua, Samuel, Samson, Jephthah, Barak, Gideon, and other Holy Patriarchs
- 27 Fast Day
- 28 Sons and Grandsons of Saint Gregory the Enlightener: Saints Aristakes, Vertanes, Hoosik, Grogoris and Daniel
- 29 Third Sunday after Transfiguration
- 30 Commemoration Day of the Maccabees, Eleazar the Priest, Shamuna and Her Seven Sons
- 31 Commemoration Day of the 12 Minor Prophets -Hosea, Joel, Amos, Obadiah, Jonah, Micah, Nahum, Habakkuk, Zephaniah, Haggai, Zechariah and Malachi

=== August ===
- 1 Fast Day
- 2 Saints Sophia, Pistis, Elpis and Agape
- 3 Fast Day
- 4 200 Fathers of the Holy Council of Ephesus (AD 431)
- 5 4th Sunday after Transfiguration
- 6 First Day of the Fast of the Holy Mother of God
- 7 Second Day of the Fast of the Holy Mother of God
- 8 Third Day of the Fast of the Holy Mother of God
- 9 Fourth Day of the Fast of the Holy Mother of God
- 10 Fifth Day of the Fast of the Holy Mother of God
- 11 Feast Day of the Apparition of Holy Etchmiadzin
- 12 Feast of the Dormition of the Holy Mother of God (Assumption)
- 13 Second Day of the Dormition, Remembrance of the Dead
- 14 Third Day of the Dormition
- 15 Fourth Day of the Dormition
- 16 Fifth Day of the Dormition
- 17 Sixth Day of the Dormition
- 18 Seventh Day of the Dormition
- 19 Second Sunday after the Dormition
- 20 Ninth Day of Dormition
- 21 Feast Day of Saints Joachim and Anna, parents of the Holy Mother of God and the Oil-bearing women
- 22 Fast Day
- 23 Saint Jeremiah the Prophet
- 24 Fast Day
- 25 Saints Thomas, James and Simon
- 26 Third Sunday after Dormition, Feast Day of the Discovery of the Belt of the Holy Mother of God
- 27 Saints Stephen of Oulnia and the Martyrs Goharinus, Zamidus, Techuicus and Ratigus
- 28 The Holy Prophets Ezekial, Ezra and Zachariah
- 29 Fast Day
- 30 Saints John the Forerunner and Job the Righteous

=== September ===
- 1 318 Fathers of the Holy Council of Nicaea (AD 325)
- 2 Fourth Sunday after Dormition
- 3 Saints Andrew the Soldier and his army; Saints Callinicus and Diometes
- 4 Saints Adrian and Natalia, and the martyrs Saints Theodorus and Eleutherius
- 5 Fast
- 6 Saints Abraham and Khoren, Cosmo and Damian and Theodoron the Martyr
- 7 Fast Day
- 8 Feast of the Nativity of the Holy Mother of God
- 9 Fifth Sunday after the Assumption
- 10 First day of the Fast of the Holy Cross
- 11 Second day of the Fast of the Holy Cross
- 12 Third day of the Fast of the Holy Cross
- 13 Fourth day of the Fast of the Holy Cross
- 14 Fifth day of the Fast of the Holy Cross
- 15 Feast of the Holy Church in view of the Holy Cross
- 16 Feast of the Exaltation of the Holy Cross
- 17 Feast of the Holy Cross, Day of the Remembrance of the dead
- 18 Feast of the Holy Church
- 19 Fast: Feast of the Holy Church
- 20 Feast of the Holy Church
- 21 Feast of the Holy Cross
- 22 Feast of the Holy Cross
- 23 Second Sunday after the Holy Cross:Paregentan of the Holy Cross of Varak
- 24 Fast: Saints Mamas, Philomenos and Simeon the Stylite
- 25 Fast: Holy Virgins Febronia, Marina and Shooshan
- 26 Fast
- 27 Fast: Day of the Holy Father Barlaam, Anthimus and Irenaeus
- 28 Fast
- 29 Saints George the Warrior, Adauctus and Romanos the Melodist
- 30 Third Sunday after the Holy Cross: Feast of the Holy Cross of Varak

=== October ===
- 1 Saints David of Dvin and the Martyrs Lambeos and Lambeas
- 2 Saints Eustathius, Theophistias and their two sons, the Holy Virgins Iermonia and Catherine
- 3 Fast
- 4 The Saintly Princes Sahak and Hamazasb
- 5 Fast
- 6 Seventy Two Holy Disciples of Christ
- 7 Fourth Sunday after the Holy Cross, Fast
- 8 Saints Phocas the Patriarch and Irenaeus of Lyons, follower of the Apostles
- 9 Virgin Saints Thecla, Barbara and Pelagia
- 10 Fast
- 11 Saints Pantaleon the Physician, Hermolaus the Priest and Eupraxia the Virgin
- 12 Fast
- 13 Holy Translators Mesrob, Yeghishe, Moses the Poet, David the Philosopher, Gregory of Narek and Nerses the Graceful
- 14 Fifth Sunday after the Holy Cross
- 15 Discovery of the Relic of Saint Gregory, Catholicos of the Alans, and the Holy Fathers Tatoul, Barrus, Thomas, Anthony, Chronides, and the Seven Vegetarian Hermits
- 16 The Holy Apostles Ananias, Matthias, Barnabas, Philip, John, Silas and Silvanus
- 17 Fast day
- 18 Saints Dionysius the Areopagite and the Apostes Timothy and Titus
- 19 Fast
- 20 Holy Evangelists Matthew, Mark, Luke and John
- 21 Sixth Sunday after the Holy Cross
- 22 Saints Longinus the Centurion, Joseph the Father-of-God, Joseph of Arimathea and Lazarus, Martha and Mary
- 23 Saints Theodoret the Priest of Antioch, Zenon the soldier, Marcarius, Eudoxius and Romulus
- 24 Fast
- 25 Saints Kharityants, the Martyrs Artemius and Christopher, and Niceta and Aquilina
- 26 Fast
- 27 The Twelve Holy Doctors; Hierotheus of Athens, Dionysius the Areopagite, Sylvester of Rome, Athanasius of Alexandria, Cyril of Jerusalem, Ephraem the Syrian, Basil of Caesarea, Gregory of Nyssa, Gregory the Theologian, Epiphanius of Cyprus, John Chrysostom, and Cyril of Alexandria
- 28 Seventh Sunday after the Holy Cross. Discovery of the Holy Cross
- 29 Saints Anastasius the Priest, Varus, Theodota and her sons, and those who were martyred with her
- 30 Saints Huperichians of Samosata
- 31 Fast

=== November ===
- 1 St. John Chrysostom
- 2 Fast
- 3 Feast of All Saints
- 4 Eighth Sunday after the Holy Cross
- 5 Saints Stephen, Patriarch of Rome and the priests deacons and faithful
- 6 Saints Aquiphsimeus the Bishop, Joseph the Priest, Ayethalus the Deacon, and Plato the Martyr
- 7 Fast
- 8 Saints Metrophanes and Alexander, Patriarchs of Constantinople, and Paul the Confessor, and the Scribes Marcian and Martyrius
- 9 Fast
- 10 Holy Archangels Gabriel and Michael and all the heavenly hosts
- 11 Ninth Sunday after the Holy Cross
- 12 Saints Meletius Bishop of Antioch, Menas the Egyptian, and the other Meletius, Bishop of Persia, Buras the Priest and Sennen the Deacon
- 13 Saints Demetrius the Martyr and Basil the Priest
- 14 Fast
- 15 Saints Gurias, Samonas, Abibas the Deacon, Romanus the Monk, Barula the Confessing Youth and Hesychius the Soldier
- 16 Fast
- 17 The Holy Apostles Andrew and Phillip
- 18 Tenth Sunday after the Holy Cross
- 19 First Day of the Fast of Advent
- 20 Second Day of the Fast of Advent: Presentation of the Holy Mother of God to the Temple
- 21 Third Day of the Fast of Advent
- 22 Fourth Day of the Fast of Advent
- 23 Fifth Day of the Fast of Advent
- 24 Saints Gregory the Wonderworker, Nicholas the Bishop and Myron the Bishop
- 25 First Sunday of Advent
- 26 The Holy Virgins Juliana and Basilla
- 27 Saints Lucian the Priest, Tarachus, robus, Andronicus, Onesimus, and other Disciples of Saint Paul
- 28 Fast
- 29 Saints Clement the Bishop and Bagarat the Bishop of Taormina
- 30 Fast

=== December ===
- 1 Holy Apostles Thaddeus and Bartholomew, First Illuminators of Armenia
- 2 Second Sunday of Advent
- 3 Saints Gennaro the Bishop and Mercurius the Warrios, Jacoc and Themistocles
- 4 Saint Abgar the Witness
- 5 Fast
- 6 The Holy Fathers of Egypt Paul, Paul the Simple, Macarius the Elder, Evagrius, John, John the little, Nilus, Arsenius, Sisoes, Daniel, Serapion, Marcarius of Alexandria, Poemen, and other Holy Fathers
- 7 Fast
- 8 Patriarch Saint Nicholas of Smyrna the Wonderworker
- 9 Third Sunday of Advent: Feast of the Conception of the Holy Virgin Mary
- 10 Fast: Saints Mennas, Hermongenes, Eugraphius and John and Alexis
- 11 Fast: Saints Cornelius the Centurion, Simeon the Relative of Christ, Polycarp the Bishop of Smyrna and the Martyrs that perished in the East
- 12 Fast
- 13 Fast: Saints Eustratius, Auxentius, Eugenius, Orestes and Martyrius
- 14 Fast
- 15 Saints James of Nisibis, Marouke the Monk and Melitus the Bishop
- 16 Fourth Sunday of Advent
- 17 The Holy Fathers Ignatius Bishop of Antioch, and Addais, Maruthas the Bishop
- 18 Saints Theopompas the Bishop, Theonas the Martyr and the Four Soldiers, Basus, Eusebe, Eutyche and Basilides
- 19 Fast Day
- 20 The Holy Virgins Indus and Domna, Clericus the Elder and the 20,000 Martyrs of the church of Nicomedia
- 21 Fast
- 22 Saints Basil the Patriarch, Gregory of Nyssa, Silvester the Patriarch of Rome, and Ephraim of Syria
- 23 Fifth Sunday of Advent
- 24 Saints David the Prophet-King and the Holy Apostle James
- 25 St. Stephen the Protodeacon and First Martyr
- 26 Fast
- 27 Holy Apostles Peter and Paul
- 28 Fast
- 29 Holy Apostles, James and John, "Sons of Thunder": Paregentan of the Fast of Nativity
- 30 Sixth Sunday of Advent
- 31 First Day of the Fast of Nativity

== See also ==
- Armenian calendar
