= Artavasdes V =

In the late Roman collection of biographies Historia Augusta (Vita Valeriani 3), a "king of the Armenians" named Artavasdes (also spelled Artabasdes) is mentioned as writing a letter to the Sasanian monarch Shapur I (r. 240–270) pleading for the captive Roman emperor Valerian. According to Marie-Louise Chaumont, this Artavasdes is "evidently a legendary figure". Cyril Toumanoff writes that the letter is fabricated and that "Artavasdes" is a "Classical […] disguise" for Hormizd-Ardashir, the son of Shapur who had been placed on the Armenian throne after a Sasanian invasion in 252. Toumanoff writes, "The ancient Armenian royal name of Artavasdes had for a Roman, as yet unused to the Sassanian style, a decidedly more familiar—more authentic—ring than the militantly neo-Achaemenian, and therefore essentially anti-Hellenistic, Ohrmizd-Artaxšatr [i.e. Hormizd-Ardashir]".

However, other authors have accepted the existence of an Artavasdes V of Armenia, and various origins have been ascribed to him. Hakob Manandyan writes that none of the hypotheses about his origins can be proved and that it can only be considered likely that he was a non-Arsacid who was friendly to the Sasanians. According to Manandyan, Artavasdes was placed on the Armenian throne in 252/3 after the Sasanian invasion and the flight of King Tiridates II of Armenia to Roman territory. He suggests that Artavasdes reigned until after the death of Shapur I, when, in his view, the Arsacid heir Khosrov II likely took the Armenian throne. According to Suren Yeremian's version, Artavasdes was in fact a scion of the Arsacid dynasty. He considers possible the existence of Artavasdes' letter to Shapur recorded in the Historia Augusta and takes it as evidence that Artavasdes was sympathetic to the Romans and submitted to the Sasanians unwillingly. Per Yeremian, Artavasdes' letter must have been taken as a sign of disloyalty to the Sasanians, and he was deposed and apparently killed in about 261, after which Armenia was ruled by Sasanian princes for 32 years.

== Sources ==
- Chaumont, Marie-Louise (1986). "Armenia and Iran ii. The pre-Islamic period". In Yarshater, Ehsan (ed.). Encyclopædia Iranica. Vol. II/4: Architecture IV–Armenia and Iran IV (Online ed.). Encyclopædia Iranica Foundation. pp. 418–438.
- Manandyan, Hakob (1978). Erker Երկեր [Works]. Vol. 2. Erevan: Haykakan SSH GA hratarakchʻutʻyun.
- Toumanoff, Cyril (1969). "The Third-Century Armenian Arsacids: A Chronological and Genealogical Commentary". Revue des études arméniennes. 6: 233–281.
- Yeremian, Suren; et al., eds. (1984). Hay zhoghovrdi patmutʻyun Հայ ժողովրդի պատմություն [History of the Armenian People] (in Armenian). Vol. 2. Yerevan: HSSH GA hratarakchʻutʻyun.
