= Khosrovidukht (princess) =

3rd-century Armenian princess

Saint Khosrovidukht Խոսրովիդուխտ
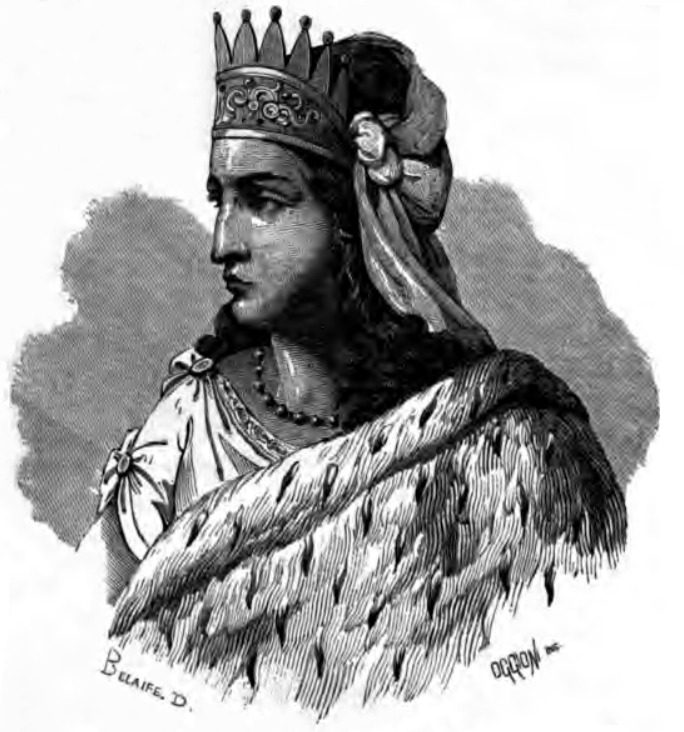
- An idealized image of Khosrovidukht from the early 20th century.
- Venerated in: Armenian Apostolic Church
- Feast: Saturday before fifth Sunday after Pentecost (Armenian Apostolic Church)

Khosrovidukht also transliterated Xosroviduxt (flourished second half of 3rd century & first half of 4th century) was a princess of the Arsacid dynasty of Armenia, one of the client-kingdoms of the Roman Empire and a branch of the Arsacid dynasty of Parthia.

Khosrovidukht was the daughter of King Khosrov II of Armenia by a mother whose name is unknown. Her only known sibling was her brother Tiridates III of Armenia who ruled Armenia from 287 to 330. The name Khosrovidukht was a dynastic name in the Arsacid royal house as she was the namesake of her father and her paternal great-grandfather Khosrov I, a previous ruling Armenian King.

== Name ==
The name "Khosrovidukht" (Xosrovi-dowxt) is Parthian, meaning "daughter of Khosrov".

== Biography ==
In 252, her father and the rest of her family were assassinated by Anak, a Parthian agent on the orders of Ardashir I. After the capture and execution of Anak, the Roman authorities took her infant brother to be raised in Rome while Khosrovidukht was raised in Caesarea Mazaca, Cappadocia. Her foster parents were Awtay, a nobleman from the Amatuni family, and his wife from the Slkunik family.

Khosrovidukht returned after Tiridates was restored to the Armenian throne by Diocletian in 287. The Armenian state religion at the time was Zoroastrianism. Armenian Christian legend says that after Tiridates killed a group of Christians, the Hripsimeyan nuns, and sent another Christian, Gregory the Illuminator to the Khor Virap dungeon, he became mentally ill. Khosrovidukht was told in a dream to free Gregory. When Khosrovidukht told her brother Tiridates about the dream, he ordered Gregory to be released. Khosrovidukht and her sister-in-law Ashkhen may have already accepted Christianity through the Hripsimeyan nuns and others in the Armenian Christian underground. Cured of his illness in 301, Tiridates then proclaimed Christianity as Armenia's official state religion, making Armenia the first country in the world to do so. Gregory was then appointed Catholicos of the Armenian Apostolic Church and baptized Tiridates's family, court and army on the Euphrates river.

Tiridates, Khosrovidukht and Ashkhen participated in the construction of the Etchmiadzin Cathedral, Saint Gayane Church, Saint Hripsime Church and the Shoghakat Church. During the construction of Saint Gayane and Saint Hripsime Churches, Ashkhen and Khosrovidukht donated their jewels for the expenses for the church.

Towards the end of her life, Khosrovidukht and Ashkhen retired to the castle of Garni. Khosrovidukht may have died around 330. She, Tiridates and Ashkhen are saints in the Armenian Apostolic Church and their feast day is on Saturday after the fifth Sunday after Pentecost.

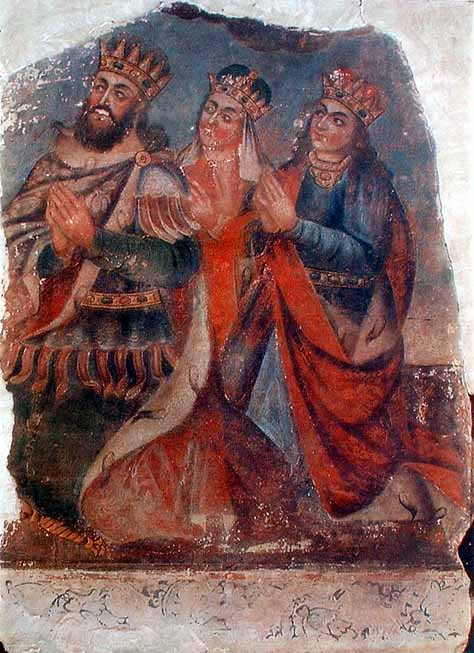
Tiridates, Ashkhen and Khosrovidukht in a painting from 1701

== Sources ==
- Armenian Names – Female:Khosrovidkht
- Moslem architecture: its origins and development, by G.T. Riviora, translated from the Italian by G.M.C.N. Rushforth Humphrey Milford, Oxford University Press, 1918
- R.W. Thomson, Agathangelos's History of the Armenians, SUNY Press, 1976
- B. Eghiayean, Heroes of Hayastan: a dramatic novel history of Armenia, Armenian National Fund, 1993
- M.H. Dodgeon & S.N.C Lieu, The Roman Eastern Frontier and the Persian Wars AD 226–363, A documentary History Compiled and edited, Routledge, 1994
- Schmitt, Rüdiger (2005). "Personal Names, Iranian iv. Parthian Period". Encyclopædia Iranica, online edition. New York.
