= Tiridates II of Armenia =

King of Armenia from 217 to 252

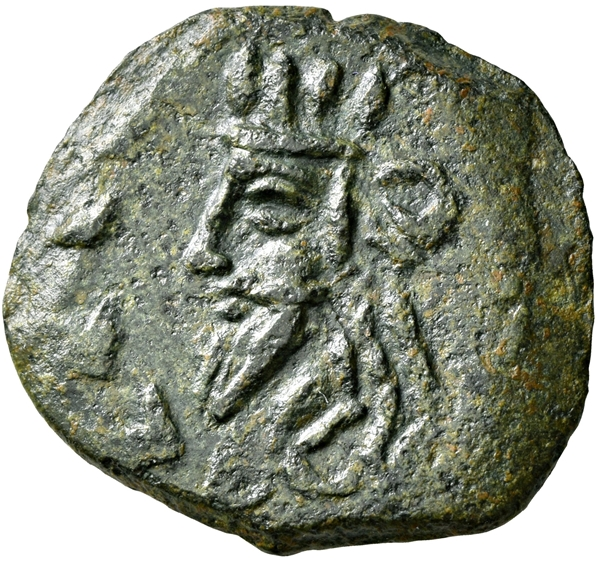
- Obverse of a coin attributed to Tiridates II of Armenia

King of Armenia
- Reign: 217–252
- Predecessor: Khosrov I
- Successor: Hormizd-Ardashir (Sasanian dynasty)
- Issue: Khosrov II or Tiridates III
- Dynasty: Arsacid dynasty
- Father: Khosrov I
- Religion: Zoroastrianism

Tiridates II (fl. 3rd century) was an Arsacid prince who was King of Armenia from 217 to 252. In the old Armenian sources, the events of his reign are associated with a "Khosrov the Brave".

In 214, Tiridates' father, King Khosrov I, was arrested by the Roman emperor Caracalla, provoking a rebellion in Armenia. Caracalla's successor Macrinus recognized Tiridates as King of Armenia in 217. Tiridates subsequently spent most of his reign fighting against the Sasanians, who overthrew his Arsacid kinsmen and took over Iran c. 224. While Armenia was able to resist the Sasanians during the reign of Ardashir I, the next Sasanian king Shapur I won several victories over the Romans and succeeded in subjugating Armenia. Tiridates fled Shapur's invasion of Armenia in 252. According to one historian, he continued to rule over a smaller, Roman-controlled portion of Armenia until his assassination on Shapur's orders in 256.

After Tiridates' flight, Shapur made his own son Hormizd-Ardashir the king of Armenia, and Armenia was ruled by Sasanian princes until the 290s. According to historians Hakob Manandyan and Cyril Toumanoff, Tiridates had a son named Khosrov II who later became King of Armenia (per Toumanoff, only of the western, Roman-controlled sector). According to historian Suren Yeremian's version, there was no Khosrov II, and Tiridates II was the father of Tiridates III, who eventually became King of Armenia and converted the kingdom to Christianity.

== Chronological problems ==
There is no conclusive chronology of the reigns of Armenian kings of the third century. In the old Armenian sources, only two kings are mentioned in connection with the events of the third century: Khosrov the Brave (K’aj, also Mets 'the Great'), who fought with the first Sasanians and was assassinated, and his son Tiridates (Trdat) the Great, who converted Armenia to Christianity in the early fourth century. Historians Hakob Manandyan and Cyril Toumanoff have attempted reconstruct the chronology of the third century in Armenia, identifying several kings who, they assert, were subsequently combined into the figures of Khosrov and Tiridates.

== Accession ==
As the Greco-Roman historian Cassius Dio records, in 214 the Arsacid king of Armenia (left unnamed but thought to be Khosrov I) was arrested by the Roman emperor Caracalla (r. 198–217), who had lured him to Rome under the pretense of resolving a conflict between the king and his sons. The king's arrest provoked a rebellion in Armenia, and a Roman force sent to suppress the rebellion was defeated. In 217, in a peace treaty between Rome and Parthia, the succeeding Roman emperor Macrinus (r. 217–218) recognized the kingship of Tiridates II, son of the Armenian king arrested in Rome.

== Reign ==
Marie-Louise Chaumont writes that "no further information about [Tiridates II] has come down" and moves on to the reign of Khosrov the Great. However, other scholars identify Tiridates II with subsequent events, which in the old Armenian sources are placed in the reign of Khosrov the Great. In about 224, the last Arsacid ruler of Iran, Artabanus IV, was overthrown by the Sasanian dynast Ardashir I. The Arsacid king of Armenia was hostile to the new Sasanian dynasty, which had overthrown his kinsmen in Iran. Armenia consequently drew closer to Rome and came into conflict with the Sasanians. According to Manandyan and others, it was during Tiridates' reign that Artabanus' sons and those Parthian nobles opposed to the new Sasanian dynasty came to Armenia. Among these nobles were the Mamikonian and Kamsarakan families, which subsequently rose to prominence in Armenia. The Armenians, allied with the Atropatenians (who were led by sons of Artabanus), repulsed Ardashir's attempt to conquer Armenia. In 232, Tiridates participated in the Roman response to Ardashir's attacks in Syria and Cappadocia. A Roman force traveled through Armenia to invade Media. Despite some successes, the Romans were forced by other setbacks to retreat and many died in the Armenian winter. Toumanoff writes that Tiridates II has been correctly remembered in the Armenian historical tradition, under the guise of "Khosrov the Great", as a king who fought against Iran for his entire reign.

Ardashir's son and successor Shapur I won several victories over the Romans. In 244, after the Sasanian victory at the Battle of Misiche, the Romans renounced their protectorate over Armenia. Historians consider this the beginning of Sasanian domination over Armenia. Apparently reacting to Roman attempts to regain their position in Armenia, Shapur invaded Armenia in 252; according to Toumanoff, this caused the flight of Tiridates II to Roman territory. Tiridates II's sons went over to Shapur's side, while Shapur made his own son Hormizd-Ardashir King of Armenia. Manandyan also places Tiridates II's flight in 252 but states that his successor was Artavasdes, a non-Arsacid placed on the Armenian throne by the Sasanians. According to Suren Yeremian, Tiridates II fled the Sasanian takeover of Armenia in 253 and ruled over a smaller, Roman-controlled part of Armenia until his assassination on Shapur I's orders in 256. The Sasanians then invaded the Roman sector of Armenia, causing the flight of the young prince Tiridates, son of the murdered Tiridates II. Yeremian's proposal that Armenia was partitioned in this period (de jure in 244 and de facto in 253) was criticized as baseless by Artashes Martirosyan.

== Heir ==
Manandyan and Toumanoff assume the existence of a son of Tiridates named Khosrov II. Manandyan suggests that Khosrov II took the Armenian throne after Shapur I's death in 270, while Toumanoff supposes that, as a result of negotiations between the Sasanian king of Armenia Narseh and the Roman emperor Probus in 279/80, Khosrov was made king of a western, Roman-controlled portion of Armenia. Yeremian's version does not include a king named Khosrov II and makes Tiridates III the son of Tiridates II and his ultimate successor after the end of Sasanian domination in Armenia.

== Coinage ==
A number of coins have cautiously been attributed to Tiridates II, which would make him the first Armenian king to strike coins since Tigranes VI in 66/67 and the only Armenian king of the Arsacid dynasty to do so. The larger coins display his head surrounded by a wreath, which is "likely emblematic of his success in thwarting the Sasanian attacks on his kingdom."

== Sources ==
- Bonner, Michael R. Jackson (2020). The Last Empire of Iran. New York: Gorgias Press. ISBN 978-1463206161.
- Chaumont, Marie-Louise (1986). "Armenia and Iran ii. The pre-Islamic period". In Yarshater, Ehsan (ed.). Encyclopædia Iranica. Vol. II/4: Architecture IV–Armenia and Iran IV (Online ed.). Encyclopædia Iranica Foundation. pp. 418–438.
- Curtis, Vesta Sarkhosh (2016). "Ancient Iranian Motifs and Zoroastrian Iconography". In Williams, Markus; Stewart, Sarah; Hintze, Almut (eds.). The Zoroastrian Flame Exploring Religion, History and Tradition. I.B. Tauris. pp. 179–203. ISBN 9780857728159.
- de Jong, Albert (2015). "Armenian and Georgian Zoroastrianism". In Stausberg, Michael; Vevaina, Yuhan Sohrab-Dinshaw; Tessmann, Anna (eds.). The Wiley Blackwell Companion to Zoroastrianism. John Wiley & Sons.
- Frye, Richard N. (2005). "The Sassanians". The Cambridge Ancient History, Volume 12: The Crisis of Empire, AD 193–337. Cambridge University Press. pp. 461–480. ISBN 0-521-30199-8.
- Garsoïan, Nina (1997). "The Aršakuni Dynasty". In Hovannisian, Richard G. (ed.). The Armenian People from Ancient to Modern Times. Vol. 1. New York: St. Martin's Press. ISBN 0-312-10169-4.
- Kovacs, Frank L. (2016). Armenian Coinage in the Classical Period. Classical Numismatic Studies 10. Lancaster, PA: Classical Numismatic Group. ISBN 978-0-9837652-4-0.
- Manandyan, Hakob (1978). Erker Երկեր [Works]. Vol. 2. Erevan: Haykakan SSH GA hratarakchʻutʻyun.
- Martirosyan, A. A. (1987). "III darum Mets Haykʻi bazhanman varkatsě" III դարում Մեծ Հայքի բաժանման վարկածը [The hypothesis of the division of Greater Armenia in the third century]. Patma-Banasirakan Handes (in Armenian) (3): 201–212.
- Redgate, A. E. (1998). The Armenians. Peoples of Europe. Oxford: Blackwell. ISBN 0-631-14372-6.
- Russell, James R. (1987). Zoroastrianism in Armenia. Harvard University Press. ISBN 978-0674968509.
- Toumanoff, Cyril (1969). "The Third-Century Armenian Arsacids: A Chronological and Genealogical Commentary". Revue des études arméniennes. 6: 233–281.
- Wiesehöfer, Josef; Schottky, Martin (2006). "Tiridates". Brill's New Pauly Online. [6] T. II. doi:10.1163/1574-9347_bnp_e1215570.
- Yeremian, Suren; et al., eds. (1984). Hay zhoghovrdi patmutʻyun Հայ ժողովրդի պատմություն [History of the Armenian People] (in Armenian). Vol. 2. Yerevan: HSSH GA hratarakchʻutʻyun.
