= Ashkhen =

Armenian queen of Alanian origin

Queen Ashkhen
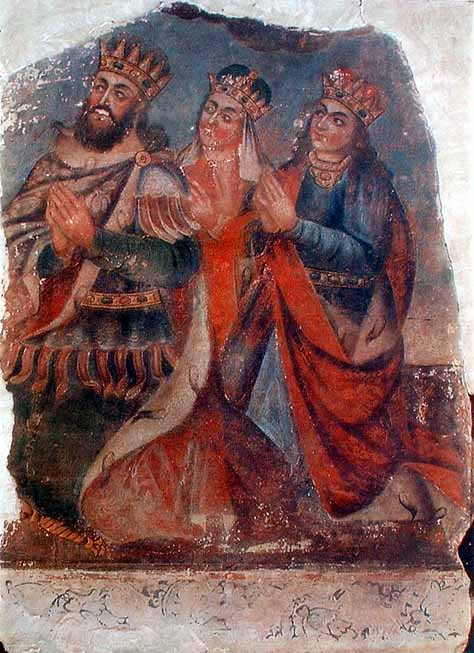
- Tiridates III with his wife Ashkhen and sister Khosrovidukht by Naghash Hovnatan.

Armenian Queen Consort
- Reign: 4th century
- Predecessor: N/A
- Successor: N/A
- Born: Late 3rd century Alania
- Died: Early 4th century Garni castle
- Husband: Tiridates III of Armenia
- Issue: Khosrov III the Small Mahbanu Arshakuni
- House: Arsacid dynasty of Armenia
- Father: Axidares of Alania

Saint Ashkhen
- Venerated in: Armenian Apostolic Church
- Feast: Saturday before fifth Sunday after Pentecost (Armenian Apostolic Church)

Ashkhen (Armenian: Աշխէն, flourished second half of the 3rd century & first half of the 4th century) was the Queen of Armenia and a member of the Arsacid dynasty by marriage to King Tiridates III of Armenia.

== Family and origins ==
Ashkhen was a monarch of Sarmatian origins. She was the daughter and is the known child of the King of the Alans, Ashkatar who is also known as Ashkhadar by an unnamed wife. Ashkhen was born at an unknown date between about 260-280 and was raised in the Alani Kingdom. Little is known on her early life, prior to marrying Tiridates III.

The name Ashkhen is a female Armenian name which derives from the word akhsen, ‘grey’, or Zend akhsaena which means ‘black’ or ‘bluish-black’.

== Biography ==
Tiridates III served as a Roman client king of Armenia from 287 to 330, and married Ashkhen in 297. At the time the Armenian state religion was Zoroastrianism. Tiridates III and Ashkhen had three children: a son, Khosrov III, a daughter, Salome, and an unnamed daughter who married St. Husik I, an early Catholicos (head of the Armenian Apostolic Church).

According to legend, after Tiridates had killed a group of Christians, the Hripsimeyan nuns, he lost his sanity. Meanwhile Ashkhen and Tiridates' sister Khosrovidukht may have already been converted to Christianity through the efforts of the Hripsimeyan nuns and others in the Armenian Christian underground. The legend says that after Khosrovidukht persuaded Tiridates to free the Christian Gregory the Illuminator (later considered the Armenian patron saint), whom he had imprisoned, Gregory cured him of his madness. Then, Tiridates converted and declared Christianity the official state religion of Armenia, making it the first nation to officially adopt Christianity. Sometime after Tiridates III's baptism, Gregory baptised Tiridates III's family, including Ashkhen and his entire court and his army on the Euphrates River.

To help pay for the construction of Saint Gayane Church and Saint Hripsime Church, Ashkhen and Khosrovidukht donated their jewels.

Towards the end of her life, Ashkhen retired to the castle of Garni with Khosrovidukht. Ashkhen and Khosrovidukht are regarded as prominent figures in Armenian society and are significant figures in Christianity in Armenia. Ashkhen, Tiridates III, and Khosrovidukht are Saints in the Armenian Apostolic Church and their feast day is on the Saturday after the fifth Sunday after Pentecost. On this feast day To the Kings is sung. Their feast day is usually around June 30.

== See also ==
- Armenian Apostolic Church
- Arsacid dynasty of Armenia
- Saint Gregory the Illuminator Cathedral, Yerevan

== Sources ==
- Armenian female names – Ashkhen
- Ashkhen's genealogy at Rootsweb
- Ashkhadar's genealogy at Rootsweb
- Father M. Chamich, History of Armenia from BC 2247 to the year of Christ 1780 or 1229 of the Armenian Era. Translated from the original Armenian, Johannes Avdall, Esq, Bishop's College Press, 1827
- R.W. Thomson, Agathangelo's History of the Armenians, SUNY Press, 1976
- B. Eghiayean, Heroes of Hayastan: a dramatic novel history of Armenia, Armenian National Fund, 1993
- M.H. Dodgeon & S.N.C Lieu, The Roman Eastern Frontier and the Persian Wars AD 226–363, A documentary History Compiled and edited, Routledge, 1994
- M. Vahan Kurkjian, A History of Armenia, Indo-European Publishing, 2008
