= Khosrov II =

Armenian king from 252 to 258

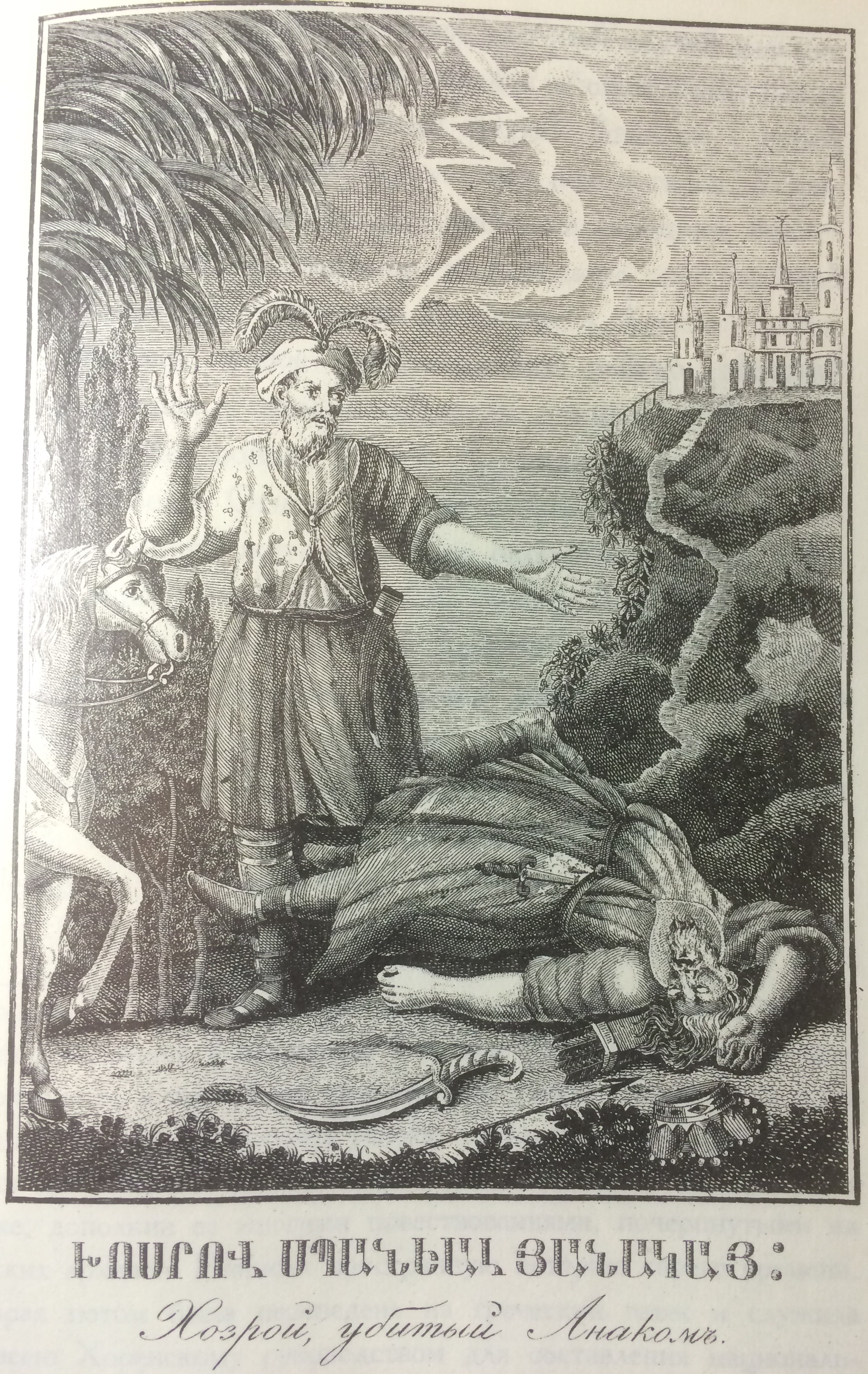
- King Khosrov II of Armenia, killed by Anak.

King of Armenia
- Reign: 272/73 or 279/80–287
- Predecessor: Hormizd-Ardashir
- Successor: Tiridates III
- Died: 287
- Issue: Tiridates III; Khosrovidukht
- Dynasty: Arsacid dynasty
- Father: Tiridates II
- Religion: Zoroastrianism

According to some reconstructions of third-century Armenian history, Khosrov II was an Armenian king from the Arsacid dynasty in the second half of the third century. Nothing concrete is known about his reign, which has been reconstructed by historians using limited evidence.

According to these reconstructions, Khosrov was the son of King Tiridates II, who fled to the Roman Empire after a Sasanian invasion of his kingdom in 252. Hormizd-Ardashir, son of the Sasanian king Shapur I, became King of Armenia, while Tiridates' sons are said to have gone over to the Sasanian side. According to Cyril Toumanoff's reconstruction, Khosrov became king of a western, Roman-controlled portion of Armenia in 279/80, while the rest of Armenia remained under Sasanian domination. According to Hakob Manandyan's version, Khosrov became King of Armenia in 272/73, after the death of Shapur I in 270. He is thought to have been assassinated in 287. Toumanoff believed he was killed and replaced by a brother named Tiridates. Khosrov's young son Tiridates was taken to the Roman Empire and was later placed on the Armenian throne by the Romans after the Peace of Nisibis in 298.

Other scholars maintain a different chronology with no place for Khosrov II, asserting that the reign of Tiridates II (usually identified as the "Khosrov the Great" of Armenian sources) was followed by Sasanian occupation of the country, which ended in the 290s with the return of Tiridates' son Tiridates III to the Armenian throne.

== Biography ==
There is no conclusive chronology of the reigns of Armenian kings of the third century. In the old Armenian sources, only two kings are mentioned in connection with the events of the third century: Khosrov the Brave (K’aj, also Mets 'the Great') and his son Tiridates (Trdat) the Great. Historians Hakob Manandyan and Cyril Toumanoff have attempted reconstruct the chronology of the third century in Armenia, identifying several kings who, they assert, were subsequently combined into the figures of Khosrov and Tiridates.

According to Toumanoff, King Tiridates II of Armenia (r. 216/7–252) fled to the Roman Empire after the Sasanian king Shapur I invaded his kingdom. Tiridates II's sons went over to Shapur's side, while Shapur made his own son Hormizd-Ardashir King of Armenia. Hormizd-Ardashir succeed to the Sasanian throne after his father's death in 270 (but reigned for only a year). Upon ascending the throne, Hormizd-Ardashir appears to have left Armenia to his brother Narseh. Toumanoff supposes that, as a result of negotiations between Narseh and the Roman emperor Probus in 279/80, Khosrov, son of Tiridates II, was made king of a western, Roman-controlled portion of Armenia while Narseh retained the eastern part of the country. This Khosrov was conflated in the Armenian sources with Khosrov I, predecessor of Tiridates II. Khosrov reigned until 287, (Note: This date is based on the list of kings placed together with the history of Sebeos, which places Khosrov the Brave's death in the fourth year of the reign of Diocletian (i.e. 287).) when he was killed by his brother, whom Toumanoff calles Tiridates III. (Note: Toumanoff argues that the story of Khosrov's murder by Anak the Parthian recorded by Agathangelos is fictional and instead favors the version in Elishe where Khosrov is murdered by his brothers. He suggests that the story of Khosrov's murder by an Iranian agent may have been invented later to mask "the horror of this fratricide.") Finally, Khosrov's son Tiridates (Tiridates IV by Toumanoff's count) was made king of Armenia after the Roman victory over the Sasanians and the signing of the Peace of Nisibis in 298.

Manandyan's reconstruction corresponds to Toumanoff's regarding the flight of Tiridates II in 252, but he does not suppose that Khosrov II reigned in a western, Roman-controlled part of Armenia. (Note: Following the mention of an otherwise unattested "Artavasdes rex armeniorum " in the Historia Augusta, Manandyan writes that Shapur I placed a non-Arsacid named Artavasdes on the Armenian throne after taking over the country. But, according to Toumanoff, this Artavasdes is simply a "disguise" for Hormizd-Ardashir.) He assumes that Khosrov II, son of Tiridates II, took the Armenian throne in 272/73, after Shapur I's death in 270. Khosrov then recognized Roman hegemony during Emperor Carus' (r. 282–283) eastern campaign. Subsequently, from the accession of Diocletian in 284 to the end of the third century, the situation in the Near East was uncertain, with neither Rome nor Persia having a clear advantage. Manandyan considers it likely that Khosrov pursued a pro-Roman policy, incurring the wrath of the Sasanian king and leading to his assassination—memory of which was preserved in the history of Agathangelos as the murder of Khosrov the Brave by Anak the Parthian and in the history of Elishe as the murder of Khosrov by his own brothers. Manandyan views Elishe's version as closer to reality and considers it possible that Khosrov's murder occurred in 287. Manandyan assumes that Khosrov's brothers took power after killing him, while Khosrov's young son Tiridates was taken to the Roman Empire. Later, after the Roman victory over the Sasanians and the conclusion of the Peace of Nisibis in 298, Tiridates was placed on the Armenian throne as a Roman vassal. Other scholars, citing the mention of "Tirdat the King" in the Paikuli inscription of Narseh, believe that Tiridates had already been placed on the Armenian throne in 287.

Other reconstructions of third-century Armenian history omit Khosrov II. According to Suren Yeremian, Tiridates II (the "Khosrov the Great" of the old Armenian sources) fled the Sasanian takeover of Armenia in 253 and ruled over a smaller, Roman part of Armenia until his assassination on Shapuh I's orders in 256. The Sasanians then invaded the Roman sector of Armenia, causing the flight of the young prince Tiridates, son of the murdered Tiridates II. In about 261, the Sasanians deposed Artavasdes (considered a scion of the Arsacid dynasty by Yeremian), whom they had earlier made King of Armenia. Armenia was then ruled as a royal domain of the Sasanian dynasty for 32 years (261–293). In 287, Tiridates became the Roman vassal king of the ruler of the Roman part of Armenia, with the recognition of Narseh, the Sasanian king of Armenia and pretender to the Sasanian throne. Upon becoming Shahanshah of the Sasanian Empire in 293, Narseh recognized Tiridates' rule over the Persian sector of Armenia as well, in order to secure his western border and gain recognition from Rome and Armenia. (Note: See also Marie-Louise Chaumont's version, which makes Khosrov the Great King of Armenia until his murder a few years after 244, followed by Shapur I's takeover over Armenia c. 252/253, followed by the restoration of Tiridates, son of Khosrov, over the Roman part of Armenia around 286–287 and finally over all of Armenia after Galerius' defeat of Narseh around 297.)

== Bibliography ==
- Chaumont, Marie Louise (1986). "Armenia and Iran ii. The pre-Islamic period". In Yarshater, Ehsan (ed.). Encyclopædia Iranica. Vol. II/4: Architecture IV–Armenia and Iran IV (Online ed.). Encyclopædia Iranica Foundation. pp. 418–438.
- Garsoïan, Nina (1997). "The Aršakuni Dynasty". In Hovannisian, Richard G. (ed.). The Armenian People from Ancient to Modern Times. Vol. 1. New York: St. Martin's Press. ISBN 0-312-10169-4.
- Manandyan, Hakob (1978). Erker Երկեր [Works]. Vol. 2. Erevan: Haykakan SSH GA hratarakchʻutʻyun.
- Toumanoff, Cyril (1969). "The Third-Century Armenian Arsacids: A Chronological and Genealogical Commentary". Revue des études arméniennes. 6: 233–281.
- Yeremian, Suren; et al., eds. (1984). Hay zhoghovrdi patmutʻyun Հայ ժողովրդի պատմություն [History of the Armenian People] (in Armenian). Vol. 2. Yerevan: HSSH GA hratarakchʻutʻyun.
