= Tiridates III of Armenia =

King of Armenia c. 298–330 AD, Christian saint

Tiridates III the Great
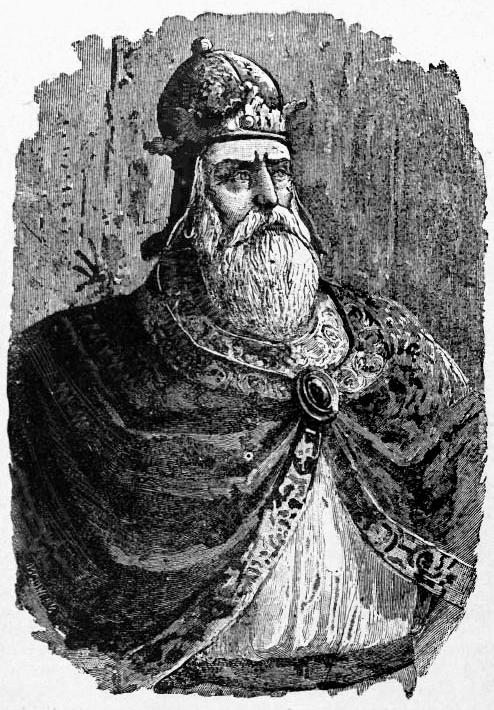
- 19th-century illustration of Tiridates

King of Armenia
- Reign: 298–c. 330 AD
- Predecessor: Khosrov II
- Successor: Khosrov III the Small
- Born: 250s AD
- Died: c. 330 AD
- Burial: Kemah
- Consort: Ashkhen
- Issue: Khosrov III the Small; Salome of Armenia
- Dynasty: Arsacid dynasty
- Father: Khosrov II of Armenia
- Religion: Zoroastrianism (before 301); Armenian Christianity (after 301)

Tiridates III (c. 250s – c. 330), also known as Tiridates the Great or Tiridates IV, was the Armenian Arsacid king from c. 298 to c. 330. In the early 4th century (301, according to tradition) Tiridates adopted Christianity as the state religion of Armenia, thus making the Kingdom of Armenia the first state to officially embrace Christianity.

== Name ==
The name Tiridates is the Greek variant of the Parthian name Trdat, meaning "created by Tir." Although Tir does not appear in the Avesta, he is a prominent yazata (angelic divinity) in the Zoroastrian religion. The name also appears in other Greek variants, such as Terdates, Teridates, Teridatios, and Tiridatios. It appears in Syriac as Turadatis and in Latin as Tiridates.

== Early childhood ==
Tiridates III was the son of Khosrov II of Armenia, the latter being assassinated in 252 by a Parthian agent named Anak under orders from Ardashir I. Tiridates had at least one sibling, a sister called Khosrovidukht and was the namesake of his paternal grandfather, Tiridates II of Armenia. Anak was captured and executed along with most of his family, while his son, Gregory the Illuminator, was sheltered in Caesaria, in Cappadocia. As the only surviving heir to the throne, Tiridates was quickly taken away to Rome soon after his father's assassination while still an infant. He was educated in Rome and was skilled in languages and military tactics; in addition he firmly understood and appreciated Roman law. The Armenian historian Movses Khorenatsi describes him as a strong and brave warrior, who participated in combat against his enemies, and personally led his army to victory in many battles.

== Kingship ==
In 270, the Roman emperor Aurelian engaged the Sassanids on the eastern front and was able to drive them back. Tiridates, as heir to the now Persian-occupied Armenian throne, came to Armenia and quickly raised an army and drove the enemy out in 298.

For a while, fortune appeared to favour Tiridates. He not only expelled his enemies, but he carried his arms into Assyria. At the time the Persian Empire was in a distracted state. The throne was disputed by the ambition of two contending brothers, Hormuz and Narses. The civil war was, however, soon terminated and Narses was universally acknowledged as King of Persia. Narses then directed his whole force against the foreign enemy. The contest then became too unequal. Tiridates once more took refuge with the Romans. The Roman-Armenian alliance grew stronger, especially while Diocletian ruled the empire. This can be attributed to the upbringing of Tiridates, the consistent Persian aggressions and the murder of his father by Anak. With Diocletian's help, Tiridates pushed the Persians out of Armenia. In 299, Diocletian left the Armenian state in a quasi-independent and protectorate status possibly to use it as a buffer in case of a Persian attack.

In 297, Tiridates married an Alanian princess called Ashkhen, by whom he had three children: a son called Khosrov III, a daughter called Salome, and another daughter who married St. Husik I, one of the earlier Catholicoi of the Armenian Apostolic Church.

== Conversion ==
Saint Tiridates III the Great Սբ. Տրդատ Մեծ թագավոր
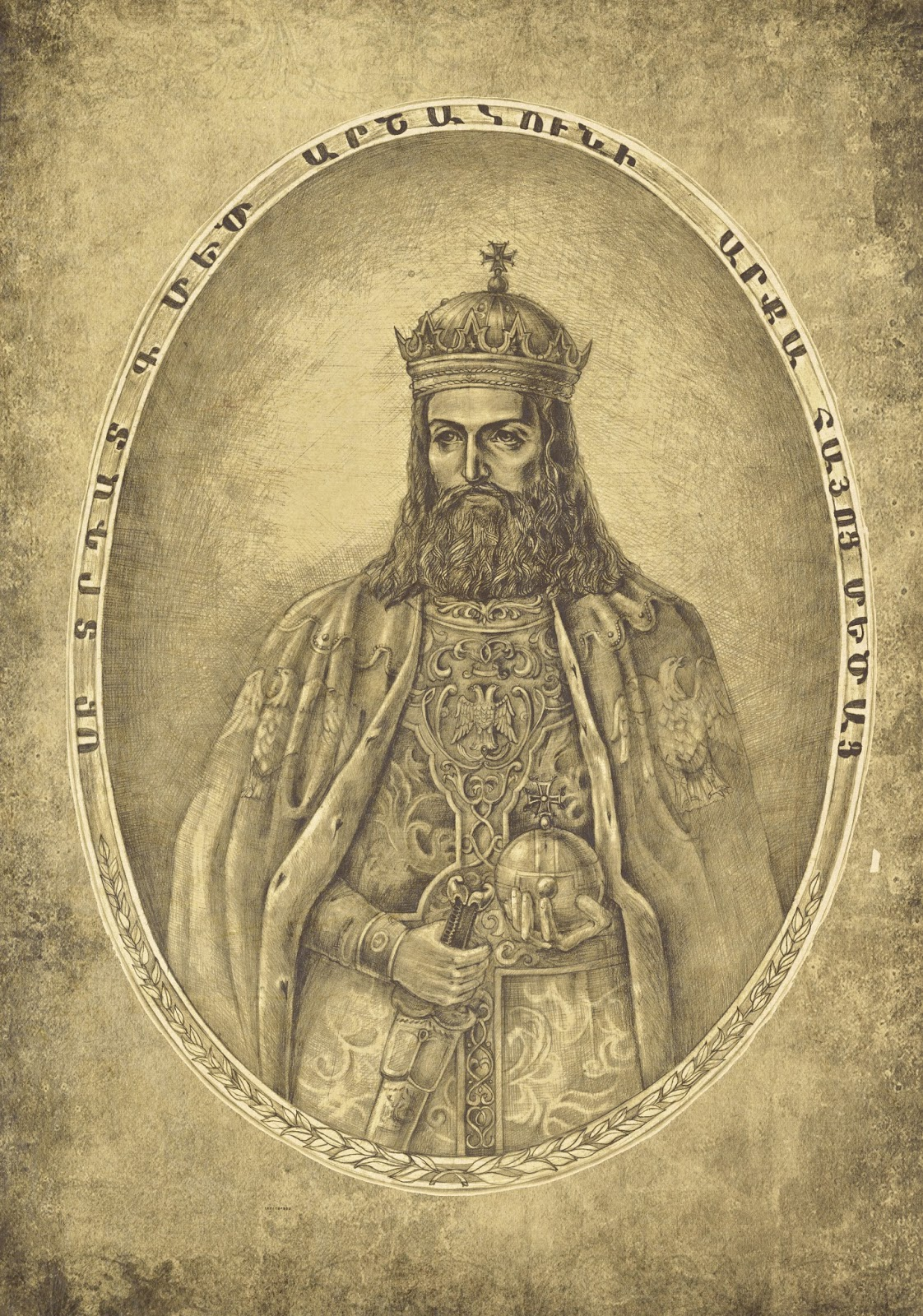
- Tiridates III the Great, the Great King of the Armenians

King of Armenia
- Resting place: Kemah, Erzincan, Turkey
- Venerated in: Eastern Orthodox Church; Oriental Orthodox churches Roman Catholic Church
- Feast: 29 November (Eastern Orthodox Church); Saturday before fifth Sunday after Pentecost (Armenian Apostolic Church)
- Attributes: Crown; Sword; Cross; Globus cruciger
- Patronage: Armenia

The traditional story of the conversion of the king and the nation is primarily based on the fifth-century Armenian history attributed to Agathangelos. It tells of Gregory the Illuminator, the son of Anak, who was brought up as a Christian and, feeling guilt for his own father's sin, joined the Armenian army and worked as a secretary to the king. Christianity in Armenia had a strong footing by the end of the 3rd century, but the nation by and large still followed Zoroastrianism. Tiridates was no exception as he too worshiped various ancient gods. During a Zoroastrian religious ceremony Tiridates ordered Gregory to place a flower wreath at the foot of the statue of the goddess Anahit in Eriza. Gregory refused, proclaiming his Christian faith. This act infuriated the king. His fury was only exacerbated when several individuals declared that Gregory was in fact, the son of Anak, the traitor who had killed Tiridates's father. Gregory was tortured and finally thrown in Khor Virap, a deep underground dungeon.

During the years of Gregory's imprisonment, a group of virgin nuns, led by Gayane, came to Armenia as they fled the Roman persecution of their Christian faith. Tiridates heard about the group and the legendary beauty of one of its members, Rhipsime. He brought them to the palace and demanded to marry the beautiful virgin; she refused. The king had the whole group tortured and killed. After this event, he fell ill and according to legend, adopted the behavior of a wild boar, aimlessly wandering around in the forest. Khosrovidukht had a dream wherein Gregory was still alive in the dungeon, and he was the only one able to cure the king. At this point it had been 13 years since his imprisonment, and the odds of him being alive were slim. They retrieved him, and, despite being incredibly malnourished, he was still alive. He was kept alive by a kind-hearted woman who threw a loaf of bread down in Khor Virap every day for him.

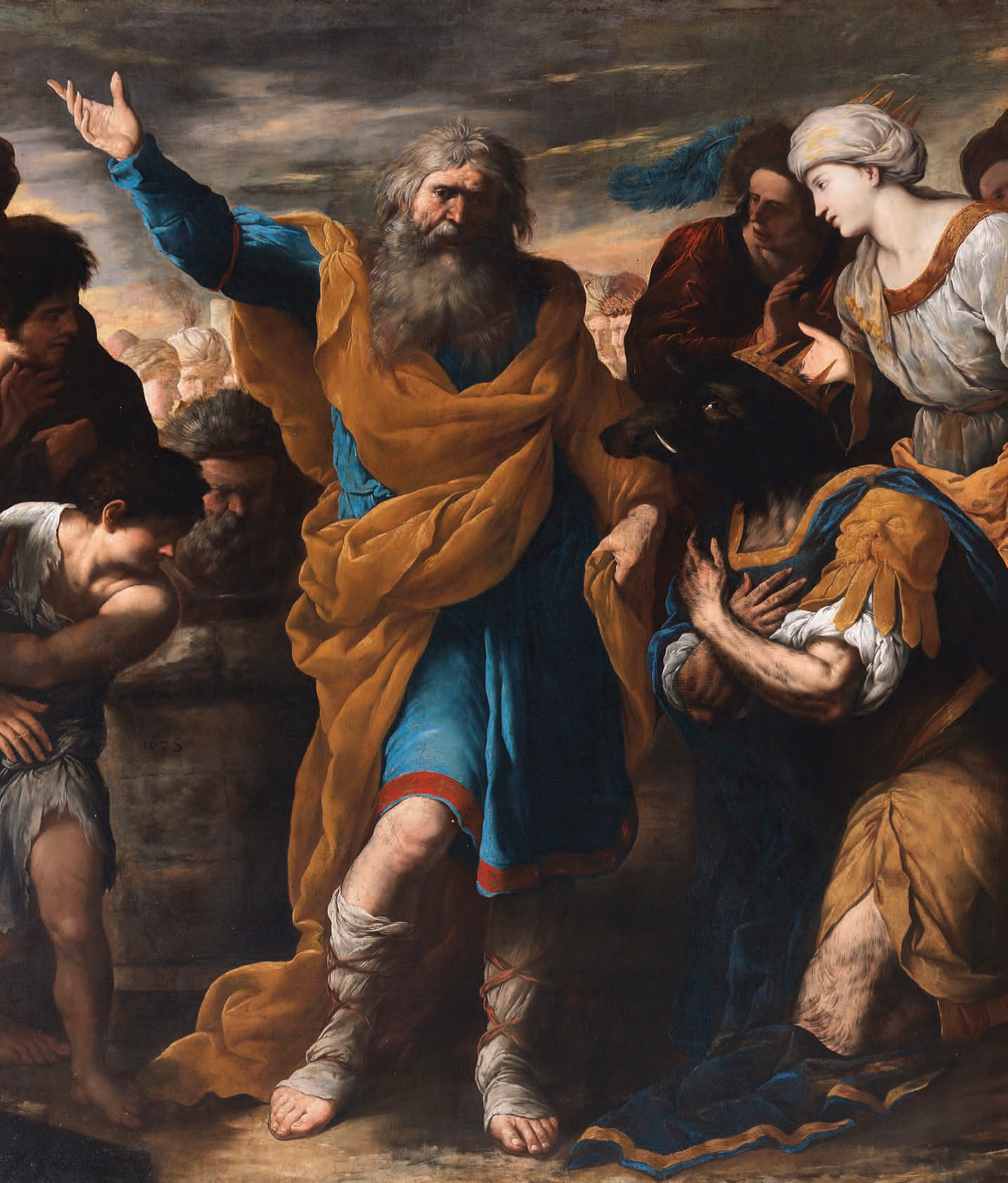
King Tiridates asks Saint Gregory to give him back his human appearance (detail) by Francesco Fracanzano, 1635

Tiridates was brought to Gregory and was miraculously cured of his illness. Persuaded by the power of the cure, the king immediately proclaimed Christianity the official state religion. Thus, Armenia became a nominally Christian kingdom and the first state to officially adopt Christianity. Tiridates appointed Gregory as Catholicos of the Armenian Apostolic Church.

The conversion to Christianity proved to be a pivotal event in Armenian history. According to the scholar of Zoroastrianism Mary Boyce, it seems that the Christianisation of Armenia by the Arsacids of Armenia was partly in defiance of the Sassanids.

== Rest of reign ==
The switch from the traditional Zoroastrianism to Christianity was not an easy one. Tiridates often used force to impose this new faith upon the people and many armed conflicts ensued, due to Zoroastrianism being deeply rooted in the Armenian people. An actual battle took place between the king's forces and the Zoroastrian camp, resulting in the weakening of polytheistic military strength. Tiridates thus spent the rest of his life trying to eliminate all ancient beliefs and in doing so destroyed countless statues, temples and written documents. As a result, little is known from local sources about ancient Armenian history and culture. The king worked feverishly to spread the faith and died in 330. Movses Khorenatsi states that several members of the nakharar families conspired against Tiridates and eventually poisoned him.

== Veneration ==
Tiridates III, Ashkhen and Khosrovidukht are saints in the Armenian Apostolic Church, and by extension all of the Oriental Orthodox Churches, and their feast day is on the Saturday after the fifth Sunday after Pentecost. On this feast day the hymn "To the Kings" is sung. Their feast day is usually around June 30.

Tiridates is venerated in the Eastern Orthodox Church, with a feast day on 29 November (according to the Julian Calendar) and 12 December (according to the Revised Julian Calendar).

== Gallery ==
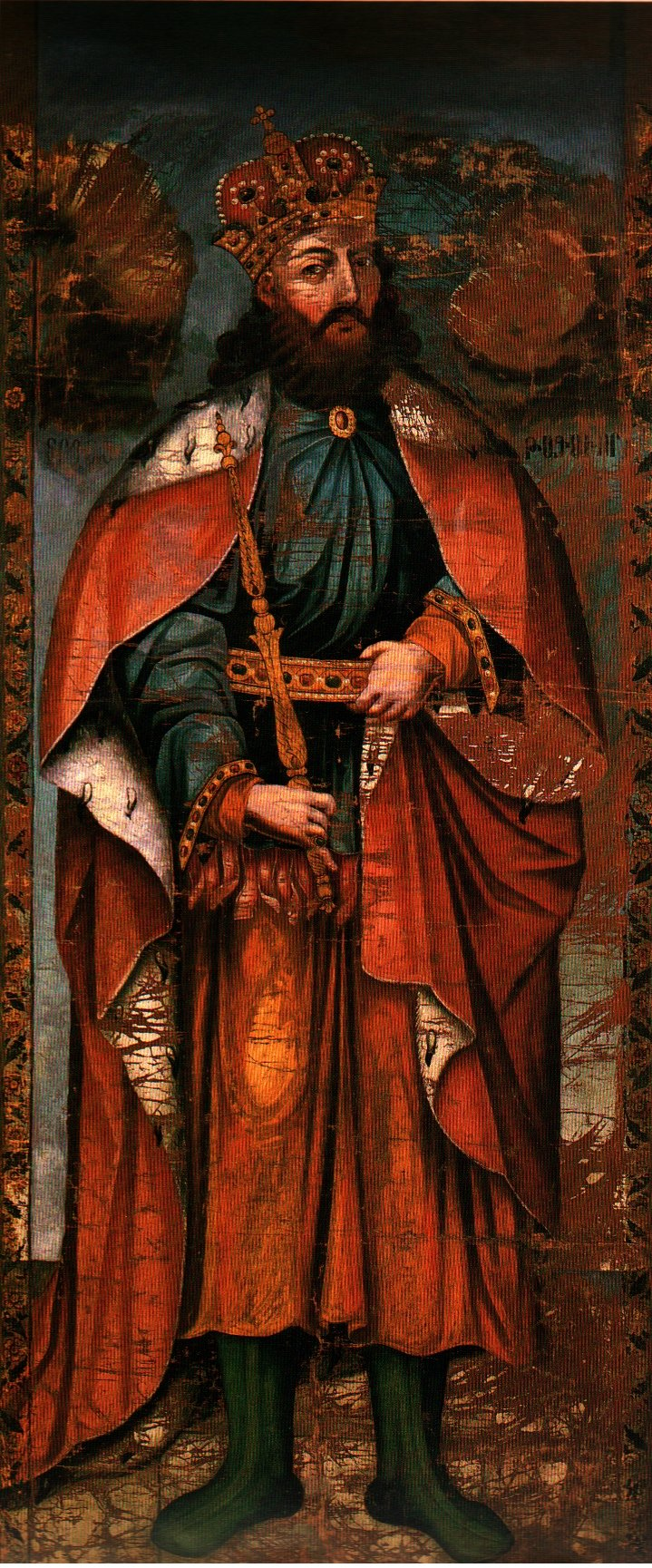
18th century illustration of Tiridates III

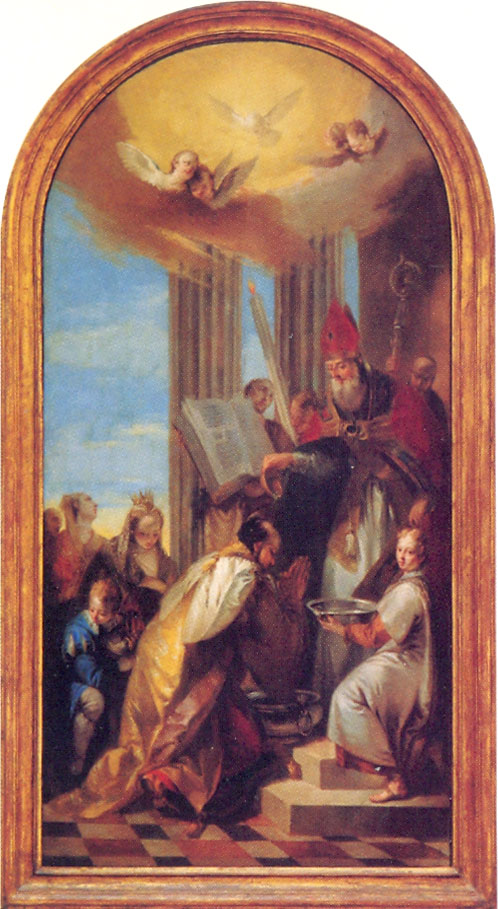
Gregory the Illuminator baptizes Tiridates III

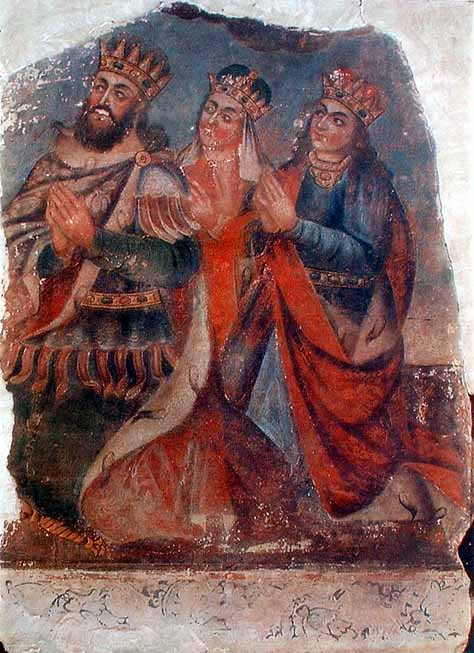
Tiridates III with his wife Ashkhen and sister Khosrovidukht by Naghash Hovnatan

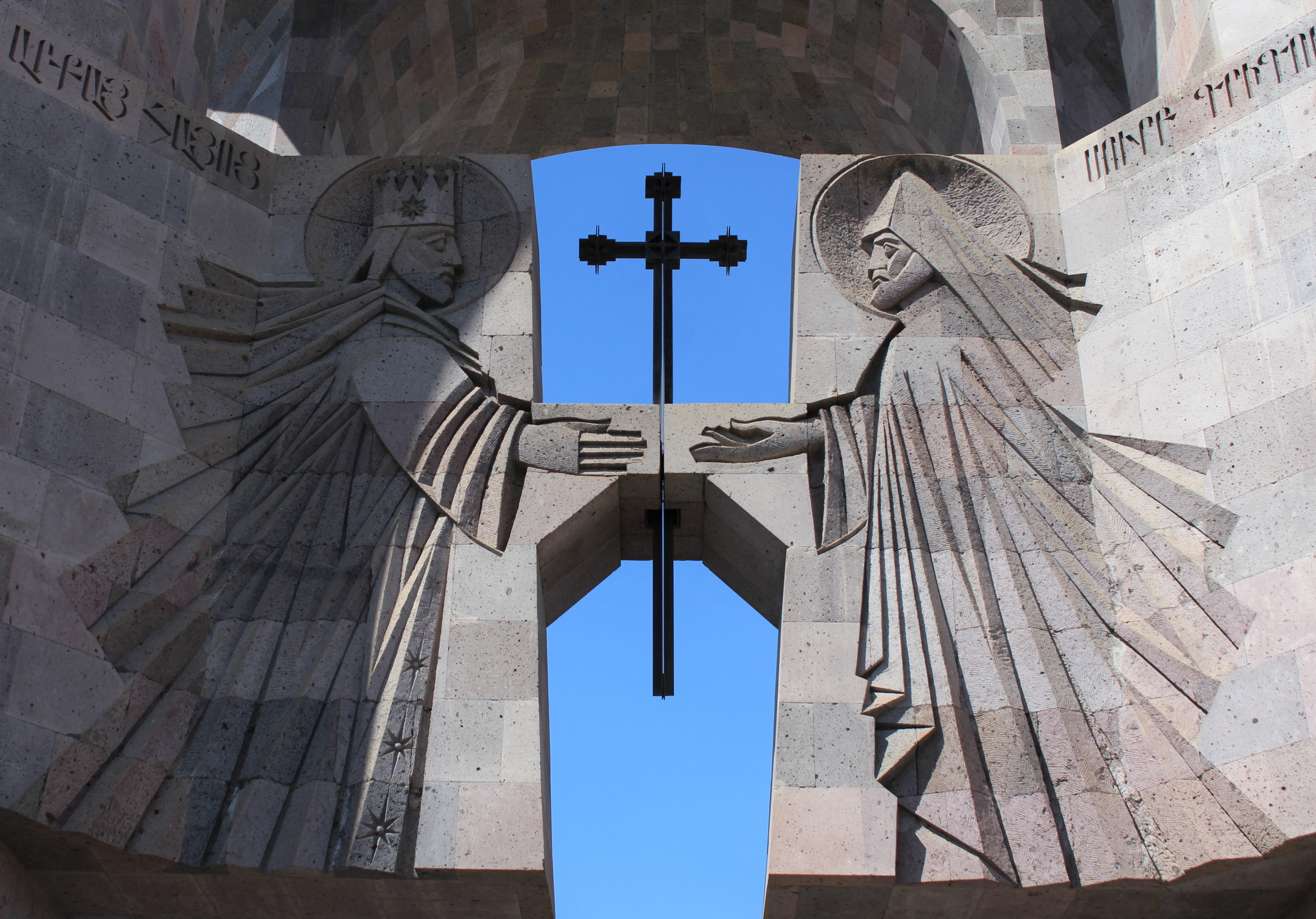
Tiridates III and Gregory the Illuminator, Echmiadzin

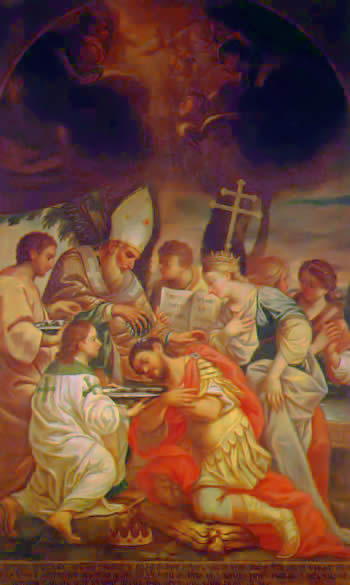
Gregory the Illuminator baptizes Tiridates III

== See also ==
- Armenian Apostolic Church
- Arsacid dynasty of Armenia
- Saint Gregory the Illuminator Cathedral, Yerevan

Tiridates III of Armenia Arsacid dynasty Born: 250 or 255 Died: 330
Preceded by Khosrov II 272–287	Tiridates the Great; 287–330	Succeeded by Khosrov III the Small 330–338
