= Anak the Parthian =

Armenian Parthian noble (died 258)

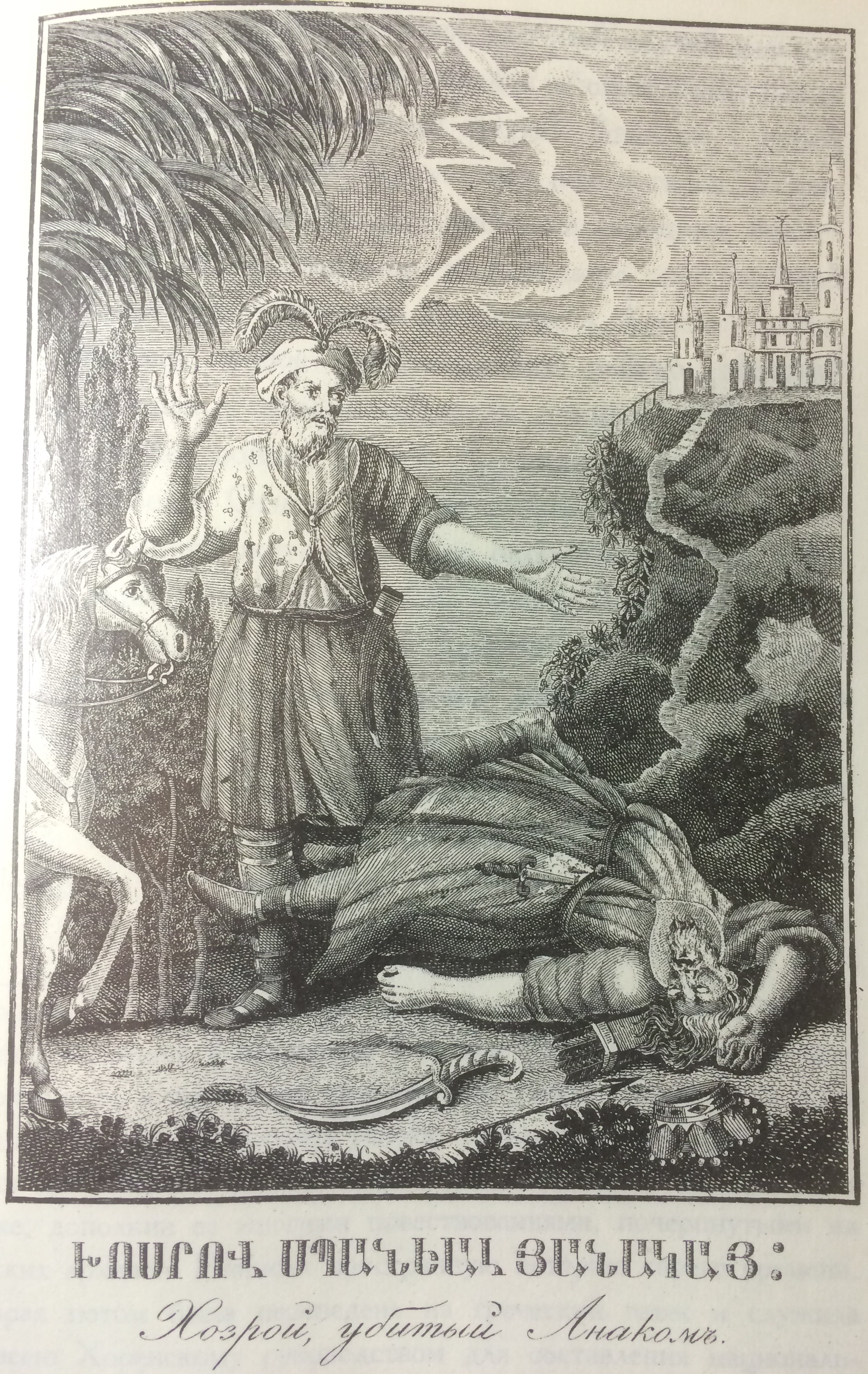
Nineteenth-century illustration of Anak's murder of King Khosrov

Anak the Parthian (Old Armenian: Անակ Պարթեւ, romanized: Anak Part῾ew; fl. third century) was a Parthian noble who, according to the Armenian tradition, was the father of Gregory the Illuminator, who converted Armenia to Christianity in the early fourth century. Anak is said to have killed King Khosrov of Armenia at the incitement of the Sasanians, leading to his own murder and the extermination of his family, except for the child Gregory, who was saved and taken to Roman territory. The details and historicity of this account have been debated by historians.

== Name ==
According to some scholars, the name Anak comes from a Parthian or Middle Persian word meaning 'evil' (anāg) and is more likely to be an epithet for the murderer of King Khosrov than an actual given name. Another interpretation gives it the meaning 'non-evil' (*an-aka-).

== Biography ==
According to the version of the history attributed to Agathangelos accepted in the Armenian literary tradition, Anak was a noble of Parthian origin who was related to the king of Armenia. The later history of Movses Khorenatsi adds that Anak was a member of the Parthian noble house of Suren. During the third-century wars between Arsacid Armenia and Sasanian Iran, Anak was recruited by the Sasanian king (whom Agathangelos calls Artashir) to assassinate King Khosrov of Armenia (probably Khosrov II), (Note: There is no conclusive chronology of the reigns of Armenian kings of the third century. Cyril Toumanoff, who rejects the historicity of the story of Anak murdering Khosrov (see the historiography section), argues that in the Armenian sources the reigns of several kings are collapsed into two very long reigns: Khosrov the Brave (who was killed by Anak) and his son Trdat the Great (who converted to Christianity in the early fourth century). According to Toumanoff, Trdat II (r. 216/7–252) fled the Sasanian takeover of Armenia; his son Khosrov II (r. 279/80–287) was made king of the western, Roman-controlled part of Armenia in 279/80; Khosrov II was killed and succeeded by his brother Trdat III; finally, Khosrov II's son Trdat IV (the Great, who converted to Christianity) was restored to the throne of eastern Armenia with Roman help in 298/9 with the Peace of Nisibis. Other scholars believe that Trdat the Great was restored to his father's throne earlier in 287.) promising to return Anak his domain as reward. Anak went to Armenia and murdered Khosrov after gaining his confidence, after which he himself was killed by angry Armenian nobles along with his whole family. Agathangelos describes the circumstances of Khosrov's murder as follows: Anak and his brother met with the king in Vagharshapat as he was preparing to campaign against the Persians and killed him with their swords. (Note: Agathangelos writes that Khosrov's murder occurred the summer after Anak's arrival in Armenia, while Movses Khorenatsi writes that Anak stayed in Armenia for two years before killing Khosrov.) They attempted to flee on horseback, but were chased down by the Armenian princes who threw them from the Taperakan bridge (over the Araxes River, near Artaxata) to their deaths. One of Anak's sons, the future Gregory the Illuminator, was rescued by his nurse and taken to Roman territory. Khosrov's son Trdat (Tiridates) was also saved and taken to Rome. After Khosrov's death, the Persians conquered Armenia. Later, Trdat returned to reclaim the Armenian throne with Roman help. Gregory, who was raised a Christian in Caesarea of Cappadocia, also returned to Armenia as an adult and eventually converted Trdat and his kingdom to Christianity. This story is repeated in all the other Armenian histories except that of Elishe, which attributes Khosrov's murder to his unnamed brothers.

=== Family ===
Anak's exact relation to Khosrov is not stated in the main Armenian version of Agathangelos, but a Karshuni recension of Agathangelos's history claims that Anak was Khosrov's brother. Anak's wife and the mother of Gregory of Illuminator is called Oguhi (Ոգուհի) in the history attributed to Zenob Glak. Agathangelos mentions two sons of Anak who survive the extermination of his house: one, Gregory, and another who is taken to Persia, although no other information is given about the latter. Khorenatsi, on the other hand, writes that only one son of Anak (i.e., Gregory) was saved. Zenob Glak refers to Gregory's brother as Suren.

== Historiography ==
Historians have struggled to reconstruct the history of Armenia in the third century and the chronology of the events described in Agathangelos and other sources. Cyril Toumanoff argues that the story of Khosrov's murder by Anak is fictional and instead favors the version in Elishe where Khosrov is murdered by his brothers. According to Toumanoff, Khosrov II (r. 279/80–287) was made king of the western, Roman-controlled part of Armenia in 279/80 and was killed and succeeded by his brother Trdat III. He suggests that the story of Khosrov's murder by an Iranian agent may have been invented later to mask "the horror of this fratricide." Marie-Louise Chaumont likewise considers the version in which Khosrov is murdered by his brothers to be more likely. According to Suren Yeremian, the Armenian king Tiridates II (called Khosrov in the Armenian sources) was assassinated by Anak in 256 on the orders of the Sasanian king Shapur I (who had recently conquered Armenia).

According to historian Nicholas Adontz, it is likely that there were originally two independent traditions about the origins of Gregory the Illuminator, both giving the founder of the Armenian church a noble origin; these traditions were combined in the main Armenian version of Agathangelos. The story of Anak serves to connect Gregory to the Arsacid dynasty as a descendant of the Parthian clan of Suren, and also makes Gregory's early life reflect that of Trdat in epic fashion. Adontz also suggests that the story of Anak may have developed under the influence of the Persian epic tradition about Ardashir, the founder of the Sasanian Empire. He notes several parallels between the story of Anak and the figure of Banak (Note: A similar character in the Shahnameh is called Tabak.) in the Middle Persian text Kār-Nāmag ī Ardašīr ī Pāpakān, as well as the similarity of their names. In Kār-Nāmag, Banak is a Parthian prince who betrays the Parthian king Ardawan (Artabanus IV) and aids his nemesis Ardashir. Both Anak and Banak are Parthians who betray a king and help Ardashir: Anak helps Ardashir by killing Khosrov, while Banak joins Ardashir against his ruler Ardawan.
