= Khosrov I =

King of Armenia from 191 to 217

King of Armenia
- Reign: 191–217
- Predecessor: Vologases II
- Successor: Tiridates II
- Died: 217
- Issue: Tiridates II
- Dynasty: Arsacid dynasty
- Father: Vologases II of Armenia
- Religion: Zoroastrianism

Khosrov I (Parthian: 𐭇𐭅𐭎𐭓𐭅; fl. second half 2nd c. - first half 3rd c., died 217) was a Parthian prince who served as a Roman client king of Armenia.

Khosrov I was one of the sons born to King Vologases II of Armenia (Vagharsh II) who is also known as Vologases V of Parthia by a mother whose name is unknown. Through his father, Khosrov I was a member of the House of Parthia and thus a relation of the Arsacid dynasty of Armenia.

In 191, Vologases II ascended the Parthian throne, and as a result relinquished the Armenian throne to Khosrov I. Throughout the 1st and 2nd-centuries, the Armenian throne was usually occupied by a close relative of the Parthian King of Kings, who held the title of "Great King of Armenia". According to the 5th-century Armenian historian Agathangelos, the king of Armenia had the second rank in the Parthian realm, below only the Parthian king. The modern historian Lee E. Patterson suggests that Agathangelos may have exaggerated the importance of his homeland. Khosrov I served as Armenian King from 191 until 217. In Armenian sources, Khosrov I is often confused with his famous grandson Khosrov II. Little is known on his life, prior to becoming King of Armenia.

Khosrov I is the King whom classical authors present as a neutral monarch towards Rome. In 195 when the Roman emperor Septimius Severus was on his great campaign to the Parthian Empire sacking the capital Ctesiphon, Khosrov I had sent gifts and hostages to Severus. As a client monarch of Rome, Khosrov I was under the protection of Septimius Severus and his successor Caracalla.

Between 214 and 216, Khosrov I with his family were held under Roman detention for unknown reasons which provoked a major uprising in Armenia against Rome. In 215, Caracalla led a Roman army and invaded Armenia to end the uprising. Khosrov I may be the Khosrov mentioned in an Egyptian inscription that speaks of Khosrov the Armenian.

In 217 when Khosrov I died, his son Tiridates II, was granted the Armenian crown by the Roman emperor Caracalla. Tiridates II was declared King of Armenia upon Caracalla's assassination which was on 8 April 217.

== Sources ==
- Schottky, Martin (2010). "Armenische Arsakiden zur Zeit der Antonine. Ein Beitrag zur Korrektur der armenischen Königsliste". ANABASIS Studia Classica et Orientalia. 1: 208–224. ISSN 2082-8993. (in German)
- C. Toumanoff, Manuel de généalogie et de chronologie pour le Caucase chrétien (Arménie, Géorgie, Albanie) [détail des éditions], p. 73
- Lang, David M (1983). "Iran, Armenia and Georgia". In Yarshater, Ehsan (ed.). The Cambridge History of Iran: The Seleucid, Parthian and Sasanian Periods. Vol. 3(1). Cambridge: Cambridge University Press. pp. 512–537. ISBN 0-521-20092-X..
- R.G. Hovannisian, The Armenian People From Ancient to Modern Times, Volume I: The Dynastic Periods: From Antiquity to the Fourteenth Century, Palgrave Macmillan, 2004
- R.P. Adalian, Historical Dictionary of Armenia, Scarecrow Press, 2010
- Patterson, Lee E. (2013). "Caracalla's Armenia". Syllecta Classica. 2. Project Muse: 27–61.
- Toumanoff, C. (1986). "Arsacids vii. The Arsacid dynasty of Armenia". Encyclopaedia Iranica, Vol. II, Fasc. 5. pp. 543–546.
