= Merozanes =

Merozanes, Mehružan, or Meruzan (in Greek Μερουζάνης, in Armenian Մերուժան) was a Christian bishop present in Armenia around 240 to 270.

The only mention of this individual, with an Iranian origin name, comes from Eusebius, who, in his Church History, states that around 250, Dionysius of Alexandria sent a letter of "repentance to the brethren in Armenia, of whom Merozanes was bishop."

Given the onomastics of the person, it is possible that he was a Syriac bishop, perhaps in Taron. Indeed, it is likely that a large Christian community already existed in this province before the arrival of Gregory the Illuminator, who would later ally himself with a Syriac chorbishop, Daniel, in order to communicate with the faithful in this region.
