= Hripsime =

Roman martyr in the 3rd century

Saint Hripsime Սուրբ Հռիփսիմէ
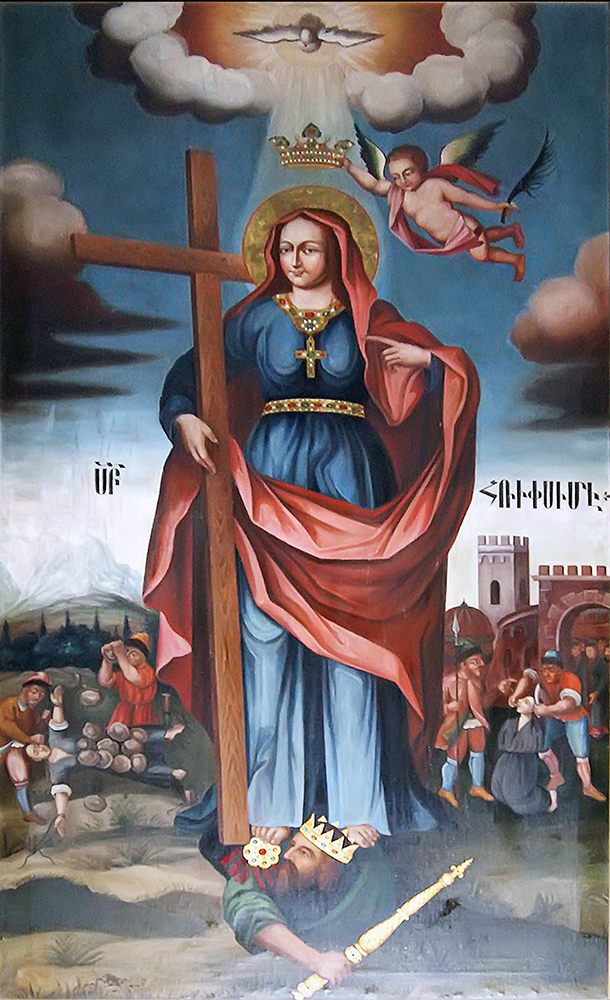
- Icon at Saint Hripsime Church in Vagharshapat

Martyr
- Born: 3rd century Rome, Italy
- Died: 9 October 290; Vagharshapat, Kingdom of Armenia
- Venerated in: Catholic Church; Eastern Orthodox Church; Oriental Orthodox Church
- Canonized: Pre-Congregation
- Major shrine: St. Hripsime Church, Echmiadzin
- Feast: 29 September (Roman Catholic Church); 30 September (Orthodox Church); 9 or 10 October (Coptic Orthodox Church); 9 or 10 October (Ethiopian Orthodox Tewahedo Church); Variable (Armenian Apostolic Church)

Hripsime (Armenian: Հռիփսիմէ; died c. 290) was a martyr of Roman origin. The story of her martyrdom is connected with the traditional account of the Christianization of Armenia. She and her companions in martyrdom are venerated as some of the first Christian martyrs of Armenia. Saint Hripsime Church in Vagharshapat, where she is buried, is one of Armenia's most visited shrines.

== Biography ==
According to the traditional account recorded in the Armenian history attributed to Agathangelos, Hripsime was a woman of noble origin who was one of a group of Christian virgins who led a monastic life in Rome, led by their mother superior Gayane. Fleeing the persecution of Christians by the Roman emperor Diocletian (r. 284–305), they come to Armenia and settle near the capital of Vagharshapat. The story says that Hripsime was selected to be Diocletian's bride in a beauty contest but refused to marry the emperor. Diocletian sends a letter to the king of Armenia, Tiridates, informing him about the nuns' escape and saying that if Tiridates so wishes, he can keep Hripsime for himself. Tiridates has Hripsime brought to the palace, but despite his physical strength he is unable to overpower her and she escapes. Finally, Hripsime and the other nuns (a total of 37 out of more than 70 who came to Armenia) are put to death:

Then they came forward and tore the clothes from their limbs and bound each one to four stakes. They pierced the skin of their soles and put in tubes, and by blowing they flayed the three saints alive, from their feet to their breasts. They pierced their gullets and pulled out their tongues. They forced stones into their entrails, eviscerating them. And because they were still alive they then cut off their heads with a sword.

In the story, the martyrdom of the nuns is followed by Tiridates's partial transformation into the form of a wild boar as divine punishment, along with other afflictions affecting the king's household and the entire capital. Tiridates's sister receives a vision showing her that Gregory, a Christian imprisoned and tortured on Tiridates's orders for his faith, must be released to stop the torments. Gregory is released and Tiridates is cured. The bodies of the martyred nuns, which had remained unburied for nine days, are buried and shrines are built over their graves. The king and the Armenian people are converted to Christianity. Later, the churches of Saint Gayane and Saint Hripsime were built on the sites of the saints' graves. Catholicos Komitas (r. 615–628) demolished the small martyrium and constructed the present Church of Saint Hripsime in 618. According to the medieval historian Stepanos Orbelian, the relics of Hripsime were in the possession of the Armenian catholicoi until 1292, when the Mamluks took them to Egypt after the capture of Hromkla, then the seat of the catholicos.

In Nicholas Adontz's opinion, the martyrology of Hripsime and Gayane (who may have been historical figures) originally existed as a separate story which was later combined with the story of Tiridates and Gregory and the conversion of Armenia. Adontz notes the story of Diocletian's wife Prisca and daughter Galeria Valeria as a possible historical basis; Prisca and Valeria supposedly converted to Christianity and were exiled to Mesopotamia by Emperor Maximinus Daza after Valeria refused to marry him. The name Hripsime is derived in Agathangelos from the Greek word ῥίπτω 'to throw', which can refer to the exposure of children, although there is no indication in Agathangelos that Hripsime was a foundling. Nerses Akinian hypothesizes that Hripsime was a slave girl based on an unattested meaning of ῥίπτω as 'to imprison'. Robert W. Thomson rejects the connection between Hripsime and ῥίπτω as a folk etymology. According to Nina Garsoïan, the victory of Hripsime over Tiridates, whose transformation into a boar reflects his identification with the Armenian-Zoroastrian deity Vahagn, represents the victory of the Christian God over the Zoroastrian one.

According to B. Outtier and M. Thierry, it is unlikely that people from Italy would choose to take refuge in a country as far from Rome as Armenia, and onomastic evidence suggests a connection more with Asia Minor than with the Latin-speaking world. It is more probable that the nuns came from Constantinople (the "New Rome") or western Asia Minor.

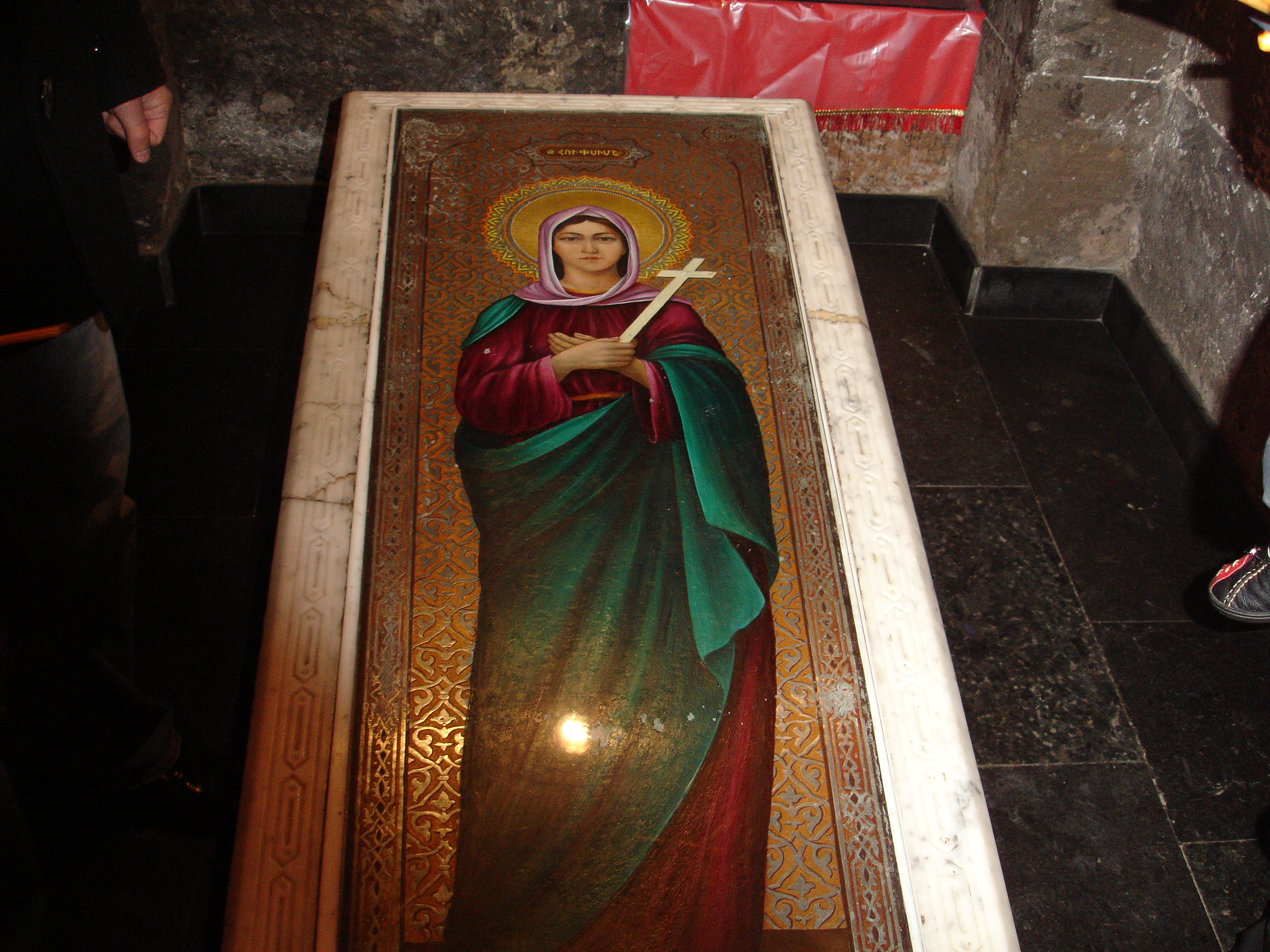
Tomb of Saint Hripsime in Saint Hripsime Church

== Veneration ==
The Armenian Apostolic Church remembers Hripsime and her companions on the day after the Second Sunday of Easter (i.e. the second Monday after Easter). The Eastern Orthodox churches commemorate Hripsime and her companions and Gayane and her companions on 30 September, while the Catholic Church commemorates them on 29 September. The Coptic Orthodox Church commemoratese them on Thout 29 of the Coptic calendar (9 October on the Gregorian calendar in a common year).

Saint Hripsime is one of the most venerated saints in Ethiopia. She is known as "Arsema" (አርሴማ) to Ethiopian Orthodox Christians. Currently there are three well known churches and monasteries named after her in Ethiopia. Among the churches, the oldest one, is found in one of the Lake Tana islands. There are many old icons in the church portraying how she was martyred by Tiridates III (Dirtadis in Ethiopian languages) and how the cruel king was changed into a beast after killing her. There is annual pilgrimage by Ethiopian Christians to this church in January. There are also Christian songs praising her faith and martyrdom. The book entitled Gedle Arsema, meaning "Martyr Arsema", is found almost in every spiritual bookshop throughout Ethiopia. Her story is told in the Ethiopian Synaxarium on Mäskäräm 29 (which equates to 26 or 27 September on the Julian Calendar, and 9 or 10 October on the Gregorian calendar) which coincides with the date of the saint's martyrdom.

== In art ==
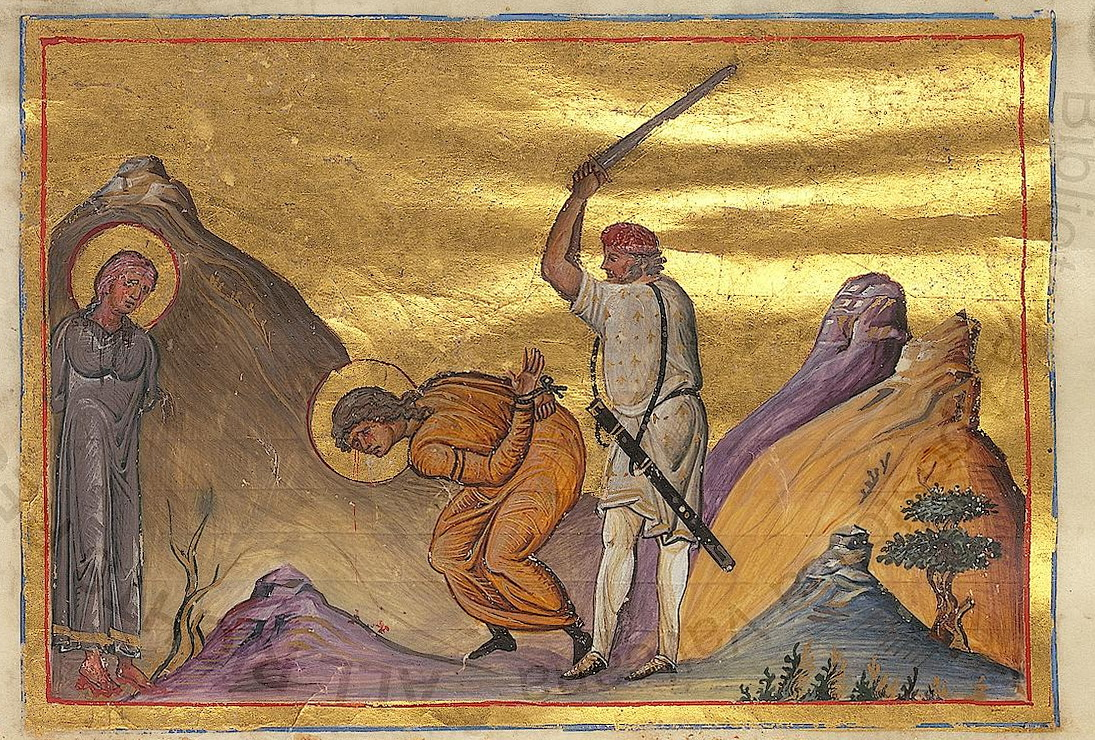
Miniature depicting the martyrdom of Hripsime and Gayane in the Menologion of Basil II

The hagiography of Hripsime and her companions was preserved in the Armenian histories of Agathangelos and Movses Khorenatsi and spread throughout the Christian world. In 618, the Armenian catholicos Komitas Aghtsetsi wrote a hymn (sharakan) dedicated to them on the occasion of the consecration of Saint Hripsime Church. The martyrdom of Hripsime and Gayane is depicted in a miniature in the Menologion of Basil II.

The earliest surviving Armenian tragedy, The Martyrdom of St. Hripsime, was written in 1668 by Louis Marie Pidou, the head of the Theatine school in Lvov. (The Armenian community of Lvov had accepted papal supremacy in 1635.) The play is written according to neoclassical dramatic conventions and preaches unity with Rome: in the epilogue, Hripsime's spirit promises intercession on behalf of the Armenians as long they remain faithful to the church of her homeland. Some later Armenian plays with the same theme appear to have drawn inspiration from this work.
