= Suren Yeremian =

Armenian historian (1908–1992)

- Born: April 10, 1908; Tiflis, Russian Empire
- Died: December 17, 1992 (aged 84); Yerevan, Armenia
- Education: Yerevan State University
- Known for: Armenia According to the Ashkharatsuyts (Yerevan, 1963)
- Awards: Order of the October Revolution; Order of the Red Banner of Labour
- Scientific career
- Fields: Armenian studies, history of Armenia
- Workplaces: Armenian Academy of Sciences (from 1963), Institute of History of National Academy of Sciences of Armenia

Suren Tigrani Yeremian (Armenian: Սուրեն Տիգրանի Երեմյան; Russian: Сурен Тигранович Еремян; 10 April [O.S. 28 March] 1908 – 17 December 1992) was a Soviet historian and cartographer who specialized in the study of the early history and geography of Armenia and the Caucasus. He devoted nearly thirty years of his scholarly efforts in reconstructing the Ashkharhatsuyts, a seventh-century atlas commonly attributed to Anania Shirakatsi.

== Biography ==
=== Early life and education ===
Yeremian was born into a family of laborers in Tiflis, in 1908 and attended a local Russian school. He was an avid reader of history books and his interest in Armenian history grew especially when he read the famous study by Nicholas Adontz, Armenia in the Period of Justinian. He moved to Armenia, where he was accepted to Yerevan State University.

He studied history and economics and graduated from university in 1931. From 1935 until 1941, Yeremian worked at the Academy of Sciences of the Soviet Union's department of Oriental studies in Leningrad. While there, Yeremian taught Armenian history at Leningrad State University's Department of History and Philology. He defended his dissertation, entitled "The Feudal Organization of Kartli during the Marzpanate Period."

In 1941, he moved back to Yerevan and continued his studies at the Institute of Material Culture and History, which was still under the auspices of the Soviet Academy of Sciences. He became a professor in 1953, having defended his second dissertation, "The Social Structure of Ancient Armenia," at Moscow State University. He held the position of director of the department of history from 1953 to 1958 and in 1963 was inducted as a member of the Armenian National Academy of Sciences.

=== Academic research ===
It was during this time that Yeremian shifted his focus to composing historical atlases. One of his most signal contributions was his study of a seventh-century Armenian atlas, the Ashkharatsuyts. He spent a great deal of his energies in not only translating and researching the background behind the atlas but also on the supposed author of the work, Anania Shirakatsi. In 1963, his Armenia According to the Ashkharatsuyts was published, although Yeremian would in subsequent years go on to revise and update some of the views, most notably coming to the conclusion that Anania Shirakatsi was its true author, that he had concluded in the work. He also contributed in writing several articles in the USSR Historical Atlas. Yeremian was also one of the key advocates who pushed for the publication of the History of the Armenian People (Yerevan, 1971–1984, 8 volumes), authoring numerous articles on the origins of the Armenian people, the kingdom of Urartu, and on the social, economic, cultural and political structure of the Kingdom of Armenia. He would also go on to write numerous articles in the Armenian Soviet Encyclopedia.

He struggled with a serious illness for many years, and died in 1992.

== Selected works ==
- (1963) Hayastaně ěst «Ashkharhatsʻoytsʻ»-i Հայաստանը ըստ «Աշխարհացոյց»-ի [Armenia according to the "Ashkharhatsuyts"] (in Armenian). Yerevan: Haykakan SSṚ GA hratarakchʻutʻyun.
