= Council of Dvin =

Council of Dvin may refer to:

- First Council of Dvin (506)
- Second Council of Dvin (554)
- Third Council of Dvin (607)
- Fourth Council of Dvin (648)
