= List of catholicoi of all Armenians =

This is a list of the catholicoi of all Armenians (Armenian: Ամենայն Հայոց Կաթողիկոս), head bishops of the Armenian Apostolic Church (Armenian: Հայ Առաքելական Եկեղեցի). To this day 21 Catholicoi of a total of 132 have been glorified within the church.

== Catholicoi of Armenia ==
(Name in English, name in Armenian, dates)

=== Apostolic era ===
Order	Name of Patriarch		Dates	Notes
Order	English	Armenian	Dates	Notes
1	St. Thaddeus the Apostle	Սբ. Թադևոս Առաքյալ	(43–66)	
2	St. Bartholomew the Apostle	Սբ. Բարդուղիմեոս Առաքյալ	(60–68)	
3	St. Zacharias	Սբ. Զաքարիա	(68–72)	
4	St. Zementus	Սբ. Զեմենդոս	(72–76)	
5	St. Atrnerseh	Սբ. Ատրներսեհ	(76–92)	
6	St. Mushe	Սբ. Մուշե	(93–123)	
7	St. Shahen	Սբ. Շահեն	(124–150)	
8	St. Shavarsh	Սբ. Շավարշ	(151–171)	
9	St. Leontius	Սբ. Ղեոնդիոս	(172–190)	

=== Sophene era ===
Order	Name of Patriarch		Dates	Notes
Order	English	Armenian	Dates	Notes
10	St. Merozanes	Սբ. Մերուժան	(240–270)	
vacant			(270–288)	
11	St. Gregory I the Illuminator	Սբ. Գրիգոր Ա Պարթև (Լուսավորիչ)	(288–301)	

=== First Echmiadzin era (301–452) ===
Arsacid dynasty (from 301 to 428 the episcopal office is hereditary)

- St. Gregory I the Illuminator (301–325) -- Սբ. Գրիգոր Ա Պարթև (Լուսավորիչ)
- St. Aristaces I (325–333) -- Սբ. Արիստակես Ա Պարթև
- St. Vrtanes I (333–341) -- Սբ. Վրթանես Ա Պարթև
- St. Husik I (341–347) -- Սբ. Հուսիկ Ա Պարթև

Assyrian descent

- Daniel I of Armenia (347) -- Դանիել Ա

Ashishatts dynasty

- Pharen I of Armenia (348–352) -- Փառեն Ա Աշտիշատցի

Arsacid dynasty

- St. Nerses I the Great (353–373) -- Սբ. Ներսես Ա Մեծ (Պարթև)

Albaniosid dynasty

- Sahak I (373–377) -- Սահակ Ա Մանազկերտցի
- Zaven I (377–381) -- Զավեն Ա Մանազկերտցի
- Aspuraces I (381–386) -- Ասպուրակես Ա Մանազկերտցի

Arsacid dynasty

- St. Sahak I (387–428) -- Սբ. Սահակ Ա Պարթև

Assyrian descent

- Brkisho of Armenia (428–432) -- Բրկիշո
- Samuel of Armenia (432–437) -- Սամվել

Non-Hereditary Bishop

- St. Hovsep I (437–452) -- Սբ. Հովսեփ Ա Հողոցմեցի

=== Dvin era (452–927) ===
- Melitus I (452–456) -- Մելիտե Ա Մանազկերտցի
- Movses I (456–461) -- Մովսես Ա Մանազկերտցի
- St. Gyut I (461–478) -- Սբ. Գյուտ Ա Արահեզացի
- St. John I (478–490) -- Սբ. Հովհաննես Ա Մանդակունի
- Babken I (490–516) -- Բաբկեն Ա Ոթմսեցի
- Samuel I (516–526) -- Սամվել Ա Արծկեցի
- Mushe I (526–534) -- Մուշե Ա Այլաբերցի
- Sahak II (534–539) -- Սահակ Բ Ուղկեցի
- Christopher I (539–545) -- Քրիստափոր Ա Տիրառիջցի
- Ghevond I (545–548) -- Ղեվոնդ Ա Եռաստեցի
- Nerses II (548–557) -- Ներսես Բ Բագրևվանդցի
- John II (557–574) -- Հովհաննես Բ Գաբեղենցի
- Movses II (574–604) -- Մովսես Բ. Եղիվարդեցի
  - vacant 604–607, administered by Verthanes Qerthol the Grammarian -- Վրթանես Քերթող
- Abraham I (607–615) -- Աբրահամ Ա Աղբաթանեցի
- Komitas I (615–628) -- Կոմիտաս Ա Աղցեցի
- Christopher II (628–630), died aft. 630 — Քրիստափոր Բ Ապահունի
- Ezra (630–641) -- Եզր Ա Փառաժնակերտցի
- Nerses III the Builder (641–661) -- Ներսես Գ Տայեցի (Շինարար)
- Anastasius I (661–667) -- Անաստաց Ա Ակոռեցի
- Israel I (667–677) -- Իսրայել Ա Ոթմսեցի
- Sahak III (677–703) -- Սահակ Գ. Ձորոփորեցի
- Elias I (703–717) -- Եղիա Ա Արճիզեցի
- Saint John III the Philosopher (717–728) -- Սբ. Հովհաննես Գ Օձնեցի (Փիլիսոփա)
- David I (728–741) -- Դավիթ Ա Արամոնեցի
- Dertad I (741–764) -- Տրդատ Ա Ոթմսեցի
- Dertad II (764–767) -- Տրդատ Բ Դասնավորեցի
- Sion I (767–775) -- Սիոն Ա Բավոնեցի
- Isaiah I (775–788) -- Եսայի Ա Եղիպատրուշեցի
- Stephen I (788–790) -- Ստեփանոս Ա Դվնեցի
- Joab I (790–791) -- Յովաբ Ա Դվնեցի
- Solomon I (791–792) -- Սողոմոն Ա Գառնեցի
- George I (792–795) -- Գևորգ Ա Բյուրականցի
- Joseph I (795–806) -- Հովսեփ Բ Փարպեցի
- David II (806–833) -- Դավիթ Բ Կակաղեցի
- John IV (833–855) -- Հովհաննես Դ Ավայեցի
- Zacharias I (855–876) -- Զաքարիա Ա Ձագեցի
- Gevorg II (877–897) -- Գևորգ Բ Գառնեցի
- Mashdotz I (897–898) -- Մաշտոց Ա Եղվարդեցի

=== Aghtamar era (927–947) ===
- John V the Historian (898–929) -- Հովհաննես Ե Դրասխանակերտցի
- Stephen II (929–930) -- Ստեփանոս Բ Ռշտունի
- Theodore I (930–941) -- Թեոդորոս Ա Ռշտունի
- Yeghishe I (941–946) -- Եղիշե Ա Ռշտունի

=== Arghina era (947–992) ===
- Ananias I (949–968) -- Անանիա Ա Մոկացի
- Vahan I (968–969) -- Վահան Ա Սյունեցի
- Stephen III (969–972) -- Ստեփանոս Գ Սևանցի
- Khachig I (973–992) -- Խաչիկ Ա Արշարունի

=== Ani era (992–1058) ===
- Sarkis I (992–1019), d. aft. 1019 — Սարգիս Ա Սևանցի
- Peter I (1019–1058) -- Պետրոս Ա Գետադարձ

During this time the see was transferred to Cilicia, from 1058 until 1441 (see List of Armenian catholicoi of Cilicia for continued succession).

== Catholicoi of the Mother See of Holy Echmiadzin and All Armenians ==
=== Second Echmiadzin era (1441–present) ===
Portrait	Name of Patriarch		Dates	Notes
Portrait	English	Armenian	Dates	Notes
	Giragos I	Կիրակոս Ա Վիրապեցի	(1441–1443)	
	Gregory X	Գրիգոր Ժ Ջալալբեկյանց	(1443–1465)	
	Aristaces II	Արիստակես Բ Աթոռակալ	(1465–1469)	Coadjutor
	Sarkis II the Relic-Carrier	Սարգիս Բ Աջատար	(1469–1474)	
	John VII the Relic-Bearer	Հովհաննես Է Աջակիր	(1474–1484)	Died 1506
	Sarkis III the Other	Սարգիս Գ Մյուսայլ	(1484–1515)	
	Zacharias II	Զաքարիա Բ Վաղարշապատցի	(1515–1520)	
	Sarkis IV	Սարգիս Դ Վրաստանցի	(1520–1536)	
	Gregory XI	Գրիգոր ԺԱ Բյուզանդացի	(1536–1545)	
	Stepanos V	Ստեփանոս Ե Սալմաստեցի	(1545–1567)	
	Michael I	Միքայել Ա Սեբաստացի	(1567–1576)	
	Gregory XII	Գրիգոր ԺԲ Վաղարշապատցի	(1576–1590)	
	David IV	Դավիթ Դ Վաղարշապատցի	(1590–1629)	Died 1633
	Movses III	Մովսես Գ Տաթևացի	(1629–1632)	
	Philip I	Փիլիպոս Ա Աղբակեցի	(1633–1655)	
	Jacob IV	Հակոբ Դ Ջուղայեցի	(1655–1680)	
	Eliazar I	Եղիազար Ա Այնթափցի	(1681–1691)	
	Nahabed I	Նահապետ Ա Եդեսացի	(1691–1705)	
	Alexander I	Ալեքսանդր Ա Ջուղայեցի	(1706–1714)	
	Asdvadzadur	Աստվածատուր Ա Համադանցի	(1715–1725)	
	Karapet II	Կարապետ Բ Ուլնեցի	(1726–1729)	
	Abraham II	Աբրահամ Բ Խոշաբեցի	(1730–1734)	
	Abraham III	Աբրահամ Գ Կրետացի	(1734–1737)	
	Lazar I	Ղազար Ա Ջահկեցի	(1737–1751)	
	Minas I	Մինաս Ա Ակնեցի	(1751–1753)	
	Alexander II	Ալեքսանդր Բ Բյուզանդացի	(1753–1755)	
	Sahak V	Սահակ Ե	(1755)	Elected but never consecrated
Seat vacant (1755–1759)
	Jacob V	Հակոբ Ե Շամախեցի	(1759–1763)	
	Simeon I	Սիմոն Ա Երևանցի	(1763–1780)	
	Ghukas I	Ղուկաս Ա Կարնեցի	(1780–1799)	
	Hovsep II	Հովսեփ Բ	(1800)	Elected but never consecrated; died 1801
	David V	Դավիթ Ե Էնեգեթցի (Ղորղանյան)	(1801–1807)	
	Daniel II	Դանիել Բ Սուրմառեցի	(1802–1808)	
	Yeprem I	Եփրեմ Ա Ձորագեղցի	(1809–1830)	Died 1835
	John VIII	Հովհաննես Ը Կարբեցի	(1831–1842)	
	Nerses V	Ներսես Ե. Աշտարակեցի	(1843–1857)	
	Matthew I	Մատթէոս Ա Կոնստանդնուպոլսեցի (Չուխաճեան)	(1858–1865)	
	Gevorg IV	Գէորգ Դ Կոնստանդնուպոլսեցի (Քէրեստեճեան)	(1866–1882)	
Seat vacant (1882–1885)
	Magar	Մակար Ա. Թեղուտցի	(1885–1891)	
	Mkrtich I Khrimian	Մկրտիչ Ա Վանեցի (Խրիմեան Հայրիկ)	(1892–1907)	
	Matthew II Izmirlian	Մատթևոս Բ Կոնստանդնուպոլսեցի (Իզմիրլեան)	(1908–1910)	
	Gevorg V	Գևորգ Ե Սուրենեանց (Տփղիսեցի)	(1911–1930)	
Seat vacant (1930–1932)
	Khoren I	Խորեն Ա Մուրադբեկեան (Տփղիսեցի)	(1932–1938)	Likely murdered by the NKVD
Seat vacant (1938–1945)
	Gevorg VI	Գևորգ Զ Չորեքչյան (Նորնախիջևանցի)	(1945–1954)	
	Vazgen I	Վազգեն Ա Պալճյան (Բուխարեստցի)	(1955–1994)	
	Karekin I	Գարեգին Ա Սարգիսյան (Քեսաբցի)	(1994–1999)	Previously served as the Catholicos of Cilicia from 1983 to 1994 as Karekin II
	Karekin II	Գարեգին Բ Ներսիսյան (Ոսկեհատցի)	(1999–present)	

== Non-canonical patriarchs of Armenia (schismatics) ==
This section lists brief, regional spiritual leaders who were given the title Catholicos but are outside the canonical succession listed above. They usually appeared in response to imperial edicts or other regional shifts. Most didn’t last long enough to create a rival lineage.

These claimants are sometimes called Anti-Catholicos by scholars, imitating the Roman Church’s Antipopes.

- John of Bagaran Հովհաննես Բագարանցի ; 593-611. Avan line
- Davit I of Aghtamar (Դավիթ Ա) (1113 – c. 1165), founder of the Catholicosate of Aghtamar

== See also ==
- List of Armenian catholicoi of Cilicia
- List of Armenian patriarchs of Constantinople
- List of Armenian patriarchs of Jerusalem
- List of Armenian Catholic patriarchs of Cilicia
- List of patriarchs of the Church of the East
- List of Patriarchs of the Catholicosate of Aghtamar
