= Peter I of Armenia =

- Պետրոս Ա Գետադարձ
- Born: unknown
- Died: 1058; Sebastia
- Resting place: Surb Nshan Monastery
- Occupation: Religious leader
- Known for: Catolicos for All Armenians
- Term: 1019-1058

Peter I (died 1058), known as Petros Getadardz (Պետրոս Ա. Գետադարձ) in Armenian, was the Catholicos of the Armenian Apostolic Church between 1019 and 1058. He was the brother of a former Catholicos Khachik I. He was the author of several works of sermons, anthems, and elegies on early Christian martyrs.

Peter I played an important political role in the last years of Bagratid Armenia. In 1022, he negotiated a treaty with the Byzantine emperor Basil II which willed the Bagratid kingdom of Ani to the Byzantine Empire after the death of the current king, Hovhannes-Smbat III. His pro-Byzantine stance caused significant controversy. In 1037, Hovhannes-Smbat unsuccessfully attempted to have him removed from office. After Hovhannes-Smbat's death, Peter pushed his successor Gagik II to go before the Byzantine emperor in Constantinople, in the meantime sending the Emperor the keys to the city of Ani. After the fall of Ani to the Byzantines, Peter was held in Constantinople for four years before being allowed to settle in Sebasteia, where he remained until his death. He was succeeded by his nephew Khachik II.

Although Peter I had hoped to strengthen his authority as Catholicos by helping the Byzantines annex Armenia, he soon found that the Empire also intended to end the independence of the Armenian Church. In his later years he commissioned a theological treatise criticizing dyophysitism and maintaining the miaphysite position of the Armenian Church.

Some studies divide Peter I’s pontificate into two periods: 1019–1036 and 1038–1058. Nina Garsoian describes him as a “mysterious figure,” emphasizing his considerable influence on the ecclesiastical and political life of his time.

Peter’s election took place when Sarkis I was about ninety years old and no longer had sufficient political support to manage the situation in the country. At the beginning of Hovhannes-Smbat’s reign, the king needed the Church’s support in facing new challenges. Vardan Areveltsi records that Sarkis anointed Peter in Ani with great ceremony. A surviving document describes the chosen candidate as “Lord Peter, of a noble family, distinguished by grace and stature.” The details of the episcopal assembly held in Ani for the ordination have not survived. According to historian K. Matevosyan, Sarkis could not have resigned during the reign of Gagik I; his resignation therefore took place at the beginning of Hovhannes-Smbat’s reign. Peter’s election involved the direct intervention of Hovhannes-Smbat and discreet support from the Byzantine authorities.

== Biography ==
Peter I was the brother of an earlier catholicos, Khachik I, and the nephew of another catholicos, Ananias I. He succeeded Catholicos Sarkis I in 1019, while the latter was still alive, and was anointed by his predecessor at Ani.

Peter belonged to the new Catholicosal dynasty established by Ananias I Mokatsi. A lectionary dating to 1404 states that Peter came from Shirak, “from a free/noble household,” and identifies him as a member of a distinguished and respected family from Kamrjadzor. The generally accepted view is that Peter was the nephew of Ananias I Mokatsi and the brother of Khachik I Arsharuni. Maghakia Ormanian questioned this interpretation and suggested that Peter may instead have been the son of Khachik I’s brother; the approximately fifty-year age difference between Khachik and Peter lends some support to this alternative. On the basis of the description “distinguished by grace and stature,” Peter is thought to have been about forty when elected, which would place his birth in the early 980s. During the final years of Sarkis I’s catholicosate, Peter was probably his assistant and a close member of the Catholicosate’s staff. The succession within this family is described as passing from Ananias Mokatsi to his nephew Khachik I, then to Khachik’s brother Peter, and finally to Peter’s nephew Khachik II.

There is little direct information about Peter’s education. Hrachya Acharian reports that he studied at a monastery in Trebizond. It is also suggested that he received his initial education at the monastic schools of Argina and Ani. His command of Greek literature, particularly philosophy, has led scholars to suppose that he spent time in Constantinople and attended its schools. Peter was regarded as one of the most learned clerics of his age: he was familiar not only with Greek but also with Syriac and Arabic literature and sciences. The letters of Grigor Magistros Pahlavuni attest to the depth of his learning and praise his intellectual preparation.

The beginning of his patriarchate coincided with a succession crisis in the Bagratid kingdom of Ani: after King Gagik I's death in 1020, his sons Hovhannes-Smbat and Ashot IV competed for the throne. Peter took the side of Hovhannes-Smbat. In 1021, the crisis was resolved through the mediation of the Catholicos and the nobility, resulting in the division of the kingdom. The city of Ani and its surroundings went to the elder son, Hovhannes-Smbat, while the rest of the kingdom went to Ashot.

During the struggle, Ashot IV sought assistance first from Senekerim, king of Vaspurakan, and then from the Abbasid caliphate. With the troops he obtained, he attacked Hovhannes-Smbat’s territories and reached the outskirts of Ani. In the subsequent clashes, Ashot severely wounded the Georgian king Gurgen. Through the mediation of the princes of Ani and their allies, the brothers reached a settlement: Ashot received most of the kingdom, while Ani and the right of succession remained with Hovhannes-Smbat, on the condition that the crown would pass to Ashot after Hovhannes-Smbat’s death.

Peter’s influence extended beyond ecclesiastical affairs. He could affect royal authority, and his political and spiritual weight rested not only on his religious standing but also on the Armenian Church’s economic resources and material wealth. Scholars differ in their assessment of his political conduct. Some argue that Peter did not consciously seek to weaken or destroy Armenian statehood, and that his actions should be understood in the context of the difficult political circumstances and the instructions he received from Hovhannes-Smbat. Other interpretations suggest that Peter also had his own political position during the Trebizond negotiations. The subsequent deterioration of relations between the Catholicos and the king damaged the country’s political stability. Peter was not merely a religious authority: he crowned kings and conducted royal anointing ceremonies, while also playing an important role as a diplomat and mediator.

In 1021, amid the growing Seljuk Turkish threat, Senekerim of Vaspurakan transferred his kingdom to Byzantium in exchange for Sebasteia and adjacent territories. According to the sources, the ceded lands included eight cities, seventy-two fortresses, and four thousand villages; 115 monasteries remained in the hands of Armenian monks. Senekerim moved to Sebasteia with his family, princes, and troops.

In 1022, in order to prevent a Byzantine invasion of Armenia, Hovhannes-Smbat sent Peter I to Trebizond, where he concluded a treaty with Emperor Basil II. According to the treaty, the Kingdom of Ani would be pass to Byzantium after Hovhannes-Smbat's death.

Before the negotiations, Basil II had entered Trebizond in late 1021 to spend the winter there and was preparing a campaign against the Bagratid kingdom. Through envoys, he had demanded Ani, Kars, and the whole of Shirak. Hovhannes-Smbat feared retaliation because he had provided military assistance to the Georgian king. Peter travelled to Trebizond bearing gifts. His retinue included twelve bishops, seventy monks and priests, and three hundred mounted guards; among those accompanying him were the vardapets Joseph Hn(j)uts and Hovhannes Kozern. Peter arrived in late December 1021, and the meeting with the emperor was scheduled for 6 January 1022. Basil received the Catholicos with great honour.

The treaty caused an outrage in Ani, forcing Peter I to move to Sebasteia, from which he returned to Ani only in 1026.

Historians offer different explanations for Hovhannes-Smbat’s decision to make the testament. Aristakes Lastivertsi attributes it to the king’s lack of an heir, since his only son had died; Vardan Areveltsi connects it with pressure from the Georgian king; and John Skylitzes explains it by Hovhannes-Smbat’s fear of retaliation by Basil II. Hakob Manandyan examined these accounts and considered Skylitzes’s explanation the most reliable. Basil promised Hovhannes-Smbat financial security and an imperial stipend, along with gifts and privileges over a period of fifteen years. The emperor also granted an annual stipend to the Catholicos.

Peter did not return to Ani immediately after the negotiations. In the spring, at the emperor’s instruction, he went to Sebasteia, to the court of Senekerim Artsruni, the last king of Vaspurakan. He returned to Ani after the deaths of Senekerim and Basil II in 1026; by then public anger had subsided and many people no longer remembered the events. The delay in his return points to strained relations between Peter and Hovhannes-Smbat. The treaty had created political contradictions, and the king understood its consequences only too late, while Byzantine diplomacy took advantage of divisions within the royal court and the clergy.

In Trebizond, Peter I celebrated the Feast of the Epiphany in the presence of the Byzantine emperor; in Eastern Christianity, this holiday is accompanied by the blessing of holy water. The Armenian clergymen, led by Peter I, blessed the water at one part of the river, while the Byzantine clergymen stood downstream so that the water blessed by the non-Chalcedonian Armenians could be blessed again. (The 11th–12th centuries were a time of heightened Byzantine–Armenian theological disputes.) A tradition arose in Armenia that the river's course stopped and then reversed after Peter I's blessing, giving rise to his epithet Getadardz ('reversing the course of the river').

The ceremony took place on the Chorokh River. The placement of the Armenian clergy upstream was a diplomatic gesture by the Byzantine emperor, indicating his satisfaction with the Catholicos; the Greek clergy stood downstream in order to bless the water again. According to Maghakia Ormanian, the ecclesiastical rank of the officiants was also significant: the highest-ranking Armenian cleric was the Catholicos, while the Greek representative was the metropolitan.

The medieval accounts of the miracle differ. Aristakes Lastivertsi, a contemporary who was not present at the ceremony, writes that rays of light emerged from the water. Vardan Areveltsi describes a luminous sign issuing from Peter’s right hand and the holy oil. Matthew of Edessa says that fire appeared on the water after Peter poured holy oil and blessed it with the Holy Sign, and that the river stopped flowing for a time. Later chroniclers embellished the story in order to emphasize the strength of the Armenian faith. Aristakes does not use the epithet “Getadardz”; the name was attached to Peter by later writers, while the eighteenth-century chronicler Baghdasar Dpir called him “Petros Getargel.” According to tradition, Peter also brought the True Cross to Trebizond.

After the Trebizond negotiations, relations between Peter and Hovhannes-Smbat became increasingly strained. Peter’s circle of support included pro-Byzantine figures at court, notably Vest Sargis and Grigor Pahlavuni Magistros. According to Leo, the tension arose partly because the king did not grant Peter the powers that he had exercised during the negotiations in Trebizond. At a deeper level, the conflict reflected competition for influence between secular and ecclesiastical authorities.

Peter inherited extensive ancestral estates in Arsharunik. Matthew of Edessa claims that he controlled five hundred villages and seven hundred dioceses; the figure may be exaggerated. Gh. Alishan questioned the scale of the claim, noting that surviving records of church councils contain only about forty to fifty episcopal signatures. The village of Ashnak was among Peter’s properties. Its vineyard was given to Ablgharib Pahlavuni, who in turn donated it to his Church of Surb Prkich in Ani. In 1031 Ablgharib endowed that church with an expensive vineyard, lands, an olive mill, and three kughpaks; he also donated a field at Karnut to the Church of the Apostles. Grigor Magistros owned Bjni and its fortress and donated extensive lands to the church of Bjni and the monastery of Havuts Tar. Mkhitar Ayrivanetsi attributes the construction of the monasteries of Surmari and Tsarakar to Peter in 1011.

The Catholicosate in Ani maintained a large brotherhood and staff: twelve bishops who served as advisers, four vardapets, sixty priests, and five hundred laypeople. Matthew of Edessa writes that the Catholicosate and its churches possessed innumerable treasures. Much of the clergy lived in luxury, supported by income from ecclesiastical estates. Peter was accused of maintaining a courtly, king-like household, and Matthew famously observed that “the patriarchal see was no less than the royal one.” Matthew also describes Bishop Davtuk at the time of the sack of Artsn in 1049: eight hundred oxen reportedly left his household each morning, while forty camels were needed to transport his treasures. The wealth of the Church derived from its estates and dues collected from some eight hundred churches.

Peter I's pro-Byzantine policies brought on a new protests in 1031, and he was forced to move to Dzoravank (a former seat of the Armenian catholicos) in Vaspurakan, which by that time was under Byzantine control. In 1037, Hovhannes-Smbat recalled him and confined him in the fortress of Bjni, selecting Dioscorus, the abbot of Sanahin, as the new catholicos. But one year later Peter's supporters assembled a council of clergymen, princes and azats (lesser nobles), led by Joseph, the Catholicos of Albania (Ałuank). In 1039, the council reconfirmed Peter as Catholicos, after which Dioscorus returned to Sanahin.

Peter was imprisoned at Bjni for one year and five months, while Dioscorus served as Catholicos for one year and two months. Dioscorus’s election had not been made by a church council, and some clerics therefore regarded it as canonically illegitimate. A council convened at the end of 1038 decided to restore Peter, who returned on 6 January 1039. Another study dates Peter’s removal to 1036 and states that Hovhannes-Smbat forcibly deposed him and appointed a new patriarch. In 1038, bishops gathered in Ani demanded Peter’s restoration in opposition to the king’s candidate. This interpretation also argues that the authority of the Catholicosate had become so strong that even Peter’s politically ambiguous conduct could not undermine its position.

A solar eclipse occurred on 10 August 1033, which was regarded as falling on the thousandth anniversary of the Crucifixion. A chronicle describes the event with the words that “the whole earth trembled violently.” Hovhannes-Smbat and Peter interpreted the eclipse as an ominous sign. They sent Grigor Magistros, Vest Sargis, Armenian nobles, and clergy to Sevanavank to consult Hovhannes Kozern. Kozern interpreted the eclipse as divine punishment for departures from Christian commandments and predicted disasters as a consequence of moral decline and the desecration of holy things. He criticized the clergy, especially its leaders, for materialism, and foretold violations of church order and the spread of heresies. His prophecies and criticism of the clergy further damaged Peter’s reputation and made his position in Ani uncomfortable.

In 1041, Hovhannes-Smbat and his brother died. In 1042, Gagik II, Hovhannes-Smbat's nephew, was crowned King of Armenia by Peter I in Ani. At this time, Peter appointed his own nephew, Khachik, as his locum tenens. In 1045, Peter—who was still loyal to the terms of the treaty he signed in Trebizond—and the nobleman Vest Sargis pushed Gagik II to go to Constantinople and present himself to the emperor Constantine IX Monomachos. After Gagik's departure, Peter sent the keys to the city of Ani to the Byzantine emperor. Historian Karen Matevosyan writes: "By conspiring in the destruction of Armenian statehood, Peter I hoped to strengthen his authority as Catholicos under the protection of Byzantium. However, the empire, which intended also to destroy the independence of the Armenian Church, sharply changed its attitude towards Peter I after capturing Ani and began to persecute him."

After Gagik II travelled to Constantinople and was taken captive, the political situation in Ani deteriorated further, and feelings of despair and defeatism spread. Instead of helping to unite patriotic forces and organize a common resistance, Peter’s actions contributed to accelerating the surrender of the city. His conduct remains debated; by adhering to Hovhannes-Smbat’s testament, he in effect helped bring about the end of the Bagratid kingdom.

The Byzantine objectives after the capture of Ani extended beyond the abolition of the Armenian kingdom. The imperial authorities also sought to restrict the independence of the Armenian Church and weaken the political influence of the Catholicosate. The Church consequently became the next target of Byzantine policy, since it remained an important symbol of Armenian autonomy and national unity.

At the end of 1046, Peter I was forced to leave Ani and move to Artze. In April 1047, he and Khachik were arrested and sent to Constantinople, but they were soon released. Convinced that this was not the end of the persecution, he left Khachik as his vicar in Ani and set out for Constantinople. After four years as an "honorary exile" in Constantinople, he was given permission to settle in Sebasteia, where he remained until his death in 1058. He was buried in the courtyard of Surb Nshan Monastery. He was succeeded by his nephew Khachik as Catholicos.

A further study reports that, after Ani was handed over to Byzantium, Peter found refuge around 1047 at the court of Senekerim-Hovhannes Artsruni in Sebasteia. According to Aristakes Lastivertsi, the Byzantines feared that if Peter returned home he might stir up a revolt in Ani. The chronicler records their fear that he might “go and incite Ani to rebellion.” This testimony suggests that the Catholicos, who had earlier been regarded as pro-Byzantine, was no longer considered fully trustworthy by the Empire.

== Literary heritage and personality ==
Seeing the hostile actions of the Byzantines against the Armenian Church after the fall of the Bagratid kingdom, Peter revised his earlier positions. He commissioned Anania of Sanahin to write Ban hakacharutean enddem erkabnakats (Discourse against the dyophysites), a treatise aimed at strengthening the Armenian Church's theological positions against Byzantine encroachments. He also had Anania compose a commentary on the letters of Paul the Apostle, and he had Hovhannes Kozern compose a history of the Bagratid house, which has not survived. Peter himself is credited with writing several sharakans (Armenian chants) for requiems and ceremonies dedicated to martyrs. Particularly famous is his sharakan dedicated to Saint Vardan Mamikonian and his companions, known by its incipit "Ariatsealk ar hakaraksn", which stands out for its melodiousness.

Medieval lists of hymnographers attribute numerous chants in the Orders of the Departed and the Martyrs to Peter. The best known is the Vardanants canon hymn “Ariatsealk ar hakaraksn,” notable for its rich and distinctive melody.

The question of authorship has been the subject of later philological research. Grigor Tatevatsi and the Synaxarion attributed the complete canons of the Martyrs and the Departed to Peter. However, studies by Manuk Abeghyan, N. Akinian, and S. Amatuni showed that some hymns in these canons belong to other authors, including Sarkis Sevantsi, Hakob Sanahnetsi, Nerses Shnorhali, and Khosrovidukht. Of the seventy-five hymns in the canon “Hamoren Nnջecelots,” seventy-two, as well as five “Mankunk,” are attributed to Peter. Abeghyan also rejected the attribution of the Departed canon to Stepanos Syunetsi.

Among the hymns with historical and religious subjects, “Ov hrashali nahahark” is dedicated to the 318 fathers of the Council of Nicaea. It praises the fathers of the council and condemns those who departed from Christian doctrine: Arius is called “impure,” while Macedonius is described as the “root of curses,” “blasphemer Macedonius,” and a “corrupting wolf.”

The hymn “Ltsyeal astvatsayin shnorhiw” is dedicated to David of Dvin, a Persian nobleman named Surhan who converted to Christianity and was baptized by Catholicos Anastas. In 703, on the order of the Arab ostikan, he was crucified in Dvin. The hymn praises his steadfastness in the Christian faith and his martyrdom.

The hymn “Stugut’eamb teghak’eal” is dedicated to the martyrs of Sukias. According to tradition, Sukias and his companions were court nobles under King Artashes II of Armenia. After converting to Christianity through the envoys from Rome known as the Voskian priests, they abandoned court life and withdrew to the Tsaghkants Mountains, to Mount Sukavet. They were later martyred under King Bakur, around 130.

Peter also composed hymns dedicated to Saint Sandukht (“Zpartss aysor surb yekeghetsi”), the Voskian priests, the martyrs of Sukias, and the child Kirakos and his mother Houghita.

His hymns display a variety of artistic devices. In one penitential hymn, he addresses God as the “Wise Physician and Architect,” asking Him to heal the sickness of the soul. He expresses spiritual decline through the words “I was gold, but became worthless.”

The Orders of the Departed and Penance reveal particular poetic skill. In the hymns for the Departed, Peter evokes the Last Judgment through vivid images: the archangel’s trumpet, graves opening, and all creatures trembling before judgment. These images appear, among others, in “Zarhureal doghan araratsk” and “Vor tagavord es tagavorats.”

In hymns intended for funeral rites, Peter uses the distinctive device of allowing the deceased to speak in the first person. The dead person appears to address the living from the threshold of the grave: “I have drawn near to the gates of the tomb, and the time has come for me to enter the womb․․․” Through this device, death and the end of earthly life are presented in an immediate and emotionally powerful way.

Scholars have offered different interpretations of the sorrow and penitential mood in Peter’s hymns. K. Kostanyan, D. Khachkonts, and M. Abeghyan connected these emotions with the Catholicos’s personal life and political activity, interpreting them as possible regret for political mistakes. The author of the study from which this discussion is drawn argues instead that the hymns should be understood within the broader framework of Christian teaching on sin, repentance, and salvation, and compared with the penitential canons of Mesrop Mashtots.

Peter I regularly corresponded with the prince and scholar Grigor Magistros, whose Hellenophile interests he shared. The Catholicos's letters reveal him to be one of the most learned and cultured men of his time. However, medieval Armenian historians wrote of his love for money and power, for which he was criticized during his lifetime.

Peter’s successor Khachik II was his sister’s son, whom Peter himself appointed and consecrated. Through Khachik, Peter was able to continue exercising influence over the Armenian Church.

The historical assessment of Peter Getadardz remains complex and controversial. His career combined considerable learning, ecclesiastical authority, and political influence with a pro-Byzantine orientation. His participation in the Trebizond treaty and his role in the surrender of Ani had grave consequences for Armenian statehood. Later events also showed that Byzantium used his political course and ultimately curtailed his own authority. These contradictions make Peter one of the most controversial figures in medieval Armenian history.

Preceded by Sarkis I of Armenia, Sarkis I of Sevan	Catholicos of the Holy See of St. Echmiadzin and All Armenians; 1019–1058	Succeeded by Khachik II of Ani, Seat transferred to Sebastia then to Tavblur
