= Abraham I of Armenia =

Catholicos of the Armenian Church

Catholicos Abraham I (Աբրահամ Ա Աղբաթանեցի) was the Catholicos-Patriarch of the Armenian Apostolic Church between 607 and 615. His tenure was dominated by a schism between the Armenian and Georgian churches.

== Background ==
Abraham came from the village of Ałbateank in the district of Rshtunik by the southern shore of Lake Van As was common at the time, the Sasanian overlords were involved in the selection of the Catholicos. At the time, the throne was vacant and an interregnum of Verthanes Qerthol was in operation. In 607 the local ruler (marzban) Smbat IV Bagratuni who governed Armenia on behalf of Emperor Khosrow II selected Abraham. Ukhantes states that Kyrion, the pontiff of the Armenians was not in attendance.

== The Chalcedonian Disputes ==
=== Georgian Schism ===
Abraham inherited the problem of the separation between the Georgian church (also called Iberian) which had started during Moses II reign, and in spite of many letters and councils it was never resolved. Kurion, the Catholicos of the Georgians had studied the documents of the Council of Chalcedon and the Tome of Leo, and the Georgians had become Chalcedonianist.

Abraham spent much of his reign trying to persuade the churches in Georgia (which was called Iberia at the time) to abandon Chalcedonianism and return to the Armenian Miaphysite orthodoxy. The Georgians had previously aligned with the Byzantine Emperor Maurice under their pontiff Kyrion I for political reasons. Kyrion had written to Abraham claiming that the Armenians were "at variance with all other churches of Christ". Abraham rejected the plea, called his bishops to Dvin and excommunicated the Georgians, calling them heretics. Abraham extended to the Georgians the interdictions previously laid against the Greeks: No Armenian was to communicate with them, to eat with them, to pray with them, or to marry them.

This dispute led to a permanent schism which exists until this day.

=== Avan Schism ===
Around 609 the Byzantines called another council at Constantinople to try and settle the long-running dispute between the Byzantines and the Armenians. Abraham sent just two monks as proxies. 19 pro-Greek Armenian bishops attended and they ended up agreeing to the Chalcedonian position. Abraham's proxies dissented and went back to Dvin. The Byzantines liberated the bishops who had attended the council from Abraham's authority and set up a rival Patriarch (an anti-Catholicos) at Avan in their sector, John of Bagaran. This added religious schism to the political divisions, and embittered both parties

The Bishops in the area that had been taken over by the Byzantines, and were in the area controlled by John petitioned Abraham to issue a Statement of Faith confirming opposition to the Chalcedonian doctrine and vowed to abstain completely from communicating with the "heretics".

The anti-Catholicos John enjoyed local support for several years but his support eventually leaked away. As early as 607 there is documentation of the defection of five bishops from the border region of Western Armenia where the Byzantines were strongest. Also the head of the cathedral at Vagharshapat (Etchmiadzin) the historical heart of the Armenian Church, returned to the fold.

This caused great trouble for the naxarars who were hoping to rise in the Imperial administration, as an oath of orthodoxy (to Chalcedonism) was a prerequisite. A few years later, the Persian King Khosrow II sent a deputy, Ashot Bargtuni who conquered the Byzantine puppet state with a major victory at Theodosiopolis the city where the council had been held decades earlier, modern Erzurum. Ashot captured the usurper John, effectively ending the schism.

== Relics ==
A series of sacred vessels which had been kept by Abraham at Dvin were sent to Karin(Theodosiopolis) under the pre-text of safekeeping, since Dvin was a war zone at the time. The pro-Byzantine faction in Karin gave the vessels to John to legitimatise his patriarchy. So when they were returned to Abraham by the Persians after they captured Karin, it re-legitimatised Abraham's position at Dvin.

Abraham also blessed and distributed the Holy Oil, which had remained unblessed since the death of Moses II.

Preceded by Moses II‡	Catholicos of the Holy See of St. Echmiadzin and All Armenians; 607–615	Succeeded by Komitas I

‡ Interregnum 604–607, administered by Verthanes Qerthol the Grammarian
