= Verthanes Qerthol =

6th–7th century Armenian chronicler and theologian

Vrtanes Kertogh (Վրթանես Քերթող, also known as The Grammarian, active late-6th century to early 7th century), was an Armenian chronicler, grammarian, and theologian. He served as the locum tenens (acting leader) of the Armenian Church from 604 to 607 following the death of Catholicos Movses II. He is best known as the author of the book Yaghags Patkeramartits ("On the Iconoclasts")

== Biography ==
According to the 10th-century historian Ukhtanes, Vrtanes was educated at the school of the Catholicosate of Dvin. His writing style earned him the surname Kertogh (a title traditionally given to accomplished grammarians, rhetoricians, or poets).

In 589, Vrtanes traveled to Constantinople alongside a doctor of the church (vardapet) named Grigor. The two served as official emissaries representing Catholicos Movses II at a church council convened in the Byzantine capital. They were to defend the anti-Chalcedonian position of the Armenian church which had been agreed decades earlier at the Second Council of Dvin. This led to Emperor Maurice declaring Movses illegitimate in his empire, and set up the anti-Catholicos John of Bagaran instead.

When Movses died in 604, the Armenian Church was in chaos because the Byzantine–Sasanian War of 602–628 was starting and the Sasanian (Persian) EmperorKhosrow II had invaded Armenia and had captured Dvin. In addition John of Bagaran supported by the Byzantines had a rival Catholicosate in nearby Avan. So Vrtanes was elected as a special war-time locum tenens (interim administrator) of the patriarchate, making a rare interregnum for the Dvin Catholicosal throne. He governed the church during a three-year interregnum until 607 when the war had moved on. Abraham I was elected, by a full quorum of surviving Armenian bishops.

During his administration, the historic ecclesiastical schism between the Armenian and Georgian churches began, largely driven by the Georgian Church's alignment with the Council of Chalcedon under Kurion.

Vrtanes was a contemporary to the early developments of the site of Saint Hripsime Church in Echmiadzin, and he wrote a brief historical account of the history of the site.

=== Third Council of Dvin ===
In 607 Vrtanes called the Third Council of Dvin to confirm the orthodoxy of his bishops, this was a pre-requisite before choosing the next catholicos. It specifically gave him the authority to receive bishops who had adopted the Byzantine Chalcedonian beliefs and wished to return. The new Catholicos, Abraham I was elected either at this council or shortly after, in the same year.

== Works and theological impact ==
=== Correspondence ===
During his time, Vrtanes had to deal with the head of the Georgian Orthodox Church, Catholicos Kurion I (Kyrion), an Armenian who had shifted the Georgians to the Byzatine sphere of influence by embracing the Chalcedonian doctrine. At the border town of Tsurtav Kyrion was pressuring Bishop Moses to secede, so Moses fled and the correspondence between the two of them gives a good record of the political and doctrinal challenges that Vrtanes had to navigate. In this correspondence Vrtanes refers to John of Bagaran as the "so-called Catholicos", but tries to maintain good relations with Kurion, and tries to warn him off the overtures that the Chalcedonians were making.

A significant number of his own letters, encyclicals, and doctrinal messages are preserved within Ukhtanes's History of Armenia.

=== On the Iconoclasts ===
His primary surviving work is the treatise Yaghags Patkeramartits ("On the Iconoclasts", alternatively titled "Against the Adversaries" or "On the Opponents" in some manuscripts). Sirarpie Der Nersessian states that if this text was truly written by Vrtanes then this text is the earliest surviving dedicated writing against iconoclasm.

The work is directed against an Iconoclastic Armenian sect who opposed the use of images in churches; he defended the practices of the Armenian Church by citing the figures adorning the interior of the Armenian churches: the Holy Virgin with the Child and other Saints. In addition, Vrtanes mentioned scenes inspired by the life and miracles of Jesus: “all the wonders of Christ that are related in Scriptures we see painted in the churches of God, the Nativity, Baptism, Passion and Crucifixion, the Burial, Resurrection and Ascension.”

== See also ==
- Moses II of Armenia
- Abraham I of Armenia

== Bibliography ==
- Kurkjian, Vahan M. (2008). A History of Armenia. Indo-European Publishing. pp. 354, 439. ISBN 978-1-60444-012-6.
- Der Nersessian, Sirarpie (1944). "Une apologie des images du septième siècle". Byzantion (in French). 17. Peeters Publishers: 58–87.
- Der Nersessian, Sirarpie (1946). "Image Worship in Armenia and Its Opponents". Armenian Quarterly. 1 (1): 67–81.
- Kertogh, Vrtanes (1927). Durian, Eghishe (ed.). Yaghags Patkeramartits (Against the Iconoclasts). Sion. Jerusalem: Armenian Patriarchate.
