= Council of Manzikert =

The Council of Manzikert (or Manazkert) met in 726 to reconcile the Armenian Apostolic and Syriac Orthodox churches. It was convoked by the Armenian catholicos John of Odzun and attended by 23 bishops and eight vardapets (theological scholars) of the Armenian church and six bishops of the Syriac church sent by Patriarch Athanasius III of Antioch. It took place in Manzikert (Manazkert). The Caucasian Albanians, were also Chalcedonian like the Syriacs, but they had been effectively banished from Armenian by the actions of the previous catholicos, Elias I in 705, and so were not invited.

== The Nature of Christ ==
Both the Armenian church and the Syriac were miaphysite (Christ is fully human and fully divine and the two cannot be separated) and rejected the Council of Chalcedon (451), which stated that Christ is one person with two distinct natures. Patriarch Athanasius and Catholicos John signed an agreement on their condemnation of the Chalcedon formulation. In the canons of the council, the Armenians anathematized both the Aphthartodocetists (who believed that Jesus' body was incorruptible) and some of the more heretical followers of Severus of Antioch (who was himself nonetheless accepted) in favour of the moderate formulation of Cyril of Alexandria.

The council formally withdrew the Armenian church from communion with the Greek Orthodox church. It affirmed that Christ was true God, only-begotten Son, a single hypostasis and a single nature of the incarnate Word. While his human body was capable of pain and suffering, "of his divine nature he was above suffering". This formulation was arguably consistent with Chalcedon (if taken in light of the Second Council of Constantinople). This Council also led to the canonization and re-acceptance of Severus of Antioch for the Armenians.

The council also addressed the rise of the Paulicians, completing the work done in the Fifth Council of Dvin.

The Syriac church, which disagreed with many distinctive Armenian customs, was not entirely pleased with the outcome at Manzikert, but accepted communion with the Armenians nonetheless. The canons of Manzikert are often credited with confirming the Armenian church in its distinctive non-Chalcedonian theology and setting it apart from other churches. After the council, Armenian Chalcedonism was suppressed.

== Other Issues Discussed ==
As it the Fifth Council of Dvin the Armenians wanted to keep January 6th as the date of the Nativity and the Epiphany, to show their rejection of the Greek custom, and by keeping the two together it emphasised Christ's miaphysite nature.

The council rejected the Greek custom which used leavened bread and wine mixed with water, whereas the Armenians used unleavened bread and unmixed wine. The mixing of bread with yeast, or water with wine was felt to be in contradiction to Christ's unchanging nature.

Armenians had been moving to Syria and were adopting the Chalcedonic doctrine so John sent three bishops to bring them back to orthodoxy. Athanasius agreed to fund a monastery for the bishops, and it was a place of learning for both Syriac and Armenian traditions.
