= Council of Partav =

The Council of Partav was a church synod held in about 703 in Caucasian Albania. The Council condemned the Georgian Church's adherence to the decision of the Council of Chalcedon. and was an important step in the schism between the Armenian Church and the Byzantine and Georgian Churches.

== Background ==
The Council of Chalcedon had been ratified by the Catholic, Eastern Orthodox and Syrian Antioch churches. The Armenian Apostolic Church being Miaphysite had, however, rejected the theological decisions of the Council of Chalcedon when the Armenian Crown called the Second Council of Dvin. This created a schism between Armenia and the Churches of Rome, Byzantium and Antioch, with the Georgian Church supporting their Armenian neighbours.

New leadership in Georgia saw that province ratify the Council of Chalcedon, and side with the main Churches of Rome and Byzantium. The Council of Partav was called to condemn this change in position, and unsurprisingly was passed by the Armenian bishops.
