= Third Council of Dvin =

Church council

- Date: 607 or 609–610
- Accepted by: Armenian Apostolic Church
- Previous council: Second Council of Dvin
- Next council: Fourth Council of Dvin
- Location: Dvin

The Third Council of Dvin was a church council held in 607 (or 609–610) in the city of Dvin (then in Sasanian Armenia). It was called by Verthanes Qerthol who served in the interregnum between Movses II and Abraham I.

== Overview ==
This council (or synod) was the culmination of a series of post-Chalcedon debates on the nature(s) of Christ. The schism within the Armenian Church which had erupted as a result of the second Chalcedonian Catholicosate in Armenia (591-610), was mended, and the conclusions of the Council of Chalcedon of 451 were explicitly condemned.

The Armenian Orthodox Church concluded that both “monophysitism” and the Chalcedonian Definition were to be condemned. Instead the church decided to follow the doctrine of Cyril of Alexandria, who described Christ as being of one incarnate nature, with both divine and human nature being united.

The synod saw the election of an Armenian, Abraham I of Armenia, as Catholicos. Abraham condemned the Council of Chalcedon in accordance with the decision of the Second Council of Dvin.

== Split with the Georgian Church ==
By the end of the council, the Armenians were fully opposed to the Christological definition given by the Chalcedonian Church. The Georgian Orthodox Church decided to join with Constantinople in upholding the Chalcedonian definition of the dual nature of Christ. This Council established the formal split between the Armenian and Georgian Churches.

Although a rift was established with the Georgian church, the Council led to mending of an internal rift within the Armenian Church itself.

A Fourth Council of Dvin was held in 648 to discuss possible reunification with the Georgian church, but this idea was later rejected.

== Other elements ==
The council also established seven canon laws regarding the orthodoxy of bishops. In particular, the laws dealt with the bishops who had deviated from the faith.

== See also ==
- First Council of Dvin (506)
- Second Council of Dvin (554)
- Fourth Council of Dvin (648)
- Fifth Council of Dvin (720)
