= Battle of Doghs =

- Part of Arab Invasions of Armenia
Date	894
Location	Dōghs, Aragatsotn, Greater Armenia
Result	A Brilliant Armenian Victory

Belligerents
Bagratid Armenia Principality of Syunik	Arab Caliphate Sajid Emirate

Commanders and leaders
Smbat I the Martyr Grigor Supan	Yusuf, the Emir

Battle of Doghs (Armenian: Դողսի ճակատամարտ) was a military clash that took place during the Arab invasions of Armenia between Smbat I, the Bagratid king of Armenia, and the forces of Yusuf, the emir of the Sajid emirate of Atropatene. It took place in 894 in the vicinity of the village of Doghs, in the Aragatsotn district of Greater Armenia.

The motive behind the battle was King Smbat’s efforts to consolidate his authority, which directly conflicted with the expansionist ambitions of the Arab Caliphate and the Sajid Emirate.

According to Hovhannes the Historian of Draskhanakert, Ashot’s growing influence, the expansion of his authority over the northern peoples, and his friendly relations with Emperor Leo VI of Byzantium also contributed to Afshin’s discontent. The historian notes that Afshin feared Smbat might sever the ties of submission and the obligations to pay tribute that connected him to the emir.

== Background ==
Under the conditions created by the Arab invasions of Armenia, in 885 Ashot Bagratuni, the ishkhanats ishkhan (Prince of Princes) of Armenia, proclaimed himself king of Armenia, thereby establishing the hereditary rule of the Bagratid dynasty in the Kingdom of Greater Armenia. Ashot I’s coronation took place in the fortified town of Bagaran, with the blessing of Catholicos George II of Garnik. During his reign, Bagratid authority was consolidated, and the king also undertook military campaigns in the northern regions.

In 890, Ashot was succeeded by his son Smbat, who likewise adopted his predecessor’s policy of establishing a unified state.

One of the problems that arose at the beginning of Smbat I’s reign was a succession dispute with his uncle, Abas. Abas was eventually forced to yield and recognize his nephew Smbat as king of Armenia. This circumstance demonstrated that the new monarch had to consolidate his authority within the country while also confronting external threats․

The newly enthroned king first strengthened his position and, in an effort to counter the threat posed by the Arab Caliphate, concluded an alliance with Emperor Leo VI the Wise of Byzantium in 893. Smbat had sent a diplomatic mission to Constantinople bearing valuable gifts. As a result, Armenian-Byzantine relations were strengthened, and a trade agreement was concluded. The Byzantine emperor, in turn, sent gifts to the Armenian king.

Hovhannes the Historian of Draskhanakert emphasizes the friendly nature of the relationship between Smbat I and Leo VI. According to the historian, the emperor regarded Smbat as his beloved son. This rapprochement concerned Afshin, who suspected that the ties established between the Armenian king and Byzantium might be directed against him.

Another important event during the early years of Smbat I’s reign was the struggle for Dvin. According to the first text, between 890 and 892 the king besieged Dvin, one of Armenia’s major cities, which was under the control of an Arab emirate. Following the capture of Dvin, Afshin invaded Armenia once again. Negotiations between Smbat I and Afshin proved unsuccessful, and Catholicos George, who had participated in the negotiations, was arrested.

Another significant step in Smbat I’s foreign policy was the conclusion of a trade agreement with Byzantium. Afshin, the ruler of Atropatene, regarded this development as a threat to his influence and sought to prevent the further strengthening of the Armenian kingdom.

One of the challenges facing Armenia during this period was the increasingly powerful Sajid Emirate of Atropatene, whose rulers were appointed by the Abbasid dynasty. The Abbasids had sought to conquer the Kingdom of Greater Armenia since the reign of Ashot Bagratuni.

The rapprochement between Armenia and Byzantium alarmed the Sajid emirs of Atropatene. Smbat’s independent foreign policy and his strengthening of ties with the imperial court could limit the Caliphate’s influence in Armenia. Under these circumstances, Afshin, the Sajid emir, sought to prevent the further strengthening of the Bagratid kingdom through military pressure.

According to Hovhannes the Historian of Draskhanakert, Afshin assembled a large army and advanced toward Armenia. Having learned of his intentions, Smbat I likewise organized a military mobilization, sending orders to various parts of the country. The historian notes that Armenian princes gathered around the king with substantial forces. Smbat marched with his army to confront the enemy, advancing as far as the district of Rotak, near Atropatene.

Before the first confrontation, Smbat I had concentrated a large army along the frontier. The first text gives the strength of the Armenian army as 30,000 soldiers. Faced with the strength of the Armenian forces, Afshin backed down, and the two sides exchanged gifts before withdrawing from one another. This episode demonstrates that, during the initial phase of the conflict, Smbat I was able to deter the ruler of Atropatene by displaying his military strength.

== The Battle and Its Aftermath ==
Some time after the conclusion of an anti-Arab agreement with Byzantium, in 894 the army of the Sajid Emirate invaded the southern borders of the Bagratid Kingdom of Greater Armenia, ravaging the surrounding territories. The Armenians marched out to meet the enemy, and the two armies clashed in the Aragatsotn district, at the settlement of Doghs. In this battle, the Sajid forces led by Emir Yusuf, together with the mixed contingents supporting the Caliphate, suffered a crushing defeat and were forced to retreat to Atropatene.

According to Hovhannes the Historian of Draskhanakert, Afshin reached Nakhichevan and then advanced toward Dvin. Having learned of his advance, Smbat I attempted to assemble his troops once again, but this time he was unable to move against the enemy as promptly as before. The king selected defensible positions and sent royal decrees to various regions, summoning the Armenian princes to mobilize their forces.

During the campaign, Smbat I attempted to organize the country’s defense by declaring a military mobilization and concentrating the forces of the nobility along the probable routes of the enemy’s advance. According to Hovhannes the Historian of Draskhanakert, the king sent decrees to different regions, and the Armenian princes gathered around him with a large army.

The historian also reports that the troops responding to the king’s call from the northern regions included skilled archers and spearmen. They were armed and combat-ready and assembled at the foot of Mount Aragats, near the village of Vzhan. This account indicates that Smbat I sought to organize not only the principal forces of the Armenian nobility but also armed detachments arriving from various regions of the country.

Unsuccessful attempts at negotiation also played an important role during the enemy’s advance. Smbat had sent Catholicos George to Afshin to conduct peace negotiations. However, the emir demanded to meet the king in person and eventually ordered the catholicos to be arrested and placed in chains. This action intensified the conflict and strengthened the determination to resist the Arab army.

According to Hovhannes the Historian of Draskhanakert, Catholicos George had hoped to soften Afshin’s attitude and establish peace. Afshin initially received him courteously but subsequently attempted to use the catholicos to persuade Smbat I to come to him in person. When the king refused to appear, the catholicos returned to Afshin, who then ordered him to be chained and held in iron shackles. Thus, the negotiations failed to bring about peace, and the arrest of the catholicos became one of the significant episodes of the campaign.

According to Hovhannes the Historian of Draskhanakert, Afshin’s army encamped near the village of Doghs. Three days later, the emir arranged his troops in battle formation and advanced against Smbat I’s army. During the battle, the Armenian forces inflicted heavy blows on the enemy. The Armenian historian mentions the actions of swordsmen and archers, the heavy losses suffered by the opposing ranks, and the ensuing retreat. Unable to overcome Armenian resistance, Afshin’s army was forced to withdraw.

In Hovhannes the Historian of Draskhanakert’s account, the course of the battle is described as follows: after remaining near Doghs for three days, Afshin drew up his troops in battle formation and advanced against Smbat I. The attacks of the Armenian swordsmen and longbow archers inflicted heavy losses on the Ismaelite army. According to the historian, enemy soldiers were killed or scattered, while the survivors fled. Afshin’s forces could barely defend the section of their camp where his caravan was located. Thus, the historian emphasizes not only the Armenian army’s victory but also the panic that broke out within the enemy ranks and their disorderly retreat.

Following his defeat, Afshin, according to John the Historian of Draskhanakert, changed his approach. Instead of issuing threats, he began making requests for peace in an attempt to preserve his relationship with Smbat I. He demanded that the king pay the tribute owed to him and swear an oath confirming that he would not break their alliance. This indicates that the defeat at the Battle of Dōghs had compelled Afshin temporarily to abandon overt military pressure and return to negotiations.

Afshin was forced to make peace and release Catholicos George. He also collected the royal taxes and left Armenia. Thus, the military confrontation ended in an Armenian victory, although it did not eliminate the political and fiscal ambitions of the emirate of Atropatene toward Armenia.

Unable to bring the Armenians to their knees through armed struggle, the enemy attempted to subdue the Armenian king by exploiting internal divisions. Not long after the Battle of Doghs, a dispute arose between the Syunids and the Artsrunids over ownership of the city of Nakhichevan. By the decision of King Smbat, Nakhichevan became a hereditary possession of the Syunid family. Dissatisfied with the king’s ruling, Prince Gagik Artsruni asked Smbat to annul the decision, arguing that Nakhichevan had traditionally belonged to the Artsrunids. However, the king remained steadfast in his decision.

One of the principal historical sources on the Battle of Doghs is The History of Armenia by John the Historian of Draskhanakert, which describes Afshin’s campaign, Smbat I’s military mobilization, the arrest of the catholicos, and the battle near Doghs.

According to Hovhannes the Historian of Draskhanakert, after keeping Catholicos George imprisoned for approximately two months, Afshin demanded gold and silver in exchange for his release. The catholicos appealed to the Armenian princes and nobles, and, at Smbat I’s command, assistance was sought from Hamam, the great prince of the eastern regions. Afshin added money of his own to the amount collected and sent it toward securing the catholicos’s release. This episode further illustrates the situation following the battle, demonstrating that even after his military defeat, Afshin continue d to exert political and financial pressure on the Armenian king and the ecclesiastical authorities.

== See also ==
- Arab invasion of Armenia
- Battle of Sevan
