= Sahak III =

Sahak III may also refer to Sahak III Bagratuni.

Sahak III, was the Catholicos of Armenia from 677 through 703.

He served as bishop in Rot-Parsean in Utik before his ordination as Catholicos. His focus was on improving relations with the Church of Albania. During his reign Justinian II re-conquered Armenia in 688/9. As a result of this he was forced to visit the emperor in Constantinople and sign a treaty of union.

According to the historian Hovhannes Draskhanakerttsi Sahak III was alive in Damascus, where he had gone to discuss peace instead of making war, while a Muslim warrior Okbay was moving with his army through the area of Vanand when the people there massacred them. Okbay returned to the Caliph to raise a large army against Armenia and destroy its churches and kill the population. Sahak asked to be allowed to go to Okbay to dissuade him from doing so, but fell ill when he arrived in Harran. He wrote a letter imploring Okbay to not carry out his plan. Before he died he asked to have the letter placed in his palm, so that when Okbay came to receive it he would be taking it from his dead hand and perhaps reconsider. It is said that when Okbay arrived Sahak's hand moved to extend the letter to Okbay, who was impressed and carried out Sahak's wishes and sent Sahak's body back to Armenia with a letter to its princes pardoning them. Armenia was saved through Sahak's death and he was greatly honored.

Preceded by Israel I of Armenia	Catholicos of the Holy See of St. Echmiadzin and All Armenians; 677–703	Succeeded by Elias I of Armenia
