= Christian era (disambiguation) =

Christian era may refer to

- the time since Christianisation in any given regional context.
  - Early Christianity
  - decline of Greco-Roman paganism
  - Ancient Roman Christianity
  - Christianization of the Germanic peoples
  - Christianization of the Slavs
- in Christian eschatology, the age of the Church, between the age of Law and the Millennial age, see Dispensation (period)
- calendar eras: Calendar era#Christian era
  - the Dionysian era or Common Era used in Western Christianity
  - Etos Kosmou (Greek Orthodoxy)
  - Era of the Martyrs (Diocletian era)
  - Incarnation Era, see Ethiopian calendar
  - Armenian calendar era (AD 552, year of the Second Council of Dvin)

== See also ==
- Post-Christian era
- Ages of Man
- Patriarchal age
- Second Temple Judaism
- Rabbinic era
- Christian eschatology
