= Moses II of Armenia =

Catholicos of the Armenian Church

Moses II (Մովսես Բ. Եղիվարդեցի, also known as Movses) was the Catholicos-Patriarch of the Armenian Apostolic Church between 576 and 604. During his reign he had to deal with multiple challenges to his authority and theology, from the Byzantines, the Georgians and even his own bishops.

Moses came from Eghvard in the Aragatsotn district of the province of Ayrarat. After the death of John II in 576, he became Catholicos.

== Byzantine-Armenian Schism ==
In 571 Armenia was the border state between the Byzantines and Sassanian Persia. The Byzantine Emperor Maurice negotiated with Emperor Khorsow II to divide it into two occupation zones delimited by the Azat and Hrazdan rivers. As part of the deal Maurice ordered that his sphere of influence should adopt the Chalcedonian doctrine and invited Moses and his bishops to a synod in Constantinople. Moses maintained the Armenian anti-Chalcedonian (mitaphysite) doctrine and from his seat at Dvin, in the Persian zone pronounced

"I shall not cross the Azat to eat oven-baked bread and drink warm water"

This showed the contempt for the Greek use of leavened bread and diluted wine for the communion, which his church rejected because it implied Christ's separate earthly nature, one of the pillars of Chalcedonianism. The two occupation zones, (now modern Armenia and Georgia) went their own ways on manners of theology but they were both "forced into the same strait-jacket of political subjection" to their respective invaders, according to historian Ronald Grigor Suny.

In retaliation Maurice appointed John of Bagaran as an alternative "Anti-Catholicos" and set him up in the city of Avan, only 40km from Dvin. This causined a schism in the Armenian Church which lasted beyond Moses death in 604. In 611, John was deported to Persia by Khorsow II and the rival line was eliminated.

When Moses died in 604, the Armenian Church was in chaos because the Byzantine–Sasanian War of 602–628 had started and the Sasanian (Persian) Emperor Khosrow II had invaded Armenia and had captured Dvin. So Verthanes Qerthol "The Grammarian" was elected as a special war-time locum tenens (interim administrator) of the patriarchate, making a rare interregnum for the Dvin Catholicosal throne.

== Syunik's breakaway ==
While Armenia was split, the bishops of Syunik refused to recognize the authority of Moses, or of the rival anti-Catholicos John. Ukhantes records that they aligned themselves with the neighbouring Albanian church. The Albanian catholicos provided holy oil (myron) and performed the ordinations of their clergy. The Albanians were doctrinally similar to the Armenians so this seems to have been a dispute about Moses authority rather than a theological schism.

== The Georgian (Iberian) Schism ==
The separation between the Georgian church (also called Iberian) started during Moses reign, in spite of many letters and councils it was never resolved and the Georgians split away permanently in Abraham I's reign, who followed Moses as Catholicos after a brief interregnum from Verthanes Qerthol.

According to Chamich, when the Georgian Catholicos died, they couldn't agree on a successor so asked Moses to intervene. Moses selected Kurion, one of his bishops who was well-respected and he became the Catholicos of the Georgians. He then got hold of the documents of the Council of Chalcedon and the Tome of Leo and the Georgians eventually became Chalcedonians, creating a permanent schism which exists until this day.

== Liturgical Calendar Adoption ==
The new Armenian calendar had been first introduced in year 551 CE when Nerses II was Catholicos.

Moses’ sponsored a new liturgical calendar for the Armenian church which included the critical determination of Easter. He convened another council in Dvin in 584, in which Athanas of Taron, the abbot of St. Karapet’s monastery of Glak, took part as an expert in the history of the church calendar. The council adopted the system of Easter calculations formulated in Alexandria.

Preceded by John II	Catholicos of the Holy See of St. Echmiadzin and All Armenians; 574–604	Succeeded by Abraham I‡
