= Solomon I =

Salomon I or Solomon I may refer to:

- Solomon I (bishop of Constance) (died 871)
- Yagbe'u Seyon, emperor of Ethiopia from 1285 to 1294, took the throne name Salomon
- Solomon I of Imereti, king of Imereti from 1752 to 1765 and again from 1767 until 1784
- Solomon I (Armenian catholicos), 56th Catholicos of Armenia from 791 to 792 AD

== See also ==
- Solomon, Biblical king
