= Sahak I =

Sahak I (Armenian: Սահակ Ա. Մանազկերտցի) was a catholicos of the Armenian Apostolic Church and the first of several catholicoi during the Albaniosid Dynasty in fourth century.

According to Faustus of Byzantium, a popular assembly selected Sahak I as the successor of Pharen I of Armenia after Pharen's death. Awags of the prince of Gardmanac'jor and ten other nakharars accompanied Sahak I to Caesarea in Cappadocia. There bishops ordained Sahak I as catholicos of Greater Armenia. Sahak I followed Pharen's work, but the king Tiran, the naxarars and the princes did not take his advice. During the reign of Arshak II, Saint Nerses I the Great replaced Sahak I.

However, according to the History of the Armenians of Movses Khorenatsi, Sahak I succeeded Saint Nerses I the Great and reigned from 373 to 377 AD. He was appointed by Pap without the permission of Caesarea's bishop council and succeeded by Zawen I.

== Notes ==
Preceded by Saint Nerses I the Great	Catholicos of the Holy See of St. Echmiadzin and All Armenians; 373–377	Succeeded by Zaven I
