= Ashtishat =

Locality and archaeological site in Muş Province, Turkey

- Location within Turkey
- 38°58′20″N 41°27′04″E
- Location: Yücetepe, Muş Province, Turkey

Ashtishat (Armenian: Աշտիշատ, romanized: Aštišat) is a locality and archaeological site in Muş Province of eastern Turkey. It is located near the village of Yücetepe on the Murat River west of Lake Van and north of the city of Muş.

In antiquity the village was an important site of early Armenian Christianity. The ruins of several ancient churches and the monastery of Saint Daniel of Gop still occupy the town. The site also hosts the tombs of several early saints and patriotic leaders of the ancient Armenian kingdom.

== History ==
According to Armenian tradition, Ashtishat was the site of a Hellenistic temple. In the 4th century, Saint Gregory the Illuminator founded a church here. In 364, Gregory's great-grandson Nerses, convened the Council of Ashtishat which established cannon, liturgy, fast days and procedures for classical Armenian Christianity.

Nerses' son, Sahak, founded a monastery in Ashtishat.

Ashtishat was destroyed during the Arab invasion and again by Tamerlane.

== See also ==
- -shat (suffix)
