= Vrats dasht =

Vrats dasht (Armenian: Վրաց դաշտ) is a term used by Armenian chroniclers to refer to lands of modern Northern Armenia and Southern Georgia. The region also used to go by the name of Gugark (Armenian: Գուգարք). According to the Armenian historian Ukhtanes of Sebastia, the town of Tsurtav is located in the region of "vrac' dasht" (Iberian Plain). Tsurtav is one of the main towns of the Gugark province.

== Meaning ==
The sentence "Vrats dasht" roughly translates into "Field of Georgians".

== Early history ==
The first record of the region is associated with the king of Urartu, Argishti I in 785 BC, who records the region as part of the early Proto-Georgian tribal formation of Diauehi. He calls this specific area "Zabaha", which is the Urartean name for "Javakh".

It is also notable that, in the exact same year in 785 BC, after the region switched hands from Diauehian rule into Urartian one, the Erebuni Fortress was founded (which later would become Yerevan, capital of Armenia).

The region roughly came into the rule of Armenia in 189 BC, when Armenian king Artaxias I conquered it. And the domains of Artaxias, at first limited to the Araxes valley, were greatly enlarged at the expense of Iberia. But, in 35 AD, Pharsmanes I of Iberia reconquered this land.
