= Stephen I of Armenia =

Stephen of Armenia may refer to:

- Stephen of Armenia (c. 1111–1165), military commander and marshal of Armenian Cilicia, son of Leo I, Prince of Armenia
- Catholicos Stephen I of Armenia (Stephen I of Dvin / Stepanos I Dvnetsi), Catholicos of the Armenian Apostolic Church (788–790)
