= Nerses II of Armenia =

Catholicos of the Armenian Church

Nerses II ( Ներսես Բ Բագրևվանդցի) was the Catholicos-Patriarch of the Armenian Apostolic Church between 548 and 557.

He was born in Ashtarak in Bagrevand, and convened the Second Council of Dvin in 555. At the synod he proclaimed the Miaphysite doctrines of St Cyril, in opposition to the Chalcedonian claims.

Older historians associate the Second Council of Dvin in 555 as the decisive break with Chalcedonism but modern scholars dispute this, saying that the separation was a gradual process.

Nerses was Catholicos when the new Armenian Calendar was developed, and Year 1 of the new calendar was defined to be year 551 CE, in the middle of his pontificate. The Liturgical calendar, including the dating of Easter was adopted much later, in 584 by Moses II.

The building of the Tsiranavor Basilica at Ashtarak is attributed to him.

He died in 557.

Preceded by Ghevond I	Catholicos of the Holy See of St. Echmiadzin and All Armenians; 548–557	Succeeded by John II
