= Council of Ashtishat =

The Council of Ashtishat (Armenian: Աշտիշատի ժողով), called by Saint Nerses, catholicos of the Armenian church in 354 or 356 AD, was the first ever council of bishops in Armenia. It was held in Ashtishat, the first location of the mother church of Armenia.

The council involved both bishops and senior members of the nobility. It drafted canons and rules for church administration and strengthened the church's political and economic position. To some degree, it lightened the tax burden on the population. It was decided to establish schools in all of the districts of Armenia to further root Christianity in the country. These schools would teach in Greek and Syriac, the main languages of education in Armenia in the fourth century. The teaching of Persian was prohibited and Zoroastrian schools and fire temples were closed. The council banned pre-Christian practices such as consanguineous marriage, excessive (from a Christian point of view) mourning of the dead. It provided for the opening of orphanages, poorhouses and hospitals, which would be funded by special taxes collected from towns and farms.

Another council were held at Ashtishat in 431 under Catholicos Isaac to officially accept the decisions of the Council of Ephesus and address the problem of Nestorianism, which had been condemned at the Council of Ephesus and was spreading in Armenia at the time.
