= Israel I of Armenia =

Catholicos of Armenia

Catholicos Israel I (Իսրայել Ա Ոթմսեցի) was the Catholicos-Patriarch of the Armenian Apostolic Church between 667 and 677.

Israel came from Othmis in the province of Vanand. He died in 667.

Preceded by Anastasius I	Catholicos of the Holy See of St. Echmiadzin and All Armenians; 667–677	Succeeded by Sahak III
