= Joab I =

Catholicos of Armenia

Catholicos Joab I (Յովաբ Ա Դվնեցի) was the Catholicos-Patriarch of the Armenian Apostolic Church between 790 and 791.

Joab I became Catholicos for a very brief tenure lasting only six months. He was born in Ostan (Vostan), which probably refers to the capital of Dvin.

Preceded by Stephen I	Catholicos of the Holy See of St. Echmiadzin and All Armenians; 790–791	Succeeded by Solomon I
