= Dertad II =

Catholicos of Armenia

Catholicos Dertad II (Տրդատ Բ Դասնավորեցի) was the Catholicos-Patriarch of the Armenian Apostolic Church between 764 and 767.

Dertad II (also called Tiridates) was from Turuberan in the province of Dasnavork' (Dasnavors).

Preceded by Dertad I	Catholicos of the Holy See of St. Echmiadzin and All Armenians; 764–767	Succeeded by Sion I
