= Tzads =

Christian community likely of Armenian origin

The Tzads (Armenian: Tzadn) were a Christian community, most likely of Armenian origin. These were members of the Armenian Apostolic Church who converted to the official Orthodox faith of Caucasian Iberia, which upheld the decrees of the Council of Chalcedon.

They are attested and their society described in details in the work by the tenth-century Armenian chronicler Ukhtanes of Sebastia (c. 935-1000).
