= Fourth Council of Dvin =

- Date: 648
- Accepted by: Armenian Apostolic Church
- Previous council: Third Council of Dvin
- Next council: Fifth Council of Dvin
- Location: Dvin

The Fourth Council of Dvin was a Church Council held in Dvin the ancient capital city of Armenia in 648. The council was presided over by Catholicos Nerses III of Ishkhantsi (641-661) and was attended by 17 participating bishops.

== Overview ==
The council was called by the Armenian Crown and chief Bishops to address the ongoing schism between the Armenian Apostolic Church, and the western Orthodox and Catholic churches. Of particular concern was the recent schism with the Georgian Church, which had originally sided with Armenia in rejecting the Chalcedon canons but has recently changed sides by supporting the Churches of Rome and Constantinople. A strong case of unification with Georgia was pursued at the council but was ultimately rejected.

The council also adopted 12 canons, and strengthened church discipline.

The singing of Armenian Church hymns was also discussed. These were modified by vardapet Barsegh Jon and approved by Catholicos Nerses III. The system is now known as Jonundir, meaning "arranged by Barsegh Jon.".

== Other Dvin councils ==
Some parts of the Armenian church recognize two more councils. In particular, they see an additional earlier meeting in 645 (probably also presided over by Nerses III), which was said to have "strengthened church discipline"

A Fifth Council was held in 719 during the Pontificate of Hovhannes III Otznetzi. The Paulicians and Docetisms were discussed and 32 canons were established, including some on the blessing of marriage and holy objects.

== See also ==
- First Council of Dvin (506)
- Second Council of Dvin (554)
- Third Council of Dvin (607)
- Fifth Council of Dvin (720)
