= Sarkis II the Relic-Carrier =

Armenian Apostolic Catholicos from 1469 to 1474

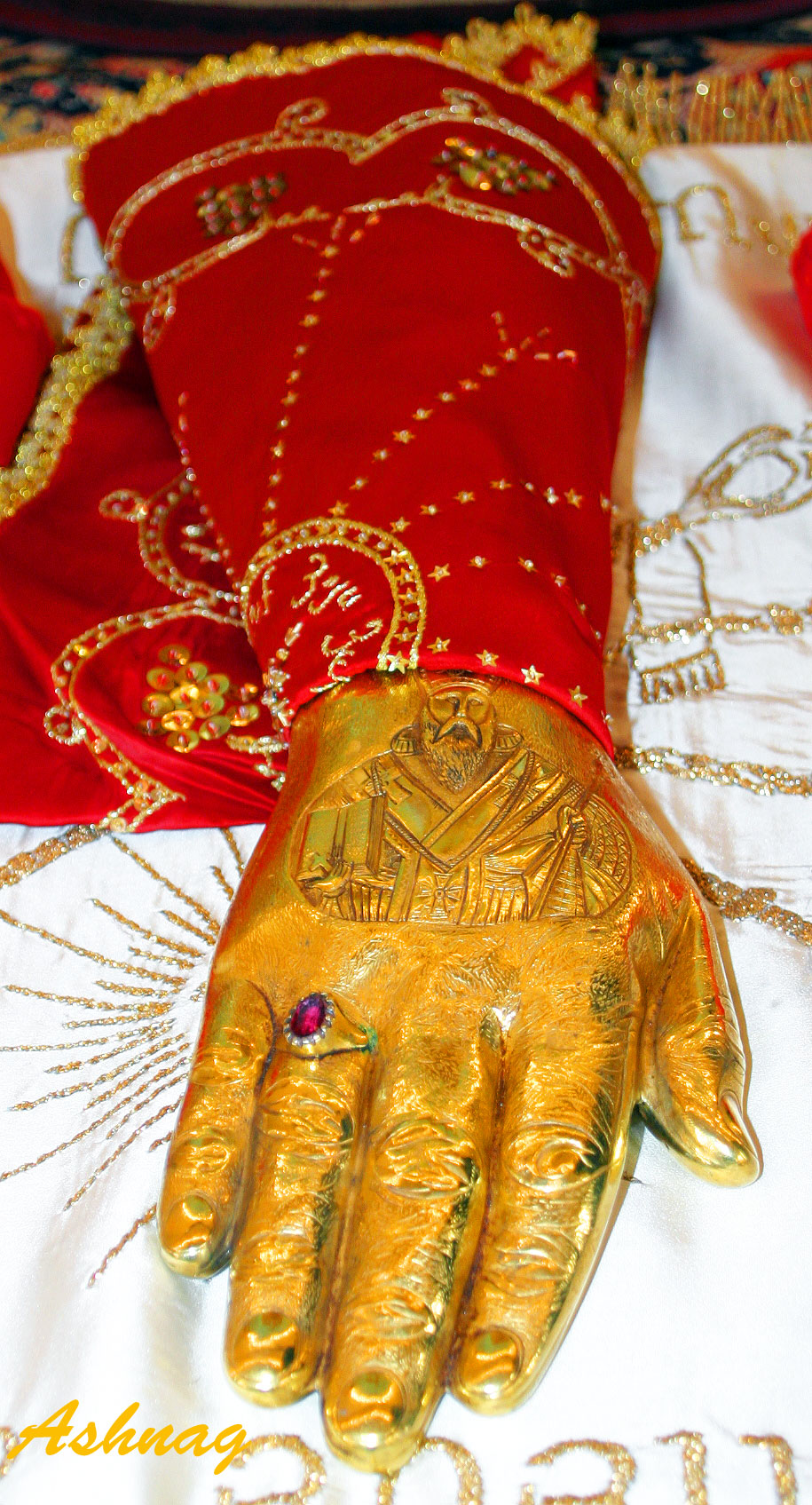
The Right Hand of Gregory the Illuminator

Sarkis II the Relic-Carrier was the Catholicos of Armenian Apostolic Church in 1469–1474.

In 1460 he was an assistant to Zakaria III Akhtamartsi who had taken charge of the general chaos under the Turkoman rulers to try and manoeuvre himself into becoming Catholicos. He was unsuccessful and after a couple of inter-regnum candidates Gregory X (Grigor) became Catholicos, Sarkis transferred his allegiance to Gregory and then to his successor Aristaces II.

Sarkis became Catholicos himself in 1469.

He was called "The Relic Carrier" (Աջատար) because in 1460 he took a relic, supposedly the right hand of Gregory the Illuminator from Etchmiadzin which had now become a dangerous border town and brought it to Tabriz, the political centre. It was a silver case shaped like an arm and fingers which was said to contain the hand of the saint. It was subsequently seized by Zakaria who was trying to set up a rival power base in Aghtamar, and Sarkis sent a bishop to try to get it back. He never did, dying in 1474.

Preceded by Gregory X	Catholicos of the Holy See of St. Echmiadzin and All Armenians; 1469–1474	Succeeded by John VII the Relic-Bearer
