= Nahabed I of Armenia =

Catholicos Nahabed I of Edessa (in Armenian Նահապետ Ա. Եդեսացի) was the Catholicos of the Armenian Apostolic Church between 1691 and 1705.

== Career ==
He made many improvements to Etchmiadzin during his reign and attempted to reunite his countrymen. He wrote to Pope Innocent XII professing submission to the Roman Catholic Church, for which shortly after Nahabed was expelled from Etchmiadzin by a bishop. This Bishop Stephen planned a coup and deposed the Catholicos, putting himself on the throne and reigning for 10 months, at which point the Armenian clergy seized him and restored Nahabed. Stephen's reign is not recognized as a pontifical reign because it was never recognized by other branches of the church as rules dictated needed to be done. Pope Innocent responded to the letter in 1696 with the gift of a papal throne, which is still on display in Etchmiadzin today. Nahabed again wrote of his submission to Rome, a move which inflamed the Armenian Patriarch of Constantinople when he learned of these moves. Much turmoil followed there, with the Patriarchate being usurped multiple times and leading to a division in the people. When Nahabed died there was still much confusion and turmoil amongst the people, and so the pontificate stayed vacant for more than a year until Alexander of Julfa was called to the throne by general consent.

Preceded by Eliazar I of Armenia	Catholicos of the Holy See of St. Echmiadzin and All Armenians; 1691–1705	Succeeded by Alexander I of Armenia
