= Theodore I of Armenia =

Catholicos Theodore I (Թէոդորոս Ա Առտևեցի) was the 60th Catholicos-Patriarch of the Armenian Apostolic Church between 930 and 941.

The primary chronicler records him as originating from the historic district of Artev (probably Artvin), he served a decade-long tenure but chroniclers don't record any other details.

Preceded by Stephen II	Catholicos of the Holy See of St. Echmiadzin and All Armenians; 930–941	Succeeded by Yeghishe
