= Isaac of Armenia =

4th and 5th-century Parthian patriarch and saint

Saint Isaac of Armenia Սահակ Պարթեւ
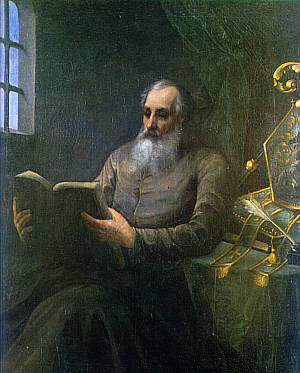
- Portrait by Stepanos Nersissian

Catholicos of All Armenians
- Born: c. 350
- Died: c. 438
- Venerated in: Armenian Apostolic Church; Roman Catholic Church
- Feast: 8 September or the Thursday after the third Sunday after Assumption (Roman Catholic Church); Saturday preceding the penultimate Sunday before Lent (Armenian Apostolic Church)

Isaac or Sahak of Armenia (c. 350 – c. 438) was the catholicos (or patriarch) of the Armenian Church from c. 387 until c. 438. He is sometimes known as Isaac the Great or Sahak the Parthian (Armenian: Սահակ Պարթեւ; Sahak Part῾ew) in reference to his father's Parthian origin. He was the last Armenian patriarch who was directly descended from Gregory the Illuminator, who converted the Kingdom of Armenia to Christianity in the early fourth century and became the first head of the Armenian Church. He supported Mesrop Mashtots in the creation of the Armenian alphabet and personally participated in the translation of the Bible into Armenian.

== Early life ==
Isaac was born c. 350 to the future Catholicos Nerses I (r. c. 353 – c. 373). Through his father he was a descendant of Gregory the Illuminator, who converted the Kingdom of Armenia to Christianity in the early fourth century and became the first head of the Armenian Church. Since that time, the descendants of Gregory had held the office of catholicos of Armenia hereditarily, with some interruptions. According to the anonymous Vita of St. Nerses, Isaac's mother was a Mamikonian princess called Sandukht, whom Nerses married in Caesarea prior to his consecration as catholicos. The Vita claims that Sandukht died after giving birth to Isaac. Another source, the Buzandaran Patmutʻiwnkʻ, neither names Nerses's wife nor mentions his time in Caesarea, while Movses Khorenatsi writes that Nerses married the daughter of "the great noble Aspion" (who is not known from other sources) in Constantinople.

During his father's patriarchate, Isaac studied for many years in Caesarea, Alexandria, and Constantinople. He learned Greek, Syriac and Persian. The Armenian historian Ghazar Parpetsi writes of him that he studied "among many learned Byzantines" and was "fully versed in musical notation, exhortatory rhetoric, and especially philosophy. He was later consecrated as a bishop and preached with his sixty students at Etchmiadzin Cathedral. His father died in c. 373, purportedly poisoned by the Arsacid king of Armenia Pap. At some point, Isaac had a daughter named Sahakanoysh, who later married Hamazasp Mamikonian. It is assumed that his wife died before he became catholicos.

== Patriarchate ==
An imaginary depiction of Isaac by Francesco Maggiotto

=== Election and first deposition ===
Isaac was elected catholicos c. 387 after the death of his predecessor, Aspuraces. He supported King Khosrov IV of Armenia in his efforts to reunite the Armenian realm, which had been partitioned into Roman and Sasanian parts in 387. Khosrov was imprisoned by the Sasanian king in about 389, possibly because of his nomination of Sahak as catholicos without Persian approval. After Khosrov's imprisonment, Isaac was deposed as catholicos, but Khosrov's successor Vramshapuh managed to have him restored to his position.

Through Isaac's efforts the churches and monasteries destroyed by the Persians were rebuilt, education was cared for in a generous way, Zoroastrianism which Shah Yazdegerd I tried to set up was cast out, and three councils held to re-establish ecclesiastical discipline. The catholicos was noted for his ascetic lifestyle.

=== Creation of the Armenian alphabet ===
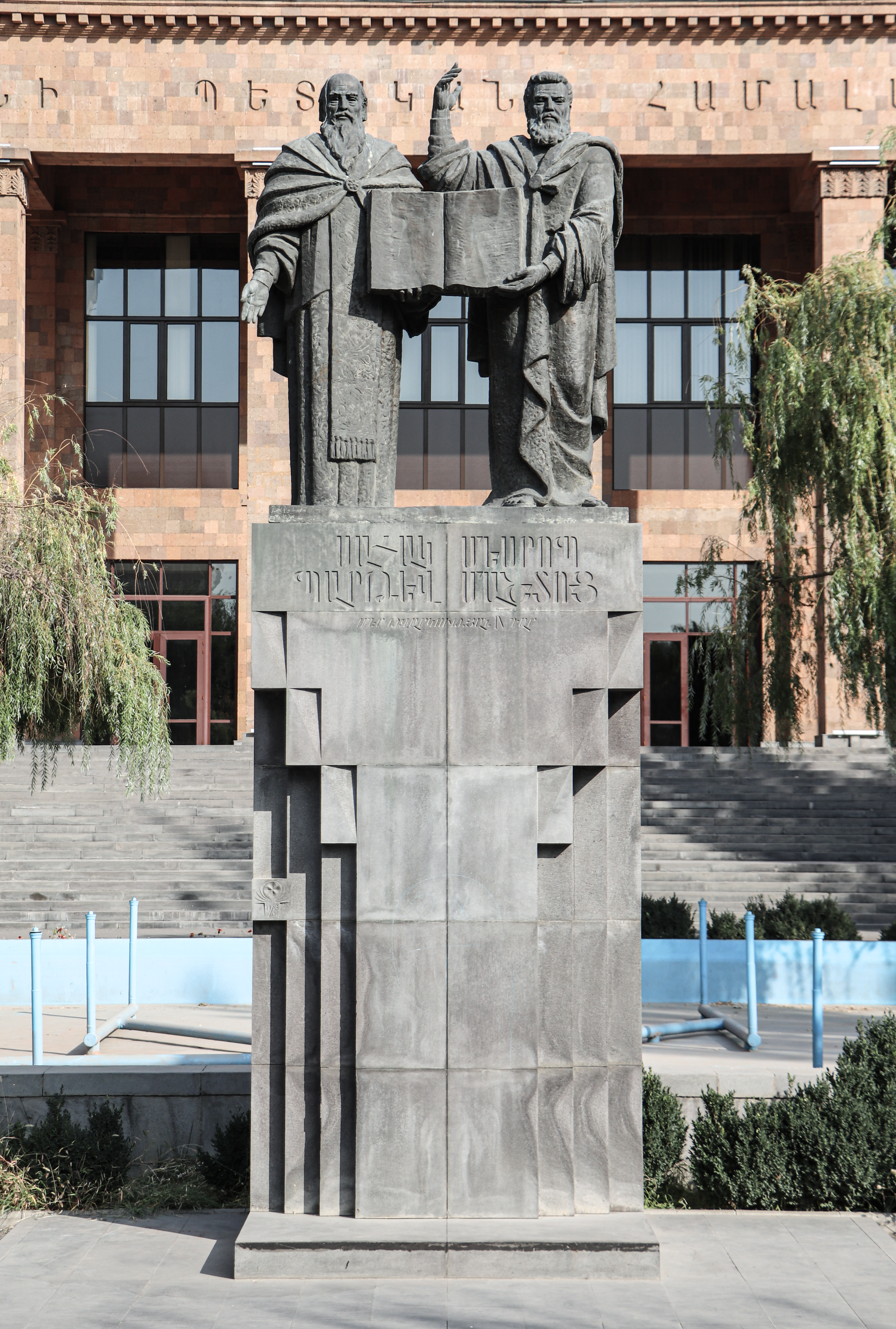
Monument to Catholicos Isaac and Mesrop Mashtots by sculptor Ara Sargsyan in front of the main building of Yerevan State University

Prior to the invention of the Armenian alphabet, the languages of the Armenian Church were Greek and Syriac. Armenia had been divided into Roman and Sasanian client kingdoms in 387. In the Roman part, however, the Armenians were forbidden the use of the Syriac language and used Greek instead, and the country gradually Hellenized; in the Persian part, on the other hand, Greek was absolutely prohibited, while Syriac was used. In this way the ancient culture of the Armenians was in danger of disappearing and national unity was seriously compromised.

Isaac encouraged Mesrop Mashtots to invent the Armenian alphabet and himself translated and revised parts of the Bible. According to Ghazar Parpetsi, Mashtots and the first translators frequently turned to Isaac, who had received a solid education, for assistance while making the alphabet. Their translation from the Syriac Peshitta was revised by means of the Septuagint, and even, it seems, from the Hebrew text (between 410 and 430). The liturgy also, hitherto Syrian, was translated into Armenian, drawing at the same time on the liturgy of Saint Basil of Caesarea, so as to obtain for the new service a national color. Isaac had already established schools for higher education with the aid of disciples whom he had sent to study at Edessa, Melitene, Constantinople, and elsewhere. Through them he now had the principal masterpieces of Greek and Syrian Christian literature translated, e.g., the writings of Athanasius of Alexandria, Cyril of Jerusalem, Basil, Gregory of Nazianzus, Gregory of Nyssa, John Chrysostom, Ephrem the Syrian, and others. The invention of the Armenian alphabet sped up the process of the Christianization of the Armenian population.

=== Second deposition and death ===
In 428, the last Arsacid king of Armenia Artashir was deposed by the Sasanian king with the help of most of the Armenian nobles. Isaac was against this and was himself removed from his position as Catholicos. An Armenian named Surmak was appointed in his place but was soon replaced by the Syrian bishop Brkisho. Isaac was imprisoned in Ctesiphon until 432, when he was allowed to return to Armenia and occupy certain offices within the church. Isaac refused to retake the patriarchate after the death of Catholicos Samuel, Brkisho's Syrian successor, in 437.

Isaac died around 438 in the village of Blur in Bagrevand. His body was taken to Taron and buried in Ashtishat. Since Isaac was the last male of the Gregorid line, his house's territories of Taron, Bagrevand and Acilisene passed to the Mamikonians through Isaac's daughter Sahakanoysh, who was married to the Mamikonian prince Hamazasp.

== Works ==
According to Abraham Terian, the identifiable works attributed to Isaac consist of canons and his two letters to Archbishop Proclus of Constantinople and Bishop Acacius of Melitene. The letter to Proclus is co-authored with Mashtots and concerns confessional matters. It is a reply to a letter sent by Proclus (Epistola II: Ad Armenios, de fide) to the Armenian clergy, which has been preserved in Greek and Armenian translation. The letter to Acacius is also a reply; Acacius's letter to Isaac, and another addressed to the Armenians, have been preserved in Armenian. Some authors have doubted the authenticity of the canons attributed to Isaac, although, according to Terian, these doubts are unjustified. (Note: For the original Armenian texts of Isaac's canons and letters to Proclius and Acacius, see Armenian Classical Authors 2003, pp. 159–224.) Movses Khorenatsi's history quotes letters from Sahak to Eastern Roman emperor Theodosius II, the consul Anatolius, and Archbishop Atticus of Constantinople. Isaac is said to have been the author of liturgical hymns. Four sermons in the Armenian book of hours (zhamagirk) and many hymns (sharakans) are attributed to him.

== Veneration ==
Isaac is venerated as a saint in the Armenian Apostolic and Roman Catholic churches. In the Armenian Apostolic Church, his memorial day is marked twice a year: first, on the Saturday preceding the penultimate Sunday before Lent, thus falling between January 24 and February 28; second, together with Saint Mesrop Mashtots, on the Thursday following the fourth Sunday after Pentecost, thus falling between June 1 and July 16.

== Vision ==
The end of the first section of Ghazar Parpetsi's history contains a description of a vision supposedly seen by Sahak and narrated by him after he refused the request of the Armenian nobility to return to the patriarchal throne. In the vision, Sahak saw various symbols connected with the Church and faith and saw that the Arsacids of Armenia and Gregorids would fall from power and apparently disappear; however, after a period of chaos both would be restored to their respective thrones; his daughter Sahakanoysh would give birth to "powerful and pious men." The passage about Sahak's vision is thought by some scholars to be a later interpolation into Ghazar's sixth-century history, although Gohar Muradyan considers it possible that Ghazar himself wrote it, perhaps drawing from an existing source. Sahak's vision was repeated in many Armenian works and was translated into Greek and thence into Georgian. Some connected it with events in their own time, even as late as the end of the seventeenth century.

== Notes ==
| Preceded by Aspuraces I | Catholicos of the Holy See of St. Echmiadzin and All Armenians; 387–428 | Succeeded by Brkisho of Armenia |
