= Anastasius I of Armenia =

Catholicos of Armenia

Catholicos Anastasius I (Իսրայել Ա Ոթմսեցի) was the Catholicos-Patriarch of the Armenian Apostolic Church between 661 and 667.

Anastasius l came from the village Akori at the foot of Mount Ararat. The town was famous for the Saint Hakob of Akori Monastery, and Anastasius built several buildings there including a new convent, church inns and a hospital for pilgrims. All were destroyed in an earthquake in 1840.

He commissioned Anania Shirakatsi to correct and standardise the Armenian calendar which had no leap year, and the saints days were drifting away from the seasons they were supposed to be in. He died in 667 and the project was scrapped. The problem wasn't fixed until 1084.

Preceded by Nerses III (The Builder)	Catholicos of the Holy See of St. Echmiadzin and All Armenians; 661–667	Succeeded by Israel I
