= Arkina =

Medieval Armenian village

Arkina (Armenian: Արկինա) was a small village in Medieval Armenia within the Shirak district and near the city of Ani.

Arkina is best known for being the temporary seat of the Catholicosate after Ananias I of Armenia moved it from Vaspurakan in 959. His predecessors lived on Agtamar Island but he found it better to seek protection under Ani's king and to establish himself on the mainland. He lived in Arkina until a cathedral and palace were built in Ani.

Arkina had a fortress and perhaps a cathedral, whose ruins are just west of the Tiknis border in present-day Turkey. It would likely have been built by Katholikos Khatchik between 972 and 992; its remaining wall was damaged in a 1966 earthquake.
