= Sion I =

Catholicos of Armenia from 767 to 775

Catholicos Sion I (Սիոն Ա Բավոնեցի) was the Catholicos-Patriarch of the Armenian Apostolic Church between 767 and 775.

Sion was from the village of Bavons in the province of Aragazote (Aragatsotn) and was noted for his wisdom and piety. He elevated 24 canons in the city of Partav (Barda). His pontificate he was troubled by raids from Baghdad when 700 Armenians were massacred and an additional 1200 taken into slavery.

Preceded by Dertad II	Catholicos of the Holy See of St. Echmiadzin and All Armenians; 767–775	Succeeded by Isaiah I
