= John II of Armenia =

Catholicos of the Armenian Church

John II (or of Gabeghen, or Hovhannes II Gabeghentsi or Հովհաննես Բ Գաբեղենցի) was the Catholicos-Patriarch of the Armenian Apostolic Church between 557 and 574.

John came from Sioun-Tseghoun in the Gabeghen canton of Ayrarat. He died in 574.

== Religious Pressure from Persia ==
When he became Catholicos in 557 Armenia was under Persian occupation, part of the Sasanian Empire. The local Persian marzpan, probably acting without imperial authority) started to aggressively promote the Persian Zoroastrianism in Armenia. In 571 the situation worsened with the building of a fire temple in Dvin, the historic capital of the Armenian Church.

This eventually led to open rebellion led by Vardan II Mamikonean (head of one of the powerful Armenian nobles) which was supported by John. The Persian marzpan was killed and after the rebellion was put down Vardan ended up in Constantinople

== Correspondence ==
John attempted to shoe up his Miaphysite base with overtures to Albania. He wrote to the Albanian catholicos Abas (552-596) to share the key tenets of the Miaphysite doctrine at the time in order to check the spreading and growing influence of Nestorianism in Caucasian Albania.

John is known to have written to Mihr-Artashir, ruler of Syunik, and Bishop Vrtanes during the period of Persian Suren (564-572) in Armenia. These are preserved in the Book of Letters.

Preceded by Nerses II	Catholicos of the Holy See of St. Echmiadzin and All Armenians; 557–574	Succeeded by Moses II
