= Mashdotz I =

Catholicos Mashdotz I was the Catholicos of the Armenian Apostolic Church between 897 and 898. He was a monk of Sevanavank monastery and regarded as a very holy man. While a monk, he was asked by sparapet Abas to assist in overthrowing the current Catholicos, George II, and was promised the Catholicosate throne in return. Mashdotz wrote a long letter in response, rejecting the offer to rebel against the Catholicos, and chided Abas for his attempt. The plot failed and Mashdotz continued to be respected for his piety. His nephew, the historian Hovhannes Draskhanakerttsi reports that Mashdotz refused to even maintain a diet of bread and water, only eating vegetables.

Upon the death of George II, King Smbat I and his associates elected Mashdotz the new Catholicos as they were impressed with him. He was known as a holy man and excellent teacher, but died after seven months as Catholicos. The same Hovhannes Draskhanakerttsi was asked by the king to be his replacement.

Preceded by George II of Armenia	Catholicos of the Holy See of St. Echmiadzin and All Armenians; 897–898	Succeeded by John V the Historian
