= Movses III of Armenia =

Movses III (born Movses Datevatsi in Khodanan, 1578; died 14 May 1632) was the Catholicos of the Armenian Apostolic Church between 1629 and 1632.

He was a pioneer of the reform movement within the church and his work was carried on by his successors. He also obtained protection from the Shah of Persia against local Muslim chieftains.

Preceded by David IV	Catholicos of the Holy See of St. Echmiadzin and All Armenians; 1629–1632	Succeeded by Philip
