= Aspuraces I =

Aspuraces I (Armenian: Ասպուրակես Ա. Մանազկերտցի) was a catholicos of the Armenian Apostolic Church. He reigned from 381 to 386 AD and third of three catholicoi from the Albaniosid Dynasty.

Preceded by Zaven I	Catholicos of the Holy See of St. Echmiadzin and All Armenians; 381–386	Succeeded by St. Sahak
