= Ananias I of Armenia =

Catholicos of the Armenian Apostolic Church

Catholicos Ananias I, also known as Anania Mokatsi, was the Catholicos of the Armenian Apostolic Church between 949 and 968.

His predecessor Yeghishe had been deposed as Catholicos and by church regulations no one could be elected during his lifetime. The office was held by a deputy until Yeghishe died two years later and Ananias of Varagavank became pontiff.

Catholicos Ananias moved the seat of the Catholicosate from Vaspurakan at Akhtamar to the town of Arghina. He crowned Ashot III in 961 at his new capital nearby of Ani. In 958 the Catholicos ended the schism of the bishop of Syunik, who was supported by the Catholicos of Albania, at the Council of Kapan by consecrating its new metropolitan. This period showed a great deal of involvement of the king in church activities.

A relative of Ananias later became Catholicos Khachig I of Armenia.

== Literature ==
- Rouben Paul Adalian, Historical Dictionary of Armenia, Scarecrow Press, 2010, 750 pp, c.81
- A. J. Hacikyan, G. Basmajian, E. S. Franchuk, N. Ouzounian: The Heritage of Armenian Literature: From the sixth to the eighteenth century, Literary Collections, 2002, pp. 1108

Preceded by Yeghishe I of Armenia	Catholicos of the Holy See of St. Echmiadzin and All Armenians; 949–968	Succeeded by Vahan I of Armenia
