= Zaven I =

Catholicos of the Armenian Apostolic Church

Zaven I (Armenian: Զավեն Ա. Մանազկերտցի) was a catholicos of the Armenian Apostolic Church. He reigned from 377 to 381 AD and second of three catholicoi from the Albaniosid Dynasty.

Preceded by Sahak I	Catholicos of the Holy See of St. Echmiadzin and All Armenians; 377–381	Succeeded by Aspuraces I
