= Dertad I =

Catholicos of Armenia

Catholicos Dertad I was the Catholicos-Patriarch of the Armenian Apostolic Church between 741 and 764.

According to the historian Kirakos Ganjaketsi, Dertad (also called Tiridates) was from Otmus village and was a 'modest, blessed man, radiant in all virtue'. He reigned in a time of relative peace with a break in the Arab invasions.

Towards the end of his reign, the Armenians suffered heavy taxation imposed by the Saracens, compounded by a harvest failure from a sudden hailstorm, and a subsequent plague of locusts. Dertad was unable to alleviate these crises, and died "under the pressure of grief".

Preceded by David I of Armenia	Catholicos of the Holy See of St. Echmiadzin and All Armenians; 741–764	Succeeded by Dertad II
