= Gevorg II of Armenia =

Catholicos of the Armenian Apostolic Church

Catholicos Gevorg II of Garni (Գևորգ Գառնեցի) was the Catholicos of the Armenian Apostolic Church between 877 and 897. His contemporary Hovhannes Draskhanakerttsi described him as an honorable man who was selected from the Catholicos's household by Prince Ashot I of Armenia to succeed Patriarch Zakaria. Gevorg blessed and crowned Ashot I when he was declared King of Armenia in 884. Upon King Ashot's death, Gevorg went to Bagaran to preside over his funeral. Ashot's heir Smbat I, who had been away at war, missed his father's funeral and was very grieved. Catholicos Gevorg went to comfort King Smbat at Yerazgavors, where he would later also preside at his coronation. This enraged the sparapet Abas, who is said to have spread false rumors about the Catholicos in an attempt to bring him down. Abas tried to convince a holy man named Mashtots from Sevanavank to join his conspiracy against the Catholicos and said he would name him Catholicos if it was successful. Mashtots wrote a long letter in response, rejecting the offer to rebel against the Catholicos and chided Abas for his attempt. Hovhannes Draskhanakerttsi reports that several of the slanderers were then struck down and died, as if by divine wrath; the others, and Abas himself, repented to the Catholicos and were forgiven. Around this time Dvin was hit by an earthquake, as it had been during Patriarch Zakaria's time, but this time it destroyed the church of the Catholicosate, as well as many other buildings and people.

Afshin, the Caliph's representative in Atropatene, who had made an agreement of friendship with Smbat, was worried at the various victories Smbat was having and that he might not remain faithful to their agreement if he became too strong. Afshin invaded Armenia and reached Dvin. War broke out and Catholicos Gevorg went to meet Afshin in an attempt to get him to reconsider. Afshin attempted to get Gevorg to bring King Smbat to him for a discussion, but the nakharars advised the king not to go for fear of a trap. They also begged the Catholicos not to return to Afshin, but Gevorg insisted. Afshin saw that the Catholicos could not bring the King to him, so he had Gevorg bound with iron fetters and handcuffs. Afshin marched against King Smbat and they met in battle, after which they agreed that Smbat would pay royal taxes to Afshin and reconfirm his oath. Afshin did not return the Catholicos, however, who remained bound and suffered greatly. After two months of captivity a ransom was demanded for the Catholicos's release. His bishops, including Hovhannes Draskhanakerttsi, approached the nakharars and the ransom was gathered. Gevorg had been brought to Paytakaran, where the ransom was paid through Prince Hamam of the East, and he was returned to Armenia.

Catholicos Gevorg died in Vaspurakan in 897 and his body was taken to the cemetery of Dzoroy Vank in Tosp. The king and his associates then elected Mashtots to succeed him, the same Mashtots who had previously rejected the chance to overthrow his predecessor.

Preceded by Zacharias I of Armenia	Catholicos of the Holy See of St. Echmiadzin and All Armenians; 877–897	Succeeded by Mashdotz I
