= George I (Armenian catholicos) =

Armenian Catholicos from 792 to 795

Catholicos George I (Գեւորգ Ա Բջնեցի) was the Catholicos-Patriarch of the Armenian Apostolic Church between 792 and 795.

George came from the village of Bjni in the province of Kotayk, following Solomon. He was in position for three years. During his short reign the local Abbasid governors (called ostikans) applied pressure on him both politically and fiscally.

Preceded by Solomon I	Catholicos of the Holy See of St. Echmiadzin and All Armenians; 792–795	Succeeded by Joseph I
