= Sarkis I of Armenia =

Catholicos of the Armenian Apostolic Church

Catholicos Sarkis I (Armenian: Սարգիս Ա. Սևանցի) was the Catholicos of the Armenian Apostolic Church between 992 and 1019. He was said to be mild mannered and humble, so that even as leader of the church he lived simply like a hermit. A terrible earthquake struck the land around the fourth year of his reign. The dormant sect of anti-clerical Tondrakians was revived during Sarkis's reign and he condemned it as anathema. He died shortly after and was succeeded by Peter I of Armenia, brother of the previous Catholicos Khachig I.

Preceded by Khachig I of Armenia	Catholicos of the Holy See of St. Echmiadzin and All Armenians; 992–1019	Succeeded by Peter I of Armenia
