= Joseph I (Armenian catholicos) =

Catholicos of Armenia

Catholicos Joseph I (Հովսեփ Բ Փարպեցի) was the Catholicos-Patriarch of the Armenian Apostolic Church between 795 and 806.

Joseph (identified by the Armenian historian Michael Chamich as Joseph II) was known as Karich (կարիճ) the Scorpion. The local governor Khuzima who had been a hero for defying the caliph and restoring peace, asked to buy three villages from Joseph which were part of the pontifical estate. Joseph refused and Khuzima seized the ancient imperial site of Artashat (Artaxata). Joseph's brother threatened to appeal to the Caliph so Khuzima had him assassinated. Joseph then became ill and died.

Preceded by George I of Armenia	Catholicos of the Holy See of St. Echmiadzin and All Armenians; 795–806	Succeeded by David II
