= Khachik II of Cilicia =

Catholicos of the Armenian Apostolic Church

Khachik II was the Catholicos of the Armenian Apostolic Church between 1058 and 1065. He succeeded his uncle Peter I of Armenia still in the city of Ani. He was summoned to Constantinople on the assumption that his uncle had been in possession of the treasures of the Armenian kings which the emperor wanted, but Peter did not have any of it. Khachik remained there for three years and the emperor tried to get the Armenians to switch to using the Greek religious rites. The clergy drew up a statement that they would never submit to the Greek rite, causing the Byzantines to look upon the Armenians as infidels.

In 1064 a large Seljuk army, headed by Sultan Alp Arslan, attacked Ani and after a month's siege it was sacked and the populace massacred. During these times Khachik was living at Tavbloor and after being given report of what happened at Ani he was extremely grieved and died shortly after. On his death the Byzantines hoped to leave Armenia without a pontiff for good, part of an effort to subdue them as a people and assimilate them into the Greek rite. However, Mary the daughter of King Gagik-Abas of Kars was a favorite of Byzantine Empress Eudokia Makrembolitissa and obtained through her influence the permission to fill the empty seat.

Preceded by Peter I of Armenia as Catholicos of Armenia	Catholicos of the Holy See of Cilicia and Catholicos of the Holy See of Armenia; 1058–1065	Succeeded by Gregory II the Martyrophile, Gregory II "Vkayaser" Pahlavuni
