= David I of Armenia =

Catholicos of Armenia

David I (also Dawit) was the Catholicos-Patriarch of the Armenian Apostolic Church between 728 and 741. He was from Aramus (then called Aramonk) in the district of Kotayk. He moved the Armenian Apostolic Church's Holy See from Dvin to Aramonk due to Dvin's fall to Arab hands and "the numerous deeds of wickedness" from the population there. Catholicos David built a church and patriarchal residence there, near which he was buried upon his death.

| Preceded by John III the Philosopher | Catholicos of the Holy See of St. Echmiadzin and All Armenians; 728–741 | Succeeded by Dertad I |
