= Alexander I of Julfa =

Persian religious figure (??–1714)

Catholicos Alexander I of New Julfa, Persia (in Armenian Ալեքսանդր Ա Ջուղայեցի) ( d. 22 November 1714) was the Catholicos of the Armenian Apostolic Church between 1706 and 1714.

Alexander was from New Julfa of the Armenian community in Persia. Prior to his election as Catholicos of All Armenians, he served as Archbishop of New Julfa from 1699 to 1706. In Persia he had been known as a defender of the faith of the Armenian Apostolic Church against the activities of the Catholic missionaries and in 1682 had published his book defending the traditional faiths of the church under the title Girk' atenakan, vor asi Vichabanakan. He also opposed the Armenians who had accepted Catholicism.

The turmoil had engulfed the Armenian church during the reign of the incumbent Catholicos Nahabed I as a result of deep divisions in the Armenian church after he professed submission to the Roman Catholic Church. Nahabed's move had resulted in a rebellion by Bishop Stephen in Etchmiadzin deposing him briefly for 10 months and Stephen declaring himself as catholicos. Although catholicos Nahabed was reinstated later, his move had also inflamed the Armenian Patriarch of Constantinople resulting in the Patriarchate being usurped multiple times and leading to a division in the people. When Catholicos Nahabed died in 1705, there was still much confusion and turmoil amongst the people and so the pontificate stayed vacant for more than a year until Alexander of Julfa was called to the throne by general consent in 1706.

Although initially Alexander I sent a letter of allegiance to ruling Pope Clement XI in 1707 at the beginning of his reign, Catholicos Alexander II soon afterwards became in conflict with the Roman Catholic Church greatly concerned and exasperated with the excessive activism of the Catholic missionaries. In a letter in 1709 to Pope Clement, he compared the tolerant attitude of the Shah of Persia a "non-Christian" as compared to the Catholic missionaries who considered the Armenian Christians as "schismatics and heretics".

As a result of his efforts, two decrees were issued by then incumbent Safavid king (shah) Sultan Husayn (r. 1694–1722) that restricted the rights of the Catholic missionaries' rights with respect to the Armenian population living within the Safavid Empire. The first of these "anti-Catholic" decrees was issued in May 1710, while the second decree was issued in 1712.

Alexander I died in Etchmiadzin on 22 November 1714 and was buried west of the main cathedral.

== Sources ==
- Floor, Willem; Herzig, Edmund (2012). Iran and the World in the Safavid Age. I.B. Tauris. ISBN 978-1850439301.
- Hacikyan; et al. (2005). The Heritage of Armenian Literature: From the eighteenth century to modern times. Wayne State University Press. p. 112. ISBN 978-0814332214. "Catholicos Agheksandr of Julfa (1706-14)"

Preceded by Nahabed I of Armenia	Catholicos of the Holy See of St. Echmiadzin and All Armenians; 1706–1714	Succeeded by Asdvadzadur of Armenia
