= Fifth Council of Dvin =

- Date: 720
- Accepted by: Armenian Apostolic Church
- Previous council: Fourth Council of Dvin
- Location: Dvin

The Fifth Council of Dvin (Դվինի եկեղեցական ժողով)was a Church Council held in Dvin the ancient capital city of Armenia in 720. The council was presided over by John III the Philosopher (Catholicos 717–728, also known as Hovhannes III Otznetzi) and was attended by 30 bishops, Prince Ashot Patrik (who was possibly Ashot III Bagratuni), and a number of other nakharars.

Some authors call this the Sxith council of Dvin, by counting the two councils of Dvin (645 and 648) separately. The Armenian book of Canon Law (written by John himself) assigns it the ordinal V.

== Reasons for calling the council ==
John III the Philosopher was concerned about the spiritual welfare of the Armenians and had stated “We see lack of discipline among our people, even among the faithful of our church" referring to the “heretical” sects that had recently appeared. These sects rejected the theology of the Armenians, which had been agreed at previous councils.

=== The Heresy of Paulicianism ===
The council was primarily concerned about the theology of the Paulicians who had emerged in the mid 7th century. They were probably dualist and may have disputed the Trinity and the essential nature of Christ, similar to the much earlier Arianism. John noted that they were hiding on the border of his realm at the time of his enthronement. (Redgate p 248).

This was a risk to the established church and John in particular as they rejected the hierarchy of the Patriarch, bishops, canons and priests. His expressed concern about the reliability of "the 29 leaders of the dioceses,” may mean that some of his bishops may already have been taking on aspects of Paulicianism, evidenced by his writing Against the Docetists.

John's main charges against the Paulicians were rejecting the cross and the Eucharist, and of holding Zoroastrian beliefs such as sun worship. (Redgate p194)

=== Clergy Discipline ===
Much anger arose from the "irregular lives" many of the clergy (possibly corruption, neglecting their duties or violating celibacy) and so the Council established 32 canons (laws) prohibiting excessive drinking, otherwise they were to be denied Holy Communion.

=== The pro-Greek factions ===
In 647 Emperor Constantine had ordered that the Armenians should follow the Greek doctrine, and by the time of the Council many Armenians had seemingly become pro-Greek (Chalcedonian) and this caused schism with the Armenians in several ways.

At Holy Communion, they preferred the Greek custom which used leavened bread and wine mixed with water, whereas the Armenians used unleavened bread and unmixed wine. This faction followed the Greeks who omitted the phrase "who was crucified for us'' in the Trisagion and asserted that the birth of Christ should be celebrated on December 25th, separate from January 6th.

This council did not solve the above issues, they were mainly addressed six years later in Manzikert.

== Outcome ==
=== Heresy Condemnation ===
The Paulician doctrine (and its similar sect, Phantasiasm) was declared heresy and its followers were anathematised (excommunicated). This was completed six years later in Manzikert when it was made illegal for Armenians to engage with Paulician heretics in any way. A splinter group, the Julianites, were also condemned.

=== Church Governance and Clergy Behaviour ===
They enacted thirty-two canons for the future government of the church. There were restrictions on the days and places of marriage ceremonies, they could now only take place in a church. Likewise churches had to have a fixed stone altar and font, this was to check the Paulicians who had a series of "house churches", and did not use fixed buildings.

There were edicts to curb drunkenness in both the clergy and the laity, which as well as improving standard may have been enacted to impress the teetotal Muslims. (Redgate p185).

=== Ritual Objects ===
John stressed that divine power entered church artefacts through the rite of consecration, and only then could they perform miracles. (Redgate, p194) This explicit approval of crosses and books would have been to counter the Paulicians were extreme iconoclasts.

== See also ==
- First Council of Dvin (506)
- Second Council of Dvin (554)
- Third Council of Dvin (607)
- Fourth Council of Dvin (648)
- Redgate, A. E. (2000). The Armenians. Oxford: Blackwell Publishers.
