= Stephen II of Armenia =

Catholicos Stephen II (Ստեփանոս Բ Ռշտունի) was the 59th Catholicos-Patriarch of the Armenian Apostolic Church between 929 and 930.

Stephen came from the prominent Rshtuni family which is native to the region of Rshtunik by the southern shore of Lake Van (often associated with the island stronghold of Aghtamar), he held the office for about a single year.

Preceded by John V the Historian	Catholicos of the Holy See of St. Echmiadzin and All Armenians; 929–930	Succeeded by Theodore I
