= Pharen I of Armenia =

Pharen I of Armenia (Armenian: Փառեն Ա. Աշտիշատցի) was the 17th Catholicos-Patriarch of the Armenian Apostolic Church.

He started his reign of Catholicoi after the death of Daniel I of Armenia, in which, he succeeded him in c. 348. He reigned for 5 years until his death on c. 352 and was succeeded by St. Nerses I the Great.

Preceded by Daniel I of Armenia	Catholicos of the Holy See of St. Echmiadzin and All Armenians; 348–352	Succeeded by St. Nerses I the Great
