= Solomon I (Armenian catholicos) =

Catholicos of Armenia from 791 to 792

Catholicos Solomon I (Սողոմոն Ա Գառնեցի) was the Catholicos of All Armenians of the Armenian Apostolic Church for less than a year between 791 and 792.

Solomon was an old man when called to the pontificate and came from Gegharkunik. He was educated in the convent of Makenravank (still standing today as the Makenis Monastery) and became well-regarded as a scholar. He subsequently became noted as a hermit, before being called as pontiff late in his life.

At his enthronement, his age caused much concern so he declared that his official portrait should be painted all black in deference to his predecessors and his belief that he could not fulfill the office. He died less than a year after becoming the catholicos.

Preceded by Joab I	Catholicos of the Holy See of St. Echmiadzin and All Armenians; 791–792Michael Chamich	Succeeded by George I
