= Surb Nshan Monastery =

Former Armenian monastery in Turkey

Monastery of the Holy Sign of Sebastia Սուրբ Նշան վանք Սեբաստիո
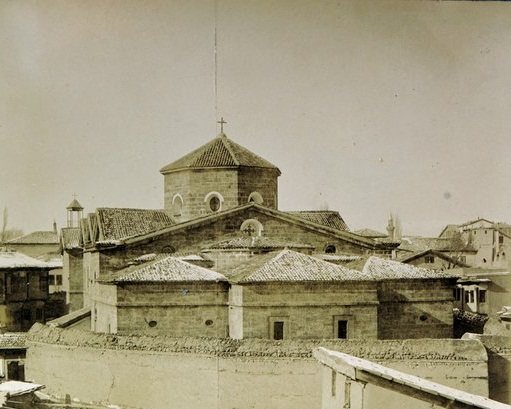

- Location within Turkey

Religion
- Affiliation: Armenian Apostolic Church
- Province: Sivas Province
- Region: Central Anatolia Region
- Ecclesiastical or organisational status: Destroyed
- Status: Ceased functioning as a monastery in 1915

Location
- Location: Turkey
- Coordinates: 39.840861°N 36.942373°E

Architecture
- Type: Church
- Style: Armenian
- Completed: 10th century

The Monastery of the Holy Sign (Armenian: Սուրբ Նշան վանք Սեբաստիո) is a former Armenian monastic complex near the city of Sivas in Turkey. Built in the 10th century, it ceased functioning as a monastery after the Armenian genocide in 1915.

== History ==
Sourb Nshan monastery was established by prince Atom-Ashot, the son of King Senekerim. The monastery was named after a celebrated relic that Senekerim had brought from Varagavank monastery, and which was returned there after his death. This was one of notable center of enlightenment and scholarship of Lesser Armenia during Byzantine, Seljuk Sultanate of Rum and Ottoman reigns until the Armenian genocide in 1915. In 1915 the Holy Sign monastery was the main repository of medieval Armenian manuscripts in the Sebastia region and at least 283 manuscripts are recorded. The library was not destroyed during the Armenian Genocide and most of the manuscripts survived. In 1918 about 100 of them were transferred to the holdings of the Armenian Patriarchate in Jerusalem. Later, everything of the Sivas monastery was destroyed.

== Current condition ==
The monastery today is entirely destroyed and a sprawling military base occupies the site. The date of the destruction is uncertain. The monastery stood on a low hill overlooking Sivas and was surrounded by a plain and undefended outer wall. On one side of that enclosure wall, encircled by a wall of mud brick, was a large garden containing fruit trees and vegetable plots. Several farms were also attached to the monastery.

== Appearance ==
The monastery had three churches – their names were Surb Astvatsatsin (Armenian: Սուրբ Աստվածածին) (Holy Mother of God), Surb Khatch (Armenian: Սուրբ Խաչ) (Holy Cross), and Surb Hovhannes Karapet (Armenian: Սուրբ Հովհաննես Կարապետ) (St John the Precursor).
