= Holy oils in the Catholic Church =

Oils considered holy in Catholicism

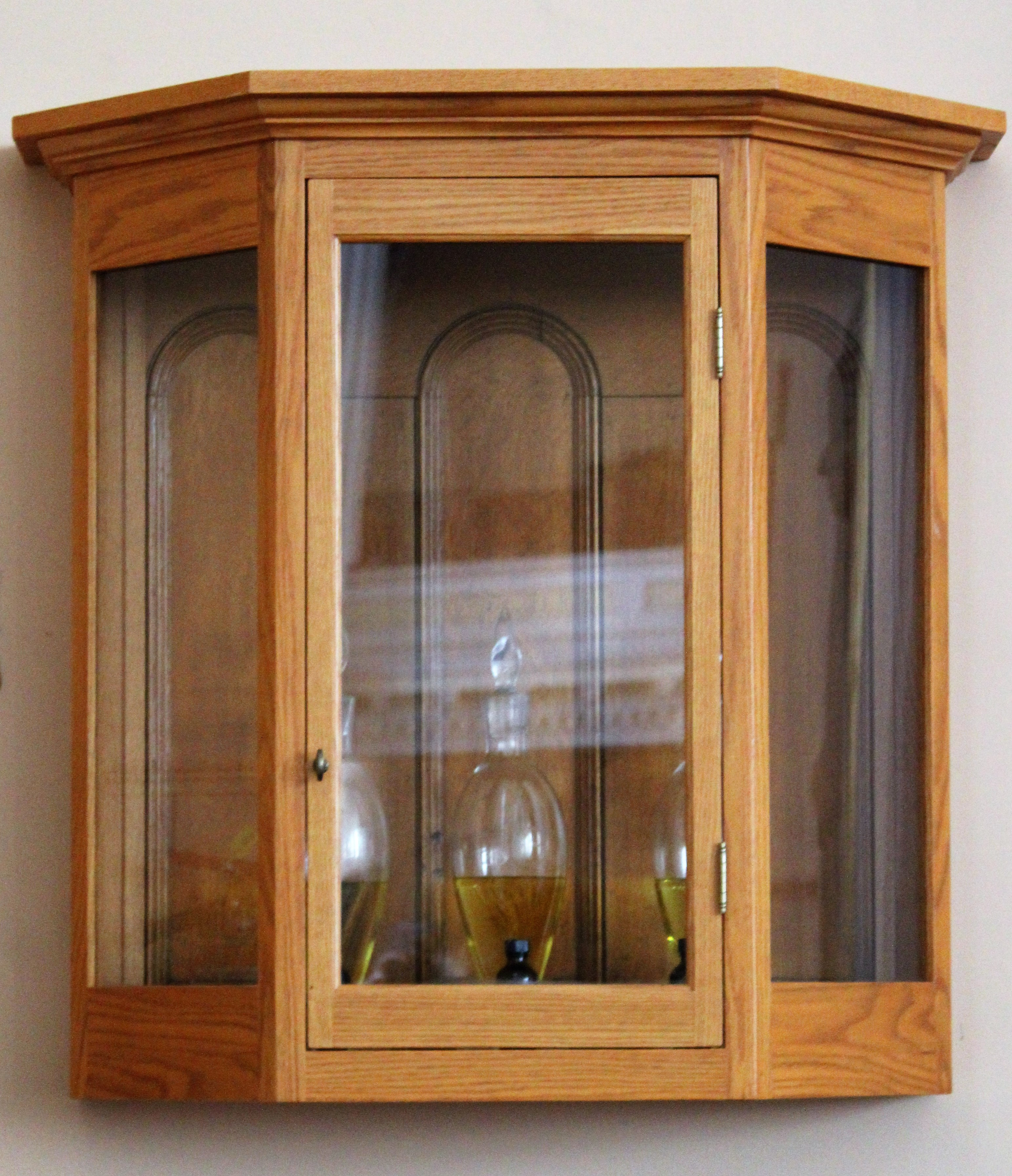
Holy oils housed in an aumbry.

Holy oils are oils used by the Roman Catholic Church for religious ceremonies. There are three types of holy oils. These are oil of the catechumens, oil of the sick, and chrism oil. They are consecrated at a mass called the chrism mass.

== Oil of the sick ==
The oil of the sick is used in the sacrament of anointing of the sick. The oil itself is pure olive oil. (Note: If olive oil is difficult or impossible to obtain, another plant oil can be used) The oil may be labeled "OI", which means "Oleum Infirmorum". Scriptural basis is found for using oil to anoint the sick in James 5:14.

== Oil of the catechumens ==
The oil of the catechumens is used for anointing people prior to baptism. Like the oil of the sick, it is pure olive oil. It was called oil of exorcism by early Christians. The oil may be labeled "OC", which means "Oleum Catechumenorum" or "OS", which means "Oleum Sanctum".

== Chrism oil ==
The chrism oil is used during confirmation, during the sacrament of holy orders for ordaining a priest and consecrating a bishop, after baptism, and during the dedication of a church. It is made from olive oil combined with balsam. The oil may be labeled "SC", which means "Sanctum Chrisma". Unlike the other two oils, which are both simply pure olive oil that is blessed, the process for making chrism oil is more complicated. First, the bishop celebrating the chrism mass mixes pure olive oil with balsam. Then the bishop breathes on the mixture, signifying the Holy Spirit's presence, before consecrating the oil with a prayer.
