= Avan, Armenia =

Avan Ավան
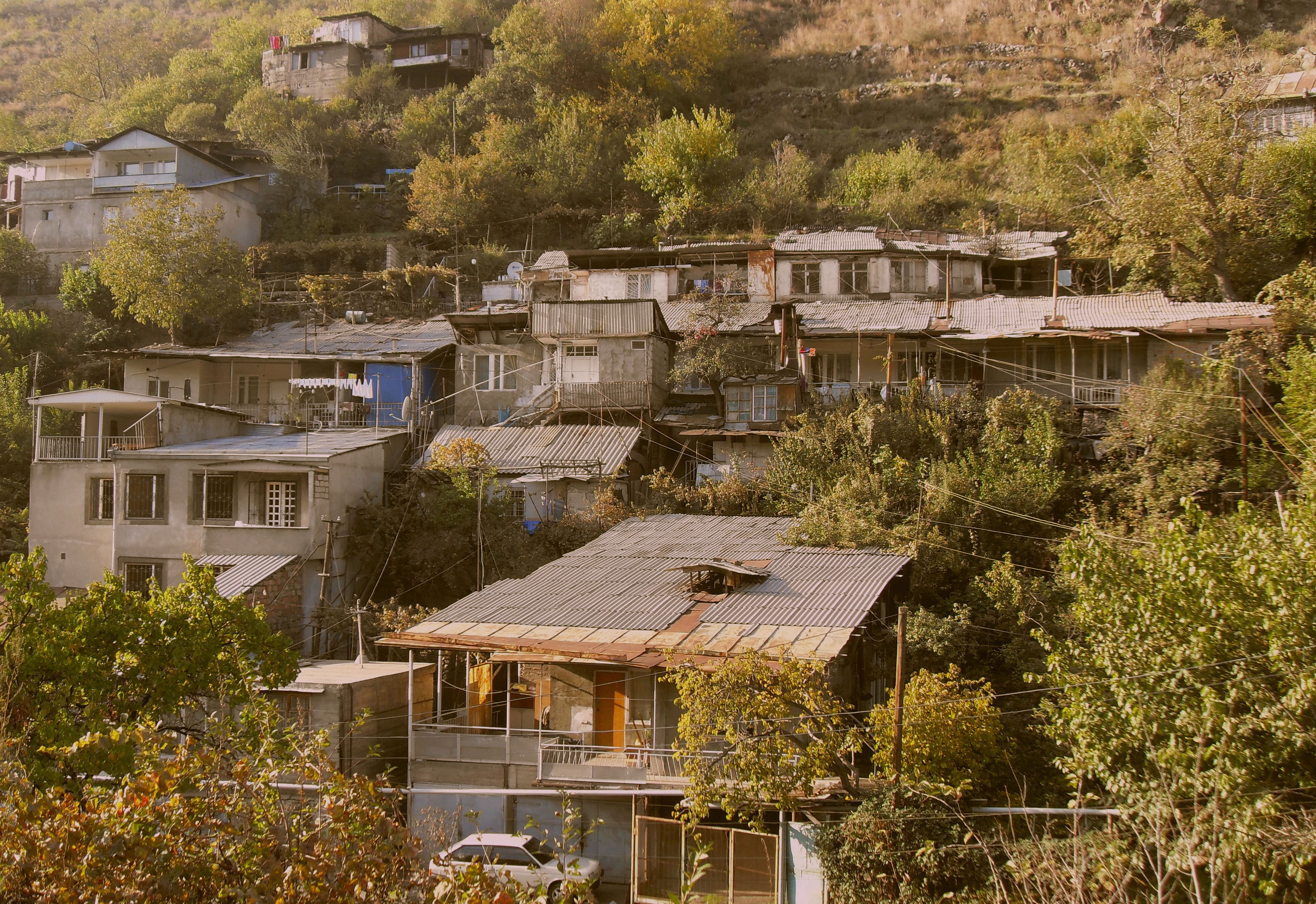
- Avan

- Location within Armenia Location within Aragatsotn
- Coordinates: 40°20′07″N 44°10′06″E
- Country: Armenia
- Province: Aragatsotn
- Municipality: Ashtarak

Population (2011)
  - Total: 715
- Time zone: UTC+4
  - Summer (DST): UTC+5

Avan (Armenian: Ավան) is a village in the Ashtarak Municipality of the Aragatsotn Province of Armenia. The population of the village is mainly Armenian. It is home to the basilica-style church of Surb Astvatsatsin that sits along a street just off the main road beside the main cemetery. The large cemetery contains many khachkars from the 13th to 18th centuries. Adjacent to it across the street is a stepped plinth and broken funerary pillar monument of the 5th to 6th centuries. A worn inscription may be found along the landings of the second and third steps. There is a newly built church also by the name of Surb Astvatsatsin that sits near the main highway closer to the centre of the village, and is said to have been constructed upon old foundations. Some confusion may arise since two churches in the village are referred to as S. Astvatsatsin, but one of them may be the church of S. Hovhannes. They are said to have been first built in the 5th to 6th centuries, were reconstructed in the 13th century, and have sat in ruins until recently since the earthquake of 1679.
