= First Council of Dvin =

- Date: 506
- Accepted by: Armenian Apostolic Church
- Next council: Second Council of Dvin
- Convoked by: Babgen I Umtsetsi
- Location: Dvin

The First Council of Dvin (Armenian: Դվինի առաջին ժողով, Dvini ařaĵin žoğov or Դվինի Ա ժողով, Dvini A žoğov) was a church council held in 506 in the city of Dvin (then in Sasanian Armenia). It was convened to discuss the Henotikon, a christological document issued by Byzantine emperor Zeno in an attempt to resolve theological disputes that had arisen from the Council of Chalcedon.

The Council was convoked by the Catholicos of the Armenian Apostolic Church Babgen I Umtsetsi. Besides the Armenians, delegates from the Georgian and Albanian churches were present. According to the Book of Epistles, 20 bishops, 14 laymen, and many Nakharars (princes) attended the council.

The Armenian Church had not accepted the conclusions of the Council of Chalcedon, which had defined that Christ is 'acknowledged in two natures', and condemned the exclusive use of the formula "from two natures". The latter insisted on the unification of human and divine natures into one composite nature of Christ, and rejected any severing of the natures in reality after the union. This formula was professed by Sts Cyril of Alexandria and Dioscorus of Alexandria. Miaphysitism was the doctrine of the Armenian Church among others. The Henotikon, Emperor Zeno's attempt at conciliation, was published in 482. It reminded bishops of the condemnation of Nestorian doctrine, which emphasized the human nature of Christ, and did not mention the Chalcedonian dyophysite creed. The First Council of Dvin was thus able to accept the Henotikon and keep open a possibility of conciliation with the Patriarchate of Constantinople while remaining steady in its christological doctrine.

The Council stopped short of formally rejecting the Chalcedonian Definition of the dual nature of Christ. Such a step, which formalized the Armenian break from the Roman church, would not take place until the Second Council of Dvin, in 554/555. According to Karekin Sarkissian, in the first council of Dvin there is "the first official and formal rejection of the Council of Chalcedon by the Armenian Church".

The Acts of the Council were discovered by Karapet Ter Mkrtchian and published by him in 1901.

== See also ==
- Second Council of Dvin
- Third Council of Dvin
- Fourth Council of Dvin (648)
- Fifth Council of Dvin (720)

== Sources ==
- Meyendorff, John (1989). Imperial unity and Christian divisions: The Church 450-680 A.D. The Church in history. Vol. 2. Crestwood, NY: St. Vladimir's Seminary Press.
- Ostrogorsky, George (1956). History of the Byzantine State. Oxford: Basil Blackwell.
