= Nerses I =

Armenian Catholicos (335–373)

Saint Nerses Ներսէս Ա
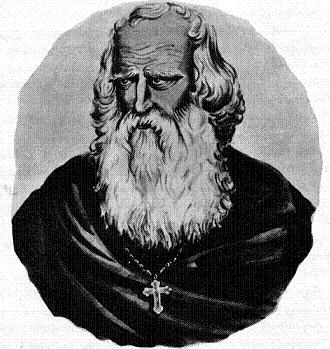
- A nineteenth-century imaginary depiction of Nerses
- Born: Fourth century
- Died: 373
- Venerated in: Catholic Church; Eastern Orthodox Church; Oriental Orthodox Church; Anglican Communion
- Feast: 19 November

There was also a Caucasian Albanian Catholicos Nerses I, who ruled in 689–706, and a Patriarch Nerses I of Constantinople, who ruled in 1704.

Nerses I the Great (Armenian: Ներսէս Ա Մեծ, romanized: Nersēs A Mets; died c. 373), also known as Nerses the Parthian (Ներսէս Պարթև, Nersēs Part’ev), was an Armenian Catholicos (or Patriarch) who lived in the fourth century.

== Early life ==
Nerses was the son of Atanagines and the Arsacid princess Bambishn. His paternal grandfather was Catholicos Husik, whose paternal grandfather was Saint Gregory the Illuminator, the founder of the Armenian Church. The main source for Nerses's life, the fifth-century Buzandaran Patmutʻiwnkʻ (traditionally attributed to Faustus of Byzantium), calls Bambishn a sister of King Tiran of Armenia, although this poses certain chronological and genealogical difficulties, as Atanagines's father Husik is said to have married the daughter of the same king. (Note: According to Nina Garsoïan, the generational gap is likely the result of a slip of the pen, but these marriages may also reflect the continuance of Zoroastrian-style consanguineous marriages in early Christian Armenia.) Additionally, Bambishn was a title borne by royal ladies in the Sasanian period, so this is probably a title rather than her actual name. Since the time of Gregory the Illuminator, Nerses's family had held the leadership of the Church in Armenia as their hereditary right, although this inheritance was temporarily interrupted when Nerses's father and uncle refused the patriarchate and instead pursued military careers.

Nerses received a Hellenistic education in Caesarea in Cappadocia and presumably married there. His wife's name is not mentioned in the Buzandaran Patmutʻiwnkʻ, but a later Vita of Nerses, derivative of the Buzandaran Patmutʻiwnkʻ, reports that he married a Mamikonian princess called Sandukht, who died after bearing Nerses a son called Sahak (Isaac), who would later become catholicos. After the death of his wife, he pursued a military career and was appointed senekapet (literally 'chamberlain', but here perhaps signifying 'sword-bearer') to the Arsacid king Arshak II. A few years later, having entered the ecclesiastical state, he was elected catholicos probably in 353 and confirmed in the office in Caesarea in accordance with tradition. He was the last Armenian patriarch to be consecrated at Caesarea.

== Patriarchate ==
His patriarchate marks a new era in Armenian history. Until that point, the Church had been more or less identified with the royal family and the nobles; Nerses brought it into closer connection with the people. At the Council of Ashtishat (c. 356) he promulgated numerous laws on marriage, fast days, and divine worship. Among other things, the council forbade people to marry their first cousin and forbade mutilation and other extreme actions in mourning. Nerses built schools, hospitals, leprosaria and poor houses and sent monks throughout the land to preach the Gospel.

Nerses's relations with Arshak II, however, soon deteriorated. Some of the catholicos's reforms caused the King's displeasure. Nerses also clashed with Arshak over the latter's extermination of certain Armenian noble houses. Nerses made a visit to Constantinople to secure the release of royal hostages and receive Olympias, Arshak's new Roman bride, who probably left with a later embassy after Nerses's departure. Arshak, like his father, pursued a pro-Arian policy, which led to a falling out with Catholicos Nerses. According to the Buzandaran Patmutʻiwnkʻ, Nerses never again appeared at Arshak's court after the King ordered the murder of his own nephew, Gnel, in defiance of the catholicos's exhortations. In 359/360, Nerses was exiled for some nine years along with other anti-Arian bishops.

Upon the accession of pro-Arian king Pap in 369/370, Nerses returned to his see. Nerses undertook the reconstruction of Armenian churches and monasteries that had been destroyed during the Persian occupation of Armenia and strove toward the elimination of Zoroastrian influence in the country. The classical Armenian historians write that Pap proved a dissolute and unworthy ruler and Nerses forbade him entrance to the church. Other historians believe that Nerses tried to bring the young king under his control using his considerable influence and enlisting the help of some Armenian princes, prompting Pap to dissolve the Patriarch's benevolent institutions and confiscate holdings belonging to the Church. According to the Buzandaran Patmutʻiwnkʻ and Movses Khorenatsi, in 373 Pap invited Nerses to his table under the pretence of seeking reconciliation, then poisoned him. According to another theory, Nerses died of an illness of the lungs that he had contracted early in his life. Pap appointed Nerses's successor without the approval of Caesarea, which refused to recognize the bishop's authority.

== Nerses's vision ==
In medieval Armenia, a legend about a prophetic vision supposedly seen by Nerses in his dying moments gained widespread popularity and underwent several transformations over the centuries. Nerses's legendary vision is not mentioned by the main classical sources on Nerses's life—Buzandaran Patmutʻiwnkʻ and the histories of Ghazar Parpetsi and Movses Khorenatsi—although the Buzandaran and Parpetsi do write that Nerses cursed the Arsacids, causing the fall of their kingdom. The legend first appears in a tenth-century vita of Nerses attributed to Mesrop Erets ('Mesrop the Priest'), although the main version that has reached us was redacted sometime between 1099 and 1131, that is, soon after the first Crusader conquest of Jerusalem. According to this version of the legend, Nerses predicted the fall of the Arsacid and Gregorid houses, the conquest of Jerusalem by the Persians, the capture of the True Cross, and its recapture by the Byzantines; the Armenian princes will be subjugated by the Byzantines, but the latter will soon be defeated by the "nation of the archers" (later associated with the Seljuks), leading to the total ruination of Armenia and its church; these calamities will be followed by the coming of the "Franks" or "Romans" (the Crusaders), who will defeat the infidels and subject them to Roman authority, leading to the creation of a heavenly kingdom on Earth where peace, prosperity and justice will reign until the coming of the Antichrist.

== In the arts ==
Nerses is a character in the tragedy Nerses the Great, Patron of Armenia written in 1857 by the Western Armenian playwright, actor and editor, Sargis Vanandetsi, also known as Sargis Mirzayan.

== Notes ==
Preceded by Pharen I of Armenia	Catholicos of the Holy See of St. Echmiadzin and All Armenians; 353–373	Succeeded by Sahak I
