= Elias I of Armenia =

Catholicos of Armenia

Catholicos Elias I (Եղիա Ա Արճիզեցի) was the Catholicos-Patriarch of the Armenian Apostolic Church between 703 and 717.

Elias was a bishop from the area of Bznuni family lands, and came from Archesh: he became Catholicos in 703. He had good relations with the Umayyad overlords and was able to use their influence in an ongoing dispute with the Caucasian Albanians. Elias wrote to Caliph Abd al-Malik warning that Nerses was allying with the Byzantines, which led to the banishment of their rival Catholicos Nerses Bakur along with Queen Sparama.

Had he not done so, there was great danger that the Armenians would have followed the Georgians and ended up adopting Chalcedonian beliefs. Subverting Chalcedonian beliefs remained an objective of his reign.

He died in 717.

| Preceded by Sahak_III | Catholicos of the Holy See of St. Echmiadzin and All Armenians; 703–717 | Succeeded by John III the Philosopher |
