= Stephen I (Armenian catholicos) =

Catholicos of Armenia

Catholicos Stephen I (Ստեփանոս Ա Դվնեցի) was the Catholicos-Patriarch of the Armenian Apostolic Church between 788 and 790.

Stephen served for two years during one of the many tense periods of regional standoff between local Armenians and the Abbasid overlords. The capital at the time was Dvin, where Stephen is noted as being from.

| Preceded by Isaiah I | Catholicos of the Holy See of St. Echmiadzin and All Armenians; 788–790 | Succeeded by Joab I |
