= John III of Odzun =

Catholicos of Armenia

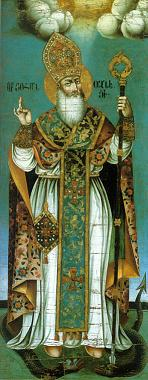
Catholicos John III the Philosopher (Hovhannes Odznetsi)

Catholicos John III the Philosopher (also John of Otzun, Hovhannes III Otznetzi, Yovhannes Odznets'i / Öjnec'i, Հովհաննես Գ Իմաստասեր) was the Catholicos-Patriarch of the Armenian Apostolic Church between 717 and 728.

== Early Life ==
Born in Odzun, his early tutor was a monk called Theodorus (Kurthenavor) who instructed him in "every art and science in Armenia". Theodorus had earlier published a treatise against the followers of John of Mairagom, who were Docetics, believing that Jesus's body was symbolic and not real (Chamach, p369). This likely influenced John's subsequent strong anti-Docetic stance and writings.

He was pious, always having sackcloth beneath his pontifical robes, but his personal appearance (fine clothes, gold dust in his beard, ointment in his hair) was impressive so as to impress his followers with the fear of God (Redgate, p 127). Chroniclers say that Caliph Umar II was so impressed with his appearance that he received gifts of gold and silver. He managed to retain good relations with the Caliph, getting tax exemptions for his clergy and the church property (Redgate, p 185).

== Works ==
His major work is The Book of Canon Law (Կանոնագիրք Հայոց, Kanonagirk Hayots, KH) which was the first collection of legislative documents which was not just assembled haphazardly but was the outcome of several councils set up to define orthodoxy. It reflected the political conflicts of his time between the Byzantines and the Arabs of the Umayyad Caliphate and the religious disputes between the Armenian church, the Greeks and several other sects which threatened the Armenian religious identity (KH, p8).

== Death ==
He died in 728 and is buried in the Church of Srbanesi which is still standing in the village of Ardvi, near his birthplace of Odzun. He is celebrated collectively alongside other patriarchs during the movable Feast of the Holy Church Fathers (on the Third Saturday of Lent in the Armenian calendar).

== Council of Dvin 720 ==
As Catholicos he used his authority to overhaul liturgical laws, author canonical and theological treatises, by calling for a national synod at Dvin in 720, later called the Fifth Council of Dvin. He said at the time

"We see lack of discipline among our people, even among the faithful of our church and the 29 leaders of the dioceses"

The Council of Dvin in 720 was attended by 30 bishops, Prince Ashot Patrik (who was possibly Ashot III Bagratuni), and a number of other nakharars.

== Coup Attempt 725 ==
Eight years into his pontificate, he was threatened by a coup from the Bagratuni family. John had to go into hiding at the Geghard Monastery, then known as the Cave Monastery. John had his own backers who were able to meet with the bishops to re-establish John's authority, and the plotters were all killed.

== Council of Manzikert 726 ==
Later, in 726 he convened the pivotal Council of Manzikert. John brought together Armenian and Syriac Orthodox bishops to try to unite their churches under a shared faith and officially break away from communion with the Greek Orthodox Church. While both traditions shared a unified view of Christ, the council established strict local guidelines, rejected certain extreme teachings such as the emergent Paulicanism, and firmly defined the independent, distinct identity of the Armenian Church.

== Literary and canonical works ==
- The Book of Canons (Kanonagirk Hayots). A work on church organisation, canon law and a legal framework for the Armenian church. It became a cornerstone or Aremrnian tradition, shaping the church for centuries.
- Dogmatic and Theological Treatises, John's polemic against what he saw as various heresies, including a discourse denouncing the Paulicians (a dualist Christian sect that had emerged in the 7th century)
- Liturgical Hymns and Discourses A collection of pastoral letters and theological discussions survive, as do some of his hymns which are still part of the Armenian official hymnbooks such as the Sharakan

Preceded by Elias I	Catholicos of the Holy See of St. Echmiadzin and All Armenians; 717–728	Succeeded by David I
