= Yeghishe I =

Catholicos of All Armenians

Yeghishe I also known as Yeghishe I Rshtunetsi (Armenian: Եղիշե Ա Ռշտունեցի) (birthday unknown, born in Rshtunik, Armenia – died 946, Aghtamar, Armenia) was the Catholicos of All Armenians in 941–946. Yeghishe I succeeded his brother Catholicos Theodore I. Ruled the Church from Aghtamar, at the time – the Holy See of the Armenian Apostolic Church. Yeghishe Rshtunetsi was the Bishop of Rshtunik and after the death of Theodore I was elected Catholicos by the initiative of the King of Vaspurakan.

Preceded by Theodore I	Catholicos of All Armenians; 941–946	Succeeded by Ananias I
