= Hovhannes Draskhanakerttsi =

Armenian chronicler and historian

Hovhannes Draskhanakerttsi (Armenian: Յովհաննէս Դրասխանակերտցի, John of Drasxanakert, various spellings exist), also called John V the Historian, was Catholicos of Armenia from 897 to 925, and a noted chronicler and historian. He is known for his History of Armenia. He is also the author of a list of Armenian Catholicoi titled Shar Hayrapetatsʻn Hayotsʻ.

What little is known about Catholicos Hovhannes's life comes from his own written works. He gives his own birthplace as Draskhkert (Draskhanakert), which has been variously identified with modern Ashtarak or placed near the historical canton of Shirak in Ayrarat province (later medieval Armenian historians claimed he was from Garni or Dvin). He was related to his predecessor as catholicos, Mashtots I, under whom he studied.

Hovhannes's pontificate coincided with the reigns of Bagratid kings of Armenia Smbat I and Ashot II the Iron, who fought against Arab domination of Armenia. The Catholicos played an important role in the consolidation of Bagratid Armenia. He often tried to play the role of peacemaker between Ashot II and his rebellious vassals and frequently went on diplomatic missions to Armenia's neighbors.

After returning the Catholicosate to Dvin since it had been reclaimed from the Arabs, he moved it again to Vaspurakan around 924, fleeing the Sajid army. There he spent the last years of his life. According to local traditions, Hovhannes was buried in Vaspurakan at either Dzoroy Vank or in the monastery of Akhtamar.

Preceded by Mashdotz I	Catholicos of the Holy See of St. Echmiadzin and All Armenians; 898–929	Succeeded by Stephen II of Armenia
