= Brkisho of Armenia =

- Occupation: Bishop of Armenia
- Years active: 429-432
- Predecessor: Surmak
- Successor: Samuel of Armenia

Brkisho or Brkisho "The Syrian" (Armenian:Բրքիշո or Բրքիշո Ասորի) was a catholicos of the Armenian Apostolic Church of Assyrian origin, from 429 to 432.

== Life ==
Bahram V appointed Brkisho, a Syrian. Brkisho arrived with unsuitable companions, including female housekeepers, and for three years led an intemperate life full of excesses, plundering the properties of dying bishops. Unable to endure him, the nobles again turned to Bahram, requesting that he replace Brkisho with someone from their own faith.
