= Khachig I of Armenia =

Catholicos Khachik I (Armenian: Խաչիկ Ա. Արշարունի) was the Catholicos of the Armenian Apostolic Church between 973 and 992.

After a one-year vacancy due to a confusing period where there were two rival Catholicoi, King Ashot III "the Merciful" called an assembly to pick a new Catholicos. Khachik, a relative of the Catholicos Ananias was selected and was able to settle the problems which had arisen from the dueling Catholicoi and the schism it caused.

He appointed bishops in the eastern regions of the Byzantine Empire, in Antioch, Tarsus, Isauria and elsewhere, where large Armenian communities had emerged. He was engaged in church construction, built three Catholic churches in Argina, established a library. Sargis A Sevantsi succeeded him on the Catholicosic throne.

Preceded by Stephen III of Armenia	Catholicos of the Holy See of St. Echmiadzin and All Armenians; 973–992	Succeeded by Sarkis I of Armenia
