= John of Bagaran =

Armenian anti-Catholicos 609-611

John of Bagaran (Old Armenian: Յովհաննէս Բագարանցի, romanized: Yovhannēs Bagarants‘i; died in 611) was an anti-Catholicos installed by the Byzantines in opposition to the Armenian catholicos Abraham I from 609 to 611.

== Background ==
John came from Bagaran, in the historic Armenian province of Ayrarat. At the end of the Byzantine-Persian War (572–591), Emperor Maurice (582–602) conquered western Armenia and wanted to support the pro-Chalcedonian faction of the local Armenian Church to cement his authority. In 593, he summoned a council of western Armenian bishops to appear at Theodosiopolis and they proclaimed full allegiance to the Chalcedonian Definition. This caused a 15 year theological dispute with the Armenian Church under Moses II and Abraham I who rejected the Chalcedonian Definition in favor of a Miaphysite position.

== Rise to power ==
Around 609, in response to Abraham expelling the pro-Chalcedonian faction, the Byzantines called another council at Constantinople to try and settle the ecclesiastical dispute. Abraham sent only a token delegation of two monks who were outnumbered by 19 pro-Greek Armenian bishops who predictably ended up agreeing to the imperial position. The Byzantines formally freed these bishops from Abraham's authority. Bishop Theodore of Karin is named as the person who nominated John, who was then set up as a rival Patriarch (an anti-Catholicos) based at Avan (now within the city limits of Yerevan, Armenia).

== As anti-Catholicos ==
To celebrate his enthronement John built a large Cathedral at Avan, only about 40km away from Abraham's base at Dvin, but still in the Byzantine controlled sector. Its size and splendour showed that John had serious imperial backing. It remained standing for 1000 years until the 1679 earthquake.

John further legitimized his authority by acquiring the sacred vessels of the original Armenian Church, which had been sent to Karin for safekeeping. The pro-Byzantine faction in Karin gave the vessels to John to legitimize his patriarchy.

Traditional chroniclers tend to see him as an imperial puppet, but he seems to have had considerable support at the local level.

== Fall ==
As early as 607 there is documentation of the defection of five bishops from the border region of Western Armenia where the Byzantines were strongest. Also, the head of the cathedral at Vagharshapat (Etchmiadzin) the historical heart of the Armenian Church, defected back to Abraham at Dvin. His patriarchate collapsed around 610 with the rise of Khosrow II, whose general Ashot Bagratuni conquered Avan, captured John, and converted John's cathedral into a monastery. John became a political prisoner. He was sent to Ahmatan (i.e Ecbatana, modern Hamadan) where he remained in exile for until his death in 611. His body was brought back to Avan for burial.
