= Ukhtanes of Sebastia =

Ukhtanes of Sebastia (Armenian: Ուխտանես Սեբաստացի, Ukhtanes Sebastatsi; c. 935–1000) was an Armenian historian and prelate.

Educated at the Monastery of Narek under the tutelage of its founder Anania, he eventually attained to the bishopric of Sebastia (c. 970-85) and probably also of Urha (post-985). Ukhtanes is principally known for his History in Three Parts, which consists of History of the Patriarchs and Kings of Armenia, History of the Severance of the Georgians and Armenians, and On the Baptism of the Nation Called Tzad.
