= Second Council of Dvin =

- Date: 554
- Accepted by: Armenian Apostolic Church
- Previous council: First Council of Dvin
- Next council: Third Council of Dvin
- Convoked by: Nerses II of Bagrevand
- Location: Dvin

The Second Council of Dvin was a church Synod or Church Council held in 554 in the city of Dvin (then in Sasanian Armenia). However, despite the convocation, the response from the bishops was inadequate and the synod failed to materialise. The synod did not meet at Dvin until 21st March, the Palm Sunday of 555, with 18 bishops attending.

The Second Council of Dvin was called by Catholicos Nerses II of Bagrevand, and it was in this council that the bishops declined to accept the canons of Chalcedon. This was significant as it was the moment where the Armenian Church formally rejected the dyophysite formula that had been adopted by some bishops at the Council of Chalcedon. This decision was made because of the Armenians' observation that the decrees of Chalcedon had caused the doctrine of Nestorius to spread.

== Impact of the Council ==
The rejection of the Chalcedonian definition further cemented the schism between the Armenian Apostolic Church (and the Oriental Orthodox communion at large) and the Patriarchate of Constantinople (which, at the time, was in communion with Rome).

The Council adopted 87 canons and marks the beginning of the Armenian Church Calendar. It also established various administration and conduct rules and regulations for members of the Armenian Church.

== See also ==
- First Council of Dvin (506)
- Third Council of Dvin (607)
- Fourth Council of Dvin (648)
- Fifth Council of Dvin (720)
