= Narek =

Narek (Armenian: Նարեկ), alternatively Nareg in Western Armenian, is an Armenian given name. It may refer to:

== People ==
- St. Gregory of Narek, knowns also as Grigor Narekatsi (951–1003), Armenian monk, poet, philosopher, theologian, Doctor of the church
  - Narek, the name commonly given to the "Book of Lamentations" by Gregory of Narek
- Narek (given name), an Armenian given name

== Places ==
- Narek, Ararat, a village in Ararat province, Armenia
- Nareg Schools, a series of Armenian Cypriot schools
  - Nicosia Armenian school
  - Larnaca Armenian school
  - Limassol Armenian school
- Narekavank, a tenth-century Armenian monastery in present-day Yemişlik, Turkey

== See also ==
- Narekan or Nukeh, a village in Howmeh Rural District, Semnan Province, Iran
