= Gregory of Narek =

Armenian monk and mystical poet (c. 950 – 1003/1011)

Saint Gregory of Narek Գրիգոր Նարեկացի
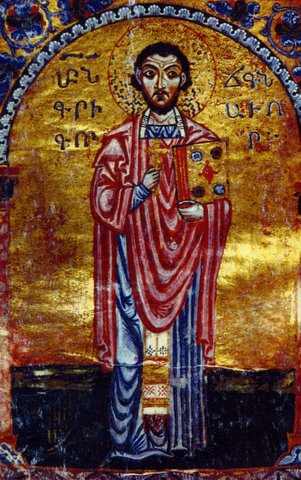
- Portrait of Gregory from an 1173 manuscript from Cilician Armenia (Note: Ms. 1568, kept at the Matenadaran, in Yerevan, Armenia. Grigor Mlitchetsi created it at the monastery of Skevra, near Lambron, in the Armenian Kingdom of Cilicia, on the request of Archbishop Nerses of Lambron (Lambronatsi). The Armenian text reads ՍԲՆ ԳՐԻԳՈՐ ՃԳՆԱՒՈՐ, i.e., "St. Gregory the Monk".)

Doctor of the Church
- Born: c. 945–951
- Residence: Narek Monastery, Kingdom of Vaspurakan
- Died: c. 1003–1011 (aged ≈60)
- Venerated in: Armenian Apostolic Church; Catholic Church
- Major shrine: Chapel-Mausoleum at Narek Monastery
- Feast: October (Armenian Apostolic Church: Holy Translators Day, a moveable feast); 27 February (Catholic Church)
- Influences: Neoplatonism, Pseudo-Dionysius the Areopagite
- Influenced: All Armenian literature, especially verse: Nerses Shnorhali, Sayat-Nova, Yeghishe Charents
- Major works: Book of Lamentations (Narek)

Grigor Narekatsi (Note: Also transliterated as Narekac'i. Western Armenian: Krikor Naregatsi.) (Armenian: Գրիգոր Նարեկացի; anglicized as Gregory of Narek; (Note: Latinized: Gregorius Narecensis; Italian: Gregorio di Narek) c. 950 – 1003/1011) was an Armenian mystical and lyrical poet, monk, and theologian. He is venerated as a saint in the Armenian Apostolic and Catholic Churches and was declared a Doctor of the Church by Pope Francis in 2015.

The son of a bishop, Gregory was educated, ordained, and later stationed at Narekavank on the southern shores of Lake Van (modern Turkey). Scholars consider Gregory the most beloved and significant theological and literary figure of the Armenian religious tradition.

He is best known for his Book of Lamentations, a significant piece of mystical literature which serves as a confessional prayer book in many Armenian religious households. His works have inspired many Armenian literary figures and influenced Armenian literature throughout the ages.

== Life and background ==
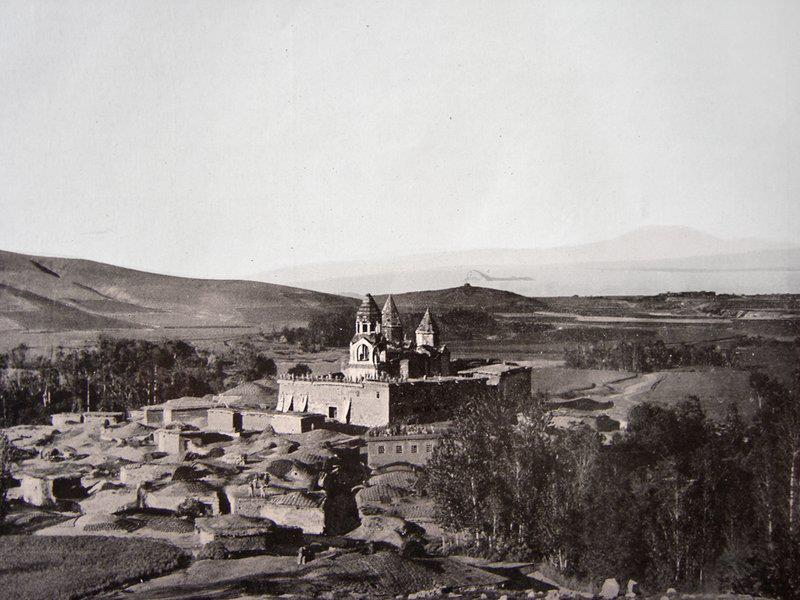
Gregory was based throughout his life at the monastery of Narek (Narekavank), seen here circa 1900. His chapel-mausoleum was located inside the monastery walls before it was destroyed in the mid-20th century.

Scholars place Gregory's birth and death dates circa 945–951 and 1003 or 1010–11, respectively. (Note: His birth has been placed in the "middle of the tenth century", "the second half of 940s", 945, c. 945, c. 950, c. 951, and his death date in 1003, c. 1003, 1003 or 1011, "probably in 1010". Hrachia Acharian suggested that he lived 53 years.) He lived in the Kingdom of Vaspurakan, a medieval Armenian kingdom, which is "notable for the high cultural level that it achieved." Vaspurakan, centered around Lake Van, is a region described by Richard Hovannisian as "the cradle of Armenian civilization".

Little is known about his life. He was born in a village on the southern shores of Lake Van, in what is now eastern Turkey, to Khosrov Andzevatsi, a relative of the Artsruni royal family. His mother died when he was little. Khosrov was ordained a bishop after being widowed and was appointed primate of the diocese of Andzevatsik. His father was suspected of pro-Byzantine Chalcedonian beliefs, a doctrine not accepted by the Armenian Apostolic Church, and was eventually excommunicated by Catholicos Anania Mokatsi for undermining the Armenian Church with his interpretation of the rank of Catholicos, the highest rank in Armenian church clergy, as being equivalent to that of a bishop, a lower rank in Christian churches, based on the works of Pseudo-Dionysius the Areopagite, a fifth-century Greek Christian theologian and mysticist. Grigor and his elder brother Hovhannes were sent to the Narekavank (lit. the monastery of Narek), where he was given religious education by Anania Narekatsi (Ananias of Narek). The latter was his maternal great-uncle, a celebrated scholar and the monastery's founder. Being raised in an intellectual and religious fervor, Grigor was ordained priest in 977 and taught others theology at the monastery school until his death.

Whether Gregory led a secluded life has become a debate among Armenian scholars. Both literary critic Arshag Chobanian and scholar Manuk Abeghian believe he did. In contrast, literary critic Hrant Tamrazyan argued that Gregory was very well aware of the secular world and his time, had a deep knowledge of both peasants and princes and the complexities of the world. Tamrazyan believes he could not have lived solely on literary ecstasy.

Gregory was buried inside the walls of the monastery of Narek. A rectangular-shaped chapel-mausoleum was built on his tomb, which survived until the mid-20th century, when the monastery, abandoned in the aftermath of the Armenian genocide, was destroyed by the Turkish authorities, and later replaced with a mosque.

== Works ==
=== Book of Lamentations (Narek) ===
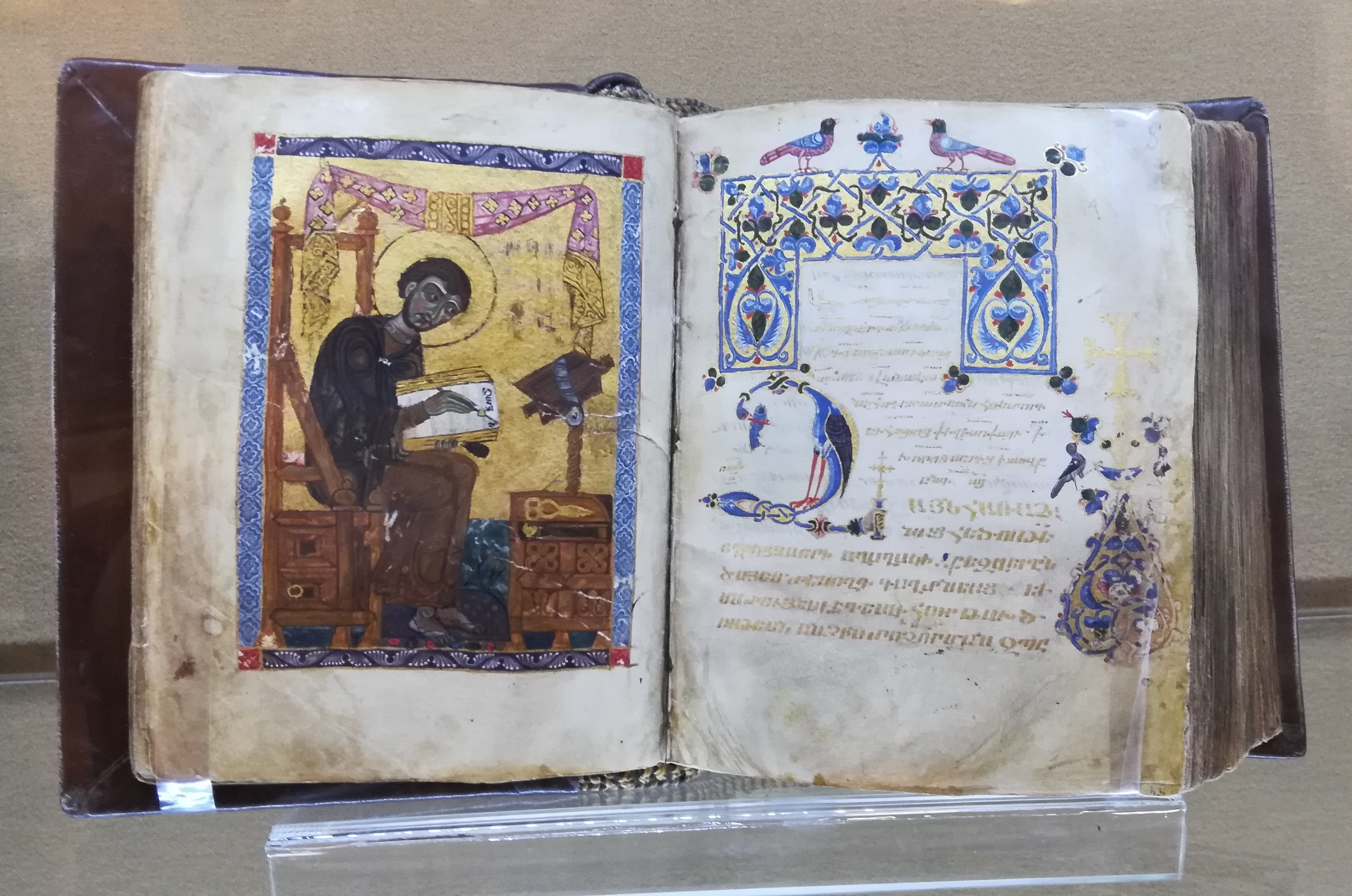
A 1173 manuscript of the Book of Lamentations

The Book of Lamentations (Classical Armenian: Մատեան ողբերգութեան, Matean oghbergut'ean) is widely considered Gregory's masterpiece. It is often simply called Narek (Նարեկ). Completed towards the end of his life, c. 1002–03, the work has been described as a monologue, a personal lyric and confessional poem, mystical and meditative. It comprises 95 chapters and over 10,000 lines. Almost all chapters (except two) are titled "Words unto God from the Depths of My Heart". The chapters, which are prayers or elegies, vary in length, but all address God. The central theme is the metaphysical and existential conflict between Gregory's desire to be perfect, as taught by Jesus, and his realization that it is impossible and between the divine grace and his sense of one's unworthiness to receive that grace. However, the love and mercy of God's all-embracing, all-forgiving, and amazing grace compensate for man's unworthiness.

The book is considered a masterpiece of Christian spiritual literature. Helen C. Evans described it as "one of the world's great mystical poems." It has been described by Agop Jack Hacikyan et al. as the "most beloved work of Armenian literature." It has been historically kept in Armenian homes. Scholars have described its popularity among Armenians as second to the Bible. (Note: Agop Jack Hacikyan et al.: "it is accorded an importance second only to that of the Bible itself."; Vahan Kurkjian: "Narek, the Book of Prayer, was once regarded with veneration but little short of that accorded to the Bible itself."; Vrej Nersessian: "After the Bible and the Book of Lamentations (Narek) of Grigor Narekatsi, 'Jesus the Son' was the most widely read book among the Armenians..."; Robert W. Thomson: "Indeed, this book is often known simply as 'Narek', and it traditionally held a place in the Armenian household hardly less honourable than that of the Bible."; Armenian Catholic independent researcher and writer Nareg Seferian said, describing it as "a mystical prayer book," only "second to the Bible as a holy work.") For centuries, Armenians have treasured the book as an enchanted treasure and have attributed to it miraculous powers. For instance, one passage has been read to the ill expecting a cure. Malachia Ormanian, scholar and Patriarch of Constantinople, wrote that Narek "written in a florid and sublime style, is regarded as a potent talisman against all kinds of dangers." In the 21st century, Dr. Armen Nersisyan, a professor of psychiatry, promotes the reading of the book with faith as a means of healing body and mind.

The book's first publication was attempted by Voskan Yerevantsi in Marseille, France, in 1673, but was censored by the Vatican. While the first complete commentary was published in Constantinople in 1745. The work has been translated into English, Russian, French, Arabic, Persian, Lithuanian, Latvian, Estonian. There are three English translations of the book, with the first one appearing in 1977.

=== Commentary on the Song of Songs ===
Gregory's second most known extant work is a commentary on the Song of Songs (Մեկնութիւն երգոց երգոյն Սողոմոնի, Meknut'iun ergots' ergoyn Soghomoni), written in 977, the year he was ordained a priest. The commentary was written at the behest of prince Gurgen-Khachik Artsruni of Vaspurakan. Gregory makes frequent use of St. Gregory of Nyssa's Letters on the Song of Songs. The commentary contains explicit condemnation of marriage and sexuality practices by Tondrakians, an Armenian Christian sect named as heretics by the Armenian Apostolic Church. Gregory may have been commissioned to counter these heretical teachings. Armenian author Ara Baliozian describes the commentary as a prose masterpiece.

=== Other works ===
There is also a single extant manuscript of a commentary by Gregory on chapters 38 and 39 of the Book of Job. Gregory also wrote hymns, panegyrics on various holy figures, homilies, numerous chants and prayers that are still sung today in Armenian churches (example: Havun Havun). Scholars have noted that Gregory often departs from the standards of the Armenian and Greek traditions of panegyrics and encomia and innovates in interesting and distinctive ways. Of particular importance are his two recensions of the encomium on the Holy Virgin, in which he affirms the doctrines of Mary's bodily Assumption (verap'okhumn), perpetual virginity, and perhaps the Immaculate Conception.

The encomium on the Holy Virgin was written as part of a triptych requested by the bishop Step'anos of Mokk'. The other two panegyrics forming this set are the History of the Holy Cross of Aparank, which commemorates the donation of a relic of the True Cross to the monastery of Aparank' by the Byzantine emperors Basil II and Constantine VIII, and the Encomium on the Holy Cross. By focusing on the cross, both of these panegyrics counter Tondrakian rejection of veneration of the cross and other material objects. Here again, as in the rest of Gregory's corpus, the saint defends orthodoxy against the Tondrakians and other heretical movements. Gregory also wrote a panegyric on St. Jacob of Nisibis, a fourth-century Syriac bishop who has been and remains today highly esteemed among Armenians. Gregory also has an encomium on the Holy Apostles.

Gregory also authored around two dozen tagher (lays or odes), which are the first documented religious poems in Armenian literature, and spiritual songs called gandz, both in verse and prose. Gregory also composed music for his odes, but they are not considered sharakans (chants).

Many of the festal odes and litanies as well as the panegyrics have been translated to English and annotated by Abraham Terian.

== Outlook and philosophy ==
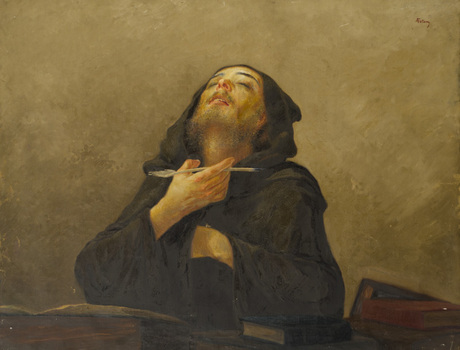
Grigor Narekatsi by Arshak Fetvadjian (1863–1947).

The central idea of Gregory's philosophy is eternal salvation relying solely upon faith and divine grace, and not necessarily upon the institutional church, in which his views are similar to those of the 16th century Protestant Reformation. This interpretation of Gregory as a precursor of Protestantism has more recently been challenged. Gregory may have been suspected of heresy and being sympathetic to the Paulicians and Tondrakians—two major sects in medieval Armenia. He notably wrote a treatise against the Tondrakians in the 980s, possibly to clear himself of accusations of being sympathetic to their movement. In the treatise, he states some of his theological views. Although Gregory does not mention the Tondrakians in the Book of Lamentations, some scholars have interpreted certain chapters as containing anti-Tondrakian elements. Other scholars have pointed out that the Book of Lamentations is dominated by the theme of the centrality of the sacraments, especially baptism, reconciliation, and the Eucharist, and thus directly opposes Tondrakian deprecation of the sacraments. In his struggle against the antinomian Tondrakians, Gregory followed his predecessor at the monastery of Narek—his great-uncle Anania, who was condemned for his alleged Tondrakian beliefs.

According to Ara Baliozian, Gregory broke from Hellenistic thought, which was dominant among the Armenian intellectual elite since the 5th-century golden age. He was instead profoundly influenced by Neoplatonism. In fact, the Narek school was instrumental in instilling Christian Neoplatonism in Armenian theology, particularly concepts such as divinization, the attainment of the power of spiritual vision or discernment through penitential purification of the inner and outer man, and a symbolic exegetical methodology. He may have been influenced by Pseudo-Dionysius the Areopagite, a pivotal author in Christian Neoplatonism, although this view has been challenged. Vache Nalbandian argued that Gregory's outlook is essentially anti-feudal and humanistic.

The tone of the Book of Lamentations has been compared to that of Confessions by Augustine of Hippo. Some scholars have compared Gregory's worldview, and philosophy to those of later Sufi mystic poets Rumi and Yunus Emre, and 19th century Russian writers Fyodor Dostoevsky and A. K. Tolstoy. Michael Papazian, a scholar of Gregory, opined that he is "what you'd get if you crossed Augustine and James Joyce. But his spirituality is also infused with the simple piety of the Desert Fathers; and, although he lived before him, there's an element of St. Francis in him, too. He's a synthesis of so many strands of Christian tradition."

== Recognition ==
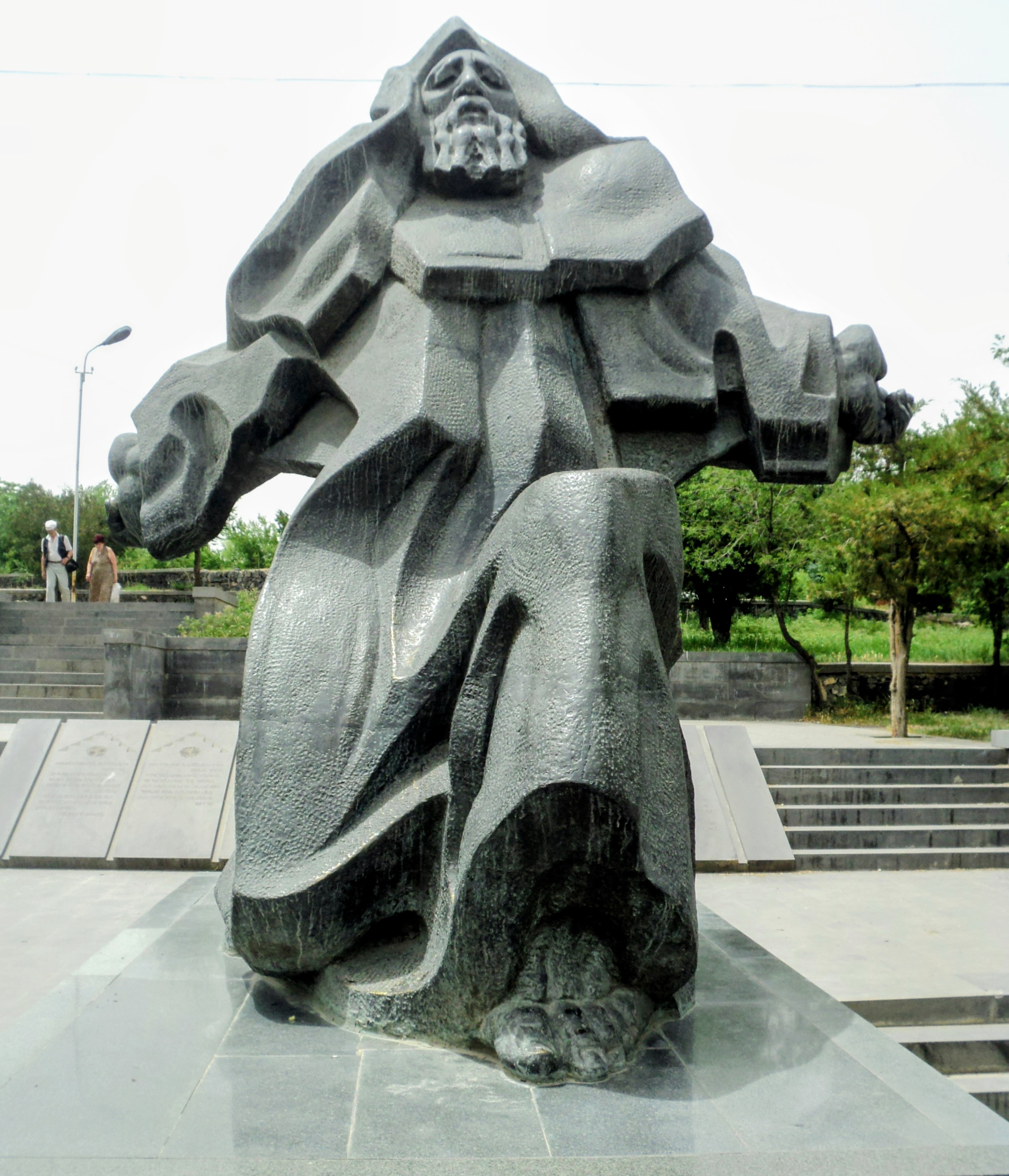
A 2002 statue of Gregory of Narek in Yerevan's Malatia-Sebastia district.

Gregory was the first major Armenian lyrical poet and is considered the most beloved person in Armenian Christianity. Robert W. Thomson described him as the "most significant poet of the whole Armenian religious tradition," while Jos Weitenberg declared him the "most outstanding theological, mystical and literary figure of Armenian culture." James R. Russell lists Gregory as one of the three visionaries of the Armenian tradition, along with Mesrop Mashtots and Yeghishe Charents.

According to Hacikyan et al. Gregory "deserves to be known as one of the great mystical writers of medieval Christendom." Vrej Nersessian considers him a "poet of world stature" in the "scope and breadth of his intellect and poetic inventiveness, and in the brooding, visionary quality of his language"—on a par with St Augustine, Dante, and Edward Taylor. Levon Zekiyan shares a similar view, describing Gregory as a unique figure not just in Armenian national and ecclesiastical culture, but also that of the entire globe. Nersessian argues that Gregory ranks with St. Augustine and Thomas à Kempis as "one the three greatest mystic writers in medieval Christendom, his monumental Lamentations joins the former's Confessions, and the latter's Imitation of Christ to form a natural trilogy." Armenian-Russian critic Karen Stepanyan writes that Gregory's genius makes him comparable with Shakespeare, Cervantes, and Dostoevsky.

Agop Jack Hacikyan et al. note that through his "lively, vibrant, and highly individual style" Gregory shaped, refined, and greatly enriched Classical Armenian through his works. According to Hrachik Mirzoyan, Gregory may have created more than 2,500 new Armenian words, including lusankar 'a portrait or image' and օդաչու, odach'u 'a person who flies, pilot'. Many of the words Gregory created are not actively used or have been replaced by other words.

=== Critique ===
France-based Western Armenian writer Shahan Shahnour has been Gregory's most prominent critic. Shahnour targeted him in his novel Retreat Without Song (Նահանջը առանց երգի, published in 1929) through one of his characters. The latter describes the Book of Lamentations as "the most immoral, unhealthy, poisonous book, a work that had debilitated the Armenians as a nation. The Armenians remain defeated in trying to emulate Grigor's miserable, maimed soul." Criticizing the book's influence on rooting the notion of fate in Armenian popular belief and for making Armenians "conventional, patient, tolerant, suffocating the freedom-loving spirit in [them]."

Paruyr Sevak opined that the Narek has not been read by Armenians as much as it has been kissed.

== Veneration ==
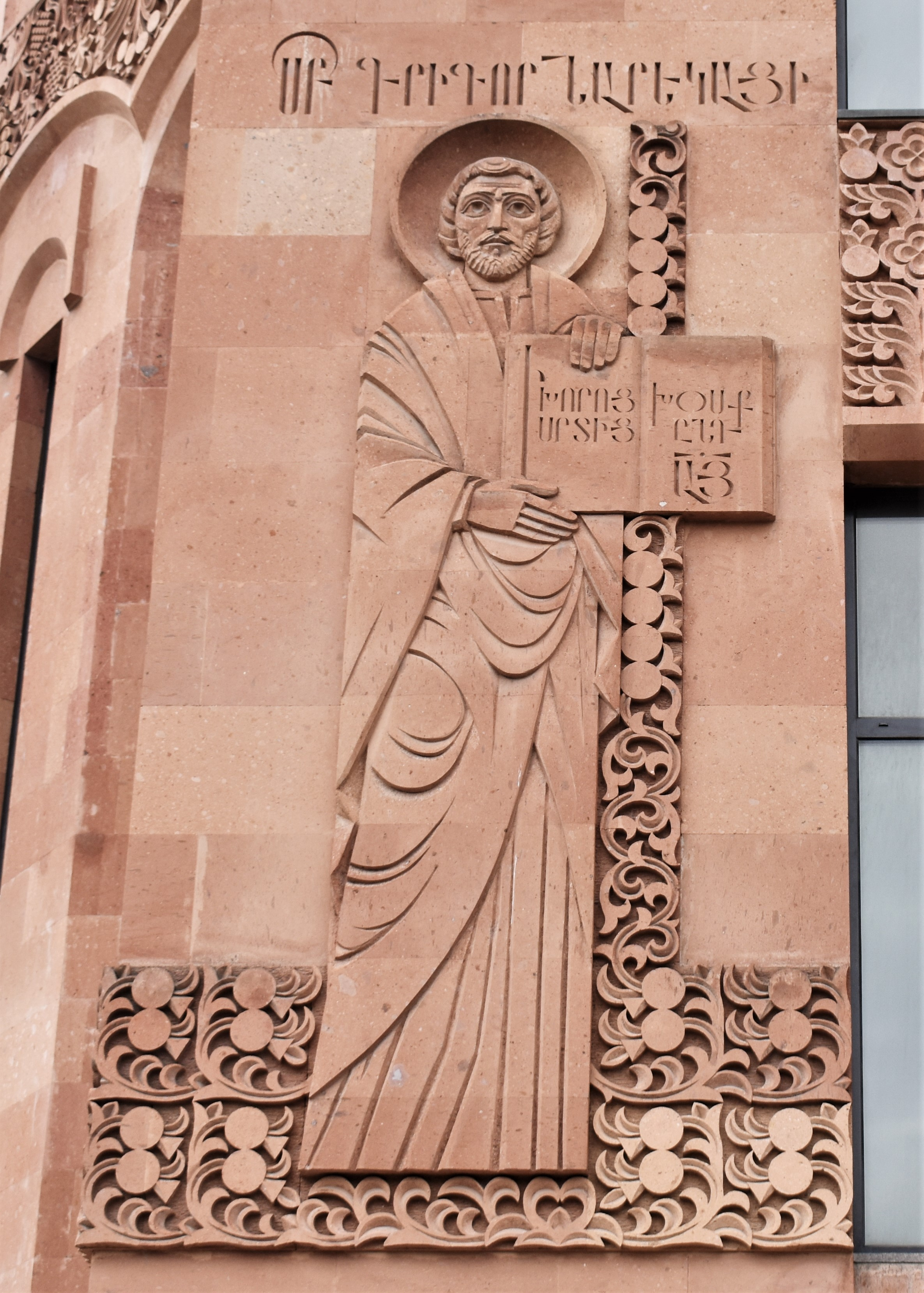
A bas-relief of Gregory of Narek on the wall of the Armenian Cathedral of Moscow. He is depicted as holding the Book of Lamentations with "Speaking with God from the Depths of the Heart" engraved on it.

=== Armenian Apostolic Church ===
The Armenian Apostolic Church celebrates his feast on the second Saturday of October, during the Feast of the Holy Translators (Սուրբ Թարգմանչաց, Surb T'argmanch'ats'). Dedicated to him, Mesrop Mashtots, Yeghishe, Movses Khorenatsi, David the Invincible, and Nerses Shnorhali, it was declared a national holiday in Armenia in 2001. The exact date of his canonization by the Armenian Church is unknown, but he was already recognized as a saint by 1173, when Nerses of Lambron (Lambronatsi) included, in the earliest extant manuscript of the Book of Lamentations, a biographical section on him entitled "The Life of the Holy Man of God Grigor Narekatsi". (Note: «Վարք սրբոյ առնն Աստուծոյ Գրիգորի Նարեկացւոյ») His contemporary, historian Ukhtanes (c. 940-1000) called Gregory a "Universal vardapet" (Tiezerakan vardapet).

In the 15th century, when the Catholicosate of Aghtamar was at the center of efforts to revive Armenian statehood, monks at the Cathedral of Aghtamar sought to construct a tradition that would link the Catholicosate to Gregory. One such tradition claimed that Gregory himself had founded the Catholicosate. In ritual books commissioned by Zakaria III and Stepanos IV Tegha, Gregory is depicted more than just equal-to-the-apostles.

A relic of Gregory is preserved at the Treasury Museum of the Mother See of Holy Etchmiadzin. Recently, it was brought out to Etchmiadzin Cathedral for the feast of the Holy Translators on 13 October 2012 and for the foot washing and oil blessing ceremony on Holy Thursday on 9 April 2020.

Several churches built in Armenia in the 21st century have been named after him. (Note: e.g. churches in Alaverdi (completed in 2001), Vanadzor (completed in 2005) and Armavir (completed in 2014)) The St. Gregory of Narek Armenian Apostolic Church in Richmond Heights, Ohio, near Cleveland, was built in 1964.

=== Catholic Church ===
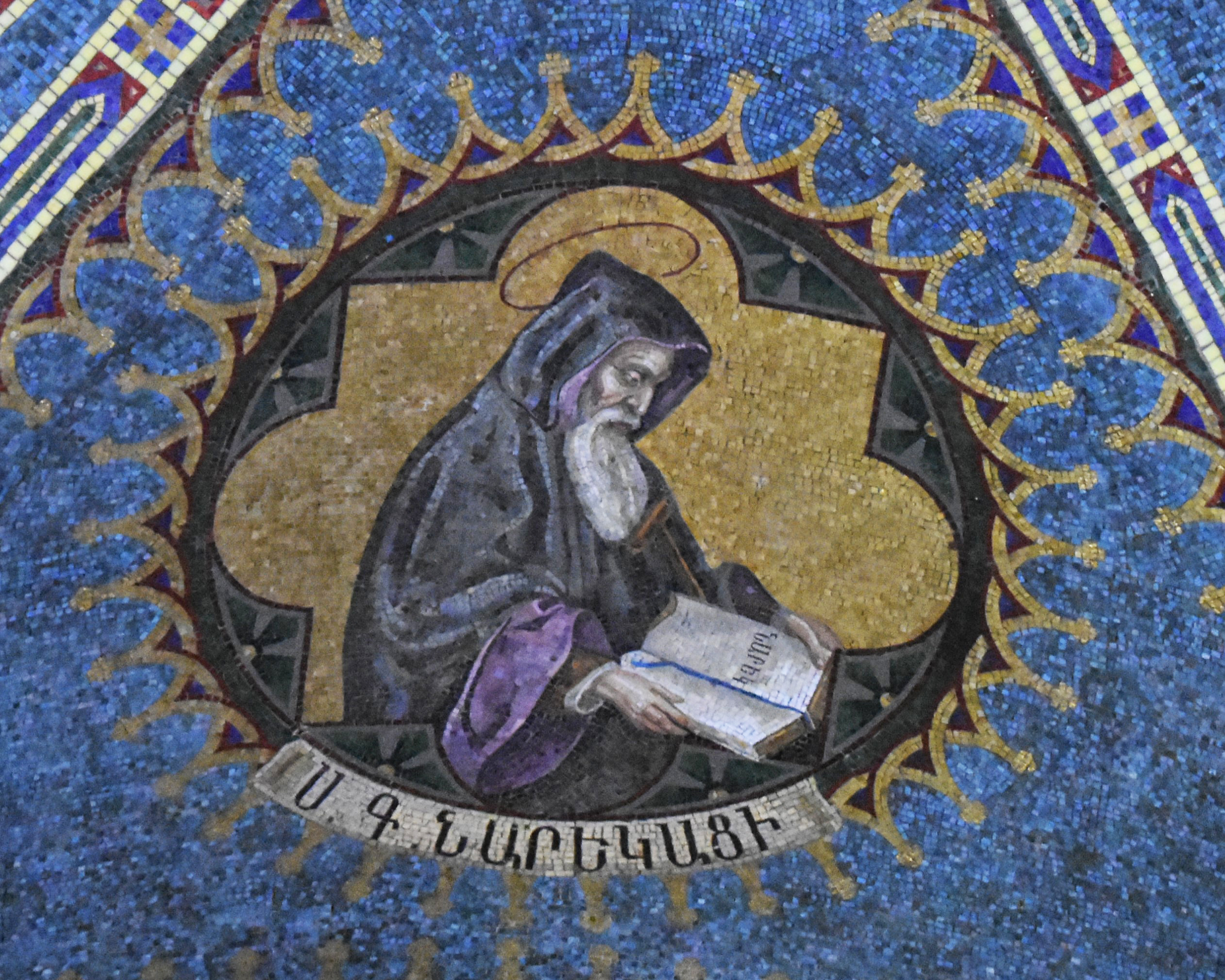
A mosaic depicting Gregory of Narek inside the church of the Mekhitarists Order's Mother House at San Lazzaro degli Armeni, Venice.

The Armenian Rite has always been practiced to some degree in the Catholic Church. For example, even though the Monastery of Narek was founded by Armenian monks fleeing religious persecution in Cappadocia under the Byzantine Emperor Romanus Lecapenus, the monks of Narek, including Gregory himself, were repeatedly accused of involvement in the Tsayt movement—a school of thought within the Armenian Apostolic Church that accepted the teachings of the Council of Chalcedon while continuing to offer the liturgy in Classical Armenian. To Armenians who viewed the Chalcedon as a contradiction of Cyril of Alexandria and therefore as heresy, the Tsayts were accused of being "Greeks but with an Armenian tongue", and even as "half, insufficient, or inadequate Armenians". Meanwhile, criticisms by Gregory of the Tondrakians—a Paulician breakaway sect regarded by both Oriental Orthodox and Chalcedonian Churches as heretics—have survived, but no similar criticisms of the Council of Chalcedon, the papacy, or of the Tsayts are known to exist by his hand.

This would become important centuries later, when the Mekhitarist Order was founded by Mkhitar Sebastatsi as part of a wider movement within the Armenian Apostolic Church towards acceptance of the Council of Chalcedon and reunification with the Holy See. Encouraged by French Jesuit and Capuchin missionaries in the Ottoman Empire, this movement eventually resulted in both the 1707 martyrdom of Gomidas Keumurdjian and the 1742 formation of the Patriarchate of Cilicia to head the Armenian Catholic Church. For many reasons, Gregory and Nerses Shnorhali were the only two post-Chalcedon Armenian theologians used by the Mekhitarist monks to preach reunion through their publishing apostolate based at San Lazzaro Island in Venice.

In his 1987 encyclical Redemptoris Mater, Pope John Paul II called Gregory "one of the outstanding glories of Armenia." On 18 February 1989, John Paul II established the Armenian Catholic Eparchy of Saint Gregory of Narek in Buenos Aires. John Paul II referred to him in several other addresses. Article 2678 of Catechism of the Catholic Church, promulgated by John Paul II in 1992, mentions the tradition of prayer in Gregory's works. John Paul II also described Gregory as "one of Our Lady's principal poets" and "the great doctor of the Armenian Church" in his 18 February 2001 Angelus address.

Gregory was recognized officially in the revised 2001 Roman Martyrology and its updated 2004 edition. This recognition went largely unnoticed until his declaration as a Doctor of the Church in 2015, causing some in Catholic media to state incorrectly that the declaration was an act of equipollent canonization.

==== Doctor of the Church ====
On 4 September 2014, Nerses Bedros XIX Tarmouni, the Patriarch of Cilicia in the Armenian Catholic Church, appointed Archbishop Levon Zekiyan of the Mekhitarist Order as postulator, with orders to argue for Gregory of Narek being named a Doctor of the Church. Proof was demanded from Zekiyan that the Armenian Apostolic Church has never been Monophysite and only rejected the Council of Chalcedon due to a misunderstanding over semantics.

Zekiyan's investigation and arguments were successful and, on 23 February 2015 Pope Francis declared Gregory of Narek a Doctor of the Church. On 12 April 2015, on Divine Mercy Sunday, during a Mass for the centennial of the Armenian genocide at St. Peter's Basilica, Francis officially proclaimed Gregory as Doctor of the Church in the presence of Armenian President Serzh Sargsyan, Catholicos of All Armenians Garegin II, Catholicos of Cilicia Aram I, and Armenian Catholic Patriarch Nerses Bedros XIX Tarmouni. During a Mass on 25 June 2016 in Vartanants Square in Gyumri, Francis stated that he had "wished to draw greater attention" to Gregory by making him a Doctor of the Church. In a 2023 address, Francis said of Gregory: "What is most striking about him is the universal solidarity of which he is an interpreter."

Gregory is the 36th and the first Armenian Doctor of the Church. He is also the "second saint coming out of the Eastern Church" to become a Doctor and the only Doctor "who was not in communion with the Catholic Church during his lifetime." (Note: Del Cogliano clarifies that this was facilitated by a "common declaration of faith in Christ" by Pope John Paul II and Armenian Apostolic Catholicos Karekin I which confirmed that the two churches "believe the same things about Christ, even if they express these things in different language" that has led to unfortunate divisions since the Second Council of Constantinople; "this statement effectively exonerates St. Gregory of any 'Christological' errors: even if St. Gregory was not in communion with the Catholic Church, in doctrinal matters there was complete agreement.")

Gregory's recognition as a Doctor of the Church was commemorated by the Vatican City state with a postage stamp put into circulation on 2 September 2015. On 5 April 2018, a two-meter-high bronze statue of Gregory, erected by Davit Yerevantsi, was unveiled at the Vatican Gardens by Mikayel Minasyan, Armenia's ambassador to the Holy See. The ceremony was also attended by Pope Francis, Armenian President Serzh Sargsyan, and Armenian Apostolic leaders Garegin II and Aram I. In 2021 the Congregation for Divine Worship and the Discipline of the Sacraments established an optional memorial for Gregory on 27 February on the General Roman Calendar.

== Legacy ==
A mural of Gregor Narekatsi near Saint Sarkis Cathedral, Yerevan.

=== Literary influence ===
Gregory influenced virtually all Armenian literature that came after him. Manuk Abeghian argued that his mark on Armenian Christian literature was "comparable to Homer for Greek and Dante for Italian." Grigor Magistros Pahlavuni (c. 990–1058) is considered his direct literary successor. Scholars have noted Gregory's influence on Armenian poets—medieval and modern ones alike. He inspired prominent medieval poets Hovhannes Imastaser (c. 1047–1129), Nerses Shnorhali (1102–1173) and Frik (c. 1230–1310), and in the modern period, Sayat-Nova (1712–95), Hovhannes Tumanyan (1869–1923), Misak Metsarents (1886–1908), Daniel Varoujan (1884–1915), Siamanto (1878–1915), Yeghishe Charents (1897–1937), and Paruyr Sevak (1924–1971).

Charents lauds the "hallowed brows" of Gregory and Nahapet Kuchak in his 1920 poem "I Love My Armenia" ("Yes im anush Hayastani"). In another poem, entitled "To Armenia" ("Hayastanin"), Charents lists Gregory, Nerses Shnorhali and Naghash Hovnatan as geniuses. Sevak describes the Book of Lamentations a "temple of poesy, on which the destructive action of time has had no effect."

=== Tributes ===
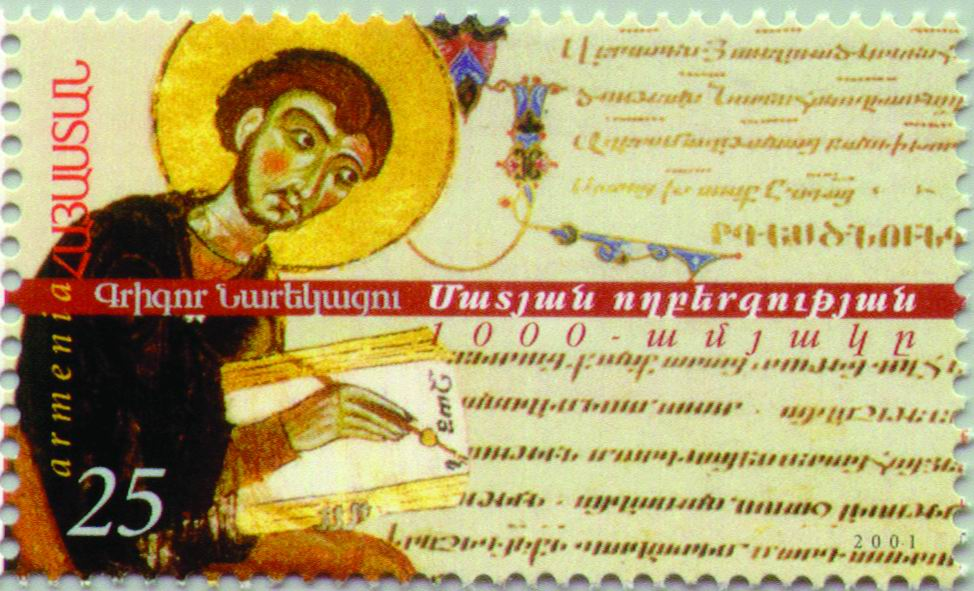
Gregory depicted on a 2001 stamp of Armenia.

Narek (Western Armenian: Nareg) is a common male first name among Armenians. It originates from the village and monastery of Narek and owns its popularity to Gregory of Narek and the Book of Lamentations, popularly known as "Narek." Hrachia Acharian did not provide an etymology for Narek, and James R. Russell noted that it has "no special meaning."

The village of Narek in Armenia's Ararat Province, founded in 1984, is named after Gregory.

The Narekatsi Professorship of Armenian Language and Culture, established in 1969, is the oldest endowed chair of the University of California, Los Angeles (UCLA). In Yerevan, a public school (established in 1967 and renamed in 1990) and a medical center (established in 2003) are named after Gregory. Gregory is depicted on a postage stamp issued by Armenia in 2001. The Naregatsi Art Institute (Narekats'i arvesti miut'yun), has its headquarters in Yerevan, Armenia (since 2004) and previously a center in Shushi, Artsakh (Nagorno-Karabakh) (since 2006).

A statue of Gregory was erected in Yerevan's Malatia-Sebastia District in 2002. A large stone resembling an old manuscript with inscribed lines and images from the Book of Lamentations was unveiled in the Narekatsi quarter of Yerevan's Avan district in 2010.

Soviet composer Alfred Schnittke composed music for the Russian translation of the Book of Lamentations in 1985 named "Concerto for mixed chorus".

== See also ==
- Doctors of the Church
- Exegesis – commentary on religious text
- Gregory the Illuminator, similarly named saint venerated by Armenian Christians
- History of the Armenian literature
- Mystical theology

== Bibliography ==
- Avagyan, Vachagan (2017). "Գրիգոր Նարեկացին Հրանտ Թամրազյանի գնահատմամբ [The evaluation of Grigor Narekatsi by Hrant Tamrazyan]" (PDF). Akunq: Collection of Scientific Articles (in Armenian). 1 (15). Yerevan State University Ijevan Branch. Archived from the original (PDF) on 28 December 2018.
- Ervine, Roberta (2007). The Blessing of Blessings: Gregory of Narek's Commentary on the Song of Songs. Cistercian Publications. ISBN 978-0-87907-215-5.
- Hacikyan, Agop Jack; Basmajian, Gabriel; Franchuk, Edward S.; Ouzounian, Nourhan (2002). "Grigor Narekatsi". The Heritage of Armenian Literature: From the sixth to the eighteenth century. Detroit: Wayne State University Press. pp. 274-279. ISBN 978-0-8143-3023-4.
- La Porta, Sergio (2016). "Monasticism and the construction of the Armenian intellectual tradition". In Murzaku, Ines Angeli (ed.). Monasticism in Eastern Europe and the Former Soviet Republics. Routledge. pp. 330–350. ISBN 978-1-317-39105-0.
- Nazaryan, Shushanik (1990). "Գրիգոր Նարեկացու պայքարը թոնդրակյան աղանդավորական շարժման դեմ [Grigor Narekatsi's struggle against the Tondrakian sect]". Etchmiadzin (in Armenian). 47 (10–12). Mother See of Holy Etchmiadzin: 72–86.
- Nersessian, Vrej (2018). "Grigor Naregatsi, mystic and poet: The soul's search for immediacy with God". Sion. 90 (7–9). Armenian Patriarchate of Jerusalem: 236–258.
- Papazian, Michael (2019). The Doctor of Mercy: The Sacred Treasures of St. Gregory of Narek. Collegeville, Minnesota: Liturgical Press. ISBN 978-0-8146-8501-3.
- Terian, Abraham (2016). The Festal Works of St. Gregory of Narek: Annotated Translation of the Odes, Litanies, and Encomia. Collegeville, Minnesota: Liturgical Press. ISBN 978-0-8146-6318-9.
- Thomson, R. W. (1983). "Gregory of Narek's 'Commentary on The Song of Songs'". The Journal of Theological Studies. 34 (2). Oxford University Press: 453–496. doi:10.1093/jts/34.2.453. JSTOR 23963468.
- Thomson, Robert W. (1997). "Armenian Literary Culture Through the Eleventh Century։ Gregory of Narek". In Hovannisian, Richard G. (ed.). The Armenian People from Ancient to Modern Times: Volume I: The Dynastic Periods: From Antiquity to the Fourteenth Century. New York: St. Martin's Press. pp. 231–232.
- Zekiyan, Levon (2015). "Գրիգոր Նարեկացի՝ տիեզերական վարդապետ" (PDF). Banber Matenadarani (in Armenian). 22: 10–23. Archived from the original (PDF) on 8 January 2022.
