= Anania Narekatsi =

- Անանիա Նարեկացի
- Born: 10th century
- Died: about 978
- Occupations: Music teacher, chronicler, theologian and philosopher
- Notable work: Book of Confession, Contradiction against Tondrakets

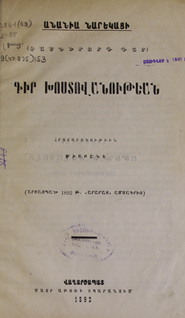
«Book of Confession (Armenian: Գիր խոստովանութեան)», 1892

Anania Narekatsi (Anane Narekatsi, 10th century – about 978, buried in the courtyard of Narekavank), chronicler, theologian, philosopher, commentator, leader of Narekavank and founder of the school. Grigor Narekatsi's relative. He was accused of whipping the representers of Tondrake as a supporter of Khosrov Andzevatsi and Hakob Syunetsi. At the request of Catholicos Ananias A. Mokatsi, in order to deny the accusations against him of being a sectarian, he wrote the "Book of Confession" (discovered and published in 1892 by G. Ter-Mkrtchyan). On the order of the same Catholicos, he authored "Contradiction against Tondrakets", where he exposed the mistakes and delusions of the Tondrakets and denounced their sect. Anania Narekatsi's "Contradiction" has not been preserved. However, Grigor Narekatsi, in his paper "For the wrong opinion about him", written to the Kjava Monastery, summarized the content of Anania Narekatsi's work and summarized the 14 points of the teachings of the Tondrakets ("Ararat", 1892, pp. 5–18).

His student Ukhtanes of Sebastia also recalls the "Havatarmat" incident (973) against Dyophysitism, which the author himself presented to Catholicos Khachig I of Arsharun.

Anania Narekatsi's works serve as a significant source for understanding the beliefs of the Tondrake people. As an educator, he emphasized the importance of a teacher's profound knowledge, prioritizing literary richness and musicality. According to Stepanos Asoghik, he was renowned for his "...many distinguished singer and literary critic...". He taught Sahak, Hovhannes, and Grigor (Narekatsi), the sons of Khosrov Andzevatsi, whose efforts ensured the preservation of the works of Anania Narekatsi and Grigor Narekatsi. Grigor Narekatsi and Ukhtanes regarded Anania Narekatsi as a "philosopher of great intellect" and a "renowned orator". Ukhtanes compiled the "History of Armenians" at the behest of Anania Narekatsi. On July 4, 980, they deliberated "mouth to mouth... for history" "at your ghetto that Akhurian will call", indicating their joint discussion and planning of both the structure and the content of the work. The initial section (A) of the narrative is dedicated to Anania Narekatsi.
