= Narekavank =

Former monastery in Gevaş, Van, Turkey

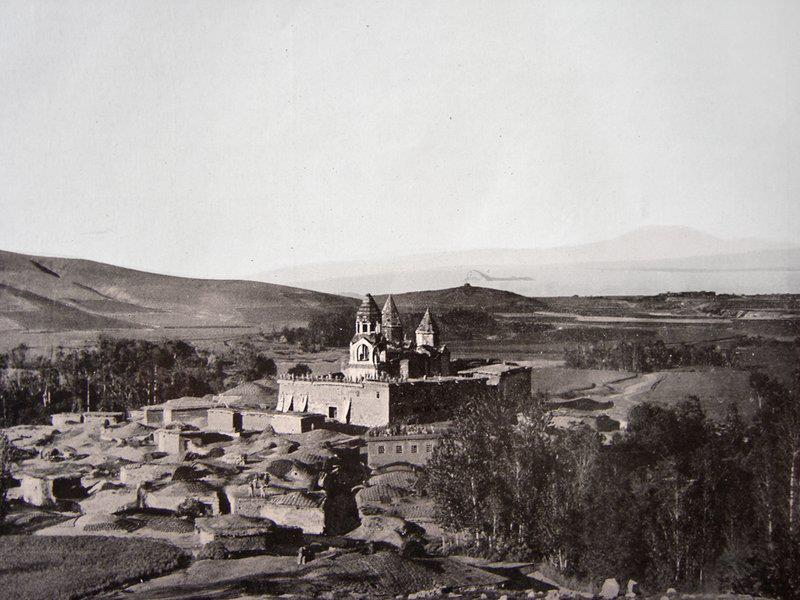
- The monastery and the village of Narek c. 1900

- Location within Turkey

Religion
- Affiliation: Armenian Apostolic Church
- Status: Demolished

Location
- Location: Yemişlik, Gevaş district, Van Province, Turkey
- Coordinates: 38.296875°N 42.928256°E

Architecture
- Style: Armenian
- Groundbreaking: 10th century

Narekavank (Armenian: Նարեկավանք, "Monastery of Narek", Western Armenian: Nareg) was a tenth-century Armenian monastery in the historic province of Vaspurakan, near the southern shores of Lake Van, in present-day Gevaş district in Van Province in eastern Turkey. The monastery was one of the most prominent in medieval Armenia and had a major school. The poet Gregory of Narek (Grigor Narekatsi) notably flourished at the monastery. It was abandoned in 1915 during the Armenian genocide, and reportedly demolished around 1951. A mosque now stands on its location.

== History ==
=== 10th-11th centuries ===
The monastery was founded during the reign of the Artsruni King Gagik I of Vaspurakan (r. 908–43) by Armenian monks who fled the Byzantine Empire due to religious persecution. In the 10th century father Ananias of Narek (Anania Narekatsi) founded a school, which became one of the most prominent centers of learning in medieval Armenia. Gregory of Narek (Grigor Narekatsi, c. 951–1003), a prominent mystical poet, studied and flourished at the monastery, making the "name of the institution immortal". To this day, the monastery is mostly associated with Gregory of Narek. Among others, the historian Ukhtanes studied at the monastery school. During this period, the monastery was among the most prominent in all of Armenia and was also a major center of manuscript production. The earliest surviving manuscript produced at the monastery is a Gospel dated 1069.

=== Modern period ===
Armenia was dominated by various foreign powers in the subsequent centuries. The Ottoman Empire gained control of the region by the 16th century. The monastery experienced a revival when in 1707 it was profoundly renovated by Minas vardapet Ghapantsi. In 1812 a bell-tower was constructed within the monastery walls. The two domes were restored in 1843 by the architect Sahrat Memarbashi and his son Movses. In 1858 the monastery was renovated by Hovhannes vardapet. Father Hovsep Rabuni commissioned a khachkar (cross stone), which was placed on the tomb of Gregory of Narek. It depicted the Mother of God carrying Jesus on her lap and Gregory on the foreground.

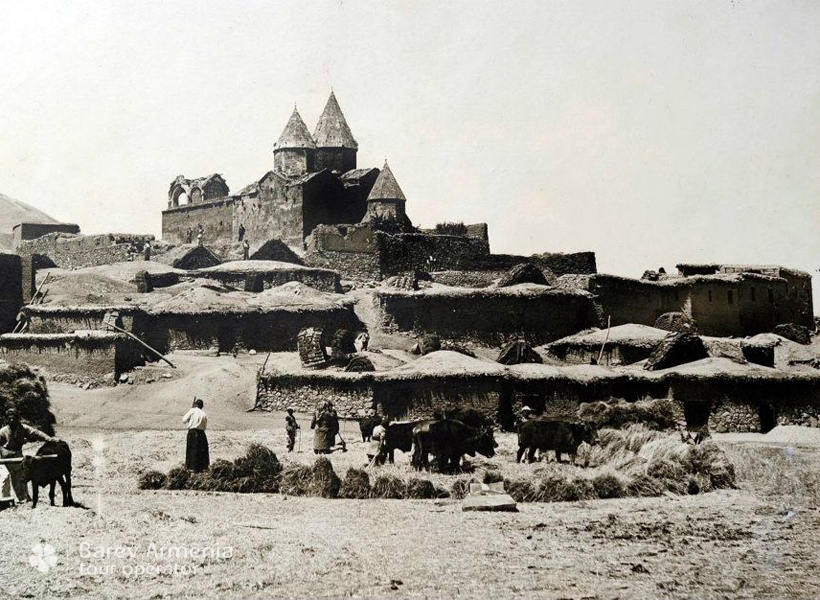
Peasants plowing under Narekavank's walls (photo by Yervand Lalayan, 1911)

In 1884 Aristakes vardapet opened a seminary at the monastery and in 1901 an orphanage with a school was founded.

In 1896, during the government-sanctioned Hamidian massacres, the monastery was attacked by Kurds who killed father Yeghishe and 12 monks.

In the 19th and early 20th centuries the monastery was visited by Western missionaries. In 1852 Reverend H. G. O. Dwight described it a "celebrated monastery". In 1853 Austen Henry Layard called Narek a "large Armenian village" and noted that the monastery is "much frequented in pilgrimage by the Christians of Wan [Van] and the surrounding country." He wrote that it was probably expanded and repaired at various periods, and "there are parts, such as the belfry, which are modern, whilst others bear evident marks of antiquity. It is a strong solid building, of the same red sand stone as the tombs of Akhlat."

In 1900 the American journal The Missionary Herald wrote that the monastery's orphanage had 25 to 30 boys, while the monastery school was "by far the largest and most advanced school in the province outside the city [of Van], this village unlike most others, having had some sort of a school for several years."

In the early 20th century the monastery was surrounded by residential houses and various buildings for economic purposes. A 1911 photo by the ethnographer Yervand Lalayan shows "peasants with oxen plowing a field directly beneath its walls." The American missionary Herbert M. Allen (1865–1911) wrote in 1903:

...the cloisters built at its base have done their utmost to destroy the significance of this singularly beautiful church, but in spite of these, the power and spirituality of the sculptured thought remain and call to mind the name of the apostle [Gregory] of Nareg, who has left the stamp of his personality on Armenian literature and character.

== Architecture ==
The monastic complex contained two churches: St. Sandukht and Surb Astvatsatsin ("Holy Mother of God"). The mausoleum of Gregory of Narek was located to the east of the St. Sandukht church. The church of Surb Astvatsatsin had a "domed hall" design, and was located south of St. Sandukht. In 1787 vardapet Barsegh built a rectangular, four-columned gavit (narthex), on the tombs of Hovhannes vardapet (the brother of Gregory) and the philosopher Ananias of Narek. In front of the gavit's western entrance a three-storey bell-tower was built in 1812.

== Destruction and ruins ==
The monastery ceased to function during the Armenian genocide of 1915 which resulted in the Armenian population of the region being exterminated. According to Sevan Nişanyan it was demolished around 1951, at the same period that an official order for the demolition of the Holy Cross Cathedral of Aghtamar was issued, which was not carried out. The village of Narek is largely Kurdish-populated and is known as Yemişlik in Turkish and Nerik (Narîk) in Kurdish.

In the early 2000s "there were still some remnants of an archway of the monastery." In October 2003, as part of the commemorations of the 1000th anniversary of Gregory of Narek, Mesrob II Mutafyan, the Armenian Patriarch of Constantinople, visited the site of the monastery. NTV said that a villager, who had turned what had survived of the monastery into a stable prevented entry and asked Mutafyan and accompanying visitors for money. Turkish gendarmes (military police) interevened and the door was opened. Mutafyan did not enter the stable and instead chatted with the villagers.

The monastery is now completely destroyed. A mosque now stands where the monastery once stood. Its surviving parts continued to be destroyed. During his visit in 1994, James R. Russell photographed a 10th century khachkar (cross stone), which was missing when he returned in 1997. He was told by local Kurds that the Turkish police destroyed it soon after his visit.

In December 2008 the Turkish-Armenian architect Zakarya Mildanoğlu announced that the Turkish government had decided to rebuild Narekavank, among some other half-ruined or destroyed churches and monasteries in eastern Turkey. In September 2010, Mildanoğlu compiled a list of around 90 Armenian churches and monasteries in the Lake Van region including Narekavank. He recommended that the Turkish government take the necessary measures to preserve them.

== See also ==
Other prominent churches in the Lake Van region:

- Holy Cross Cathedral on Aghtamar Island
- Varagavank
