= Holy Translators =

Early Armenian literary figures

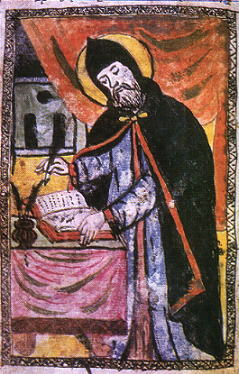

The Feast of the Holy Translators (Armenian: Սուրբ Թարգմանչաց տօն, Surb T'argmanchats ton) is dedicated to a group of literary figures, and saints of the Armenian Apostolic Church, who founded the Armenian alphabet, translated the Bible, and started a movement of writing and translating important works into Armenian language. The earliest Bible in Armenian is dated 981 (Matenadaran № 2679).

The Holy Translators are:

- Mesrop Mashtots
- Koriun, author of Life of Mashtots
- Eznik of Kolb, author of On God (1280)
- Ghazar Parpetsi, author of History of the Armenians (1200)
- Isaac of Armenia
- Gregory of Narek, author of Commentary on the Song of Songs (977) and Book of Lamentations (1002)
- Movses Khorenatsi, author of History of the Armenians (12th century)
- Yeghishe, author of History of Vardan and the Armenian War (1172)
- David the Invincible
- Nerses IV the Gracious
- Gregory the Illuminator

The translation of the Bible was finished by the Holy Translators in 425. The first words written in Armenian were the opening line of the Book of Proverbs:

Ճանաչել զիմաստութիւն եւ զխրատ, իմանալ զբանս հանճարոյ:
Čanačʿel zimastutʿiwn ew zxrat, imanal zbans hančaroy.
«To know wisdom and instruction; to perceive the words of understanding.»

— Proverbs 1:2.

The first Armenian translation of the Bible, among the world's oldest, has survived and is still used in the liturgy of the Armenian Church.

The Armenian Church remembers Holy Translators on the Feast of the Holy Translators in October. Churches of Holy Translators are established in Armenia and different diaspora communities (USA, Iran etc.).

According to Dennis Papazian, "the Holy Translators are highly revered in the Armenian church. Many of the works translated have since been lost in their Greek or Syriac original, but have been preserved in the Armenian."
