= Vardapet =

Title in the Armenian Apostolic Church

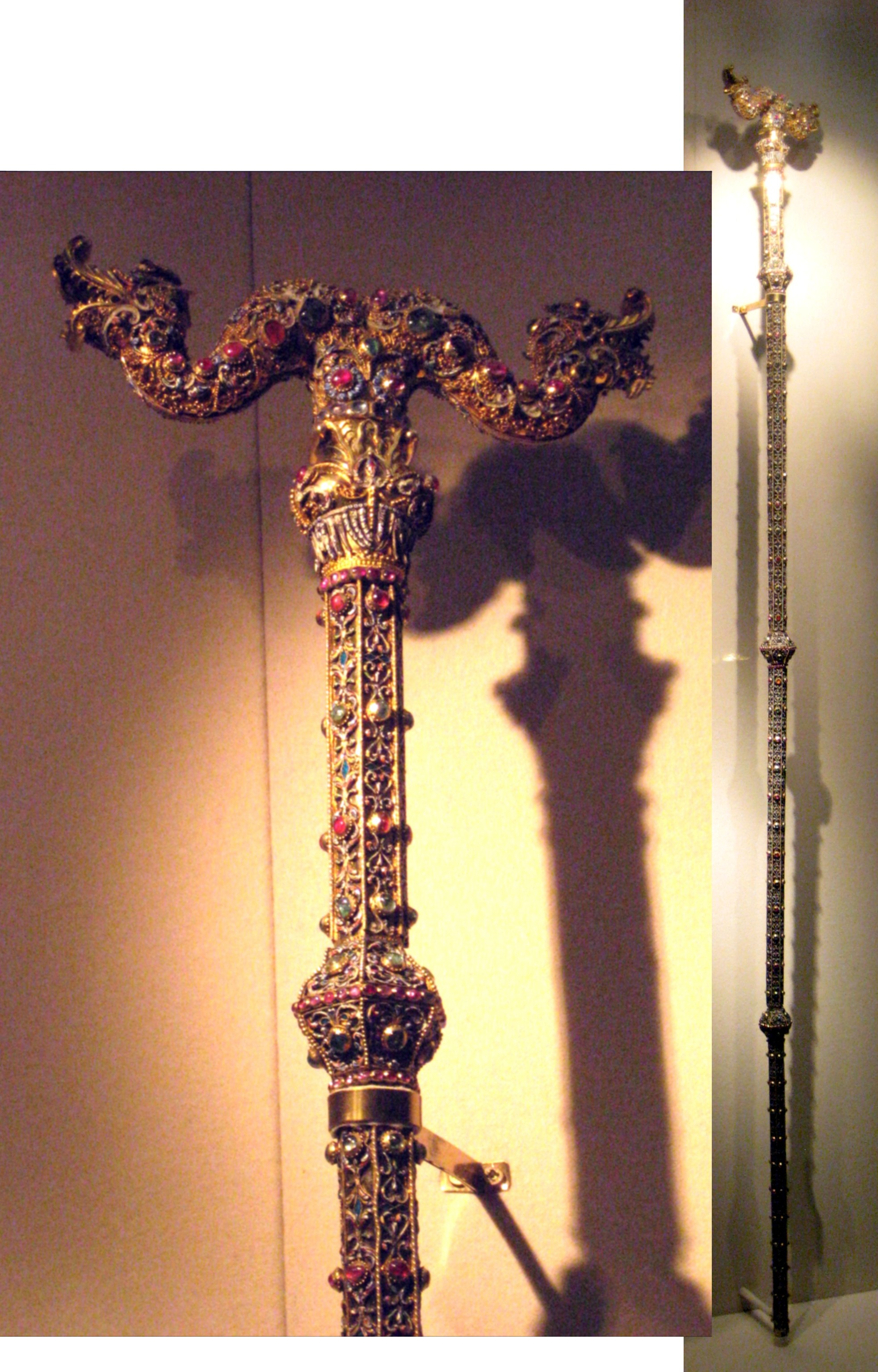
A vardapet's crozier with a double-headed serpent, first quarter of the 19th century

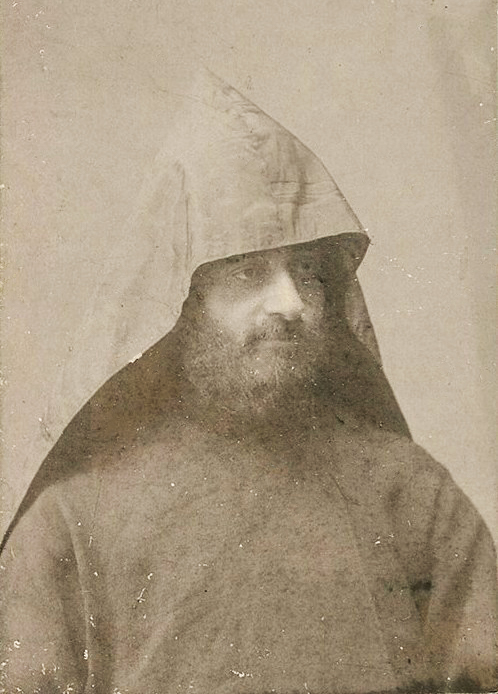
The composer Komitas, one of the most famous vardapets, in a veghar (Armenian priest's cowl)

A vardapet (Armenian: վարդապետ, Eastern Armenian: [vaɾtʰa'pεt]; Western Armenian: vartabed, [vɑɾtʰɑˈbɛd]) is a title given to highly educated hieromonks in the Armenian Apostolic Church. It has been variously translated as 'doctor', 'doctor-monk', 'archimandrite', or 'doctor of theology'.

The term originated from vardbad, a Middle Persian term, while the Parthian variant, varžapet, is retained in Armenian for "teacher". James R. Russell said that the Middle Persian form indicates that the Christian Armenian title was adopted on the model of a Sasanian Zoroastrian office. The term vardapet, which in Classical Armenian had the primary meaning of 'teacher' or 'head teacher', has been used in the Armenian Church from its earliest days. Mesrop Mashtots, the creator of the Armenian alphabet, is regarded as the first great vardapet. A vardapet has the right to interpret scripture, preach and, especially, to teach. A vardapet's staff (gavazan) is a symbol of his office. The title of vardapet requires special ordination and is not held by all high-ranking Armenian clergyman; there have been Armenian bishops and patriarchs who did not achieve the rank of vardapet.

The Armenian Church has fourteen ranks of vardapet, which are granted to celibate priests who have completed special education and presented a thesis. The first four ranks of vardapet are called masnavor vardapetut’yun or 'partial/minor vardapet-hood', while the remaining ten are called tsayraguyn vardapetut’yun or 'supreme vardapet-hood'. The ordination of new vardapets was formerly conducted by tsayraguyn vardapets, but it is now done solely by bishops. The lower ranks of vardapet are equivalent to the degree of Master of Divinity, while the rank of tsayraguyn vardapet is equivalent to the degree of Doctor of Divinity. The canons of the vardapet-hood were recorded by the medieval jurist and theologian Mkhitar Gosh, while Gregory of Tatev laid out the fourteen ranks of vardapet and the rules for their granting, which are used today by the Armenian Church. Mkhitar Gosh writes that a cleric could only receive the title of vardapet after examination by a panel of two or three vardapets. The orations presented by aspiring vardapets at the medieval University of Gladzor have been preserved in some Armenian manuscripts, which show that these orations dealt with particular philosophical and theological themes.

The term erkotasan vardapetk’ 'twelve vardapets' refers to the twelve great early Christian church leaders venerated in the Armenian Church: Hierotheos the Thesmothete, Dionysius the Areopagite, Sylvester I, Athanasius of Alexandria, Cyril of Jerusalem, Ephrem the Syrian, Basil of Caesarea, Gregory of Nyssa, Gregory of Nazianzus, Epiphanius of Salamis, John Chrysostom, and Cyril of Alexandria. A number of prominent Armenian Christian authors are grouped together under the name t’argmanich’ vardapetk’ 'translator vardapets': Mesrop Mashtots, Elishe, Movses Khorenatsi, David the Invincible, Gregory of Narek, Nerses the Gracious, John of Odzun, John of Orotan, and Gregory of Tatev.

== See also ==
- Christian monasticism
- Gregory the Illuminator, Apostle of Armenia
- Komitas Vardapet
- Mesrop Mashtots
- Oriental Orthodoxy

== Sources ==
- Pope John Paul II (3 July 2001). Address of John Paul II to the Mechitarist Order on the third centenary of their founding (Speech).
- Ghazaryan, Artashes (2002). "Vardapet". In Ayvazyan, Hovhannes (ed.). Kʻristonya Hayastan hanragitaran [Christian Armenia Encyclopedia] (PDF) (in Armenian). Yerevan: Haykakan Hanragitaran hratarakchʻutʻyun. pp. 971–972.
- Ormanian, Malachia (1955). The Church of Armenia: Her History, Doctrine, Rule, Discipline, Liturgy, Literature, and Existing Condition. London: Mowbray.
- Sanjian, Avedis K. (1991). "The Historical Setting". In Mathews, Thomas F.; Sanjian, Avedis K. (eds.). Armenian Gospel Iconography: The Tradition of the Glajor Gospel. Dunbarton Oaks Studies; 29. Washington, D.C.: Dunbarton Oaks Research Library and Collection. p. 23. ISBN 978-0-88402-183-4.
- Tamcke, Martin (2011). "Vardapet". Religion Past and Present. doi:10.1163/1877-5888_rpp_SIM_026274.
- Villari, Luigi (1906). Fire and Sword in the Caucasus. London: T. F. Unwin.
