= Narek (given name) =

Narek (Armenian: Նարեկ), or Nareg in Western Armenian, is an Armenian masculine given name, derived from the name of the village of Narek (in modern-day eastern Turkey), where the famous 10th-century Armenian monk and poet Gregory of Narek lived and wrote his Book of Lamentations, commonly known as Narek. As of 2012, it was among the top ten most common Armenian given names for males according to the Statistical Committee of Armenia. It was the second most common name given to baby boys in Armenia in 2018.

Notable people with the given name include:

- Narek Abgaryan (born 1992), Armenian boxer
- Narek Aslanyan (born 1996), Armenian footballer
- Narek Baveyan (born 1983), Armenian singer, songwriter and actor
- Narek Beglaryan (born 1985), Armenian footballer
- Narek Grigoryan (born 2001), Armenian footballer
- Nareg Guregian (born 1989), Armenian rower
- Narek Hakhnazaryan (born 1988), Armenian cellist
- Narek Margaryan (born 1983), Armenian comedian, screenwriter and television host
- Narek Sargsyan (born in 1959), Armenian politician
- Narek Seferjan (born 1974), Russian-Armenian chess grandmaster, journalist and script writer

== See also ==
- Narek (disambiguation), other uses of the term
