= Azgagrakan Handes =

Azgagrakan Handes (Armenian: Ազգագրական հանդէս, "Ethnographic Magazine") was an Armenian-language ethnological journal published between 1895 and 1916 by Yervand Lalayan. 26 volumes of the journal were published, initially in Shushi and then in Tiflis. The main topics of journal were Armenian ethnology, philology, archeology, architecture, history and art. As well as Lalayan, noted contributors included Toros Toramanian, Garegin Hovsepian, Garegin Levonyan, and others.

== See also ==
- Armenian studies

== Links ==
- An archive of the journal
