= Skevra Evangeliary =

Armenian evangeliary from the 12th century

- National Library of Poland
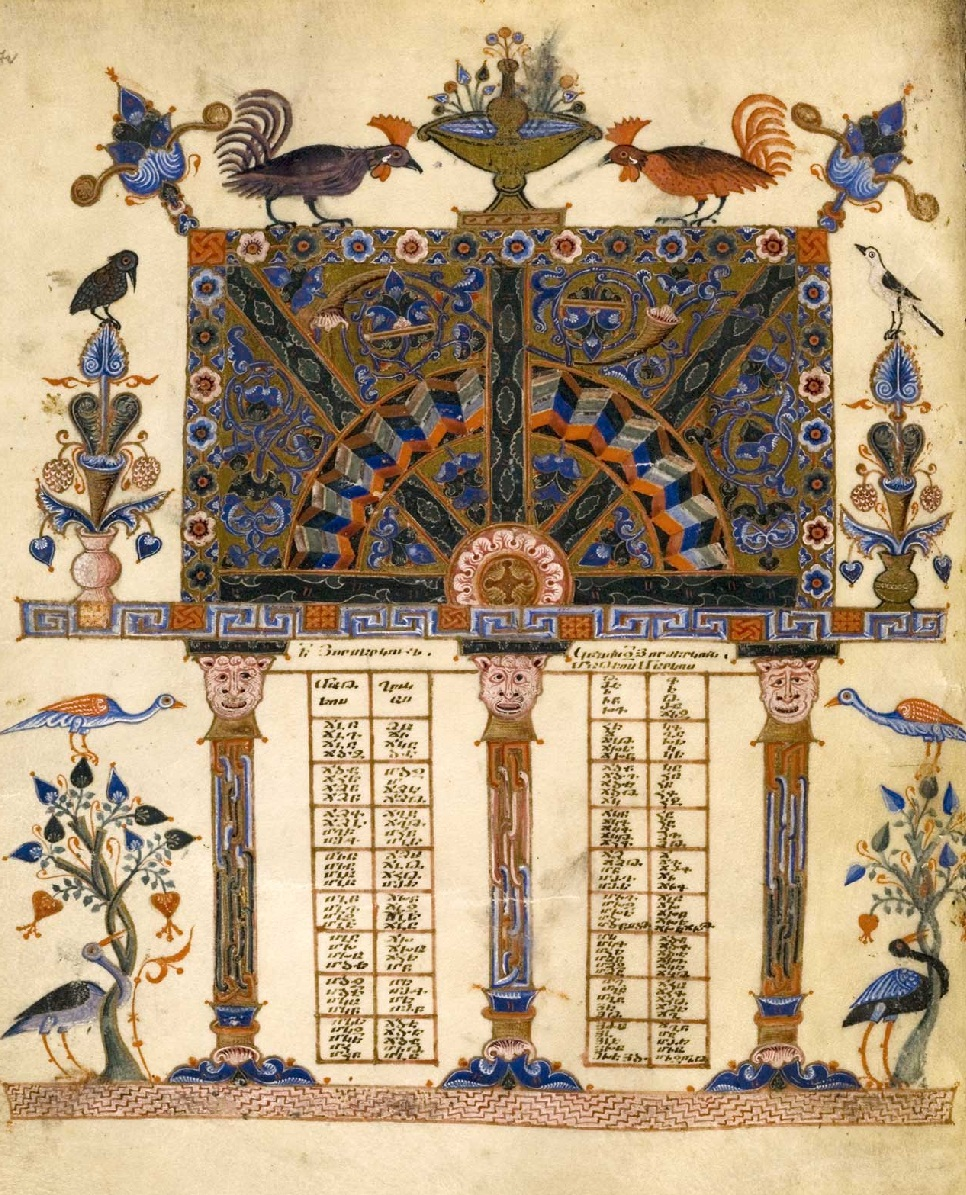
- Also known as: Lemberg Gospel
- Type: codex, evangeliary
- Date: late 12th century
- Language: Armenian
- Size: 28.9x21.5 cm, 426 lvs
- Accession: Rps 8101 III

Skevra Evangeliary is an illuminated Armenian evangeliary from the 12th century.

The evangeliary was produced in the year 647 of the Armenian Era, which corresponds to the years 1198/1199 of the Gregorian calendar. It was produced by Grigor Mlitchetsi who began it in the monastery of Mlidch and completed it in the monastery of Skevra. Owner's notes allow us to identify some stages in the history of the manuscript. One such note from 1422/1423 suggests that the Gospel book was already in what was then Poland at that time, possibly already in Lviv.

From 19th century to the Second World War it was kept in the Armenian Cathedral in Lviv. After the Second World War it was brought to the region of Kraków and deposited in the monastery of Tyniec, from where it was given to the archive of the Archdiocese of Gniezno in 1985. These movements after 1945 were unknown to science and the public until the manuscript was accidentally discovered and identified by German byzantinist Günter Prinzing in Gniezno in 1993. From 1996 to 1997, the book was in the Gutenberg Museum in Mainz for Conservation and restoration as well as for an interdisciplinary study that was published in 1997. Regarding the following months, it had been agreed that the manuscript would be taken to New York for a special exhibition. However, the responsible Polish authorities prohibited this transfer shortly before and demanded its immediate return to Poland. For the following years, the location and conservational condition of the evangeliary was again not known to the public whilst, as became public later, the Primate of Poland had taken it into custody. In 2006 the head of the Armenian Catholic Church in Poland, who is the Catholic Archbishop of Warsaw, placed the Evangeliary on deposit in the National Library of Poland. From May 2024, the manuscript is presented at a permanent exhibition in the Palace of the Commonwealth.

The manuscript contains 426 leaves, measuring 28.9 x 2.1 cm. The text comprises the four Gospels and artistically decorated canon tables. The miniatures in the manuscript are important examples of the illuminator's art from Lesser Armenia, or the Armenian Kingdom of Cilicia. Influences from Byzantine art are visible. The text is decorated with full-page miniatures depicting Evangelists and figurative, floral and zoomorphic initials. It is one of the world's most valuable Armenian manuscripts.

== Bibliography ==
- Hannick, Christian; Prinzing, Günter. "Kurzbeschreibung des Lemberger Evangeliars (auch „Evangeliar von Skevra" genannt)". Prinzing & Schmidt 1997. pp. 27–30.
- Makowski, Tomasz; Sapała, Patryk, eds. (2024). The Palace of the Commonwealth. Three times opened. Treasures from the National Library of Poland at the Palace of the Commonwealth. Warsaw: National Library of Poland. p. 75.
- Prinzing, Günter; Schmidt, Andrea, eds. (1997). Das Lemberger Evangeliar. Eine armenische Bilderhandschrift [The Lemberg Evangeliary. An Armenian illuminated manuscript]. Sprachen und Kulturen des Christlichen Ostens. Vol. 2. Wiesbaden: Reichert. ISBN 3-88226-903-0..
- Prinzing, Günter (2005). "Zur Wiederentdeckung und historischen Bedeutung des Lemberger Evangeliars" [On the rediscovery and historical significance of the Lemberg Evangeliary]. In Drost-Abgarjan, Armenuhi; Goltz, Hermann (eds.). Armenologie in Deutschland: Beiträge zum Ersten Deutschen Armenologen-Tag. Studien zur orientalischen Kirchengeschichte. Vol. 35. Münster: Lit. pp. 127–134. ISBN 3-8258-8610-7.
