= Khosrov of Andzev =

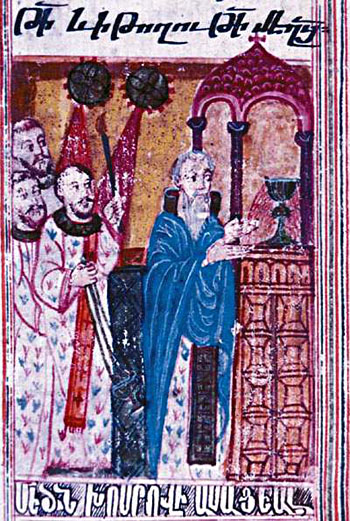

Khosrov of Andzev (died 964) was the father of Gregory of Narek, a tenth century poet. His two sons, Grigor and Hovhannes, studied at Narek monastery under abbot Anania Narekasti. He mainly wrote on topics such as the Armenian Apostolic Church and its ceremonies.
