= Narek, Ararat =

Village in Ararat, Armenia

Narek Նարեկ
- Location within Armenia Location within Ararat
- Coordinates: 40°01′N 44°37′E
- Country: Armenia
- Province: Ararat
- Municipality: Artashat

Population (2011)
  - Total: 1,001
- Time zone: UTC+4
  - Summer (DST): UTC+5

Narek (Armenian: Նարեկ) is a village in the Artashat Municipality of the Ararat Province of Armenia. In 1984, the town was named after Grigor Narekatsi. Narek was also a village in Western Armenia (Eastern Anatolia).
