= Helen C. Evans =

American art historian

Helen C. Evans is an American art historian and curator specializing in Byzantine art.

Evans has worked for the Metropolitan Museum of Art since 1991 and was co-curator along with William D. Wixom of its 1997 exhibition, The Glory of Byzantium: Art and Culture of the Middle Byzantine Era. She became a scholar devoted to the documentation of Byzantine art because according to her, "Byzantine art is underrepresented because Byzantine history slowly disappeared from the way we look at the world. The empire ended at roughly the same moment that Columbus found the New World. When we do an exhibition like Interwoven Globe at the Met, it starts at 1500 and we don't look at the fact that Byzantium was on one of the great trade routes of the previous millennium and a half—or several millennia in fact. Until Columbus, you did not reach the spices of the orient; you did not reach the silks of China, without crossing the Eastern Mediterranean. ...When most academic scholarship really begins, Byzantium has been subsumed in the Ottoman Empire."

In 2018, she curated the exhibition "Armenia!". In 2019 Helen C. Evans was awarded by Friendship Order by the president of Armenia for representing the Armenian Culture to the World in a distinguished way, as well as for the significant contribution to the strengthening and development of the Armenian-American friendly relations.

== Publications ==
- The Glory of Byzantium: Art and Culture of the Middle Byzantine Era, A.D. 843-1261, editor and contributor with William D. Wixom, New York, 1997
- Trésors du monastère de Sainte-Catherine mont Sinaï, Egypte: [Rédigé à l'occasion de l'exposition présentée à la] Fondation Pierre Gianadda, Martigny, Suisse, 5 octobre au 12 décembre 2004, editor, Martigny 2004
- Saint Catherine's Monastery, Sinai, Egypt: A Photographic Essay, editor and contributor, New York, 2004
- Byzantium: Faith and Power (1261-1557), editor and contributor, New York, 2004
- Byzantium and Islam: Age of Transition, 7th-9th Century, editor and contributor with Brandie Ratliff, New York, 2012
