= Yervand Lalayan =

Armenian ethnographer and archaeologist

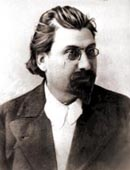
- Born: 25 March [O.S. 13 March] 1864; Alexandropol
- Died: 24 February 1931 (aged 66); Yerevan

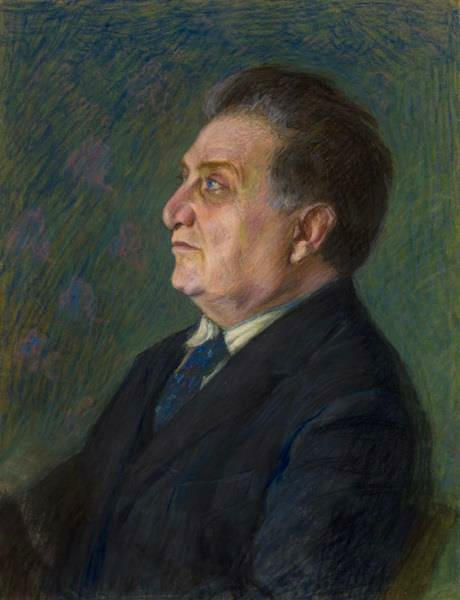
Portrait of Lalayan by Panos Terlemezian (c.1930)

Yervand Lalayan (Armenian: Երվանդ Լալայան, 25 March [O.S. 13 March] 1864 – 24 February 1931) was an Armenian ethnographer, archaeologist, and folklorist. He was also the founder and the first director of the History Museum of Armenia from 1919 to 1927.

== Biography ==
In 1885 he left Tiflis's Nersisian School and worked in Akhaltsikhe, Akhalkalaki, and Alexandropol as a teacher. In 1894 ending the faculty of social sciences in the University of Geneva. Receiving the level of Candidate of sociological sciences, he worked for the Mkhitarians of Venice.

Returning to Armenia, in 1895-1897 he worked in the diocesan school of Shushi. When here, and consulting with the notable scholars (Manuk Abeghian, T. Toramian, Hrachia Acharian, Leo, Melikset bek, S. Lisitsyan, Kh. Samuelyan, S. Zelinski, etc., he founded the periodical Azgagrakan Handes (Armenian: Ազգագագրական Հանդես, "Ethnographic Magazine") in 1896.

On November 21, 1900, he founded the Armenian Ethnographic publishing house in Tiflis. And in 1906 the Armenian Ethnographic Society. The museum of the society was transferred from Tiflis to Yerevan in 1921.

== Works ==
Lalayan's works were regularly published in "Azgagrakan Handes" in 1897–1916. They included:

- "Javakhk",
- "Varanda",
- "The Province of Zanguezur",
- "The Province of Gandzak",
- "The Province of Borchalu",
- "Vayots Dzor",
- "Nakhijevan or Nakhchavan Prefecture",
- "The Province of Nor Bayazet or Gegharkunik",
- "Ritual Rites among the Armenians",
- "The Excavations of Burial Mounds in Soviet Armenia" (Yerevan, 1931)

comprise only a part of his rich scientific heritage.
