= Ara Baliozian =

Armenian author, translator, and critic (1936–2019)

Ara Baliozian (Armenian: Արա Պալիոզեան; 10 December 1936 – 7 December 2019) was an Armenian author, translator, and critic who is published in both Armenian and English.

Born in Athens, Greece, Baliozian received his education at the Mekhitarist College of Moorat-Raphael in Venice, Italy, where he also studied economics and political science at the Ca' Foscari University of Venice. He lived in Ontario, Canada, where he devoted his time to writing. He was also the winner of many prizes and government grants for his literary work, which included fiction, drama, literary criticism, and translations from Armenian, French, and Italian. In his later years, he posted his works on different Armenian internet discussion boards. Baliozian died in Ontario on 7 December 2019.

== Memoirs and fiction ==
- The Horrible Silence: An Autobiographical Novella (Maral Press, 1982)
- In the New World (Voskedar, 1982)
- The Call of the Crane/The Ambitions of a Pig (Voskedar, 1983)
- The Greek Poetess and Other Writings (Impressions Publishers, 1988)

== Historiographical works ==
- The Armenians: Their History and Culture (AGBU Ararat Press, 1980)
- The Armenian Genocide & The West (Impressions Publishers, 1984)
- Armenia Observed: An Anthology

== Critical works ==
- Portrait of a Genius and Other Essays (A/G Press, 1980)
- Views/Reviews/Interviews: Critical Articles, Conversations (A/G Press, 1982)
- Voices of Fear (Impressions Publishers, 1989)
- Perseverance: Ara Baliozian and the Armenian Cause (Impressions Publishers, 1990)
- That Promising Reality: New Visions & Values, The Armenian Revival (Impressions Publishers, 1992)
- Definitions: A Critical Companion to Armenian History and Culture (Impressions Publishers, 1998)
- Unpopular Opinions (Impressions Publishers, 1998)
- Fragmented Dreams: Armenians in Diaspora
- Intimate Talk
- Undiplomatic Observations
- Pages from my Diary: 1986–1995
- Conversations with Nazali Bagdasarian

== Translations ==
- Puzant Granian, My Land, My People
- Puzant Granian, Selected Poems / 1936–1982
- Zabel Yessayan, The Gardens of Silihdar & Other Writings (Ashod Press, 1982)
- Gostan Zarian, The Traveller & His Road (Ashod Press, 1981)
- Gostan Zarian, Bancoop & the Bones of the Mammoth (Ashod Press, 1982)
- Gostan Zarian, The Island & A Man (Kar Publishing House, 1983)
- Krikor Zohrab, Zohrab: An Introduction (Kar Publishing House, 1985)

== Compilations ==
- From Plato to Sartre: Wisdom for Armenians (ISBN 0-931539-12-9)
- Armenian wisdom : A Treasury of Quotations & Proverbs (2nd ed ISBN 0-931539-08-0)
- Dictionary of Armenian Quotations (Impressions Publishers, 1998)
