= Movses Khorenatsi =

Armenian historian

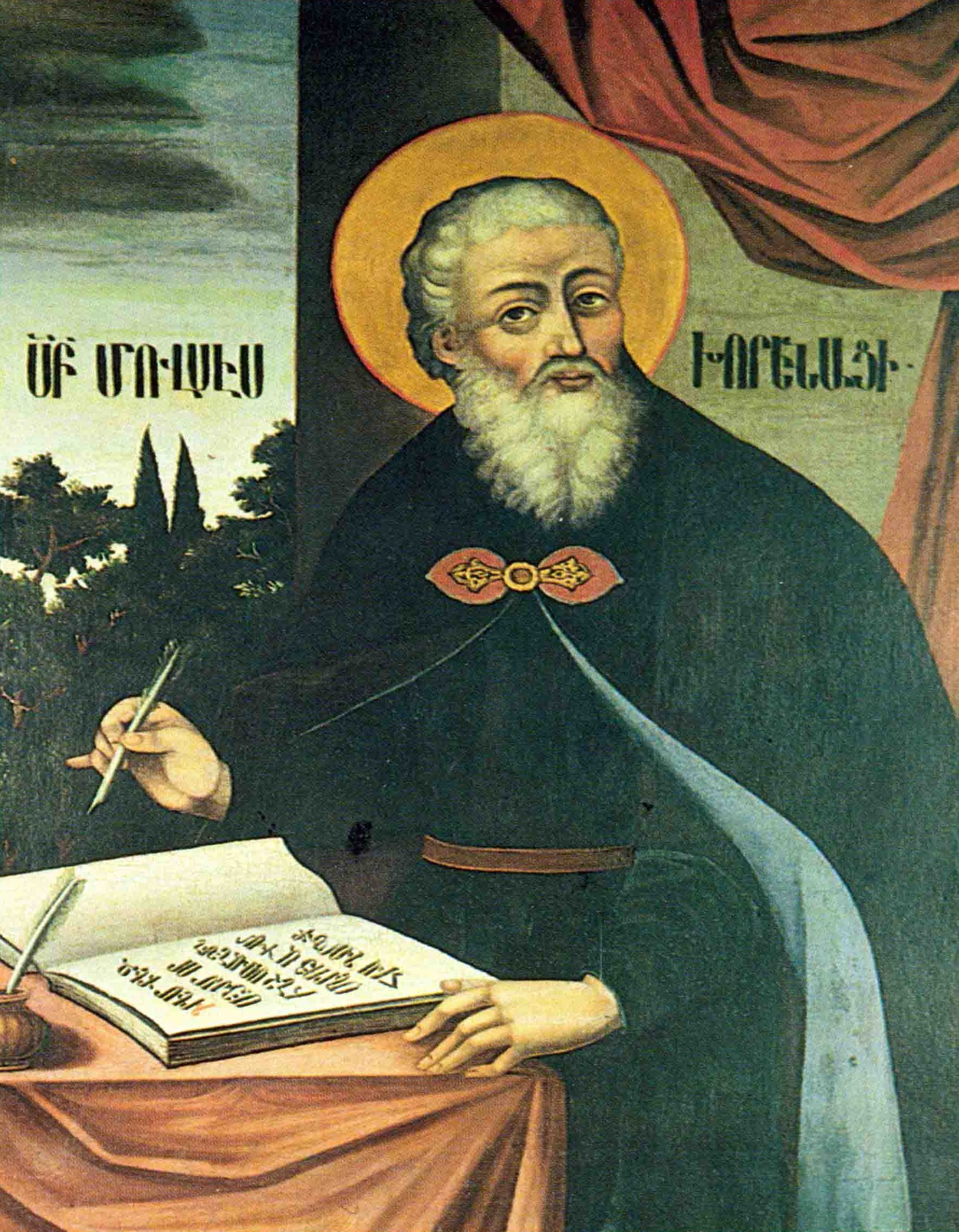
- A painting of Movses Khorenatsi by Hovnatan Hovnatanian (1730–1801)
- Born: c. 410; Kingdom of Armenia
- Died: c. 490s Sasanian Armenia
- Venerated in: Armenian Apostolic Church
- Feast: Feast of the Holy Translators in October
- Patronage: Armenia

Movses Khorenatsi (c. 410–490s AD; Armenian: Մովսէս Խորենացի, pronounced [mɔvˈsɛs χɔɾɛnɑˈtsʰi]) (Note: Also written as Movses Xorenac'i and Moses of Khoren, Moses of Chorene, and Moses Chorenensis in Latin sources.) was a prominent Armenian historian from late antiquity and the author of the History of the Armenians.

Movses's History of the Armenians was the first attempt at a universal history of Armenia and remains the only known general account of early Armenian history. It traces Armenian history from its origins to the fifth century, during which Movses claimed to have lived. His history had an enormous impact on Armenian historiography and was used and quoted extensively by later medieval Armenian authors. He is called the "father of Armenian history" (patmahayr) in Armenian, and is sometimes referred to as the "Armenian Herodotus". Movses's history is also valued for its unique material on the old oral traditions in Armenia before its conversion to Christianity. Approximately twenty manuscripts of Movses's history have reached us, the majority of which date from the thirteenth and fourteenth centuries.

Movses identified himself as a young disciple of Mesrop Mashtots, inventor of the Armenian alphabet. Moreover, he claimed to have written his history at the behest of Prince Sahak of the Bagratuni dynasty. He is recognized by the Armenian Apostolic Church as one of the Holy Translators. The exact time period during which Movses lived and wrote has been the subject of much debate among scholars since the nineteenth century, with some scholars dating him to the seventh to ninth centuries rather than the fifth.

== Biography ==
=== Early life and education ===
Movses gives autobiographical details about himself in his History of the Armenians. Later Armenian authors provide additional details about Khorenatsi's life, although according to scholar Stepan Malkhasyants, these are not reliable. Movses's epithet, Khorenatsi, suggests that he was born in a place called Khoren or Khorean. According to one older view, Movses was born in the village of Khorni (also called Khoron or Khoronk) in the Armenian province of Taron or Turuberan. Some sources call Movses Taronatsi ('of Taron'). However, Malkhasyants contends that if Movses had been born in Khorni, he would have been known as Movses Khornetsi or Khoronatsi. Malkhasyants instead proposed as Khorenatsi's birthplace the village of Khoreay (Խորեայ) in the Haband district of the province of Syunik, which is mentioned by the thirteenth-century historian Stepanos Orbelian. (Note: Malkhasyants notes a number of other facts that support Syunik as the birthplace of Khorenatsi: the author's familiarity with Syunik, the Arax River and the villages on its banks; his praise of the legendary patriarch of Syunik Sisak; and his dislike of the House of Mamikonian, who were enemies of the lords of Syunik in the second half of the 5th century.) According to this view, the name Khoreay developed from the earlier unattested form Khorean.

Accepting Khorenatsi's claimed fifth-century dating, Malkhasyants proposes 410 as the approximate year of his birth, arguing that he probably would have been a young man of about 22 or 23 upon journeying to Alexandria, where Movses writes that he was sent after the Council of Ephesus of 431. Malkhasyants postulates that Khorenatsi received his initial education at the school in Syunik founded by Mesrop Mashtots, the creator of the Armenian alphabet, before being sent to Vagharshapat to study directly under Mashtots and Catholicos Sahak Partev. After the Council of Ephesus, when Mashtots and Sahak were correcting the Classical Armenian translation of the Christian Bible according to the Koine Greek original, or translating it into Armenian a second time, they decided to send Movses and several of their other students to Alexandria, Egypt—one of the great centers of learning in the world at the time—to master Hellenic learning and the literary arts.

=== Journey and return to Armenia ===
The students left Armenia sometime between 432 and 435. First they went to Edessa where they studied at the local libraries. Then they moved towards Jerusalem and Alexandria. After studying in Alexandria for seven years, Movses and his classmates returned to Armenia, only to find that Mesrop and Sahak had died. Movses expressed his grief in a lament at the end of History of the Armenians:

While they [Mesrop and Sahak] awaited our return to celebrate their student's accomplishments [i.e., Movses'], we hastened from Byzantium, expecting that we would be dancing and singing at a wedding ... and instead, I found myself grieving at the foot of our teachers' graves ... I did not even arrive in time to see their eyes close nor hear them speak their final words.

To further complicate their problems, the atmosphere in Armenia that Movses and the other students had returned to was one that was extremely hostile and they were viewed with contempt by the native population. While later Armenian historians blamed this on an ignorant populace, Sassanid Persian policy and ideology were also at fault, since its rulers "could not tolerate highly educated young scholars fresh from Greek centers of learning". Given this atmosphere and persecution by the Persians, Movses went into hiding in a village near Vagharshapat and lived in relative seclusion for several decades.

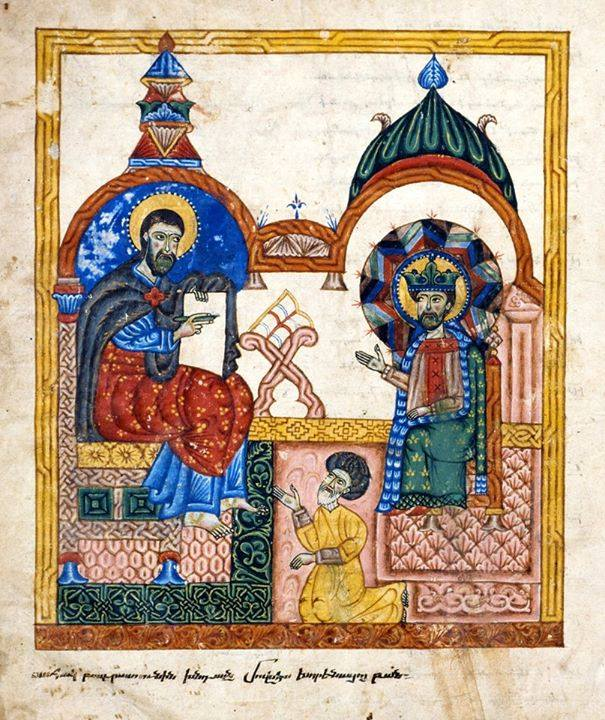
Movses depicted in a fourteenth-century Armenian manuscript

Gyut, Catholicos of All Armenians (461–471), one day met Movses while traveling through the area and, unaware of his true identity, invited him to supper with several of his students. Movses was initially silent, but after Gyut's students encouraged him to speak, Movses made a marvelous speech at the dinner table. One of the Catholicos' students was able to identify Movses as a person Gyut had been searching for; it was soon understood that Gyut was one of Movses' former classmates and friends. Gyut embraced Movses brought his friend back from seclusion and appointed him to be a bishop in Bagrevand.

=== History of the Armenians ===
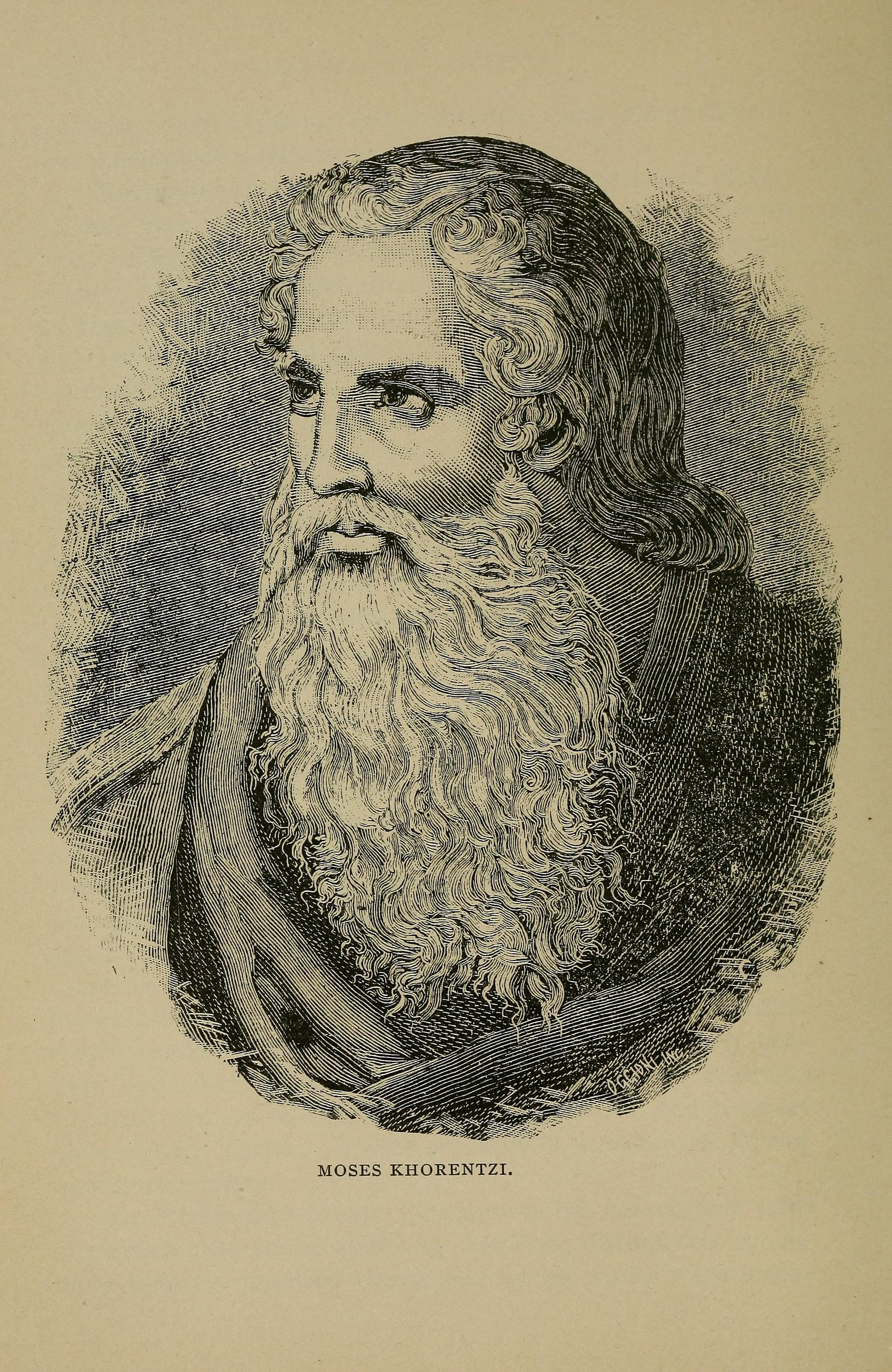
Movses Khorenatsi painting in book Illustrated Armenia and the Armenians (1908)

Serving as a bishop, Movses was approached by Prince Sahak Bagratuni (died in 482 during the battle of Charmana against the Persian army), who, having heard of his reputation, asked him to write a history of Armenia, especially the biographies of Armenian kings and the origins of the Armenian nakharar families. Armenian historian Artashes Matevosyan placed Movses' completion of History to the year 474 CE based on his research on the Chronicle by the sixth-century Armenian historian Atanas Taronatsi.

One of his primary reasons for taking up Sahak Bagratuni's request is given in the first part of Patmutyun Hayots, or History of the Armenians: "For even though we are small and very limited in numbers and have been conquered many times by foreign kingdoms, yet too, many acts of bravery have been performed in our land, worthy of being written and remembered, but of which no one has bothered to write down." His work is a first historical record that covered the whole history of Armenia from a very ancient period until the death of the historian. His History served as a textbook to study the history of Armenia until the eighteenth century. Movses's history also gives a rich description of the oral traditions that were popular among the Armenians of the time, such as the romance story of Artashes and Satenik and the birth of the god Vahagn. Movses lived for several more years, and he died sometime in the late 490s CE.

== Historiography ==
=== Classical authors ===
Three possible early references to Movses in other sources are usually identified. The first one is in Ghazar Parpetsi's History of the Armenians (about 495 or 500 A.D.), where the author details the persecution of several notable Armenian individuals, including the "blessed Movses the philosopher", identified by some scholars as Movses Khorenatsi. The second one is the Book of Letters (sixth century), which contains a short theological treatise by "Movses Khorenatsi". The third possible early reference is in a tenth-to-eleventh-century manuscript containing a list of dates attributed to Athanasius (Atanas) of Taron (sixth century): under the year 474, the list has "Movses Khorenatsi, philosopher and writer".

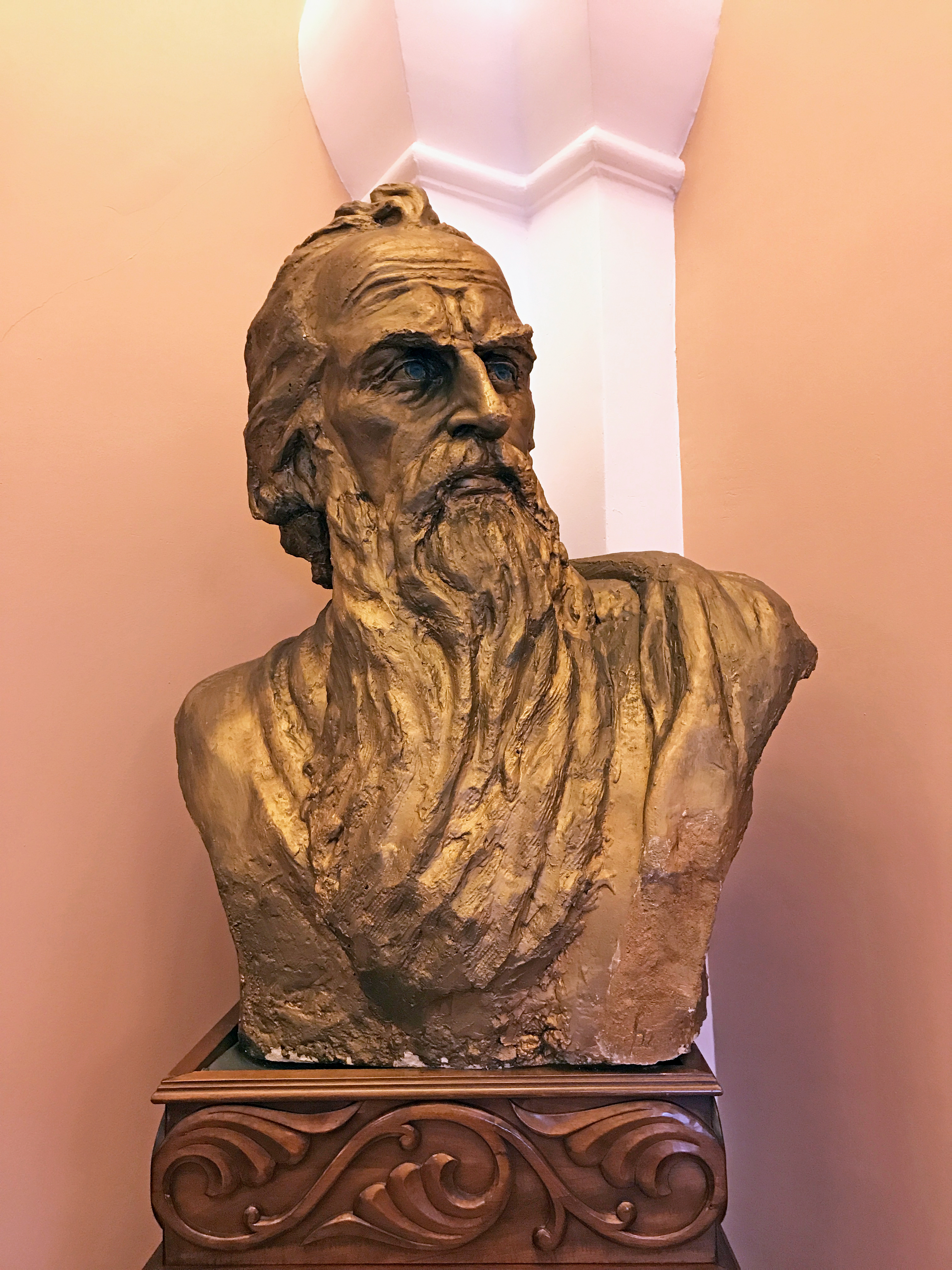
A bust of Khorenatsi at the Matenadaran

=== Early scholarship ===
Beginning in the nineteenth century, as a part of a general trend in those years to reexamine critically classical sources, Khorenatsi's History was cast into doubt. The conclusions reached by Alfred von Gutschmid ushered in the "hypercritical phase" of the study of Khorenatsi's work. Many European and Armenian scholars writing at the turn of the twentieth century downplayed its importance as a historical source and dated the History to sometime in the seventh to ninth centuries. Stepan Malkhasyants, an Armenian philologist and expert of Classical Armenian literature, likened this early critical period from the late nineteenth to early twentieth centuries to a "competition", whereby one scholar attempted to outperform the other in their criticism of Khorenatsi.

=== Modern studies ===
In the early decades of the twentieth century, scholars such as F. C. Conybeare, Manuk Abeghian, and Malkhasyants rejected the conclusions of the scholars of the hypercritical school and placed Khorenatsi back in the fifth century. Additionally, several of Khorenatsi's claims and references have been proven by contemporary ethnographic and archaeological research.

During the second half of the twentieth century, the arguments made by the hypercritical school were revived by a number of scholars in Western academia. Robert W. Thomson, the former holder of the chair in Armenian Studies at Harvard University and the translator of several classical Armenian works, became the most vocal critic of Khorenatsi with the 1978 publication of his English translation of History of the Armenians. Thomson labeled Khorenatsi an "audacious, and mendacious, faker" and "a mystifier of the first order". He wrote that Khorenatsi's account contained various anachronisms and inventions.

Thomson's arguments were criticized by a number of scholars both in and outside Armenia. Vrej Nersessian, the curator of the Christian Middle East Section at the British Library, took issue with many of Thomson's characterizations, including his later dating of the writing and his contention that Khorenatsi was merely an apologist work for the princely Bagratuni dynasty:

If so, how does one explain then Moses's complete preoccupation with the events preceding A.D. 440 and his silence regarding the events leading up the Arab incursions and occupation of Armenia between 640–642? Moreover, if the definite purpose of the History was for "boosting the reputation of the Bagratuni family" then these events should have been central theme of his history; the skilful handling of which brought the Bagratid pre-eminence. ... The ecclesiastical interests do not point to the eighth century. There is no echo of the Chalcedonian controversy which engaged the Armenians from 451 to 641 when the ecclesiastical unity formulated by the council of Theodosiopolis was renounced.

Gagik Sargsyan, an Armenian scholar of the Classics and a leading biographer of Khorenatsi, also criticized Thomson for his "anachronistic hypercriticism" and for stubbornly rehashing and "even exaggerating the statements once put forward" by the late nineteenth and early twentieth-century scholars, particularly Grigor Khalatiants (1858–1912). Sargsyan noted that Thomson, in condemning Khorenatsi's failure to mention his sources, ignored the fact that "an antique or medieval author may have had his own rules of mentioning the sources distinct from the rules of modern scientific ethics". Thomson's allegation of Khorenatsi's plagiarism and supposed distortion of sources was also countered by scholars who contended that Thomson was "treating a medieval author with the standards" of twentieth-century historiography and pointed out that numerous classical historians, Greek and Roman alike, engaged in the same practice. Aram Topchyan, then a research fellow at the Hebrew University of Jerusalem of Armenian Studies, agreed and noted that it was odd that Thomson would fault Khorenatsi for failing to mention his sources because this was an accepted practice among all classical historians.

In 2000, historian Nina Garsoïan wrote that the dispute over Khorenatsi's dating continued and that "no final agreement on this subject has yet been reached" at the time. In a study first published in 2003–2004, Garsoïan argued that the final version of the history should be dated to the half-century following 775, although she did not rule out the possibility that this final version was based on a history under the name of Movses Khorenatsi dating back to the fifth century. In 2021, historian Albert Stepanyan noted that "some skepticism remains regarding the person and work of Khorenatsi", but he affirms Khorenatsi's fifth-century dating and attributes the modern criticism of Khorenatsi to the misinterpretation of interpolations into the work from later times.

Today, Movses Khorenatsi's work is recognized as an important source for the research of Urartian and early Armenian history. It was Movses Khorenatsi's account of the ancient city of Van with its cuneiform inscriptions which lead the Société Asiatique of Paris to finance the expedition of Friedrich Eduard Schulz, who there discovered the previously unknown Urartian language.

== Manuscript history ==
Approximately twenty manuscripts of Khorenatsi's History of the Armenians have reached us. The majority of these date from the thirteenth and fourteenth centuries. The scribe of one manuscript mentions that his was copied from the manuscript of Nerses Lambronatsi. It is assumed that this copy is the oldest, as it dates from the twelfth century. Armenian historians date ten fragments earlier than the manuscripts with the full text but do not provide any of their readings. A fragment kept in Venice is dated to the ninth century or earlier; a fragment kept in Vienna is dated to the ninth-to-tenth centuries; fragments kept in the Matenadaran are dated to the tenth-to-eleventh centuries; and one fragment on paper is dated to the fourteenth century.

== Works ==
The following works are also attributed to Movses:

- Letter on the Assumption of the Blessed Virgin Mary
- Homily on Christ's Transfiguration
- History of Rhipsime and Her Companions
- Hymns used in Armenian Church Worship
- Commentaries on the Armenian Grammarians
- Explanations of Armenian Church Offices

=== Published editions ===
==== Armenian ====
- — (1843). Patmowt'iwn Hayoc' [History of Armenia]. Venice: St. Lazar.
- Abeghian, Manuk (1913). Movsisi Xorenac'woy Patmowt'iwn Hayoc' [History of Armenia]. Tiflis. (Critical edition).
- — (1984). Patmowt'yown Hayoc' [History of Armenia]. Erevan. (A facsimile reproduction in three volumes of the original title as published in Venice in 1784–1786).
- Sargsyan, A. B. (1991). Patmowt'yown Hayoc' [History of Armenia]. Erevan: Armenian Academy of Sciences.
- Malxasyanc', Step'an (1997). Movses Xorenac'i, Hayoc' Patmowt'yown (PDF). Erevan: "Hayastan" hratarakčowt'yown. (Translation into modern Armenian with introduction and notes).

==== English ====
- James Bryce, 1st Viscount Bryce. Armenian Legends and Poems Bryce has selections of Khorenatsi's History of Armenia
- Thomson, Robert W. (1978). Moses Khorenats'i: History of the Armenians. Cambridge, MA: Harvard University Press.
- Movses Khorenatsi. "History of Armenia" . In Roberts, Alexander; Donaldson, James; Coxe, Arthur Cleveland; Schaff, Philip (eds.). Memoirs of Edessa And Other Ancient Syriac Documents. Ante-Nicene Fathers. Vol. VIII. Translated by Pratten, Benjamin Plummer.. A portion of Book II of Khorenatsi's History of Armenia.

==== Latin ====
- Whiston, Gulielmus; Whiston, Georgius (1736), Mosis Chorenensis Historiae Armenicae libri III: accedit ejusdem scriptoris epitome Geographiae, London: ex officina Caroli Ackers typographi

==== French ====
- P. E. Le Vaillant, De Florival (1841), Moise de Khorene Auteur Du V. siecle. Histoire D'Armenie, vol. 1, Venice: Typogr. Armenienne De Saint-Lazare
- P. E. Le Vaillant, De Florival (1841), Moise de Khorene Auteur Du V. siecle. Histoire D'Armenie, vol. 2, Venice: Typogr. Armenienne De Saint-Lazare
- Mahé, Jean-Pierre (1993), Moïse de Khorène, Histoire de l'Arménie, Paris: Gallimard, ISBN 2070729044

==== Russian ====
- Ioannesov, Joseph (1809), Арменская история, сочиненная Моисеем Хоренским, Saint Petersburg: Typogr. Medit͡sinskai͡a
- Ėmin, Nikita O. (1858), История Армении Моисея Хоренского, Moscow: Typogr. Katkova
- Ėmin, Nikita O. (1893), История Армении Моисея Хоренского, Moscow
- Sargsyan, Gagik (1990), Мовсес Хоренаци. История Армении, Yerevan: Hayastan, ISBN 5540010841
