= Grigor Mlitchetsi =

Armenian miniaturist and penman

Grigor Mlichetsi
- Born: unknown
- Died: 1215/1216; Skevra, Armenian Kingdom of Cilicia
- Occupations: Miniaturist and scribe
- Notable work: The Book of Sadness, The Gospel of Skevra
- Style: Miniature and Calligraphy

Grigor Mlichetsi (Skevratsi) (d. 1215 or 1216, Skevra, Armenian Kingdom of Cilicia) was an Armenian miniaturist and penman of the 12th–13th centuries, representative of the Skevra pen house of the Cilician school of miniatures.

== Biography ==
Grigor Mlichetsi first worked in the library of the monastery of Mlichy and in 1197 moved to the nearby monastery of Skevra where he became head of the Scriptorium. He also worked in Rumkale. Kostandin and Vardan are known among his senior artist friends. The three of them illustrated the "Gospel of Tigranakert" in 1173 (the location of the manuscript is unknown). He illustrated five manuscripts in the years 1173–1215.

He died in old age, leaving the illustration of the last Gospel (1215, New Julfa, Amenprakich Monastery, hand: JSP 546) unfinished.

=== The Book of Lamentations ===
Grigor Mlichetsi earned acclaim as a distinguished and lauded artist during his era. The historical and artistic significance of his work is notably exemplified in the meticulous craftsmanship evident in the altar ornaments, capital letters, textured border embellishments, and the four portraits of Narekatsi within Grigor Narekatsi's parchment manuscript titled "The Tragedy of Matean" (Matenadaran, manuscript No. 1568). This particular masterpiece, commissioned by Nerses of Lambrona in 1173, stands as a testament to Mlichetsi's skill, capturing the essence of the artistic and cultural milieu of its time. In this parchment book, the altar decorations, nominal half altars and headdresses are made with great elegance and taste. The capital letters, fashioned as ornamental motifs reminiscent of cross stones, stand out for their noteworthy craftsmanship. The celebrated border decorations, displaying mastery in execution, further enhance the manuscript's artistic appeal. The manuscript is particularly valuable among Grigor Narekatsi's applicants. The artist wanted to create several aspects of Narekatsi with four images: a philosopher, a guard (prayer), a hermit, emphasizing his poetic image.

=== The Skevra Evangeliary ===
The Skevra Evangeliary ("Gospel of Lviv", from 1830 or earlier until 1945 in Lviv) was written and illustrated by Grigor Mlichetsi and finished in 1198/1199. German Byzantine scholar Günter Prinzing discovered it in 1993 in the archbishopric archive of the Polish city of Gniezno. A color copy is in the National Library of Armenia.

The art of Grigor Mlichetsi became the XIII century. From the foundations of the development of Cilician miniature.

== Sources ==
- Azaryan L., Cilician Miniatures of the XII–XIII centuries, E., 1964. A.
- Schmidt, Andrea (1997). "Kloster Skevra (12.–14. Jahrhundert) im Schnittpunkt kirchlichen und kulturellen Wandels in Kilikien" [Skevra Monastery (12th–14th centuries) at the crossroads of ecclesiastical and cultural change in Cilicia]. In Prinzing, Günter; Schmidt, Andrea (eds.). Das Lemberger Evangeliar. Eine armenische Bilderhandschrift [The Lemberg Evangeliary. An Armenian illuminated manuscript]. Wiesbaden: Reichert. pp. 121–142. ISBN 3-88226-903-0.
