= Elishe =

Armenian historian (410–475)

Saint Elishe
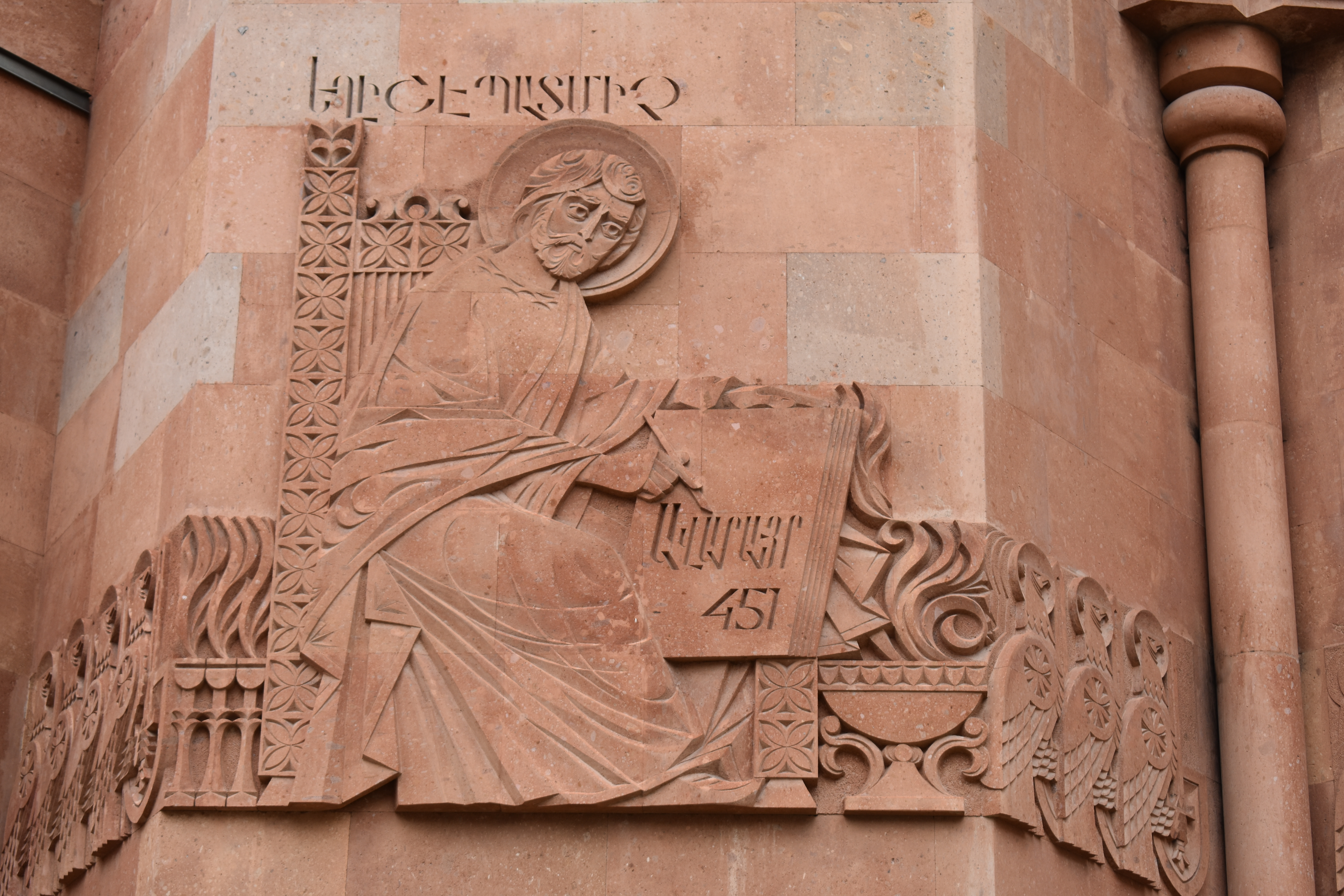
- A relief of Yeghishe at the Armenian Cathedral of Moscow.

Vardapet (Doctor of the Church)
- Born: 410
- Died: 475
- Venerated in: Armenian Apostolic Church; Armenian Catholic Church

Elishe
- Occupation: Historian
- Known for: History of Vardan and the Armenian War
- Title: Doctor of the Church

Elishe (Old Armenian: Եղիշէ, romanized: Ełišē, Modern Armenian pronunciation [jɛʁiˈʃɛ], 410 – 475) was an Armenian historian from the time of late antiquity, best known as the author of History of Vardan and the Armenian War, a history of the fifth-century Armenian revolt led by Vardan Mamikonian against the suppression of Christianity under Sassanid Iranian rule.

== Life ==
According to ancient and medieval sources that have trickled down to historians, Elishe was one of the younger pupils of Sahak Partev and Mesrop Mashtots, the inventor of the Armenian alphabet. In 434, he, along with several other students, were sent to Alexandria to study Greek, Syriac and the liberal arts. He returned to Armenia in 441 and entered into military service, serving as a soldier or secretary to Sparapet Vardan Mamikonian. (Note: Some have also identified him with Elishe, Bishop of Amatuni, who took part in the 449 Synod of Artashat.) He took part in the war of religious independence (449–451) against the Persian king Yazdegerd II.

Following their defeat at the battle of Avarayr, he renounced military life, became a hermit and retired to the mountains south of Lake Van (in the province of Rshtunik). In 464–465, he was asked to write the history of the events leading up to and after the battle of Avarayr by a priest named David Mamikonian. Following his death, his remains were removed and taken to the Surb Astvatsatsin Monastery, located along Lake Van's shoreline. All ancient authorities speak of Elishe as a vardapet (church doctor).

Beginning with Babgen Guleserian in 1909 and Father Nerses Akinian, a member of the Mkhitarian Congregation, in the 1930s, the dating of Elishe's work was cast into doubt and moved a century or two forward. One point from their argument was predicated on the assumption that the Armenian translation of Philo's works, which Elishe uses, was not made until around 600 AD. However, the translation of Philo's works had taken place during the early "Hellenizing" period of the Golden Age of Armenian literature (the fifth century AD). Scholars argue that neither the dating of the Hellenizing phase nor the presence of Hellenizing vocabulary are necessarily dependent on Elishe’s dating. Furthermore, there are no verbal literal parallels between the two authors, since Elishe directly translated Philo's work from its original Greek into Armenian.

Another argument that was made to support the later dating was the assertion that, given the parallels, Elishe's History of Vardan is simply an adaptation of the late fifth-century Armenian historian Ghazar Parpetsi's History of Armenia. Ghazar, however, recounts the history of Armenia from the late fourth century to his own times, the battle of Avarayr merely figuring as one episode among many in his work. Elishe's goal, on the other hand, was to immortalize the "heavenly valor" of the Armenians and "provide comfort to friends, hope to the hopeful, and encouragement to the brave." As opposed to Ghazar, Elishe is able to give the individual names of fortresses and demonstrates an expert knowledge in the military tactics used by the Armenians and the Persians during the battle, indicating that he was "standing closer to the events." His understanding of the customs of Zoroastrianism and the Zurvanite doctrine is also far more detailed and superior than Ghazar's. Elishe's complete failure to mention the Council of Chalcedon, (Note: The Council of Chalcedon was held several months after the battle of Avarayr, without any representative of the Armenian Church.) the theological conclusions of which led to the complete breakdown of relations between the Greek Orthodox and Armenian Apostolic Churches following the 506 Council of Dvin, has also led scholars to reject the later dating.

== Works ==
Armenian

Մահ ոչ իմացեալ՝ մահ է, մահ իմացեալ՝ անմահութիւն է։

Transliteration

Mah oč῾ imac῾eal mah ē, mah imac῾eal anmahut῾iwn ē։

English translation by Robert W. Thomson

Death not understood is death, death understood is immortality.

—Elishe, History of Vardan and the Armenian War.

Elishe’s most famous work is the History of Vardan and the Armenian War [written] at the request of David Mamikonian, which he calls a Hishatakaran ('Memorial' or 'Recollection', rather than a standard history). In this he recounts the struggle of the Armenians, in union with the Iberians and the Caucasian Albanians, for their common faith, against the Persians (449-451). Both sides saw religion as a badge of national identity; the Armenians were determined to retain Christianity, while the Persians attempted to force a reintroduction of Zoroastrianism. In his own words, Elishe wrote the work "in order to reprove his sins, so that everyone hears and knows they may cast curses on him and not lust after his deeds." The work is considered one of the masterpieces of classical Armenian literature and is almost entirely free from Greek words and expressions.

A number of other works also exist by Elishe. There is an Exhortation to the monks; On the transfiguration, a Homily on the Passion of the Lord. The "Questions and Answers on Genesis" is probably not genuine.

== Editions ==
The original text of Elishe's work, like all others written during this period, does not exist (all currently extant Armenian manuscripts date to the tenth century or later). The oldest surviving manuscripts of his History of Vardan date to 1174 and 1172 (Matenadaran № 1890).

An edition of it was published at Venice in 1826 by the Mechitarists of San Lazzaro. One of the manuscripts on which it is based purports to be a faithful copy of another manuscript dated to 616. The text of that edition was further improved in subsequent editions at the same place (1828, 1838, 1859, and 1864). Among other editions of value are those of Theodosia in Crimea (Ukraine), 1861, and of Jerusalem, 1865. Elishe is also the author of a commentary on Joshua and Judges, an explanation of the Lord's Prayer, a letter to the Armenian monks, etc., all found in the Venice editions of the History of Vartan. A landmark study and critical edition of the text was prepared by philologist Yervand Ter-Minassian in 1957.

== Translations ==
In addition to the seven chapters mentioned by Elishe himself in his introductory remarks, the following editions contain an eighth chapter referring to the so-called Leontine martyrs and others. The authenticity of that chapter has been called into question. It has been also remarked that in all the manuscripts the fifth chapter is missing, while in the editions the original sixth chapter is cut in two so as to make up for the missing chapter.

There is a French translation by Langlois (1869) and Italian translation by G. Cappelletti (Venice, 1840).

There is an abridged English translation by C. F. Neumann (1830) and unabridged editions by Dickran H. Boyadjian (1952) and Robert W. Thomson (1982).

== Bibliography ==
- Pane, Riccardo (2005). Storia di Vardan e dei martiri armeni (in Italian). Rome: Città Nuova. ISBN 9788831131827.
- Thomson, Robert W. (1998). "Ełišē". In Yarshater, Ehsan (ed.). Encyclopædia Iranica (Online ed.). Encyclopædia Iranica Foundation. (Print version: Encyclopædia Iranica, Vol. VIII, Fasc. 4, pp. 365–366.)
