= James R. Russell =

American historian (born 1953)

- Born: October 27, 1953 (age 72); New York City, US
- Education: Columbia University (B.A., 1974); University of Oxford (M.A., 1977); University of London, School of Oriental and African Studies (Ph.D., 1982)
- Occupations: Professor at Harvard University, author, scholar
- Known for: Armenian and Ancient Near Eastern scholar
- Partner: D.E. Cordell

James Robert Russell (born October 27, 1953) is a scholar and professor in Ancient Near Eastern, Iranian and Armenian Studies. He has published extensively in journals, and has written several books.

Russell served as Mashtots Professor of Armenian Studies at Department of Near Eastern Languages and Civilizations at Harvard University, and sat on the executive committee of Davis Center for Russian and Eurasian Studies.

In July 2016, Russell became semi-retired and moved his residence to Fresno, California.

As of 2023, Russell is Emeritus Mashtots Professor of Armenian Studies at Harvard University, Distinguished Visiting Professor of the Hebrew University of Jerusalem, and a part-time Lecturer in Jewish Studies and Biblical Hebrew at California State University, Fresno. In late March 2025 J.R. Russell returned to live in his native New York City neighborhood, Washington Heights in upper Manhattan.

== Early life and education ==
Russell was born in New York City and grew up in the Washington Heights Upper Manhattan neighborhood of New York City. His parents are Jewish: his mother's ancestry was Sephardic and his father's ancestry was Ashkenazic. He was educated at The Bronx High School of Science and Columbia College, Columbia University where he earned his BA summa cum laude in 1974. He then was awarded a Kellett Fellowship which he used to study at the University of Oxford, earning a B.Litt. in 1977, under the Armenologists Nina Garsoïan and Charles Dowsett.

He earned his PhD in 1982 at the University of London, School of Oriental and African Studies (SOAS), under the direction of Mary Boyce, with a dissertation entitled "Zoroastrianism in Armenia". It was later published by Harvard University Press.

== Academic career ==
Soon after finishing his PhD he returned to New York City and taught at Columbia University in the Department of Middle Eastern Languages and Cultures (MELAC). He subsequently moved to Israel to become a Lady Davis Professor at the Hebrew University of Jerusalem at the recommendation and invitation of the scholar Michael E. Stone. Russell has taught and lectured in Armenia, India, and Iran and at the Oriental Institute of the Russian Academy of Sciences and Saint Petersburg State University. He was Government Fellowship Lecturer at the Cama Institute in Bombay, India.

He has been interviewed as an expert and scholar on The History Channel's documentary programs including Angels: Good or Evil.

He lectured on Soteriology on the Silk Road for the Buddhist Lecture Series of the University of Toronto in October 2005, and organized and chaired an international symposium in the same month to commemorate the 1600th anniversary of Saint Mesrop Mashtots, inventor of the Armenian alphabet.

He has written on, translated, and analyzed the esoteric, mystical, and spiritual aspects of the writings of Gregory of Narek, and has written numerous articles for the Encyclopædia Iranica. He contributed to the New Leader magazine.

Ninety one of his selected published scholarly journal articles are gathered in his book, Armenian and Iranian Studies.

=== Harvard ===
In 1993, Russell was appointed to the Mashtots Chair in Armenian Studies in the Near Eastern Languages and Civilizations Department at Harvard University, a post which he occupied until his retirement in 2016. He succeeded Robert W. Thomson in the post, who had returned to the University of Oxford. Upon being appointed to the chair, he was awarded a Master of Arts ad eundem gradum, in that, according to Russell you "can’t be a full professor there unless you hold a Harvard degree, so when you’re appointed, they give you one."

At Harvard, Russell taught a wide range of subjects, including freshman seminars on literature and comparative religions, literature and cultures. Russell has been one of the three faculty advisers for the conservative fortnightly student newspaper The Harvard Salient.

== Critics ==
Russell has been called "A complex figure... (who) resists easy classification and is no stranger to controversy: reviled by Turks and Armenians alike."

Russell's writings were criticized by Armenian historians Armen Ayvazyan and Armen Petrosyan, who conclude that Russell made gross factual mistakes together with unsubstantiated and tendentious claims concerning Armenian history and culture. Ayvazyan considers Russell, along with a number of other leading American Armenologists, to be one of the representatives of the "false Western school of Armenian studies". Bert Vaux, an Associate Professor of Linguistics in the Department of Linguistics at Harvard University, said that Russell's "chair [of Armenian Studies] is actually hurting the [Armenian] community at this point. When you call the Armenians neo-Nazis, that isn't helping the community and it's not leaving it alone - it's hurting it. You are providing fodder for people that want to attack the Armenians." Vaux also said that Russell's "training is actually in Iranian Studies," although Russell (who taught modern and ancient Armenian as well as Armenian history at Columbia before arriving at Harvard, and most of whose scholarly work has been on Armenian language, culture, and history) does have both an undergraduate degree in Armenian studies and a Ph.D. on the subject of Zoroastrianism in Armenia.

In his speech at the conference "Rethinking Armenian Studies: Past, Present, and Future" on October 4, 2002, at Harvard University in Cambridge, MA, Russell cautioned the audience against the "conspiracy theories, xenophobia, and ultra-nationalist pseudo-science [which] have come increasingly into the mainstream of Armenology in the Armenian Republic" and which have found sympathetic outlets in some of the diasporic press, where paranoia and anti-Semitism have been notably present. "It is a task of the community to set its house in order because these trends are in the end suicidal," he said. Although Russell declines to debate such issues, he stated that "I will help with my pen what I still believe to be the great majority of Armenians to expose and destroy the sort of people who are not only dragging our field, but possibly the community itself into dangerous territory".

== Personal life ==
Russell is the son of Dr. Charlotte Sananes Russell, a Professor Emeritus of Chemistry and Biochemistry at the City College of New York, and Joseph Brooke Russell, an attorney and arbitrator in New York.

Upon retiring from active teaching at Harvard, James Russell has lived in Fresno, California with his partner of many years, originally from Texas, the artist, photographer, scholar of Tibetan Buddhism and literature, the educator D.E. Cordell. Cordell died in January 2024 in Fresno.

== Bibliography ==
=== Books ===
- Zoroastrianism in Armenia (Harvard Iranian Series, 1987), ISBN 0-674-96850-6
- Hovhannes Tlkurantsi and the Mediaeval Armenian Lyric Tradition (University of Pennsylvania Armenian Series, 1987), ISBN 0-89130-930-6
- The Heroes of Kasht (Kasti K'Ajer): An Armenian Epic (Ann Arbor: Caravan, 2000), ISBN 0-88206-099-6
- The Book of Flowers (Belmont, Massachusetts: Armenian Heritage Press, 2003), ISBN 0-935411-17-8, "NELC Newsletter 2004". Archived from the original on October 12, 2007.
- Armenian and Iranian Studies (selected articles, in Harvard Armenian Texts and Studies, 2004), ISBN 0-935411-19-4,, Table of Contents
- Bosphorus Nights: The Complete Lyric Poems of Bedros Tourian (Harvard Armenian Texts and Studies, 2006), ISBN 0-935411-22-4, "A dying adolescent from Constantinople gave birth to the modern poetic language of the Armenians". Archived from the original on September 28, 2007. "Archived copy" (PDF). Archived from the original (PDF) on February 6, 2007.
- Poets, Heroes, and their Dragons (2 vols) (Brill, 2021), ISBN 9789004460737

=== Scholarly articles ===
- "A Poem of Grigor Narekac'i", REArm 19, 1985, pp. 435–439
- "The Name of Zoroaster in Armenian", Journal of the Society for Armenian Studies 2, 1985-1986, pp. 3–10
- "Zoroastrianism as the State Religion of Ancient Iran", Journal of the K. R. Cama Oriental Institute 53, Bombay, 1986, pp. 74–142
- "On St. Grigor Narekatsi, His Sources and His Contemporaries", Armenian Review 41, 2–162, 1988, pp. 59–65
- "Sages and Scribes at the Courts of Ancient Iran", The Sage in Israel and the Ancient Near East, J. Gammie, L. Perdue, eds., Winona Lake: Eisenbrauns, 1990, pp. 141–146
- "Kartîr and Mânî: a Shamanistic Model of Their Conflict", Iranica Varia: Papers in Honor of Professor Ehsan Yarshater, Acta Iranica 30, Leiden: Brill, 1990, pp. 180–193
- "Zoroastrian Elements in the Book of Esther", Irano-Judaica II, S. Shaked, A. Netzer, eds., Jerusalem, 1990, pp. 33–40
- "Two Notes on Biblical Tradition and Native Epic in the 'Book of Lamentation' of St. Grigor Narekac'i", REArm 22, 1990-1991, pp. 135–145
- "Virtue and Its Own Reward: The 38th Meditation of the Book of Lamentations of St. Grigor Narekatsi", Raft 1991, pp. 25–30
- "On Mysticism and Esotericism amongst the Zoroastrians", Iranian Studies 26.1-2, 1993, pp. 73–94
- "The Mother of All Heresies: A Late Mediaeval Armenian Text on the Yushkaparik, REArm 24, 1993, pp. 273-293
- "Problematic Snake Children of Armenia", REArm 25, 1994, pp. 77–96
- "Zoroastrianism and the Northern Qi Panels", Zoroastrian Studies Newsletter, Bombay, 1994
- "A Parthian Bhagavad Gîtâ and its Echoes", From Byzantium to Iran: Armenian Studies in Honour of Nina Garsoian, J.-P. Mahé, R. Thomson, eds., Atlanta: Scholars Press, 1996, pp. 17-35
- "Armenian Spirituality: Liturgical Mysticism and Chapter 33 of the Book of Lamentation of St. Grigor Narekac'i", REArm 26, 1996–1997, pp. 427–439
- "Polyphemos Armenios", REArm 26, 1996-1997, pp. 25-38
- "Scythians and Avesta in an Armenian Vernacular Paternoster", Le Muséon 110.1-2, 1997, pp. 91-114.
- "A Manichaean Apostolic Mission to Armenia?", Proceedings of the Third European Conference of Iranian Studies, 1, N. Sims-Williams, ed., Wiesbaden: L. Reichert, 1998, pp. 21-26
- "Truth Is What the Eye Can See: Armenian Manuscripts and Armenian Spirituality", Treasures in Heaven: Armenian Art, Religion, and Society, T. Mathews, R. Wieck, eds., New York: Pierpont Morgan Library, 1998, pp. 147-162
- "The Armenian Shrines of the Black Youth (t'ux manuk)", Le Muséon 111.3-4, 1998, pp. 319-343
- "An Epic for the Borderlands: Zariadris of Sophene, Aslan the Rebel, Digenes Akrites, and the Mythologem of Alcestis in Armenia", Armenian Tsopk/Kharpert, R. Hovannisian, ed., Costa Mesa, California: Mazda, 1998, pp. 147-183
- "A Scholium on Coleridge and an Armenian Demon", JSAS 10, 1998-99, 2000, pp. 63-71
- "God is Good: On Tobit and Iran", Iran and the Caucasus 5, Tehran, 2001, pp. 1-6
- "The Magi in the Derveni Papyrus", Nâme-ye Irân-e Bâstân 1.1, Tehran, 2001, pp. 49-59
- "Ezekiel and Iran", Irano-Judaica V, Shaul Shaked and Amnon Netzer, eds., Jerusalem: Ben-Zri Institute, 2003, pp. 1-15

=== Representative articles in the Encyclopædia Iranica ===
- Religion of Armenia
- BEHDEN, Zoroastrianism or its adherents
- BOZPAYIT, Body of Zoroastrian teachings in Sasanian period
- BURIAL iii., Zoroastrian burial practices
- CAMA Kharshedji Rustamji, Parsi Zoroastrian scholar and community leader, India, 19th
- CEDRENUS Georgius, Byzentine historian dealing with Zoroaster, 12th
- Christianity in pre-Islamic Persia, literary sources
- AÙAR˜EAN, Linguist, Armenian, 19th 20th
- ATRUˆAN, Fire temple, a Parthian loanword in Armenian
- ÙAÚDOR ii., Veil, among Zoroastrians and Parsis
- AÚL, Child-stealing demon
- ANUˆAWAN, Legendary king of Armenia
- ARA the Beautiful, Mythical king of Armenia
- ARLEZ, Armenian term for a supernatural creature
- ARTAXIAS I, Founder of Artaxiad dynasty in Armenia, 2nd BC
- AÛDAHAÚ iv., Dragon in Armenia
- BAAT ii. Armenian Bat
- BÈNAMAÚZÈ i., Menstruant woman, Zoroastrian concept for ritual
- BURDAR, Armenian proper name for a Persian nobleman, 4th
- CUPBEARER, Ancient Armenian function of a courtier

=== Popular articles ===
- An Essay on the Origins of The Armenian People (1981)
- Letter to The New York Review of Books, The New York Review of Books, 9 August 2001.
- O Captain! My Captain!, The Harvard Crimson, Friday, March 03, 2006. On the resignation of former President of Harvard University Larry Summers
- Ideology over Integrity in Academe, The Current, Columbia University, Fall 2007 issue.
