= Vrej Nersessian =

Vrej Nersessian (Armenian: Վրէժ Ներսէսեան; born 15 December 1948) was the Curator of the Christian Middle East Section (Asia, Pacific and African Collections) at the British Library, London, from 1975 to 2012.

== Life ==
Born Vrej Nersessian in Teheran, he took the name Nerses on ordination in 1983 as a priest of the Armenian Apostolic Church.

He holds a doctorate in theology from King's College London, writes on the Christian Middle East, and is the author of a number of works on Armenian Christian art and Christianity, including Treasures from the Ark: 1700 Years of Armenian Christian Art (The British Library, 2001), The Bible in the Armenian Tradition (The J. Paul Getty Museum, 2001), the Armenian Illuminated Gospel Books (The British Library, 1987), and The Tondrakian Movement (Kahn & Averill, 1987).

He is married and has two sons.
