= St. Husik I =

Husik I or Yusik (Armenian: Հուսիկ (reformed); Յուսիկ (classical); c. 295 – 347) was hereditary patriarch of the Armenian Church of the Gregorid line during the reign of the Arsacid king Tiran (r. 341–347?). He was the son of Vrtanes I, his predecessor as patriarch, and the grandson of Gregory the Illuminator, the founder of the Armenian Church. His patriarchate is dated to 341–347. He came into conflict with the monarchy and was assassinated on the king's orders. He is venerated as a saint in the Armenian Church.

== Name ==
The name Husik (Classical Armenian Yusik) derives from the Armenian word yoys (modern Armenian huys), meaning 'hope', with the diminutive suffix -ik attached. The name is sometimes connected with the Greek name Hesychius.

== Biography ==
Husik was the son of Vrtanes I and the grandson of the apostle of Armenia, Gregory the Illuminator. He was the twin brother of Grigoris, who was martyred in Caucasian Albania (died c. 330–340). His birth year is variously given as 295 or 305. According to the Armenian history traditionally attributed to Faustus of Byzantium (also known as Buzandaran Patmutʻiwnkʻ), Husik was raised and educated at the court of the Armenian king Tiran (r. 341–347?) and was married at a young age to Tiran's daughter. He had two sons with the Arsacid princess: Pap and Atanagines, who married Tiran's sisters Varazdukht and Bambishn, respectively. Since this means that Pap and Atanagines married their own great-aunts, Cyril Toumanoff suggests that Husik actually married the daughter of the earlier king Trdat the Great (Tiran's grandfather). Nina Garsoïan notes that these marriages may indicate the continuation of the Zoroastrian practice of consanguineous marriage in early Christian Armenia.

He became the new patriarch (Note: The term patriarch has commonly been used for Gregory and his successors in Armenian sources since the fifth century, although, as Robert W. Thomson notes, it is anachronistic for the situation in the fourth century. Until the death of Nerses I in the 370s, the Armenian bishops were under the authority of the metropolitans of Caesarea.) of the Armenian Church after his father and reigned from 341 until 347. (Note: This dating is based on the information given in Movses Khorenatsi's history. The Buzandaran Patmutʻiwnkʻ gives no information about the dates of Husik's patriarchate.) He was consecrated at Caesarea in Cappadocia like his predecessors. Both the Buzandaran Patmutʻiwnkʻ and the Armenian historian Movses Khorenatsi describe as a virtuous patriarch like his father and grandfather. According to the Buzandaran Patmutʻiwnkʻ, Husik denounced the evils of King Tiran and the Armenian magnates. One day, Husik tried to prevent Tiran and his associates from entering the church at the fortress of Bnabegh in Sophene during a festival. Tiran had Husik clubbed inside the church for this. Husik was then taken to Tordan in Daranaghik, one of the holdings of the Gregorid house, where he died of his wounds and was buried near his father and grandfather. Movses Khorenatsi writes that Husik was whipped to death on Tiran's orders after the patriarch destroyed an image of the Roman emperor Julian that Tiran had put up in the church; Garsoïan considers this version unlikely.

Garsoïan attributes Husik's conflict with Tiran to the latter's favoring of Arianism, whereas the Gregorid patriarchs adhered to the orthodox, anti-Arian position established at the Council of Nicaea. Hakob Harutyunyan writes that the conflict was a result of Tiran's attempts to curb the power of the Church, taking advantage of the stable internal and international situation.

Husik was not succeeded by his sons Pap and Atanagines, reportedly because of their unworthiness for the position. He was succeeded by the chorbishop Daniel, a Syrian who was soon also killed on Tiran's orders and is not included in the list of Armenian patriarchs. Thus, Husik's successor is considered to be Pharen I. Husik's grandson through Atanagines, named Nerses, would later become patriarch. Husik is venerated as a saint in the Armenian Church. His saint's day is celebrated on the Saturday succeeding the third Sunday of Christmas or on the Saturday succeeding the third Sunday of Vardavar, along with the other "sons and grandchildren" of Gregory the Illuminator.

== Sources ==
- Acharian, Hrachia (1946). "Yusik" Յուսիկ. Hayotsʻ andznanunneri baṛaran Հայոց անձնանունների բառարան [Dictionary of Armenian given names] (in Armenian). Vol. III. Yerevan: Petakan hamalsarani hratarakchʻutʻyun. pp. 732-736.
- Agathangelos (1976). History of the Armenians. Translation, introduction and commentary by Robert W. Thomson (First ed.). Albany: State University of New York Press. ISBN 0-87395-323-1.
- Toumanoff, C. (1976). Manuel de généalogie et de chronologie pour le Caucase chrétien (Arménie, Géorgie, Albanie). Rome: Edizioni Aquila.
- Moses Khorenatsʻi (1978). History of the Armenians. Translation, introduction and commentary by Robert W. Thomson. Cambridge, Massachusetts: Harvard University Press. ISBN 0-674-39571-9.
- The Epic Histories Attributed to Pʻawstos Buzand (Buzandaran Patmutʻiwnkʻ). Translation, introduction and commentary by Nina G. Garsoïan. Cambridge, Massachusetts: Harvard University Press. 1989. ISBN 0-674-25865-7.
- Ayvazyan, Hovhannes, ed. (2002). Kʻristonya Hayastan hanragitaran Քրիստոնյա Հայաստան հանրագիտարան [Christian Armenia encyclopedia] (PDF) (in Armenian). Yerevan: Haykakan hanragitaran hratarakchʻutʻyun. ISBN 9785897000166.

Preceded by St. Vrtanes I	Catholicos of the Holy See of St. Echmiadzin and All Armenians; 341–347	Succeeded by Daniel
