= Aristaces I =

Aristaces or Aristakes I (Armenian: Արիստակէս Ա, romanized: Aristakēs) was the second Catholicos (Note: The term catholicos or patriarch has commonly been used for Gregory and his successors in Armenian sources since the fifth century, although, as Robert W. Thomson notes, it is anachronistic for the situation in the fourth century. Until the death of Nerses I in the 370s, the Armenian bishops were under the authority of the metropolitans of Caesarea.) of the Armenian Church from 325 until his death in 333. He was the younger son and successor of Gregory the Illuminator, the founder and first head of the Armenian Church and his wife, Julitta (or Mariam) of Armenia.

Most of the information about Aristaces's life comes from the fifth-century Armenian history attributed to Agathangelos. Aristaces was born in Caesarea of Cappadocia to Gregory the Illuminator and his wife Julitta (or Mariam) of Armenia. He is said to have entered a monastery with his mother as a child after his father left for Armenia. When Aristaces grew up, he went under the tutelage of a monk called Nicomachus, who sent him to live as an ascetic in the desert. Around 325, when Gregory wished to give up the Catholicosate in favor of a life as a hermit, King Tiridates III of Armenia sent for Aristaces and his brother Vrtanes and had them brought to Armenia to take over leadership of the Church.

In 325, Aristaces was sent as the Armenian representative to the First Council of Nicaea and brought back the Nicene canons; his signature appears among those of the bishops who participated in the council. Aristaces is also said to have participated in an embassy together with Gregory and King Tiridates to the newly converted Roman emperor Constantine the Great, although this is considered "purely legendary" by scholar Robert W. Thomson.

Agathangelos writes nothing about Aristaces's death. Faustus of Byzantium writes that Aristaces died "a confessor's death" but gives no further details, while Movses Khorenatsi claims that he was murdered in Sophene by a governor named Archilaeus in retaliation for being reprimanded by the Catholicos. According to Khorenatsi and Faustus, Aristaces was buried in the town of Til in the district of Acilisene, although in a different chapter Faustus gives the alternative burial site of Tordan in the district of Daranali, where Gregory is said to have been buried.

== See also ==
- Gregorids

== Sources ==
- Garsoïan, Nina G. (1989). The Epic Histories Attributed to Pʻawstos Buzand (Buzandaran Patmutʻiwnkʻ). Cambridge, Massachusetts: Harvard University Press. ISBN 0-674-25865-7.
- Agathangelos (1976). History of the Armenians (in xcl and English). Translation and commentary by Robert W. Thomson. Albany: State University of New York Press. ISBN 0-87395-323-1.
- Moses Khorenatsʻi (1978). History of the Armenians. Translation and commentary by Robert W. Thomson. Cambridge, Massachusetts: Harvard University Press. ISBN 0-674-39571-9.

Preceded by St. Gregory the Enlightener	Catholicos of the Holy See of St. Echmiadzin and All Armenians; 325–333	Succeeded by St. Vrtanes I
