= Daniel I of Armenia =

4th-century Catholicoi of Armenia

Daniel I of Armenia (Armenian: Դանիել Ա) was the 16th Catholicos-Patriarch of the Armenian Apostolic Church. He was a Syrian who reigned as the Catholicoi after the reign of four hereditary Parthian catholicoi (St. Gregory I the Enlightener, his son St. Aristaces I, St. Vrtanes I and St. Husik I. He only ruled less than one year in 347 AD and was succeeded by Pharen I of Armenia.

Daniel was an ethnic Syriac and a disciple of Gregory the Illuminator. After King Tiran ordered the death of Catholicos Husik, he requested Daniel to replace him. However, Daniel refused the appointment and accused the King of a lavish lifestyle. Angered by Daniel's response, the King ordered that Daniel should be strangled.

== Notes ==
Preceded by St. Husik I	Catholicos of the Holy See of St. Echmiadzin and All Armenians; 347	Succeeded by Pharen I of Armenia
