= Acilisene =

Region in ancient Armenia

Acilisene (Ancient Greek: Ἀκιλισηνή, romanized: Akilisēnḗ), known as Ekegheats or Yekeghyats (Old Armenian: Եկեղեաց, romanized: Ekełeac’) in Armenian, was a region of the Upper Armenia province of historical Armenia. It was a strip of land along the Upper Euphrates or Arsanias roughly corresponding to today's Erzincan Province of Turkey. Its main cities were Erznka (today's Erzincan, Turkey) and Ani-Kamakh (today's Kemah, Turkey) near the ancient necropolis of the Arsacid kings of Armenia. According to Strabo, Acilisene was situated along the Euphrates between Derxene and the river's bend near Dostal, while in the south it bordered on Sophene. Hellenistic Acilisene constituted a considerably vaster district than it would later become, encompassing the territories that would eventually be subdivided into the cantons of Aghyun, Daranali, Mananaghi, Mzur, and Yekeghyats.

The Erznka valley, crossed by the Upper Euphrates, was the location of the most important pre-Christian shrine in Armenia, dedicated to the Armenian goddess Anahit. The temple, whose site has not yet been identified, was in a settlement called Erez. Because of its association with the goddess, the region was also called Anahtakan ('of Anahit', corresponding to the Latin Anaetica, itself from Anaïtis, the name of the goddess in Latin and Greek classical sources).

Under the Arsacid dynasty, it was one of the properties of the house of Gregory the Illuminator (the Gregorids) and was sometimes called Gavar Lusavorchi ('district of the Illuminator').

== See also ==
- List of regions of ancient Armenia
