= Daniel I =

Daniel I may refer to:

- Daniel I of Armenia (ruled 347)
- Archbishop Danilo I of the Serbian Orthodox Church (ruled 1271–1272)
- Daniel of Moscow (1261–1303)
- Daniel I of Kongo (ruled 1674–78)
- Metropolitan Danilo I Petrović-Njegoš (1670–1735)
- Danilo I, Prince of Montenegro (1826–1860)
- Danilo, Crown Prince of Montenegro (1871–1939)
- Patriarch Daniel of Romania (b. 1951)
