= Aristakes =

Aristakes may refer to:

- St. Aristaces I, son of Gregory the Illuminator
- Aristakes Lastivertsi, medieval Armenian historian and chronicler
