= Julitta of Armenia =

Early Christian

- Spouse(s): Gregory the Illuminator
- Children: St. Vrtanes I, Aristaces I

Julitta of Armenia (Armenian: Ժուլիտտա), also known as Mariam of Armenia (Armenian: Մարիամ), was a figure of early Christianity. While her name and identity are difficult to establish, she is recognized as the wife of Gregory the Illuminator and the founding mother of the Gregorid dynasty, being the mother of Aristaces I and Vrtanes I.

== Biography ==
=== Onomastic issues ===
While it is evident that Gregory the Illuminator was a married bishop, the name of his wife is very difficult to establish. In Agathangelos' work, both in the Greek and Armenian versions, she is named Julitta. In the 7th century, three centuries later, Movses Khorenatsi instead gave her the name Mariam. Thus, it remains particularly challenging to determine the original name of this figure, especially since Julitta, the earliest attested name, seems to be a confusion with a Cappadocian saint who died nearly 100 years before Gregory the Illuminator and is recognized for her maternal qualities in Christian hagiographies.

=== Life ===
As with her name, her life is particularly difficult to establish. She seems to be of Byzantine origin, according to Agathangelos, who mentions that she married Gregory the Illuminator and had already given birth to their two sons in Caesarea before Gregory moved to Armenia. In the two versions of Agathangelos' work, there is a significant difference; in the Greek version, which is older and less revised by Armenian ecclesiastical authorities, she followed Gregory to Armenia after his release by Tiridates, while in the Armenian version, more revised, she never joined him from the moment he started preaching. This discrepancy might have been an attempt to conceal Gregory's marriage by artificially separating it from his life as a bishop. Robert W. Thomson, who studied the different versions of Agathangelos, sees this concealment as a desire of the Armenian Apostolic Church to present Gregory as a monastic figure who could not be married, or from whom all ties to any marriage must be erased, especially from the moment he began to preach. However, the Greek version seems more accurate in this regard, and while the given name is not clear, the subsequent events, where she joined her husband after his release and the beginning of the destruction of pagan temples, seems correct.

In contrast, Movses Khorenatsi mentioned that she was given in marriage to Gregory by a pious man named David, without further details of place or date.

Although her life is complex to approach and accurately grasp, due to very incomplete or contradictory primary sources, she gave birth to Aristaces I and Vrtanes I in Caesarea and thus, with her husband, founded the Gregorid dynasty, which later played a major role in the history of Armenia.
