= Leontius of Caesarea =

Saint Leontius of Caesarea
- Died: ~337 AD
- Venerated in: Armenian Apostolic Church; Roman Catholic Church; Eastern Orthodox Church
- Feast: January 13 Roman Catholic Church; February 18 Armenian Apostolic Church

Leontius of Caesarea (died 337) was a bishop of Caesarea Mazaca, in Cappadocia. He was childhood friends with Gregory the Illuminator, later in life Leontius would consecrate Gregory to become the patriarch of the Armenians. Leontius attended the First Council of Nicaea in 325.

The Eastern Orthodox Church describes him as an "angel of peace." His feast day is 13 January.
