= St. Vrtanes I =

Saint Vrtanes I
- Born: 262; Caesarea
- Died: 341 (aged 78–79)
- Children: Grigoris and St. Husik I
- Father: Gregory the Illuminator

Vrtanes, also known as Vrt'anes or Saint Vrtanes (Armenian: Սբ. Վրթանէս Ա. Պարթև), was the 14th Catholicos-Patriarch of the Armenian Apostolic Church serving from 333 until his death in 341.

He was born in Caesarea in 262. The elder son of Julitta (or Mariam) of Armenia and Gregory the Illuminator. He married and had twin sons, Grigoris and St. Husik I. In 310, he went to Armenia with his sons, aged ten or twelve, and younger brother, St. Aristaces I.

In 333, aged 70, Vrtanes succeeded Aristaces as third in line in the then-hereditary Gregorid line of the Catholicos of the Armenian Catholic Church.

He died of natural causes on 341, aged around 80, and was buried in Thordan, Daranaghik. He was succeeded as Catholicos-Patriarch by his eldest son, St. Husik I.

Preceded by St. Aristaces I	Catholicos of the Holy See of St. Echmiadzin and All Armenians; 333–341	Succeeded by St. Husik I
