= Theodore Psalter =

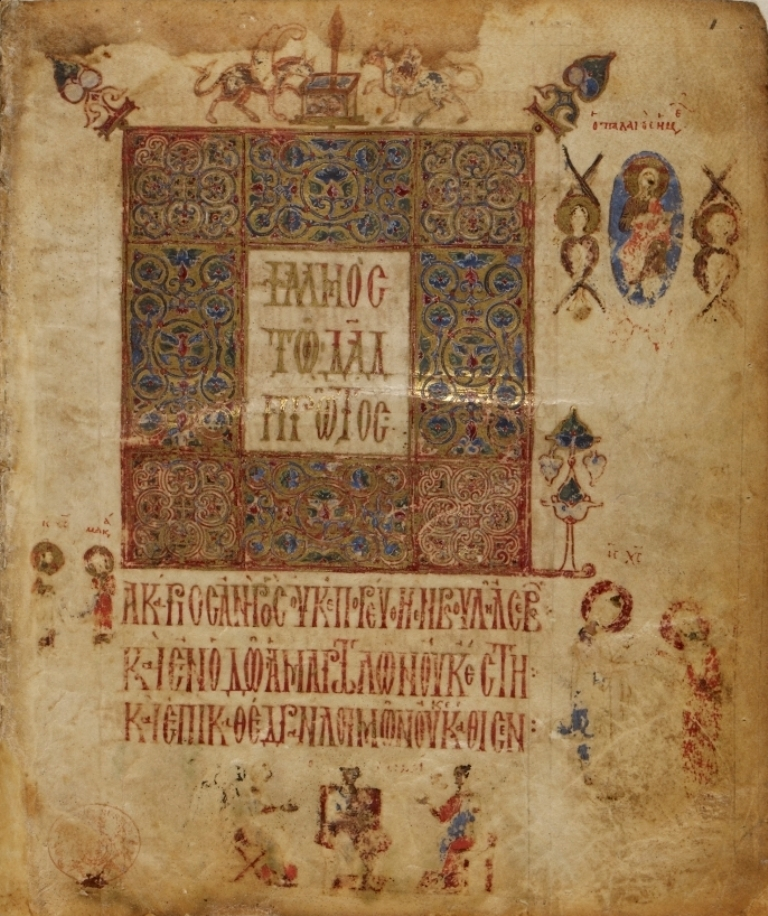
Cover of the Theodore Psalter

The Theodore Psalter is an illustrated manuscript and compilation of the Psalms and the canticles, or Odes from the Old Testament. "This Psalter has been held in the British Library since 1853 as Additional 19.352," wrote Princeton Art History professor Charles Barber in his first essay that is a companion to the Theodore Psalter E-Facsimile. Barber called the Psalter, "One of the richest illuminated manuscripts to survive from Byzantium."

He goes on to say, "This essay will introduce a number of the various approaches that have been brought to bear upon this work. In reviewing these wide-ranging approaches it will be possible both to define the questions that have shaped the reception of this work and to formulate some possibilities for future research."

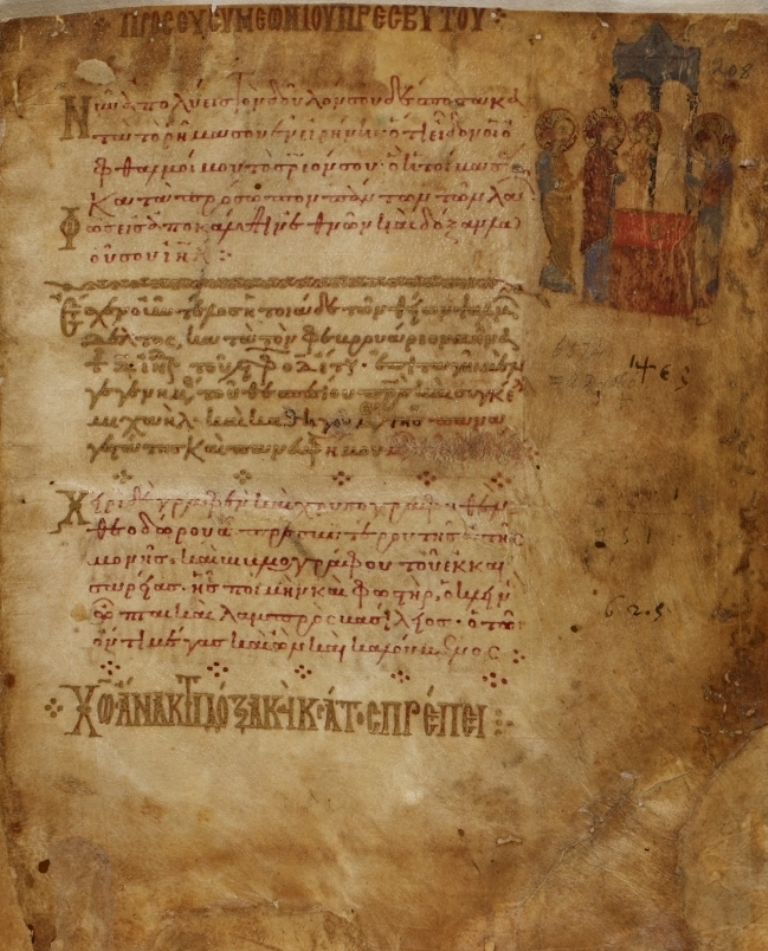
Colophon of the Theodore Psalter--MS 19352, f 208

== The Psalter ==
The Psalms are a book within the Old Testament, written in metered verse, or twelve-syllable poetic lines, and are thought to be musical. They have been compared to a harp, or other instruments of music. Byzantine psalters stand out historically because of the religious and spiritual artistic qualities the Byzantine Empire was known for. This includes images and icons painted by hand. The art within the Byzantine psalters were specifically unique because of the history surrounding the creation and use of images two centuries before during opposition to icons in the Iconoclastic controversy.

A psalter is a book made specifically to contain the 150 psalms from the book of Psalms. Psalters have also included the odes or canticles, which are songs or prayers in song form from the Old Testament. Psalters were created purely for liturgical purposes, and the Psalms were the most popular books of the Old Testament in Byzantium.

The Oxford Dictionary of Byzantium observed, "Like a garden, the book of Psalms contains, and puts in musical form everything that is to be found in other books, and shows, in addition, its own particular qualities." Additionally, psalters could be used as a form of guided prayer or meditation.

== Theodore the Scribe ==
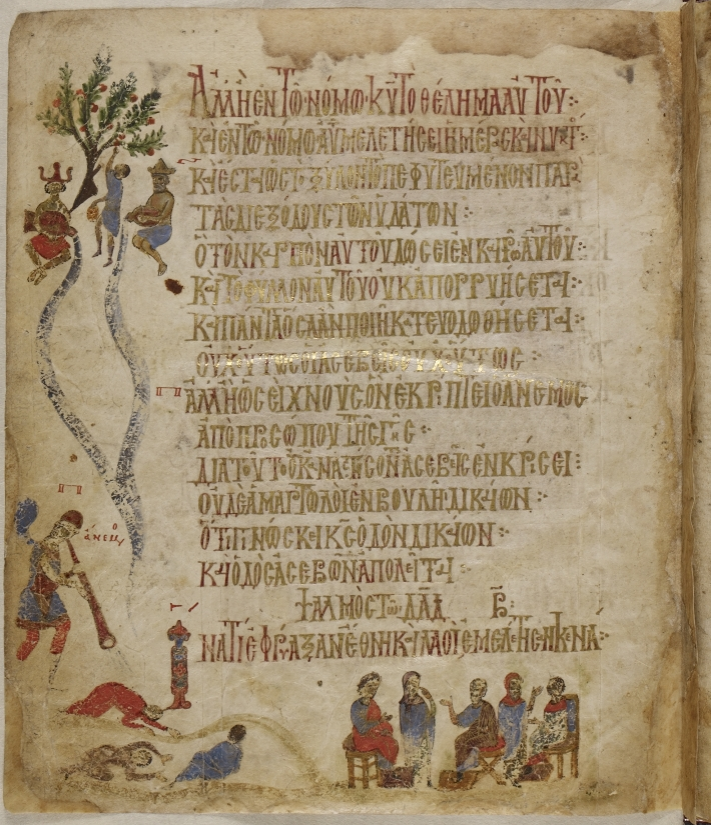
Theodore Psalter MS 19352, ff 191v-192

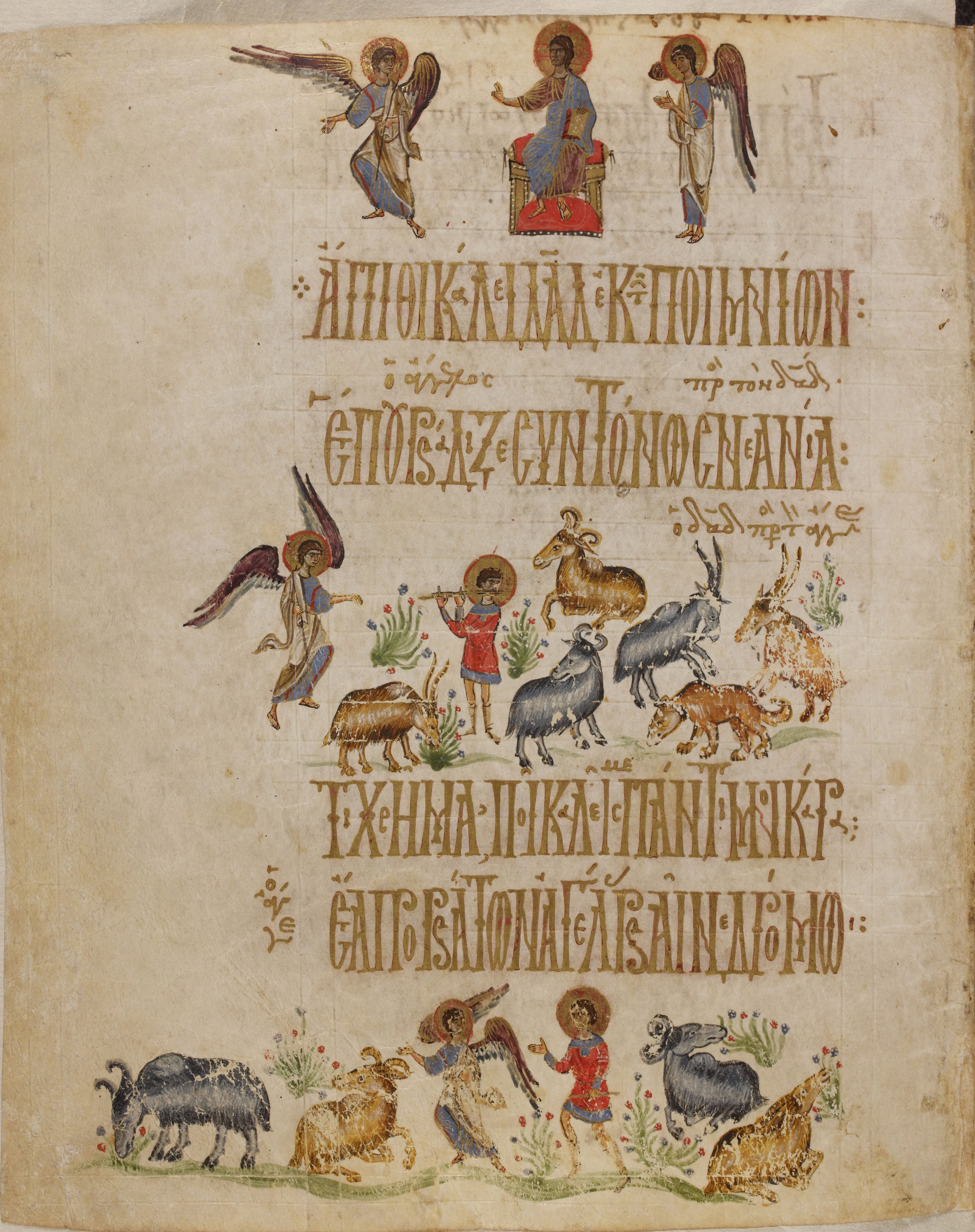
Theodore Psalter MS 19352, ff 189v-191

Barber wrote in "Essay One" of the Theodore Psalter E-Facsimile, "Completed in Constantinople in February 1066, the 208 folios of this manuscript include 440 separate images, making this the most fully illuminated Psalter to come down from the Byzantine Empire."

He further writes, "Before entering upon this historiographical discussion the manuscript itself should be introduced. In recent years this Psalter has come to be known as the Theodore Psalter, a name that memorializes the scribe mentioned in the manuscript's colophon, (folio 208r). In its modern binding, the manuscript is 208 folios in length and gathered into twenty-six quires. Each quire is numbered in the lower margin of its opening folio (except where cut) in carmine and black and on the final folio in black."

Barber adds, "The prayer of dedication and the colophon found that the final opening of the manuscript (folios 207v-208r) provide precise information on the production of this manuscript. The colophon, written on folio 208r can be translated as follows: "This volume of the divine Psalms was completed in the month of February of the fourth indiction of the year 6574 [i.e. 1066 C.E.] on the order of the divinely inspired felker and synkellos Michael, abbot of the all-holy and all-blessed monastery."

Barber added, "The name of the monastery is lost, but from other evidence within the manuscript we know that it was the Stoudios Monastery in Constantinople." The second part of the colophon reads,

"Written and written in gold by the hand of Theodore the protopresbyter of this monastery and scribe from Caesarea, whose shepherd and luminary was the glorious and brilliant Basil, who was truly great and was also so named."

Professor Barber continues, "First, there is Theodore from Caesaera. He describes himself as an archpriest and scribe of the monastery. Furthermore, he has defined himself within this last role in two ways: he has both written and written in gold this manuscript. Clearly, Theodore should be identified with the hands-on production of this work. The second name is the abbot of the monastery, Michael, who is described as the divinely inspired father and synkellos of the monastery and about whom we have no other firm information. The colophon shows that Michael is to be understood as the patron of this book, which was made at his order.

The Stoudios Monastery was known for its rigorous academic and artistic excellence, and especially in the Byzantine style of religious icons. A protopresbyteros is an archpriest—a kind of clerk and monk.

== Liturgy and the Psalms ==
The Byzantine Empire witnessed a very prolific movement in the creation of art. The legalization of Christianity by Emperor Constantine in 313 inspired works of art linked to this new religious movement, specifically icons, and they became very popular, and the quintessential art form from Byzantine. Church services created and inspired by religious devotion were called liturgical services. Liturgy was the concept behind icons, ceremonies or rituals, and the creation of religious books. The act of reading the Psalms was not new. It was thought that icons created a mental universe for the reader imbued with images derived from texts.

Art History Professor Herbert L. Kessler believes such manuscripts were created to transport the reader to a different place, a place with high spiritual aspirations. He mentions an illuminated manuscript, the Gospel of St. Luke, and writes, "This eleventh-century manuscript demonstrates a trend of the High Middle Ages in which transcendental contemplation was initiated by abstract means. Here, thin washes of celestial colors elevate the animal flesh itself, the vellum on which words and pictures are elsewhere inscribed, to guide the viewer's thoughts from the physical world toward (though not all the way to) the invisible God."

== Illustrations and images ==
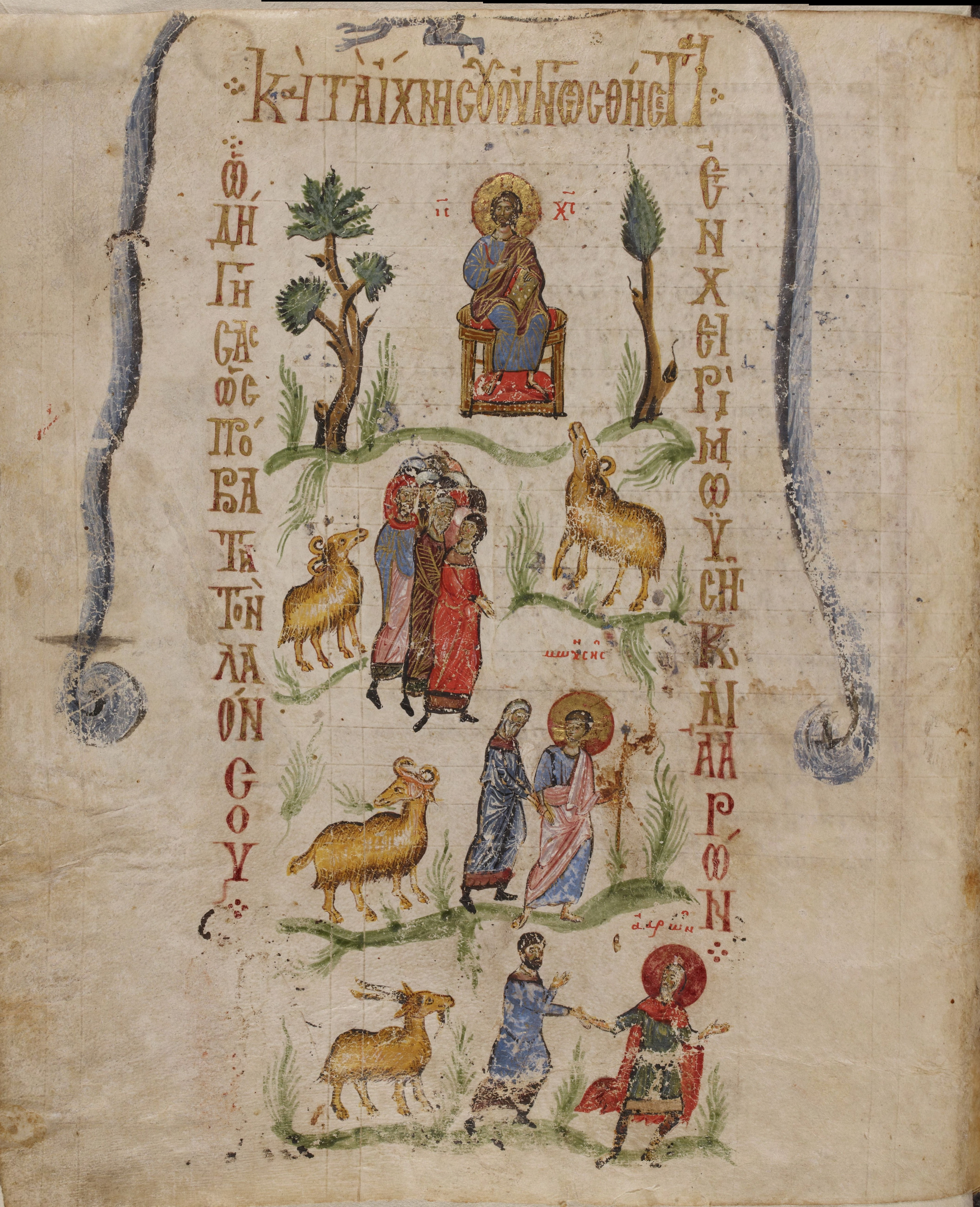
Theodore Psalter--Courtesy of the British Library; London, U.K.

The Theodore Psalter features 440 miniatures, or illustrations. They are ‘marginal’ miniatures; they appear in the margins of the book. The miniatures include illustrations from the Gospels, liturgical illustrations and hagiographical miniatures, or stories about Christ. The word miniature means illustration, and originates with the word minium, which had nothing to do with size or the word ‘minimum’. Instead, the word refers to the red lead of the pencils used in the 9th century for these psalters. Throughout the psalter there are both red and blue lines connecting the miniatures to text, much like the way we today link text to photos or other websites.

The Theodore Psalter miniatures convey allegorical meaning from the Psalms or the Odes, and have "an extra layer of meaning supplied by images displaying vigorous anti-Iconoclastic propaganda". One example is Mathew commenting on the Psalms.

There are animals: goats and dogs: mice and birds including pelicans; a dragon and unicorn; and a Tree of Life. There are men playing music, and vegetation.

Professor Barber continues his commentary on the Psalter, "The image and prayer on folio 207v develop our understanding of Michael's possession of the book. A blessing bust of Christ can be assumed in the medallion. Below and to the right is a standing figure of David, clearly labeled, wearing royal costume and carrying a psaltery. Between them, and now almost lost, is the faint trace of a third figure. This bearded man carries a book in his left hand, looks up toward Christ, and gestures with his right hand. He is identified by the text written around him: "Our most Holy Father Michael, the abbot and synkellos, the Stoudite says...He says, "Savior, take hold of the finished book of your prophet and wise king." The image and text together indicate that the Psalter is shown in the left hand of Michael. David is identified as the author of the Psalms, but it is Michael who possesses, for the moment, the Psalter. (see Essay 3). It is his to give to Christ. The manuscript's final opening provides a writer-producer (Theodore), a patron-possessor (Michael), an ordinary author (David), and a national recipient (Christ). In addition, the texts indicate that the manuscript was completed in February 1066. Taken together, this information provides rare precise details on the location of the production and the possession of a Byzantine Illuminated manuscript. As such, the Theodore Psalter necessarily provides a fixed point in any discussion of eleventh-century Constantinopolitan illumination."

This kind of scene occurs throughout the Psalter, and there are surprising examples.

Professor Robin Cormack writes in his book Byzantine Art about the Theodore Psalter. Patriarch Nikephoros, an Orthodox patriarch who supported the use of icons 250 years before, during the Iconoclastic Debate, appears in the text, and there are conversations, but there is a surprising twist. He is replaced by a monk who had lived at the monastery at the same time. That monk was Theodore the Studite who was made a saint after his death, and who had been persecuted for actively supporting the making and the using icons.

Professor Cormack writes, "The prominent role of Patriarch Nikephoros, as triumphant iconophile is replaced with portraits of the monk St. Theodore the Studite. Natural though it was to celebrate a past member of the community in which the manuscript was made, it slants the opposition to iconoclasm away from patriarch to monk."

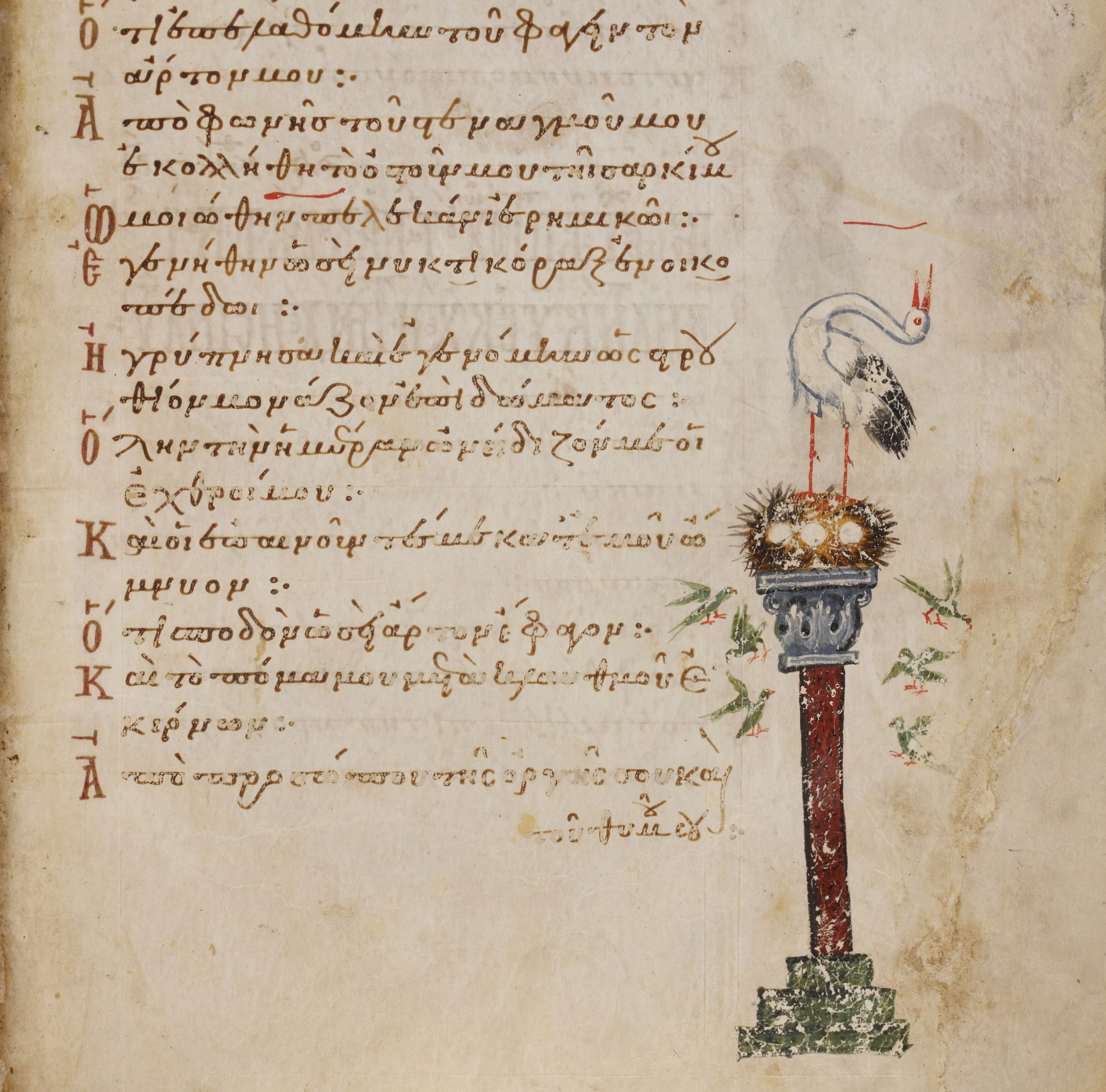
Miniature from the Theodore Psalter. Courtesy of the British Library.

There is another interesting detail, and that is the image of the pelican in the manuscript. Eriko Tsuji wrote an article about the Theodore Psalter and the appearance of the image of a pelican, " Where both the Chludov (Moscow, Historical Museum, 129d) and the Barberini Psalters show a bird nesting on a column as an illustration of Psalms 103:17 ("There the sparrows will build their nests; and the house of the heron takes the lead among them," the Theodore Psalter has precisely the same composition at Psalms 101:7, "I have become like a pelican of the wilderness; I have become like an owl in the ruined house"). Theodore must have moved the miniature intentionally because he added a new motif instead of the bird on a column as an illustration of Psalms 103:17. The illustration of the bird on a column was regarded as a pelican in the Theodore Psalter because of the relationship to the word "Pelican" in the text. Though the miniature of the pelican itself is now lost, we have a photograph of the miniature of Crucifixion interpreting a fable of the pelican. It is obvious among the monks of the monastery that the pelican can be considered as an image of the Passion of Christ. The miniature cycle of the Theodore Psalter was devised for the abbot of the monastery. By examining the miniatures as a product of the highly intellectual culture of the monastery, we can speculate that the modification by Theodore is a reflection of the interests and concerns of the Stoudios monastery in the eleventh century."

== Experience of the Icon ==
Art historian and Stanford professor Bissera Pentcheva points out that the icon must be experienced with the senses:

"Focusing on the Byzantine icon, this study plunges into the realm of senses and performative objects. To us, the Greek word for icon, designates portraits of Christ, Mary, angels, saints, and prophets painted in encaustic or tempera on wooden boards. By contrast, eikon in Byzantium had a wide semantic spectrum ranging from hallowed bodies permeated by the Spirit, such as the Stylite saintes or the Eucharist, to imprinted images on the surfaces of metal, stone, and earth. Eikon designated matter imbued with divine pneuma, releasing charis, or grace. As matter, this object was meant to be physically experienced. Touch, smell, taste, and sound were part of "seeing" an eikon."

== Text and Script ==
There are two kinds of script used in the Theodore Psalter. One is called majuscule, and is a kind of calligraphy consisting of large or upper case letters. In the Theodore Psalter the majuscule lettering appears in gold. The other kind of text or script used in the manuscript is a smaller text called minuscule. It is also a kind of calligraphy established in the 8th and 9th century by Charlemagne and revived during the Italian Renaissance. Minuscule is the foundational script that forms the basis of the present day Roman upper and lower case type. These small letters appear in red and gold throughout the text, and the cover has those same colors in majuscule.

Professor Barber adds, "the predominant script is a minuscule perlschrift typical of the eleventh century. A gilded majuscule is used for emphasized passages and titles. The text is written beneath the ruled line in brown ink, although certain passages, titles, and initial letters of Psalm verses are written in gold on carmine ink. A varied system of marks in carmine or blue link text and image is in this manuscript." Barber adds that the (ruling) pattern is relatively uncommon. "The text block is ruled for a single column of text and measures approximately 10.6 cm by 15.2 cm. The number of text lines varies between twenty and twenty-four; normally these are consistent within a quire. The Psalter contains 151 Psalms (folios 1-189r), a unique twelve-syllable poem on the early life of David (folios 189v-191r), a prayer for the abbot of a monastery (folios 191v-192), ten biblical odes (folios 192v-208r), and a dedication and colophon (folios 207v and 208r). The Psalms and Odes are numbered next to their titles and the Psalm text is divided into hathismata and doxai, reflecting common monastic practice. Numerous initial letters are ornamented, although the significance of the distribution of these letters is not disclosed by their occurrence."

== Combinations of Art and Text in the Theodore Psalter ==
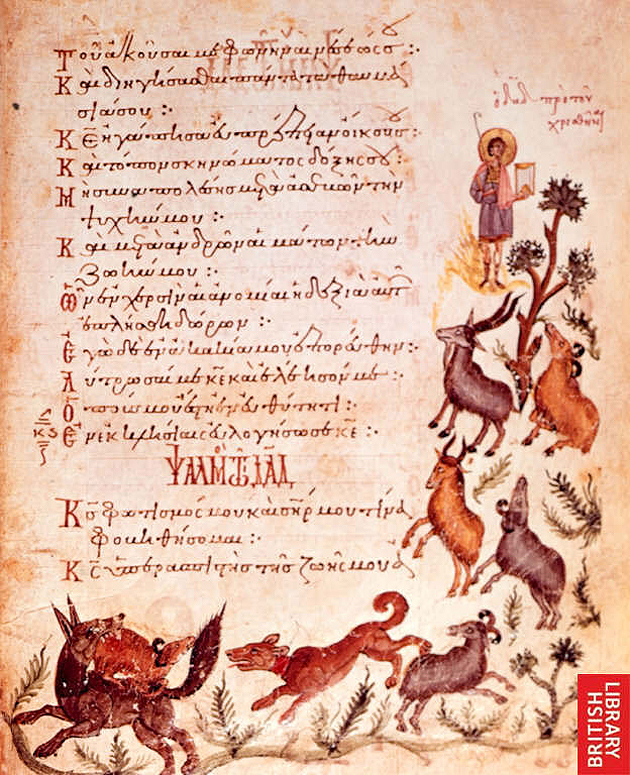
Theodore Psalter-Courtesy of the British Library; London, U.K.

The relationship of icons and text, especially religious text, is an ongoing topic of interest to scholars.

Professor Liz James writes: "Art and text, the interface between images and words, is one of the oldest issues in art history. Are works of art and writings different but parallel forms of expression? Are they intertwined and interdependent?

She goes on to ask, "Can art ever stand alone and apart from text or is it always enmeshed in the meanings expressed in the written and the oral that make it perpetually exposed to subjective interpretation? Byzantium was a culture in which the interactions between word and image underpinned, in many ways, the whole meaning of art. For the Byzantines, as a People of the Book, the interface between images and words, and, above all, Christ, the Word of God, was crucial. The dynamic between art and text in Byzantium is essential for understanding Byzantine society, where the correct relationship between the two was critical to the well being of the state."

== British Library ==
The Theodore Psalter is now in the British Library in London. A great deal of work has gone into preserving and digitizing this psalter, now almost a thousand years old.
