= Daranali =

Daranali or Daranaghi (Armenian: Դարանաղի) was a district (gavar) of the province of Upper Armenia of Greater Armenia. It was located in the basin of the Western Euphrates (Karasu), near modern-day Kemah (Kamakh, Kamacha, Camachus), Turkey. Its center was the fortified settlement of Ani (not to be confused with the medieval Armenian capital), which was located on the right bank of the Western Euphrates, across from Kemah. It was famous for its fertile lands, plentiful waters and salt mines.

It likely fell into the region of Acilisene (later Ekegheatsʻ) mentioned in Strabo's Geography. It is first mentioned in Armenian sources by Faustus of Byzantium, who describes it and the district of Ekegheatsʻ as the property of Gregory the Illuminator's family. Daranali is most famous for having contained the burial-place of the Arsacid Armenian kings at Ani. It was also a major religious center in pagan times, as it was home to a temple to Aramazd at Ani and a temple to Mihr at Bagayarichʻ built by Tigranes the Great. The entire district may have belonged to the temple of Mihr. Following the adoption of Christianity as the state religion of Armenia in the 4th century, the temple at Bagayarichʻ was destroyed by Gregory the Illuminator and Daranali became the property of the Armenian church.

== See also ==
- List of regions of ancient Armenia
