= Gregory the Illuminator =

Patron saint of the Armenian Apostolic Church (c.257–c.331)

Saint Gregory the Illuminator
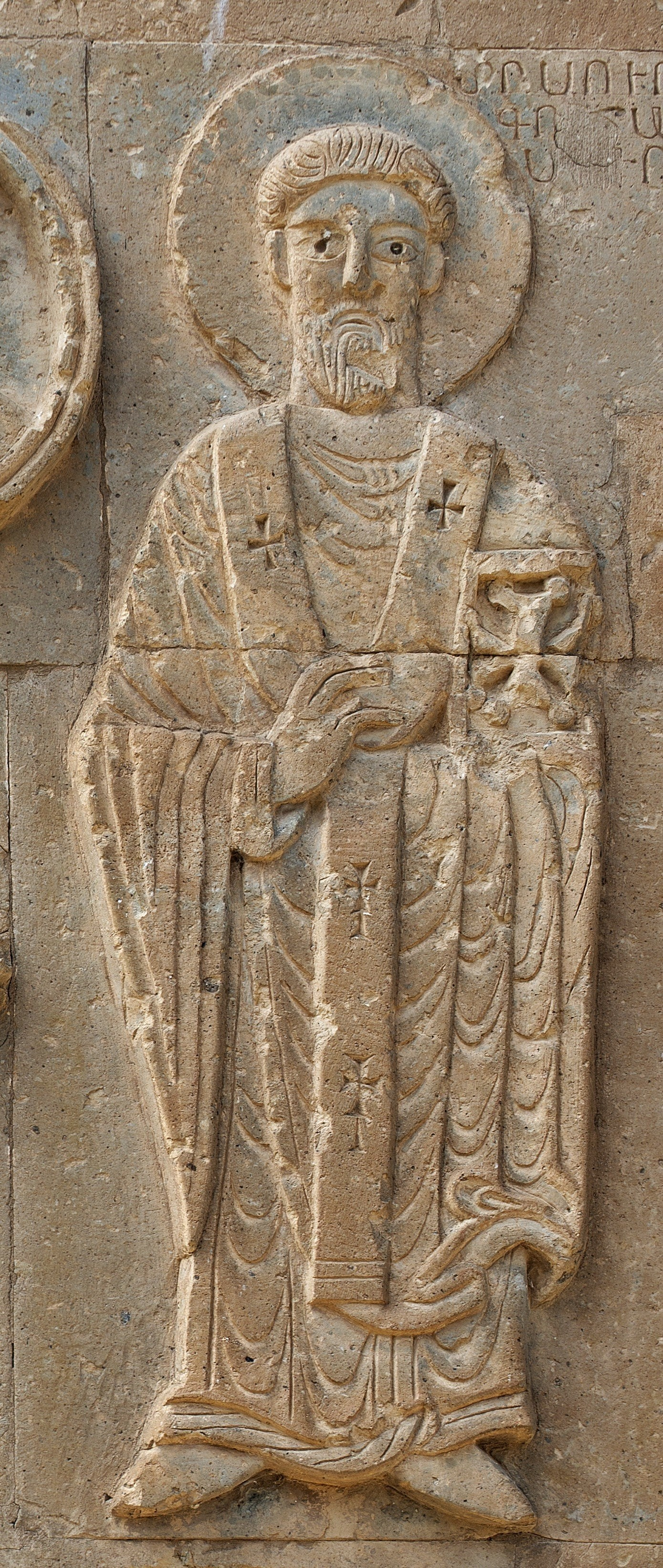
- A 10th century bas relief of St. Gregory at the Cathedral of the Holy Cross of Aghtamar (Akdamar), Lake Van (today Turkey)

Catholicos of All Armenians (Patriarch of Armenia)
- Born: 3rd century Kingdom of Armenia
- Died: c. 331; Daranali, Kingdom of Armenia (present-day Kemah, Erzincan, Turkey)
- Venerated in: Armenian Apostolic Church; Oriental Orthodox Churches; Catholic Church; Eastern Orthodox Church; Anglican Communion
- Feast: February 20 (Nardò, Italy); March 23 (Anglican Church); Saturday before fourth Sunday after Pentecost (Armenian Apostolic Church – discovery of relics); Last Saturday of Lent (Armenian Apostolic Church – descent into dungeon); Saturday before second Sunday after Pentecost (Armenian Apostolic Church – deliverance from dungeon); September 29 (Coptic Orthodox Church – Deliverance from Dungeon); September 30 (Eastern Orthodoxy, Syriac Orthodox Church, Catholic Church); October 1 (Catholic Church- 1962 Roman Missal); December 24 (Coptic Orthodox Church – Departure)
- Patronage: Armenia; Nardò, Italy

Gregory the Illuminator (Note: Armenian: Grigor Lusavorich, classical spelling: Գրիգոր Լուսաւորիչ, reformed spelling: Գրիգոր Լուսավորիչ, Western Armenian pronunciation: Krikor Lusavorich.) (Note: He is less commonly known as Gregory the Enlightener. Outside Armenia, he is often known as Gregory of Armenia or Gregory the Armenian. In Armenian, he is sometimes referred to as Gregory the Parthian (Գրիգոր Պարթեւ, Grigor Part’ev).) (c. 257 – c. 331) was the founder and first official head of the Armenian Apostolic Church. (Note: The Armenian Apostolic Church, as its name suggests, traces its founding to the apostles Thaddeus and Bartholomew, who are said to have preached Christianity in Armenia in the first century.) He converted Armenia from Zoroastrianism to Christianity in the early fourth century (traditionally dated to 301), making Armenia the first state to adopt Christianity as its official religion. He is venerated as a saint in the Armenian Apostolic Church and in some other churches.

Gregory is said to have been the son of a Parthian nobleman, Anak, who assassinated Khosrov, the Arsacid king of Armenia. The young Gregory was saved from the extermination of Anak's family and was raised as a Christian in Caesarea of Cappadocia, then part of the Roman Empire. Gregory returned to Armenia as an adult and entered the service of King Tiridates III, who had Gregory tortured after he refused to make a sacrifice to a pagan goddess. After discovering Gregory's true identity, Tiridates had him thrown into a deep pit well called Khor Virap for 14 years. Gregory was miraculously saved from death and released after many years with the help of Tiridates' sister Khosrovidukht. Gregory then converted the King to Christianity, and Armenia then, in 301 AD, became the first country to adopt Christianity as a state religion. Gregory the Illuminator then healed King Tiridates, whom the hagiographical sources say had been driven mad by his sins, and preached Christianity in Armenia. He was consecrated bishop of Armenia at Caesarea, baptized King Tiridates and the Armenian people, and traveled throughout Armenia, destroying pagan temples and building churches in their place.

Gregory eventually gave up the patriarchate to live as a hermit and was succeeded by his son Aristaces. Gregory's descendants, called the Gregorids, hereditarily held the office of Patriarch of Armenia with some interruptions until the fifth century. It is in Gregory's honor that the Armenian Church is sometimes called lusavorchakan ("of the Illuminator") or Gregorian.

== Early life ==
In the Armenian tradition, the standard version of the life of Gregory the Illuminator derives from the fifth-century hagiographic history attributed to Agathangelos. According to Agathangelos's account, Gregory was the son of the Parthian nobleman Anak; the later Armenian historian Movses Khorenatsi identifies Anak as a member of the Parthian noble house of Suren. At the incitation of the Sasanian king Ardashir I, who promised to return Anak his domain as a reward, the Parthian nobleman went to Armenia and assassinated the Arsacid king of Armenia Khosrov after gaining his confidence. (Note: There is no conclusive chronology of the reigns of Armenian kings of the third century, so it is not clear with which third-century Armenian king or kings this story should be associated.) Anak was then put to death by the Armenian nobles along with his entire family․ Anak's son Gregory narrowly escaped execution with the help of his nurse, whom Khorenatsi calls Sophy, sister of a Cappadocian notable named Euthalius (Ewtʻał). Gregory was taken to Caesarea in Cappadocia, where he received a Christian upbringing.

Josef Markwart distrusted the traditional account, suggesting instead that Gregory grew up near the Roman-Armenian border, perhaps in Neocaesarea or in Lesser Armenia and spoke both Armenian and Greek. According to historian Nicholas Adontz, it is likely that there were originally two independent traditions about the origins of Gregory the Illuminator, both giving the founder of the Armenian church a noble origin; these traditions were combined in the main Armenian version of Agathangelos. The story of Anak serves to connect Gregory to the Arsacid dynasty as a descendant of the Parthian clan of Suren, and also makes Gregory's early life reflect that of Tiridates III in epic fashion. Marie Louise Chaumont suggested that he was "probably a Greek from Cappadocia." Jean-Michel Thierry described him as of "Cappadocian culture and religion" and credited him with having introduced "Greek civilization to Armenia." According to Khorenatsi, upon coming of age, Gregory married Mariam, daughter of a Christian named David. He had two children with Mariam: Aristaces and Vrtanes, who would later succeed Gregory as patriarchs of Armenia.

== Christianization of Armenia ==
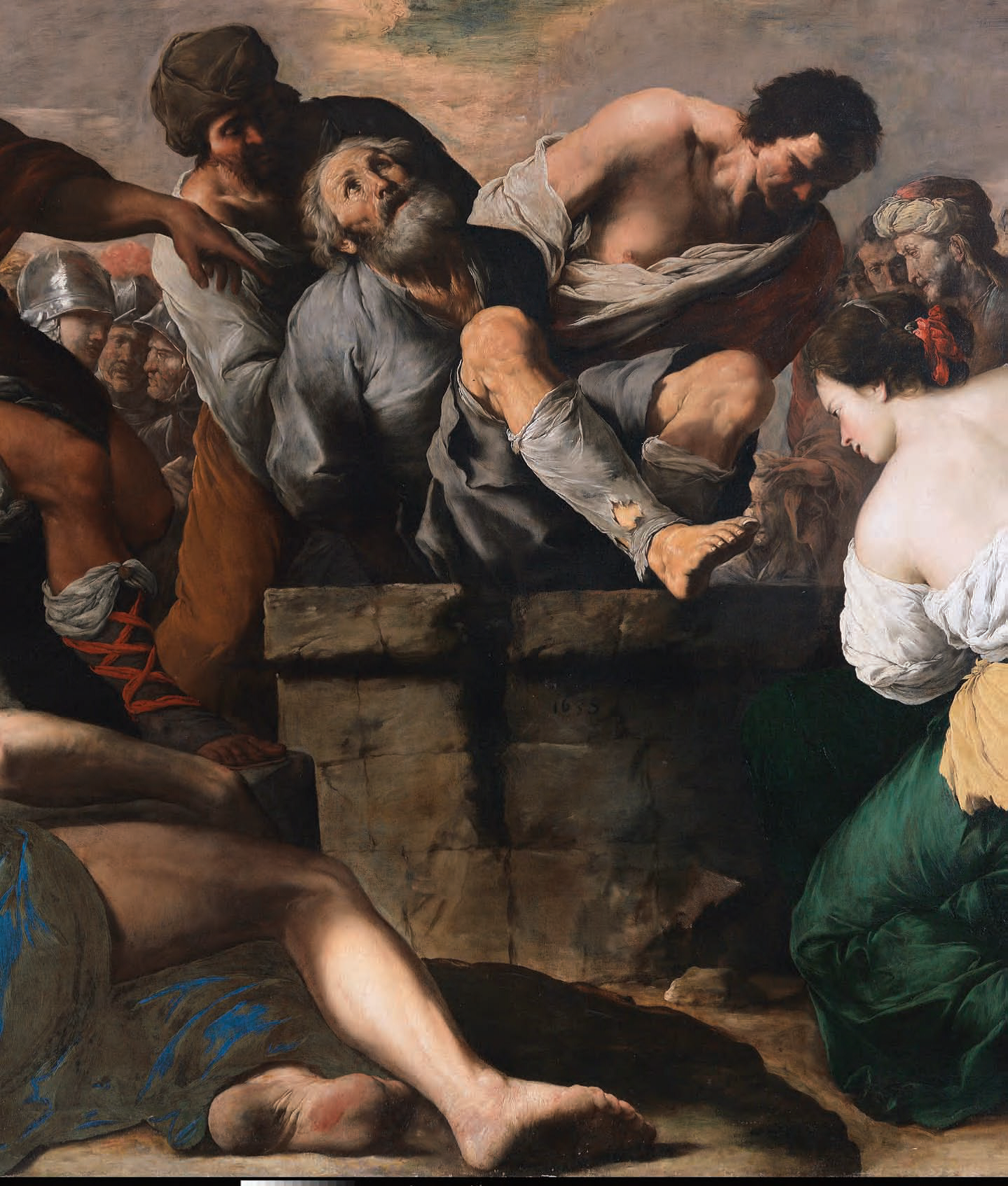
St. Gregory of Armenia is cast into the pit by Francesco Fracanzano

After the birth of their sons, Mariam and Gregory separated, and Gregory went to Armenia to enter the service of King Tiridates III, son of the assassinated king Khosrov II. (Note: One Greek version of Agathangelos tells a significantly different story of Gregory's wife, who is called Julitta. In this version, Gregory's wife and sons are implied to have followed him to Armenia, but fled back to Caesarea after Gregory's imprisonment. After Gregory was released from imprisonment, his wife went to Armenia to join him, leaving behind their sons in Caesarea, but Gregory refused to return to married life, instead asking the king to put his wife in charge of the holy virgins and temporarily lead the Christians in worship.) After Gregory refused to sacrifice to the goddess Anahit, the king had Gregory imprisoned and subjected to many tortures. Once Tiridates discovered that Gregory was the son of his father's killer, he had Gregory thrown into a deep pit called Khor Virap near Artaxata, where he remained for thirteen (or fifteen) years. In Agathangelos's history, Gregory is miraculously saved and brought out from the pit after Tiridates' sister Khosrovidukht sees a vision. Gregory then healed the king, who, Agathangelos writes, had been driven into animal madness for his sinful behavior. Tiridates and his court accepted Christianity, making Armenia the first state to adopt Christianity as its official religion. (Note: Interpretations that favor an earlier date for Tiridates' conversion argue that the Armenian king had grown disillusioned with his alliance with Rome and stopped following Diocletian's anti-Christian policy, instead adopting Christianity to strengthen the state and further separate Armenia from Rome and Persia. Those who favor the later date of 314 argue that Tiridates, as a loyal client-king of Rome, could not have set up Christianity as Armenia's state religion in contradiction to Rome's anti-Christian policy at the time, and place the conversion after the Edict of Milan in 313.)

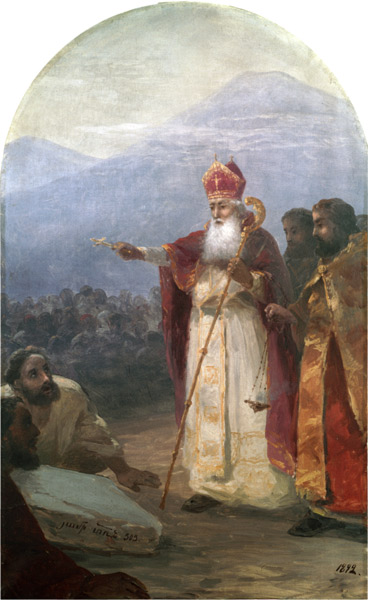
The Baptism of the Armenian People (1892), by Ivan Aivazovsky

After being released, Gregory preached the Christian faith in Armenia and erected shrines to the martyrs Gayane and Hripsime in Vagharshapat on a spot indicated to him in a vision. (Note: Scholar Robert W. Thomson notes that, although Vagharshapat-Ejmiatsin had "clearly been a holy shrine" from early on in Christian Armenian history, the association of Gregory with Vagharshapat dates from after the partition of Armenia in 387, when the mother see of the Armenian Church moved to Eastern Armenia. The actual original center of the Armenian Church was at Ashtishat.) Vagharshapat would later become home to the mother church of Armenian Christianity and, by medieval times, called Ejmiatsin ("descent of the only-begotten") in reference to Gregory's vision. (Note: The figure who appears to Gregory was later identified with Christ in the Armenian tradition, although this is not explicitly stated in Agathangelos.) Gregory, sometimes accompanied by Tiridates, went around Armenia destroying pagan temples, defeating the armed resistance of the pagan priests. Gregory then went to Caesarea with a retinue of Armenian princes and was consecrated bishop of Armenia by Leontius of Caesarea. Until the death of Nerses I in the late fourth century, Gregory's successors would go to Caesarea to be confirmed as bishops of Armenia, and Armenia remained under the titular authority of the metropolitans of Caesarea.

Returning to Armenia, Gregory raised churches in place of the destroyed pagan temples and seized their estates and wealth for the Armenian Church and his house. (Note: According to the fifth-century history attributed to Faustus of Byzantium, by the time of Gregory's descendant Patriarch Nerses I, the domains of the Gregorid house amounted to fifteen districts (gawaṛs).) On the site of the destroyed temple to Vahagn at Ashtishat, Gregory raised a church which became the original center of the Armenian Church and remained so until after the partition of the country in 387. Gregory met King Tiridates near the town of Bagavan and baptized the Armenian king, army and people in the Euphrates. In two non-Armenian versions of Agathangelos's history, Gregory also baptizes together with Tiridates the kings of Caucasian Albania, Georgia and Lazica/Abkhazia. He founded schools for the Christian education of children, where the languages of instruction were Greek and Syriac. He established the ecclesiastical structure of Armenia, appointing as bishops some of the children of pagan priests. Gregory is also said to have journeyed to Rome with King Tiridates in an embassy to the recently converted Constantine the Great, but scholar Robert W. Thomson views this as fictional.

The conversion of Armenia to Christianity is traditionally dated to 301, but modern scholarship considers a later date, approximately 314, to be more likely. Additionally, the history of Agathangelos depicts the spread of Christianity of Armenia as having occurred practically entirely within Gregory's lifetime, when, in fact, it was a more gradual process.

== Retirement and death ==
Some time after converting Armenia to Christianity, Gregory appointed his younger son Aristaces as his successor and went to live an ascetic life in the "cave of Manē" in the district of Daranali in Upper Armenia. (Note: Agathangelos writes that King Tiridates sent for Aristaces and Vrtanes and had them brought to Armenia from Caesarea after Gregory went to live in seclusion.) The Patriarchate of Armenia would be held as a hereditary office, with some interruptions, by the house of Gregory, called the Gregorids, until the death of Patriarch Isaac in the fifth century. According to Movses Khorenatsi, Gregory sometimes came out from his hermitage and traveled around the country until Aristaces returned from the Council of Nicaea (325), after which Gregory never appeared to anyone again. He died in seclusion in the cave of Manē and was buried nearby by shepherds who did not know who he was. All of the sources indicate that Gregory's death occurred not long after the Council of Nicaea; Cyril Toumanoff gives 328 as the year of Gregory's death.

== Historical assessment ==
Levon Ter-Petrosyan, philologist and Armenia's first president, postulates that Gregory and Mesrop Mashtots had the most influence on the course of Armenian history. James R. Russell argues that both Gregory and Mashtots were visionaries, found a champion for their program in the king, looked to the West, had very strong pro-Hellenic bias, trained the children of pagan priests and assembled their own disciples to spread the faith through learning.

== Relics and veneration ==
After his death his corpse was removed to the village of Thodanum (T'ordan, modern Doğanköy, Kemah, near Erzincan).

The Mother See of Holy Etchmiadzin, the Armenian Catholicosate of the Great House of Cilicia, the Armenian Patriarchate of Jerusalem and the Armenian Patriarchate of Constantinople each claim to have relics from the right arm of the saint, in an arm-shaped reliquary. The catholicosates of Etchmiadzin and Cilicia use the arm relic for the blessing of the Holy Myron every seven years.

In the calendar of the Armenian Church, the discovery of the relics of St. Gregory is an important feast and is commemorated on the Saturday before the Fourth Sunday after Pentecost. Two other feast days in the Armenian Apostolic Church are devoted to St. Gregory: the feast of his entry into Khor Virap, the 'deep pit or dungeon' (commemorated on the last Saturday of Lent) and his deliverance from Khor Virap (commemorated on the Saturday before the second Sunday after Pentecost).

=== Depictions in Armenian art ===
Gregory has been depicted widely in Armenian art since the early Middle Ages on various media. He is most likely the figure, a saint, carved on a seventh-century stele in Talin. He is depicted next to John the Baptist, the prophet Elijah, and most likely Thaddeus, James of Nisibis, and the apostle Bartholomew on the east façade of the tenth-century Aghtamar Cathedral in Lake Van. Sixteen scenes depicting Gregory's life are painted in the Church of Tigran Honents in Ani (1215), that contains the most complete painted interior of all medieval Armenian monuments.

Gregory is depicted on the silver reliquary of Skevra (1293), the best known work of precious metal from Armenian Cilicia, along with Saint Thaddeus, and on the reliquary of the Holy Sign (1300), another significant piece of Armenian metalwork made at the Monastery of Khotakerats, along with John the Baptist. Gregory is depicted with King Trdat on the left and Hripsime on a 1448 processional banner of embroidered silk kept at the Treasury of Etchmiadzin. At the Vank Cathedral in New Julfa, the Armenian district of Isfahan, Iran, Gregory's martyrdom was painted in a European style by the Italian-trained Hovhannes M'rkuz Jułayeci in 1646.

Armenian depictions of Gregory

A miniature of Gregory and Trdat (as a boar) by Vardan Baghishetsi on a manuscript from Baghesh, Vaspurakan, c. 1569–70

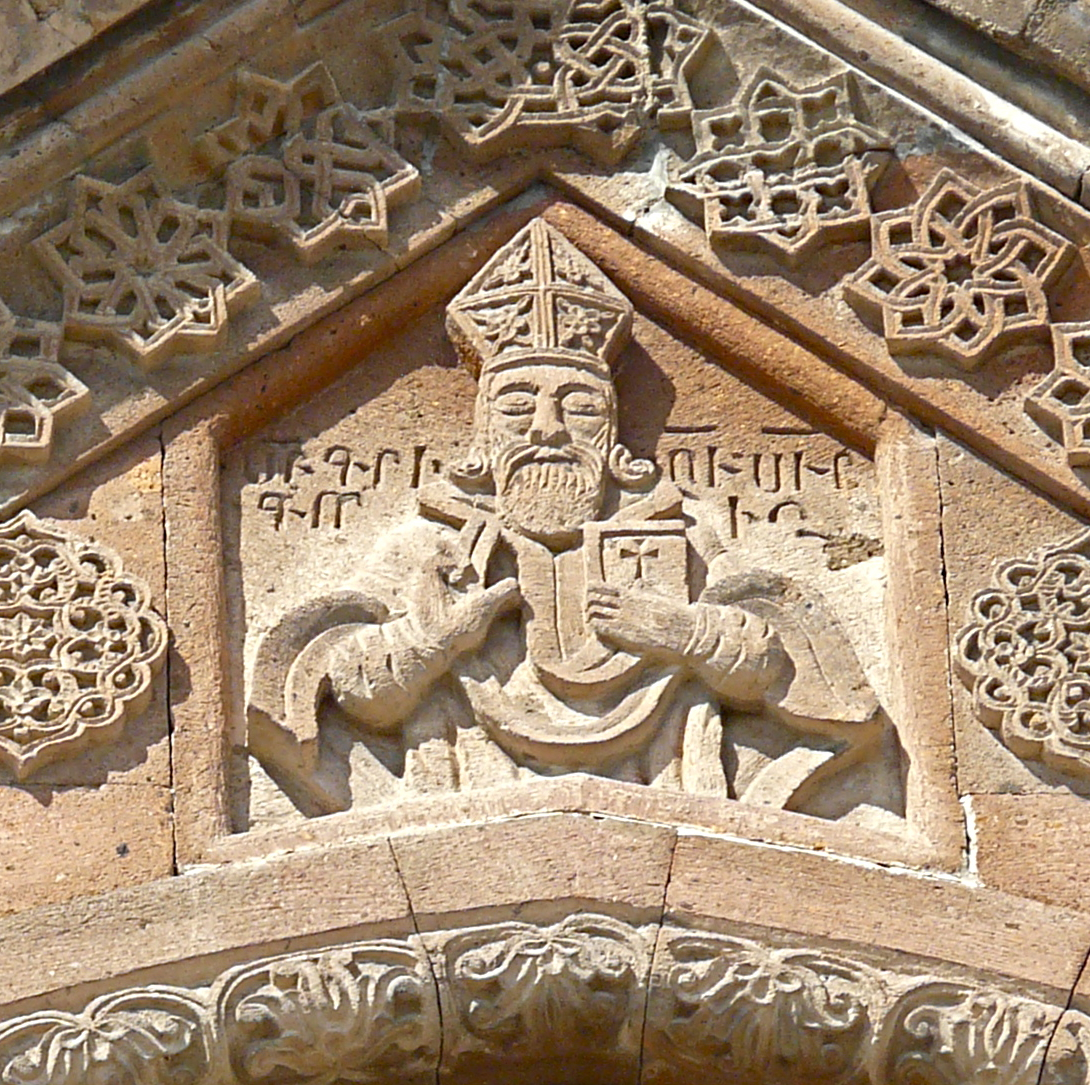
Etchmiadzin Cathedral, 17th century

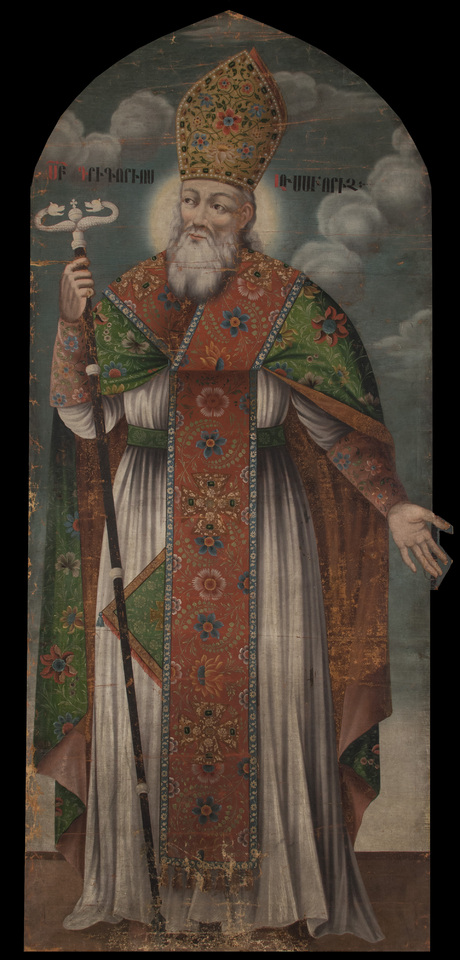
An 18th-century painting by an unknown author

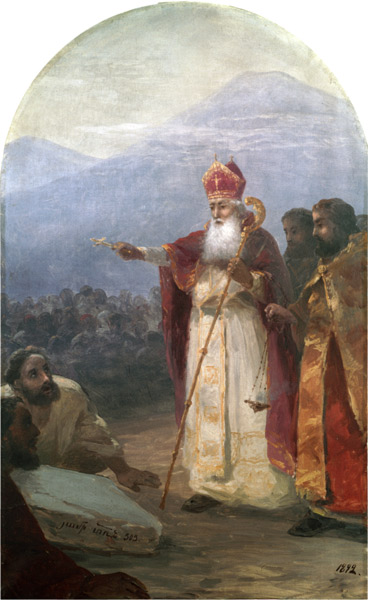
The Baptism of the Armenian People. Gregory the Illuminator by Ivan Aivazovsky (1892)

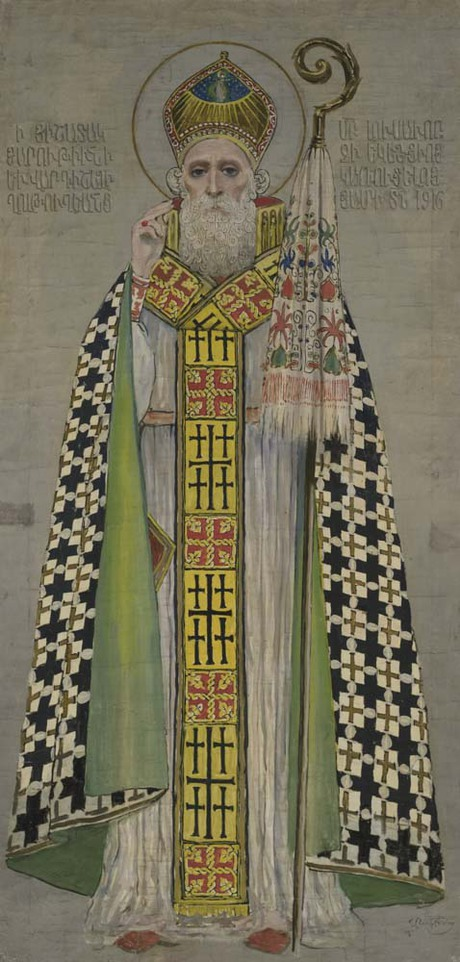
A painting by Vardges Sureniants

=== Byzantium and the Eastern Orthodox world ===
Gregory is commemorated on September 30 by the Eastern Orthodox Church, which styles him "Holy Hieromartyr Gregory, Bishop of Greater Armenia, Equal of the Apostles and Enlightener of Armenia."

His relics were scattered near and far in the reign of the Eastern Roman Emperor Zeno. Relic fragments are found at the Karakallou Monastery and Iviron Monastery on Mount Athos; the Gregoriou Monastery claims to have the saint's skull.

Veneration of Gregory began in the Byzantine Empire in the late 9th century with the ascend of Basil I. A 9th century mosaic of Gregory was uncovered in Hagia Sophia under a layer of plaster in 1847–49 during the restoration by the Fossati brothers. Located in the south tympanum, next to the Fathers of the Church, it shows Gregory standing in bishop robes, blessing with one hand and holding the Book of the Gospels with the other. The mosaic, thought to have been destroyed in the 1894 earthquake, survives in drawing by Wilhelm Salzenberg and the Fossati brothers. Sirarpie Der Nersessian argued that his inclusion in the series of the Church Fathers is explained by the myth of the Arsacid origin of Basil I, likely fabricated by Patriarch Photios I of Constantinople.

Gregory is depicted in two prominent Byzantine illuminated manuscripts—the Menologion of Basil II (c. 1000) and the Theodore Psalter (1066)—and in a number of Byzantine churches and monasteries, most notably Hosios Loukas (11th century), Church of Panagia Chalkeon in Thessaloniki (11th century), and the Pammakaristos Church in Constantinople (14th century).

One of the sections of Moscow's iconic Saint Basil's Cathedral is named after Gregory the Armenian (Tserkov Grigoriya Armyanskogo). It is dedicated to the capture of Ars Tower of the Kazan Kremlin by Ivan the Terrible during the Siege of Kazan on September 30, 1552, on his feast day.

Byzantine depictions of Gregory

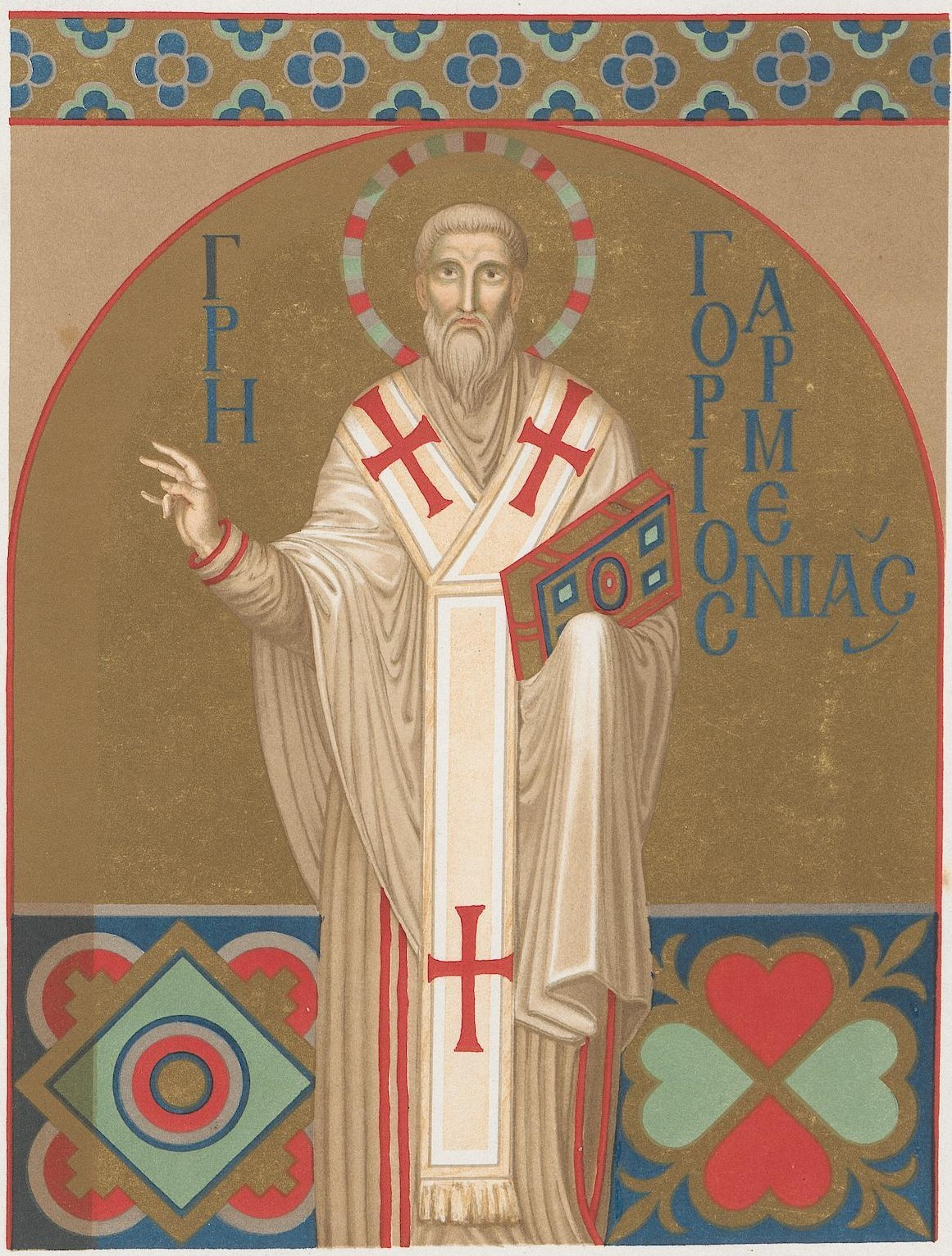
Lost mosaic from Hagia Sophia (9th century) (Note: As reproduced by Wilhelm Salzenberg.)

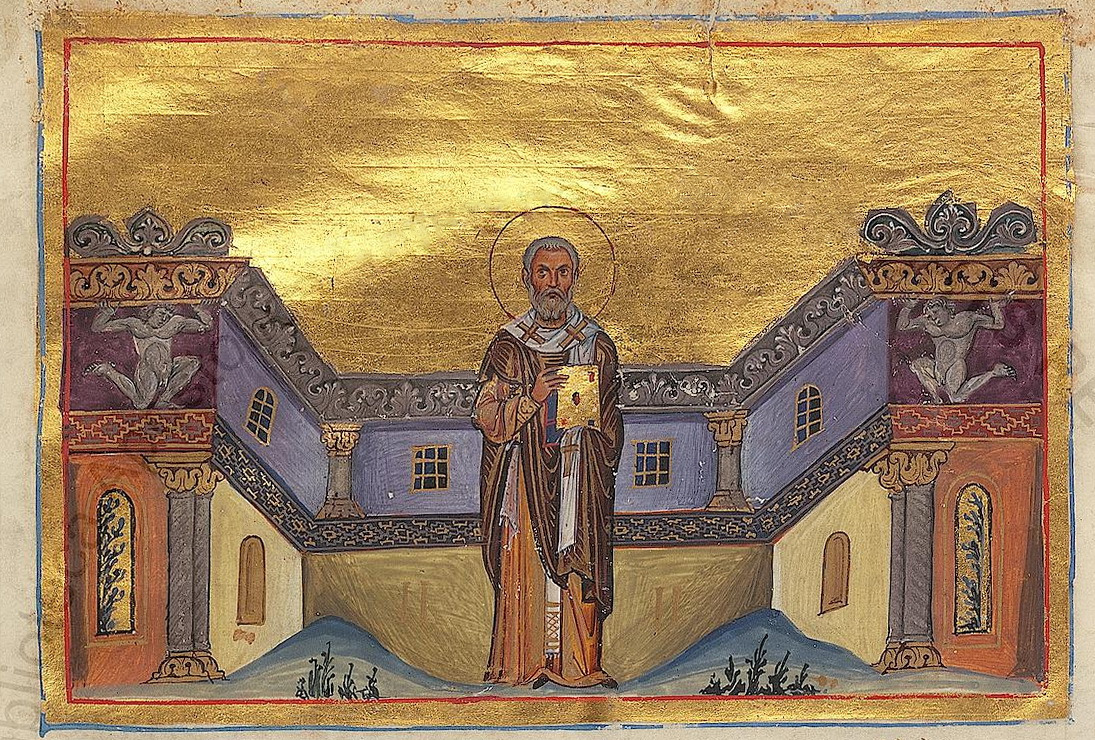
in the Menologion of Basil II (c. 1000)

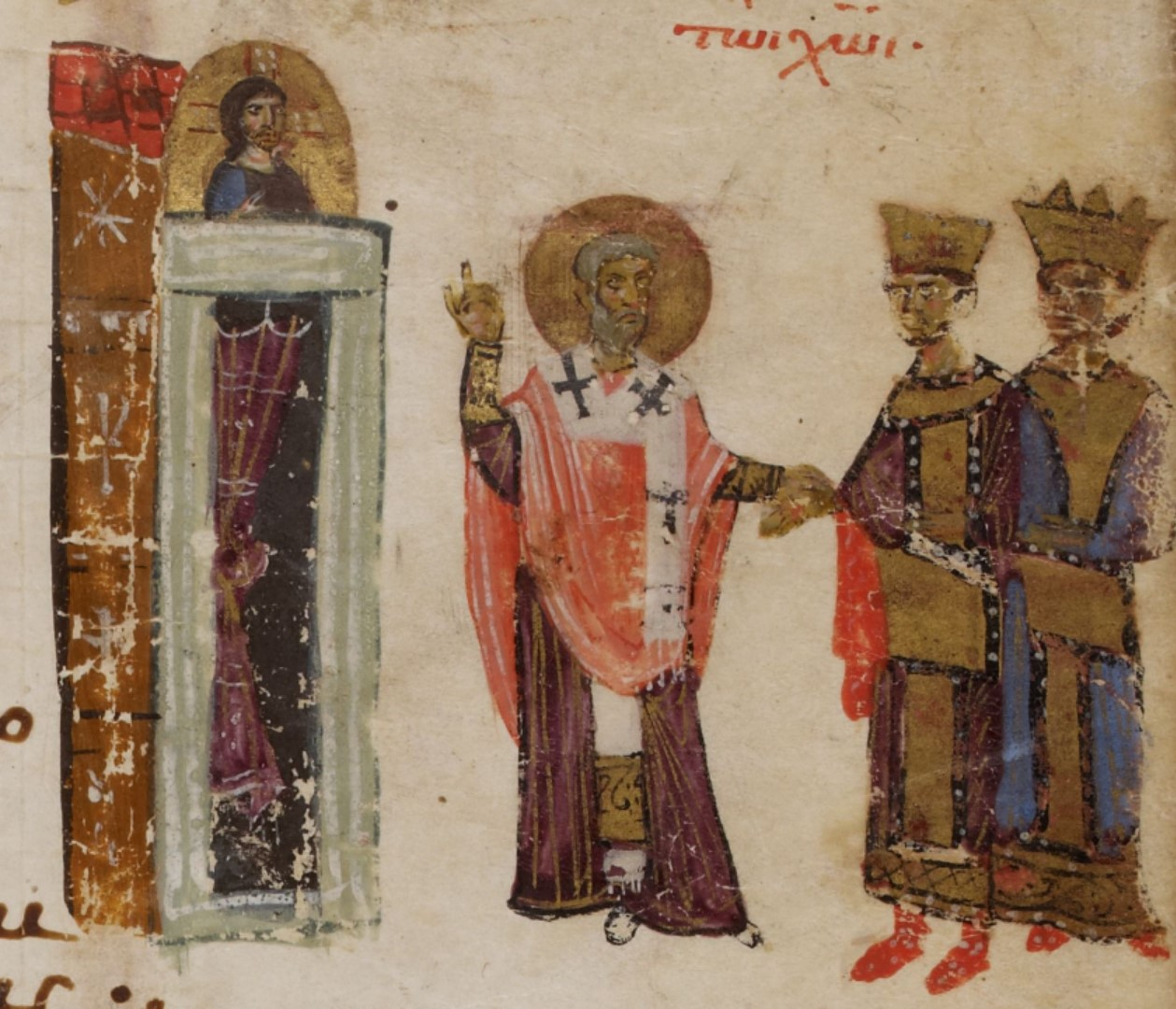
in the Theodore Psalter (1066) (Note: "St. Gregory brings Tiridates to Christ. (Gregory has purple tunic, pink cloak, and white stole w. black crosses).")

=== Italy and the Roman Catholic world ===
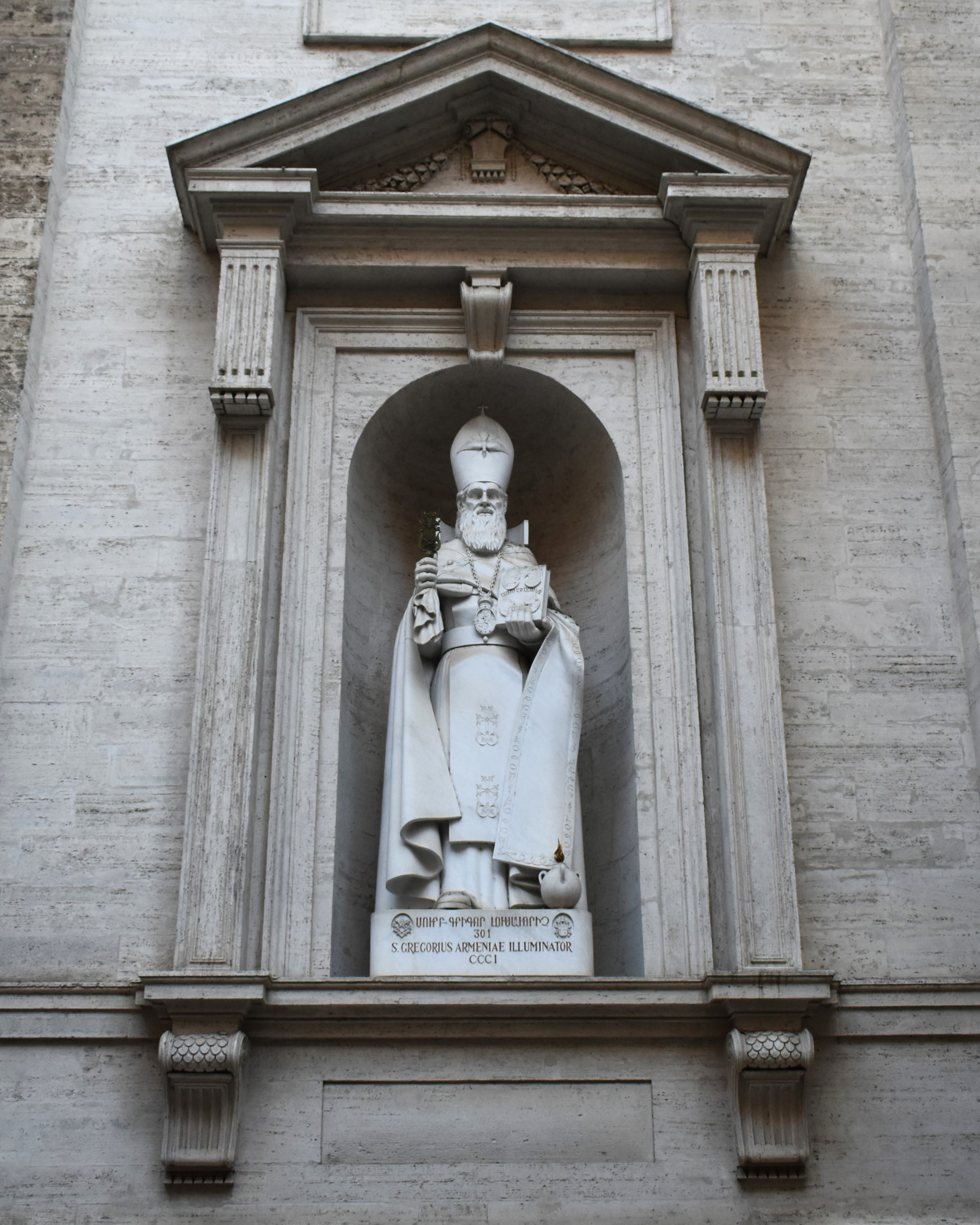
A statue of St. Gregory in Vatican's St. Peter's Basilica inaugurated in 2005.

In the 8th century, the iconoclast decrees in Greece caused a number of religious orders to flee the Byzantine Empire and seek refuge elsewhere. San Gregorio Armeno in Naples was built in that century over the remains of a Roman temple dedicated to Ceres, by a group of nuns escaping from the Byzantine Empire with the relics of Gregory, including his skull, arms, a femur bone, his staff, the leather straps used in his torture and the manacles that held the saint. The femur and manacles were returned by Pope John Paul II to Catholicos Karekin II and are now enshrined at Saint Gregory the Illuminator Cathedral in Yerevan.

On February 20, 1743, Nardò, Italy was hit by a devastating earthquake that destroyed almost the entire city. The only structure to survive intact after the quake was the city's statue of St. Gregory the Illuminator. According to the city's registers, only 350 out of the city's 10,000 inhabitants died in the earthquake, leading the inhabitants to believe that St. Gregory saved the city. Every year, they mark the anniversary of the earthquake by holding three days of celebrations in his honor. Two relics of the saint are at Nardò Cathedral: one is kept in a silver bust of the saint, which is carried in processions, and the other, the metacarpus, is kept within a silver arm-shaped reliquary.

The feast day of Saint Gregory the Illuminator is on September 30 according to both the 2004 Roman Martyrology of the Ordinary Form and the 1956 Roman Martyrology of the Extraordinary Form of the Catholic Church; however, the 1962 Roman Missal and its previous editions list the feast day of "Saint Gregory, Bishop of Greater Armenia and Martyr" on October 1.

A 5.7 m (19 ft) tall statue of Gregory in the Carrara marble was installed in the north courtyard of St. Peter's Basilica in Vatican City in January 2005. Sculpted by France-based Lebanese-Armenian sculptor Khatchik Kazandjian, the statue was inaugurated by Pope John Paul II. Gregory is depicted holding a cross in one hand and the Bible in the other. Pope Benedict XVI inaugurated the area as St. Gregory the Illuminator Courtyard in February 2008.

Church of San Gregorio Armeno is a church and a monastery in Naples, Italy named after the Gregory the Illuminator

=== Anglican Communion ===
He is honored with a feast day on the liturgical calendar of the Episcopal Church (USA) and in the Anglican Church of Canada on March 23.

=== Oriental Orthodox Church ===
Historically, Gregory the Illuminator has been commemorated in the Coptic Orthodox Church with various feast days (Thout 19, Thout 30, Babah 3, and Kiahk 15) from as early as the seventh century. In current liturgical practice, his feast days are Thout 19 (September 29), commemorating his ascent from the pit, and Kiahk 15 (December 24), commemorating his departure. Similarly, the Ethiopian Orthodox Church commemorates him on September 29 and December 24.

== Gallery ==
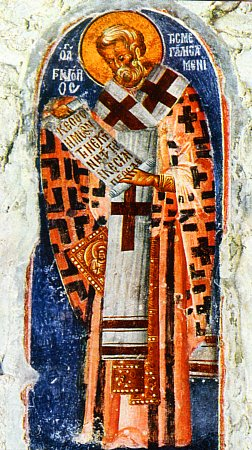
14th-century Byzantine icon of St. Gregory

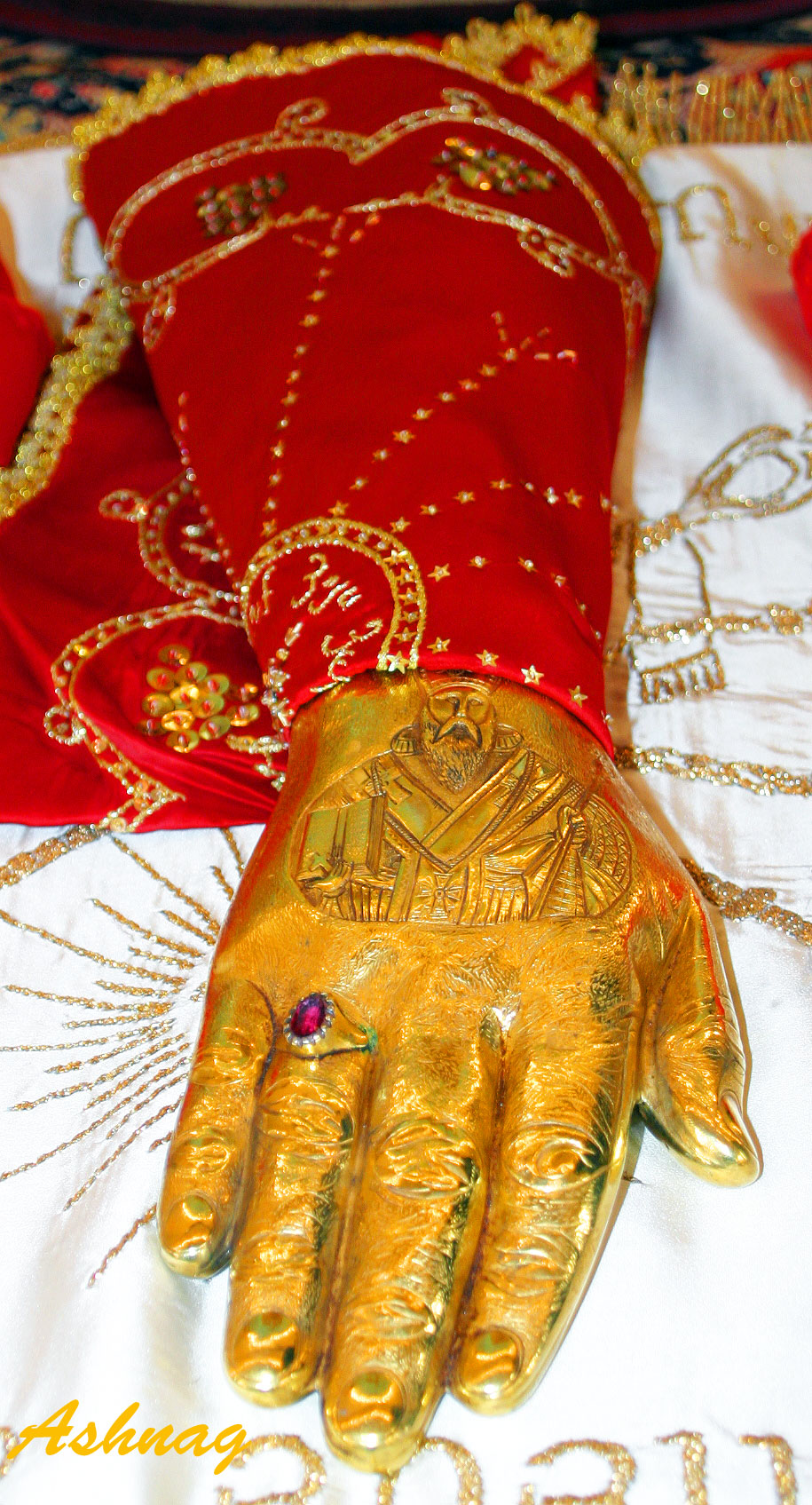
The Right Arm of Gregory in the museum of the Holy See of Cilicia in Antelias, Lebanon

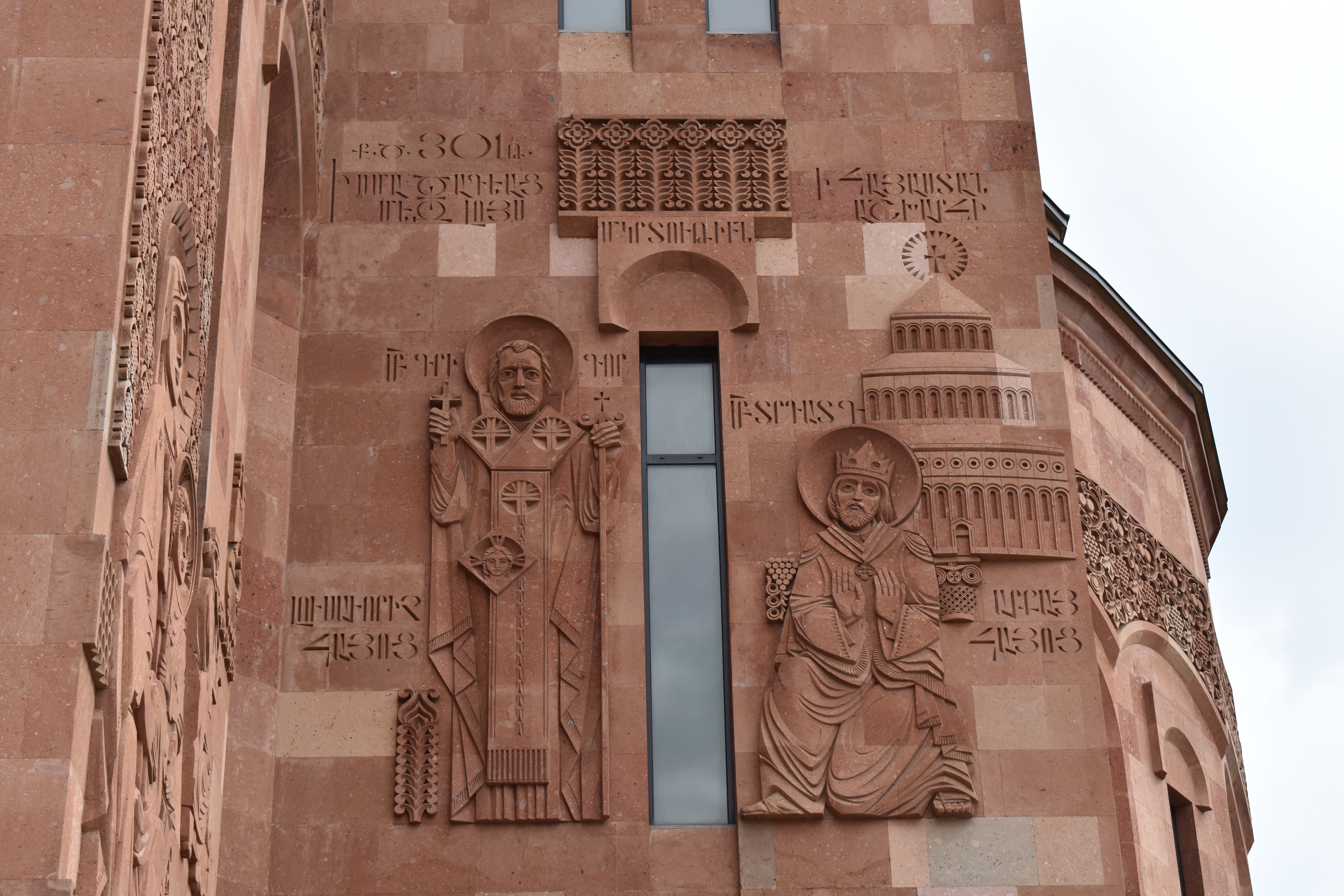
A relief depicting Gregory the Illuminator and Tiridates III in Armenian Cathedral of Moscow

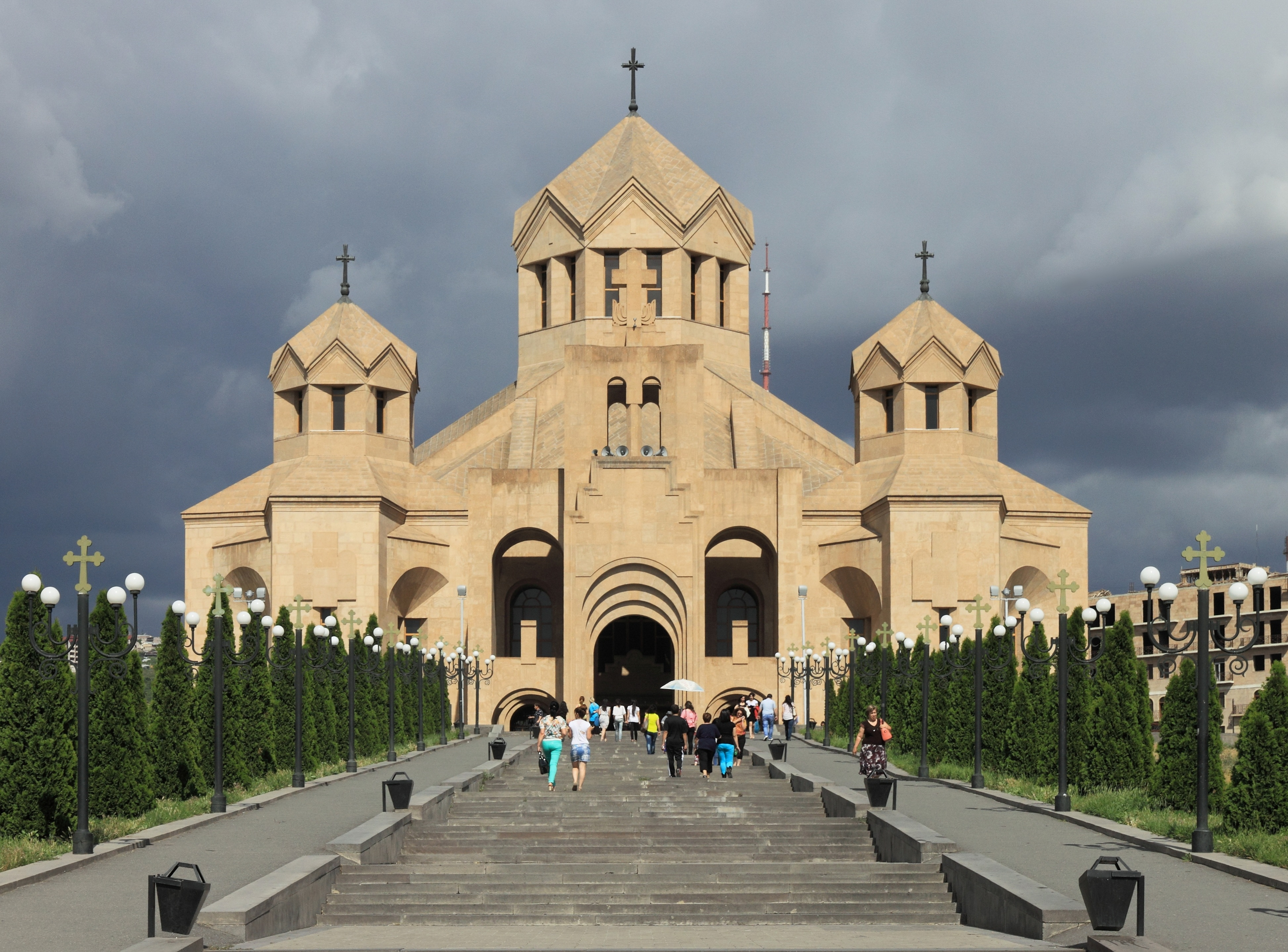
Saint Gregory the Illuminator Cathedral, Yerevan, completed in 2001, contains the remains of Gregory

== See also ==
- Eastern Christianity
- Gregorids
- Gregory of Narek, similarly named saint venerated by Armenian Christians
- Vardapet, Armenian preaching monks

== Sources ==
- Conybeare, Frederick Cornwallis (1911). "Gregory the Illuminator" . Encyclopædia Britannica. Vol. 12 (11th ed.). pp. 565–566.
- Garsoïan, Nina (1997). "The Aršakuni Dynasty". In Hovannisian, Richard G. (ed.). The Armenian People from Ancient to Modern Times. Vol. 1. New York: St. Martin's Press. ISBN 0-312-10169-4.
- Garsoïan, Nina G. (1989). The Epic Histories Attributed to Pʻawstos Buzand (Buzandaran Patmutʻiwnkʻ). Cambridge, Massachusetts: Harvard University Press. ISBN 0-674-25865-7.
- Adonts, Nikoghayos (2006). "Grigor Lusavorichʻ ev Anak Partʻev" Գրիգոր Լուսավորիչ և Անակ Պարթև [Gregory the Illuminator and Anak the Parthian]. Erker Երկեր [Works] (PDF) (in Armenian). Vol. I. Erevani hamalsarani hratarakchʻutʻyun. pp. 169–179. ISBN 5-8084-0704-4. (French version: Adontz, N. (1928). "Gregoire l'Illuminateur et Anak le Parthe". Revue des études arméniennes. 9: 233–245.)
- Agathangelos (2020). History of St. Gregory and the Conversion of Armenia.
- "Grigor I Lusavorichʻ". Haykakan sovetakan hanragitaran (in Armenian). Vol. 3. Yerevan. 1977. p. 212.
- Lang, David Marshall (1970). Armenia, Cradle of Civilization. London: Allen & Unwin. ISBN 0-04-956007-7.
- Russell, James R. (2004). Armenian and Iranian Studies. Department of Near Eastern Languages and Civilizations, Harvard University. p. 358. ISBN 978-0-935411-19-5.
- Terian, Abraham (2005). Patriotism and Piety in Armenian Christianity: The Early Panegyrics On Saint Gregory. St Vladimir's Seminary Press. ISBN 978-0-88141-293-2.
- Thomson, R. W. (1984). "Agathangelos". In Yarshater, Ehsan (ed.). Encyclopædia Iranica. Vol. I/6: Afghanistan–Ahriman. London and New York: Routledge & Kegan Paul. pp. 607–608. ISBN 978-0-71009-095-9.
- Thomson, Robert W. (1994). "Agathangelos". In Greppin, John A. C. (ed.). Studies in Classical Armenian Literature. Delmar, New York: Caravan Books. pp. 15–26.
- Thomson, Robert W. (1976). Agathangelos, History of the Armenians. Albany: SUNY. ISBN 0-87395-323-1.
- Thomson, Robert W. (1978). Moses Khorenatsʻi, History of the Armenians. Cambridge, Massachusetts: Harvard University Press. ISBN 0-674-39571-9.
- Toumanoff, Cyril (1969). "The Third-Century Armenian Arsacids: A Chronological and Genealogical Commentary". Revue des études arméniennes. 6: 233–281.
- Der Nersessian, Sirarpie (1966). "Les portraits de Grégoire l'Illuminateur dans l'art byzantin [Portraits of Gregory the Illuminator in Byzantine Art]". Byzantion (in French). 36 (2): 386–395. JSTOR 44169213.
- Mango, Cyril; Hawkins, Ernest J. W. (1972). "The Mosaics of St. Sophia at Istanbul. The Church Fathers in the North Tympanum". Dumbarton Oaks Papers. 26: 1–41. doi:10.2307/1291315. JSTOR 1291315.
- Ayvazyan, Gh. V. (1984). "Գրիգոր Լուսավորչի պաշտամունքը Բյուզանդական կայսրությունում [The Cult of Gregory the Illuminator in the Byzantine Empire]". Etchmiadzin (in Armenian). 41 (6): 40–47.
- Maranci, Christina (2018). The Art of Armenia: An Introduction. Oxford University Press. ISBN 978-0-19-026900-5.

Preceded by New creation	Catholicos of the Holy See of St. Echmiadzin and All Armenians; 288–325	Succeeded by St. Aristaces I
