= Robert W. Thomson =

Robert William Thomson
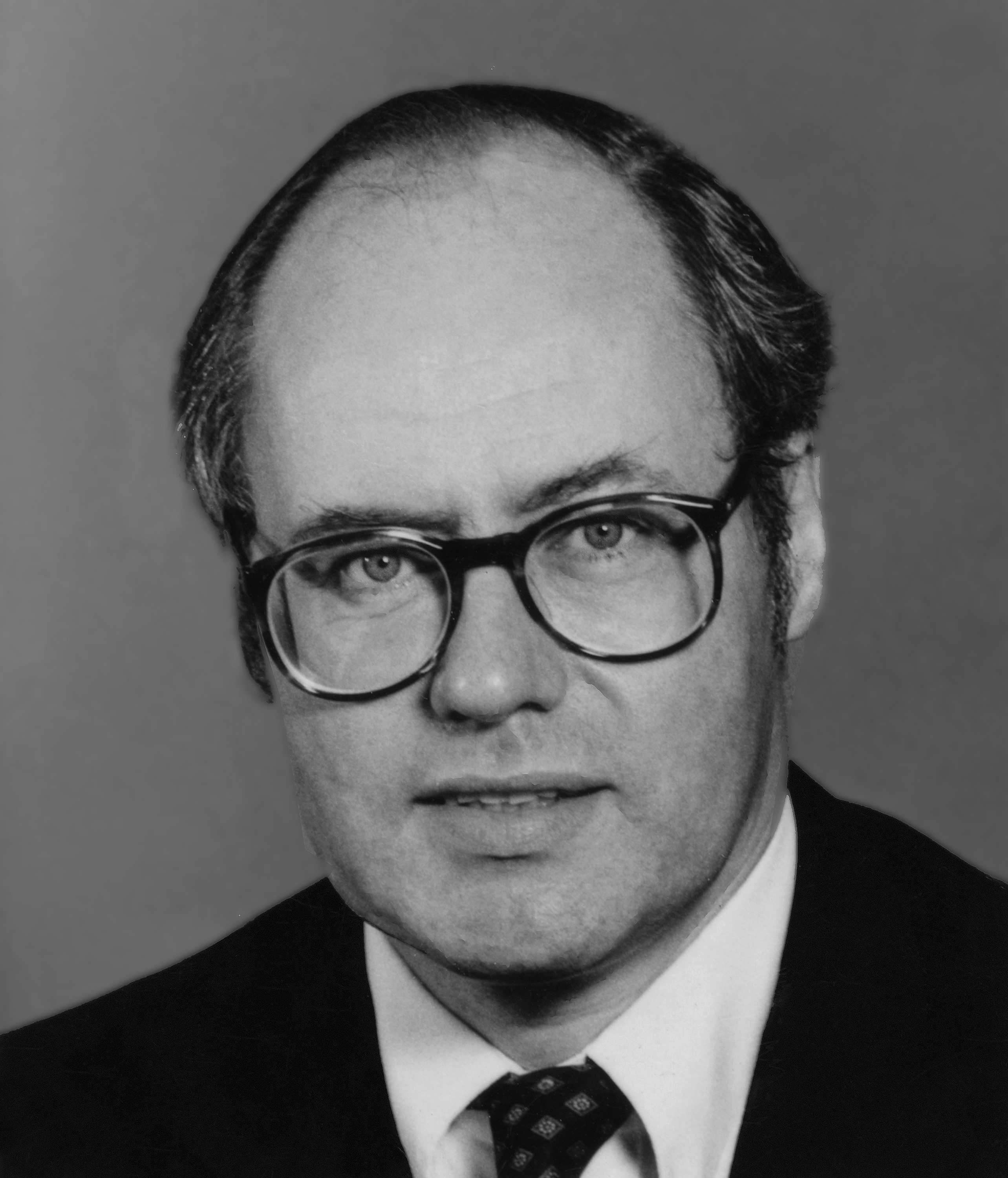
- Born: 24 March 1934; London, United Kingdom
- Died: November 20, 2018 (aged 84); Oxford, United Kingdom
- Occupations: professor, scholar of Armenian studies

Robert William Thomson (24 March 1934, Cheam, London UK – 20 November 2018, Oxford) was Calouste Gulbenkian Professor of Armenian Studies at the University of Oxford.

Thomson graduated from the University of Cambridge with a degree in classics, then studied at the Halki seminary in Turkey. Thomson received his PhD from Cambridge after defending his doctoral dissertation on Armenian and Syriac versions of Athanasius of Alexandria's works.

When an Armenian Studies Professorship was established in the Faculty of Arts and Sciences at the Harvard University in 1969, Thomson was appointed to the chair which was subsequently named in honor of Armenian saint and scholar Mesrob Mashtots. From 1984 to 1989 he was the Director of the Dumbarton Oaks Research Library and Collection.

Thomson held his position at Harvard until 1992, when he accepted the Gulbenkian Chair in Armenian Studies at Oxford University in England. He retired in 2001. In 1995, he was elected a fellow of the British Academy. Among other distinctions, he received the Saint Sahak and Saint Mesrop Medal from Vazgen I, Catholicos of All Armenians for his contributions to Armenian studies.

Thomson translated into English several Classical Armenian, Syriac and Greek texts as well as having written two textbooks on the Armenian language, one of which is the sole English-language textbook on Classical Armenian.

Thomson died in 2018.

== Books ==
=== Studies ===
- Studies in Armenian Literature and Christianity (Variorum, 1994)
- Rewriting Caucasian History: The Mediaeval Armenian Adaptation of the Georgian Chronicles. The Original Georgian Texts and The Armenian Adaptation (Oxford, Clarendon Press, 1996)

=== Language textbooks ===
- An Introduction to Classical Armenian (Caravan Books, 1975)
- A Textbook of Modern Western Armenian (with Kevork B. Bardakjian) (Caravan Books, 1977)

=== Translations ===
- The Historical Compilation of Vardan Arewelc'i, in: Dumbarton Oaks Papers 43 (1989), p. 125-226.
- The Armenian Adaptation of the Ecclesiastical History of Socrates Scholasticus [Hebrew University Armenian Texts and Studies, 3]. Translation of the Armenian with comparative study of the original and revised versions. Peeters Publishers, Leuven, 2001, Pp. xxii, 254.
- The Teaching of Saint Gregory (from Agathangelos's History of Armenia). New and revised edition of the 1970 Harvard University Press edition, New Rochelle, New York, 2001, Pp. viii, 267.
- Hamam, Commentary on the Book of Proverbs [Hebrew University Armenian Texts and Studies, 5]. Armenian text and English translation, with Introduction and extensive commentary, Peeters, Leuven 2005, Pp. vi, 307.
- Moses Khorenatsi, History of the Armenians. New and revised edition of the 1978 Harvard University Press edition, Caravan Books, Ann Arbor, 2006, Pp. xxi, 420.
- Nerses of Lambron, Commentary on the Book of Revelation [Hebrew University Armenian texts and Studies, 9]. English translation, with Introduction and commentary. Peeters Publishers, Leuven, 2007, Pp. xi, 225.
