= Upper Armenia =

Historical province of Greater Armenia

Բարձր Հայք
- Province of the ancient kingdom of Armenia
- 189 BC–11th century
- Capital: Ani-Kamakh
- Area
- 23,860 km^{2} (9,210 sq mi)
- History
  - Artaxias I declaring himself independent: 189 BC
  - Upper Armenia's conquest by the Byzantine Empire: 11th century

Upper Armenia (Armenian: Բարձր Հայք Bardzr Hayk‘) was the first province of the ancient kingdom of Armenia, located in present-day Turkey, roughly corresponding to the modern province of Erzincan, to the west of the Kura River. Within the borders of the kingdom, it was bounded by the regions of Sophene, Turuberan, Tayk, and Ayrarat. It was called Upper Armenia, as it was higher in elevation than the other provinces.

== Name ==
The province of High Armenia, which is listed as the first province in the "Ashkharatsuyts, is also known by the names City of Karin, Land of Karno, and Side of Karno.

High Armenia was one of the most ancient centers of the formation of the Armenian people and Armenian statehood. During the period of the Arsacid Kingdom, the mausoleums and burial places of Armenian kings, high priests, and after the adoption of Christianity, also the catholicoi, were located in High Armenia. This demonstrates the important role played by High Armenia and its powerful and vibrant cultural traditions, especially considering that the royal dynasty of Parthian origin seemingly had no traditions binding it to this region. From this perspective, it is by no means accidental that most of the famous pagan temples of the Kingdom of Greater Armenia were also located in High Armenia.

In the toponym "High Armenia," the word "High" does not simply mean "elevated," but rather "royal land" or perhaps "sacred land," which was translated from Persian into Armenian by the author of the Ashkharatsuyts and interpreted as "high".

== Natural resources ==
High Armenia is especially renowned for its cold springs and mineral waters. A considerable number of them are hot springs, particularly in the surroundings of Erzinka and Erzrum. Despite the severity of the climate, in certain regions of High Armenia (the Erzinka plateau, Derjan, Ashkala), it is possible to cultivate cotton, rice, orchards, and vineyards. There are reserves of coal, oil, iron, copper, gold, and several salt mines. From the perspective of natural wealth, the Erzrum region stands out in particular, where enormous reserves of oil, coal, and iron exist. Mineral springs emerge in many places throughout the country.

High Armenia was also rich in gold mines. Even after the Battle of Gaugamela, the next reference to Armenia was preserved by Strabo, according to whom, some time after the battle, one of the armies of Alexander the Great under the command of General Menon was sent to seize the gold-mining region of High Armenia, but the Armenians destroyed his army.

== History ==
In ancient times, High Armenia, together with part of Tayk and Lesser Armenia, constituted the territory of the Armenian tribal union Hayasa-Azzi. In subsequent centuries, when the Armenian people gradually formed and three state entities emerged in different parts of the Armenian Highlands (Greater Armenia, Lesser Armenia, and Tsopk), the greater western part of High Armenia became part of Lesser Armenia, while the smaller eastern part remained in the hands of separate Armenian tribal groups that still existed there.

After the first partition of Armenia (387 AD), High Armenia passed to the Roman Empire. The region formed a county subordinate to the Romano-Byzantine Empire. The supreme ruler there was the comes, appointed by the emperor and residing in the city of Theodosiopolis. The country was divided into nakharardoms — feudal principalities ruled by Armenian nakharars. The nakharars were autonomous in their internal affairs: they enjoyed all feudal privileges, possessed their own armies, and each was the absolute lord of his district, ruling it hereditarily. This administrative condition of Inner Armenia changed radically in the 6th century.

In the 7th century, the Arab Caliphate, which had emerged on the historical stage and rapidly became a vast empire, during its wars against the Byzantine Empire, conquered not only Eastern Armenia but also a large part of Western Armenia, including the eastern regions of First Armenia — the district of Karin and its surroundings. However, the district of Karin did not remain long under the Caliphate’s control; it was soon reattached to the Byzantine Empire and remained within it until the Seljuk invasions. In the 1070s, the Seljuks conquered and incorporated High Armenia into their empire.

In this region of historical Armenia, numerous masterpieces of miniature painting were created, some of which have survived. Among them are two magnificent Gospels from the end of the 11th century (Matenadaran manuscripts Nos. 2877 and 6264), the famous Mush Homiliary written in 1200–1202, which is the largest Armenian manuscript (70×55.5 cm), as well as the equally renowned Erzinka Bible of 1269 (Jerusalem manuscript No. 1925), the Karin (Erzrum) manuscripts of the 12th–13th centuries, and others.

There were several roads in High Armenia that had both strategic and commercial importance. Particularly significant were the following: a) Trebizond–Karin. In Karin, this road divided into two branches, one of which passed through Eastern Armenia toward Persia and farther east, while the other went through Manazkert and along the western shore of Lake Van toward Mesopotamia; b) Karin – Bagarich – Satagh – Sebastia and farther west. This road is described in the Peutinger Map. Besides its commercial importance, it was also a major military route.

== Districts ==
According to the Ashkharatsuyts of Anania Shirakatsi, High Armenia consisted of the following nine districts:

- Daranaghi
- Aryuts,
- Mndzur
- Ekeghyats
- Mananaghi
- Derjan
- Sper
- Shaghagomk
- Karin

In the Ashkharatsuyts, the districts of High Armenia are listed in the direction opposite to the flow of the Euphrates, sequentially from west to east. This circumstance facilitates the correct determination of the geographical location of the districts.

=== Daranagh ===
This district was located in the part of the Euphrates River where the river bends southward. In terms of territory, the district of Daranagh corresponded to the present-day region of Kamakh. Its name has ancient origins.

=== Sper ===
References to this district date back to very ancient times.Sper was renowned for its rich gold mines, which were known and exploited since antiquity. Sper extended across the upper basin of the Chorokh River. Until the 9th century, it belonged to the Armenian Bagratuni Dynasty.

=== Derjan ===
To the west it bordered the district of Ekeghyats, and to the east — Karin. Derjan occupied a fairly vast territory. It included the present-day plains of Ashkala and Derjan. The name Derjan, in the form "Terjan" (according to Western Armenian pronunciation), remains in use to this day.

=== Mananagh ===
The district of Mananagh was surrounded in the south by the eastern section of the Byurakn-Mndzur Mountain Range, and from the west, east, and north by the districts of Ekeghyats, Karin, and Derjan. It occupied part of the basin of the Derjan (Tughlu) River, a left tributary of the Euphrates. Overall, the region has predominantly flat terrain. It is known for its fertile lands. Several salt mines are located here. The name Mananagh also has ancient origins.

=== District of Ekeghyats ===
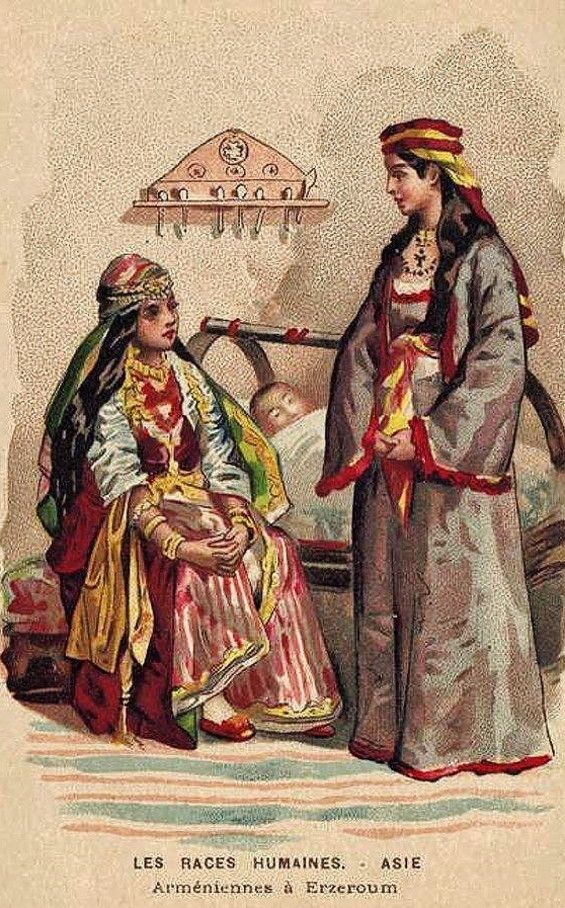
Traditional costume of Erzrum (Karno)

Among ancient historians, the district of Ekeghyats is mentioned under the names Ekelésene or Akilisene. In ancient times, the territory of the district was considerably larger: in addition to Ekeghyats proper, it also included the districts of Daranagh, Mananagh, and Derjan.

=== Province of Karno ===
The Province of Karno occupies a significant part of the territory of the historical province of High Armenia. Concerning High Armenia, the Ashkharatsuyts states: "The first land is High Armenia... and high not only above Armenia, but above all lands; therefore it was called the Land of Katar".

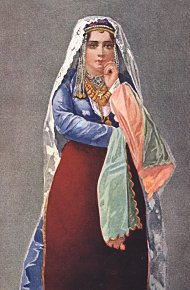
Traditional costume of a woman from Karin, Arshak Fetvadjian

The name Karin has ancient origins. Like the name Kars, it is connected with the Armenian tribal name of the Karinites, who inhabited this part of the Armenian Highlands in ancient times. The district, together with its surroundings, was first annexed to Greater Armenia by Artaxias I (189–160 BCE).

Karin is one of the ancient Armenian cities with a rich historical past. Mentions of it appear in the works of Strabo, Pliny the Elder, Procopius of Caesarea, Arab chroniclers, Armenian traditions, and in the writings of Movses Khorenatsi, Pavstos Buzand, Sebeos, Ghazar Parpetsi, Hovhannes Draskhanakerttsi, Stepanos Orbelian, Arakel Davrizhetsi, and others.

The city of Karin was connected with neighboring and distant countries through five major trade routes. Karin had a large international market where both Russian and European goods were sold. The population of the city was mainly engaged in crafts and trade. Among the widespread crafts in Karin were jewelry-making, tailoring, shoemaking, coppersmithing, and the making of weapons.
