= Gregorids =

Gregorids were an Armenian noble family descended from St. Gregory the Illuminator (c. 257–330) and his wife Julitta (or Mariam) of Armenia, and thus of Arsacid stock, whose members served as patriarchs of Armenia from the early fourth century to the death of its last male member, St. Sahak I Souren Pahlav, in 437/439. Following Sahak's death, his daughter, Sahakanoysh Souren Pahlav, princess of Armenia, carried the Gregorid domains in the western provinces of Greater Armenia into the family of her husband, Hamazasp I Mamikonian, and the patriarchate of Armenia ceased to be a hereditary office.
