= Khatchik =

Khatchík or Khatchig is an Armenian given name (now it is a diminutive of Khachatur). Notable people with the name include:

- Khachig I — Catholicos of the Armenian Apostolic Church between 973 and 992
- Khachik II of Cilicia, Catholicos of the Armenian Apostolic Church between 1058 and 1065
- Gurgen-Khachik Artsruni (died 1003) — Lord of Rechtuniq, King of Vaspurakan (991-1003) — Brother of Ashot-Sahak
- Khachik Abrahamyan (born 1960), Armenian artist
- Khachik Dashtents (1910–1974), Soviet Armenian writer and translator
- Khatchig Babikian (1924–1999), philanthropist, attorney, former member of the Lebanese Parliament (1957–1999), Lebanese politician of Armenian origin.
- Khachik Babayan (born 1956), Iranian Armenian violinist
- Khachik Manukyan (born 1964), Armenian poet
- Khatchig Mouradian, Armenian-American journalist and academic
- Khachig Oskanian (1818–1895), Armenian-American journalist and writer
- Khachig Tölölyan (born 1944), Armenian-American scholar

== See also ==
- Khachik Formation, geological formation in Transcaucasia
