= Khachik =

Khachik may refer to:

- Khatchik (disambiguation), a given name
- Khachik, Armenia, a town
- Khachik, Iran, a village
