= Derenik-Ashot of Vaspurakan =

10th-century King of Vaspurakan

Derenik-Ashot Artsruni Դերենիկ-Աշոտ Արծրունի
- King of Vaspurakan
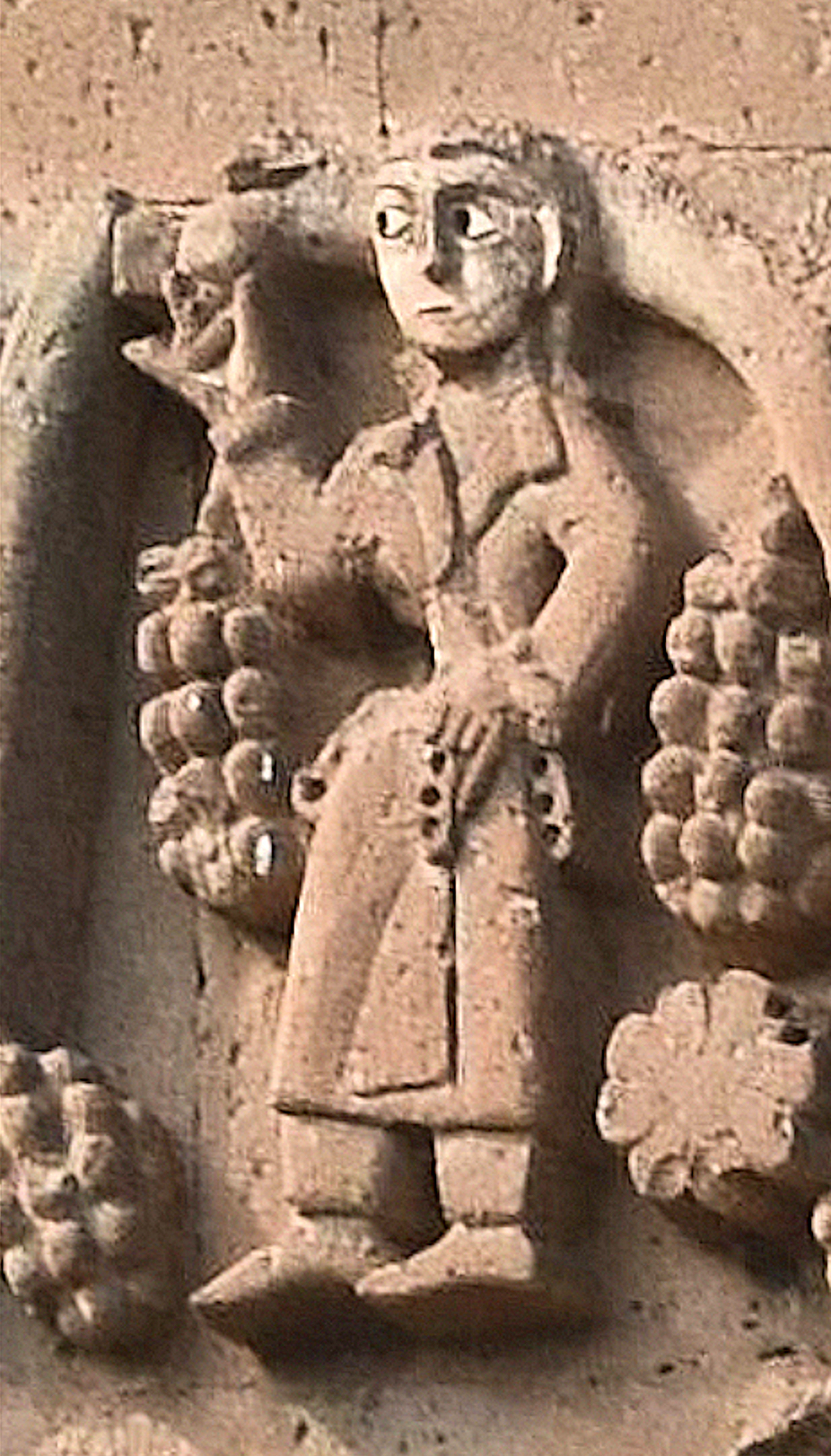
- Engraving on the Cathedral of the Holy Cross, Aghtamar
- Reign: 937/943–958/959
- Coronation: 937/943
- Predecessor: Gagik I
- Successor: Abusahl-Hamazasp
- Died: 958/959
- House: Artsruni
- Father: Gagik I

Derenik-Ashot Artsruni (Armenian: Դերենիկ-Աշոտ Արծրունի; died 958/959) was the second King of Vaspurakan, from the Artsruni dynasty, succeeding his father, Gagik I, on the latter's death. He died in 958/959 and was succeeded by his younger brother Abusahl-Hamazasp.

His daughter's name was Sofy

Regnal titles
Preceded by Gagik I	King of Vaspurakan; 937/943–958/959	Succeeded by Abusahl-Hamazasp
