= Senekerim-Hovhannes Artsruni =

King of Vaspurakan from 1003 to 1021

Senekerim-Hovhannes Սենեքերիմ-Հովհաննես
- King of Vaspurakan
- Reign: 1003–1021
- Predecessor: Gurgen-Khachik
- Successor: Byzantine annexation
- Died: 1025 or 1027
- Consort: Khushush
- Issue: David Artsruni; Atom; Abu Sahl; Constantine; Maria; S.n.ghar
- House: Artsruni
- Father: Abusahl-Hamazasp

Senekerim-Hovhannes Artsruni (Armenian: Սենեքերիմ-Հովհաննես Արծրունի), also known variously as Senekerim-John, Sennecherim or Sennacherib-John, known in Byzantine sources simply as Senachereim (Greek: Σεναχηρείμ), was the sixth and last King of Vaspurakan, from the Artsruni dynasty. In 1021/22, he surrendered his kingdom to the Byzantine emperor Basil II, receiving in return extensive lands in the Empire, and the governorship of Cappadocia.

== Life ==
Senekerim-Hovhannes was the youngest son of Abusahl-Hamazasp. He had two older brothers, Ashot-Sahak and Gurgen-Khachik. On the death of Abusahl in 968, the kingdom was divided among his three sons, and Ashot, as the eldest, retained the royal title and the suzerainty over his younger brothers. On his death, royal power was usurped by the second son, Gurgen, who reigned as king until his own death in 1003.

In 1000, when the Byzantine emperor Basil II visited the East and annexed the principality of Tao, both Senekerim and his brother Gurgen visited him and paid him homage, receiving rich gifts in return. According to Stephen of Taron, Basil also sent letters to the neighbouring Muslim potentates declaring that Vaspurakan was under his protection, and warning them to stop their raids. Matthew of Edessa on the other hand reports that Basil concluded a treaty of alliance with the two brothers.

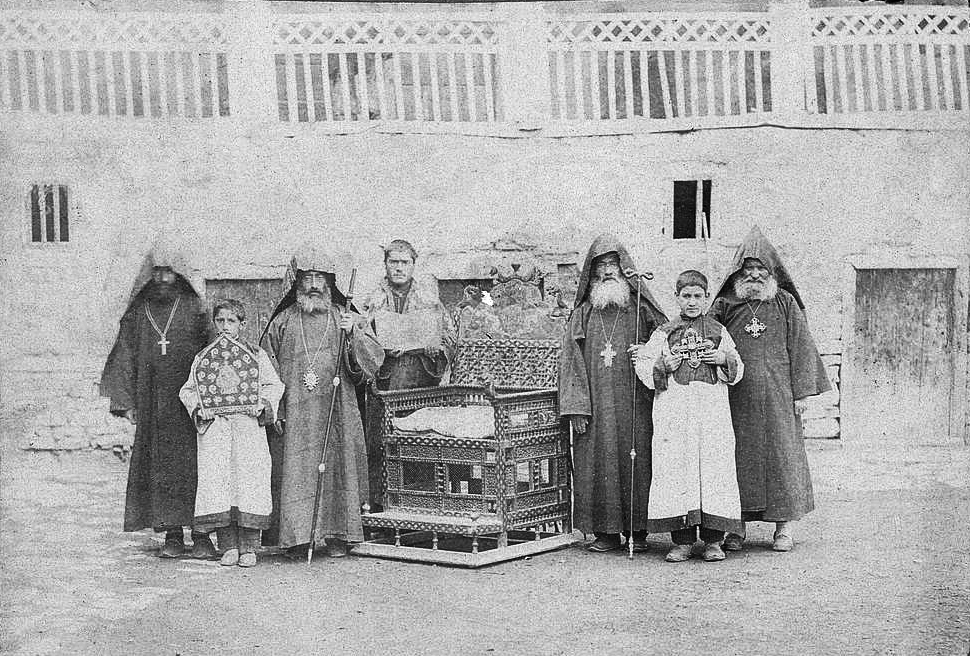
The throne of Senekerim-Hovhannes Artsruni c.1880-1892

Following Gurgen's death in 1003, Senekerim also withheld power from his nephews and crowned himself king. Throughout his reign, his position on the throne remained insecure, partly due to his usurpation, and partly due to the ever mounting raids of various Turkmen groups. As a result he approached Basil, along with his relative, the Artsruni ruler of Andzevatsi, offering to surrender their realms to the Empire in exchange for large domains in eastern Asia Minor. Mounting Turkish pressure, and especially a devastating raid in 1018/19, in which the Armenian army proved unable to counter the Turkish horse archers, eventually led to the cession of Vaspurakan being realized in the winter of 1021/22. The entire realm, comprising 72 fortresses and 3,000 to 4,400 villages, according to contemporary accounts, was annexed by the Byzantines and became the new theme (province) of Asprakania or Upper Media. Basil Argyros became the new province's first governor.

In recompense, Senekerim received the title of patrikios and the post of strategos of the theme of Cappadocia, as well as possession of the cities of Sebasteia, Larissa, Abara and many other settlements. He was followed west by his family and 14,000 retainers. Several of Senekerim's relatives likewise received titles and gifts from the Emperor.

Senekerim died in 1025 or 1027, although Matthew of Edessa erroneously places his death in 1029/30. He was succeeded by his eldest son David.

== Family ==
Senekerim was married to a lady called Khushush (Χουσούσα, Chousousa, in Greek). He had four sons, David, Atom, Abu Sahl, and Constantine, and apparently two daughters, including Mariam of Vaspurakan, the first wife of the Georgian king George I, and another, whose name is recorded in incomplete form as S.n.ghar.

== Sources ==
- Garsoïan, Nina G. (1997). "The Byzantine annexation of the Armenian kingdoms". In Hovhannisian, Richard G. (ed.). The Armenian People from Ancient to Modern Times. Volume 1, The Dynastic Periods: From Antiquity to the Fourteenth Century. New York: St. Martin's Press. pp. 187–198. ISBN 0-312-10169-4.
- Holmes, Catherine (2005). Basil II and the Governance of Empire (976–1025). Oxford: Oxford University Press. ISBN 978-0-19-927968-5.
- Lilie, Ralph-Johannes; Ludwig, Claudia; Zielke, Beate; Pratsch, Thomas, eds. (2013). "Prosopographie der mittelbyzantinischen Zeit Online". Prosopographie der mittelbyzantinischen Zeit Online. Berlin-Brandenburgische Akademie der Wissenschaften. Nach Vorarbeiten F. Winkelmanns erstellt (in German). De Gruyter.

Regnal titles
| Preceded by Gurgen-Khachik | King of Vaspurakan; 1003–1021 | Vaspurakan annexed by the Byzantine Empire |
