= Abusahl-Hamazasp of Vaspurakan =

10th-century King of Vaspurakan

Abusahl-Hamazasp Աբուսահլ-Համազասպ Արծրունի
- King of Vaspurakan
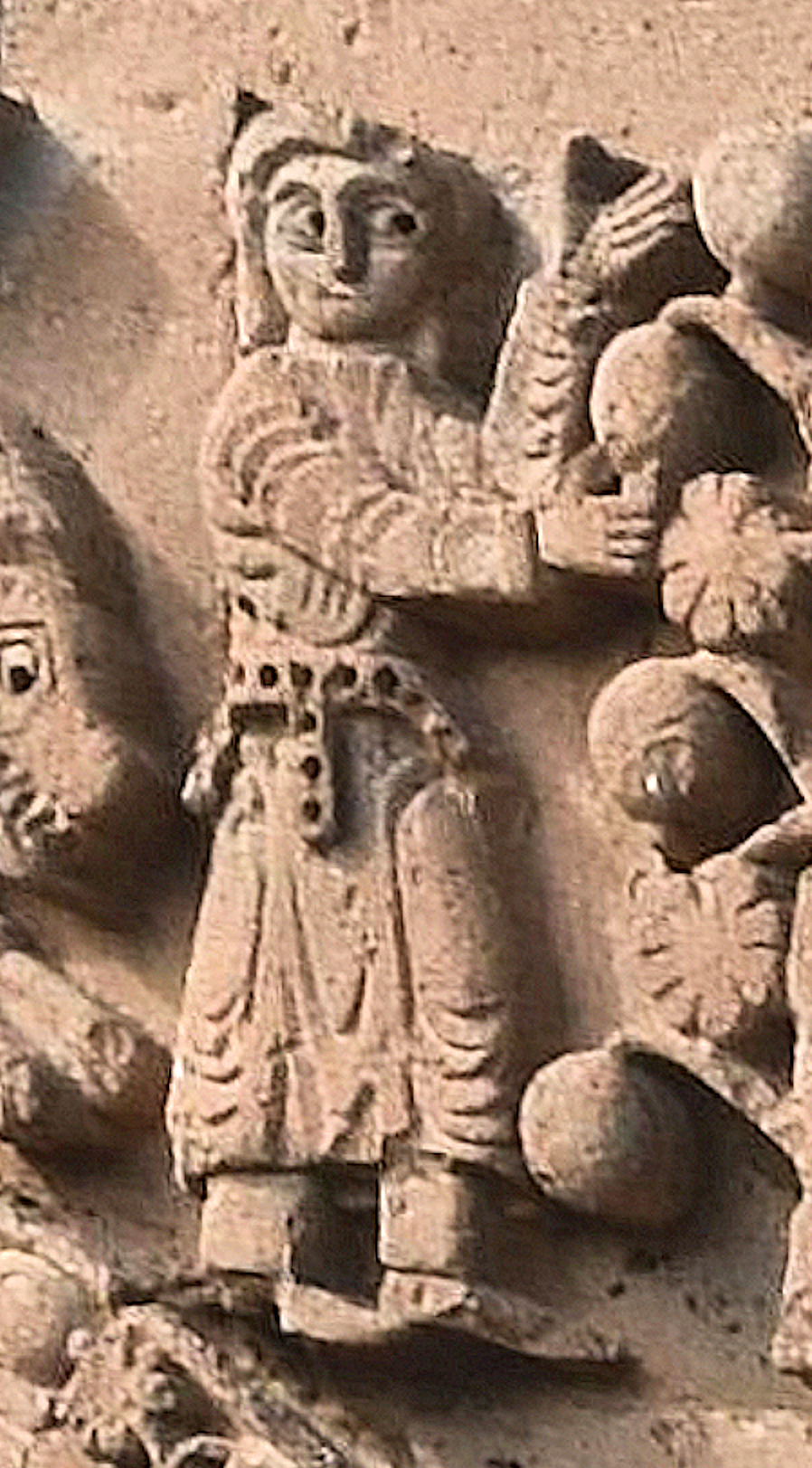
- Engraving on the Cathedral of the Holy Cross, Aghtamar
- Reign: 958/959–968/969
- Coronation: 958/959
- Predecessor: Derenik-Ashot
- Successor: Ashot-Sahak
- Died: 968/969
- Issue: Ashot-Sahak, Gurgen-Khachik of Vaspurakan, Seneqerim-Hovhannes
- House: Artsruni
- Father: Gagik I

Abusahl-Hamazasp Artsruni (Armenian: Աբուսահլ-Համազասպ Արծրունի, died 968/969) was the third King of Vaspurakan, from the Artsruni dynasty, succeeding his childless elder brother, Derenik-Ashot, on the latter's death. On his death in 968/969, his kingdom was divided among his three sons, Ashot-Sahak, Gurgen-Khachik of Vaspurakan, and Seneqerim-Hovhannes, who each became king in succession.

Regnal titles
Preceded by Derenik-Ashot	King of Vaspurakan; 958/959–968/969	Succeeded by Ashot-Sahak
