= Gurgen-Khachik of Vaspurakan =

King of Vaspurakan from 991 to 1003

Gurgen-Khachik Գուրգեն-Խաչիկ
- King of Vaspurakan
- Reign: 991–1003
- Coronation: 991
- Predecessor: Ashot-Sahak
- Successor: Seneqerim-Hovhannes
- Died: 1003
- House: Artsruni
- Father: Abusahl-Hamazasp

Gurgen-Khachik Artsruni (died 1003) was the fifth King of Vaspurakan, from the Artsruni dynasty. On the death of his father Abusahl-Hamazasp in 968/969, the kingdom was divided among his three sons, and Ashot-Sahak, as the eldest, retained the royal title and the suzerainty over his younger brothers. On Ashot's death, Gurgen usurped the throne from Ashot's sons and reigned as king until his own death in 1003. He was succeeded as king by his brother Seneqerim-Hovhannes.

Regnal titles
Preceded by Ashot-Sahak	King of Vaspurakan; 991–1003	Succeeded by Seneqerim-Hovhannes
