= Khachik, Iran =

Khachik خاچيك
- Village
- Location within Iran
- Coordinates: 37°37′18″N 46°40′04″E
- Country: Iran
- Province: East Azerbaijan
- County: Bostanabad
- Bakhsh: Tekmeh Dash
- Rural District: Sahandabad

Population (2006)
  - Total: 139
- Time zone: UTC+3:30 (IRST)
  - Summer (DST): UTC+4:30 (IRDT)

Khachik (Persian: خاچيك, also Romanized as Khāchīk and Khachīk) is a village in Sahandabad Rural District, Tekmeh Dash District, Bostanabad County, East Azerbaijan Province, Iran. At the 2006 census, its population was 139, in 26 families.
