= Khachik Manukyan =

Armenian poet (born 1964)

Khachik Manukyan (born March 3, 1964) is an Armenian poet.

== Biography ==
He was born on March 3, 1964, in Vagharshapat. He studied at secondary school No. 2 of Etchmiadzin. In 1982-1984 he served in the Soviet army. In 1989 he graduated from Yerevan Polytechnic Institute. He has been a member of the Writers' Union of Armenia since 1991. He worked at the "Metsamor" historical and archaeological museum as a senior researcher.

He was the editor of the poetry department of "Aghbyur" children's and youth magazine. Then he worked as General Director of "Culture" Joint Directorate of Etchmiadzin Municipality. His works have been translated into English, French, German, Russian, Persian, Serbian, Polish, Georgian.

== Books ==
=== Translations into English ===
- Contemporary Armenian Poetry, transl. by Diana Der Hovanessian, 2006
- Modern Eastern Armenian Poets, transl. by Samvel Mkrtchyan, 2004

== Awards ==
- "Golden Reed" Armenian State award
- Literary award of the Embassy of the Islamic Republic of Iran in Armenia
- Writer's Union of Armenia Avetik Isahakyan Award (double)
- D. Varoujan Annual Award
- M. Sargsyan Award for the best book (2009)
- "Mother's gratitude" medal
- "St. Grigor Narekatsi" medal of the Mother See of Holy Etchmiadzin
- "Grigor Narekatsi" medal of the RA Ministry of Culture
- Yerkrapah medal
- 1st prize of the Armenia's Ministry of Defense
