= Khatchig Mouradian =

Armenian journalist and academic

Khatchig Mouradian is a journalist and academic who works as a lecturer at Columbia University.

== Life ==
Mouradian was born in an Armenian family in Lebanon. He worked as the editor of the Armenian Weekly. He is the recipient the Gulbenkian Armenian Studies research fellowship to study the Armenian community in China in the 20th century (2014). Mouradian is also the recipient of the first Hrant Dink Freedom and Justice Medal (2014) of the Organization of Istanbul Armenians. In 2016, Mouradian earned the first PhD in Armenian Genocide studies at the Strassler Center for Holocaust and Genocide Studies at Clark University; scholars Taner Akçam, Debórah Dwork, and Raymond Kévorkian formed the committee that approved his dissertation, titled Genocide and Humanitarian Assistance in Ottoman Syria (1915–1917).

== Works ==
- Mouradian, Khatchig (2021). The Resistance Network: The Armenian Genocide and Humanitarianism in Ottoman Syria, 1915–1918. MSU Press. ISBN 978-1-62895-419-7.
- Kieser, Hans-Lukas; Bayraktar, Seyhan; Mouradian, Khatchig (2023). After the Ottomans: Genocide's Long Shadow and Armenian Resilience. Bloomsbury Academic. ISBN 978-1-78831-276-9.
- Kieser, Hans-Lukas; Mouradian, Khatchig (2024). The I.B. Tauris Handbook of the Late Ottoman Empire: History and Legacy. Bloomsbury Academic. ISBN 978-0-7556-4435-3.
