= Cathedral of the Holy Cross, Aghtamar =

Armenian church in Lake Van, Turkey

Cathedral of the Holy Cross
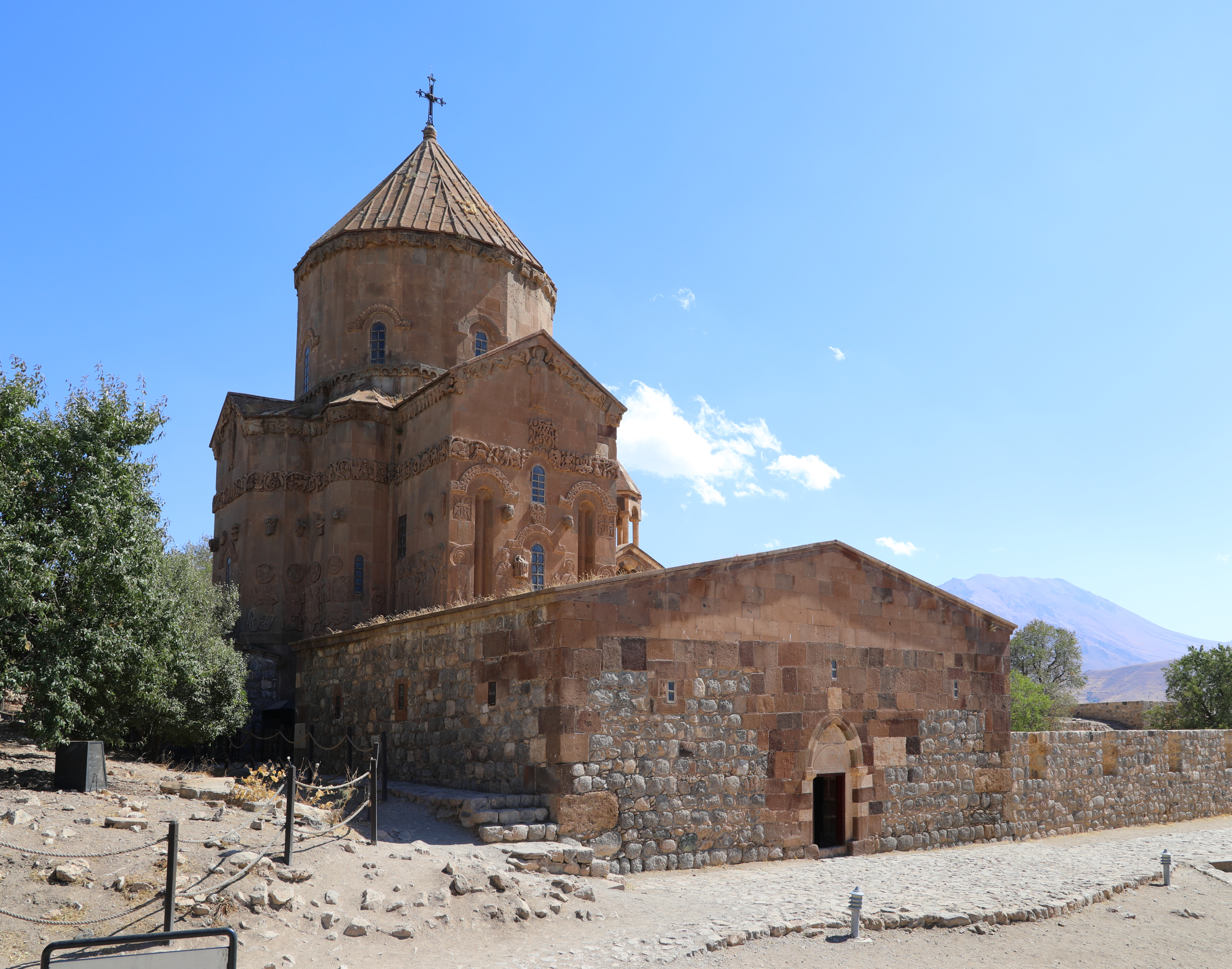
- The cathedral in 2022

- Location within Turkey

Religion
- Affiliation: Armenian Apostolic Church
- Ecclesiastical or organisational status: Museum
- Status: Ceased functioning as a monastery after the Armenian genocide in 1915

Location
- Location: Akdamar Island, Lake Van, Turkey
- Coordinates: 38.3403°N 43.0369°E

Architecture
- Architect: Manuel
- Style: Armenian
- Groundbreaking: 915
- Completed: 921

The Cathedral of the Holy Cross (Armenian: Սուրբ Խաչ եկեղեցի, romanized: Surp Khachʿ egeghetsʿi, Turkish: Aghtamar Kilisesi or Surp Haç Kilisesi) on Aghtamar Island, in Lake Van in eastern Turkey, is a medieval Armenian Apostolic cathedral, built in 921 as a palatine church for the kings of Vaspurakan and later serving as the seat of the Catholicosate of Aghtamar. After the Armenian genocide in 1915, it got abandoned and now turned into a museum.

== History ==
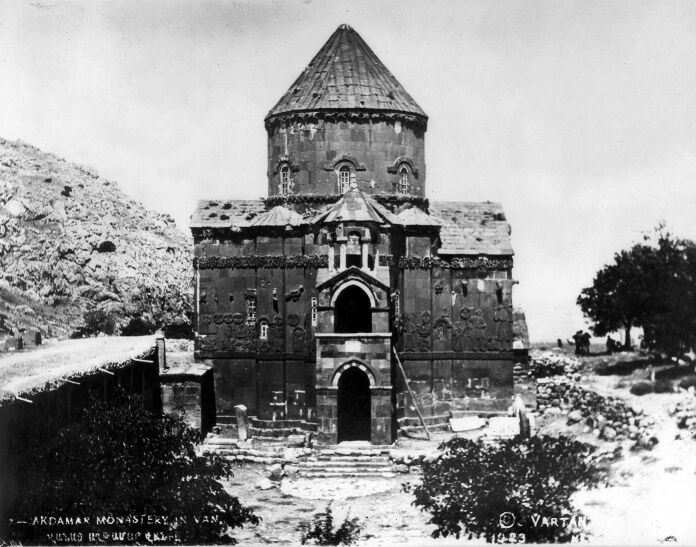
The cathedral in 1923, after the Armenian genocide.

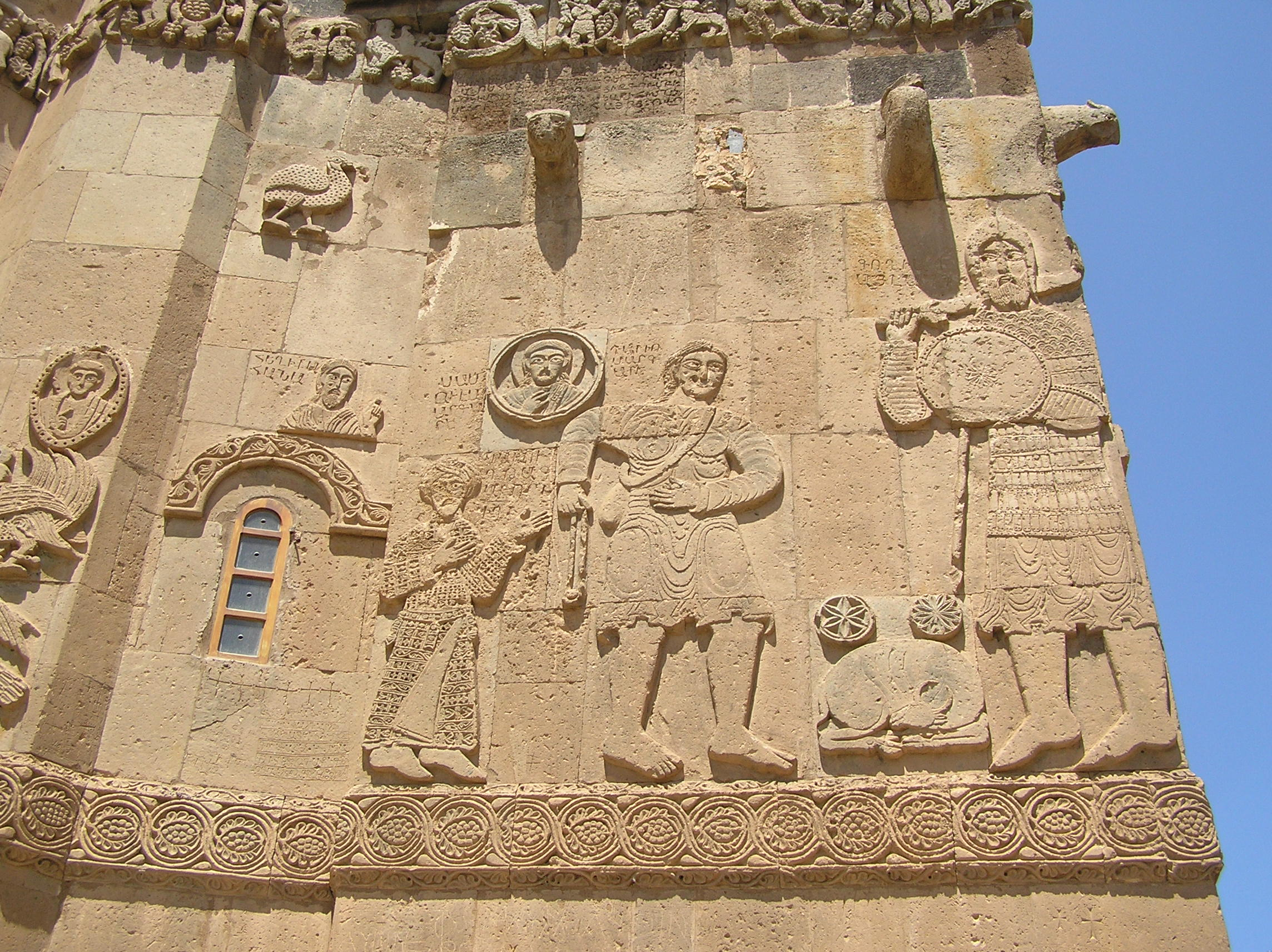
A detail of David and Goliath from the cathedral.

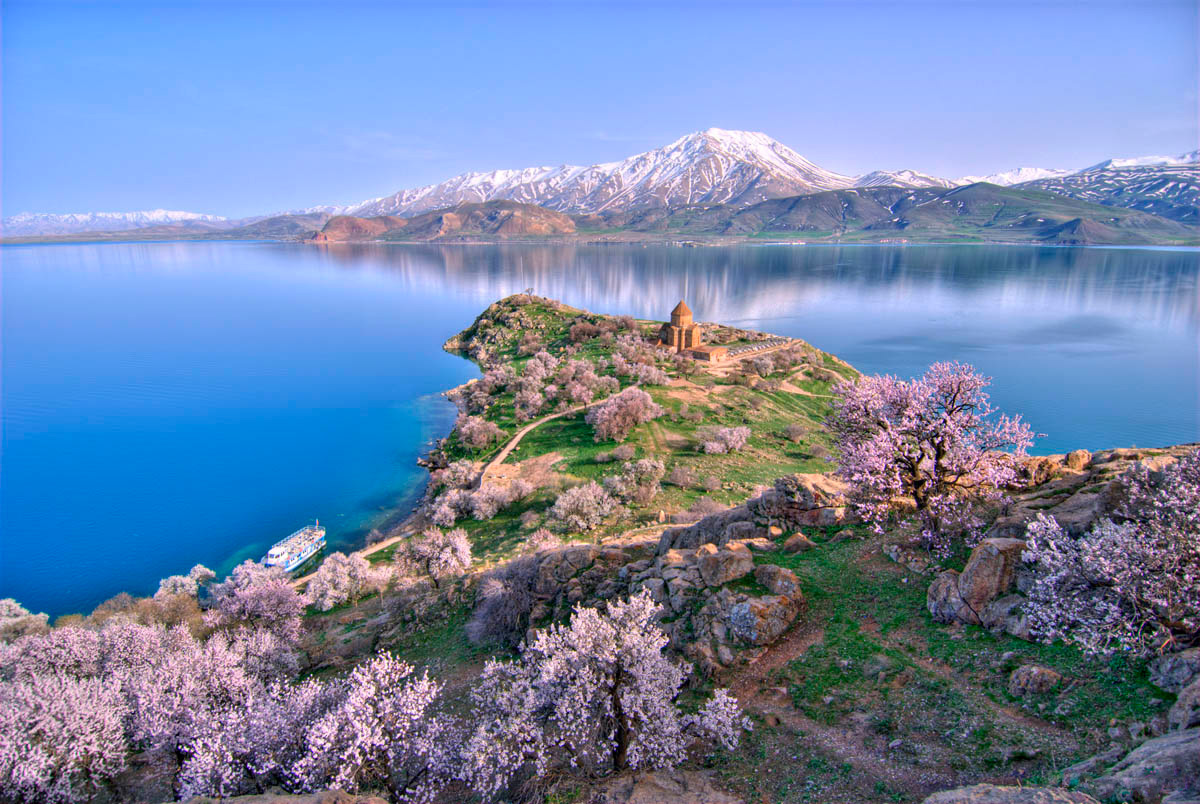
General view of Akdamar Island in springtime.

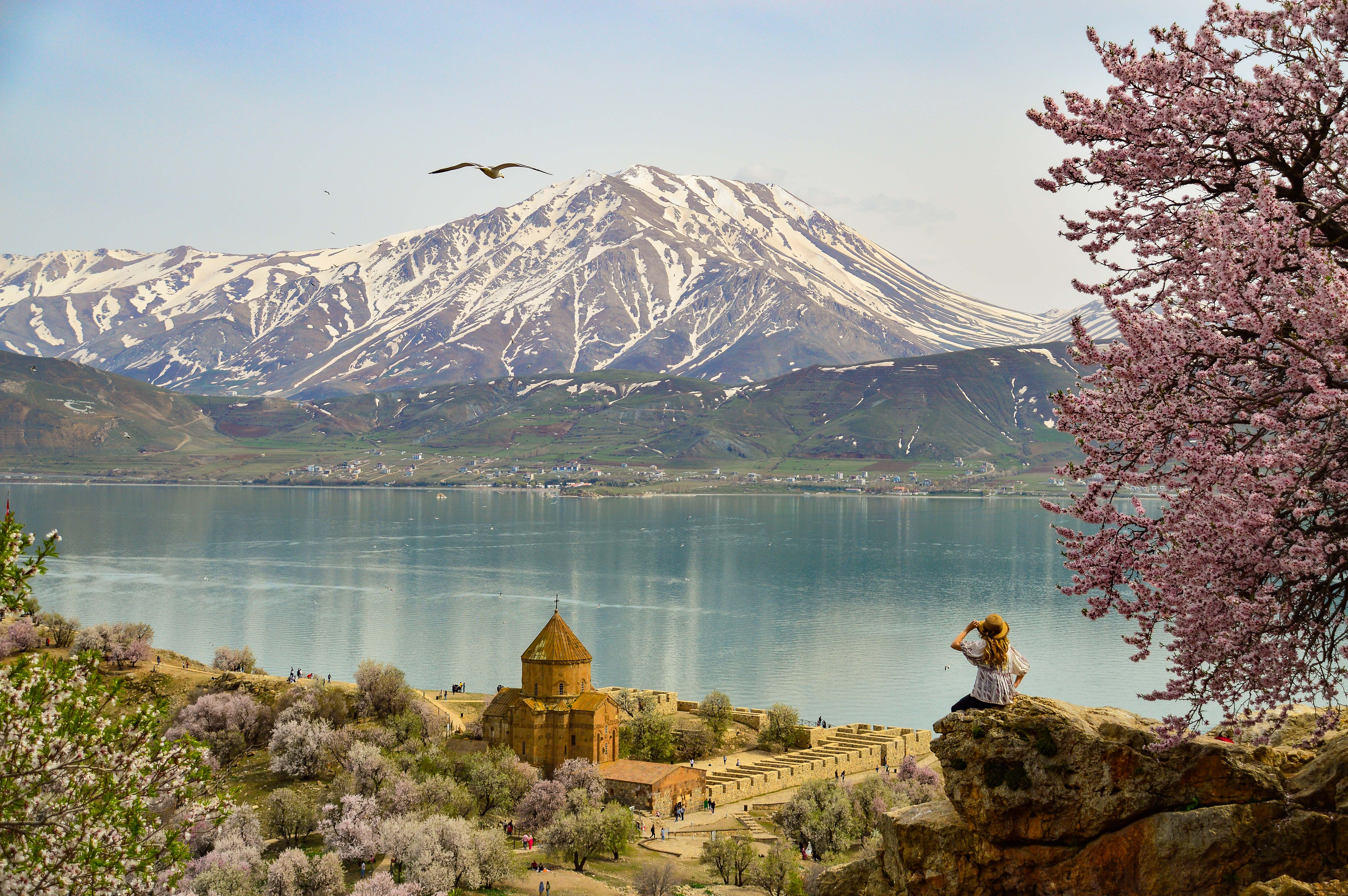
General view of Akdamar Island in springtime.

During his reign, King Gagik I Artsruni (r. 908–943/944) of the Armenian kingdom of Vaspurakan chose the island of Aght'amar as one of his residences, founding a settlement there. The only structure standing from that period is the cathedral. It was built of pink volcanic tufa(tuff) by the architect-monk Manuel during the years 915–921, with an interior measuring 14.80 m by 11.5 m and the dome reaching 20.40 m above ground. In later centuries, and until 1915, it formed part of a monastic complex, the ruins of which can still be seen to the south of the church.

Between 1116 and 1895 Aght'amar Island was the location of the Armenian Catholicosate of Aght'amar. Khachatur III, who died in 1895, was the last Catholicos of Aght'amar. In 1915, during the Armenian genocide, the church was looted, and the monastic buildings destroyed and in July 1916 the Catholicosate was abolished by the Ottoman Empire.

The church remained in disuse through the decades after 1915. When the writer and journalist Yaşar Kemal visited the island of Akhtamar in 1951, he discovered that it was about to be demolished. Using his contacts he helped stop the planned destruction. The church became a noted tourist attraction in the coming decades. In 2005 the structure was closed to visitors as it underwent a heavy restoration, being opened as a museum by the Turkish government a year later.

== Architecture ==
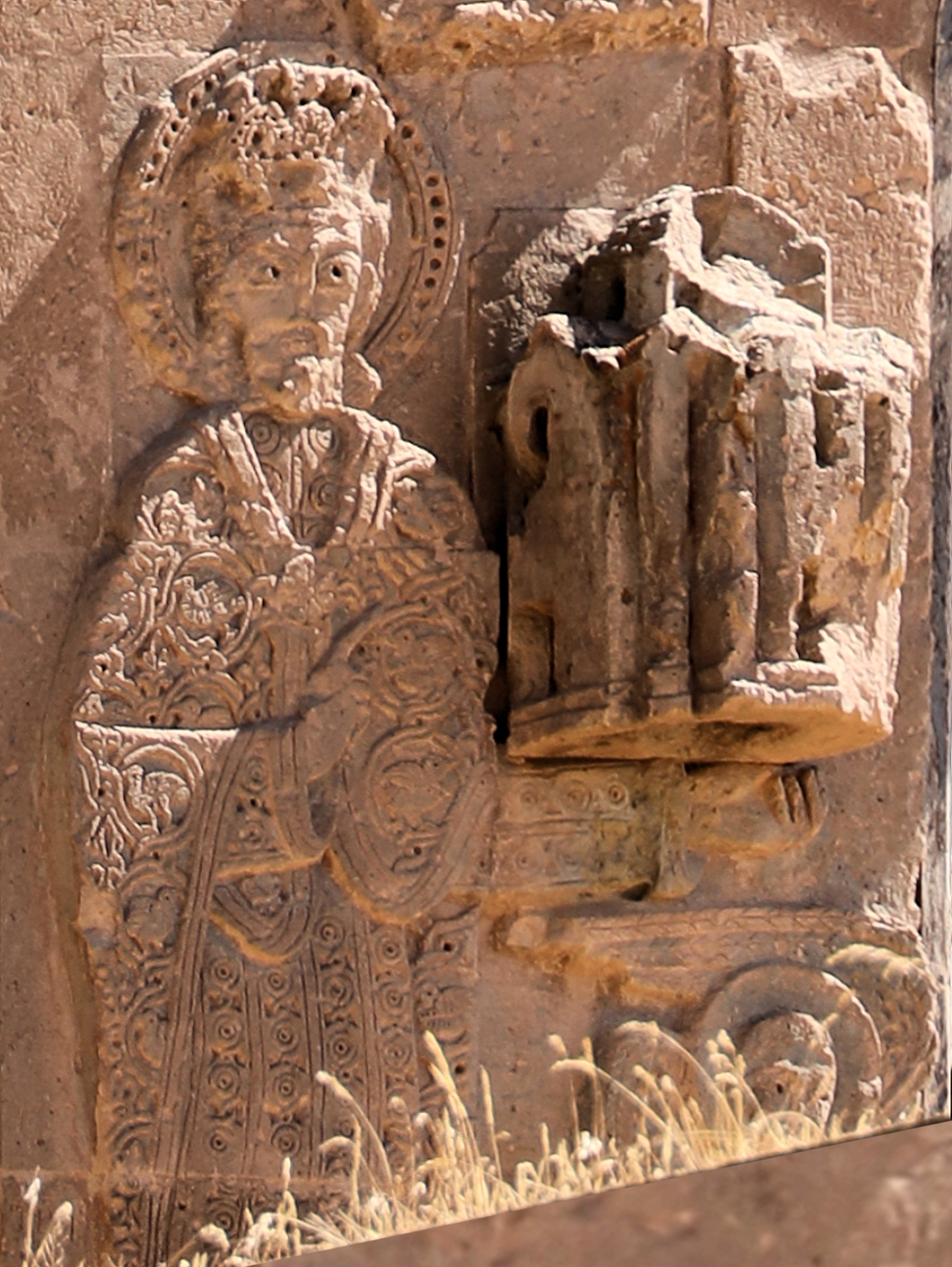
Gagik I Artsruni sculpture at Cathedral of the Holy Cross, Аghtamar

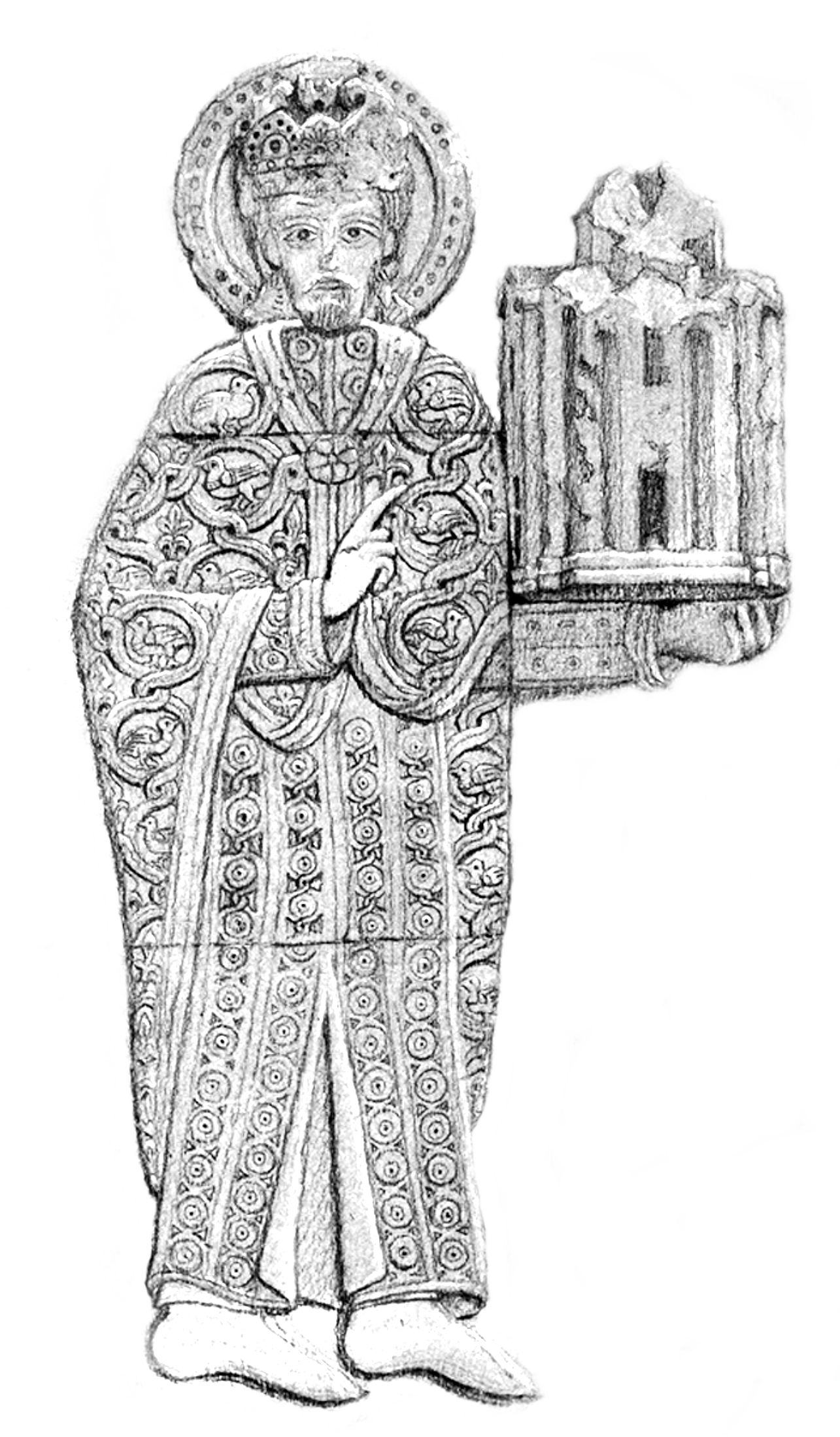
Reconstruction of sculpture

The architecture of the church is based on a form that had been developed in Armenia several centuries earlier; the best-known example being that of the seventh century Saint Hripsime Church in Echmiadzin.

The unique importance of the Cathedral Church of the Holy Cross comes from the extensive array of bas-relief carving of mostly biblical scenes that adorn its external walls. The meanings of these reliefs have been the subject of much and varied interpretation. Some of this is speculation – for example, a few sources interpret Islamic and Turkic influences behind the artistic rendering of the reliefs, syncretised with Armenian influences. Some scholars assert that the friezes parallel contemporary motifs found in Umayyad art – such as a turbaned prince, Arab styles of dress, wine imagery; allusions to royal Sassanian imagery are also present (Griffins, for example). The correspondence with the so-called Hellenizing Ulu Cami in Harran with similar bas-reliefs is also noteworthy. The imagery on the friezes, such as the scenes from Eden, the serpent, Adam and Eve, as well as the method of execution, raised stone-work rather than frescoes or mosaics, is similar in tenor and motif to the work on the porches of the Hagia Sophia Monastic Church in Trebizond. The similarities of the Hagia Sophia in Trebizond to Armenian architectural models and the borrowing of motifs has been noted by art and architectural historians.

== Vandalism and decay ==
Following World War I, the church was largely officially ignored and thus exposed to extensive vandalism. During the 1950s, the island was used as a military training ground. The ornate stone balustrade of the royal gallery largely disappeared; comparisons with pre-1914 photographs show signs of damage to the relief carvings.

By 1956, two khachkars—one by Catholicos Stephanos, dated to 1340, in addition to a second one, dated to 1444–were visibly damaged, with large sections of their carvings broken or hacked-off. Only the lower-third of the 1444 khachkar was left, noted as it had been visibly intact when photographed by Bachmann in 1911. The 19th-century tombstone of Khatchatur Mokatsi, still intact in 1956, was later smashed into fragments.

== Restoration ==
Between 20 May 2005 and 21 July 2006, the church underwent a controversial restoration program. The restoration had a stated budget of 2 million Turkish lira (approximately 1.4 million USD) and was financed by the Turkish Ministry of Culture. It officially re-opened as a museum on 29 March 2007 in a ceremony attended by the Turkish Minister of Culture, government officials, ambassadors of several countries, Patriarch Mesrob II (spiritual leader of the Armenian community of Turkey), a delegation from Armenia headed by the Deputy to the Armenian Minister of Culture, and a large group of invited journalists from many news organizations around the world.

Özdemir Çakacak, the governor of Van, described the restoration as "a show of Turkey's respect for history and culture". A Turkish state department museum official added, "We could not have ignored the artifacts of our Armenian citizens, and we did not." Signs heralding the church reopening declared "Tarihe saygı, kültüre saygı" ("Respect for history, respect for culture").

According to Maximilian Hartmuth, an academician at Sabanci University, "the church was turned into a museum rather than re-opened as a place of worship following the restoration was, for example, claimed to be a wedge separating the monument from Turkey's Armenian community". The critics, writing for media such as Radikal, Milliyet, or Turkish Daily News, furthermore lamented that permission to mount a cross on top of the church was not given. Moreover, they argued the official name of the museum, the Turkish Akdamar (translating as "white vein") rather than the original Armenian Ahtamar – the name of the island in Lake Van on which the church stands and Surp Haç (Holy Cross) for the church itself would suggest this to be a Turkish monument. At the same time only sparing use was made of the word "Armenian" in official statements, With Turkey's Armenian community not granted their request to hold services in the church – and a large Turkish flag mounted at the site, it was argued by some that this project really announced the "Turkification" of this monument, the initiative being no more than a media stunt.

== Religious life ==
The church is now classed as a secular museum. During the ceremony held to mark the restoration there were images of Mustafa Kemal Atatürk displayed prominently. Armenian religious leaders invited to the opening ceremony refused to attend because the church was being reopened as a secular museum. It has the allowance to hold one religious service per year from the Ministry of Culture and Tourism.

The Turkish government stated that it would permit a liturgy to be delivered on 19 September 2010, and the service took place as planned.

Some controversy surrounded the issue of whether the cross atop the dome until 1915 should be replaced. Some Armenians said that the renovation was unfinished until the cross was replaced, and that prayer should be allowed inside at least once a year. A cross had been prepared nearly a year before the opening, and Mesrob II petitioned the Prime Minister and Minister of Culture to place the cross on the dome of the cathedral. Turkish officials said that the base was not appropriate for the cross the Patriarchate brought as it was made to support the original cross. Later, the issue was solved. Since 2 October 2010, the cross sits at the top of the church.

On 8 September 2013, the rite of baptism was carried out for a group of Armenian boys within the cathedral. This was the first time since World War I that a baptism was performed in Van.

== Controversies ==
=== Naming issue ===
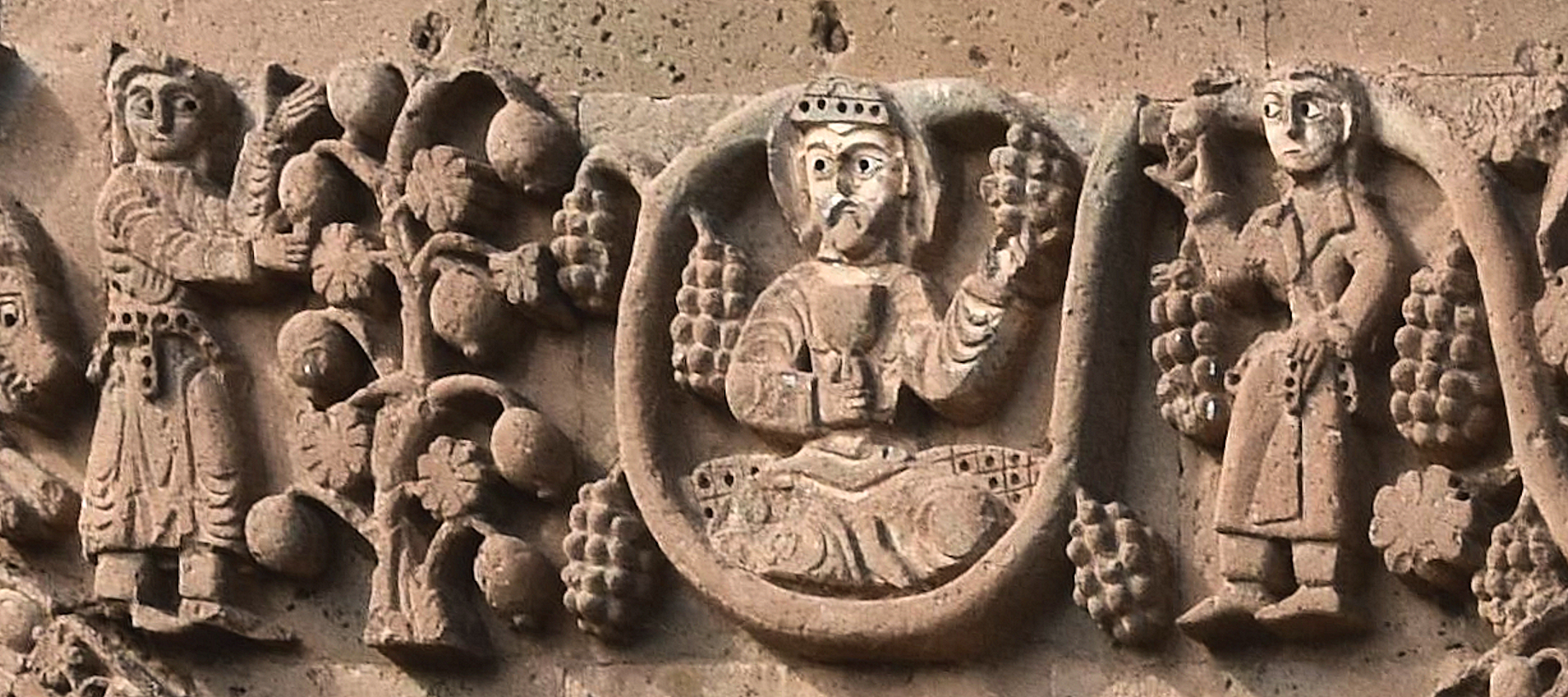
Akdamar, ruler and attendants (915–921)

Hürriyet columnist Cengiz Çandar characterized the way the Turkish government handled the opening as an extension of an ongoing "cultural genocide" of the Armenians. He characterizes the renaming of the church from Armenian to Turkish as part of a broader program to rename Armenian historical sites in Turkey, and attributes the refusal to place a cross atop the church as symptomatic of religious intolerance in Turkish society.

What do you think "our set" are trying to do? If you ask me, they would like "to appear righteous and benefit politically." And naturally they make a mess out of it. The initial plans were for the opening of Ahtamar to take place on Apr. 24. A real cunning idea... As it is known to be the "Armenian Genocide Remembrance Day in the world," a trump for propaganda would have been used on that day. Then the date became Apr. 11. According to the ancient Armenian calendar, Apr. 11 coincides with Apr. 24. They probably knew this also. They were still pursuing another cunning idea. At the end, it was decided that the opening of Ahtamar, now "Akdamar," would take place on Mar. 29, as a restoration opening of a museum-church, without a cross or a bell.

Çandar notes that the Agos issue published on the day of the murder of Hrant Dink featured a Dink commentary on the Turkish government's handling of the Akdamar issue, which the late journalist characterized as "A real comedy... A real tragedy...". According to Dink,

The government hasn't still been able to formulate a correct approach to the "Armenian question." Its real aim is not to solve the problem, but to gain points like a wrestler in a contest. How and when it will make the right move and defeat its opponent. That's the only concern. This is not earnestness. The state calls on Armenian historians to discuss history, but does not shy from trying its own intellectuals who have an unorthodox rhetoric on the Armenian genocide. It restores an Armenian church in the Southeast, but only thinks, "How can I use this for political gains in the world, how can I sell it?"

=== Nationalist protests ===
The opening was controversial among some Turkish nationalist groups, who protested at the island and in a separate demonstration in Ankara. Police detained five Turkish nationalists protesting against the restoration of the church at Lake Van, who carried a banner declaring "The Turkish people are noble. They would never commit genocide". Demonstrators outside the Ministry of the Interior in Ankara chanted slogans against the possibility of a cross being erected atop the church, declaring "You are all Armenians, we are all Turks and Muslims".

=== Answering to criticism ===
Historian Ara Sarafian responded to the criticism of the restoration project, stating that the project represented an answer to allegations of cultural genocide. He stated that the revitalization of the site was "an important peace offering" from the Turkish government.

== Gallery ==
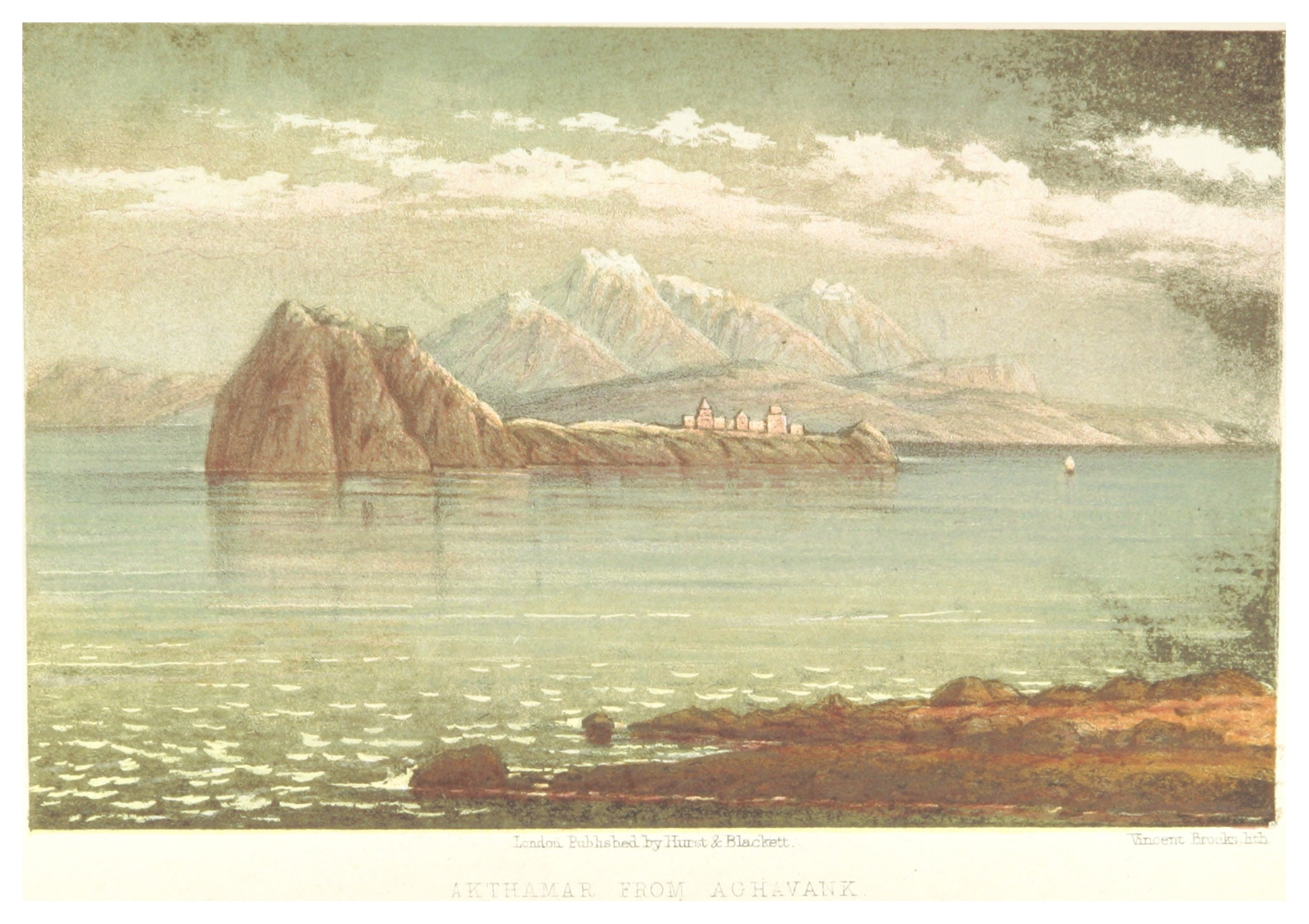
Aghtamar in 1865.

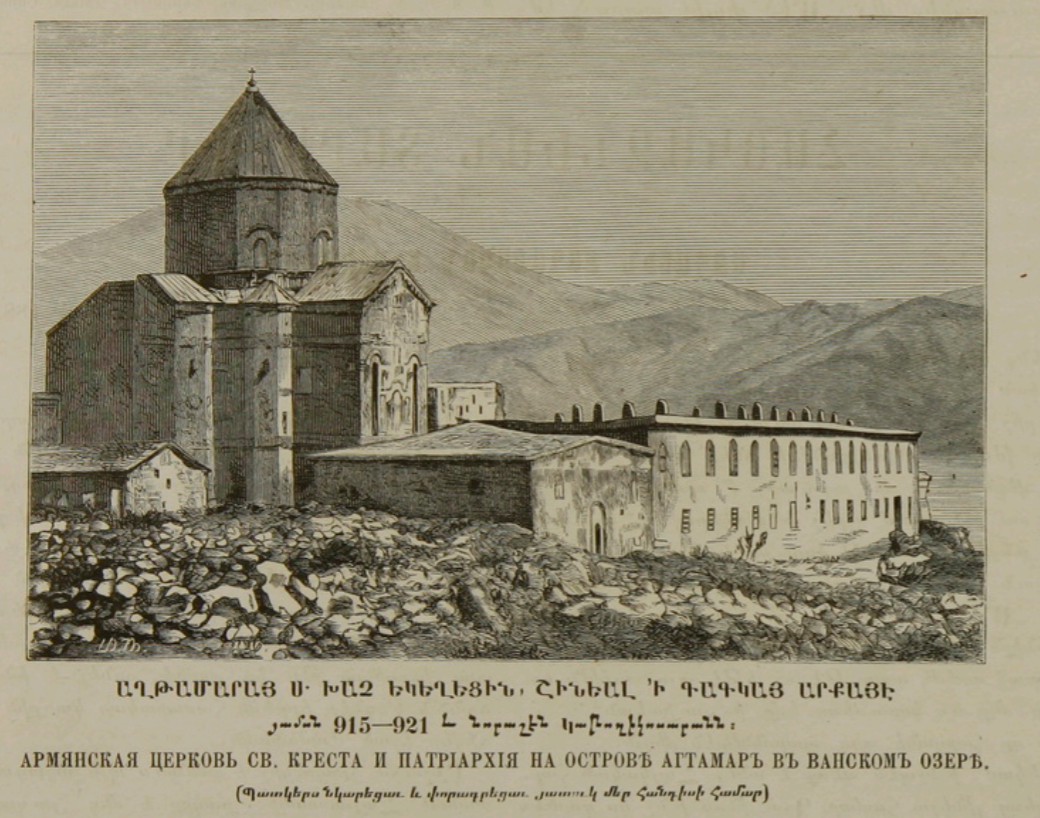
Aghtamar in 1881.

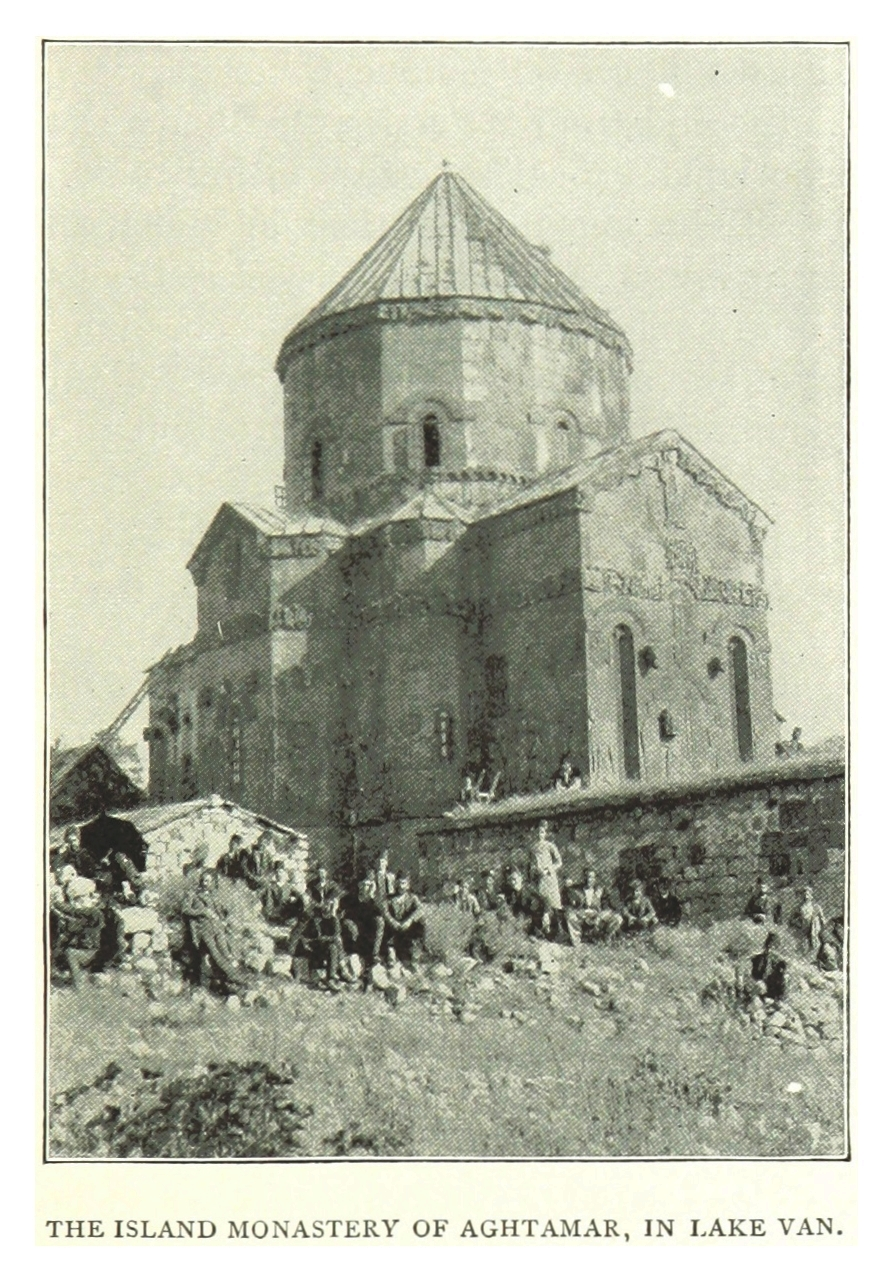
Aghtamar in 1895.

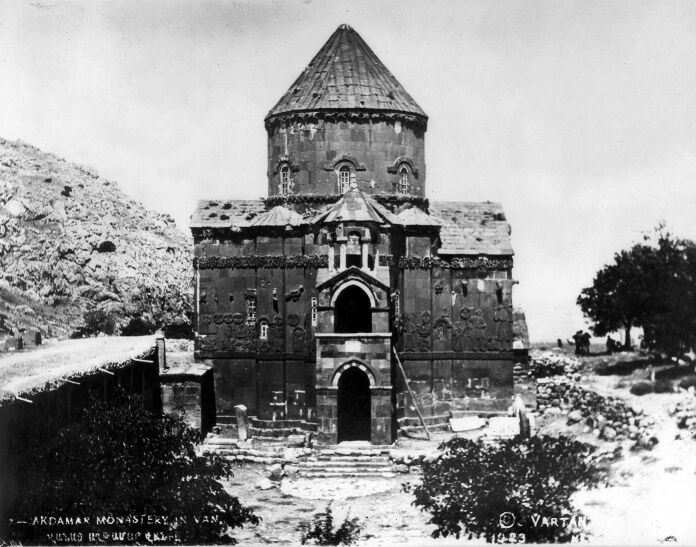
Aghtamar in 1923.

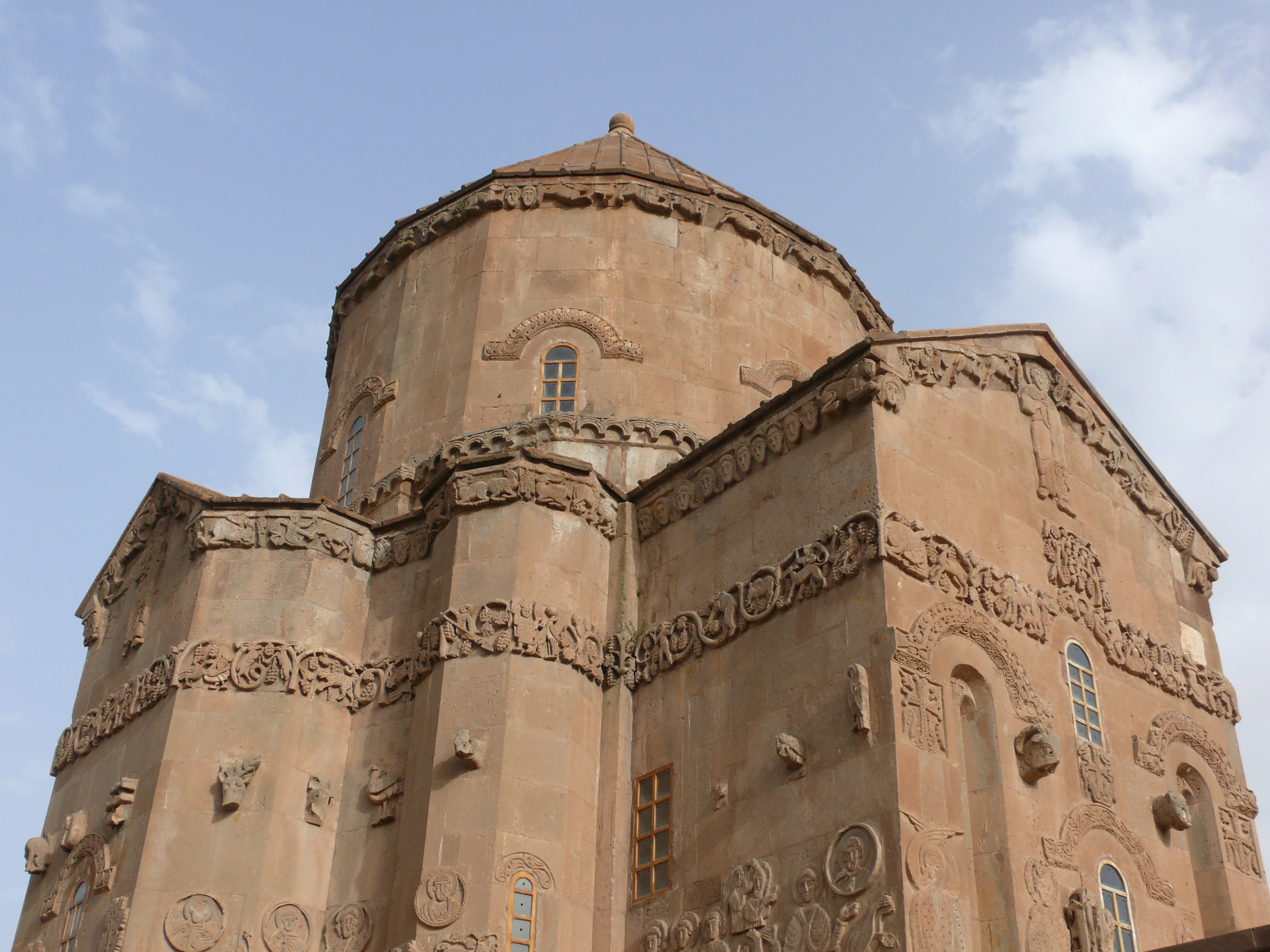

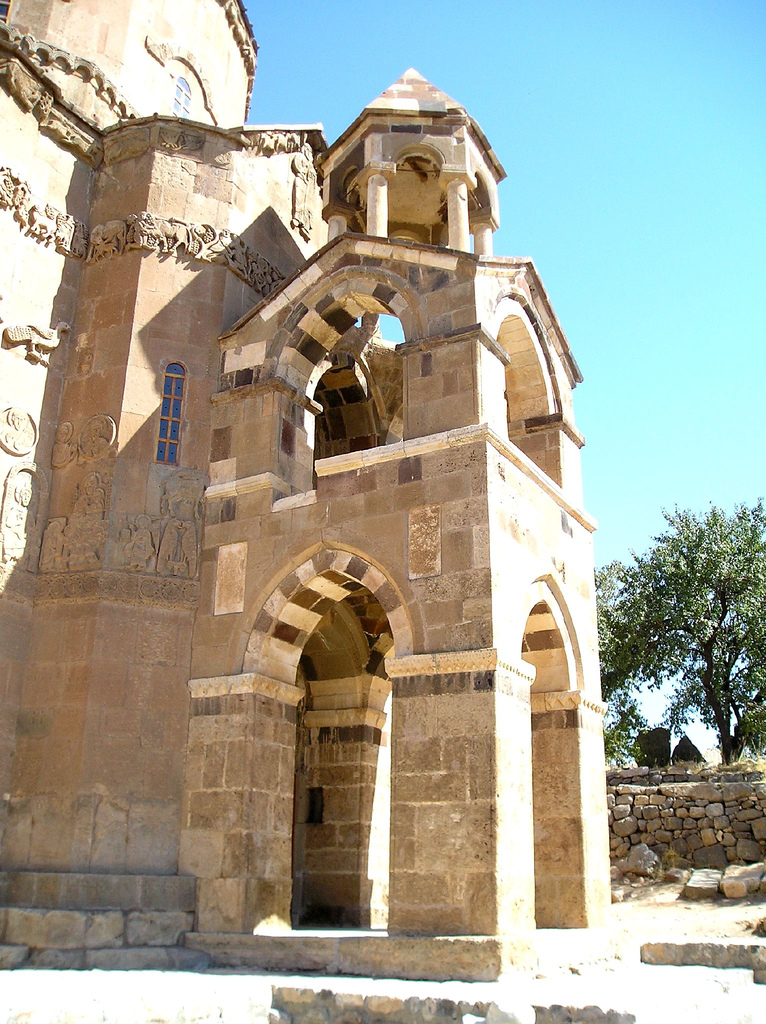

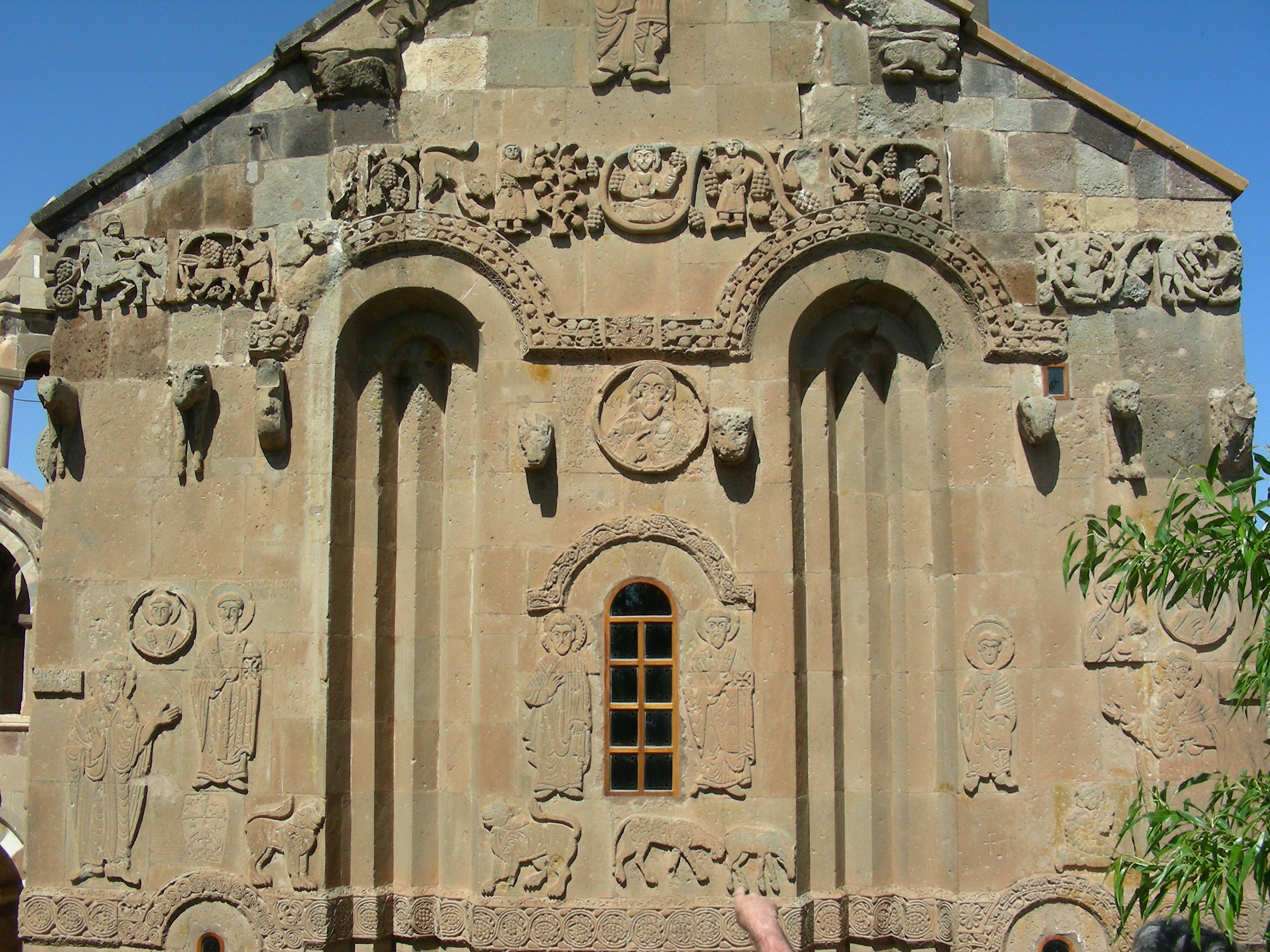

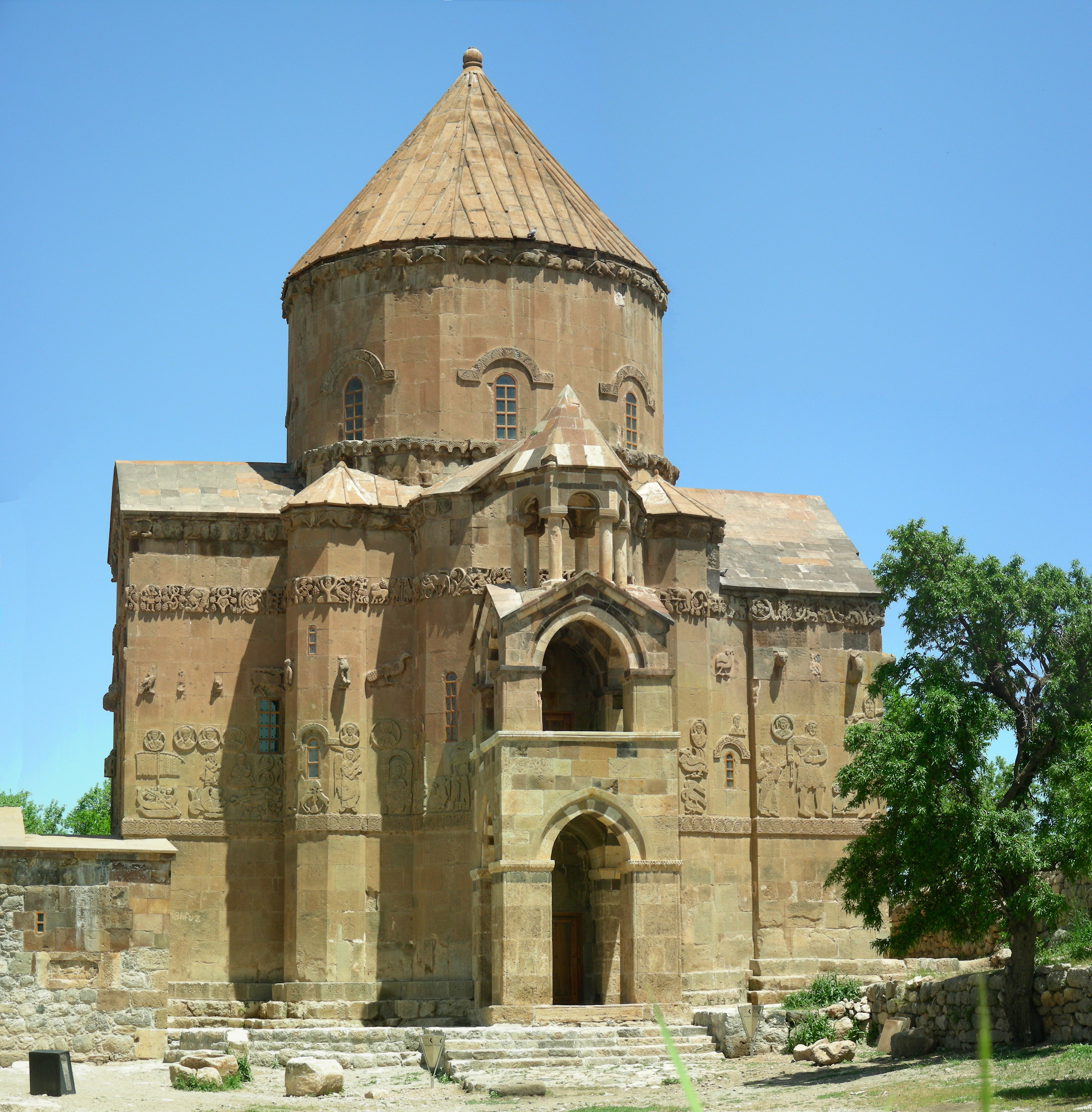

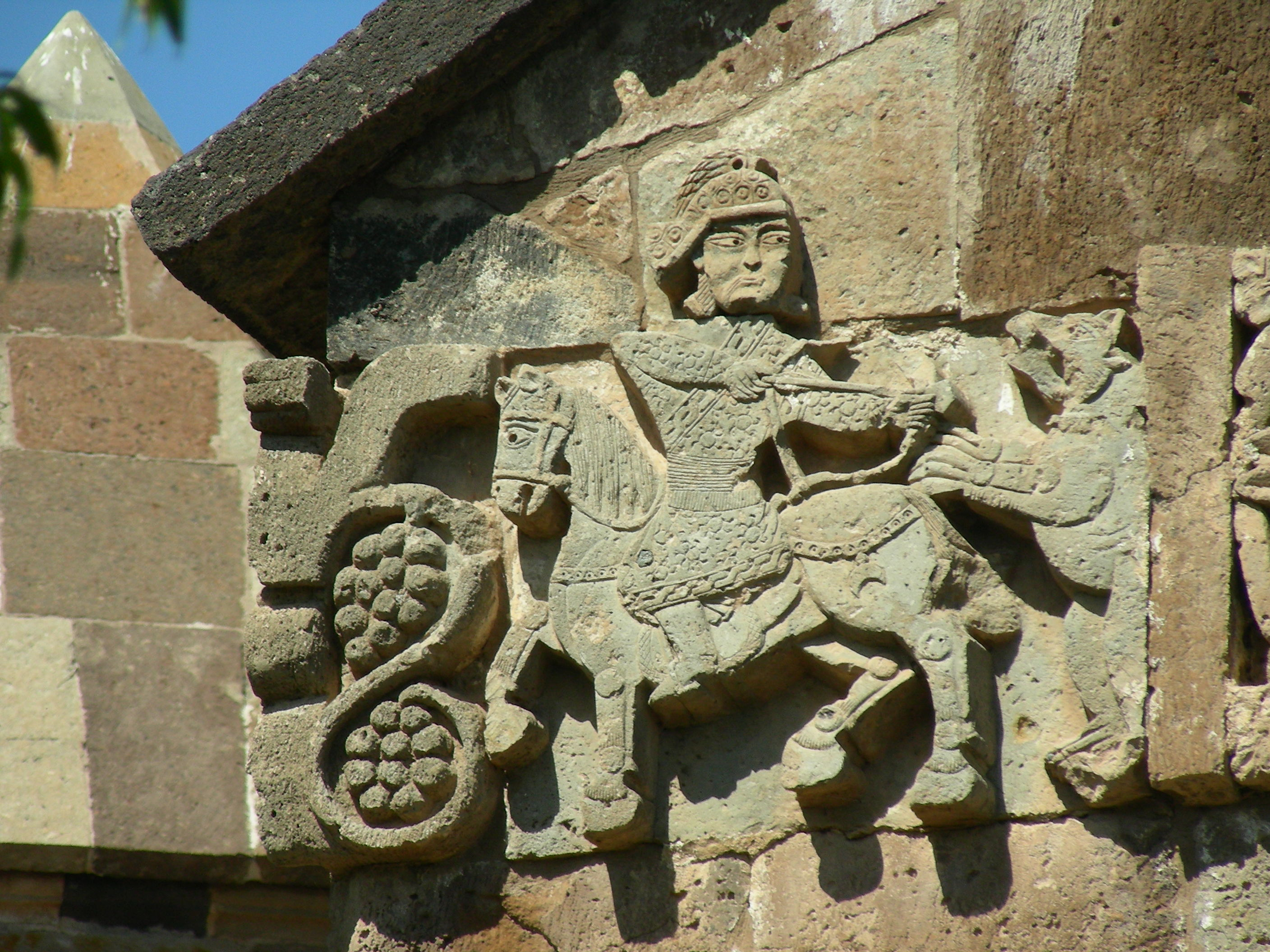

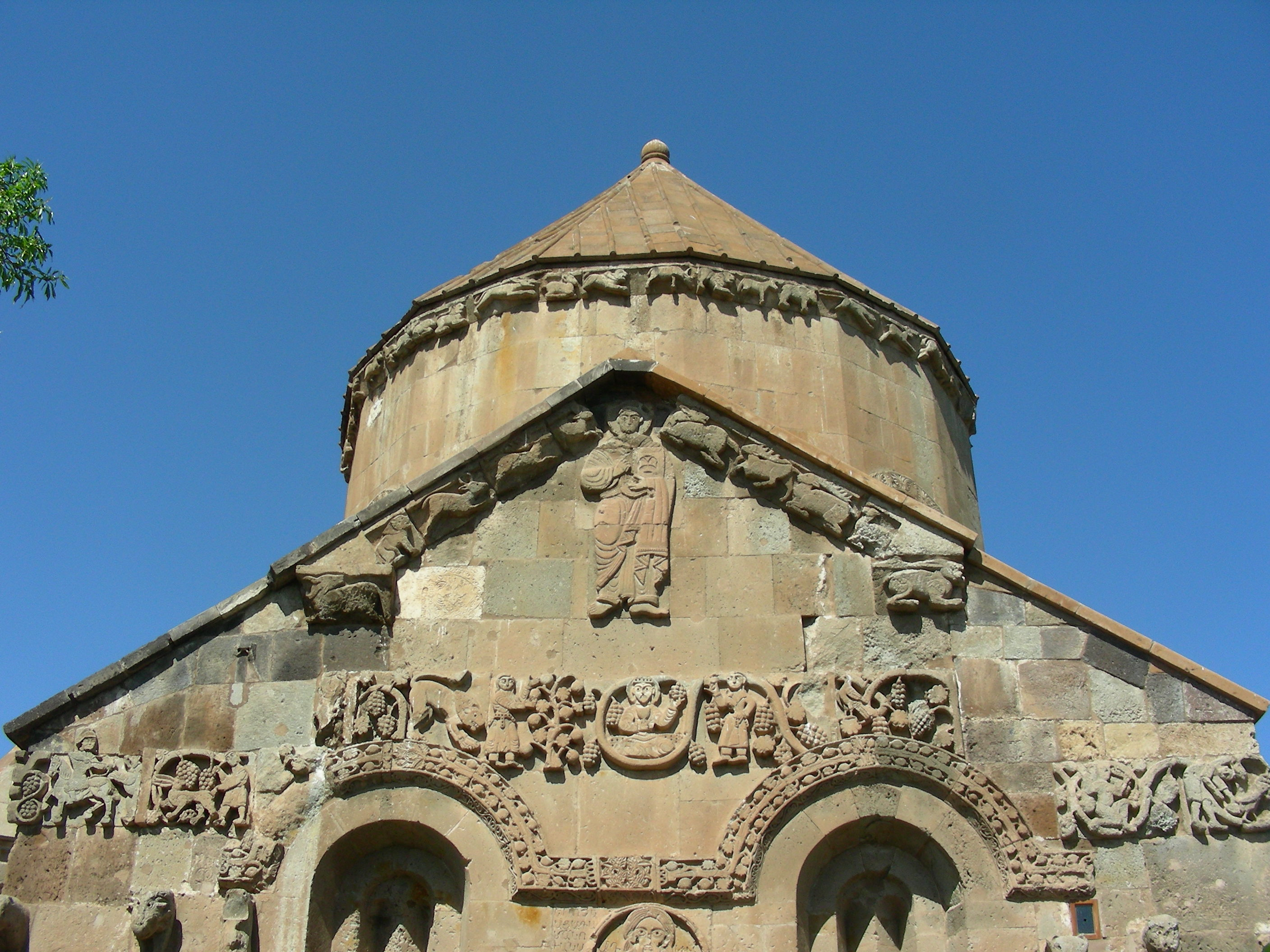

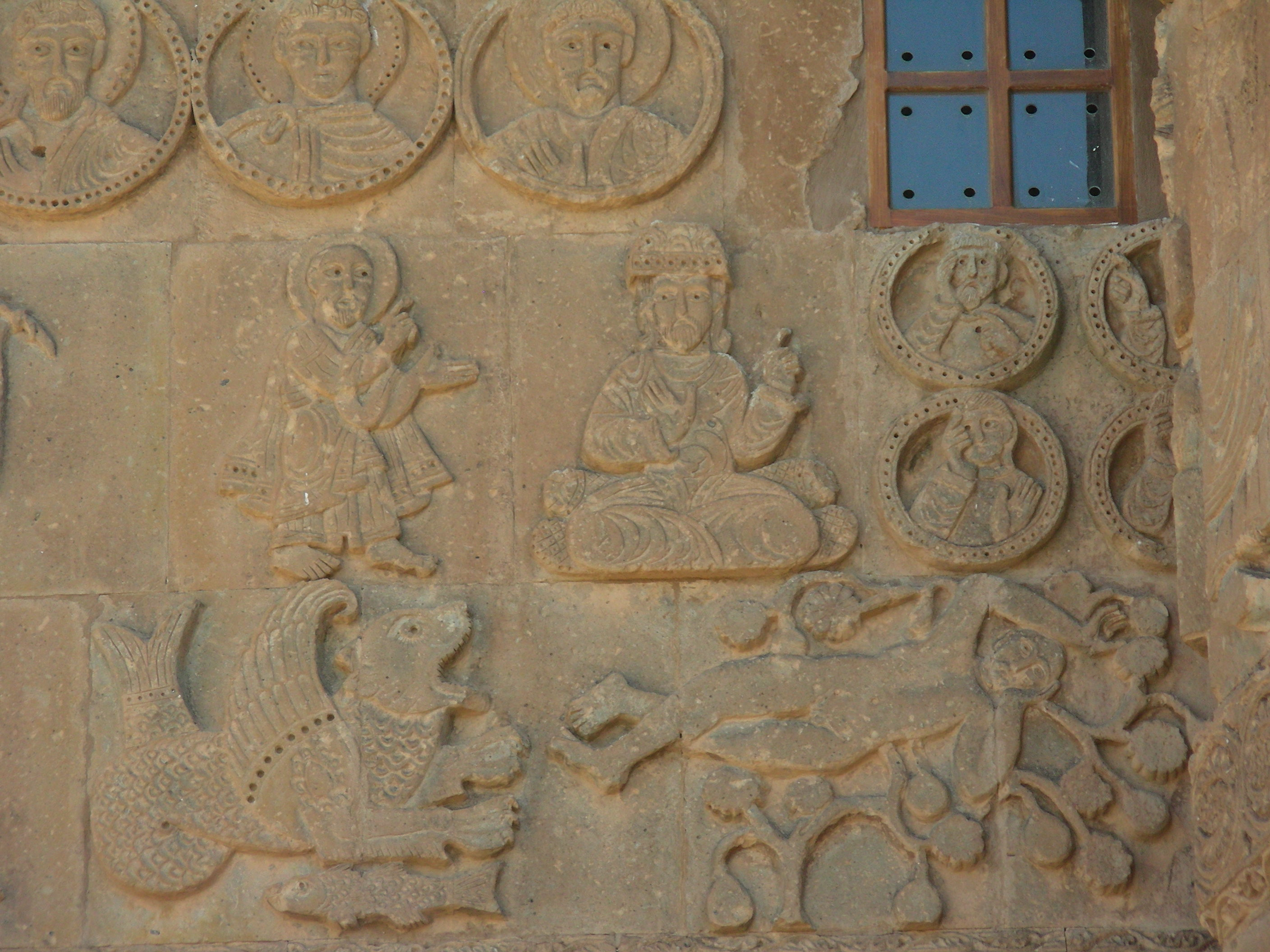

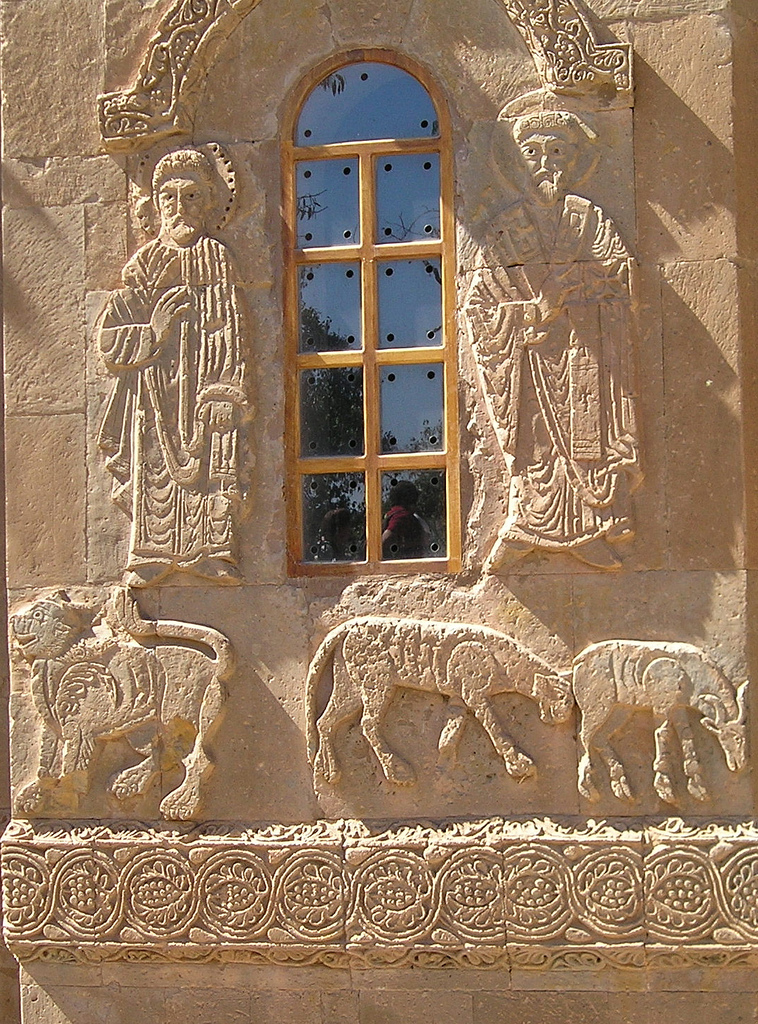

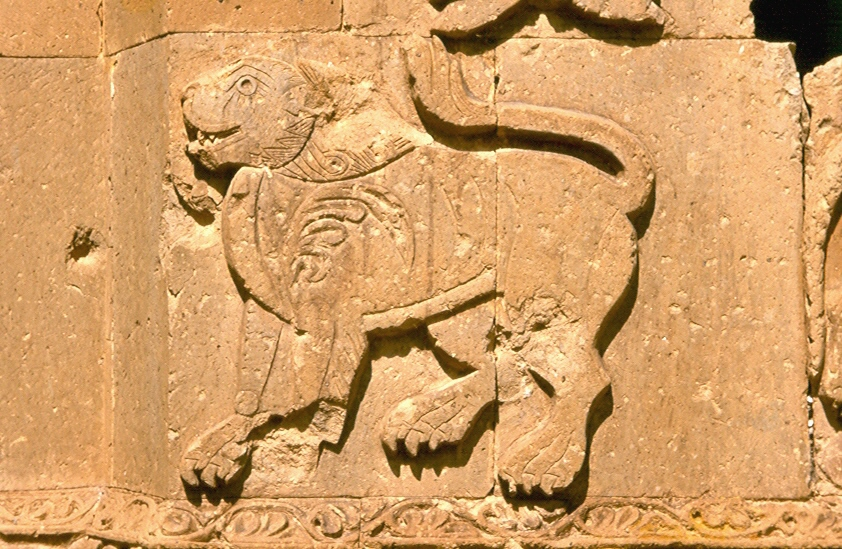

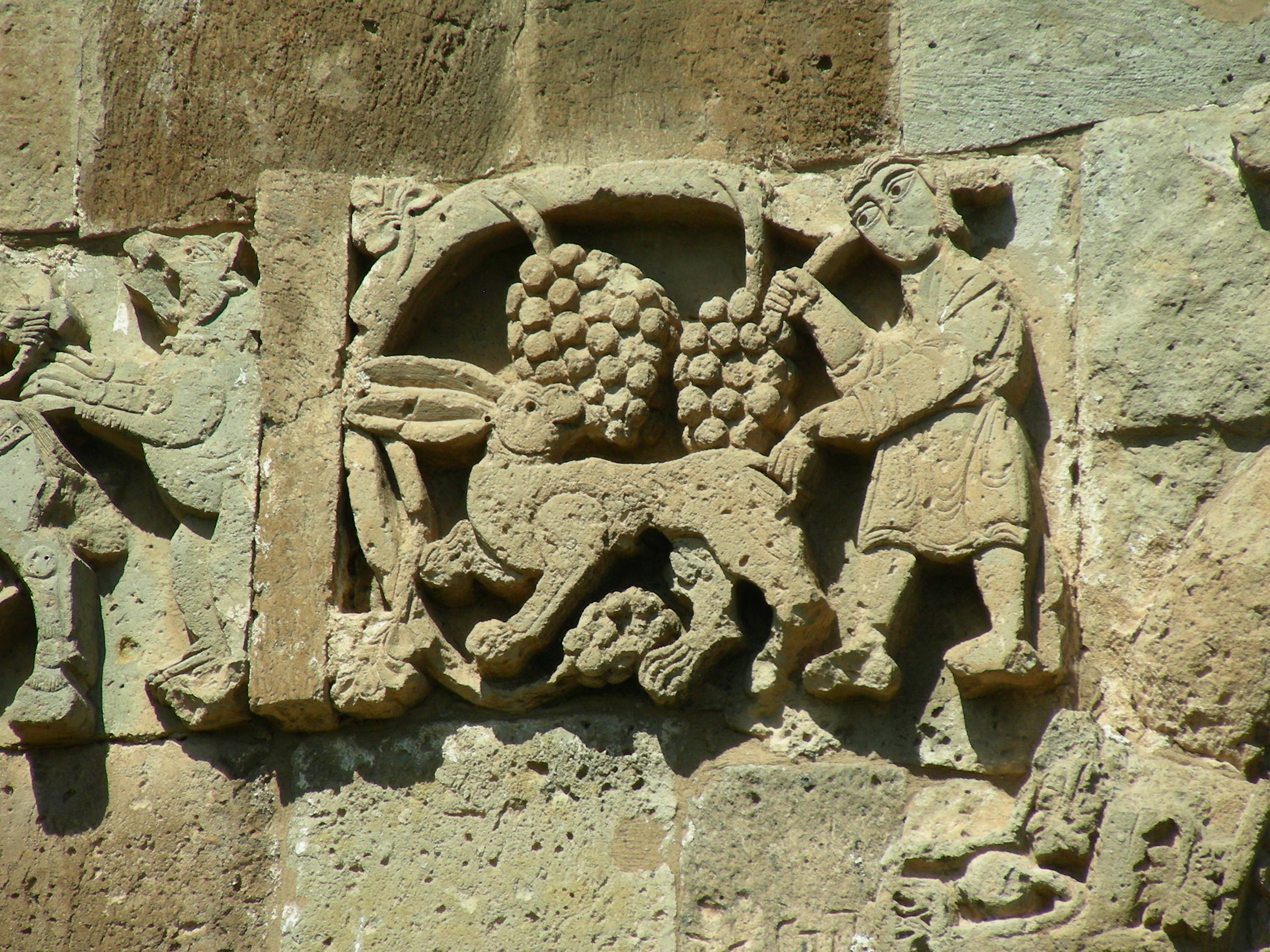

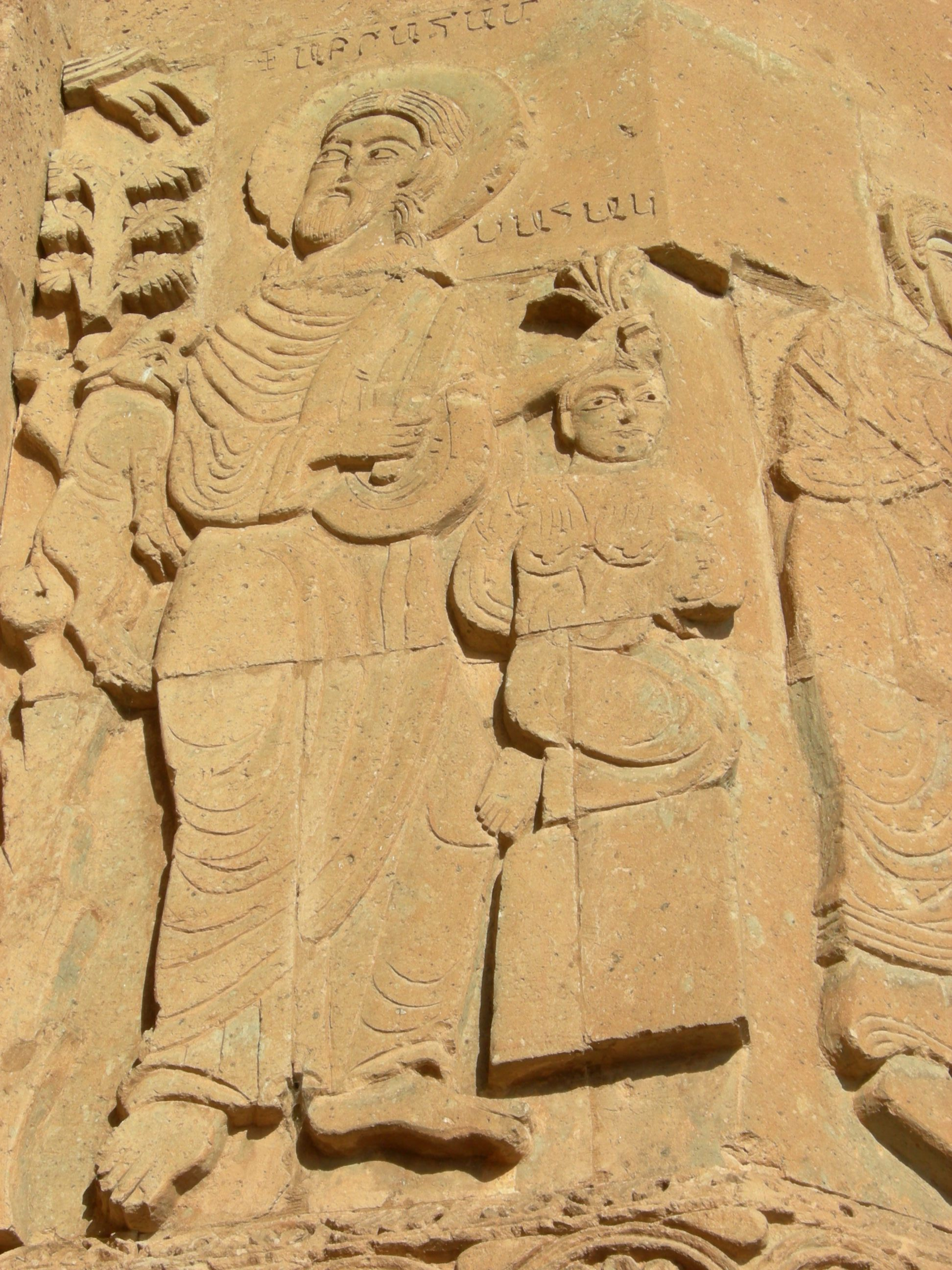

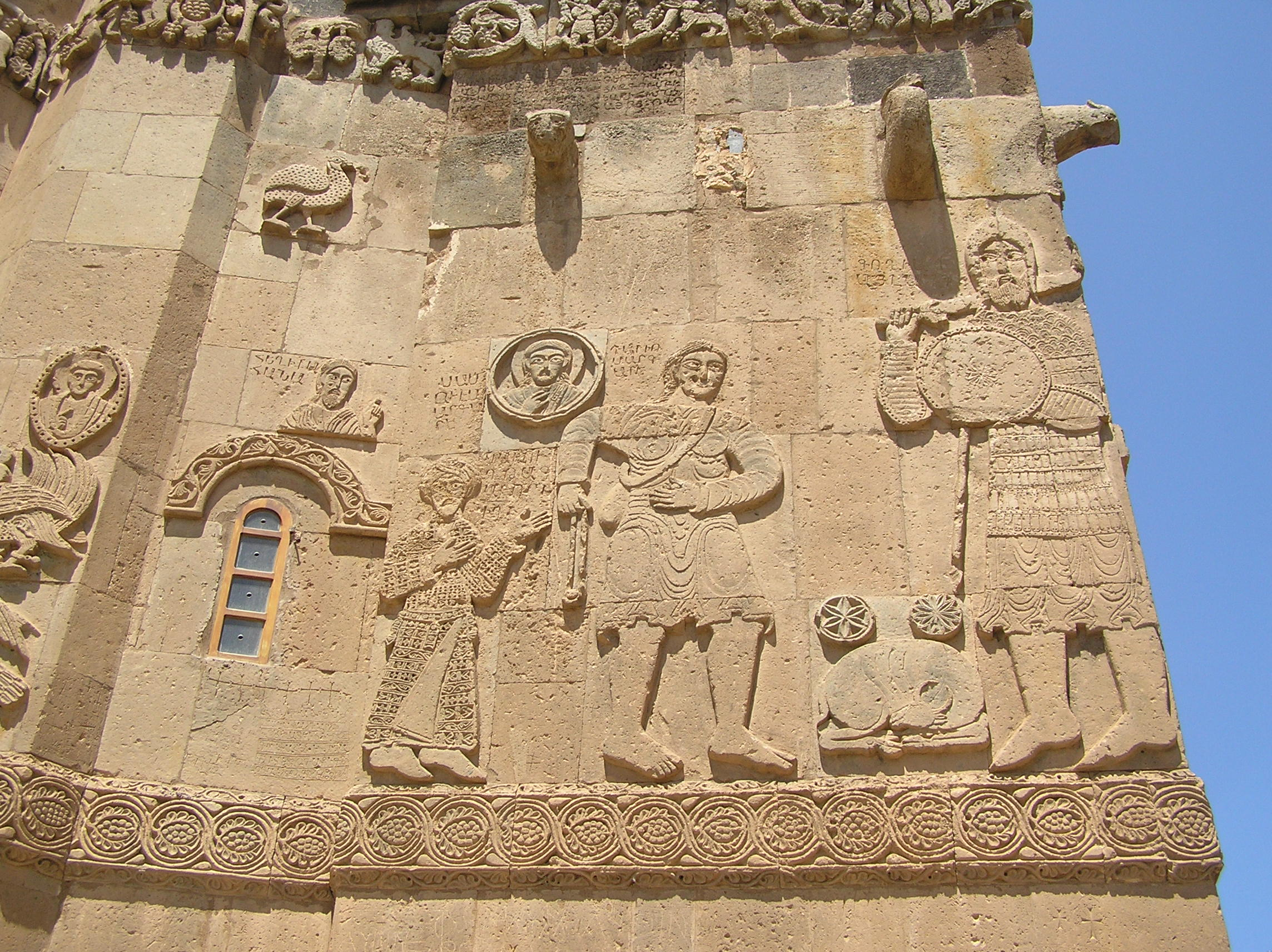

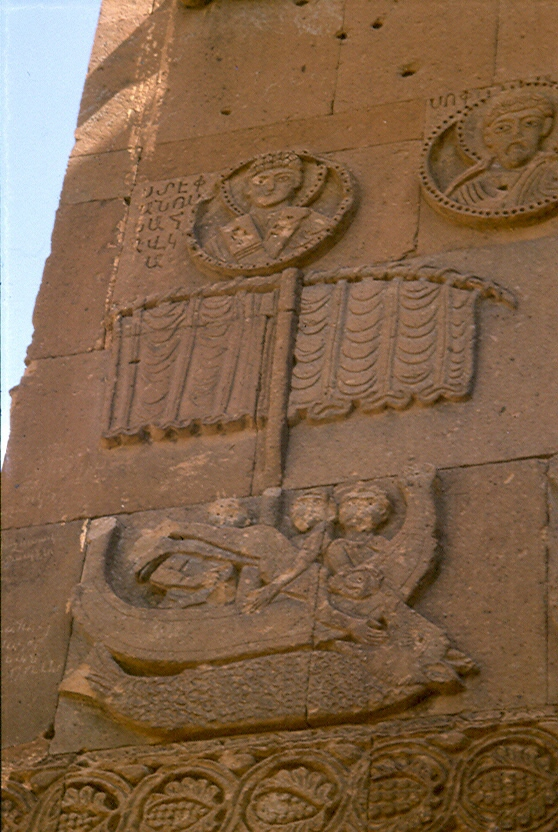

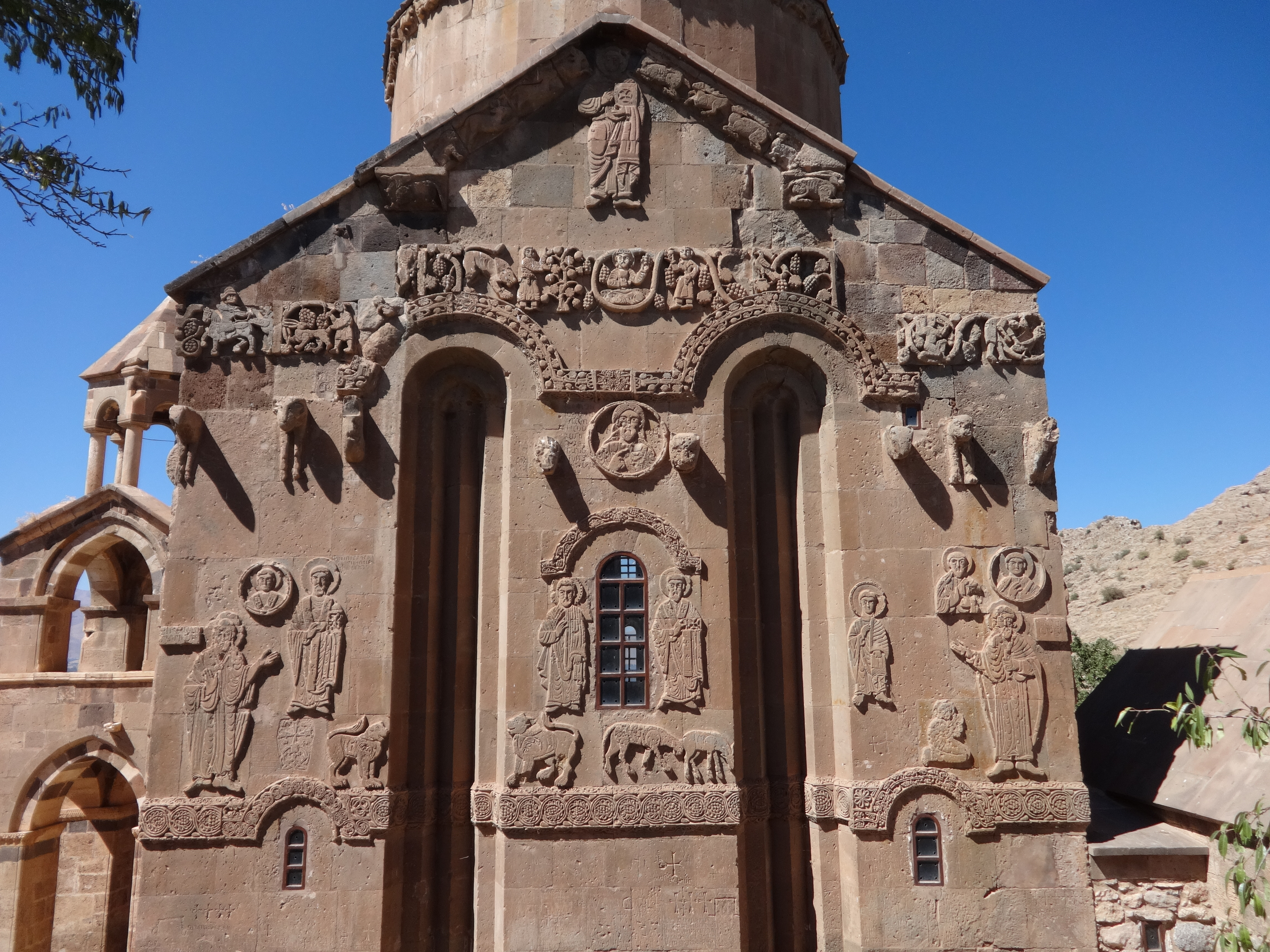

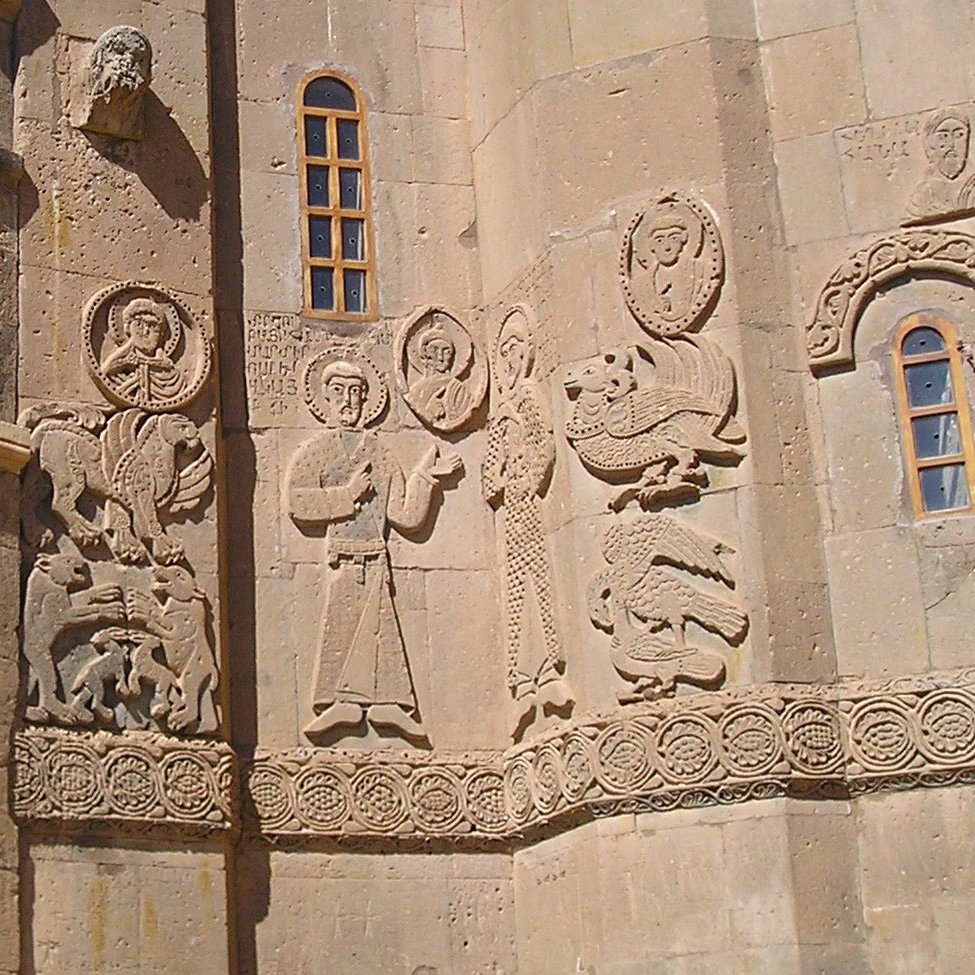

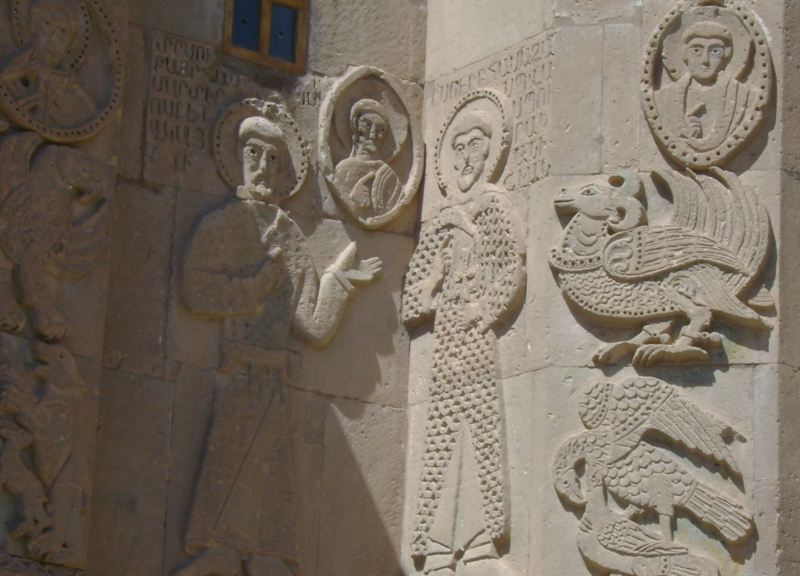

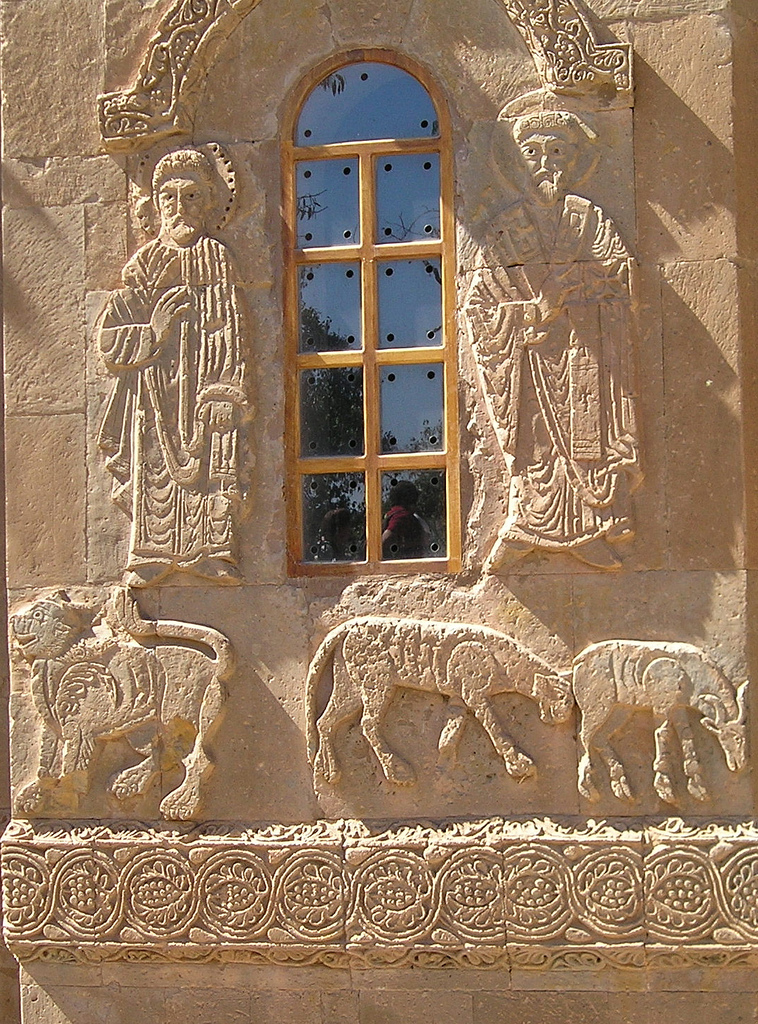

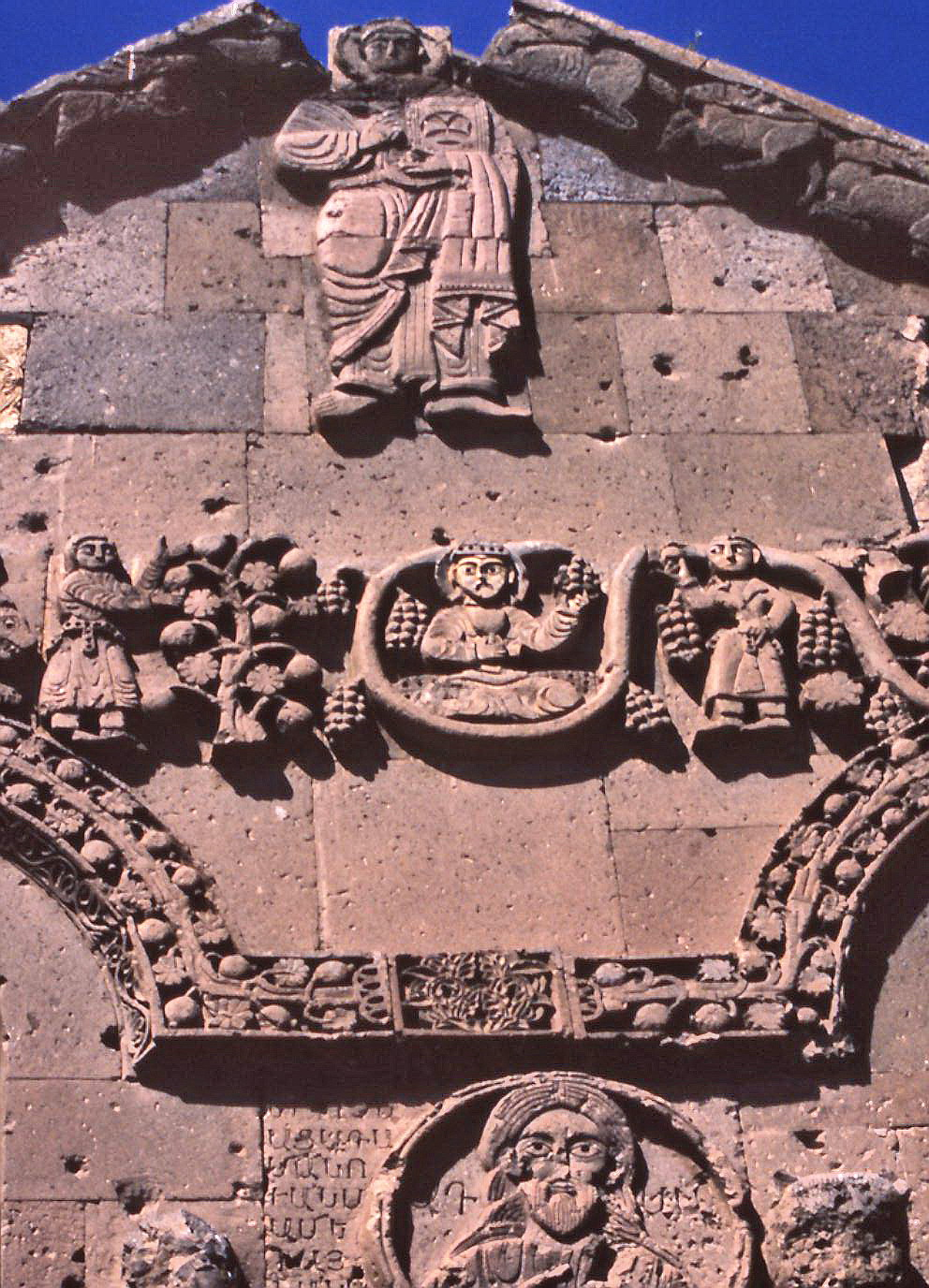

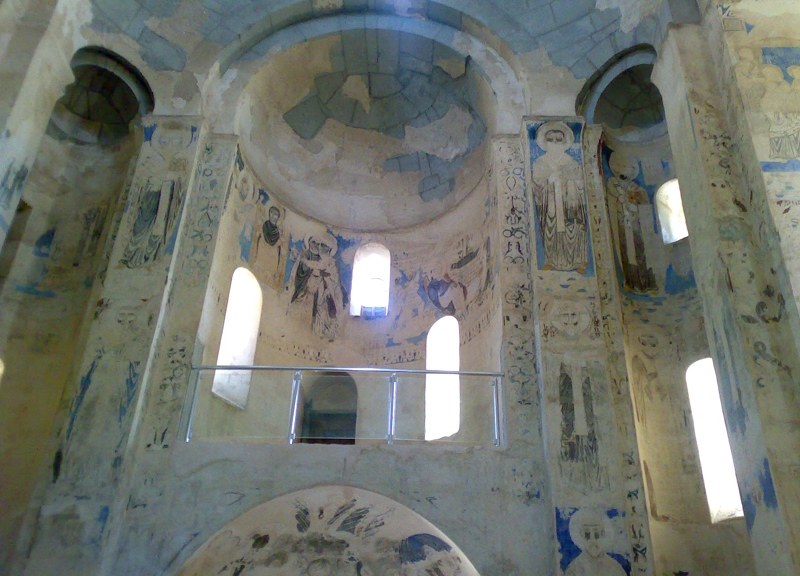

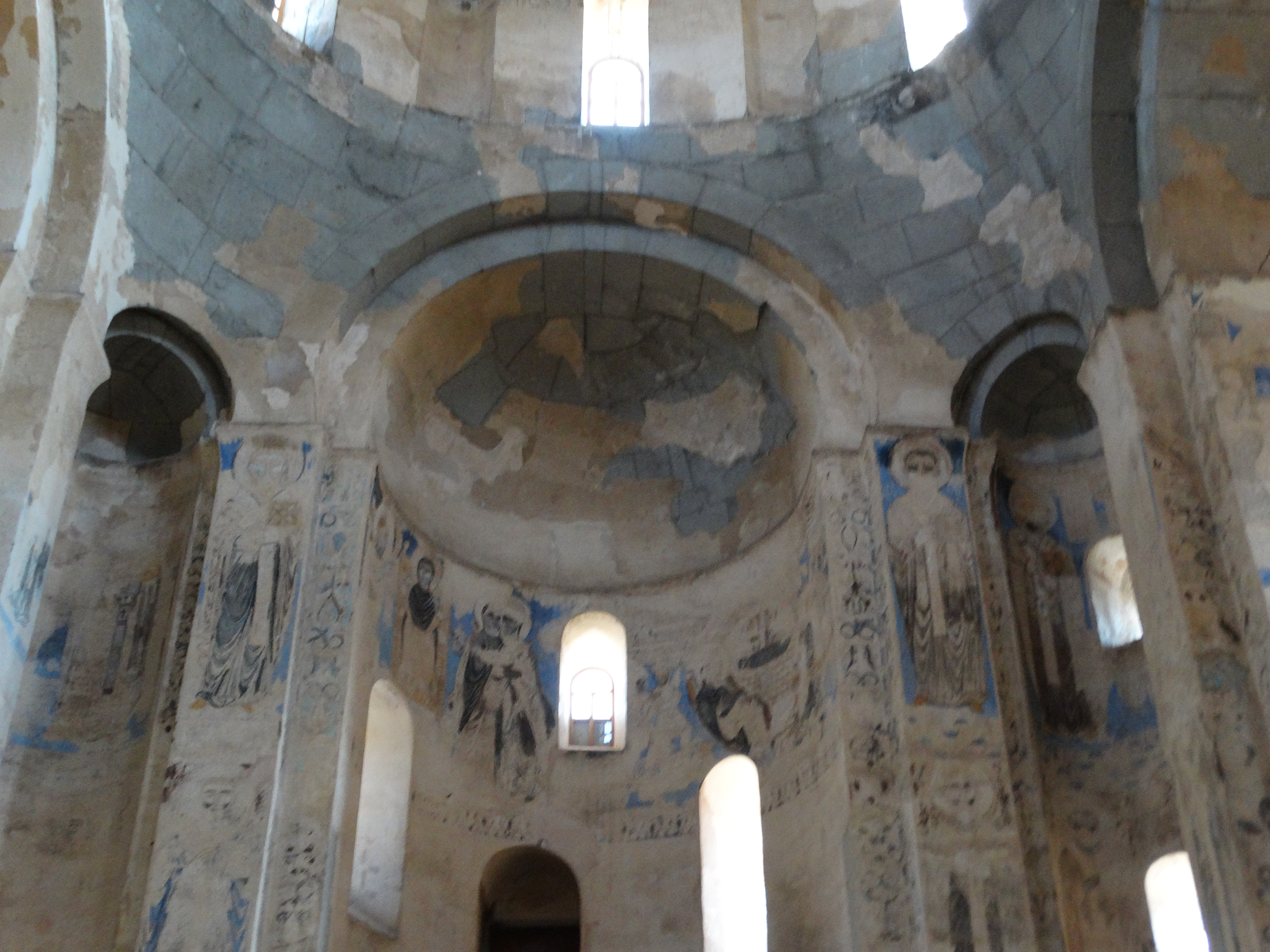

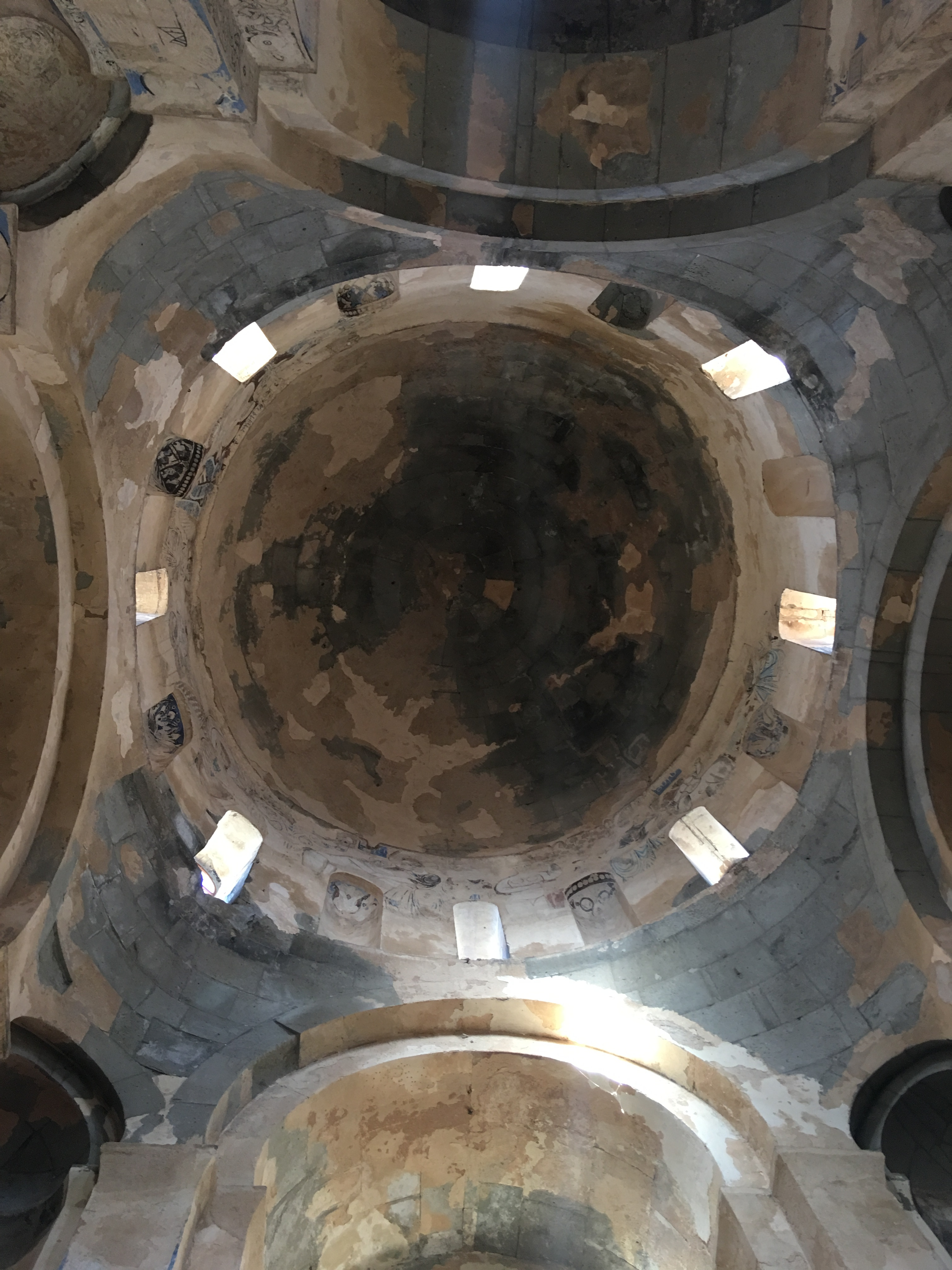

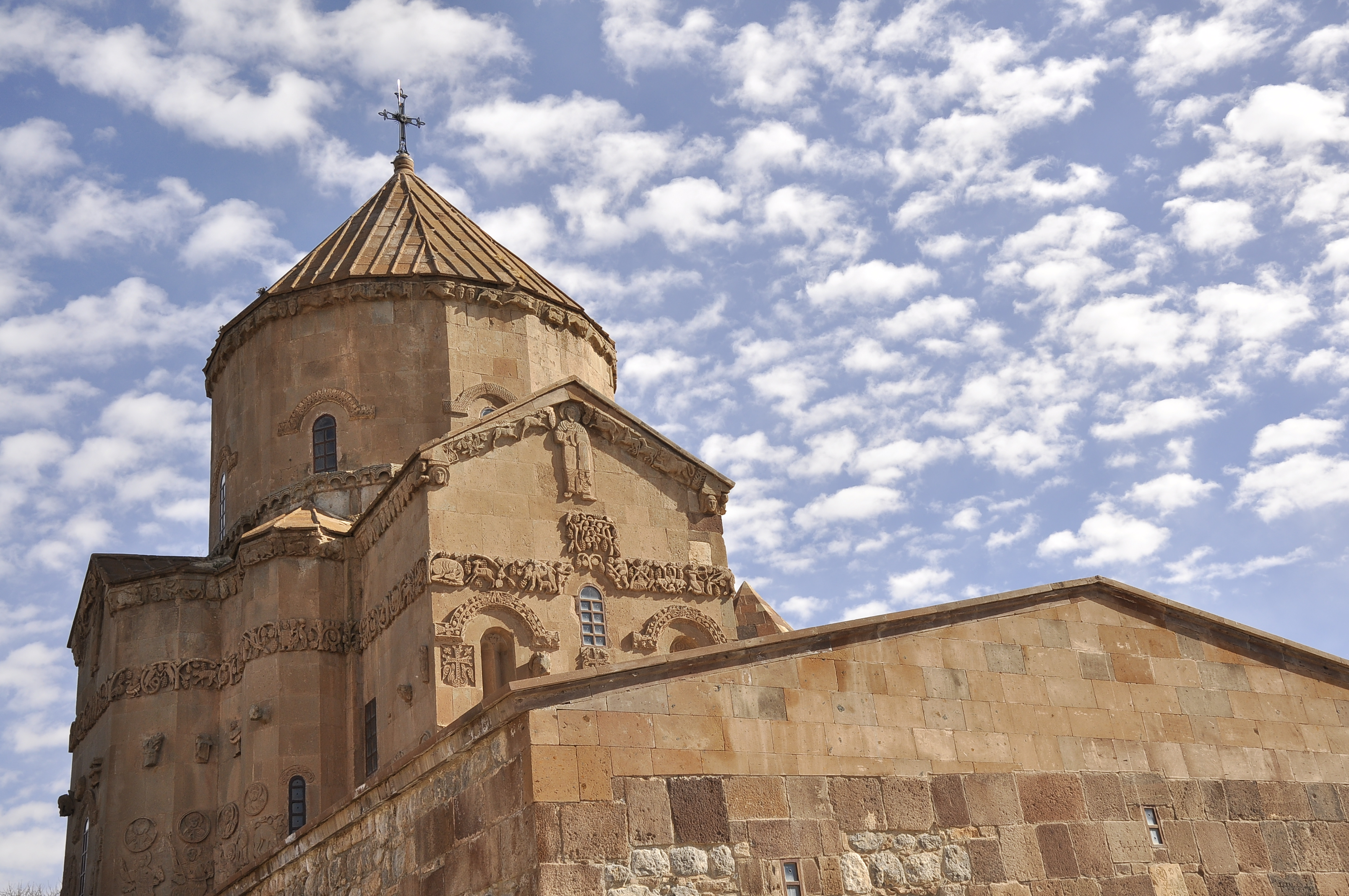

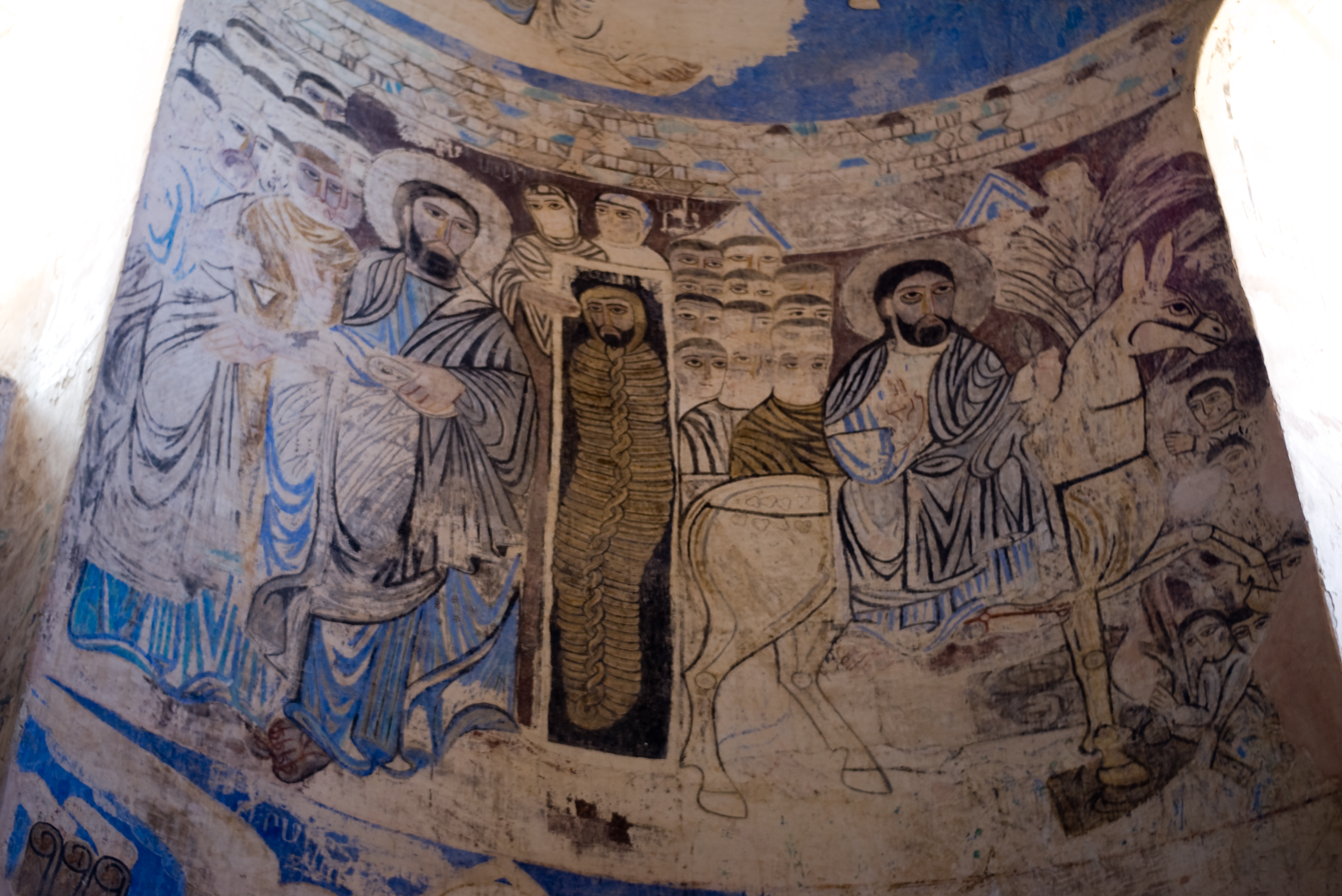

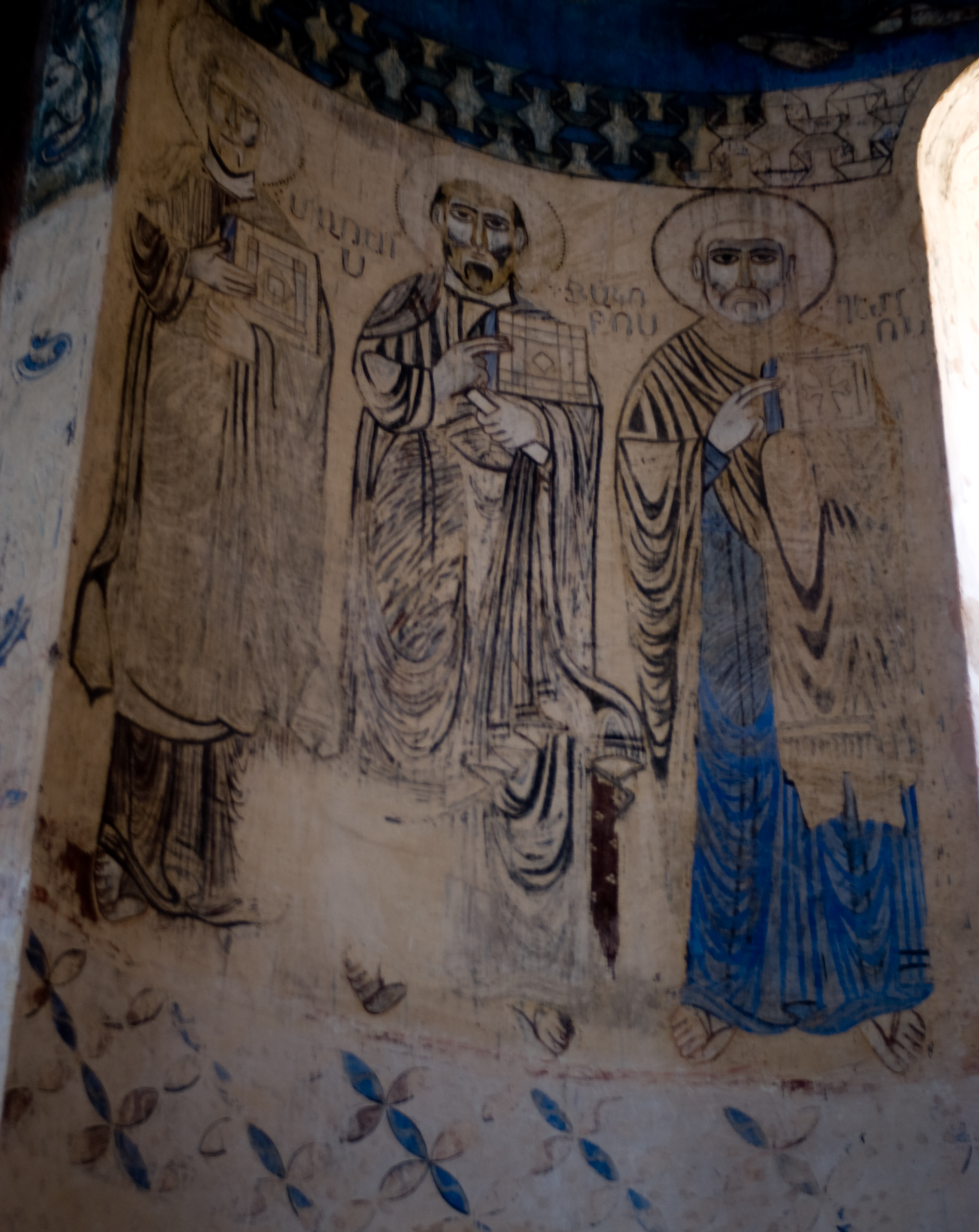

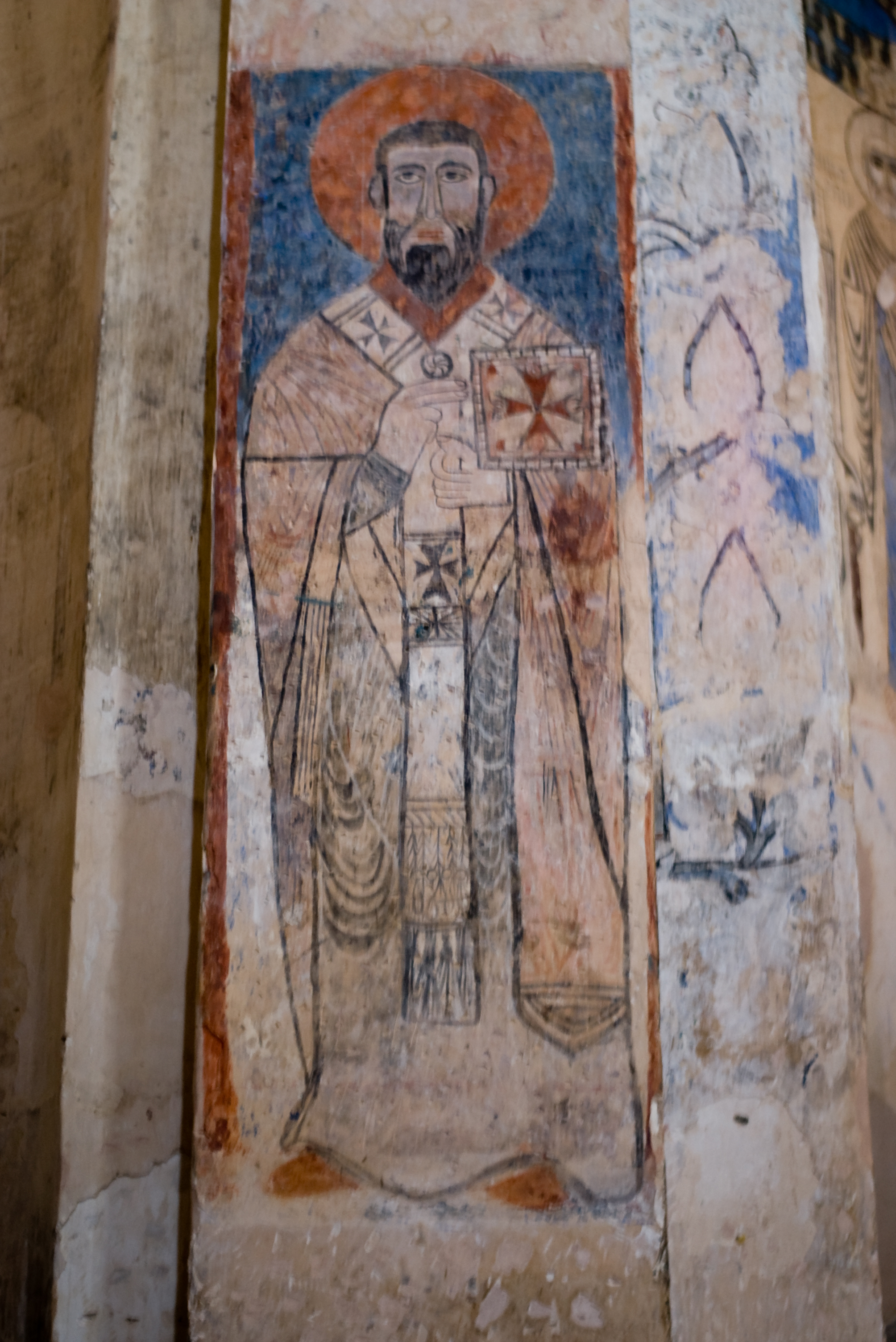

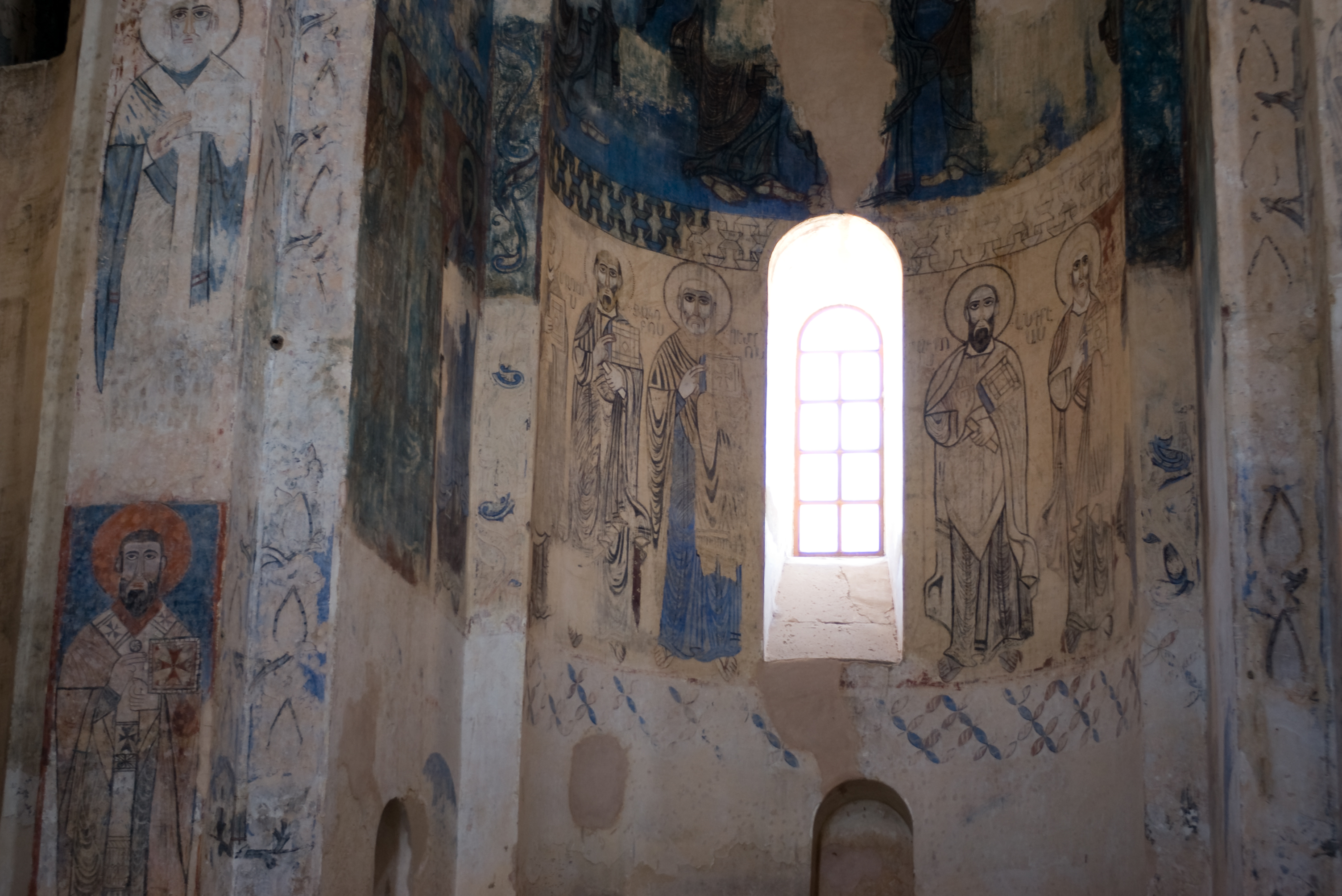

== See also ==
- Aghtamar Lake Van Monastery in Exile
