= Ashot-Sahak of Vaspurakan =

King of Vaspurakan (died 991)

Ashot-Sahak Աշոտ-Սահակ
- King of Vaspurakan
- Reign: 968/969–991
- Coronation: 968/969
- Predecessor: Abusahl-Hamazasp
- Successor: Gurgen-Khachik
- Died: 991
- House: Artsruni
- Father: Abusahl-Hamazasp

Ashot-Sahak Artsruni (died 991) was the fourth King of Vaspurakan, from the Artsruni dynasty. On the death of his father Abusahl-Hamazasp in 968/969, the kingdom was divided among his three sons, and Ashot, as the eldest, retained the royal title and the suzerainty over his younger brothers. On his death he was succeeded as king by his brother Gurgen-Khachik, who bypassed the rights of Ashot's sons.

Regnal titles
Preceded by Abusahl-Hamazasp	King of Vaspurakan; 968/969–991	Succeeded by Gurgen-Khachik
