= Gagik I Artsruni =

10th-century King of Vaspurakan

Gagik I Artsruni Գագիկ Ա Արծրունի
- King of Vaspurakan
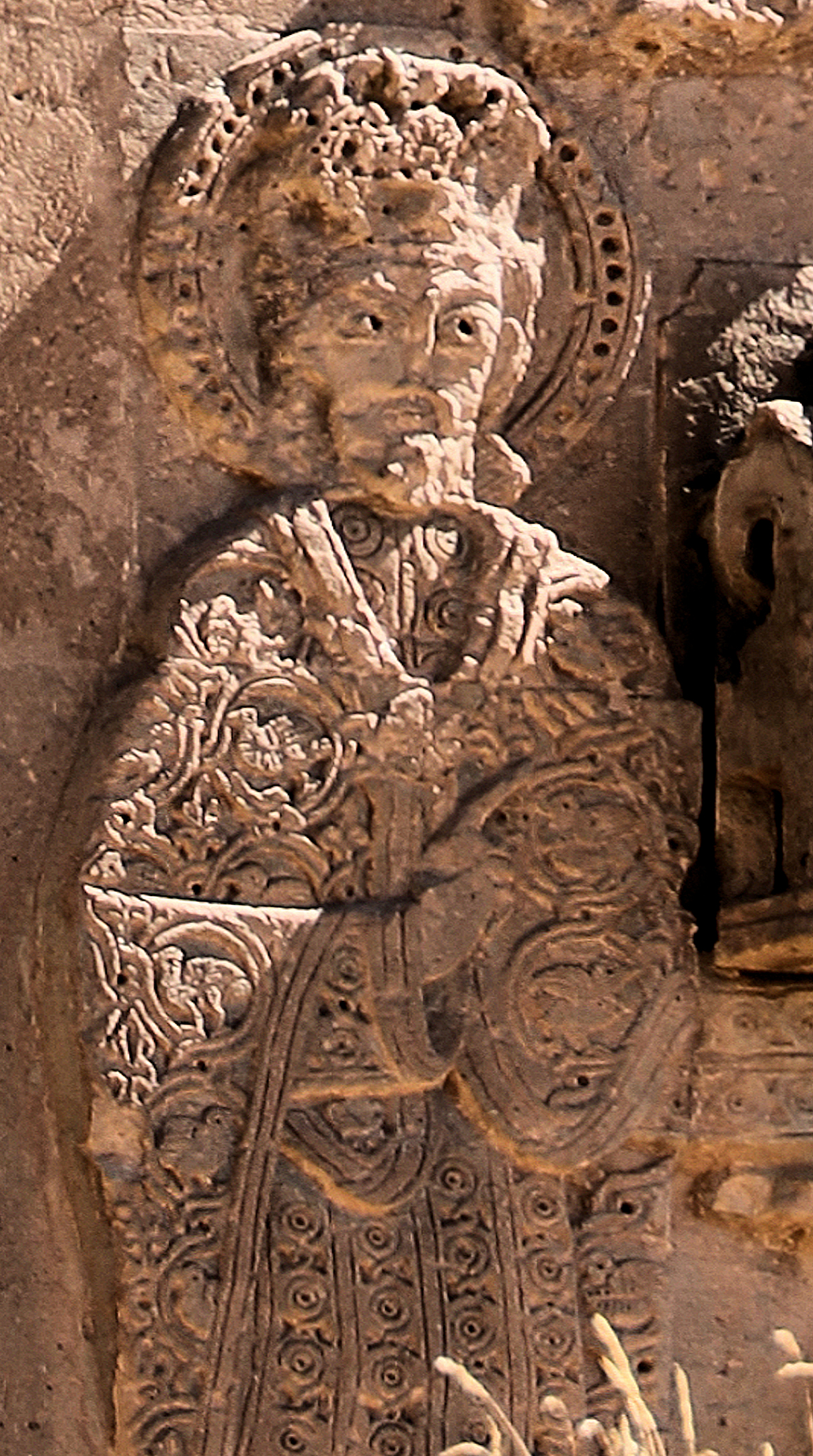
- Gagik I sculpture at the Church of the Holy Cross (915–921), Аghtamar.
- Reign: 904–937/943
- Investiture: 908
- Predecessor: Ashot-Sargis Artsruni
- Successor: Derenik-Ashot
- Born: 879/880
- Died: 943
- Consort: Grigoradukht (daughter of Grigor Abuhamza Artsruni); Mlke (granddaughter of Ashot I)
- Issue: Derenik-Ashot; Abusahl-Hamazasp; Khedenik
- Armenian: Գագիկ Ա Արծրունի
- House: Artsruni (partly)

Gagik I Artsruni (Armenian: Գագիկ Ա Արծրունի; 879/880 – 943) was an Armenian noble of the Artsruni dynasty who ruled over Vaspurakan in southern Armenia, first as prince of northwestern Vaspurakan (Gagik III, 904–908) and after that until his death as King of Vaspurakan, also claiming the title of King of Armenia.

He was married to Mlke, the daughter of Shapuh, the sparapet (commander-in-chief) and brother of King Smbat theUniversal. They had two children: Ashot-Derenik and Abusahl-Hamazasp.

Gagik-Khachik, the presiding prince of Vaspurakan (Gagik Artsruni), was born in 880 in Vaspurakan, into the family ofthe presiding prince Grigor-Derenik. He ruled from 904 and, in 908, founded the most powerful of the kingdoms underthe Bagratuni dynasty: the Kingdom of Vaspurakan.

== Activities ==
In 904, Gagik succeeded his middle brother, Ashot Artsruni. During his reign, Vaspurakan experienced unprecedented economic and political growth. Religious and defensive structures were built in the districts of Rshtunik, Tosb, and Chvash. He also continued the construction projects initiated by his father, Derenik, in the citadel of Van, the royal quarter, and the suburbs. To supply the princely capital of Van with water, Gagik constructed an aqueduct that brought water from the foothills of Mount Varag into the city. Gagik Artsruni also subjugated the Bagratunis ruling in Mokk, conquering the province and incorporating it into his domain. He recaptured the fortress of Amjuk from the Arab Uthmanid tribe. The fortress was situated on the elevated, rocky shore of Lake Van. The conquest of Moxoene and Gagik’s other undertakings weakened the position of the Bagratuni dynasty in southern Armenia, provoking the displeasure of Smbat I. Relations between Smbat I and Gagik Artsruni deteriorated when Smbat took the city and district of Nakhchavan from Vaspurakan and handed them over to the rulers of Syunik. These events contributed to Gagik Artsruni’s rapprochement with Yusuf, the emir of Atropatene.

In 908, Yusuf granted Gagik Artsruni a crown in the name of the caliph. According to Hovhannes Draskhanakerttsi, thistook place immediately after the dispute between Smbat I and Gagik over Nakhchavan, when the latter went to Yusuf.However, according to the account of the Anonymous Continuator of Tovma Artsruni, Gagik was crowned by Yusufafter King Smbat had been captured.

However, since Gagik Artsruni ruled only over his ancestral Vaspurakan, Mokk, and several districts of the provinces of Korchayk, Arzanene, Turuberan, and Ayrarat, other historians refer to him as the King of Vaspurakan. To become theKing of All Armenians, he would have needed to bring the other provinces of Armenia under his control as well. Yusuf also sought to conquer Ayrarat and the other parts of Armenia. With the support of Gagik and Gurgen Artsruni, as previously mentioned, he attacked Syunik in April 909. The attack was repeated in the spring of 910 by the military forcesof Vaspurakan. The latter besieged Vagharshakert (Alashkert) but failed to capture it. Gagik Artsruni also failed to take Nakhchavan, as it had already been occupied by Yusuf. Yusuf also supported Ashot Bagratuni, who had joined him in 909. Ashot was the son of Shapuh, the brother of Smbat I, and, as a member of the Bagratuni dynasty, was also a claimantto the throne and a rival of Gagik. Yusuf favored Ashot over Gagik because he did not trust the King of Vaspurakan. Having witnessed the atrocities committed by Yusuf’s troops, Gagik Artsruni decided to sever his ties with him. To thisend, in 912, he appealed to King Smbat I, wishing to ally himself with him. The atrocities committed by Yusuf’s forces in Armenia also brought the rulers of the Artsruni and Syuni dynasties closer together in opposition to their cruel enemy. Prince Smbat of Syunik, fleeing from the enemy, sought refuge in Vaspurakan.

During the reign of Gagik Artsruni (908–943), the Kingdom of Vaspurakan experience daperiod of remarkable prosperity. Crafts, trade, and agriculture developed. The Kingdom of Vaspurakan possessed considerable power and an influential position not only in Armenia but also in neighboring countries. Constantine VII Porphyrogenitus referred to Gagik Artsruni by the title “Prince of Princes,” whereas he called King Ashot Bagratuni merely “Magistros.” Catholicos Anania I of Mokk, when mentioning Gagik Artsruni and Ashot Bagratuni as sovereign kings of Armenia, placed the King of Vaspurakan first. During Gagik Artsruni’s reign, the Kingdom of Vaspurakan successfully resisted attacks by neighboring emirates. Khachik-Gagik Artsruni became renowned as a great builder.The anonymous author of the History of theHouse of Artsruni testifies that the sovereign possessed artistic taste and devoted himself who leheartedly to creative work. The Armenian historian describes Gagik’s most remarkable architectural achievements with admiration. The anonymous author praises two additional structures commissioned by Khachik-Gagik on Aghtamar Island: the royal palace and the Church of the Holy Cross.

The church was built between 915 and 921 by the architect Manuel. In 1113, it became the center of the Catholicosate of Aghtamar of the Armenian Apostolic Holy Church. This was accomplished with the unanimous consent of five bishops and the young patriarch Gregory III Pahlavuni.

In 1114, Bishop David was sent from the Church of Shugra in Cilicia to the ChurchofAghtamar. However, he refused to submit to the decision of the higher authorities and established the Catholicosate of Aghtamar.The jurisdiction of the Catholicosate extended over only part of Vaspurakan.

During the period of Mongol rule, the Catholicoi of Aghtamar were elected from the Artsruni dynasty. From that time onward, the title became hereditary. With the support of Jahan Shah of the Kara Koyunlu, Catholicos Zakaria III managed tounite the Catholicosates of Aghtamar and Etchmiadzin for a period of time. In theeighteenth century, following a prolonged dispute over the limits of the jurisdiction of the two Catholicosates, the Catholicosate of Etchmiadzin was recognizedas the principal one. By the nineteenth century, the Catholicosate of Aghtamar had two dioceses, comprising 302 churches and 58 monasteries. In 1895, thediocesescame under the jurisdiction of the Armenian Patriarchate. The monasticcomplexwas abandoned during the Armenian Genocide of 1915.

The Church of the Holy Cross, taken as a whole, remained a unique achievement in medieval Armenian art. The sculptural reliefs of Aghtamar influenced both the subsequent development of Armenian sculpture, including the monuments of Bgheno-Noravank, and Sanahin, and the formation of the Vaspurakan school of miniature painting in the thirteenth and fourteenth centuries.

== Kingdom of Vaspurakan ==
After the death of Sargis-Ashot in 904, the principality of Vaspurakan passed to their middle brother, Gagik. He was 25 years old when he assumed the governance of his province, but he had repeatedly distinguished himself with his brilliant military and diplomatic abilities. The two brothers, Gagik and Gurgen, divided Vaspurakan between themselves. The younger brother, Gurgen, received southeastern Vaspurakan, while Gagik received the northwestern section. At that time, Vaspurakan was conducting a series of small wars that brought them success; however, these small tribes gathered in the Zarevand (Salmast) province and prepared to march upon Vaspurakan. Realizing that it would be difficult to withstand these forces, Gagik immediately began negotiating with the leaders of those tribes and, by fulfilling their demands, concluded peace with them.

Gagik begins addressing his internal issues. He attempts to eliminate anarchy and, for that reason, suppresses a number of princes pursuing separatist policies. One of these small wars played an especially important role in the history of Vaspurakan. Gagik organizes operations against the Amyuk fortress, through which, as Tovma Artsruni relates, Gagik "steals" the fortress. This demonstrates that to capture this impregnable fortress, Gagik resorted to certain ruses and captured it quickly, without large military forces. The fortress belonged to the Utmanik Arab tribe.

No matter how much Tovma Artsruni tries in his book to show that after the capture of Amyuk, Vaspurakan's relations with Atropatene took on a negative tone, it is clear that relations between Atropatene and Vaspurakan remained at a high level even after that. For that reason, Smbat tries in every way to influence Gagik and hold him back from these treasonous actions, but without success. To teach Vaspurakan a lesson, he defends the rights of the Utmaniks and recaptures the Amyuk fortress. According to Tovma Artsruni, after capturing it, he sells the fortress back to Gagik again, but the meaning of this move remains unrevealed to this day.

The massacre of the Arab population of Amyuk fortress causes revenge among the Muslims. They assemble again in the Salmast province to wage a religious war against Gagik. When the Muslims invade the Mardastan province of Vaspurakan, the brave Thaddeus Akeatsi marches against them and drives them back. Realizing that they cannot overrule the state led by Gagik, they depart.

Soon, a territorial dispute arises between the Artsrunis and the Syunis. The subject of the dispute was the city of Nakhchavan, which had been returned to Smbat Syuni, while Gagik wanted to receive it back. Smbat responds to him, saying that Nakhchavan was given to the Syunis with his consent and deed. This becomes the occasion for a massive interethnic war. Gagik appeals to Yusuf, who sends him a crown in 908 and recognizes him as the "King of All Armenians." Both Gagik and Smbat understood why Yusuf took this step: to sow discord among the Armenian nakharars (nobles). However, Gagik could not reunite all of Armenia because the Bagratid Kingdom was still standing, and destroying it required immense military force (by prioritizing personal princely interests and the drive to preserve Vaspurakan's independence, Artsruni effectively contributed to the weakening of Bagratid authority; nevertheless, one must also account for the political situation at the beginning of the 10th century, where rivalry among noble houses and foreign interference forced princes to make decisions that were not always straightforward). For that reason, Yusuf and Gagik join forces and launch their struggle against Smbat. Realizing that the alliance between Vaspurakan and Atropatene could prove catastrophic for Armenia, Smbat sends a delegation bearing grand gifts to Yusuf, led by Catholicos Hovhannes Draskhanakerttsi. He entreats Yusuf to step back from his decision to invade Armenia, but Yusuf remained adamant. He arrests Catholicos Hovhannes, thereby demonstrating his response to Smbat. In order for Yusuf to prepare quickly for the campaign, Gagik sends his brother, Marzpan Gurgen, to Yusuf, and then goes to meet him himself. Catholicos Hovhannes believed that Gagik would intercede to secure his release—since he was, after all, a fellow Christian—but that did not happen.

In 909, Yusuf takes command of a massive army and marches on Armenia. At the Armenian border, Gagik, his brother Gurgen, and other Vaspurakan princes join him along with their troops. Instead of leading his army toward Dvin as usual, Yusuf moves north and enters Syunik, as Gagik was embroiled in territorial disputes with it. Smbat is unable to secure a victory in this mountain warfare, and ultimately the entire Syuni dynasty flees, each escaping to a different corner of the country.

Yusuf advances toward Dvin, taking Catholicos Hovhannes along with him. Grigor Supan, one of the princes of Syunik, resorts to the desperate measure of surrendering to Yusuf in the hope that his family would be saved. Yusuf assesses the situation correctly and receives the prince with favor. Grigor Supan's example proved contagious, and a number of Syuni princes went to Yusuf and surrendered.

The unity of the Armenian nakharars (nobles) collapses. At that time, Yusuf announces that he will depart from Armenia if Smbat sends him one year's worth of taxes. Believing Yusuf, Smbat sends him sixty thousand gold pieces. After receiving the gold, Yusuf left Dvin and began a campaign against Smbat. Smbat manages to evade him and reach the village of Odzun, from where he passes into Tayk and fortifies himself there; however, Yusuf continues to pursue Smbat. Historians liken these pursuits to a hunt, but Yusuf's hunt does not end successfully, as he manages to capture only Tiflis, and due to the impending winter, he is forced to return to Dvin. After Yusuf's return, Smbat also returns to Erazgavors, where he learns that his brother Shapuh's son, Ashot, who was the sparapet (commander-in-chief), had also gone and surrendered to Yusuf. This was a very heavy blow for Smbat. According to various accounts, Yusuf released Catholicos Hovhannes due to Sparapet Ashot's surrender.

In the spring of 910, Yusuf forms an army from the Armenian forces, but this time he does not lead it personally; instead, he assigns the command to Gagik, Gurgen, and other Artsruni princes. The purpose of this was to incite an interethnic war. Smbat exerts his final forces and assembles an army, entrusting its leadership to his two sons, Ashot and Mushegh. The King of Armenia instructs them to conduct only a defensive war. However, in the battle that took place at the site called Dzknavachar, the two young princes go on the offensive and even cause panic in the Persian army. Hope arises that the Armenians will celebrate victory, but treason occurs on the wing of the army where Ashot was fighting. The army of the Utis called Sevordis betrays them, causing Ashot to flee.

After the defeat at Dzknavachar, looting began across all of Armenia, and those princes who had surrendered or been captured during the battles were killed. Among those princes were Grigor Supan Syuni, Prince Mushegh, and Smbat, the son of the king's brother Sahak. At that time, Gagik and Gurgen realized the mistake they had made; they understood that their lives were also in danger and lay in Yusuf's hands. For that reason, they began to serve even more submissively and obediently, executing Yusuf's orders. Smbat sends a delegation to Baghdad, entreating the Caliph to take measures to curb Yusuf, but the Caliphate was occupied with a powerful uprising that had erupted in Egypt. Smbat also turns to the Byzantine Emperor Leo the Wise, who promises to aid Smbat, but, unfortunately, passes away that very year, while the next emperor was an indifferent man who did not intervene in Armenia's affairs. At that point, Smbat realizes that he must resist with his small forces and departs for Erazkhadzor. Yusuf goes and besieges the Vagharshakert (now Alashkert) fortress, which blocked the entrance to the Erazkhadzor province from the west. Great massacres occur among the Armenians. Likely moved by these scenes, Gagik realizes that he has committed a grave error and decides to repent once more and reunite with his uncle, Smbat. Smbat forgives him and agrees to join forces, but it was already too late.

Yusuf intensifies the pressure, and Smbat shuts himself inside the impregnable Kapuyt fortress. For around one year, Smbat resists, but negotiations begin, as a result of which Yusuf promises not to harm Smbat if he surrenders. Smbat surrenders, while Gagik manages to flee from the army. He departs for the fortresses of Kordvats. Learning of all this, Yusuf unleashes all his rage upon Smbat, takes him in chains to Dvin, and subjects the Armenian king to inhumane torture. He is brought before the Yernjak fortress so that the defenders, seeing their king's torture, would take pity on him and surrender, but that does not happen. Ultimately, in 914, Yusuf grows tired of torturing Smbat and beheads him, sending his body to Dvin, where it is crucified on the city wall.

The Return of Nakhchavan to the Saunas

The Artsrunis wished to annex the province of Mokk to Vaspurakan as well. At this time, Gurgen, the lord of Andzevatsik, was at war against Prince Mushegh of Mokk, whom he defeats and kills in battle, but Mokk remains standing. Meanwhile, Taron, Sason, and Arzanene are conquered by the Emir of Mesopotamia, Ahmad Shaybani, who was also making encroachments against Vaspurakan. He arrested Aplmakhr, the emir of Arzni, who had become a son-in-law to the Artsrunis and professed Christianity. In 896, Afshin, the emir of Atropatene, allied with Smbat I, marched on Vaspurakan with the intention of settling scores with Ashot Artsruni. Afshin spreads raids across Vaspurakan and, taking possession of Van, stations the Artsruni brothers at the approaches to the Jdmar and Sring fortresses; the regions conquered from Persarmenia are detached from Vaspurakan.

Of key importance for the history of Vaspurakan was the issue of the city of Nakhchavan and its adjacent province. During the period of the establishment of the Bagratid Kingdom, this ancient Armenian city naturally became part of it. Nakhchavan was a vital nexus that strengthened Vaspurakan's political ties with Ayrarat and Syunik. Based on the experience of Armenian history, the Bagratid kings were well aware that Nakhchavan could serve as a foothold for Atropatene against Armenia. At an opportune moment, the emir of Atropatene could sever the Armenian forces via Nakhchavan–Goghtn–Dvin. Conversely, if the city were part of Vaspurakan, the rulers of Atropatene, when attempting encroachments against Armenia, would first have to clash with the Artsrunis. In 902, King Smbat I bestows Nakhchavan upon his cousin, Ashot Artsruni, the presiding prince of Vaspurakan, for the support he rendered in the victory over the Kaysiks under Manazkert; true, this city is still mentioned as part of Vaspurakan in the Ashkharhatsuyts, but at the beginning of the 8th century, when the overwhelming dominance of the Armenian nakharars—including the Artsrunis!—was destroyed by the Arabs, the city was wrested from the weakened Artsrunis and placed under the suzerainty of an Arab emir. Since Nakhchavan was given to Ashot Artsruni (in 902) in exchange for his services, it became his conditional rather than hereditary, inalienable property (though Tovma Artsruni is inclined to consider it hereditary); therefore, after his death in 904, the King of Armenia wrested Nakhchavan from Vaspurakan and, after some time, placed it under the jurisdiction of the lords of Syunik. This is evident from the following fact: when, after Ashot Artsruni's death in 904, his brothers Gagik and Gurgen divide Vaspurakan between themselves, Nakhchavan is not mentioned in either of their shares. However, for Syunik, the economic role of that city was even greater, since cities were almost entirely absent there. Nakhchavan was given to Syunik by the Armenian king in all probability in 908, when the rapprochement between Yusuf and Gagik Artsruni became unequivocally clear to Smbat I.

Territory and Economic Upswing

The Artsruni Kingdom of Vaspurakan was a feudal state in medieval Armenia from 908 to 1021, led by the Artsruni royal dynasty. Subject to vassalage under the medieval Bagratids, this kingdom included territories within present-day Turkey, partly Armenia, Iran, and the Nakhchivan Autonomous Republic (Azerbaijan).

Among the subordinate kingdoms (Vaspurakan, Syunik, Vanand, Lori) and principalities (Taron, Tayk) of Bagratid Armenia, it was the most extensive and most powerful, established in 908 by Gagik Artsruni and proclaimed a kingdom with the assistance of the Emirate of Atropatene.

The territory of the kingdom encompassed the regions lying between Lakes Van and Kaputan (Urmia), spanning 40,000 square kilometers. Its population at the beginning of the 11th century reached nearly one million. During the same period, there were more than 8 cities, 4,000 villages, 72 fortresses and castles, and 115 monasteries and churches in Vaspurakan.

Under Gagik Artsruni and his successors, the Kingdom of Vaspurakan experienced a great economic and cultural upswing, with extensive construction unfolding throughout all of Vaspurakan. Akhtamar Island was artificially enlarged, where the king built the Cathedral of Holy Cross at Akhtamar, a harbor, and royal palaces. Vaspurakan is characterized by mountainous plateaus and elevated valleys squeezed between mountains, through which small rivers flow to bring life to them. The climate of the coastal valleys of Lake Van is mild and favorable for agriculture, particularly for growing fruit orchards and vineyards. Mountain pastures provided opportunities for the development of animal husbandry. The history of the Kingdom of Vaspurakan is compiled in the works of several Armenian historians, among which the chronicle History of the House of Artsruni by Tovma Artsruni is of particularly great value.

Akhtamar

The name of the island originated from the name of Tamar, the heroine of an ancient Armenian legend. Based on that legend, the renowned Armenian writer Hovhannes Tumanyan wrote his poem "Akhtamar." In ancient times, Akhtamar Island was called Aiyidus. The island has been inhabited since ancient times. In the northwestern corner of the island, traces of Cyclopean defensive walls (two to three rows) have been preserved, which, according to Orbeli, are remnants of a pre-Urartian settlement. According to the testimony of Movses Khorenatsi, there was a fortress of the Rshtuni nakharars on Akhtamar in the 4th century. In the middle of the 7th century, in the struggle against the Arabs, Akhtamar served as a stronghold for Theodore Rshtuni. At the beginning of the 10th century, King Gagik Artsruni initiated extensive construction on Akhtamar, turning it into an impregnable fortress-city—the political and spiritual center of the Artsruni Kingdom of Vaspurakan. The historian Tovma Artsruni reports that by royal command, by filling the lake in the southern part of the island with "heavy and difficult-to-transport" rock boulders, they created a dam about five cubits (2.6 m) high. Upon it rose the wall, featuring broad eight buttresses and numerous towers. The great wall was five asparezes (racetracks) in length (554 m). Inside the towers were "alcove-like thrones for recreation." At one end of the fortress, adjacent to the massive walls, large storehouses, granaries, armories, and other auxiliary buildings were constructed. With the construction of the dam, a section of the lake was artificially separated as a bay, thereby creating, according to the historian, "a peaceful and secure harbor constructed for many ships..." The wall and the harbor are currently submerged underwater. In parallel, the construction of other parts of the island's architectural complex was carried out, creating a defined network of streets leading to city squares, gardens, and orchards. According to the layout composition, royal and princely palaces, recreation areas, streets, and avenues were built in the elevated part of the island, which were again enclosed by walls to form the citadel. The crowning achievements of the construction were two monument-monoliths: the palace of Gagik Artsruni and the Holy Cross Church, the construction of which was entrusted to the brilliant architect, sculptor, and painter Manuel.

The thousand-year-old temple has reached us without significant alterations. In the 14th century, the roofs of the eastern annexes (vestries) were raised, and the dome's cowl was reconstructed, replacing the former spherical cover with a conical one. In 1293, a small chapel was built on the northeastern side of the temple, and in 1763, a large, low-slung gavit (narthex) was added to the western side. In the 18th century, the stairs leading to the royal upper gallery were demolished, and a tall bell tower was added in front of the southern entrance. On the north eastern side of the temple lies a large cemetery containing numerous khachkars (cross-stones) dating from the 13th to 17th centuries. After the fall of the Kingdom of Vaspurakan, the Artsruni princes and their descendants resided at Akhtamar. Subsequently, it is no longer mentioned as a city, but it remained an episcopal and catholicosal center (Catholicosate of Akhtamar).

== Family ==
Below are three of the seven children of King Ashot I the Great and Queen Katranide I, along with their families. The other four—Smbat, Sahak, Davit, and Mariam—are not included.

Ashot the Great; Prince of Princes, sparapet (855–885) king of Armenia (885–890)	Katranide I Queen of Armenia (885–890)
Smbat king of Armenia (890–914)	Sahak	David (†902)	Shapuh sparapet (†912)
Sofya	Grigor-Derenik prince of Vaspurakan (857–887)	daughter	Vahan Artsruni	Mariam (†914)	Vasak Syuni prince of Syunik (855–859)
Ashot prince of Vaspurakan (898–904)	Gagik prince and king of Vaspurakan (904–908) / (908–943)	Gurgen prince of Parskahayk (904–925)	Grigor prince of Syunik (855–859) (859–913)	Sahak	Vasak
Ashot the Iron king of Armenia (914–928)	Sahakanuysh Sevada	Abas king of Armenia (928–953)	Gurgendukht Bagratuni	Seda	son	Ashot

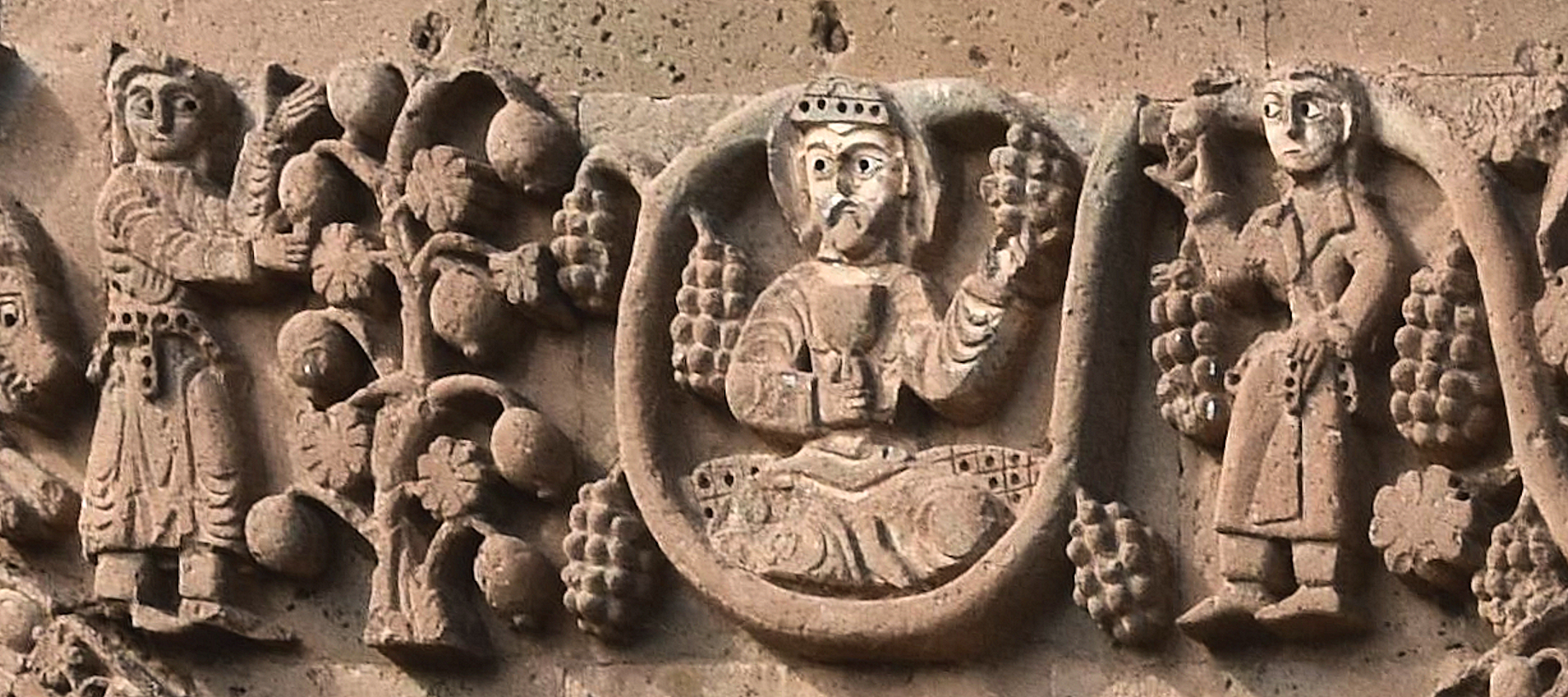
Ruler with attendants, Cathedral of the Holy Cross, Aghtamar (915–921). Assumed depiction of Gagik with his two sons.

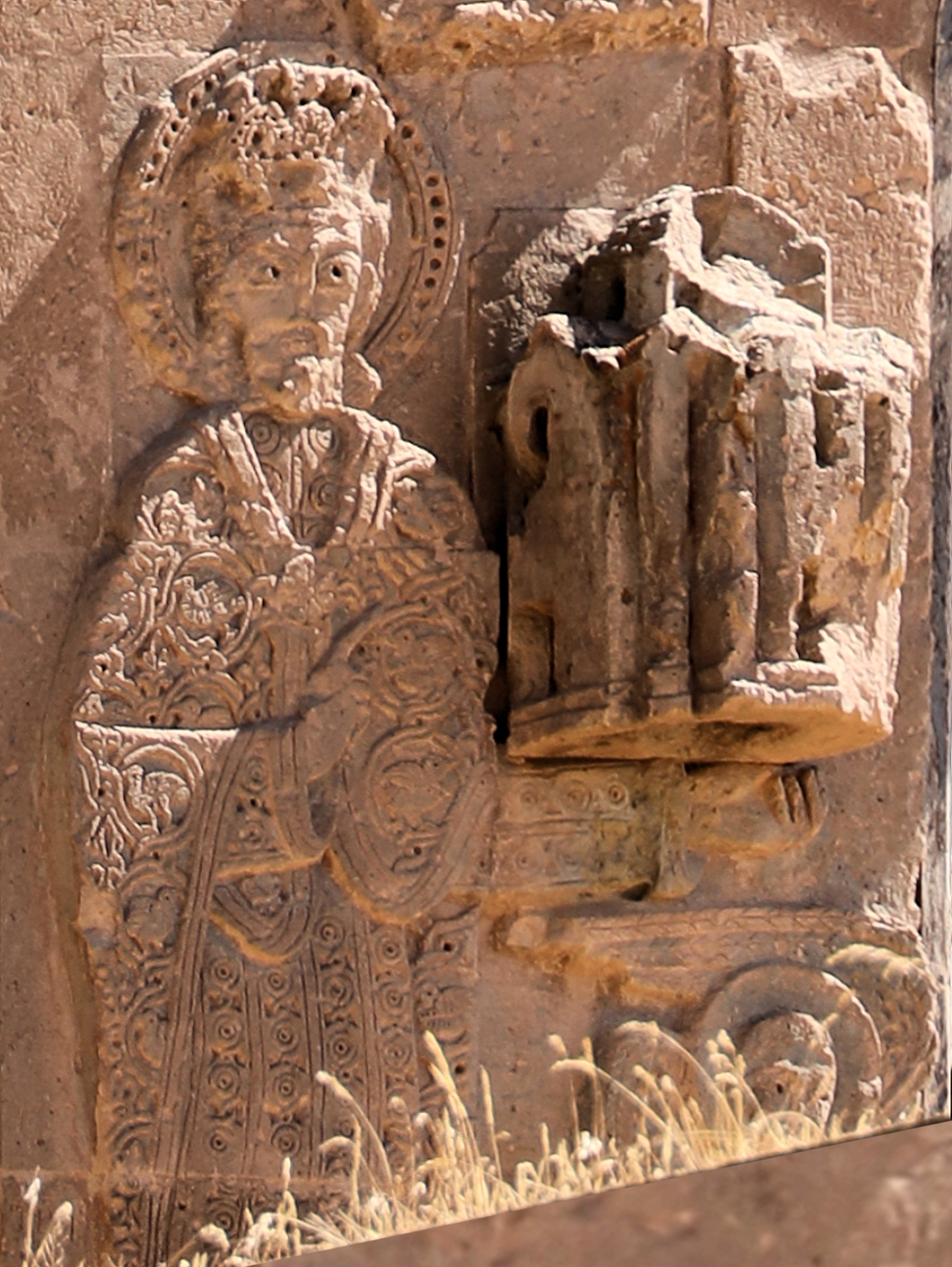
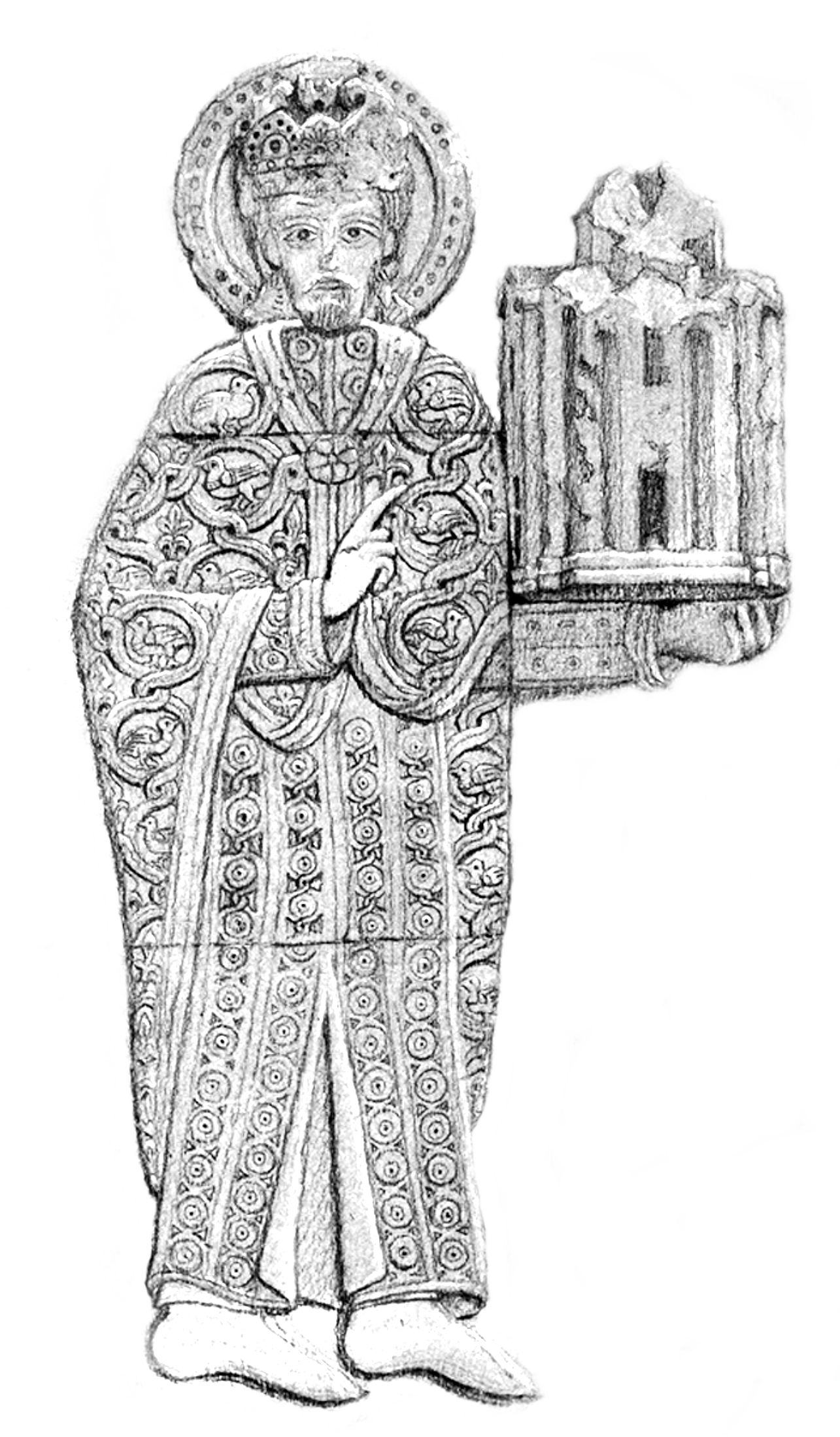
Gagik I sculpture at Cathedral of the Holy Cross, Аghtamar.

== See also ==
- Gospels of Queen Mlké

== Bibliography ==
- Նորայր Բիւզանդացի, Թովմա Արծրունի եւ Անանուն Արծրունի երկու այլեւայլ պատմագիրներ են,- «Բազմավէպ», 1905, էջ 227-233, 264-271, 328-337, 398-407, 464-471։
- Ծովական Ն., Թովմա Արծրունի. բնագրական սրբագրութիւններ,- Սիոն, 1965, էջ 319-320։
- Վարդանյան Վ. Մ., «Պատմութիւն տանն Արծրունեաց» երկում հիշատակված մի քանի տեղանունների մասին.- «Պատմա-բանասիրական հանդես», 1973, № 1, էջ 111-122։
- Թովմա Արծրունի, Պատմութիւն Տանն Արծրունեաց, ՍՊԲ, 1887.
- Լալայան Երևան, Վասպուրական. նշանավոր վանքերը, Թ., 1912.
- Thomson R.W., ‘T‘ovmay Arcruni as Historian’, in T.J. Samuelian and M.E. Stone (eds.), Medieval Armenian culture, Chico CA, 1984, pp. 69–80.
- Thomson R.W., ‘T‘ovmay Arcruni’s debt to Ełišē’,- "Revue des Études Arméniennes",18 (1984), pp. 227-235.
- Մարգարիտա Դարբինյան-Մելիքյան, Ո՞վ է Թովմայի «Պատմութիւնն տանն Արծրունեաց»-ի «Մանիթոպ արքայ Խեփտաղաց»-ը.- «Պատմա-բանասիրական հանդես «, 2005, № 2, էջ 183-188։
- Greenwood Tim, Entries on ‘The History of Sebeos’; ‘The Letter of Leo III in Ghewond’; ‘Movsēs Daskhurants‘i’ and ‘Ghewond’; in Christian-Muslim Relations. A Bibliographical History vol. 1 (600-900), ed. D. Thomas and B. Roggema, (Leiden, 2009), 139-144, 203-208, 261-267 and 866-871.
- Greenwood Tim, Entry on 'T'ovma Artsruni',- "Christian-Muslim Relations. A Bibliographical History", vol. 2 (900-1050), ed. D. Thomas and A. Mallett, (Leiden, 2010), 102-107.
- Орбели И.А., Памятники армянского зодчества на острове Ахтамар, Избр. труды, т.1, М., 1968.
- Der-Nersessian S., Aghtamar, Cambridge, 1965.
- spirogly M., Die Kirche von Achtamar, B.-Meinz, 1963.
- Adalian, Rouben Paul (2010). Historical Dictionary of Armenia.
- Khach'atryan, Hayk; Sekhpossian, Nouné; Merguerian, Barbara J. (2001). Queens of the Armenians: 150 biographies based on history and legend.
- Martin-Hisard, Bernadette (1982). Arab Domination and Armenian Freedoms (seventh-ninth century). Toulouse: Privat. ISBN 978-2-7089-6874-5.
- Toumanoff, Cyrille (1990). The dynasties of Christian antiquity to the Caucasus of xixth century. Rome.
- Thierry, Jean-Michel (1982). Northern Kingdom and Southern Kingdom. Privat. ISBN 978-2-7089-6874-5.
- Jones, Lynn (2007). Between Islam and Byzantium: Aght'amar and the Visual Construction of Medieval Armenian Rulership. Ashgate Publishing. ISBN 978-0754638520.
- Grousset, René (1947). History of Armenia from its origins to 1071. Payot. ISBN 978-2-228-88912-4.
- Kazhdan, Alexander, ed. (1991). The Oxford Dictionary of Byzantium. Oxford and New York: Oxford University Press. pp. 161, 2154. ISBN 0-19-504652-8.
- Jones, Lynn. The Church of the Holy Cross and the Iconography of Kingship. Vol. 33. Gesta.
- Garsoïan, Nina G. (1997). "The independent kingdoms of medieval Armenia". In Hovhannisian, Richard G. (ed.). The Armenian People from Ancient to Modern Times. Volume 1, The Dynastic Periods: From Antiquity to the Fourteenth Century. New York: St. Martin's Press. pp. 143–185. ISBN 0-312-10169-4.
- Ter-Ghewondyan, Aram (1976). The Arab Emirates in Bagratid Armenia. Translated by Nina G. Garsoïan. Lisbon: Livraria Bertrand. OCLC 490638192.

Regnal titles
New title	King of Vaspurakan; 908–937/943	Succeeded by Derenik-Ashot
Preceded by Ashot-Sargis Artsruni	Prince of northwest Vaspurakan; 904–908	Crowned as king
