= Kavash =

Kavash may refer to:

- Gevaş, a district of Turkey
- Khash, Iran, a city in Iran
