= Robert Morham =

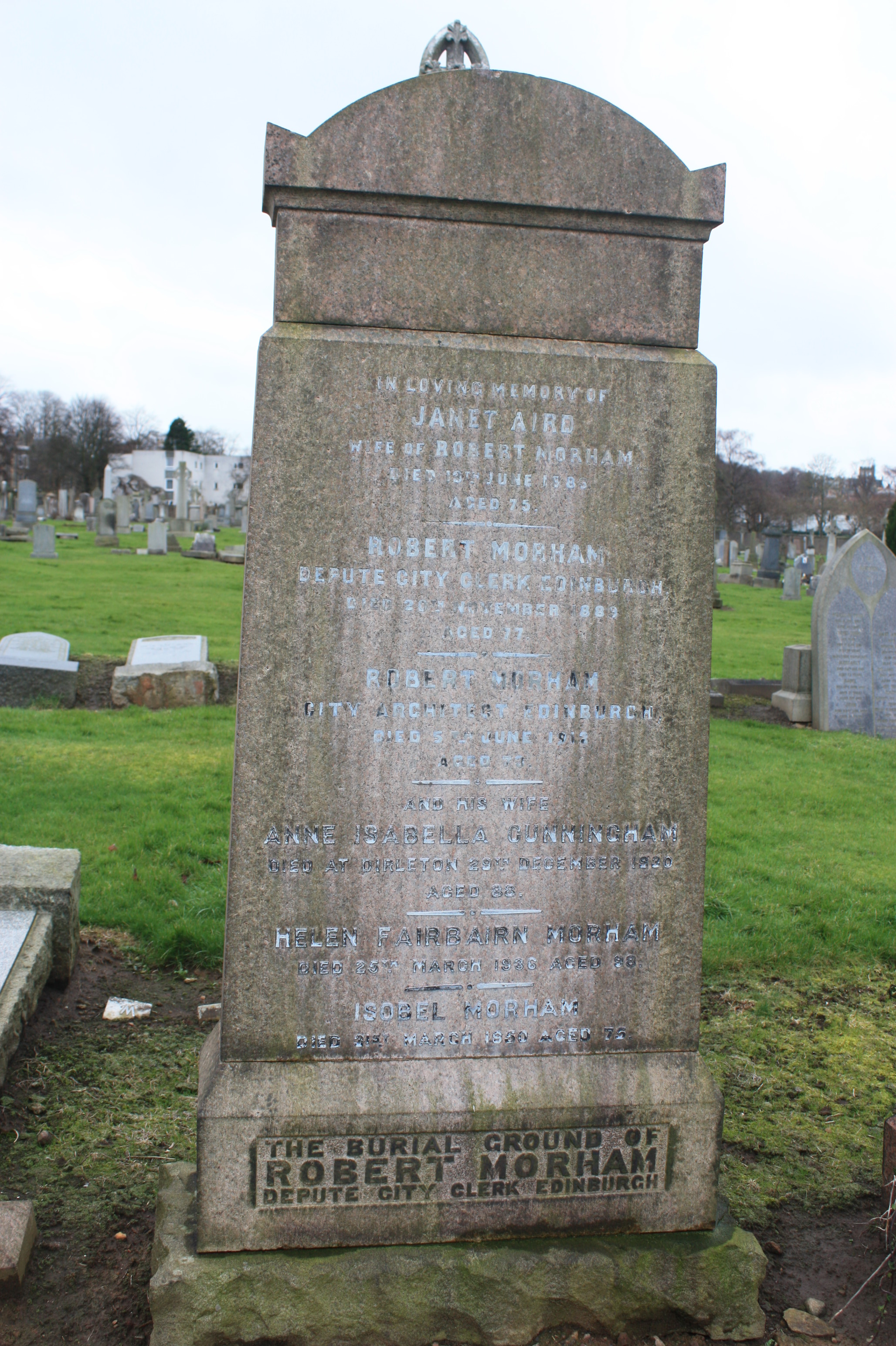
The grave of Robert Morham, Morningside Cemetery, Edinburgh

Robert Morham (31 March 1839 – 5 June 1912) was the City Architect for Edinburgh for the last decades of the nineteenth century and was responsible for much of the “public face” of the city at the time.

His work is particularly well represented within Edinburgh City Chambers where each of the high Victoriana main council chambers (Edinburgh Room, Nelson Mandela Room, European Room etc.) is under his hand.

Most of his buildings are utilitarian in function: police stations, fire stations, swimming baths etc. and these are generally atypical of the Edinburgh streetscape in terms of material being generally in red sandstone rather than cream. This allows the public buildings to quickly be identified in the streets concerned.

His work in parks is also noteworthy including one of the world's best known public spaces, Princes Street Gardens. This included negotiations for the widening of Princes Street and the placing of a great number of statues along the edge of the park facing that road.

== Life ==
He was the son of Robert Morham (1812-1889) Depute City Clerk, and his wife Janet Aird (1808-1883), who lived at 13 Lauder Road, which remained his home for all his life. To avoid confusion he styled himself Robert Morham Jr for much of his early life.

He was educated at Newington Academy and the Royal High School.

In 1854 he was articled to David Rhind and in 1859 transferred to David Bryce, both prominent architects of their day. In 1862 he moved to London to work for William Eden Nesfield. In 1866 he returned to Edinburgh and joined David Cousin, later becoming his business partner. His works until 1873 are under Cousin. From that date he became City Superintendent of Works (City Architect). That year he also married Anne Isabella Cunningham with whom he had five sons and one daughter.

In later years he employed James Anderson Williamson who succeeded him as City architect in 1908 having been Deputy since 1898.

Morham left almost £11,000 in his will. A huge sum for his day.

He is buried with his parents and wife, Ann Isabella Cunningham, in Morningside Cemetery, Edinburgh west of his family home. His brother George Morham (1846-1926), who became a civil engineer and probably aided Robert on several projects, is buried slightly to the south of his grave, as is his sister Margaret Ann Morham, who married the Edinburgh architect John McLachan and is back-to-back with Robert and her parents.

Several people trained or worked under him in his role, including Alexander Lorne Campbell.

== List of works ==
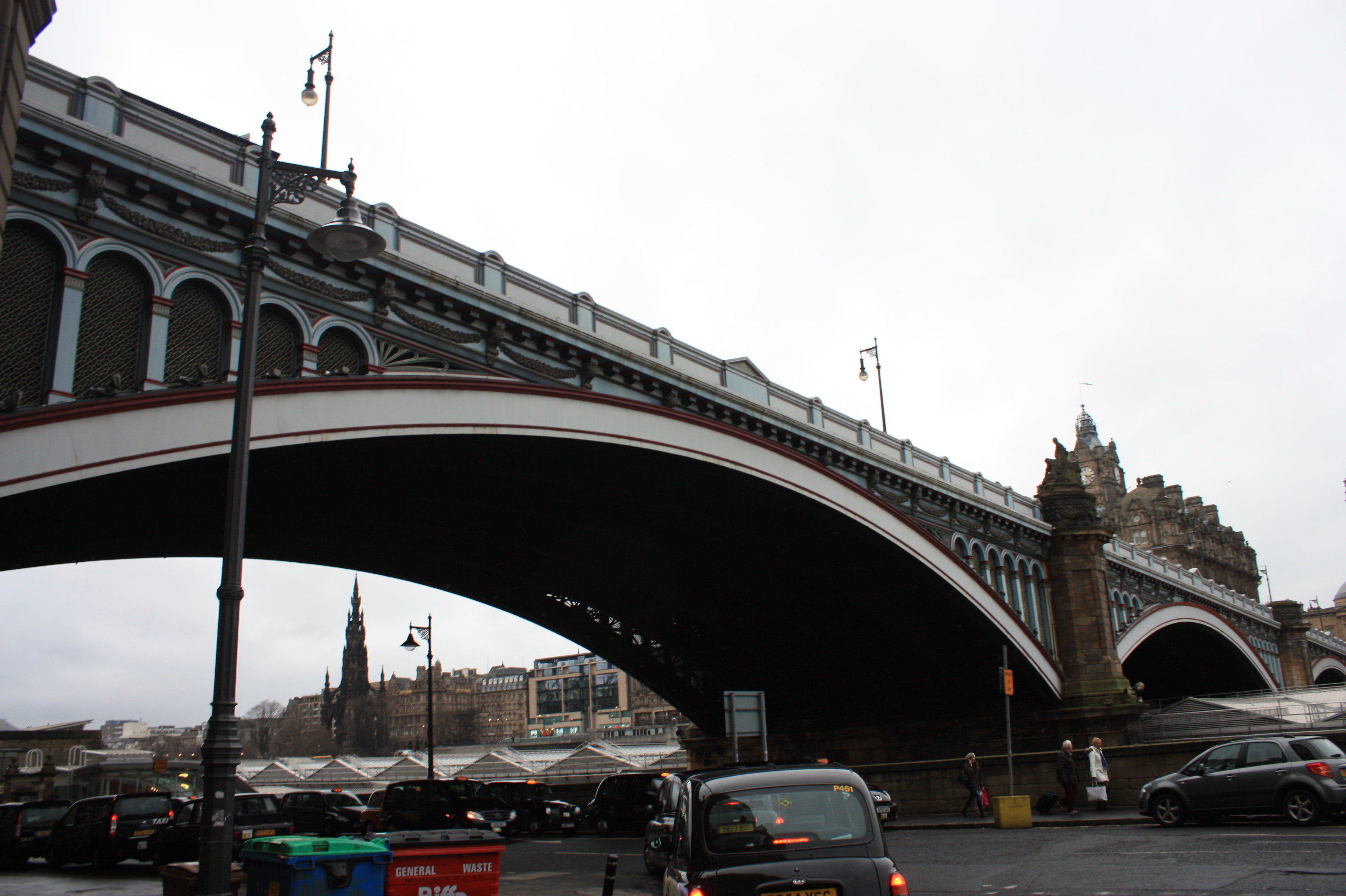
The ornamental ironwork on North Bridge, Edinburgh, by Robert Morham

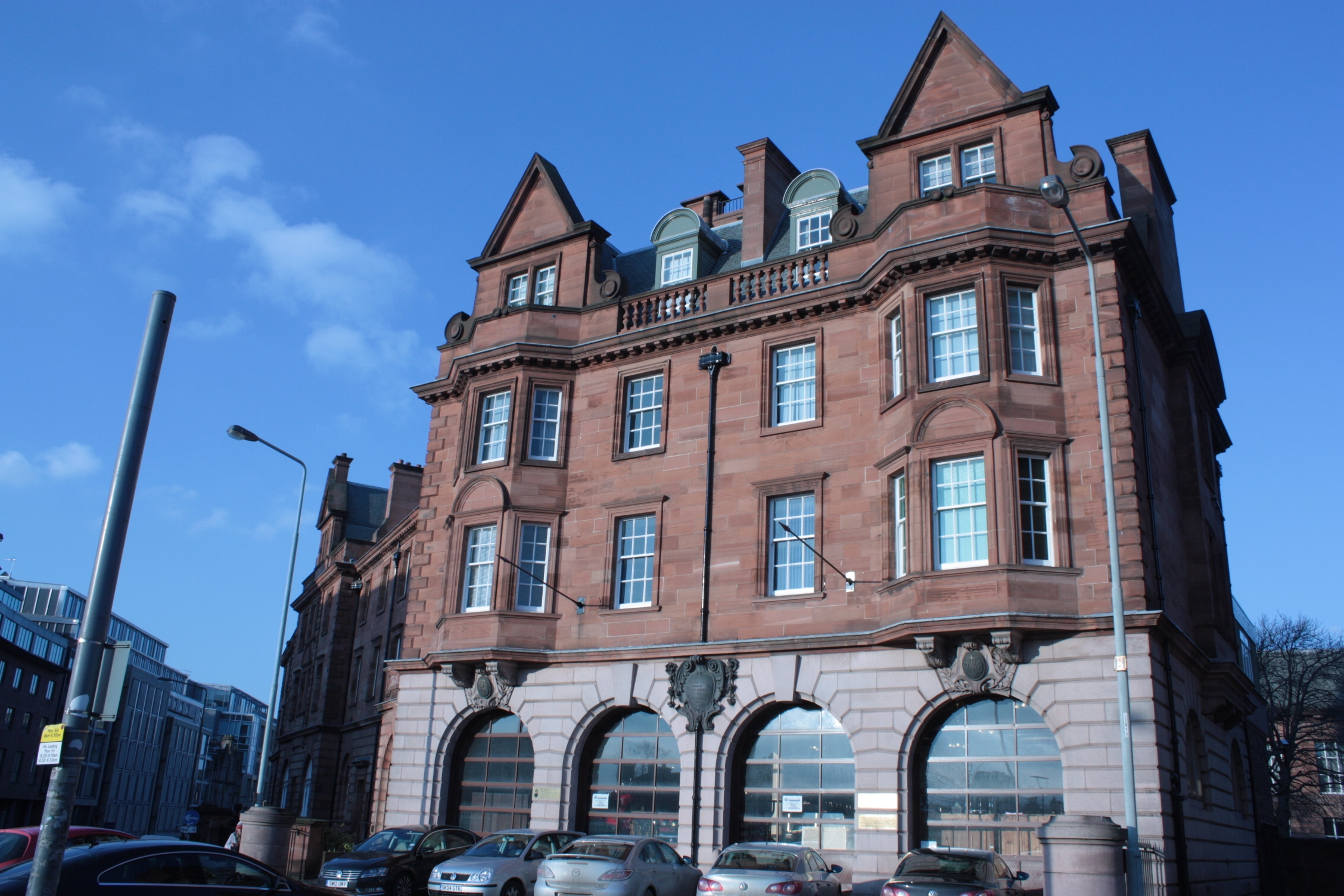
Fire Station on Lauriston Place

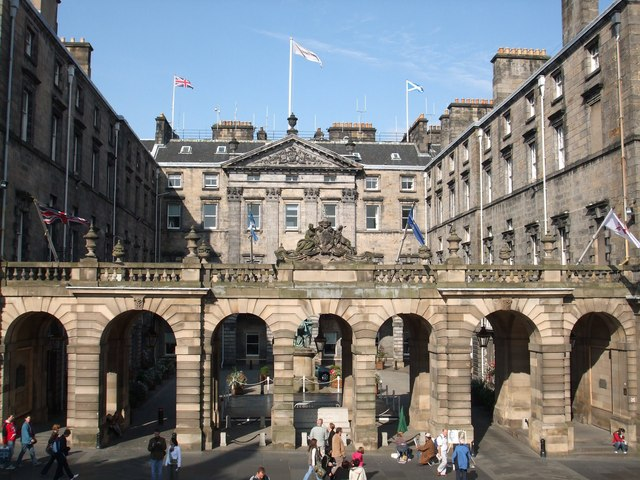
Edinburgh City Chambers showing the arcade added by Morham to the front

Most of Morham's works constitute "public buildings" and mainly still survive, contributing greatly to the character of the city. All are in Edinburgh and almost all are listed buildings, exemplifying the quality of Morham's works.

- Robertson Memorial Church, Kilgraston Road (then the Grange Church till 1972, now Marchmont St Giles' Parish Church ) (1869), listed category B.
- Blackfriars Street Church (1870-1), listed category C.
- Remodelling of the interior of St Giles Cathedral creating one single volume from the former three spaces (1871), listed category A.
- Tenements at 60 High Street (Royal Mile)/1-9 Blackfriars Street (1873), listed category B
- Addition of corner turrets to the married soldiers quarters at 25 Johnston Terrace (now Castlecliff Workshops) (1874), listed category C.
- Remodelling of Canongate Tolbooth in a medieval revivalist style (including interiors) (1875), listed category A
- Torphichen Street Police Station (1894) plus 1908 rebuild, listed category C.
- Buildings on the corner of Waverley Bridge and East Market Street (for Waverley Station) (1874-6). Now LRT information office, the Edinburgh Dungeon and the Edinburgh Tattoo Offices/Shop. Listed category A.
- The original Waverley Market (1874-6) between Waverley Station and Princes Street (1874-6) Demolished 1977. Only some ornate ironwork survives.
- Interior remodelling of Edinburgh City Chambers including most of the present Council Debating Chambers (1875) listed category A.
- Remodelling of West Princes Street Gardens (1876) following acquisition of the private garden grounds from Princes Street residents.
- School at south end of Blackfriars Street (now St Ann's Community Centre) (1879–80) listed category C.
- Addition of a storey at 104-112 Hanover Street (1880)
- Remodelling of 13-23 Shandwick Place (1880)
- 30-34 Upper Gray Street (1880) listed category B.
- Slateford Fire Station (1882)
- West Port Police Station (1882) now a bar (50 West Port) listed category B.
- Fountainbridge Meat Market (1884) (largely demolished but the arches and bulls heads from the entrance have been kept as a feature on the street).
- "Creation of "The Old Senate Room" in Edinburgh University's Old College (1883) listed category A.
- Causewayside Police Station and Fire Station (1885) listed category B.
- Infirmary Street Baths (1885-7) (recently restored and remodelled) listed category B.
- Fountain at the St Leonards entrance into Holyrood Park (1886)
- The Gardener's Cottage in West Princes Street Gardens (1886) listed category C.
- Laying out of Inverleith Park.
- Dalry Baths, Caledonian Crescent (1893-5)
- The huge stone piers to support North Bridge (1894)
- Building of the Electric Lighting Central Generating Station (1894) and offices, Dewar Place, now a 275,000 volt grid supply substation, with the only installation of gas insulated and cooled transformers in the UK. Of the power station only the frontages and some basement structures remain. Listed category B. The offices are currently vacant and are not listed.
- Remodelling interior of the City Observatory on Calton Hill (1895-8)
- City Hospital, Greenbank Drive (1896-1903) converted to housing (The Steils) c.1990 Listed category B.
- Police Station at 55 Abbeyhill (latterly an Armenian restaurant now vacant) (1896) listed category B.
- Ornamentation design for ironwork on North Bridge (1897) listed category A.
- Glenogle Baths, Stockbridge (1897-1900) listed category B.
- 47,48 Greenbank Drive (1900) listed category B. (linked to the City Hospital).
- Lauriston Place Fire Station (1897-1901)
- Portobello Baths, Marlborough Street (1898) listed category C.
- Remodelling of Edinburgh City Chambers including a new NW wing (1898-9) listed category A.
- MacDonald Road Electricity Generating Station (1899) listed category C.
- Portsburgh Square (1900) (with the City Engineer)
- Creation of an arcade at the front of Edinburgh City Chambers (1901) listed category A.
- Morningside Public Library (1905)
- Bridge at Saughton Park (1908)
