= Akdamar Island =

Island in Lake Van, eastern Turkey

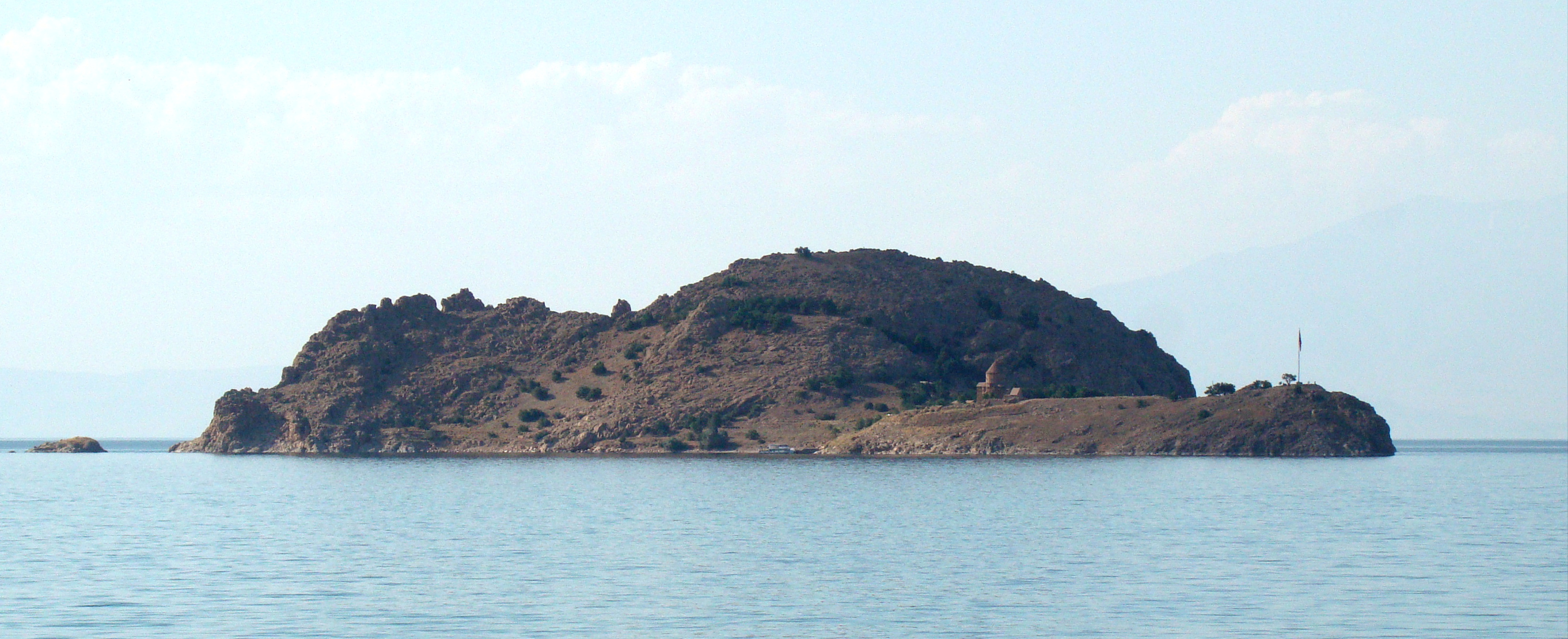
- Akdamar Island seen from the south shore of Lake Van, near the town of Gevaş

- Location within Turkey

Geography
- Location: Lake Van
- Coordinates: 38°20′30″N 43°02′07″E
- Total islands: 1
- Area: 0.7 km^{2} (0.27 sq mi)
- Length: 0.7 km (0.43 mi)
- Width: 0.6 km (0.37 mi)
- Coastline: 2 km (1.2 mi)
- Highest elevation: 1,912 m (6273 ft)

Administration
- Turkey
- Province: Van
- District: Gevaş

Akdamar Island (Turkish: Akdamar Adası), also known as Aghtamar (Armenian: Աղթամար, romanized: Aġt’amar) or Akhtamar (Armenian: Ախթամար, romanized: Axt’amar; Kurdish: Girava Axtamarê), is the second largest of the four main islands in Lake Van, in eastern Turkey. About 0.7 km^{2} in size, it is situated approximately 3 km from the shoreline. At the western end of the island, a hard, grey, limestone cliff rises 80 m above the lake's level (1,912 m above sea level). The island declines to the east to a level site where a spring provides ample water.

It is home to the 10th century Armenian Holy Cross Cathedral, which was the seat of the Armenian Apostolic Catholicosate of Aghtamar from 1116 to 1895.

== Etymology ==
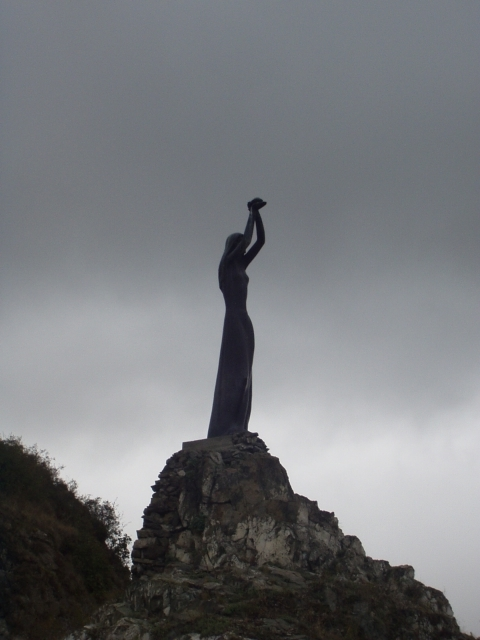
A statue of princess Tamar waiting for her love, near Sevan Lake, Armenia. The author is Armenian-American sculptor Rafael Petrosyan.

The origin and meaning of the island's name is unknown, but a folk etymology explanation exists, based on an old Armenian legend. According to the tale, an Armenian princess named Tamar lived on the island and was in love with a commoner. This boy would swim from the shore to the island each night, guided by a light she lit for him. Her father learned of the boy's visits. One night, as she waited for her lover to arrive, her father smashed her light, leaving the boy in the middle of the lake without a guide to indicate which direction to swim. He drowned and his body washed ashore and, as the legend concludes, it appeared as if the words "Akh, Tamar" (Oh, Tamar) were frozen on his lips. The legend was the inspiration for a well-known 1891 poem by Hovhannes Tumanyan.

The similar-sounding Akdamar (meaning "white vein" in Turkish) has since become the official name of the island.

== History ==
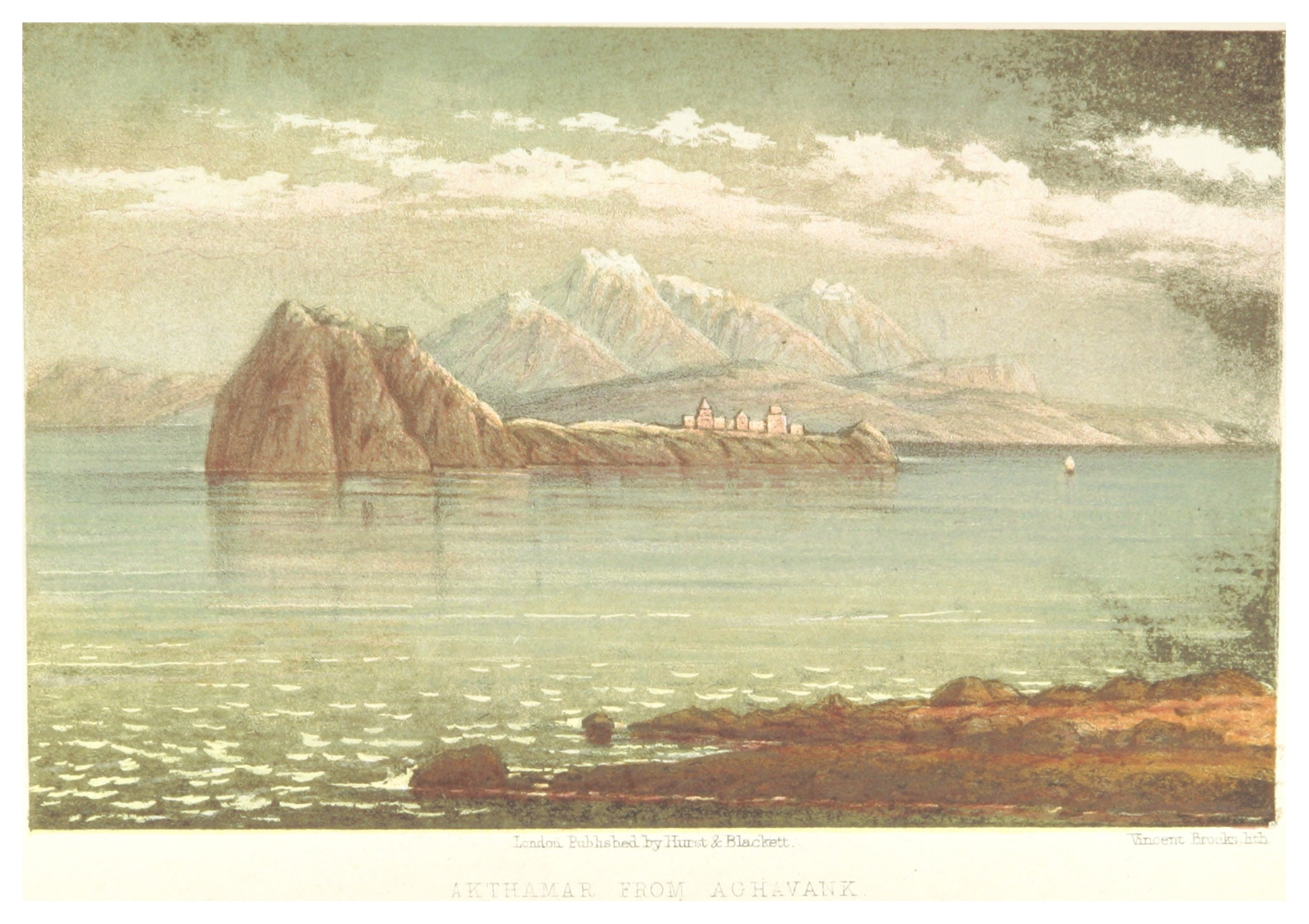
"Akthamar from Aghavank" an engraving c. 1860

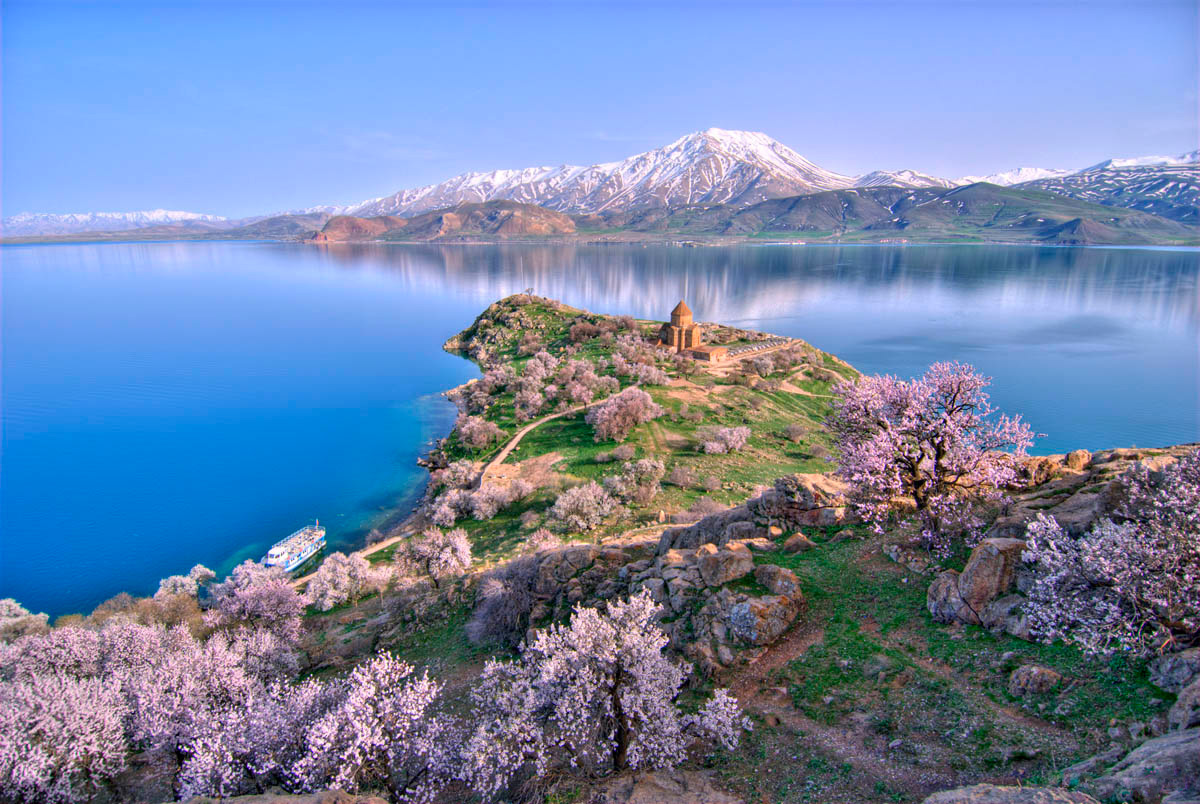
General view of Akdamar Island in springtime.

During his reign, King Gagik I Artsruni (r. 908-943/944) of the Armenian Kingdom of Vaspurakan chose the island as one of his residences. He founded a settlement and erected a large square palace richly decorated with frescoes, built a dock noted for its complex hydrotechnical engineering, laid out streets, gardens, and orchards, and planted trees and designed areas of recreation for himself and his court. The only surviving structure from that period is the Palatine Cathedral of the Holy Cross (Armenian: Սուրբ Խաչ եկեղեցի Surb Khach yekeġetsi). It was built of pink volcanic tuff by the architect-monk Manuel during the years 915-921, with an interior measuring 14.80m × 11.5m and the dome reaching 20.40m above ground. In later centuries, and until 1915, it formed part of a monastic complex, the ruins of which can still be seen to the south of the church.

Between 1116 and 1895 the island was the location of the Catholicosate of Aghtamar of the Armenian Apostolic Church. Khachatur III, who died in 1895, was the last Catholicos of Aght'amar. In April 1915, during the Armenian genocide, the monks on Aght'amar were massacred, the cathedral looted, and the monastic buildings destroyed.

On August 28, 2010, a small solar energy power plant was opened on the island, to provide local installations with electricity.

== Holy Cross Cathedral ==
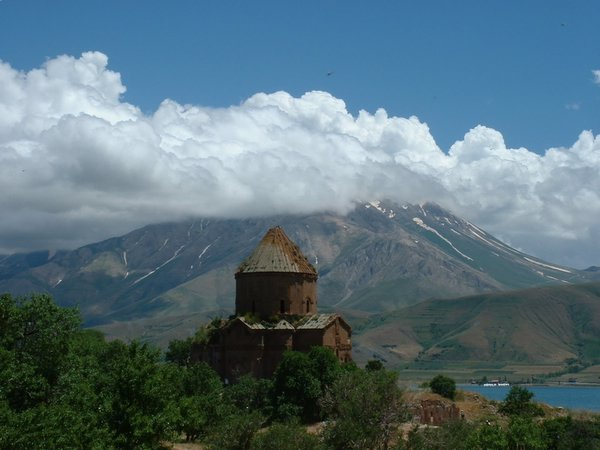
The Armenian Cathedral of the Holy Cross

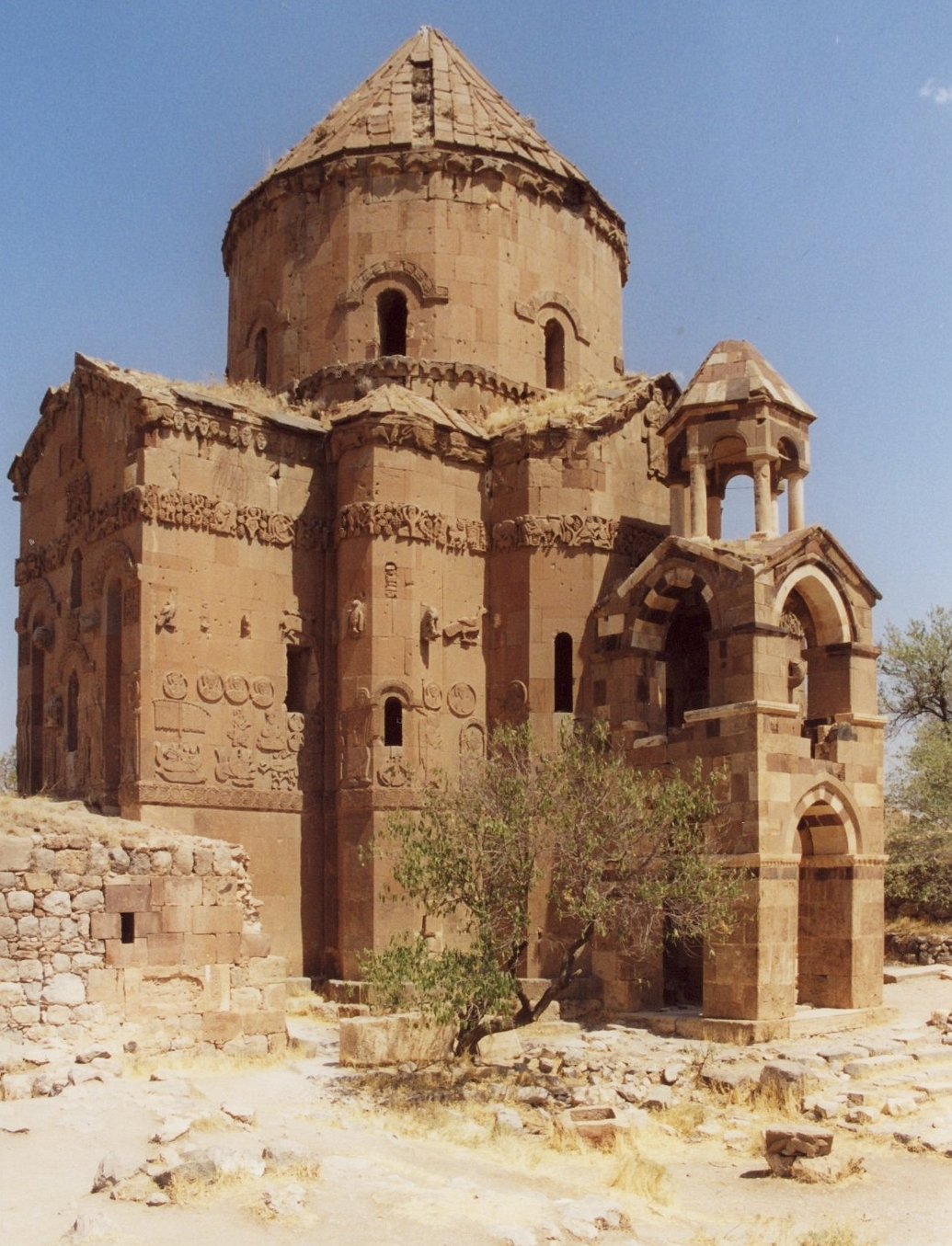
The cathedral.

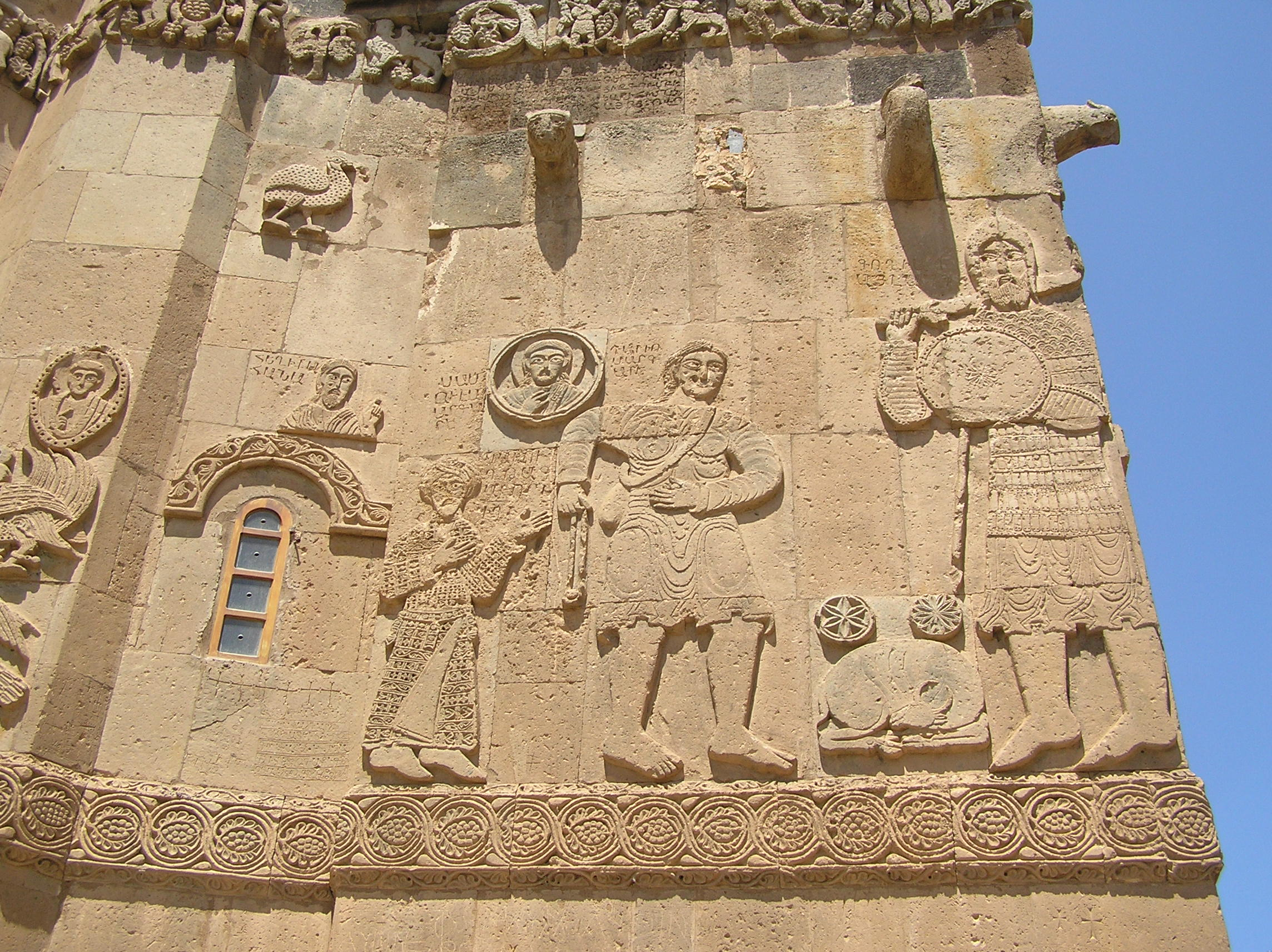
A detail of David and Goliath from the cathedral

The architecture of the church is based on a form that had been developed in Armenia several centuries earlier; the best-known example being that of the seventh century St. Hripsime church in Echmiadzin, incorporating a dome with a conical roof.

The unique importance of the Cathedral Church of the Holy Cross comes from the extensive array of bas-relief carving of mostly biblical scenes that adorn its external walls. The meanings of these reliefs have been the subject of much and varied interpretation. Not all of this speculation has been produced in good faith - for example, Turkish sources illustrate Islamic and Turkic influences behind the content of some of the reliefs, such as the prominent depiction of a prince sitting cross-legged on a Turkic-style, low throne. Some scholars assert that the friezes parallel contemporary motifs found in Umayyad art - such as a turbaned prince, Arab styles of dress, wine imagery; allusions to royal Sassanian imagery are also present (griffins, for example).

=== Vandalism ===
After 1915, the church has been exposed to extensive vandalism. Before the restoration of the church, the reliefs on the church wall used as a shooting range. Zakarya Mildanoğlu, an architect who was involved in the restoration process of the church, explains the situation during an interview with Hrant Dink as "The facade of the church is full of bullet holes. Some of them are so big that they can not be covered during the renovation process." During many conferences related to the restoration of the Akhtamar church, the process of covering the bullet holes are identified as the hardest part of the restoration by academicians and architects. Some claim that the Armenian churches and gravestones have been exposed to vandalism as a part of the Turkish government policy which aims to destroy the Armenian heritage in Anatolia.

In 1951 an order was issued to demolish the church, but the writer Yasar Kemal managed to stop its destruction. He explained the situation to Alain Bosquet as "I was in a ship from Tatvan to Van. I met with a military officer Dr. Cavit Bey on board. I told him, in this city there is a church descended from Armenians. It is a masterpiece. These days, they are demolishing this church. I will take you there tomorrow. This church is a monument of Anatolia. Can you help me to stop the destruction? The next day we went there with the military officer. They have already demolished the small chapel next to the church. The military officer became angry and told the workers, "I am ordering you to stop working. I will meet with governor. There will be no movement until I return to the island again". The workers immediately stopped the demolition. We arrived at Van city center. I contacted the newspaper Cumhuriyet. They informed the Ministry of Education about the demolition. Two days later, Minister Avni Başman telegraphed the Van governor and ordered to stop the demolition permanently. June 25, 1951, the day when the order came, is the liberation day of the church."

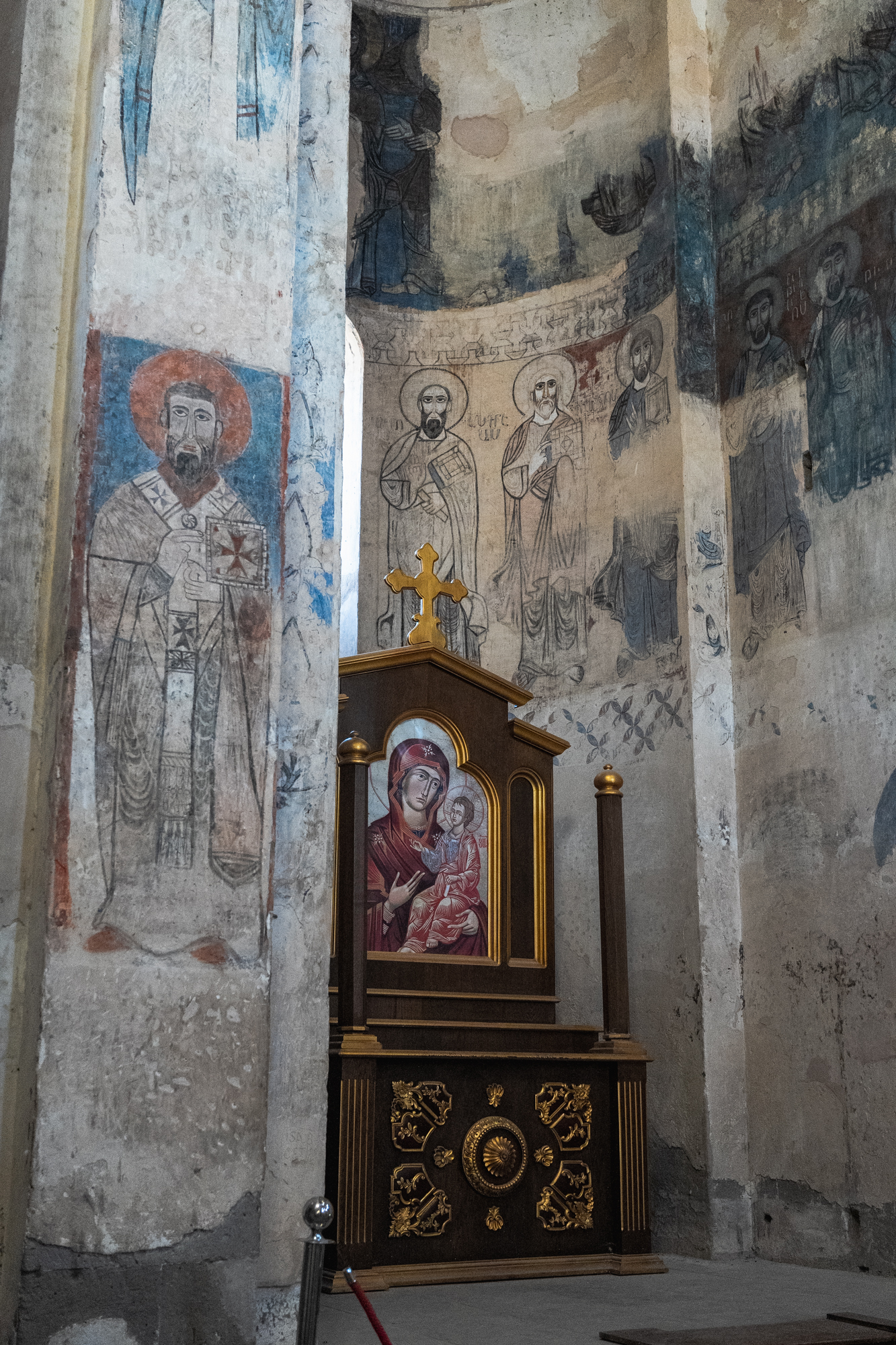
Interior of the cathedral

=== Restoration ===
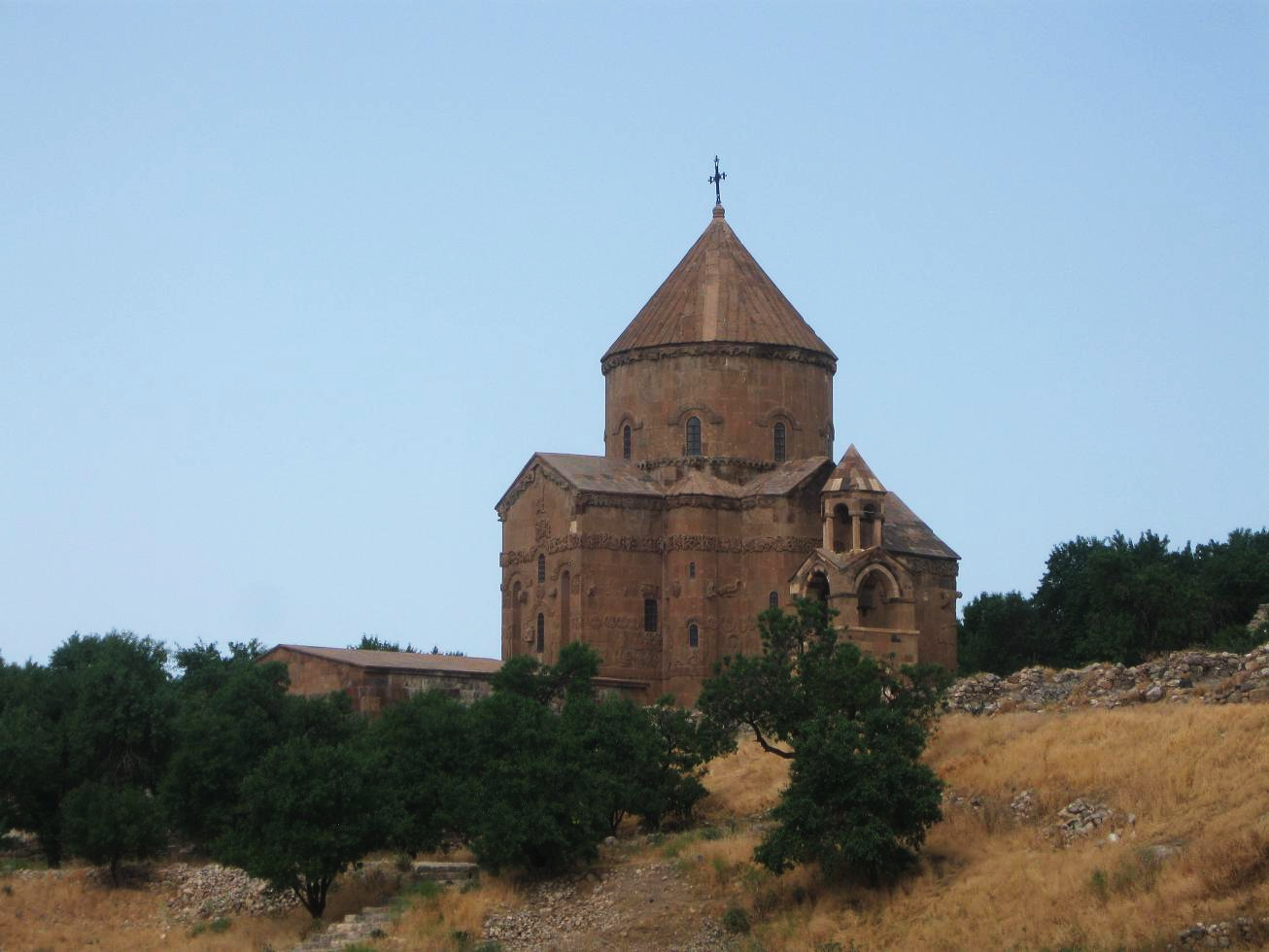
The cross was mounted on top of the Armenian cathedral after restoration.

Between May 2005 and October 2006, the church underwent a controversial restoration program. The restoration had a stated budget of 2 million Turkish Lira (approximately 1.4 million USD) and was financed by the Turkish Ministry of Culture. It officially re-opened as a museum on 29 March 2007 in a ceremony attended by the Turkish Minister of Culture, government officials, ambassadors of several countries, Patriarch Mesrob II (spiritual leader of the Armenian Orthodox community of Turkey), a delegation from Armenia headed by the Deputy to the Armenian Minister of Culture, and a large group of invited journalists from many news organizations around the world.

Özdemir Çakacak, the Governor of Van, described the refurbishing of the church as "a show of Turkey's respect for history and culture". A Turkish state department museum official added, "We could not have ignored the artifacts of our Armenian citizens, and we did not." Signs heralding the church reopening declared "Tarihe saygı, kültüre saygı" ("Respect the history, respect the culture").

The initial Divine Liturgy in Holy Cross Church took place on 19 September, 2010. Prior to the opening of the Church, a concert was performed by pianist Şahan Arzruni. According to Maximilian Hartmuth, an academician at Sabancı University, "the church was turned into a museum rather than re-opened as a place of worship following the restoration was, for example, claimed to be a wedge separating the monument from Turkey’s Armenian community. The critics, writing for media such as Radikal, Milliyet, or Turkish Daily News, furthermore lamented that permission to re-mount the cross on top of the church was not given. Moreover, they argued, the official name of the museum, the Turkish Akdamar (translating as “white vein”) rather than the original Armenian Ahtamar – the name of the island in Lake Van on which the church stands and Surp Haç (Holy Cross) for the church itself would suggest this to be a Turkish monument. At the same time only sparing use was made of the word “Armenian” in official statements. With Turkey's Armenian community not granted the privilege to hold a service at least once a year - as had been requested - and a large Turkish flag flying over the island, it was suggested by some critics that this project really announced the “Turkification” of this monument, the initiative being no more than a media stunt."

=== Controversies ===
Armenian religious leaders invited to attend the opening ceremony opted to boycott the event, because the church was being reopened as a secular museum. Controversy surrounded the issue of whether the cross atop the dome until 1915 should be replaced. Some Armenians said that the renovation was unfinished until the cross was replaced, and that prayer should be allowed inside at least once a year. A cross had been prepared nearly a year before the opening, and Mesrob II petitioned the Prime Minister and Minister of Culture to place the cross on the dome of the cathedral. Turkish officials cited technical difficulties related to the structure of the restored building which may not be able to safely hold a heavy cross on top without further reinforcement.

The controversial cross was erected on the top of the church on October 2, 2010. The cross was sent by the Armenian Patriarchate of Istanbul to Van by plane. It is 2 meters high and weigh 110 kilograms. It was put on top of the church after being sanctified by Armenian clergymen. Since 2010, every year a mass is held in the church too.

The opening was controversial among some Turkish nationalist groups, who protested at the island and in a separate demonstration in Ankara. Police detained five Turkish nationals who carried a banner declaring "The Turkish people are noble. They would never commit genocide." Demonstrators outside the Ministry of the Interior in Ankara chanted slogans against the possibility of a cross being erected atop the church, declaring "You are all Armenians, we are all Turks and Muslims".

Hürriyet columnist Cengiz Çandar characterized the way the Turkish government handled the opening as an extension of an ongoing "cultural genocide" of the Armenians. He characterizes the renaming of the church from Armenian to Turkish as part of a broader program to rename Armenian historical sites in Turkey, and attributes the refusal to place a cross atop the church as symptomatic of religious intolerance in Turkish society. (This was written before the cross was placed at its place on top of the church in 2010)

What do you think “our set” are trying to do? If you ask me, they would like “to appear righteous and benefit politically.” And naturally they make a mess out of it. The initial plans were for the opening of Ahtamar to take place on Apr. 24. A real cunning idea... As it is known to be the “Armenian genocide remembrance day in the world,” a trump for propaganda would have been used on that day. Then the date became Apr. 11. According to the ancient Armenian calendar, Apr. 11 coincides with Apr. 24. They probably knew this also. They were still pursuing another cunning idea. At the end, it was decided that the opening of Ahtamar, now “Akdamar,” would take place on Mar. 29, as a restoration opening of a museum-church, without a cross or a bell.

Turkish deputy minister for culture, İsmet Yılmaz cited technical reasons for not being able to place a cross atop the dome of the church:

“The reconstruction, which was carried out by Italian specialists, makes it impossible for the dome to support the 2-meter, 200-kilogram cross. If we put up the cross without making any changes, even a breeze will harm the dome. We plan to invite other specialists to solve this problem.”

Although this explanation from the government met with doubts, after the cross was erected on the dome of the church in 2010 (which weighed 110 kg - about half of what the Turkish deputy minister spoke about), after 2011 Van earthquake cracks appeared around the dome of the church.

Çandar notes that the Agos issue published on the day of the murder of Hrant Dink featured a Dink commentary on the Turkish government's handling of the Akdamar issue, which the late journalist characterized as "A real comedy... A real tragedy..." According to Dink,

The government hasn't still been able to formulate a correct approach to the “Armenian question.” Its real aim is not to solve the problem, but to gain points like a wrestler in a contest. How and when it will make the right move and defeat its opponent. That's the only concern. This is not earnestness. The state calls on Armenian historians to discuss history, but does not shy from trying its own intellectuals who have an unorthodox rhetoric on the Armenian genocide. It restores an Armenian church in the Southeast, but only thinks, “How can I use this for political gains in the world, how can I sell it?”

Historian Ara Sarafian has answered some criticism of the Akdamar project, stating that, on the contrary, the project represents an answer to allegations of cultural genocide. He has stated that the revitalization of the site is "an important peace offering" from the Turkish government.

The Armenian delegation attending the opening, led by the Deputy Minister of Culture and Youth Affairs; Gagik Giurjyan, faced obstacles on their way to the opening. They had to travel 16 hours by bus through Georgia to Turkey, due to the closure of the Turkish-Armenian border by Turkey.

Ian Herbert, writing in The Independent, records his own experiences traveling in Turkey on an invitation from the Turkish government in the period of the opening of Akdamar:

So desperate is Mr Erdogan's government to demonstrate its tolerance of Turkey's 70,000 Armenian minority that it took journalists around the country this week. The trip revealed more than the government might have intended: Armenian schools in Istanbul where only the Turkish version of history - ignoring 1915 - is taught; Armenian priests who need metal detectors at their churches because of the threat of extremists; and, at the newspaper offices of the murdered Turkish-Armenian writer Hrant Dink, a stream of abusive emails from nationalists.

Cengiz Aktar, an academic of Galatasaray University, also took a critical stance towards the loss of the island's original name in his article titled "White Vein church and others" (Akdamar means "white vein" in Turkish).

Not all the comments were negative of the restoration of the church by the Turkish government. British historian of Armenian descent, Ara Sarafian considered the opening of the church for service as "a positive step".

== Gallery ==
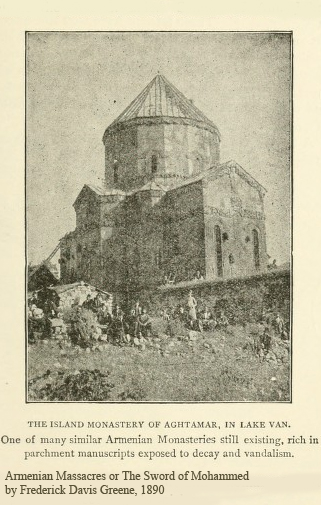
The church in 1890.

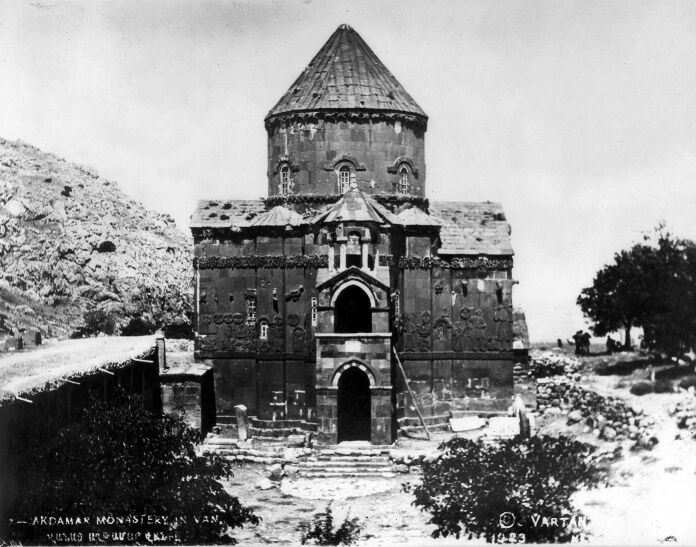
The church in 1923.

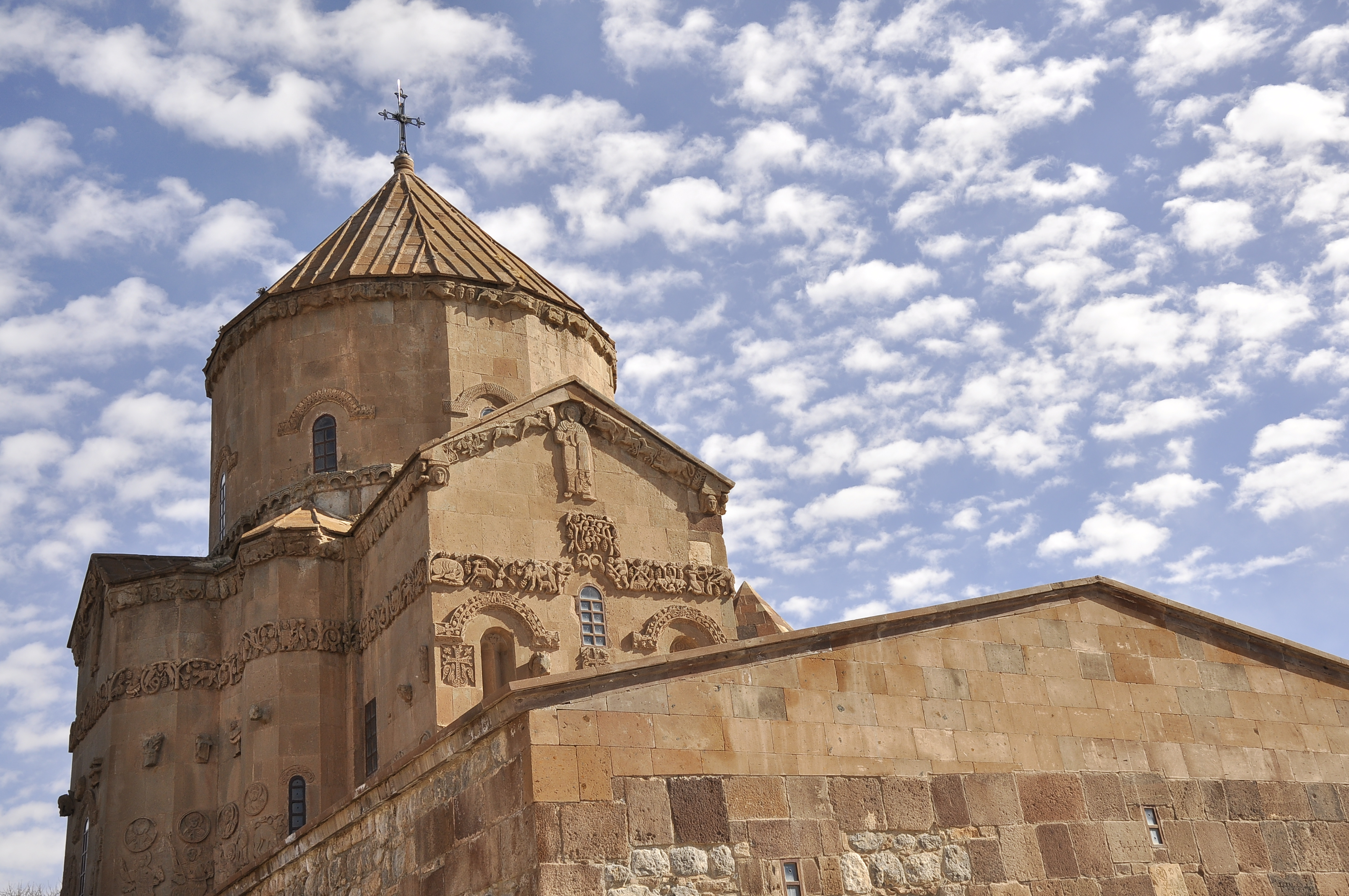
The church in 2013.

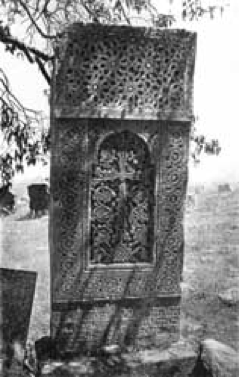
An Armenian cross-stone (khachkar) dated 1434 (in a photo published in 1913)

== See also ==
- Adır Island
- Çarpanak Island
- Kuş Island
- Aghtamar Lake Van Monastery in Exile
