= 55 Abbeyhill =

Former police station, religious hall, and restaurant in Abbeyhill, Edinburgh

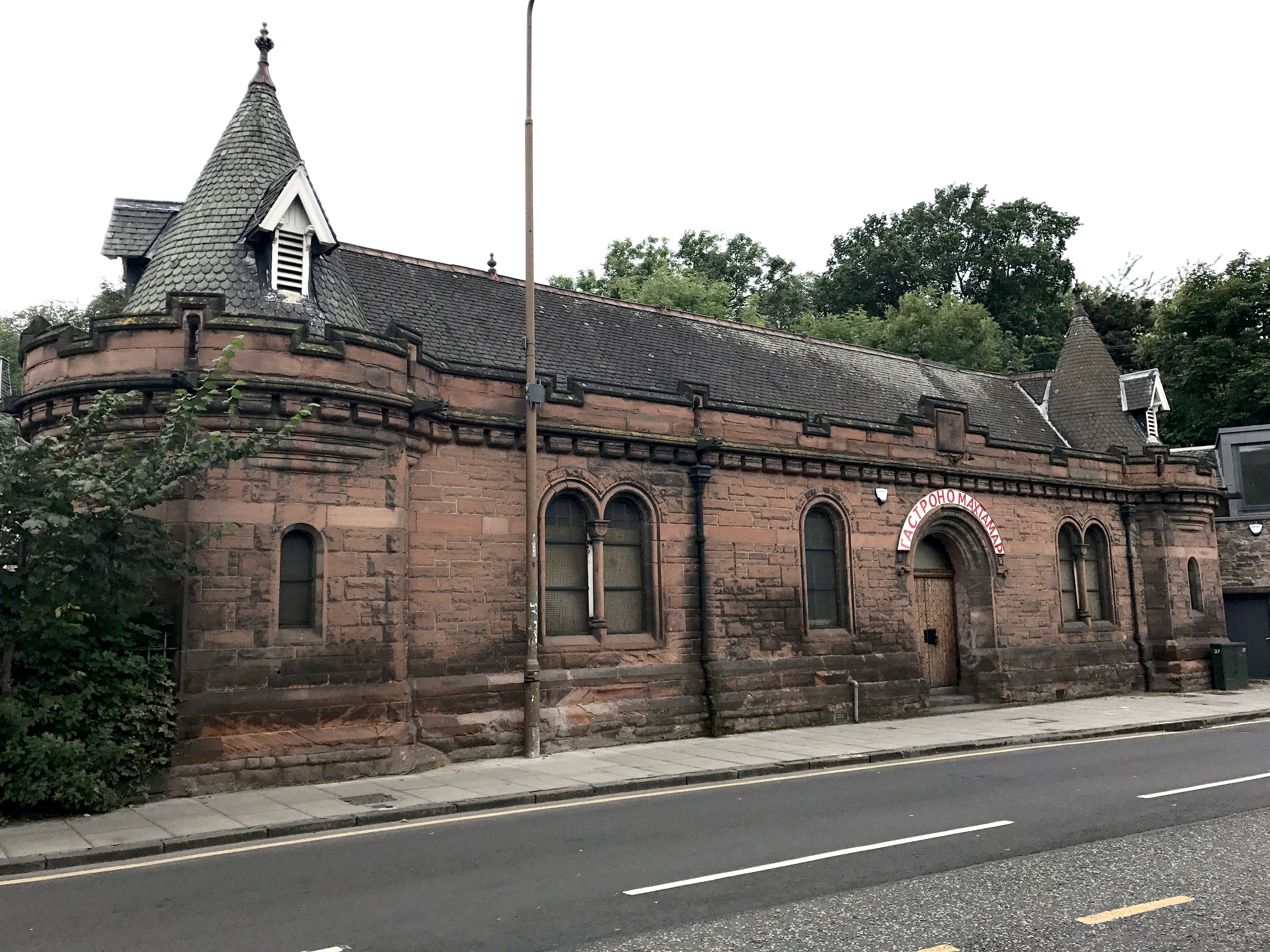
- 55 Abbeyhill in 2017.
- Interactive map of the 55 Abbeyhill area

General information
- Architectural style: Romanesque Revival
- Location: 55 Abbeyhill, Edinburgh, Scotland
- Coordinates: 55.954427°N 3.173667°W
- Grid reference: NT2340477211
- Opened: 1896
- Client: Edinburgh Corporation

Design and construction
- Architect: Robert Morham

Listed Building – Category B
- Official name: 55 Abbeyhill
- Designated: 29 September 2008
- Reference no.: LB51170

55 Abbeyhill is a former police station, religious hall, and restaurant in the Abbeyhill neighbourhood of Edinburgh in Scotland, United Kingdom.

== History ==
Designed by Robert Morham for the Edinburgh Corporation, the building opened in 1896. It is a single storey red sandstone building designed in an "unusual castellated Romanesque style" with "distinctive advanced finialled, conical-roofed fishscale slated corner turrets and deep corbelled and battlemented parapet" and "animal figure gargoyles". The building was utilised as a police station until at least 1932 (when police boxes were rolled out across the city, reducing the requirement for stations).

After ceasing to operate as a police station, the building was used for a period by the Edinburgh City Mission and by the United Pentecostal Church.

In 1979, the building became the "Armenian Community Culture Centre", also known as the "Aghtamar Lake Van Monastery in Exile". The building was operated as an Armenian restaurant, "Gastronom Aghtamar", offering multi-course Armenian banquets. It gained a degree of fame and notoriety for its unconventional business practices: the restaurant was only advertised by word of mouth, was challenging to book, and was lit only by candles. Described as "a real life Fawlty Towers, but with an Armenian twist", there are anecdotes of diners being compelled to participate in Armenian dancing tutorials, being asked to help wash dishes, and being abruptly ejected from the restaurant for perceived breaches of etiquette. The interior was decorated with Armenian art and Soviet propaganda. The Arts Review described it as "one of the most extraordinary eating places in Britain". The restaurant closed in 2010 following a burglary.

In February 2012, the building was added to the Buildings at Risk Register for Scotland. In November 2019, it was reported to be affected by rising damp. In June 2025, it was put on the market for offers over £500,000. In March 2026, an application for planning permission was submitted by McTaggart Properties Ltd., who proposed converting the building to a short-term rental with six double bedrooms, a library, a sauna and a hot tub, with works to include the addition of a glass tunnel linking the main building with an outbuilding; the application was withdrawn in April 2026.
