= Armenian Patriarchate =

Armenian Patriarchate may refer to:

- Armenian Catholic Patriarchate of Cilicia
- Armenian Patriarchate of Constantinople
- Armenian Patriarchate of Jerusalem

== See also ==
- List of Armenian Catholic Patriarchs of Cilicia
- List of Armenian Patriarchs of Constantinople
- List of Armenian Patriarchs of Jerusalem
