= Korchayk (province) =

Korchayk (Armenian: Կորճայք, Korčayk῾ — pronunciation: [koɹʧˈɑjkʰ] (Old Arm.), [koɾʧˈɑjkʰ] (East Arm.), [ɡoɾʤˈɑjkʰ] (West Arm.), also Korček῾) was one of the ashkhars (provinces) of Great Armenia, a mountainous region located in the south of the country.

== Description ==
Initially, the region occupied areas along the upper course of the Great Zab River and its tributaries, roughly corresponding to the modern Turkish province of Hakkâri. The origin of the province's name is the subject of various scientific theories and folk legends. In 1897, F. Andreas proposed a theory that the region was anciently inhabited by Kyrtians and derived the name from theirs (through the transformation Kyrtii—>Korti—>Korchi; korchayk or korchek in Armenian means Korchians, i.e., Kyrtians). This theory was supported in 1877 by K. Patkanov, who considered Korchayk the ancestral land of the Kurds, and N. Adontz. Hübschmann and Hewsen consider Andreas's version of the name originating from "Kurd-ayk" unlikely.

According to Iranologist Garnik Asatrian, the name traces back to the warlike Kyrtii people who inhabited the Korchayk province of historical Armenia. Over time, this name transferred to tribes speaking proto-Kurdish dialects who appeared in the area later. According to Armenian tradition, the name is based on the root "korch" (Armenian: կորճ), meaning "crooked," "uneven," or "winding". This characteristic directly describes the complex terrain, full of mountains, plains, deep gorges, canyons, and arid areas. It is suggested the region was originally called "Korch Hayk" (Armenian: Կորճ Հայք), meaning "uneven Armenia," and over time, through linguistic transformation and the dropping of the letter "h," the name fixed as "Korchayk". According to Armenian tradition, the name is based on the root "korch" (Armenian: կորճ), which translates as "crooked," "uneven," or "winding." This characteristic directly describes the complex relief of the terrain, which abounds in mountains, plains, deep gorges, canyons, and arid areas. It is suggested that the region was originally called "Korch Hayk" (Armenian: Կորճ Հայք), meaning "uneven, heterogeneous Armenia," and over time, as a result of linguistic transformation and the dropping of the letter "h," the name became established in the form "Korchayk"․

Later, the name "Korchayk" spread to more western regions up to the Tigris River and included the regions of Corduene. It was part of Great Armenia for about 250 years. Under the Arsacid rule in Armenia, Gordyene-Corduene-Korchayk was divided into 11 gavars (districts) and governed by a special military commander (bdeshkh).

=== Geography ===
The area of Korchayk was 14,707 km^{2} (5,678.4 sq mi). The 7th-century Armenian geographer Anania Shirakatsi describes the province as follows:

Korchayk, east of Mokk near Assyria, has 11 regions: 1. Korduk, 2. Upper Kordrik, 3. Middle Kordrik, 4. Lower Kordrik, 5. Aytuank, 6. Aigars, 7. Motogank, 8. Vorsirank, 9. Karatunis, 10. Chahuk, 11. Small Albak. It produces arsenic, and from fruits, shahendak. The 8th-century author Stepannos Syunetsi reports the existence of an Armenian language dialect in the region.

== History ==
The first detailed information about the region is provided by the ancient Greek historian Xenophon, whose descriptions indicate that in antiquity Korchayk was a highly developed country with prosperous agriculture, livestock breeding, and crafts. During the periods of Achaemenid, Seleucid, and Parthian rule, the region maintained its internal autonomy, and the power of these empires was more of a character of suzerainty. Nothing is known about the language and origin of the ancient inhabitants of this area. Apparently, by the middle of the 1st millennium AD, its population was Aramaized, while at the same time, Armenians must have settled there. These areas were first conquered by Armenia during the time of Tigranes the Great: their king Zarbien was subjugated by Tigranes in the early years of his reign, but, burdened by dependence, entered into relations with the Romans and was executed by the Armenian king.

After the defeat of Tigranes, the Parthian king Phraates III (ruled 70–57 BC) attempted to capture the area, but Pompey sent his legate Afranius, who took the area from the Parthians without a fight and returned it to Tigranes, who by that time had become a "friend and ally of the Roman people".

In the era of the Arsacid dynasty, Korchayk had the status of a bdeshkhdom, and its ruler, according to Agathangelos, was called the "Second Border Guard from the side of Assyria". In various years of the 1st–4th centuries AD, the region became an object of claims by neighboring states: in 36–37 AD, this area was captured by Adiabene, a semi-independent kingdom within Parthia. Later, it returned under the rule of Armenia. In 298–338 AD, it was occupied by the Romans. After the partition of Armenia in 387 AD, the region went to Persia and directly became part of the Sassanid Empire, where it was called Kardun.

In the 7th century, after the Arab conquest, Korchayk became a strategic bridgehead for the Caliphate for campaigns deep into Armenia and was included in the province of Jazira. In 852, the Vorsirank district became an arena of fierce resistance: at Lake Aryan, the troops of Vaspurakan gave a heroic rebuff to the army of the Arab commander Bugha, sent to suppress the national liberation uprising. In the 9th century, some northern parts of the province, including the fortresses of Alkekar, Jlmars, and Sring, became part of the holdings of the Artsruni dynasty.

With the beginning of the Seljuk invasions, nomadic Kurdish tribes began to predominate in the southern regions of the province. At the same time, the high mountain areas became a refuge for Assyrians fleeing the invasions of Tamerlane. After the establishment of Ottoman rule (according to the treaty of 1555), Korchayk was administratively divided: the main part became part of the Hakkari Sanjak of the Van Pashalik, and the Korduk district became part of the Diyarbekir Vilayet. The dramatic finale of the centuries-old history of the Armenian and Assyrian presence in the region came in 1915, when during the Genocide, the indigenous Christian population was destroyed or expelled, after which Korchayk became a predominantly Kurdish region.
