= Catholicosate of Aghtamar =

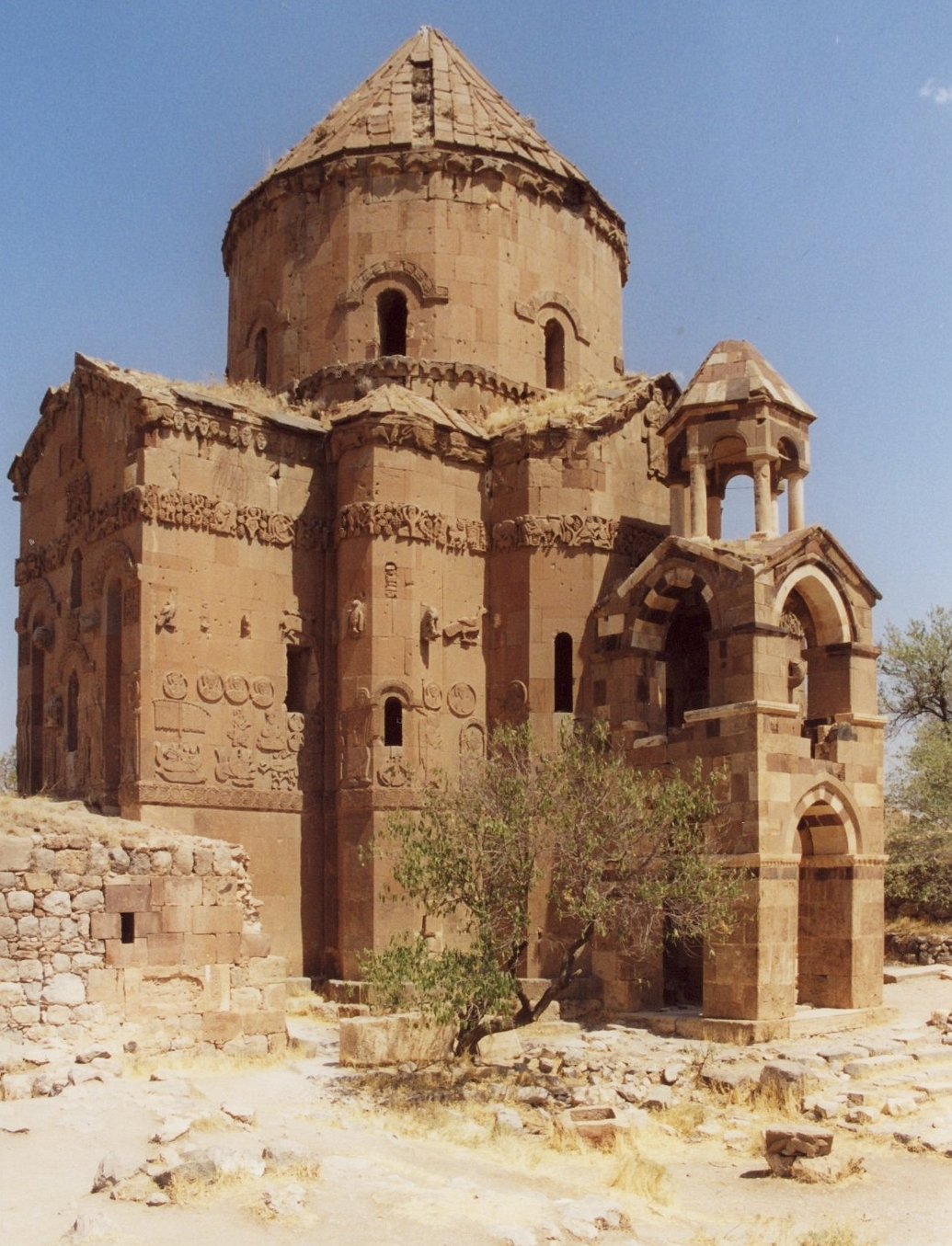
Akdamar church

Catholicosate of Aghtamar (Armenian: Աղթամարի կաթողիկոսութիւն, Aġt’amari kat’oġikosut’iun) was an independent see of the Armenian Apostolic Church that existed for almost eight centuries, from 1113 to 1895 and was based in the Cathedral of the Holy Cross on the Aghtamar Island (Turkish: Akdamar) near Van, in present-day Turkey.

The catholicosate was established by Archbishop Davit, who was related to the Artsrunis, the ruling dynasty of the independent Armenian Kingdom of Vaspurakan. Davit gave Catholicos Grigor III Pahlavuni's young age as the reason for the division. Archbishops related to the Artsruni family succeeded each other as Catholicos of Aghtamar until 1272, when the Sefedinian family took it over until the 16th century. Subsequently, the Catholicosate came under direct jurisdiction of the Mother See of Holy Etchmiadzin. By the late 19th century, the Catholicosate of Aghtamar ruled over the southern shores of Lake Van: Shatakh, Khizan, etc. The catholicosate was largely discredited and dissolved in 1895, amid the Hamidian massacres due to disputes with Etchmiadzin and corruption. The two dioceses that formed the catholicosate were transformed to the jurisdiction of the Armenian Patriarchate of Constantinople. The catholicosate remained vacant until the Armenian genocide and was formally abolished by the Turkish government in 1916.

== List of Catholicoi of Aghtamar ==
(List according to N. Akinyan. Armenian equivalent in parentheses)

- Davit I (Դավիթ Ա) (1113 – c. 1165)
- Stepanos I Aluz (Ստեփանոս Ա Ալուզ) (c. 1165 – c. 1185/90)
- Unnamed (c. 1185/90 - ????)
- Stepanos II Nkaren (Ստեփանոս Բ Նկարեն) (mentioned 1223 – died 1272)
- Stepanios III Tegha Sefitinyan (Ստեփանոս Գ Տղա Սեֆեդինյան) (1272 – c. 1296)
- Zacharia I Sefitinyan (Զաքարիա Ա Սեֆեդինյան) (1296 – 1336)
- Stepanos III Sefitinyan (Ստեփանոս Գ) (mentioned 1340 – died 1346)
- Davit II (Դավիթ Բ) (1346 – c. 1368)
  - Nerses Bolat as concurrent catholicos (Ներսես Բոլատ (1316, 1324, 1371)
- Zacharia II Nahatak (Martyr) (Զաքարիա Բ Նահատակ) (1369 – 1393)
- Davit III (Դավիթ Գ) (1393 – 1433)
- Zacharia III (Զաքարիա Գ) (1434 – 1464)
- Stepanos IV Tegha (Ստեփանոս Դ Տղա) (1465 – 1489)
- Zacharia IV (Զաքարիա Դ) (1489 – c. 1496)
- Atom (Ատոմ) (mentioned 1496, 1497, 1499, 1507)
- Hovhannes (Հովհաննես) (mentioned 1512)
- Grigoris I Metz (Senior) (Գրիգորիս Ա Աղթամարցի (Մեծ)) (c. 1512 – c. 1544)
- Grigoris II Sefitinyan Pokr (Junior) (Գրիգորիս Բ Սեֆեդինյան, Աղթամարցի (Փոքր)) (c. 1544 – c. 1586)
- Grigoris III Pokr (Junior) (Գրիգորիս Գ Փոքր) (mentioned 1595, 1602, 1604, 1605)
- Martiros Mokatsi or Martiros Gurji Peshruk (Մարտիրոս Մոկացի or Մարտիրոս Գուրջի Փշրուկ) (1660 – 1662)
- Petros I (Պետրոս Ա) (died 1670)
- Stepanos IV (Ստեփանոս Դ) (mentioned 1671)
- Philibbos I (Փիլիպպոս Ա) (mentioned 1671)
- Karapet I (Կարապետ Ա) (mentioned 1677)
- Hovhannes II Tutunji (Հովհաննես Բ Թութունջի) (mentioned 1679)
- Thovma I (Թովմա Ա) (1681 – 1698)
  - Avetis anti-catholicos (Ավետիս հակաթոռ կաթողիկոս) (mentioned 1698)
- Sahak I Artsketsi (Սահակ Ա Արծկեցի) (mentioned 1698)
- Hovhannes III Ketsuk) (Հովհաննես Գ Կեծուկ (mentioned 1699 – 1704)
- Hayrapet I Paykhetsi (Հայրապետ Ա Փայխեցի) (mentioned 1706)
- Grigor IV Gavashetsi (Գրիգոր Դ Գավաշեցի) (mentioned 1707, 1711)
- Hovhannes IV Hayotstsoretsi (Հովհաննես Դ Հայոցձորեցի (mentioned 1720)
- Grigor V Hizantsi (Գրիգոր Ե Հիզանցի) (mentioned 1725)
- Paghtasar I Paghishetsi (Բաղդասար Ա Բաղիշեցի) (mentioned 1735 – 1736)
- Nigoghayos I Spatakertsi (Նիկողայոս Ա Սպարկերտցի) (1736 – 1751)
- Grigor V (Գրիգոր Ե) (c. 1751 – 1761)
- Thovma II Aghtamartsi (Թովմա Բ Աղթամարցի) (c. 1761 – 1783)
- Karapet II Ghremfasments (Կարապետ Բ Ղռըմֆասմենց (1783 – 1787)
- Marcos I Shatakhetsi (Մարկոս Ա Շատախեցի) (1788 – 1791)
- Theodoros I (Թեոդորոս Ա) (mentioned 1792 – 1794)
- Michael I (Միքայել Ա) (mentioned 1796)
- Karapet II (Կարապետ Բ) (died c. 1813)
- Khachatur I Vanetsi (Խաչատուր Ա Վանեցի) (1813 – 1814)
- Karapet III (Կարապետ Գ) (died c. 1823)
- Harutiun I (Հարություն Ա) (died c. 1823)
- Hovhannes V Shatakhetsi) (Հովհաննես Ե Շատախեցի) (1823 – 1843)
- Khachatur II Mokatsi (Խաչատուր Բ Մոկացի) (c. 1844 – 1851)
- Gabriel I Shiroyan (Գաբրիել Ա Շիրոյան) (1851 – 1857)
- Petros II Byulyul (Պետրոս Բ Բյուլյուլ) (1858 – 1864)
- Khacatur III Shiroyan (Խաչատուր Գ Շիրոյան) (1864 – 1895)
