= Gevaş =

Gevaş Vostan • Ոստան
- District and municipality
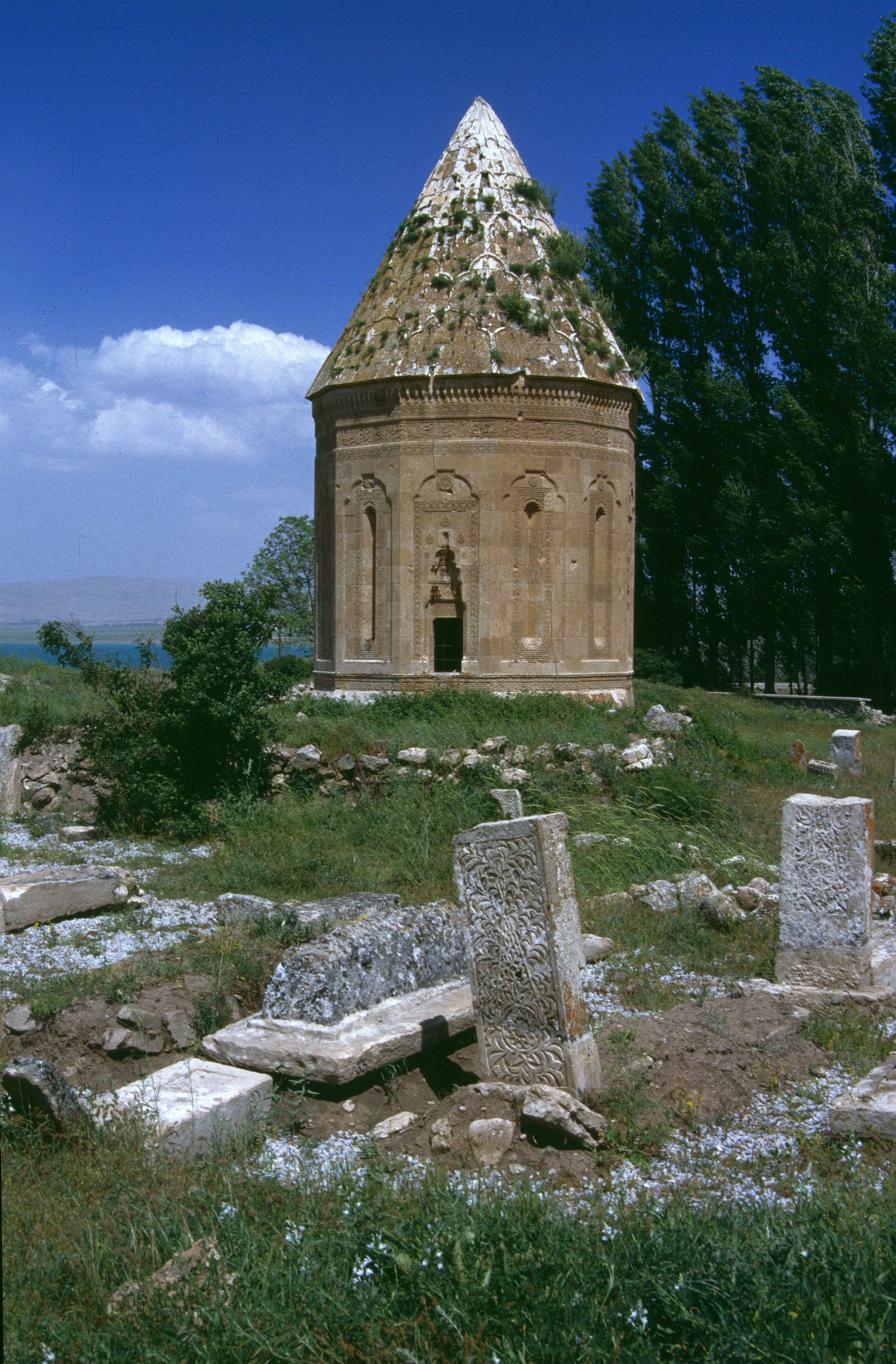
- Gevaş tomb

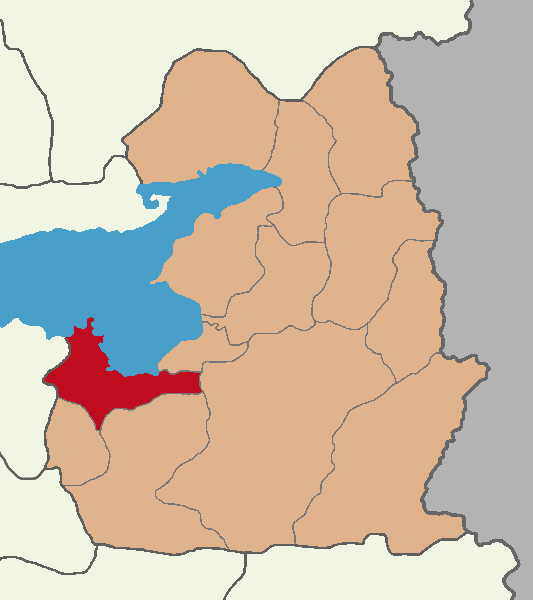
- Map showing Gevaş District in Van Province

- Location within Turkey
- Coordinates: 38°17′52″N 43°06′20″E
- Country: Turkey
- Province: Van

Government
  - Mayor: Murat Sezer (AKP)
- Area: 1,544 km^{2} (596 sq mi)
- Population (2022): 26,918
  - Density: 17.43/km^{2} (45.15/sq mi)
- Time zone: UTC+3 (TRT)
- Postal code: 65700
- Area code: 0432
- Website: www.gevas.bel.tr

Gevaş (Armenian: Ոստան, romanized: Vostan, lit. '[princely] court'; Kurdish: Westan) is a municipality and district of Van Province, Turkey. Its area is 1,544 km^{2}, and its population is 26,918 (2022). In the last elections of March 2019, Murat Sezer from the Justice and Development Party (AKP) was elected Mayor. As Kaymakam, Hamit Genç was appointed by President Recep Tayyip Erdoĝan in July 2019.

The municipality is populated by Kurds.

== History ==
Historically, Gevaş was for some time the main town of the Armenian kingdom of Vaspurakan and later between the 14th and 15th centuries the centre of a small Kurdish emirate. In their time the settlement had moved nearer to the lake.

Main sights include surviving ruins of the castle, the monumental tomb known as Halime Hatun Kümbeti, built in 1358, very likely for the daughter of a local emir, a mosque built before 1446 (restoration in that year), the tomb of Sheikh Ibrahim, father of Halime Hatun as well as the ruins of an Armenian church in Ili, probably built after 941 and an Armenian Church/monastery on Kuş Island west of Aghtamar Island.

== Composition ==
There are 42 neighbourhoods in Gevaş District:

- Abalı
- Akdamar
- Aladüz
- Altınsaç
- Anaköy
- Atalan
- Aydınocak
- Bağlama
- Bahçelievler
- Barışık
- Dağyöre
- Daldere
- Değirmitaş
- Dereağzı
- Dilmetaş
- Dokuzağaç
- Elmalı
- Göründü
- Gündoğan
- Güzelkonak
- Hasbey
- Hişet
- İkizler
- İnköy
- Karşıyaka
- Kayalar
- Kazanç
- Kızıltaş
- Koçak
- Kurultu
- Kuşluk
- Orta
- Pınarbaşı
- Selimiye
- Timar
- Töreli
- Uğurveren
- Uysal
- Yanıkçay
- Yemişlik
- Yoldöndü
- Yuva
