= Armenians in the Crusading movement =

Role of the Armenians in the Crusades

Exposed to depredations by their Turkoman neighbours, the Armenians of the Middle East tended to cooperate with western European crusaders from the beginning of the crusading movement in the late eleventh century.

== Background ==
The Armenians were first mentioned by the Greek geographer Hecataeus of Miletus in c. 550 BC, at which time they inhabited the wider region of the headwaters of the Tigris and Euphrates rivers. From the first century BC this area was known as Greater Armenia, and subsequently became a contested frontier between the Roman Empire and successive Persian powers. Tradition attributes the Armenians' conversion to Christianity to Gregory the Illuminator who persuaded King Tiridates III, c. 300 AD, to proclaim Christianity the state religion. The Armenian Church was initially subject to the episcopal see of Caesarea within the Roman Empire, but by the end of the fourth century it had come under the leadership of its own supreme prelates, styled catholicoi. By at least the fifth century, Armenian pilgrims were regularly visiting Jerusalem, leaving inscriptions concentrated in particular around the Church of St James.

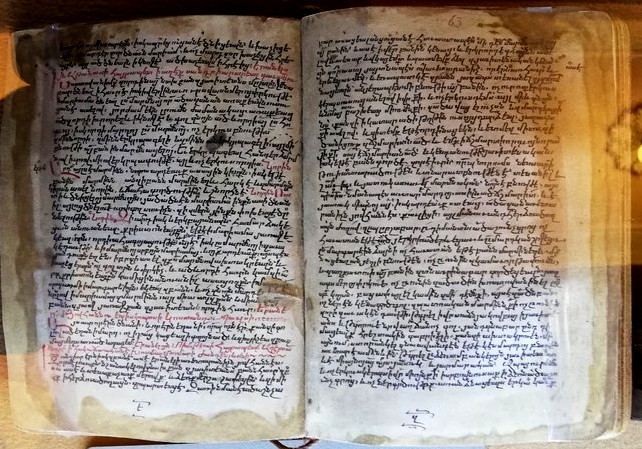
A page from a 15th-century Armenian manuscript with refutations of the decisions of the Council of Chalcedon

The theological divergence between mainstream imperial Christianity and the Armenian Church crystallised after the Council of Chalcedon (451), which, in the absence of Armenian representatives, affirmed that Christ existed as one person in two natures. The Armenian Church, by contrast, adhered to the teaching of Cyril of Alexandria on the "one incarnate nature of the Word". Unlike the anti-Chalcedonian Syriac (Jacobite) Church, the Armenians did not deny Christ's humanity and therefore declined communion with them; nevertheless, their rejection of Chalcedonian doctrine rendered them heretical in the eyes of imperial Christianity.

After 428, Armenia lost its independence and was partitioned between the Eastern Roman (Byzantine) Empire and Sassanid Persia, while remaining largely administered by the native aristocracy, notably the Bagratids. By 661, much of the country was brought under the control of the expanding Islamic Caliphate. Islamic expansion was driven in large part by the concept of jihad, understood a divinely sanctioned struggle aimed at the propagation of belief in God. The successors of the Islamic prophet Muhammad, as leaders of the Muslim community, adopted the title of caliph, a term also attested in the Quran, Islam's most sacred text.

Following 693, Greater Armenia came under the direct rule of the Umayyad Caliphate, administered by Muhammad ibn Marwan, whose governorship was marked by the suppression of the Armenian clergy and nobility. Armenian cooperation with the caliphal authorities nevertheless became a strategic necessity in the face of incursions from north of the Caliphate, leading to the restoration of Armenian autonomy under the Bagratid house in 732. After the fall of the Umayyads, the Abbasid Caliphate sought to incorporate Armenia more fully into its imperial structure, though Armenian resistance persisted. During the reign of Basil I, the Byzantine Empire pursued an assertive policy against the Abbasids, compelling Caliph al-Mu'tamid to consent to the coronation of the Bagratid prince Ashot I as king in 885. In the early eleventh century, Bagratid Armenia became a vassal state of the Byzantine Empire, and its last king, Gagik II, was compelled to abdicate in return for estates in Byzantine Cappadocia in 1042.

Armenian migration into the Byzantine Empire began in the sixth century, and Armenian cavalrymen were regularly recruited into the imperial army, some rising to prominence, notably the general Narses and the emperor Leo V. Alongside settlement in Cappadocia, imperial authorities relocated large Armenian populations to Byzantine Cilicia, where they were governed by Armenian nobles such as Oshin of Lampron. From the mid-eleventh century, Greater Armenia was repeatedly subjected to Turkoman raids. These nomadic groups, displaced from Central Asia by renewed climatic cooling, acknowledged the tenuous overlordship of the Seljuk clan. The incursions of the 1060s were especially destructive, marked by widespread massacres and the devastation of cities, monasteries, and churches. These incursions triggered fresh Armenian migrations southwards into Syria and Cilicia.

== Prelude to the First Crusade ==
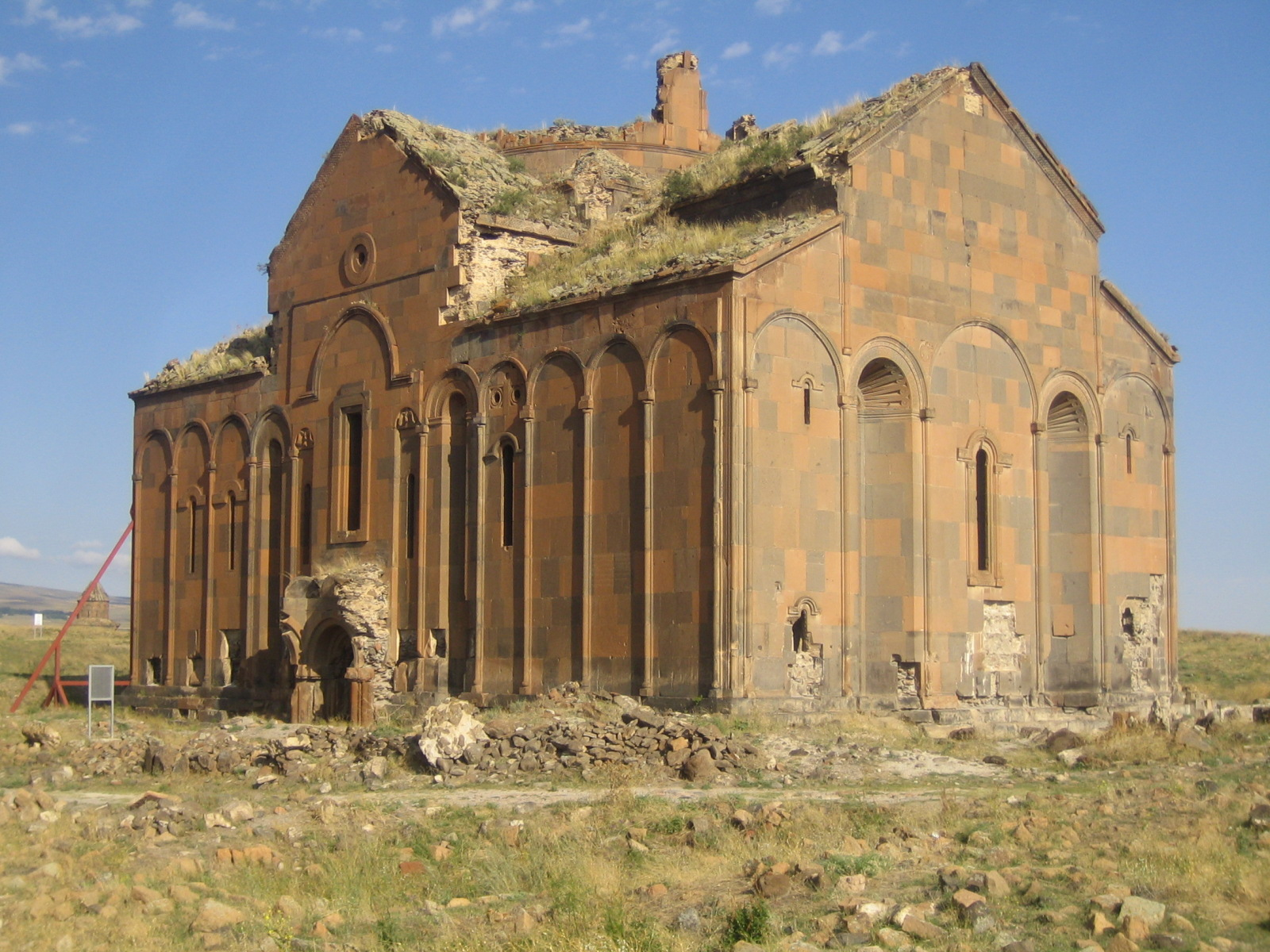
Ruins of the Cathedral of Ani, built in the capital of Bagratid Armenia between 989 and 1001/1010

On 26 August 1071, the Seljuk sultan Alp Arslan defeated the Byzantine imperial army at the Battle of Manzikert. Although he soon redirected his attention towards Syria, numerous Turkoman warriors instead turned against Byzantine territories in Anatolia, Syria, and Cilicia. There they began to found new polities, including the Sultanate of Rum, ruled by a secessionist Seljuk prince, and the realm of the Danishmendids. In the borderlands, Christian communities sought protection from warlords and mercenaries. Among them, the Armenian Philaretos, a former Byzantine general, rose to prominence, securing the allegiance of other Armenian lords as well as western mercenaries; he died in 1086 or 1087. The historian of religion, Christopher MacEvitt says that Philaretos's rule "not only foreshadowed the success of the crusaders but also facilitated it": the natives adopted a "frontier mentality" in which political and military authority were vested in warlords with little claim to legitimacy beyond coercive force. Following his death, a power vacuum emerged in which smaller polities took shape: the Chalcedonian Christian Thoros ruled in the city of Edessa, his son-in-law, the Armenian Gabriel, in Melitene, while the fortresses of Gargar, al-Bira, and Kesun were held by Armenian lords—Constantine, Albgharib, and Kogh Vasil respectively. Meanwhile, in Cilicia, the anti-Byzantine Armenian nobleman Ruben I and his son Constantine I began to expand their power by seizing strategic fortresses, including Vahka.

Contacts between Armenians and Western Europeans were minimal. Armenian scholars referred only sporadically to the peoples of the West, notwithstanding the presence of western ("Frankish") mercenaries in the Byzantine army. In MacEvitt's view, a letter from Pope Gregory VII to the Armenian archbishop of Sivas suggests that papal correspondence with the Armenian Church was a novelty and that Gregory's knowledge of Armenian theology was limited. Gregory's pontificate represented the high point of what is conventionally termed the Gregorian Reform, a programme of ecclesiastical renewal in the west. Its proponents aimed to free the Church from lay control and to place Christendom under the supreme authority of the papacy. The program brought about conflicts between the papacy and both church leaders and secular rulers. The bishops of Rome, regarded as successors of Peter the Apostle, enjoyed particular honour, but their claim to universal supremacy was rejected by the senior eastern bishops, especially the Byzantine patriarch of Constantinople. In 1054, mutual excommunications formalised a schism between the papacy and the eastern patriarchates, though they did not in themselves terminate communion between the Western (Catholic) and Eastern (Orthodox) branches of Chalcedonian Christianity.

In 1074, Pope Gregory VII mentioned both the Byzantines and the Armenians in a letter to Emperor Henry IV, outlining his intention to lead a military expedition for the protection of eastern Christians. The historian Jacob G. Ghazarian suggests, on the basis of primary sources, that the Armenian catholicos Gregory II may have been present in Rome at this time, which may explain Gregory's reference to the Armenians. Gregory's plan was fuelled by the Turkomans' advance after the Battle of Manzikert, but it proved abortive. Gregory's determination to end royal investiture in bishoprics and abbeys precipitated the Investiture Controversy, a major conflict with Emperor Henry IV. The papacy had already mobilised armed force against secular opponents and non-Christian powers by offering spiritual incentives, and the Controversy accelerated the development of the Catholic conception of just war. By c. 1095, the theologian and bishop Bonizo of Sutri, in his Liber de Vita Christiana, commended those who fought schismatics, heretics, and the excommunicate "for their salvation and the common good".

== First Crusade ==
In March 1095, envoys of the Byzantine emperor Alexios I Komnenos approached Pope Gregory VII's successor, Urban II, at the Council of Piacenza, requesting papal assistance in recruiting forces against their "pagan" enemies. After the council, Urban toured France, holding assemblies, and negotiating with local prelates and aristocrats. On 27 November 1095, at the Council of Clermont, he proclaimed a military expedition in aid of the eastern Christians and promised spiritual rewards to its participants. Bishop Adhemar of Le Puy was the first to "take the cross", sewing a cloth cross onto his garment as a visible sign of commitment, thereby establishing a precedent for the crusading vow. Urban set 15 August 1096 as the official date of departure, but from March that year several crusading groups—some numbering over 10,000 people of diverse backgrounds—set out in advance. Many of these bands were destroyed for their depredations while still in Europe, and those who reached Anatolia were annihilated by Kilij Arslan I, sultan of Rūm, at the Battle of Civetot in October. The main crusading armies departed after the harvest, in August 1096, under the leadership of major aristocrats such as Godfrey of Bouillon, Raymond of Saint-Gilles, and Bohemond of Taranto. Most reached Constantinople before the end of 1096, where Emperor Alexios secured from all the leaders except Raymond an oath to restore to Byzantium territories taken by the Turkomans.

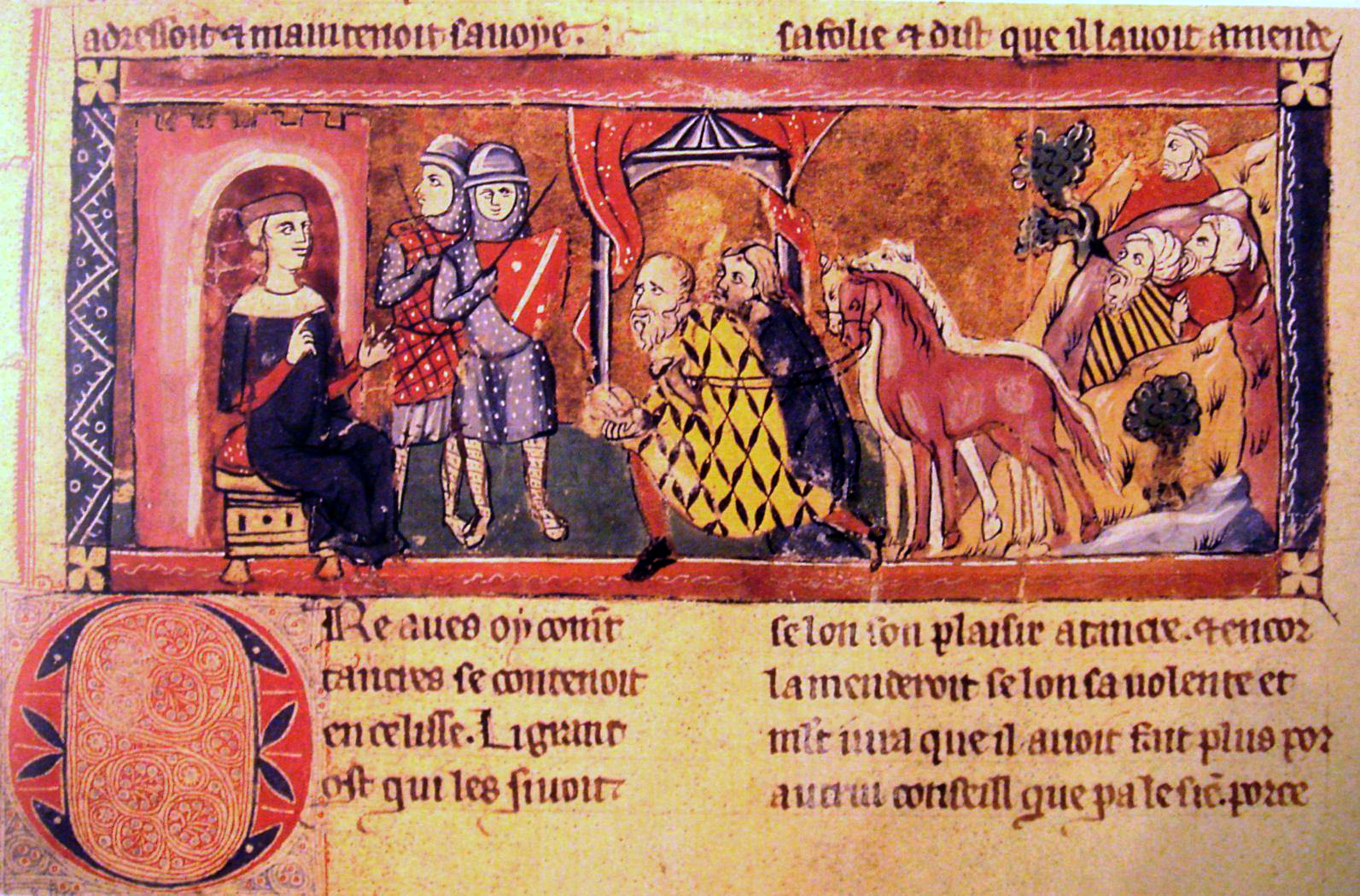
The Italo-Norman crusader Tancred receives Cilician envoys during the First Crusade.

The earliest recorded contact between the crusaders and the Armenians occurred during the siege of Nicaea, a major operation jointly undertaken by the crusaders and the Byzantines. On that occasion, Godfrey's brother, Baldwin of Boulogne, befriended Bagrat, the brother of Kogh Vasil. After the coalition captured Nicaea and the crusaders defeated the Turkomans at the Battle of Dorylaeum, the main crusader army set out across Cappadocia on a route of more than 600 kilometres towards Antioch. To the crusaders, the region was known as terra Hermeniorum ("the land of the Armenians"). The historian John France argues that this "Armenian strategy" was intended to exploit the hostility of local Armenian lords towards their Turkoman neighbours. In mid-September 1097, Bohemond's nephew Tancred led a contingent into Cilicia, and was soon followed by Baldwin. Despite their rivalry, they expelled Turkoman garrisons from Tarsus, Adana, and Mamistra, and established contact with Oshin of Lampron and Constantine of Vahka, both seeking advantage of the crusaders' presence.

Soon after rejoining the main army in September 1097, Baldwin undertook, at Bagrat's urging, an expedition against Turbessel, a fortress between Antioch and Edessa on the fringes of the domains of Ridwan, the Seljuk ruler of Aleppo. By the time his force of no more than 100 knights arrived, local Armenians had expelled the Turkoman garrison and accepted him as ruler. Similarly, with Armenian support, he also seized nearby Ravendel, but soon detained Bagrat after two Armenian lords, Fer and Nicusus, accused him of conspiring with the Turkomans. MacEvitt argues that the episode shows that "local Christian leaders saw each other as the real threat". In February 1098, Thoros of Edessa sought Baldwin's assistance. Baldwin entered the city with 200 troops, including 60–80 Franks, refused mercenary status, and secured appointment as co-ruler. Thoros, an Orthodox Christian and representative of Byzantine authority, remained unpopular among his Armenian and Syriac subjects. In early March, he and his family were killed in a popular uprising, and Baldwin was proclaimed ruler, establishing the County of Edessa, the first Crusader state. The historian Christopher Tyerman compares his position, as "commander of an alien elite military corps", to that of the region's Turkoman rulers.

By the time Baldwin seized Edessa, the main crusader army was already besieging Antioch. During the lengthy siege, Baldwin and his Armenian allies supplied the crusaders with provisions. In May 1098, the Seljuk general Kerbogha advanced to relieve Antioch, but first halted before Edessa; his three-week siege failed. When his vanguard reached Antioch on 4 June, the crusaders had already captured the city, after Bohemond of Taranto bribed an Armenian tower guard, and by month's end they decisively defeated Kerbogha. To consolidate his position, Baldwin married the unnamed daughter of an Armenian lord whom Albert of Aachen calls Taphnuz. The growing influx of Frankish soldiers into Edessa prompted some of the city's Armenian leaders to conspire against Baldwin, but he had them imprisoned and mutilated in accordance with Byzantine custom. Taphnuz likewise fled Edessa, fearing Baldwin's vengeance for his failure to pay his daughter's dowry.

Despite the Byzantine claim to Antioch, Bohemond assumed full control of the city and established the second Crusader state, the Principality of Antioch. The main army continued the crusade and captured Jerusalem on 15 July 1099. There, the crusader leaders elected Godfrey of Bouillon as the city's first Frankish ruler, although he was not crowned king.

== Cooperation and resistance ==
=== Consolidation of the Crusaders states ===
Godfrey of Bouillon died of illness on 18 July 1100. His retainers secured Jerusalem for Baldwin I of Edessa, who in turn ceded his county to his cousin, Baldwin of Le Bourcq. MacEvitt observes that Baldwin II thereby "inherited small pockets of territory surrounded by lands ruled by autonomous warlords, either Armenian or Turkish". Baldwin II married Morphia, the daughter of Gabriel of Melitene and sister of the wife of Thoros of Edessa. This marital alliance secured Frankish support for Gabriel against the Danishmendids and consolidated Baldwin's authority among his Armenian subjects. His daughter's marriage to Baldwin II did not save Gabriel of Melitene who was killed when the Danishmendids captured his lordship in 1101. In 1103 or 1104, Parsegh Pahlavuni, the Armenian bishop of Ani and coadjutor (assistant) to his uncle, Catholicos Gregory, left his ruined see for Edessa, where Baldwin granted him several villages.

Under Baldwin, further Armenian lordships were seized by Frankish lords. Thatoul of Marash repelled an attack by Bohemond I of Antioch, but in 1105 or 1106 sold his lordship to Baldwin II's cousin, Joscelin of Courtenay, and withdrew to Constantinople. Kogh Vasil assumed the role of protector of the Armenian Church, sheltering Catholicos Gregory and, after Gregory's death, persuading his successor, Parsegh, to leave Edessa for Kesun. After Bohemond was captured by Danishmendid forces, Kogh Vasil contributed to his ransom, despite the reluctance of Tancred—who governed Antioch on Bohemond's behalf—to secure his release. In 1108, when Tancred, again acting as regent for the absent Bohemond, sought to extend his authority over Edessa, Kogh Vasil allied himself with Baldwin II. Kogh Vasil's successor, Vasil Dgha, was unable to withstand Baldwin II's attacks and was forced to relinquish his lordship and retire to Constantinople. During the conflict, Constantine I of Cilicia supported the Franks. Waleran of Le Puiset, another cousin of Baldwin II, married Albgharib's daughter in order to acquire his lordship of al-Bira in 1116. Around the same time, Constantine of Gargar died in Frankish captivity. His son, Michael, continued to rule Gargar until Turkoman attacks forced him to surrender it in exchange for Dülük, in the County of Edessa. Another Armenian aristocrat, Vasil, subsequently purchased Gargar from Joscelin, then count of Edessa. The marriages of Baldwin II, Joscelin of Courtenay, and Waleran of Le Puiset indicate, in MacEvitt's words, that "the Franks of Edessa perceived Armenian families as an avenue to bolster their own political standing". By contrast, Baldwin I, by then king of Jerusalem, repudiated his Armenian wife, who was said to have been raped by Muslim pirates during her journey to Jerusalem. She was compelled to enter the Convent of Saint Anne in Jerusalem, which received substantial funds for accommodating her.

On the Cilician coast, the Armenians rose against harsh Frankish rule after a coalition of Turkoman rulers defeated the combined armies of Antioch and Edessa at the Battle of Harran in 1104. The region was subsequently seized by the Byzantines, but in 1106 and 1107 Tancred captured Mamistra and other Cilician settlements with the support of a Genoese fleet. He made Antioch the leading Frankish power in northern Syria, although Baldwin I prevented him from extending his authority over Edessa. After Tancred’s death in 1112, he was succeeded by his nephew Roger.

=== New Muslim powers ===
Baldwin I of Jerusalem died of illness on 2 April 1118. Baldwin II of Edessa was elected as his successor and crowned king on 14 April. He soon faced an invasion by Toghtekin, the Turkoman ruler of Damascus. In late summer, Tancred of Antioch captured the fortress of Azaz with the assistance of Leo, son of Constantine I of Cilicia. The Frankish possession of Azaz posed a direct threat to the Muslim city of Aleppo, prompting its inhabitants to seek assistance from the Turkoman warlord Ilghazi. He invaded the territory of Antioch and virtually destroyed Roger's army at the Battle of the Field of Blood on 28 June 1119. Roger was killed on the battlefield, and Antioch was preserved through the intervention of Baldwin II, who assumed the regency on behalf of Bohemond I's absent son, Bohemond II. The historian Nicholas Morton observes that the absence of anti-Frankish rebellion in Cilicia following Roger's defeat is "a point which speaks of a strong synergy between the Frankish rulers, their Armenian subjects, and their Roupenid allies" (that is Constanine and his sons).

Baldwin II invested Joscelin of Courtenay with the County of Edessa in September 1119. An Armenian inscription at the city's East Gate, dated to 1122, refers to an Armenian terapahutuin ('guardian') named Vasil, suggesting that under Joscelin I the local Armenian population retained considerable political influence in the county's capital. By contrast, the Armenians of Cilicia remained militarily weak, and the rulers of the Crusader states therefore continued to depend on military assistance from Western Europe. In the early 1120s, Joscelin pursued an expansionist policy, while Baldwin concentrated on the defence of Antioch, a divergence that caused considerable discontent among the Frankish elite of Jerusalem.

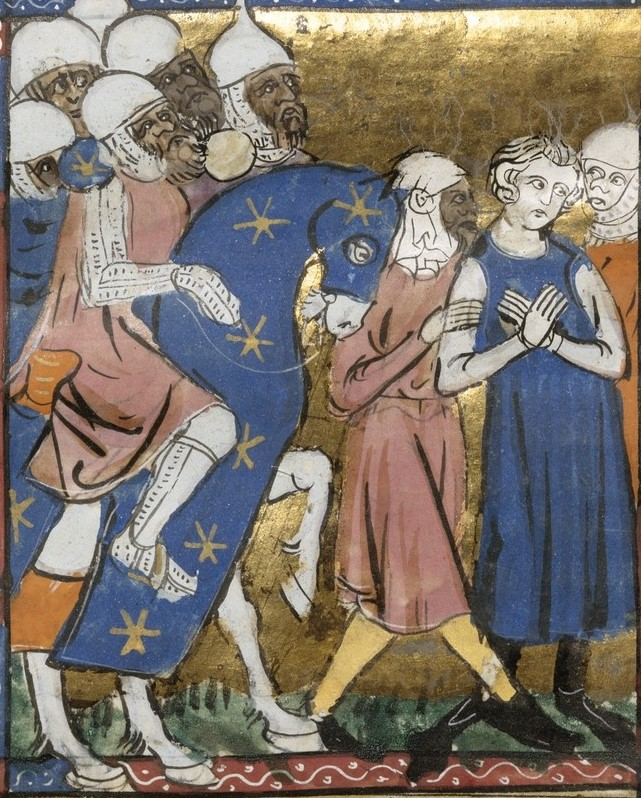
Baldwin II of Jerusalem is captured.

In September 1122, Joscelin was captured near Saruj by Belek of Harput, the town's former Muslim ruler. Baldwin attacked Belek, but in April 1123 was himself captured. A band of fifteen Armenians from Behesni then seized Harput, where Joscelin and Baldwin were imprisoned. It is uncertain whether the Armenians were motivated by prospects of material gain, allegiance to Joscelin, or hostility towards Belek. Joscelin escaped to seek reinforcements in Antioch and Jerusalem, while Baldwin remained with the Armenians to defend Harput. Belek soon retook it, massacred the Armenian defenders, and transferred Baldwin to Harran. Baldwin was eventually ransomed by his subjects from Timurtash, Belek's successor, after Belek was killed in battle against the Franks. Baldwin soon attacked Aleppo, prompting its inhabitants to accept Aqsunqur, the Seljuk governor of Mosul as their ruler, thereby bringing Aleppo and Mosul under the same rule until he was murdered by the Assassins in 1126.

Bohemond II assumed authority in Antioch in October 1126. He soon came into conflict with Joscelin I after unsuccessfully demanding his submission. Morton argues that this dispute "may provide a clue as to the collapse" of cordial relations between the Franks of Antioch and the Roupenids, Joscelin's in-laws. In 1130, Bohemond advanced against the Roupenid stronghold of Anavarza in Cilicia, but his army was ambushed by Danishmendid forces and Bohemond was killed. Meanwhile, in 1128, Zengi, the Seljuk ruler of Mosul, seized Aleppo, thereby uniting the two lordships under his authority; this concentration of power made further Frankish attempts from Antioch or Edessa to capture the city far more difficult.

Bohemond was succeeded by his under-age daughter, Constance, whose maternal grandfather, Baldwin II, assumed the regency despite the opposition of his widowed daughter, Alice. Baldwin died of illness in 1131, leaving the Kingdom of Jerusalem to his daughter Melisende, her French husband, Fulk of Anjou, and their son, Baldwin III. Leo of the Roupenids subsequently attacked the Antiochene territories in Cilicia, capturing Mamistra, Tarsus, and Adana; however, an invasion by the Danishmendids compelled him to pay tribute. Although gravely ill, Joscelin led the Edessan army against a hostile force while being carried on a litter, and died after the raiders withdrew at the sight of the ailing count being carried into battle. He was succeeded by his son, Joscelin II of Courtenay. The early years of Fulk's reign were marked by conflicts with his vassals and the rulers of the northern Crusader states. He overcame his opponents and secured the regency of Antioch for Constance against her mother, Alice. His reconciliation with Pons of Tripoli was reinforced by the marriage of his sister-in-law Hodierna to Pons's heir, Raymond. By the 1160s, through the dynastic marriages of her three daughters — Melisende, Alice and Hodierna — the descendants of the Armenian Morphia of Melitene ruled all the Crusader states.

== Bibliography ==
- Boase, T. S. R. (1978). "The History of the Kingdom". In Boase, T. S. R. (ed.). The Cilician Kingdom of Armenia. Scottish Academic Press. pp. 1–33. SBN 7073-0145-9.
- Bowden, John (2007). A Chronology of World Christianity. Continuum. ISBN 978-0-8264-9633-1.
- Donner, Fred M. (1999). "Muhammad and the Caliphate: Political History of the Islamic Empire up to the Mongol Conquest". In Esposito, John L. (ed.). The Oxford History of Islam. Oxford University Press. pp. 1–61. ISBN 978-0-19-510799-9.
- Ellenblum, Ronnie (2012). The Collapse of the Eastern Mediterranean: Climate Change and the Decline of the East, 950–1072. Cambridge University Press. ISBN 978-1-1070-2335-2.
- France, John (1996) [1994]. Victory in the East: A Military History of the First Crusade. Cambridge University Press. ISBN 978-0-521-41969-7.
- Ghazarian, Jacob G. (2005) [2000]. The Armenian Kingdom of Cilicia during the Crusades: The Integration of Cilician Armenians with the Latins, 1080–1393. Routledge. ISBN 978-0-7007-1418-6.
- Hodgson, Natasha R. (2017) [2007]. Women, Crusading and the Holy Land in Historical Narrative. Warfare in History. The Boydell Press. ISBN 978-1-78327-270-9.
- Jotischky, Andrew (2017) [2004]. Crusading and the Crusader States (Second ed.). Routledge. ISBN 978-1-1388-0806-5.
- Lock, Peter (2006). The Routledge Companion to the Crusades. Routledge Companion to History. Routledge. ISBN 978-0-4153-9312-6.
- MacEvitt, Christopher (2008). The Crusades and the Christian World of the East: Rough Tolerance. The Middle Ages. University of Pennsylvania Press. ISBN 978-0-8122-2083-4.
- Morton, Nicholas (2020). The Crusader States and their Neighbours: A Military History, 1099–1187. Oxford University Press. ISBN 978-0-19-882454-1.
- Papadakis, Aristeides (1994). The Christian East and the Rise of the Papacy. The Church in History. Vol. IV. St Vladimir's Seminary Press. ISBN 978-0-88141-057-0.
- Tyerman, Christopher (2007) [2006]. God's War: A History of the Crusades. Penguin Books. ISBN 978-0-1402-6980-2.
- Tyerman, Christopher (2019). The World of the Crusades: An Illustrated History. Yale University Press. ISBN 978-0-3002-1739-1.
