= Nerses IV the Gracious =

Catholicos of Armenia from 1166 to 1173

Saint Nerses IV the Gracious Սուրբ Ներսէս Դ. Կլայեցի (Շնորհալի)
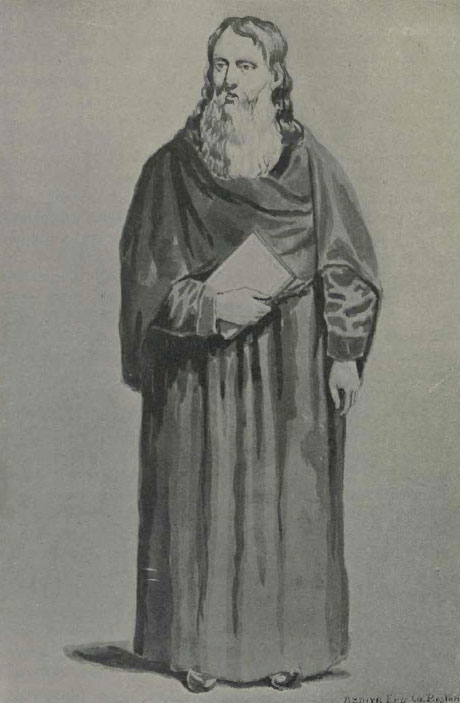
- Illustration of Nerses IV the Gracious in the 1898 book Illustrated Armenia and Armenians
- Born: 1102
- Died: 13 August 1173 (aged 70 or 71)
- Venerated in: Armenian Orthodox Church; Latin Church; Armenian Catholic Church
- Feast: Saturday of the Fourth Week of the Holy Cross (mid-October) (Armenian Apostolic Church); 13 August (Latin Church)
- Installed: 1166
- Term ended: 13 August 1173
- Predecessor: Gregory III of Cilicia
- Successor: Gregory IV the Young

Nerses IV the Gracious (Armenian: Սուրբ Ներսէս Դ. Կլայեցի (Շնորհալի); also Nerses Shnorhali, Nerses of Kla or Saint Nerses the Graceful; 1102 – 13 August 1173) was Catholicos of Armenia from 1166 to 1173.

During his time as a bishop and, later, as Catholicos of the Armenian Church, Nerses worked to bring about reconciliation with the Eastern Orthodox Church and convened a council with emissaries selected by the Byzantine emperor himself to discuss how they might be able to reunite the two churches. The terms the emperor offered were, however, unacceptable to both Nerses and the Armenian Church, and the negotiations collapsed.

Nerses is remembered as a theologian, poet, writer and hymn composer. He has been called "the Fénelon of Armenia" for his efforts to draw the Armenian church out of isolation, and has been recognized as a saint by the Roman Rite of the Catholic Church, which holds his feast on 13 August, and by the Armenian Apostolic Church and Armenian Catholic Church, who celebrate him on the Saturday of the Fourth Week of the Holy Cross in October.

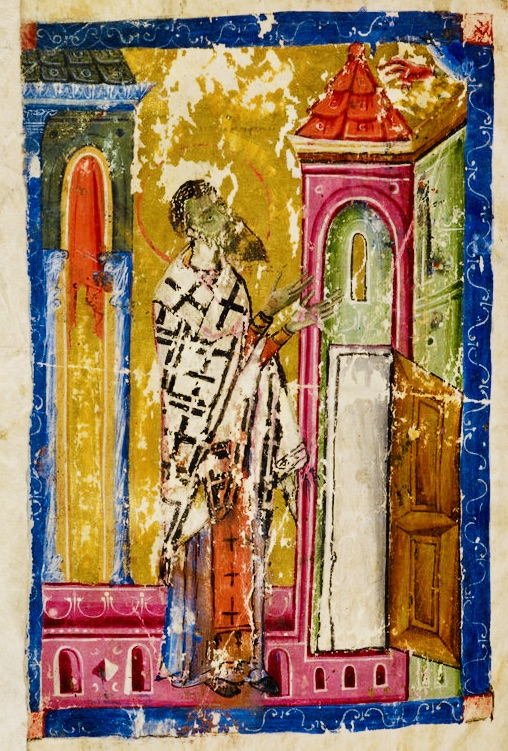
Portrait of Saint Nerses from 1269 breviary by Stepannos Vahkatsi

== Biography ==
=== Early life ===
Nerses was born in approximately 1100 into the noble Pahlavuni family. Nerses was the name he adopted upon ordination as a priest; his birth name is unknown. He was the son of Apirat Pahlavuni and the great-grandson of the writer and prince Grigor Magistros. According to some sources, he was born in the castle of Dzovk in the province of Tluk in Cilicia, located southwest of Aintab in the domain of the Armenian warlord Gogh Vasil. However, other sources claim that Nerses was born in his family's fortress, also called Dzovk, in the historical province of Sophene in Armenia, near modern-day Elazığ. Nerses moved to Dzovk in Cilicia, named after their original home, with his brother, the future Catholicos Gregory III, after the death of their father in 1111. After the early death of his father, Nerses and his older brother Gregory were placed under the guardianship of their maternal granduncle, Catholicos Gregory II the Martyrophile, who placed them in the Karmir Vank (Red Monastery) of Shughr in the mountains of southeastern Cilicia. Later, Gregory's successor Basil of Ani (a cousin of Nerses) placed them under the tutelage of the monk Stepanos Manouk, a highly regarded scholar and theologian. Nerses' epithet Shnorhali, which may be translated as 'graceful' or 'full of grace', appears to have been an honorary title given to the graduates of Karmir Vank, although others have suggested that he received this title for the grace of his person, speech and written works or because of the irenic quality of his writing.

Members of the Pahlavuni family held the office of Armenian catholicos from 1066 to 1203. The Pahlavunis worked to maintain their family's control over the catholicosate. After Basil of Ani's death in 1113, Nerses' brother Gregory became catholicos at the age of 18. Nerses himself was ordained to be a celibate priest by his brother at the age of 17 and was consecrated a bishop at the age of 35.

=== The Epithet "Shnorhali" ===
The epithet Shnorhali (Classical Armenian: Շնորհալի), meaning "gracious" or "eloquent", frequently appears in medieval manuscripts and commemorative records. It is closely associated with his rhetorical skill, theological teaching, and expertise in biblical interpretation.

In many early sources, the term "mouth" (Classical Armenian: բերան) is used symbolically—as in the expressions "mouth of God" or "mouth of Christ"—to denote a figure of spiritual instruction and scriptural exegesis. Similar formulations appear in the works of John Chrysostom, Paul the Apostle, and Gregory of Nazianzus (also known as Gregory the Theologian).

The writings and theological vocabulary of Nerses Shnorhali align with the tradition of the Church Fathers, whose goal was to articulate and defend the "true faith." In various manuscripts and memorial texts, he is described with the phrase "gracious mouth," emphasizing his role as both a teacher and interpreter.

Nerses Shnorhali is also credited with efforts toward reconciling long-standing doctrinal differences between the Armenian and Greek churches, acting as a peacemaker in theological and diplomatic dialogue.

The epithet Shnorhali was later adopted more broadly as a title of honor for both governors and spiritual leaders, highlighting their eloquence, wisdom, and educational contributions.

=== Bishop ===
In 1125, Nerses assisted his older brother, now Catholicos Gregory III of Cilicia, in moving the catholicate to Dzovk near Lake Kharput, on the property of their father, Prince Apirat. In 1138, amid political tensions, Gregory and Nerses started on a pilgrimage to Jerusalem, and, on the way, took part in a synod at Antioch to examine the behavior of Ralph of Domfront, Latin Patriarch of Antioch. On the conclusion of the synod, Gregory continued on to Jerusalem together with the papal legate Alberic of Ostia, sending Nerses back.

In 1165, hostilities broke out between Thoros II, Prince of Armenia and Oshin of Lampron, the two strongest Armenian princes of Cilicia. Gregory sent his brother Nerses out to mediate.

On his way to the mediation, Nerses stopped at Mamistra, where he met the Byzantine governor Alexios Axouch and discussed the strained relations between the Armenian and Greek churches since the Greek Orthodox declared the Armenian Church and the Jacobite Church heretics in 1140. Axouch was sufficiently impressed with this discussion to urge Nerses to write an exposition of the Armenian faith which Axouch could then forward to the emperor in Constantinople. Nerses did so, stressing in his letter that, as both the Armenian and Greek churches accepted the statements of the First Council of Ephesus, there was no clear reason for them not to be in agreement, making no polemical statements about the later Council of Chalcedon and its Confession.

On Nerses' return from his successful mediation efforts in the Armenian war, and the death of his brother Gregory shortly thereafter, Nerses was made Catholicos of the Armenian Church.

=== Catholicos ===
While in office, he moved the see of the Catholicos from Sis to Hromkla (Rumkale).

After the death of his brother Gregory, the letter Nerses wrote to the Byzantine emperor Manuel I Komnenos received a reply from the emperor. In the letter, the emperor invited the then-deceased Catholicos Gregory to come to Constantinople. Nerses wrote back to the emperor, informing him of Gregory's death and suggesting that an alternative might be for a discussion in which both the Greek and Armenian churches could present their positions. In 1171, the emperor sent a delegation led by Theorianus, a theologian from Constantinople, and John Atman, an Armenian member of the Orthodox Church and abbot of the monastery at Philippopolis. Although there had been early hope for active participation by the Jacobite Church as well, the patriarch of the Jacobite church, Michael the Syrian, chose to only send an observer with a Jacobite profession of faith to the meeting. The meeting ultimately concluded with an agreement which basically accepted the position of the Greek church. Nerses created a new profession of faith for his church written in a conciliatory tone to be taken back to Constantinople for review by that church. He sent with it a confidential message to the emperor in which he promised to make every effort to reconcile the Armenian and Orthodox churches.

In December of that year Theorianus and John Atman returned to Hromgla with letters from the emperor and the Orthodox Patriarch Michael III of Constantinople. The letter from the emperor encouraged Nerses to work toward the unity of the two churches, and expressed sympathy for the problems that were expected from the clergy of the Armenian church. The official statement from Constantinople included nine points which the Orthodox established saw as being at odds with the imperial church. These included points of doctrine regarding some of the church councils, including Chalcedon, liturgical questions including use of unleavened bread and undiluted wine in the Eucharist, and the disparities between the liturgical calendars of the two churches. The statement also specifically required that the emperor should be given the authority to make the appointments of any further Catholicoi of the Armenian church.

Nerses was surprised by the severity of several of the proposals, and raised objections to them. In response, the delegates from the emperor produced the confidential letters exchanged by Nerses and the emperor, which served to embarrass Nerses to the Armenians. The revelation served to harden the objections of the Armenian clergy to any attempts at reconciliation. Nerses wrote out a letter to Constantinople in which he thanked the emperor for his interest, and promised that, at the appropriate time, there would be a council in Armenia formed to take up his proposals. Nerses also suggested that the Greeks might consider the possibility that perhaps some of its own traditions could bear some attention and correction.

Nerses was by this time some 70 years old, and he made arrangements to turn the position of Catholicos to another. Following the tradition of his family, he chose between two relatives who had already achieved the position of bishop in the church. Nerses' own choice was for the younger of the two candidates, but the other one, Gregory, had support from the prince Mleh and ultimately took the position of Catholicos in 1173.

== Works ==
In addition to the letters mentioned above, Nerses wrote a number of musical works, volumes of poetry, and theological works as well.

His major literary achievements include Vipasanut’iun, a novel written in poetic form, and Voghb Yedesio (Lamentation on Edessa), regarding the fall of Edessa.

Hisus Vordi is a reproduction of the Bible in poetic form, which also contains stories from church history and ends with the events of the End Times. It has been translated into English as Jesus Son.

Another of his works, Tught’ Endhanrakan is an exhortation on pastoral theology and how Christians should behave. The work also includes information on the hierarchy of the Armenian Apostolic Church and of society, and matters of daily life in that era of Cilician Armenian history. It has been translated into English and modern Armenian.

A collection of his daily prayers, Twenty-four Hour Prayers, has been translated into 32 languages, and one prayer in particular, Havatov Khostovanim (I Confess with Faith), is currently available in 36 languages. Several of Nerses' poems have been adopted for use in the Armenian Hymnal and Divine Liturgy. In James R. Russell's view, Nerses' poetry emphasizes "the imagery of fire and light in a manner at once redolent of Hesychasm and consonant with the Zoroastrian substrate of Armenian Christian culture."

One work of Nerses which has since been lost is a commentary on the Book of Genesis. In that work, he related the story he received from some Armenian monks who came to visit him during his time as Catholicos to tell him of how they were able to see the Garden of Eden from a distance. In one painting of the scene, the vegetation of the Garden appear as colored gemstones. Unfortunately, the angel with a sword appointed to guard the garden would not allow the monks to take one of the blossoms with them.

== Veneration ==
On 18 May 2026, Pope Leo XIV met with Catholicos Aram I and noted the recent inclusion of Saint Nerses Shnorhali in the Roman Martyrology, calling it an example of "ecumenism of the saints."

Preceded by Gregory III of Cilicia	Catholicos of the Holy See of Cilicia; 1166–1173	Succeeded by Gregory IV the Young
