= Grigor III Pahlavuni =

Catholicos of Cilicia from 1113 to 1166

Grigor III Pahlavuni Գրիգոր Գ. Պահլավունի
- See: Armenian Apostolic Church
- In office: 1113–1166
- Predecessor: Parsegh of Cilicia
- Successor: Nerses IV the Gracious

Personal details
- Born: 1093
- Died: 1166 (aged 72–73)

Grigor III Pahlavuni (Armenian: Գրիգոր Գ. Պահլավունի; also Catholicos Grigor III Pahlavuni or Gregory III of Cilicia) (1093–1166) was the catholicos of the Armenian Apostolic Church from 1113 to 1166.

== Biography ==
=== Election as Catholicos ===
Grigor was consecrated as catholicos around 1113/14 at the monastery of Karmir Vank in the vicinity of Kaysun where he had been brought by his maternal granduncle Grigor II (he would have been around 19-20). Grigor III held office as catholicos for a little more than fifty years, and his younger brother Nerses assisted him greatly during this time. Pahlavuni was able to maintain peace within Cilicia and the catholicosate during a time of instability due to raids from foreign invaders.

=== Reunification talks with the Catholic Church ===
In November 1139 he participated together with his brother Nerses in the legatine council convened by the papal legate Alberic of Ostia in the cathedral of Antioch. After that, Grigor continued with Alberic on a pilgrimage to Jerusalem. Here he attended another synod in the Templum Domini in April 1141 where he made a profession of faith and promised to restore union with Rome, which was achieved by the end of the century. According to Nersēs Lambronacʹi, the pope sent Grigor III a letter of greeting with a staff and a pallium.

=== Final years ===
Because of these foreign invasions, Grigor III chose to seek refuge and moved the catholicosate two times: once in 1116 from Karmir Vank' at Kaysun to its new location in Tsovak, and again in 1148 or 1150 to Hromgla, which he acquired from Beatrice from Turbessel. Nerses was elected co-catholicos in 1165. After Grigor III retired from his position in office in 1166, Nerses was elected unanimously to succeed him.

== Writing ==
He is known for his sharakans, which are collections of hymns, and for the several lays he had written during his lifetime. The sharakans written by Pahlavuni typically have strong doctrinal influences and several relate to either the Feast of the Annunciation or Palm Sunday. Two of his better known sharakans are Khorhurdn anchar ("Ineffable Mystery) and Metsahrash ("Marvelous"). Pahlavuni earned the nickname “the younger lover of martyrs” because of his love for translating martyrologies from Greek and Latin to Armenian (called the "younger" to distinguish him from his great-uncle Catholicos Gregory II the Martyrophile). During his time as catholicos, Grigor III and Pope Innocent II occasionally had some correspondence with one another. Only one of the aforementioned letters has survived as an Armenian translation of a letter from Pope Innocent II to the catholicos.

Preceded by Parsegh of Cilicia	Catholicos of the Holy See of Cilicia; 1113–1166	Succeeded by Nerses IV the Gracious

== Sources ==
- Clapp, James A.; Dadoyan, Seta B. (8 September 2017). The Armenians in the Medieval Islamic World: Armenian Realpolitik in the Islamic World and Diverging Paradigmscase of Cilicia Eleventh to Fourteenth Centuries. Routledge. ISBN 978-1-351-48576-0.
- Hacikyan, Agop J. (2002), The Heritage of Armenian Literature, Vol. 2: From the Sixth to the Eighteenth Century, Detroit, Michigan: Wayne State University Press, ISBN 0-8143-3023-1
- MacEvitt, Christopher (2007). "The Chronicle of Matthew of Edessa: Apocalypse, the First Crusade and the Armenian Diaspora". Dumbarton Oaks Papers. 61: 157–181.
- Phillips, Jonathan (15 May 2017). "Armenia, Edessa and the Second Crusade". In Housley, Norman (ed.). Knighthoods of Christ: Essays on the History of the Crusades and the Knights Templar, Presented to Malcolm Barber. Routledge. ISBN 978-1-351-92392-7.
- Ryan, James D. (1 May 2001). "Toleration Denied: Armenia between East and West in the Era of the Crusades". In Gervers, Michael; Powell, James M. (eds.). Tolerance and Intolerance: Social Conflict in the Age of the Crusades. Syracuse University Press. ISBN 978-0-8156-2869-9.
- van Lint, Theo M. (1999). "Lament on Edessa by Nerses Snorhali". In Ciggaar, Krijna Nelly; Teule, Herman G. B. (eds.). East and West in the Crusader States: Context, Contacts, Confrontations II : Acta of the Congress Held at Hernen Castle in May 1997. Peeters Publishers. pp. 29–48. ISBN 978-90-429-0786-7.

== See also ==
- Seats of the Catholicos of Armenians
- List of Catholicoi of Armenia
- Catholicos of Cilicia
