= Ablgharib =

Armenian lord of Birejik

Ablgharib (Armenian: Աբուլ Ղարիբ) was an Armenian lord of Birejik and chief of the Pahlavuni clan. He was installed as governor of Birejik by Baldwin I following the crushing of an Armenian conspiracy in 1098. He joined Baldwin I and Kogh Vasil in their campaign in the north to lift Mawdud's siege on Edessa in 1110. Finally, he was displaced by Baldwin II, following a year of siege, in 1117. Baldwin II gave Birejik to his cousin Waleran of Le Puiset, who married another of Ablgharib's daughters.

== Sources ==
- Barber, Malcolm (2012). The Crusader States. Yale University Press. ISBN 978-0-300-11312-9.
- Fink, Harold S. (1969). "The Foundation of the Latin States, 1099–1118". In Setton, Kenneth M.; Baldwin, Marshall W. (eds.). A History of the Crusades, Volume One: The First Hundred Years. The University of Wisconsin Press. pp. 368–409. ISBN 978-1-58684-251-2.
- MacEvitt, Christopher (2010). The Crusades and the Christian World of the East: Rough Tolerance. University of Pennsylvania Press. ISBN 978-0-8122-4050-4.
- Morton, Nicholas (April 2020). The Crusader States and their Neighbours: A Military History, 1099-1187. Oxford University Press. ISBN 9780192557988.
- Runciman, Steven (1989) [1951]. A history of the Crusades. Vol. 1. Cambridge: Cambridge University Press. ISBN 978-0-521-06161-2.
- Runciman, Steven (1989b). A History of the Crusades, Volume II: The Kingdom of Jerusalem and the Frankish East, 1100-1187. Cambridge University Press. ISBN 978-0-521-06162-9.
