= Alexios Aspietes =

Byzantine governor (1159–1205)

- Born: 1159
- Died: 1205
- Battles / wars: Uprising of Asen and Peter

Alexios Aspietes (Greek: Ἀλέξιος Ἀσπιέτης, fl. 1159–1205) was a Byzantine governor and military leader who was captured by the Bulgarians, and led an anti-Bulgarian rebellion at Philippopolis in 1205, being acclaimed emperor by the citizens.

== Life ==
A member of the Aspietes family, of noble Armenian origin, Alexios Aspietes was probably a relative of the generals Michael Aspietes and Constantine Aspietes, who were active in the late 12th century. Alexios Aspietes first appears in 1195, when he was governor of the town of Serres, and was ordered by Emperor Alexios III Angelos to march against the Bulgarian–Vlach rebellion of the brothers Peter and Ivan Asen. In the event, in the summer or autumn of the same year, Aspietes and his army were defeated by the rebels, who took many prisoners, including Aspietes himself.

Aspietes disappears from the record for the next decade, but was apparently released from captivity, since in 1205 he is mentioned as being in Philippopolis (modern Plovdiv in Bulgaria). In the aftermath of the crushing victory by the Bulgarian tsar Kaloyan over the forces of the Latin Empire at the Battle of Adrianople on 14 April, the mostly Byzantine Greek citizenry of Philippopolis rose up in opposition to the imminent conquest of their city by Kaloyan, and proclaimed Aspietes as emperor. Kaloyan immediately turned his army on the city, and after a brief resistance, the inhabitants were forced to surrender on terms in June. Kaloyan, however, enraged by the Greeks' collusion with the Latins, did not keep his word and executed the city's leaders, including Aspietes who, according to Niketas Choniates, was first left hanging upside down before being dismembered and thrown into a ravine to be eaten by the vultures.

== Sources ==
- Kazhdan, Alexander (1991). "Aspietes". In Kazhdan, Alexander (ed.). The Oxford Dictionary of Byzantium. Oxford and New York: Oxford University Press. pp. 211–212. ISBN 0-19-504652-8.
- Savvides, Alexis G. K. (1991). "Notes on the Armeno-Byzantine family of Aspietes, late 11th-early 13th centuries". Byzantinoslavica. 52. Prague: 70–79.
