= Kingdom of Vaspurakan =

Medieval Armenian kingdom

Coordinates: 38.8°N 44.0°E

Kingdom of Vaspurakan Վասպուրական
- 908–1021
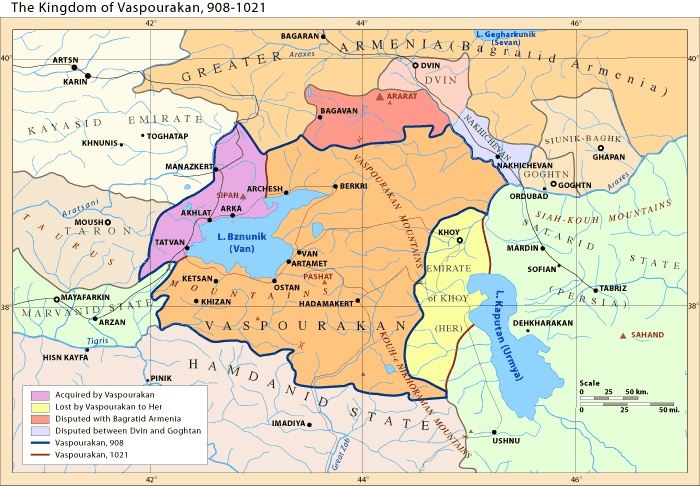
- The Kingdom of Vaspurakan from 908 to 1021
- Status: Kingdom
- Capital: Van
- Common languages: Armenian
- Religion: Armenian Apostolic Church
- Government: Monarchy
- King
  - 908–937/943: Gagik I Artsruni
  - 937/943—958/959: Derenik-Ashot
  - 958/959–968/969: Abusahl-Hamazasp
  - 968/969–1003: Ashot-Sahak
  - 991–1003: Gurgen-Khachik
  - 1003–1021: Seneqerim-Hovhannes
- Historical era: Middle Ages
  - Gagik I recognized as King of Armenia by Arab Caliph: 908
  - Senekerim-Hovhannes gives Vaspurakan to the Byzantine Empire: 1021
- Currency: Solidus (coin), Hyperpyron
Preceded by	Succeeded by
Bagratid Armenia	Byzantine Empire
- Today part of: Turkey; Iran; Iraq; Azerbaijan

The Kingdom of Vaspurakan (Armenian: Վասպուրականի թագավորություն; also transliterated as Vasbouragan from Western Armenian) was a medieval Armenian kingdom centered on Lake Van, located in what is now eastern Turkey and northwestern Iran. It was named after Vaspurakan, a province of historic Greater Armenia. Ruled by the Artsruni dynasty, it competed and cooperated with the Bagratuni-ruled Kingdom of Armenia for a little over a century until its last king ceded the kingdom to the Byzantine Empire in 1021.

== History ==
The Kingdom of Vaspurakan was ruled by the Artsruni dynasty, an ancient Armenian noble family. The Artsrunis had built up their power base in Vaspurakan in the 9th century while Arab rule was waning. The Bagratunis, on the other hand, were consolidating their control over Armenia. In 885, Ashot I Bagratuni received recognition as King of Armenia. In 908, during the reign of Ashot's successor Smbat I, Gagik I Artsruni was recognized as king by the Sajid ruler Yusuf and allied with the latter to attack the Bagratuni kingdom. After Smbat's death at the hands of Yusuf in 914, however, Gagik allied with the new Bagratuni king Ashot II to defeat the Arabs.

The Kingdom of Vaspurakan was at its zenith around 929 under the reign of Gagik I, who used the title of King of Armenia. He undertook a series of construction projects, particularly on Aghtamar, an island in Lake Van where one of his residences was located. Aghtamar also served as the residence of the Armenian Catholicos while Dvin was under Muslim control, allowing Gagik to influence the election of several catholicoi and further increase his legitimacy. At its greatest extent Vaspurakan comprised the lands between Lake Van and Lake Urmia (also known as Kaputan) in 908. It encompassed most of the historic provinces of Vaspurakan and Mokkʻ and, temporarily in the 910s, controlled parts of the provinces of Ayrarat, Taron and Korchaykʻ. The Kingdom of Vaspurakan had no specific capital. The court moved as the king transferred his residence from place to place – Van, Ostan/Vostan (modern Gevaş), Aghtamar and so on.

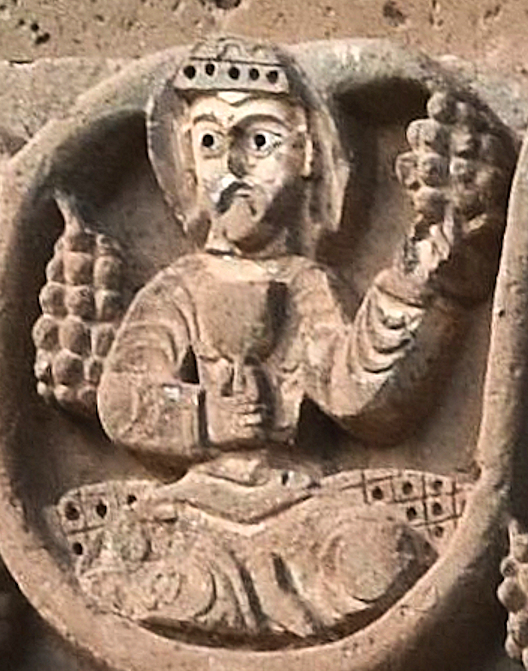
Assumed depiction of Gagik I Artsruni in the vine-scroll relief on the eastern facade of the Church of the Holy Cross (915–921)

Although Gagik attempted to compete with Abas I Bagratuni in the 930s, he was eventually forced to accept the supremacy of the Bagratuni kingdom. Gagik died in 943 and was succeeded by his son Derenik-Ashot, who died without an heir in 953. He was succeeded by his brother Abusahl-Hamazasp, upon whose death the kingdom was divided among his three sons: Ashot-Sahak, Gurgen-Khachik and Senekerim-Hovhannes. The eldest brother, Ashot, retained the royal title and the suzerainty over his younger brothers. After Ashot's death Gurgen took the throne, bypassing the former's sons; Senekerim-Hovhannes became king in the same manner in 1003 following Gurgen's death.

Senekerim-Hovhannes married his daughter to Bagrat III of Georgia, seeking an alliance against the eastward expanding Byzantine Empire. In 1016, the kingdom was devastated by a raid by the Seljuq Turks. In 1021, King Senekerim-Hovhannes ceded the Kingdom of Vaspurakan to the Byzantine Empire, receiving Sebasteia and its territories extending to the Euphrates in return. Vaspurakan became the Byzantine province (theme) of Vasprakania or Media. In about 1050 Vasprakania was merged with that of Taron, but was conquered by the Seljuqs in 1054–1056.

After the Byzantine annexation, the Artsruni dynasty continued with Derenik, son of Gurgen-Khatchik, who became lord of Antzivazik by 1004 and had two brothers: Gugik and Ashot. King Senekerim-Hovhannes also had several children, among them David, Atom, Abushal and Constantine. There is a legend that one of Senekerim's daughter married Mendo Alao, an Alan who lived in Lusitania. David had a daughter that married King Gagik II of Ani.

Another branch of the family appeared in the person of Khatchik the Great in 1040, who had three children: Hasan, Djendjluk and Ishkhanik. Hasan had a son called Abelgharib who had a daughter that married Prince David, son of Gagik II.

== Rulers ==
=== Princes ===
- Hamazasp II, Prince (800–836). Married to a daughter of Ashot Msaker of the Bagratuni family.
- Ashot I Abulabus Artsruni, Prince (836–852). Son of Hamazasp II. First time.
- Gurgen I Artsruni, Prince (852–853). Brother of Ashot I.
- Abu Djafar Artsruni, Prince (853–854). Probably brother of Ashot I.
- Gurgen II Artsruni of Mardastan, Prince. (854–857). Distant relative.
- Grigor-Derenik Artsruni, Prince (857–868). Married Sofia, daughter of Ashot I Bagratuni the Great, Prince of Armenia. Son of Ashot I Artsruni. First time.
- Ashot I Abulabus Artsruni, Prince (868–874). Second time.
- Grigor-Derenik Artsruni, Prince (874–887). Second time.
- Gagik Abu Morvan Artsruni, regent for Grigor-Derenik's sons (887–896), then usurper prince (896–898).
- Ashot-Sargis Artsruni (Ashot II), Prince (898–900). Son of Grigor-Derenik.
- (Vaspurakan occupied by the Sajid emir Afshin (900).)
- Safi, as governor of Van (900–901).
- Ashot-Sargis Artsruni (Ashot II) (901–904). Reinstated. After his death Vaspurakan was divided:
- Gagik III (I) Artsruni, Prince (later king) in northwest Vaspurakan (904–908).Brother of Ashot-Sargis.
- Gurgen III Artsruni, Prince in southeast Vaspurakan (904–925). Brother of Ashot-Sargis.

=== Kings ===
- Gagik I (III) Artsruni, crowned king (908–925 northwestern part, 925–943 all Vaspurakan)
- Derenik-Ashot (Ashot III), King (943–953). Son of Gagik I.
- Abusahl-Hamazasp, King (953–972). Brother of Derenik-Ashot I.
- Ashot-Sahak (Ashot IV), King (972–983). Son of Abusahl-Hamazasp.
- Gurgen-Khachik (Gurgen IV), King (983–1003) and Lord of Antzevasiq. Brother of Ashot-Sahak.
- Senekerim-Hovhannes, Brother of Ashot-Sahak, King (1003–1021) and lord of Rechtuniq. Brother of Gurgen Khatchik.

== Bibliography ==
- Boase, T.S.R. (1978). The Cilician kingdom of Armenia. Edinburgh: Scottish Academic Press. SBN 707301459.
- Der Nersessian, Sirarpie (1947). Armenia and the Byzantine Empire: A Brief Study of Armenian Art and Civilization. Cambridge: Harvard University Press.
- Hewsen, Robert H. (2001). Armenia: A Historical Atlas. The University of Chicago Press. ISBN 0-226-33228-4.
- Hovannisian, Richard G., ed. (2000). Armenian Van/Vaspurakan. Historic Armenian Cities and Provinces. Costa Mesa, California: Mazda Publishers..
- Vardanyan, V. (1985). "Vaspurakani tʻagavorutʻyun". In Hambardzumyan, Viktor (ed.). Soviet Armenian Encyclopedia (in Armenian). Vol. 11. Yerevan. pp. 296–297.
