= Aspietes (general under Alexios I) =

Armenian noble

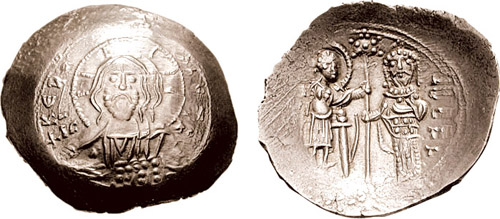
Alexius I Comnenus. 1081-1118. Thessalonica mint. Struck 1081-1082.

Aspietes (Greek: Ἀσπιέτης) was an Armenian nobleman who entered the service of the Byzantine Empire and served during much of the reign of Alexios I Komnenos (1081–1118).

He was a member of the noble family of the Aspietai, which claimed descent from the Arsacid royal dynasty of Armenia. Aspietes is first attested alongside Alexios I during the 1081 campaign against the Normans that led to the disastrous Battle of Dyrrhachium, where Aspietes himself was gravely injured. The scene is graphically narrated by Alexios' daughter Anna Komnene in her Alexiad, highlighting Aspietes' valour.

The name "Aspietes" appears in two different portions of the Alexiad, and it is not entirely clear whether it refers to the same or different people. Most scholars identify the Aspietes of Dyrrhachium with the Aspietes who in 1105/6 was appointed governor of Tarsus by the Emperor. Shortly after, he succeeded Monastras as stratopedarches of the East, in charge of the campaign against the Principality of Antioch. In this capacity he failed to react effectively to Tancred of Antioch, who proceeded to recapture Mopsuestia and several other fortresses that Monastras had taken the previous year. Instead, Aspietes occupied himself with debauched revelries. More recently, Alexis Savvides argued that the two personages are usually treated as distinct people, and interpreted—erroneously, according to Alexandra Wassiliou-Seibt—the relevant passage in the Alexiad as indicating that the first Aspietes died of his wounds at Dyrrhachium.

Aspietes is not mentioned again after 1105/6. Nevertheless, beginning with the 17th-century scholar Du Cange, many historians, including Ferdinand Chalandon, Steven Runciman, and Alexis Savvides, have traditionally identified him with Oshin of Lampron (1073–1112), the lord of Cilician Armenia, who in turn is identified with the Ursinus of Western sources. It was only in 1924 that Joseph Laurent rejected this identification, and this view has been followed by several modern scholars since.

== Sources ==
- Kazhdan, Alexander (1991). "Aspietes". In Kazhdan, Alexander (ed.). The Oxford Dictionary of Byzantium. Oxford and New York: Oxford University Press. pp. 211–212. ISBN 0-19-504652-8.
- Savvides, Alexis G. K. (1991). "Notes on the Armeno-Byzantine family of Aspietes, late 11th-early 13th centuries". Byzantinoslavica. 52. Prague: 70–79.
- Skoulatos, Basile (1980). Les personnages byzantins de l'Alexiade: Analyse prosopographique et synthèse [The Byzantine Personalities of the Alexiad: Prosopographical Analysis and Synthesis] (in French). Louvain-la-Neuve and Louvain: Bureau du Recueil Collège Érasme and Éditions Nauwelaerts. OCLC 8468871.
- Wassiliou-Seibt, Alexandra-Kyriaki (2015). "Kaukasische Aristokraten auf byzantinischer Karriereleiter. Eine kritische Nachlese des Quellenbefunds zur Familie der Aspietai (1081 – 1205)". Byzantinische Zeitschrift (in German). 108 (1): 207–218. doi:10.1515/bz-2015-0011. S2CID 193622645.
