= Aspietes =

Byzantine noble family

Aspietes (Greek: Ἀσπιέτης, from Armenian: ասպետ, romanized: aspet, lit. 'rider, knight'), feminine form Aspietina (Ἀσπιετίνα) or Aspietissa (Ἀσπιέτισσα), was a Byzantine noble family of Armenian origin active in the 12th–15th centuries.

Despite the mention of a "great and numerous lineage of the so-called Aspetianoi" by the 6th-century Byzantine historian Procopius of Caesarea, the later Aspietai seem to be entirely unrelated to them. The later Byzantine writers ascribed the Aspietai descent from the Arsacid royal dynasty, but Alexandra Wassiliou-Seibt points out that this was a common literary topos at the time, and that "almost all representatives of the senior Armenian nobility [..] were regarded as descendants of the Arsacids".

The first known member of the Aspietai family was a general of Alexios I Komnenos, active in the early 12th century. Beginning with the 17th-century scholar Du Cange, successive historians, including Ferdinand Chalandon, Steven Runciman, and Konstantinos Varzos, have identified him with Oshin of Lampron. In 1924, however, Joseph Laurent rejected this identification, and has been followed by some modern scholars since.

Most of the known members of the family served as military commanders: apart from the original Aspietes/Oshin, another member of the family fought and was killed at the Battle of Dyrrhachium in 1081, Michael Aspietes was a general under Manuel I Komnenos, Constantine Aspietes served under both Manuel I and Isaac II Angelos, Alexios Aspietes served as commander of Serres in 1195 and was proclaimed emperor in 1204, while a member of the family headed an embassy to Saladin in 1189.

The family is still extensively attested in the Palaiologan period, where it still belonged to the landed nobility and intermarried with other noble houses, but none of its members managed to rise to senior offices.

== Sources ==
- Kazhdan, Alexander (1991). "Aspietes". In Kazhdan, Alexander (ed.). The Oxford Dictionary of Byzantium. Oxford and New York: Oxford University Press. pp. 211–212. ISBN 0-19-504652-8.
- Savvides, Alexis G. K. (1991). "Notes on the Armeno-Byzantine family of Aspietes, late 11th-early 13th centuries". Byzantinoslavica. 52. Prague: 70–79.
- Wassiliou-Seibt, Alexandra-Kyriaki (2015). "Kaukasische Aristokraten auf byzantinischer Karriereleiter. Eine kritische Nachlese des Quellenbefunds zur Familie der Aspietai (1081 – 1205)". Byzantinische Zeitschrift (in German). 108 (1): 207–218. doi:10.1515/bz-2015-0011.
