= Waleran of Le Puiset =

Lord of Bîrejik and in 1118 temporary regent of the County of Edessa

Waleran (Galéran) of Le Puiset (died in prison in 1126), son of Hugh I of Le Puiset and Alice de Montlhéry (daughter of Guy I of Montlhéry). Seigneur of Birejik.

He is quoted in a donation made circa 1102 by his brother Hugh to the abbey of Saint-Martin-des-Champs. He went to fight in the Holy Land at the service of Count Baldwin II of Edessa, in the army of Bohemond of Taranto. From 1115, he decided to eliminate the Armenian nobility of the county after several Armenian plots to deliver Edessa to the Turks. After having subjected and exiled Kogh Vasil, Baldwin attacked Abu'lgharib Artsuni, Lord of Birejik. A compromise is reached, whereby Abu'lgharib delivered the city and exiled himself into Cilician Armenia. Baldwin then gave the fief of Birejik and the hand of the daughter of Abu'lgharib to Waleran.

King Baldwin I of Jerusalem died in 1118, and Baldwin II, Count of Edessa, succeeded him, with the help of Joscelin I of Courtenay. Before his departure for Jerusalem in 1118, Baldwin, before entrusting Edessa to Waleran, subordinated the county of Edessa to Joscelin in order to reward him for his help in gaining the throne.

On September 13, 1122, Joscelin and Waleran tried to surprise Belek Ghazi, who traveled from Aleppo to his stronghold of Kharput, but they were captured and imprisoned. King Baldwin II, who tried to free them, is captured in turn on April 18, 1123. Belek then tried to exploit his advantage and invade the principality of Antioch. But a mere fifty Armenians undertook to deliver their lords and went to Kharput, disguised as monks and merchants. With the help of the Armenian workers of the city, they massacred the garrison, seized the citadel and delivered the prisoners. While Baldwin, Waleran and the Armenians held the city, Joscelin went to seek help. But Belek, warned on August 7, 1123, returned to Kharput and besieged the citadel, forcing the defenders to surrender before the arrival of those who would rescue the defenders.. Belek ordered the execution of all the defenders, with the exception of Baldwin, one of his nephews, and Waleran, who were again imprisoned and transferred to Harran. Waleran died in captivity in 1126.

== Sources ==
Riley-Smith, Jonathan, The First Crusaders, 1095-1131, Cambridge University Press, London, 1997

La Monte, John L., The Lords of Le Puiset on the Crusades. Speculum, 1942 JSTOR 2856610

Grousset, René, L'Empire du Levant : Histoire de la Question d'Orient, Paris, Payot, coll. Bibliothèque historique, 1949

Grousset, René, Histoire des croisades et du royaume franc de Jérusalem, Vol I. 1095-1130, L'anarchie musulmane, Paris, Perrin, 1934

Runciman, Steven, A History of the Crusades, Volume II: The Kingdom of Jerusalem and the Frankish East, 1100-1187, Cambridge University Press, London, 1952
