= Gregory II the Martyrophile =

Armenian Catholicos in the 11th century

Gregory the Martyrophile

Catholicos of All Armenians (Patriarch of Armenia)
- Born: abt. 1035; Kingdom of Armenia
- Died: February 23, 1105; Daranali, Kingdom of Armenia
- Venerated in: Armenian Apostolic Church; Oriental Orthodox Churches
- Feast: August 13th (Armenian Apostolic Church)

Gregory II the Martyrophile (Armenian: Գրիգոր Բ. Վկայասէր, romanized: Grigor Vkayasēr) was the Catholicos of the Armenian Apostolic Church between 1065 and 1105.

== Life ==
=== Origin ===
Gregory was born under the name Vahram as the son of Grigor Magistros, a member of the princely Pahlavuni family and Doux of Edessa as well as a scholar. Vahram had been engaged in literary pursuits from a young age and held his father's post for some time after the latter's death in 1059. According to Matthew of Edessa, Vahram was married and a "well-disciplined man, virtuous, versed in rhetorical skills and in God's Old and New Testament".

=== Election as Catholicos ===
On the death of Catholicos Khachig II, the Byzantines had hoped to leave Armenia without a catholicos for good, part of an effort to subdue them as a people and assimilate them into the Greek rite. However, Mary, the daughter of King Gagik-Abas of Kars was a favorite of Byzantine empress Eudokia Makrembolitissa and obtained through her influence the permission to fill the empty seat. A meeting of the clergy elected Vahram, son of Grigor Magistros, as pontiff in 1065. On his election he adopted the pontifical name Gregory in honor of Gregory the Illuminator, the founder of the Armenian Church. He received the epithet Martyrophile for his translation of martyrologies from Greek, Syriac and Latin into Armenian.

The Byzantine army invaded again, and Gregory abdicated in 1071 since he was unable to stave off these problems. He appointed the vardapet George of Lori (Gevorg Loretsi) as his successor and retired to a mountain around Tarsus. However, he was still regarded by the Armenian people as pontiff, and they referred to him for advice. George was offended by this and took imprudent measures as a response, at which point the clergy met at Gregory's retreat and deposed George. He had reigned for two years before Gregory resumed the office officially. At this same time a monk named Sargis exercised control in his local region as pontiff and was succeeded by Theodorus, but the Armenian Church considers neither these two nor George of Lori to be canonical pontiffs. Shortly after regaining his position as pontiff around 1074, Gregory made a visit to Ani which at that point was in the hands of the Seljuk Turks and resided there a few months. He then returned home and wrote a letter to Pope Gregory VII, who responded in a friendly manner. In 1074, Gregory II traveled to Constantinople and then allegedly to Rome to visit the Pope. This is, however, contested due to lack of evidence of Armenian-Latin Roman relations and it is more likely that Gregory sent a priest to Rome in his name. After a few months, Gregory II then made pilgrimage to Jerusalem and then went to Memphis, Egypt where he lived for a year. He appointed a nephew of his, Gregorius, as prelate at Memphis and then finally returned home.

=== Four Catholicoi ===
With Gregory II living in Tarsus, the eastern Armenians considered themselves without a pontiff and obtained his sanction to elect his nephew, Parsegh (Basil), bishop of Ani, as their pontiff. Two years later, Philaretos Brachamios, an Armenian warlord who controlled the area around Edessa, Melitene and Antioch, invited Gregory to move to Marash in order to have a catholicos under control for his lands. Gregory II declined but suggested Philaretos to elect Paul, abbot of Varagavank, as catholicos of this region. This means there were now four pontiffs of the Armenian church: Gregory II in the region of Mount Tarsus, his nephew Parsegh in Ani for the eastern Armenians, the previously mentioned Theodorus, and Paul in Marash. There was much enmity between them and the cause of much confusion. Paul saw this and decided to relinquish his seat and retire to his convent, at which time the nation at large recognized Gregory II alone as pontiff, with Parsegh as his deputy. In 1087 Parsegh deposed Theodorus and settled at Edessa. Gregory seems to have been in Jerusalem during the Siege of Jerusalem by the remaining forces of the First Crusade in 1099.

=== Move to Kaysun and final years ===
In 1103, after many requests, Gregory II finally accepted the invitation of Kogh Vasil to move his residence to Rapan, in the vicinity of the city of Kaysun, to spend his last years. As he left his Tarsus monastery, he took with him wards Gregory III of Cilicia and Nerses IV the Graceful, in whom he recognized future greatness. He entrusted the two preteens to the care of his nephew and deputy Parsegh as well as to his host Kogh Vasil, and stated that on his death Parsegh should be made Catholicos and after him should follow young Gregory. He died shortly after on 3 June 1105 and was buried there at the Karmir Vank (Red Monastery) at Rapan near Kaysun.

== Sources ==
- Dadoyan, Seta B. (2013). The Armenians in the Medieval Islamic World: Armenian Realpolitik in the Islamic World and Diverging Paradigms: Case of Cilicia Eleventh to Fourteenth Centuries. New Brunswick, New Jersey: Transaction Publishers. ISBN 978-1-4128-4782-7.
- Berjekian, Pakrad (2002). Catholicos Grigor the Martyrophile's Treatise on Sunday Observance and Against Insults (MA thesis). Mount Scopus Hebrew University of Jerusalem.
- Tahmizian, N. (1977). "Grigor B Vkayaser" Գրիգոր Բ Վկայասեր. In Simonian, Abel (ed.). Haykakan sovetakan hanragitaran Հայկական սովետական հանրագիտարան [Armenian Soviet Encyclopedia] (in Armenian). Vol. 3. Yerevan. p. 213.

Preceded by Khachig II of Cilicia	Catholicos of the Holy See of Cilicia; 1066–1105	Succeeded by Parsegh of Cilicia
