= Tsovak =

Village in Gegharkunik, Armenia

Tsovak Ծովակ
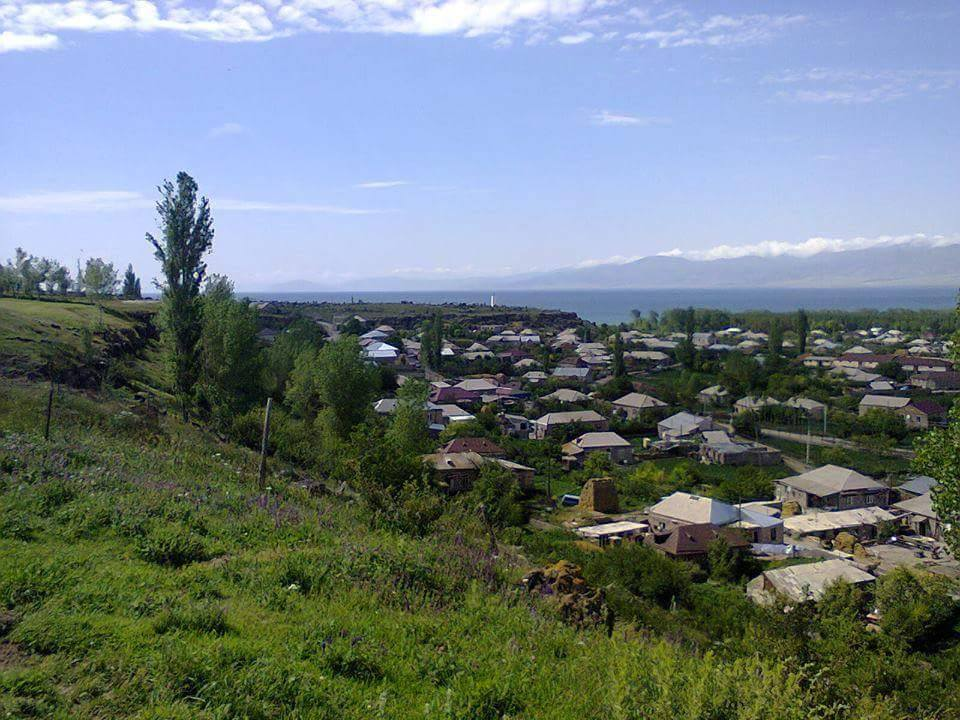
- A view of Tsovak

- Location within Armenia Location within Gegharkunik
- Coordinates: 40°10′58″N 45°38′02″E
- Country: Armenia
- Province: Gegharkunik
- Municipality: Vardenis
- Elevation: 1,920 m (6,300 ft)

Population (2011)
  - Total: 2,319
- Time zone: UTC+4 (AMT)
- Postal code: 1612

Tsovak (Armenian: Ծովակ) is a village in the Vardenis Municipality of the Gegharkunik Province of Armenia.

== History ==
The village is the site of a large Iron Age fort atop the hill to the south and west, with an 8th-century BCE cuneiform inscription of Sarduri II cut into the stone at the north edge of the fortification.

== Gallery ==
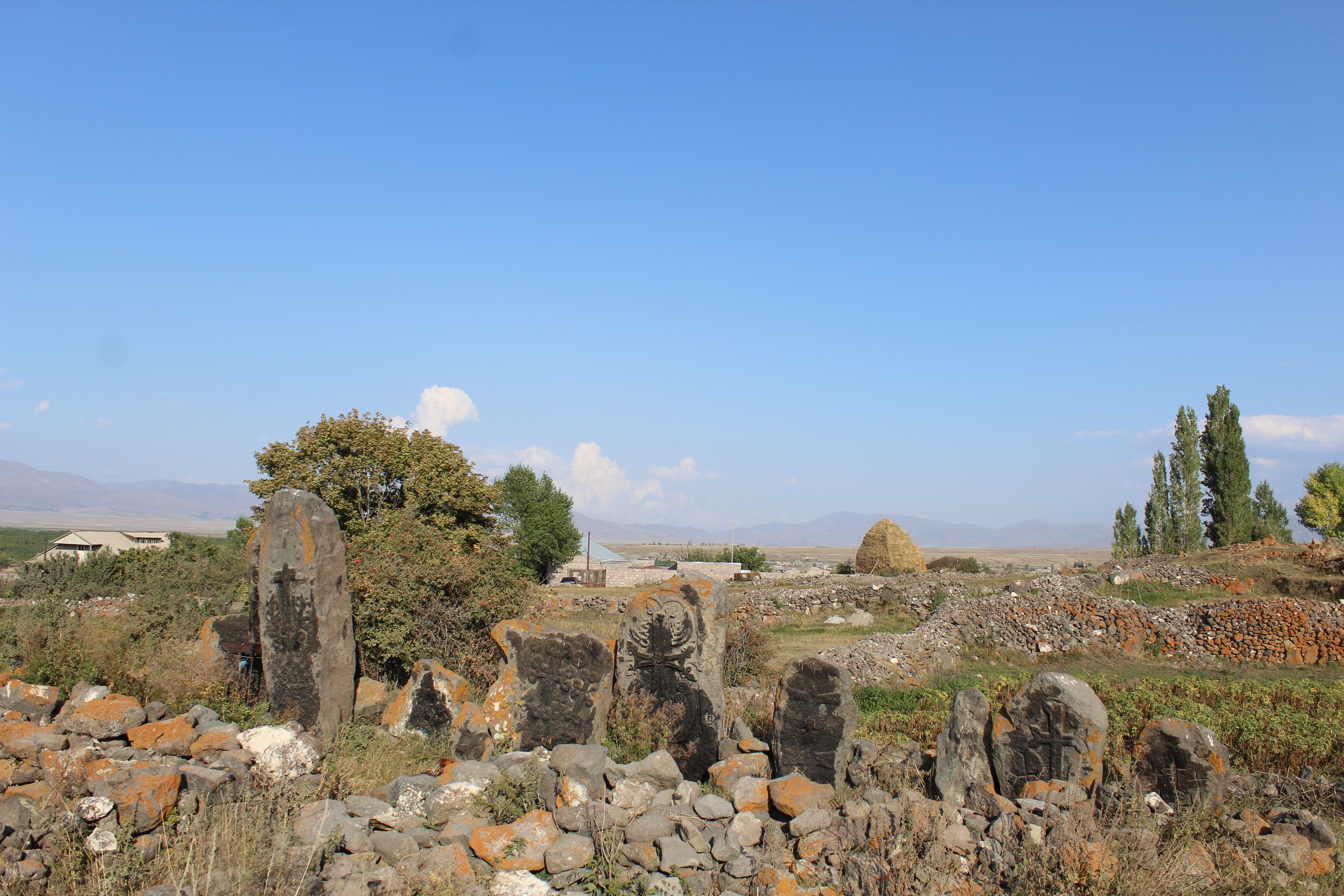
Khachkars in Tsovak

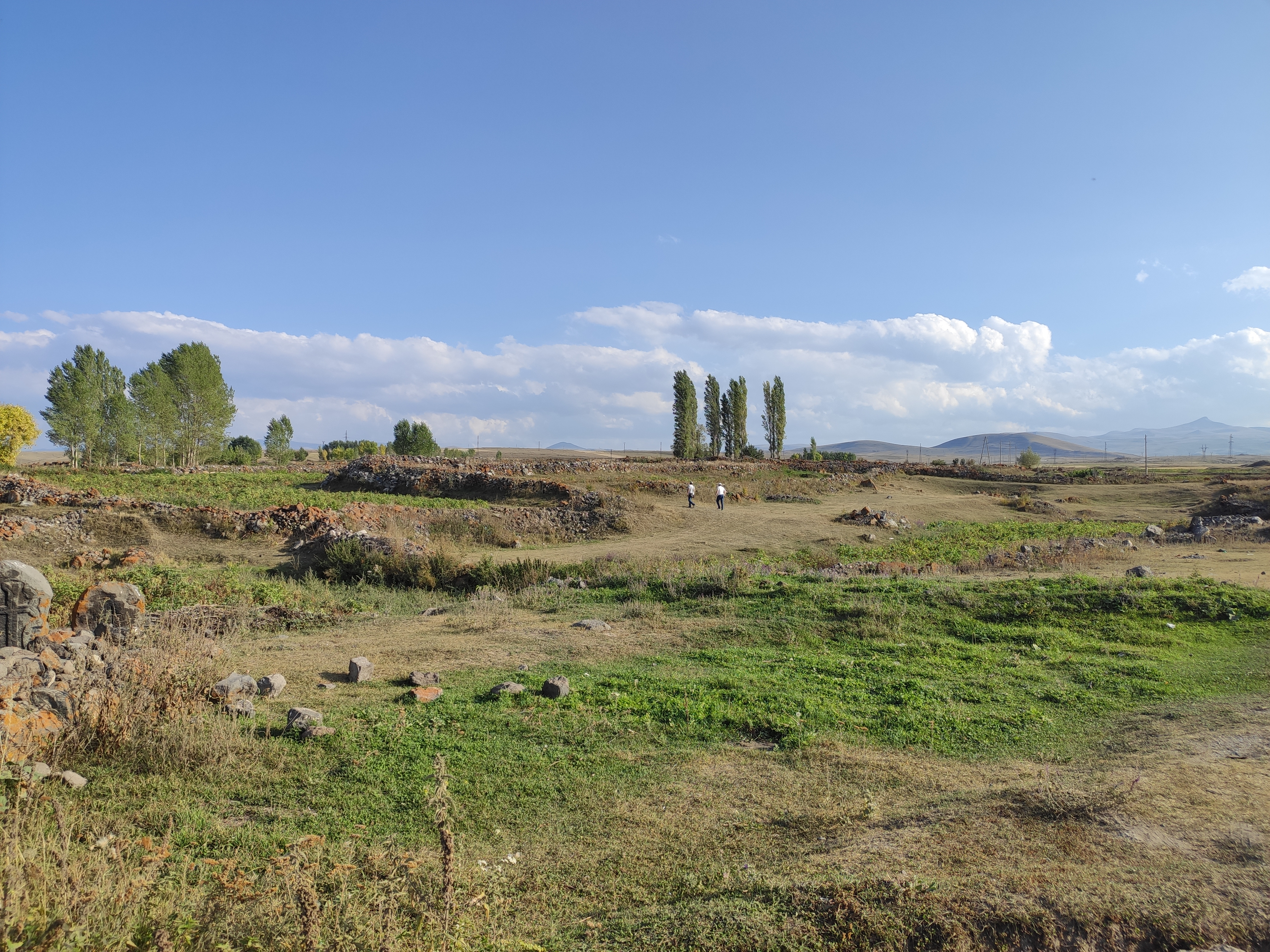
Tsovak castle

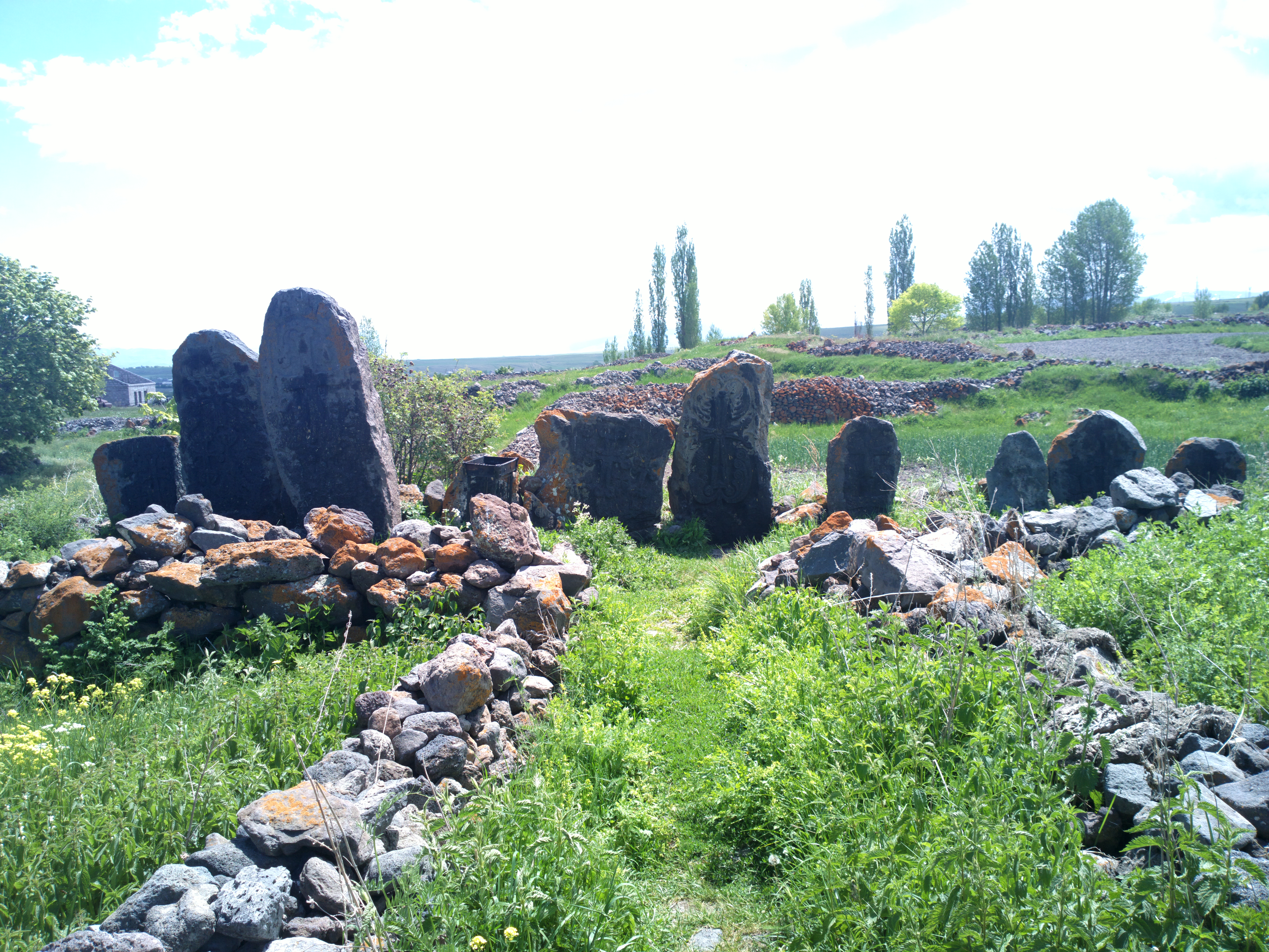
Yot Axper chapel

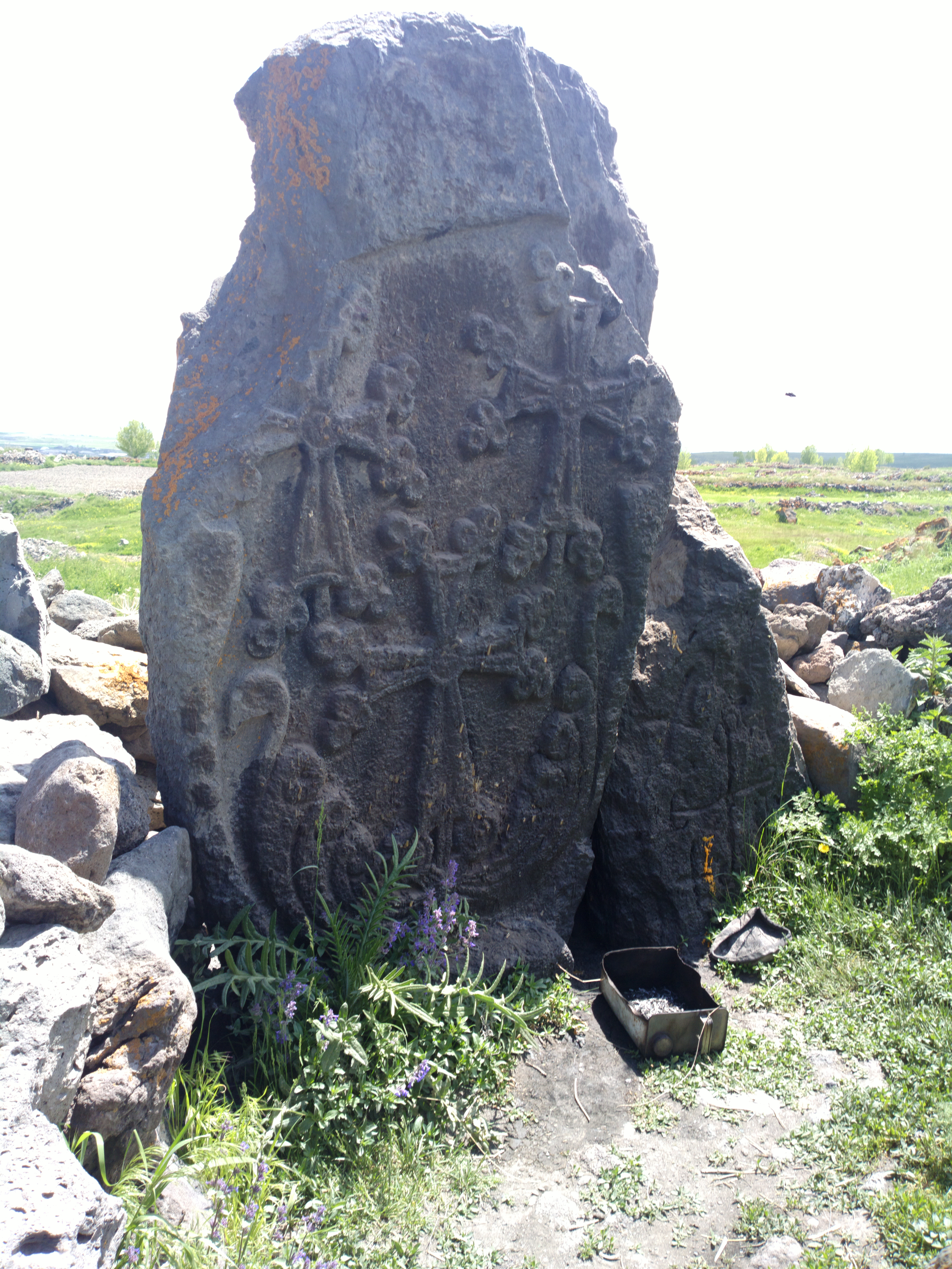
Khachkar in Yot Axper chapel

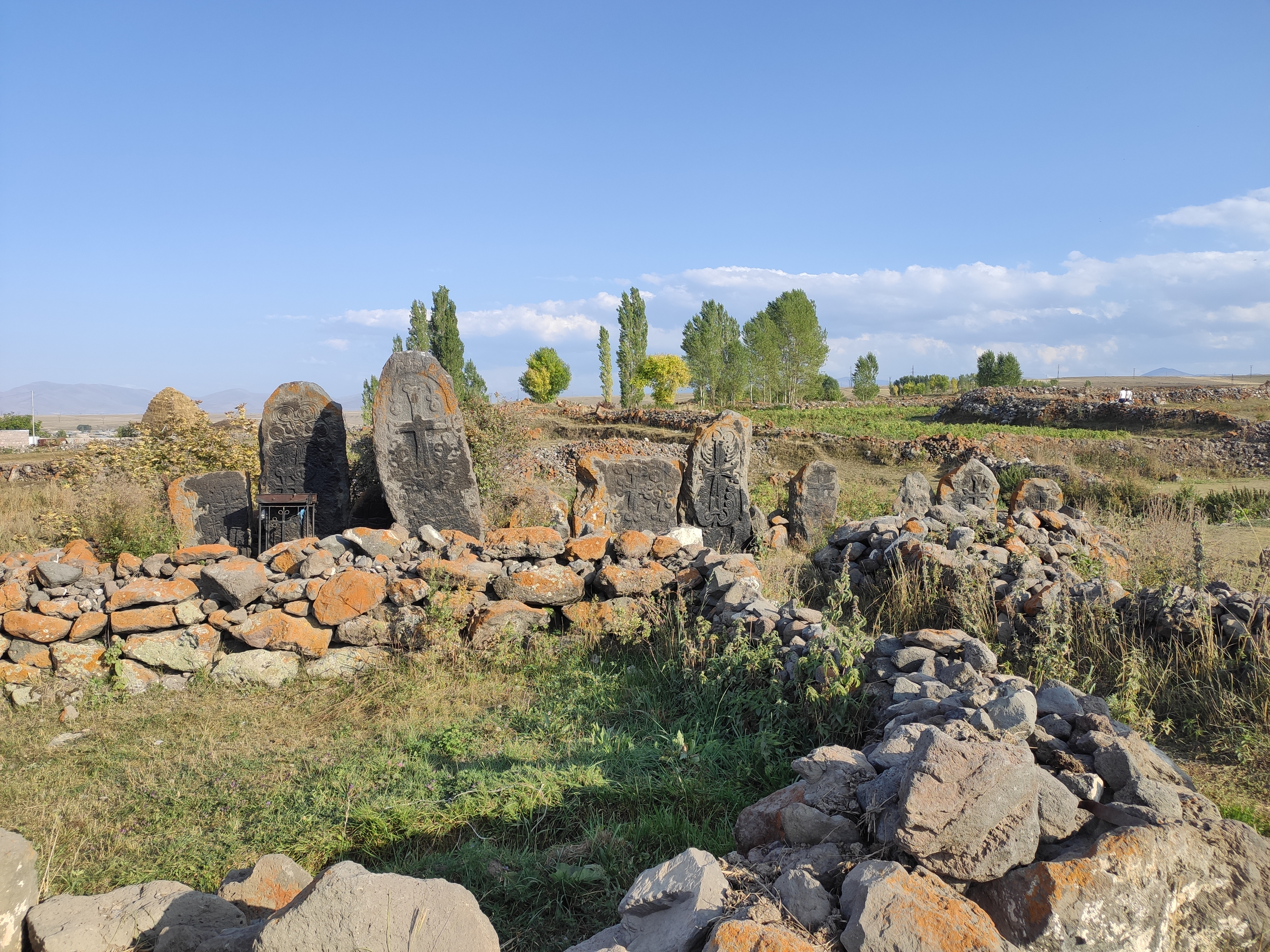
Yot Axper chapel
