= Vasil Dgha =

Ruler of Raban and Kaisun from 1112 to 1116

Vasil Dgha, or Dgha Vasil (dgha meaning "child, boy"), was the Armenian ruler of Raban and Kaisun. He succeeded his adoptive father, Kogh Vasil, in 1112. Baldwin II, Count of Edessa, tortured Vasil to force him to abandon his domains in 1116. Vasil settled in Constantinople.

== Sources ==
- Fink, Harold S. (1969). "The Foundation of the Latin States, 1099–1118". In Setton, Kenneth M.; Baldwin, Marshall W. (eds.). A History of the Crusades, Volume One: The First Hundred Years. The University of Wisconsin Press. pp. 368–409. ISBN 978-1-58684-251-2.
- MacEvitt, Christopher (2010). The Crusades and the Christian World of the East: Rough Tolerance. University of Pennsylvania Press. ISBN 978-0-8122-4050-4.
- Runciman, Steven (1989). A History of the Crusades, Volume II: The Kingdom of Jerusalem and the Frankish East, 1100-1187. Cambridge University Press. ISBN 0-521-06162-8.
