= Seats of the Catholicos of Armenians =

Seats of the Catholicos of Armenians is the list of the seats of the Catholicos of Armenians, the spiritual leader of Armenia's national church, the Armenian Apostolic Church, and the worldwide Armenian diaspora.

| Number | Place | Years |
|---|---|---|
| 1 | Etchmiadzin Cathedral, Vagharshapat (Etchmiadzin) | 301–484/485 |
| 2 | Dvin | 484/485–927 |
| 3 | Cathedral of the Holy Cross, Aghtamar Island | 927–947 |
| 4 | Argina | 947–992 |
| 5 | Ani | 992–1058 |
| 6 | Sebastia | 1058–1062 |
| 7 | Tavblur | 1062–1065 |
| 8 | Tsamndav | 1066–1090 |
| 9 | Kesun | 1090–1116 |
| 10 | Tsovk | 1116–1149 |
| 11 | Hromkla | 1149–1292 |
| 12 | Sis | 1293–1441 |
| 13 | Etchmiadzin Cathedral, Vagharshapat (Etchmiadzin) | 1441–present |

== See also ==
- Catholicos of All Armenians
