= Constantine Aspietes =

Byzantine general

Constantine Aspietes (Greek: Κωνσταντῖνος Ἀσπιέτης, fl. 1167–1190/1) was a Byzantine general active in the late 12th century.

A member of the Aspietes family, of noble Armenian origin, Constantine was probably a close relative of his contemporary Michael Aspietes, a distinguished general killed in 1176. Like his relative, Constantine too had earned distinction during Manuel I Komnenos' campaign against the Hungarians in 1167. The historian John Kinnamos records that he held the rank of sebastos. He is next recorded as being active in 1190/1, during the Byzantine efforts to suppress the Bulgarian–Vlach rebellion of the brothers Peter and Ivan Asen. The historian Niketas Choniates records that, in an effort to sustain the troops and bolster their morale, Aspietes decided to distribute to them their delayed annual salaries. This act, however, enraged Emperor Isaac II Angelos, who saw it as almost an attempt to bribe the army to support Aspietes in overthrowing him. The emperor had Aspietes arrested and blinded, after which nothing further is known of him. He possibly died in the early years of the 13th century.

== Sources ==
- Kazhdan, Alexander (1991). "Aspietes". In Kazhdan, Alexander (ed.). The Oxford Dictionary of Byzantium. Oxford and New York: Oxford University Press. pp. 211–212. ISBN 978-0-19-504652-6.
- Savvides, Alexis G. K. (1991). "Notes on the Armeno-Byzantine family of Aspietes, late 11th-early 13th centuries". Byzantinoslavica. 52. Prague: 70–79.
