= Ablgharib Artsruni =

Armenian governor of Cilicia

- Died: 1080; Paperon
- Occupations: Prince, magistros, governor of Cilicia
- Father: Hasan, son of Khatchik the Great

Ablgharib Artsruni (died 1080) was an Armenian prince, magistros and statesman who ruled as governor of Cilicia within the Byzantine Empire.

== Biography ==
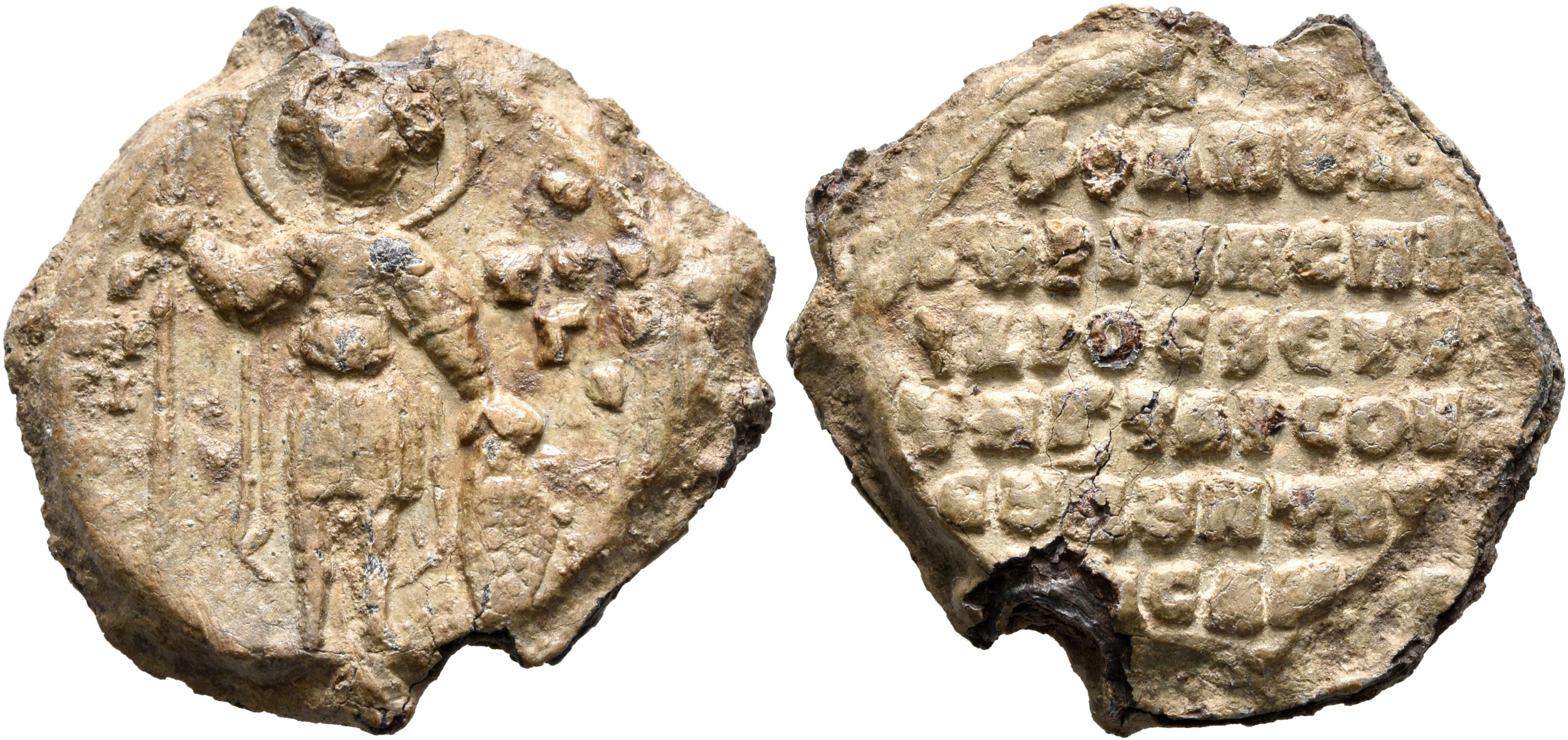
Seal of Ablgharib Artsruni

Ablgharib was born in the Kingdom of Vaspurakan to Hasan son of Khatchik the Great from the Artsruni dynasty. In 1021, King Senekerim-Hovhannes decided to cede his kingdom to the Byzantine Empire following devastating raids by Seljuq Turks, receiving Sebasteia and its territories extending to the Euphrates in return. Ablgharib later went to Constantinople, where he earned authority and trust in the Byzantine court during the reign of Emperor Constantine IX Monomachos, in which he also embraced the Orthodox Church. In 1042, he became ruler of Cilician regions including Taurus Mountains, Tarsus, Mopsuestia, Adana, Lampron and Paperon, making the latter his seat in his princely domain. Following the Battle of Manzikert, he became governor of Cilicia by Emperor Michael VII Doukas.

In 1073, Lambron was bequeathed as a hereditary estate to his kinsman, Prince Oshin, giving him his daughter in marriage. He also established in-law ties with Gagik II, marrying his other daughter to his son David who was later imprisoned then poisoned for treachery, according to Vardan Areveltsi. Ablgharib died in 1080 and was buried in Paperon.

A seal of Ablgharib was found near Tarsus, which represents Saint George with the inscription "Lord aid your servant Apnelgaripes magistros".

== Sources ==
- Boase, T.S.R. (1978). The Cilician kingdom of Armenia. Edinburgh: Scottish Academic Press. SBN 707301459.
- Bromige, Toby (2023). Armenians in the Byzantine Empire: Identity, Assimilation and Alienation from 867 to 1098. Bloomsbury Publishing. ISBN 9780755642434.
- Der Nersessian, Sirarpie (1947). Armenia and the Byzantine Empire: A Brief Study of Armenian Art and Civilization. Cambridge: Harvard University Press.
- Hazard, Harry W.; Wolff, Robert Lee (2017). A History of the Crusades, Volume 2: The Later Crusades, 1189-1311. University of Pennsylvania Press. ISBN 9781512819564.
- Matthew of Edessa (1993). Ara Edlllond Dostourtan (ed.). Armenia and the Crusades, Tenth to Twelfth Centuries: The Chronicle of Matthew of Edessa. Lanham, Maryland: University Press of America. ISBN 0-8191-8953-7.
