= Fortress of Kaysun =

- Adıyaman Province, Turkey

Site information
- Type: Fortress

Location
- Location of Fortress of Kaysun
- Location within Turkey
- Coordinates: 37°34′N 37°51′E

The Fortress of Kaysun (Turkish: Keysun Kalesi) is located near the village of Çakırhüyük, which used to be named Keysun, in the Adıyaman Province of rural southeastern Turkey.

== History ==
The fortress was a stronghold of the crusader County of Edessa, in which it was governed by Armenian ruler Kogh Vasil along with neighboring Raban. In 1116, King Baldwin II forced his adoptive son, Vasil Dgha, to renounce his domains.

In 1131, the Danishmend Emir Gazi besieged the place in which Joscelin I, Count of Edessa, had installed the Jacobite Patriarch of Antioch. Though Joscelin was dying at that time, he was carried on a litter ahead of his army to relieve the castle. Upon hearing news of Joscelin's approach, Emir Ghazi abandoned the siege.

The fortress was demolished by Kilij Arslan II sometime after 1177 and its inhabitants were carried into captivity.

== Sources ==
- Runciman, Steven (1989). A History of the Crusades, Volume II: The Kingdom of Jerusalem and the Frankish East, 1100-1187. Cambridge University Press. ISBN 0-521-06162-8.
- Vryonis, Speros (1971). The Decline of Medieval Hellenism in Asia Minor and the Process of Islamization from the Eleventh through the Fifteenth Century. University of California Press. ISBN 0-520-01597-5.
