= Parsegh of Cilicia =

Basil of Ani or Basil Pahlavuni (Barsegh or Parsegh, Armenian: Բարսեղ Անեցի Barseł Anecʻi, Բարսեղ Պահլաւունի Barseł Pahlawuni; died 13 November 1113) was Armenian Catholicos of Cilicia from 1105 to 1113. He was a member of the Pahlavuni noble house and a nephew of Catholicos Gregory II. In 1070, Gregory II made him bishop of Ani with the responsibilities of a vicar of the catholicos. In 1081, with Gregory's agreement, Catholicos Stepanos of Albania officially consecrated Basil as coadjutor of the Catholicos of Armenia at Haghpat Monastery. At this time, the Armenian Church was effectively divided between four leaders: Gregory II, Theodorus in Honi, Basil in Ani and Paul in Marash. In 1090, Basil visited the Seljuk sultan Malik-Shah I, who eased the Armenians' tax burden and recognized the supremacy of the Catholicosate of Ani, after which Basil deposed the catholicos based in Honi in Cilicia. After becoming catholicos in 1105, he took up his seat at Karmir Vank in Tsamndav. Almost is nothing is known about his patriarchate. He is said to have effectively governed the church and maintained its unity despite the chaotic times and the dispersion of the Armenian people. He died during a pilgrimage to Jerusalem in 1113 and was buried at Karmir Vank. He was succeeded by his relative Gregory III Pahlavuni as catholicos.

Preceded by Gregory II the Martyrophile	Catholicos of the Holy See of Cilicia; 1105–1113	Succeeded by Gregory III of Cilicia
