= Oshin of Lampron =

Armenian nakharar

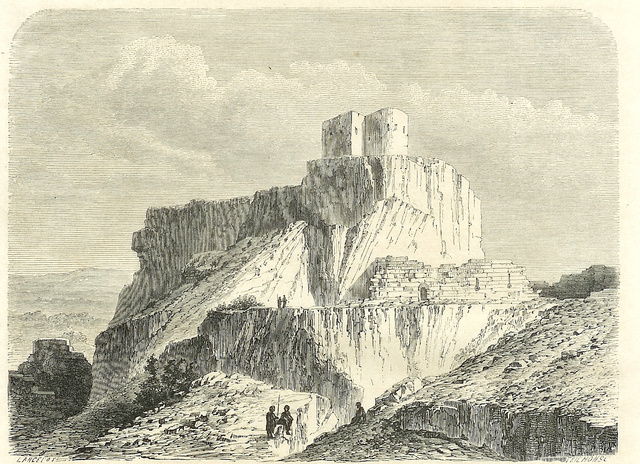
19th-century view of castle Lampron by Victor Langlois

Oshin of Lampron (Armenian: Օշին Լամբրոնացի - Oshin Lambronatsi) was an Armenian nakharar. Historical sources mentioned that he was a lord of a fortress near the city of Ganja (modern-day Azerbaijan), who migrated in the early 1070s to Cilicia and founded the House of Lampron that ruled the Armenian Kingdom of Cilicia in the 12th and 13th centuries.

According to Cyril Toumanoff, Oshin was a member of the Pahlavuni clan. Disappointed with the inability of the Byzantines to protect him against the advance of the Seljuk Turks, Oshin fled west from his fortress near Ganja to Cilicia in 1072. The 12th century chronicler Samuel of Ani wrote about Oshin's departure from his ancestral lands: "...with his brother Halgam, with his wife and other nobles. Carrying his wealth and the finger of the holy apostle Peter, he entered Cilicia and captured from the Muslims the fortress of Lampron, at the foot of the Taurus Mountains toward Tarsus." His kinsman, Ablgharib Artsruni, governed Taurus and Mopsuestia in the name of the Emperor Constantine IX Monomachos. He ceded to Oshin two forts in western Cilicia, Lampron and Barbaron at Tarsus near the Cilician Gates. While Samuel of Ani implies that Oshin seized Lampron from Muslims, other Armenian writers closer to the Hethumids suggest that Oshin was merely a faithful chieftain of Abulgharib who later ceded the castle of Lampron to him. Matthew of Edessa and Sempad the Constable mention Oshin only in passing. The Emperor had no objection to seeing the Armenians becoming a buffer between him and the invading Seljuks; and confirmed Oshin, together with two other Armenian leaders who had established themselves in the Taurus, Ruben and Kogh Vasil, in their positions by bestowing on them the imperial title of sebastos.

Oshin has been identified by historians such as Steven Runciman with general Michael Aspietes, whose exploits were told by Anna Comnena in her Alexiad as well as with Ursinus mentioned by Ralph of Caen (in Gesta Tancredi) and Albert of Aix. Historian Joseph Laurent argued that Ursinus, Aspietes and Oshin were all different people in his article Arméniens de Cilicie: Aspiétès, Oschin, Ursinus from the journal Revue des Études Arméniennes; however, Christopher Macevitt found the links between Ursinus and Oshin persuasive and compelling. In September 1097 when Baldwin of Boulogne took Tarsus from Tancred who had recently captured the city, Oshin/Ursinus sent ambassadors to Tancred advising him to attack Mamistra. Oshin was thus in a position to support either Baldwin or Tancred. Once the Crusaders moved on to Antioch, Oshin provided them with provisions, eager to have them leave Cilicia.

== Issue ==
He married a daughter of Abu'lgharib Artsruni, governor of Tarsus, and had issue:

- Héthoum II († 1143), lord of Lampron
  - Oshin II (1125 † 1170), lord of Lampron
  - Smbat († 1153), lord of Baberon
    - Vasak († after 1199), lord of Baberon
      - Constantine (1180 † 1263), lord of Baberon.
