= Kogh Vasil =

Ruler of Raban and Kaisun until 1112

Kogh Vasil Գող Վասիլ
- Successor: Vasil Dgha
- Died: 12 October 1112
- Burial: Red Monastery of Kaysun
- Issue: Vasil Dgha (adopted)
- House: Clan of Ghazarik
- Father: Ghazar
- Religion: Armenian Apostolic Church

Kogh Vasil, or Vasil the Robber (Armenian: Գող Վասիլ; died on 12 October 1112), was the Armenian ruler of Raban and Kaisun at the time of the First Crusade.

== Biography ==
=== Origins ===
The father of Kogh Vasil was the brigand leader Łazarik (Ghazar, i.e. Lazarus), called the "red-haired dog", who was first mentioned in an epistle of Grigor Magistros to the Syrian Patriarch in 1058. Bar Hebraeus and Michael the Syrian mention that around the same time, the clan of Ghazarik had established itself in Claudia and Qubbos on the Euphrates from where they pillaged local monasteries such as the Mor Bar Sauma Monastery. They eventually retreated upon the Seljuq invasions in the Melitene territory into the mountains in August 1066.

=== Establishment of dominion ===
Philaretos Brachamios, the ruler of an Armenian principality centered around Antioch, Edessa and Marash, gave Kogh Vasil the fortress of Kaisun. After the death of Philaretos, he gained control over several other places such as Hromgla, Raban, Tall Bashar and Bira. In the early 12th century, Kogh Vasil was the most influential Armenian ruler who adhered to the Armenian Apostolic Church. He was a major power in the region and had vassals such as Ablgharib, lord of al-Bira.

Although Kogh seems to have been from humble origins, he claimed the heritage and authority of the Armenian kingdom through his wife, who according to Matthew of Edessa was descendent from the Kamsarakan family. Finally, he also became a protector of the Pahlavuni Armenian Patriarchs and Grigor II took up residence in Kaisun at some time before he died in 1106.

=== Contact with the Crusaders ===
Kogh's brother was Bagrat who influenced Baldwin of Boulogne to depart from the army of the First Crusade and venture into the Armenian controlled lands. Once Baldwin and Bagrat fell out, he was forced to submit to their rule and Baldwin's brother Godfrey seized one of his fortresses. Nevertheless, he seems to have arranged with the Franks and been instrumental in arranging the ransom for Bohemond of Taranto when he was captured by the Danishmendids, later even adopting him. He sought to maintain good relations with the Byzantines, Franks and the Turks and was able to defeated the Shah-Armens Sökmen el-Kutbî in 1109.

He was succeeded by his adopted son, Vasil Dgha, under whose rule the principality of Kogh Vasil fell apart.

== Sources ==
- Dadoyan, Seta B. (1 November 2012). The Armenians in the Medieval Islamic World: Armenian Realpolitik in the Islamic World and Diverging Paradigmscase of Cilicia Eleventh to Fourteenth C. Transaction Publishers. ISBN 978-1-4128-4782-7.
- MacEvitt, Christopher (2010). The Crusades and the Christian World of the East: Rough Tolerance. University of Pennsylvania Press. ISBN 978-0-8122-4050-4.
- Morton, Nicholas (April 2020). The Crusader States and their Neighbours: A Military History, 1099-1187. Oxford University Press. ISBN 9780192557988.
- Runciman, Steven (1989a). A History of the Crusades, Volume I: The First Crusade and the Foundations of the Kingdom of Jerusalem. Cambridge University Press. ISBN 0-521-06161-X.
- Runciman, Steven (1989b). A History of the Crusades, Volume II: The Kingdom of Jerusalem and the Frankish East, 1100-1187. Cambridge University Press. ISBN 0-521-06162-8.
