= Catholicos of All Armenians =

Head of the Armenian Apostolic Church

Ամենայն Հայոց Կաթողիկոս Catholicos of All Armenians
- Bishopric

Oriental Orthodox
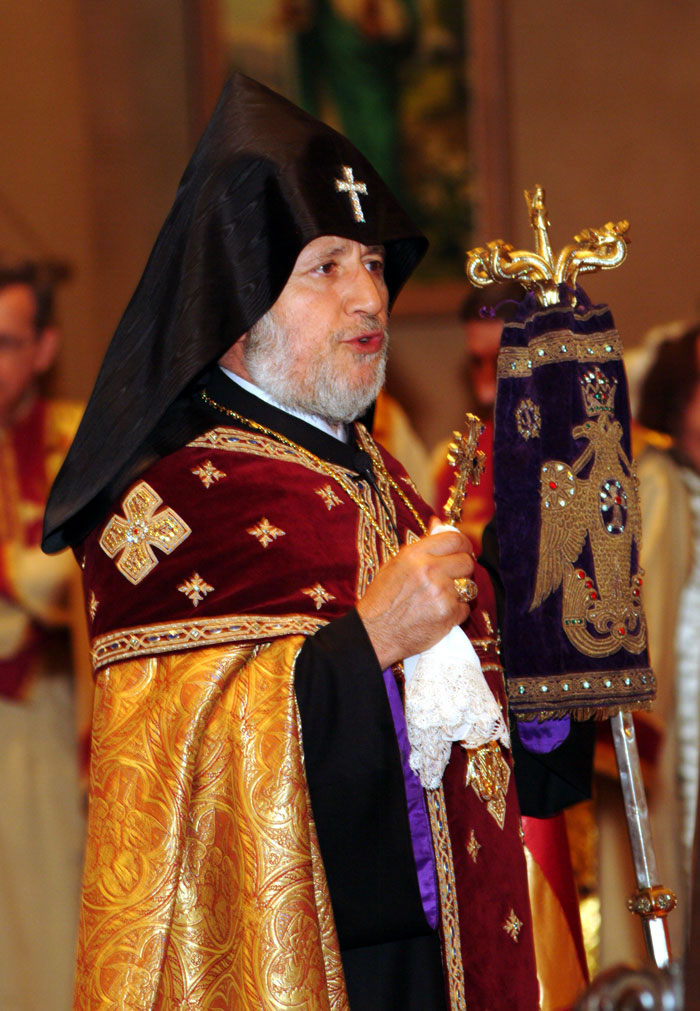

- Karekin II's coat of arms
- Incumbent; Karekin II since 4 November 1999
- Style: His Holiness

Information
- First holder: Saint Gregory the Illuminator
- Established: 301
- Diocese: Mother See of Holy Etchmiadzin
- Cathedral: Etchmiadzin Cathedral, Vagharshapat, Armavir Province, Armenia

Website
- www.armenianchurch.org

The Catholicos of All Armenians (Armenian: Ամենայն Հայոց Կաթողիկոս) is the chief bishop and spiritual leader of Armenia's national church, the Armenian Apostolic Church, and the worldwide Armenian diaspora. The Armenian Catholicos (plural Catholicoi) is also known as the Armenian Pontiff (Վեհափառ, Vehapar or Վեհափառ Հայրապետ, Vehapar Hayrapet) and by other titles. According to tradition, the apostles Saint Thaddeus and Saint Bartholomew brought Christianity to Armenia in the first century. Saint Gregory the Illuminator became the first Catholicos of All Armenians following the nation's adoption of Christianity as its state religion in 301 AD. The seat of the Catholicos, and the spiritual and administrative headquarters of the Armenian Church, is the Mother See of Holy Etchmiadzin, located in the city of Vagharshapat.

The Armenian Apostolic Church is part of the Oriental Orthodox communion. This communion includes the Coptic Orthodox Church of Alexandria, the Ethiopian Orthodox Tewahedo Church, the Syriac Orthodox Church, the Malankara Orthodox Syrian Church, and the Eritrean Orthodox Tewahedo Church.

The incumbent Catholicos of the Armenian Church has been Karekin II since 1999.

== Other names ==
The Catholicos is often referred to both by the church and the media as the Armenian Pontiff. Historically, the Catholicos was known in English and other languages as the Armenian Patriarch or the Patriarch of Armenia, and sometimes as the Patriarch of Etchmiadzin (or Echmiadzin) to distinguish from the Armenian Patriarch of Constantinople and the Armenian Patriarch of Jerusalem. To distinguish from the Catholicos (or Patriarch) of Cilicia, historically based in Sis and now in Antelias (Lebanon), he may be referred to as the Catholicos of Etchmiadzin. To underscore his supremacy over other patriarchs, the Catholicos is sometimes referred to in English as the Armenian Pope.

== See also ==
- Seats of the Catholicos of Armenians
- Holy See of Cilicia
- List of catholicoi of all Armenians
- List of Armenian catholicoi of Cilicia
