= Church of the Holy Cross at Soradir =

Former Armenian Church in Turkey

Monastery of the Holy Cross at Soradir or Dzoradir ՁՈՐԱԴԻՐԻ Սբ. ԷՋՄԻԱԾԻՆ վանք
- Location within Turkey

Religion
- Affiliation: Armenian Apostolic Church
- District: Başkale
- Province: Van Province
- Region: Eastern Anatolia region
- Status: Ceased functioning as a monastery in 1915

Location
- Location: Turkey
- Coordinates: 38.262670°N 44.252582°E

Architecture
- Style: Armenian
- Completed: 6th century

The Church of the Holy Cross at Soradir is a 6th-century Armenian monastic complex in south-eastern Turkey. It is situated in the village of Yanal near the town and district of Başkale in Van Province.

== History ==
The Monastery of the Holy Cross at Soradir or Dzoradir (Armenian: ՁՈՐԱԴԻՐԻ Սբ. ԷՋՄԻԱԾԻՆ վանք) was built in the 6th century by the apprentice of the architect of the Saint Bartholomew Monastery; the site corresponds to a settlement in the Metz Aghbak district of Vaspurakan province of historical Armenia. According to Armenian inscriptions found inside the main church, in 582 with the sponsorship of Saro Mahtesi the church's dome and western threshold were reconstructed. In the 10th century, the Armenian king Gagik I Artsruni entrusted the architect Manuel to build the Saint Cross of Akhtamar monastery copying the design of the Dzoradir monastery. It was a functioning Armenian monastery until the Armenian genocide in 1915.

== Current condition ==
After the Armenian genocide, the monastery has sat in an abandoned state, and only one graffitied and derelict church building remains extant.
