= Hogots Monastery =

Former Armenian monastery in Turkey

- Հոգոց վանք; Hogots Manastırı
- Location within Turkey

Religion
- Affiliation: Armenian Apostolic Church
- Status: Ceased functioning as a monastery in 1915

Location
- Location: Gürpınar district, Van Province, Turkey
- Coordinates: 38°5′57.9″N 43°24′15.3″E

Architecture
- Type: Church
- Style: Armenian
- Completed: 4th century

Hogots Monastery is a ruin of an Armenian monastery in the western Gürpınar district of modern Turkey. Built in the 4th century, it ceased functioning as a monastery after the Armenian genocide in 1915. It is situated 5.3 kilometres (3.3 mi) northwest of Özlüce village in the district.

== Etymology ==
Hogots Monastery (Armenian: Հոգոց վանք, Hogots vank) is Armenian for Monastery of the Holy Spirit.

== History ==
According to Movses Khorenatsi, Bartholomew the Apostle had an Anahit temple demolished near where Hogots was eventually built, and brought an image of the Virgin Mary that was probably held inside St. Astvatsatsin Church within Hogarts. Gregory the Illuminator had a chapel of Saint Zion built in the same area, which, according to legend, is the burial site of Tiridates III, his sister Khosrovidukht, and his wife Ashkhen. Tovma Artsruni mentions that Hogarts monastery was completed in the 4th century. Hogots monastery was one of the few notable monasteries of Historical Armenia's Antzevasiq district, which was a part of the larger province of Vaspurakan. Similar to Saint Bartholomew Monastery, Hogots monastery was a pilgrimage site for Armenians from the Lake Van region. In the seventeenth century, it became the main religious building of the Norduz district of the Vilayet of Van in the Ottoman Empire, including for composition of manuscripts. Hogarts was renovated between 1730 and 1765.

During the Hamidian Massacres in 1895, Hogarts and 50 other monasteries were looted and destroyed in the province of Lake Van. The Hogots monastery was renovated in 1904. It was abandoned during the Armenian Genocide in 1915.

In November 2021, local thieves conducted vandalism, which involved theft of materials and deliberate destruction. The incident was reported by Ali Kalchik, head of the Van ÇEVDER Historical Monuments Protection Union. There has been localized exploitation during the broad Turkish governmental indifference toward Armenian sites in eastern Anatolia, where such heritage rarely receive safeguarding against illegal activity.

== Layout ==
Hogarts Monestary is a stone fortress surrounded by two walls, the outer of which is rectangular and 46 by 43 metres (151 ft × 141 ft) in size and 7–8 metres (23–26 ft) tall. Five semicircular towers were situated at the corners and near the entrance along the western wall. It has a labyrinthine layout that featured a citadel in the northwest, two courtyards, a sixth tower near the middle, auxiliary rooms between the two walls on the east side, and the church building where the Virgin Mary image was probably hosted. The church has a single nave along the long axis of the monastery, and in front there was a clock tower and an area through a wide arch which was likely the chapel of Saint Zion. A second church with a similar plan, Saint Hovhannes, was located near the main church. Both churches and the clock tower had domed roofs.
