= Güroluk =

Güroluk can refer to:

- Güroluk, Başkale
- Güroluk, Bismil
