= Karmravank =

Monastery in Gevaş, Van, Turkey

Karmravank Կարմրավանք
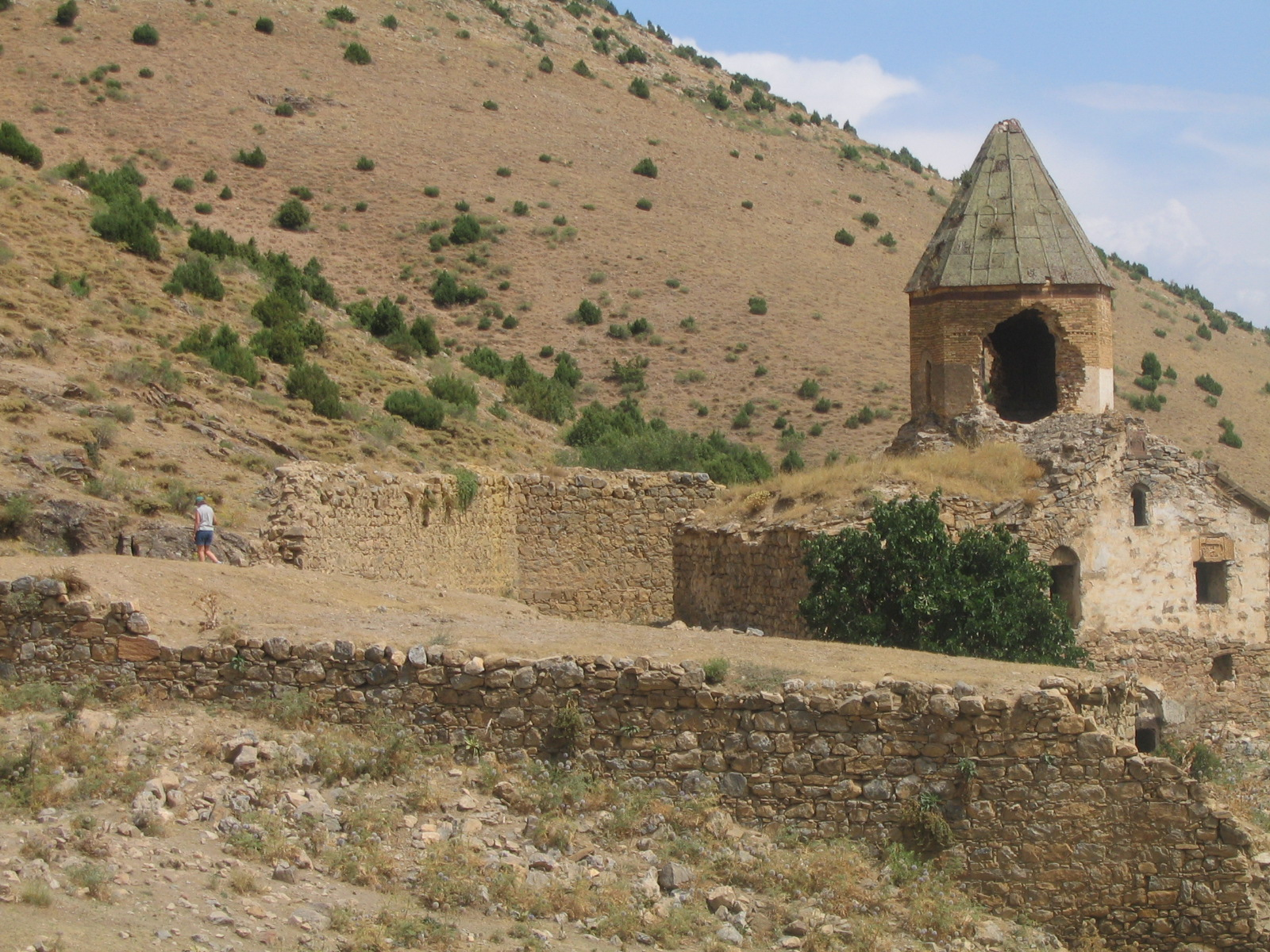
- Karmravank in Summer 2006

- Location within Turkey

Religion
- Affiliation: Armenian Apostolic Church
- Status: abandoned

Location
- Location: southern shore of Lake Van
- Coordinates: 38.372315°N 42.904281°E

Architecture
- Style: Armenian
- Groundbreaking: tenth century

Karmravank (Armenian: Կարմրավանք, meaning Red Monastery) is an abandoned 10th century Armenian monastery in the Vaspurakan province of historic Armenia (now in the Van Province of Turkey). It was founded by King Gagik I (908–943) of the Artsruni dynasty. It is located 12 kilometers west-northwest of Akdamar Island.

Completed in the 10th century AD, the Red Monastery ceased functioning as a monastery due to the Armenian genocide in the Ottoman Empire which began in 1915. It got ruined and now only concists of the Holy Cross church.

== History ==
The monastery is also known as Karmrakvank, Kamrakvank and Göründü Kilise, after the nearby village of Göründü, and stands at the upper end of a small valley that descends to the shore of Lake Van. Little is known about its history, and its foundation by Gagik Artsruni rests on tradition. The complex has two churches. The main church, Surp Astvadzadzin (Holy Mother of God), is rectangular externally and has a dome on a tall drum, capped on the exterior by an octagonal pyramid of stone slabs.

Inside, a barrel-vaulted space leads to a square bay under the dome and a semicircular apse lit by a narrow window. Jean-Michel Thierry, who published a study of the monastery in 1967, noted similar plans in several nearby churches and suggested they might represent a form distinctive to the Van region. He also proposed that the north church was older than the south church and, from a manuscript colophon mentioning a "Holy Sign" called Karmrak, that the smaller church was named Surp Nishan.

== Gallery ==
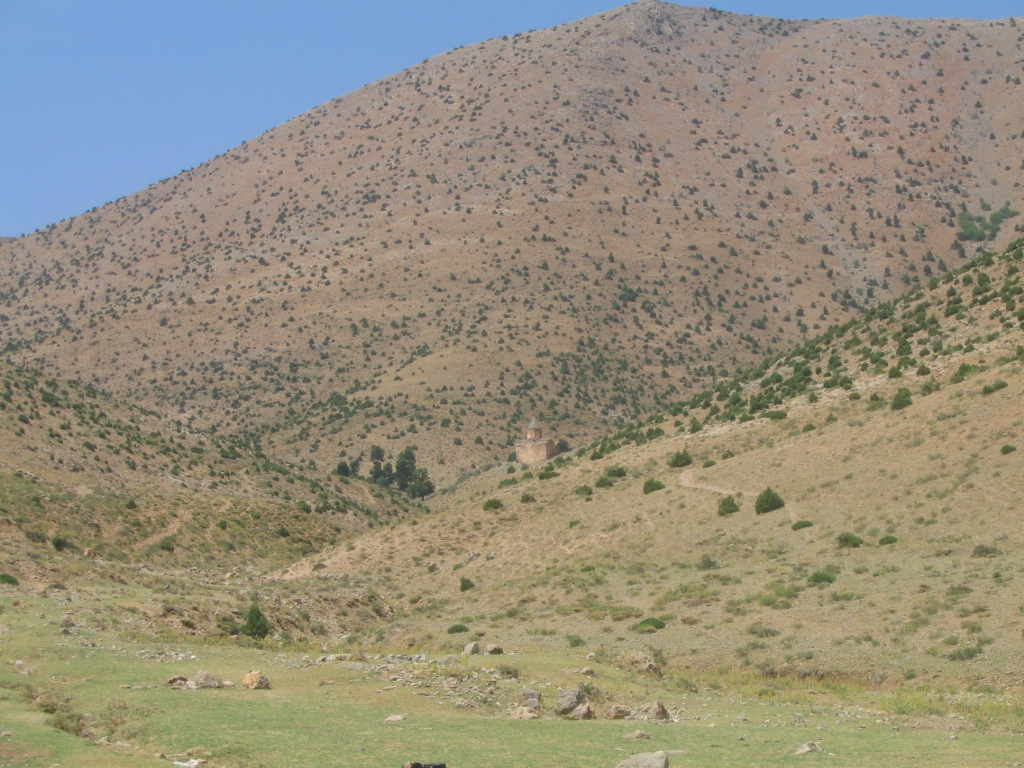
Karmravank in its natural setting

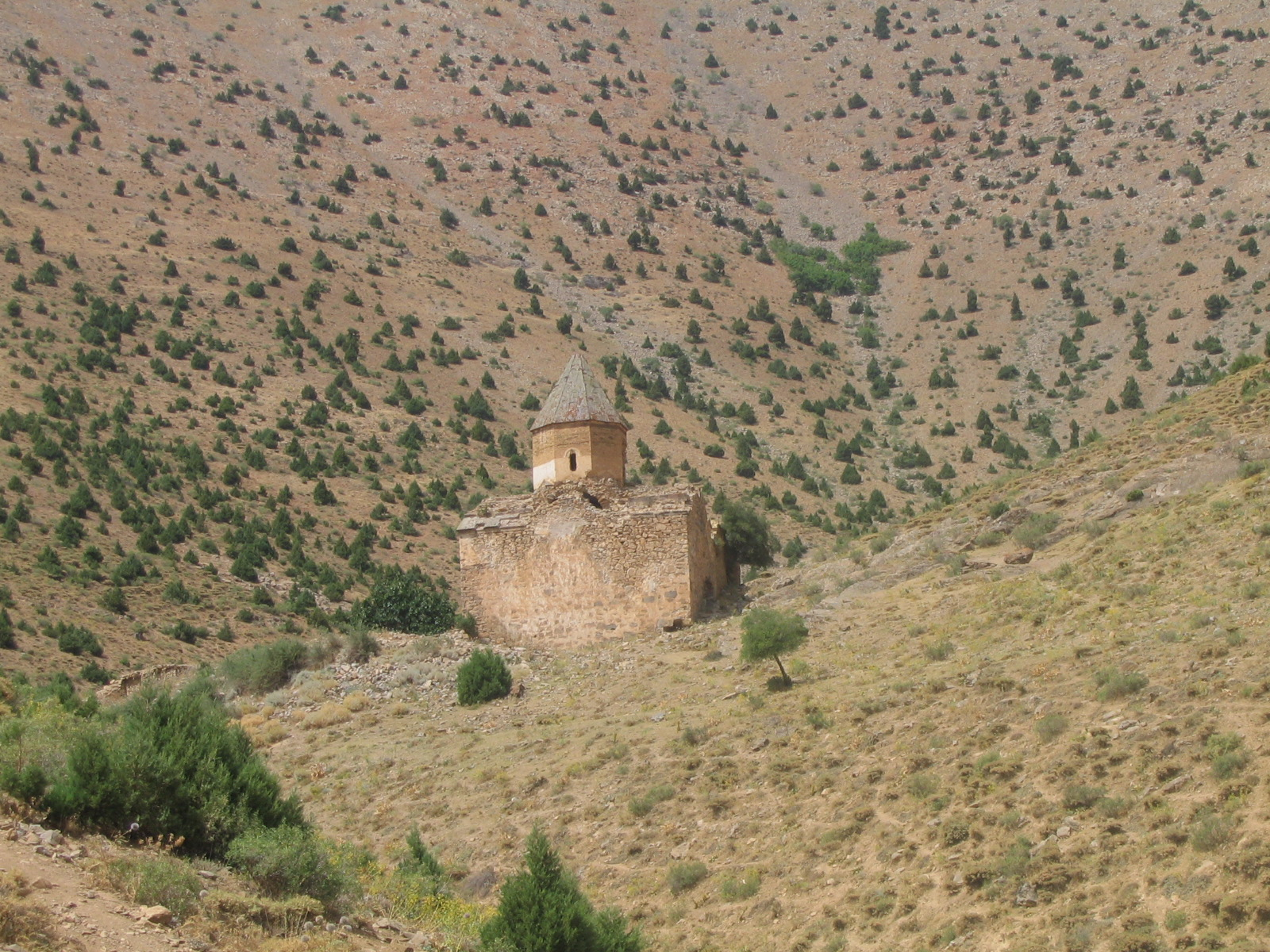
View of the church from the south

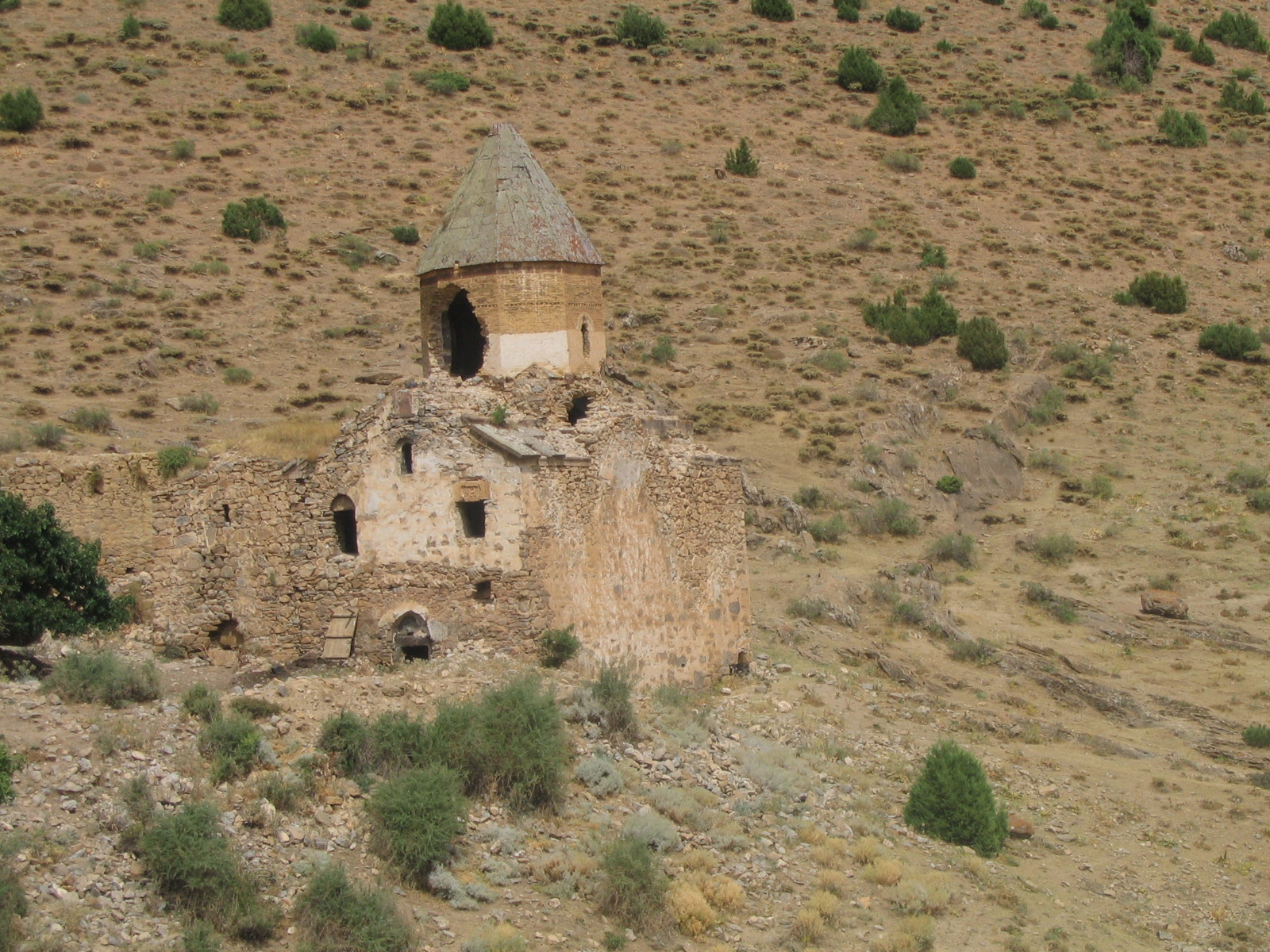
View of the church from the south-west

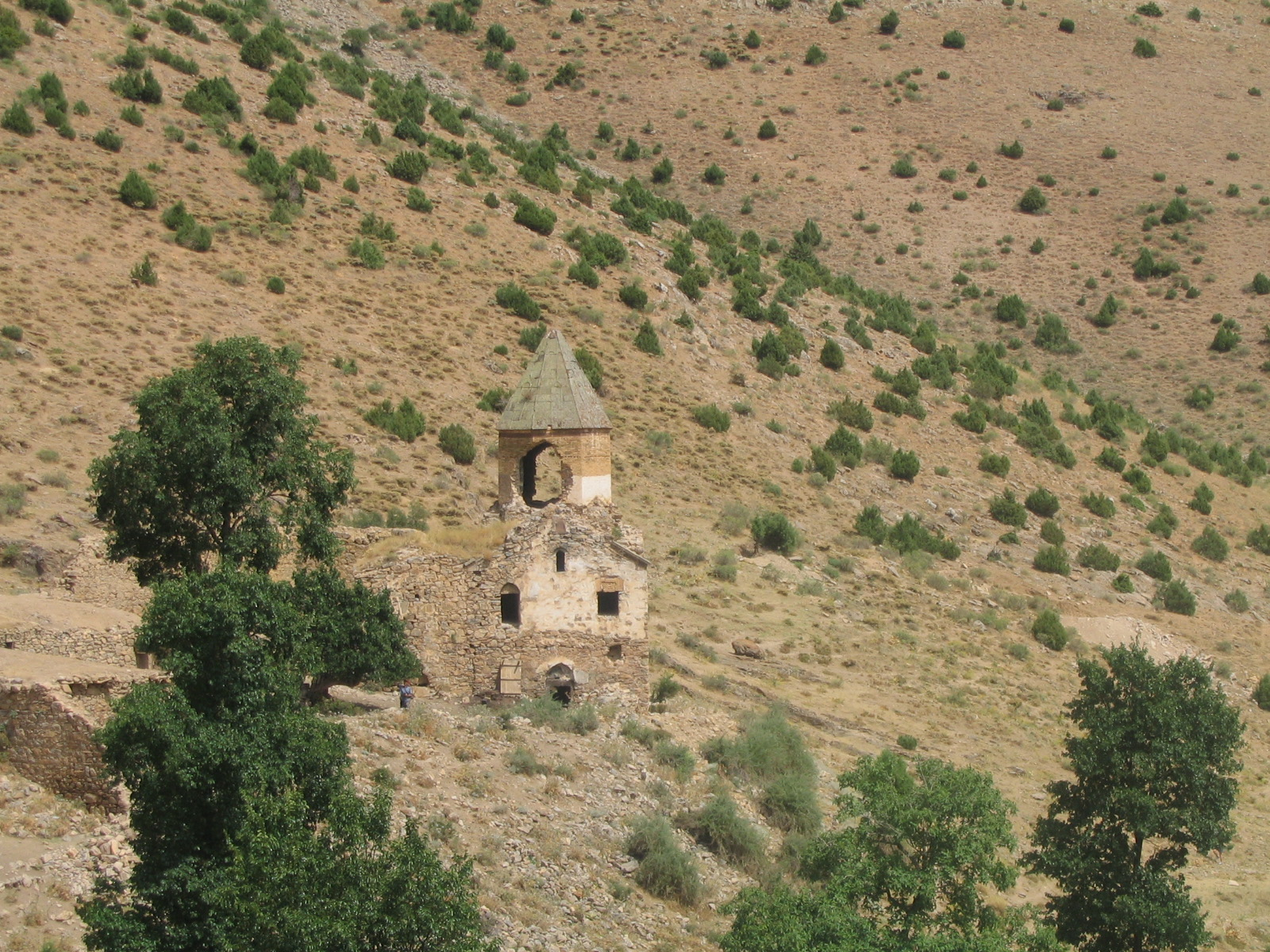
View of church from the west

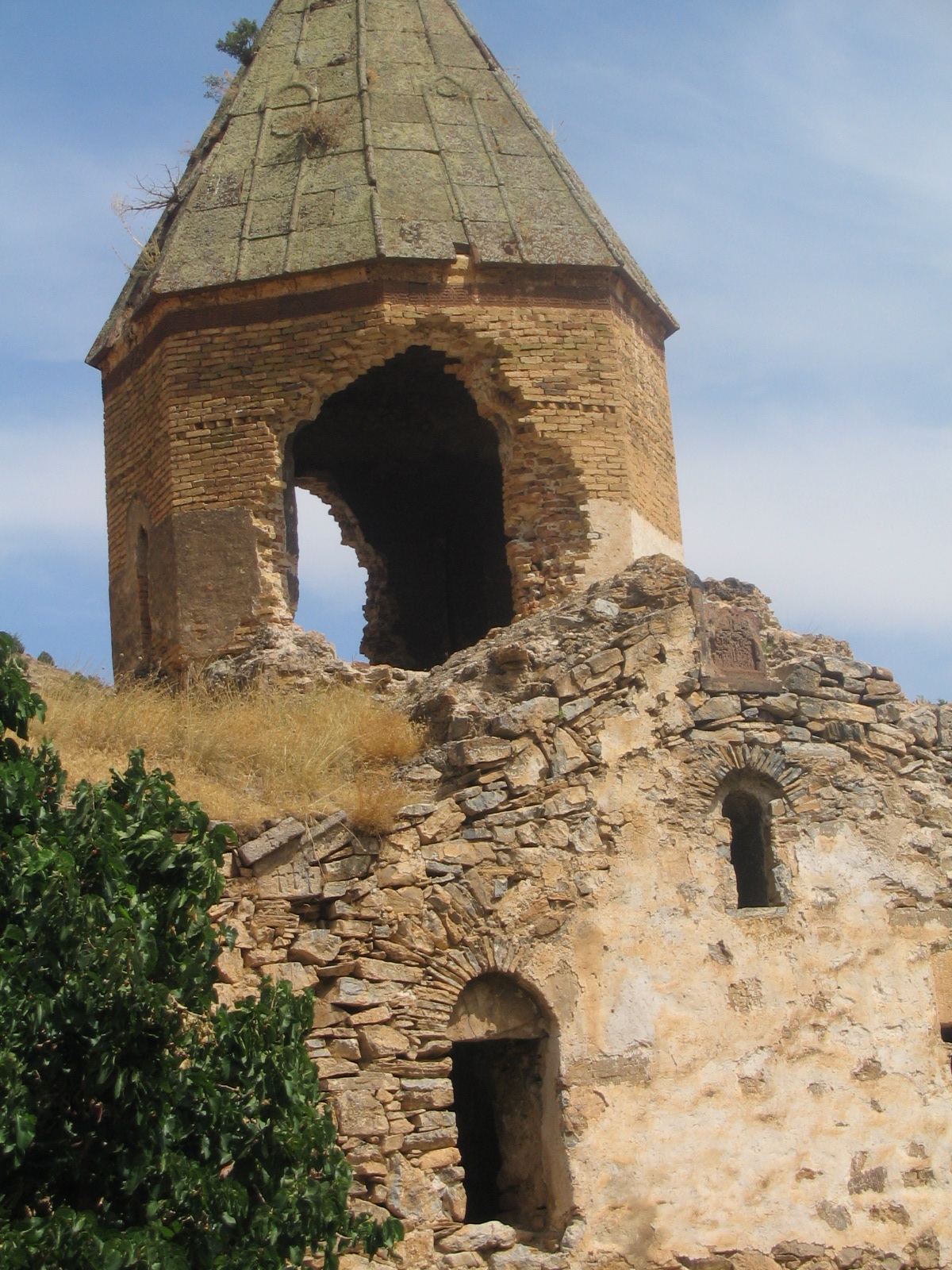
Closeup of the damaged dome

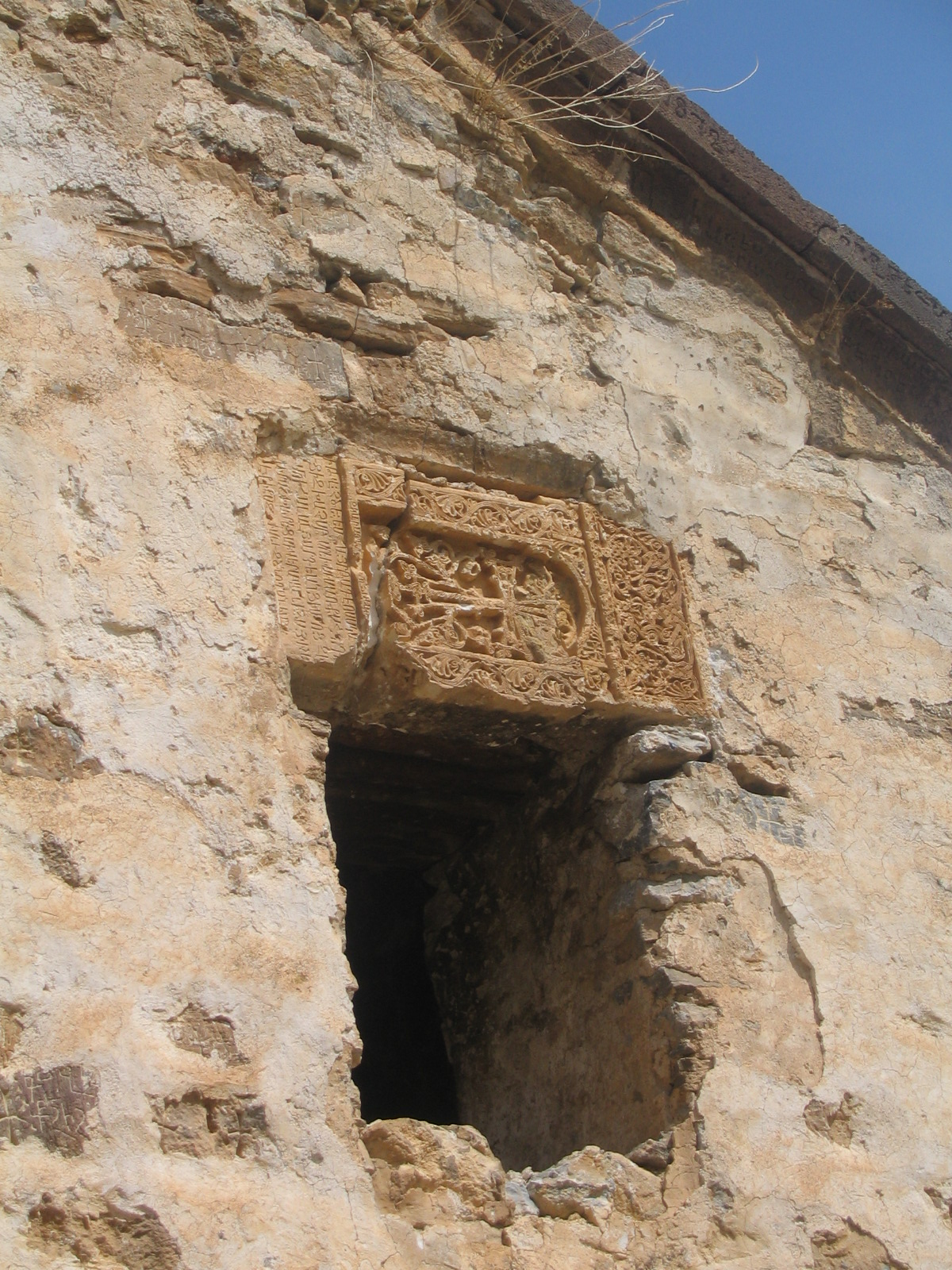
An Armenian khachkar reused as a lintel

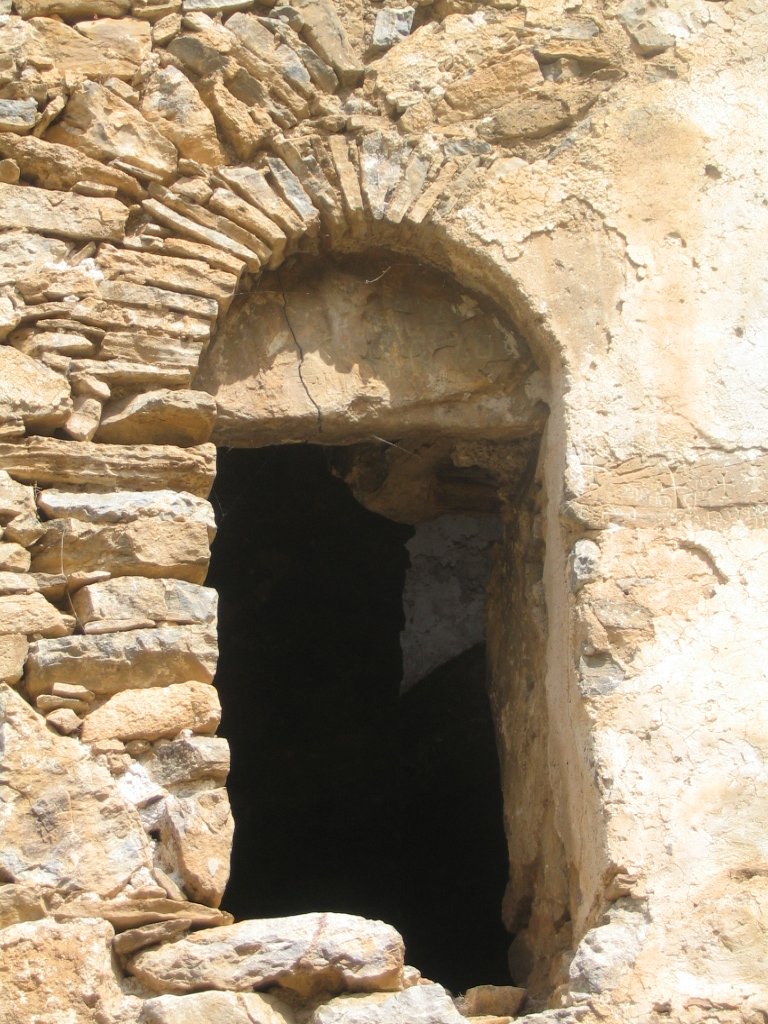
Upper level doorway leading to the north-west gallery

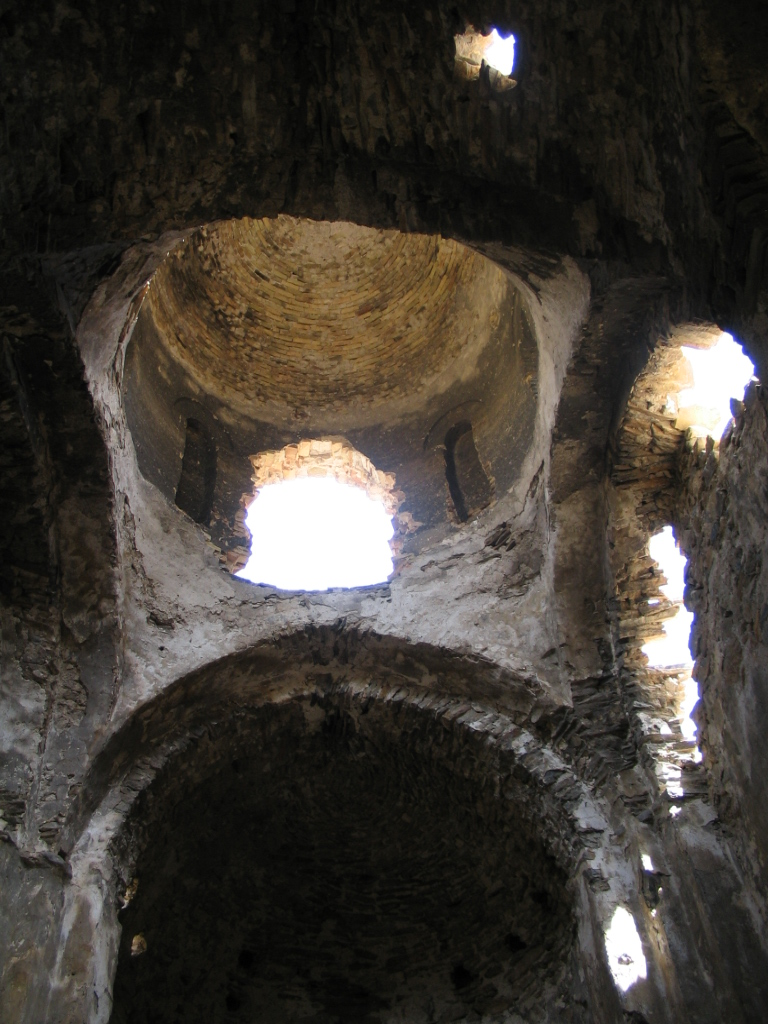
Drum of the church and its supporting vaults

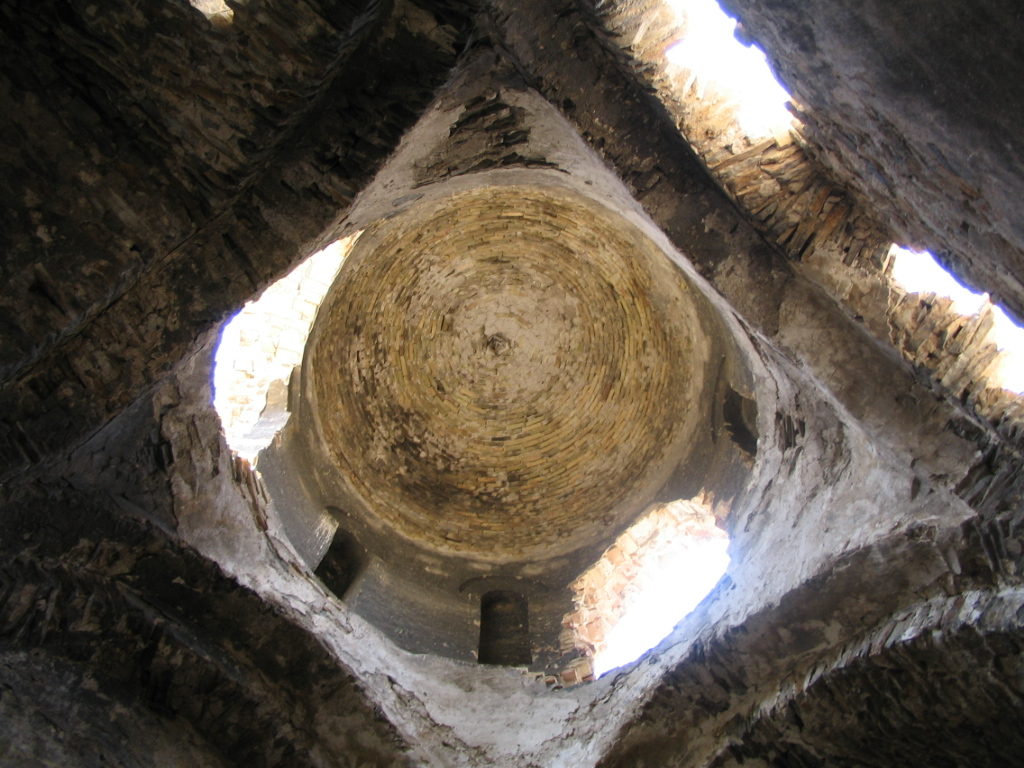
View of dome from the inside

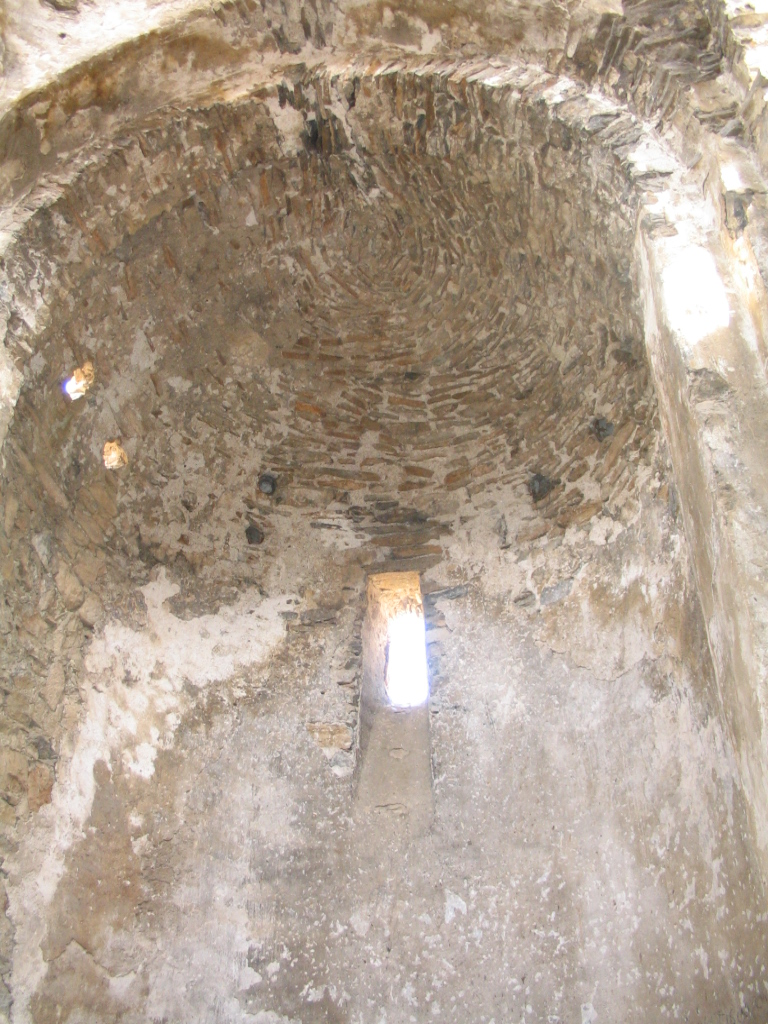
The apse of the church

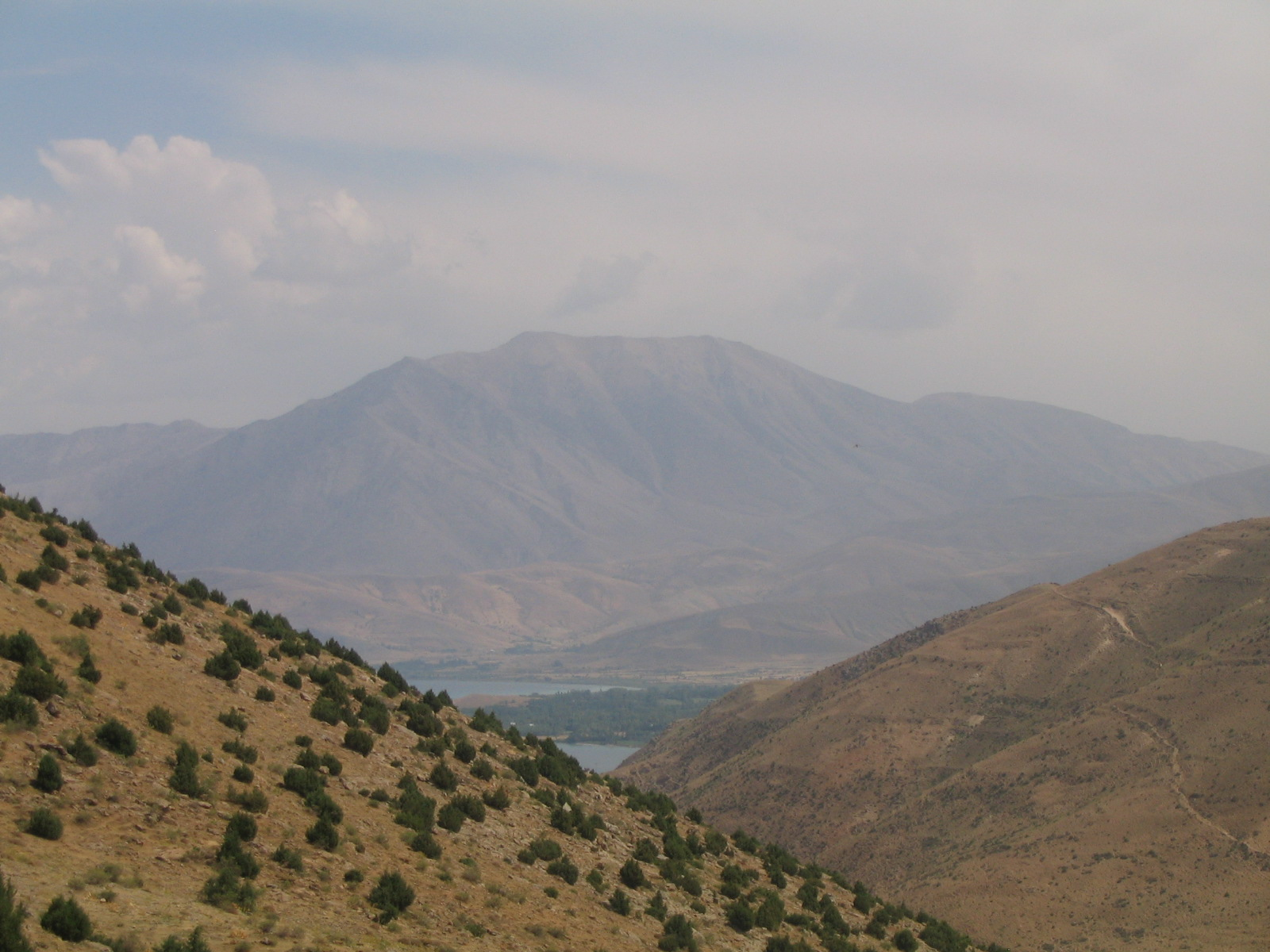
View of Lake Van and Mount Artos seen from the monastery

== See also ==
- Narekavank, a nearby 10th century Armenian monastery also founded by King Gagik
