= Vaspurakan =

Province of the ancient kingdom of Armenia

Coordinates: 38.8°N 44.0°E

Vaspurakan Վասպուրական
- Province of the ancient kingdom of Armenia
- 189 BC–428 AD
- Capital: Van
- History
  - Artaxias I declaring himself independent: 189 BC
  - Annexed by Sassanid Empire: 428 AD
- Today part of: Turkey; Iran; Nakhchivan

Vaspurakan (Armenian: Վասպուրական, Western Armenian pronunciation: Vasbouragan) was the eighth province of the ancient kingdom of Armenia, which later became an independent kingdom during the Middle Ages, centered on Lake Van. Located in what is now southeastern Turkey and northwestern Iran, the region is considered to be the cradle of Armenian civilization.

== Name ==
The name Vaspurakan is of Iranian origin. It is related of the Middle Persian word vāspuhr, meaning "senior, heir, prince". In Middle Persian, vāspuhrakān referred to the top nobility of the Sasanian Empire. In Armenian, vaspurakan was also rarely used as an adjective meaning "noble"; for example, vaspurakan gund ("army/troop of nobles"). Thus, Vaspurakan can be translated as "noble land" or "land of princes". Alternative interpretations of the name include "having a special position" or "royal domain". Heinrich Hübschmann considered it likely that the name originated as a shortening of the koghmn Vaspurakan Gndin ("land of the army/troop of nobles") mentioned by the 7th-century historian Sebeos.

Some scholars believe that Vaspurakan is mentioned by Strabo as Basoropeda (Ancient Greek: Βασοροπέδα). Hübschmann argues that if the province was already commonly called Vaspurakan by Strabo's time (1st century BC-1st century AD), then it should also be found in the works of the early Armenian historians, but it is not mentioned by most of them. Movses Khorenatsi (traditionally dated to the 5th century) is the first to refer to the province by that name, and only on one occasion. Later Armenian historians (e.g. Łewond, Hovhannes Draskhanakerttsi, Tovma Artsruni) refer to the province more frequently, especially after the emergence of the Artsruni-ruled principality in Vaspurakan. It is attested in Arabic sources as Basfurrajān.

== History ==
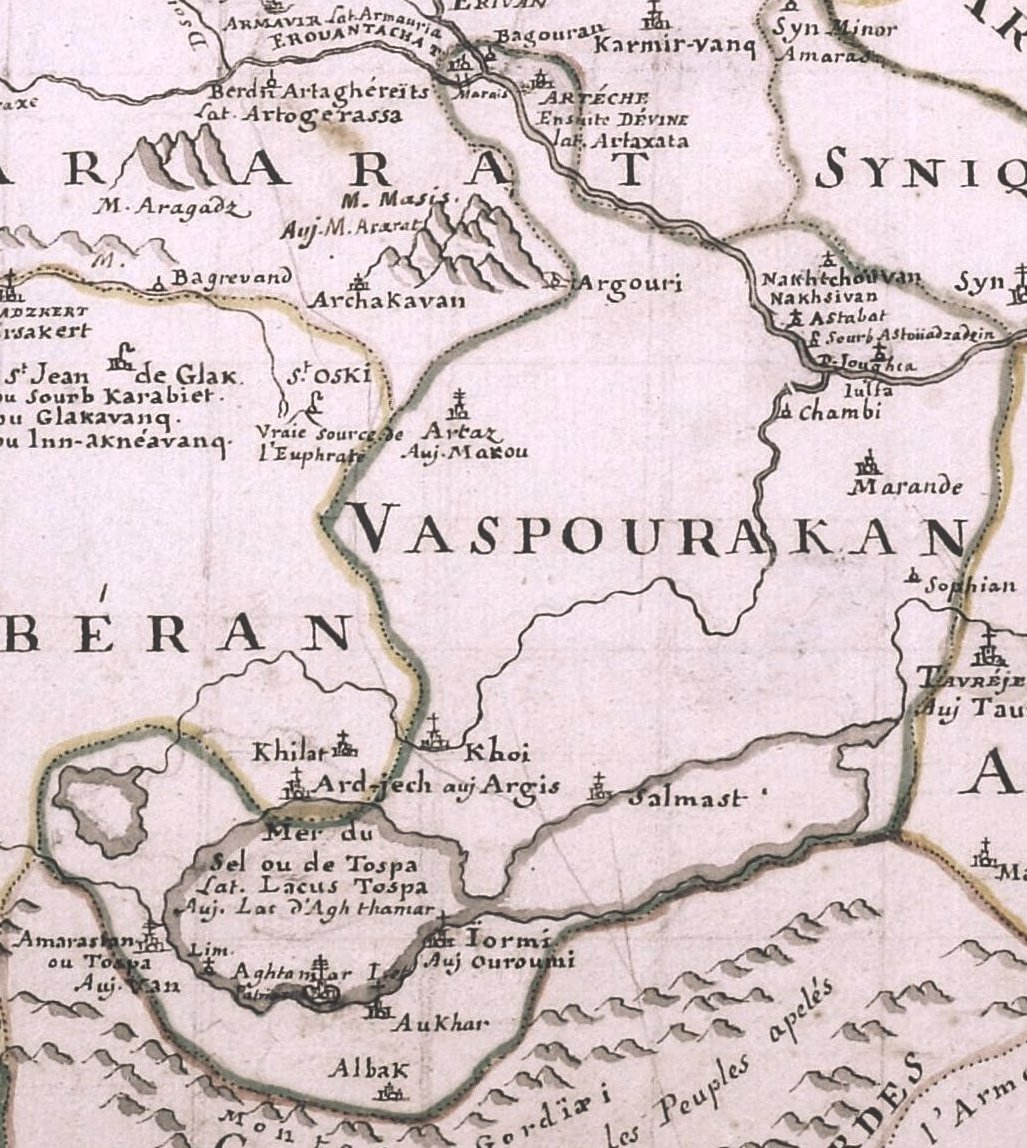
Vaspurakan 1788, by unknown French cartographer

From the 9th century BC, Vaspurakan was part of Urartu. In the 6th century BC, it became part of Satrapy of Armenia. From 189 BC, it became one of Greater Armenia's provinces. Then it became part of Arsacid dynasty of Armenia. After the division of 387, it was included into Persian Armenia. In the 8th century, it fell under Arab control. Many rebellions took place in Vaspurakan. In 885, within the territory of Kingdom of Armenia, it became free.

During most of its history, it was ruled by the Ardzruni dynasty, which first managed to create a principality in the area. At its greatest extent Vaspurakan comprised the lands between Lake Van and Lake Urmia (also known as Kaputan) in 908. In 908 Gagik I of Vaspurakan was recognized King of Armenia by the Abbasid Caliph in competition to the Bagratids, but soon he was reconciled with Ashot II, who recognized him as the King of Vaspurakan. In 1021, Seneqerim Ardzruni gave Vaspurakan to the Byzantine Empire, receiving estates in Sebasteia and surroundings in exchange.

After Vaspurakan was ceded to the Byzantine Empire (Vasprakia Βασπρακία, in Byzantine Greek), it was conquered by Seljuq Turks. Later it was ruled by Ahlatshahs, Ayyubids and Sultanate of Rum successively. In the beginning of the 13th century, part of Vaspurakan was liberated by the Zakarians, but was then conquered by the Mongols, Seljuks, Kara Koyunlu, Iranian Safavids, and then by the Ottoman Turks (though Nader Shah regained it during his short lived Afsharid dynasty).

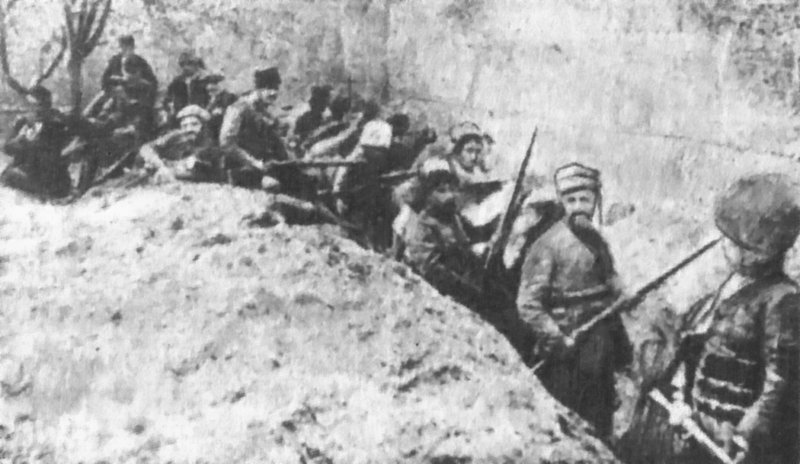
Armenian self-defense units holding a defense line against Turkish forces in the walled city of Van in May 1915

In 1915, most of the Armenians in the region were exterminated or displaced in the Armenian Genocide. The region then became part of Turkey and is mostly settled by Kurds.

== Cantons (Gavars) ==
Vaspurakan's territory was 40,870 km^{2} (16,000 sq mi) and was divided into 35 cantons. They usually took the name of the local nakharar (canton chief) that ruled them:

- Aghiovit
- Aghvandrot
- Akeh
- Andzakhidzor
- Antzevasiq - ruled by the Antzevatsi
- Arberani
- Archishaovit
- Arnoyotn
- Artavanian
- Artashesian
- Artaz
- Atrpatunik
- Bagan
- Bujnunik
- Bogunik
- Darni
- Ervandunik
- Gavityan
- Gazrikan
- Gokhten
- Gukan
- Kirchunik
- Kughanovit
- Mardastan
- Metz Aghbak
- Metznunik
- Nakhichevan
- Rshtunik - ruled by the Rshtuni
- Patspatounik
- Palouniq
- Taygirian
- Tchevashrot
- Tornavan
- Tosb
- Varajnuniq - ruled by the Varajnuni

== Sites of interest ==
- The old city of Van
- Armenian Cathedral of the Holy Cross, former Armenian Catholicosate of Aghtamar on the Isle of Aghtamar
- Varagavank, an Armenian monastery on the slopes of Mt. Varag (9 km. east of Van), founded by King Sennacherib-John early in his reign (1003–1024). It became the richest and most celebrated monastery of the Lake Van area. Here, Khrimian Hayrik founded Arciv Vaspurakani (The Eagle of Vaspurakan), the first newspaper ever printed in Armenia. The archbishop of Van resided here until the late 19th century.
- Chapel of Dzordzor
- The Monastery of Saint Gregory the Illuminator, near Mount Varag
- Naregavank, a destroyed 10th-century Armenian monastery where Krikor Naregatsi is buried
- Karmravank, a 10th-century Armenian monastery on the shores of Lake Van
- Saint Gregory of Goms monastery, on the southern shores of Lake Van
- Saint Thomas Monastery, near the shores of Lake Van
- Saint Bartholomew Monastery
- The Church of the Holy Cross at Soradir
- Hayots Dzor (now Gürpınar plain), the valley in which the Armenian progenitor Hayk defeated the Assyrian king Bel
- Haykaberd, the castle constructed by Hayk in Hayots Dzor
- Plain of Avarayr
- Saint Thaddeus Monastery
- Saint Stepanos Monastery

== Notable people ==
- Khrimian Hayrik
- Aram Manukian

== Gallery ==
Medieval Armenian cathedrals and monasteries in Vaspurakan

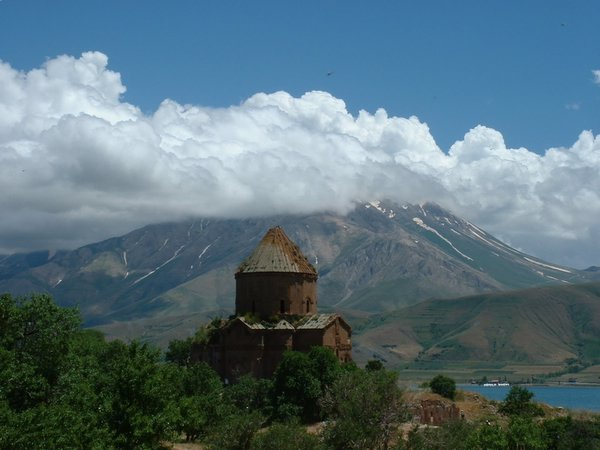
The Cathedral of the Holy Cross (10th century) on Akdamar Island

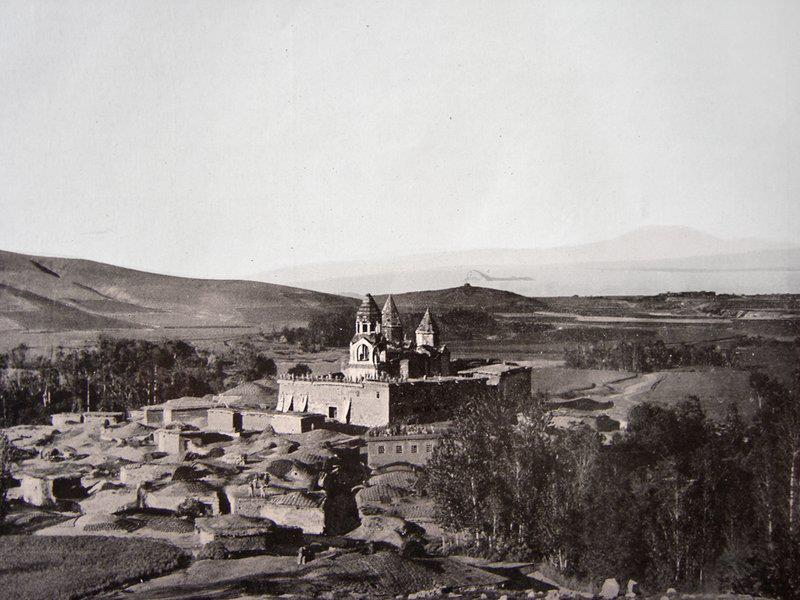
The Monastery of Narek (10th century) on the shores of Lake Van

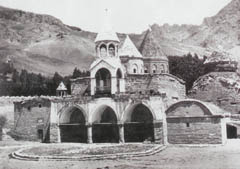
The Monastery of Varag (11th century) at the foot of Mount Varag near Van

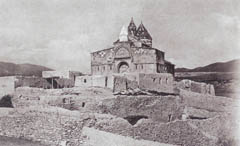
The Monastery of Saint Bartholomew (13th century)

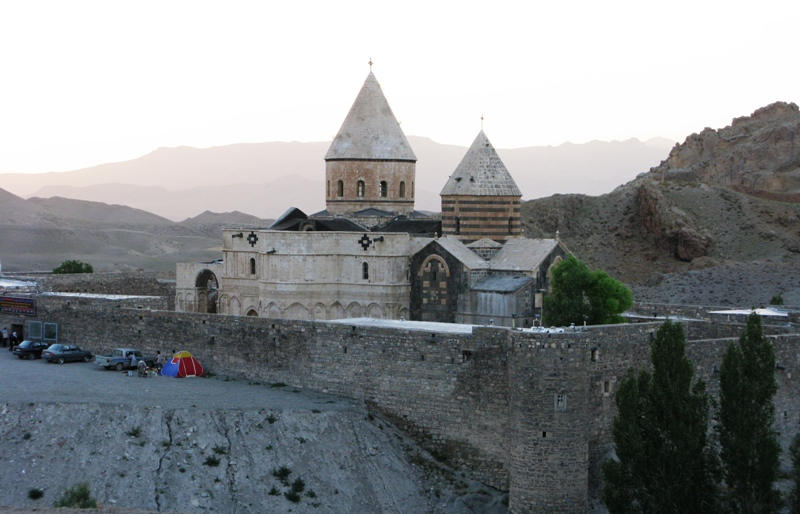
The Saint Thaddeus Monastery (14th century) in northwestern Iran

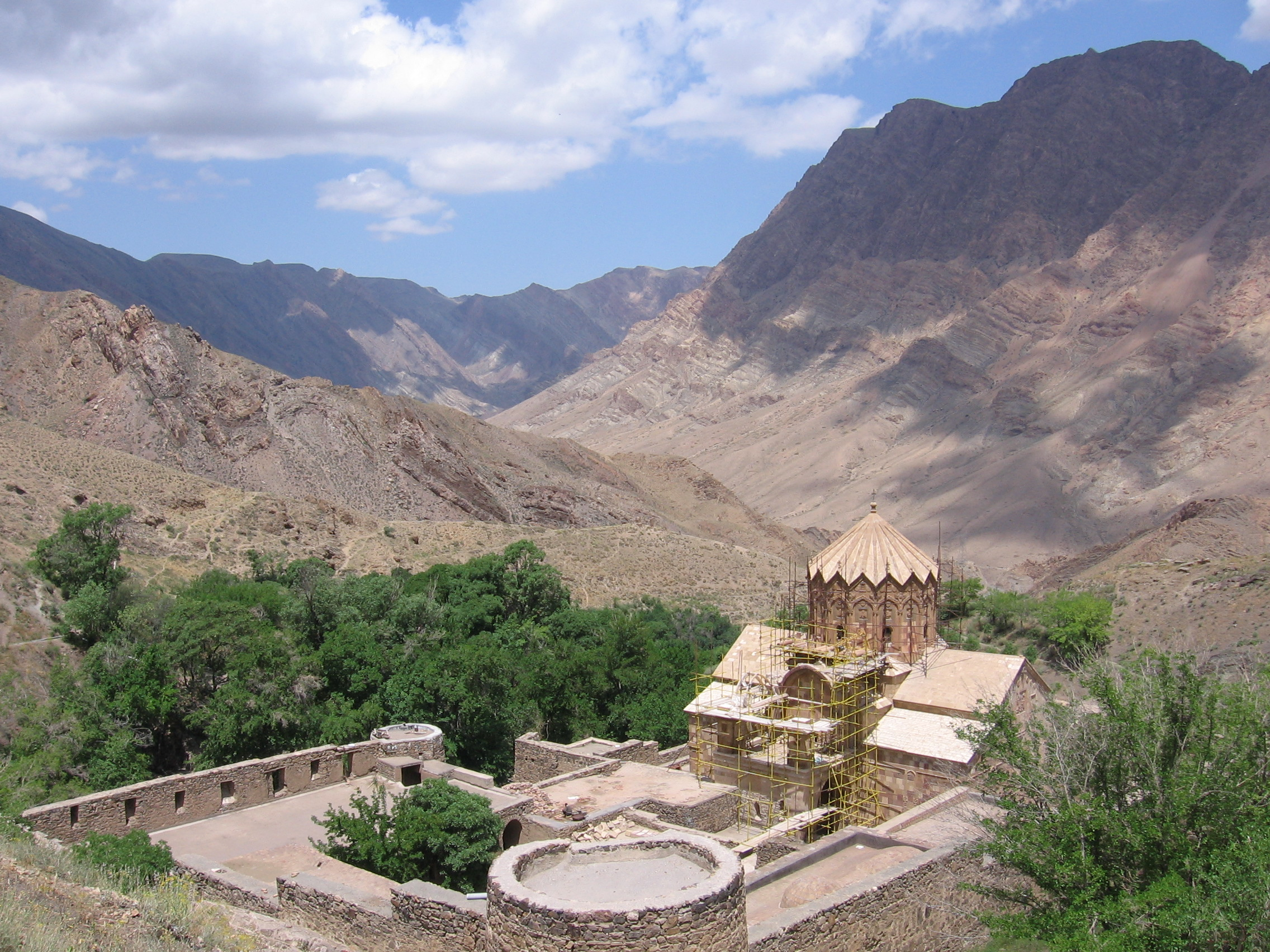
Saint Stepanos Monastery in northwestern Iran

== Bibliography ==
- Achaṛyan, Hrachʻya (1979). "Vaspurakan". Hayeren armatakan bararan [Armenian Etymological Dictionary] (in Armenian). Vol. 4. Erevani hamalsarani hratarakchʻutʻyun. p. 310.
- Der Nersessian, Sirarpie. Armenia and the Byzantine Empire: a Brief Study of Armenian Art and Civilization. Cambridge: Harvard University Press. 1947.
- Hakobyan, Tʻ. Kh.; Melikʻ-Bakhshyan, St. T.; Barseghyan, H. Kh. (1998). "Vaspurakan". Hayastani ev harakitsʻ shrjanneri teghanunneri baṛaran [Dictionary of toponymy of Armenia and adjacent territories] (in Armenian). Vol. 4. Yerevan State University. p. 767.
- Hiwbshman, H. (1907). Hin Hayotsʻ Teghwoy Anunnerě [Ancient Armenian Place Names] (in Armenian). Translated by Pilējikchean, H. B. Vienna: Mkhitʻarean Tparan.
- Hovannisian, Richard G., ed. (2000). Armenian Van/Vaspurakan. Historic Armenian Cities and Provinces. Costa Mesa, California: Mazda Publishers.
- Nyberg, H. S. (1974). "vāspuhr". A Manual of Pahlavi, Part II: Glossary. Wiesbaden: Otto Harrassowitz. p. 205.
