= Monastery of Surp Gevork of Goms =

Historic Armenian monastery in present-day Turkey

Monastery of Saint George of Goms
- Location within Turkey

Religion
- Affiliation: Armenian Apostolic Church
- Status: Ceased functioning as a monastery in 1915

Location
- Location: Bitlis Province, Turkey
- Coordinates: 38.4924°N 42.5437°E

Architecture
- Type: Armenian church
- Style: Armenian
- Completed: 10th century

The Monastery of Saint George of Goms (Armenian: Գոմքի Սուրբ Գևորգ վանք, "Saint George") was an Armenian monastery in the historic province of Vaspurakan, in present-day Turkey. The local Armenian peasants called it Jojglukh vank (Monastery of the Great Head) (Armenian: Ջոջգլուխ վանք). Goms, meaning "cowsheds", was the name of the nearest village to the monastery: this village is now called Kümüs by its Kurdish inhabitants, its official name is Çanakdüzü.

The monastery lied at shores of Lake Van, within a compact and almost square fortified enclosure. The masonry of the enclosure wall is not bonded into the structure of the church, implying that it is a later construction and the church was originally free-standing. There are oval shaped defensive towers at the south-east and north-east corners of the wall. The wall's masonry shows two distinct layers: the bottom three quarters was constructed using roughly shaped but regularly laid stone blocks and the top third uses larger and less regularly shaped stones.

== History ==
This monastery is not mentioned in any known historical source. However historian-orientalist J. M. Thierry considers that both the design of the church and historical events indicate that the church was probably built just after the conquest of this district, called Kardchkan in Armenian, by Gagik Artsruni, the king of Vaspurakan, in 905 AD. The head of the monastery was, by tradition, the bishop of Kardchkan - which suggests that the monastery was once the most important in the district. After the Armenian king John-Senekerim II ceded his Kingdom of Vaspurakan to the Byzantine Empire in 1022, the empire produced a list of the region’s bishopric seats; one such seat was at a monastery of Saint George - this could perhaps have been Goms. The monks possessed a relic that they claimed to be the head of Saint George, and for this reason the monastery was an important pilgrimage site. Due to increasing Kurdish violence, in 1830 the monks had to abandon the monastery and move to a more secure location in the village of Goms. There was an unsuccessful attempt to return to the monastery at the end of the 19th century. The isolated location of the monastery has helped to maintain its preservation and it was functioning until the Armenian genocide in 1915. In 1923 this abandoned monastery was plundered and ruined by Turks and Kurds. But considerable damage has occurred since the early 1970s. In addition, the rising waters of lake Van during the 1990s have eroded the coastline within the bay and now threatens the base of the monastery's fortified wall.
