= Surp Asdvadzadzin Cathedral (Adana) =

Former Armenian church in Adana, Turkey

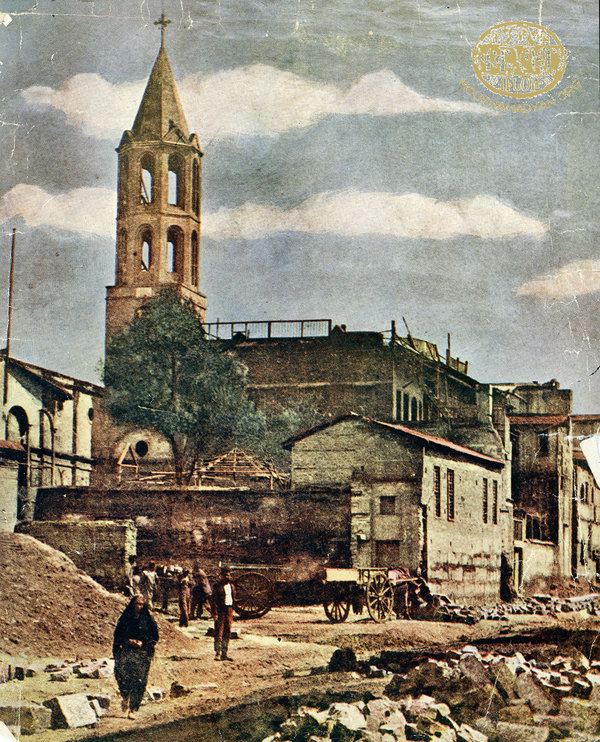
- Holy Mother of God

Religion
- Affiliation: Armenian Apostolic Church, Diocese of Adana, Holy See of Cilicia
- Province: Adana
- Region: Cilicia
- Ecclesiastical or organisational status: demolished
- Leadership: Muşeğ Seropyan
- Year consecrated: 1840

Location
- Location: Tepebağ, Abidinpaşa Street, Adana, Turkey
- Interactive map of Surp Asdvadzadzin Cathedral
- Coordinates: 36°59′10″N 35°19′39″E

Architecture
- Architect: Kireçciyan
- Type: Church
- Style: Armenian
- General contractor: Hagop Khalfa

Surp Asdvadzadzin Cathedral (Armenian: Սուրբ Աստվածածին եկեղեցի, lit. 'Cathedral of the Holy Mother of God'; Turkish: Azize Meryem Ana Kilisesi), was the Armenian Apostolic cathedral of Adana, Cilicia, during the rule of Ottoman Empire. The cathedral was built in 1840 and had served the Armenian Apostolic community until 1922 and the Armenian genocide. Aramian high school and the Armenian Apostolic diocese were also built later in the church property.

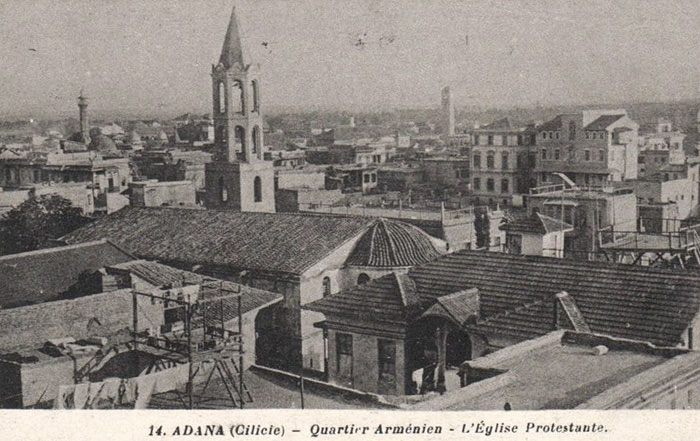
Cathedral view from west

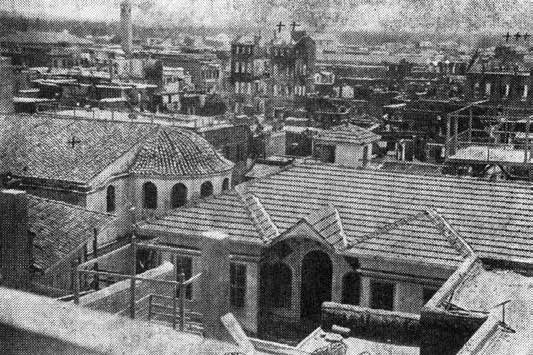
Cathedral was not damaged at the massacre of 1909

Surp Asdvadzadzin Cathedral was re-built in 1840 at the site of the former Surp Asdvadzadzin Church that was built in the 13th century during the Armenian Kingdom of Cilicia. In 1890, under the leadership of Adana archbishop Mkrtich Vehapetyan, the Armenians of Adana celebrated the 50th anniversary of the church. The church was called the "Upper Church" back then because of its position being situated on the hill, and St. Stepanos Church was called the "Lower Church" for being on the plain. Major expansion work completed at the church in the early 1900s by the archbishop Muşeğ Seropyan with the support of the Vali Bahri Paşa. The church, thus, was converted into a cathedral and hosted the seat of the archbishop. Aramian high school was also built at this time. After the deportation of Adana Armenians in the course of Armenian genocide, the church building was used as a military depot. With the French rule commenced in 1918, the cathedral was restored to its origin. However, after 3 years, Armenians had to evacuate Cilicia to escape the state-sponsored pogroms during the French withdrawal.

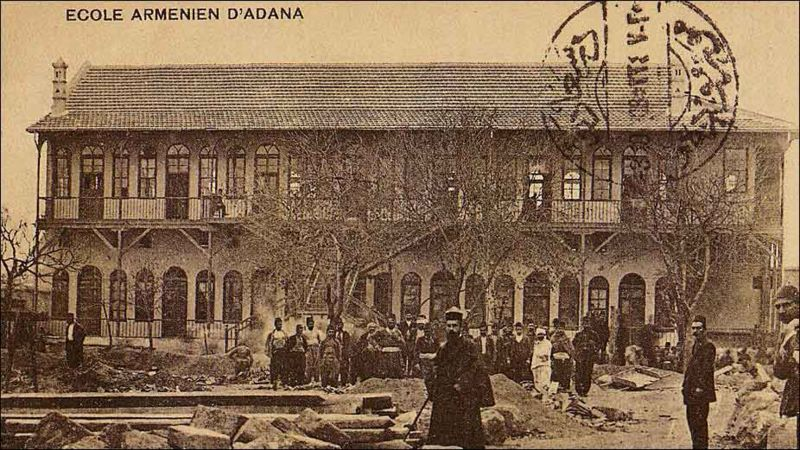
Aramian school at the property

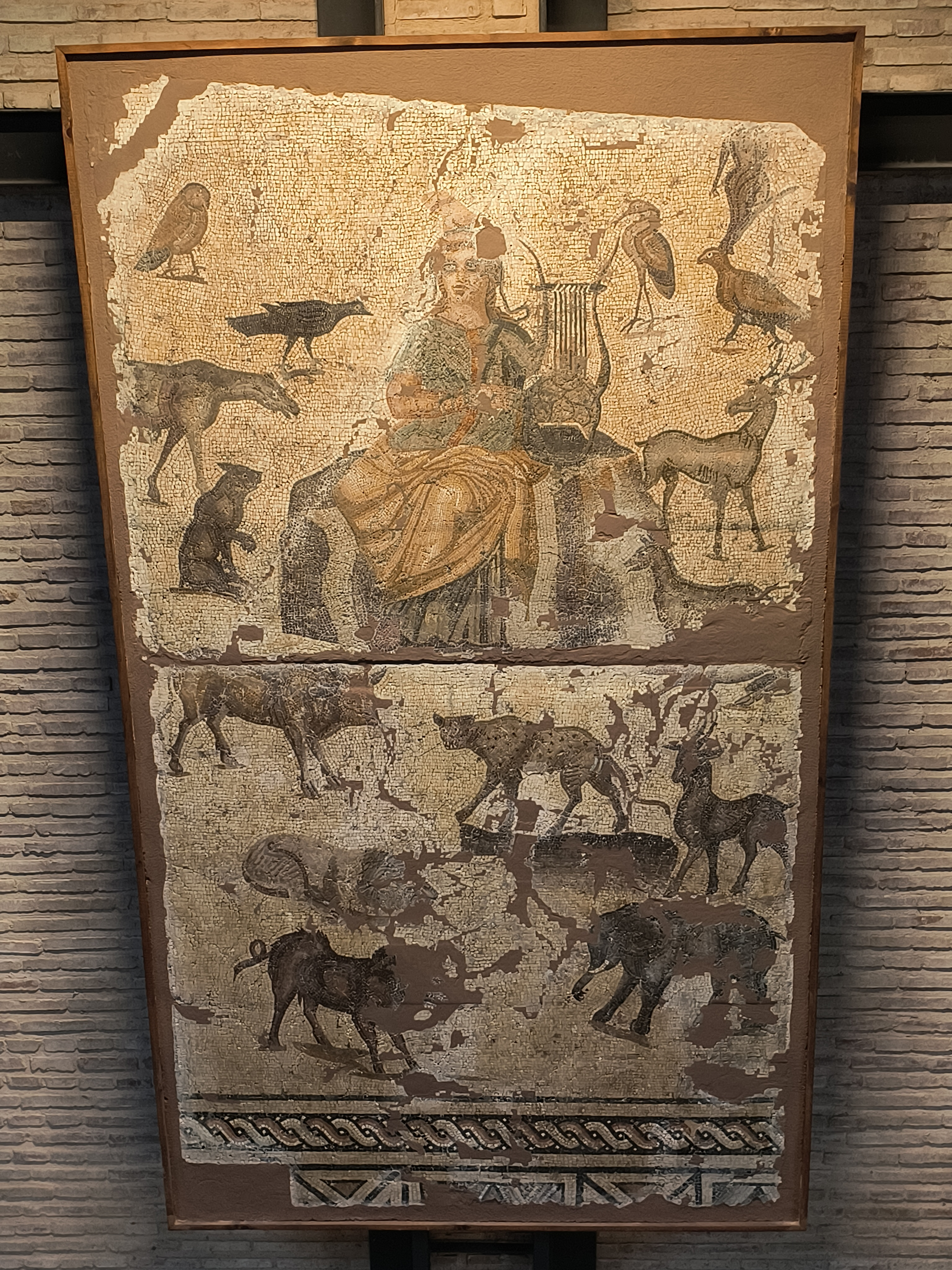
Orpheus Mosaic now at the museum

The government of Turkey had confiscated the building in 1923 and converted it into a state building. In the 1930s, the building was rented out to Baki Tonguç, a local cinema entrepreneur. He had opened the largest indoor Cinema Hall of Adana, Tan Sineması, which served until late 1960s. The cathedral was demolished in the 1970s, to open space for the construction of the regional headquarters of Turkish Central Bank (Turkish: Merkez Bankası). During the first 50 years of the Republic, Armenian cultural heritage had been largely demolished, destroyed or abandoned in an Anti-Armenian sentiment.

== Sources ==
- Nichanian, Mikaël [in French] (2015). Détruire les Arméniens. Histoire d'un génocide [Destroying the Armenians: History of a Genocide] (in French). Presses Universitaires de France. ISBN 978-2-13-062617-6.
