= Güroluk, Başkale =

Güroluk
- Neighbourhood
- Location in Turkey
- Coordinates: 38.084°N 44.036°E
- Country: Turkey
- Province: Van
- District: Başkale
- Population (2022): 270
- Time zone: UTC+3 (TRT)

Güroluk (Armenian: Ալալան, romanized: Alalan) is a neighbourhood of the municipality and district of Başkale, Van Province, Turkey. Its population is 270 (2022). It is 122 km from Van and 5 km from Başkale.

== Population ==
Historical population
Year	Pop.	±% p.a.
1997	423	—
2007	428	+0.12%
2012	395	−1.59%
2017	376	−0.98%
2022	270	−6.41%
Source: 1997 census and TÜIK (2007-2022)
