= Saint Bartholomew Monastery =

Medieval Armenian monestery in present-day Başkale, Van, Turkey

- Սուրբ Բարդուղիմեոս վանք
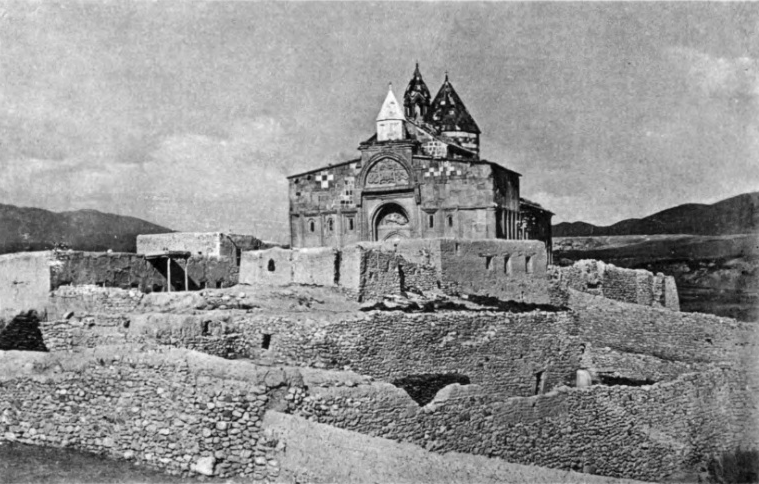
- The monastery of Saint Bartholomew in 1913

- Location within Turkey

Religion
- Affiliation: Armenian Apostolic Church
- Status: Half-ruined

Location
- Location: Albayrak, Van Province, Turkey
- Coordinates: 38.149942°N 44.212925°E

Architecture
- Style: Armenian
- Completed: 13th century (monastery)

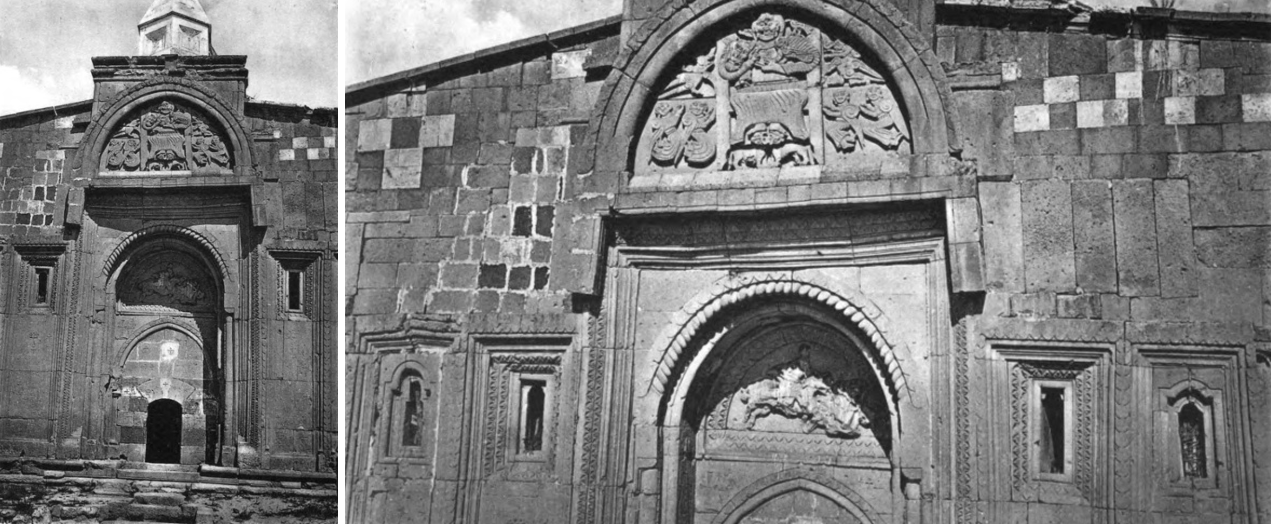
The portal

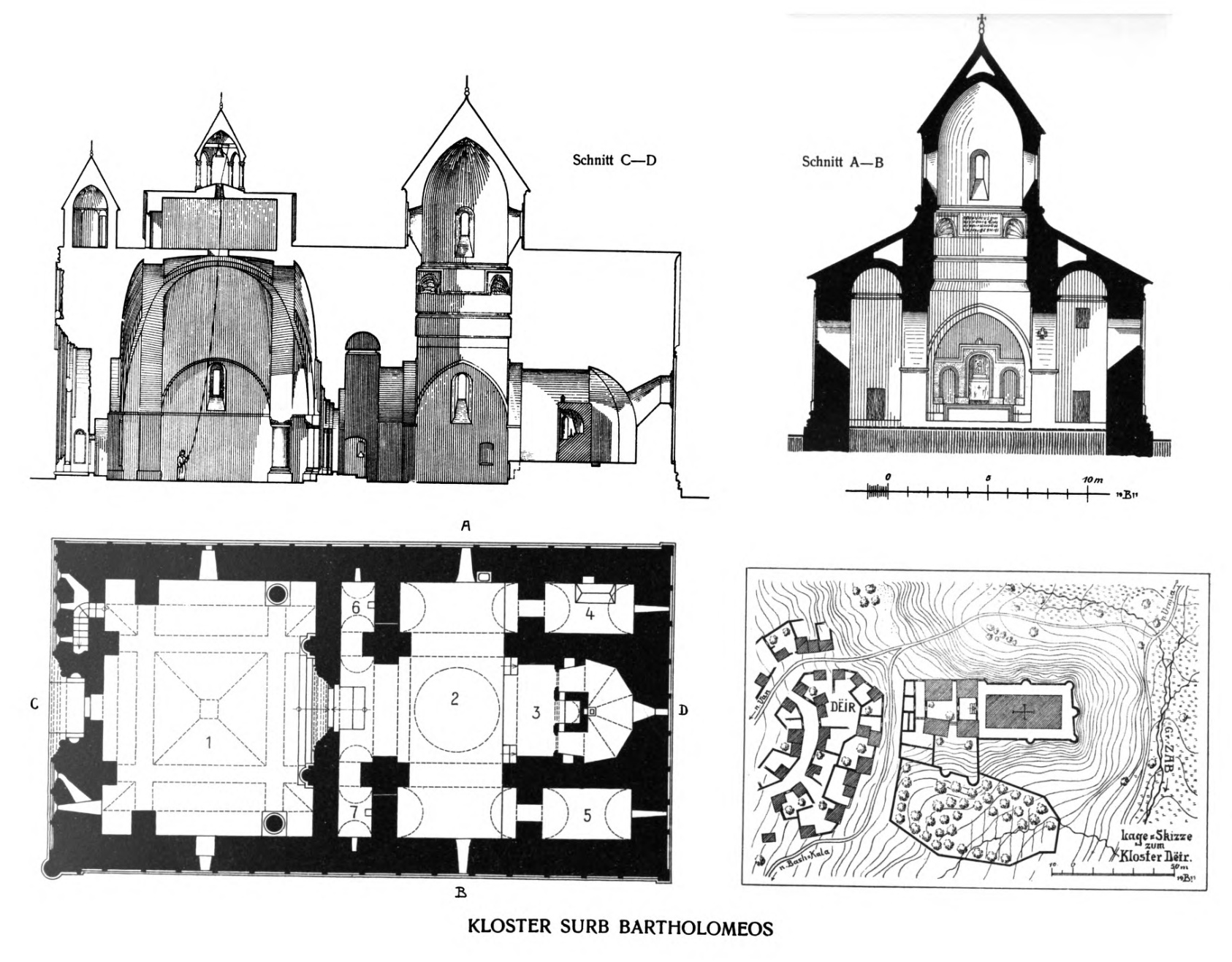
Floor plan and cross section by Bachmann

Saint Bartholomew Monastery (Armenian: Սուրբ Բարդուղիմեոսի վանք, Surb Barduğimeosi vank' ; Western Armenian: Surp Part'uğimeosi vank' ) was a medieval Armenian monastery in the historic province of Vaspurakan, 23 km north-east from the town of Başkale, in present-day Turkey's Van Province, near the Iranian border. The monastery was built on the traditional site of martyrdom of Bartholomew the Apostle, who is reputed to have brought Christianity to Armenia in the first century. Along with Thaddeus the Apostle, Bartholomew is considered the patron saint of the Armenian Apostolic Church. It was a prominent pilgrimage site prior to the Armenian genocide. Today, it is heavily ruined and the dome entirely gone.

== History ==
=== Early history ===
According to tradition the monastery was founded by the Arsacid King Sanatruk in the first century on the tomb of Bartholomew the Apostle, who healed him from leprosy. Other sources say it was founded in the 4th or 6th century. However, the monastery is first mentioned in the 13th century, when it was most likely built. Hampikian wrote that it was the hall that was founded in the 13th century in front of the entrance of a preexisting church. Murad Hasratyan suggested that the main church was built in the 13th century on the foundations of an older basilica.

It rose to prominence in the 14th century. In 1316 father Hakob participated in the Church Council of Adana (link in Armenian). Pope John XXII in 1321 suggested him in a letter to adopt the Roman Rite. A gospel was replicated at the monastery in 1339 and Historical Compilation by Vardan Areveltsi in 1398. A gospel was reproduced at the monastery by the scribe Margar in 1487 and 1490. The monastery was one of the major monasteries of medieval Armenia.

=== Modern period ===
In 1647 the monastery of St. Bartholomew formed a single congregation with the nearby monastery of Varagavank. Father Kirakos repaired the monastery in 1651. A 1715 earthquake destroyed its dome and undermined the walls. The dome was rebuilt by Hovhannes Mokatsi of Lim in 1755–60.

The monastery prospered in the second half of the 19th century. A school was opened at the monastery. The monastery's dome was once again ruined in 1860 and rebuilt in 1878. In the late 19th century the monastery was the seat of the diocese which covered Aghbak, Gavar, Julamerk, Salmast, and Urmia. It included around 100 Armenian villages and large territories of pastures, fields, and forests. It was a prominent pilgrimage site.

== Architecture ==
The traditional tomb of Bartholomew the Apostle was in a sacristy in the northern portion. The tomb bore the text: «Այս է տապան հանգստեան սբ. Բարդուղիմէոսի սրբազան առաքելոյ առաջին լուսաւորչին Հայաստանեաց աշխարհի» (Ays ē tapan hangstean sb. Bardughimēosi srbazan arakeloy arajin lusaworchin Hayastaneats' ashkharhi.) ("This is the ark of rest of the holy apostle St. Bartholomew [who was the] first Enlightener of Armenia".

To the west of the main church was the gavit (narthex), which was stylistically similar and, essentially, a continuation of the church. The gavit had a skylight dome in the center. A tower with a small bell stood further to the west of the gavit. The façades of the church and the gavit were decorated with pilasters. The western façade of the gavit had a large portal with the sculpture of, what was believed to be, Bartholomew the Apostle on a horseback, killing a dragon. At the top of the portal there was a semi-circular sculpture of the Holy Trinity. The portal and the sculptures are considered one of the finest in Armenia.

== Destruction and current state ==
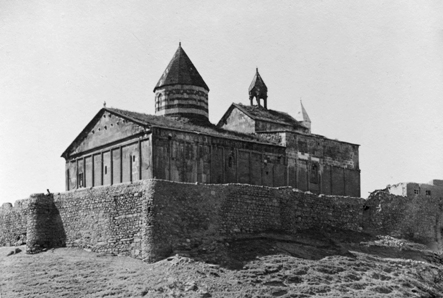
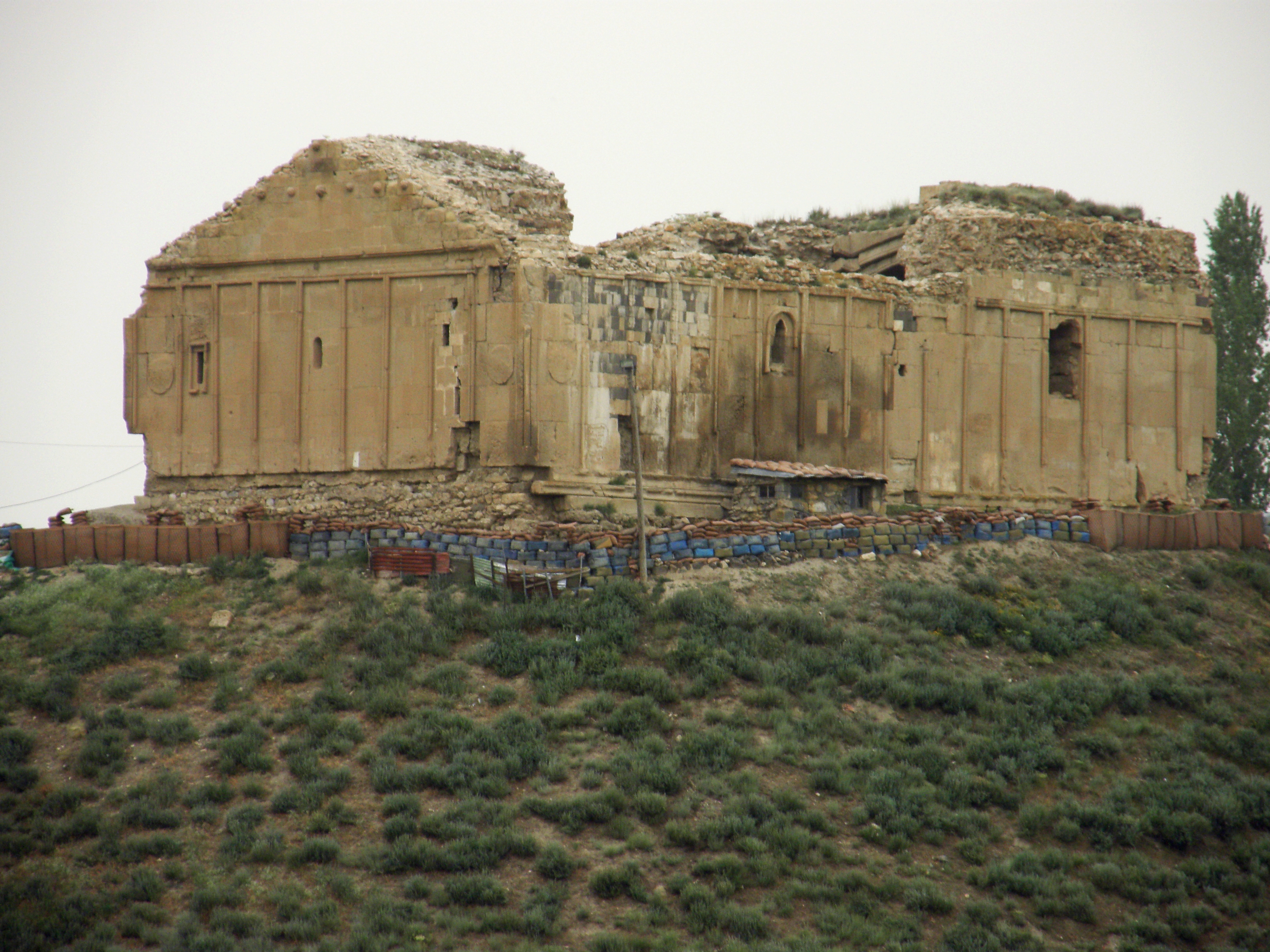
The monastery in the early 20th century and its remains in 2009.

The monastery was abandoned in 1915 during the Armenian genocide although a final liturgy was allowed by Levon Tutundjian [de Vartavan] to be given by a priest, in the presence of his soldiers, on August 14, 1916, a day before the feast of the Assumption of Mary. Tutundjian, who was attached to the French Mission in the Caucasus, and his troops spent part of the summer 1916 in the monastery sleeping in the monks' cells.

The whole structure is now very heavily ruined and the dome is entirely gone. The Armenian Genocide Museum-Institute states that it was blown up by the Turkish military. The destruction by the Turks of the basilica is described by François Balsan in his book Les Surprises du Kurdistan. Murad Hasratyan wrote that it was also ruined in a 1966 earthquake.

In 1990, due to the Kurdish insurgency in south-eastern Turkey, the entire site of the monastery came under control of the Police Special Operations Department (Özel Harekât), which had a base around it. According to the Armenian Genocide Museum-Institute, as of 2009, it was "strictly prohibited to take photos of the monastery and come close to the standing ruins of the Armenian temple because of the regime of high security around the site." It remained inaccessible to visitors until 2013 when the local police station was moved to another location as the PKK and the Turkish government agreed on a ceasefire and a peace process started. The site is now managed by the Turkish Ministry of Culture.

In July 2011, Van Governor Munir Karaloğlu visited the site and gave instructions to launch restoration works. As of 2014, no steps were taken to restore the monastery or prevent it from collapsing. In 2014 Anadolu Agency and Agos mentioned the monastery as a candidate of being restored in the upcoming years. Van Province Culture Director Muzaffer Aktuğ stated in February 2014 that the restoration works would start within that year and noted that it would boost tourism.

== Cultural references ==
In the 1878 novel Jalaleddin, Raffi describes the monastery and its location in detail.

== See also ==
- Saint Thaddeus Monastery, another prominent Armenian monastery dedicated to Saint Thaddeus (in present-day northwestern Iran)

== Bibliography ==
- Bachmann, Walter [in German] (1913). Kirchen und moscheen in Armenien und Kurdistan [Churches and mosques in Armenia and Kurdistan]. 25. Wissenschaftliche veröffenlichung der Deutschen Orient-gesellschaft. Leipzig: J. C. Hinrichs.
