= Metz Aghbak =

Metz Aghbak Armenian: Աղբակ Մեծ is a district of Vaspurakan province of Western Armenia. Its main town was known as Adamamert a.k.a. Hadamakert (meaning: city of Adam). This town corresponds to modern Başkale in the east of modern Turkey.
