= St. Thomas Monastery, Van =

Former Armenian monastery in Turkey

Saint Thomas Monastery
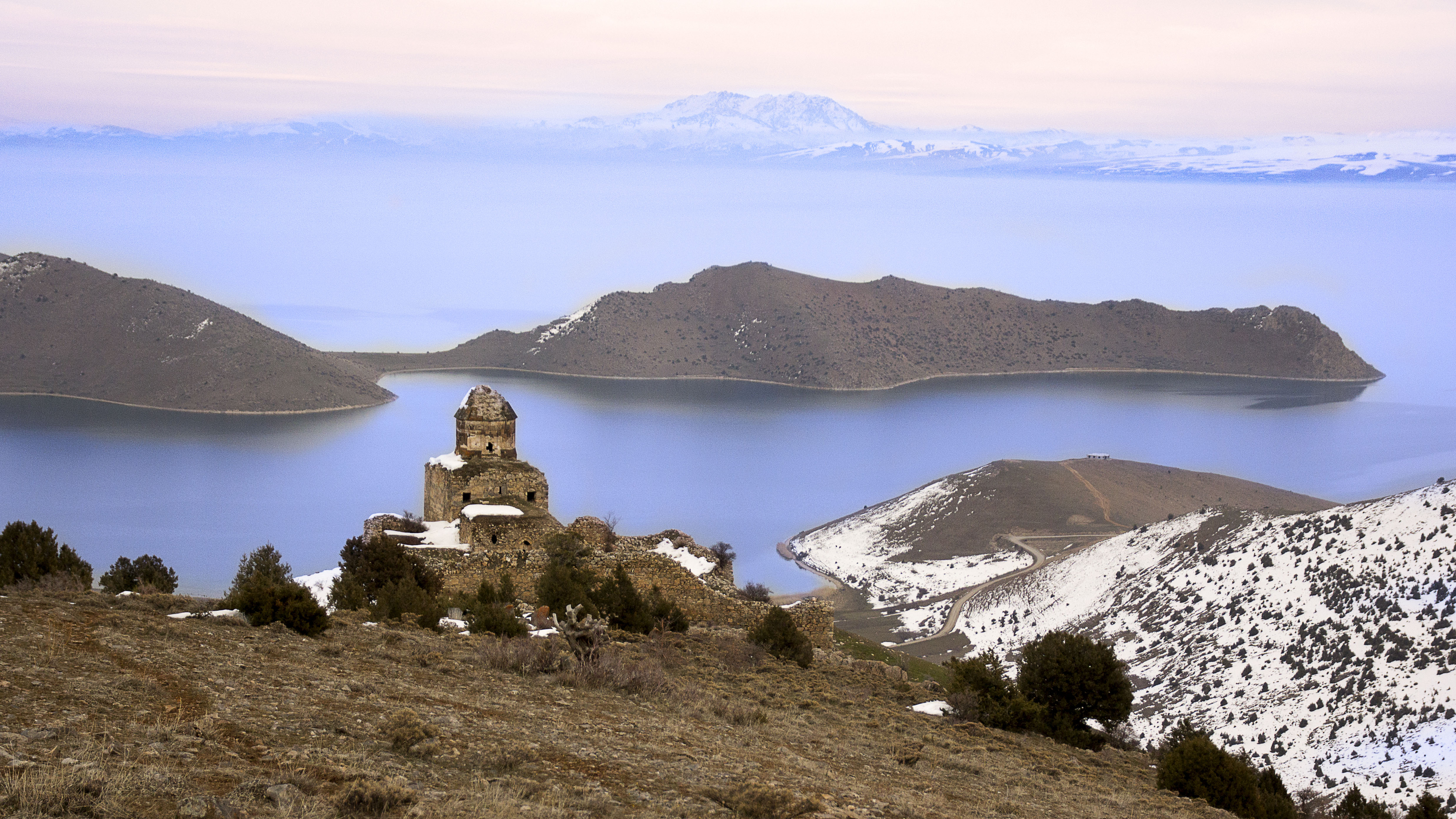

Religion
- Affiliation: Armenian Apostolic Church
- Rite: Armenian
- Status: In ruins

Location
- Location: Lake Van, Turkey
- Interactive map of Saint Thomas Monastery
- Coordinates: 38°25′01″N 42°52′27″E

Architecture
- Type: Monastery
- Completed: 11th to 13th centuries

St. Thomas Monastery is a ruined Armenian monastery overlooking Lake Van in Turkey.

The monastery is situated near the village of Kanzak (Altinsac), on the Southern shore of Lake Van. It was probably constructed in the 11th to 13th centuries, and is mentioned in manuscripts from the 15th century. Parts of the inside were restored in 1581 and the exterior brickwork was repaired in 1801.

It was already deserted before the start of the First World War, with the last monks leaving during the 1895 Hamidian massacres when the building was attacked by Kurds.

The monastery was named after St. Thomas because a reliquary containing the remains of the saint were said to have been brought there from Edessa. St. Thomas supposedly preached in India, where a Christian community still survives in Kerala.

According to historian Ara Sarafian, the monastery has no official protection status and is in danger of collapse. After a visit in 2019, he reported that "parts of the roof of the portico have collapsed, as well as chunks of walls and supporting columns taken away since my last visit. More khachkars were also damaged in the monastery cemetery." The building has been vulnerable to treasure hunters who believe in stories about buried Armenian treasure, and often dig up the ground around Armenian buildings to look for it.
