= Başkale =

- District and municipality
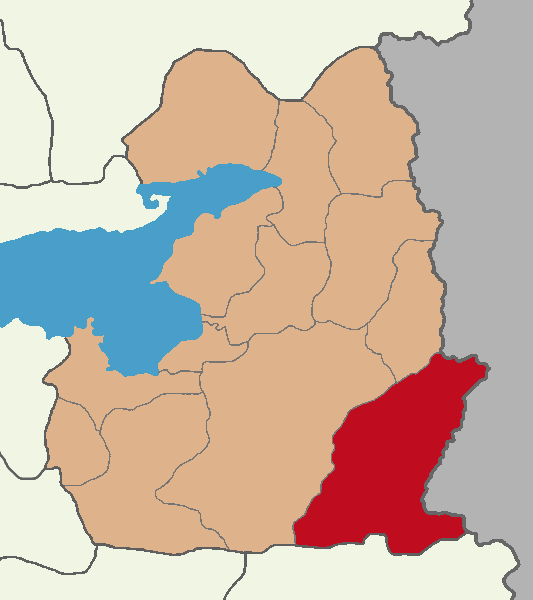
- Map showing Başkale District in Van Province

- Location in Turkey
- Coordinates: 38°02′51″N 44°00′54″E
- Country: Turkey
- Province: Van
- Area: 2,727 km^{2} (1,053 sq mi)
- Population (2022): 44,168
  - Density: 16.20/km^{2} (41.95/sq mi)
- Time zone: UTC+3 (TRT)
- Postal code: 65600
- Area code: 0432
- Website: www.baskale.bel.tr

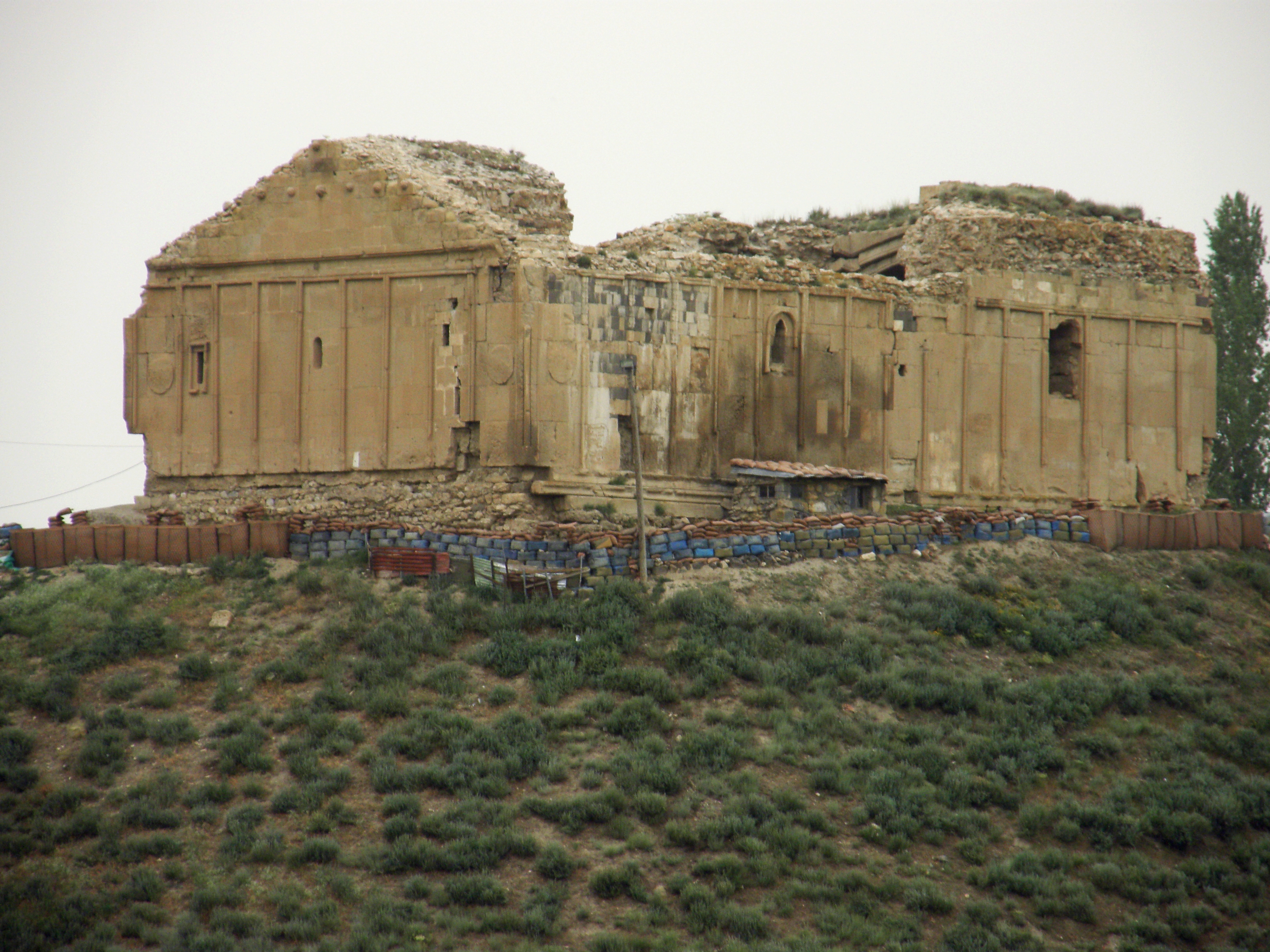
Ruins of the Armenian Saint Bartholomew Monastery in Başkale. It was in use by local Armenians until the Armenian genocide

Başkale (Kurdish: Elbak, Armenian: Ադամակերտ, romanized: Adamakert) is a municipality and district of Van Province, Turkey. Its area is 2,727 km^{2}, and its population is 44,168 (2022). The municipality Başkale was established in 1937. In the local elections of March 2019 Erkan Acar from the Peoples' Democratic Party (HDP) was elected mayor.

== Geography ==
Başkale is situated 20 km (12 mi) west of the Turkey-Iran border. 138 km (86 mi) of the national border is on the east and north-east of the Başkale district. Başkale shares district borders with Yüksekova District of Hakkari Province to the south, Saray and Özalp districts of Van Province to the north, and Gürpınar district of Van Province to the west.

Başkale is situated 2460 metres above sea level, in the valley of the Great Zab River (Zapsuyu), and the town stands on the eastern slope of the south-eastern Taurus Mountains. The majority of the 2,599 km^{2} (1,003 sq mi) Başkale district is mountainous. The agricultural portion is only 355 km^{2} (137 sq mi), approximately 14% of the total area. Başkale is enclosed by Mount (Yiğit)/Haravil (3468 m) in the east, Mount Başkale/İspiriz (3668 m) in the west, and Mount Gökdağ (3604 m) in the south-east. The mountains of Mor, Haravil, Mengene and Çekvan are in the district of Başkale. Other geographical features in Başkale include the Karasu river, and the plateaus of Nebirnav, Kevçikan, Hanasor, Çekvan, Aşkitan (Ülya), Perihan, Meydan, Harinan, Terazın, Sülav, Medgezeren, Pistekan, Herevil-Şirez, Derevan, Derik, Bağarük, Düava and Mengen.

=== Climate ===
Climate data for Başkale, Turkey (1991-2020)
Month	Jan	Feb	Mar	Apr	May	Jun	Jul	Aug	Sep	Oct	Nov	Dec	Year
Mean daily maximum °C (°F)	−1.7 (28.9)	−0.6 (30.9)	3.9 (39.0)	10.0 (50.0)	15.6 (60.1)	21.7 (71.1)	26.1 (79.0)	26.7 (80.1)	22.3 (72.1)	15.0 (59.0)	6.7 (44.1)	0.8 (33.4)	12.3 (54.1)
Daily mean °C (°F)	−6.3 (20.7)	−5.3 (22.5)	−0.8 (30.6)	4.9 (40.8)	10.1 (50.2)	15.4 (59.7)	19.5 (67.1)	19.9 (67.8)	15.3 (59.5)	8.8 (47.8)	1.7 (35.1)	−3.8 (25.2)	6.7 (44.1)
Mean daily minimum °C (°F)	−9.7 (14.5)	−9.0 (15.8)	−4.6 (23.7)	0.6 (33.1)	5.1 (41.2)	9.4 (48.9)	13.1 (55.6)	13.3 (55.9)	9.0 (48.2)	3.8 (38.8)	−2.2 (28.0)	−7.1 (19.2)	1.9 (35.4)
Average precipitation mm (inches)	33.1 (1.30)	42.4 (1.67)	59.4 (2.34)	70.0 (2.76)	52.5 (2.07)	25.1 (0.99)	17.4 (0.69)	9.8 (0.39)	7.7 (0.30)	28.4 (1.12)	43.6 (1.72)	37.2 (1.46)	426.3 (16.78)
Average precipitation days (≥ 1 mm)	5.4	6.0	7.6	8.6	8.4	4.7	4.0	2.5	2.0	4.8	5.6	5.8	65.4
Average relative humidity (%)	69.2	68.0	63.1	56.0	51.9	43.9	39.7	37.2	39.8	52.8	60.3	67.7	54.1
Source: NOAA

== Demographics ==
According to Encyclopædia Britannica Eleventh Edition from 1911, the town included 10 thousand people, mostly consisting of Kurds but also 1.5 thousand Armenians and 1 thousand Jews.

== Composition ==
There are 69 neighbourhoods in Başkale District:

- Açıkağıl
- Akçalı
- Albayrak
- Aşağıküme
- Aşalan
- Atlılar
- Aydemir
- Azıklı
- Barış
- Belencik
- Beşocak
- Bilgeç
- Böğrüpek
- Bölekli
- Büklümdere
- Çakırdoğan
- Çaldıran
- Dereiçi
- Deringeçit
- Ekecek
- Erek
- Erkonağı
- Esenyamaç
- Eşmepınar
- Evbakan
- Gedikbaşı
- Gelenler
- Güleçler
- Güroluk
- Güvendik
- Hafiziye
- Hasanbey
- Ilıcak
- Işıklı
- Kaşkol
- Kavurgalı
- Keçilioba
- Kızılca
- Kocaköy
- Koçdağı
- Konuksayar
- Köprüağzı
- Kovalıpınar
- Mahmutabat
- Oğulveren
- Ömerdağı
- Öncüler
- Örencik
- Örenkale
- Örmetaş
- Ortayazı
- Ortayol
- Özpınar
- Saçan
- Sallıdere
- Savaş
- Sualtı
- Tahıl
- Tepebaşı
- Tınazlı
- Uğurlu
- Yanal
- Yavuzlar
- Yeni
- Yolmaçayır
- Yukarıdallı
- Yukarıdarıca
- Yukarıdikmen
- Yurttepe
