= Mother See of Holy Etchmiadzin =

Governing body of the Armenian Apostolic Church

Coordinates: 40.1620°N 44.2912°E

Mother See of Holy Etchmiadzin (See of Etchmiadzin)
- The coat of arms of the Catholicosate of All Armenians
- Primate: Catholicos of All Armenians Karekin II
- Language: Armenian
- Headquarters: Vagharshapat, Armavir Province, Armenia
- Territory: Armenia
- Possessions: Armenia, Europe, Asia, Australia, Africa, Middle East, North America, and South America
- Founder: The Apostles Bartholomew and Thaddeus
- Independence: Apostolic Era
- Recognition: Armenian Apostolic Church
- Members: 6,000,000
- Official website: www.armenianchurch.org

Mother See of Holy Etchmiadzin (Armenian: Մայր Աթոռ Սուրբ Էջմիածին, romanized: Mayr At’oř Surb Ēĵmiatsin), known in Armenian as simply the Mother See (Մայր Աթոռ, Mayr At’oř), is the governing body of the Armenian Apostolic Church. It is headquartered around Etchmiadzin Cathedral in Vagharshapat (Etchmiadzin), Armenia and is the seat of the Catholicos of All Armenians, the head of the church.

== Organizational structure ==
The organizational structure of the Mother See of Holy Etchmiadzin is composed of spiritual and administrative bodies representing the authority of the Armenian Church, as follows:

=== Supreme Spiritual Council ===
The Supreme Spiritual Council (Armenian: Գերագոյն Հոգեւոր Խորհուրդ Geraguyn Hokevor Khorhurt) is headed by the Catholicos of All Armenians. It is the highest executive body of the Armenian Apostolic Church. Members of the Spiritual Council are either elected by the National Ecclesiastical Assembly or directly appointed by the Catholicos of All Armenians. The Supreme Spiritual Council was established on January 1, 1924, upon reforms initiated by Catholicos George V, replacing the Synod of Bishops.

=== National Ecclesiastical Assembly ===
The National Ecclesiastical Assembly (Armenian: Ազգային եկեղեցական ժողով Azgayin Yekeghetsakan Zhoghov) is headed by the Catholicos of All Armenians. It is the supreme legislative body of the Armenian Church. Elected by the individual Diocesan Assemblies, the National Ecclesiastical Assembly is the body that elects the Catholicos of All Armenians.

=== Council of Bishops ===
The Council of Bishops (Armenian: Եպիսկոպոսաց ժողով Yepiskoposats Zhoghov) is an administrative body headed by the Catholicos of All Armenians. It has a consulting role, making suggestions on the dogmatic, religious, and canonical issues to be during the meetings of the National Ecclesiastical Assembly.

=== Diocesan Assembly ===
The Diocesan Assembly (Armenian: Թեմական Պատգամաւորական Ժողով Temakan Patkamavorakan Zhoghov) headed by the primate of the diocese, is the highest legislative body of each dioceses of the Armenian church. The assembly elect the delegates to the National Ecclesiastical Assembly, as well as the members of the Diocesan Council. The assembly is heavily involved in the administrative issues within the diocese. In some cases, the assembly elects the primate of the diocese.

=== Diocesan Council ===
The Diocesan Council (Armenian: Թեմական Խորհուրդ Temakan Khorhurt) headed by the primate of the diocese, is the highest executive body of a dioceses of the Armenian church. It regulates the internal administrative activity of the diocese under the direction of the primate. Members of the council are elected by the Diocesan Assembly.

=== Monastic Brotherhood ===
The Monastic Brotherhood (Armenian: Վանական Միաբանութիւն Vanakan Miabanutiun) is composed of the celibate clergy of the monastery who are led by the abbot. Currently, the Armenian Church has 3 brotherhoods: the brotherhood of the Mother See of Holy Etchmiadzin, the brotherhood of Saint James at the Armenian Patriarchate of Jerusalem, and the brotherhood of the Holy See of Cilicia. The brotherhood is involved in decisions regarding the internal affairs of the monastery. Each brotherhood elects 2 delegates to take part in the National Ecclesiastical Assembly.

=== Parish Assembly ===
The Parish Assembly (Armenian: Ծխական Ժողով Tskhakan Zhoghov) is the general assembly of the community regulated by the spiritual pastor. The Parish Assembly either elects or appoints the members of the Parish Council as well as the delegates to the Diocesan Assembly.

=== Parish Council ===
The Parish Council (Armenian: Ծխական Խորհուրդ Tskhakan Khorhurt) is the executive-administrative body of the community, regulated by the spiritual pastor of the community. It is mainly involved in the realization of the administrative and financial activities of the community. Members of the council are either elected or appointed by the Parish Assembly.

== Departments ==
The Mother See of Holy Etchmiadzin has the following service departments:

- Ecumenical Relations Department: the Mother See of Holy Etchmiadzin became member of the World Council of Churches in 1962. In 1973, the Ecumenical Relations Department was officially established by Catholicos Vazgen I. Adjacent to the department, the Ecumenical Theological Council of Consultation was founded in 2011.
- Information Services Department: founded in December 1994 as the press office of the Mother See. In 2000, it became known as Information Services Department, upon reforms initiated by Catholicos Karekin II.
- Christian Education Center: the centre was opened on November 22, 1996, by Catholicos Karekin I. The centre operates with many sections, with activities directed to Christian education and teaching methods, as well as relations with other churches and international institutions.
- Publications Department: of the Mother See was opened on April 1, 2006. In addition to the formal published books and works, the department also issues religious, calendars, prayer booklets, educational pamphlets, etc. Etchmiadzin monthly is the official periodical of the Catholicosate of all Armenians. It was first published in 1944 and is considered the successor of the Ararat monthly published earlier by the Catholicos George IV in 1868. The publications in general are realized through the donations of a group of faithful sponsors.

== Programs ==
- Youth centers known as Hayordyats toun (Armenian: Հայորդյաց տուն) in Armenian: are children's creativity centers located throughout Armenia under the regulation of the Mother See supported by the Armenian General Benevolent Union. The program was initiated by Catholicos Karekin II in 1993 who was serving as Pontifical Vicar of the Araratian Pontifical Diocese at the time. Currently, there are 8 centres: 4 in the capital Yerevan (including the Hayk and Elza Titizian Children's Rehabilitation Center), with the remaining 3 centers located in Vanadzor, Vagharshapat and Ashtarak. Approximately 3,500 students regularly attend the centers.
- College Ministry: the program was launched on December 26, 2004, by Catholicos Karekin II, aimin to work cooperatively with student council organizations of the major Armenian universities. The ministry is headquartered in Yerevan.
- Izmirlian Medical Center and Surb Nerses Mets Research and Education Center: a medical center-institute originally opened in 1986 in Yerevan as a center of proctology. Between 1998 and 2000, the center was redeveloped by the Armenian General Benevolent Union. In 2000, the center was granted to the Mother See of Holy Etchmiadzin. In 2013, the center was entirely redeveloped through donations from the Izmirlian Family Foundation.
- Soup kitchens: the program was launched in 1992, shortly after independence, in partnership with the Armenian General Benevolent Union. Currently, there are 3 soup kitchens in Yerevan, with the other 3 located in Sevan, Vagharshapat and Hrazdan. The kitchens serve more than 1,200 recipients per day, from the most vulnerable members of the society.
- Prison Ministry: the program was launched in May 1993 by Catholicos Karekin II who was serving as Pontifical Vicar of the Araratian Pontifical Diocese at that time. The purpose of the program is to make the spiritual service in detention facilities more organized and productive. Currently, all of the 12 detention centres in Armenia are provided with spiritual service.
- Church Chaplaincy of the Armed Forces of Armenia: the program was officially launched on November 13, 1997, upon the joint initiative of Ctaholicos Karekin I, and then-Minister of Defence Vazgen Sargsyan. The program is initiated primarily to serve in the frontier regiments of the Armenian Army, the military educational institutions, as well as in the regiments of the Nagorno-Karabakh Defense Army. Permanent chapels have been opened in many regiments.

== Directly regulated churches ==
While most of the Armenian churches are regulated by the local diocese of the church, however, there are few churches in different locations of Armenia are directly regulated by the Mother See of Holy Etchmiadzin:

- Churches of the Mother See complex, including: Etchmiadzin Cathedral (opened in 301), Saints Vartan and Hovhannes Baptistery (opened in 2008), and the Church of the Holy Archangels (opened in 2011).
- Churches of Etchmiadzin UNESCO World Heritage Site, including: Saint Hripsime Church (opened in 618), Saint Gayane Church (opened in 630), and Shoghakat Church (opened in 1694).
- Sevanavank monastic complex in Gegharkunik Province of the 9th century.
- Khor Virap Monastery in Ararat Province of the 17th century.
- Saint Gregory the Illuminator Cathedral in Yerevan, opened in 2001.
- Surp Hakob Chapel of Vaskenian Theological Academy in Gegharkunik Province, opened in 2005.
- Surp Anna Church in Yerevan, opened in 2015, with the Yerevan residence of the Catholicos.

== Educational institutions ==
- Gevorkian Seminary.
- Vaskenian Theological Academy.
- Armenian College and Philanthropic Academy of Kolkata, India: operating since 1821, under the direct regulation of the Mother See.
- Turpanjian Theological High School of Harichavank, operating since 1881.
- Karekin I Centre of Theology and Armenology.
- Eurnekian School: operating since 2009 and regulated by the Mother See. It was founded on the basis of No. 13 School of Vagharshapat operating since 1959. The current building of the school is located to the south of the Mother Cathedral, within the territory of the Mother See complex.

== Other projects and activities ==
The Mother See has responsibility over many educational and social services programs, including:

- Vagharshapat City Stadium: is a football stadium opened in 1973 at the south of the Mother See complex and has a capacity of 3,000 spectators. The stadium will be fully renovated within the near future through the financial support of the church benefactors.
- Shoghakat TV of the Mother See: based in Shengavit District of Yerevan, has been broadcast since November 2002.
- "Let It Be Light" solar photovoltaic park: located to the south of the Mother See, outside the walls of the complex. The project was initiated and fulfilled in 2017, including installation of solar water heaters and photovoltaic array, with a cost exceeding US$2 million. It also includes a solar park, solar heating system and solar efficiency programs. The project was financed by the Tunyan Family Fund.

== Buildings and structures in the monastic complex ==
=== Churches ===
- Mother Cathedral of Holy Etchmiadzin was built by Saint Gregory the Illuminator in 301–303. The Etchmiadzin Cathedral is the oldest church built by a state in the world. According to the 5th-century Armenian annals, Saint Gregory had a vision of Christ descending from heaven and striking the earth with a golden hammer to show where the cathedral should be built. Hence, the patriarch gave the church and the city the new name of Echmiadzin, which can be translated as "the place where the Only Begotten descended". In 480, Vahan Mamikonian, the Sassanian governor-marzban of Armenia, ordered the dilapidated basilica to be replaced with a new cruciform church. In 618, a stone dome replaced the original wooden one, resting on four massive pillars linked to exterior walls by arcades. This was the church much as it is today. Murals in the interior and extravagant rotundas surmounting the apses appeared in the early 18th century. Between 1654 and 1658, the main three-tier belfry at the entrance of the cathedral was erected.
- Saints Vartan and Hovhannes Baptistery, a chapel located at the north of the Mother Cathedral, designated for baptism ceremonies. The three-domed chapel was designed by architects Jim Torosyan and Romeo Julhakyan. The chapel was consecrated on 26 September 2008 and the construction was funded by the British-Armenian philanthropist Armen Sarkissian.
- Church of the Holy Archangels, built between 2009 and 2011, located in the yard of Gevorkian Seminary building. The single-domed church was consecrated on 5 November 2011. It was designed by architect Jim Torosyan, funded by philanthropist Gagik Galstyan.
- Pontifical Chapel of the Holy Patriarchs, opened on 18 September 2019 in the yard of Veharan pontifical residence. Carvings of the four evangelists adorn the chapel's dome, while the twelve apostles are depicted on its pillars.
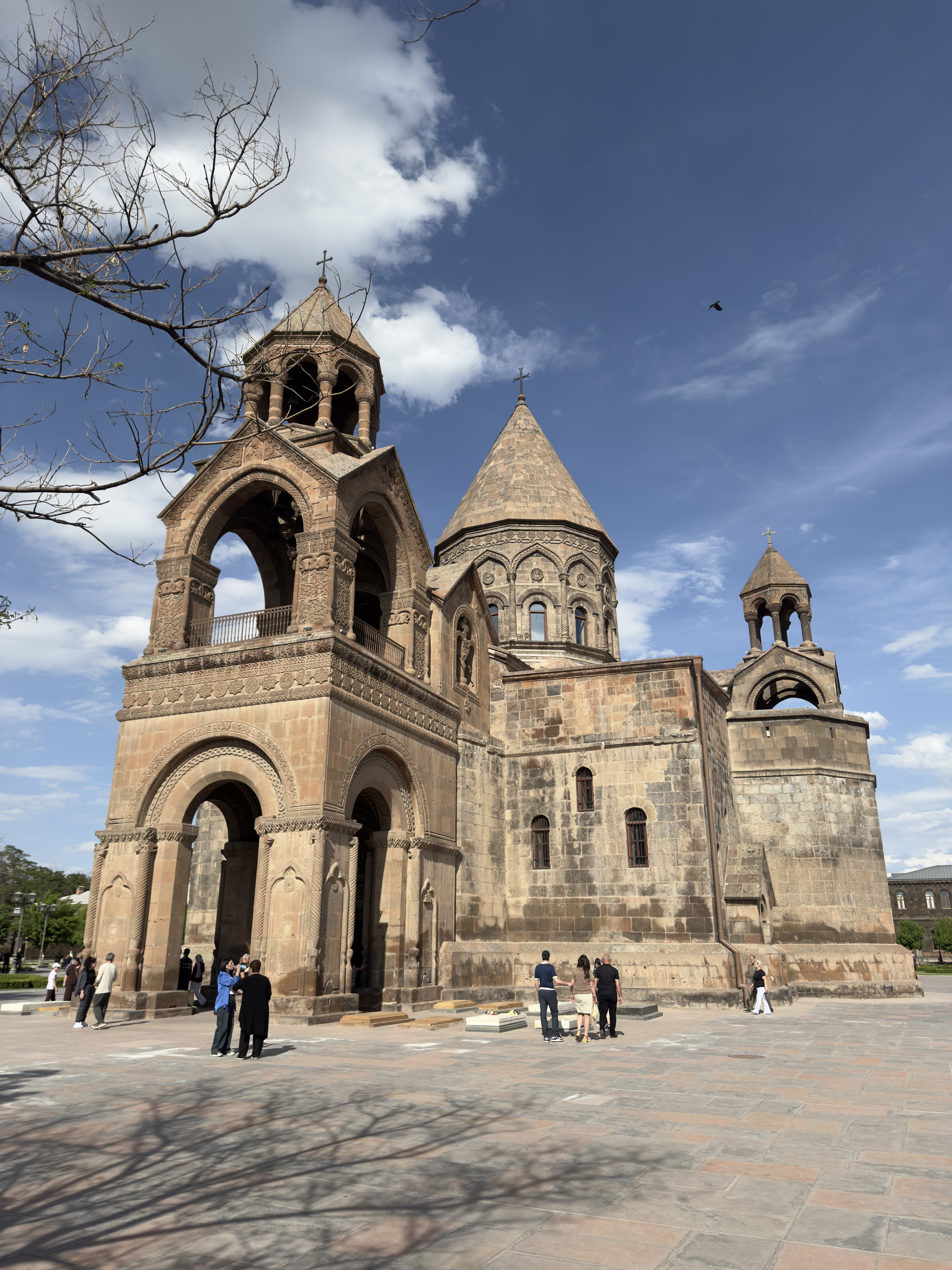
Mother Cathedral of Holy Etchmiadzin

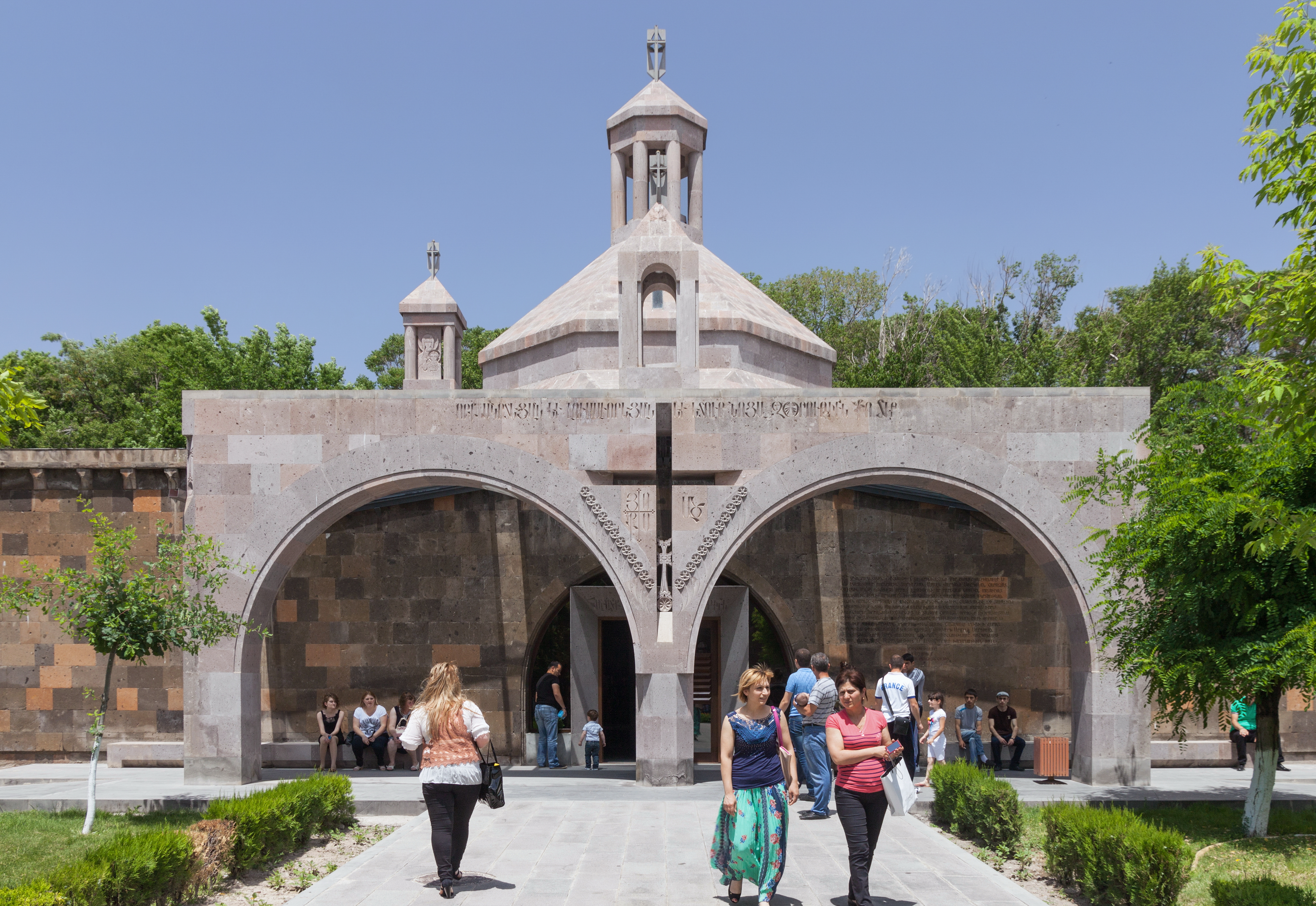
Saints Vartan and Hovhannes Baptistery

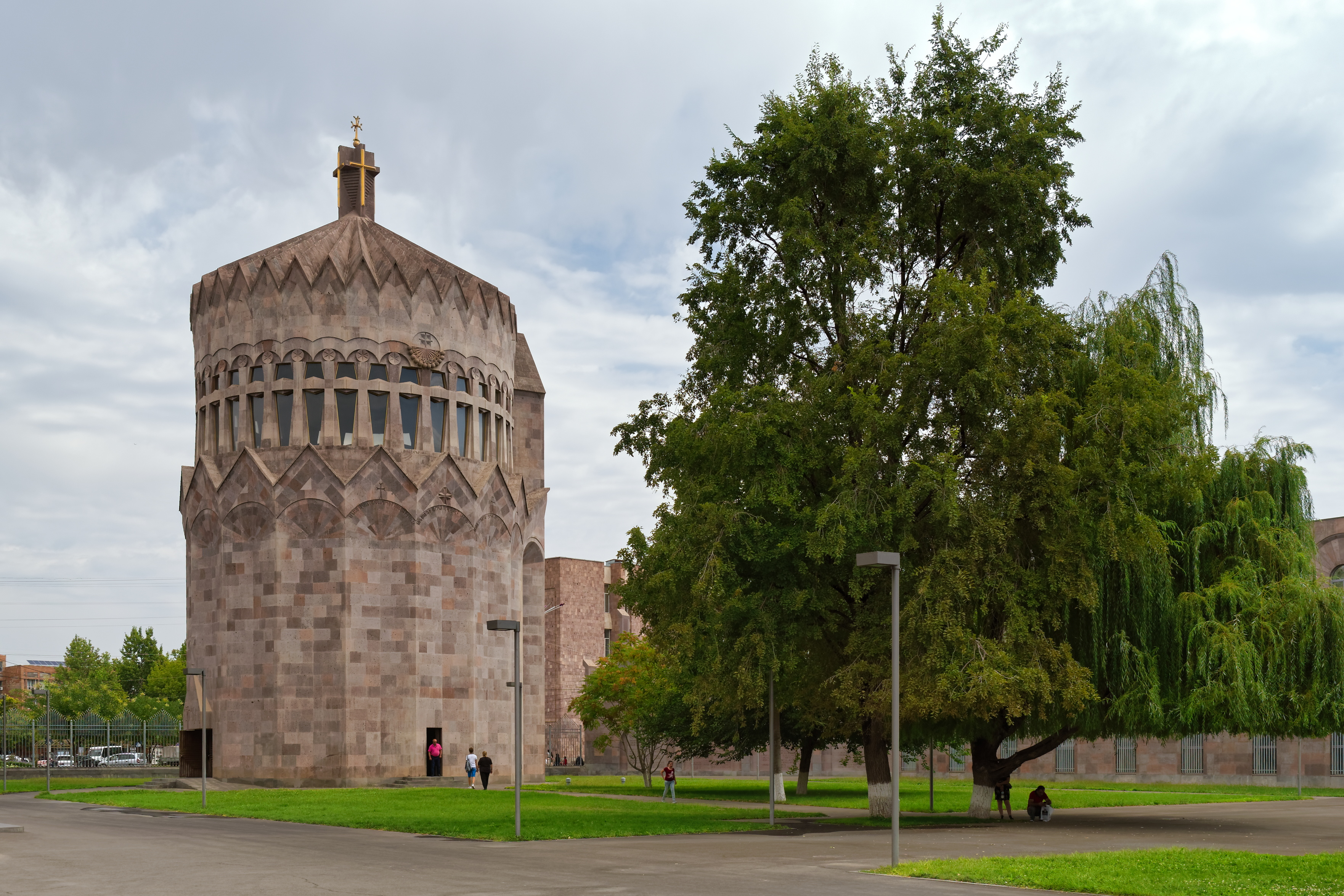
Church of the Holy Archangels

=== Administrative buildings ===
- Gevorg VI Chorekchyan Ecumenical Center at the Old Synod building, home to Ecumenical Relations Department. The one-story building was built by Catholicos Mkrtich I in 1896–97 to serve as a chancellery and synod building, until it was nationalized after the Soviet occupation in 1920. It was returned to the Mother See during the 1950s. Since its renovation in 2011, the structure was renamed after Catholicos George VI of Armenia to become an administrative building, housing the Ecumenical Relations Department of the Mother See, along with the offices of the Round Table Foundation and Ecumenical Church Loan Fund (ECLOF) of the World Council of Churches.
- Veharan pontifical residence: is the headquarters and main residence of the Catholicos of All Armenians. Designed by architect P. Zohrabov, the construction of the building started on June 6, 1910 and completed in 1915, through the donations of Alexander Mantashev. After 1920, the building was used by the Soviets as a military base until 1956, when it was returned to the Mother See through the efforts of Catholicos Vazgen I. In 1957, the residence was entirely rebuilt through the donations of Gegham Tandzikian, based on a new design composed by architects Artsruni Galikyan, Rafael Israelyan and Baghdasar Arzoumanian. Currently, the two-storied building houses the administrative offices of the Catholicos, the pontifical residence quarters, several meeting rooms and a treasury-museum.
- Divanatoon or the chancellery: built in 2005–08, located next to the Veharan pontifical residence. The two-storied building is designed by architect Armand Avagyan, and funded by Nazar and Artemis Nazarian from the United States. It serves as the working office of the Catholicos and the Supreme Spiritual Council.
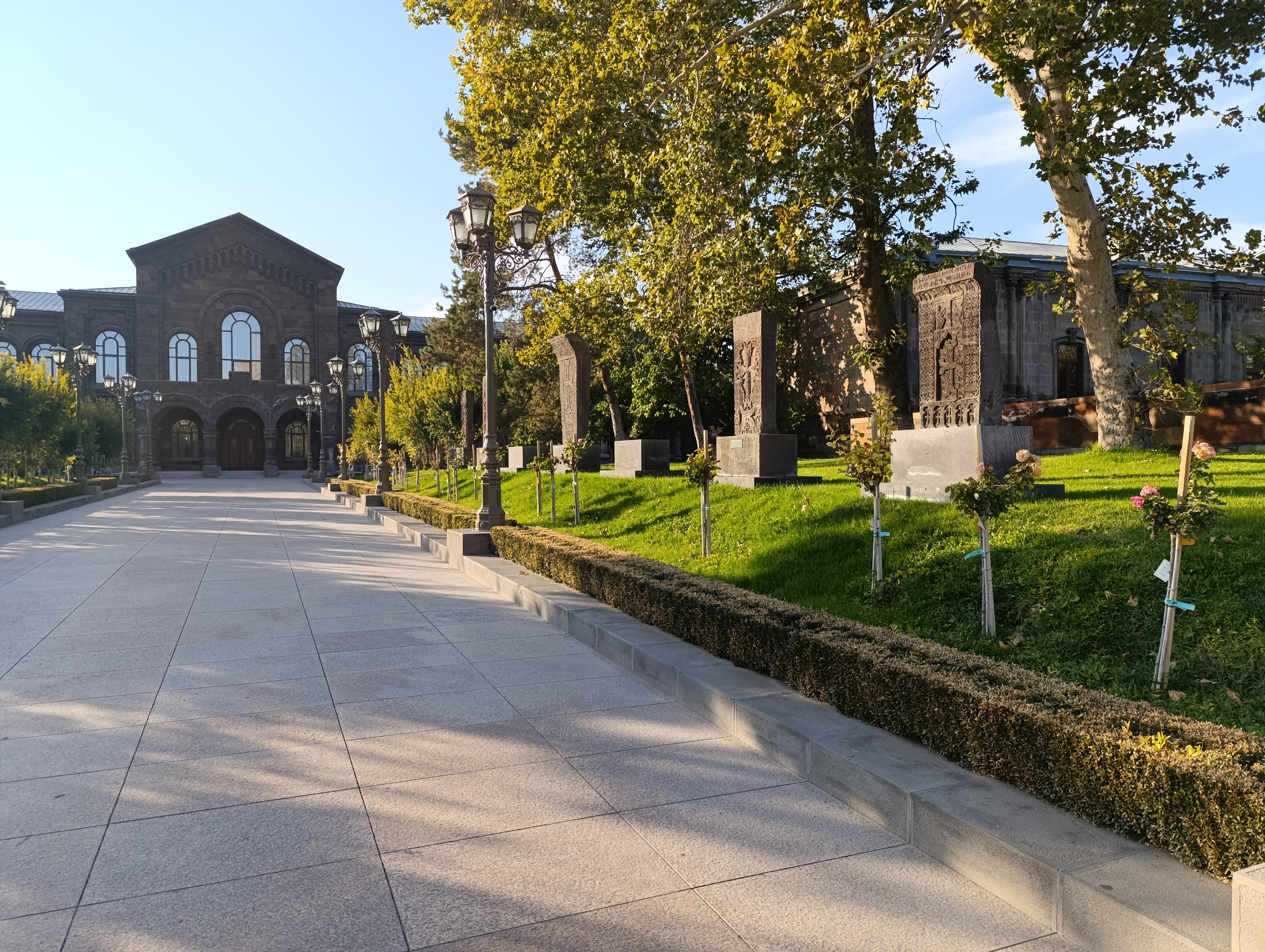
Gevorg VI Chorekchyan Ecumenical Center (right)

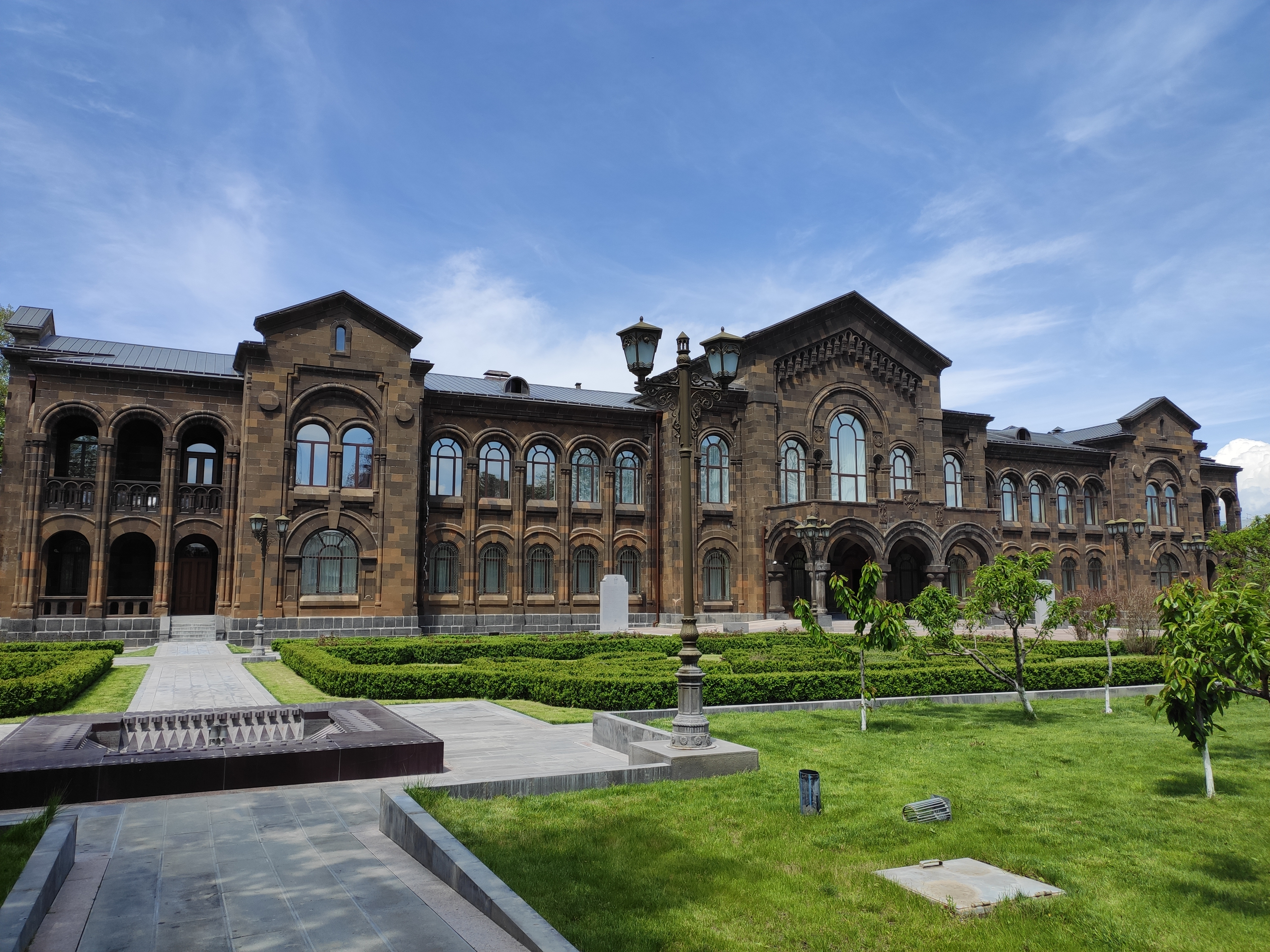
Veharan pontifical residence

=== Monastic residences ===
- Ghazarapat deacons' residence: built in mid 18th century and located to the south of the Cathedral. The 1st floor of the two-storied building is currently housing showrooms and museums, while the 2nd floor is home to 22 residential rooms for the deacons of the Mother See. Renovated in 1974, the building was home to the main dining hall of the Mother See until 2002, when it was moved to the new Monastic Residence.
- Yeremian cells monastic residence: built in 1892–93 through the efforts of bishop Yeremia Galustian. It served the students of Gevorkian Seminary until the Soviet occupation in 1920. During the 1950s, it was returned to the Mother See through the efforts of Catholicos Vazgen I. In 2013–15, the two-storied building was entirely renovated through the efforts of the Mardigian family from the United States. Currently, the building serves as a residence for the clerical members of the Brotherhood of Holy Etchmiadzin, as well as the visiting guests of the Armenian Church.
- Vanatoon monastic guesthouse: a three-storied small building opened in 1978, through the donations of Calouste Gulbenkian Foundation. Consisted of 20 residential units, the building is designated to serve the visiting clergymen and guests of the Mother See. It was entirely renovated in 2007 with the financial assistance of James Kaloustian.
- Gevorkian Seminary dormitory: built in 1997–99 through the efforts of Catholicos Garegin I. It was designed by architect Artsruni Galikyan and the construction was funded by Vahan and Anoush Shamlian from Fresno, California. The three-storied building is designated to host 150 students of the Gevorgian Seminary.
- Brotherhood Residence: a 250-meters long two-storied structure connected to the Ghazarapat and Vanatoon monastic residences, was officially opened on August 31, 2002. The building was designed by architect Ruben Azatyan, while the construction was fulfilled through the donations of Richard Manoogian; an Armenian benefactor from Michigan. The building has 82 residential rooms.
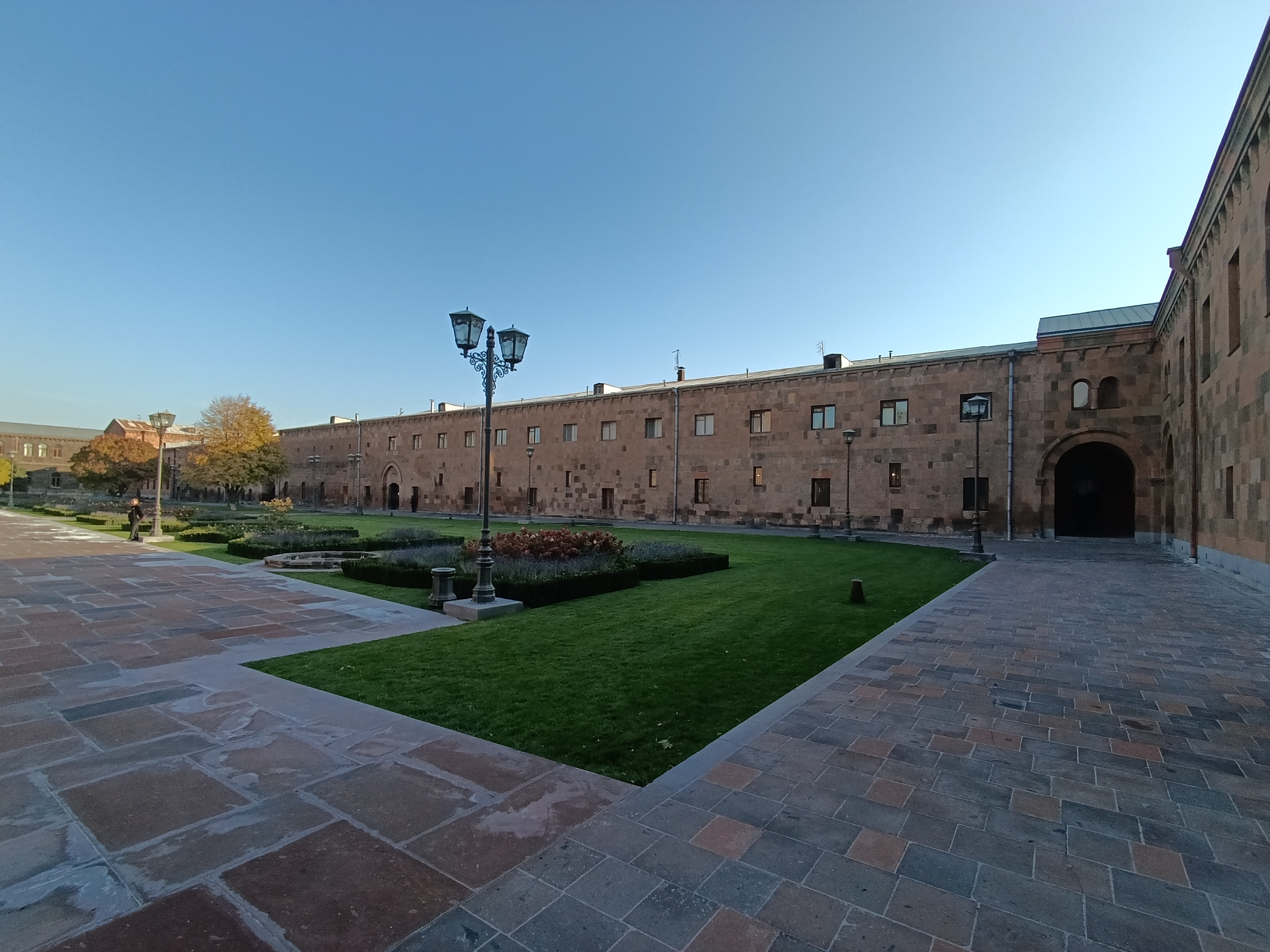
Ghazarapat deacons' residence

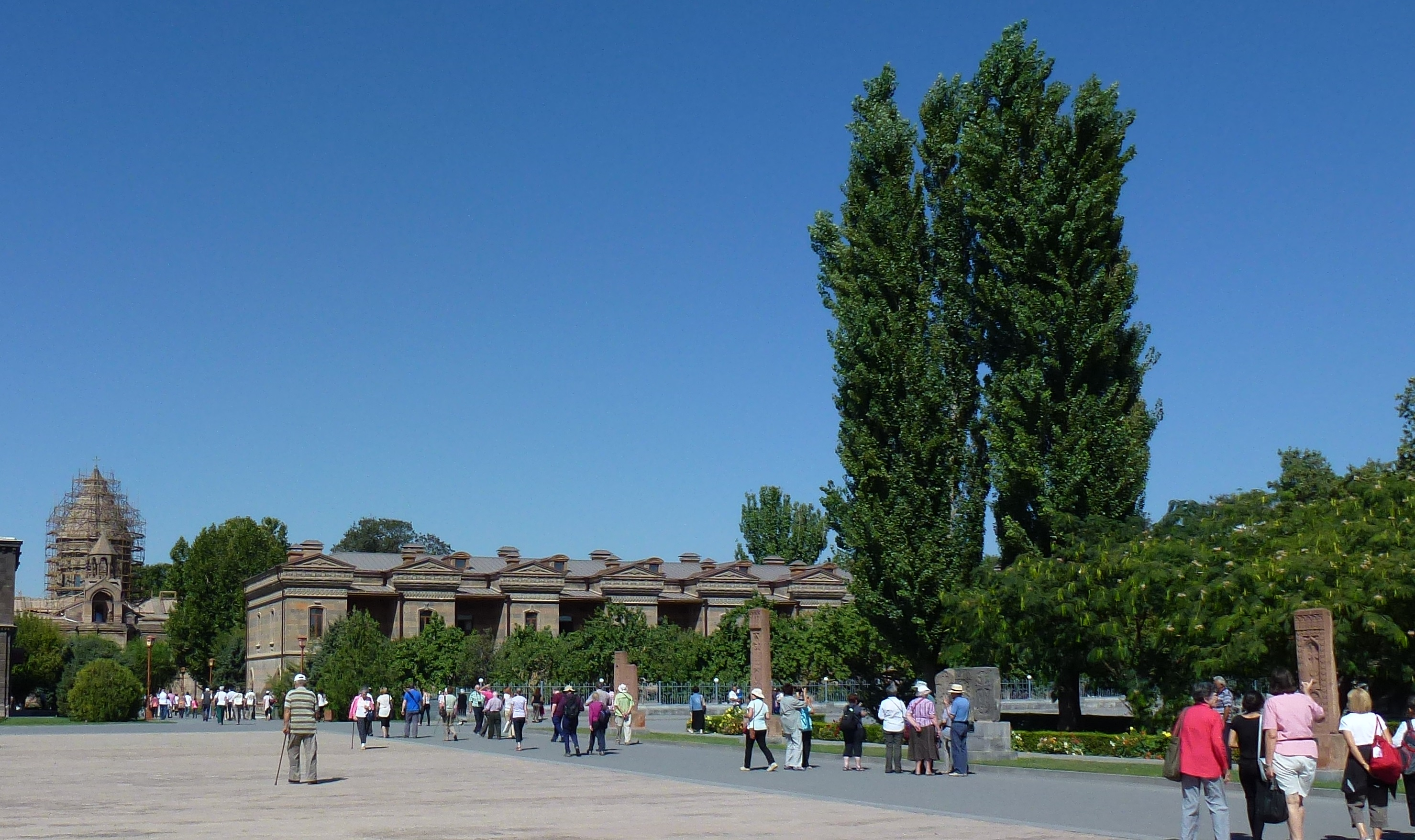
Yeremian cells monastic residence

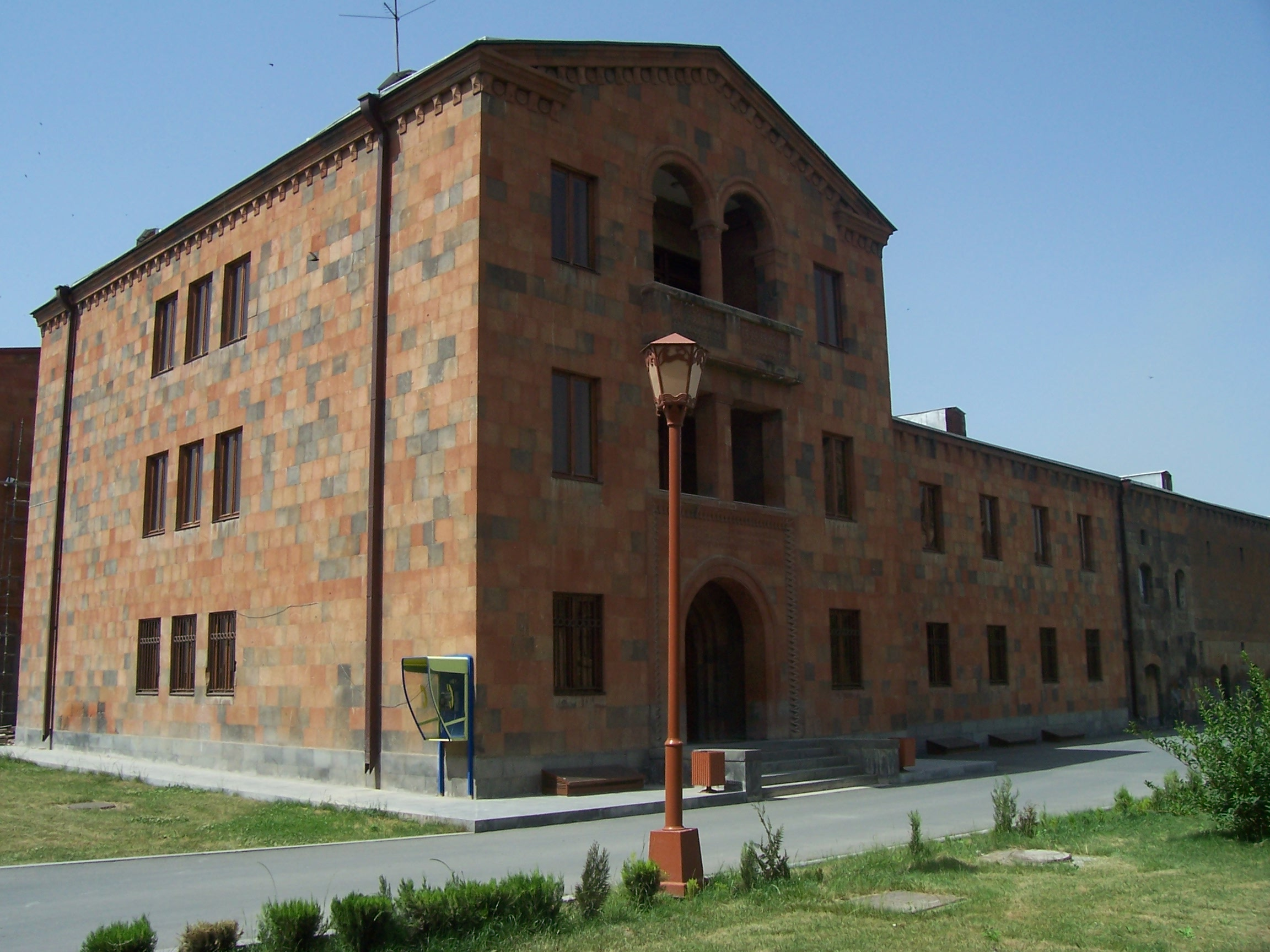
Vanatoon monastic guesthouse

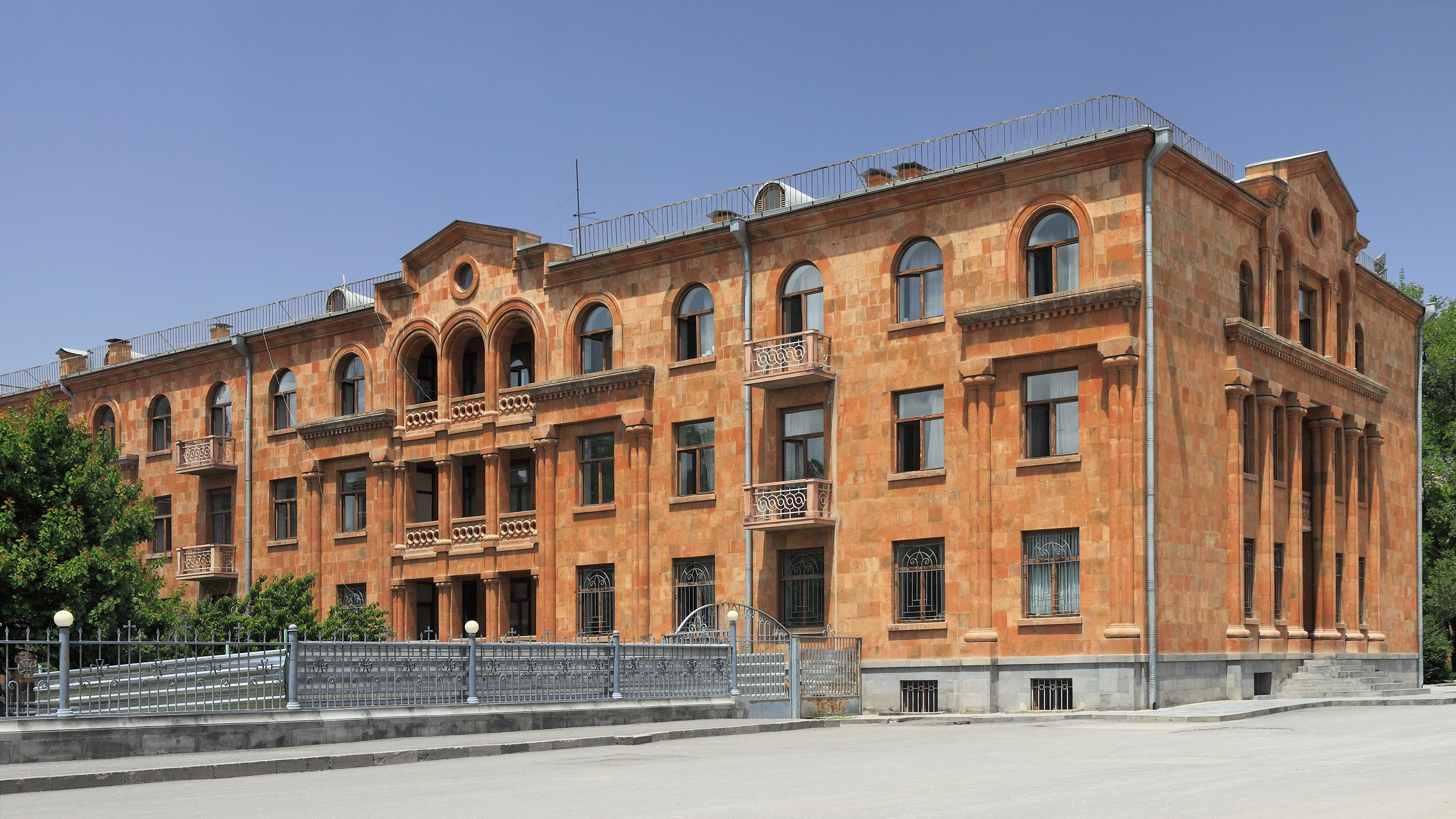
Gevorkian Seminary dormitory

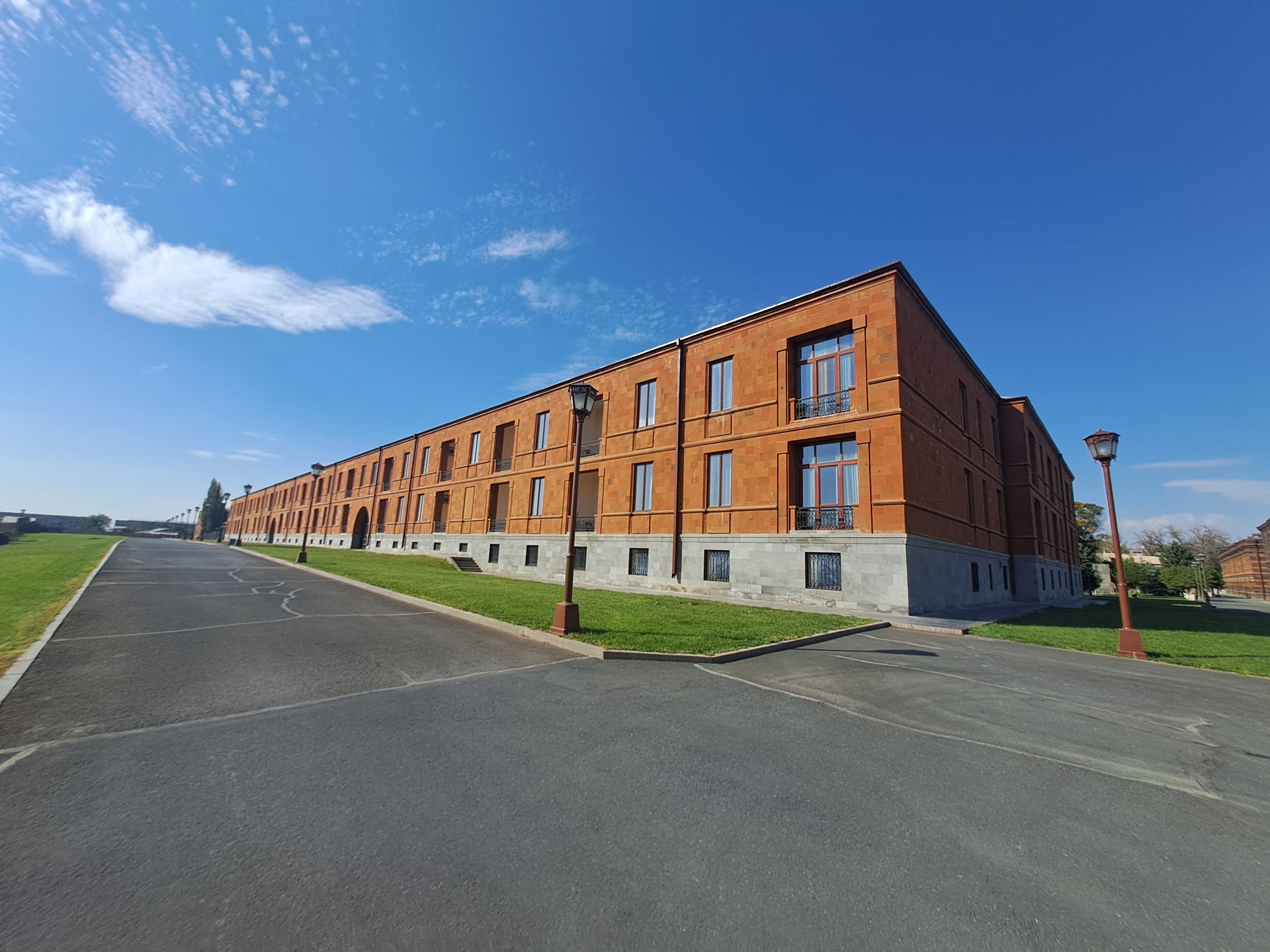
Brotherhood Residence

=== Educational institutions ===
- Gevorkian Theological Seminary: built in 1874 by Catholicos Gevork IV. A new extension designed by architect Jim Torosyan was connected to the old building in 2013.
- Christian Education Center at the old Matenadaran. It was originally built in 1908–11 to serve as a manuscripts depositary (matenadaran). After the Soviet occupation, the building served as the main premises of Gevorkian Seminary between 1945 and 1997. Currently, the building is home to the Christian Education Center as well as many other social committees of the Mother See.
- Karekin I Centre of Theology and Armenology, operating since June 26, 2000. The new building was officially opened on September 28, 2015. It was designed by architect Artavazd Nazaretian and funded by Haig and Elza Titizian from London.
- Eurnekian School: the new building of the school is located within the territory of the Mother See complex. The construction was launched in 2012 and fulfilled through donations from Eduardo Eurnekian. The official inauguration ceremony of the school took place on 14 September 2017, for the 2017–18 educational year.
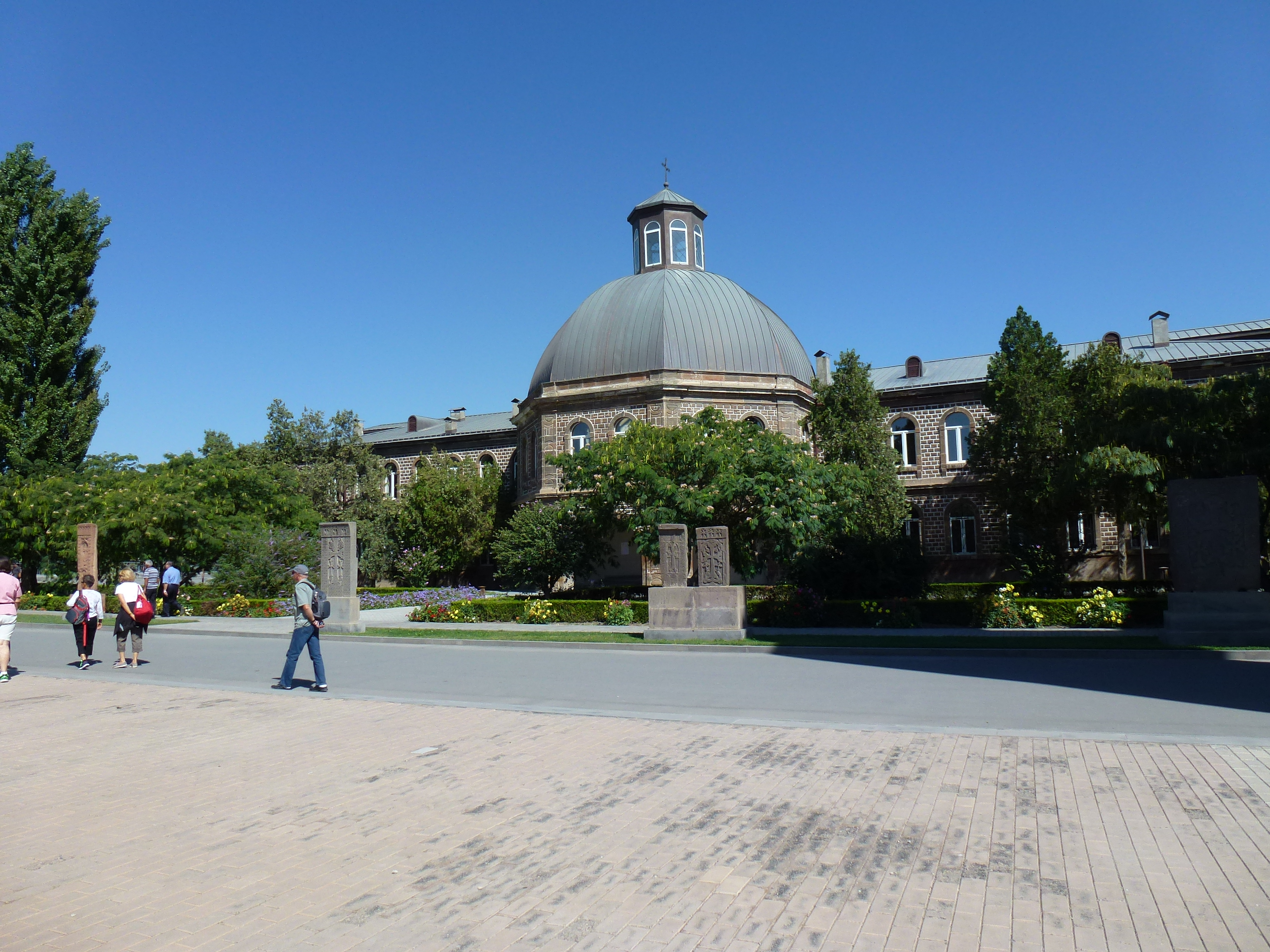
Gevorkian Theological Seminary

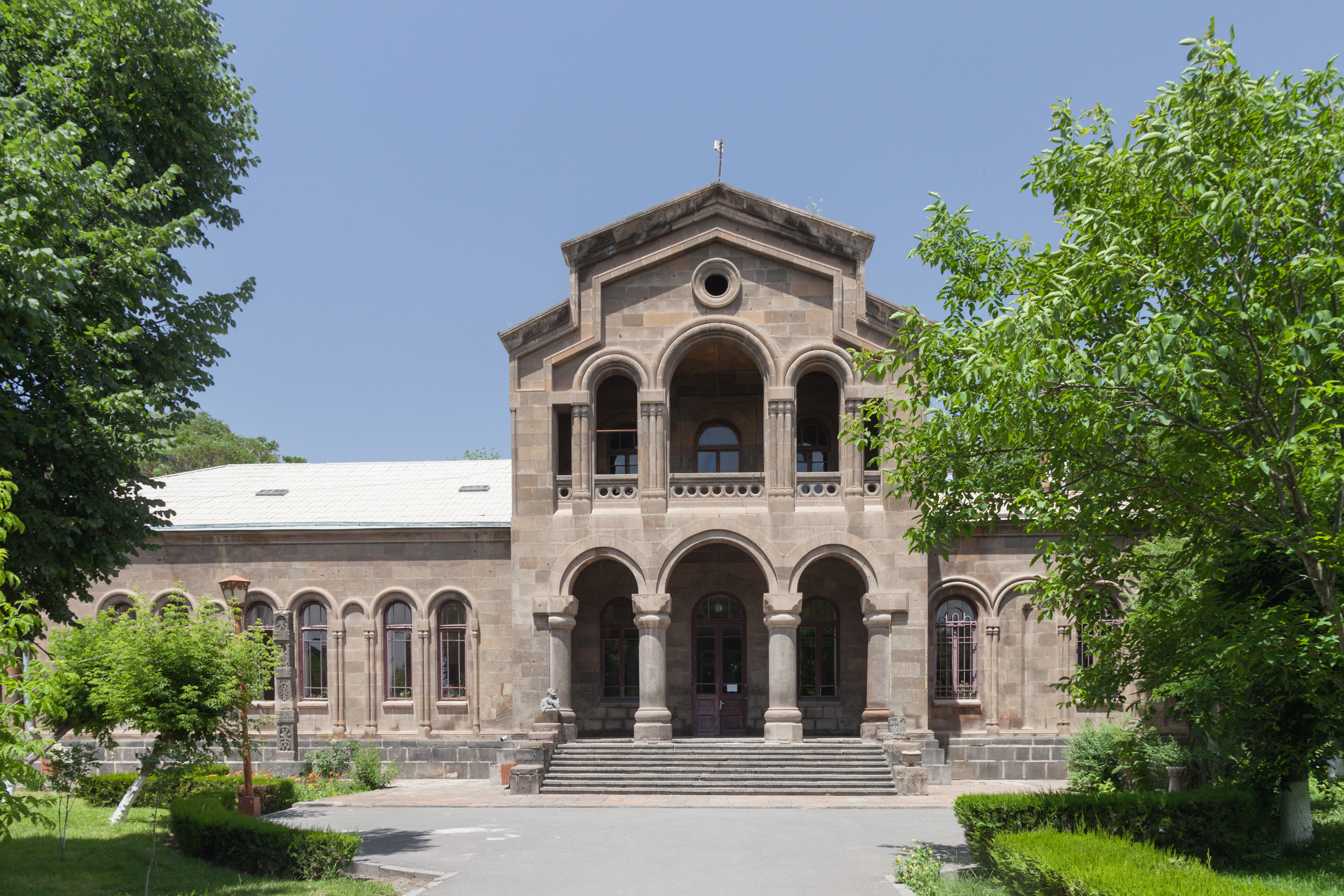
Christian Education Centre at the old Matenadaran

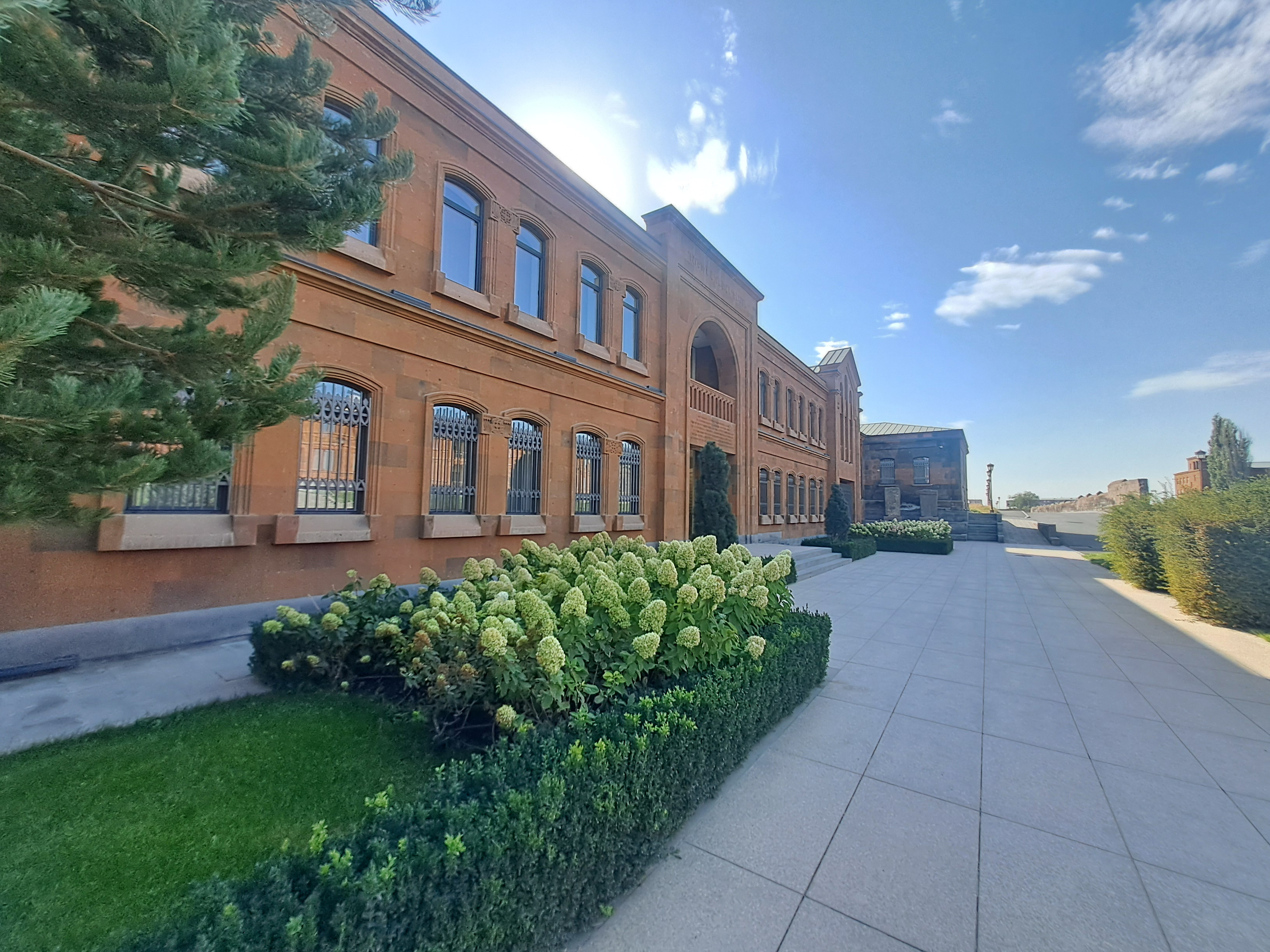
Karekin I Centre of Theology and Armenology

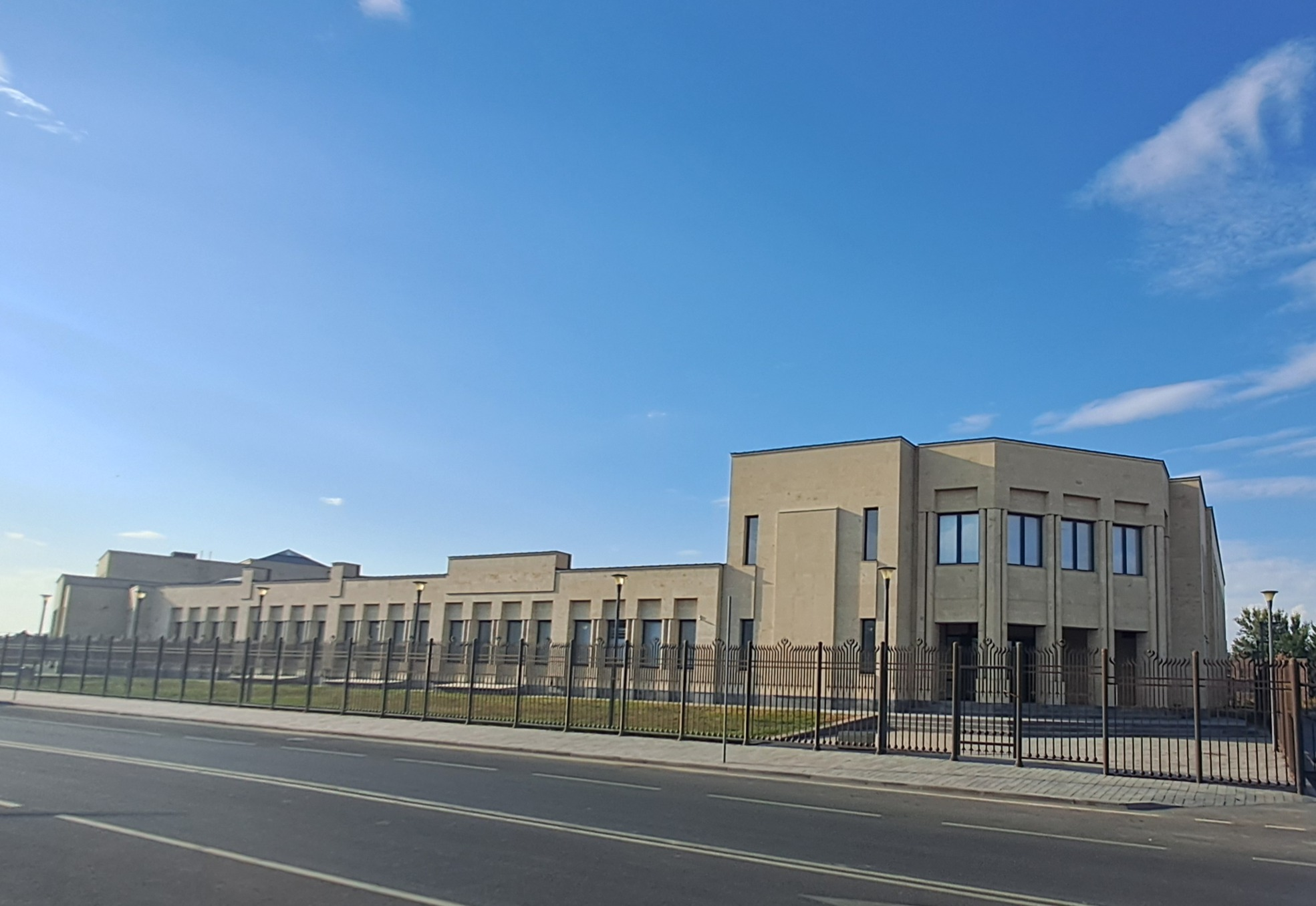
Eurnekian School

=== Museums and libraries ===
- Etchmiadzin Cathedral Museum: built in 1869 by Catholicos George IV adjacent to the Mother Cathedral, at the southeast of the main altar. The museum is home to a variety of valuable pieces, considered as sacred items by the Armenian Church.
- Catholicosal Museum Old Veharan: or the old pontifical residence, built in 1738–41 through the efforts of Catholicos Lazar I and served as the pontifical residence for 20 Catholicoi until 1962. In 1968, the building has been turned into Catholicosal Museum (Armenian: Կաթողիկոսական թանգարան) through the efforts of Catholicos Vazgen I. It has been renovated in 2010–14 through donations from the Armenian General Benevolent Union and is currently home to a large collection of personal items of different Armenian Catholicoi as well as the Kings of Armenia.
- Printing house and Bookstore: two-storied building to the east of the Cathedral, built and opened in 1888–89 by Catholicos Magar I, to serve as a printing and publishing house of the Mother See. It was fully reconstructed between 1959 and 1962 to serve as a bookstore.
- Khrimian Museum: built and opened in 1896 by Catholicos Mkrtich I of Van and served as a religious museum until the Soviet occupation. The building was used by the Soviets as a military base until 1957 when it was returned to the Mother See. After the independence of Armenia, the building was entirely renovated to serve as a museum of art, housing the works of Arshile Gorky as well as many other renowned artists.
- Alex and Marie Manoogian Treasury House: designed by architect Baghdasar Arzoumanian, the building was officially opened on October 11, 1982. The museum is home to treasures of the Armenian Church throughout the history. In 2013, a new section was opened in the museum housing a variety of old manuscripts of the Armenian Church.
- Vatche and Tamar Manoukian Manuscript Depository: designed by architect Artak Ghulyan, the building was officially opened on October 18, 2011. It is located near the main entrance of the complex, and is currently home to around 80,000 valuable books.
- Ruben Sevak Museum: located in the 1st floor of Ghazarapat building, the museum was officially opened on September 10, 2013, to commemorate the Armenian poet Ruben Sevak, as well as other Armenian intellectuals who became victims of the Armenian genocide. Consisted of 4 large showrooms, the museum is home to more than 200 pieces of paintings, including the works of Sevak.
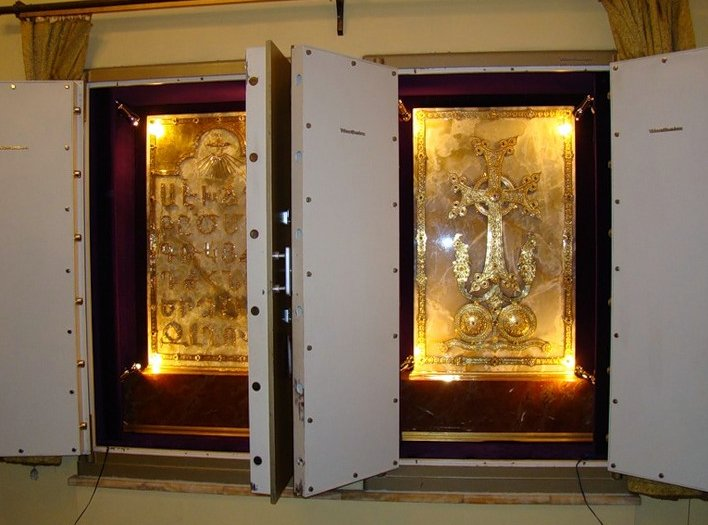
Inside the Etchmiadzin Cathedral Museum

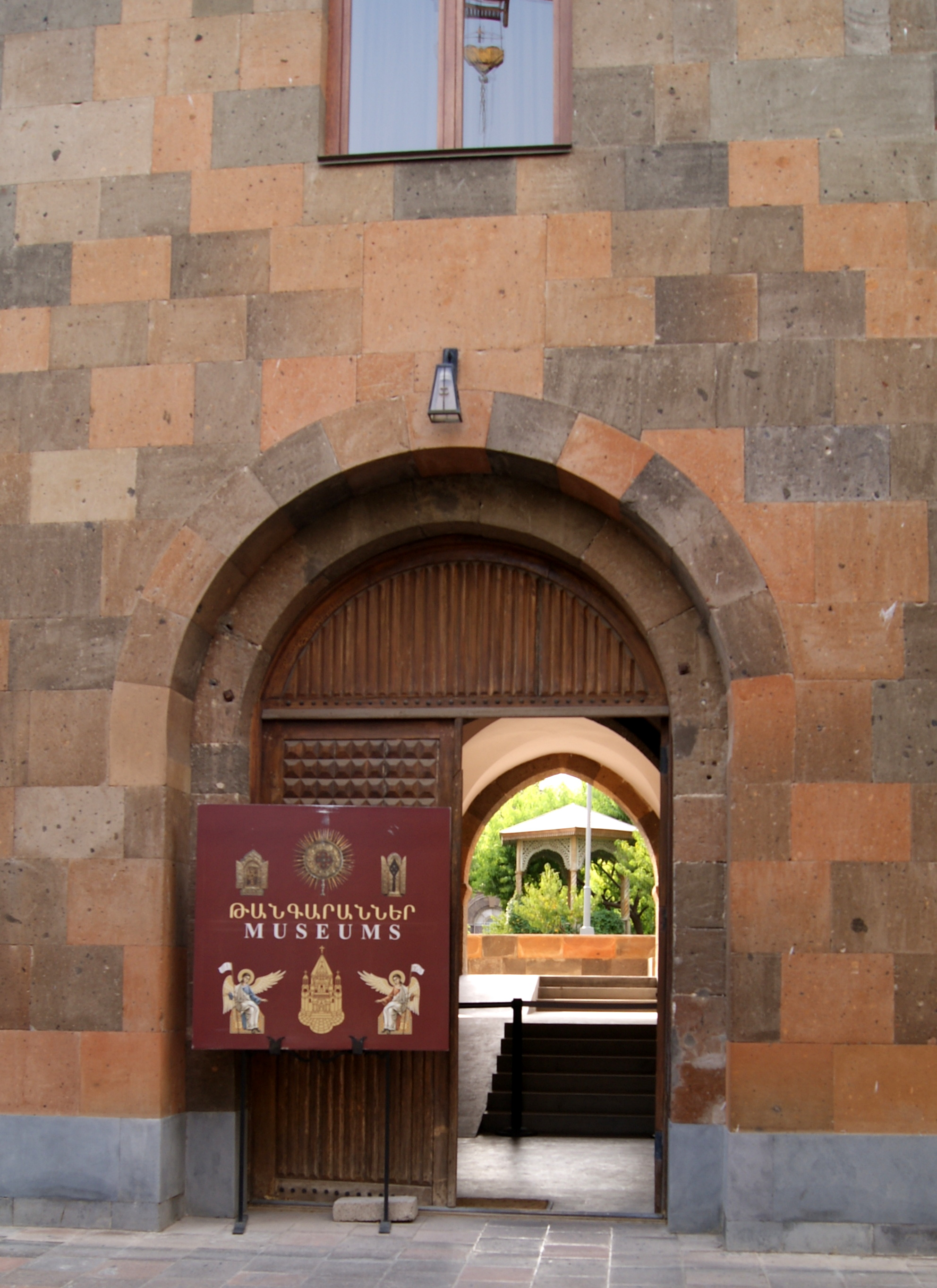
Catholicosal Museum Old Veharan

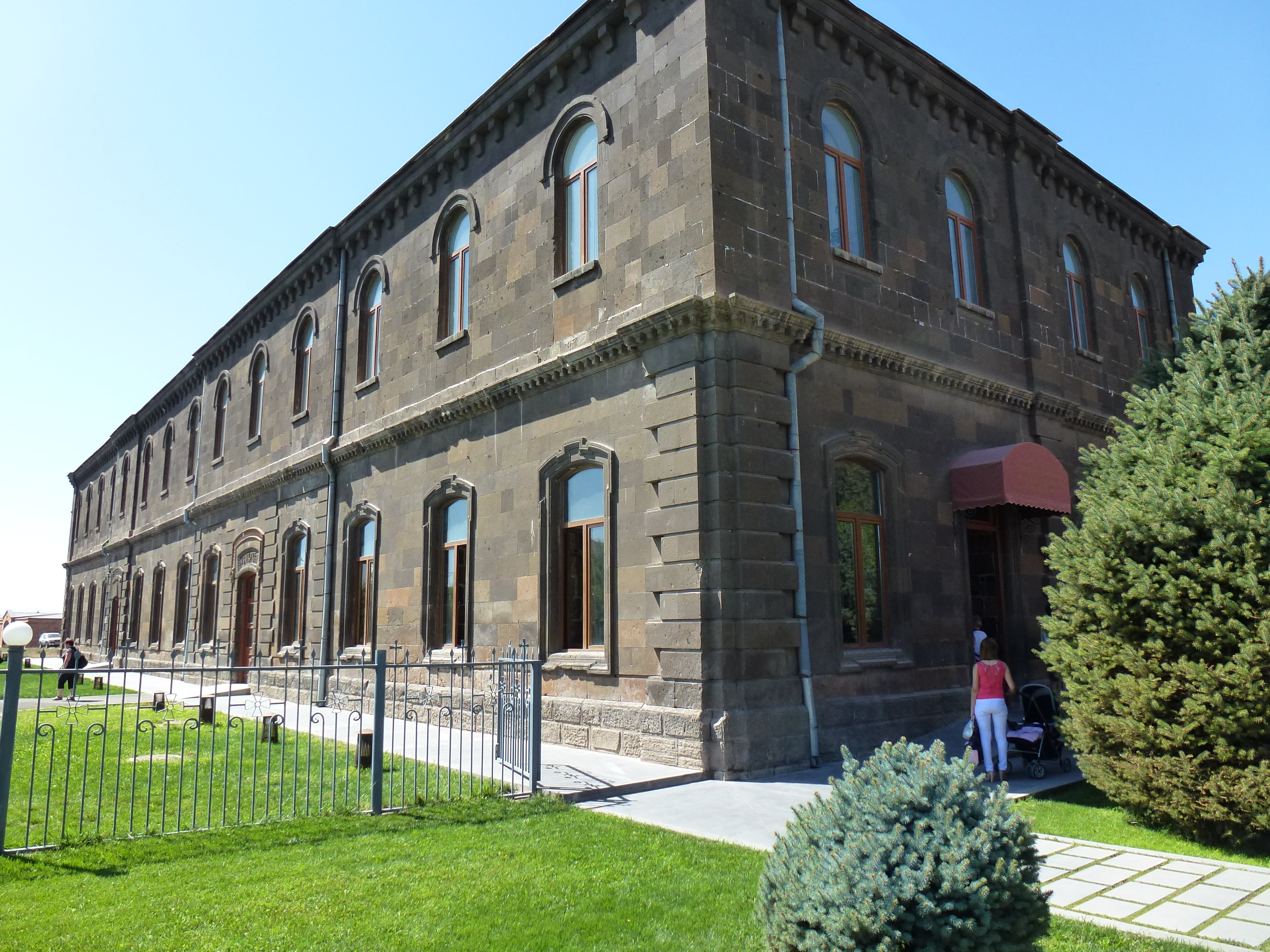
The Printing house and Bookstore

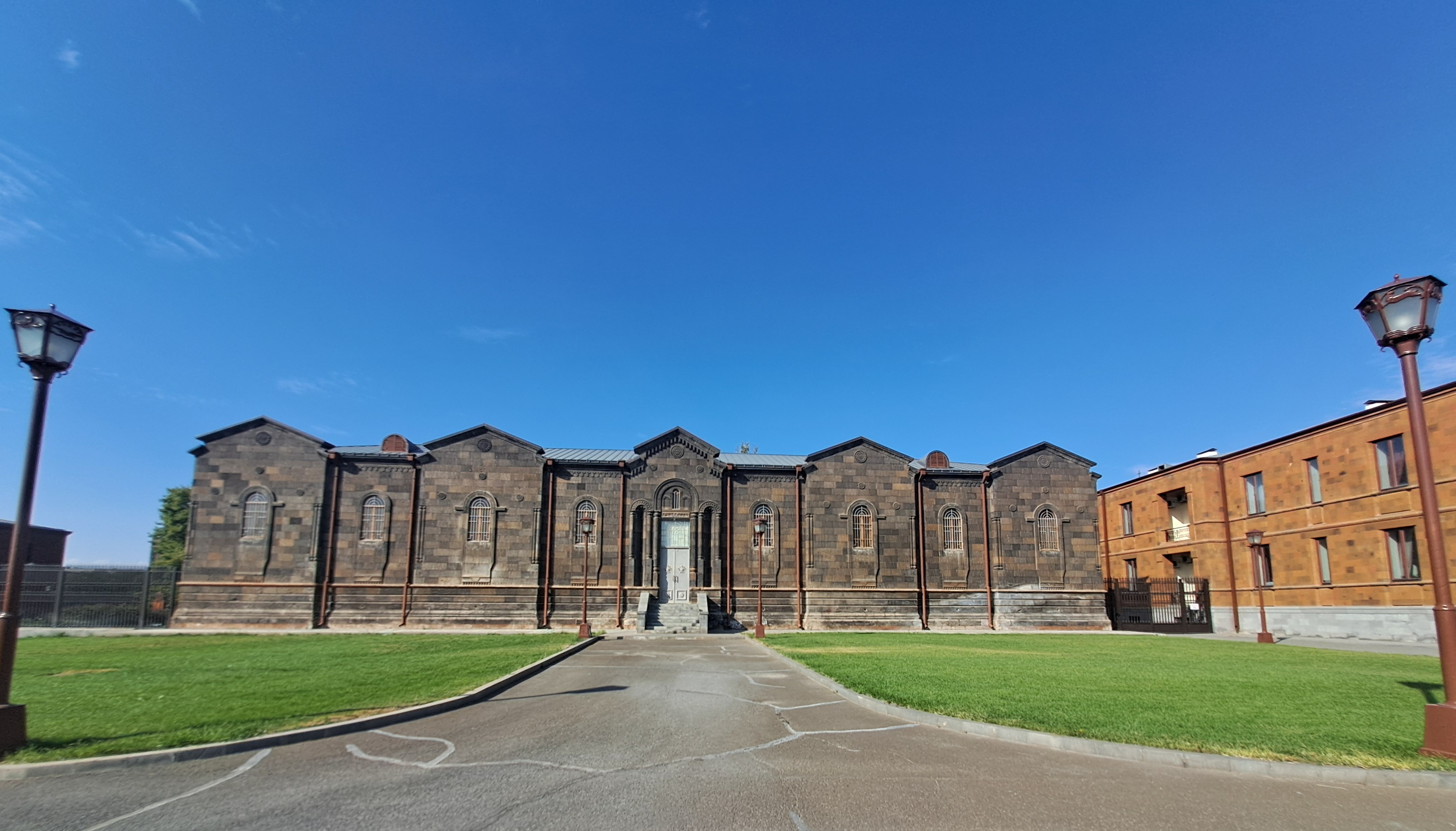
Khrimian Museum

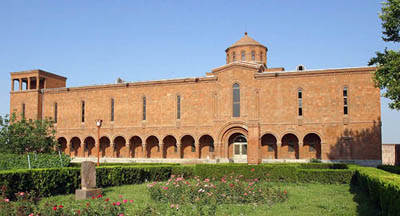
Alex and Marie Manoogian Treasury House

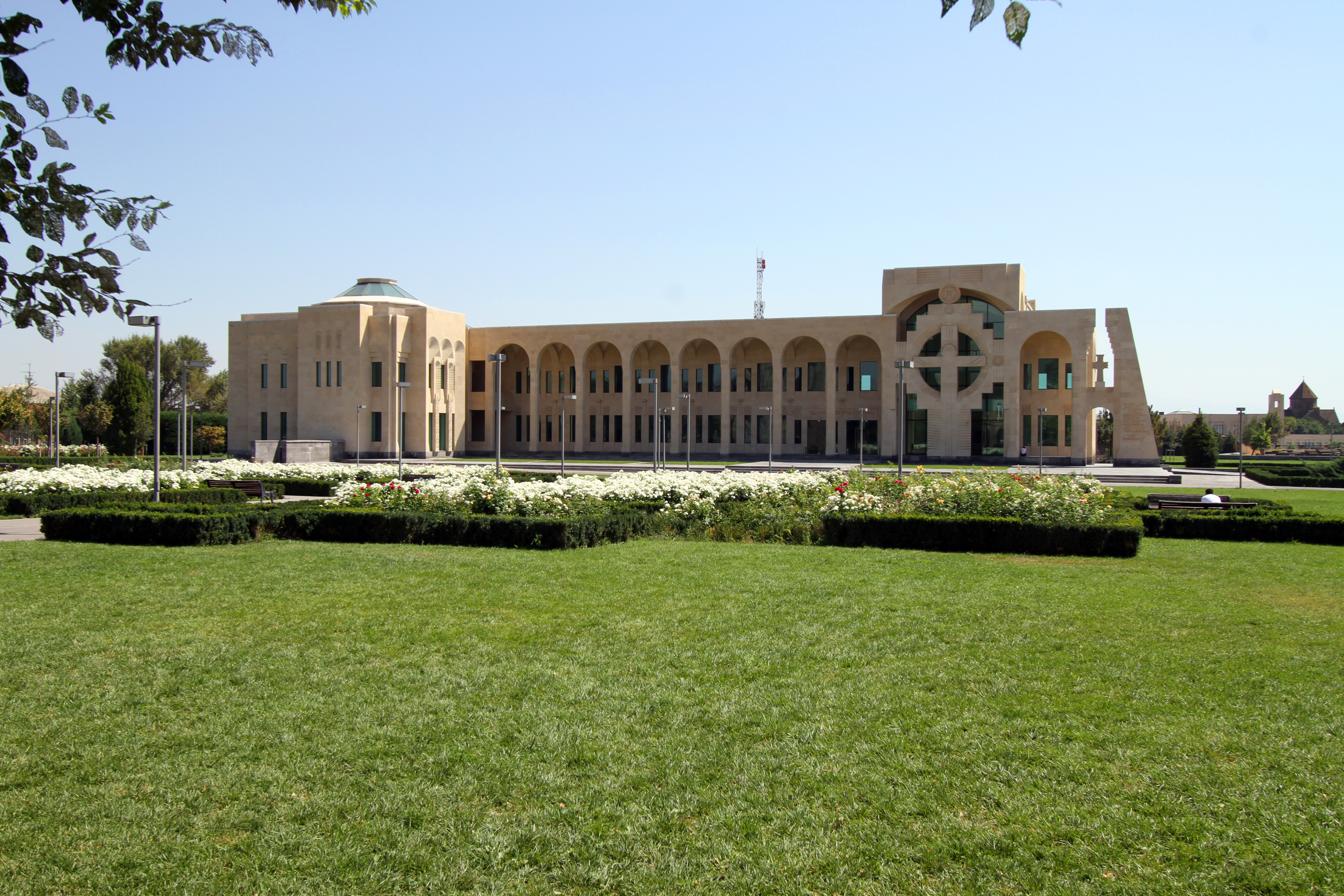
Vatche and Tamar Manoukian Manuscript Depository

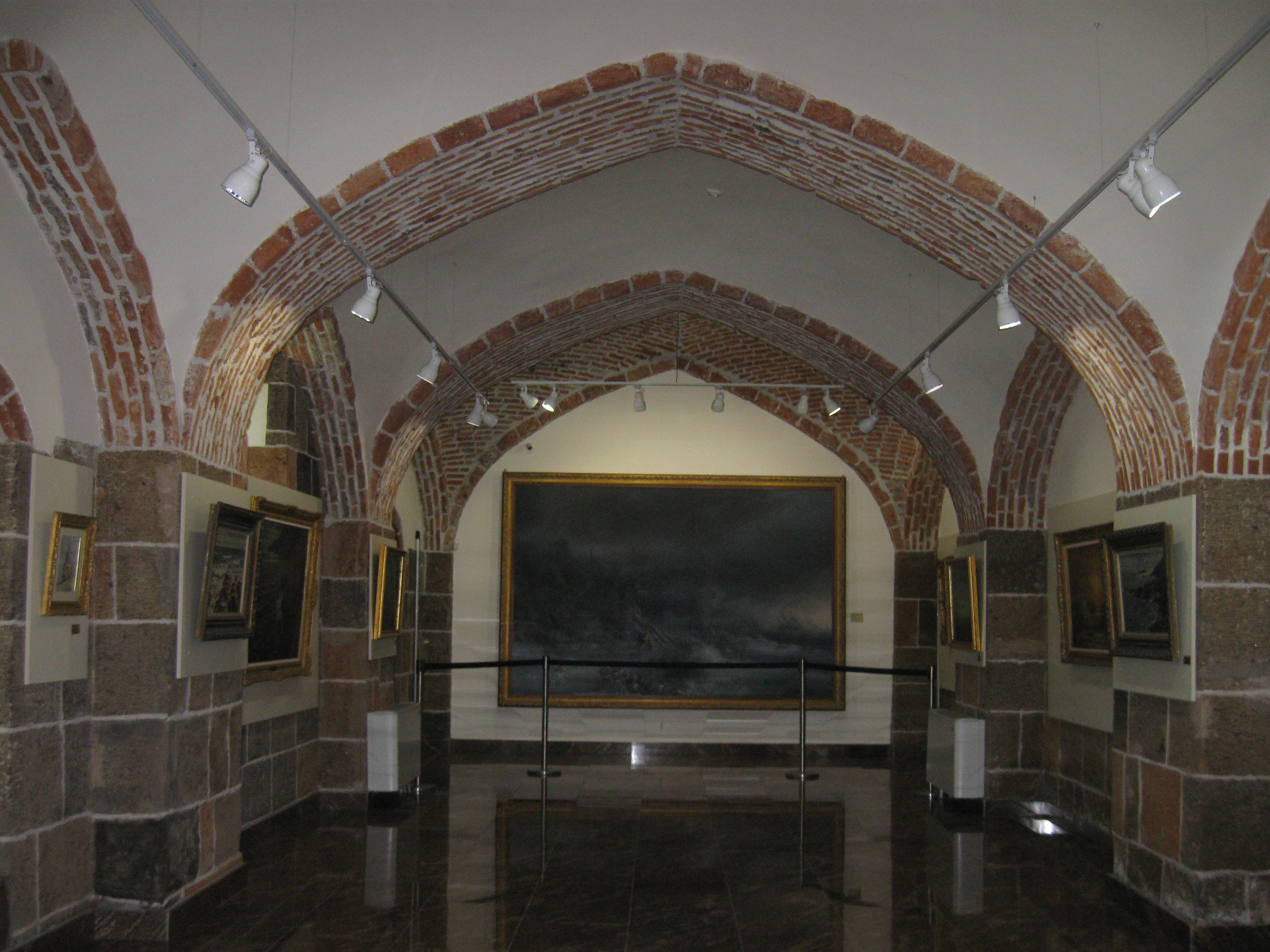
Rouben Sevak Museum

=== Gates ===
- Clock Tower: is a gate topped with a clock built in 1959, located at the north-western side of the complex.
- Gate of Vazgen I (Vazgenian Darbas): erected in March 1961 at the eastern wall of the complex. In 2002, the gate was moved to the northern entrance.
- Gate of King Trdat (Durn Trdata): restored in 1964 on the basis of the well-preserved remains of the old medieval gate. The arch is located on the halfway between the Mother Cathedral and the Veharan Pontifical Residence.
- Gate of Saint Gregory: built in 2001 to become the main entrance to the Mother See.
- Southern Gate near the Khrimian Museum, was built between 2007–09, resembling the Gate of Vazgen I.
- Western Gate near the Manookian Manuscript Depository: erected in 2011, forms the southeastern entrance to the Mother See complex.
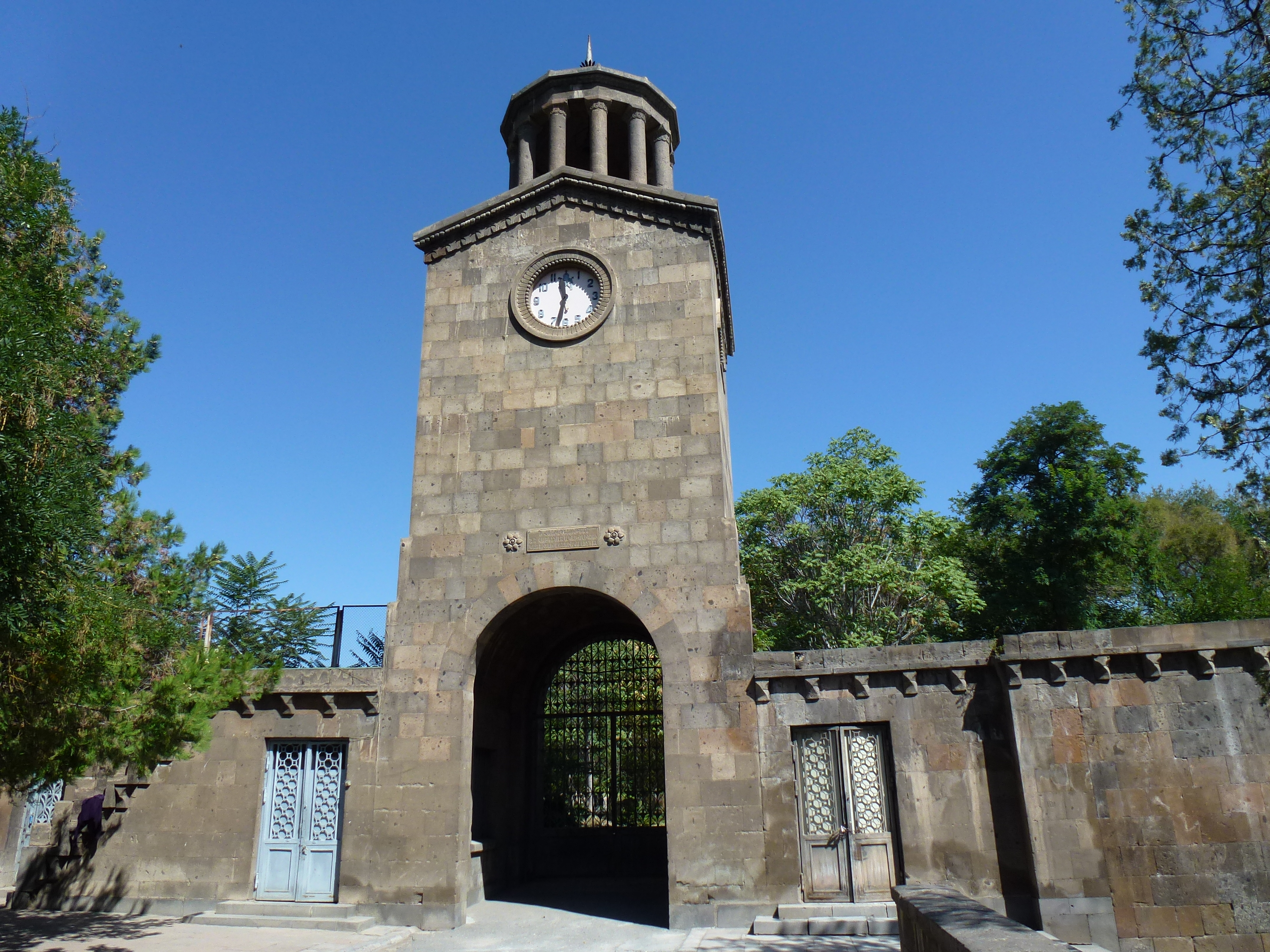
Clock Tower

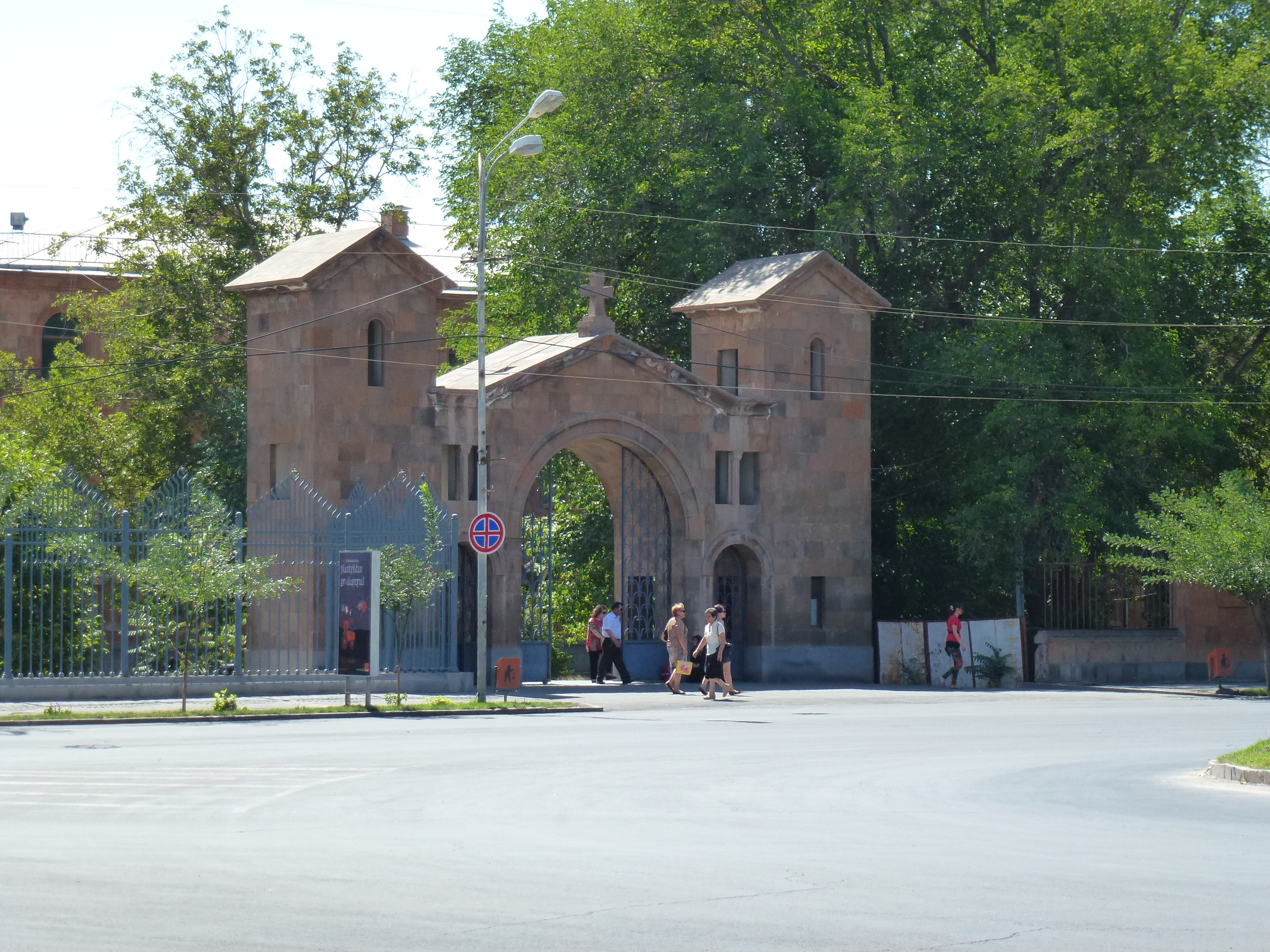
Gate of Vazgen I

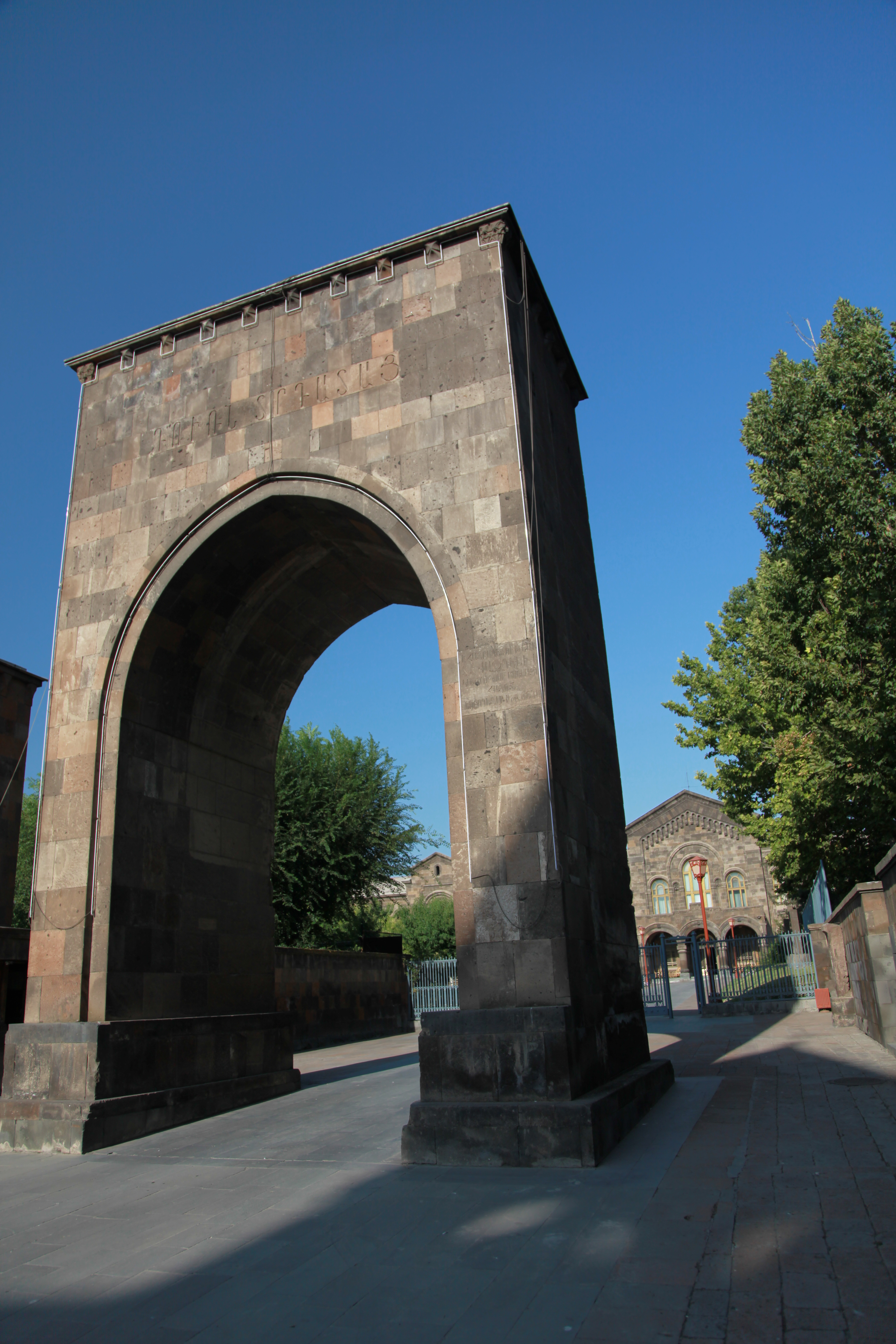
Gate of King Trdat

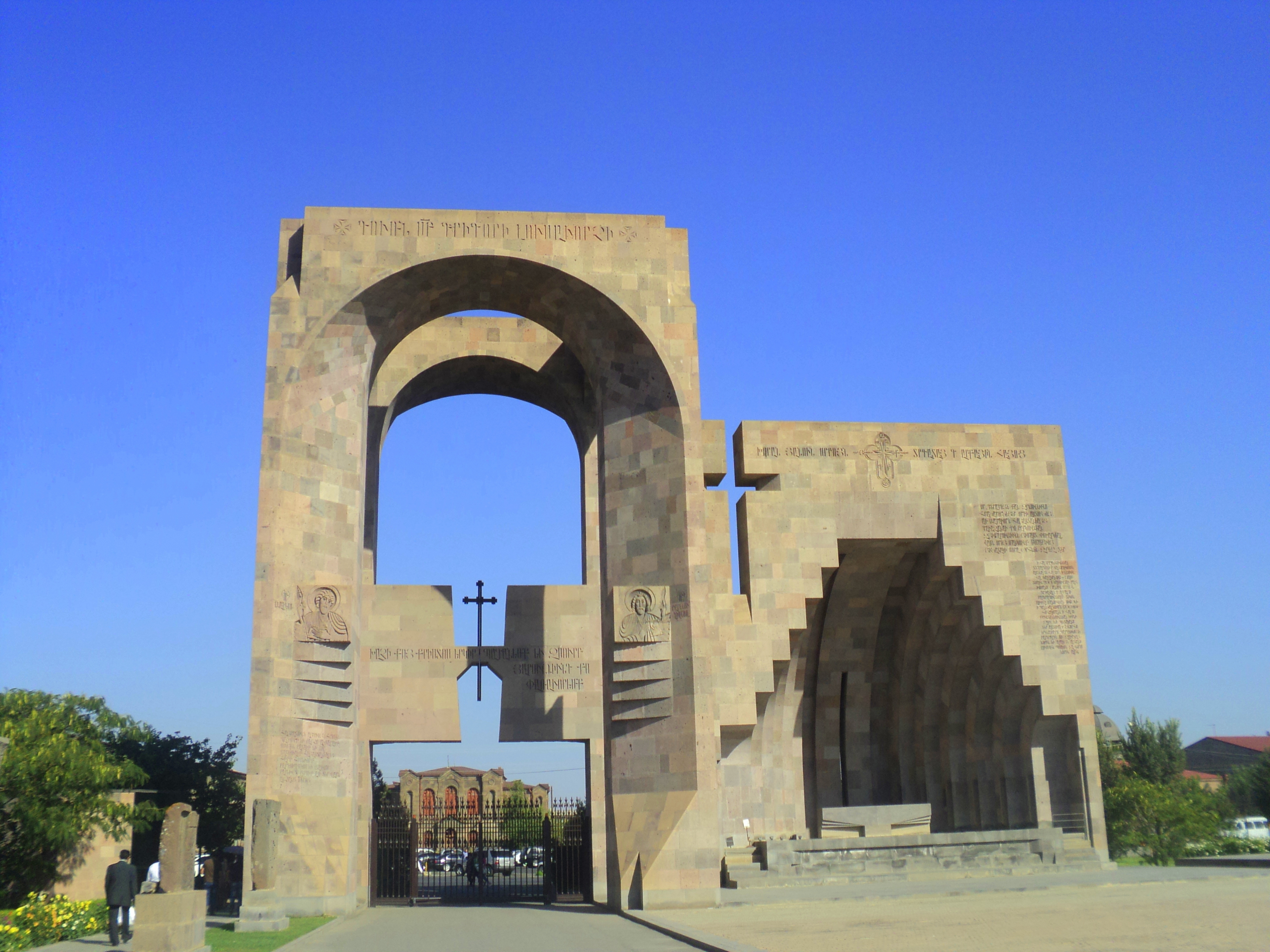
Gate of Saint Gregory

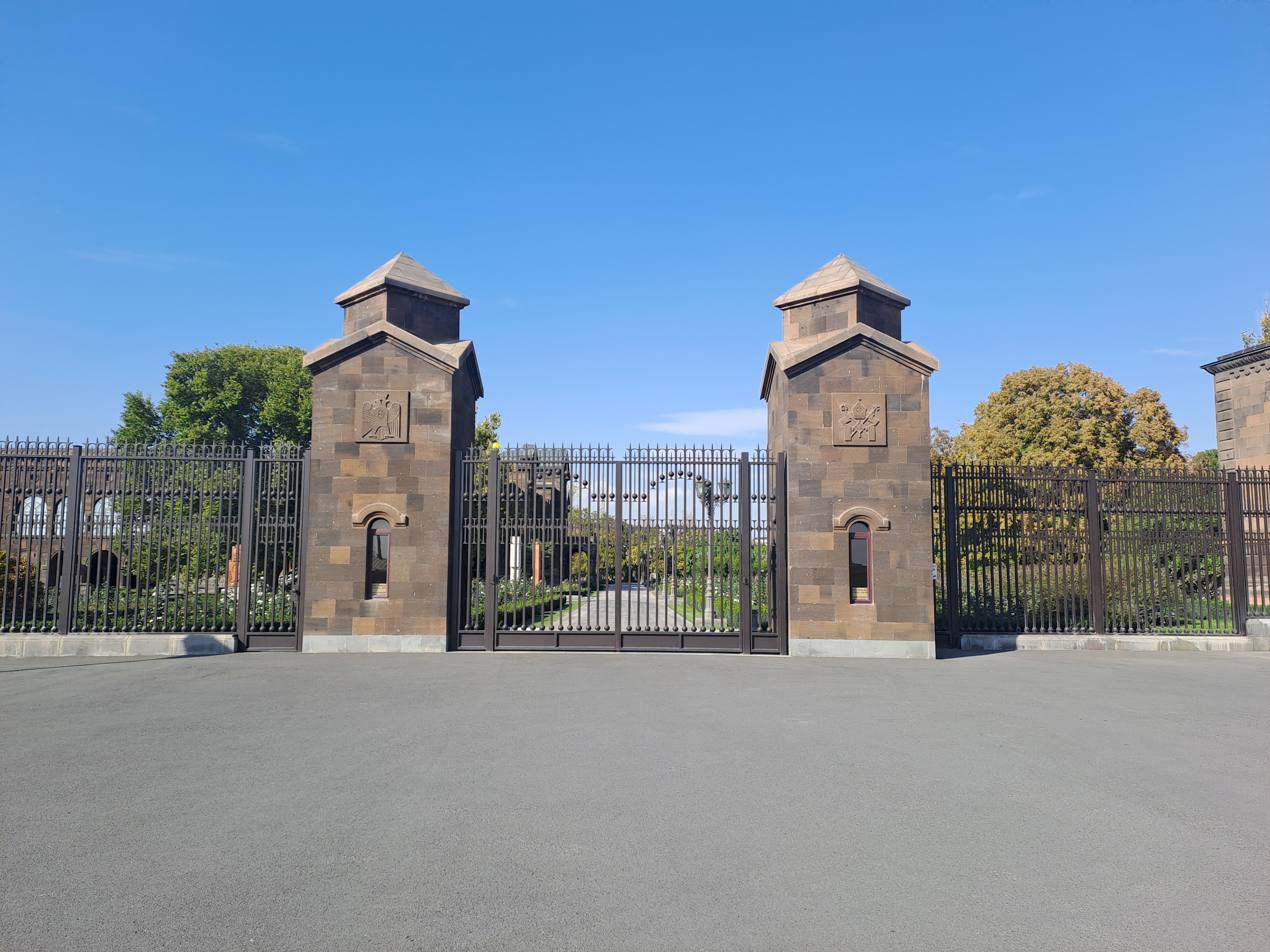
Southern Gate

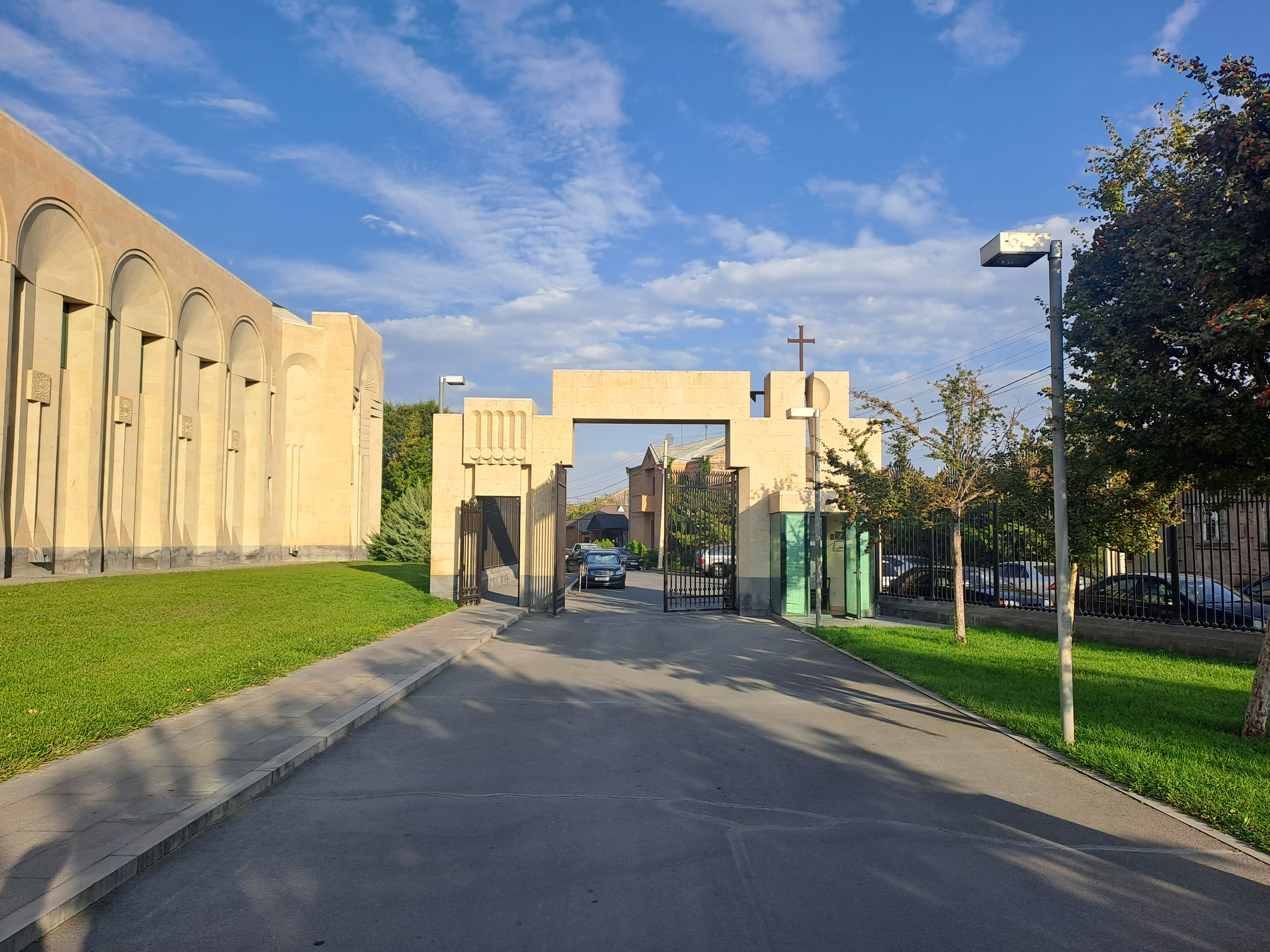
Western Gate

=== Monuments and memorials ===
- Armenian Genocide memorial: a group of Khachkars (cross stones) designed by Rafael Israelyan and erected in 1965, to commemorate the 50th anniversary of the Armenian genocide.
- Katnaghbyur memorial: a spring with khachkar erected in 1967 in memory of the genocide victims of the Kghi region in Western Armenia.
- Memorial spring for Mkrtich Khrimian: erected in 1982 by sculptor Getik Baghdasaryan and architect Yuri Tamanyan.
- Open-air altar: built in 2001 along with the Gate of Saint Gregory to commemorate the 1700th anniversary of the Christianization of Armenia.
- Khachkars of medieval ages as well as the modern periods, including 6 khachkars survived from the destruction of the Armenian cemetery in Julfa, dating back to the 16th and 17th centuries.
- Statues and decorative sculptures.
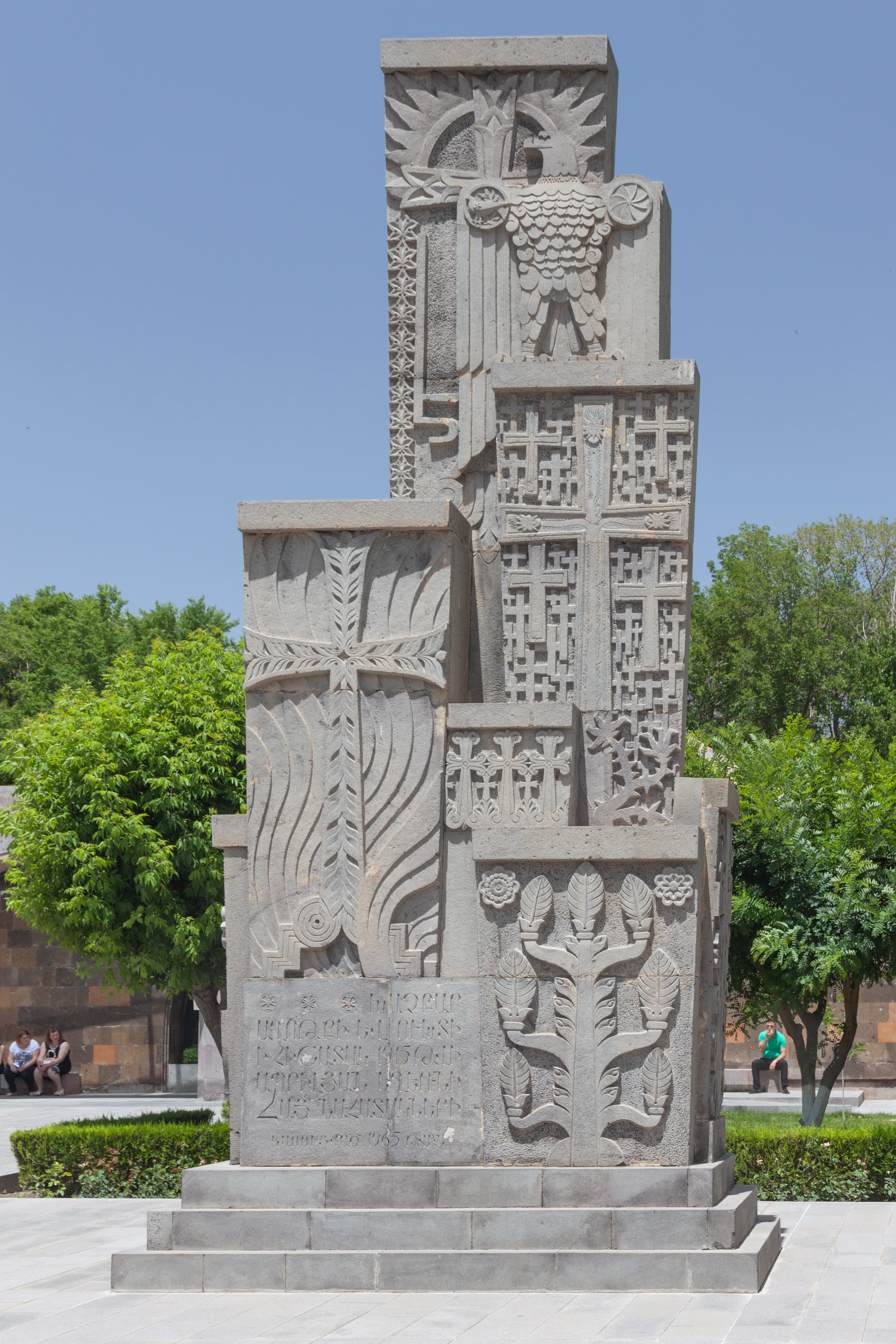
Armenian Genocide memorial

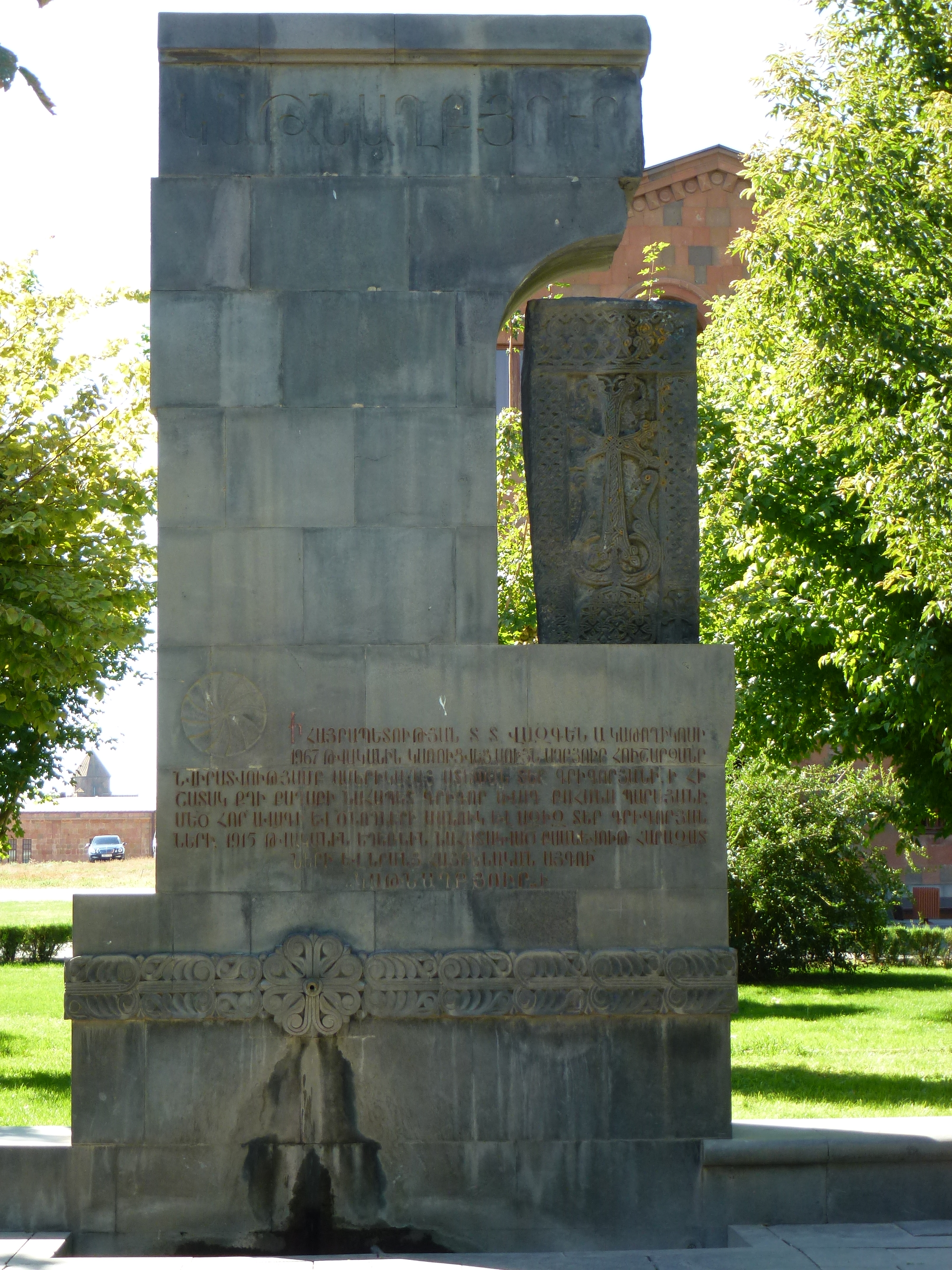
Katnaghbyur memorial

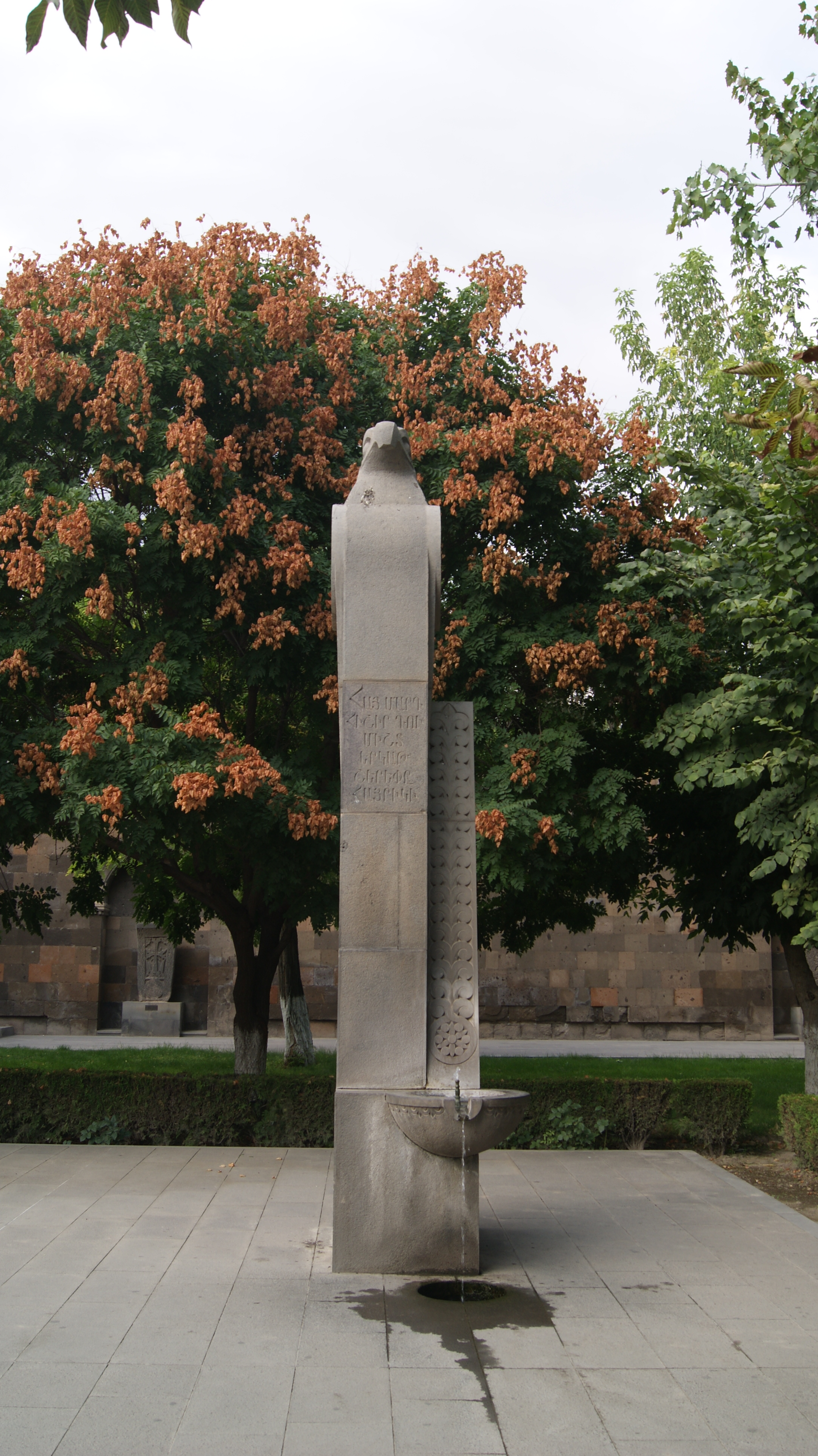
Memorial spring for Mkrtich Khrimian

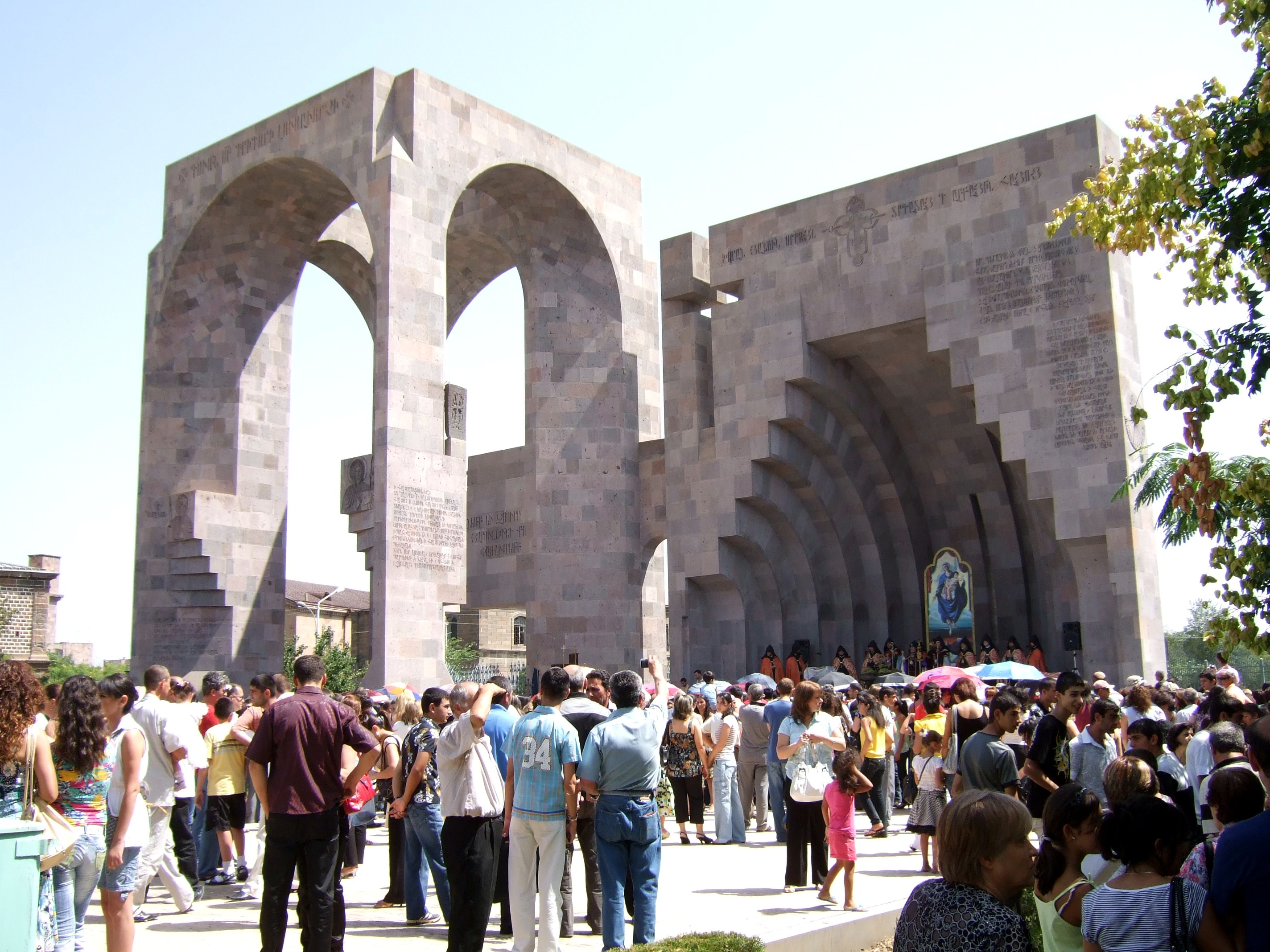
The Open-air altar and grape-blessing ceremony

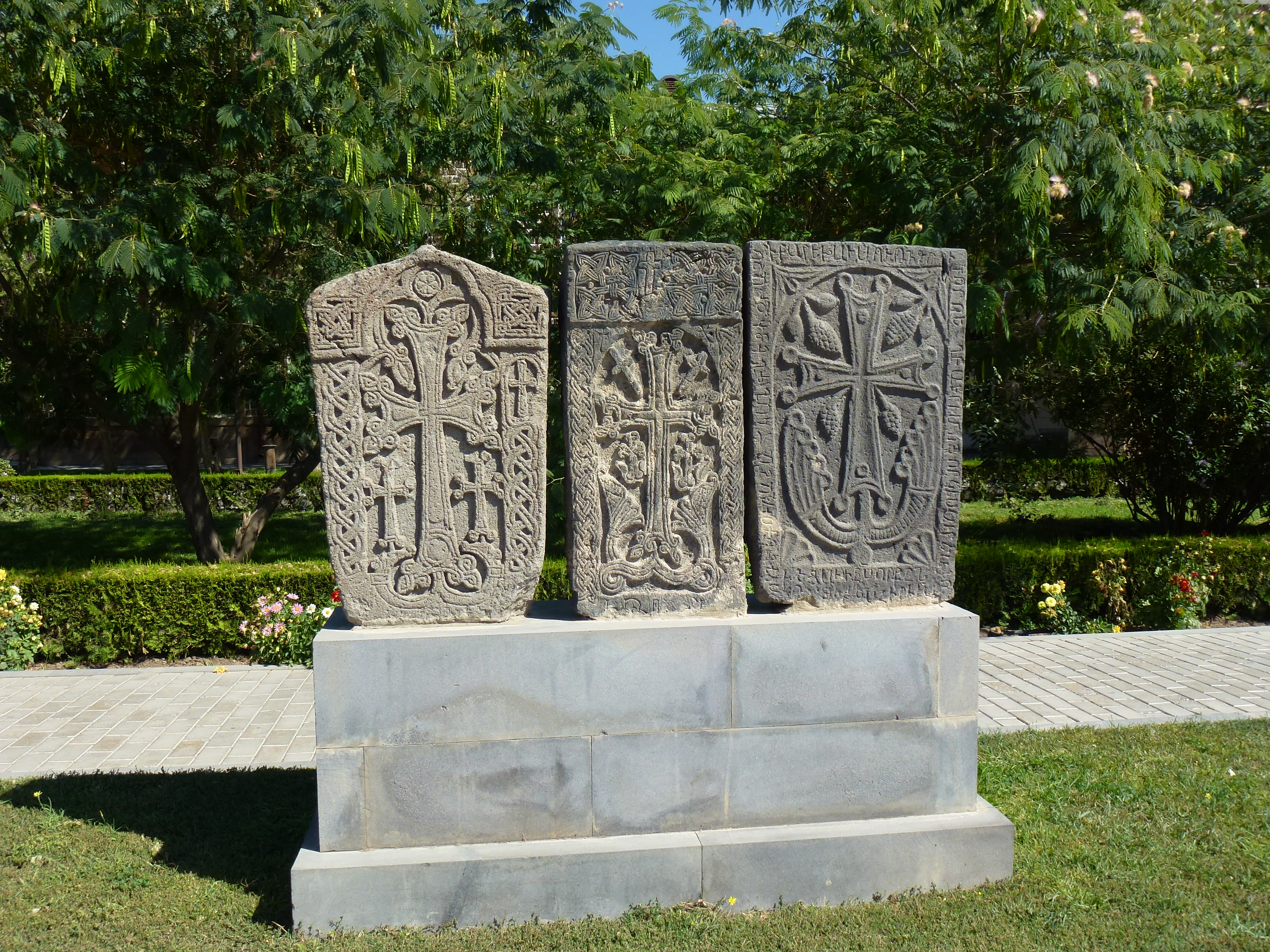
Three Khachkars near the Mother Cathedral

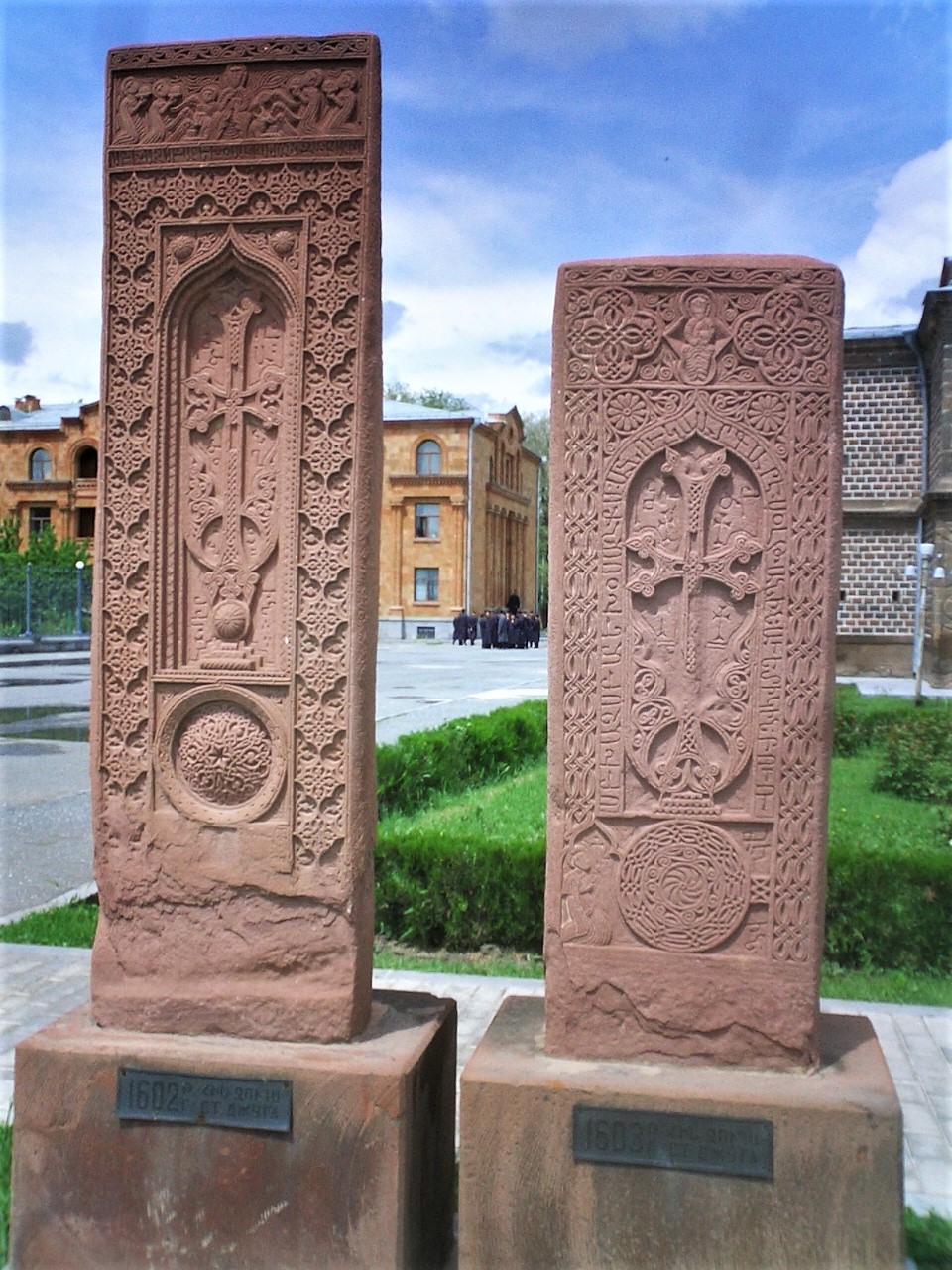
Two Julfa khachkars, dated 1602 and 1603, removed from the graveyard before destruction

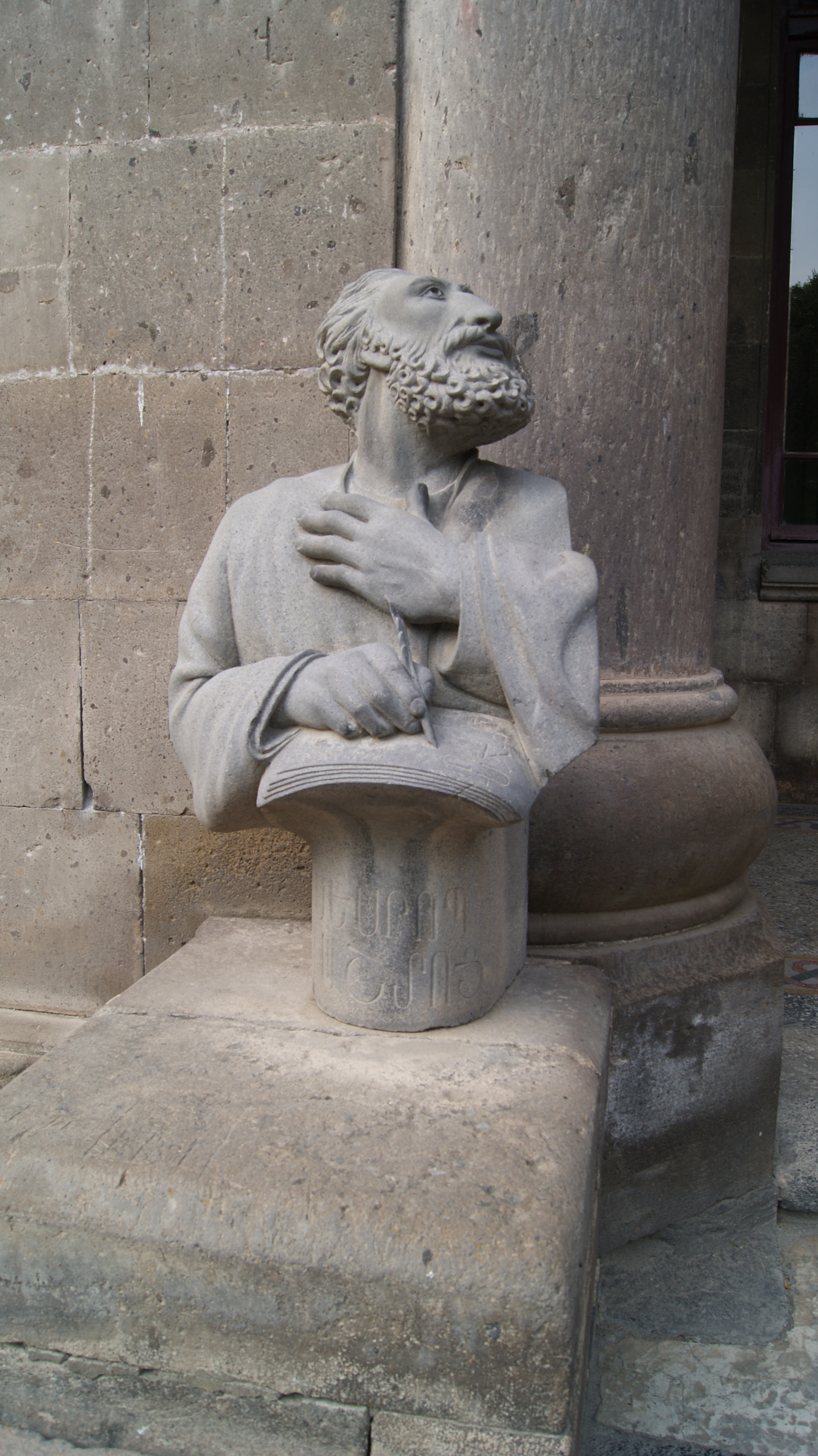
Statue of Mesrop Mashtots

=== Graveyards and tombstones ===
- Cemetery of the Brotherhood of Holy Etchmiadzin: located at the southeastern part of the complex.
- Catholic tombstones: located at the entrance of the Mother Cathedral. It is envisaged to open a special Pontifical Cemetery where all the bodies of the Catholicoi of the Armenian Church are to be buried.
- Catholic Mausoleum and candlelight hall: is located at the west of the Mother Cathedral's main entrance, adjacent to the Old Veharan building. Built in 2025 through donations from benefactors Garnik and Ani Yakubyan, designed by architects Aslan Mkhitaryan and Hayk Mkrtchyan. The structure will serve as a resting place to all Catholicoi, as well as a candle lighting hall for visitors.
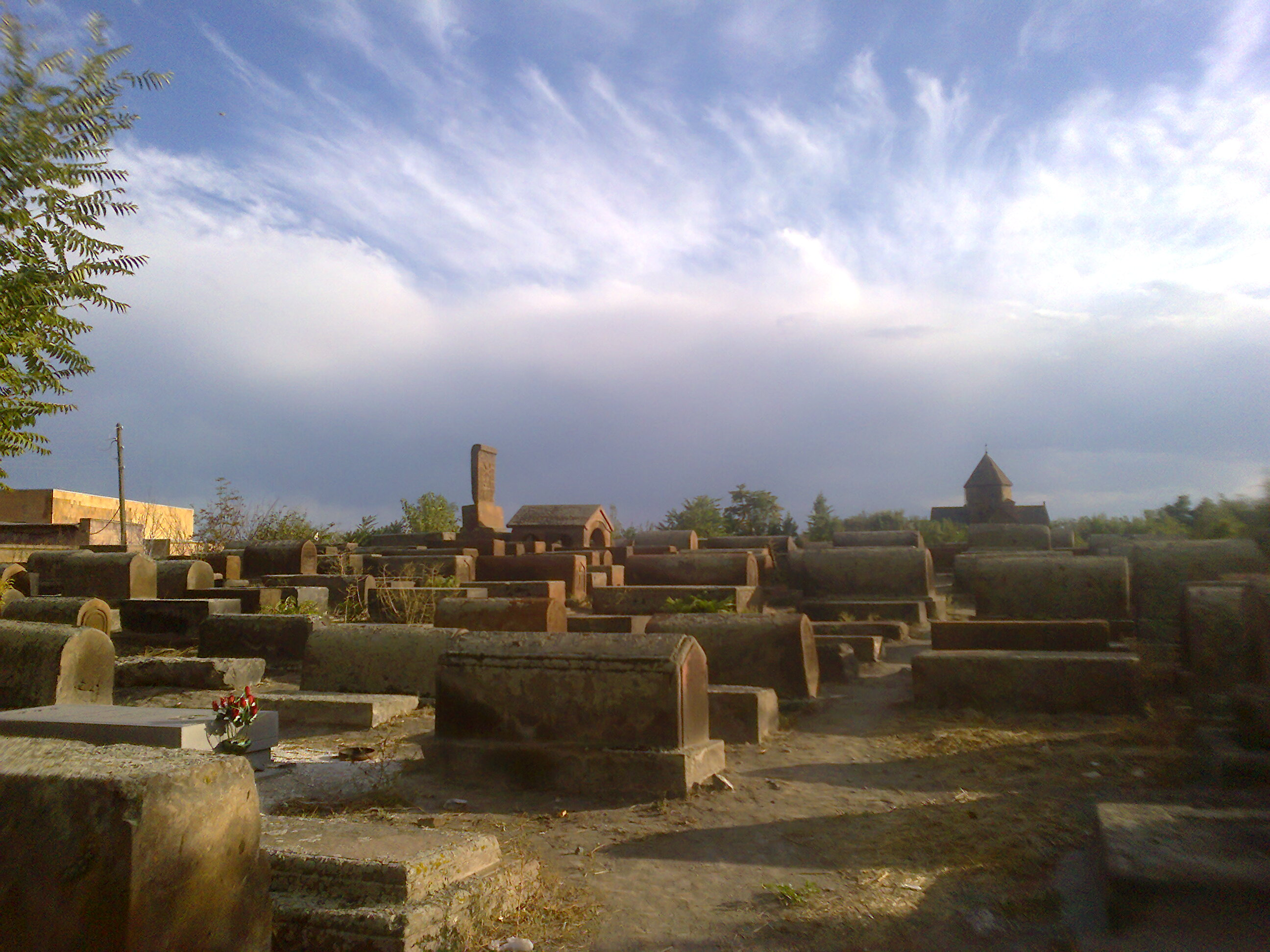
Cemetery of Holy Etchmiadzin

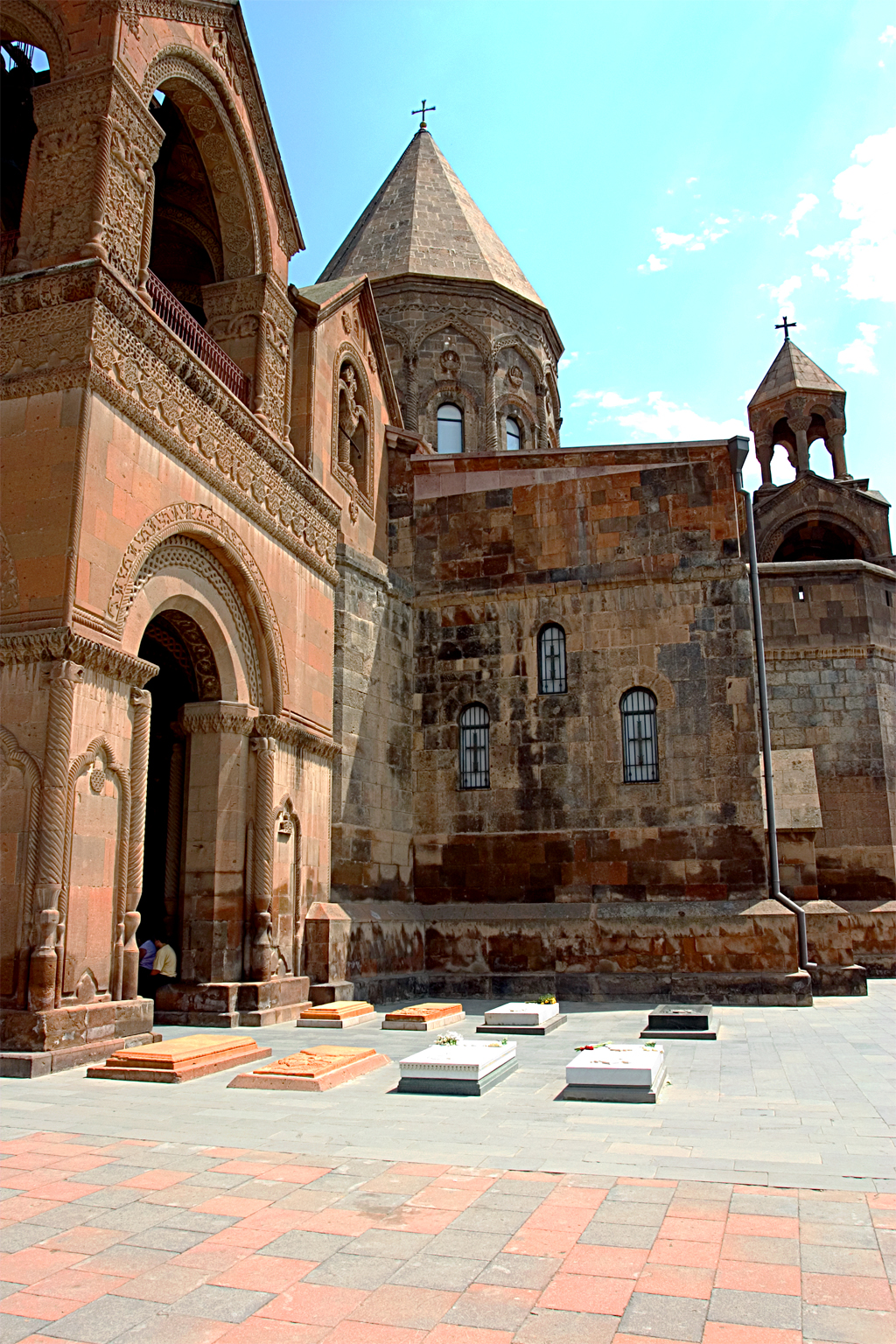
Catholic tombstones near the belfry

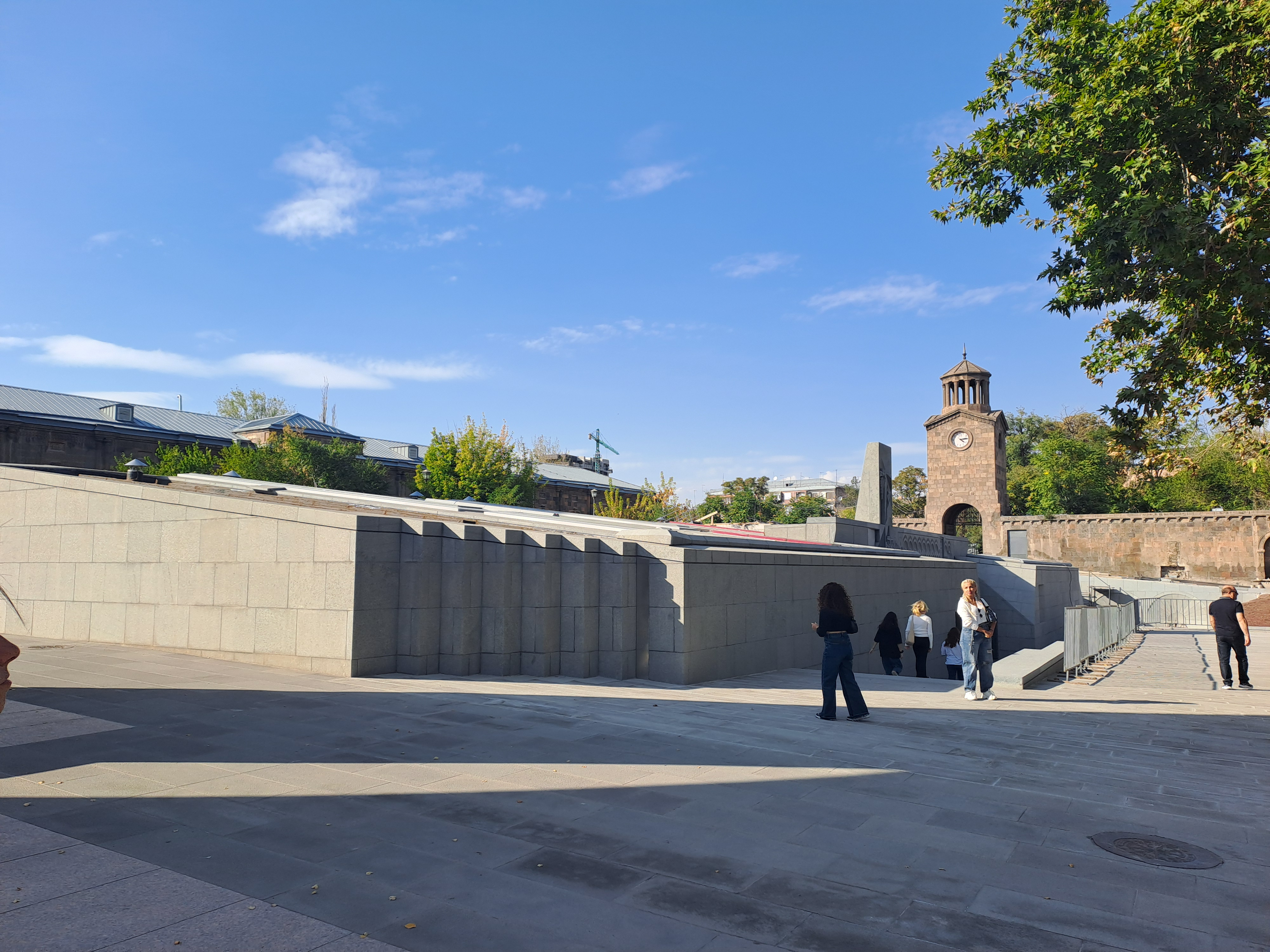
Mausoleum of the Catholicoi and candle lighting hall

=== Service buildings ===
- Northern wall of the Mother See: a 110-meters long fortification lies between the old seminary building and the clock tower, at the north of the Mother Cathedral. The building is currently home to service rooms and offices.
- Refectory building dating back to the 17th century.
- Storage and Service Facility: completed in 2002 through donations from Louise Manoogian Simone. The building is dedicated for logistics management and vehicles services.
- Sports and events centre of Gevorkian Seminary: the construction was launched on July 11, 2009 and the centre was officially opened on November 5, 2011. The three-storied building located near the Gevorkian Seminary, was designed by architect Jim Torosyan, while the construction was funded by Bedros and Anna Oruncakciel from Los Angeles.
- Pontifical Events Centre: located at the western edge of the Mother See complex, near the Veharan pontifical residence, designated to host conferences, as well as the religious and secular events of the Mother See. The two-storied building opened in 2014, was designed by architect Hrach Poghosyan and the construction was funded by Samvel Karapetyan.
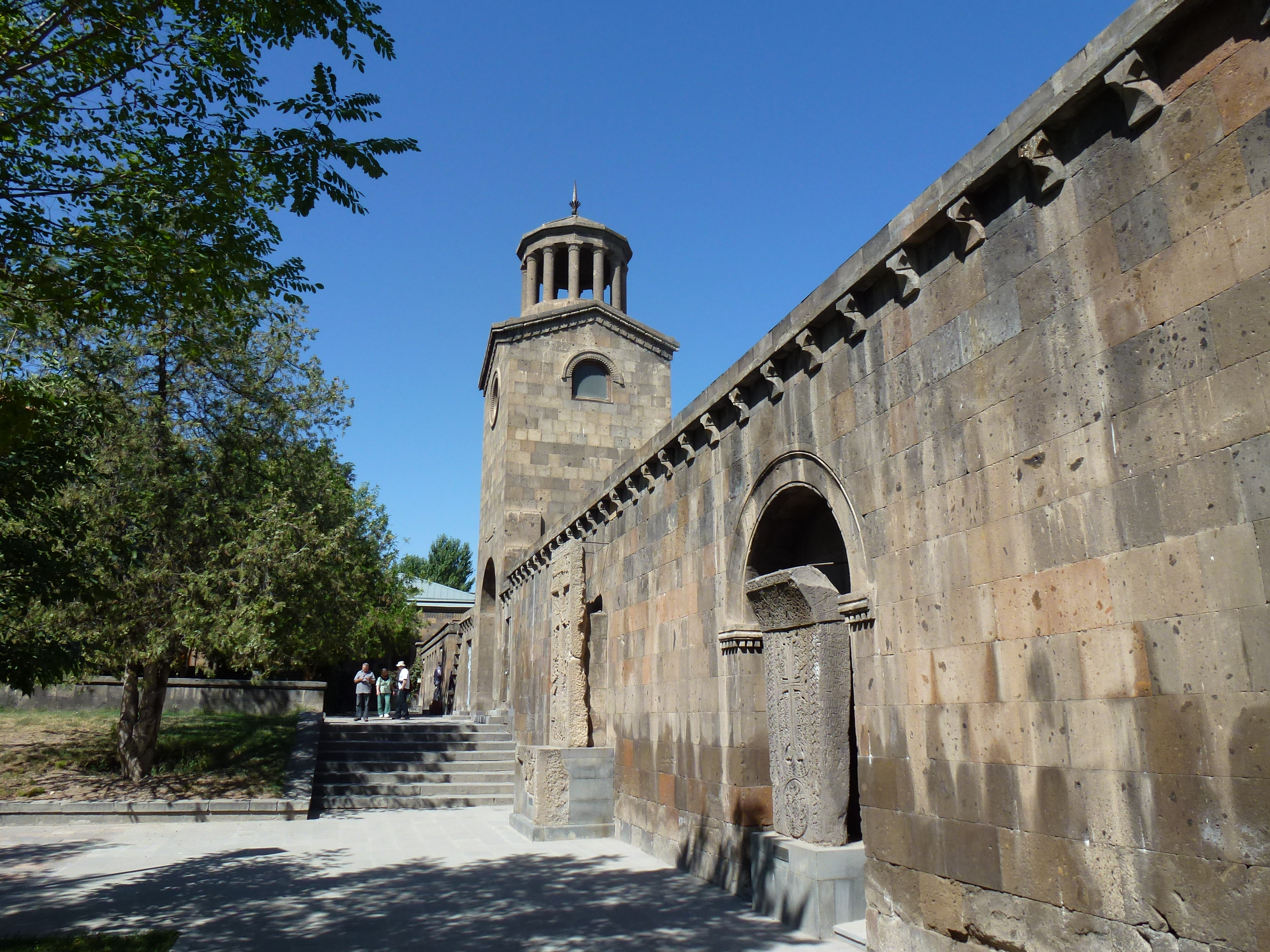
Northern wall of the Mother See

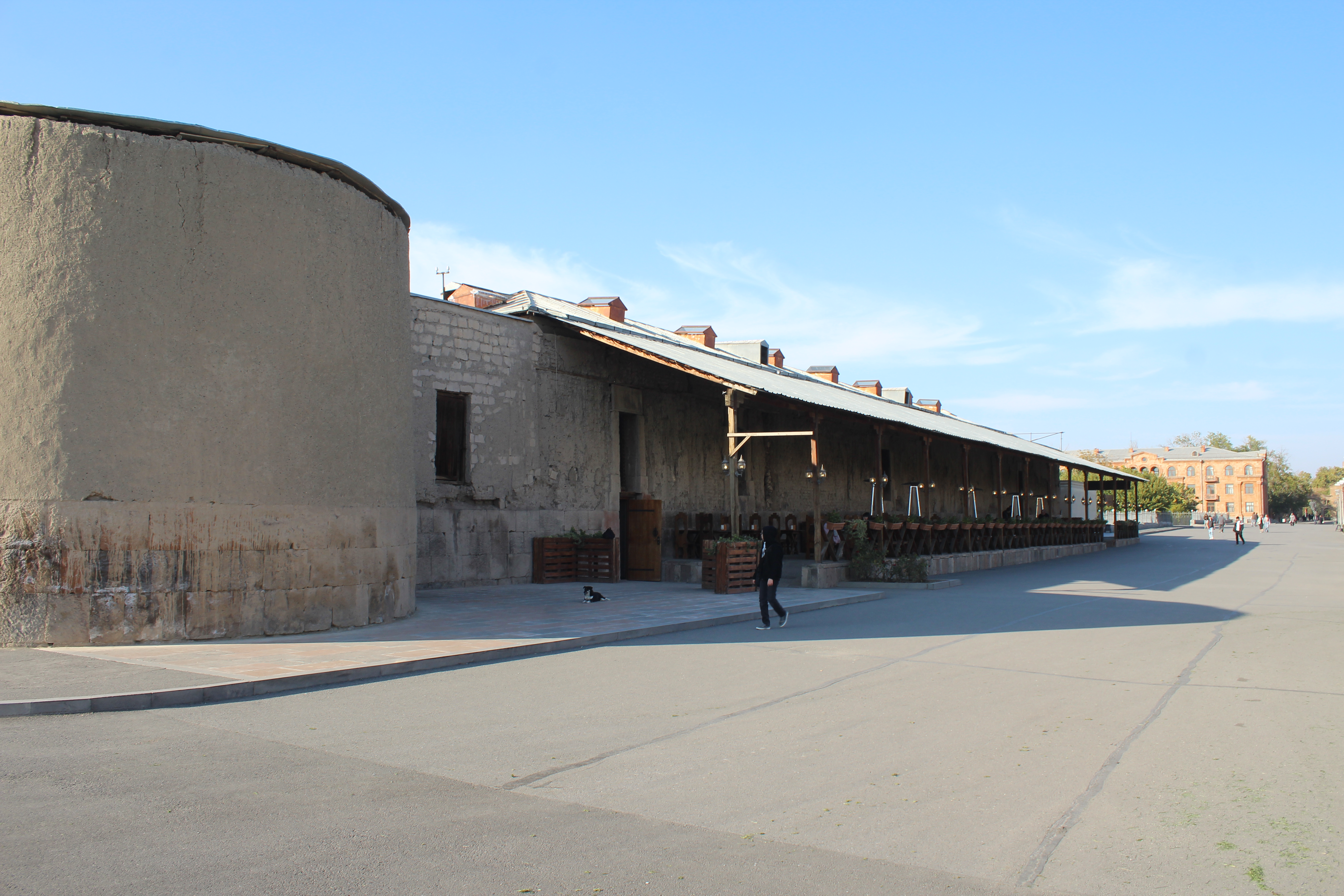
Refectory

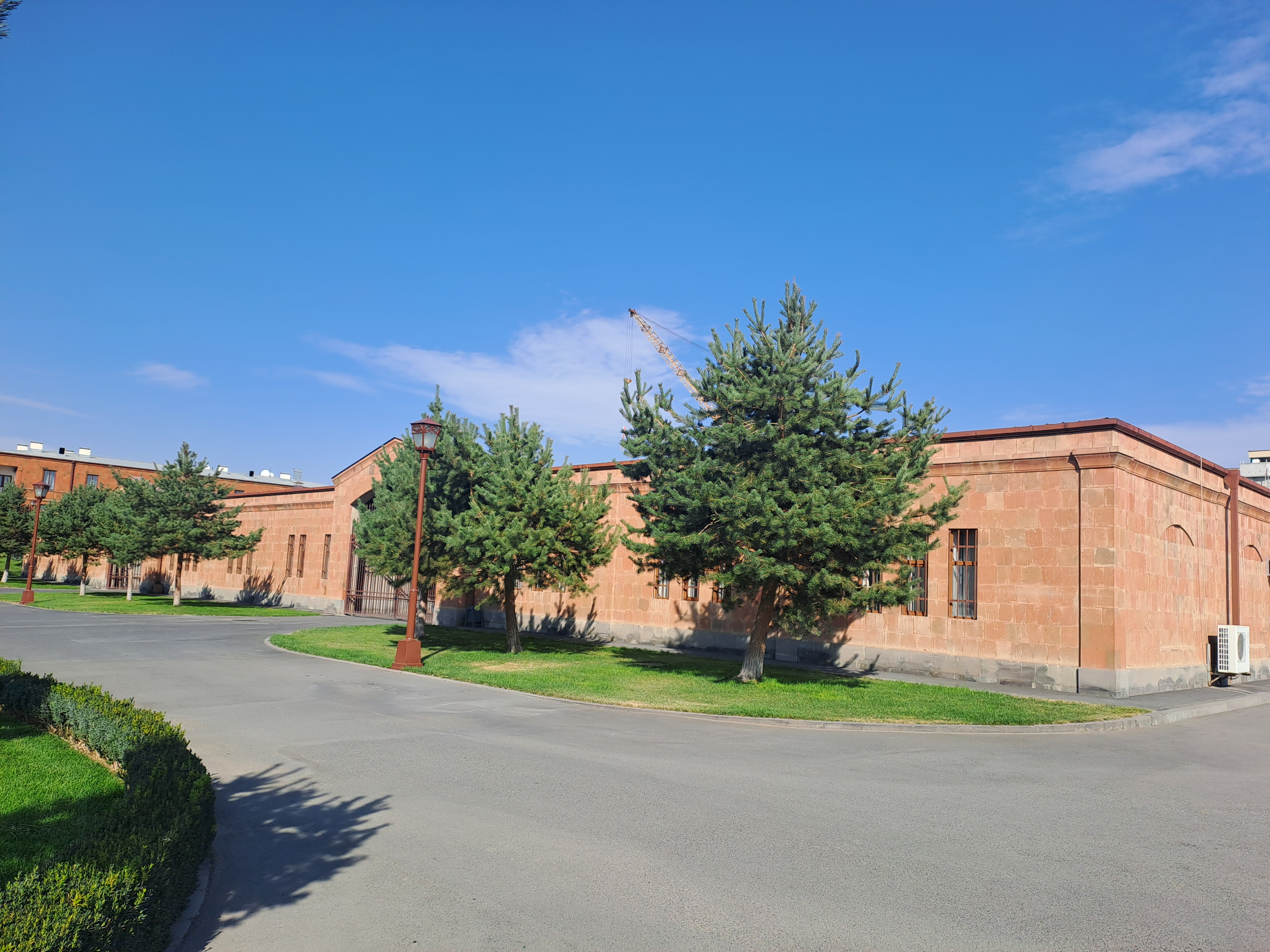
Storage and Service Facility

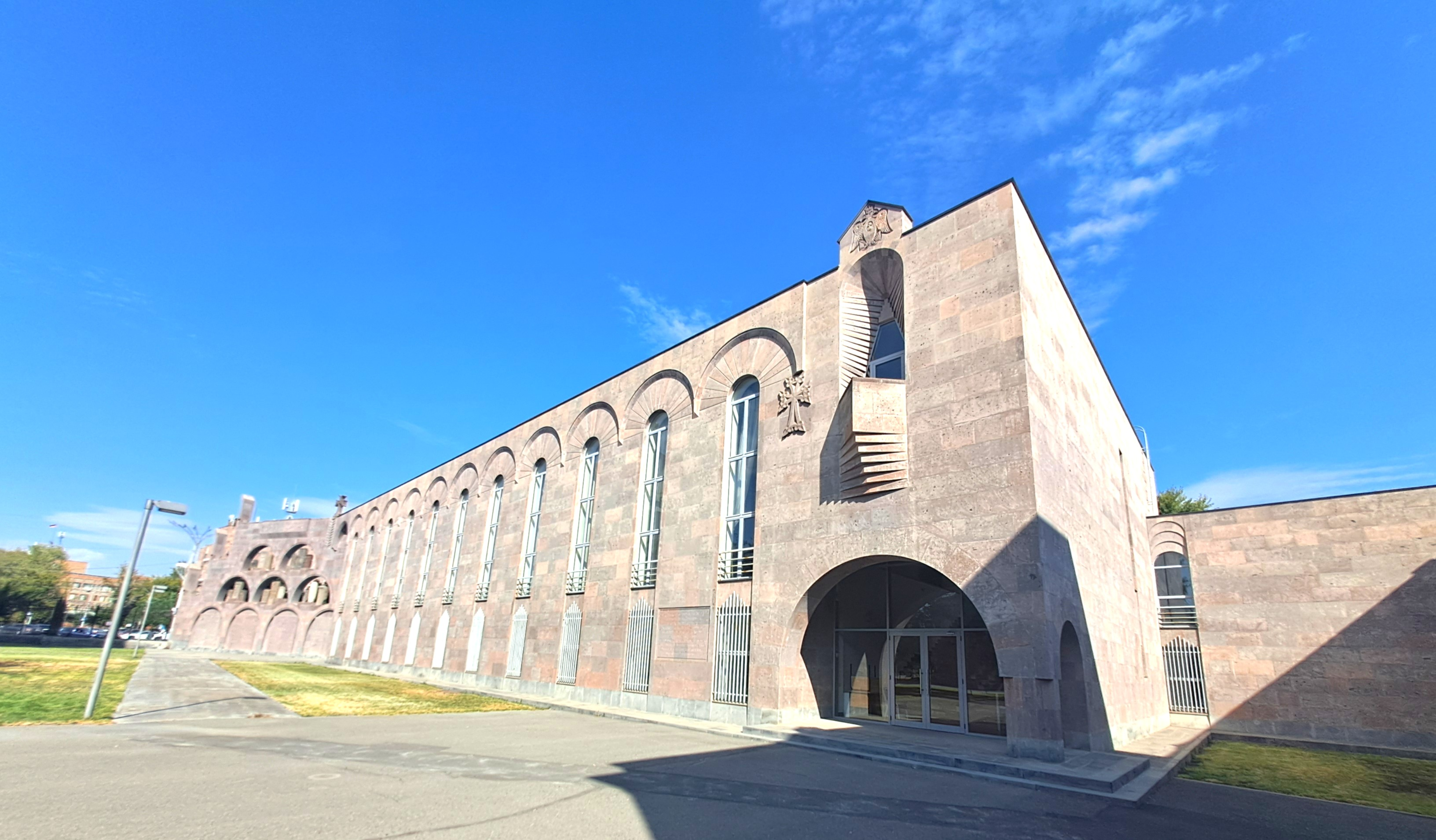
Sports and events centre of Gevorkian Seminary

== Gallery ==
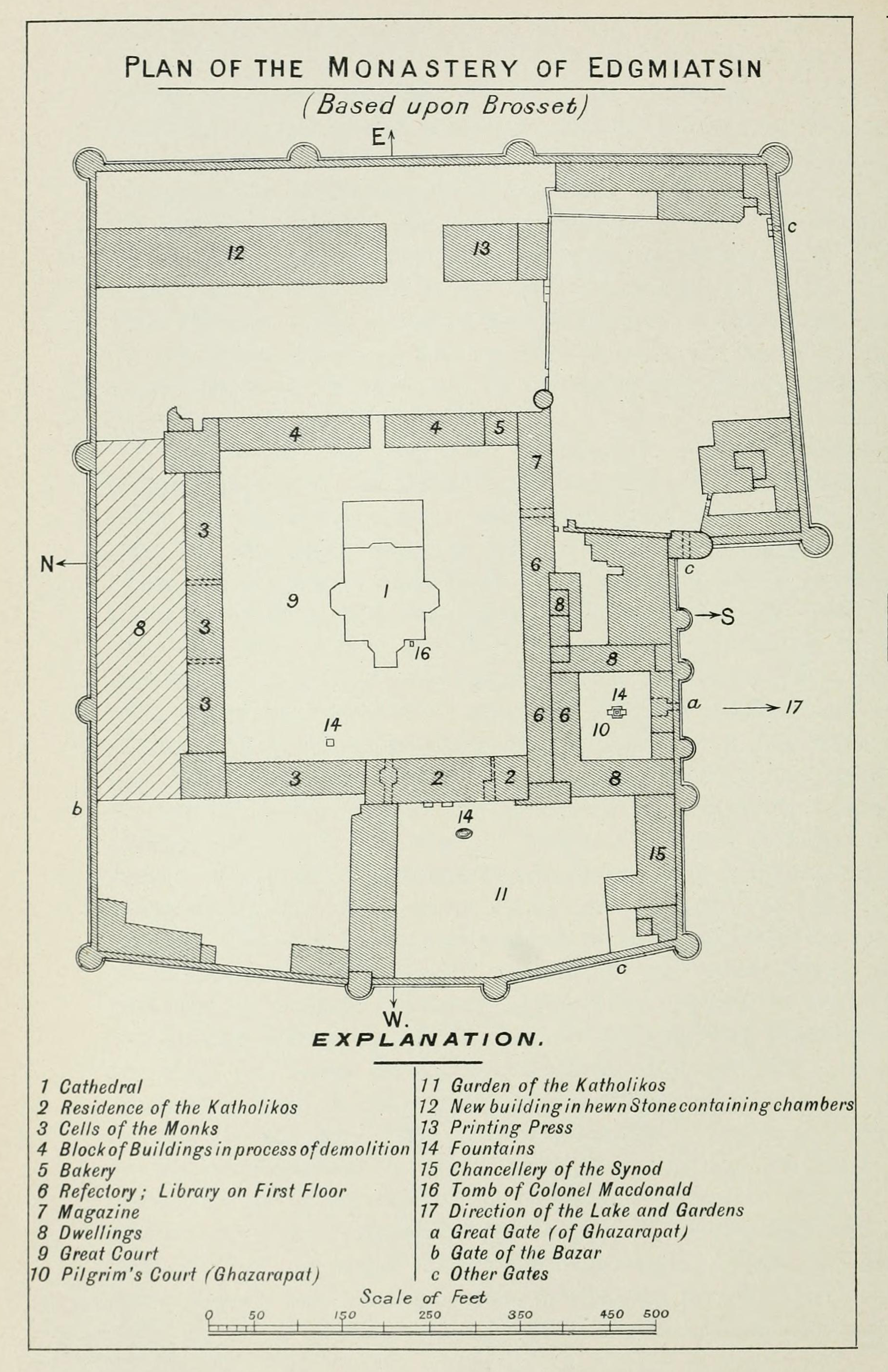
The plan of the cathedral and surrounding by H. F. B. Lynch, as of 1901

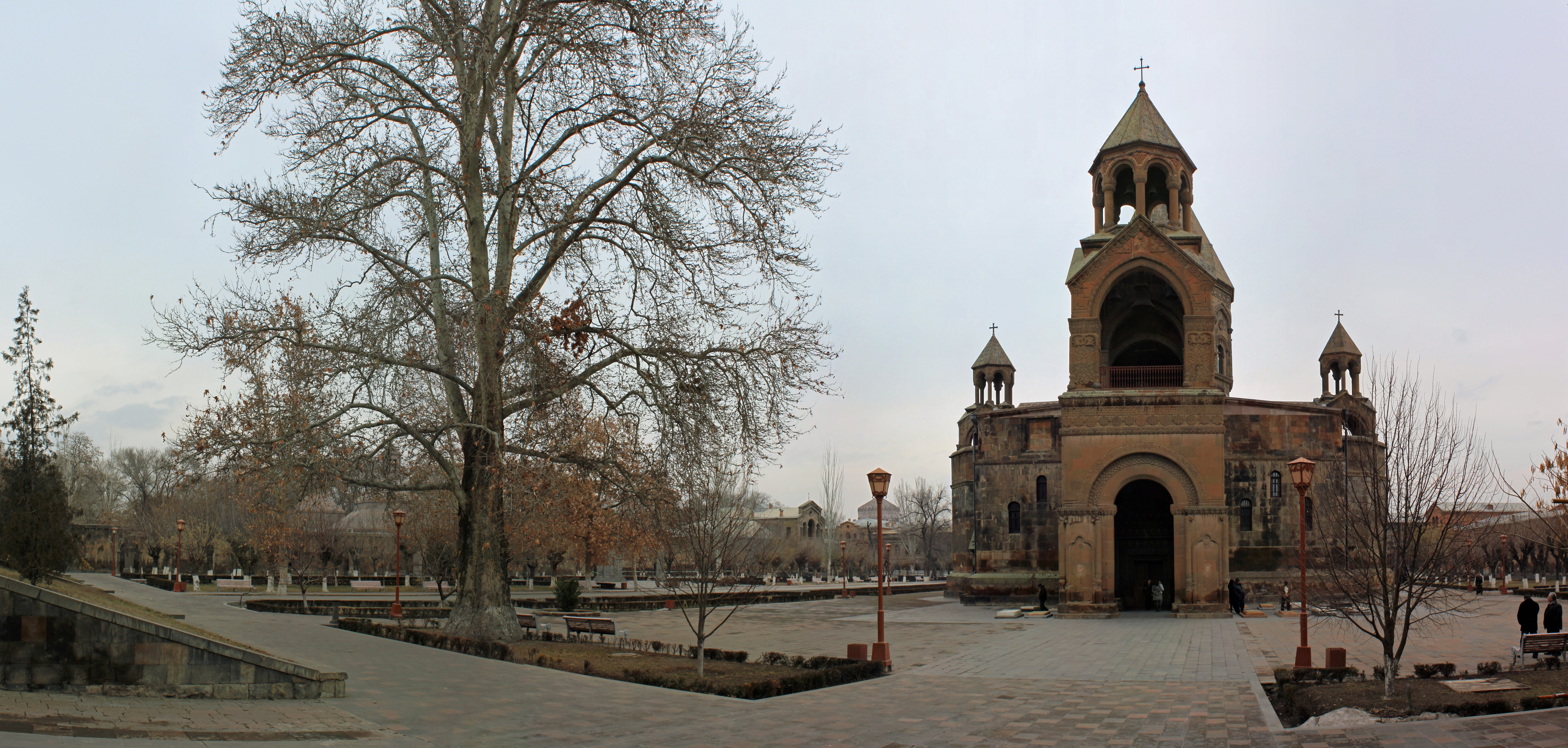
The Mother Cathedral at the Mother See

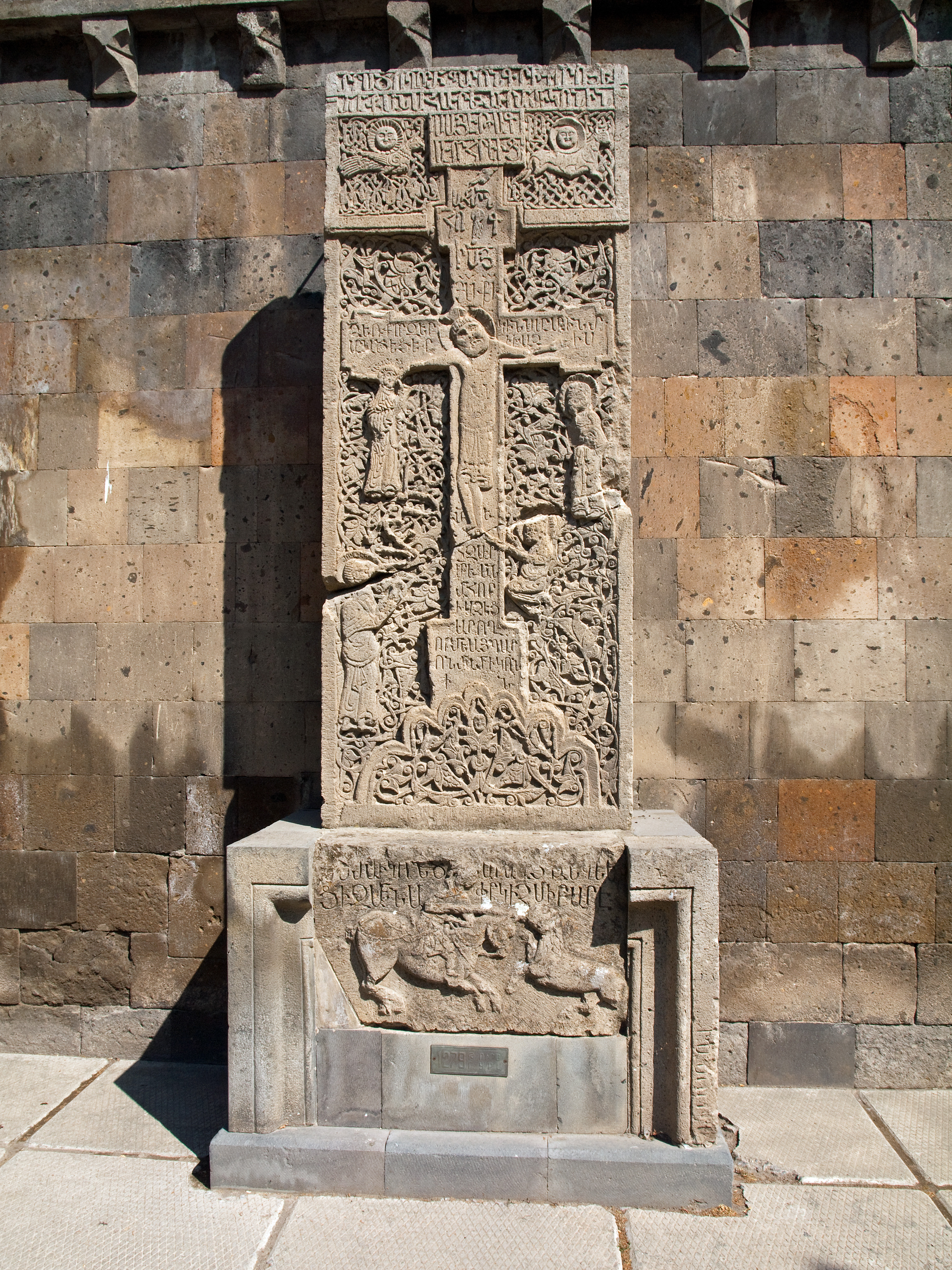
Amenaprkich Khachkar of 1279 from Vayots Dzor

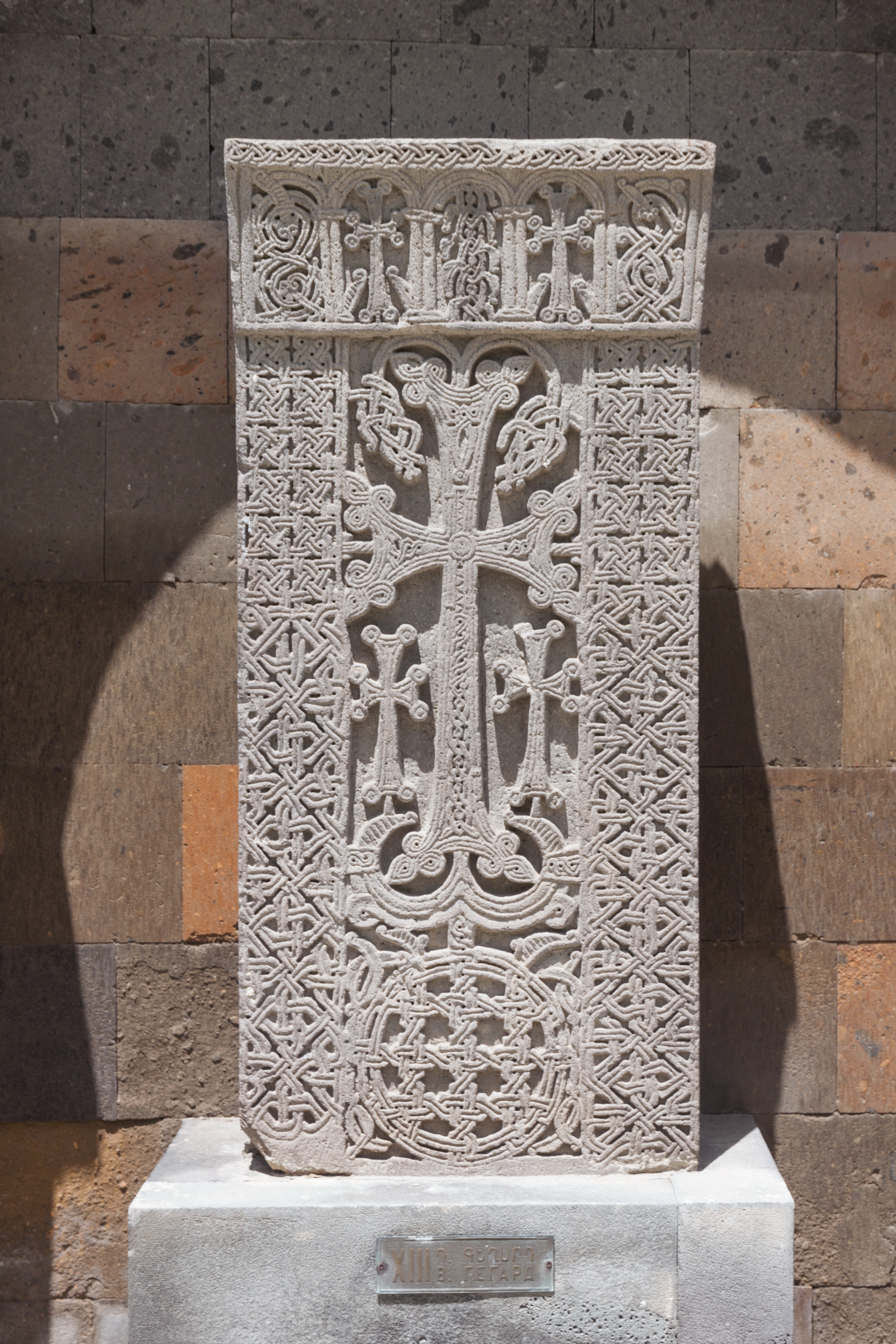
A 13th-century khachkar from Geghard

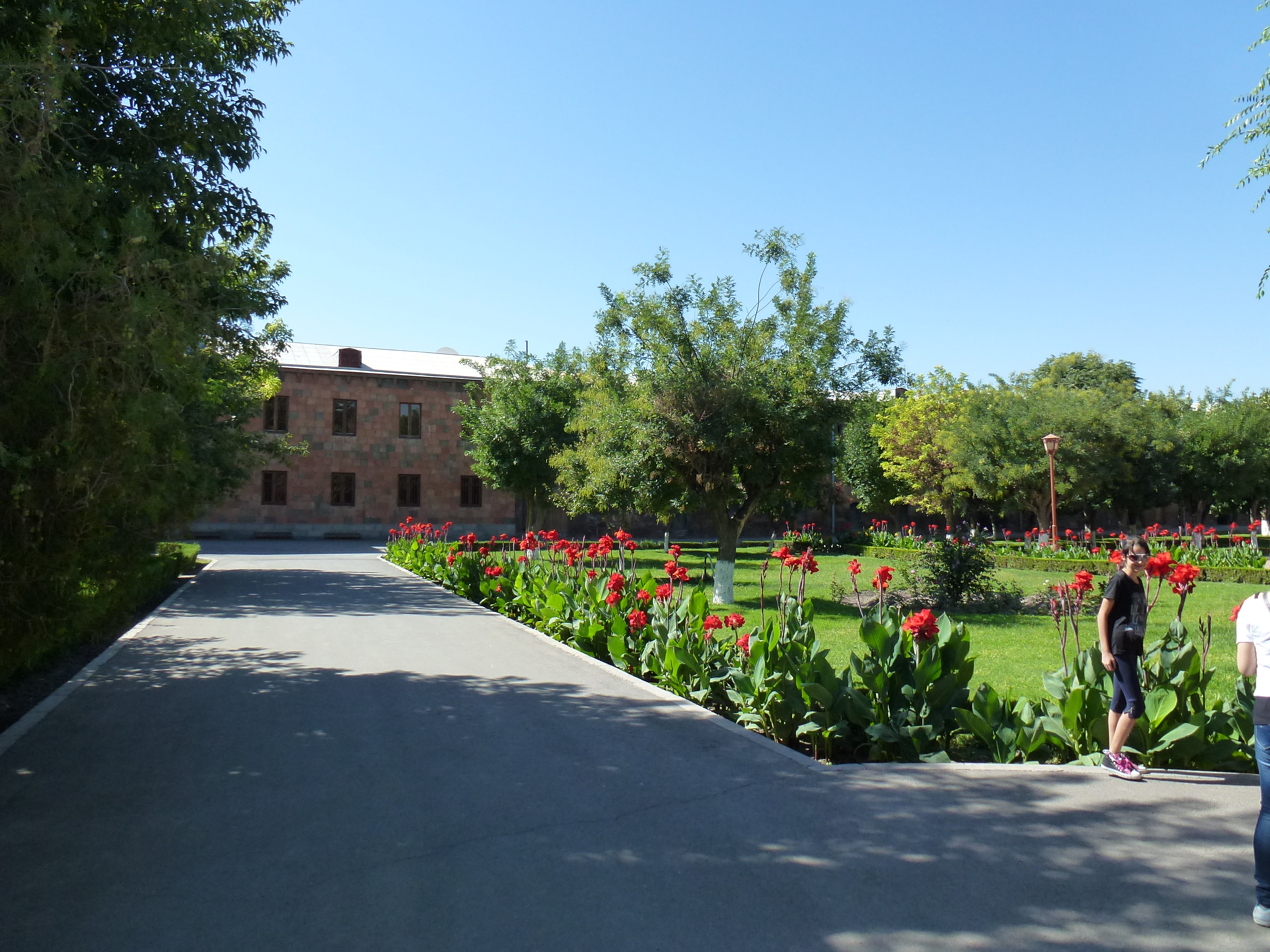
Park within the Mother See complex

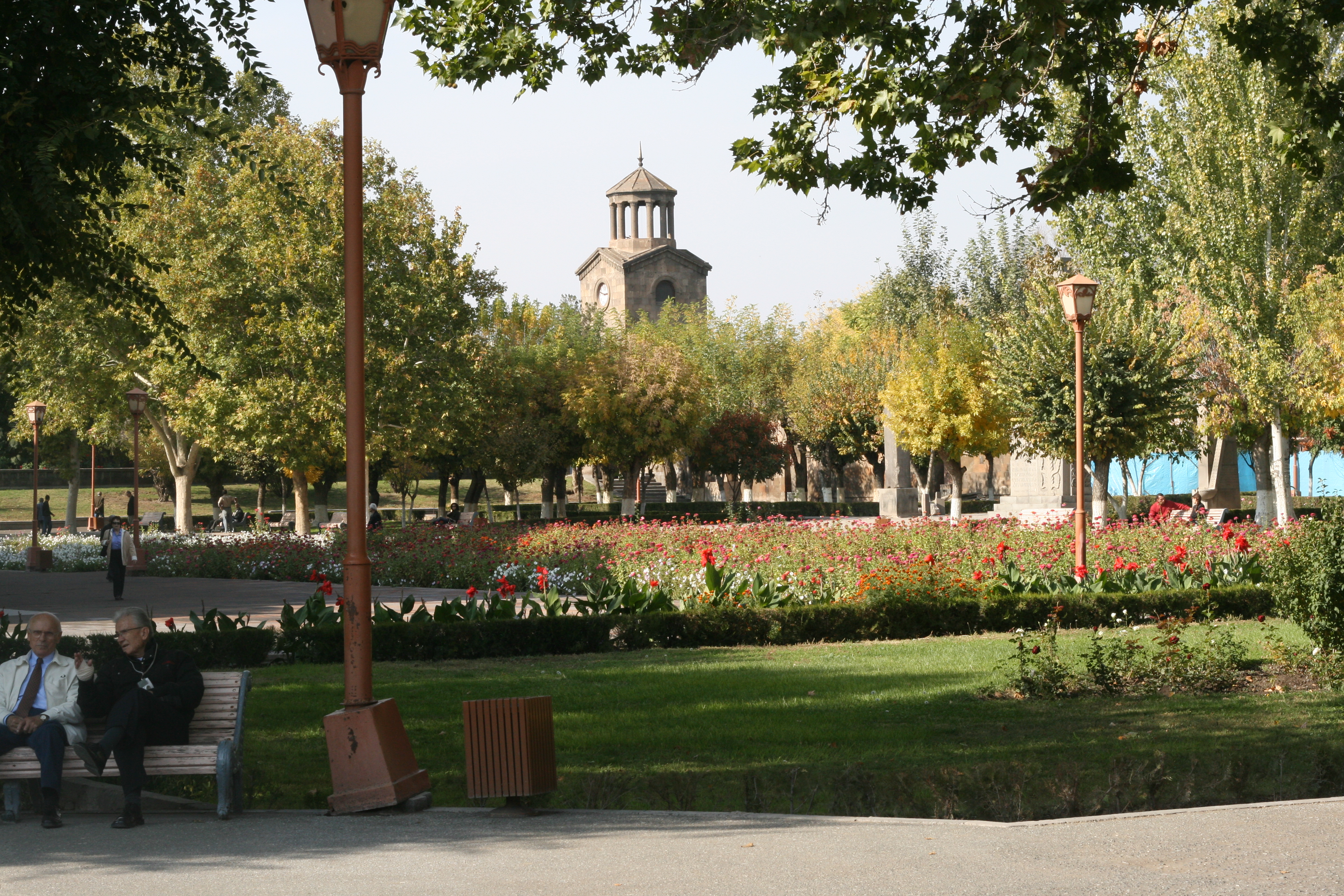
The view around the Mother Cathedral

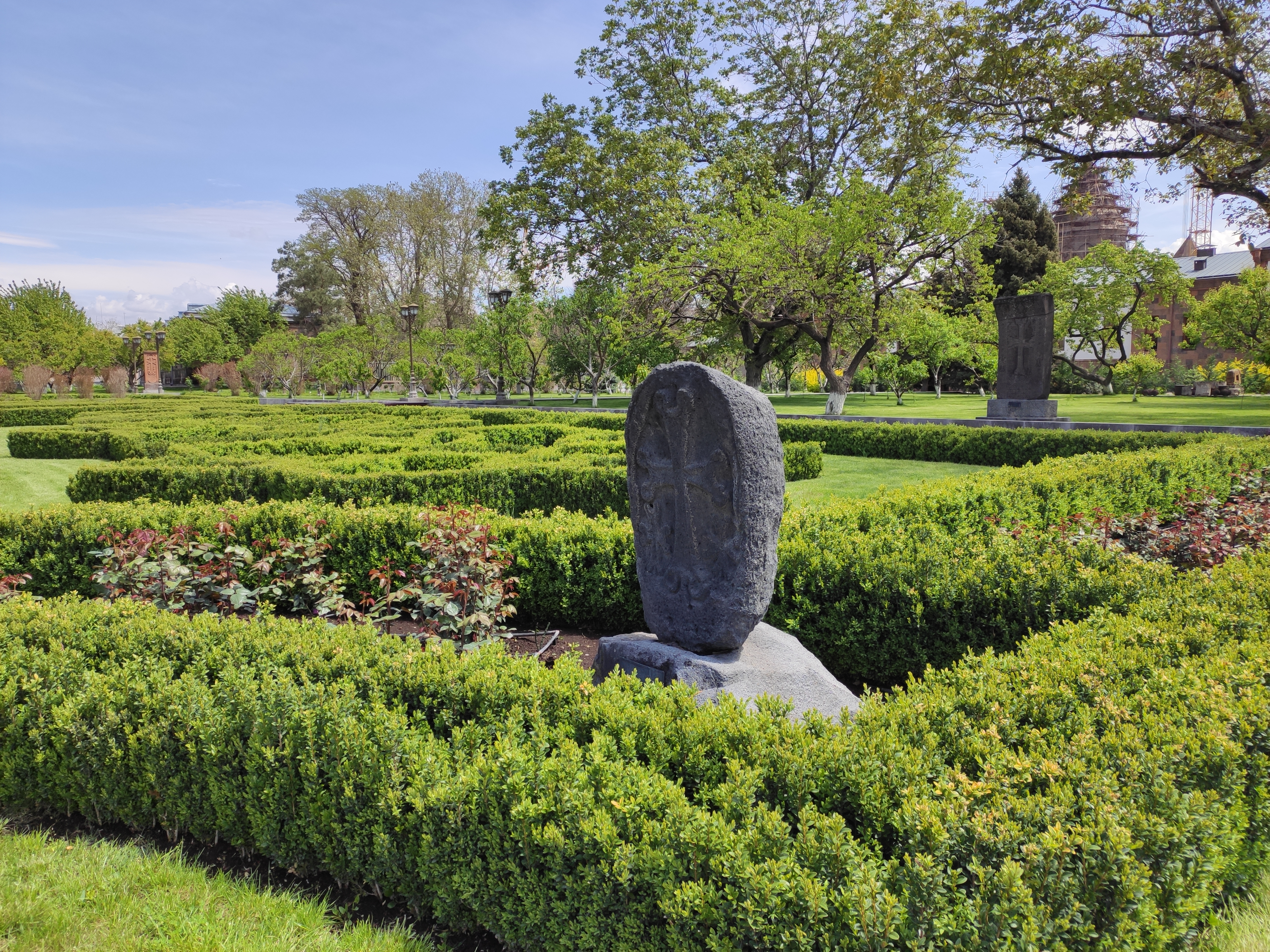
Gardens of the Mother See near the Veharan

== See also ==
- Etchmiadzin Cathedral
- List of catholicoi of Armenia
- Holy See of Cilicia
- Armenian Patriarchate of Constantinople
- Armenian Patriarchate of Jerusalem

== Sources ==
- Stopka, Krzysztof (2016). Armenia Christiana: Armenian Religious Identity and the Churches of Constantinople and Rome (4th-15th century). Kraków: Jagiellonian University Press. ISBN 9788323395553.
