= Etchmiadzin Paper Factory =

- Company type: Public
- Industry: Paper
- Founded: 1780s
- Founder: Catholicos Simeon I of Yerevan
- Headquarters: Etchmiadzin, Armenia
- Area served: Armenia, Russia, Constantinople

The Etchmiadzin Paper Factory was built in 1775 by Catholicos Simeon I of Yerevan in Etchmiadzin. The factory operated for approximately six years, but shut down after his death in 1780. It was rebuilt three times before being officially demolished, twice after the invasions of Mamad Khan at the end of the 18th century and the beginning of the 19th century. The factory is finally shut when a Russo-Persian war destroyed it, after which Armenia never had a paper-producing factory.

== History ==
In August 1770, a printing press was constructed in the city of Etchmiadzin for the publications of religious literature. The press was in operation for a few years, but it soon stopped due to a paper shortage. At the time, the papers were imported from Western and Central Europe, which were not sufficient to fulfill the needs of the press. They were too costly, too bulky, and far too unreliable. The leader of the majority Armenian faith, Simeon Erevantsi, decided to build a paper factory in the area. Erevantsi traveled to Constantinople, India, and Persia to bring expert paper-makers to Etchmiadzin to work in the factory; however, he wasn't able to find experts for three years. He traveled to Paris as a last-ditch effort, where he found two talented paper-makers, Monsieur Beysiaunie and Monsieur Dessiaurie. On January 4, 1776, the first paper was produced in Etchmiadzin Paper Factory, even though the production had started in March 1775. The quality of the paper, however, was very poor. Disappointed with the low-quality paper production, Erevantsi demanded to be made again. After several attempts, the Parisians prepared a new sieve that produced a higher quality of papers.

On June 28, 1775, experts from Persia who had heard of this paper production business arrived at Etchmiadzin and built a new paper factory in a very short span of time. The Persian experts also taught two students, Nigoghayos and Markar, the skills of producing the paper that could have been higher in quality than the paper produced by their Parisian counterparts. By April 16, 1776, the Persian paper experts wound up their work and went back home, leaving the students to continue their factory. Thus, within a year (1775-1776), two paper factories were built in the city of Etchmiadzin, one by French Papermasters and the other by Persian Papermasters. The French Papermaster's factory was 2240m long and 1008m wide. The dimensions of the Persian factory are however unknown. The expenses for the construction of these factories were covered by Krikor Agha of Tchakig. The factory built by the Persian experts was later directed by Nigoghayos, a student of the Persian Papermasters who also learned from the Frenchmen.

== Construction expenses ==
The cost of constructing and furnishing the two factories in Etchmiadzin summed up to approximately 18,000 Ghroush (Turkish currency unit). This approximated cost excludes the cost of payments to the experts and laborers and the cost of food given to them. The construction project required daily work from 1235 quarrymen (20-25 para (Note: 40 paras make 1 ghroush։) paid to each), 279 masons (12-15 para each), 176 smiths (25 para each), 4217 tillers (6 para each), and 318 unskilled laborers (15 para each).

== Instruments used in the Factory ==
The tools used in the paper factory were made of wood, stone, and iron or iron alloys such as steel. The most important wooden tool was the presser or ‘manguiana’, which was similar to pressing racks used for oil-pressing in Armenia. Each was made up of two or four beams of 12-15 meters in length. Other instruments used were the ‘bourghou’ and the ‘gakhkar’ etc. Manguiana was used to press the paper. Mortars and pestles were made to mince and chop the paper into smaller bits, resulting in a smoother and more uniform sheet. Channels and buckets made of stone were used to move the pulp from one place to another. Special water mills were made to mince the pulp. Many different sizes of pallets, faucets, mixers, and other tools in constant contact with the pulp were made of copper due to its natural anti-adhesive properties. The sieves were used in high-quality paper production to strain even the smallest imperfections out of the pulp. Small tools, essential for carrying out precise measurements, were bought by the French experts.

== Materials ==
The main material used for the production of paper was canvas palace. To get canvas, Simeon Erevantsi asked experts from Bayazed, Kars, Karin, and also from vartabed Hovsep Arghoutian of Astrakhan to send him some. The experts from Astrakhan were able to collect the palaces from Russian cities and sent them to Etchmiadzin. Other than the canvas, cotton, hemp, and linseed stem, they were also used for raw material. Alkali, torton, borax, alum, and glue were used as binding agents. All these substances were imported from Turkey.

== Use of paper ==
The paper produced in the Etchmiadzin Paper Factory was mostly used locally in religious books. Some samples of the paper were also sent to Heraguel king of Georgia, Armenian Church prelates of Constantinople and Russia, and others. The local use of the paper was mainly for the publishing house where some of the prominent writings like "The Solvent" of Simeon Catholicos have been written. The paper produced in the factory was also used for secretaryship.

The paper was coarse and produced light hay or gray colors. On one side it bore a watermark by the monogram of "St. Etchmiadzin". Beneath the watermark were Simeon Catholicos' initials. The next page bore the words "թուին ՌՄԻԷ (1776)” along with the initials of Krikor Mikaelian (Tchakikian) as he financed the construction of the factory and publishing house. Tchakikian's name was also mentioned on the frontispieces of the published books.

== Other attempts at construction ==
Etchmiadzin's factory operated for 5 years until the death of Simeon Catholicos. Attempts to build a new factory ended in failure. In 1837 Bishop Sahag sent editors to the synod of Etchmiadzin in order to build a factory that produced paper, drawing pencils, and other materials. The bishop's factory construction petition was rejected in Synod's session of March 1, 1837.
