= Karekin I Centre of Theology and Armenology =

Coordinates: 40°09′36″N 44°17′26″E

Karekin I Centre of Theology and Armenology (Armenian: Գարեգին Ա Աստվածաբանական-հայագիտական կենտրոն, Garegin A Astvatsabanakan-hayagitakan kentron), is an educational institution and a research centre of the Mother See of Holy Etchmiadzin, located in Vagharshapat, Armenia. It was officially founded on 26 June 2000, by Catholicos Karekin II.

Named after Catholicos Karekin I of All Armenians, the centre is located within the complex of the Mother See.

Its goal is to promote the development of theological studies and Christian education, medieval Armenian literature studies, teaching the Armenian language in foreign countries, manuscript studies, documentation and archiving skills, etc.

The director of the center is Bishop Vahan Hovhanessian. The center's business operations and assists management in the Gevorkian Theological Seminary seminarians, as well as clergymen.

The centers is in coordination with a number of institutions, including the Armenian National Academy of Sciences, Gevorkian Theological Seminary, the National Library of Armenia and the Faculty of History and Theology of Yerevan State University.

On 28 September 2015, the new building of the centre was opened in the complex of the Mother See of Holy Etchmiadzin. The new premises were built through the donations of Haig and Elza Didizian.
