= Shoghakat Church =

Cultural heritage monument of Armenia

- Շողակաթ եկեղեցի
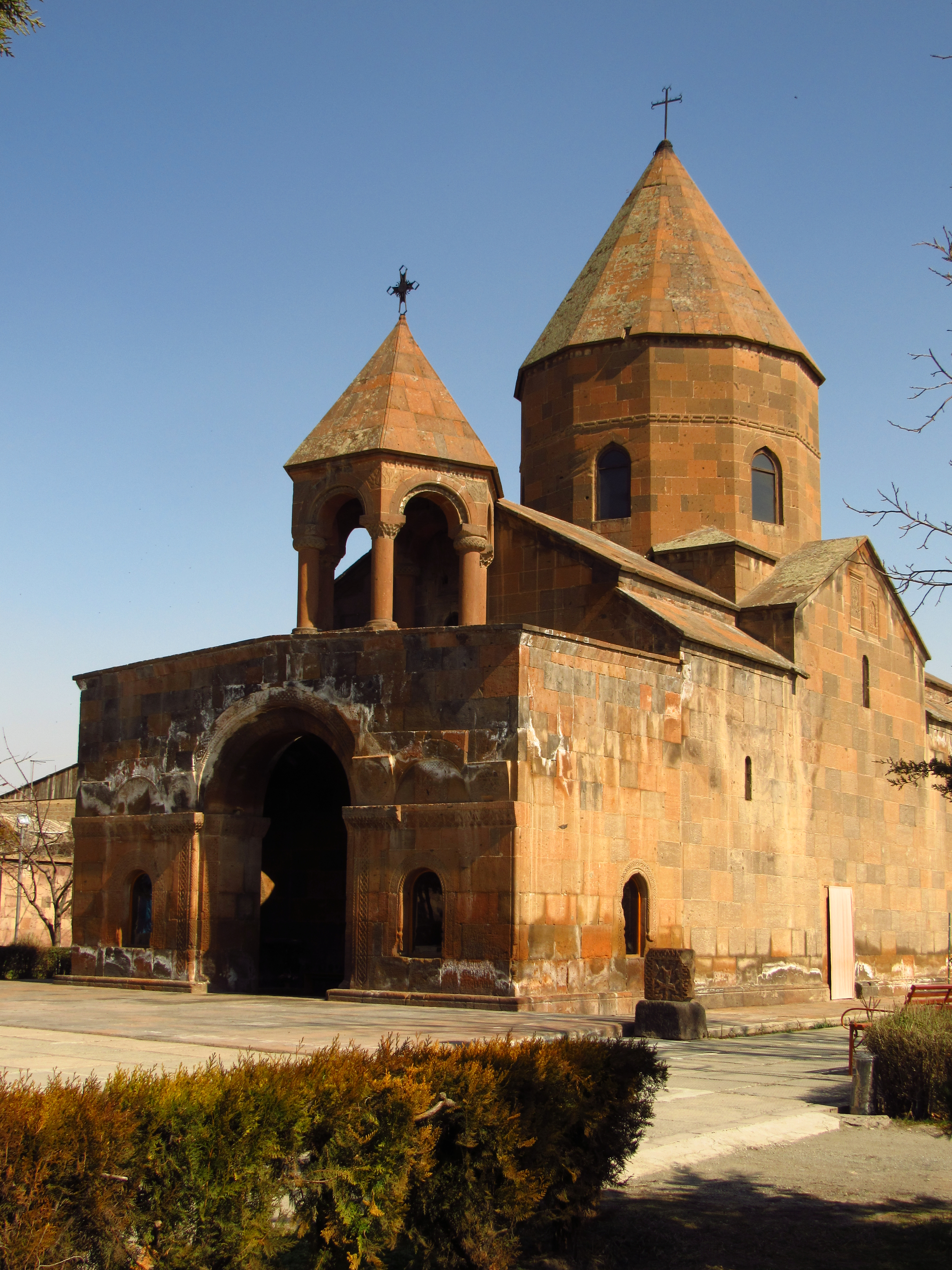
- Shoghakat Church, 2021

- Location within Armenia

Religion
- Affiliation: Armenian Apostolic Church

Location
- Location: Vagharshapat, Armavir Province, Armenia
- Coordinates: 40.168044°N 44.304936°E

Architecture
- Type: Domed single nave basilica
- Style: Armenian
- Completed: 1694
- Dome: 1
- UNESCO World Heritage Site
- Official name: Cathedral and Churches of Echmiatsin and the Archaeological Site of Zvartnots
- Type: Cultural
- Criteria: (ii) (iii)
- Designated: 2000 (24th session)
- Reference no.: 1011-005
- Region: Western Asia

The Church of Shoghakat (Armenian: Շողակաթ եկեղեցի; meaning "drop of light" because of the ray of light that came down from heaven upon Hripsime's martyrs) was erected in 1694 by Prince Aghamal Sorotetsi during the reign of Catholicos Nahabed I in the city of Vagharshapat (Etchmiadzin), in Armenia's Armavir Province.

== History ==
The church sits on the holy site where a group of unnamed nuns following Gayane and Hripsime were martyred during the time of the conversion of Armenia to Christianity in the year 301 AD. The 5th-century Armenian historian Agathangelos wrote that the young and beautiful Hripsime who at the time was a Christian nun in Rome, was to be forcefully married to the Roman emperor Diocletian. She and the abbess Gayane among other nuns fled the tyrant emperor and left to Armenia. The pagan Armenian King Trdat received a letter from Diocletian in which he described her beauty. Trdat discovered where the nuns were hiding, and fell in love with Hripsime and later Gayane. After their refusal of his advances, Hripsime and Gayane were tortured and martyred separately at the locations of the churches of their names. The remaining thirty-eight nuns were martyred at the location of Shoghakat. The name of the church refers to the ray of light that appeared during the martyrdom of the nuns. During the time that Hripsime was being tortured, Gayane had told her to "be of good cheer, and stand firm" in her faith. King Trdat was to be later converted to Christianity and made it the official religion of the kingdom.

== Architecture ==
=== Earlier structures ===
At the site of the present day church of Shoghakat, there stood an earlier church of the 6th or 7th century which has not survived. It is believed that the structure standing at the site today possibly rests on the foundations of the earlier church (other sources say that Shoghakat may have been built upon the foundations of a 13th-century church). At the southwest end of the building, excavations uncovered the remains of a single-chamber church constructed on a stepped platform, thought to have been a 4th-century memorial chapel. At the southern wall is a small semi-circular apse believed to have served as a southern portico. The bases of the wall piers have features that are characteristic to 4th- and 5th-century Armenian churches. Two portals that led into the chapel were located as well, one to the south and one to the west.

=== Shoghakat Church ===
Shoghakat is a domed single-nave basilica with a semi-circular eastern apse flanked on either side by narrow chapels. Some portions of the apse wall could possibly date to the 5th century. Four pendentives help make the transition from the square central bay to the octagonal drum and conical dome above. As in some of the other medieval Armenian churches, the drum and dome are situated off-center and to the west. The main portal into the church leads into the interior from an open gallery adjacent to the western wall of the structure. A lengthy inscription is on the exterior lintel above the door, and is offset by the orangish color of the tufa used. Another smaller portal is at the southern wall. Very little ornamentation adorns the main body of the church except for a geometric pattern that is around the mid-portion of the exterior of the drum, some khachkars built into the upper walls, and a geometric cross design at the exterior of the eastern wall with rosettes and two small cross shaped windows that let some light into the apse of the church.

At the western end of the structure is a vaulted open gallery constructed simultaneously with the church. A single large arched opening centered in the middle of the front façade leads into the gallery, where directly across from it is the main portal to the church. Open arched windows are located to either side of the arch on the western wall as well as the walls north and south. The frames surrounding the windows and the large arched entry are highly ornamented with geometric patterns, rosettes, and khachkars. Centered above the gallery is a cupola supported by six-columns that serves as the church's belfry. Foliage patterns adorn each of the six upper exterior of corners of the cupola.

== Gallery ==
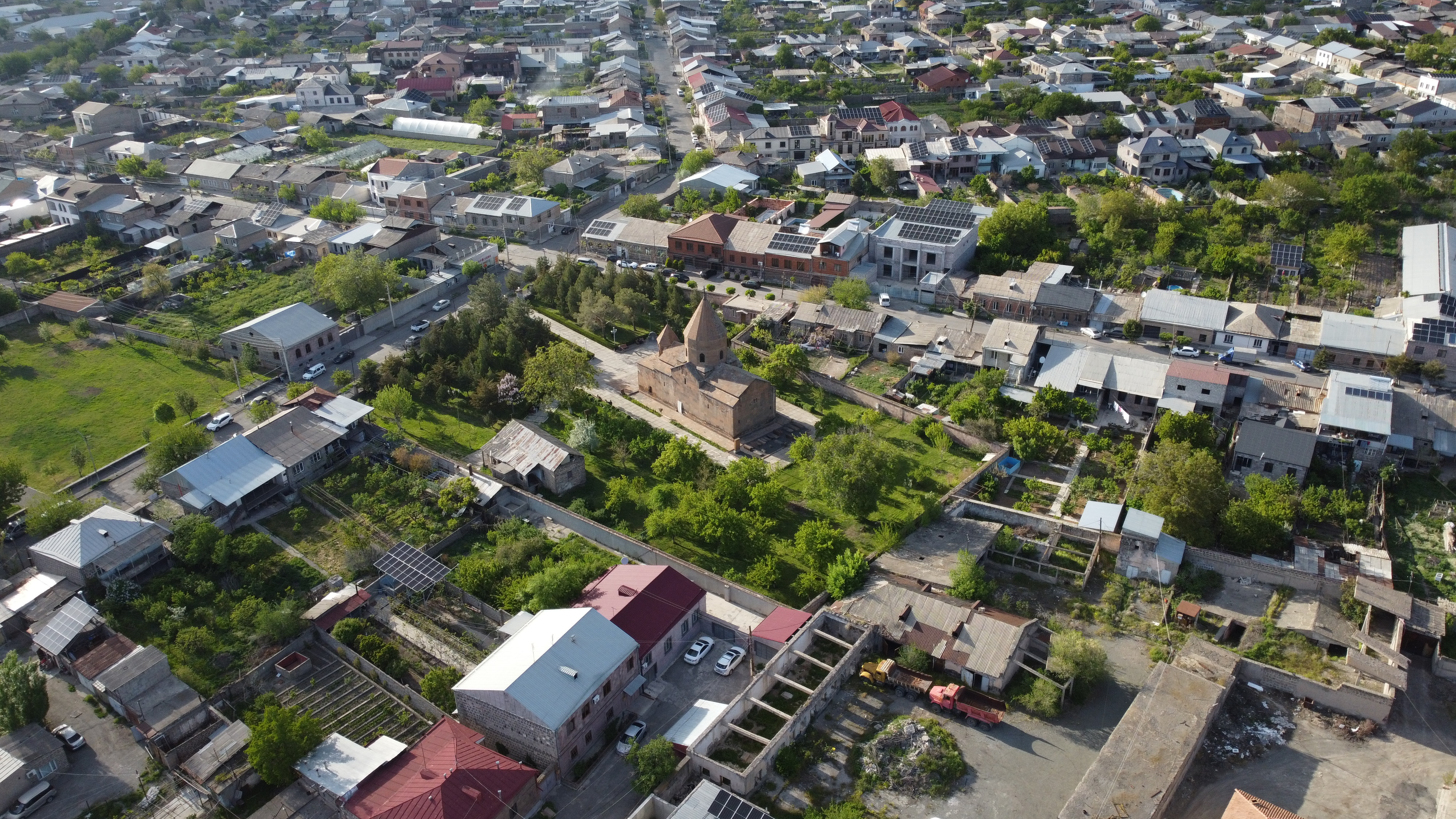
An aerial view of church grounds

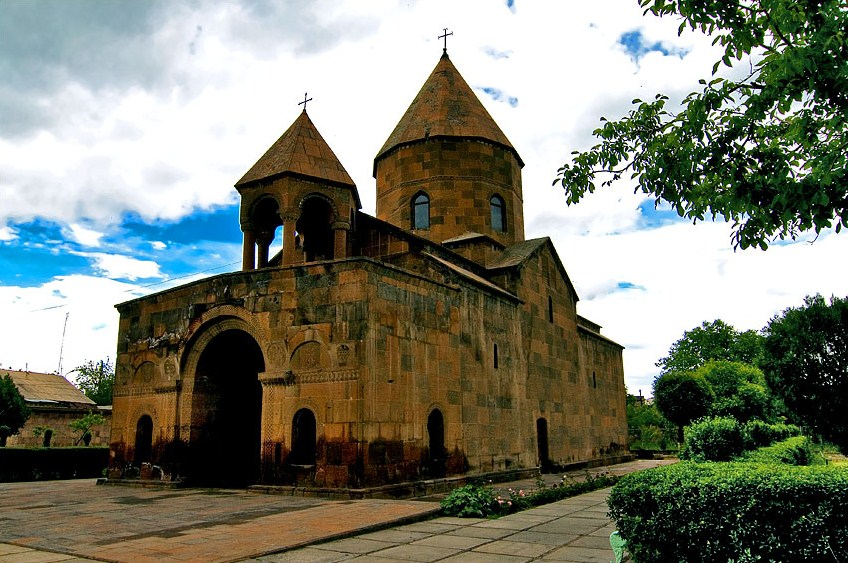
Shoghakat Church, May 2008.

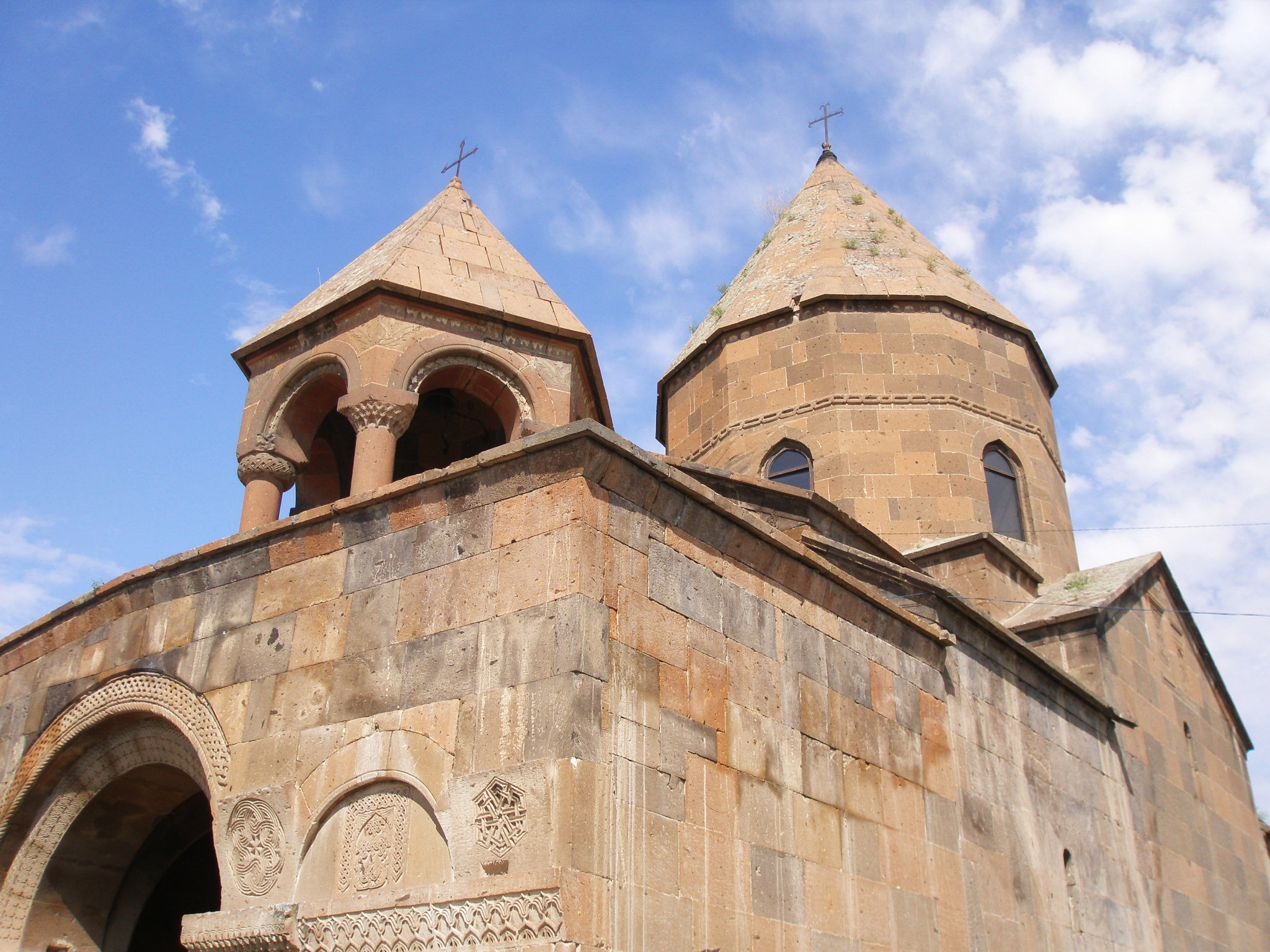
The drum, dome, and belfry of the church.

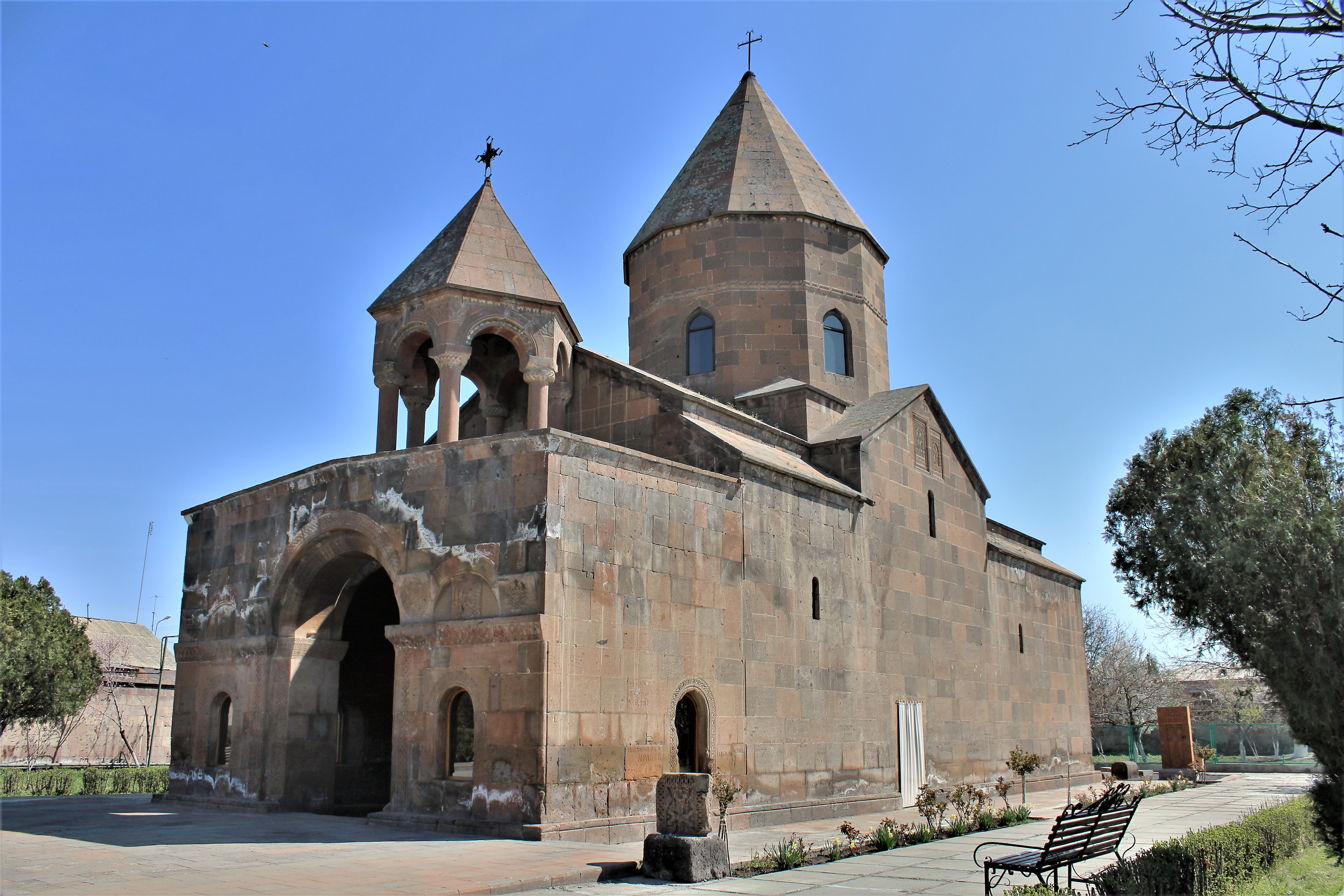

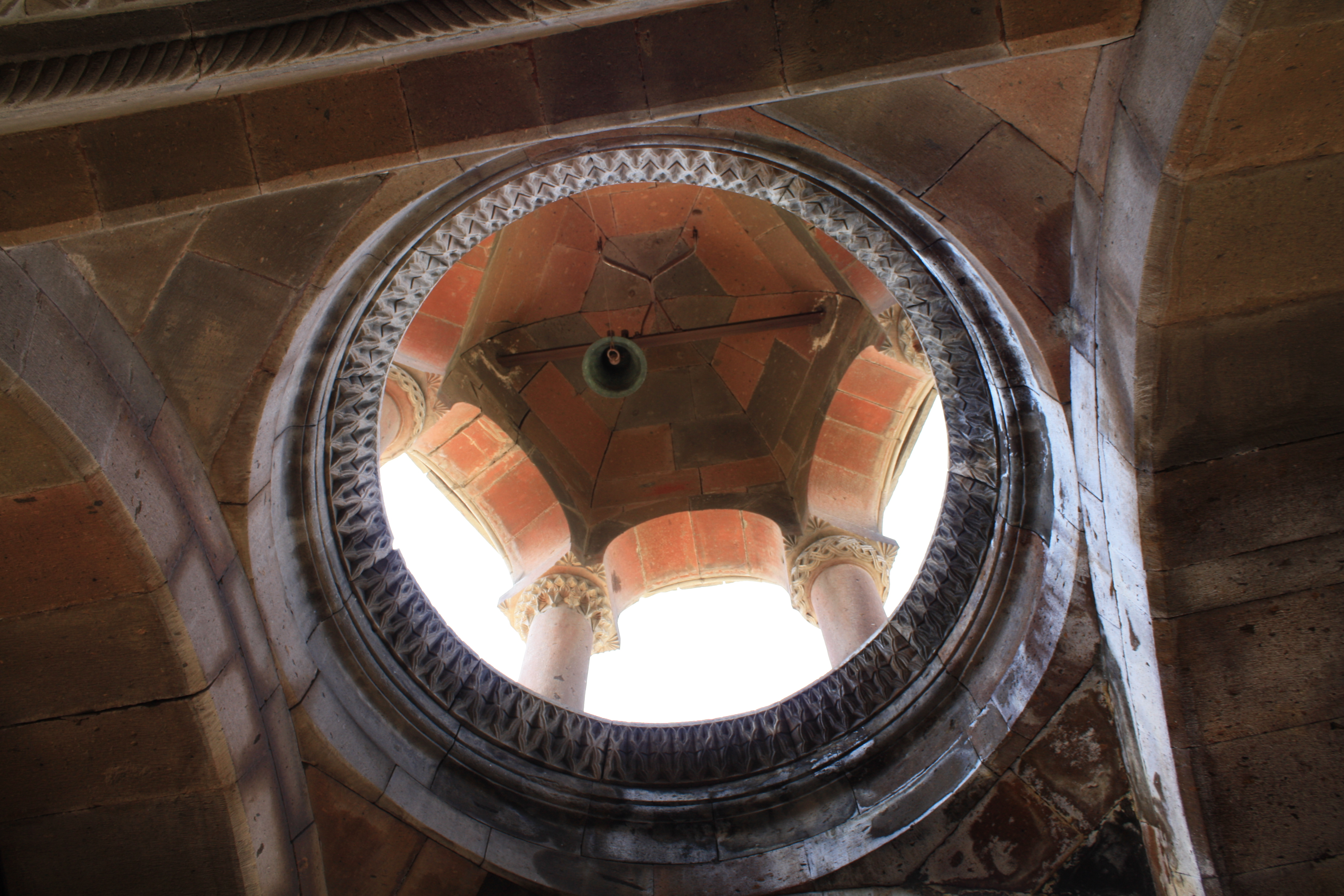
View of the belfry interior

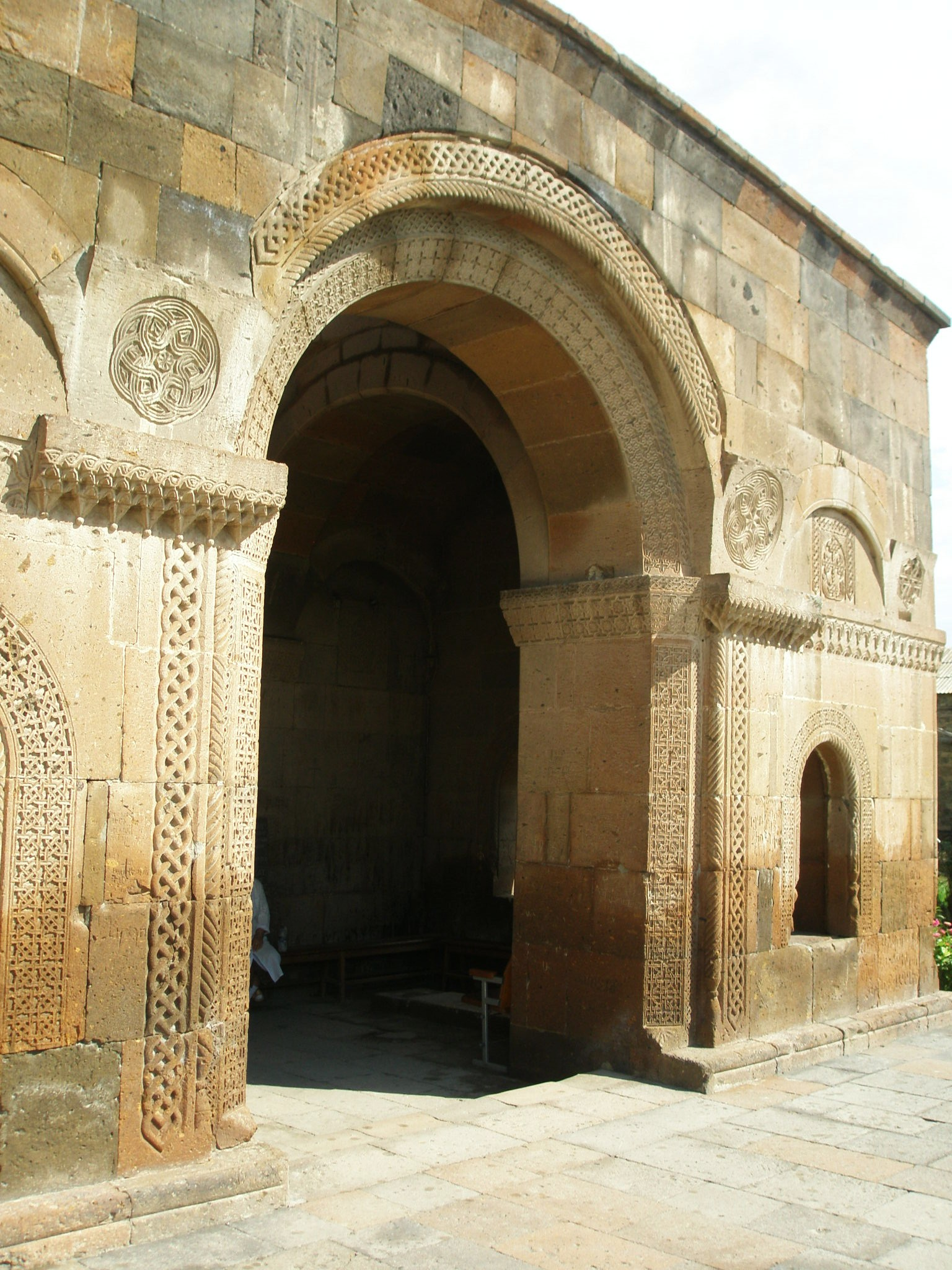
Covered portico

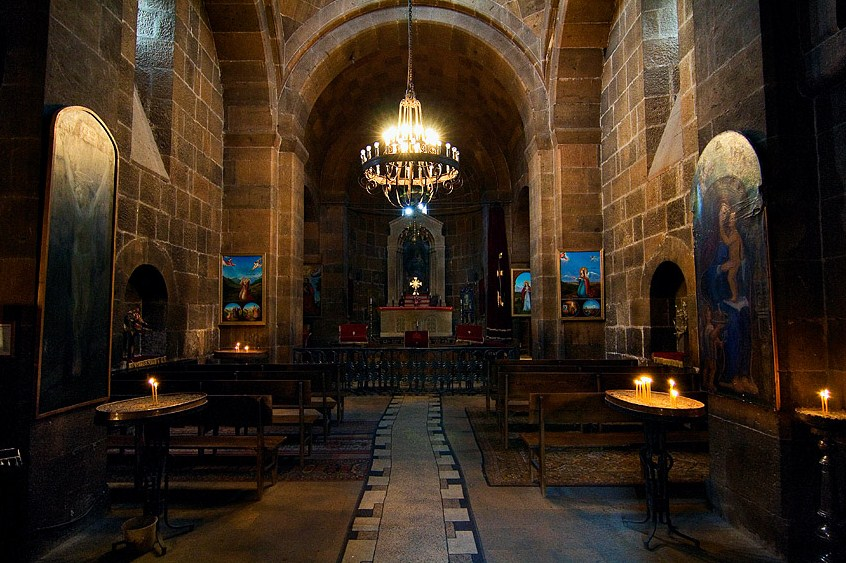
Interior of the church

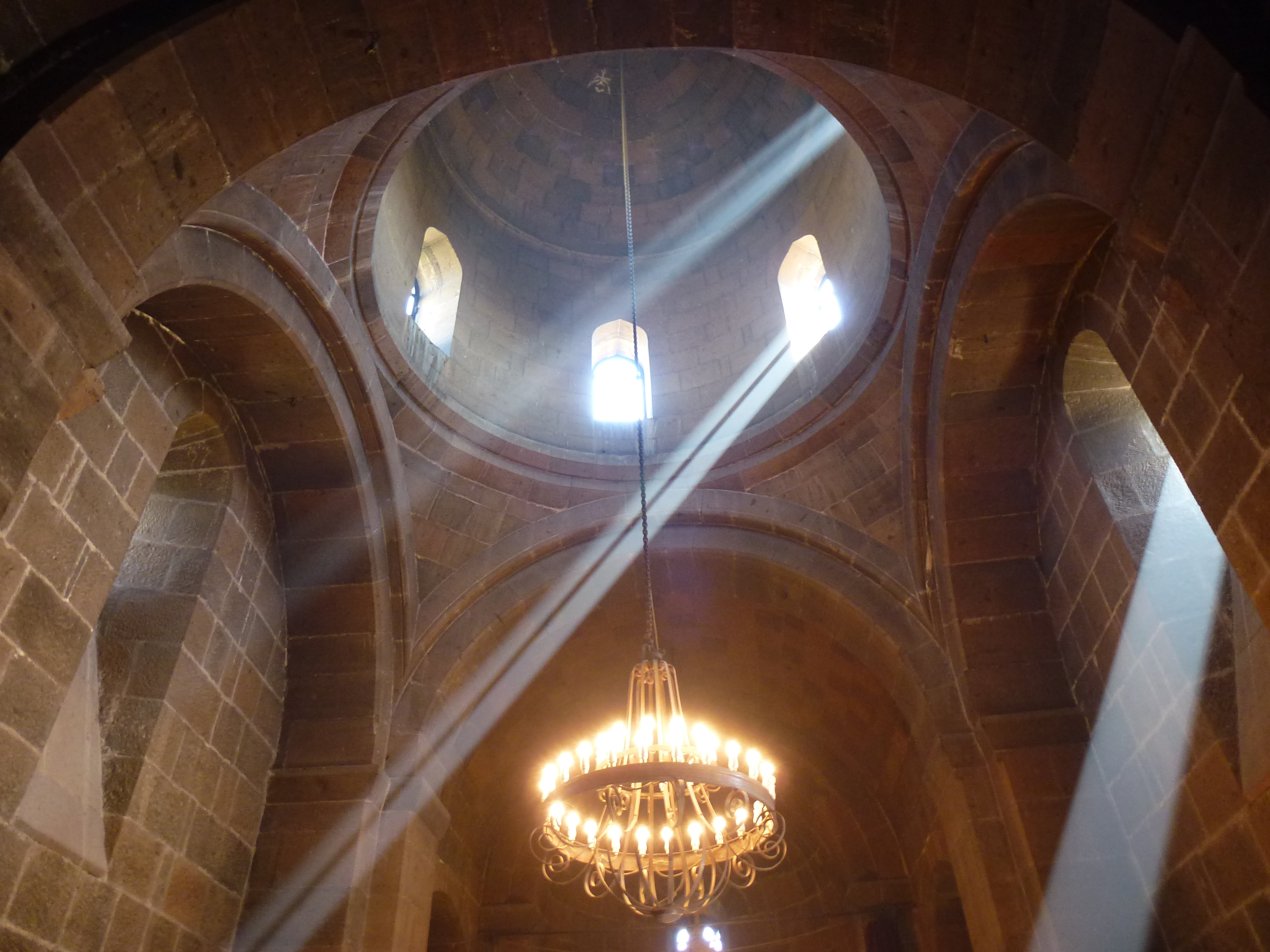
Dome interior

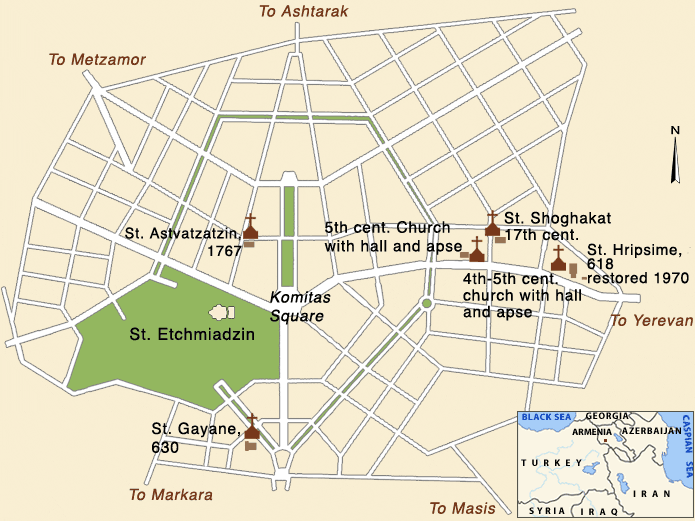
Map: Churches at Etchmiadzin.

== See also ==
- Etchmiadzin, Armenia
- Etchmiadzin Cathedral
- Saint Gayane Church
- Saint Hripsimé Church
- Zvartnots Cathedral
