= Vagharshapat =

Vagharshapat Վաղարշապատ
- City
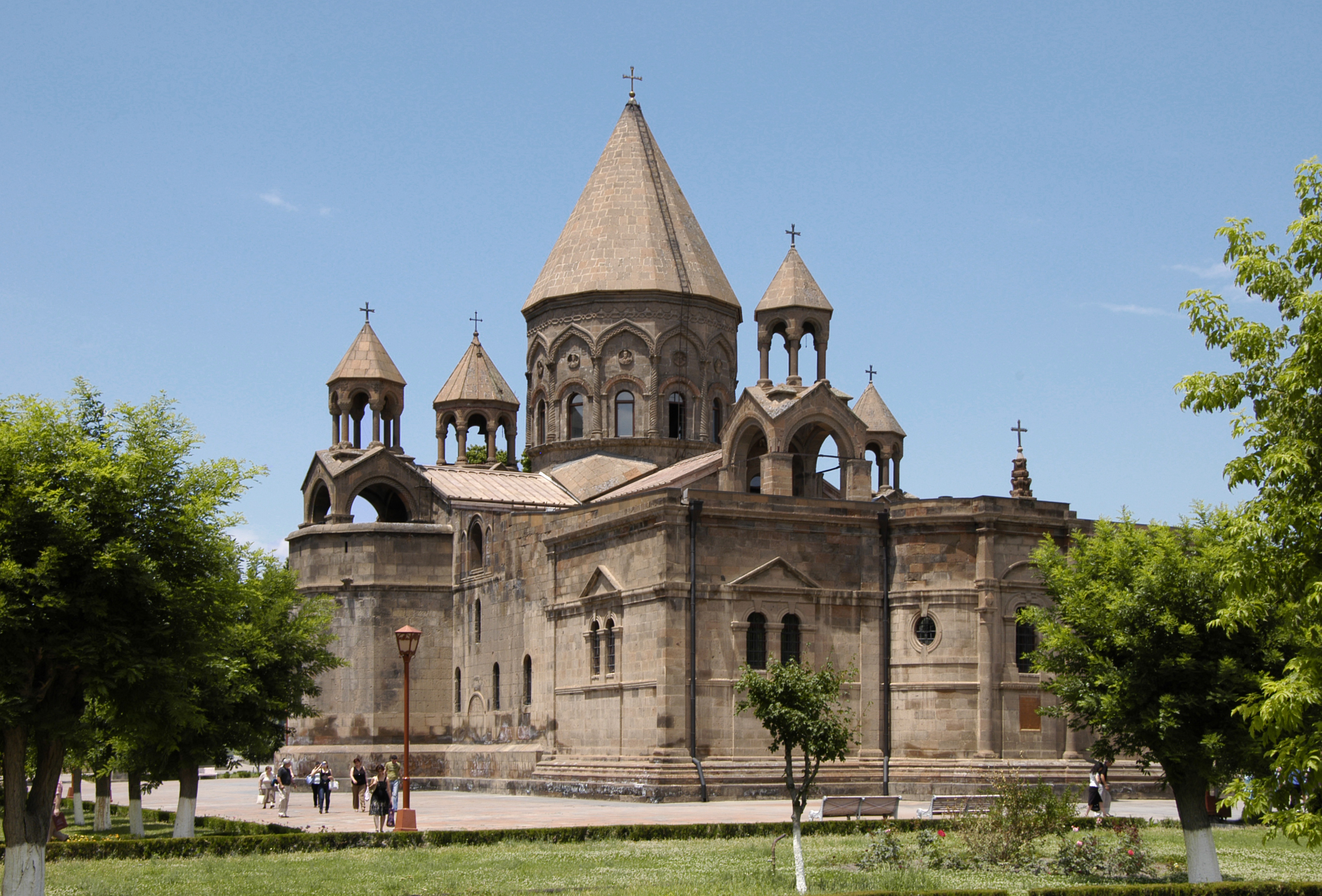
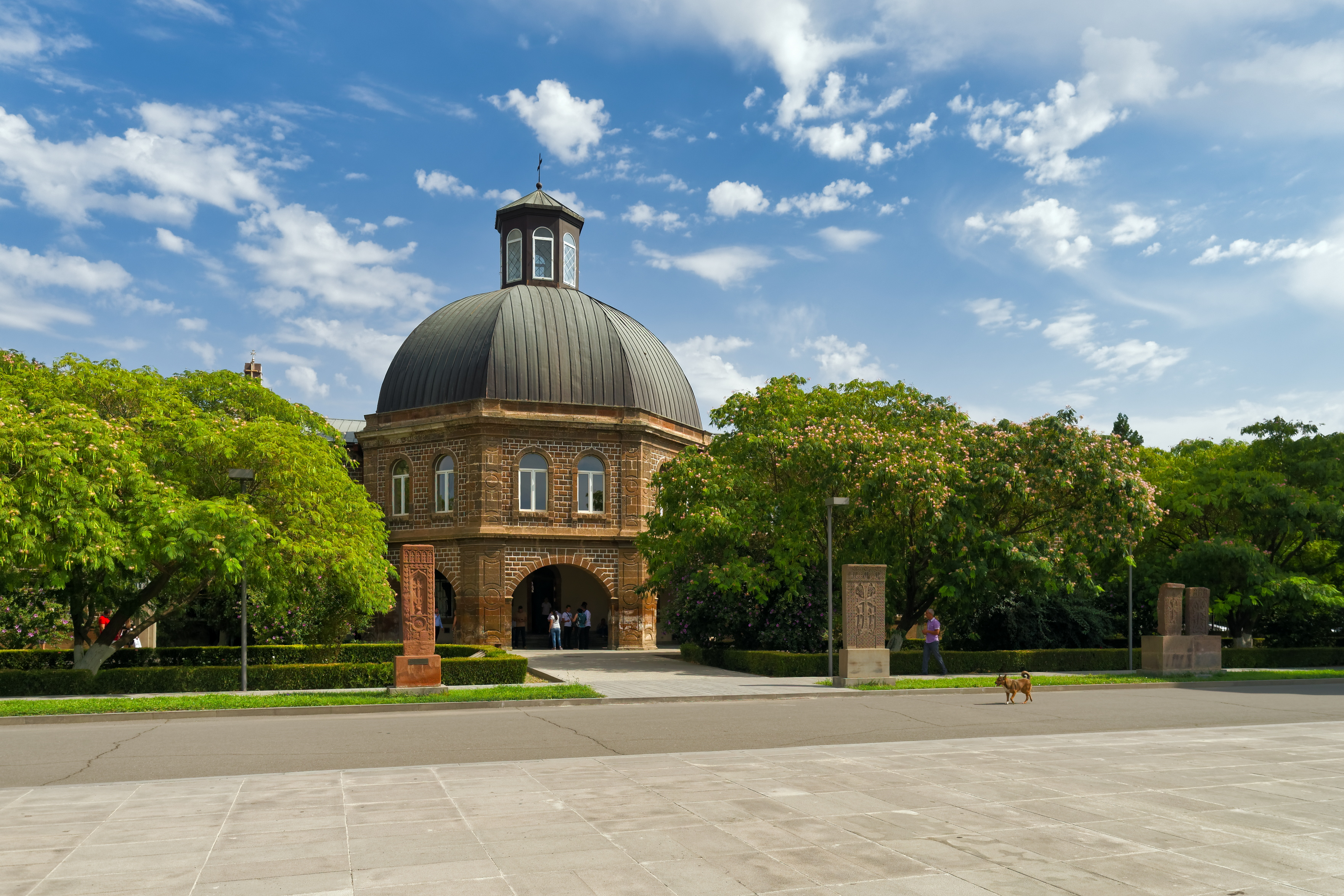
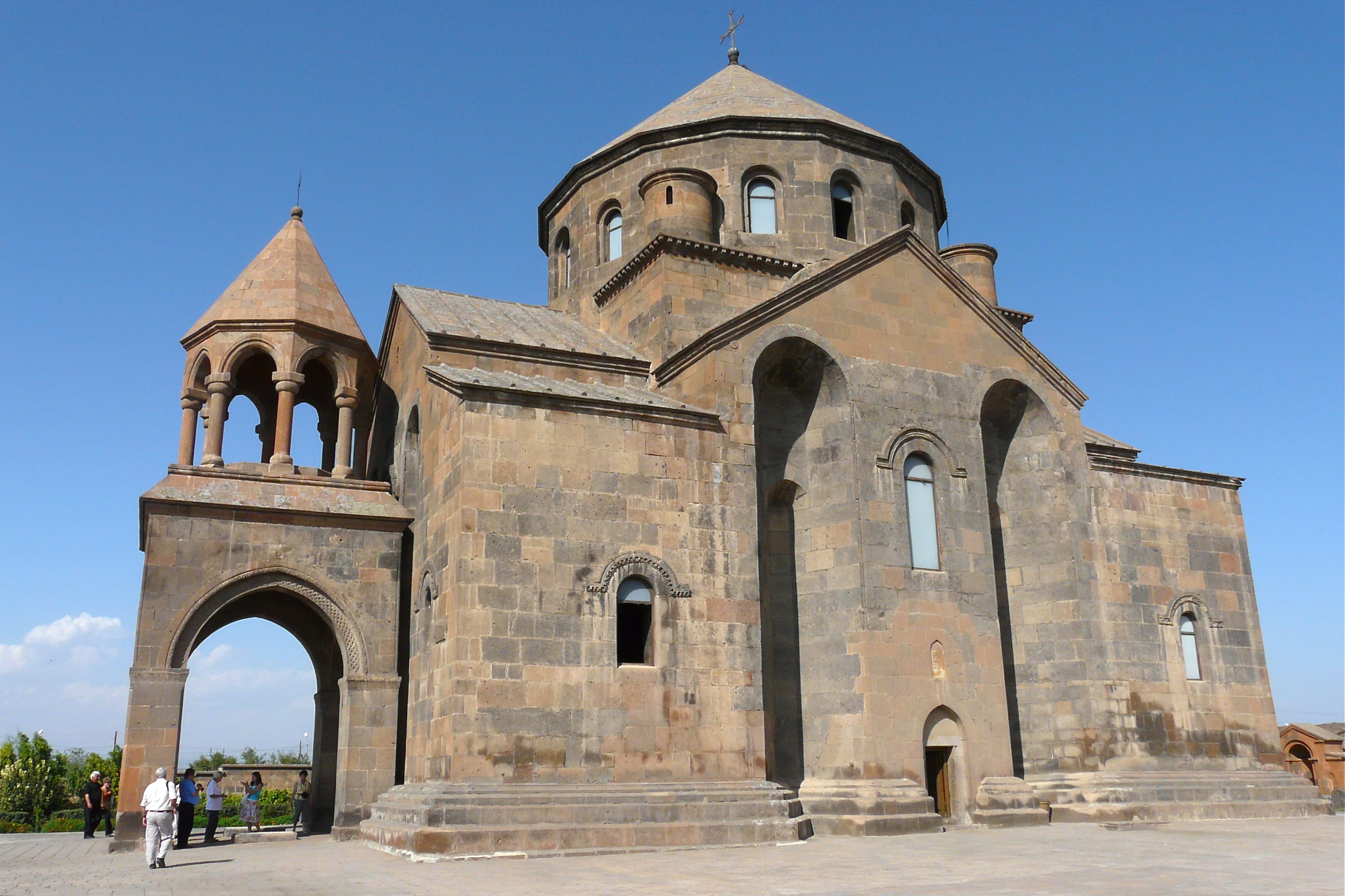
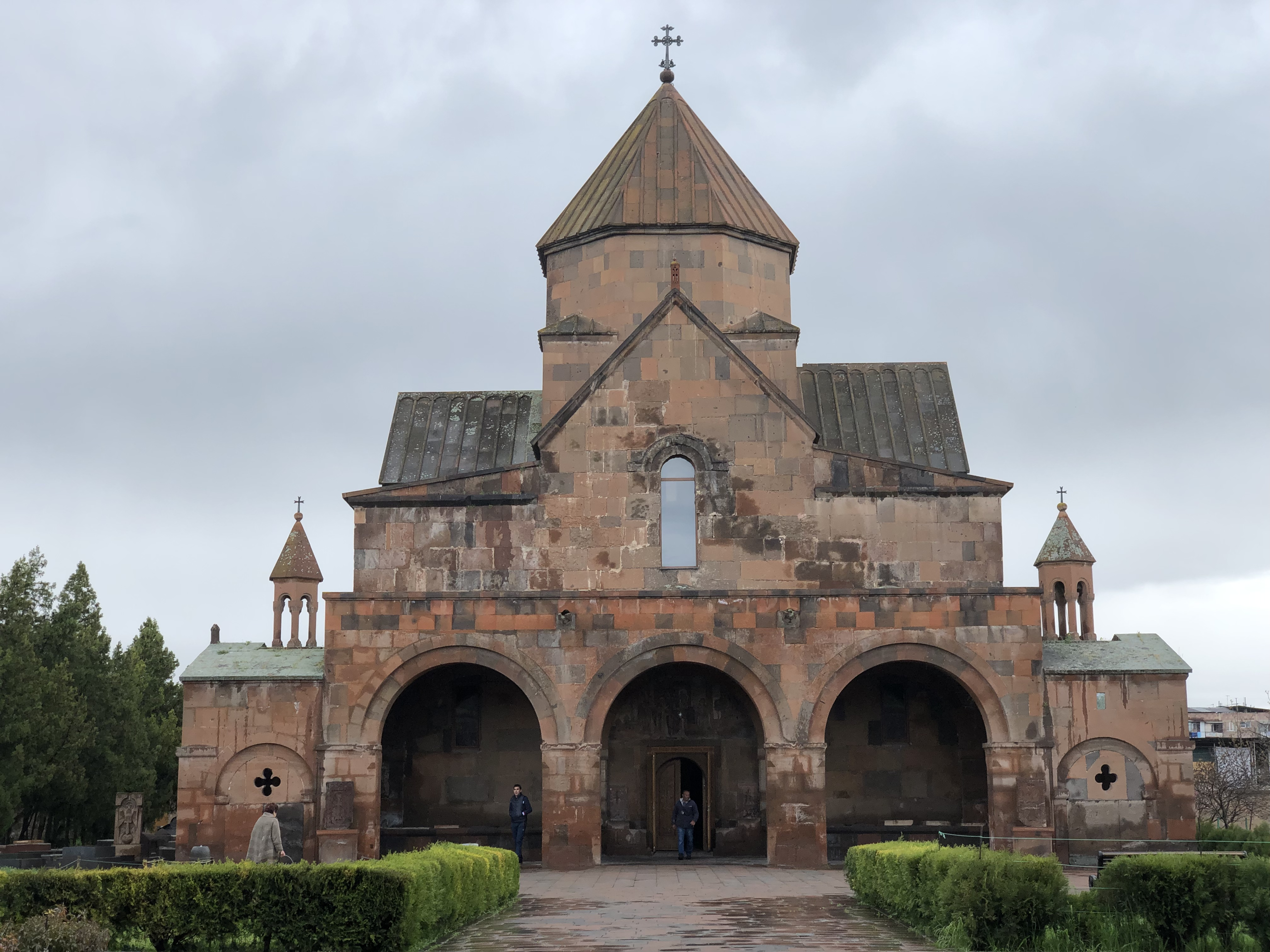
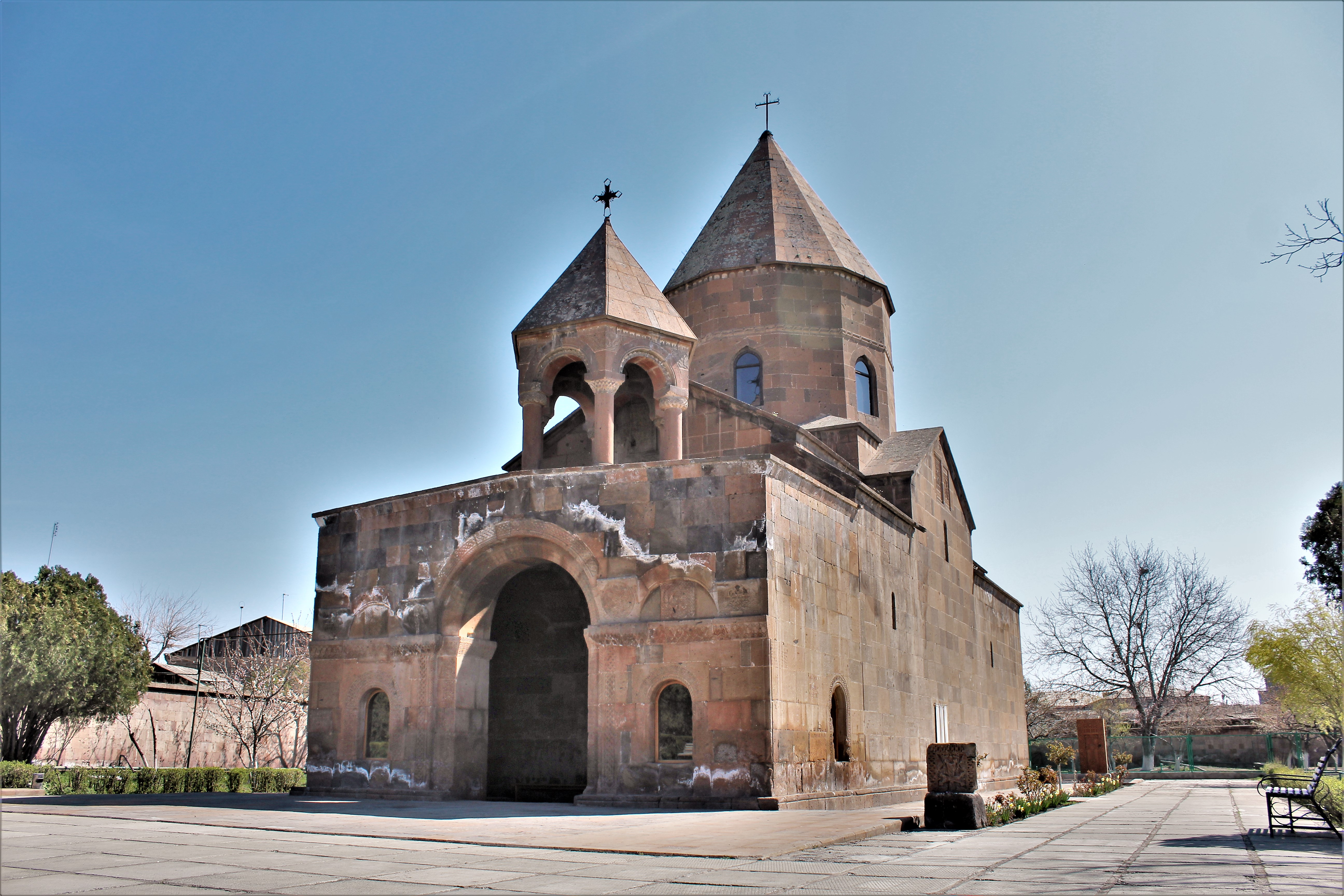
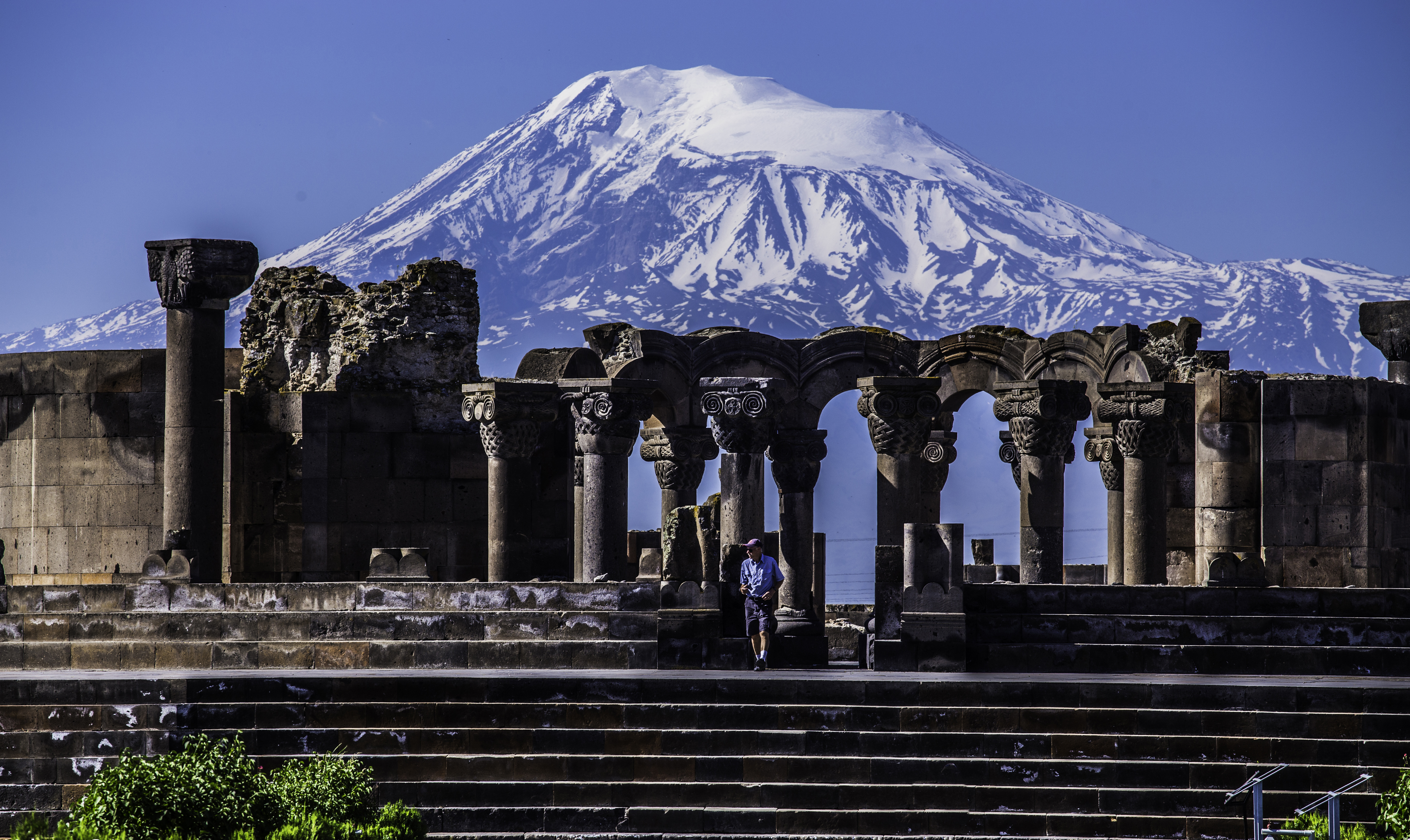
- Echmiadzin Cathedral Gevorgian Seminary St. Hripsime St. Gayane Shoghakat Zvartnots Cathedral and Mount Ararat

- Flag Seal

- Location within Armenia
- Coordinates: 40°10′22″N 44°17′33″E
- Country: Armenia
- Marz (Province): Armavir
- Founded: 685 BC

Government
  - Mayor: Levon Hakobyan

Area
  - Total: 40 km^{2} (15 sq mi)
- Elevation: 853 m (2,799 ft)

Population (2022 census)
  - Total: 44,837
  - Density: 1,100/km^{2} (2,900/sq mi)
- Time zone: UTC+4 (AMT)
- Area code: 0231
- Website: ejmiatsin.am

UNESCO World Heritage Site
- Official name: Cathedral and Churches of Echmiatsin and the Archaeological Site of Zvartnots
- Includes: Mother Cathedral of Echmiatsin and surrounding constructions; Church Saint Gayaneh and surrounding buildings; Cemetery of Congregation; Saint Hripsimeh Church; St. Shoghakat Church; Archaeological site of Zvartnots with ruins of the Temple, the Royal Palace, and other constructions
- Criteria: Cultural: (ii)(iii)
- Reference: 1011
- Inscription: 2000 (24th Session)
- Area: 74.3 ha (184 acres)

Vagharshapat (Armenian: Վաղարշապատ pronounced [vɑʁɑɾʃɑˈpɑt]) is the fifth largest city in Armenia and the most populous municipal community of Armavir Province, located about 18 km (11 mi) west of the capital Yerevan, and 10 km (6 mi) north of the Turkish-Armenian border. It is commonly known as Ejmiatsin (Էջմիածին, pronounced [ɛt͡ʃʰmi(j)ɑˈt͡sin], also spelled Echmiatsin), which was its official name between 1945 and 1995. It is still commonly used colloquially and in official bureaucracy, a case of dual naming.

The city is best known as the location of Etchmiadzin Cathedral and the Mother See of Holy Etchmiadzin, the center of the Armenian Apostolic Church. It is thus unofficially known in Western sources as a "holy city" and in Armenia as the country's "spiritual capital". It was one of the major cities and a capital of the ancient kingdom of Greater Armenia. Reduced to a small town by the early 20th century, it experienced large expansion during the Soviet period becoming, effectively, a suburb of Yerevan. Its population stands just over 37,000 based on 2016 estimates.

== Names ==
According to Movses Khorenatsi, the area of Vagharshapat was known as Artimed (Արտիմեդ), derived from the ancient Greek deity Artemis. Later, it was renamed Avan Vardgesi (Ավան Վարդգեսի, "Town of Vardges") or Vardgesavan (Վարդգեսավան) by Prince Vardges Manuk who rebuilt the settlement near the shores of Kasagh River, during the reign of King Orontes I of Armenia (570–560 BC). However, in his first book, Wars of Justinian, the Byzantine historian Procopius refers to the city as Valashabad (Balashabad), named after king Vologases I of Armenia. The name evolved into its later form by the shift of the medial l into a gh, which is common in the Armenian language. Movses Khorenatsi mentioned that the town of Vardges was entirely rebuilt and fenced by King Vagharsh I to become known as Norakaghak (Նորաքաղաք, "New City") and later Vagharshapat.

Ejmiatsin (Echmiatsin, Ēĵmiacin) literally means "the descent of the Only-Begotten" or "the Only-Begotten descended", from ej 'descent' (also the third person singular aorist of ijanem 'to descend') and miatsin 'only-begotten', referring to how Gregory the Illuminator had a vision of Jesus (the only-begotten son of God) descending to the place and marking it as where Gregory should erect churches. The name has been used to refer to Etchmiadzin Cathedral since the medieval period and in 1945 was extended also to the city and the surrounding district.

During the period of Persian rule, the city was also known by the Turkish name Üch-Kilisa, which means 'three churches', in reference to Echmiatsin Cathedral and the churches of Saint Hripsime and Saint Gayane.

== History ==
=== Early history ===
The territory of ancient Vagharshapat was inhabited since the 3rd millennium BC. Many sites, such as Metsamor Castle, Shresh hill and Mokhrablur hill date back to the Neolithic period. The first written records about Vagharshapat were found in the inscriptions left by the Urartian king Rusa II (685–645 BC), where it was mentioned as Kuarlini (Կուարլինի). The inscription found in the archaeological site of ancient Vagharshapat cites to a water canal opened by king Rusa II, between Ildaruni river (Hrazdan River) and the valley of Kuarlini.

According to 5th-century writer Movses Khorenatsi, the oldest name of Vagharshapat was Artimed (Արտիմեդ), derived from the ancient Greek deity Artemis. Later, it was renamed Avan Vardgesi (Ավան Վարդգեսի, "Town of Vardges") or Vardgesavan (Վարդգեսավան) after being rebuilt by prince Vardges Manuk near the shores of Kasagh River, during the reign of king Orontes I Sakavakyats of Armenia (570–560 BC).

In the first half of the 2nd century AD, under the reign of the Armenian Arsacid king Vagharsh I of Armenia (117–144), the old town of Vardgesavan was renovated and renamed Vagharshapat (Վաղարշապատ). Movses Khorenatsi mentioned that the Town of Vardges was entirely rebuilt and fenced by king Vagharsh I to become known as Norakaghak (Նորաքաղաք, "New City") and later Vagharshapat.

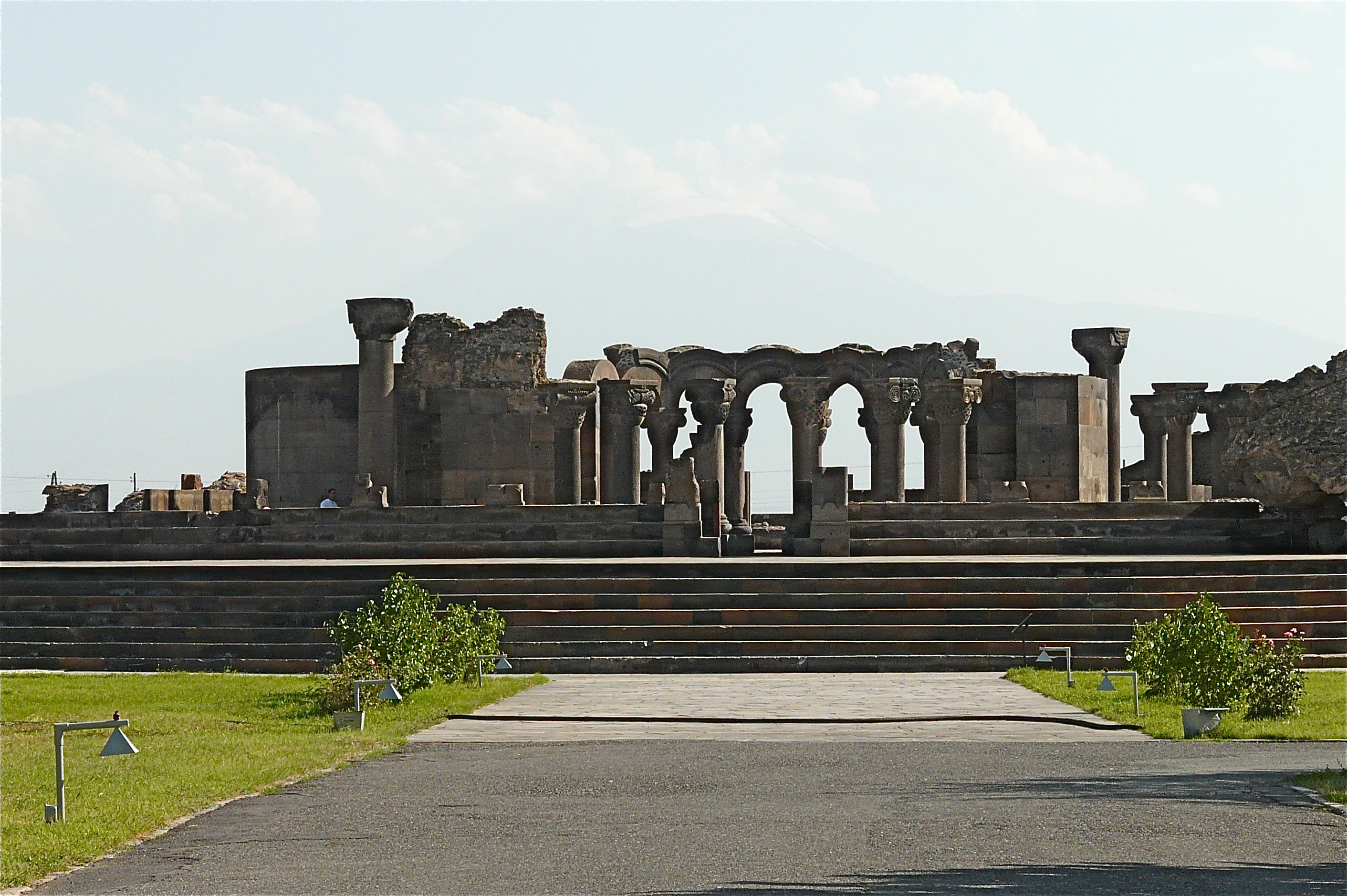
The remains of the 7th-century Cathedral of Zvartnots

Vagharshapat has served as the capital of the Arsacid Kingdom of Armenia between 120 AD and 330 AD. After embracing Christianity as a state religion in Armenia in 301, Vagharshapat was gradually called Ejmiatsin (Armenian: Էջմիածին), after the name of the Mother Cathedral; the seat of the Armenian Catholicosate, which is considered one of the oldest religious organizations in the world. As a spiritual centre of the entire Armenian nation, Vagharshapat has grown up rapidly and developed as an important centre of education and culture. The city was home to one of the oldest educational institutions in Armenia founded by Mesrop Mashtots.

The political capital of the Armenian kingdom was transferred to the city of Dvin in 336.

=== Middle Ages ===
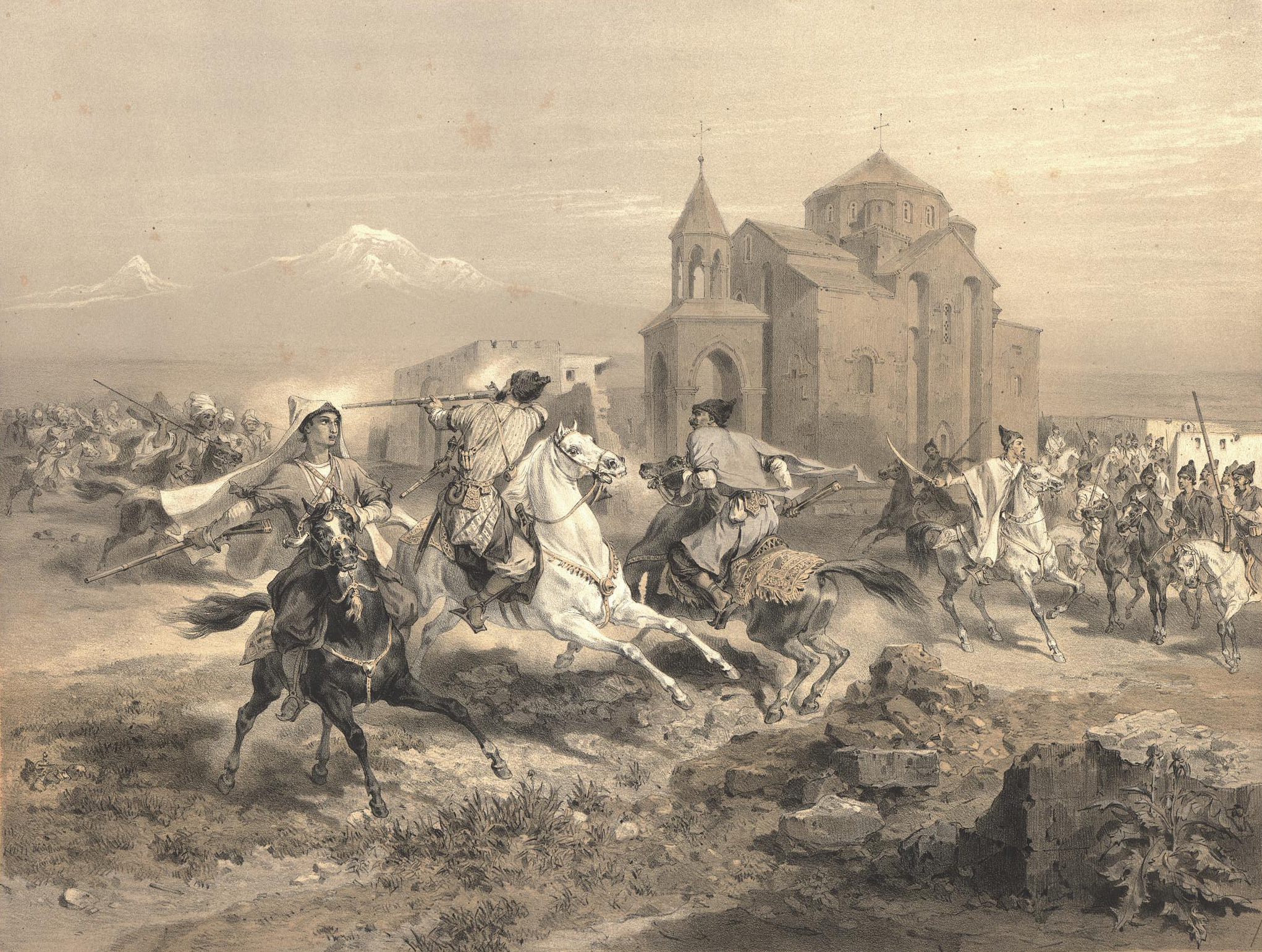
Kurds and Persians attacking Vagharshapat

Vagharshapat maintained its status as the country's most important city until the fall of the Arsacid Kingdom in 428. The city gradually lost its importance under the Persian rule, specifically when the seat of the Catholicosate was transferred to Dvin in 452. However, the first manuscript library in Armenia was founded in 480 in Vagharshapat.

The Armenian Church rejected the Council of Chalcedon (451) because they believed the Chalcedonian christology was too similar to Nestorianism; however, some Armenian bishops who were present in the territories of Roman Armenia signed the council's documents and also accepted Pope Leo I's 458 encyclical mandating adherence to the Chalcedonian Definition. In Persarmenia, the Persian Nestorian Church supported the spread of Nestorianism, which the Armenian Church had previously declared heretical and saw as a threat to the independence of their Church. Peter the Iberian, a Georgian prince, also strongly opposed the Chalcedonian Creed. Thus, in 491, Catholicos Babken I of Armenia, along with the Albanian and Iberian bishops met in Vagharshapat and issued a condemnation of the Chalcedonian Definition.

In 587 during the reign of emperor Maurice, Vagharshapat (then called Valarshapat) and much of Armenia came under Roman administration after the Romans defeated the Sassanid Persian Empire at the battle of the Blarathon.

In 658 AD, Vagharshapat, along with the rest of the Armenian highland, was conquered by the Arabs. The city was briefly revived between the 9th and 11th centuries under the Bagratid Kingdom of Armenia, before being overrun by the Byzantines in 1045 and later by the Seljuks in 1064.

In the middle of the 13th century, Vagharshapat became part of the Ilkhanate of the Mongol Empire. During the last quarter of the 14th century the Aq Qoyunlu Sunni Oghuz Turkic tribe took over Armenia, including Vagharshapat.

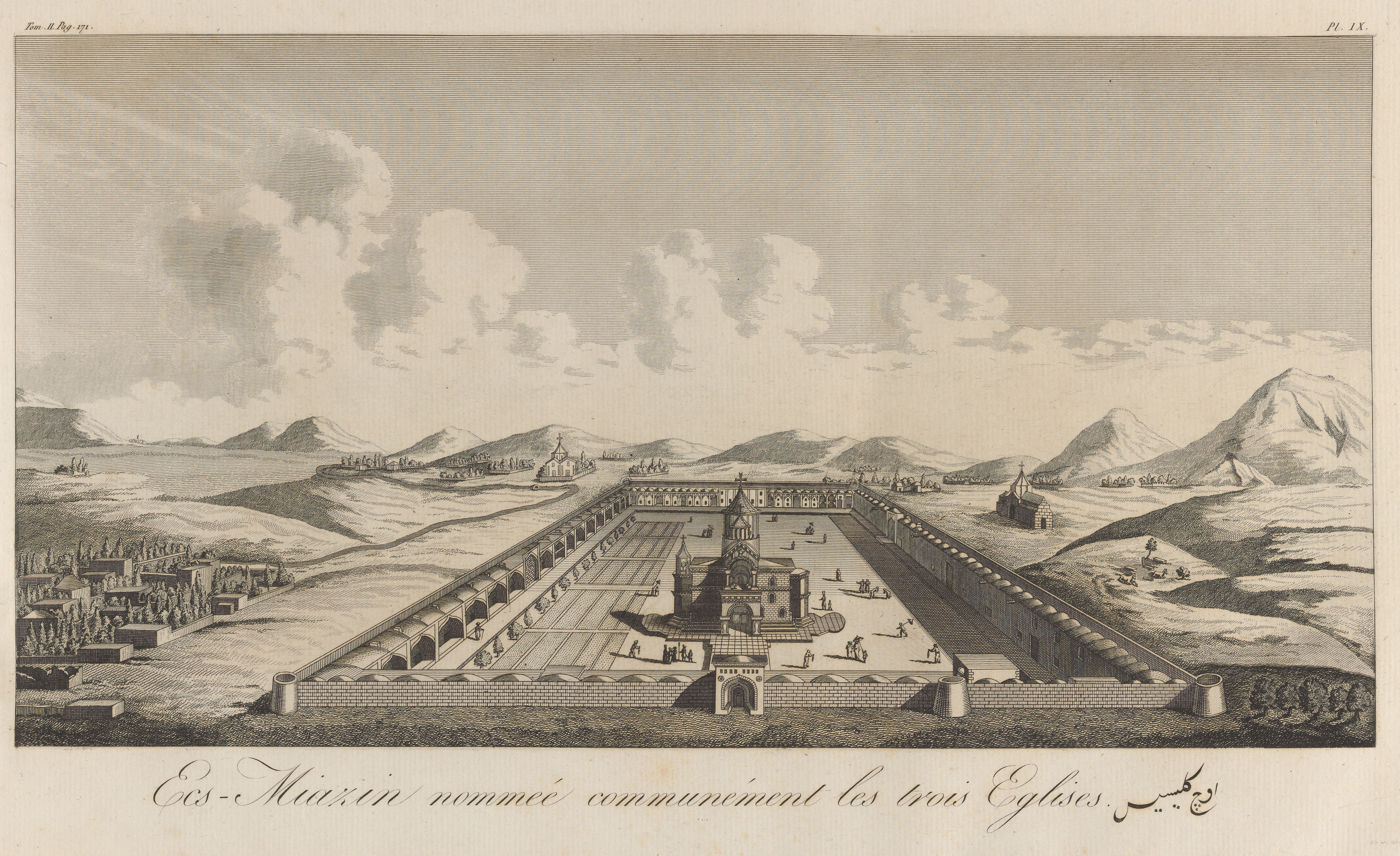
Engraving of Echmiatsin by Jean Chardin, 1670s

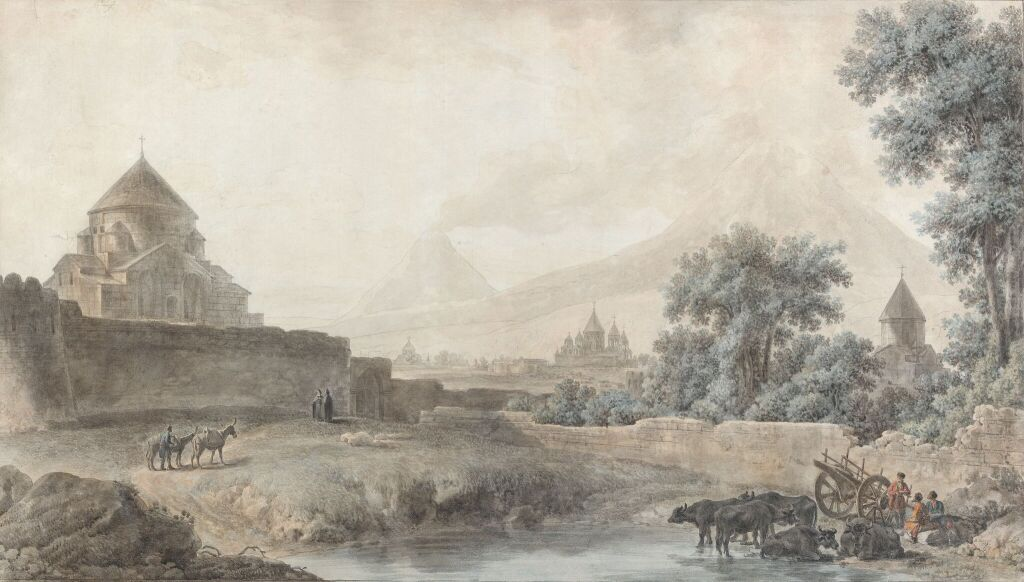
View of Echmiatsin by Russian painter Mikhail Ivanov, 1783

The influence of Vagharshapat waned between 1045 and 1441, when the seat of the Armenian Catholicosate was transferred from the Cilician city of Sis back to Etchmiadzin.

=== Early modern period ===
Between 1502 and 1828, Armenia became part of the Persian state under the rule of Safavid, Afsharid and Qajar dynasties, with short periods of Ottoman rule between 1578 and 1603 and later between 1722 and 1736.

In 1828, after the Russo-Persian War, Vagharshapat —as a part of the Erivan Khanate— was handed over to the Russian Empire as a result of the Treaty of Turkmenchay signed on 21 February 1828.

In their 1833 book Eli Smith and H. G. O. Dwight described Vagharshapat, then a village, as follows: "It presents nothing but a crowded collection of mud cabins, perhaps 500 in number."

With the establishment of the Erivan Governorate in 1850, Vagharshapat became the centre of the newly formed Echmiadzinsky Uyezd.

=== Present day ===
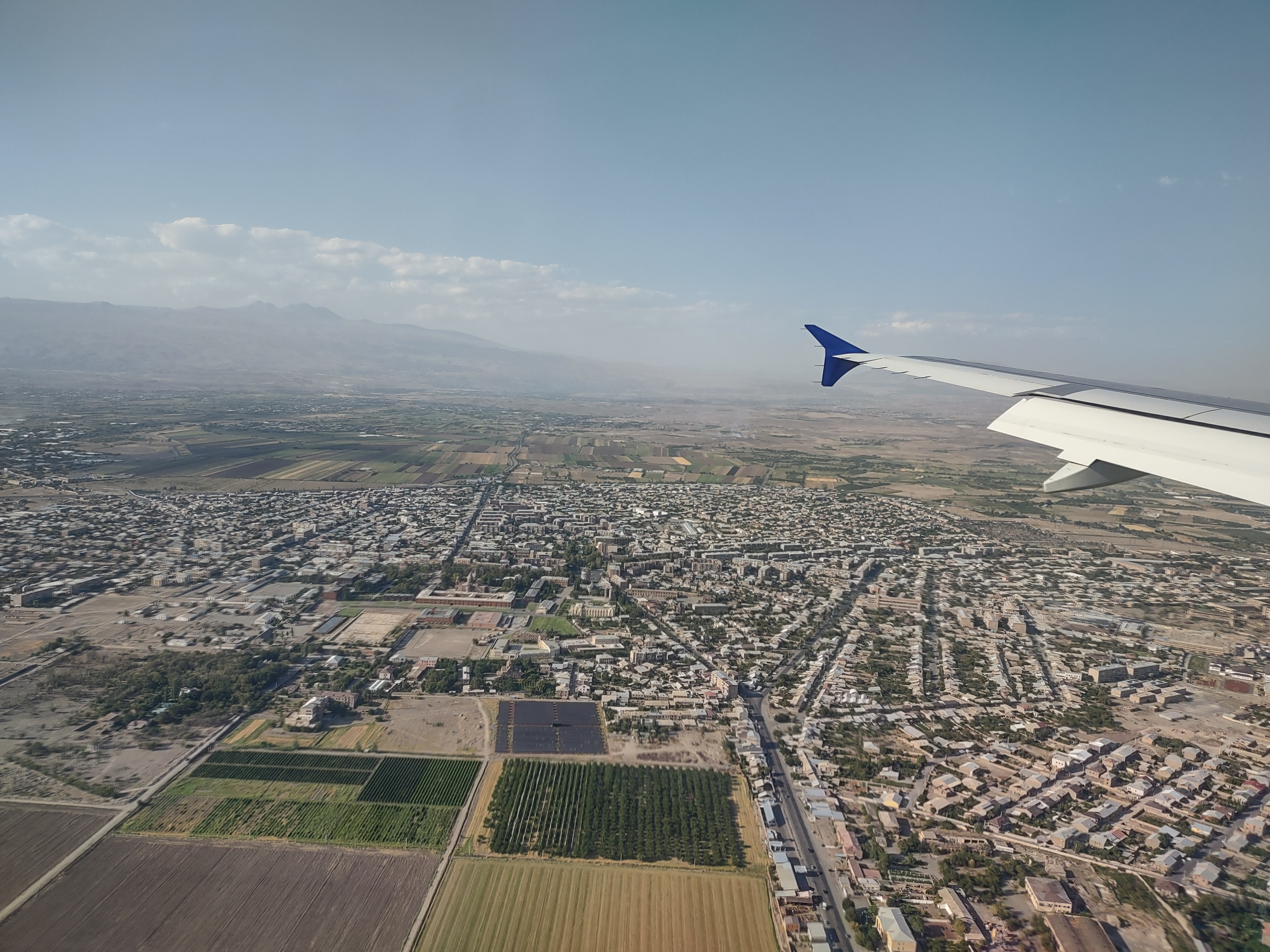
Vagharshapat with Ejmiatsin Cathedral Compound from the air

Armenia enjoyed a short period of independence between 1918 and 1920 before falling to the Bolshevik 11th Red Army and becoming part of the Soviet Union. In 1925, the new plan of rebuilding the modern town was introduced by architect Alexander Tamanian. It was finally completed between 1939 and 1943. In 1945, the town of Vagharshapat was officially renamed Echmiatsin by the Soviet government.

During the 1950s and 1960s, the town has witnessed a massive wave of construction, including residential buildings and industrial plants. By the end of the 1960s, the historical monuments of the town; including the religious complex of the Mother See of Holy Etchmiadzin, Saint Hripsime Church, Saint Gayane Church and the surrounding area of Zvartnots Cathedral, were entirely rehabilitated.

After the independence of Armenia, the town was officially renamed Vagharshapat in 1995. However, the town is still popularly known as Ejmiatsin.

In October 2018, Diana Gasparyan, who was nominated by the Civil Contract Party, was elected mayor of the city and the country's first ever female mayor.

== Geography and climate ==
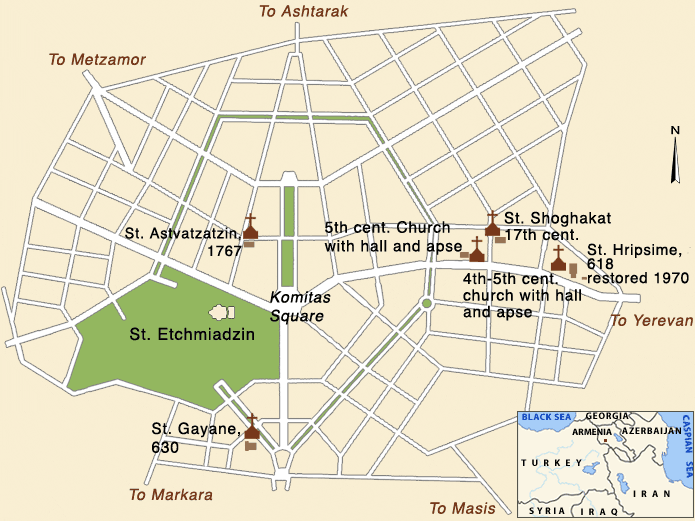
Map of modern-day Vagharshapat

Vagharshapat is the largest satellite-city of Yerevan and the 4th largest in Armenia by population. It is located to the west of Yerevan in the basin of the Kasagh River, in the northeastern extremity of Ararat plain, and very close to Zvartnots International Airport.

According to Moses of Chorene's History of Armenia and as a result of several archaeological researches conducted in the area, the most probable location of the ancient city of Vagharshapat is the area of Shresh Hill near Kasagh River.

Shresh Hill or the Kond of Ghugo, as it was called by the local population, is only 500 metres (1,600 feet) away to the northeast of modern-day Vagharshapat, on the way to Oshakan. It is an artificial hill and has a diameter of 123 metres (404 feet) long. It was first excavated in 1870. In 1913 and 1928, the area was excavated by archaeologist Yervand Lalayan. Large-scale excavations were conducted around the hill and the nearby sites of Metsamor and Mokhrablur between 1945 and 1950.

Historically, Vagharshapat is at the heart of the Armenian Highland, in Aragatsotn canton (Armenian: Արագածոտն գաւառ Aragatsotn gavar, not to be confused with the current Aragatsotn Province) of Ayrarat province, within Armenia Major.

The city has an average elevation of 853 metres (2,799 feet) above sea level. The climate is cold semi-arid (Köppen climate classification BSk).

Climate data for Vagharshapat
Month	Jan	Feb	Mar	Apr	May	Jun	Jul	Aug	Sep	Oct	Nov	Dec	Year
Mean daily maximum °C (°F)	1.6 (34.9)	4.4 (39.9)	11.6 (52.9)	19.0 (66.2)	24.4 (75.9)	28.8 (83.8)	33.1 (91.6)	32.5 (90.5)	28.4 (83.1)	20.5 (68.9)	12.4 (54.3)	4.9 (40.8)	18.5 (65.2)
Daily mean °C (°F)	−2.9 (26.8)	−0.5 (31.1)	5.9 (42.6)	12.5 (54.5)	17.4 (63.3)	21.4 (70.5)	25.4 (77.7)	25.0 (77.0)	20.4 (68.7)	13.5 (56.3)	6.8 (44.2)	0.6 (33.1)	12.1 (53.8)
Mean daily minimum °C (°F)	−7.3 (18.9)	−5.3 (22.5)	0.2 (32.4)	6.1 (43.0)	10.5 (50.9)	14.1 (57.4)	17.8 (64.0)	17.5 (63.5)	12.4 (54.3)	6.5 (43.7)	1.2 (34.2)	−3.6 (25.5)	5.8 (42.5)
Average precipitation mm (inches)	20 (0.8)	22 (0.9)	27 (1.1)	36 (1.4)	51 (2.0)	29 (1.1)	16 (0.6)	12 (0.5)	14 (0.6)	29 (1.1)	25 (1.0)	20 (0.8)	301 (11.9)
Source: Climate-Data.org

== Demographics ==
Vagharshapat is the largest urban community of Armavir Province. However, the population of the town has gradually declined since the collapse of the Soviet Union.

The majority of the town's population are ethnic Armenians who belong to the Armenian Apostolic Church. The regulating body of the church is the Diocese of Armavir based in the nearby town of Armavir. Between 1996 and 2014, the Holy Mother of God Church of Vagharshapat has served as the seat of the diocese. Opened in 1767 by Catholicos Simeon I, the church is located at the centre of Vagharshapat, north of the Mother See of Holy Etchmiadzin.

Here is a population timeline of Vagharshapat since 1830:

Date	Population	Note(s)
1830	2,175	the fourth largest in the Armenian Oblast
1831	2,175	100% Armenian
1873	2,787	
c. 1891	3,000	overwhelmingly populated by Armenians
1897	5,267	94.8% Armenians
1908	3,283	Mostly Armenian
1914	5,755	
1919	16,886	
1926	8,436	99.1% Armenians
1931	8,349	
1959	19,560	
1968	27,100	
1976	42,000–44,040	
1990	60,000	
2001	51,280	de facto population
2001	56,388	de jure population
2004	56,400	
2011	46,540	de facto population
2022	44,837	

== Landmarks ==
The Mother Cathedral of Holy Echmiatsin is found in the complex surrounded with many other structures built throughout the centuries. Most buildings are of great architectural significance, such as the old and new Pontifical Residences, the Chancellery or the Divanatoon, the Gate of King Trdat, Alex and Marie Manoogian Treasury Museum (1982), Khrimian Museum, Yeremian Monastic cells, the old Seminary building, the Clock Tower, the Bookstore, etc.

Gevorgian Seminary is a theological college of the Armenian Apostolic Church founded by Catholicos Gevork IV in 1874 within the complex of the Mother See. Apart from the Mother Cathedral, Vagharshapat is home to many other important Armenian churches and cathedrals. The Cathedral of Echmiatsin the Churches of Saint Hripsimé, Saint Gayane and Saint Shoghakat, and the archaeological site of Zvartnots are listed among the UNESCO World Heritage Sites.

=== UNESCO World Heritage Site ===
Cathedral and Churches of Echmiatsin and the Archaeological Site of Zvartnots
UNESCO World Heritage Site
- Interactive map of Cathedral and Churches of Echmiatsin and the Archaeological Site of Zvartnots
- Criteria: Cultural: ii, iii
- Reference: 1011
- Inscription: 2000 (24th Session)
- Area: 74.3 ha (184 acres)

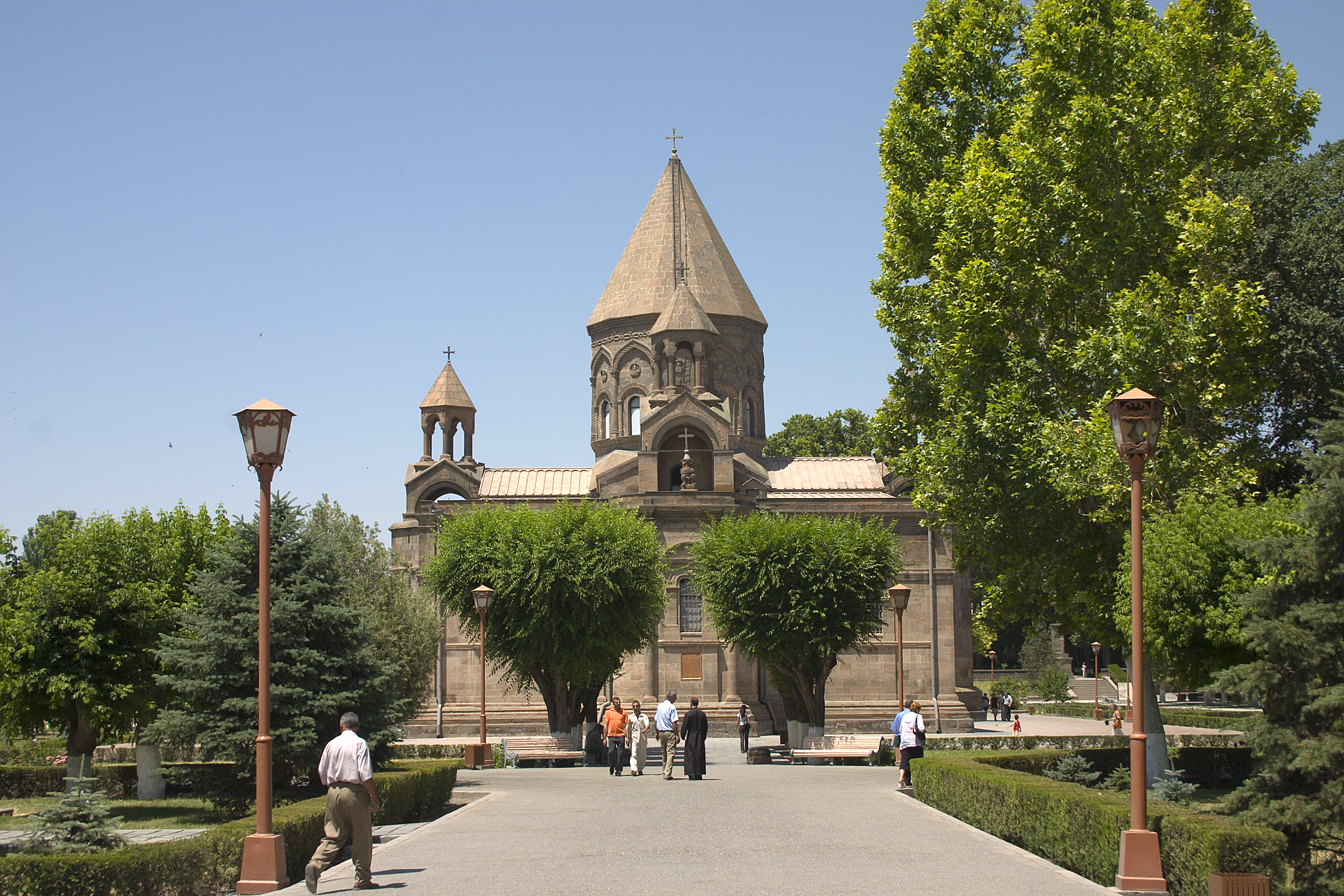
Etchmiadzin Cathedral

In 2000, the churches of Vagharshapat, together with the nearby ruin of Zvartnots Cathedral, were designated a UNESCO World Heritage Site. Principal churches include:

- Etchmiadzin Cathedral (Armenian: Մայր Տաճար Սուրբ Էջմիածին Mayr Tachar Surb Ejmiatsin) – The "Mother Cathedral" was built by Gregory the Illuminator as a vaulted basilica in 301–303, when Armenia had just adopted Christianity as a state religion, making it one of the oldest churches in the world. The church was repeatedly enlarged, notably in 480, 618 and 1658.
- Saint Hripsime Church – The church was erected in 618 by Catholicos Gomidas atop an existing mausoleum containing the remains of the martyred Saint Hripsimé. According to the 17th century Armenian historian Arakel of Tabriz, when the church was renovated during 1651–1653 by Catholicos Philip I, a cross was placed on top of the roof and a small portico was added to the western side. It is one of the few churches in Armenian that remained active during the Soviet period.
- Saint Gayane Church – Built in 630 by Catholicos Ezra I, Saint Gayane is a three-nave, domed basilica with an octagonal drum resting on four internal pillars that divide the interior of the church into three. Its design remained unchanged despite partial renovations of the dome and some ceilings in 1652.
- Shoghakat Church – Meaning drop of light, Shoghakat is a single-nave domed basilica, built and completed in 1694 by prince Aghamal Sorotetsi during the period of Catholicos Nahabed I. It is built with red and black tufa stones, erected on the remains of a 6th-century basilica. The remains of a 4th-century small chapel could be seen at the southwestern end of Saint Shoghakat Church.
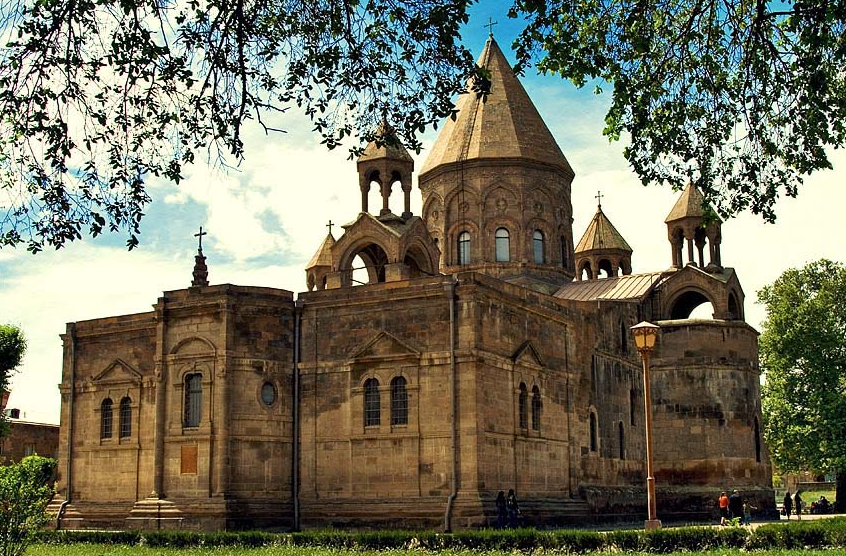
Ejmiatsin Cathedral 303

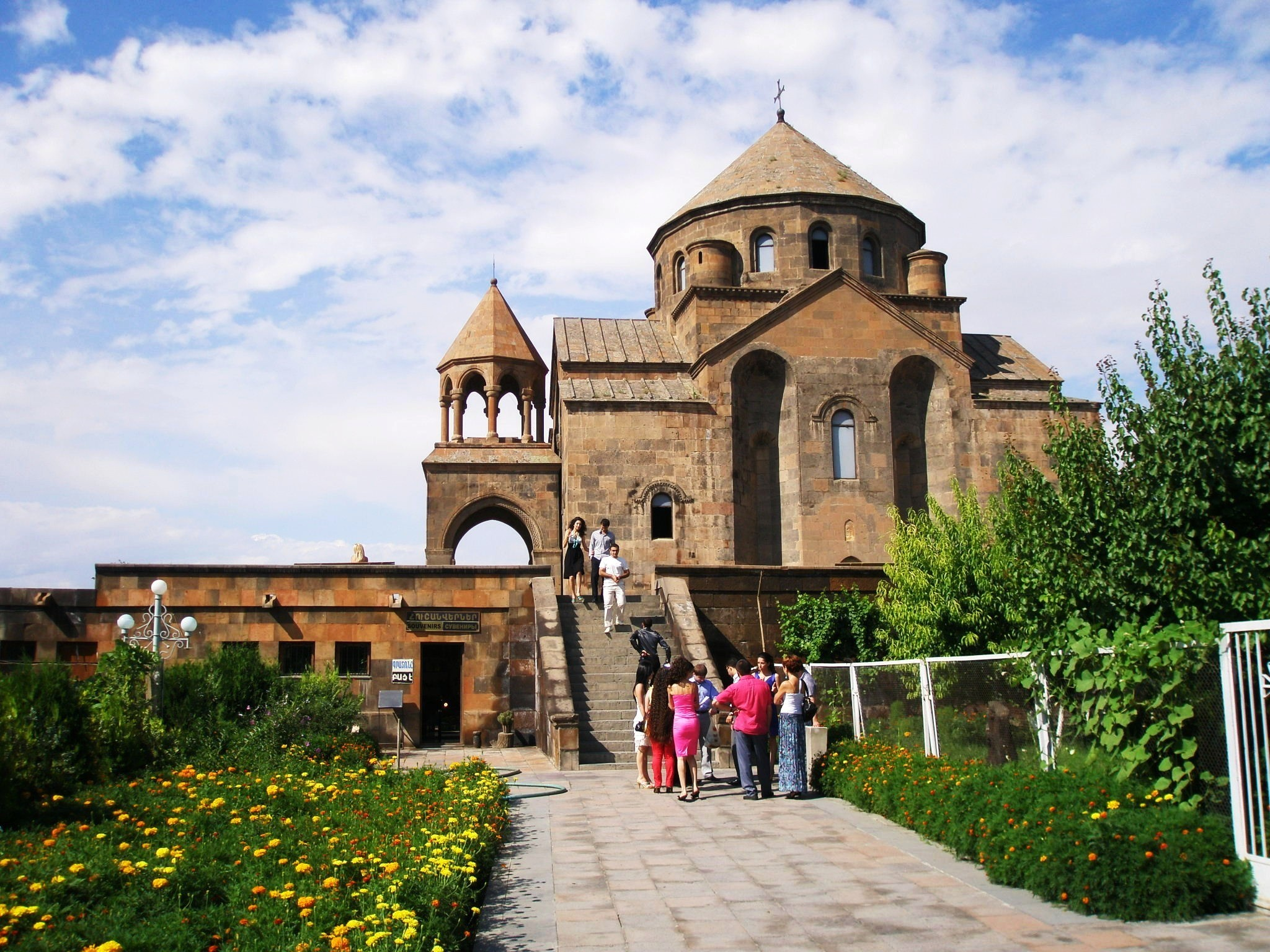
Saint Hripsimé Church, opened in 618

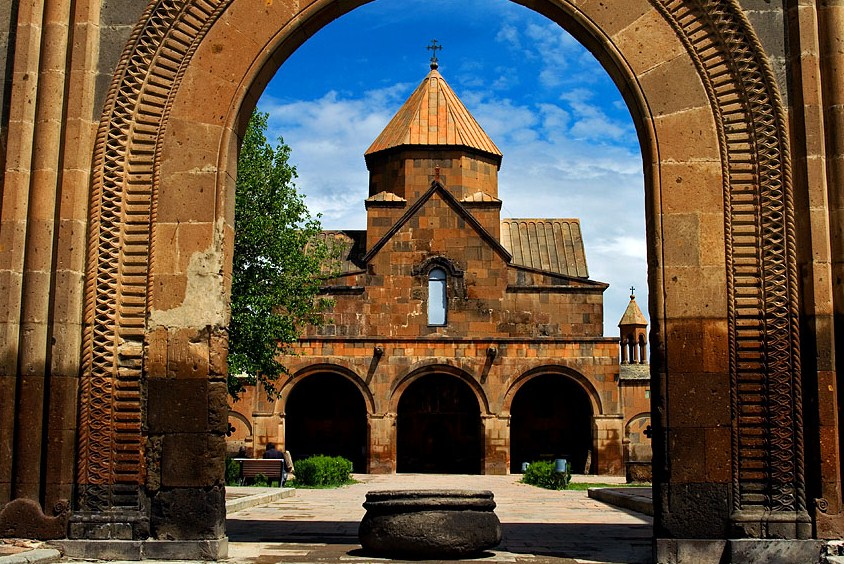
Saint Gayane Church, opened in 630

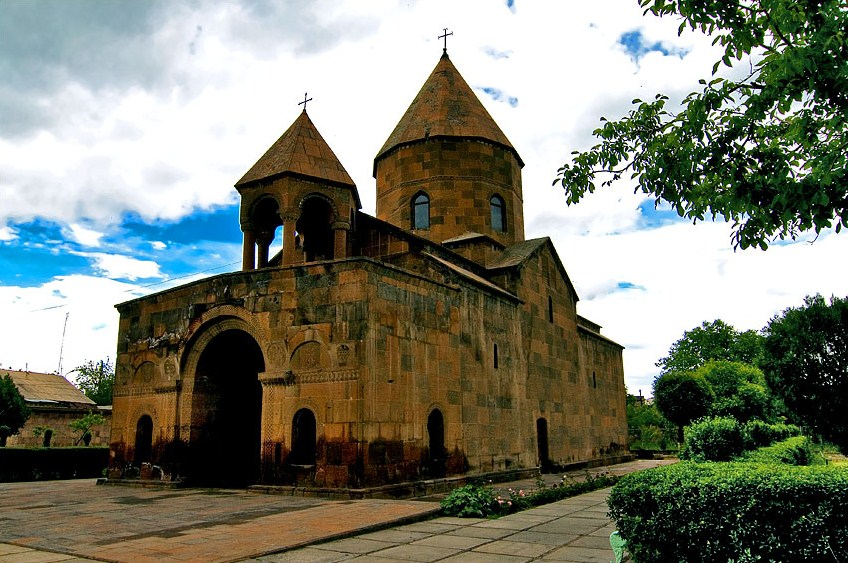
Shoghakat Church, opened in 1694

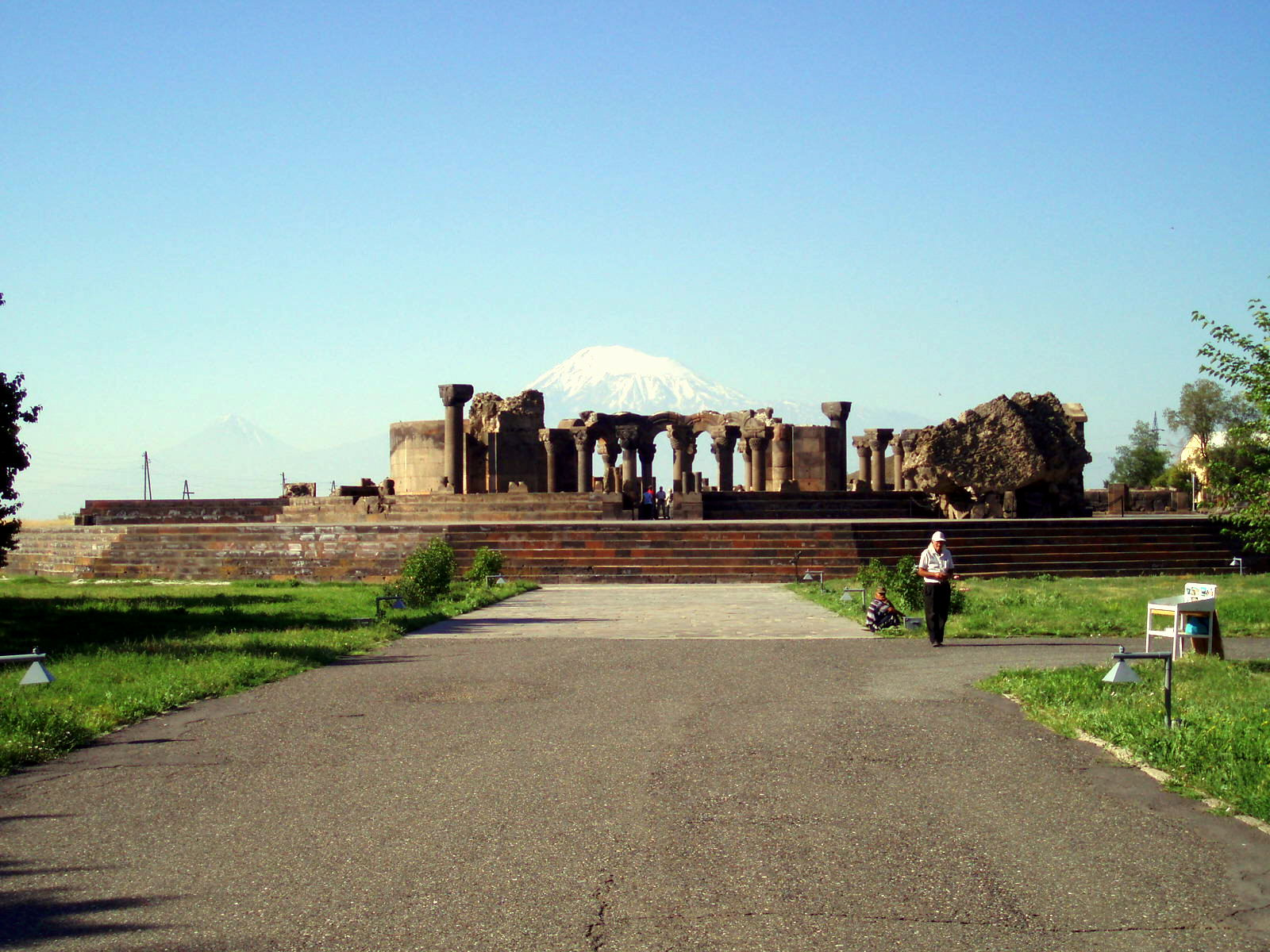
Zvartnots Cathedral, opened in 652

== Culture ==
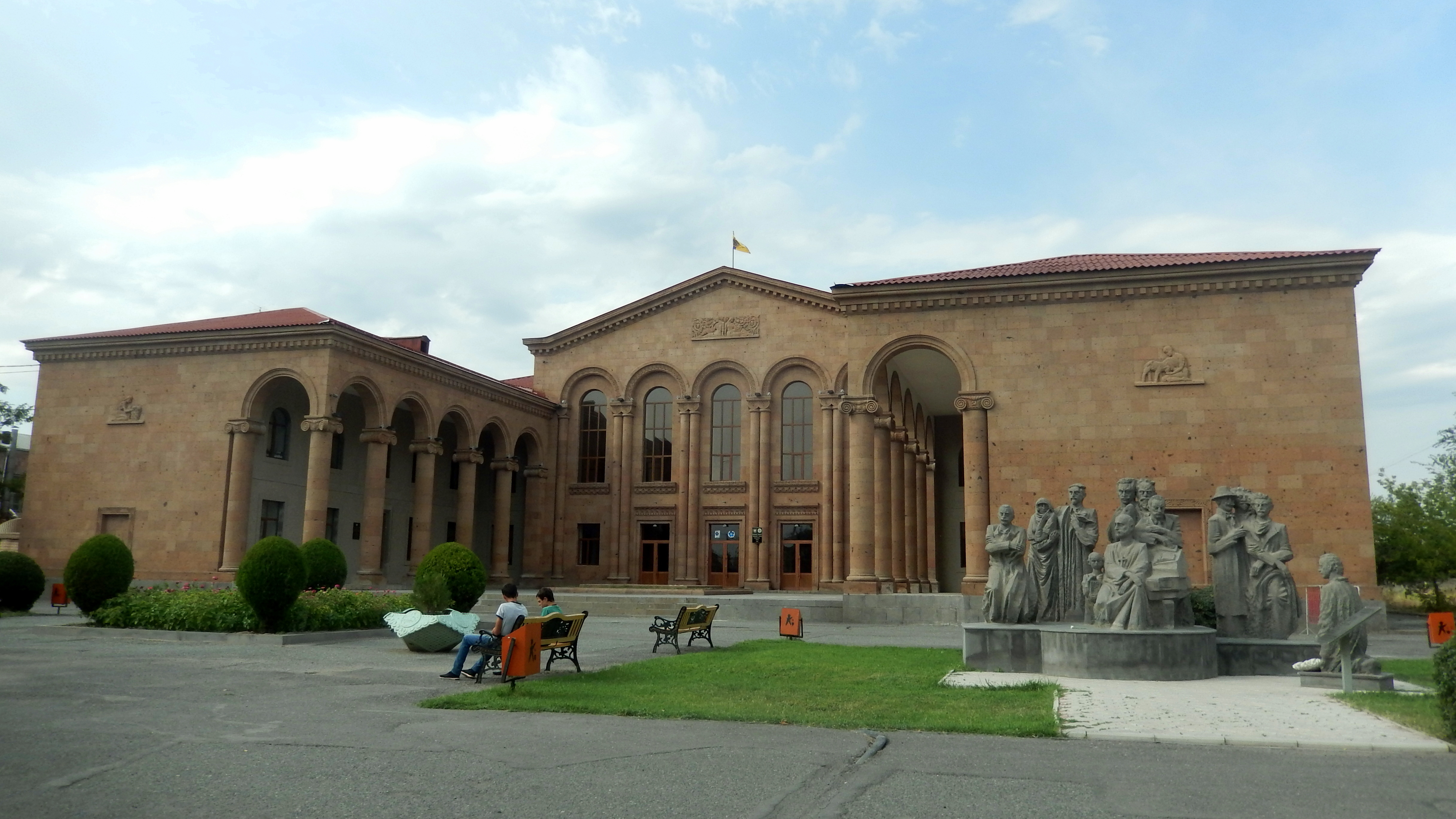
Komitas palace of culture in Vagharshapat

Vagharshapat is the cultural center of Armavir and one of the important centers of the entire republic. The Komitas Palace of Culture is operating in the town since 1957, while the Ejmiatsin National Gallery is operating since 1970.

The town is also home to a number of museums including the Vagharshapat Ethnographic Museum, Khoren Ter-Harutyunyan Museum and Gallery, Mher Abeghian Museum and Gallery, and Hovhannes Hovhannisyan House-museum. However, the most prominent museums of Vagharshapat are located within the Mother See complex, including:

- Ejmiatsin Cathedral Museum opened in 1869 by Catholicos George IV,
- The Catholicosal Museum within the old pontifical residence or Hin Veharan built in 1738–1741 and serves as Catholicosal Museum since 1968.
- Khrimian Museum: built and opened in 1896 by Catholicos Mkrtich I of Van. It was recently renovated to become a museum of art.
- Alex and Marie Manoogian Treasury House: opened on 11 October 1982, designed by architect Baghdasar Arzoumanian. The museum is home to treasures of the Armenian Church throughout history.
- Ruben Sevak Museum: opened in 2013 within the Ghazarapat building of the Mother See.

The Mother See is also home to the Pontifical Bookstore operating since 1962, and the *Vatche and Tamar Manoukian Manuscript Depository opened in 2012.

The town celebrates the "Ejmiatsin Day" annually since 2008 in Vagharshapat on 8 October. According to the old Armenian tradition, Mesrop Mashtots brought the newly created Armenian alphabet to Vagharshapat on 8 October 405.

== Transportation ==
Vagharshapat is connected with Yerevan and southern Armenia through the M-5 Motorway, while the M-3 Motorway connects the town with northern Armenia.

The Zvartnots International Airport of Yerevan is located only 10 kilometres (6 miles) east of Vagharshapat.

Being located 20 km west of the capital Yerevan, Vagharshapat is connected with the capital city with public vans, locally known as marshrutka. These vehicles used to be mainly Russian-made GAZelle vans with 13 seats. However, they have changed since 2018. The Vagharshapat-Yerevan buses have regular trips every day from 7 am to 9 pm and cost 300 Armenian drams. The route starts from the station near Ejmiatsin State College after Vardges Hamazaspyan and finishes at the end of Mashtots Avenue, near to Matenadaran. Except for the Vagharshapat-Yerevan buses, taxis designed specifically for Vagharshapat-Yerevan trips also operate. Taxis start the route from the center of Vagharshapat and finish at the station near to Blue Mosque. The current rate of the Vagharshapat-Yerevan taxis is 500 Armenian drams per person. Currently, there are 2 smart bus stops in the city.

== Economy ==
=== Industry ===
Vagharshapat was home to the 1st paper factory in the history of Armenia. In 1780, Catholicos Simeon I of Yerevan founded the Etchmiadzin Paper Factory which served for 6 years.

Under the Soviet rule, the town was turned into an important industrial centre. It was home to 4 major industrial firms specialized in the production of military technology. However, the productivity of the plants declined after the fall of the Soviet Union.

Currently, the industry of the town is mainly based on food-processing. The largest industrial firms of the town are the Ejmiatsin Instrument Making Factory founded in 1966, the E.P.G. Ejmiatsin Cannery founded in 1969, the Ejmiatsin Kat dairy factory founded in 1997, the Sonimol plant for grains founded in 2001, the Ejmiatsin wine brandy and vodka factory founded in 2005, and the Ekologia V.K.H. biological waste destruction plant founded in 2009.

=== Tourism ===
Being the spiritual centre of the Armenian nation worldwide, Vagharshapat is a major tourist destination for Armenians as well as foreign visitors. It is home to the UNESCO World Heritage Sites of Etchmiadzin Cathedral, Zvartnots Cathedral, Saint Hripsime Church, Saint Gayane Church and Shoghakat Church, grouped overall as the Cathedral and Churches of Echmiatsin and the Archaeological Site of Zvartnots.

The Machanents Touristic Centre of Vagharshapat provides a unique facility for the visitors of the town. The complex houses a cultural centre with small theatre, pub and jazz club, traditional cuisine, and a boutique hotel. The Zvartnots hotel and casino complex is located at the eastern entrance of the town.

== Education ==
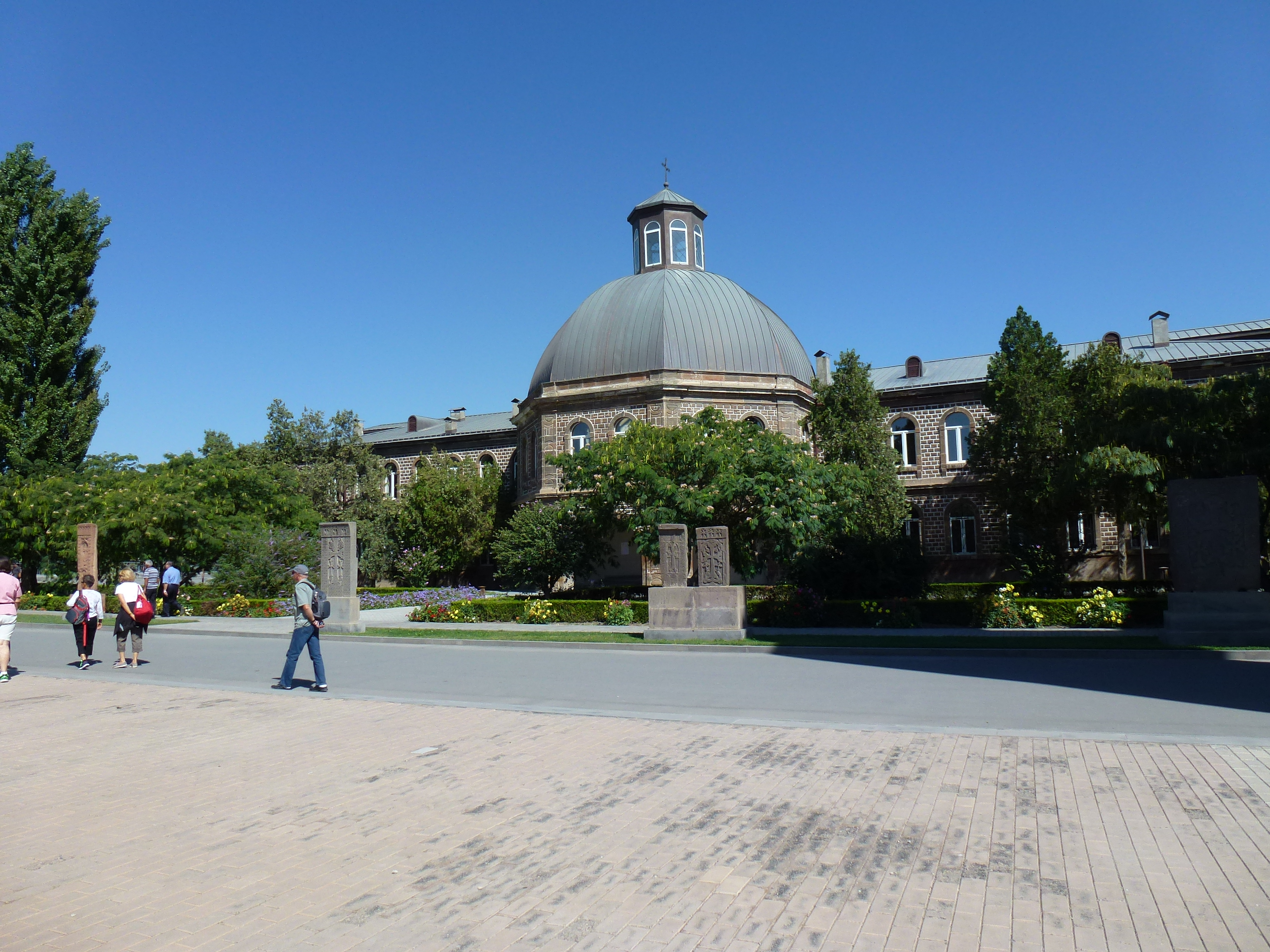
Gevorkian Seminary, opened in 1874

Gevorkian Theological Seminary is one of the most significant educational institutions of Armenia. Other educational institutions include the Grigor Lusavorich University and the intermediate college of vocational education.

The Karekin I Centre of Theology and Armenology is also functioning in the town since 2000.

As of 2009, Vagharshapat is home to 14 public secondary schools, 8 kindergartens and 2 musical academies.

The new complex of Eurnekian School of the Mother See was opened in September 2017.

== Sport ==
FC Vagharshapat was the town's only football club, made its debut in the Armenian Premier League as Zvartnots Echmiadzin in 1992. However, it was dissolved in early 2006 and is currently inactive from professional football. The Etchmiadzin Stadium located immediately to the south of the Mother See complex, is able to hold up to 3,000 spectators.

In October 2016, the Football Federation of Armenia has launched the construction of a football academy at the southern suburb of the town, on the Vagharshapat-Margara motorway. The groundbreaking ceremony took place on 12 April 2017, was attended by President Serzh Sargsyan, UEFA President Aleksander Čeferin and FFA President Ruben Hayrapetyan. With an approximate cost of US$2 million, the complex will occupy an area of 55,601 square metres (598,484 square feet) and is expected to be completed by October 2017. The project is being jointly financed by the FFA, UEFA and FIFA.

A new sport school is currently under construction in Vagharshapat since 2015, with a cost of more than US$1 million. The project is due to be completed in 2019.

The nearby village of Aknalich (10 km south of Vagharshapat) is famous for the Ara and Aytsemnik equestrian centre.

== International relations ==
Vagharshapat (Ejmiatsin) has been a member of the Organization of World Heritage Cities (OWHC) since 2007.

=== Twin towns – sister cities ===
Vagharshapat is twinned with:

- Fresno, United States (2009)
- Hadrut, Republic of Artsakh (2010–2020)
- Issy-les-Moulineaux, France (1989)
- Martakert, Republic of Artsakh (2010–2023)
- Petrozavodsk, Russia (2004)
- Sergiyev Posad, Russia (2010)
- Bethlehem, Palestine (2024)
- Székesfehérvár, Hungary (2025)

=== Friendly cities ===
Vagharshapat also cooperates with:

- Veliko Tarnovo, Bulgaria (2013)
- (Georgia (country)) Mtskheta, Georgia (2016)
- Almelo, Netherlands (2020)

== Notable people ==
- Zacharias II (?–1520), Catholicos of All Armenians 1515–1520
- Gregory XII (1498–1590), Catholicos of All Armenians 1576–1590
- David IV (?–1633), Catholicos of All Armenians 1590–1629
- Makar Yekmalyan (1856–1905), composer
- Hovhannes Hovhannisyan (1864–1929), poet
- Yeghishe Tadevosyan (1870–1936), artist, pedagogue
- Abraham Gyulkhandanyan (1875–1946), politician and historian
- Levon Manaseryan (1925), painter
- Aram Asatryan (1953–2006), singer
- Khoren Gevor (1980–), professional boxer
- Mihran Harutyunyan (1989-), wrestler, professional MMA fighter and Olympic Silver Medalist
- Andranik Karapetyan (1995-), European champion in weightlifting
- Arman Adikyan (1984-), Greco-Roman wrestler
- Siranush Andriasian (1986-), professional chess player and three time Armenian champion
- Sedrak Saroyan (1967–2022), general and MP
- Andranik Hakobyan, professional boxer
- Hamlet Manukyan, gymnast
- Anahit Mekhitarian, opera singer
- Haykaz Galstyan, Armenian Greco-Roman wrestler.
- Armen Melikyan, Armenian Greco-Roman wrestler.
- Narek Abgaryan, boxer
- Vahagn Militosyan, professional footballer
- Albert Mnatsakanyan, professional footballer
- Arthur Manukyan, director and producer
- Spiridon Melikyan, musicologist, composer, choirmaster, and teacher

== See also ==
- Armenian Apostolic Church
- Arsacid dynasty of Armenia
- Echmiadzin Gospels
- Mother See of Holy Etchmiadzin
- Vologases V
