= Şıxlar =

Şıxlar (Shykhlar) may refer to:

- Shikhlar, Armenia
- Şıxlar, Agdam, Azerbaijan
- Şıxlar, Baku, Azerbaijan
- Şıxlar, Gobustan, Azerbaijan
- Şıxlar, Goranboy, Azerbaijan
- Şıxlar, Goychay, Azerbaijan
- Şıxlar, Jabrayil, Azerbaijan
- Şıxlar, Jalilabad, Azerbaijan
- Şıxlar, Khachmaz, Azerbaijan
- Şıxlar, Khizi, Azerbaijan
- Şıxlar, Qakh, Azerbaijan
- Şıxlar, Sabirabad, Azerbaijan
- Şıxlar, Yardymli, Azerbaijan
