= Qımılqışlaq =

Qımılqışlaq or Kymylkyshlak or Kymylkyshlakh may refer to:

- Qımılqışlaq, Khachmaz, Azerbaijan
- Qımılqışlaq, Quba, Azerbaijan
