= Baba Samid Mausoleum =

Safavid era burial site in Azerbaijan

Baba Samid Mausoleum Baba Samid məqbərəsi
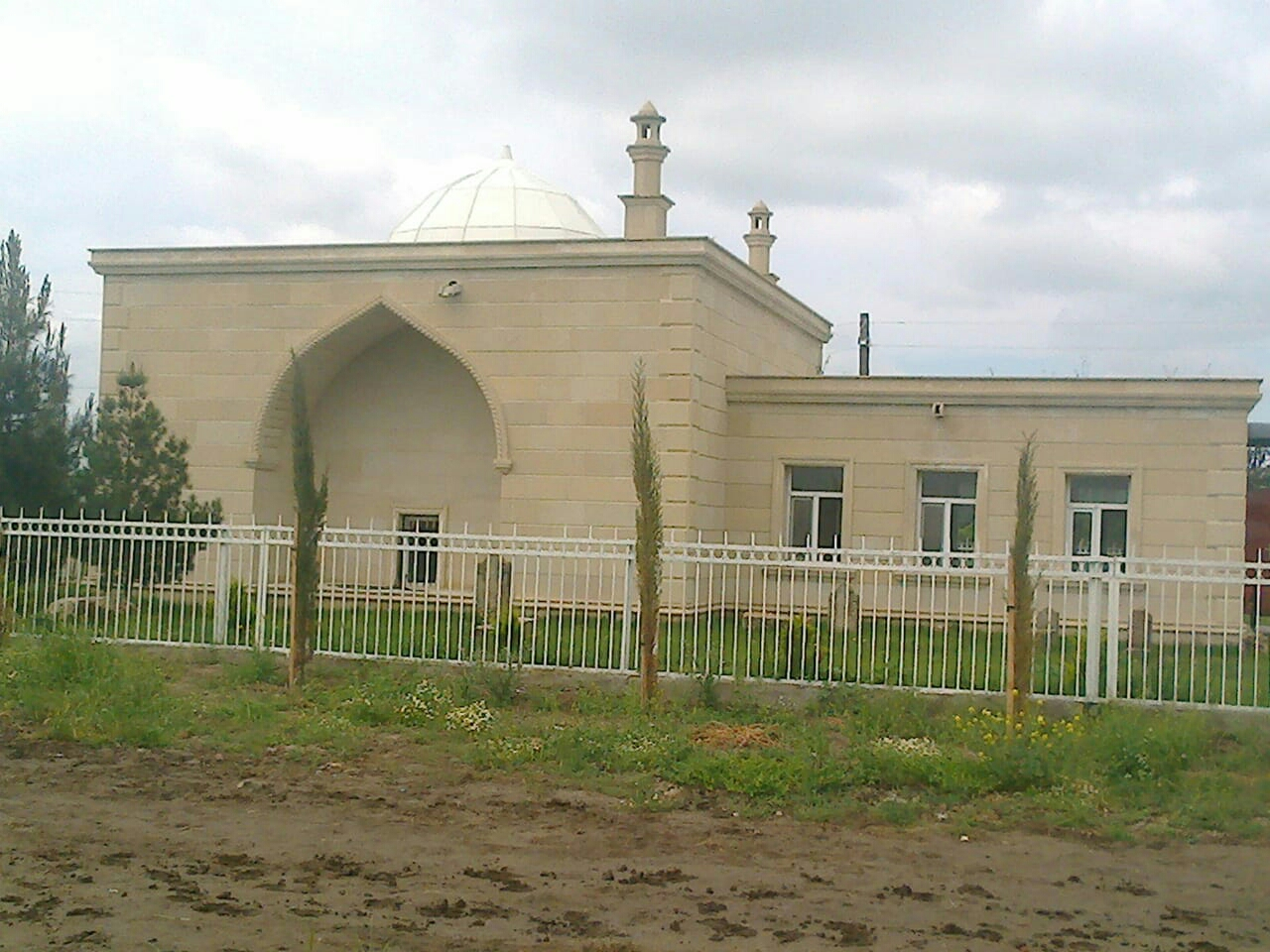

Religion
- Affiliation: Islam
- Region: Sabirabad District
- Ownership: Safavid Empire

Location
- Location: Shykhlyar
- Country: Azerbaijan
- Interactive map of Baba Samid Mausoleum; Baba Samid məqbərəsi
- Coordinates: 40°04′12″N 48°33′23″E

Architecture
- Style: Shirvan-Absheron architecture
- Established: 1585

Baba Samid Mausoleum (Azerbaijani: Baba Samid məqbərəsi) is a Safavid era tomb.

== History ==
The tomb is located on the side of the highway in Shykhlyar village of Sabirabad District. The first 3 lines of the 9-line inscription of Baba Samid Mausoleum written in Arabic and Persian contain Surah XIX, verses 31–32 from the Quran. Lines 4–5 praise Ali, and the other 4 lines day "It was built for the head of the Sayyids (here sayyid means "great"), the source of happiness Baba Samid ibn Bektash ibn Sultan Ali ibn Hadrat Musa Arriza" in the month of Dhu al-Qadah in 993 AH (1585 CE) by the order of Shirvan beylerbeyi Abdollah Khan Ustajlu during the reign of Safavid Shah I Tahmasib.

Baba Samid is a Shia sect of Sufis widespread in medieval Azerbaijan and Turkey.

== Graves ==
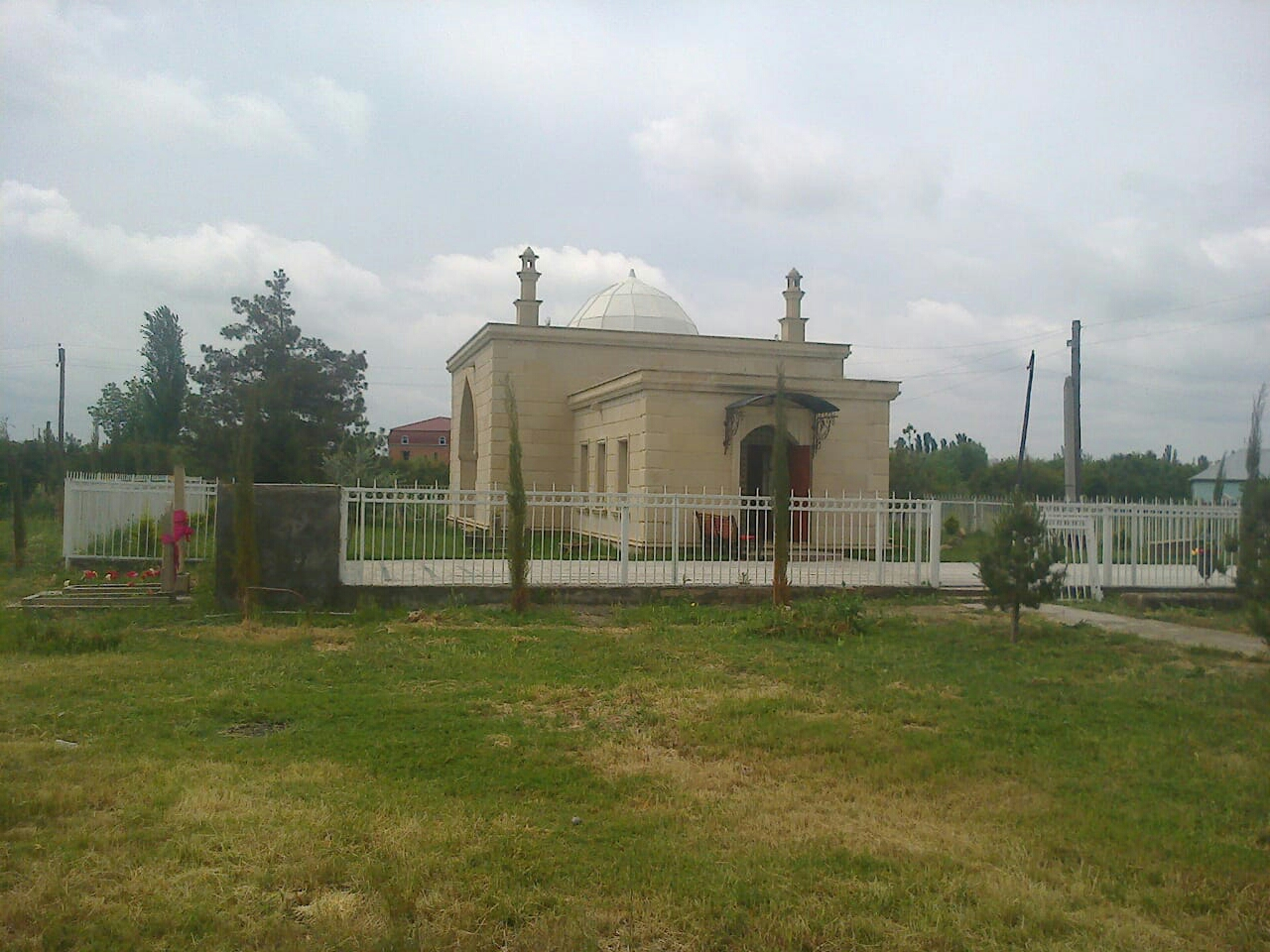

Some of Aghasi Khan's children (Ismail bey, Hashim Khan, Jafar bey, Abdulla bey, Mehdi bey), the khan of Shirvan, and his 3rd wife Khadijakhanum khanum were buried there.
