= Khor Virap =

Monastery in Armenia

- Խոր Վիրապ
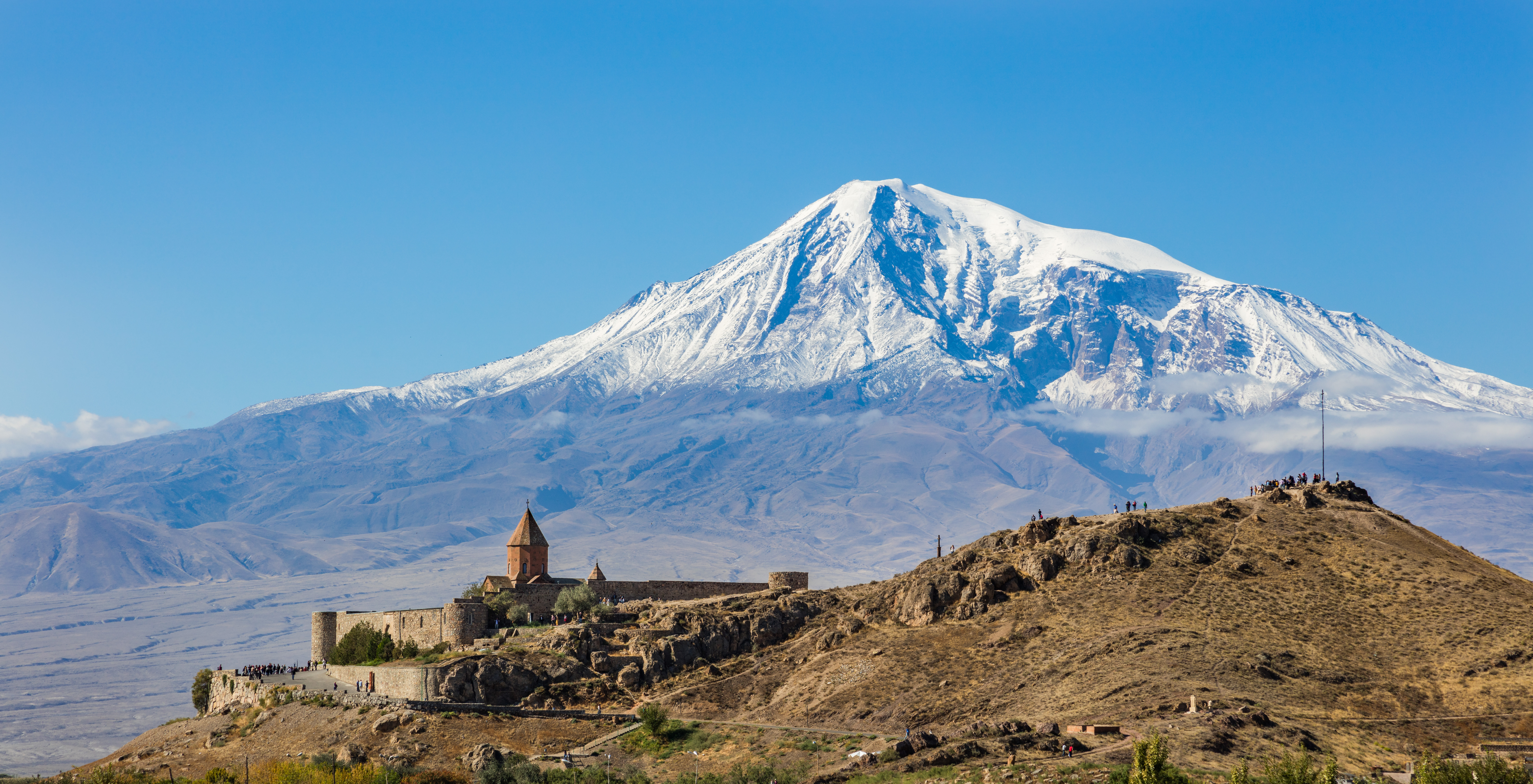
- Khor Virap with Mount Ararat in background

- Location within Armenia Location within Ararat

Religion
- Affiliation: Armenian Apostolic Church
- Rite: Armenian
- Ecclesiastical or organisational status: Good
- Status: functional

Location
- Location: near Lusarat, Ararat Province, Armenia
- Country: Armenia
- Coordinates: 39°52′42″N 44°34′34″E

Architecture
- Architect: Original chapel by Nerses III the Builder
- Style: Armenian
- Groundbreaking: 642 (original chapel), 1662 (current church)
- Completed: 17th century

Khor Virap (Armenian: Խոր Վիրապ, lit. 'deep dungeon') is an Armenian monastery located in the Ararat Plain in Armenia, near the border with Turkey, about 8 kilometres (5.0 mi) south of Artashat, Ararat Province, in the territory of ancient Artaxata. The monastery was host to a theological seminary and was the residence of the Catholicos, the head of the Armenian Church.

Khor Virap's notability as a monastery and pilgrimage site is attributed to the fact that Gregory the Illuminator (the patron saint of Armenia) was imprisoned there for 13 years by King Tiridates III of Armenia. Gregory subsequently became the king's religious mentor, and they led the Christian proselytizing activity in the country. In 301 Armenia was the first country in the world to declare itself a Christian nation. A chapel was initially built in 642 at the site of Khor Virap by Nerses III the Builder. Over the centuries it was repeatedly rebuilt. In 1662 the larger chapel known as the "St. Astvatsatsin" (Holy Mother of God) was built around the ruins of the old chapel, the monastery, the refectory and the cells of the monks. Regular services are held in the church., which is one of the most visited pilgrimage sites in Armenia.

== Etymology ==
The place of imprisonment "virap nerk'in", meaning the "bottommost pit", came to be known as the "virap" or "khor (deep) virap".

== Geography ==
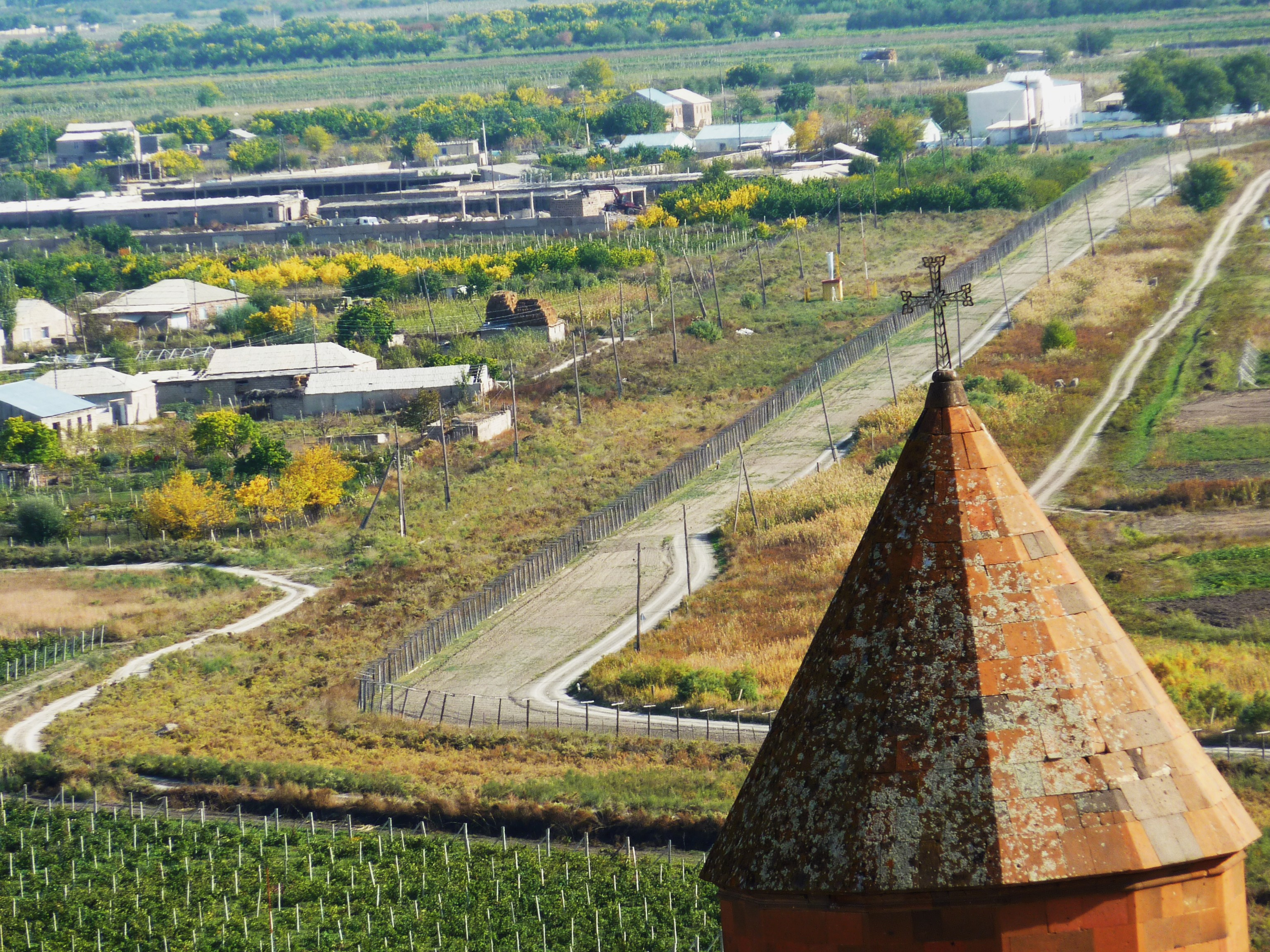
Fenced border with Turkey

Khor Virap is located on a hillock in Pokr Vedi; the village is 4 kilometres (2.5 mi) from the main highway. Yerevan, the capital and largest city of Armenia, is 30 kilometres (19 mi) to the north. It is situated about 100 metres (330 ft) away from the closed Turkish-Armenian border (sealed by barbed wire fencing) and defended by Russian military establishments that guard the border zone.

The monastery is surrounded by green pasture lands and vineyards within the Ararat plain and is in view of Mount Ararat. The Arax (or Aras) River flows close by, and the monastery is across from Aralık, Turkey.

== History ==
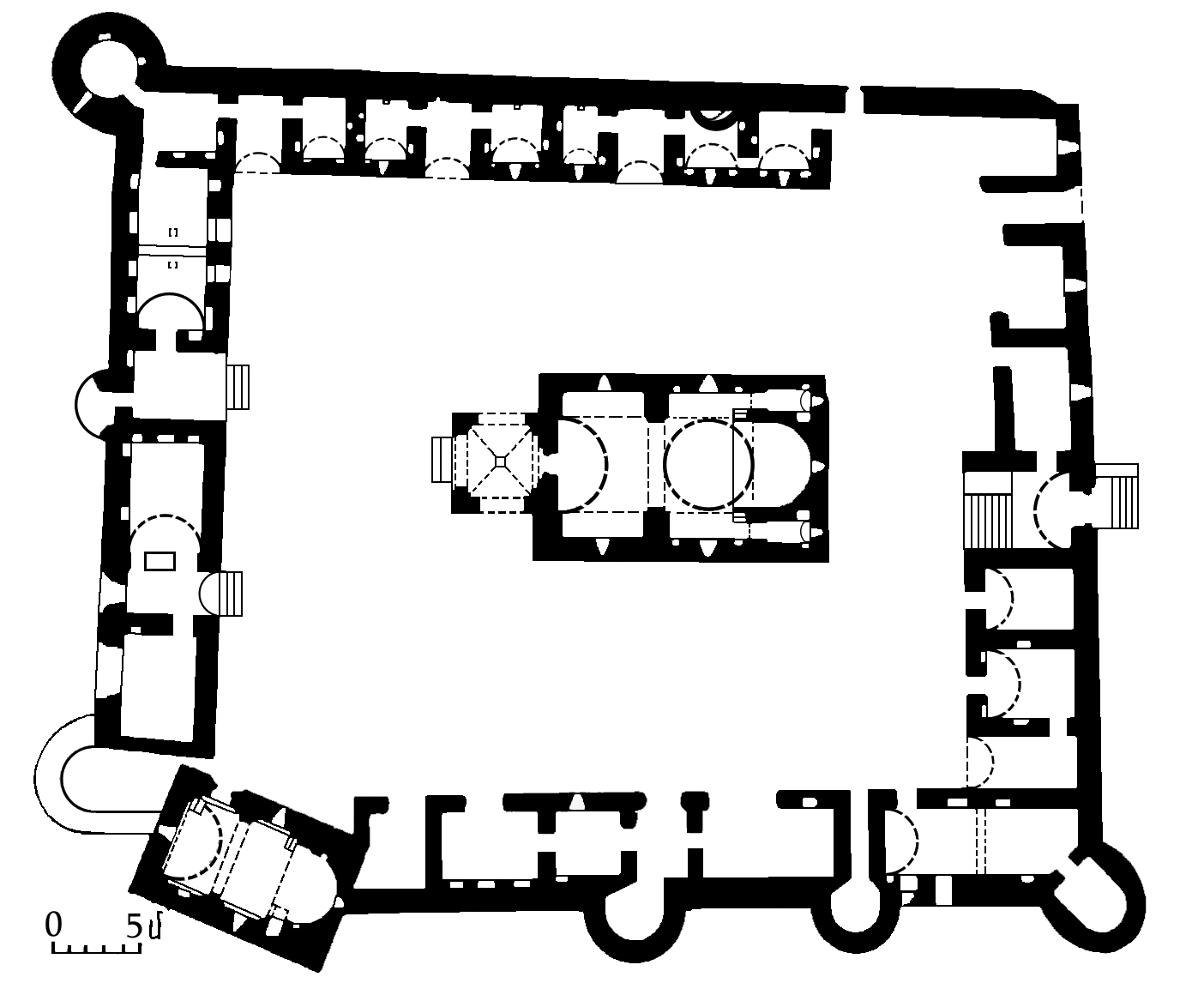
Plan of Khor Virap

King Artashes I, founder of the Artashesid dynasty, established his Armenian capital at Artashat (also known as Artaxtisata) around 180 BC. It is believed that Hannibal, the Carthaginian General who was persecuted by Rome, was also instrumental in establishing Artashat. Artashat remained the capital of the dynasty till the reign of King Khosrov III (330–339) when it was moved to Dvin. Subsequently, Artashat was destroyed by the Persian King Shapur II. Artashat is close to the hillock of Khor Virap. Until its chapel was built, Khor Virap was used as royal prison.

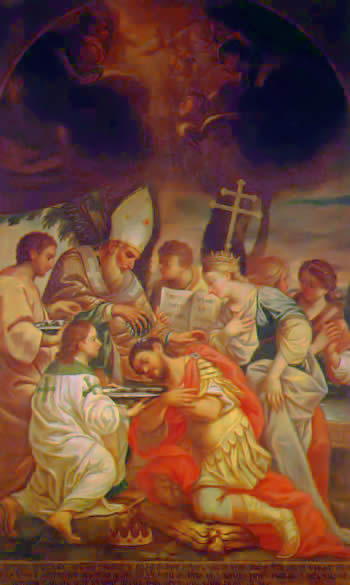
Baptism of Tiridates III by St. Gregory

When King Tiridates III ruled over Armenia, his assistant was the Christian Grigor (Gregory) Lusavorich who preached the Christian religion. However, Tiridates, a follower of pagan religion, was not pleased with having an advisor with a different religion, and he subjected Gregory to severe torture. When news reached the king that Gregory's father Anak the Parthian was responsible for the murder of the king's father, the king ordered that Gregory's hands and legs be tied and that he be thrown into the Khor Virap to die in the dark dungeon located in Artashat. In addition, Gregory's refusal to offer sacrifice to the goddess Anahita provoked the king to torture him and condemn him to imprisonment in the Khor Virap. He was then forgotten and the King waged wars and persecution among Christian minorities. However, Gregory did not die during his 13 years of imprisonment. His survival was attributed to a Christian widow from the local town who, under the influence of strange dream vision, regularly fed Gregory by dropping a loaf of freshly baked bread into the pit.

During this period, the Roman Emperor Diocletian wanted to marry a beautiful girl, and sent agents to search for the most beautiful woman. They found a girl named Hripsime in Rome, who was under the tutelage of Abbess Gayane in a Christian nunnery. When Rhipsime heard about the king's marriage proposal, she fled to Armenia to avoid the marriage. A search was launched to locate the girl and punish the people who had helped her escape, and eventually Tiridates located Rhipsime and forcibly brought her to his palace. After unsuccessfully trying to woo her, he ordered that she be dragged into his presence by putting a collar around her neck in hopes to persuade Rhipsime to agree to marry him.

However, what ensued was the persecution and murder of Rhipsime, Gaiane and many Christians. Tiridates went mad and is "said to have behaved like a wild boar while torments fell on his household and demons possessed the people of the city". It was then that Tiridates's sister, Khosrovidhukt, had a vision in the night, where an angel told her about the prisoner Gregory in the city of Artashat who could end the torments with the words "when he comes he will teach you the remedies for all your ills". People did not place much reliance on this vision, as most thought that Gregory had died within days of his being cast into the pit. But Khosrovidhukt had the same dream repeatedly, eventually threatened that if the dream's instructions were not followed, there would be dire consequences. Prince Awtay was deputed to get Gregory from Kirat Virap. He went to the pit and shouted to Gregory, saying "Gregory, if you are somewhere down there, come out. The God whom you worship has commanded that you be brought out". Gregory was brought out in a miserable state. He was taken to the king, who had gone mad "foraging among the pigs at Valarshapar", tearing his own skin. Gregory cured the king and brought him back to his senses. Gregory knew of all the atrocities committed, and saw the bodies of the martyrs who were later cremated. The king, accompanied by his court, approached Gregory, seeking forgiveness for all the sins they committed. Henceforth, Gregory started preaching Christianity to the king, his court, and his army.

King Tiridates, who had embraced Christianity as his religion following the miraculous cure effected by Gregory's divine intervention, proclaimed Christianity as the state religion of Armenia in 301 AD. Gregory became the Bishop of Caesarea and remained in service of the King until about 314 AD. Another version attributed to Tiridates's conversion to Christianity is that it was a strategic move to create national unity to checkmate the hegemony of Zoroastrian Persia and Pagan Rome, and since then, the Christian Church has acted as a strong influence in Armenia.

== Architecture ==
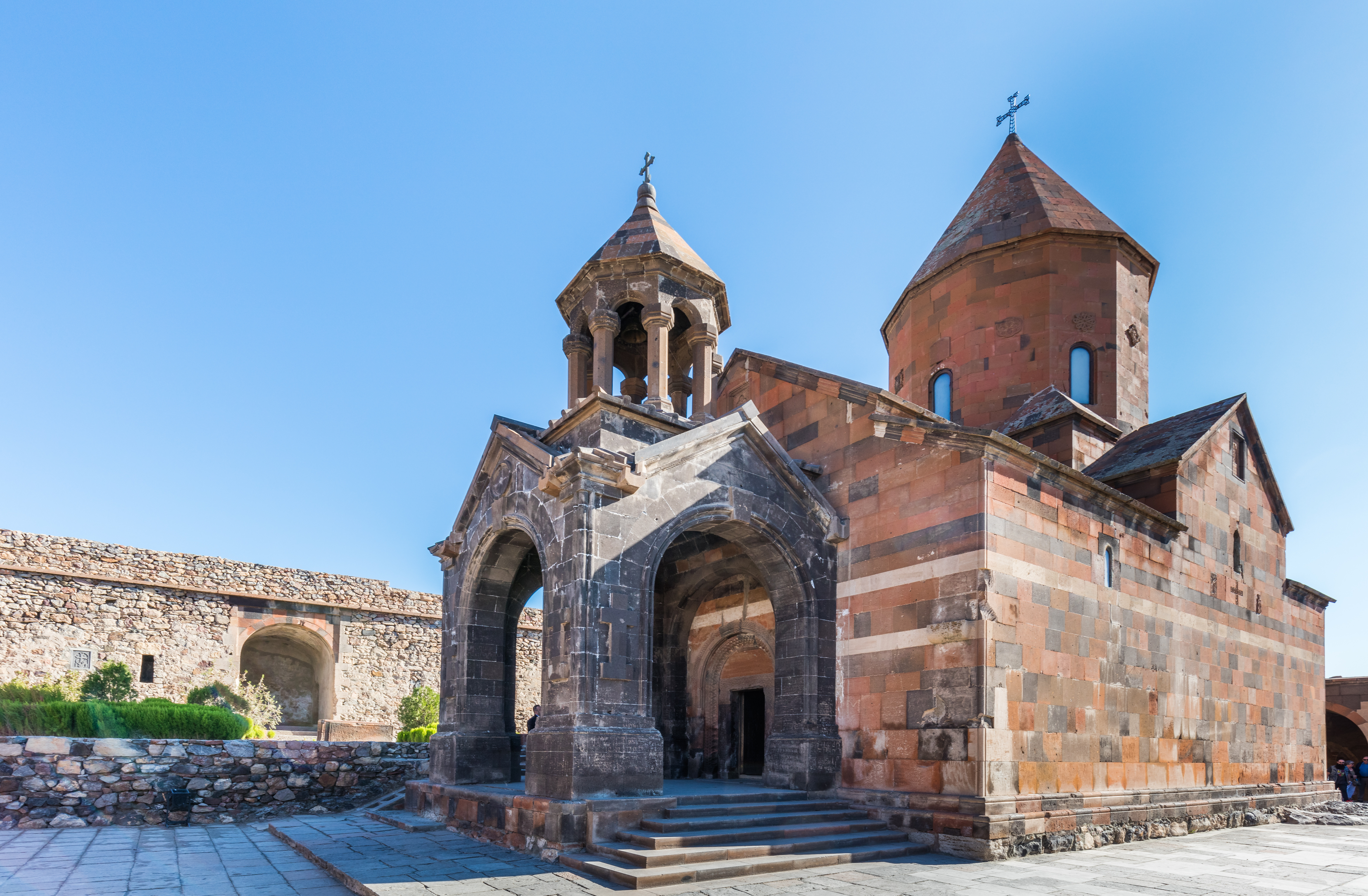
Church of the Holy Mother of God (Surb Astvatzatzin)

Church

The Nerses chapel, built in the 7th century around the famous pit, was of white limestone. Though plain in appearance, a monastery was built around a large enclosure that surrounds the ruins of the old chapel. This church, known as the Church of the Holy Mother of God (Surb Astvatzatzin), has a twelve-sided tholobate and dome and is dedicated to S. Astvatsatsin. The altar pulpit is well decorated. Though most Armenian churches have an east–west orientation, placing the altar at the east end, St. George Chapel (Surb Gevorg) is oriented northwest–southeast.

Pit

The pit where Gregory was imprisoned is southwest of the main church, underneath St. George Chapel which is a small basilica replete with a semicircular apse. Of the two pits inside the chapel, Grigor's is the farther one, 6 metres (20 ft) deep and 4.4 metres (14 ft) wide. The pit is approached through two unmarked holes. A small chamber, winding stairway, and a ladder lead to a small enclosure in the pit. To the right of the altar in the dungeon is the main room. A long ladder from here descends to a large cell of fairly good size, which was Grigor Lusavorich's prison cell. The climb down the well is to a depth of 60 metres (200 ft). The pit is well lit but the climb down the metal ladder requires sturdy shoes. It is also extremely humid down the pit in the summer months so be cautious and don't bring candles down as this adds to the heat.

== Grounds and surroundings ==
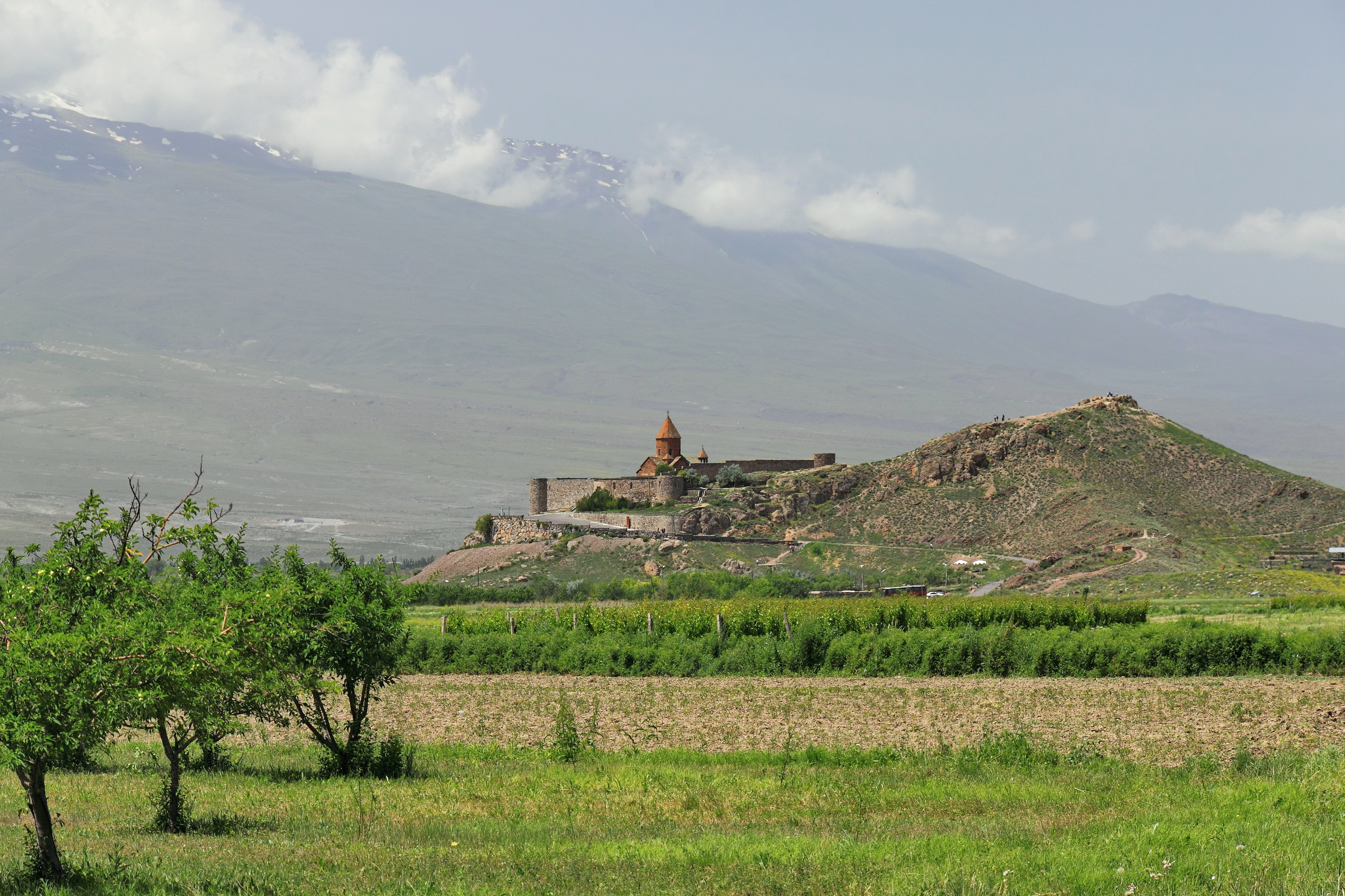
The monastery and the surrounding vineyards

The 17th century church built around the pit is a simple structure surrounding a large courtyard which looks like a fort complex. In his 1876 book John Buchan Telfer wrote: "the old Monastery of Khorvyrab surrounded by a wall, and looking very much like some old feudal castle."

Archaeological sites were excavated starting in 1970 in the thirteen hills (maximum height 70 metres (230 ft)) around Khor Virap and up to the valley of the river. Excavations in hills 1 and 4, and sections of hills 5, 7 and 8 and of the neck of the land between Hills 1 and 2 are in progress. Some archaeological excavations have also been carried out outside the walls of the church at the site of Artashat, the capital of the Tiridat dynasty. In addition to ancient coins and potshards, excavations have unearthed well preserved mud-brick fortifications on the northern slope of the third hill from the northeast.

== Culture ==
Celebration

The anniversary of the deliverance of Gregory is also celebrated in the Illuminator's cathedral built in Yerevan. On New Year's Day, light is brought from Khor Virap as a religious celebration. In a recent event, Catholicos Garegin II climbed down the same deep prison pit where the first Catholicos Grigor had passed many agonizing years, and came out of the pit by holding a lighted candle as symbol of the light that illuminated Armenians several centuries ago. As a pilgrimage centre, people visit Khor Virap for baptism or subsequent to a wedding to perform a matagh animal sacrifice.

Tourism

The monastery attracts a very large number of tourists, and there are a number of souvenir kiosks here. Of interest for visitors is the releasing of doves from Khor Virap, with the hope they will fly to Mount Ararat.

In the mid-1990s, young volunteers for the Canadian Youth Mission to Armenia (CYMA) helped renovate/restore the cathedral.

== Notable visitors ==
Early European visitors to Khor Virap included Joseph Pitton de Tournefort (c. 1700), James Bryce (1876), and H. F. B. Lynch (1893).

Recent visitors have included, among others, Pope Francis (2016) and Charles Michel, president of the European Council (2021).

== Gallery ==
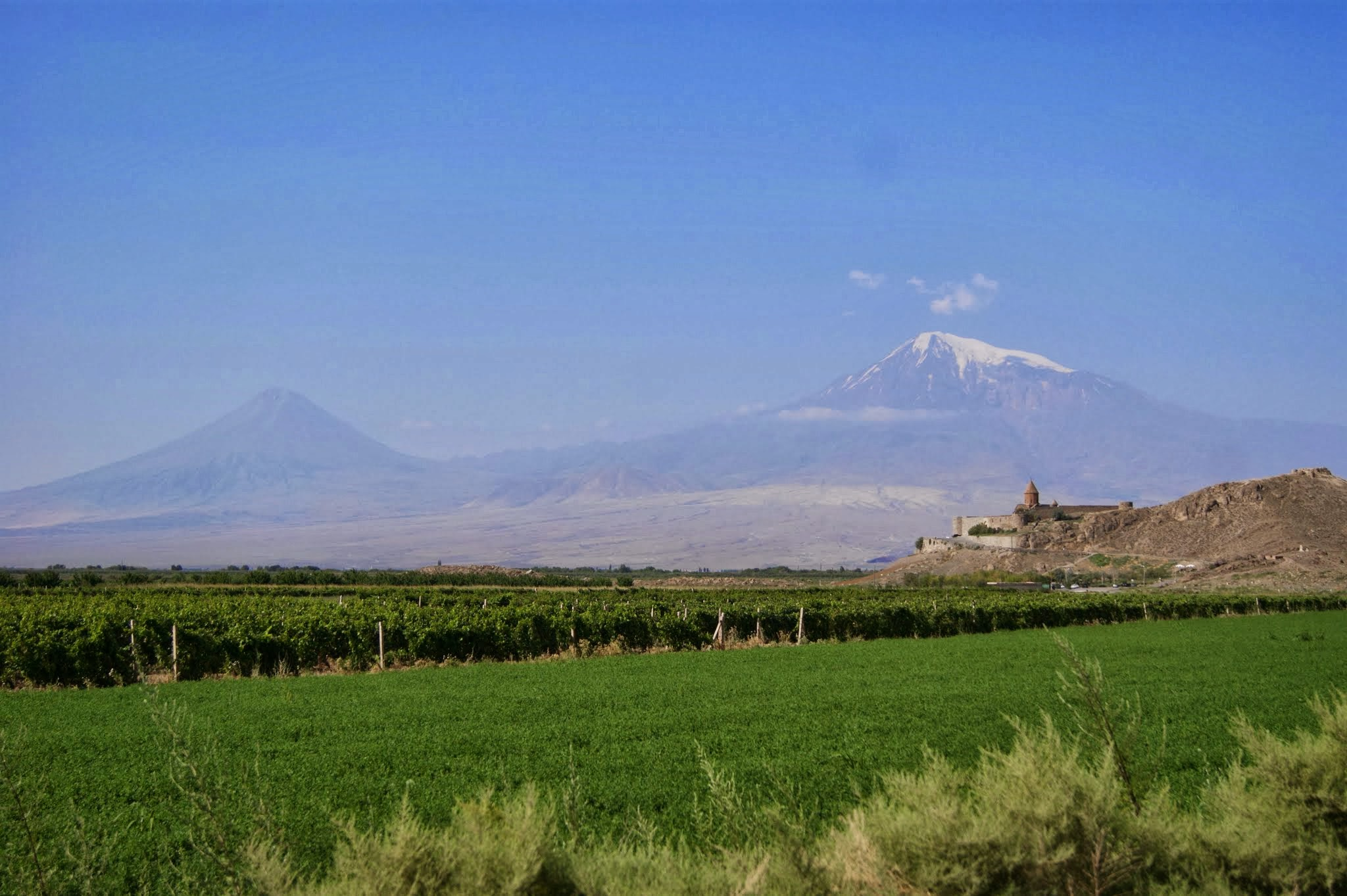

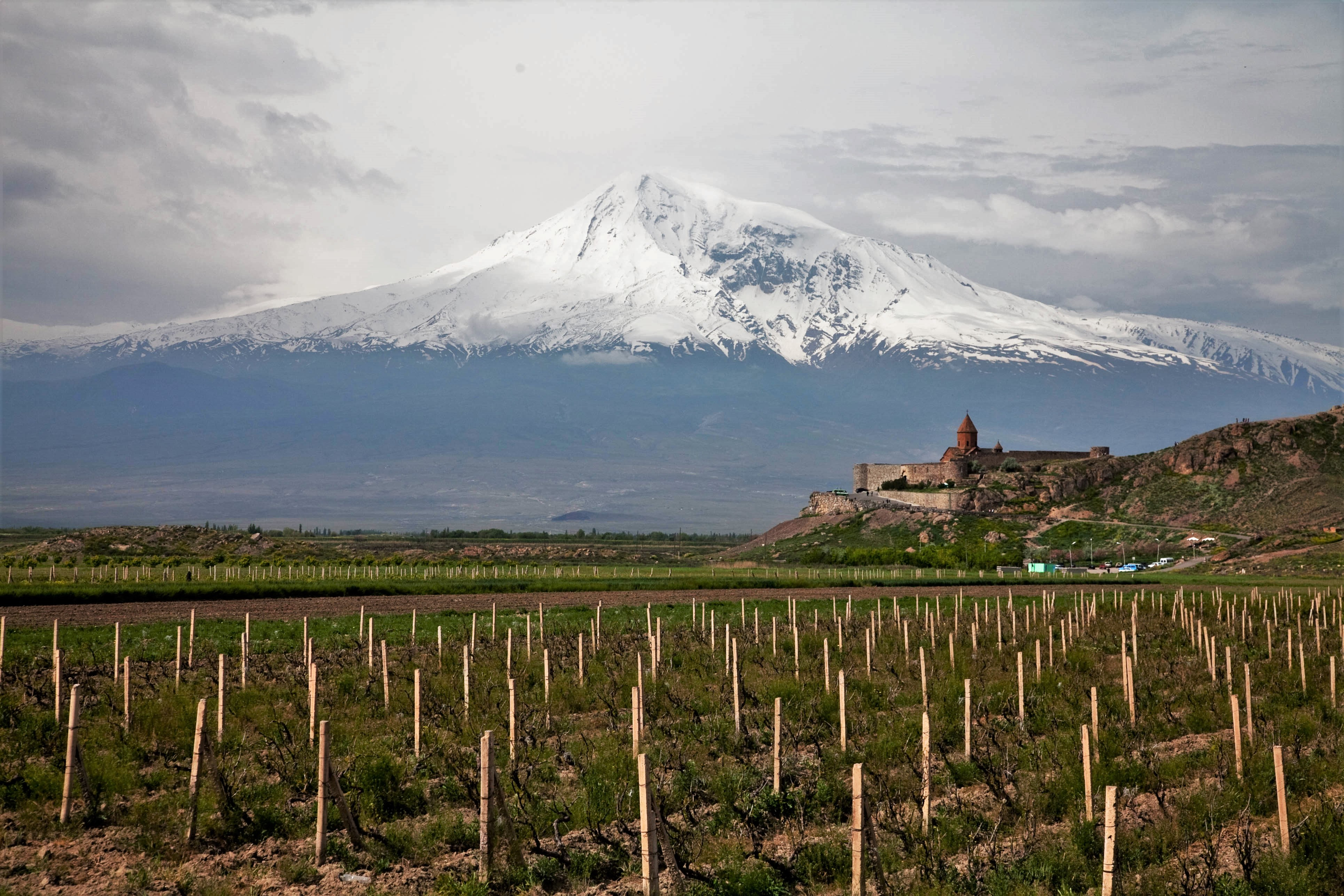

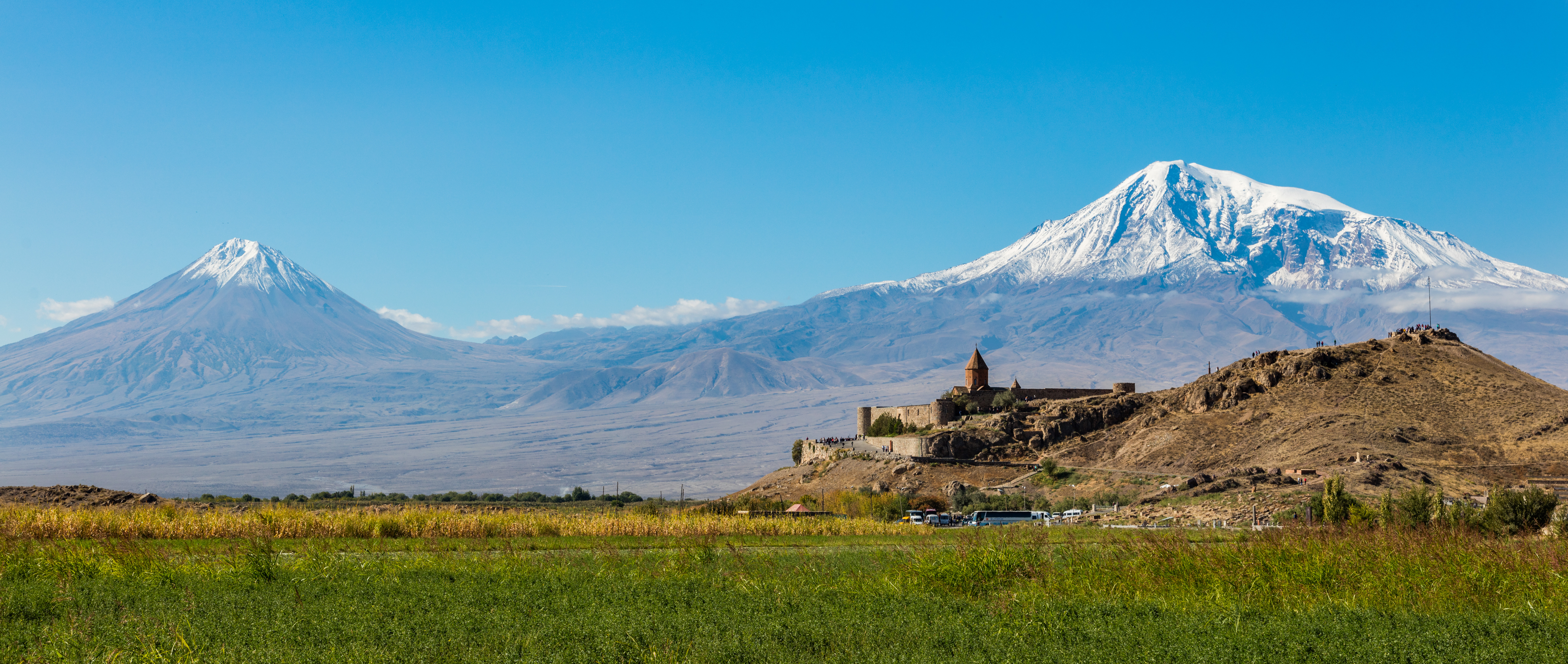

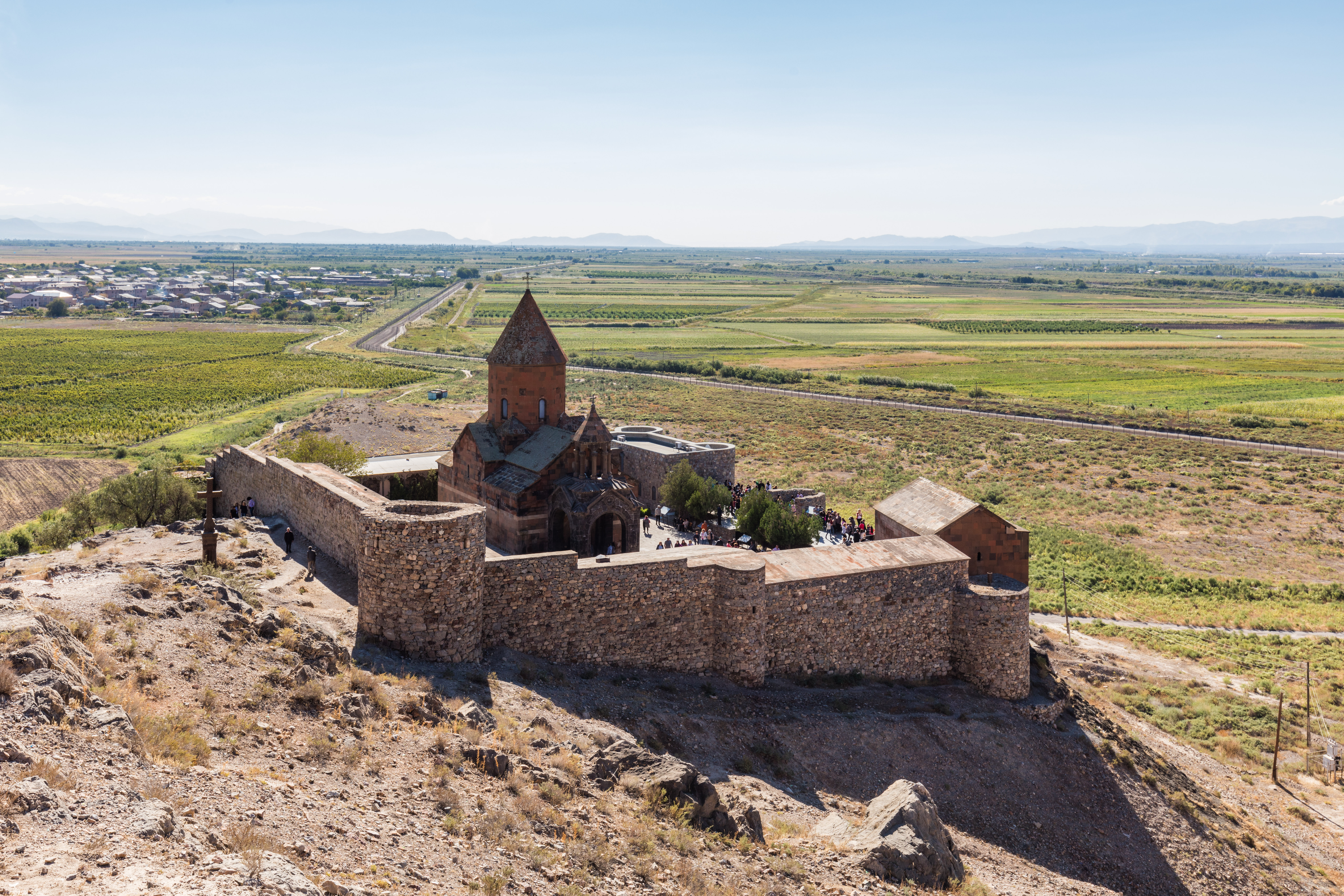

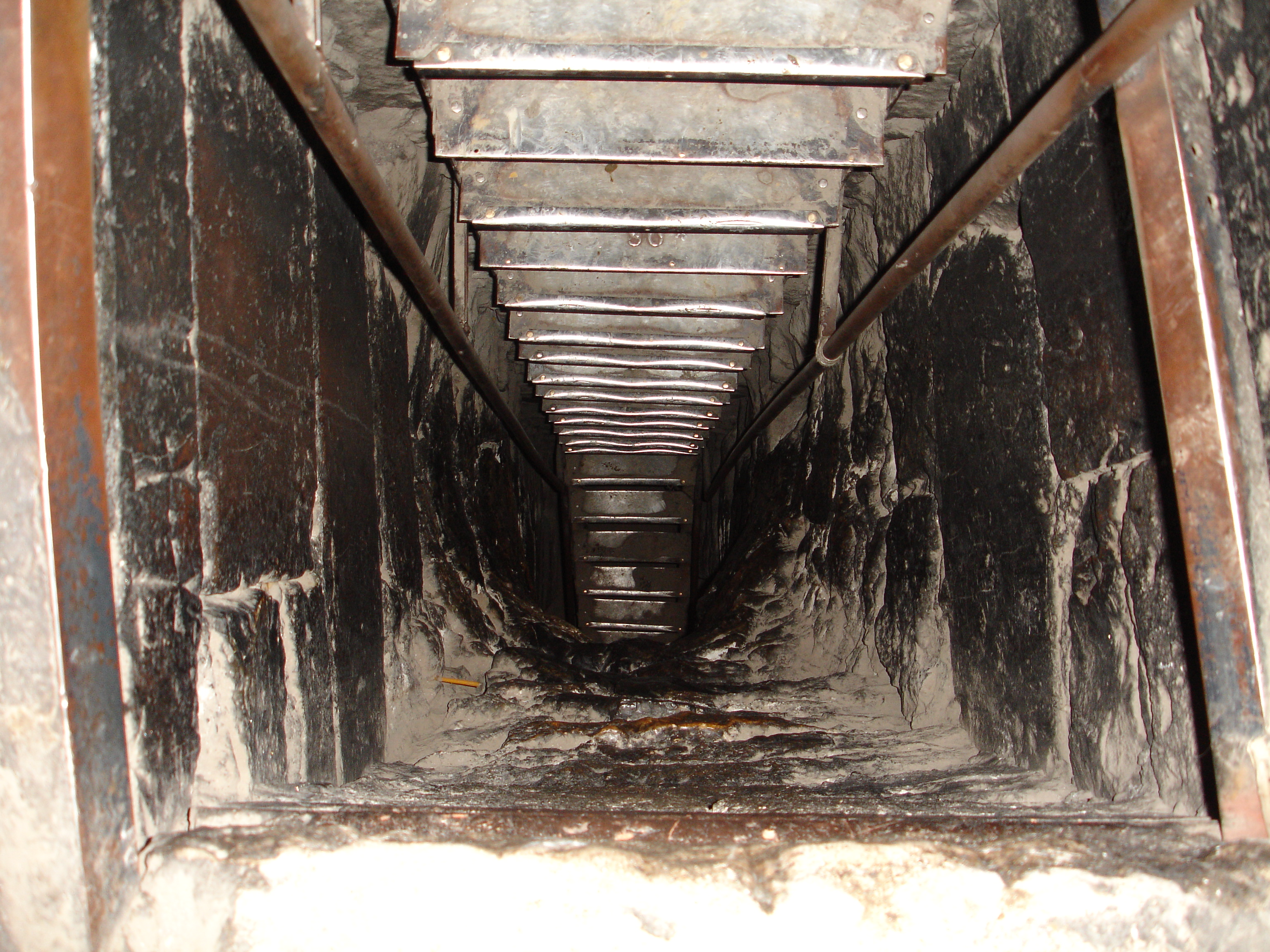
Underground entrance to Khor Virap (the pit)

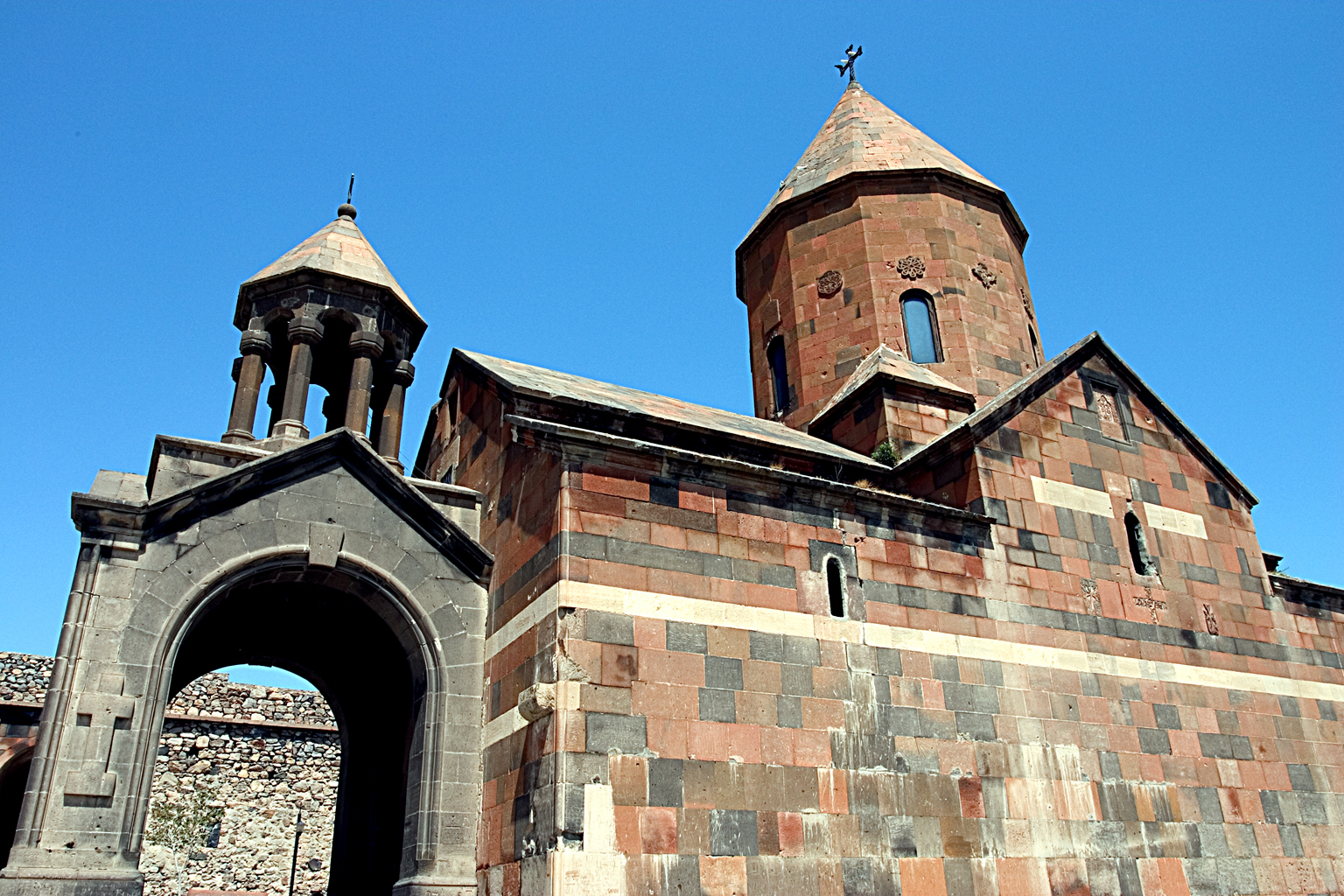
Surb Astvatzatzin

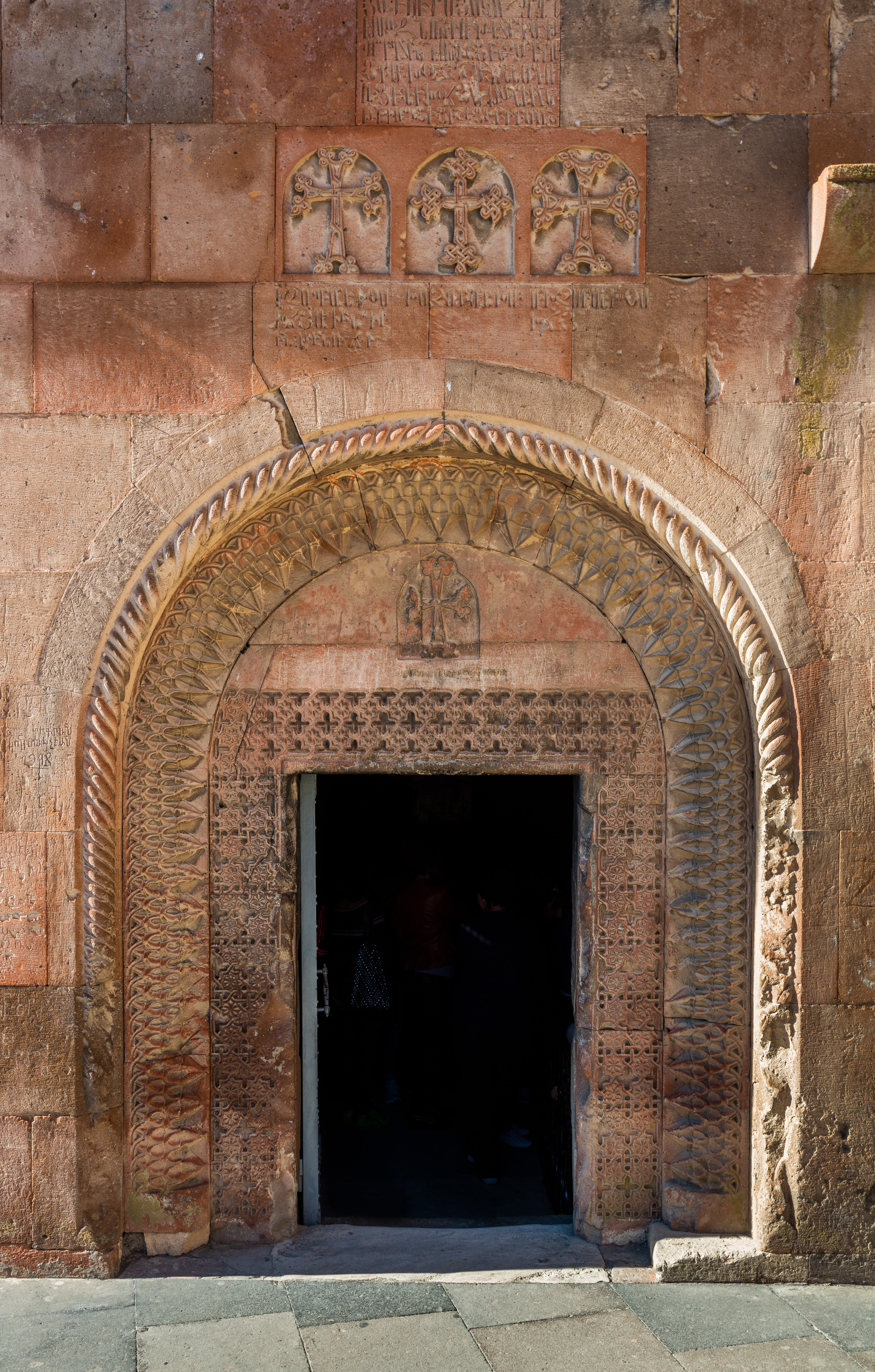
Entrance

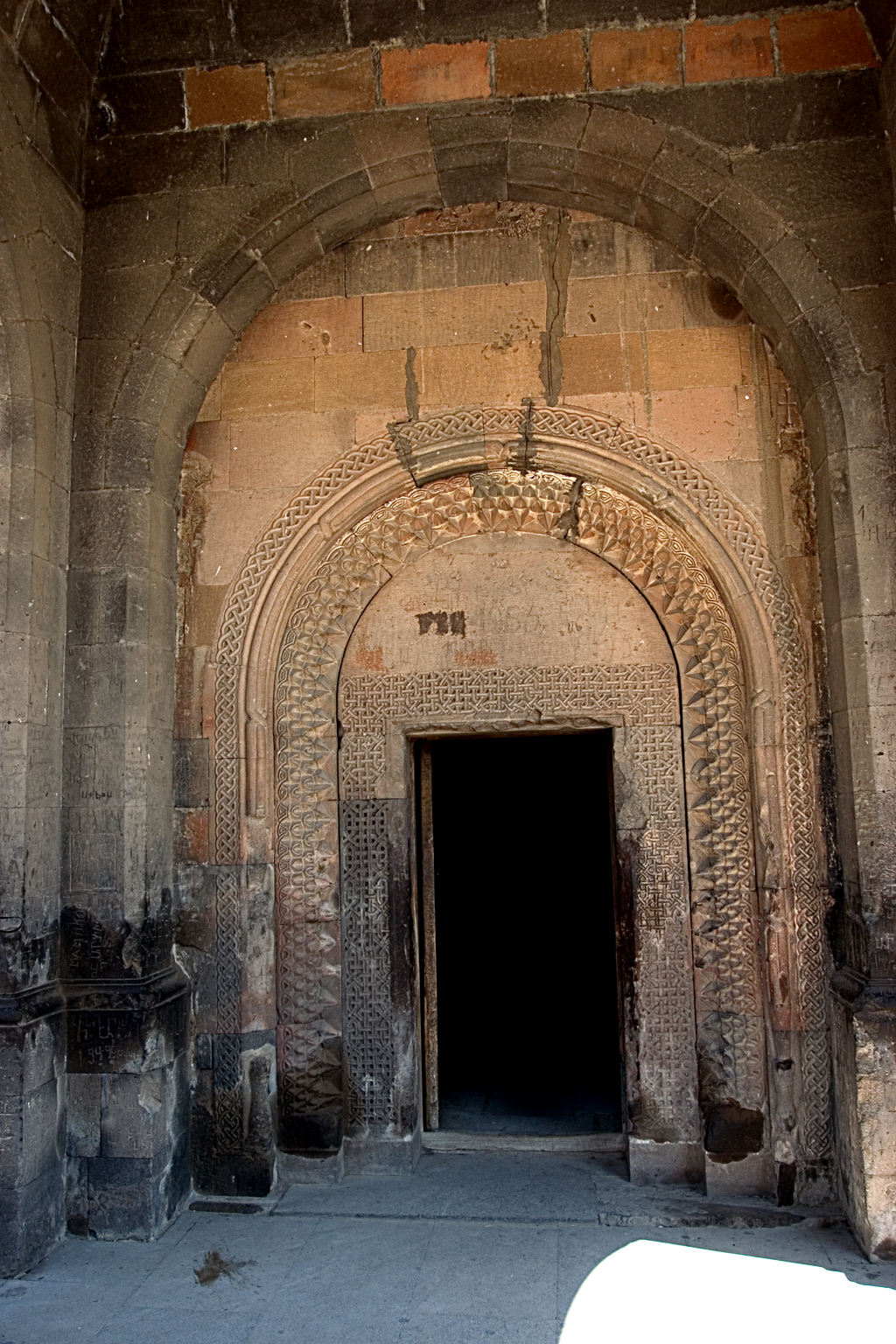
Portal to the cellar of Khor Virap (deep pit) where Gregory was thrown into

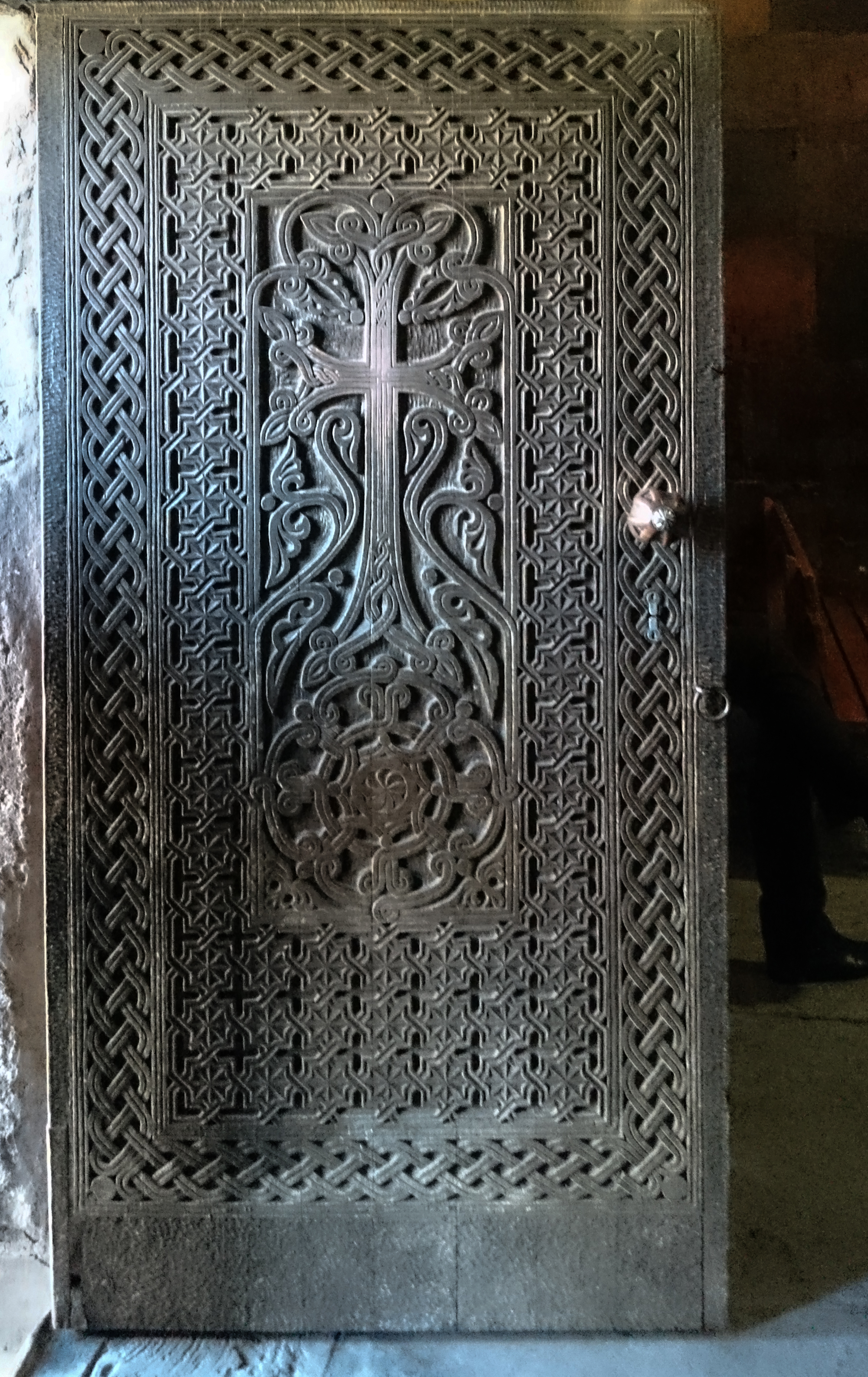
Wood carving on door

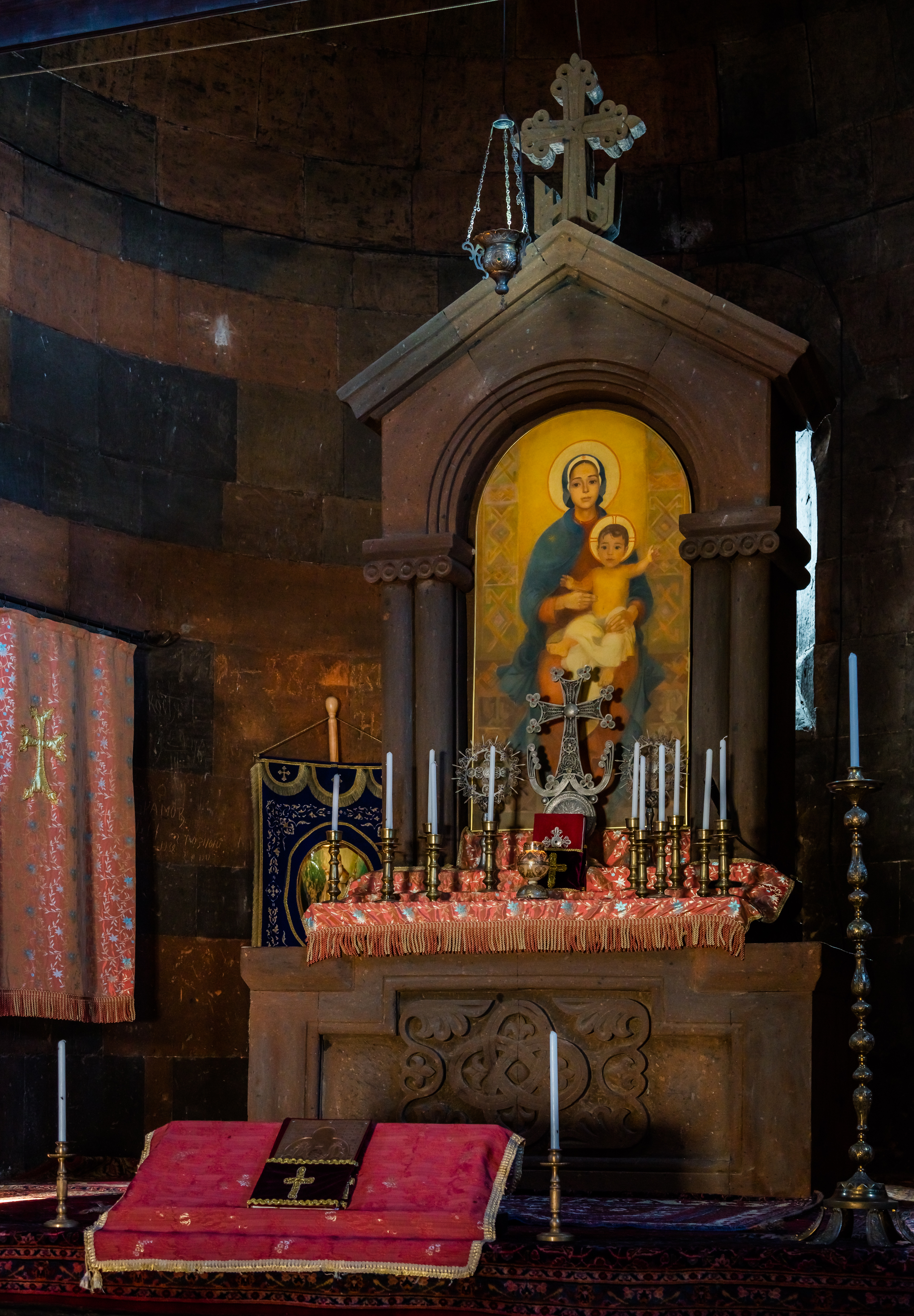
Church interior

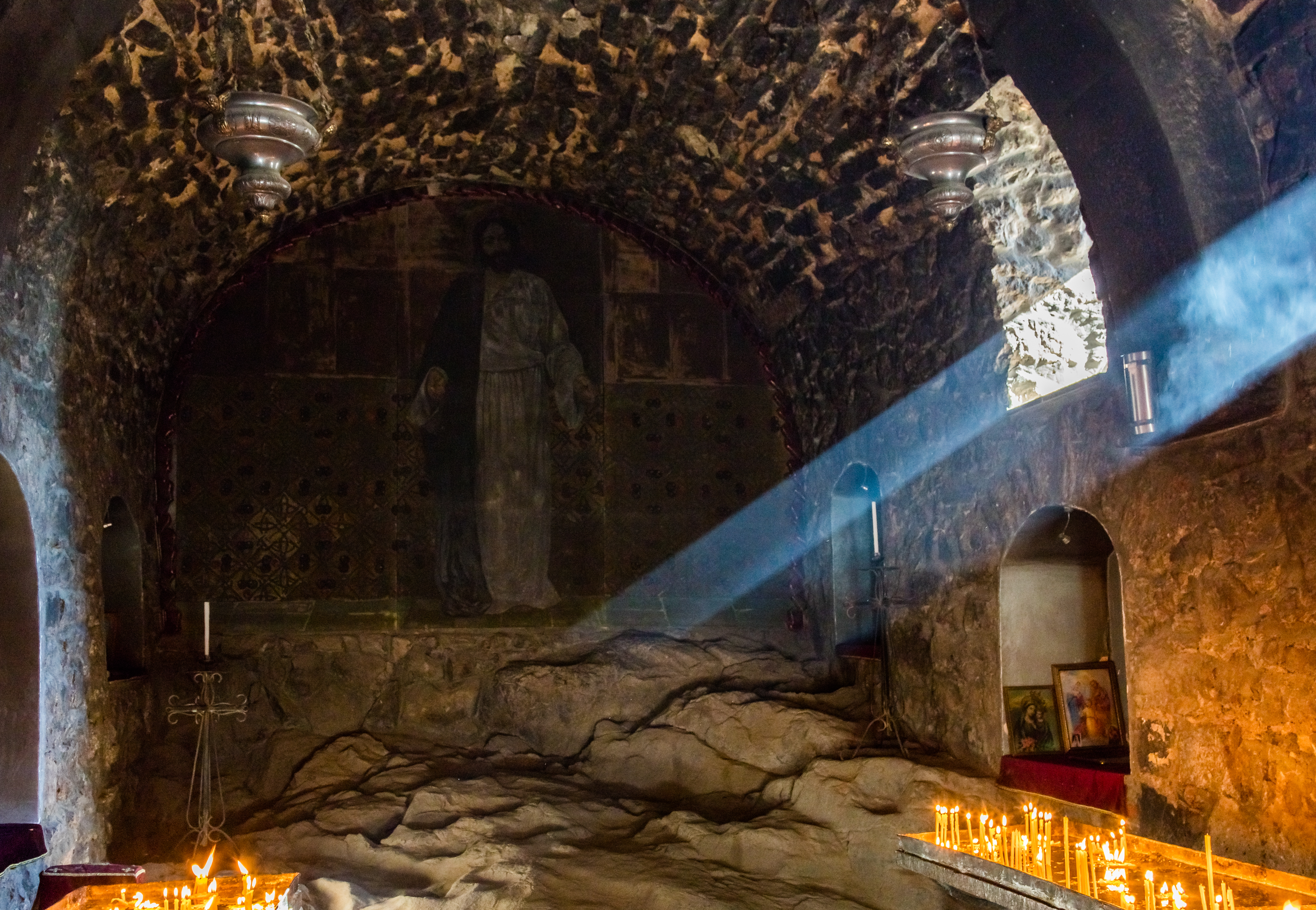
Prayer room

== Bibliography ==
- John Noble; Michael Kohn; Danielle Systermans (1 May 2008). Georgia, Armenia and Azerbaijan. Lonely Planet. ISBN 978-1-74104-477-5.
