= Shikh Baba Mausoleum =

Part of a cemetery in Shykhlar, Azerbaijan

Shikh Baba Mausoleum Şıx Baba türbəsi
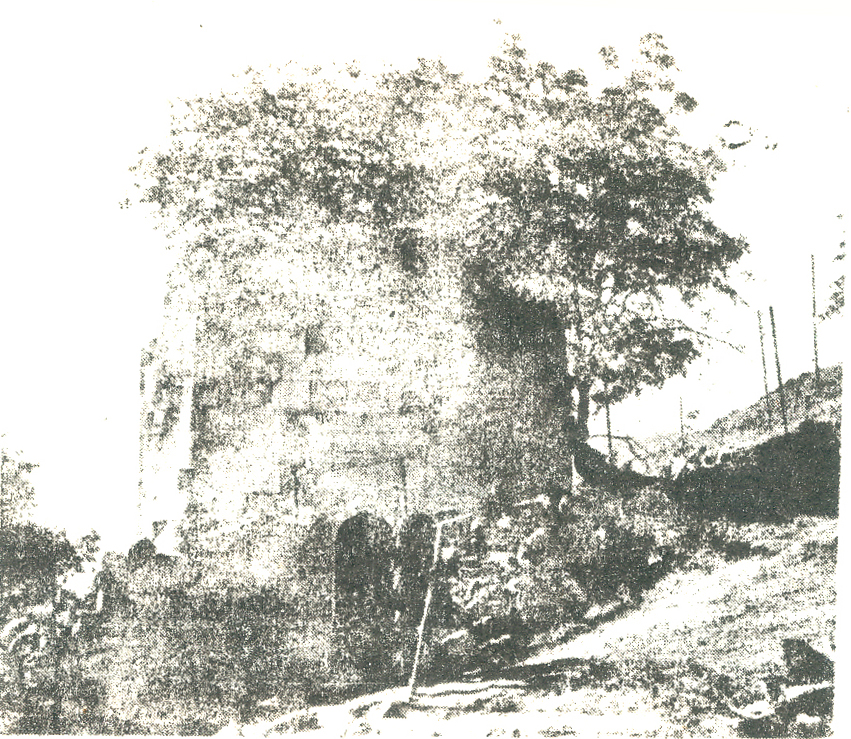

Religion
- District: Jabrayil District

Location
- Location: Shykhlar
- Country: Azerbaijan

Architecture
- Established: XIV century

Shikh Baba Mausoleum (Azerbaijani: Şıx Baba türbəsi) is a sanctuary in the territory of Shykhlar village in Jabrayil District, which is popularly known as "Shikh Baba Piri".

== About ==
Surrounded by a large cemetery, Shikh Baba Piri consists mainly of a tomb building with a circular plan inside and out. There is no inscription on the arched doorway. The inscription of 1308 shows that the tomb belongs to the grave of Sheikh Giyasaddinli oglu Sheikh Abdulsalman, the sheikh of the "Gadiriyya" society in Karabakh. It has the same meaning as the name of "Shikh Baba" sanctuary in Hamzali village of Qabala District. The tomb of Shikh Baba dates back to the 14th century. Shykhlar village, where the sanctuary is located, is also named after the Shikh Baba Mausoleum.

== Architecture ==
Stone fragments spilled from the dome and from various other monuments have been collected on the tomb of the sheikh. Examination of its inscription among the stone piles did not yield any results.

=== The entrance to the mausoleum ===
Upon entering the mausoleum, you have to go through a tombstone (0.65 × 0.16 × 0.18 m) inscribed with a beautiful sulus element naskh script. There is no name in the inscription on the stone, but the date is written. The translation of the Arabic text: "Worshiped month of Rajab, seven hundred and seventh year (27.XII.1307–26.I.1308)"

It can be assumed that the monument belongs to the person buried on the threshold of the tomb of the sheikh. As the name is not written, it is possible that the person buried was a woman. The headstone (0.59 × 27 m) with the same text is also on one of the graves outside the fence surrounding the tomb. The point of the inner border of the headstone, which is completed with a pointed arch, is completed with floral ornaments. The text of the inscription, written in Arabic with a large sulus element naskh script inside the border: "Rajab (month), seven hundred and seventh year (27.XII.1307–26.I.1308)"

The lower part of the stone monument (0.50 × 0.16 × 0.16 m) is rectangular and square. Both sides are empty. The translation of the inscription in Persian on the other two sides: "Death of Abdurrahman b. Sheikh Hussein b... I knew that my destiny was my nature, and it was very deceitful"

The tomb is surrounded by a rectangular fence made of baked bricks. At present, only a small part of the entrance to this fence remains. The upper part of the headstone is octagonal. The translation of the inscription in Arabic, written on the obverse with the sulus element naskh script: "He drank from the fountain of knowledge. This grave belongs to the compassionate Sheikh Abdulsalam, the son of Sheikh Giyasaddin. He died on August 27, 1358, in the year seven hundred and fifty-nine of twenty Ramadan"

=== The surrounding cemetery ===
There is no date in another tombstone built inside the fence. However, due to the shape, size and linear nature of the inscription, it can be attributed to the period of the previous ones. The words "Death of Sheikh Mahiyaddin" are written in a large written inscription. It's written in Arabic on a small piece of headstone (0.36 × 0.21 m) found in the stone piles on the tomb of the sheikh: "This tomb belongs to Sheikh Akbar."

Tombstones of sheikhs and sheikh saints of the XIV–XX centuries can be found in the nearby large cemetery. However, almost all medieval monuments are under the ground. It is impossible to dig them out. A headstone (0.57 × 0.32 × 0.11 m) that we removed from the ground is rectangular in shape. The line is not so neat. The text of the inscription written in Arabic: "Turab khan moved from this wedding house to the house of life? May God Almighty enlighten his grave, in the blessed month of Shawwal, in the seven hundred and fifty-third year (10.XI–9.XII.1352)"

Three more 15th century headstones (0.60 × 0.30 × 0.7 m) have been recorded. These are small monuments belonging to women, built in the form of three wings from above. Large volumes of them were also found in the cemetery of Old Avarag, Unaj village of Yardimli region in the middle of the XIV century.

=== Current situation ===
The Shikh Baba Mausoleum in the Shykhlar village of the Jabrayil District, which was liberated after 27 years, has not been demolished, although it is in a neglected condition.
