= Mirzəməmmədqışlaq =

- Location within Azerbaijan
- Coordinates: 41°22′36″N 48°42′21″E
- Country: Azerbaijan
- Rayon: Khachmaz
- Municipality: Qımılqışlaq
- Time zone: UTC+4 (AZT)
  - Summer (DST): UTC+5 (AZT)

Mirzəməmmədqışlaq (also, Mirzamamedkyshlak and Mirzamamedkyshlakh) is a village in the Khachmaz Rayon of Azerbaijan. The village forms part of the municipality of Qımılqışlaq.
