= Xilmilli =

- Municipality
- Location within Azerbaijan
- Coordinates: 40°41′31″N 48°51′49″E
- Country: Azerbaijan
- Rayon: Gobustan

Population
  - Total: 1,743
- Time zone: UTC+4 (AZT)
  - Summer (DST): UTC+5 (AZT)

Xilmilli (also, Khil’mili, Khil’milli, and Khilmih) is a village and municipality in the Gobustan Rayon of Azerbaijan. It has a population of 1,743. The municipality consists of the villages of Xilmilli and Şıxlar.
