= Şıxlar, Jalilabad =

Şıxlar
- Municipality
- Location within Azerbaijan
- Coordinates: 39°05′10″N 48°32′46″E
- Country: Azerbaijan
- Rayon: Jalilabad

Population
  - Total: 508
- Time zone: UTC+4 (AZT)
  - Summer (DST): UTC+5 (AZT)

Şıxlar (also, Shykhlyar and Shikhlyar) is a village and municipality in the Jalilabad Rayon of Azerbaijan. It has a population of 508.
