= Şıxlar, Jabrayil =

Şıxlar
- Location within Azerbaijan
- Coordinates: 39°26′20″N 46°51′49″E
- Country: Azerbaijan
- Rayon: Jabrayil
- Time zone: UTC+4 (AZT)
  - Summer (DST): UTC+5 (AZT)

Şıxlar (also Shykhlar and Shykhlyar) is a village in the Jabrayil Rayon of Azerbaijan.

== Architecture ==
- Shikh Baba Mausoleum
