= Şıxlar, Agdam =

Shykhlar
- Azerbaijani: Şıxlar
- Location within Azerbaijan Location within Karabakh Economic Region
- Coordinates: 40°09′12″N 47°01′59″E
- Country: Azerbaijan
- District: Aghdam
- Time zone: UTC+4 (AZT)
  - Summer (DST): UTC+5 (AZT)

Şıxlar (also known as Shykhlar) is a village in the Aghdam District of Azerbaijan.
