= Şıxlar, Khachmaz =

Şıxlar
- Location within Azerbaijan
- Coordinates: 41°28′55″N 48°41′00″E
- Country: Azerbaijan
- Rayon: Khachmaz
- Municipality: Qımılqışlaq
- Time zone: UTC+4 (AZT)
  - Summer (DST): UTC+5 (AZT)

Şıxlar (also, Shykhlar and Shykhlyar) is a village in the Khachmaz Rayon of Azerbaijan. The village forms part of the municipality of Qımılqışlaq.
