= Şıxlar, Goranboy =

Şıxlar
- Municipality
- Location within Azerbaijan
- Coordinates: 40°43′N 46°44′E
- Country: Azerbaijan
- Rayon: Goranboy

Population
  - Total: 253
- Time zone: UTC+4 (AZT)
  - Summer (DST): UTC+5 (AZT)

Şıxlar (also, Shykhlyar) is a village and municipality in the Goranboy Rayon of Azerbaijan. It has a population of 253.
