= Lusarat =

Lusarat Լուսառատ
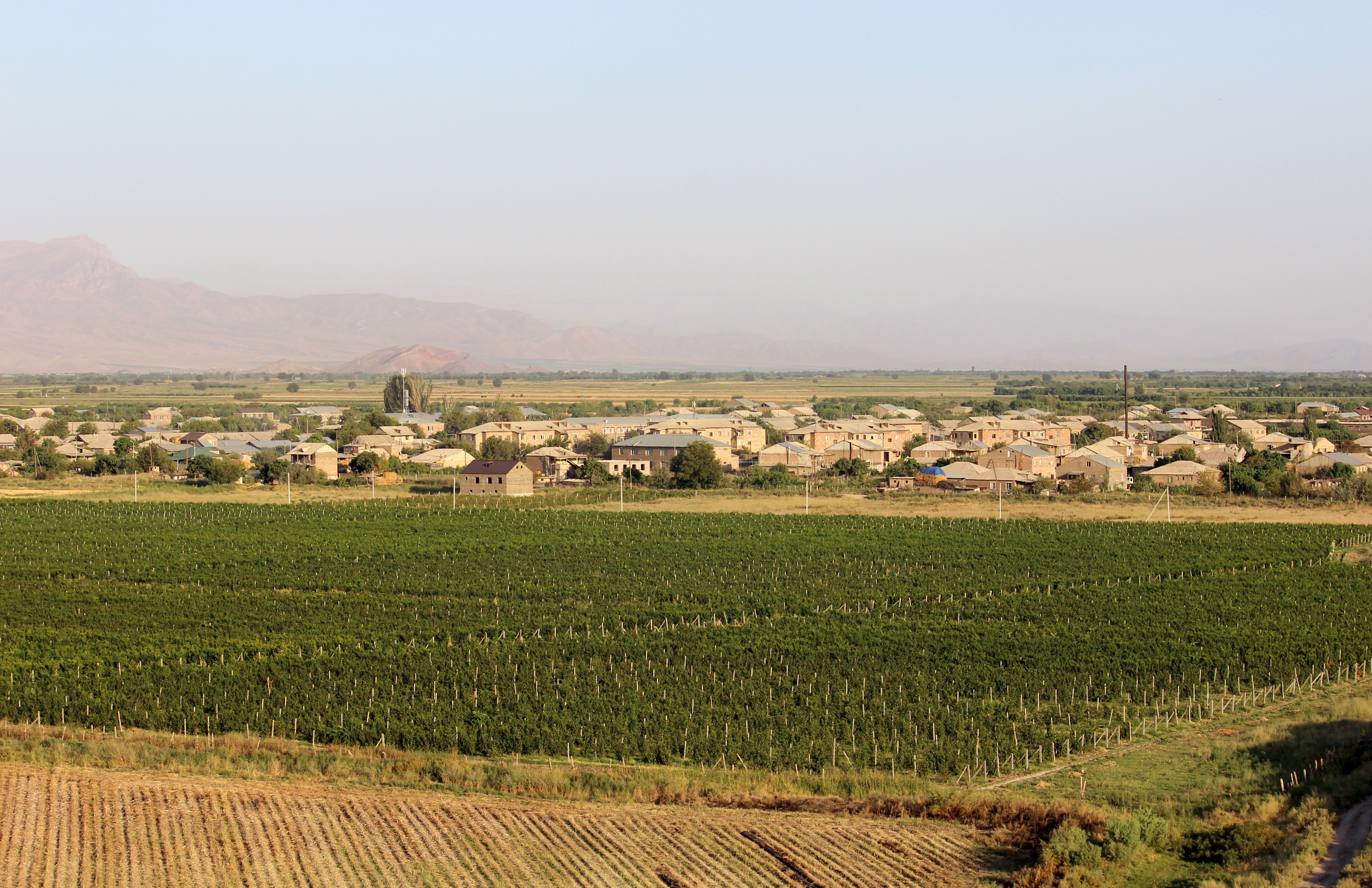
- Lusarat as viewed from Khor Virap Monastery

- Location within Armenia Location within Ararat
- Coordinates: 39°52′28″N 44°35′57″E
- Country: Armenia
- Province: Ararat
- Municipality: Vedi

Population (2011)
  - Total: 2,699
- Time zone: UTC+4
  - Summer (DST): UTC+5

Lusarat (Armenian: Լուսառատ) is a village in the Vedi Municipality of the Ararat Province of Armenia. It is situated adjacent to the Armenia–Turkey border.

== Name ==
The village was previously known until 1968 as Khor Virap.

== Monuments ==
In the village is a statue of an early 20th-century Armenian fedayi; armed defensive militia units that voluntarily defended the territory from outside forces.

The Khor Virap Monastery is also located close to the village.

== Gallery ==
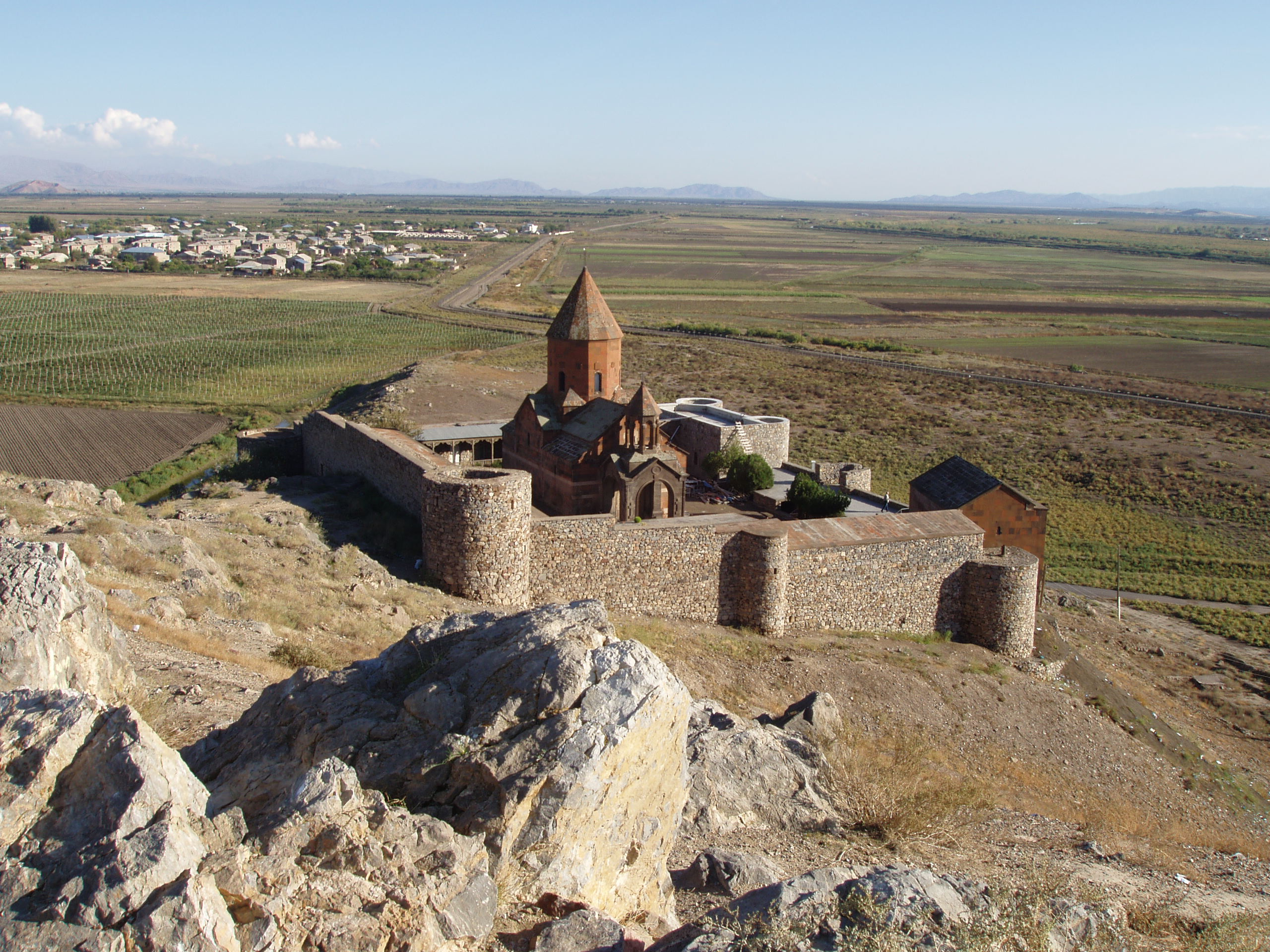
Lusarat seen in the background of Khor Virap Monastery.
