= Qımılqışlaq, Quba =

Human settlement in Azerbaijan

Qımılqışlaq (or Qumulqışlaq) is a village and municipality in the Quba Rayon of Azerbaijan. It has a population of 2790.
