= Qımılqışlaq, Khachmaz =

Qımılqışlaq
- Municipality
- Location within Azerbaijan
- Coordinates: 41°28′18″N 48°43′31″E
- Country: Azerbaijan
- Rayon: Khachmaz

Population
  - Total: 2,790
- Time zone: UTC+4 (AZT)
  - Summer (DST): UTC+5 (AZT)

Qımılqışlaq (also, Kymylkyshlak and Kymylkyshlakh) is a village and municipality in the Khachmaz Rayon of Azerbaijan. It has a population of 2,790. The municipality consists of the villages of Qımılqışlaq, Mirzəməmmədqışlaq, and Şıxlar.
