= Şıxlar, Gobustan =

Shykhlar
- Azerbaijani: Şıxlar
- Location within Azerbaijan
- Coordinates: 40°43′32″N 48°55′10″E
- Country: Azerbaijan
- District: Gobustan
- Municipality: Xilmilli

Population (2014)
  - Total: 0
- Time zone: UTC+4 (AZT)
  - Summer (DST): UTC+5 (AZT)

Şıxlar (Shykhlar) is a former village in the Gobustan District of Azerbaijan. The village formed part of the municipality of Xilmilli.
