= Şıxlar, Yardymli =

Şıxlar
- Municipality
- Location within Azerbaijan
- Coordinates: 38°59′03″N 48°22′19″E
- Country: Azerbaijan
- Rayon: Yardymli

Population
  - Total: 507
- Time zone: UTC+4 (AZT)
  - Summer (DST): UTC+5 (AZT)

Şıxlar (also spelled Shikhlar and Shykhlyar) is a village and municipality located in the Yardymli Rayon of Azerbaijan. It has a population of 507 people.
