= Şıxlar, Sabirabad =

Şıxlar
- Municipality
- Location within Azerbaijan
- Coordinates: 40°05′10″N 48°32′23″E
- Country: Azerbaijan
- Rayon: Sabirabad

Population
  - Total: 693
- Time zone: UTC+4 (AZT)
  - Summer (DST): UTC+5 (AZT)

Şıxlar (also, Shikhlyar and Shykhlyar) is a village and municipality in the Sabirabad Rayon of Azerbaijan. It has a population of 693. Muhammad Shaheer
