= Agarak monastery =

Destroyed Armenian monastery (650s-1920s)

Monastery of Agarak Ագարակի վանք
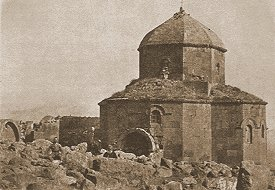

- Location within Turkey

Religion
- Affiliation: Armenian Apostolic Church
- Status: destroyed

Location
- Location: Ekrek, Iĝdir province, Turkey
- Coordinates: 40.0833°N 43.4326°E

Architecture
- Architect: Nerses Shinarar
- Style: Armenian
- Completed: 650 A.D.
- Materials: Tufa stone

Agarak (Armenian: Ագարակ) monastery is a former Armenian monastic complex of a few churches in the town of Ekrek, Iĝdir province, Turkey. Built built in the 5th or 6th century, it was destroyed after the Armenian genocide which began in 1915.

== History ==
The monastery of Agarak was founded by Nerses Shinarar, Catholicos of Armenia, sometime between 649-653 A.D. The town of Agarak (later renamed to Ekrek) was in the Surmalu uezd of the Erivan Governorate during the period of Russian rule of Armenia, until the government was dissolved in 1918. In 1920, the Armenian archaeologist Ashkharbek Kalantar visited Agarak and documented the site in detail. He recorded numerous medieval khachkars and a stele, depicting a figure holding a miniature basilica. None of these khachkars or monuments survive, and the monastery was destroyed in the 1920s.

The monastery today is a completely ruined structure in the village of Ekrek in Iĝdir province of Turkey.

== Architecture ==
The monastery consisted of two churches: a domed quatrefoil church, and a single-naved church. The domed church was named Sourb Stephanos, and had a tiled conical roof; it was probably built around 650 AD. The single-naved church was likely an earlier construction than the domed church, built in the 5th or 6th century.
