= Zvartnots Cathedral =

Cathedral in Armenia

- Զվարթնոցի տաճար
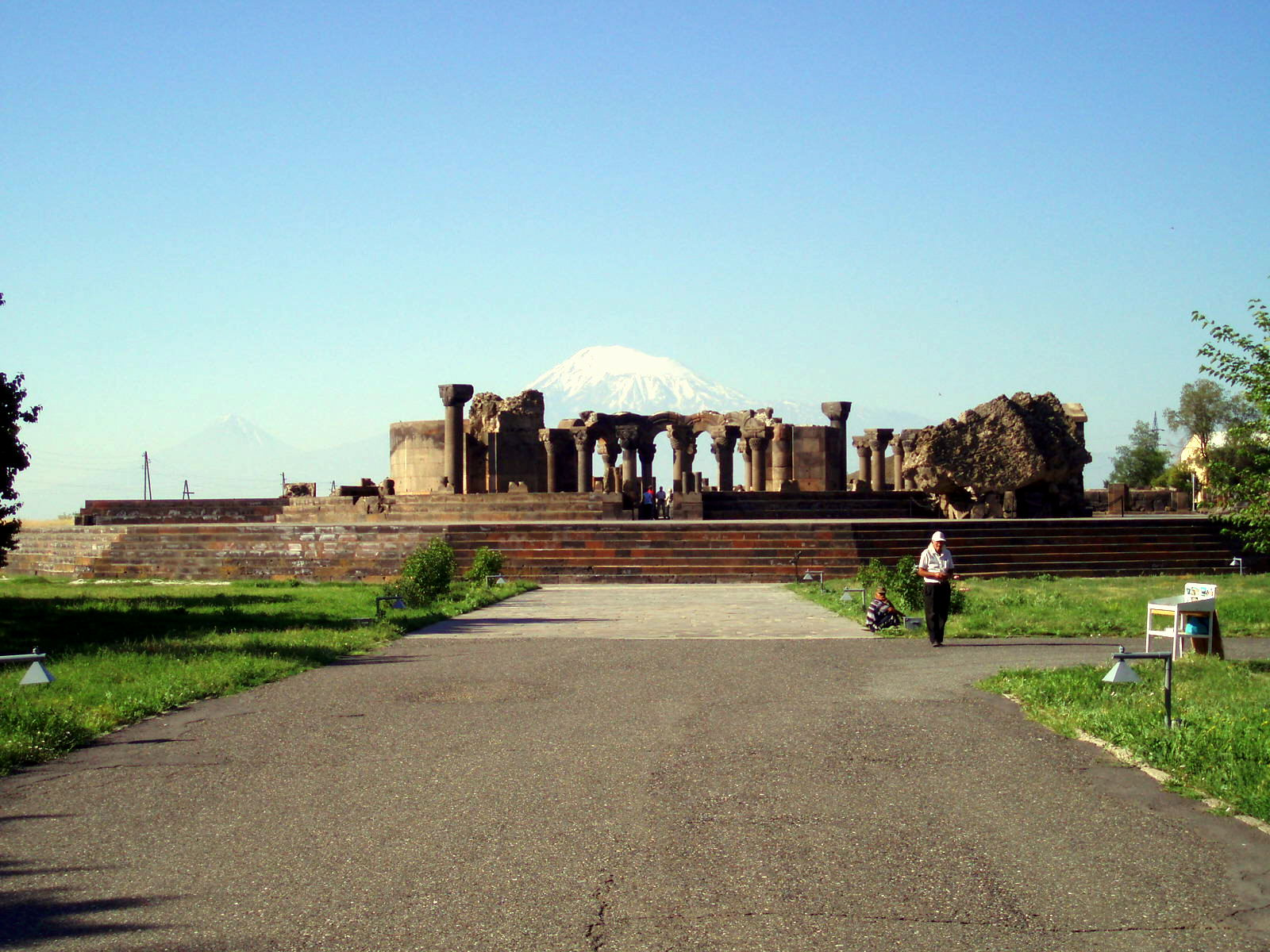
- Common view of the Zvartnots ruins

- Location within Armenia

Religion
- Affiliation: Armenian Apostolic Church
- Status: in ruins

Location
- Location: Vagharshapat (Etchmiadzin), Armavir Province, Armenia
- Coordinates: 40.159714°N 44.336575°E

Architecture
- Type: Central-plan aisled tetra-conch (Circular)
- Style: Armenian
- Groundbreaking: 643
- Completed: 652

Specifications
- Height (max): 45 meters
- Materials: tufa, pumice and obsidian
- UNESCO World Heritage Site
- Official name: Cathedral and Churches of Etchmiadzin and the Archaeological Site of Zvartnots
- Type: Cultural
- Criteria: (ii) (iii)
- Designated: 2000 (24th session)
- Reference no.: 1011-006
- Region: Caucasus

Zvartnots Cathedral (Armenian: Զուարթնոց (classical); Զվարթնոց (reformed), sometimes rendered in scholarly works as Zuart'nots' or Zuart'noc' ; lit. 'place of resurrection/lifefulness/joyfulness') is a medieval Armenian cathedral near Vagharshapat (Ejmiatsin), Armenia. Built in the seventh century and now lying in ruins, Zvartnots was noted for its circular exterior structure, unique in medieval Armenian architecture, and a set of interior piers that upheld a multifloor structure crowned with a dome.

== History ==
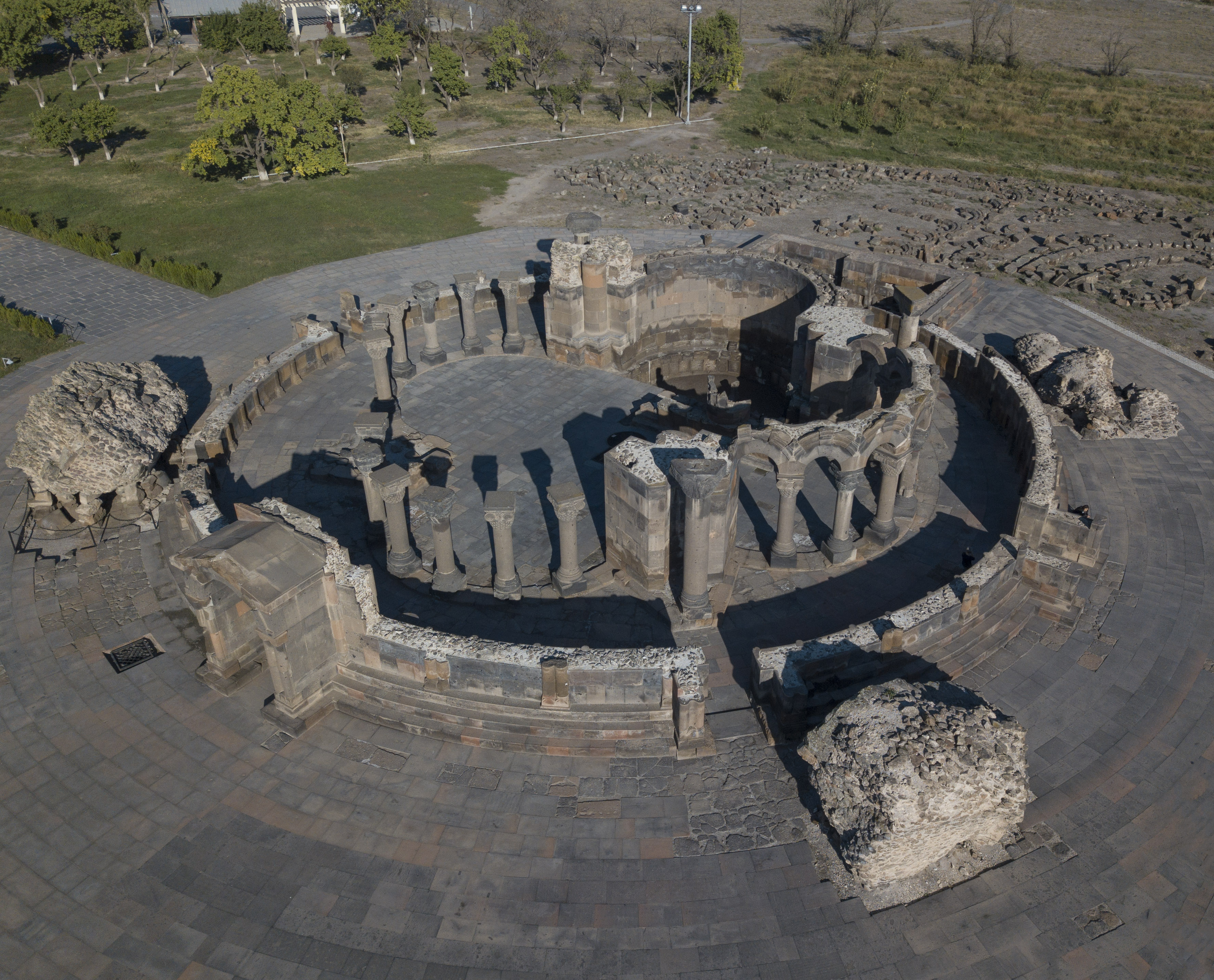
Aerial view of the Cathedral.

Zvartnots was built during the first Muslim Arab raids to capture and conquer the territories of Byzantine and Sasanian Armenia. Construction of the cathedral began in 643, under the guidance of Catholicos Nerses III the Builder (Shinogh). Dedicated to St. Gregory, the cathedral was built on a location where a meeting between King Trdat III and Gregory the Illuminator was said to have taken place. According to the medieval Armenian historian Movses Kaghankatvatsi, the cathedral was consecrated in 652. From 653 to 659, Nerses was in Tayk and the construction of the cathedral continued under Anastas Akoratsi. Following the Arab occupation of Dvin and wars of growing intensity between the Byzantine and Arab armies on the former's eastern borders, Nerses transferred the patriarchal palace of the catholicos from Dvin to Zvartnots.

The exterior church design, featuring basket capitals with Ionic volute mounts, eagle capitals and vine scroll friezes, reveals the influence of Syrian and northern Mesopotamian architecture.

Zvartnots stood for 320 years before collapsing in the tenth century; by the time the eleventh-century historian Stepanos Taronetsi mentioned the church in his Universal History the cathedral was already in ruins. How it collapsed is still debated, though most argue for one of two theories: an earthquake or attacks arising from repeated Arab raids.

The most common explanation is the earthquake collapse, though the building was well engineered and designed to last 1,000 years (a projected date for the second coming of Christ). Excavations have uncovered traces of large fires at the site, perhaps of an earlier attempt to destroy the church, though the construction also included firing of obsidian and lime mortar to form the mortar joints (firing it into brick) and an excavation campaign in 1893 used fire and explosives to clear away debris. A close copy of the cathedral was erected at Ani, designed by Trdat the Architect, during the reign of Gagik I Bagratuni in the final decade of the tenth century. Stepanos Taronetsi referred to Zvartnots when describing the church that Gagik I had inaugurated as "a large structure at Vałaršapat [Vagharshapat], dedicated to the same saint that had fallen into ruins."

== Excavations ==
The remaining ruins of Zvartnots were uncovered at the beginning of the twentieth century. The site was excavated between 1901 and 1907 under the direction of Khachik vardapet Dadian uncovered the foundations of the cathedral as well as the remains of the catholicosal palace and a winery. The excavations furthermore revealed that Zvartnots stood on the remnants of structures that dated back to the reign of Urartian king Rusa II.

== Design ==
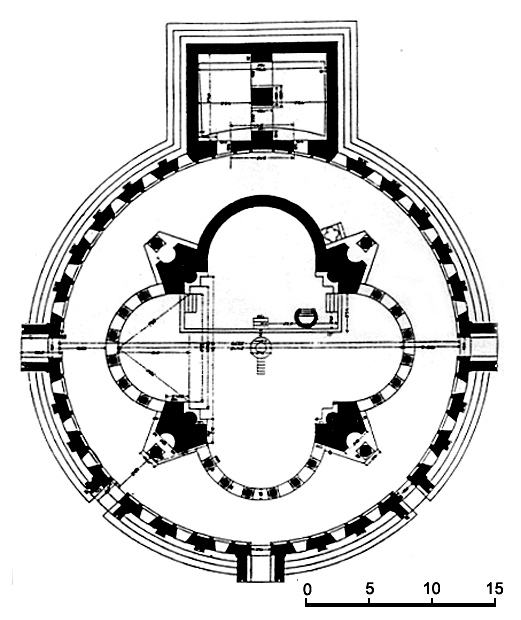
The plan of the cathedral, as drawn by Toros Toramanian.

Zvartnots was designed according to a centrally planned, aisled tetraconch layout. The interior of the mosaic-decorated church was built in the shape of a Greek cross (tetraconch), with an aisle encircling this area, while the exterior was a 32-sided polygon which appeared circular from a distance.

Many scholars accept the 1905 reconstruction by Toros Toramanian, who worked on the original excavations and who proposed that the building had three floors. Others, such as Stepan Mnatsakanian and A. Kuznetsov, have disputed or rejected entirely his rendering. They instead have offered alternative plans. Kuznetsov, for example, contended that Toramanian's plan was "illogical from a construction perspective" and insisted that the technical expertise at the time did not correspond to the bold design as conceived by Toramanian.

According to Stepanos Asoghik, an Armenian historian of the 10th–11th centuries, its design was adopted for the church built in Ani by king Gagik around 1000. So one of the 2 churches could be depicted upon Mount Ararat in a relief on Sainte-Chapelle in Paris.

Zvartnots was added to the UNESCO World Heritage list in 2000 together with churches in Vagharshapat (Etchmiadzin).

A drawing of the cathedral was depicted on the first release of 100 AMD banknotes and its model can be seen in Yerevan History Museum.

== Influence ==
The church of St. Gregory (better known as Gagkashen) in Ani (now in Turkey) was built in 1001–1005 and was intended to be a recreation of Zvartnots.

The Holy Trinity Church in the Malatia-Sebastia district of Yerevan is modeled by architect Baghdasar Arzoumanian after Zvartnots and was completed in 2003.

== Gallery ==
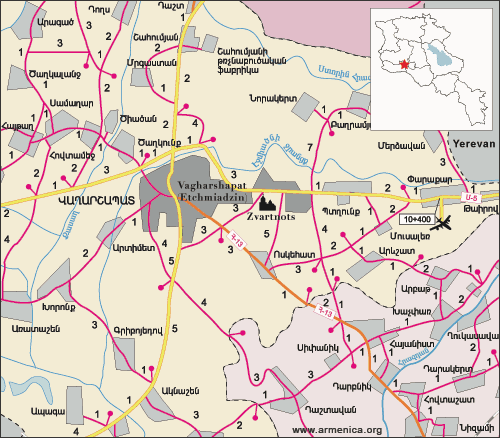
Road map around the site of Zvartnots

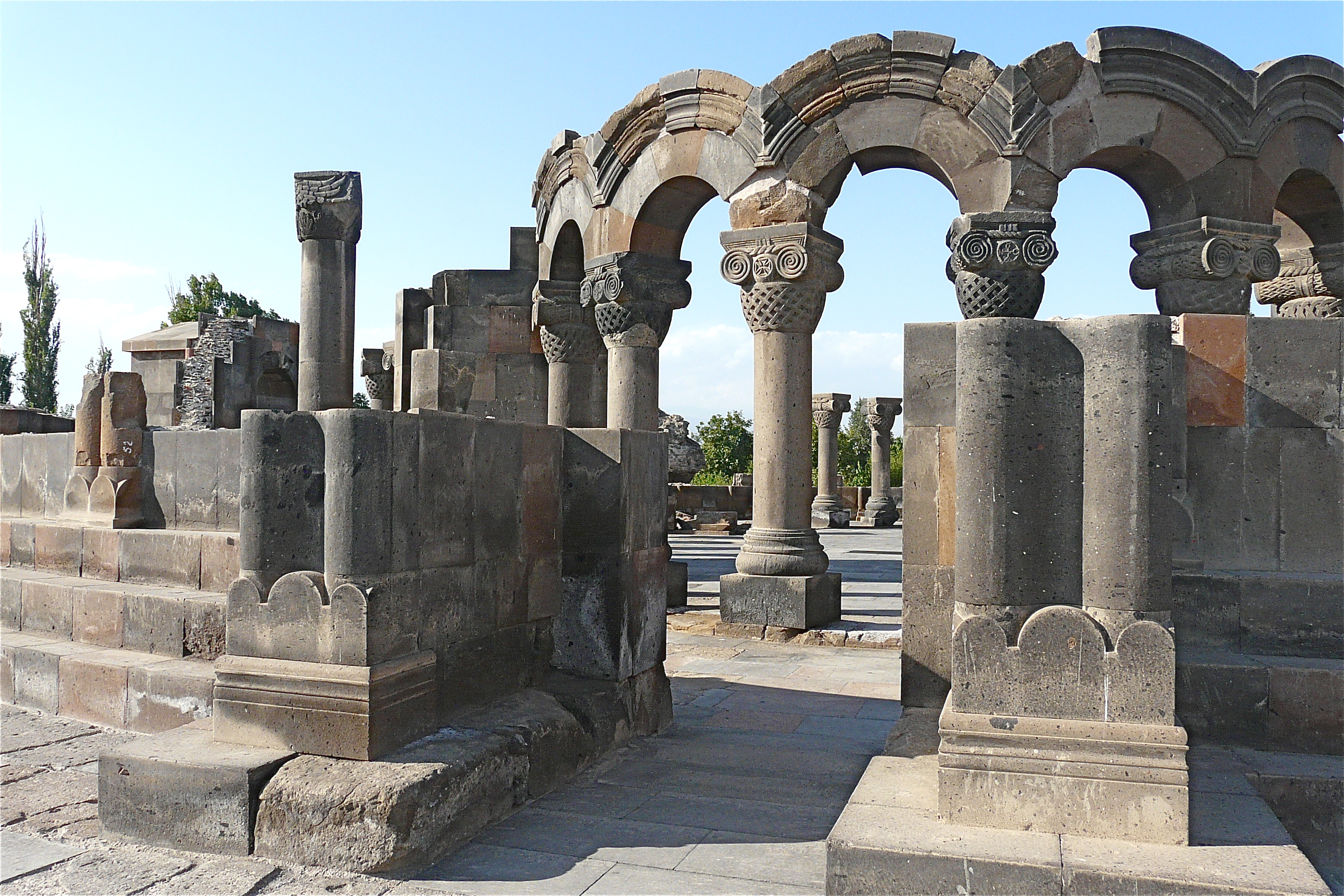
Zvartnots Columns

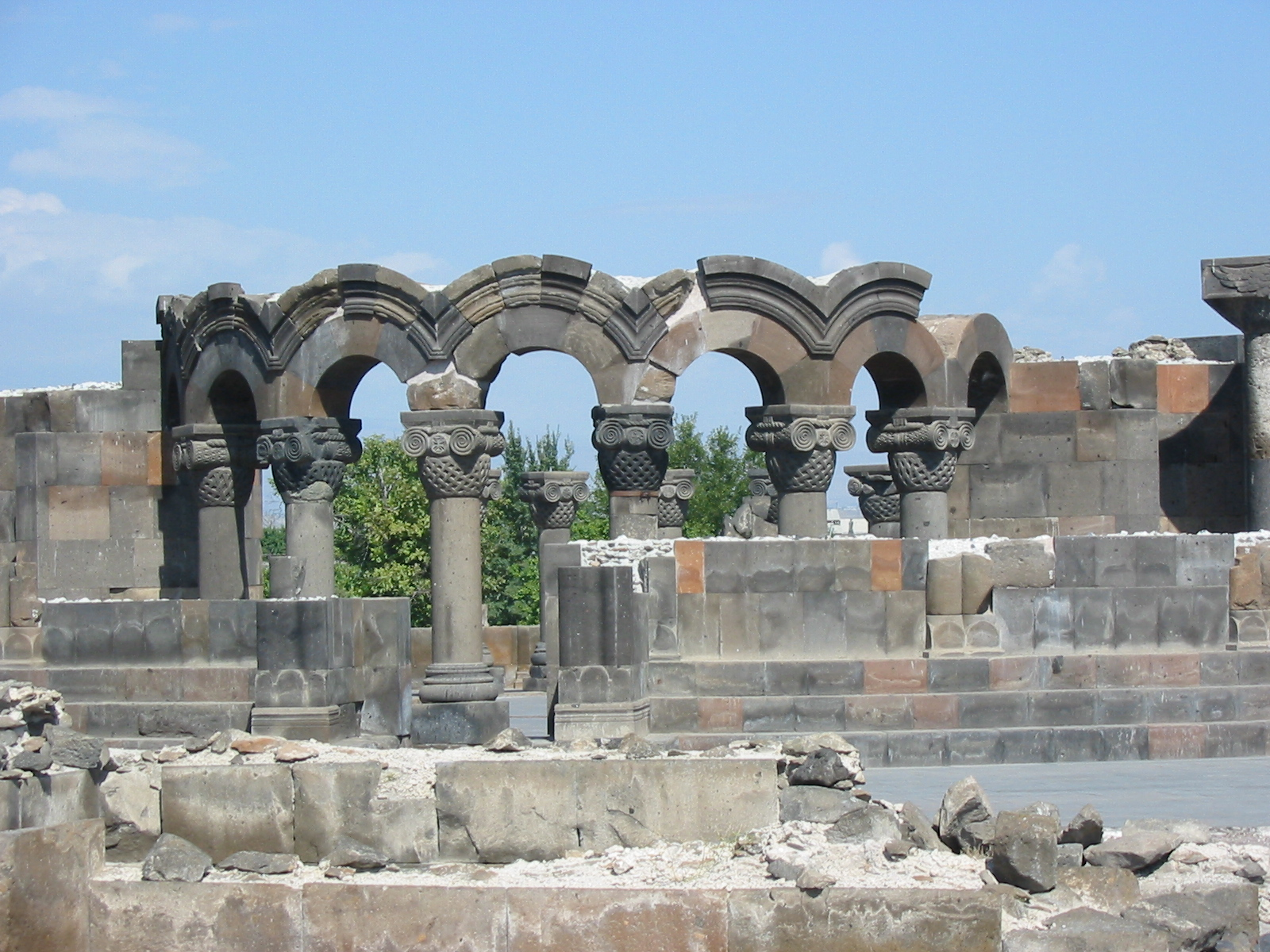
Rebuilt sections of the ruins of Zvartnots Cathedral

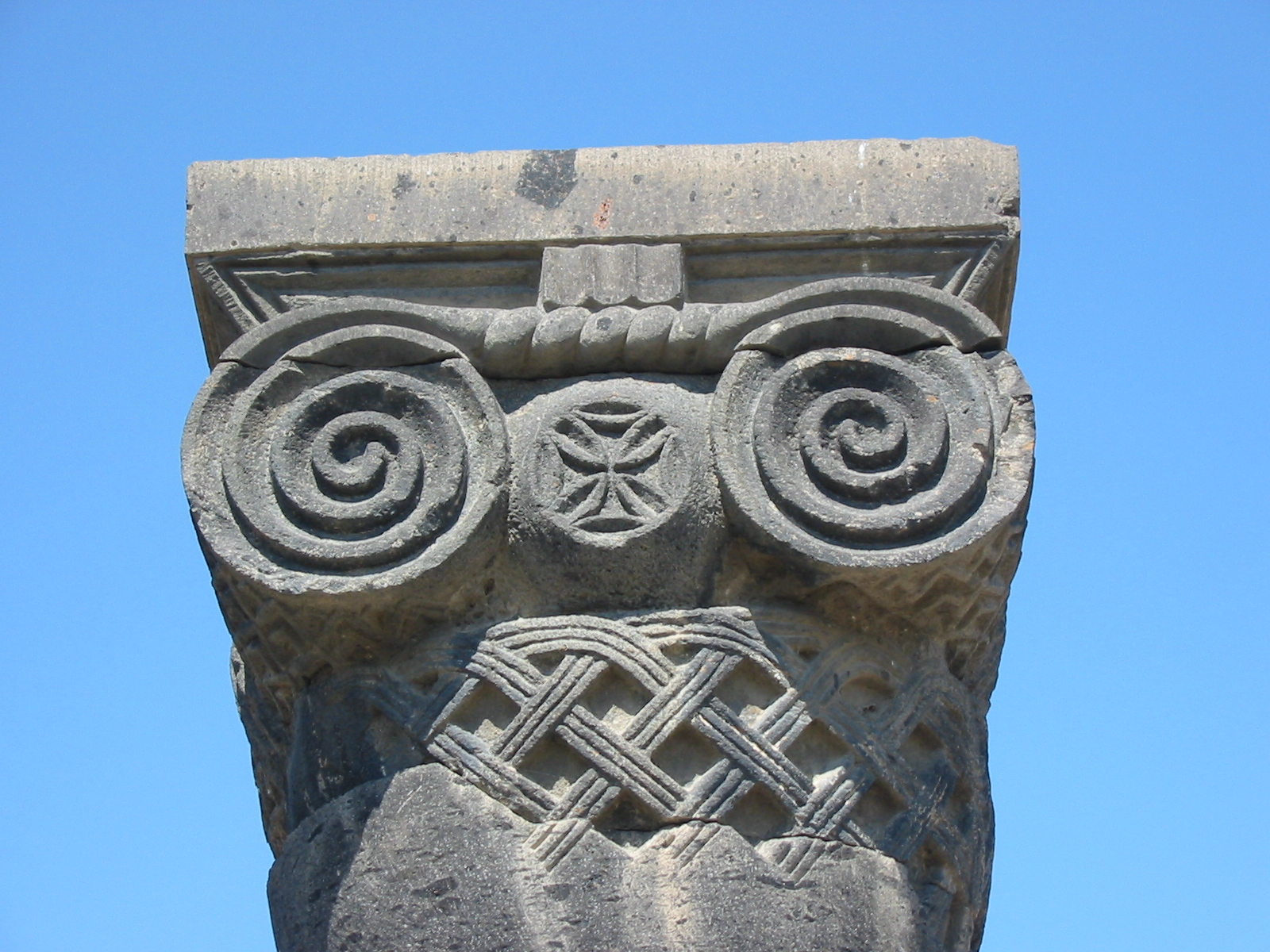
Partially reconstructed "Armenian Ionic" capital on top of one of the columns

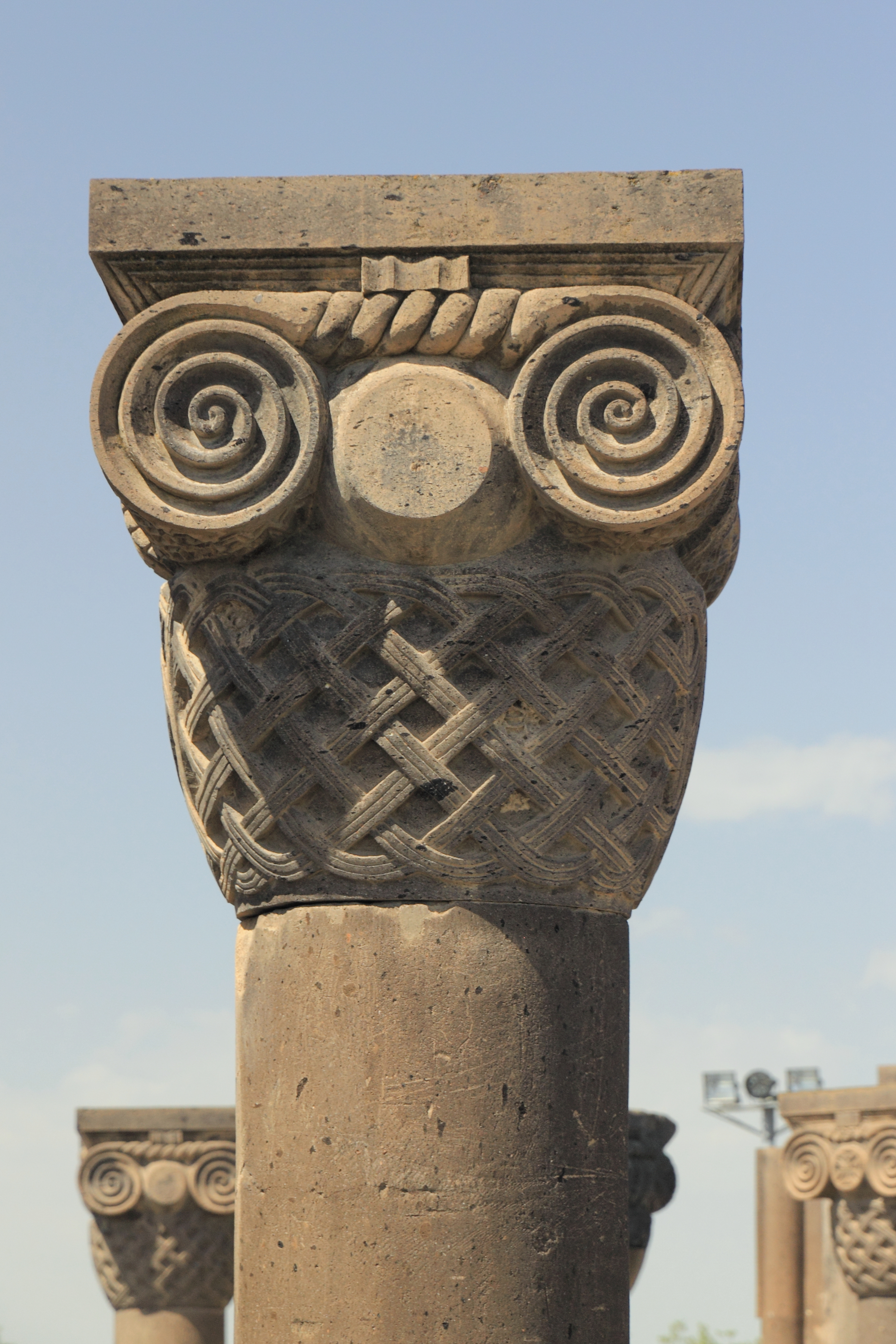

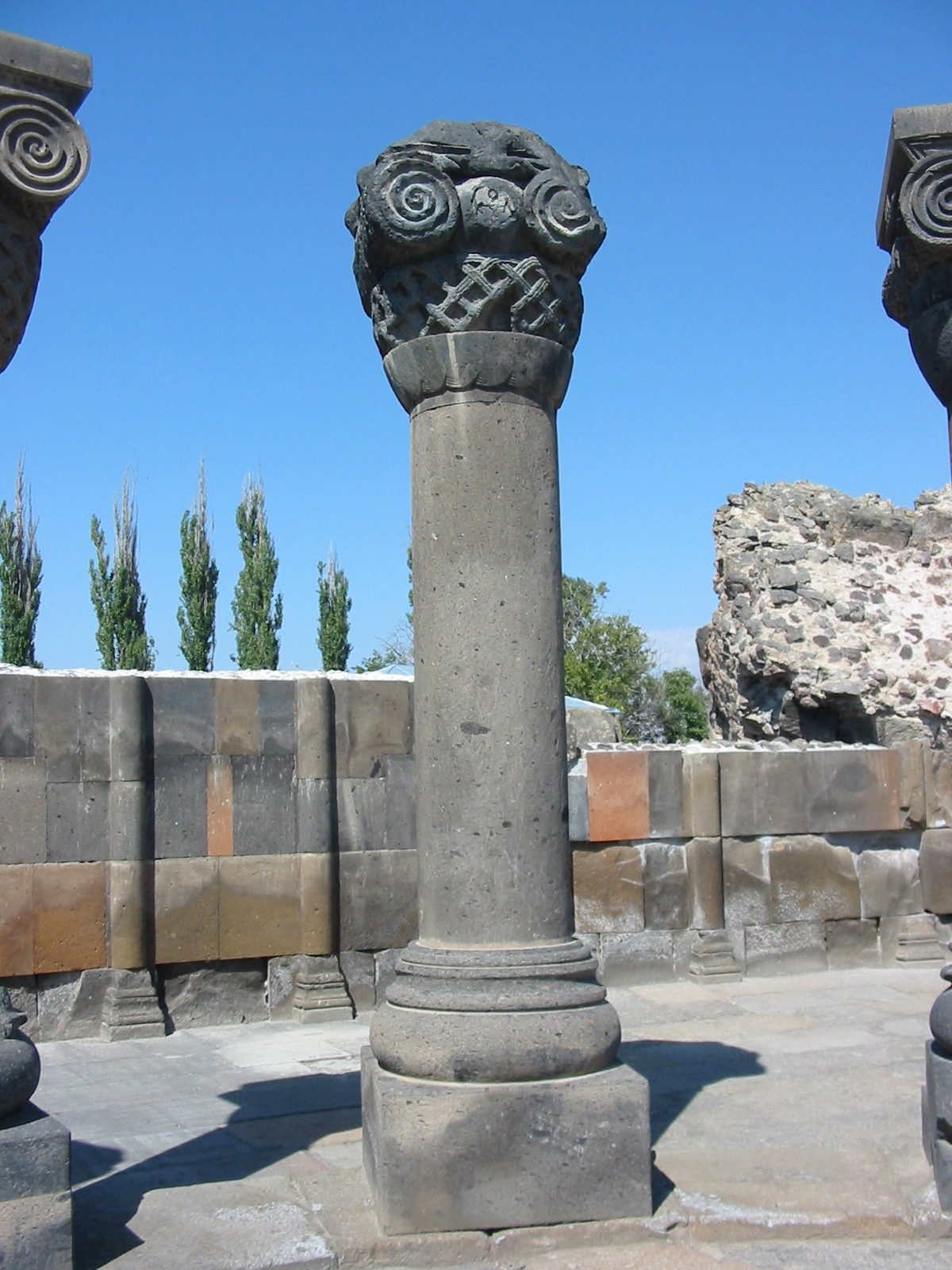
One of the columns in the church ruins

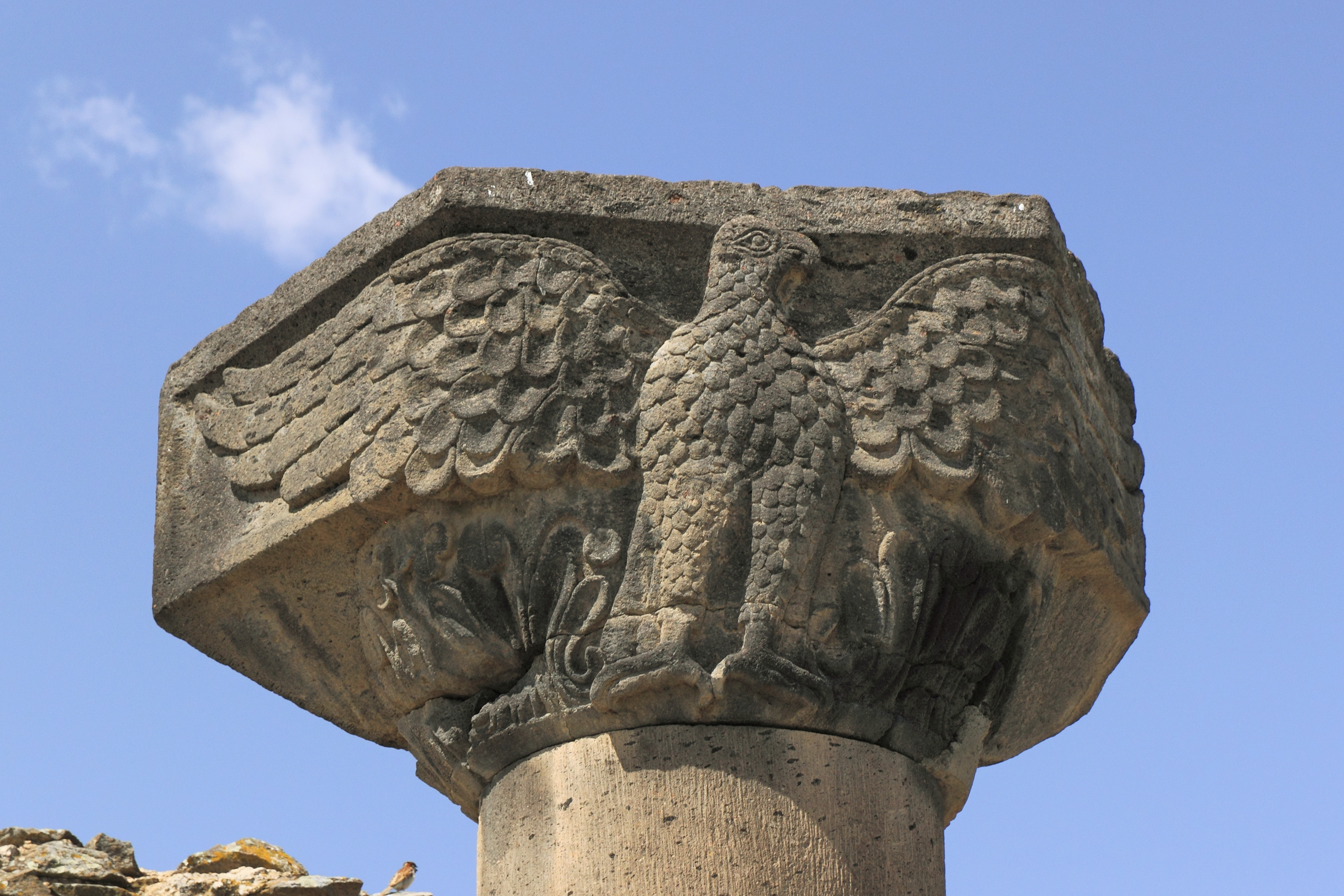

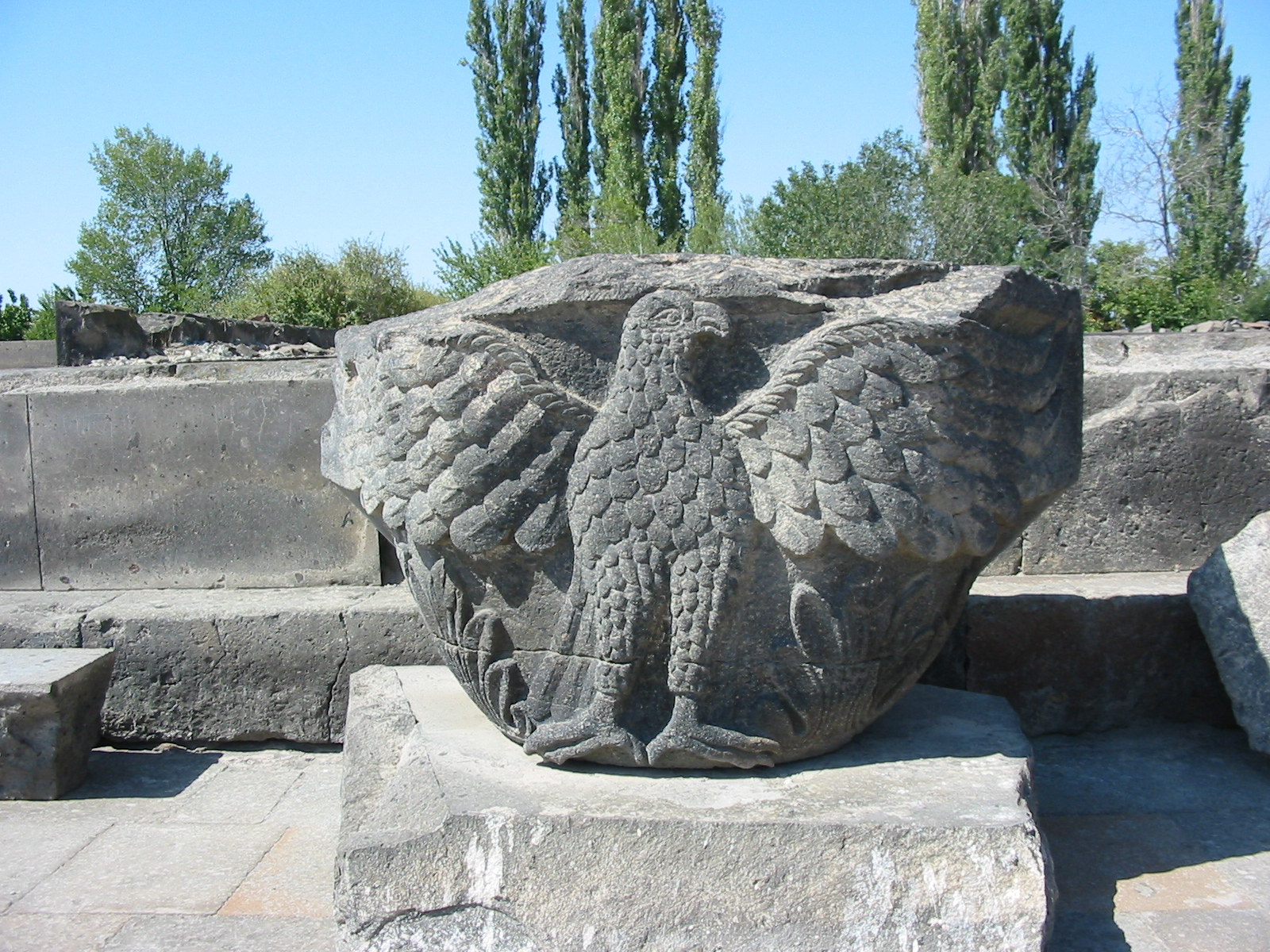
Ruins of Zvartnots. One of the eagle capitals

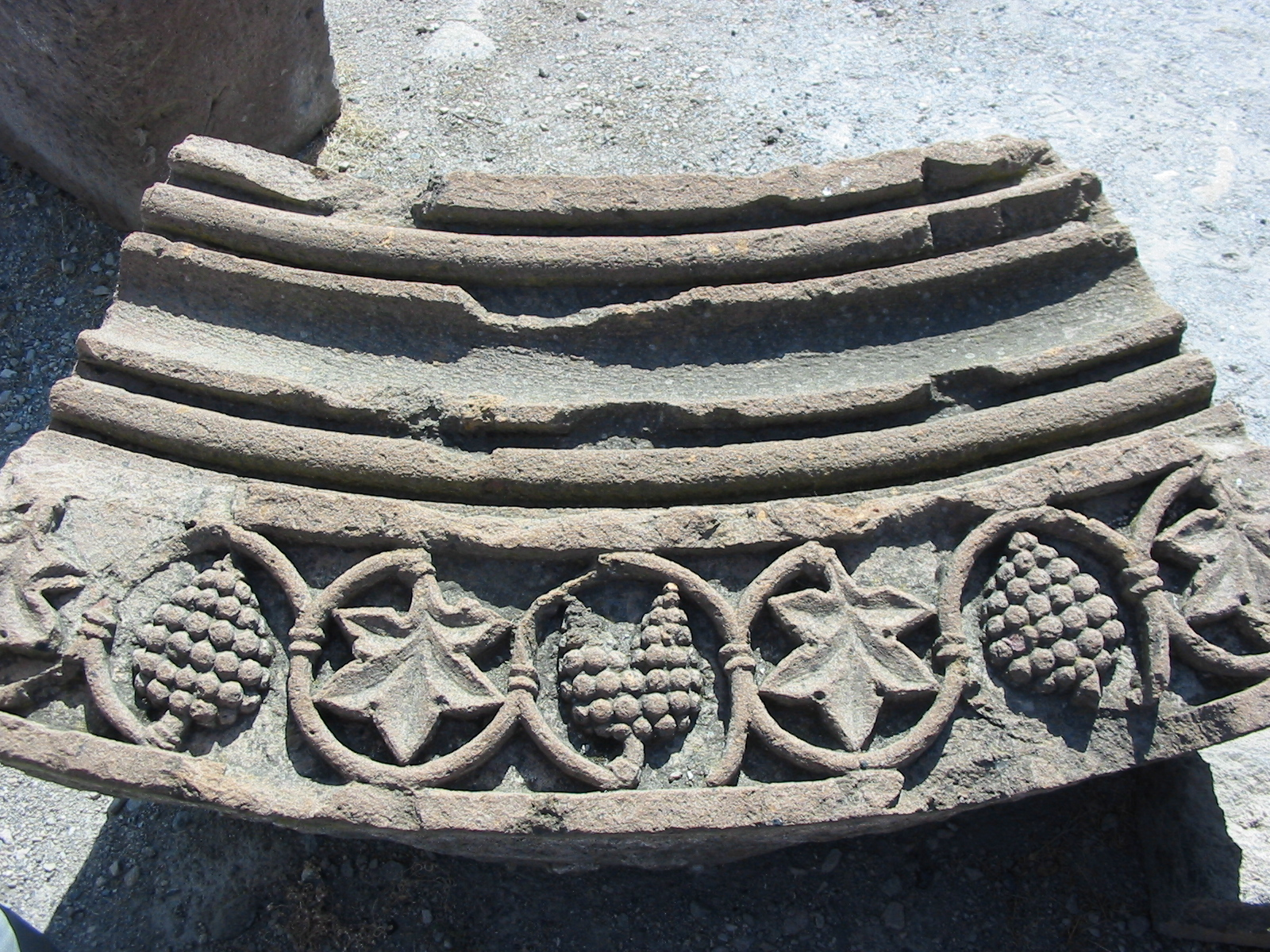
Ruins of Zvartnots. Fragment of the blind arcade

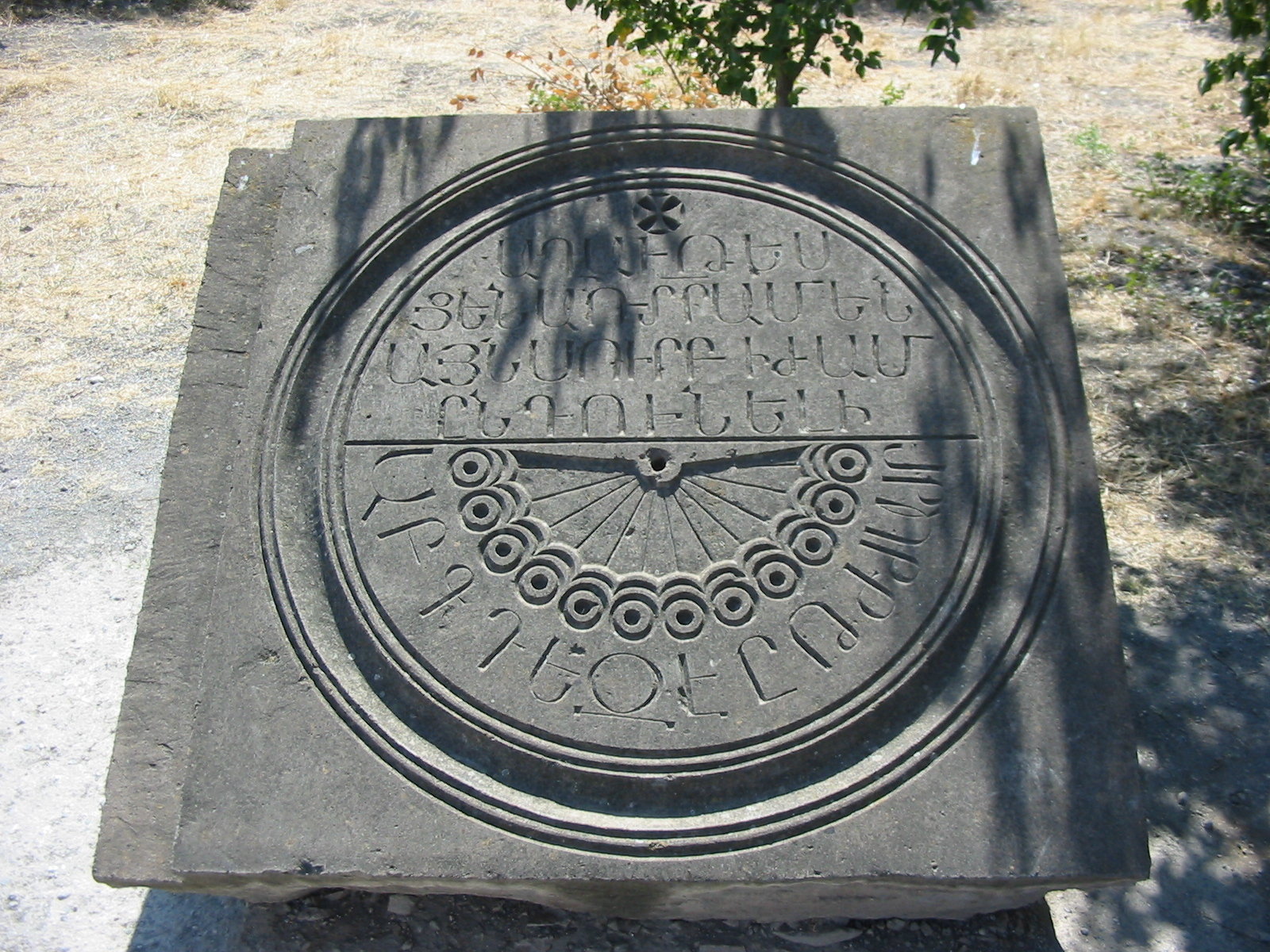
Ruins of Zvartnots. A modern reproduction of the sun-dial

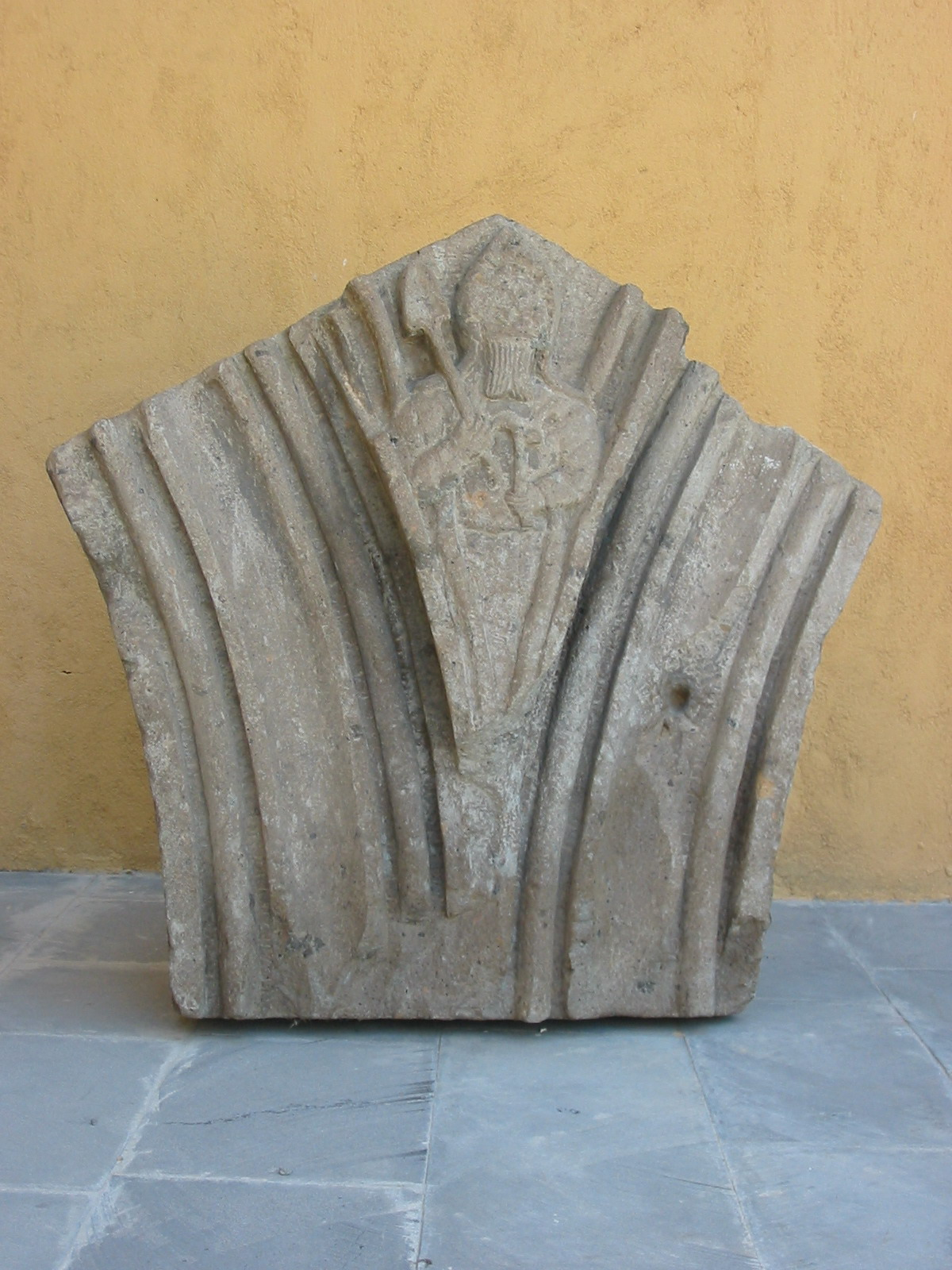
Ruins of Zvartnots. Spandrel of the blind arcade containing a depiction of a mason

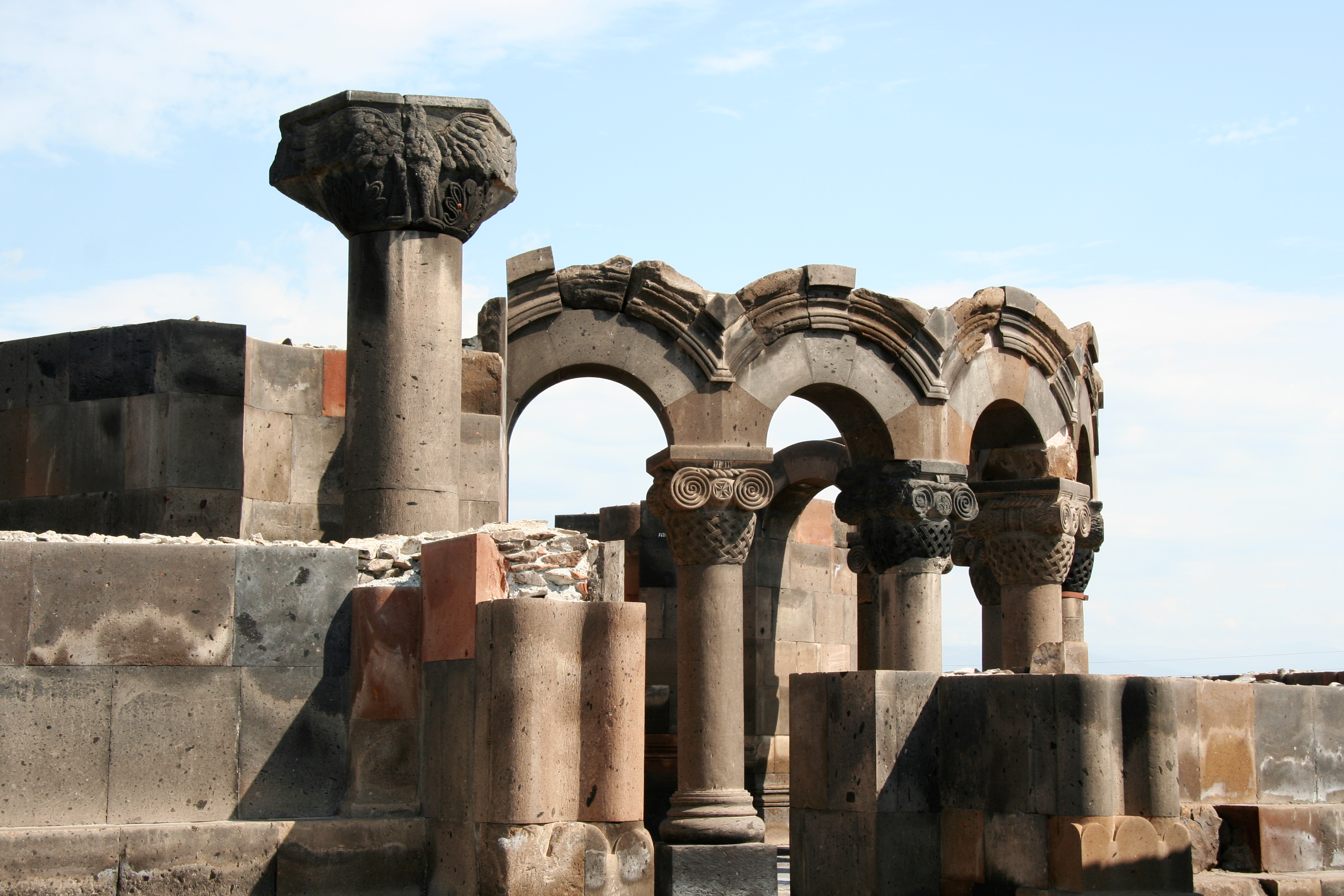
Reconstructed Columns at Zvartnots Cathedral, Armenia

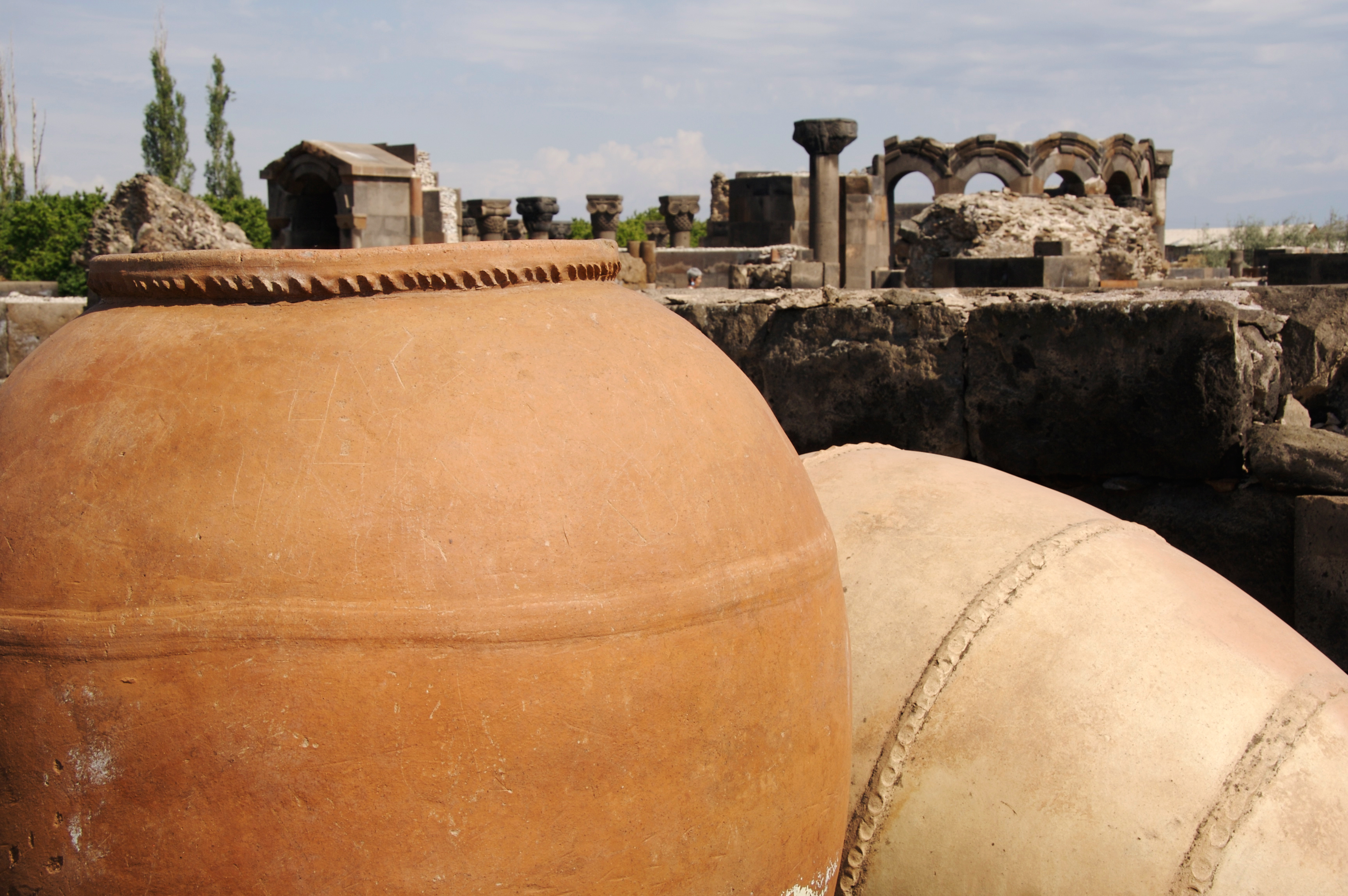
Wine vessels at Zvartnots Cathedral, Armenia

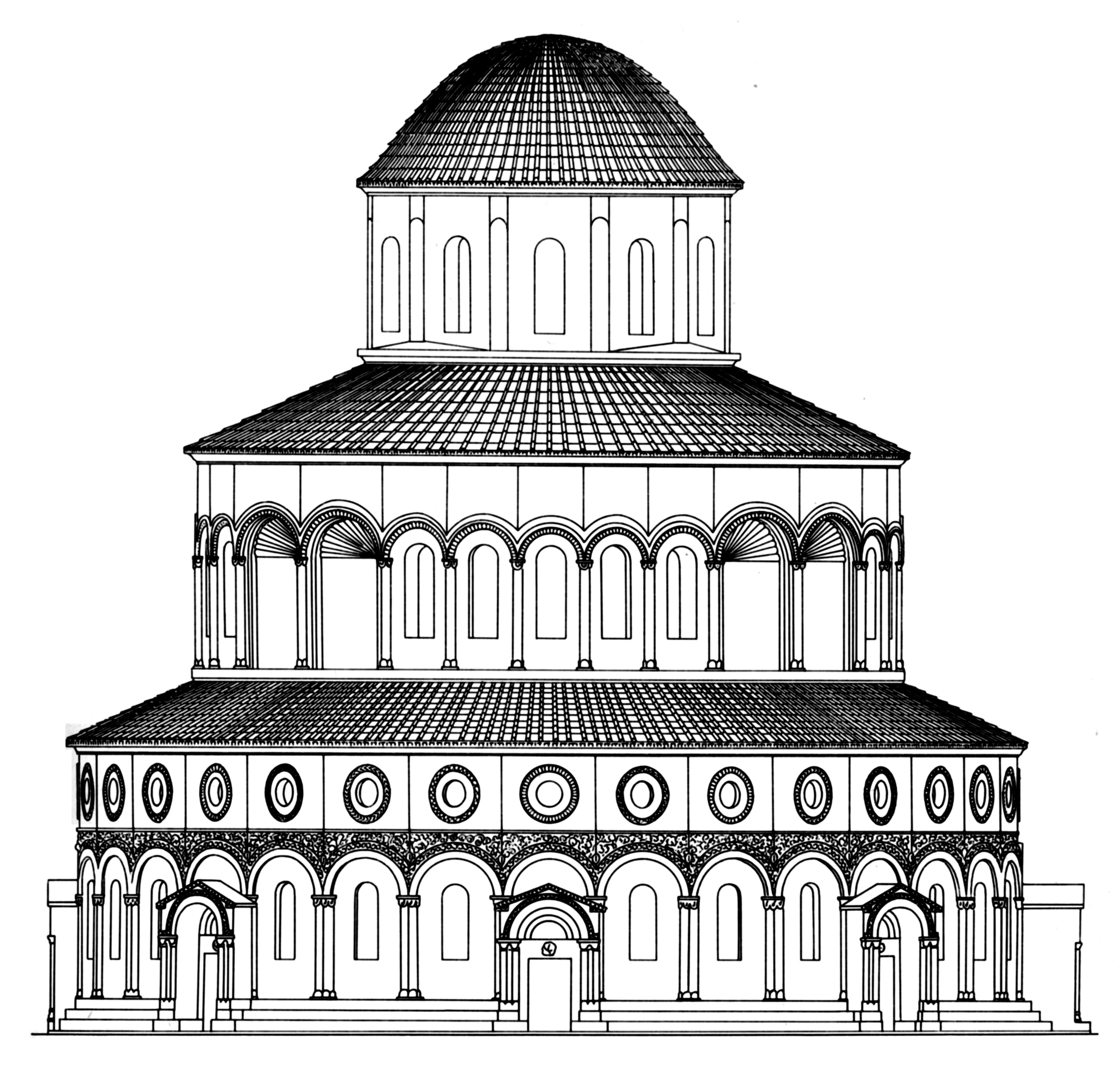
Reconstruction of Zvartnots

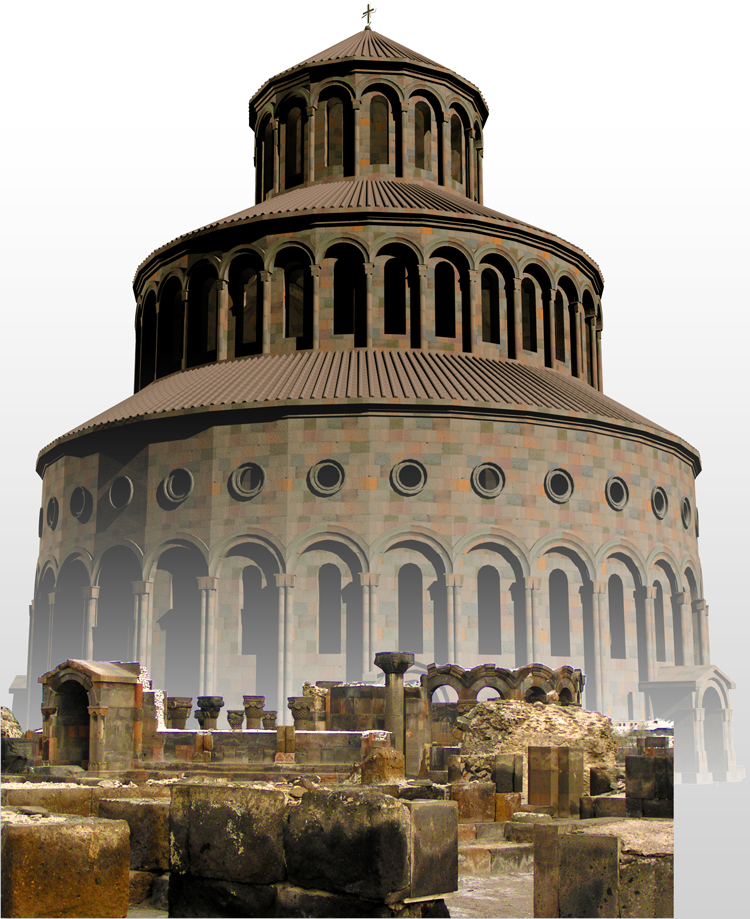
Exterior Reconstruction overlaid on ruins by Toramanian

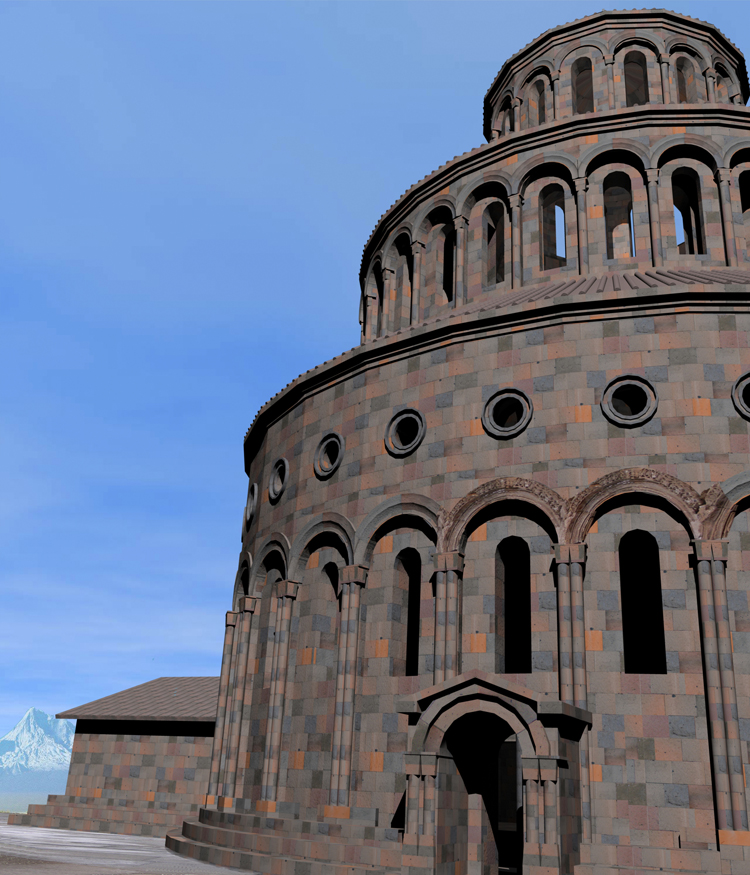
Exterior Reconstruction by Toramanian

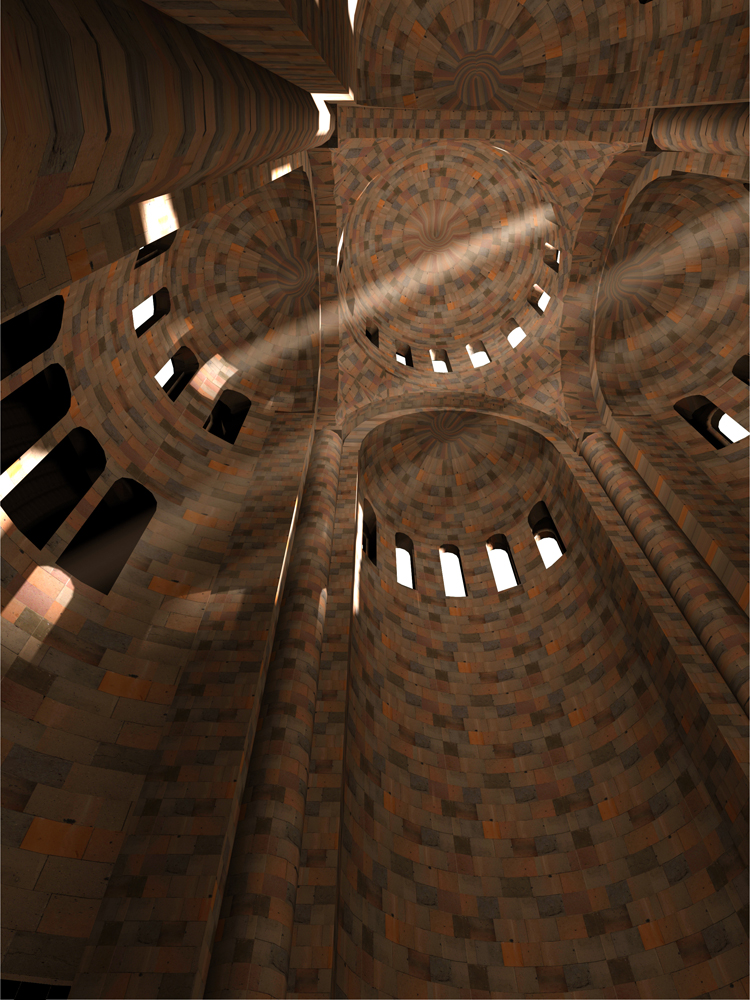
Interior Reconstruction by Toramanian

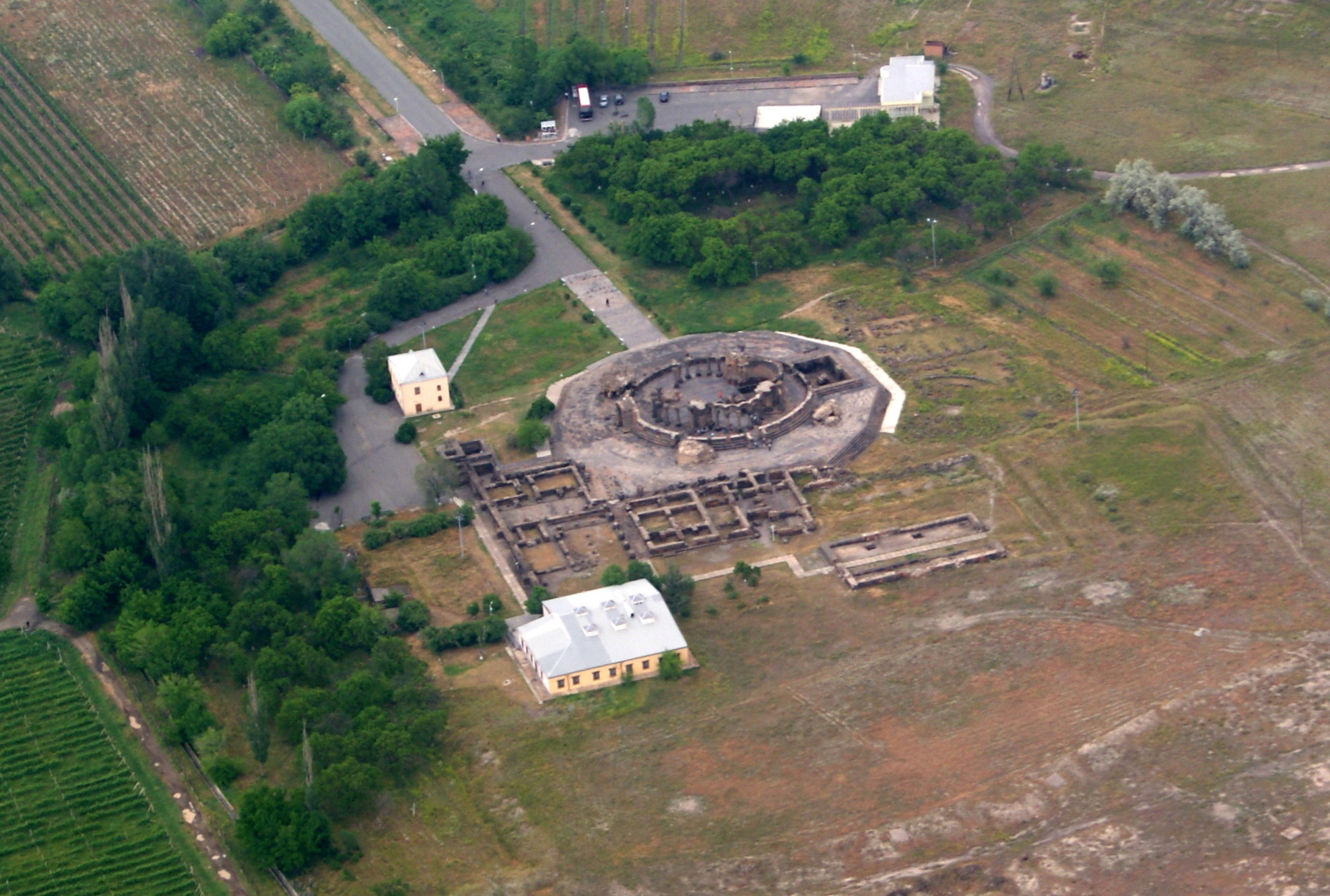
Aerial view of the entire complex
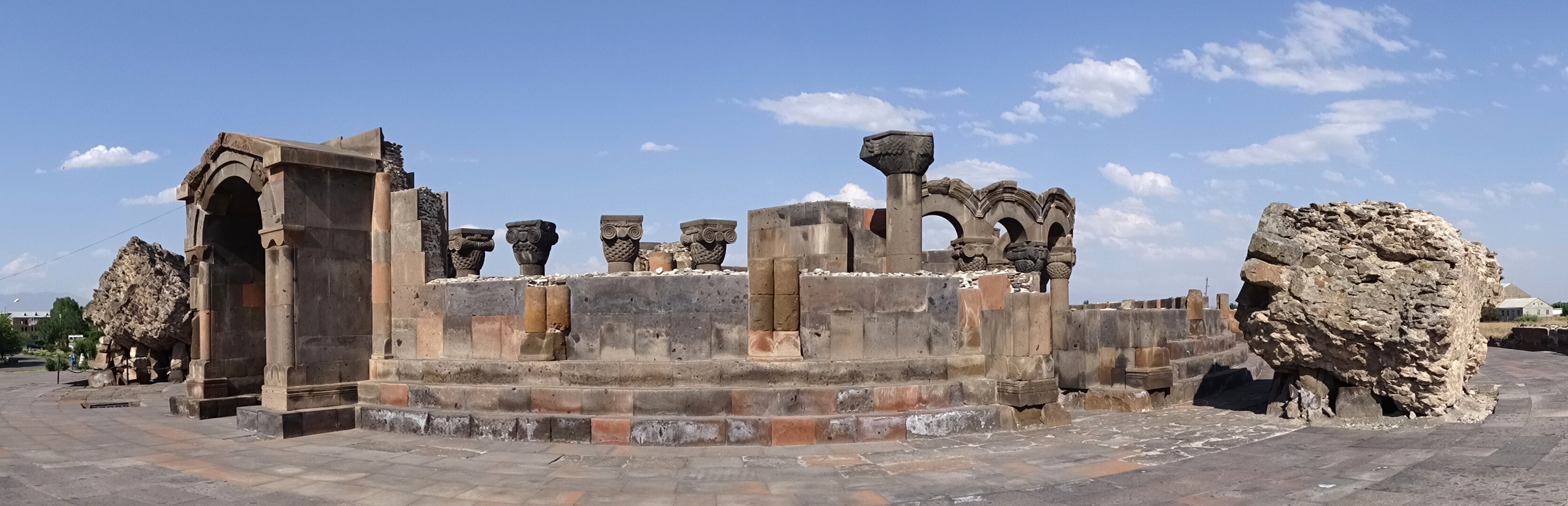
Panoramic view of Zvartnots

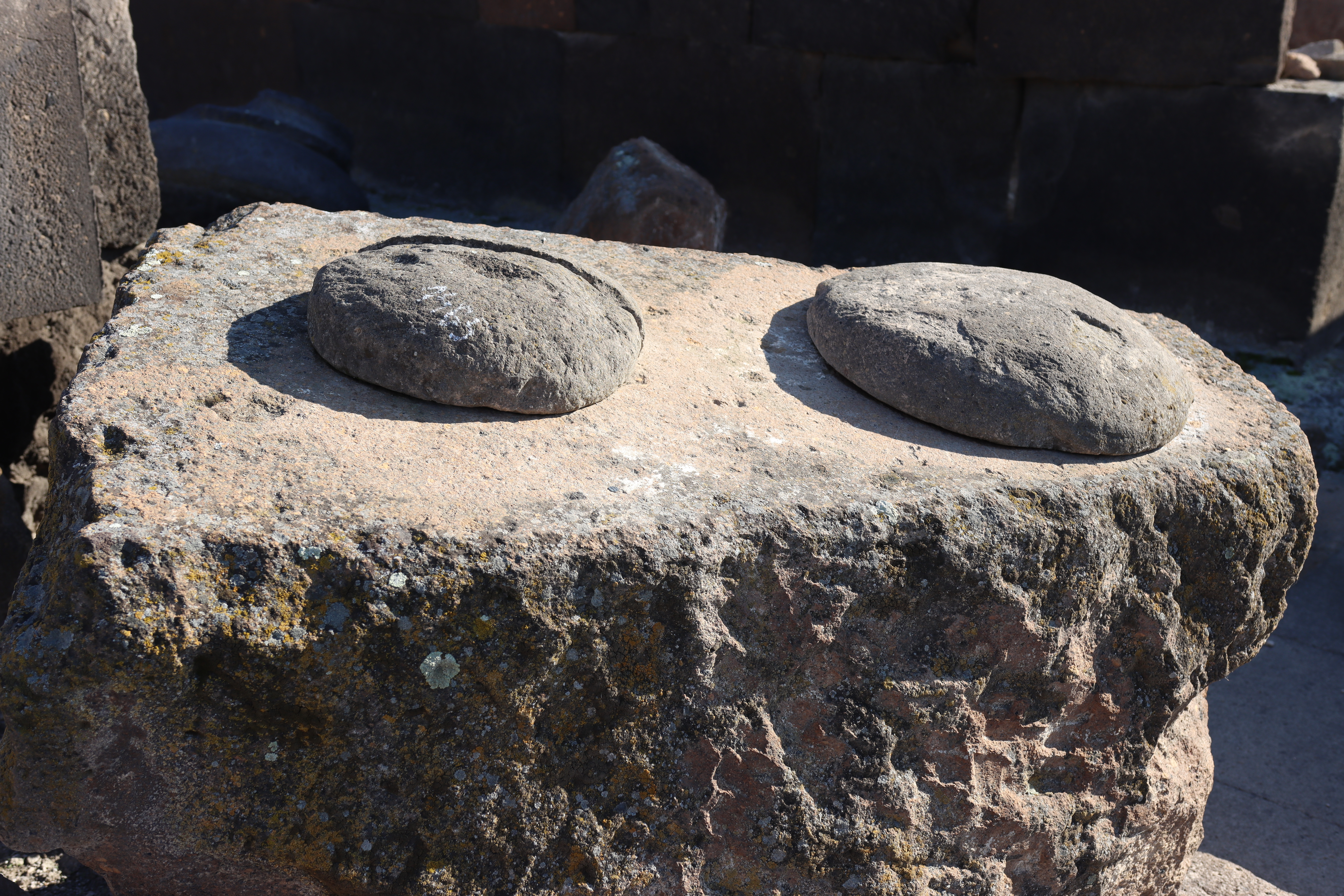
Detail on one of the stones

== See also ==
- Etchmiadzin Cathedral
- Saint Gayane Church
- Saint Hripsime Church
- Shoghakat Church
- Banak Cathedral
- Gharghavank
- List of tallest structures built before the 20th century

== Travel guides ==
- Kiesling, Brady (June 2000). Rediscovering Armenia: An Archaeological/Touristic Gazetteer and Map Set for the Historical Monuments of Armenia (PDF). Archived (PDF) from the original on 6 November 2021.
- Kiesling, Brady (2005), Rediscovering Armenia: Guide, Yerevan, Armenia: Matit Graphic Design Studio
