= Nerses III the Builder =

Catholicoi of Armenia

There was also a Caucasian Albanian Catholicos Nerses III, who ruled in 1235–1262.

Nerses III the Builder (Armenian: Ներսես Գ Շինող Nerses 3 Shinogh) was the Catholicos of the Armenian Apostolic Church between 641 and 661. He was originally from the village of Ishkhan in Tayk. He ruled at a troubled time during which Armenia had to choose between their neighbors Byzantines and Persians along with their new conquerors the Arabs.

Catholicos Nerses III received the title of the Builder due to the grand construction works he undertook during his reign. The most important ones were the construction of a chapel over the pit of imprisonment of St. Gregory the Illuminator at Khor Virap (which was replaced a thousand years later by the current church) and the magnificent cathedral of Zvartnots. One tradition says he might have been buried on the northern side of the church. Lesser works include the Agarak monastery.

Religious titles
Preceded by Ezra of Armenia	Catholicos of the Holy See of St. Echmiadzin and All Armenians; 641–661	Succeeded by Anastasius of Armenia
