= Newroz as celebrated by Kurds =

Kurdish new year holiday

Newroz نەورۆز
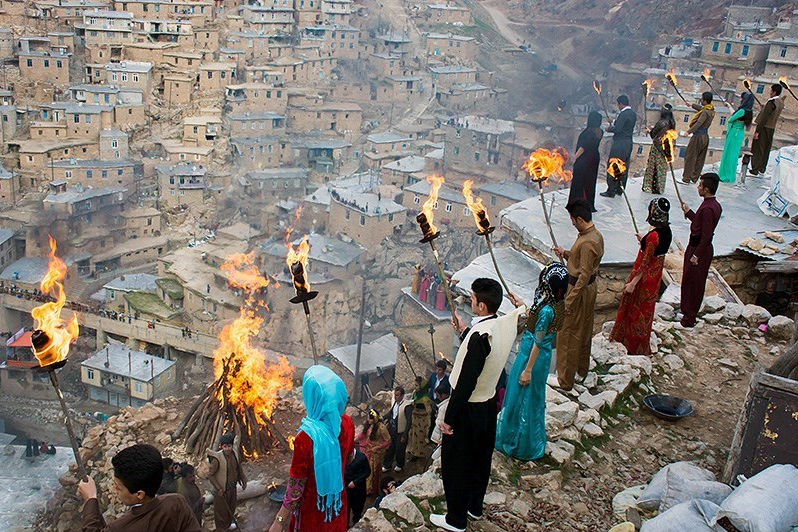
- Kurds celebrating Newroz in the village of Pallingan.
- Type: National, ethnic, international
- Significance: New Year holiday
- Date: Usually on March 21; but also 19 and 20.
- Frequency: annual

Newroz (Kurdish: نەورۆز) is the Kurdish celebration of Nowruz; the arrival of spring and new year in Kurdish culture. The lighting of the fires at the beginning of the evening of March 20 is the main symbol of Newroz among the Kurds.

Newroz is celebrated on or around the March equinox. In Turkey in particular, it became closely associated with Kurdish political mobilisation from the 1990s, and it is presented in Kurdish nationalist discourse as a national day. The festival draws on older Iranian new-year traditions, and its modern Kurdish form developed in the 20th century. In Kurdish legend, the holiday celebrates the deliverance of the Kurds from tyranny, with a blacksmith leading an uprising of villagers against a tyrannical king. It is seen as another way of demonstrating support for the Kurdish cause. The celebration usually falls on 21 March and is usually held between 18 and 24 March. The festival has an important place in terms of Kurdish identity for the majority of Kurds. Though celebrations vary, people generally gather together to welcome the coming of spring; they wear traditional coloured Kurdish clothes, dance together, light fires to dance around and jump over the bonfire, play Kurdish games.

== History ==
Newroz belongs to a wider group of new-year festivals held around the March equinox in the Iranian world, with earlier forms tracing from the Babylonian Akitu to the Achaemenid-era Nowruz. In antiquity and the medieval period, the festival was linked to displays of royal power and to the timing of tax collection, as well as to Zoroastrian ritual. March remained the start of the fiscal year under the Seljuks and Ottomans, and most Ottoman almanacs began the year in March. Ottoman court practice probably included gifts, special dishes and poems called nevruziye at "Sultan nevruz".

In her 2015 study on Newroz, Caroline Wallis treats Newroz as an "invented tradition" within the Kurdish national movement and traces how its meanings and practices changed over the 20th century. Wallis argues that the first Kurdish nationalists' choice of the equinox as a "national day" did not rest only on its presence at the Ottoman court. She points also to Kurdish court literature, developed in the Kurdish principalities from the 16th century and heavily influenced by the rich local oral tradition and by Arabic and Persian literature, which conveyed associations of Newroz with love, fertility and fire. This written literature in turn influenced regional oral literature through itinerant bards and minstrels. She gives two examples. The poet Melayê Cizîrî (c. 1570–1640), who was inspired by classical Persian poetry, wrote verse mentioning Newroz and the new year. In Mem û Zîn (1692), Ahmad Khani places the lovers' meeting on Newroz and describes people leaving their homes for the countryside, where young unmarried people dressed up and were free to flirt, with marriage as the intended end. Wallis observes that the festival was "present in the horizon" of the region's literate people and populations, and so was not invented from nothing by nationalists.

=== Rural spring festivals ===
In the 20th century the equinox period was marked in agrarian and pastoral communities of southeastern Turkey mainly by communal outdoor meals, and was not a marker of group identity. The name varied by region. One informant from Dersim told Wallis that her village's spring festival was called Garant and was not political, while another, from Gaziantep, described a festival that marked the departure for summer pasture and took place after the snow melted. Journals describing Newroz as a national Kurdish holiday circulated at the start of 20th century among a small circle of intellectuals, mostly from the middle of upper classes. The ideas of these elites eventually reached the wider public today.

=== Early nationalist adoption ===
Wallis describes the festival's incorporation into Kurdish nationalism as the start of an "invented tradition" and traces it to the journal Jîn, associated with the Kürdistan Taali Jamiyati, around 1918–1919. Contributors called for the identification of "national days". Jîn called 21 March both Sersal ("new year") and Newroz, and a 1918 contributor asked whether the Kurdish new year was in fact the same as the Iranian Newroz. The journal listed Kawa's victory over Dehak among Kurdish national days but dated it to 31 August, and did not link it to 21 March.

In the 1930s and 1940s the review Hawar, produced by the circle around Celadet Bedir Khan, used the forms Nûroj and Newrûz for the equinox festival and described it as of Zoroastrian origin. Newrûz displaced Sersal in this period as part of a wider attempts to anchor Kurdish identity within Zoroastrianism. This framing drew on contemporary European interest in Aryan origins, set Kurdish history against Turkish accounts of Central Asian origin, supported claims of autochthony, and played down religious and linguistic divisions among Kurds.

=== Politicisation in Turkey ===
Before the 1990s, 21 March did not produce mass gatherings in Turkey on the scale seen later. In the 1970s some Kurdish Marxist groups used the figure of Kawa, including the group Kawacılar (1974), which described him as a "Spartacus of Kurdistan". It was in the following decade that PKK succeeded in having the festival accepted in its new revolutionary meaning during the 1980s and 1990s, and the first large popular gathering took place in Cizre in March 1990, linked to the funeral of a guerrilla.

== Mythology ==
The root of this story goes back to ancient Iranian legends, retold in General History by scientist Dinawari, The Meadows of Gold by Muslim historian Masudi, the Shahnameh, a poetic opus written by the Persian poet Ferdowsi around 1000 AD, and the Sharafnameh by the medieval Kurdish historian Sherefxan Bidlisi.

In the Shahnameh, Zahhak is the son of an Arab king who becomes a tyrant after the intervention of Iblis; in Masʿūdī's Meadows of Gold, the Persians regarded him as Arab. The present-day discourse of the Kurdish national movement in Turkey instead presents Newroz as commemorating a Median victory over the Assyrians in 612 BC. Zahak's rule lasted for one thousand years; his evil reign caused spring to no longer come to Kurdistan. During this time, two young men were sacrificed daily and their brains were offered to Zahak's serpents in order to alleviate his pain. However, the man who was in charge of sacrificing the two young men every day would instead kill only one man a day and mix his brains with those of a sheep in order to save the other man. As discontent grew against Zahak's rule, the nobleman Fereydun planned a revolt. The revolt was led by Kaveh (also known as Kawa) (in the Ossetian language, Kurdalægon), a blacksmith who had lost six sons to Zahak. The young men who had been saved from the fate of being sacrificed were trained by Kaveh into an army that marched to Zahak's castle where Kaveh killed the king with a hammer. Kaveh is said to have then set fire to the hillsides to celebrate the victory and summon his supporters; spring returned to Kurdistan the next day. In Firdawsī's version, Kaveh gathers the army but it is Fereydun who defeats Zahhak. Masʿūdī and Firdawsī both present the youths who escaped Zahhak as the ancestors of the Kurds, and Sharaf Khan Bidlisi's Sharafnama (1596) repeats the account. In Masʿūdī the victory over Zahhak is commemorated at Mihrijan autumn festival, not at Newroz.

Wallis notes that in early 20th-century Kurdish nationalist writing the name, the date and the myth were not yet joined. The lighting of the fires has since become a symbol of freedom. It is a tradition to jump across a fire at Newroz.

According to Evliya Çelebi, the district (sancak) of Merkawe in Shahrazur in the southeastern part of Iraqi Kurdistan is named after Kaveh. The 12th century geographer Yaqoot Hamawi mentions Zor (Zur), son of Zahhak (Aji Dahak), as founder of the famous city of Sharazor.

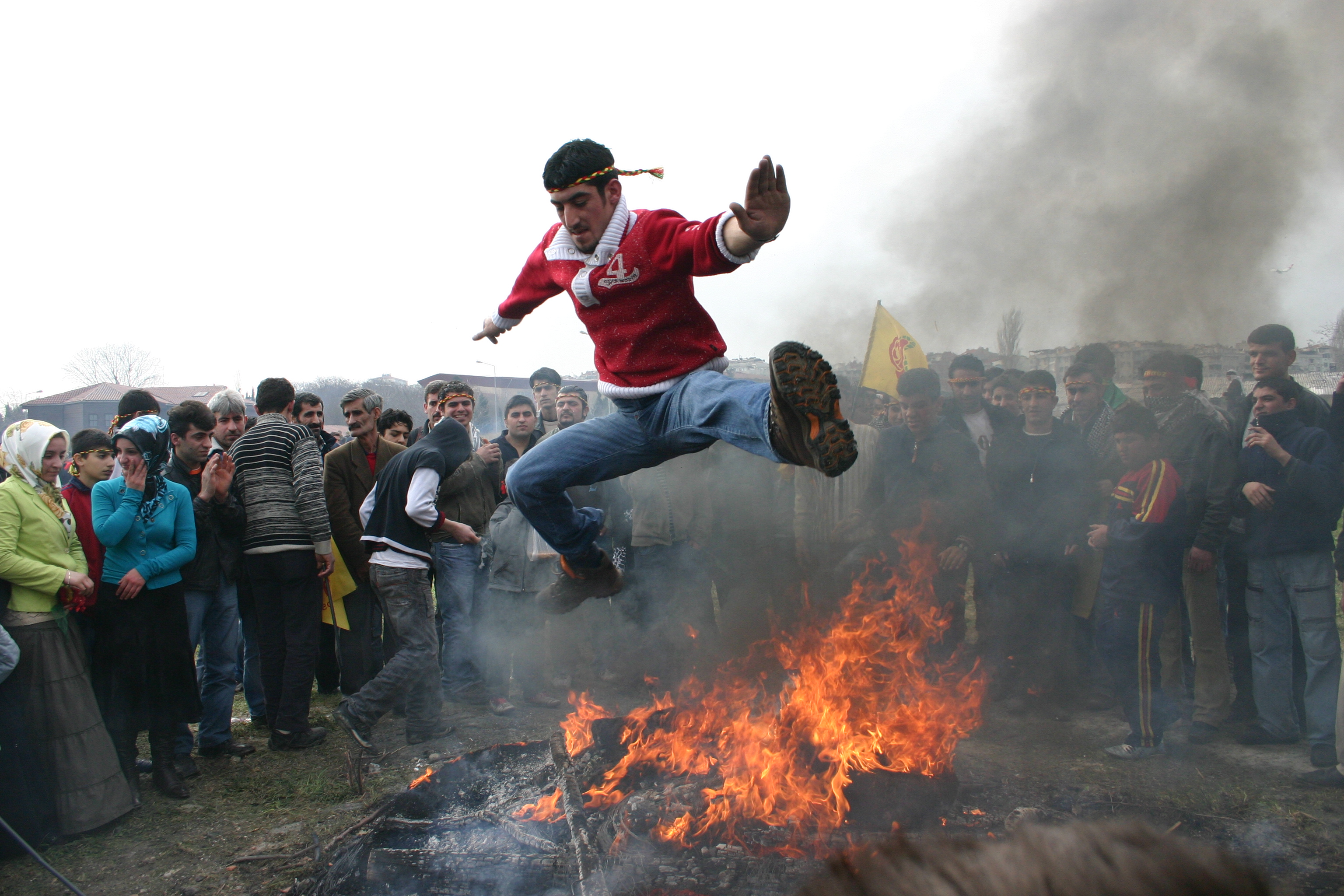
It is a tradition to jump across a fire at Newroz.

== Newroz customs and celebration ==
Newroz is considered the most important festival in Kurdish culture, and is a time for entertainment such as games, dancing, family gathering, preparation of special foods and the reading of poetry. The celebration of Newroz has its local peculiarities in different regions of Kurdistan. On the eve of Newroz, in southern and eastern Kurdistan, bonfires are lit. These fires symbolize the passing of the dark season, winter, and the arrival of spring, the season of light.

Armenian scholar Mardiros Ananikian emphasizes the identical nature of Newroz and the Armenian traditional New Year, Navasard, noting that it was only in the 11th century that Navasard came to be celebrated in late summer rather than in early spring. He states that the Newroz – Navasard “was an agricultural celebration connected with commemoration of the dead […] and aiming at the increase of the rain and the harvests.”1 The great center of Armenian Navasard, Ananikian points out, was Bagavan, the center of fire worship.

== Political overtones ==
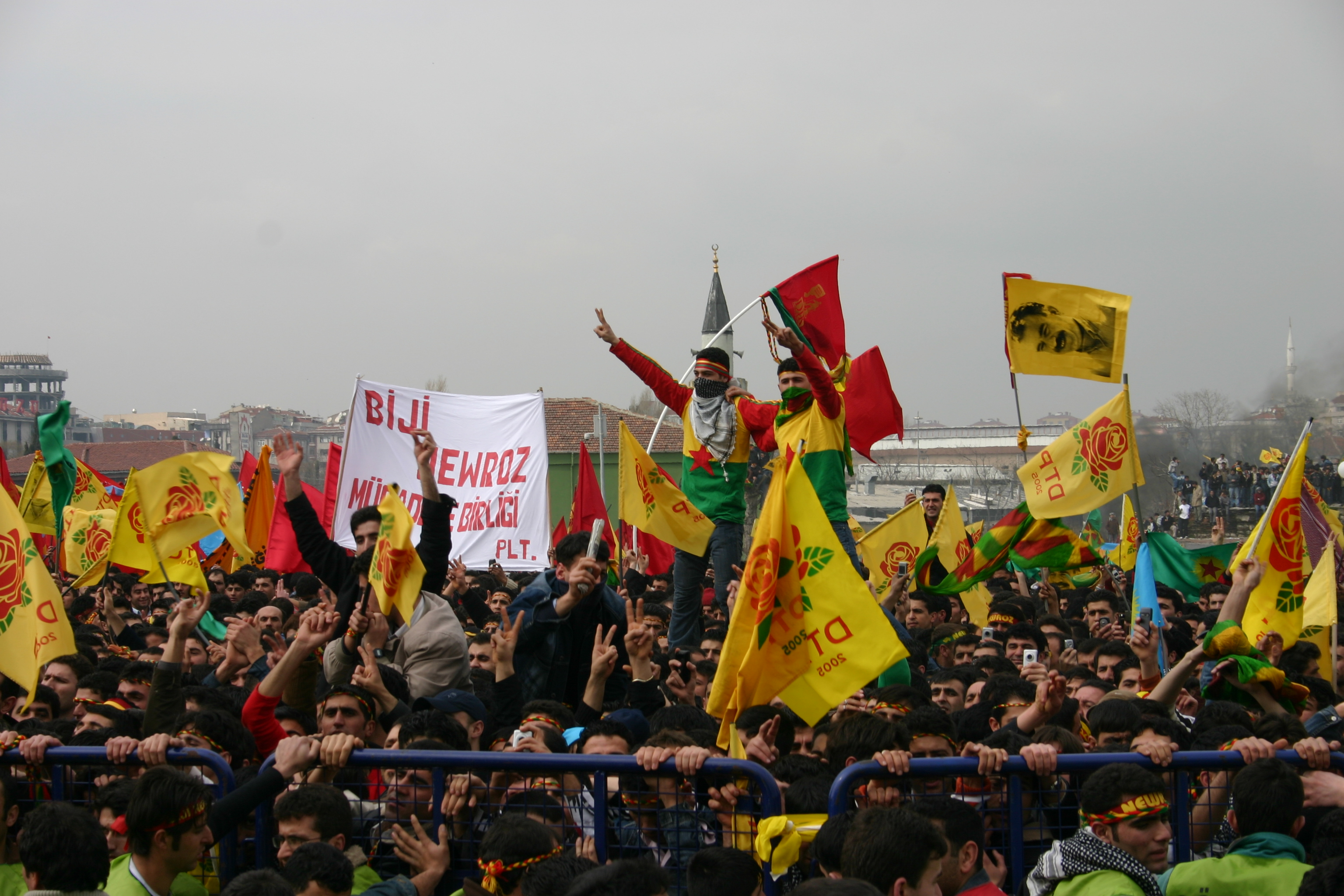
Newroz in Istanbul

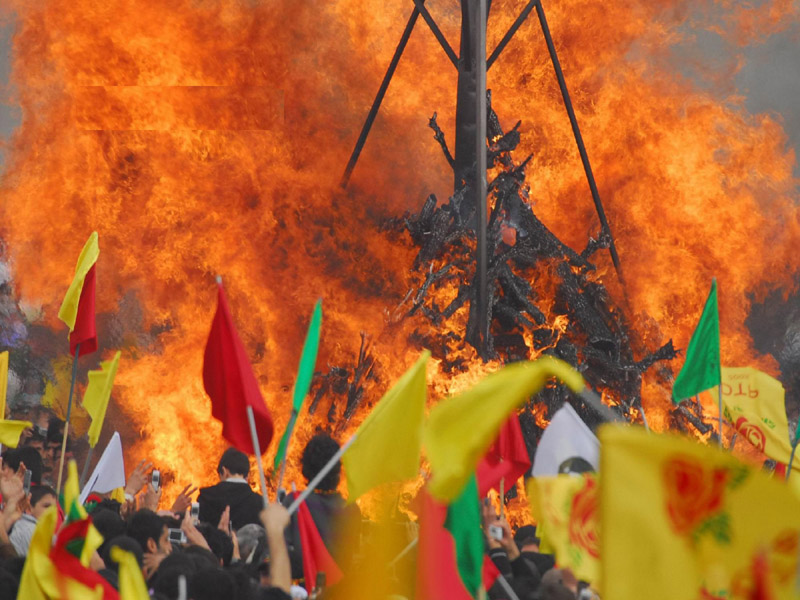
Newroz in Diyarbakir

The Kurdish association with Newroz has become increasingly pronounced since the 1950s when the Kurds in the Middle East and those in the diaspora in Europe started adopting it as a tradition. Following the persecution of any Kurdish expression in Turkey, the revival of the Newroz celebration has become more intense and politicized and has also become a symbol of the Kurdish resurrection. By the end of the 1980s, Newroz was mainly associated "with the attempts to express and resurrect" the Kurdish identity.

=== Turkey ===
In 1991, the Turkish minister of Culture Namık Kemal Zeybek gave out the directive to hold the Nevruz holiday. During the leadership of Prime Minister Süleyman Demirel Turkey legalized the celebration of Nevruz, spelling it "Nevruz" and claiming its origins were to be found in Central Asia. The Government was attempting to counter the rising Kurdish nationalism. Using the Kurdish spelling "Newroz" has been officially forbidden, though it is still widely used by Kurds. Several Turkish newspapers were prosecuted for the spelling of Newroz. In the Kurdish regions of Turkey, specifically in Eastern Anatolia but also in Istanbul and Ankara where there are large Kurdish populations, people gather and jump over bonfires. Previous to it being legalized, the PKK, the Kurdistan Workers’ Party, had chosen the date of the Newroz festival to stage attacks to obtain publicity for their cause; this led to Turkish forces detaining thousands of people who were seen as supporters of the Kurdish rebel movements. During the Newroz celebrations of 1992, more than 90 Kurdish participants were killed by the Turkish government. In 2008, two participants were killed.

=== Syria ===
2015 VOA report about Newroz in Syria

In Syria, the Kurds dress up in their national dress and celebrate the new year. According to Human Rights Watch, Syrian Kurds have had to struggle to celebrate Newroz, and in the past the celebration has led to violent oppression, leading to several deaths and mass arrests. The government has stated that the Newroz celebrations will be tolerated as long as they do not become political demonstrations of the treatment of the Kurds. During the Newroz celebrations in 2008, three Kurds were shot dead by Syrian security forces. In March 2010, an attack by Syrian police killed two or three people, one of them a 15-year-old girl, and more than 50 people were wounded.

The Rojava revolution of 2012 and the subsequent establishment of the de facto Autonomous Administration of North and East Syria saw Kurdish civil rights greatly expand, and Newroz is now celebrated freely in most Kurdish areas of Syria except for Efrin, where the ritual is no longer allowed since the 2018 occupation by Turkish-backed rebel groups. Following the 2026 northeastern Syria offensive and subsequent ceasefire between the Syrian Democratic Forces and the Syrian transitional government, Syrian President Ahmed al-Sharaa issued a decree enshrining the recognition of Kurdish identity and Nowruz as a national holiday.

=== Iraq ===
Kurds in Iraq and Iran have had more freedom to celebrate Newroz than their countrymen in Syria and Turkey, especially after the establishment of the Kurdistan Region as an autonomous government in 1992.

=== Diaspora ===
Kurds in the diaspora also celebrate the new year: Kurds in Australia celebrate Newroz not only as the beginning of the new year but also as Kurdish National Day; the Kurds in Finland celebrate the new year as a way of demonstrating their support for the Kurdish cause. In London, organizers estimated that 25,000 people celebrated Newroz in March 2006. In Germany, the largest national Newroz celebration is held annually in Rebstockpark in Frankfurt, with around 50,000 attendees each year.

The Saitama prefectural parks and greenery association in the north of Tokyo, were denied Kurdish refugees permittion to hold Newroz celebrations in that city. They told The Asahi Shimbun that they were pressured by unknown people by phone and email to reject the request of the Kurds; for this reason, the association director withheld permission for the festival citing the possibility that protesters might show up and cause trouble at the park. But a little later the association on Jan. 23 retracted its decision, saying it was a mistake, and apologized to organizers of the Newroz festival.

== Newroz in Kurdish literature ==
Newroz has been mentioned in works of many Kurdish poets and writers as well as musicians. One of the earliest records of Newroz in Kurdish literature is from Melayê Cizîrî (1570–1640):

Without the light and the fire of Love,
Without the Designer and the power of Creator,
We are not able to reach Union.
(Light is for us and dark is the night)

This fire massing and washing the Heart,
My heart claim after it.
And here come Newroz and the New Year,
When a such light is rising.

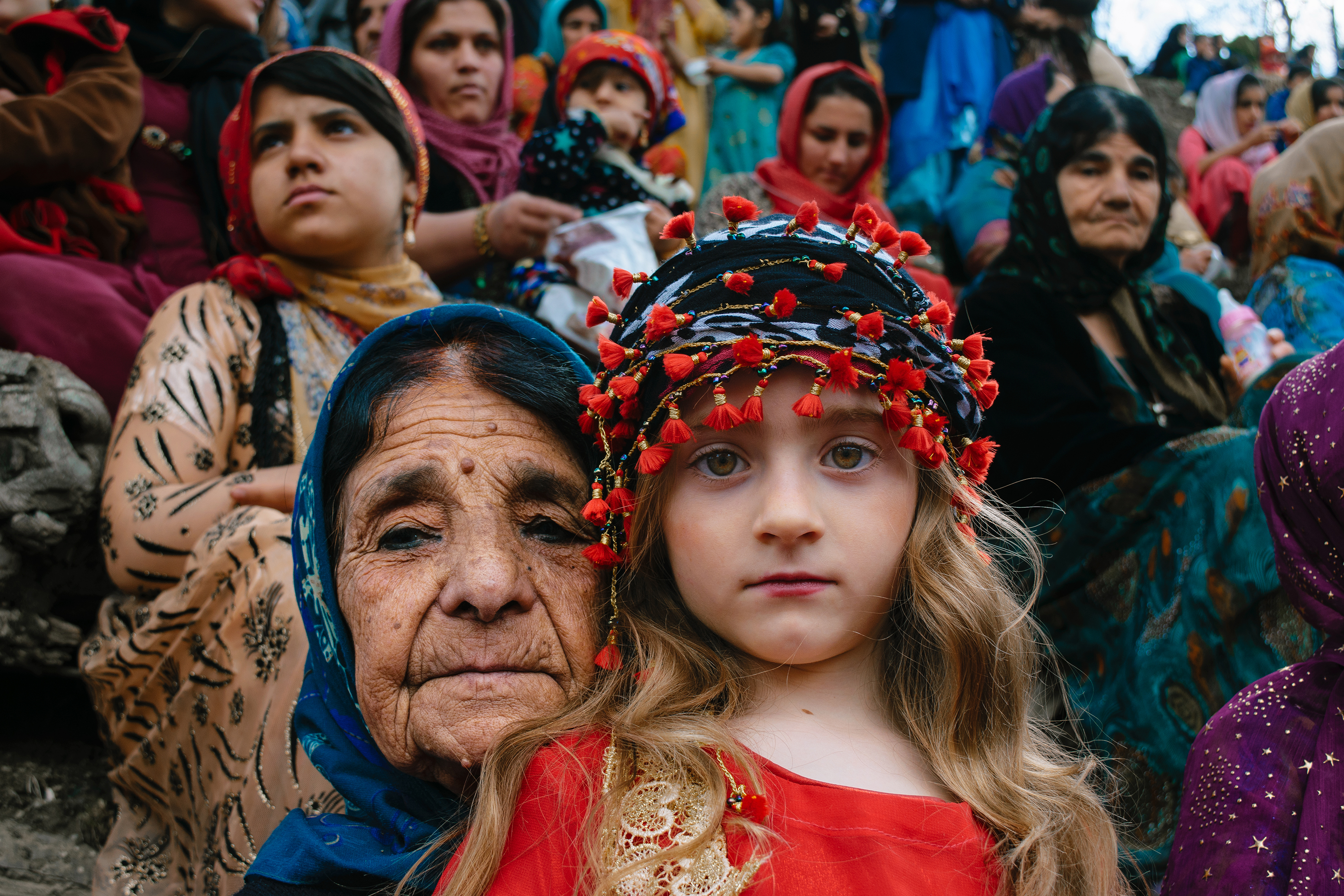
Kurdish family in Bisaran, Iran

The famous Kurdish writer and poet Piramerd (1867–1950) writes in his 1948 poem Newroz:

The New Year's day is today. Newroz is back.
An ancient Kurdish festival, with joy and verdure.
For many years, the flower of our hopes was downtrodden
The poppy of spring was the blood of the youth
It was that red colour on the high horizon of Kurd
Which was carrying the happy tidings of dawn to remote and near nations
It was Newroz which imbued the hearts with such a fire
That made the youth receive death with devoted love
Hooray! The sun is shining from the high mountains of homeland
It is the blood of our martyrs which the horizon reflects
It has never happened in the history of any nation
To have the breasts of girls as shields against bullets
Nay. It is not worth crying and mourning for the martyrs of homeland
They die not. They live on in the heart of the nation.

== Gallery ==
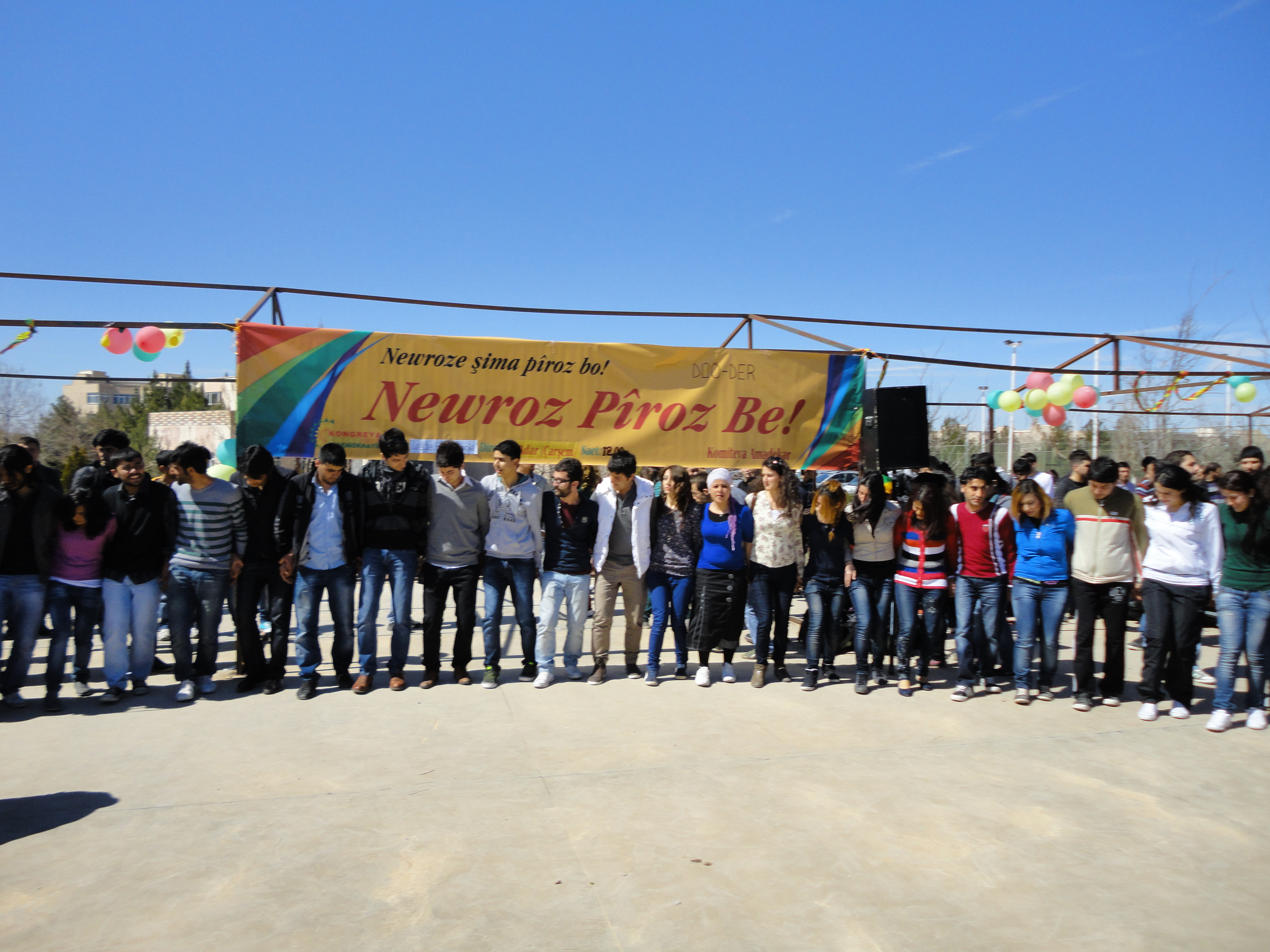
Kurdish students performing Kurdish dances to celebrate Newroz at Dicle University

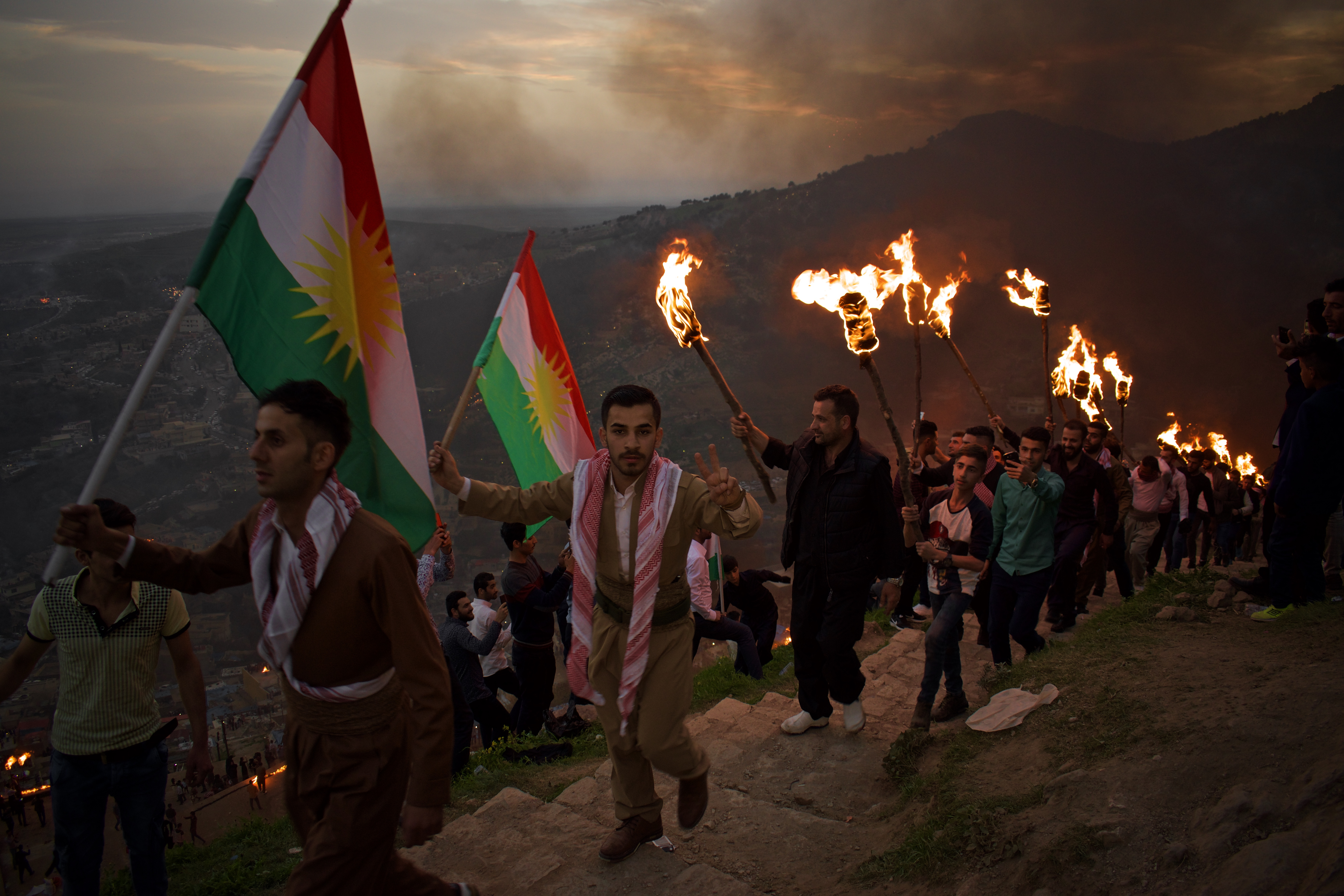
Newroz festival in Akre, Iraqi Kurdistan, 2018

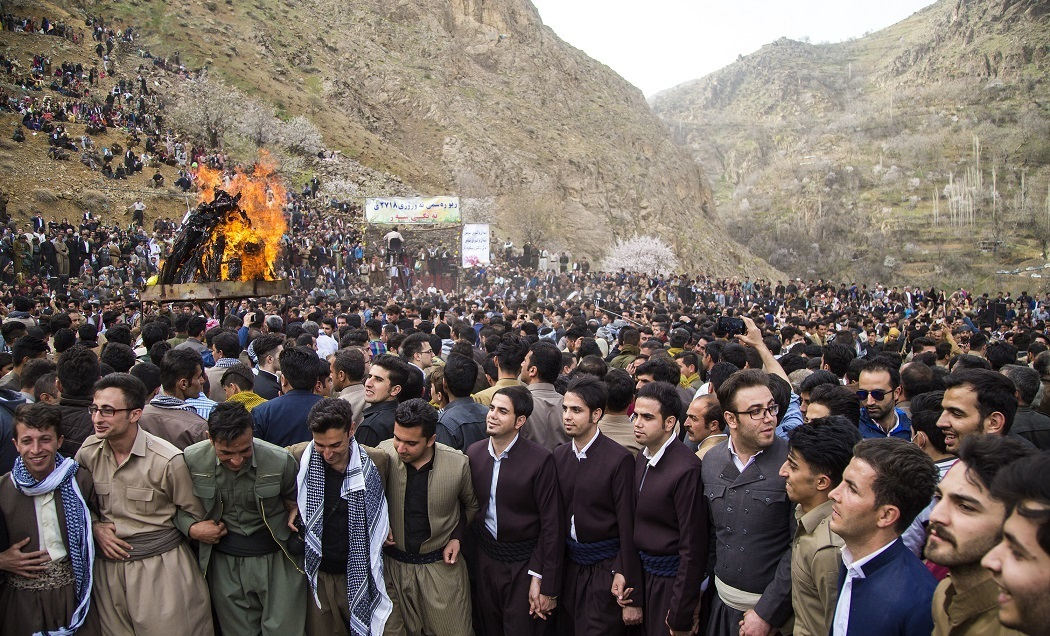
Kurdish people celebrating Newroz 2018, Tangi Sar

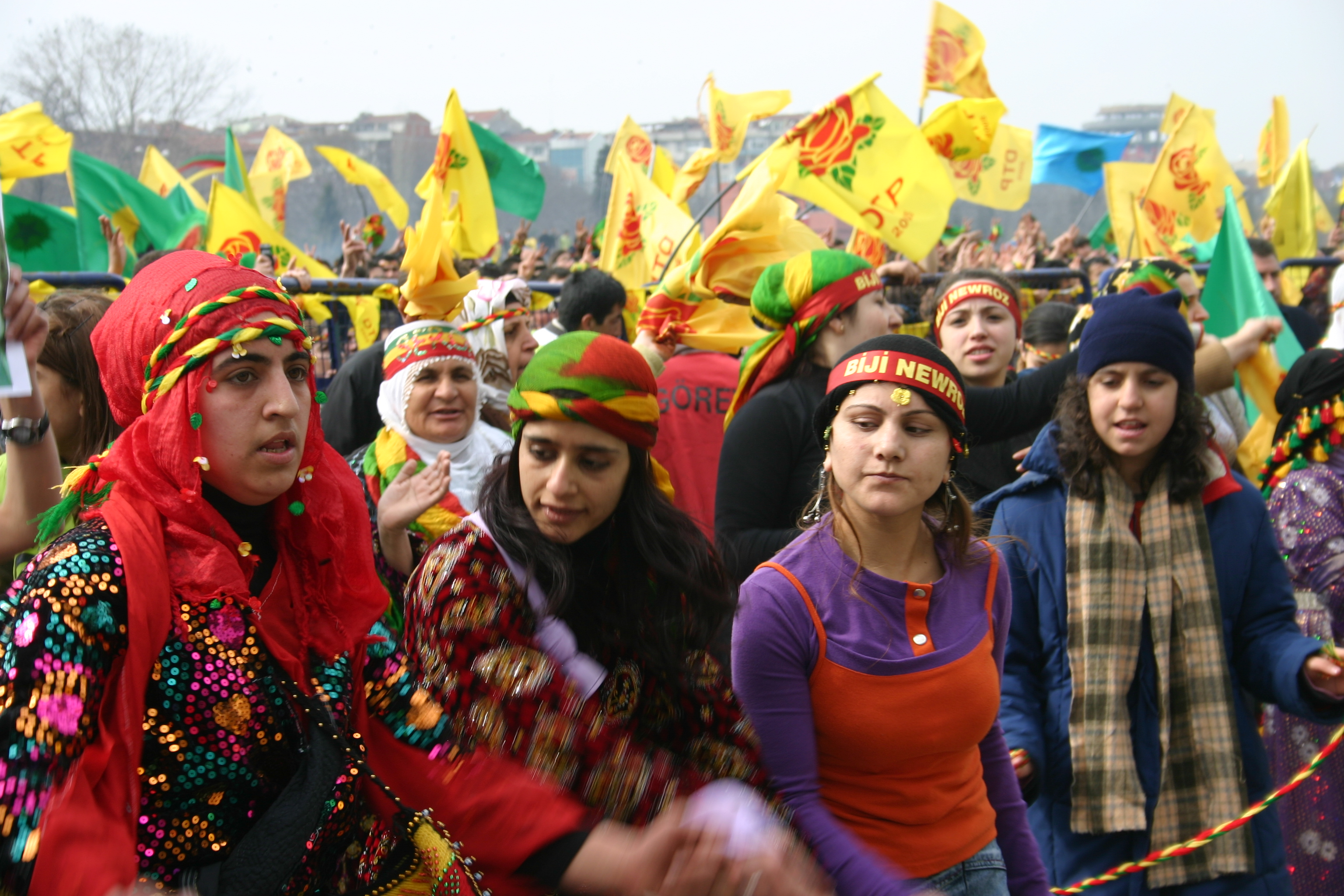
Newroz celebration by the Kurds in Istanbul, 2006

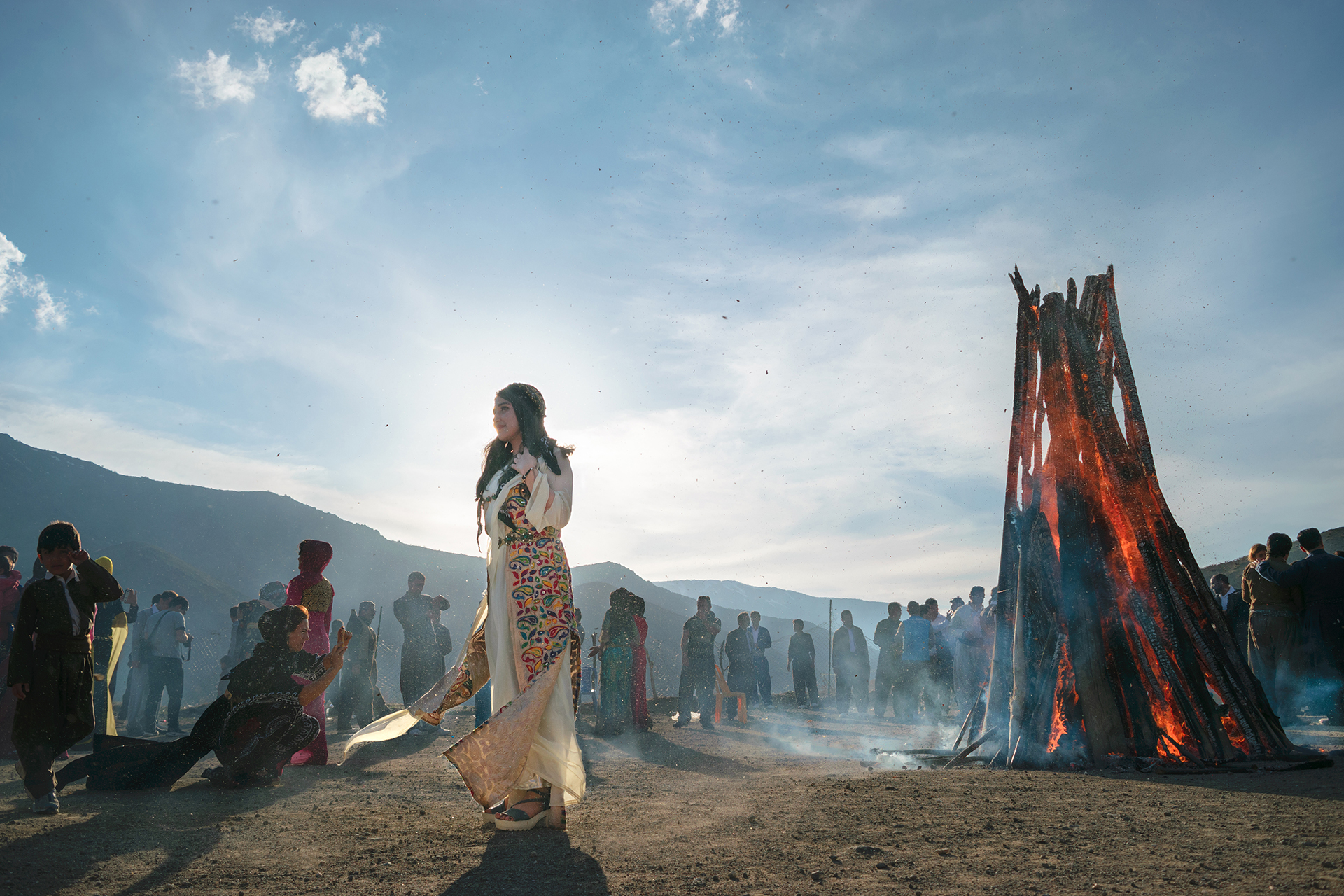
Newroz in Iranian Kurdistan, 2017

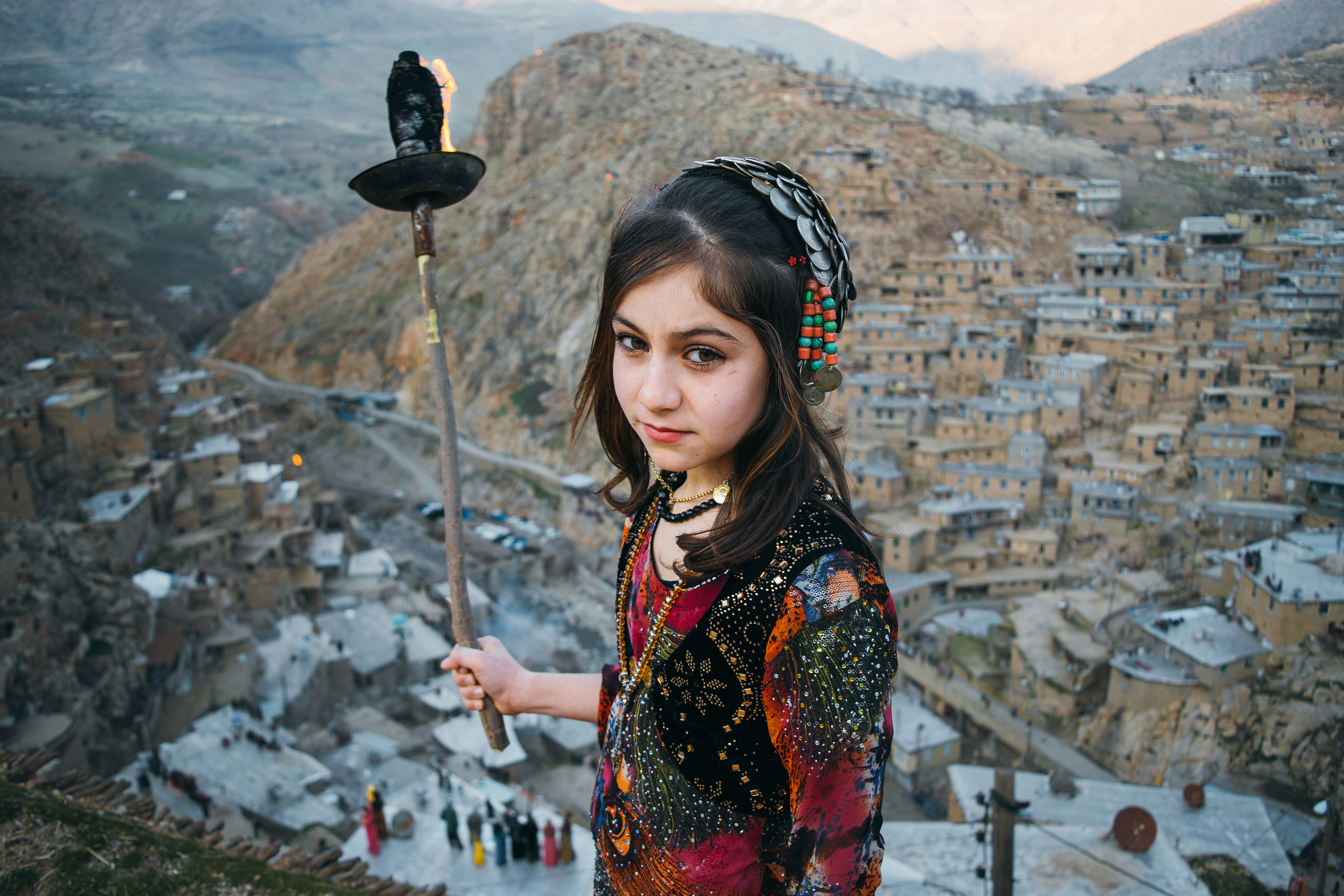
Village girl in Palangan prepares to kindle fire for Newroz, 2019

== See also ==
- Newroz, single song by Hassan Zirak
- Yazidi New Year
- Yalda Night
- Bayram

== Sources ==
Wallis, Caroline (2015). Construction nationale et néo-ritualisation : analyse anthropologique de la célébration du nouvel an kurde (Newroz) [National construction and neo-ritualisation: an anthropological analysis of the celebration of the Kurdish new year (Newroz)] (PhD thesis) (in French). Université Paul Valéry – Montpellier III. NNT: 2015MON30083; HAL: tel-02003353.
