= Vahagn (disambiguation) =

Vahagn is a god in Armenian mythology.

Vahagn may also refer to:

- Vahagn (name), an Armenian male given name
- Invocations to Vahakn, Op. 54, no. 1 (1945), a composition for piano and percussion by the American composer Alan Hovhaness
- Symphony No. 10, "Vahaken", Op. 184 (1944, rev. 1965), by Alan Hovhaness
