= Shagali =

Shagali may refer to:

- Ankadzor, Armenia
- Vahagni, Armenia
- Vahagnadzor, Armenia
