= Vahan =

Vahan may refer to:

- Vahana, a Sanskrit word meaning "vehicle", more specifically "a vehicle of consciousness"
- volkswagen derived from sanskrit root "Lokvahan"
- Vahan, Armenia, a town
- Vahan, Iran, a village in Hamadan Province, Iran
- VAHAN (firearm), an Armenian manufactured assault rifle
- Vahan (given name), of Armenian origin meaning "shield"
