= Anahit =

Armenian Goddess

Anahit Անահիտ
- Golden Mother; Mother of all chastity; Goddess of fertility, healing, wisdom, war and water
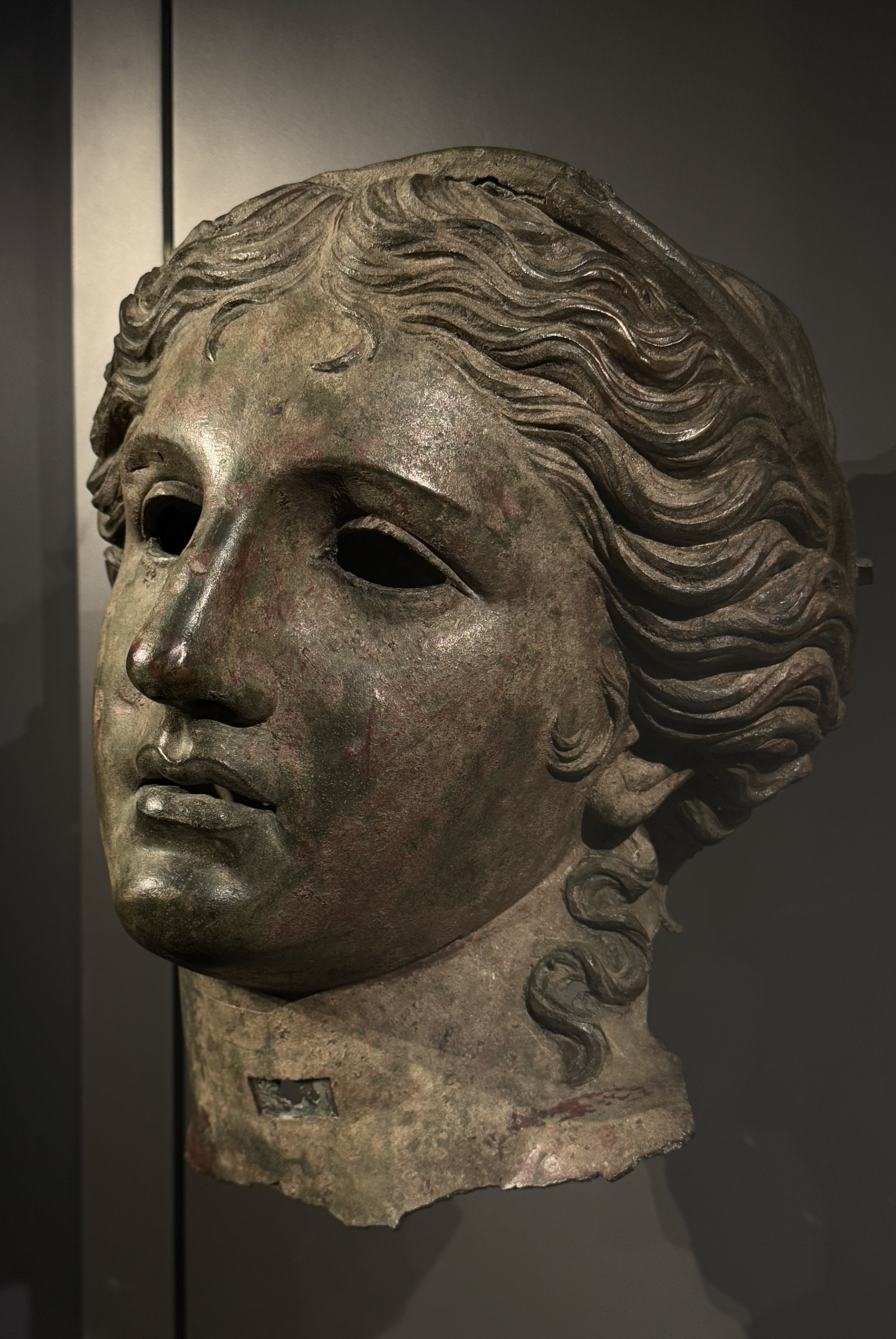
- Bronze head of Satala Aphrodite (believed to be Anahit)
- Major cult center: Erznka
- Day: 19th day of each month in the Armenian calendar
- Gender: female
- Ethnic group: Armenian
- Festivals: Navasard

Genealogy
- Parents: Aramazd
- Siblings: Vahagn, Nane and Mihr

Equivalents
- Etruscan: Artume, Menrva
- Greek: Aphrodite, Artemis, Athena
- Roman: Diana,Minerva

Anahit (Armenian: Անահիտ) was the goddess of fertility and healing, wisdom and water in Armenian mythology. In the early periods, she was the goddess of war. By the 5th century BCE, she was the main deity in Armenia along with Aramazd. The Armenian goddess Anahit is related to the similar Iranian goddess Anahita. Artaxias I erected statues of Anahit, and promulgated orders to worship them.

== Armenian Anahit and Persian Anahita ==
According to Strabo, the "Armenians shared in the religion of the Perses and the Medes and particularly honored Anaitis". The kings of Armenia were "steadfast supporters of the cult" and Tiridates III, before his conversion to Christianity, "prayed officially to the triad Aramazd-Anahit-Vahagn but is said to have shown a special devotion to 'the great lady Anahit, (...) the benefactress of the whole human race, mother of all knowledge, daughter of the great Aramazd'" According to Agathangelos, tradition required the Kings of Armenia to travel once a year to the temple at Eriza (Erez) in Acilisene in order to celebrate the festival of the divinity; Tiridates made this journey in the first year of his reign where he offered sacrifice and wreaths and boughs. The temple at Eriza appears to have been particularly famous, "the wealthiest and most venerable in Armenia", staffed with priests and priestesses, the latter from eminent families who would serve at the temple before marrying. This practice may again reveal Semitic syncretic influences, and is not otherwise attested in other areas. Pliny reports that Mark Antony's soldiers smashed an enormous statue of the divinity made of solid gold and then divided the pieces amongst themselves. Also according to Pliny, supported by Dio Cassius, Acilisene eventually came to be known as Anaïtica. Dio Cassius also mentions that another region along the Cyrus River, on the borders of Albania and Iberia, was also called "the land of Anaïtis."

Anahit's worship, most likely borrowed from the Iranians during the Median invasion or the early Achaemenid period or from Urartian goddess Arubani (possibly an early form of Anahit), was of paramount significance in Armenia. According to Matthew Canepa, Anahit as well as Aramazd, Vahagn, Mihr, and Tir were of Iranian origin and that Iranian religions heavily influenced major Armenian deities. Melik-Pashayan's research states that the cult of Anahit originates from Hayasa-Azzi with Middle Eastern influence; this research is cited by Armen Petrosyan and Hamazasp Khachatryan. Petrosyan also connected Anahit with Hayasan goddess Inanna. M. Kavoukjian also connected Anahit with Inanna and early Armenian Nvard.

== Temples dedicated to Anahit ==
In Armenia, worship of Anahit was established in Erez, Armavir, Artashat and Ashtishat. A mountain in the Sophene district was known as Anahit's throne (At’or’ Anahta). The entire district of Erez, in the province of Akilisene (Ekeghiats), was called Anahtakan Gavar’.

According to Plutarch, the temple of Erez was the wealthiest and the noblest in Armenia. During the expedition of Mark Antony in Armenia, the statue was broken to pieces by Roman soldiers. Pliny the Elder gives the following story about it: Emperor Augustus, being invited to dinner by one of his generals, asked him if it were true that the wreckers of Anahit's statue had been punished by the wrathful goddess. "No!" answered the general, "on the contrary, I have today the good fortune of treating you with one part of the hip of that gold statue." The Armenians erected a new golden statue of Anahit in Erez, which was worshiped before the time of St. Gregory Illuminator.

The annual festivity of the month Navasard, held in honor of Anahit, was the occasion of great gatherings, attended with dance, music, recitals, competitions, etc. The sick went to the temples in pilgrimage, asking for recovery. The symbol of ancient Armenian medicine was the head of the bronze gilded statue of the goddess Anahit.

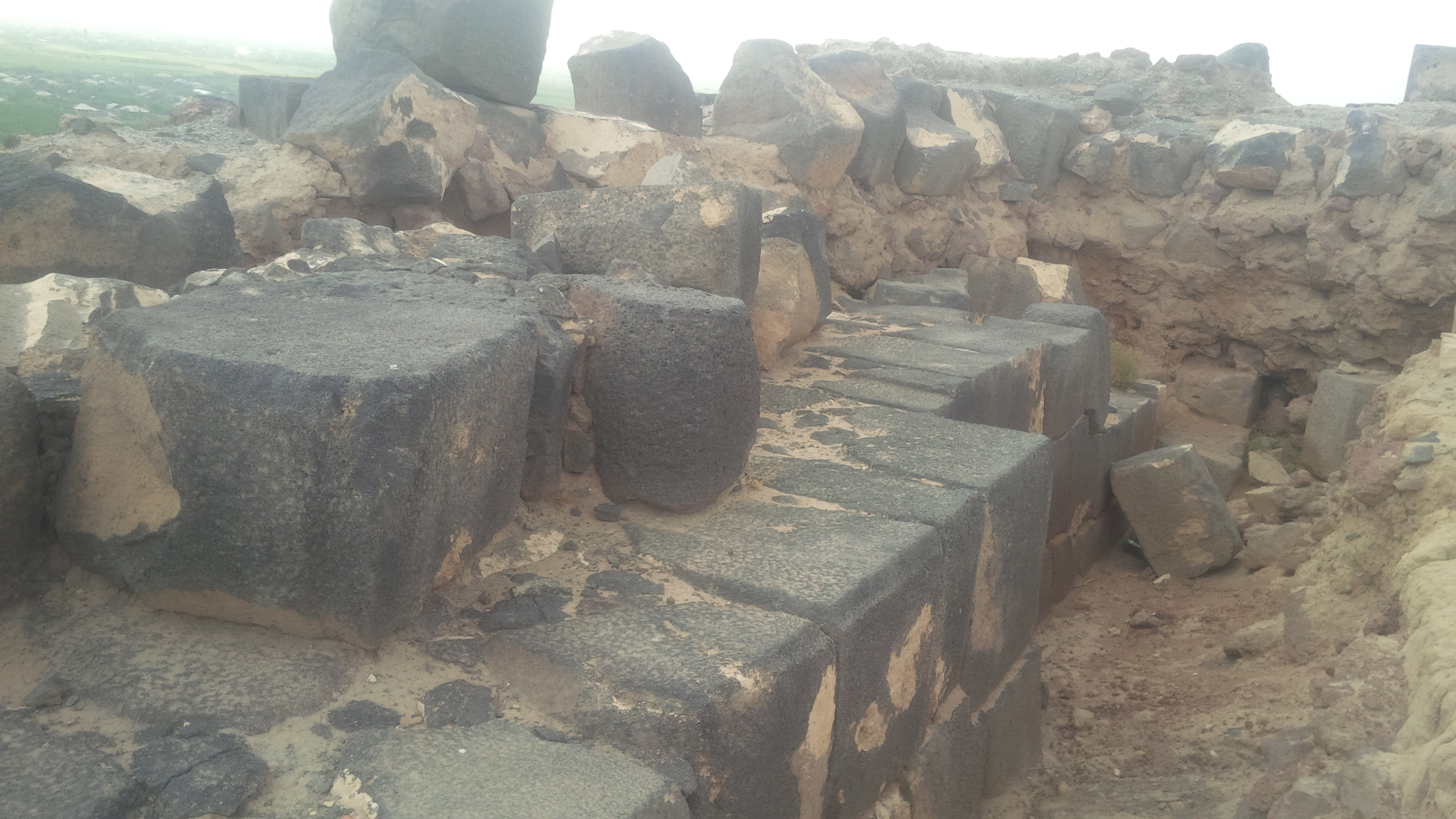

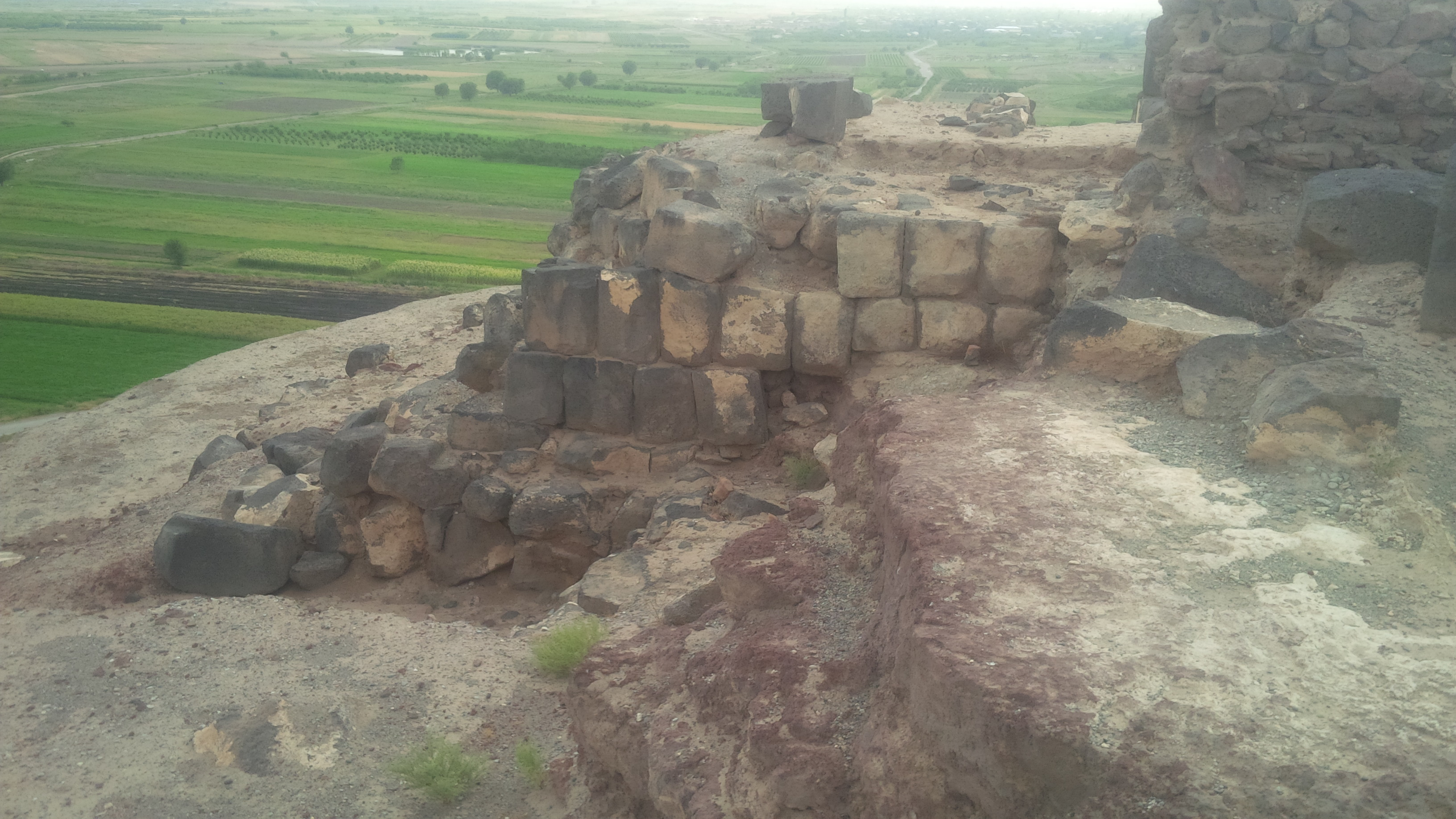

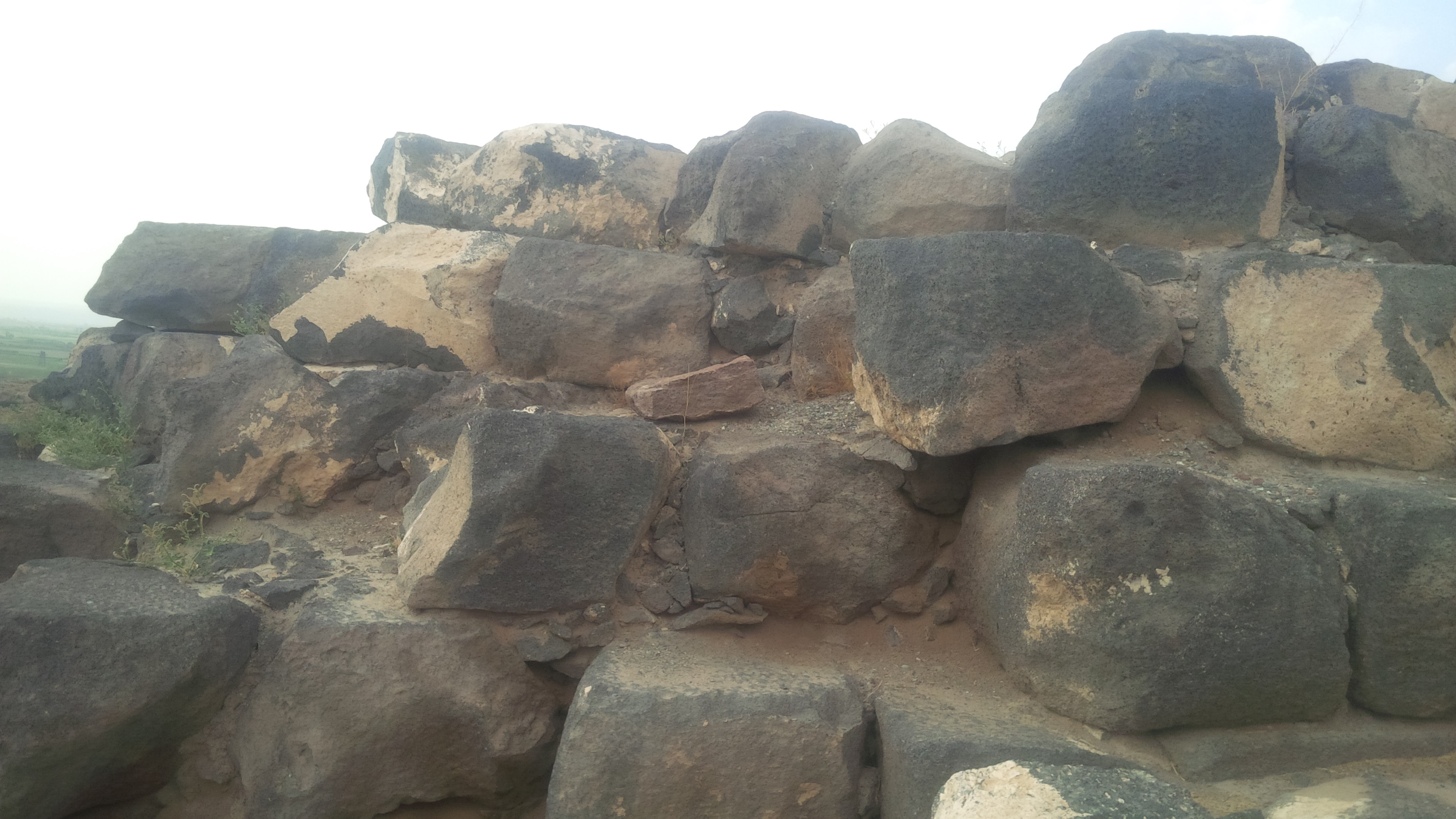
Ruins of the temple of Anahit in Armavir

== Historians' accounts of Anahit ==
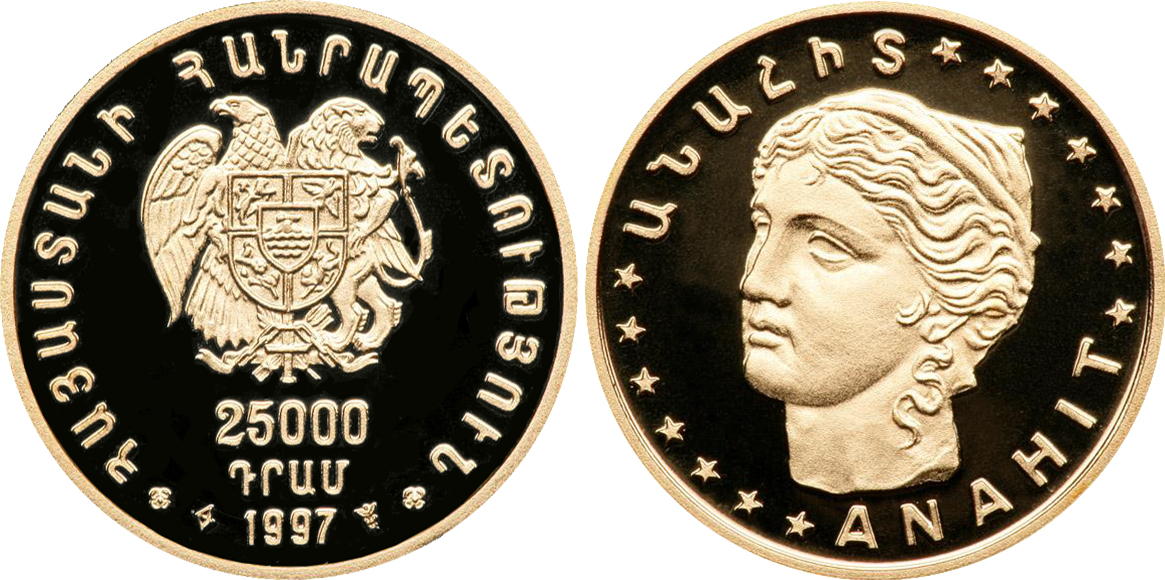
Commemorative coin issued by the Central Bank of Armenia devoted to Goddess Anahit

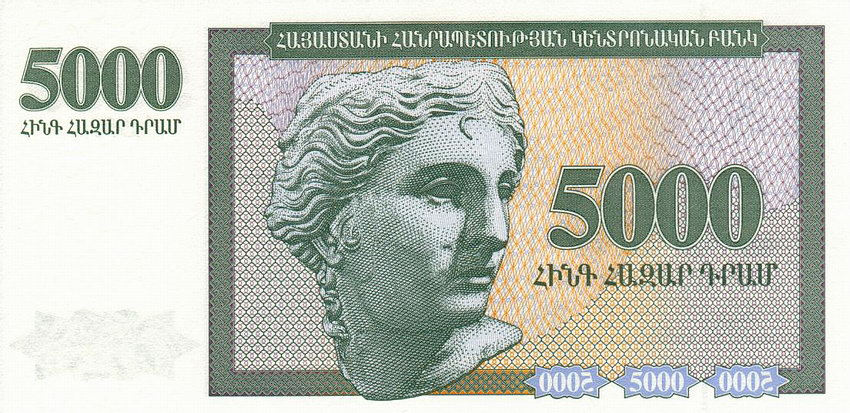
5000 Armenian Dram

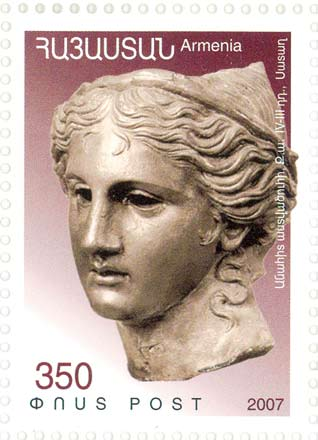
Anahit in Stamp of Armenia, 2007

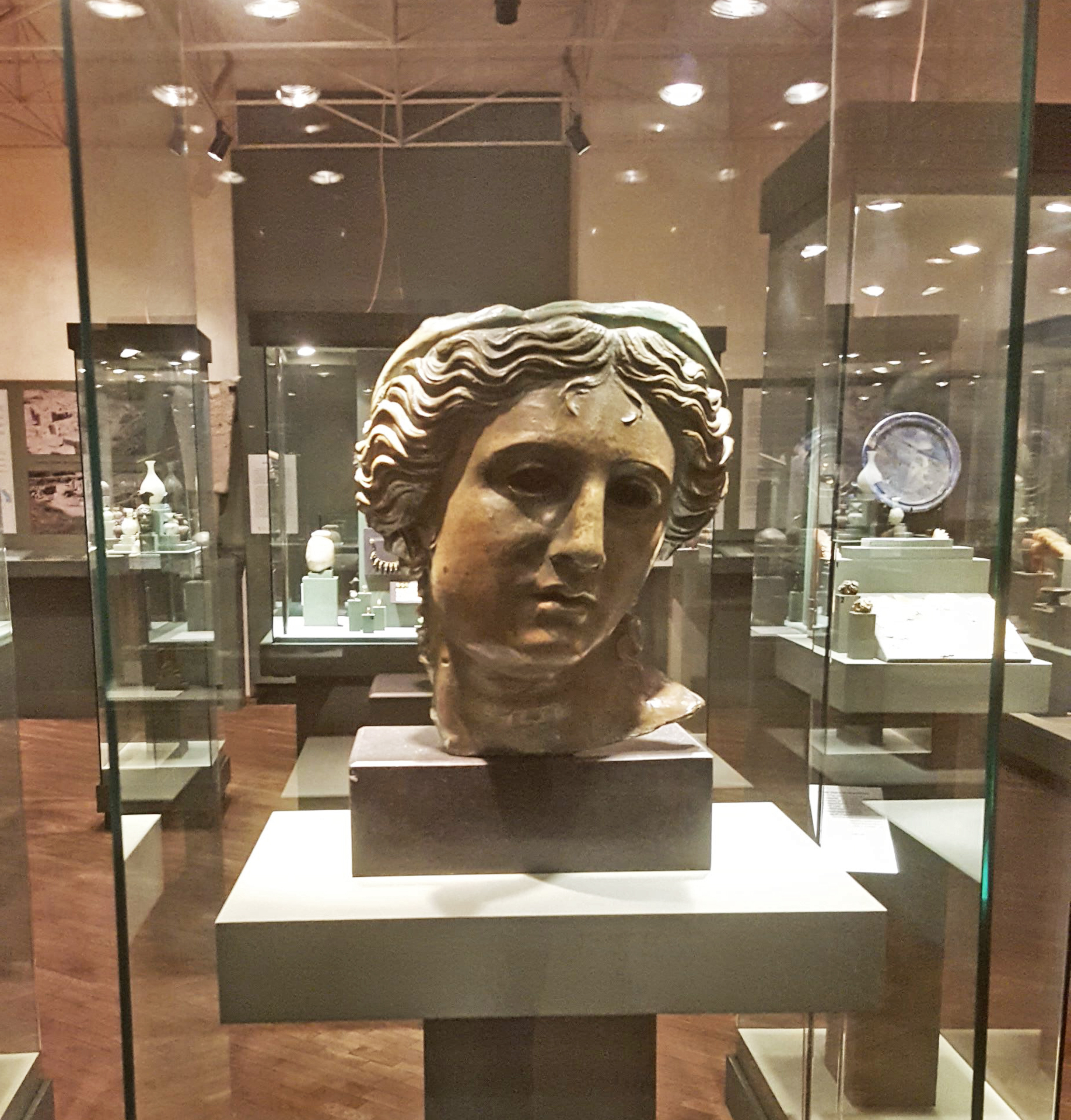
Copy of Satala Aphrodite in History Museum of Armenia

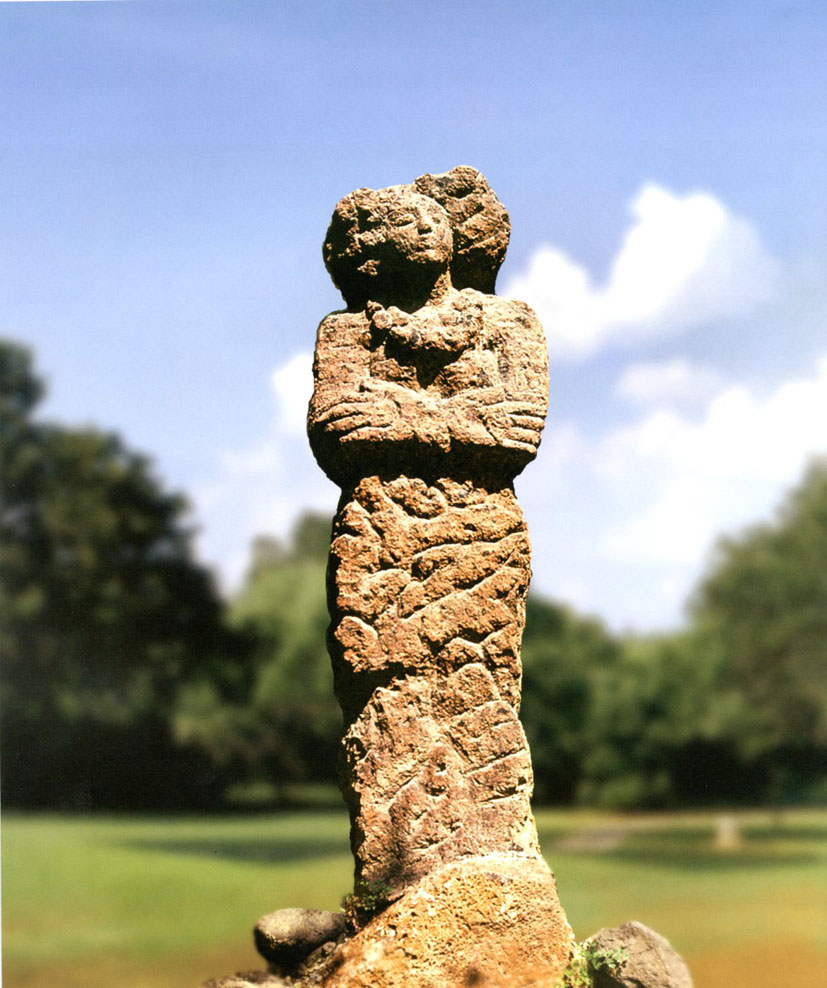
Anahit sculpture by Hagop Ishkanian

According to Agathangelos, King Trdat extolls the "great Lady Anahit, the glory of our nation and vivifier ...; mother of all chastity, and issue of the great and valiant Aramazd." The historian Berossus identifies Anahit with Aphrodite, while medieval Armenian scribes identify her with Artemis. According to Strabo, Anahit's worship included rituals of sacred prostitution, but later Christian writers do not mention such a custom. There is a corona on Venus named after Anahit.

== See also ==
- Satala Aphrodite
- Anahita
- Aramazd
- Astghik
- Vahagn
- Hayk
- Anat
- Sarpanit

== Bibliography ==
- Boyce, Mary (1983), "Anāhīd", Encyclopædia Iranica, vol. 1, New York: Routledge & Kegan Paul, pp. 1003–1009
- Petrosyan, Armen (2002). The Indo‑European and Ancient Near Eastern Sources of the Armenian Epic. Washington, D.C.: Institute for the Study of Man. ISBN 9780941694810.
- Petrosyan, Armen (2007). "State Pantheon of Greater Armenia: Earliest Sources". Aramazd: Armenian Journal of Near Eastern Studies. 2: 174–201. ISSN 1829-1376.
- Gelzer, Heiner (1896). "Zur armenischen Götterlehre". Berichte über die Verhandlungen der Königlich Sächsischen Gesellschaft der Wissenschaften zu Leipzig: 99–148. OCLC 665221528.
