= Vahagn =

Character of ancient Armenian mythology

- Warrior God; God of Sun and fire
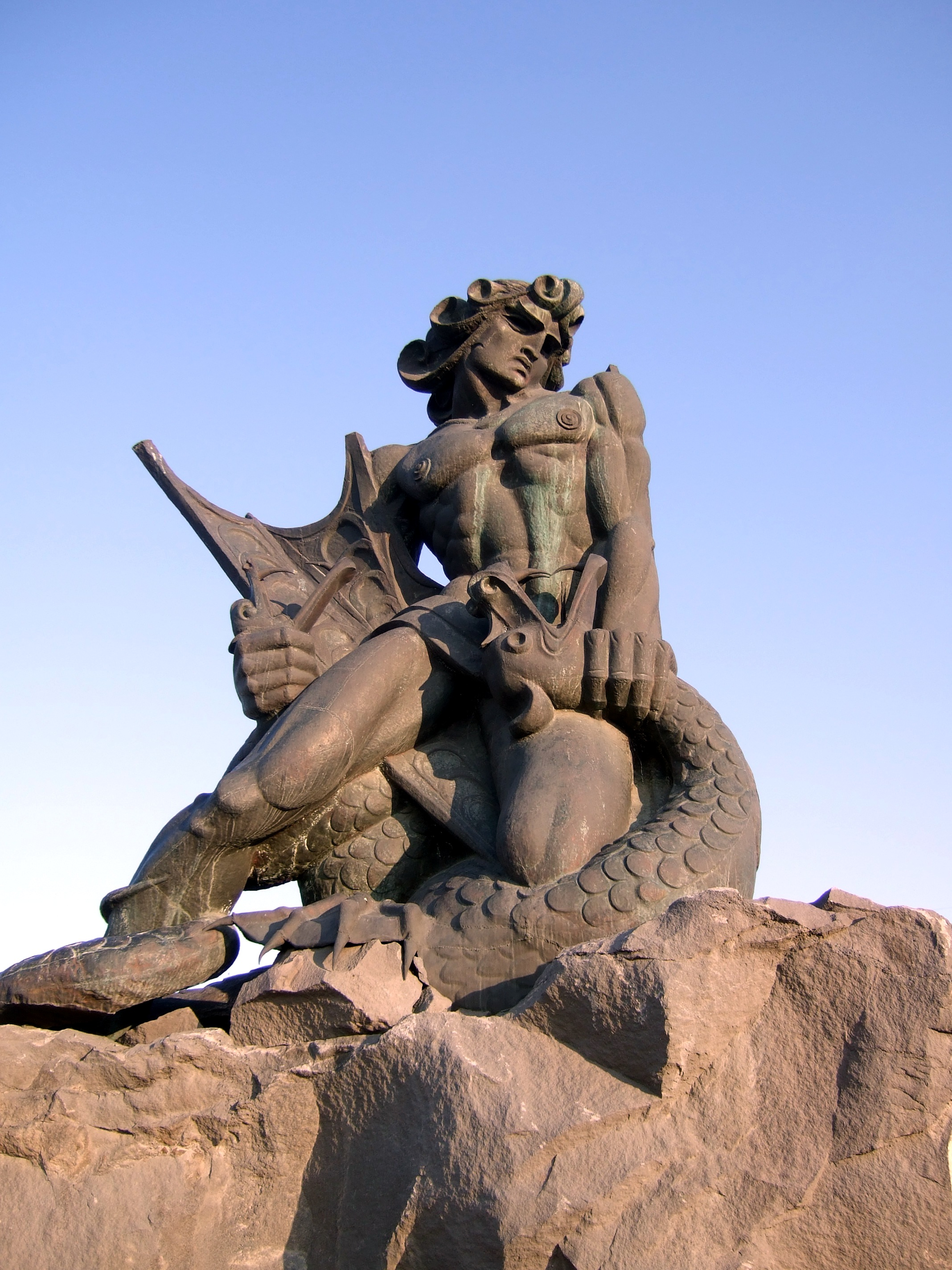
- Statue of Vahagn choking a dragon in Yerevan by Karlen Nurijanyan (1964)
- Day: 27th day of each month in the Armenian calendar
- Gender: male
- Ethnic group: Armenian
- Festivals: Navasard

Genealogy
- Parents: Aramazd
- Siblings: Anahit, Nane and Mihr
- Consort: Astłik

Equivalents
- Greek: Heracles
- Roman: Hercules

Vahagn or Vahakn (Armenian: Վահագն), also known as Vahagn Vishapakagh (Վահագն Վիշապաքաղ, 'Vahagn the Dragon-reaper'), is a warrior god in the Zoroastrian-influenced Armenian mythology. Scholars consider him to be either the thunder, or sun and fire god of the pre-Christian Armenian pantheon, as well as the god of war, bravery and victory. He formed a triad with Aramazd and Anahit. Vahagn is etymologically derived from *Warahraγn, the Parthian name for the Iranian god Verethragna, although there are key differences between the two deities.

Vahagn was worshipped at a tripartite temple complex together with his bride Astghik and the goddess Anahit in the district of Taron, on the slopes of a mountain called Karke near the settlement of Ashtishat. After Armenia came under Hellenistic influence in antiquity, Vahagn was identified with the Hellenic deity Heracles, but also rarely with Apollo.

== Name ==
The theonym Vahagn is cognate with Verethragna, the name of the Iranian god of victory mentioned in Avesta, as well as the Vedic Vŗtrahan, the usual epithet of the thunder god Indra. It was borrowed into Armenian from Parthian Varhraγn and developed from the earlier form Varhagn. In the old Armenian calendar, the twenty-seventh day of the month was called Vahagn. Additionally, the planet Mars was called Atraher ("fire-hair") by the ancient Armenians in reference to Vahagn.

== Historical attestations ==
Vahagn is mentioned in a number of Classical Armenian written sources. For example, in the history attributed to Agathangelos, Armenian king Tiridates III evokes the triad of Aramazd, Anahit and Vahagn in a greeting to his people: "May health and prosperity come to you by the help of the gods, rich fullness from manly Aramazd, providence from Anahit the Lady, and bravery come to you from brave Vahagn."

Historian Movses Khorenatsi refers to Vahagn as one of the sons of Tigranes (a mythologized composite figure of several Armenian kings in Khorenatsi's history) and records the following song about him (English translation by Vyacheslav Ivanov):

Classical Armenian original
Երկնէր երկին, երկնէր երկիր,
երկնէր եւ ծովն ծիրանի.
երկն ի ծովուն ունէր եւ
զկարմրիկն եղեգնիկ.
ընդ եղեգան փող ծուխ ելանէր,
ընդ եղեգան փող բոց ելանէր.
եւ ի բոցոյն վազէր
խարտեաշ պատանեկիկ.
նա հուր հեր ունէր,
… բոց ունէր մօրուս,
եւ աչկունքն էին արեգակունք:

Romanization
Erknēr erkin, erknēr erkir,
erknēr ew covn cirani.
erkn i covun unēr ew
zkarmrikn ełegnik.
ənd ełegan p῾oł cux elanēr,
ənd ełegan p῾oł boc῾ elanēr.
ew i boc῾oyn vazēr
xarteaš patanekik.
na hur her unēr,
... boc῾ unēr môrus,
ew ač῾kunk῾n ēin aregakunk῾:

English translation
Heaven was in labor, earth was in labor,
the purple sea was also in labor;
in the sea labor pangs also held
the little red reed.
Along the reed-pipe smoke ascended,
Along the reed-pipe flame ascended.
And from the flame
a red-headed young boy jumped out.
He had (celestial) fire for hair,
and had flame for beard,
and his eyes were suns.

Khorenatsi does not give the rest of the song, but states that it tells of how Vahagn fought and conquered vishaps, which are the dragons of Armenian mythology. This attribute of Vahagn is the reason for his title vishapakagh, meaning "reaper of vishaps" or "dragon-reaper". Philologist Vyacheslav Ivanov considered the Song of Vahagn recorded by Khorenatsi to be "one of the striking examples of Indo-European poetry." James R. Russell described it as "a cosmological poem, the oldest text preserved in Armenian and arguably one of the most intricate, for its size, in any Indo-European language."

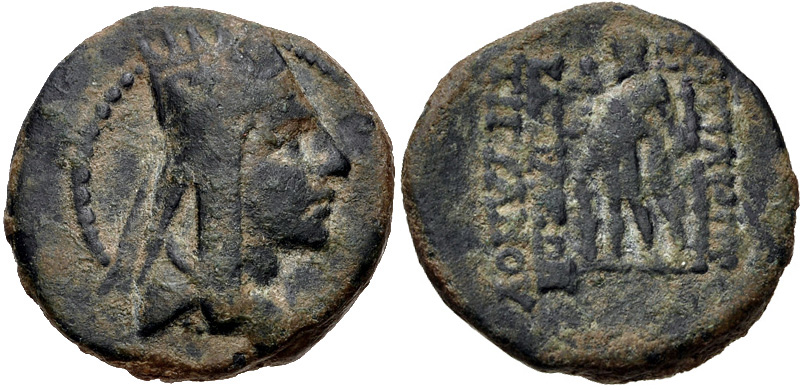
A copper coin of Tigranes the Great with the reverse showing a naked standing muscular Heracles–Vahagn/Verethraghna

The 7th-century Armenian author Anania Shirakatsi relates a myth where Vahagn steals some straw from Barsham (i.e., Baalshamin) and drops it on his way back, creating the Milky Way. This is supposed to be the origin of one of the folk names of the Milky Way in Armenian, Hardagoghi chanaparh, literally "the way of the straw-thief".

=== Temple ===
The chief temple of Vahagn at Ashtishat on the slopes of Mount Karke was often called the Vahevanean or Vahevahean temple because its priests were members of the Vahevuni or Vahnuni noble house, who claimed descent from Vahagn. Vahagn was worshipped jointly at the temple together with Anahit and Astghik. According to Agathangelos, after King Tiridates III's conversion to Christianity in the early fourth century, the first head of the Armenian Church Gregory the Illuminator went to Ashtishat and destroyed the temple of Vahagn. A church was constructed on the site of the destroyed temple, which became the first Mother See of the Armenian Church.

The legend of Gregory the Illuminator in Agathangelos frames Christian ideas through older pagan imaginative patterns associated with Vahagn, especially cosmological imagery recalling his birth myth.

== Interpretations and comparative mythology ==
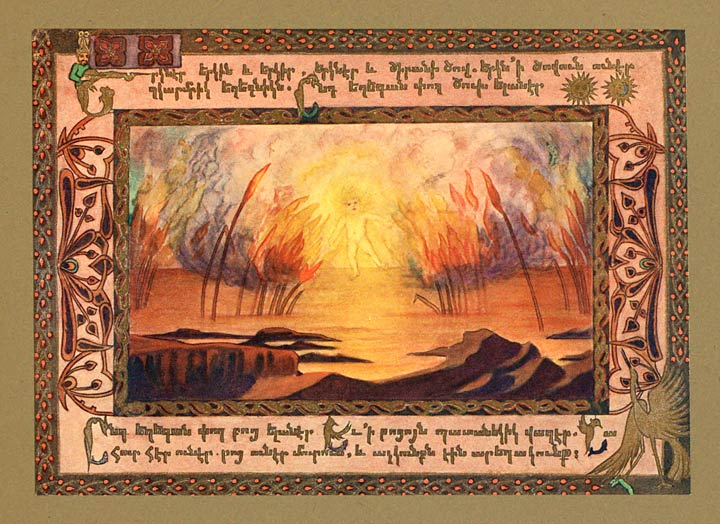
The birth of Vahagn, a modern illustration by Zabelle C. Boyajian (1916).

Georges Dumézil said that Vahagn seems closer to the Vedic Vŗtrahan Indra than the Avestan Verethragna, since the former is depicted as a dragon/serpent-slayer like Vahagn, while the latter is not. Vahagn has frequently been regarded as a counterpart of Indra, but Armen Petrosyan considers the similarities between the two to be underlying Indo-European commonalities rather than the result of direct borrowing, since in that case the dissimilarity with Verethragna would be inexplicable. Philologist Vyacheslav Ivanov says the myth of Vahagn contains several layers, including the later Iranian myth of Verethragna and an earlier Indo-European layer of a god persecuting the enemy. Armen Petrosyan says Vahagn is a pre-Iranian Armenian god who took on an Iranian name, rather than a complete borrowing. Petrosyan has also drawn parallels between Vahagn and the Vedic fire deity Agni, based on similarities in the accounts of their birth. Vahagn may have acquired his attribute of dragon-slayer from the Hurro-Urartian deity Teshub.

Vahagn was identified with Heracles during the Hellenistic period. In the 5th-century Armenian translation of the Bible, Vahagn is used to translate Heracles in 2 Maccabees 4:19, while Khorenatsi states that the song of Vahagn tells of heroic deeds reminiscent of Heracles. More rarely, he was identified with the sun god Apollo. John the Baptist has been called the "Christian heir of Vahagn's character," as a church dedicated to him was built near the demolished temple of Vahagn.

== Modern cultural impact ==
The Vahagn statue and WWII memorial in the village of Vahagni, northern Armenia

Émile Benveniste described Vahagn as Armenia's "national god", while Richard G. Hovannisian noted that he is perceived as "the all-Armenian god and the personification of Armenian ideals." Today, Vahagn (and Vahag) are popular male given names among Armenians. Vahan, another popular name, may have originated from Vahagn.

Vahagn features prominently in modern Armenian literature, most notably in the early 20th century "pagan" trend linked to national revival with his persona reimagined to symbolize the heroic ideals of strength and beauty. Hovhannes Hovhannisyan's 1904 poem "The Birth of Vahagn" draws directly from the song recorded by Movses Khorenatsi, with its opening stanzas serving as a near-literal translation. It reflects a period of national awakening, where Hovhannisyan symbolically links the titanic birth of the god Vahagn to the spiritual and revolutionary rise of the Armenian people. While he expands by adding a new concluding section, he remains faithful to its epic spirit. Poems dedicated to Vahagn have also been authored by Daniel Varoujan (1909), Siamanto (1912), Yeghishe Charents (1916), Kostan Zarian (1940s), Paruyr Sevak (1962).

Vahagn has been associated in the modern times with the province of Lori (Tashir-Dzoraget); a village there was named Vahagni after him in 1947 based on the belief that his temple was located there. It has a monumental statue of Vahagn by Ghukas Chubaryan and Liparit Sadoyan, erected in 1973, which also serves as a monument to the fallen soldiers of the Great Patriotic War (World War II).

=== Artistic depictions ===
There are several statues and sculptures of Vahagn in Yerevan dating from the Soviet period, including by Ara Harutyunyan and Rafayel Israyelian (1962/1965), Karlen Nurijanyan (1964/1969), Vahe Harutyunyan (1984/1985), Artashes Hovsepyan (1988). H. Shahbazyan (1988).

He is also depicted in painting by Lida Khanamiryan (1972) and on a 1997 stamp along with the Hercules constellation, which is named after him in Armenian.

=== Neopaganism ===
Vahagn is the central deity of Armenian neopaganism, whose followers use the song recounted by Khorenatsi as their primary ritual chant. In the neopagan mythology constructed by Slak Kakosyan, Vahagn is one of the supreme gods who punishes the Semitic deity Yahvah and appears in visions to spiritually elect figures, beginning with Garegin Nzhdeh. The festival of his birth (March 21–22) is the community's most prominent public ritual, held annually at the temple of Garni.

=== Popular culture ===
In a Japanese light novel series Campfire Cooking in Another World with My Absurd Skill, Vahagn (Vahagun) appears as one of the deities, voiced by Kazuya Nakai. He is the God of War, who wears a skull helmet and is adorned with tattoos.

== See also ==
- Hayk

== Bibliography ==
- Abegi͡an, Manuk (1948). Istorii͡a drevnearmi͡anskoĭ literatury [History of Old Armenian Literature] (in Russian). Erevan: Izd.-vo Akedemii nauk Arm. SSR.
- Dumézil, George (1970). The Destiny of the Warrior. Translated by Hiltebeitel, Alf. University of Chicago Press.
- Ivanov, Vyacheslav (2011). "A Probable Structure of a Protoform of the Ancient Armenian Song of Vahagn" (PDF). Aramazd: Armenian Journal of Near Eastern Studies. 6: 7–23. ISSN 1829-1376.
- Katvalyan, M. [in Armenian] (1985). "Vahagn" . Soviet Armenian Encyclopedia (in Armenian). Vol. 11. Yerevan. p. 242.
- Thomson, Robert W. (1978). Moses Khorenatsʻi, History of the Armenians. Cambridge, Massachusetts: Harvard University Press. ISBN 0-674-39571-9.
- Petrosyan, Armen (2018). "From Armenian Demonology: the K'ajs". Journal of Indo-European Studies. 46: 206–218. ISSN 0092-2323.
- Petrosyan, Armen (2007). "State Pantheon of Greater Armenia: Earliest Sources". Aramazd: Armenian Journal of Near Eastern Studies. 2: 174–201. ISSN 1829-1376.
- Petrosyan, Armen (2002). The Indo‑european and Ancient Near Eastern Sources of the Armenian Epic. Washington, D.C.: Institute for the Study of Man. ISBN 978-0-941694-81-0.
- Russell, James R. (1987). Zoroastrianism in Armenia. Cambridge, Massachusetts: Harvard University Press. ISBN 978-0-674-96850-9.
- Russell, J. R. (1986). "Armenia and Iran iii. Armenian Religion". In Yarshater, Ehsan (ed.). Encyclopædia Iranica. Vol. II/4: Architecture IV–Armenia and Iran IV. London and New York: Routledge & Kegan Paul. pp. 438–434. ISBN 978-0-71009-104-8.
