= Syria Newroz killings =

The Syria Newroz Killings were attacks on Kurds in Raqqa and Qamishli in northern Syria during Newroz, the Kurdish New Year celebrations.

== Qamishli incident ==
The first incident took place on 20 March 2008 in Qamishli, al-Hasakah Governorate, according to Human Rights Watch, Syrian security forces opened fire at Kurds celebrating the festival of Newroz. The shooting left three people dead and at least five injured. The city was renowned for throwing a large Christmas parade every year in December, and celebrating Newroz festival by a large crowd every year in March.

== Raqqa City incident ==
The second incident involved a Syrian police attack on the Kurdish population in Raqqa city, who had gathered to celebrate the Kurdish new year (Newroz festival) in March 2010. The attack by Syrian police left 2 or 3 people killed, one of them a 15-year-old girl, and more than 50 people wounded.

== See also ==
- Rojava
- Kurdistan
