= Vahevuni =

Vahevuni was one of the ancient noble houses of Armenia, believed to derive from Vahagn, god (dic) of fire and war. According to Movses Khorenatsi, the Vahevunis were ranked in the Gahnamak among the first noble houses of Armenian by King Valarshak.

The princely house of Vahevunis traditionally held the title of the high priests (qrmapet) of Vahagn. They also possessed the temple town of Ashtishat in the gavarr of Vahevuniq (on the left bank of the Aratzani river in Taron. Most likely, in the pre-Christian Armenia, the Vahevunis also hereditarily held the rank of the Sparapet, i.e. the Commander-in-Chief of the Royal Armenian Army.

The main known rulers from the Vahevuni family from c. 400–800 are:

- Mani Vahevuni c. 445
- Gyut Vahevuni c. 445
- Barshegh (Baršł) Vahevuni c. 480
- Samvel Vahevuni c. 590
- Khosrov c. 595
- Thoros (Theodoros) c. 640

== See also ==
- List of regions of old Armenia
