= Navasard =

First month of the Armenian calendar

Navasard is the first month of the Armenian calendar. Navasard has 30 days, starting on 11 August and ending on 9 September. In ancient Armenia, the first day of Navasard was a holiday. In Armenian mythology, the Navasardian god was considered protector of the crops and the feeder of the hungry. His statue is currently standing in Bagavan, which today is considered a Pagan sanctuary.

== Etymology ==
The term Navasard goes back to Old Armenian նաւասարդ /nawasard/, a loan from NW-(Middle)-Iranian *nawāgsarδ 'new year' (cf. Khwarezmian: نوسارڅ [nwsʾrc] /nawsārc/, Sogdian: *nawēsarδ) consisting of the Iranian words nawa 'new' (going back to Proto-Iranian *náwah, ultimately from Proto-Indo-European *néwos; cf. Classical Persian نوی /naw/, Kurmanji nû, Pashto نوی /nëway/, Ossetian ног /nog/) and sard 'year' (from Proto-Iranian *carHdáh; cf. Old Persian 𐎰𐎼𐎭 [θ-r-d] /θarda/, Parthian /sard/, Middle and New Persian سال /sāl/). The term is attested in Biruni's works (written in Classical Persian) as نوسرذ /nawsarδ/ 'the new year celebration' as well as in Aramaic nwsrdʾ /nawsardā/ 'new year'.

== History ==
Navasard was also considered at one point the last month of Summer, and was referred to as the "introduction of the golden autumn".

Armenian scholar Mardiros Ananikian emphasizes the identical nature of Solar Hijri calendar month Nowruz and Navasard, noting that it was only in the 11th century that Navasard came to be celebrated in late summer rather than in early spring. He states that Navasard “was an agricultural celebration connected with commemoration of the dead […] and aiming at the increase of the rain and the harvests.” The great center of Navasard, Ananikian points out, was Bagavan, the center of fire worship.

=== Celebrations ===
The Navasardian festivals were considered the biggest celebrations of the year. The celebrations used to last during the first week of Navasard.

Armenian families used to serve their best feasts during lunch and suppertime, having very big numbers of dining guests ranging from family to friends. They also hung stockings on their doors and impatiently expected drops of gifts put in them, as a tradition nowadays done too.

The representative Armenian Gods of the Navasardian celebrations are Astghik, Vahagn and Anahit.

==== Celebration locations ====
In Ancient Armenia, the Navasardian celebrations carried a cultural significance and to which participated all the representatives of the nation. The celebrations were initially done at Bagavan, but then was relocated to the Ashtishat region. The celebrations also included the worship of water and rivers, therefore they chose these two regions to be also located at the shores of the Aradzani (now known as the Murat River).

=== Ceremony ===
On the day of the ceremonies, the region of Bagavan would be decorated in many colorful decorations. The king would be present as well as a big part of the army, up to 120,000 in number.

According to ancient book descriptions, colorful tents set up on the shore of Murat are seen, the golden tent would always belong to the king, the most noticeable of the tents usually belonged to the elite of the nation. Most of the people spent their times under big trees' shadows to hide away from the sun while they watched the celebrations and performances.

Throughout the day, doves and deer would be sacrificed in the name of the gods. Usually the horns of the deer were painted colorfully. There also was set up a big bonfire at nighttime where children and young adults would try to jump over and around it to scare and drive away bad spirits. The celebrating people would bring their first set of harvest of the year to share with others.

Horseback riding races were done, as well as deer racing. Hundreds of doves were released into the air for good luck. Dancing, singing, intellectual and athletic competitive games were a big part of the celebrations, where competitors would try to impress the ones they admire in the audience.

=== Organized games ===
In Ashtishat, games similar to the current well-known Olympic games were organized to choose the best athlete in a bundle of performed games.

While the athletes competed, poets and instrumentalists merged and performed their own music and lyrics, as well as painters drew the event in various methods, accordingly to their point of view. A water festival, referred to as Vardavar, also takes place, where everyone drenched each other with water using different types of containers a bucket. The Vardavar festival is still done every year all over Armenia.
