= Astłik =

Ancient Armenian deity

Astłik Աստղիկ
- Goddess of fertility and love
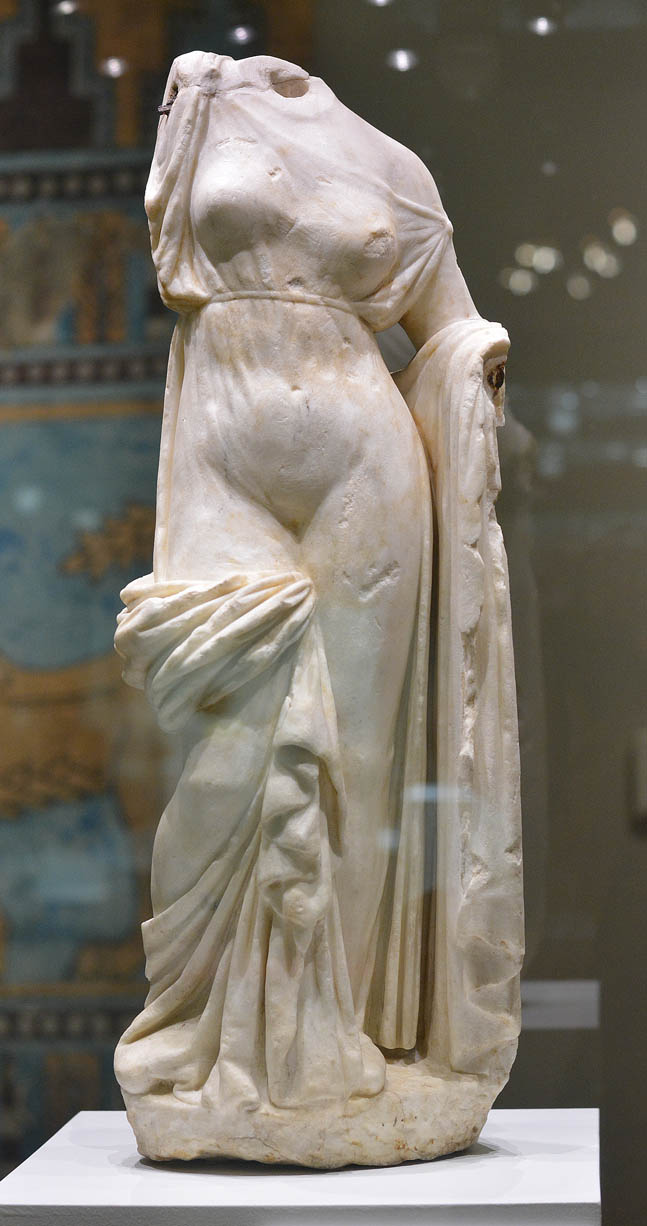
- Small statue of Aphrodite-Astłik 2nd-1st century BC, found from Artaxata, today in History Museum of Armenia
- Other names: Astghik, Astgik, Astxik
- Major cult center: Ashtishat
- Planet: Venus
- Animals: Columba
- Day: 7th day of each month in the Armenian calendar
- Gender: female
- Ethnic group: Armenian
- Festivals: Vardavar
- Consort: Vahagn

Equivalents
- Greek: Aphrodite
- Roman: Venus

Astłik or Astghik (Armenian: Աստղիկ) a prominent goddess in ancient Armenian mythology, is revered as the embodiment of beauty, love, fertility, and water. Celebrated for her celestial beauty, she was a key figure in Armenian religious practices. Astghik is also known as the bride of the warrior god Vahagn, who represents fire and thunder. She was worshiped during the early centuries of Armenia's history, with her influence tracing back to pre-Christian times. She was often identified with Aphrodite and the planet Venus

The celebration honoring Astghik is called Vardavar, during which people drench each other with water as a ritual of 'purification.' It symbolizes the renewal of life and the blessings of water, reflecting the goddess's influence in Armenian culture, as a holiday of the Transfiguration of Jesus.

One tradition says she was Noah's daughter, born after his flood.

== Etymology ==
The name "Astghik" (Աստղիկ) is derived from the Old Armenian word "astgh" (Աստղ), meaning "star." The suffix "-ik" is a diminutive, often used to convey the sense of "little" or "small." Thus, "Astghik" can be interpreted as "little star," emphasizing her association with celestial beauty and light.

== Mythology ==
Originally, Astghik was the goddess of creation of heaven and earth, however, later she was transformed into a deity of love, beauty, and fertility. This was shaped by cultural and religious changes in ancient Armenia. Originally seen as a powerful creator goddess linked to nature, Astghik's role shifted as the Armenian pantheon evolved. With the rise of Aramazd as the chief creator god and Anahit as the moon goddess, Astghik's position diminished.

The Hellenistic period, which began following the conquests of Alexander the Great, had a profound impact on the religious systems of many regions, including Armenia. Astghik's transformation into a figure more similar to Aphrodite (the Greek goddess of love, beauty, and fertility) is a direct result of this influence. In these traditions, love, beauty, fertility, and sexual power were highly emphasized, and it appears that Astghik's image evolved to reflect these qualities, as she began to embody characteristics similar to these well-known goddesses from the surrounding cultures.

== The myth of Astghik ==
Astghik had a habit of bathing in a stream, often in the nude. Her beauty was so captivating that young men from nearby villages would gather to watch her. In an attempt to see her more clearly, they would light fires near the stream.

However, Astghik was aware of their intentions and decided to protect her privacy. To prevent the young men from getting a better view, she created a thick fog that covered the area. This fog became a permanent feature of the place, and the location came to be known as "Msho Dasht". The name is derived from the Armenian word "mshoush," meaning fog, which is associated with Astghik’s mystical creation of the mist, emphasizing the importance of purity.

== Cultic locales ==
Astghik’s principal seat in Ashtishat.

Other temples and places of worship of Astłik had been located in various towns and villages, such as the mountain of Palaty (to the South-West from Lake Van), in Artamet (12 km from Van),.

== See also ==
- Armenian mythology
- Armenian Native Faith
- Anahit
- Aramazd
- Hayk
- Ishtar
- Vahagn

== Bibliography ==
- Acharian, Hrachia (1971) [Originally published 1926]. Hayeren armatakan baṛaran Հայերեն արմատական բառարան [Armenian Etymological Dictionary]. Vol. 1 (2nd ed.). Yerevan University Press.
- Petrosyan, Armen (2002). The Indo‑european and Ancient Near Eastern Sources of the Armenian Epic. Washington, D.C.: Institute for the Study of Man. ISBN 9780941694810.
- Petrosyan, Armen (2007). "State Pantheon of Greater Armenia: Earliest Sources". Aramazd: Armenian Journal of Near Eastern Studies. 2: 174–201. ISSN 1829-1376.
- Petrosyan, Armen (2015). Problems of Armenian Prehistory. Myth, Language, History. Yerevan: Gitutyun. ISBN 9785808012011.
