= Hagop Ishkanian =

American sculptor

- Հակոբ Իշխանյան
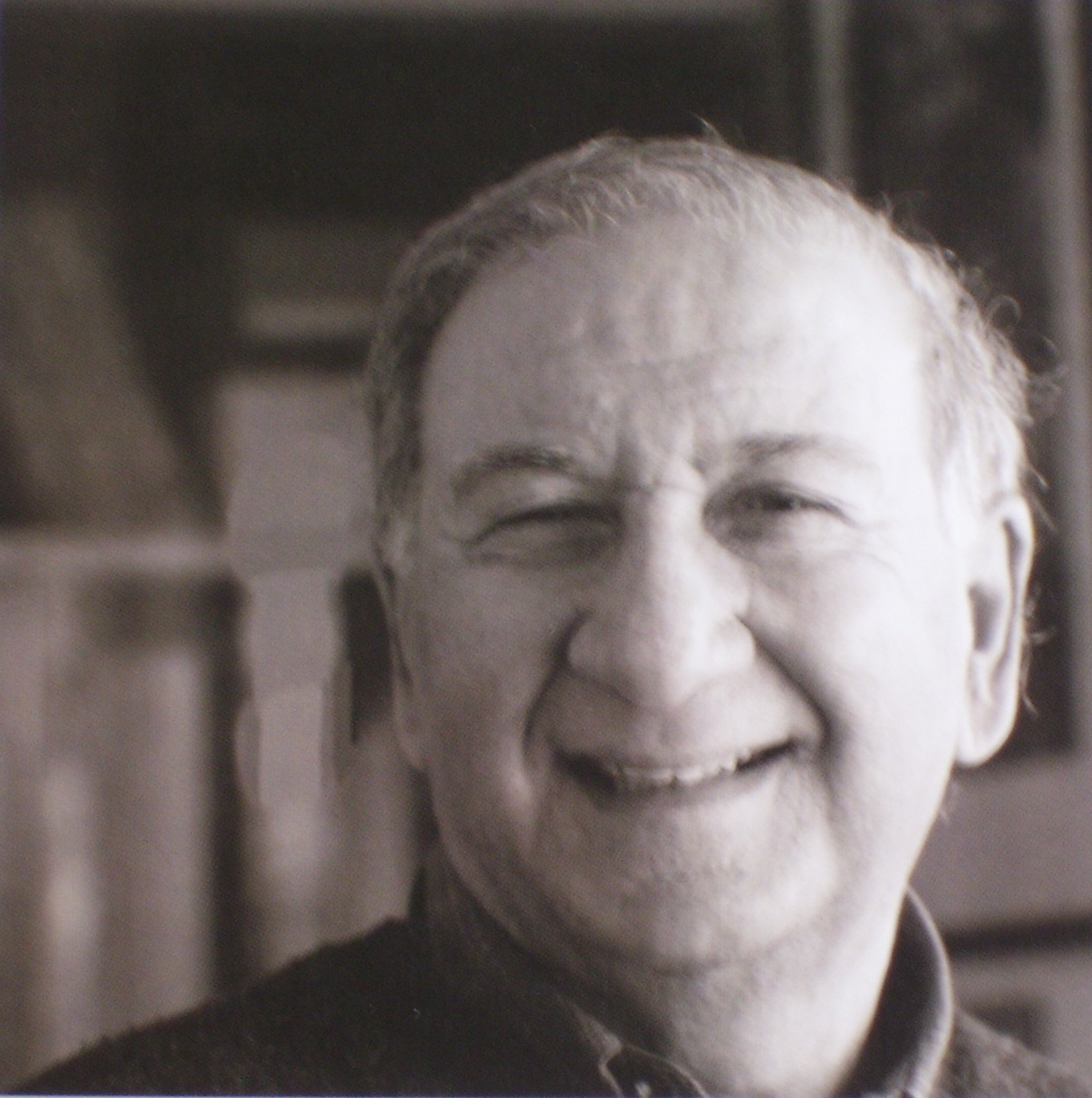
- Born: 27 July 1938 (age 88); Cairo, Egypt
- Known for: sculptor

Hagop Ishkanian (Armenian: Հակոբ Իշխանյան, born 27 July 1938) is a contemporary Armenian and American sculptor.

== Biography ==
Hagop Ishkanian was born on 27 July 1938 in Cairo, Egypt. In 1948 he emigrated with his family to Soviet Armenia. In 1964 he graduated from the Yerevan State Institute of Creative Art and Theatre (now known as the Yerevan State Academy of Art). That same year he participated in exhibitions organised by the state and the Armenian Union of Artists. In 1968 he joined the Armenian Union of Painters. Until 1977 he was a senior lecturer at the Yerevan Pedagogical Institute. In 1977 he emigrated to the United States where he continues to live and work.

Hagop Ishkanian's works are housed in the National Gallery of Armenia and private collections around the world.

In the United States, Ishkanian worked as an exterior and interior designer creating bespoke art and fixtures for a range of clients. He also briefly taught jewellery making at Torrance Joslyn Art Center (from 1990 to 1994).

In addition to his sculpting, Ishkanian is also an avid philatelist. Since the 1960s he has combined his interest in collecting rare stamps and first-day covers with his art. He has created hundreds of uniquely designed covers which have been exhibited in solo and group exhibitions in the US, including the annual stamp shows of the Armenian Philatelic Association.

Since 2000, Ishkanian has also produced unique silver and gold commemorative coins (Paul Z. Bedoukian, Yeghia T. Nercessian, Christopher Zakyan).

== Solo exhibitions ==
- 1988 – Art Center College, Pasadena, US
- 1994 – Biscotti Books, Pasadena, US

== Group exhibitions ==
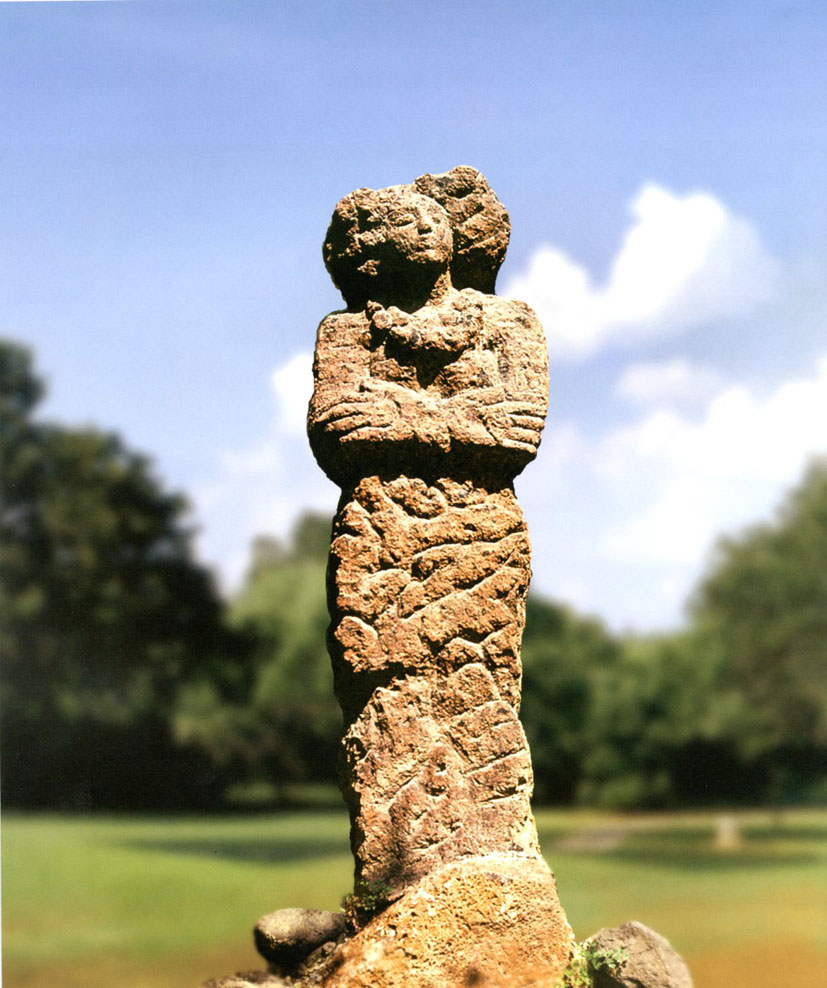
Anahit

- 1967 – (Bulgaria)
- 1969 – (Poland)
- 1971 – (Czechoslovakia)
- 1979 – Skyline Center, (Topanga, US)
- 1985 – Armenian Center, (Detroit, US)
- 1987 – Richard/Bennett Gallery, (Los Angeles, US)
- 1987 – Avian Gallery, (New York City)
- 1988 – Downtown Show, (Los Angeles, US)
- 1989 – Joslyn Art Center, (Torrance, US)
- 1993 – Joslyn Art Center, (Torrance, US)
- 1997 – "California Dreamin", Art Festival, Long Beach, US
- 1998 – Downey Museum of Art, (Downey, US)
- 2011 – The Power of Art, by Royal Gallery, Burbank, US
- 2014 – History and Landscape, Ararat-Eskijian Museum, Mission Hills, US

== Gallery ==
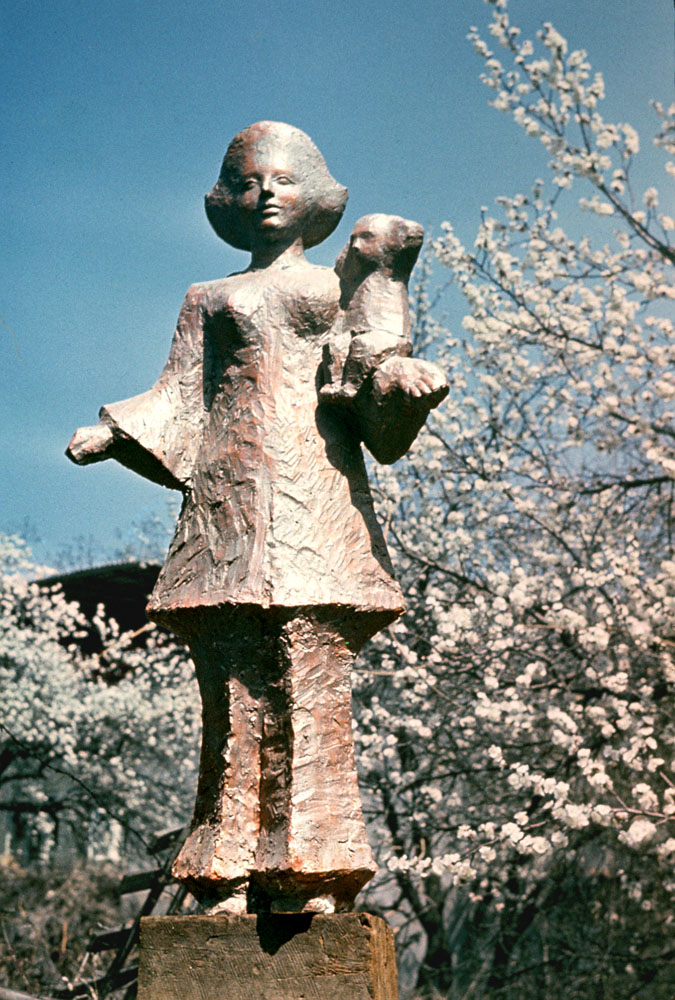
Peace for Child

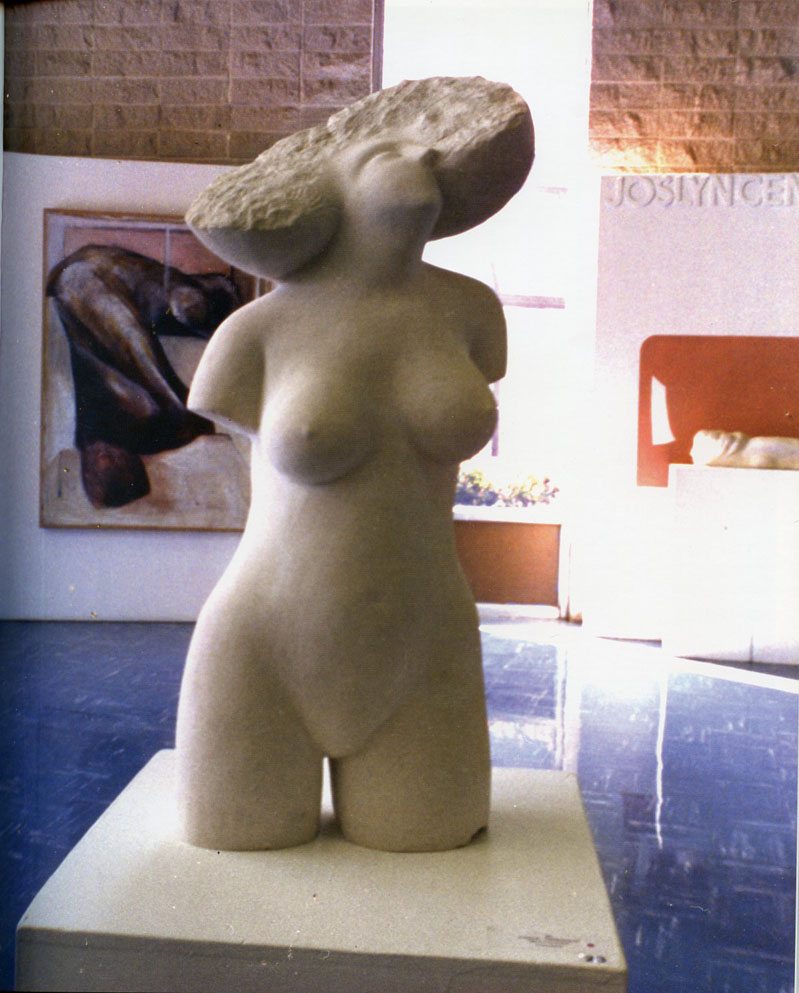
Ecstasy

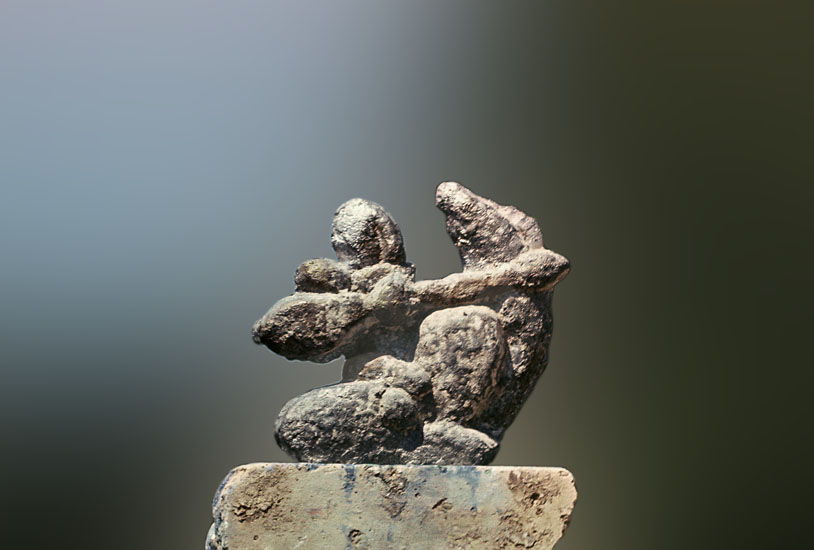
Archer

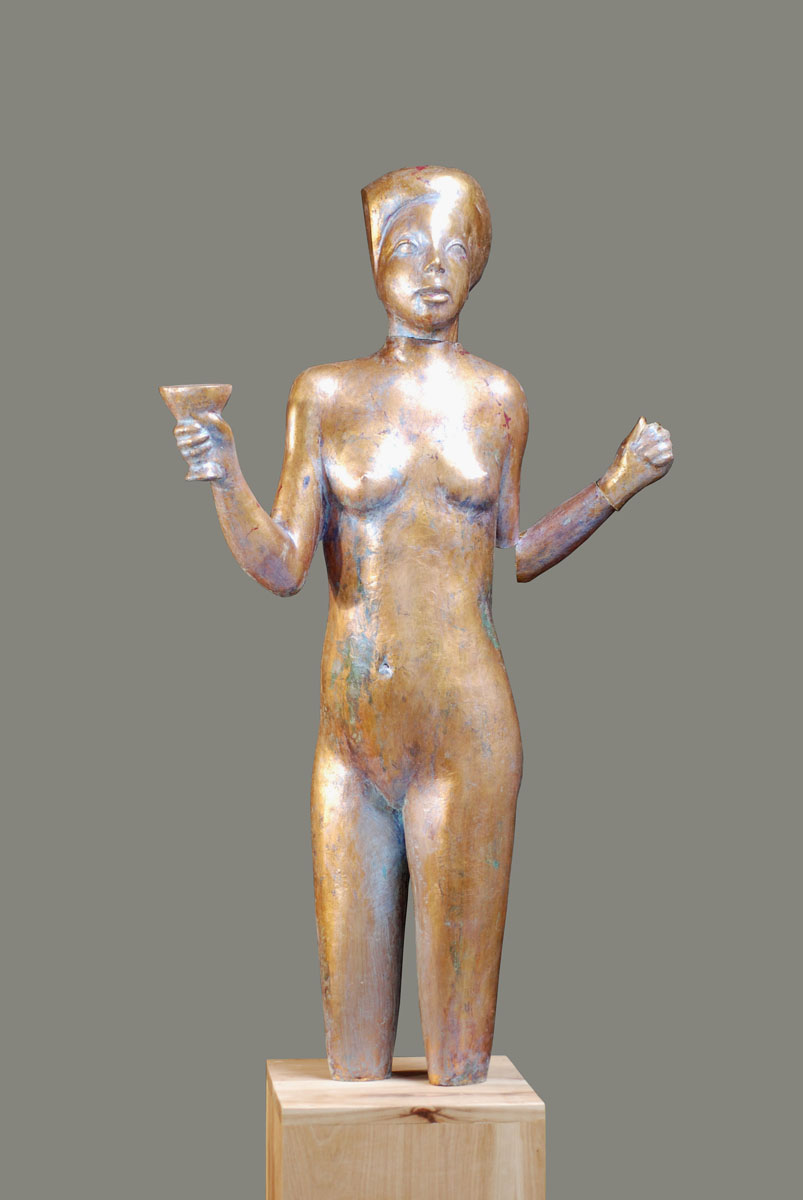
Cheer

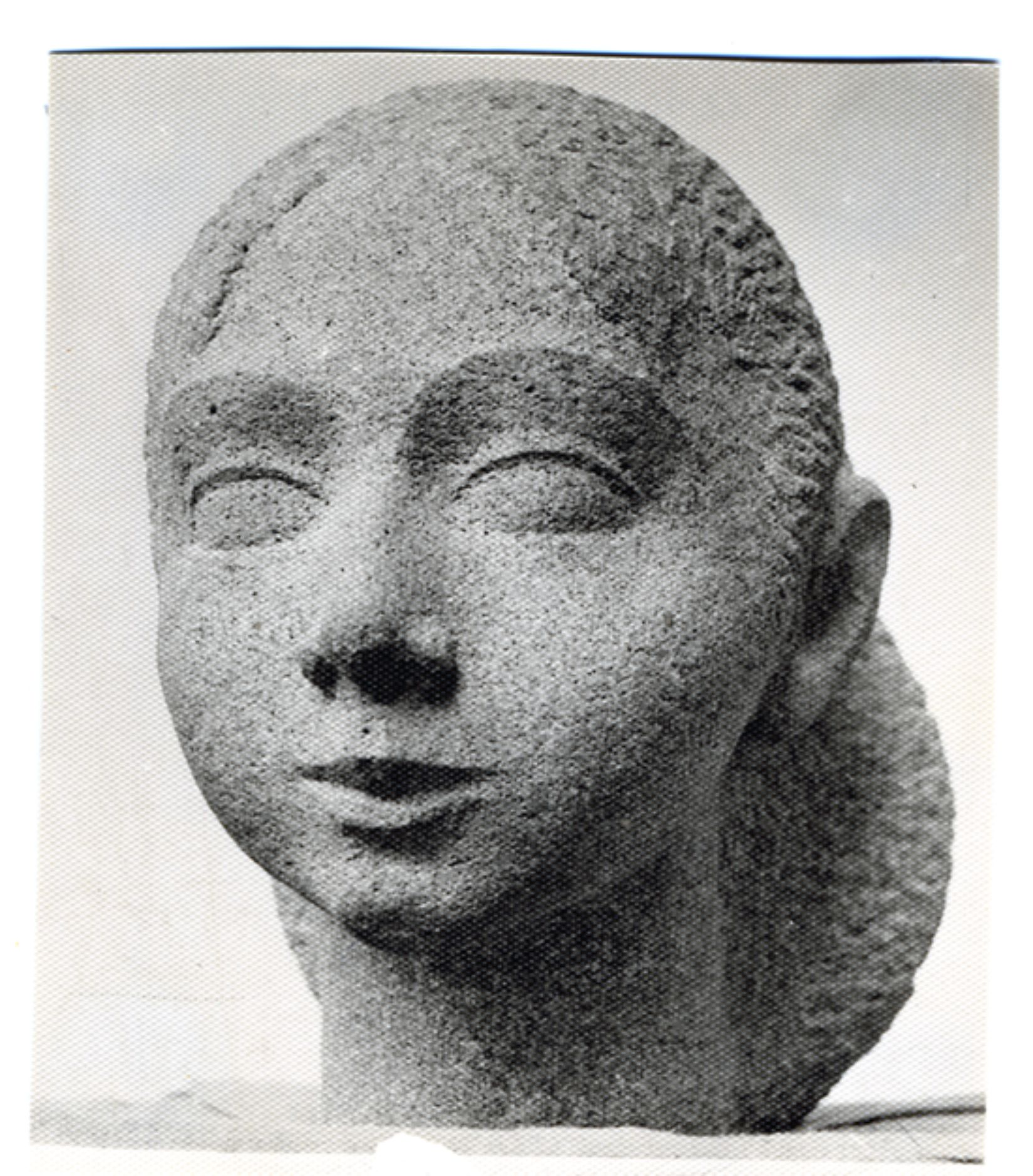
Tsoghik

== Notable works ==
- Music (bronze 1962)
- Mkrtich (granite 1963)
- Archer (lead 1963)
- Anahit (tuff 1964)
- Eve (tuff 1964)
- Erebuni (tuff 1964)
- Tsoghik (granite)
- Red Lady (plaster 1966)
- Birth (mixed media 1967)
- Nuneh (bronze 1967)
- Young archaeologist bronze
- The Victor (bronze 1969)
- Motherhood (mixed media 1970)
- Youth (pink marble 1972)
- Peace novice (bronze)
- The doll (plaster 1975)
- Doves (series ceramics 1976)
- Eagle (mixed media 1978)
- My Parents (mixed media 1984)
- Love (mixed media 1984)
- Dream (mixed media 1984)
- Genocide Memorial (1985)
- The Kiss (limestone 1986)
- Earthquake (limestone 1988)
- Spring (limestone 1988)
- Tina (plastic cast 2002)
- Tattoo (plastic cast 2002)
- Barbara (plastic cast 2003)
- Cello (plastic cast 2007)
- Guitar (plastic cast 2007)
- Our Lady (plastic cast 2007)

== Bibliography ==
- "Contemporary Soviet Sculpture" Soviet Artist, Moscow, 1973 pages 262- 263 (in Russian)
- Armenian art agenda, AAA Publishing House 1994, ISBN 0-9697620-0-4
- Hagop Ishkanian 1962–2008, 2008 ISBN 978-1-60725-611-3
