= Vahan (given name) =

Vahan (Armenian: Վահան) is a given name. A common name variation of this name is Vaan (Russian: Ваан). People with the given name Vahan include:

== Given name ==
- Vahan (Byzantine commander) (died 636), Eastern Roman Byzantine commander of Armenian origin
- Vahan Artsruni (born 1965), Armenian rock musician
- Vahan Bichakhchyan (born 1999), Armenian footballer
- Vahan Cardashian (1882–1934), Armenian-American political activist and lawyer
- Vahan Chamlian (1926–2022), American-Armenian businessman and philanthropist
- Vahan Gevorgyan (born 1981), Polish Armenian footballer
- Vahan Hovhannisyan (born 1956), Armenian politician
- Vahan Juharyan (born 1978), Armenian wrestler
- Vahan Kurkjian (1863–1961), Syrian-born Armenian author and historian wrote authored History of Armenia
- Vahan Malezian (1871–1966), Armenian writer, poet, translator and social activist
- Vahan Mamikonian (440/445–503/510), Armenian nobleman
- Vahan Mardirossian (born 1975), Armenian conductor and pianist
- Vahan Minakhoryan (1884–1946), Armenian politician
- Vahan Mkhitaryan (born 1996), Armenian swimmer
- Vahan Papazian (1876–1973), Armenian doctor, politician and political activist
- Vahan Shirvanian (1925–2013), American Armenian cartoonist
- Vahan Tekeyan (1863–1961), pan-Armenian poet and activist
- Vahan Terian (1875–1920), Armenian poet
- Vahan Terpanchian (1912–1998), Armenian Iranian cinematographer and producer
- Vahan Totovents (1889–1938), Armenian writer, poet and activist

== Middle name ==
- Raymond Vahan Damadian (1936–2022), Armenian-American physician, medical researcher and inventor of the MRI machine

== See also ==
- Vahan (disambiguation)
- Gabriel Vahanian (1927–2012), French Protestant Christian theologian
