= Palangan, Kurdistan =

Palangan پالنگان
- Village
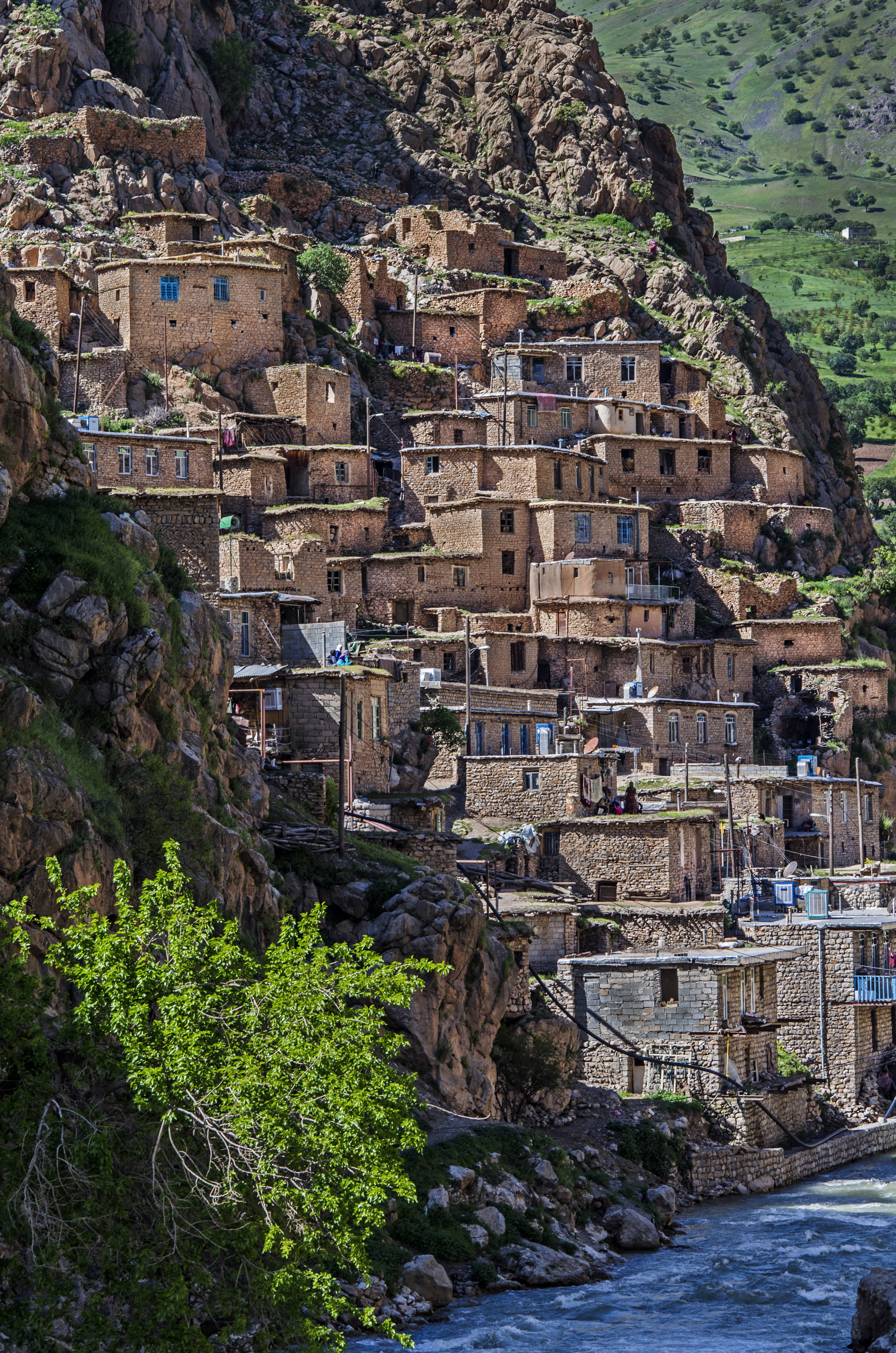

- Location within Iran
- Coordinates: 35°04′06″N 46°36′12″E
- Country: Iran
- Province: Kurdistan
- County: Kamyaran
- Bakhsh: Central
- Rural District: Zhavehrud

Population (2006)
  - Total: 821
- Time zone: UTC+3:30 (IRST)
  - Summer (DST): UTC+4:30 (IRDT)

Palangan (Persian: پالنگان, Palangān; Kurdish: پاڵنگان), also known as Patagān, Patakān, and Tangān, is a Kurdish village in Kurdistan Province, Iran. The village is situated on the banks of the mouth of Tangivar River into Sirwan River.

Its population was 821, with 194 families, in the 2006 Iranian census. There is a site near the village that contains the ruins of an ancient fort. Residents speak the endangered Hawrami dialect of the Gorani language. The village dates back to pre-Islamic times and was an administrative center in the Principality of Ardalan.

== History ==
It is not known from when precisely Palangan was inhabited, however it has been inhabited since at least the pre-Islamic period. The town has been rebuilt several times, most recently half a millennium ago. Ruins of the previous village lie approximately 2km away from its modern location.

It was home to a Kurdish principality, although a part of Ardalan. Typically, it was governed by a member of the Ardalan family, however, in 1576, a qizilbash emir, Sulaq Hoseyn Tekkelu, was appointed as its governor. The town of Palangan was naturally the centre of the district, and contained within it a very strong fortress, destroyed by Safi I.

=== Palangan Fortress ===
The fortress has also been strategically used throughout history. In the 7th century, it was put under siege by invading Arab forces for three months, its inhabitants given amnesty after it surrendered. In 1215, the Ardalan kicked out the Kalhor from the fortress, and occupied the fortress for themselves.
