= Ankadzor =

- Location within Armenia
- Coordinates: 40°53′N 44°39′E
- Country: Armenia
- Marz (Province): Lori
- Time zone: UTC+4 ( )
  - Summer (DST): UTC+5 ( )

Ankadzor (also, Shagali-Eylar) is a town in the Lori Province of Armenia.

== See also ==
- Lori Province
