= Vahagn (name) =

- Pronunciation: [vɑˈhɑɡən]
- Gender: Male

Origin
- Origin: Armenian, Avestan
- Meaning: "smiting of resistance"

Vahagn (or Vahakn) (Armenian: Վահագն) is a common Armenian male given name, referring to ancient Armenian god of war and courage Vahagn – the Armenian counterpart of the Zoroastrian god of victory Verethragna, whose name in Avestan means "smiting of resistance". See Վահագն for more on the origin of the name.

== People with the name ==
=== Vahagn ===
- Vahagn Davtyan (1922–1996), Armenian poet, translator, publicist and activist
- Vahagn Davtyan (gymnast) (born 1988), Armenian artistic gymnast
- Vahagn Hayrapetyan (born 1968), Armenian jazz musician
- Vahagn Khachatryan (born 1959), Armenian politician
- Vahagn Militosyan (born 1993), Armenian footballer
- Vahagn Minasyan (born 1985), Armenian footballer
- Vahagn (King of Armenia)

=== Vahakn ===
- Vahakn Dadrian (born 1926), Armenian-American sociologist and historian
- Vahakn Medzadourian (born 1978), Armenian-American entrepreneur and investor
