= Vahagni =

Vahagni Վահագնի
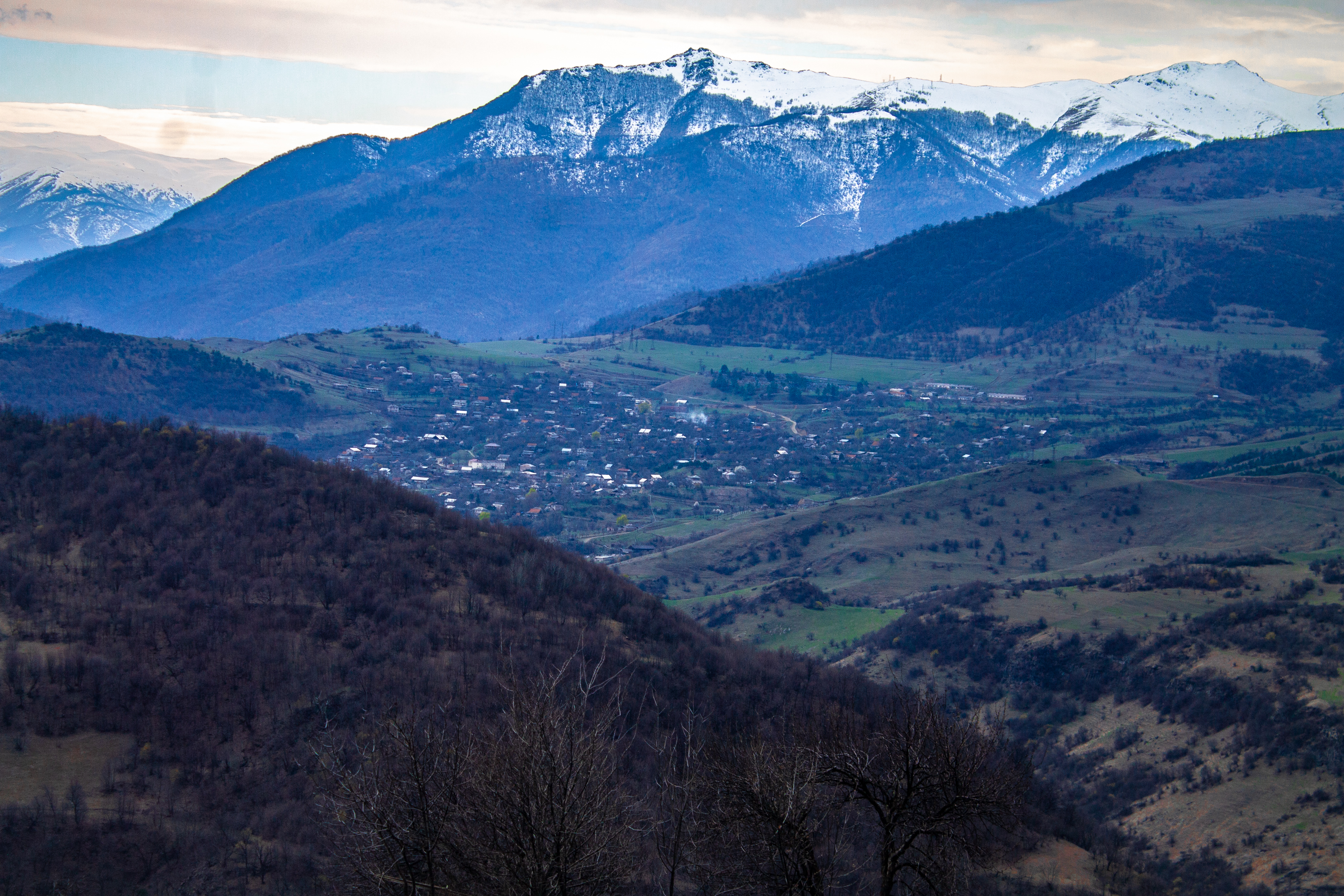

- Location within Armenia
- Coordinates: 40°54′29″N 44°36′25″E
- Country: Armenia
- Marz (Province): Lori Province

Population (2011)
  - Total: 1,070
- Time zone: UTC+4 (AMT)

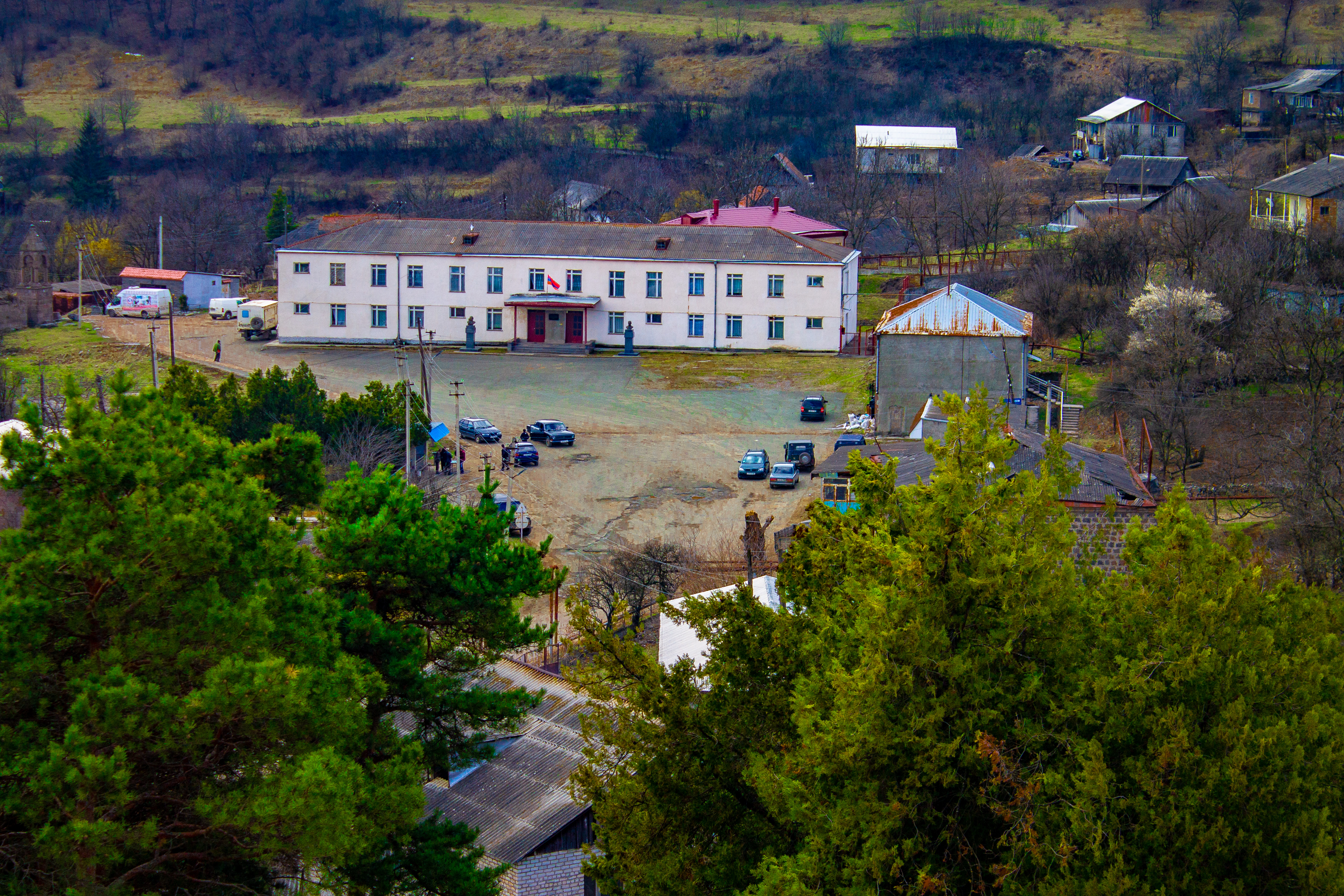
Central square in Vahagni

Vahagni (Armenian: Վահագնի, also romanized as Vaagni), formerly Shahali (Armenian: Շահալի, also romanized from Russian as Shagali), is a village in the Lori Province of Armenia.

== Development programs ==
In 2015, development programs started to be implemented in Vahagni by Children of Armenia Fund (COAF). Women Health Screenings and Support for Reproductive Health were implemented in the village by COAF.

== Notable people ==
- Anton Kochinyan (1913–1990), Soviet Armenian politician

== See also ==
- Lori Province
- Children of Armenia Fund
