= Garni Temple =

Greco-Roman colonnaded building in Armenia

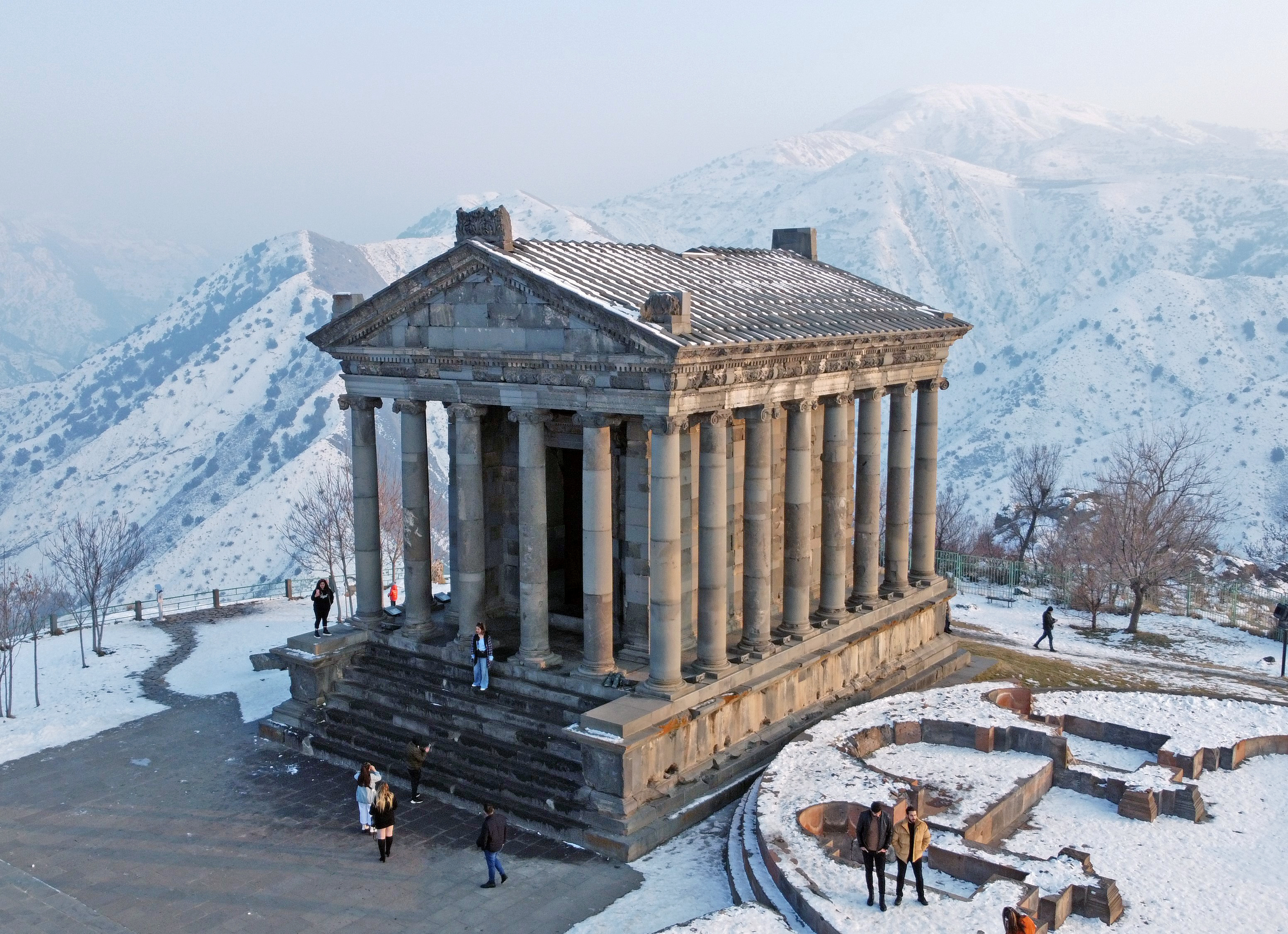
- The temple in 2021

- Location within Armenia

General information
- Status: Museum (part of a larger protected area), occasional neopagan (Hetanist) shrine
- Type: Pagan temple or tomb
- Architectural style: Ancient Greek/Roman
- Location: Garni, Kotayk Province, Armenia
- Coordinates: 40.112421°N 44.730277°E
- Completed: 1st or 2nd century AD
- Destroyed: 1679 earthquake
- Operator: Armenian Ministry of Culture

Height
- Height: 10.7 metres (35 ft) (Note: base: 2.8 metres (9.2 ft); cella: 7.9 metres (26 ft))

Technical details
- Material: Basalt
- Floor area: 15.7 by 11.5 m (52 by 38 ft)

Design and construction
- Architects: Alexander Sahinian (reconstruction, 1969–75)

The Garni Temple (Note: Armenian: Գառնիի տաճար, Gaṙnii tač̣ar; often called Գառնիի or Գառնու հեթանոսական տաճար, Gaṙnii or Gaṙnu het'anosakan tač̣ar, lit. 'pagan temple of Garni', sometimes translated as "heathen" instead of "pagan".) is a classical colonnaded structure in the village of Garni, in central Armenia, around 30 km (19 mi) east of Yerevan. Built in the Ionic order, it is the best-known structure and symbol of pre-Christian Armenia. Considered an eastern outpost of the Greco-Roman world, it is the only largely preserved Hellenistic building in the former Soviet Union. (Note: after the reconstruction: Adam T. Smith: "the only Greco-Roman colonnaded building anywhere in the Soviet Union"; Dickran Kouymjian: "...has the distinction of being the only Greco-Roman temple standing above ground in the entire Soviet Union."; Arkhitektura SSSR: "the only fully restored monument of ancient architecture in our country—Garni."; A U.S. historic preservation team, 1974: "The structure [...] is claimed to be the USSR's best preserved memorial of antiquity."; before the reconstruction: Hakob Manandian: "Certainly, this is the only architectural monument of the Hellenistic era throughout the entire Soviet Union."; Kamilla Trever: "...its temple, the like of which we do not yet know on the territory of our Union."; Aleksandr Mongait: "the best-preserved ancient temple in the territory of the Soviet Union".)

It is conventionally identified as a pagan temple to the sun god Mihr (Mithra) built by King Tiridates I in the first century AD. A competing hypothesis sees it as a second century tomb. It collapsed in a 1679 earthquake, but much of its fragments remained on the site. Renewed interest in the 19th century led to excavations in the early and mid-20th century. It was reconstructed in 1969–75, using the anastylosis technique. It is one of the main tourist attractions in Armenia and the central shrine of Armenian neopaganism.

== Setting ==
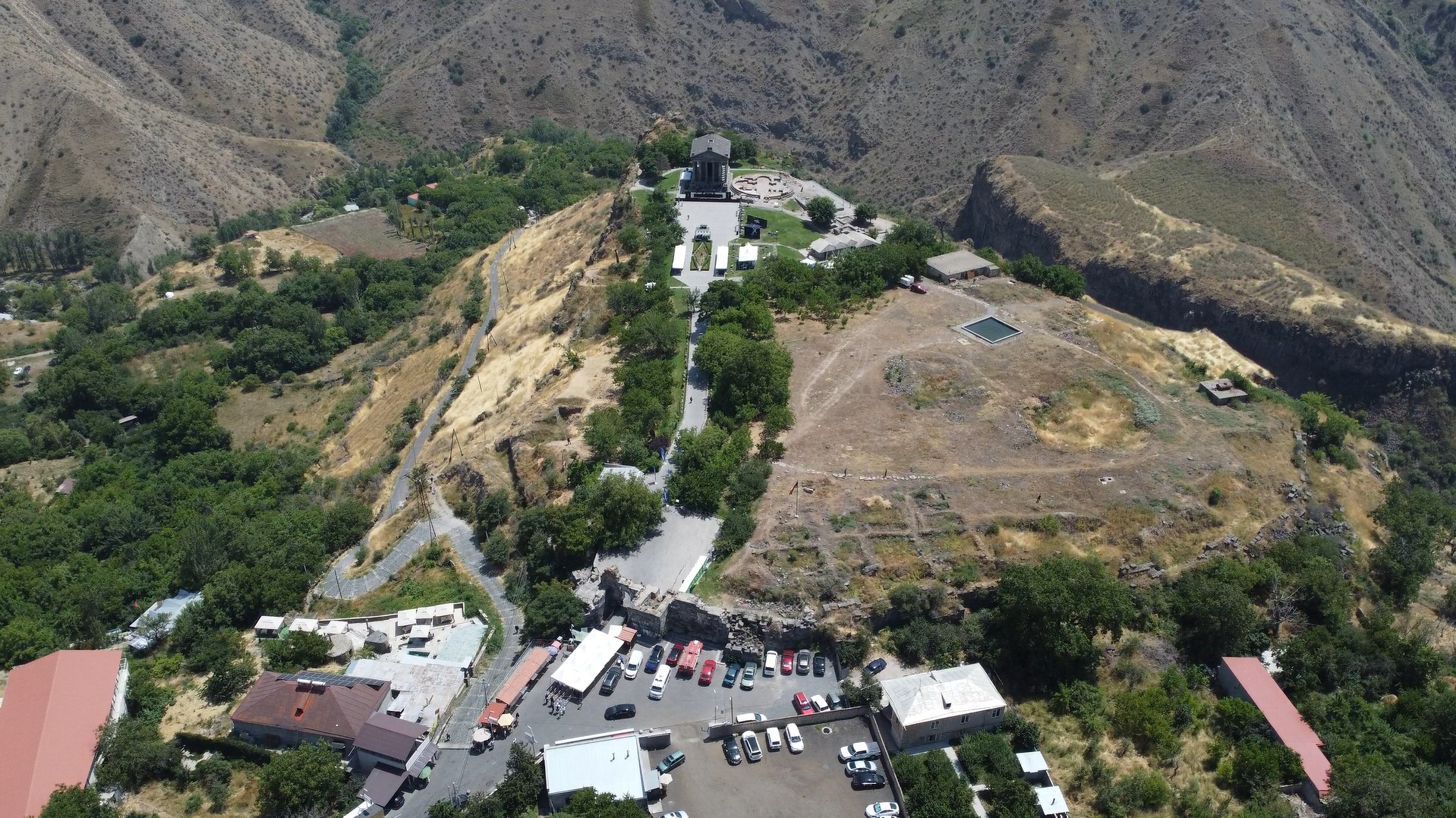
An aerial view of the site

The site is in the village of Garni, in Armenia's Kotayk Province, around 30 km (19 mi) east of capital Yerevan, at 1,400 m (4,600 ft) above sea level. The temple is at the edge of a triangular promontory rising above the ravine of the Azat River and the Gegham mountains. It is a part of the fortress of Garni, (Note: Armenian: Գառնիի or Գառնու ամրոց, Gařnii or Gařnu amrots) one of Armenia's oldest, that was strategically significant for the defense of the major cities in the Ararat plain. Besides the temple, the site contains a Bronze Age cyclopean masonry wall, a cuneiform inscription by king Argishti I of Urartu (who called it Giarniani), a Roman bath with a partly preserved mosaic floor with a Greek inscription, ruins of palace, other "paraphernalia of the Greco-Roman world", the medieval round church of St. Sion (Zion), and other objects (e.g., medieval khachkars). In the first century, Tacitus mentioned castellum Gorneas as a major fortress in his Annals. Tim Cornell and John Matthews classify Garni, with its classical building, as "the most easterly point reached by the Romans".

== Date and function ==
The dating and function of the structure remain subjects of ongoing scholarly debate. (Note: "...now reconstructed as a temple, though this identification has been challenged.") Christina Maranci describes it as an Ionic structure with "unclear function", suggesting it may have been a funerary monument or royal tomb rather than a temple.

Remains of an older sanctuary were discovered under its foundations, which has been interpreted as an Urartian temple.

=== Temple ===
The prevailing view, especially among Armenian scholars, attributes its construction to king Tiridates I around 77 AD. (Note: It is nearly universally accepted in mainstream Armenian historiography. Brady Kiesling stated that this view has been accepted by some scholars, while according to Zhores Khachatryan, who accepted the dating, wrote that most scholars agree with it. Aleksandr Mongait wrote in 1955: "The majority of scholars tend to consider the Garni temple as a construction of King Trdat I, dating back to the 1st century AD." Khatchadourian wrote that it is "most commonly regarded as a temple to the god Mihr or Mithras, built in the late first century C.E.") This date derives from a Greek inscription, discovered in 1945, naming Helios Tiridates as the founder, stating it was built in the eleventh year of his reign. (Note: The inscription is "on a block of basalt 165 cm long, 50 cm high, and 79–80 cm thick; the letters are about 5 x 5.5 cm in size." It was discovered by Martiros Saryan in July 1945 at the Garni cemetery, recently brought from a nearby water mill. It is now located within the fortress.) While Movses Khorenatsi attributed it to Tiridates III, most scholars now favor Tiridates I. This dating connects to Tiridates's 66 AD visit to Rome, where Emperor Nero crowned him following the peace treaty ending the Parthian-Roman war over Armenia. Nero provided 50 million drachmas and Roman craftsmen to help rebuild the capital Artaxata destroyed by Roman general Corbulo. Its construction may have occurred during this reconstruction period.

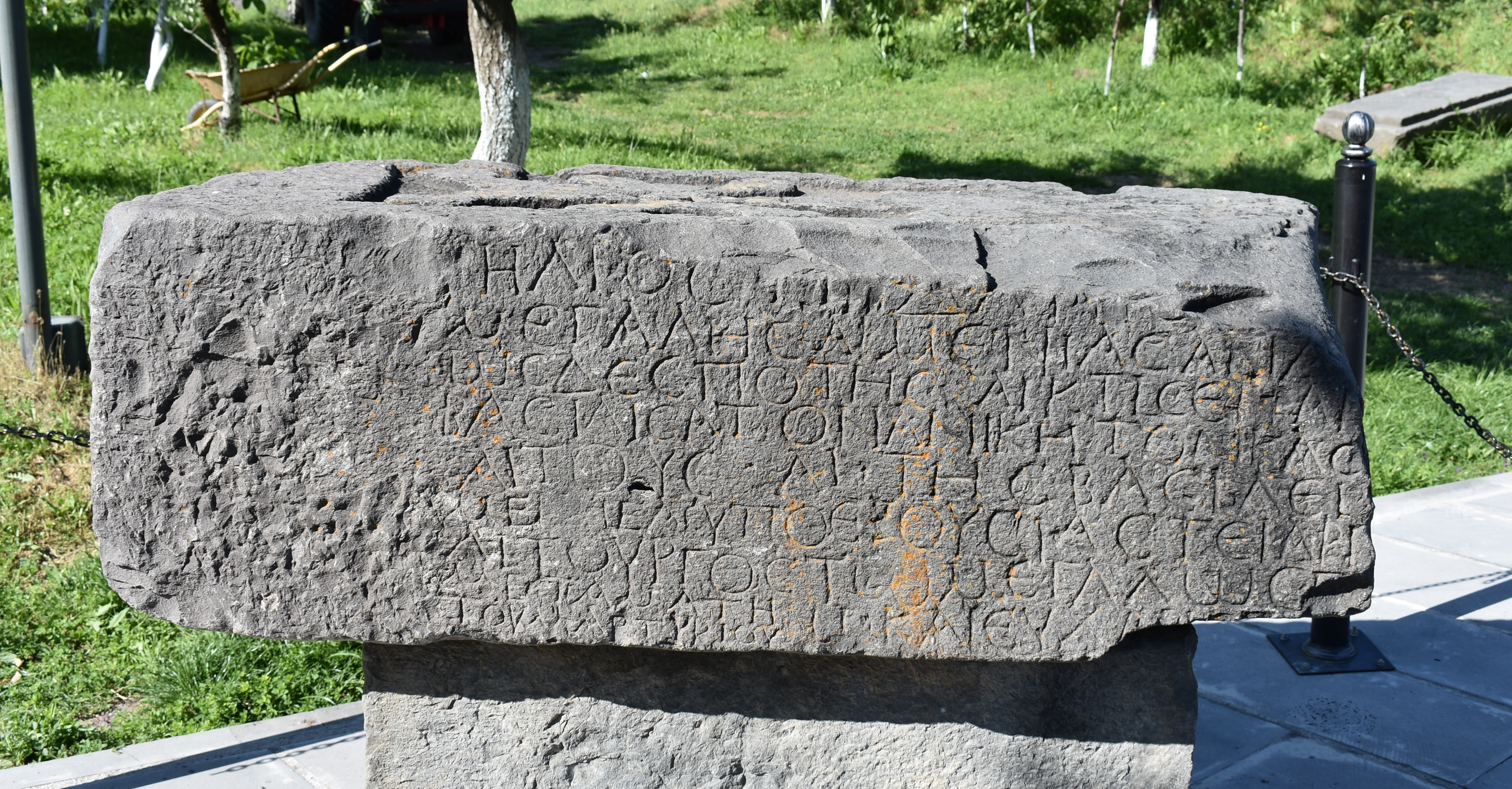
The Greek inscription of Tiridates I (see rubbing) reading and translation of the inscription: Greek text / Translation; Ἥλιος Τιριδάτης [ὁ μέγας] μεγάλης Ἀρμενίας ἄνα[κτος] ὡς δεσπότης. Αἴκτισε ναΐ[διον] βασιλίσ[σ]α τὸν ἀνίκητον κασ[ιν ἐνι]-\ αιτούς. Αι. Τῆς βασιλεί[ας αὐτου] με[γαλείας]. Ὑπὸ ἐξουσίᾳ στεγάν[ου] λίτουργος τῷ μεγάλῳ σπ[ῆι εὔχεσθε] μετὰ ματήμι καὶ εὐχαρ[ιστίαν εὐχὴν] τοῦ μαρτυρίου. / The Sun Tiridatēs of Greater Armenia, lord as despot, built a temple for the queen; the invincible... in the eleventh year of his reign....Under the protection of the... may the priest to the great cave (?) in the vain (?) of the witness and thanks.

In Armenia, the temple is commonly believed to have been dedicated to Mihr, the sun god in the Zoroastrian-influenced Armenian mythology and the equivalent of Mithra. (Note: "most commonly regarded as a temple to the god Mihr or Mithras") Tiridates, like other Armenian monarchs, considered Mihr his patron. Some scholars argue that, given the historical context in which the temple was constructed—after his coronation in Rome—it would be logical to assume that Tiridates dedicated the temple to his patron god.

Scholars differ on who built the structure: Telfer attributed it to Greek workmen, Fetvadjian to Roman architects, and Maranci proposed involvement of imperial Roman workmen. In contrast, Nersessian and Harutyunyan argued that local craftsmen, skilled in basalt carving, were responsible.

=== Mausoleum or tomb ===
Not all scholars agree that the structure was a temple. Among early sceptics, Kamilla Trever suggested in 1947 that it was built between 115-117 AD when Armenia was briefly declared a Roman province under Trajan, as such occasions typically involved building temples housing emperor statues. However, she later concluded that if the temple were solely for imperial cult worship, it would likely have been destroyed after the end of Roman rule.

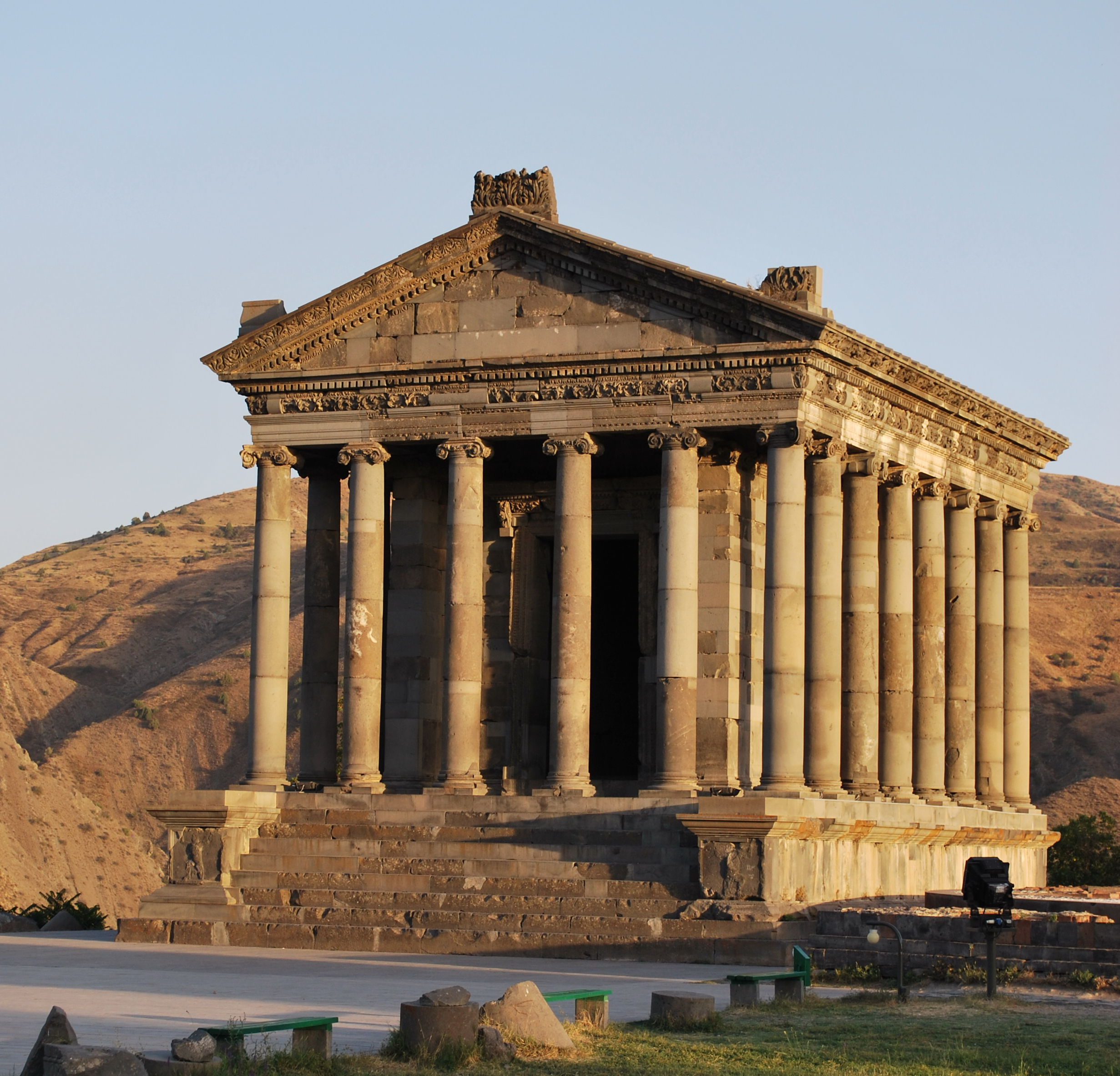
The temple at sunset

In 1982 Richard D. Wilkinson suggested that the building is a tomb, probably constructed c. 175 AD in honor of one of the Romanized kings of Armenia of the late 2nd century. This theory is based on a comparison to Graeco-Roman buildings of western Asia Minor (e.g. Nereid Monument, Belevi Mausoleum, Mausoleum at Halicarnassus), the discovery of nearby graves that date to about that time, and the discovery of a few marble pieces of the Asiatic sarcophagus style. Wilkinson furthermore states that there is no direct evidence linking the structure to Mithras or Mihr, and that the Greek inscription attributed to Tiridates I probably refers to the fortress and not to the colonnaded structure. He also notes that it is unlikely that a pagan temple would survive destruction during Armenia's 4th-century conversion to Christianity when all other such temples were destroyed.

Wilkinson's theory has found some support, especially outside Armenia. (Note: Endorsed by James R. Russell, A. E. Redgate, Robert H. Hewsen, Matthew Canepa, C. S. Lightfoot.) James R. Russell finds the view of the structure being a temple of Mihr baseless and is skeptical that the Greek inscription refers to the temple. He suggested that the "splendid mausoleum" was erected by Romans living in Armenia. Russell agreed with Wilkinson's interpretation that it was a 2nd-century tomb, "possibly of one of the Romanized kings of Armenia", such as Sohaemus, and that it is "unique for the country and testifies to a particularly strong Roman presence." Felix Ter-Martirosov also believed it was built in the latter half of the 2nd century. Robert H. Hewsen argued, based on the construction of a church in the 7th century next to it rather than in its place, that the building was "more likely the tomb of one of the Roman-appointed kings of Armenia", such as Tiridates I or Sohaemus (r. 140–160).

== Medieval history ==
In the early fourth century, (Note: The traditional date is 301 AD, but the "scholarly consensus is to prefer c. 314.") when King Tiridates III adopted Christianity as Armenia's state religion, all pagan places of worship in the country were destroyed by Gregory the Illuminator. Scholars regard it as the only pagan, Hellenistic, or Greco-Roman (classical) structure to have survived the widespread destruction. (Note: pagan: "The monuments of Garni are the only vestiges of the pagan architecture of Armenia known to us. [...] The most important ruins are those of the temple"; "...all pagan cultic structures (except the temple of Garni) were mercilessly destroyed..."; "Armenia's only remaining pagan temple, at Garni"; "...հեթանոս հայության ճարտարապետական ժառանգությունից պահպանված միակ հիշատակարանը" ["...the only surviving monument of the pagan Armenian architectural heritage"]; "The obliteration of pagan vestiges was so complete that almost no architectural remains or temple records have survived ... The only exception is the Temple of Garni") (Note: Hellenistic/Greco-Roman: "the only known surviving classical temple in Armenia."; "The pagan temple of Garni, dedicated to the god Mihr, is the only surviving Hellenistic building"; "the only remaining intact model of Hellenistic architecture in Armenia"; "The only surviving Hellenistic temple") (Note: Fragments of an ornamented Ionic cornice from a pre-Christian structure (possibly a temple) were unearthed underneath Saint Hripsime Church in Vagharshapat the late 1950s, while a monumental Greco-Roman temple complex was excavated in Artaxata (Artashat) in the 2000s. The latter has been identified as the only pagan temple in Armenia besides Garni.) Scholars continue to debate why it was exempted from destruction.

An early Armenian inscription suggesting the structure's use as a baptistery.

According to Movses Khorenatsi a "cooling-off house" (tun hovanots) was built within the fortress of Garni for Khosrovidukht, the sister of Tiridates III. Some scholars believe the temple was thus turned into a royal summer house. The structure presumably underwent some changes. Cult statue(s) in the cella were removed, the opening in the roof for skylight was closed, and the entrance was transformed and adjusted for residence. Ter-Martirosov argued that after Armenia's Christianization, it was initially a royal shrine, but after Khosrovidukht's death c. 325/326 it was transformed into a Christian mausoleum dedicated to her. Hamlet Petrosyan and Zhores Khachatryan rejected the postulated Christianization of the temple. Dickran Kouymjian also rejected its use as a Christian building.

Zhores Khachatryan argues that it underwent depaganization and was thereafter seen as a fine structure within the royal palace complex. A 2014 study by Armenuhi Magarditchian, based on a newly discovered early Armenian inscription inside the cella, suggested that the structure was transformed into a baptistery between the fifth and seventh centuries.

In the Middle Ages, variously dated between the 7th and 10th centuries, a round church of St. Sion (Zion) was built immediately west of it. Their relationship remains unclear, but Maranci suggested that "it seems likely that one did exist". Hewsen suggested that the church was built next to it rather than in its place because it was a tomb, not a pagan temple.

Arabic inscriptions near the entrance

1291 inscription of Khoshak Zakarian

The walls of the temple bear six Arabic inscriptions in the Kufic style and one in Persian in the naskh script, which have all been paleographically dated to the ninth to tenth centuries. They commemorate the capture of the fortress and may point to the temple's conversion into a mosque. On its entryway, there is a large Armenian inscription from 1291, left by Princess Khoshak of Garni and her son, Amir Zakare. Khoshak, the granddaughter of Ivane I Zakarian, recorded the exemption of the people of Garni from taxes paid in wine, goats, and sheep. (Note: The inscription was first published, with some errors, by Garegin Hovsepian 1910.)

Medieval Christian Armenian chroniclers referred to it as the "throne of Trdat" (Տրդատայ թախտ, Trdata t‘akht). (Note: 19th century European visitors Robert Ker Porter and DuBois de Montpereux attested that the site was called "Takh Terdat" or "Tackt-i-Tiridate". Zakaria Kanakertsi called it Trdakert (from Trdatakert meaning "built by Tiridates").) The 13th-century historian Kirakos Gandzaketsi called it the "marvellous throne of Trdat". In the last major written record about the temple before its collapse, poet Simeon of Aparan penned a lament in 1593. (Note: Entitled: «Ողբանք ի վերայ թախթին Տրդատայ թագաւորին». Translated into English by Agop Jack Hacikyan et al in 2002.) He grieved the past greatness of Armenia and mentioned the number of its columns and steps, and noted the use of iron clamps and lead. It was also visited by Grigor Daranaghtsi (Kamakhetsi) in the early 1600s.

== Collapse and reconstruction ==
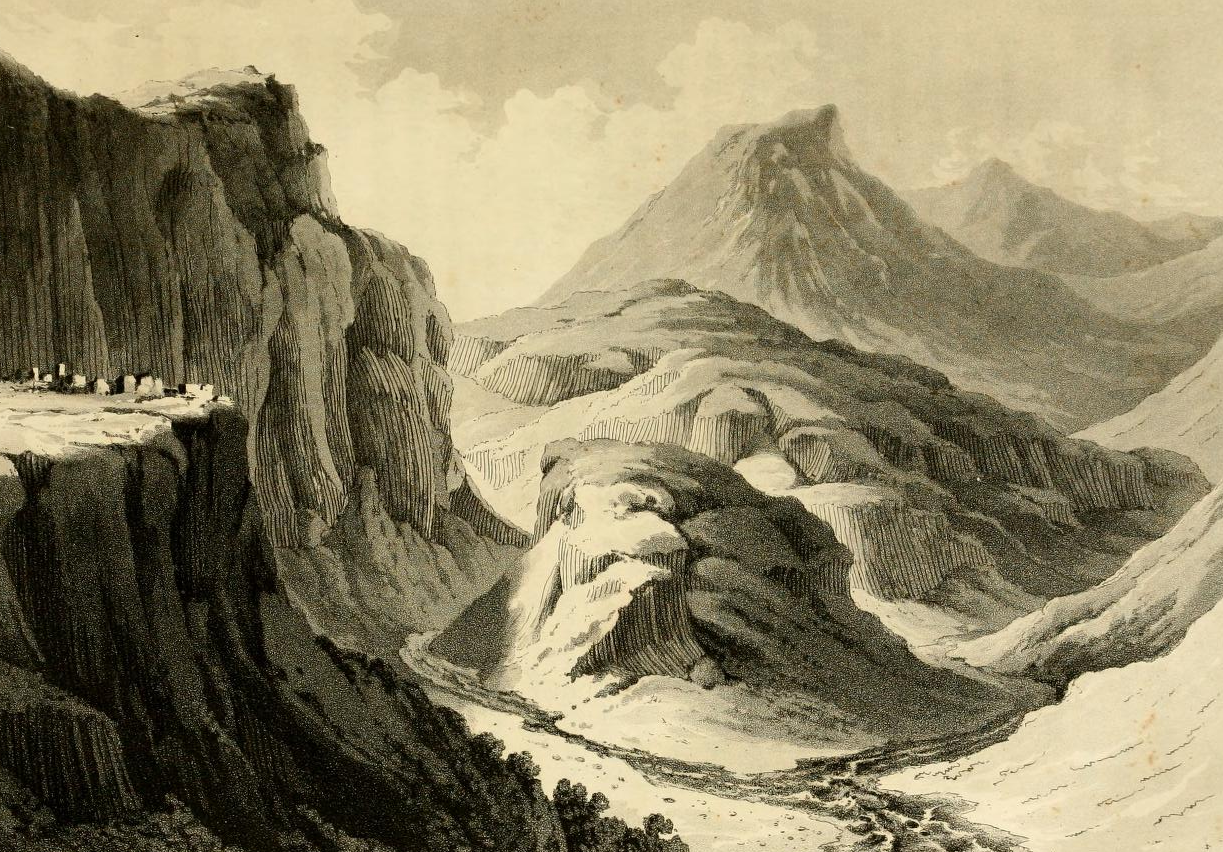
Robert Ker Porter's 1821 drawing of the Garni Gorge. The ruins are on the promontory on the left.

The entire colonnade collapsed during a devastating earthquake on June 4, 1679, with the epicenter in the Garni Gorge. The collapse is attested by the contemporary chronicler Zakaria Kanakertsi. It split diagonally and fell toward the northeast, with architectonic materials falling as far as 50 m (160 ft). The pedestal, the lower part of the cella, and the column bases remained standing, with the pedestal being undamaged. Its location on a promontory flanked on two sides by deep gorges, while visually striking, is seismically unfavorable because earthquake forces are intensified there.

It stood for over sixteen centuries, likely due to its unusually sturdy construction for its modest scale and its substantial podium, which provided a solid foundation. Other researchers have attributed its seismic longevity to its deep volcanic slag foundations. Geological surveys found that the pedestal rests on a layer of scoria that sits on top of solid breccia and basalt, providing the structure stability. It was however weakened decades earlier, during the wars of Shah Abbas of Iran, when iron clamps and lead fillings were removed to cast bullets.

=== Renewed interest ===
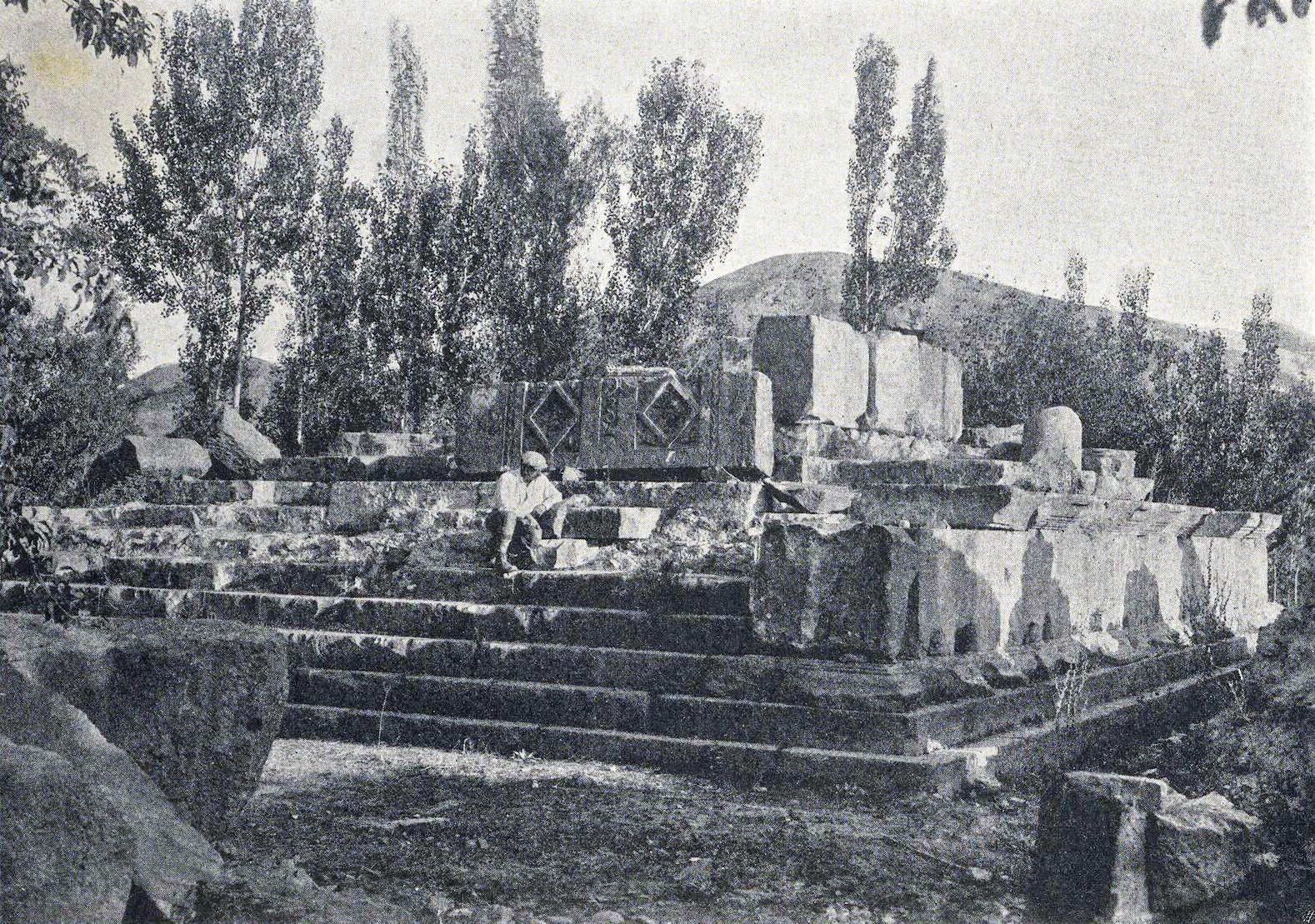
The ruins c. 1918

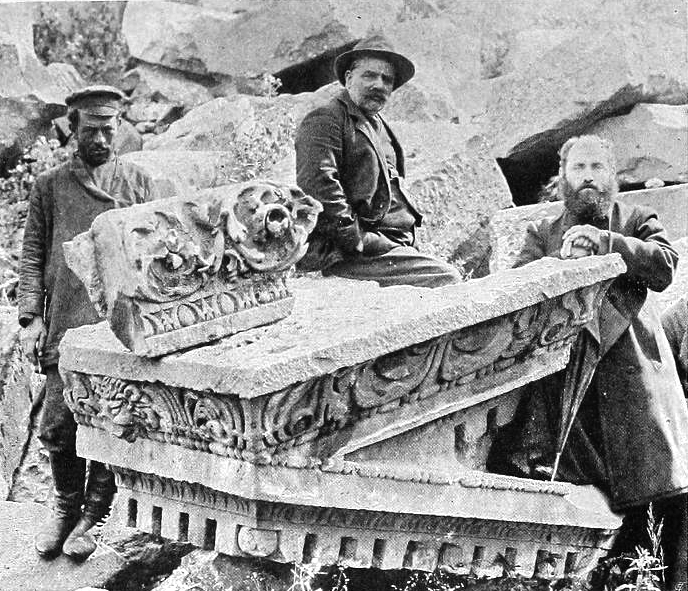
Toros Toramanian sitting on part of the pediment

European travelers Jean Chardin, who visited Armenia in 1673 before the earthquake, and James Morier, who visited in the 1810s, both incorrectly described it through local informants since they never actually visited the site. Robert Ker Porter, who visited in the late 1810s, described what he saw as a "confused pile of beautiful fragments ... all mingled together in broken disorder." He provided a drawing of the site.

Another European to visit and document the ruins of the temple was Frédéric DuBois de Montperreux, who proposed a sketch of a reconstruction of the building in his 1839 book, which later researchers criticized as inaccurate. Montperreux, who visited in March 1834, wrote that the Armenians respect the building so greatly that "no one among them would want to remove a stone, a fragment of cornice for his own use, much less let others do it." John Buchan Telfer, who visited in the 1870s, removed a fragment of the architrave bearing a lion head, (Note: It was displayed at the Royal Society of Arts in 1891.) which he bequeathed to the British Museum, where it remains to this day.

In 1880, the Russian archaeologist Aleksey Uvarov, possibly inspired by the contemporaneous relocation of the Pergamon Altar from Asia Minor to Germany, proposed that the stones be moved to Tiflis and be reconstructed there according to de Montpereux's plan. Lori Khatchadourian suggests that the proposal "could be read as an attempt at co-opting Armenia's Roman past to the glory of Russia through the relocation of its most iconic monument to the nearest administrative center." The governor of Erivan, citing technical difficulties with moving its parts, did not implement the plan and the project was abandoned.

=== Early excavations ===
Nikolai Marr led the first professional excavation in 1909–11 along with Yakov I. Smirnov and architect Konstantin K. Romanov. Kamilla Trever later wrote that these works were not archaeological excavations in the strict sense, but rather consisted mostly of uncovering, cleaning up and categorizing the fragments. Works were stopped due to lack of funds and the results, still unpublished, were reported to the Russian Archaeological Society. Romanov proposed a reconstruction of the structure in 1912 (published in 1934). While it was prepared with great care, Romanov's proposal failed to address all aspects.

Integrating a pre- and non-Christian structure into the cultural landscape took on special importance during the Soviet period. In the early 1930s, Nikoghayos Buniatian (Nikolai Buniatov) thoroughly studied the structure and developed a detailed plan for its complete reconstruction, which later researchers praised for its professionalism. Buniatian sought to completely reconstruct it, but the timing was unfavorable. Along with architect Konstantine Hovhannisyan, he partly reerected its lower sections in 1933–34, which was later found to contain numerous errors and was subsequently reverted before its eventual reconstruction.

In 1940, the Soviet Armenian government gifted an Ionic capital from Garni to the Hermitage Museum in Saint Petersburg. While considered, it was not returned during its reconstruction and remains on display there, where museum director Mikhail Piotrovsky said it appears "significantly more monumental" than at the temple.

=== Reconstruction ===
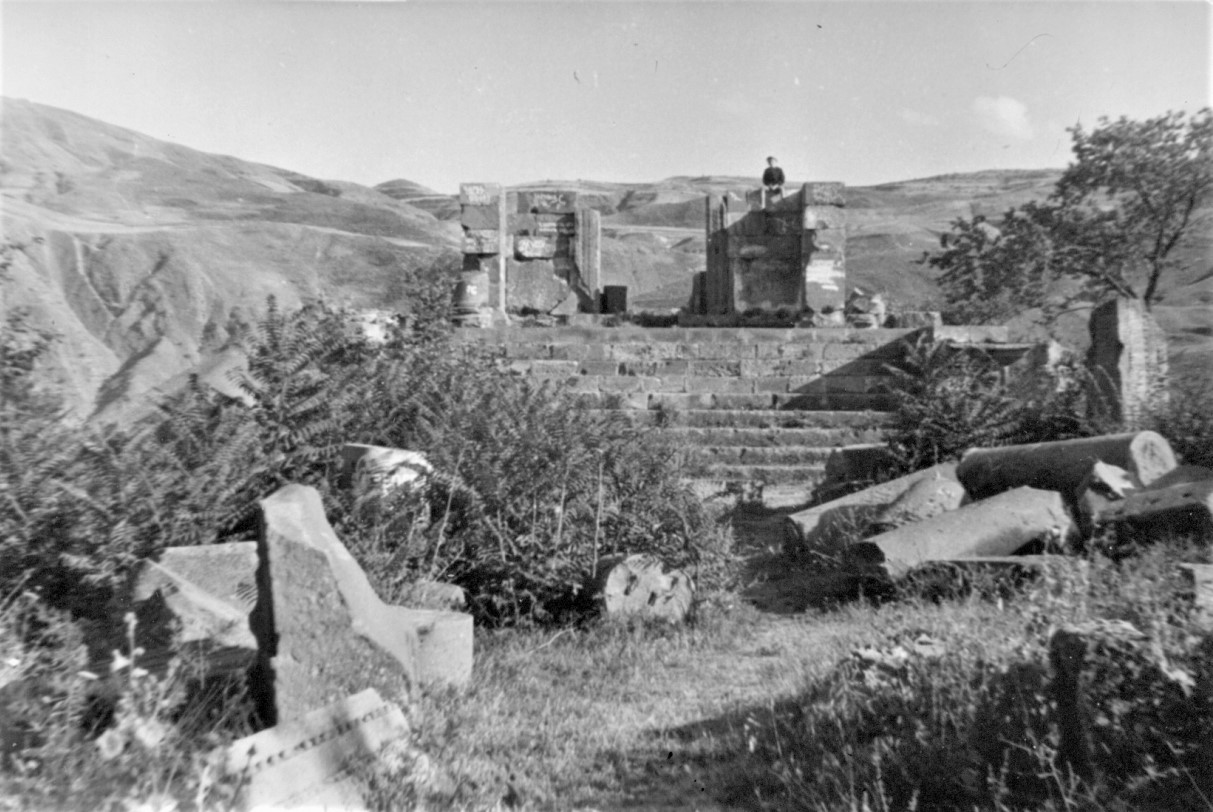
The temple ruins in 1947

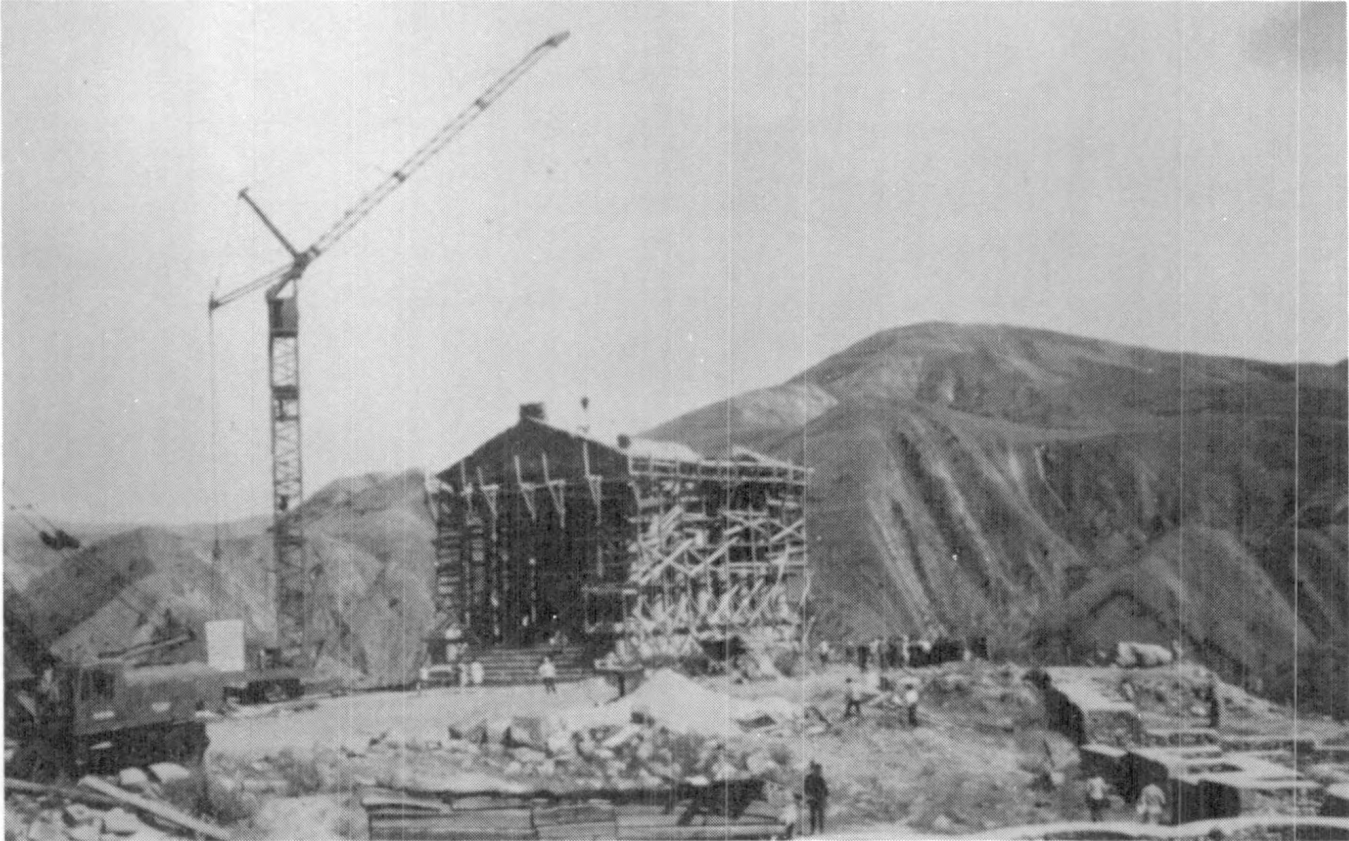
Reconstruction underway in 1974

In 1949 the Armenian Academy of Sciences began systematic excavations of the Garni fortress led by Babken Arakelyan, with Alexander Sahinian focusing on the temple itself. It was one of the flagship expeditions of Armenia's archaeological community in the post-war period. The idea of its reconstruction was brought to the forefront at the congress of Transcaucasian archaeologists and historians in Yerevan in 1956 presided by Hovsep Orbeli. In December 1968, the Soviet Armenian government officially approved the reconstruction plan of the temple and a group led by Sahinian began reconstruction works in January 1969. Reconstruction was largely completed by mid-1975, almost 300 years after it was destroyed in an earthquake.

The structure was rebuilt using its original stones, a technique known as anastylosis. Wilkinson noted that anastylosis "proved relatively straight-forward" as "so much of it had survived." The surviving pieces comprised about a third of the reconstruction, while two-thirds of new materials, which, of the same variety and color, was obtained from a local quarry; along with basalt from Parakar. Stonecutting with power saw and by hand was done onsite. Missing pieces were filled with unornamented stones to provide visual differentiation between the old and the new, making the reconstruction "quite recognizable to a trained eye". Most of the Ionic capitals had been largely preserved in their entirety, with only two heavily weathered ones being replaced with new stone. (Note: A well-preserved capital, gifted by Soviet Armenia to the Hermitage Museum in 1940 was replaced with a replica, while the original remained in Saint Petersburg.) (Note: Of the 24 plinths of the columns, ten had been preserved almost completely, eight were partly preserved (between a third and two-thirds), while six had survived in small fragments alone. The latter were replaced with new stone from the Parakar mine.) Only 40% of the column shafts had been preserved, with only two surviving completely, which were placed at the northern façade. The stones were glued with epoxy resin.

==== Reception ====
Its "re-erection and partial reconstruction" has been mostly praised by scholars. (Note: John A. C. Greppin: "quite an impressive job" Yves Thoraval: "perfectly restored" Jean-Michel Thierry: "very well restored" Michael Greenhalgh: "almost perfect reconstruction" Maxim Atayants: exemplary.) Henry A. Judd, Chief Historical Architect of the U.S. National Park Service who visited in 1974, praised the lack of attempt at "fakery or antiquing" as an "admirable approach". Bagrat Ulubabyan wrote that the costly reconstruction did not compromise the structure's original architectural or artistic merits. In 1988, three Soviet archaeologists noted that, although there was once debate over whether the structure should be seen as an "authentic monument" or a "modern replica," it has since gained acceptance and legitimacy in contemporary culture and scholarly circles as a genuine historical monument.

Giusto Traina suggested that the reconstruction was hasty, while Taline Ter Minassian said it was excessive. Magarditchian judged the anastylosis to have been carefully executed, including the acceptable placement of decorated blocks, but found the pseudo-adyton and reconstruction of the roof problematic.

For drawing up and supervising the project, Sahinian was awarded the State Prize of the Armenian SSR in 1975. In 1978 a fountain-monument dedicated to Sahinian's reconstruction was erected near the temple.

== Architecture ==
=== Style and dimensions ===
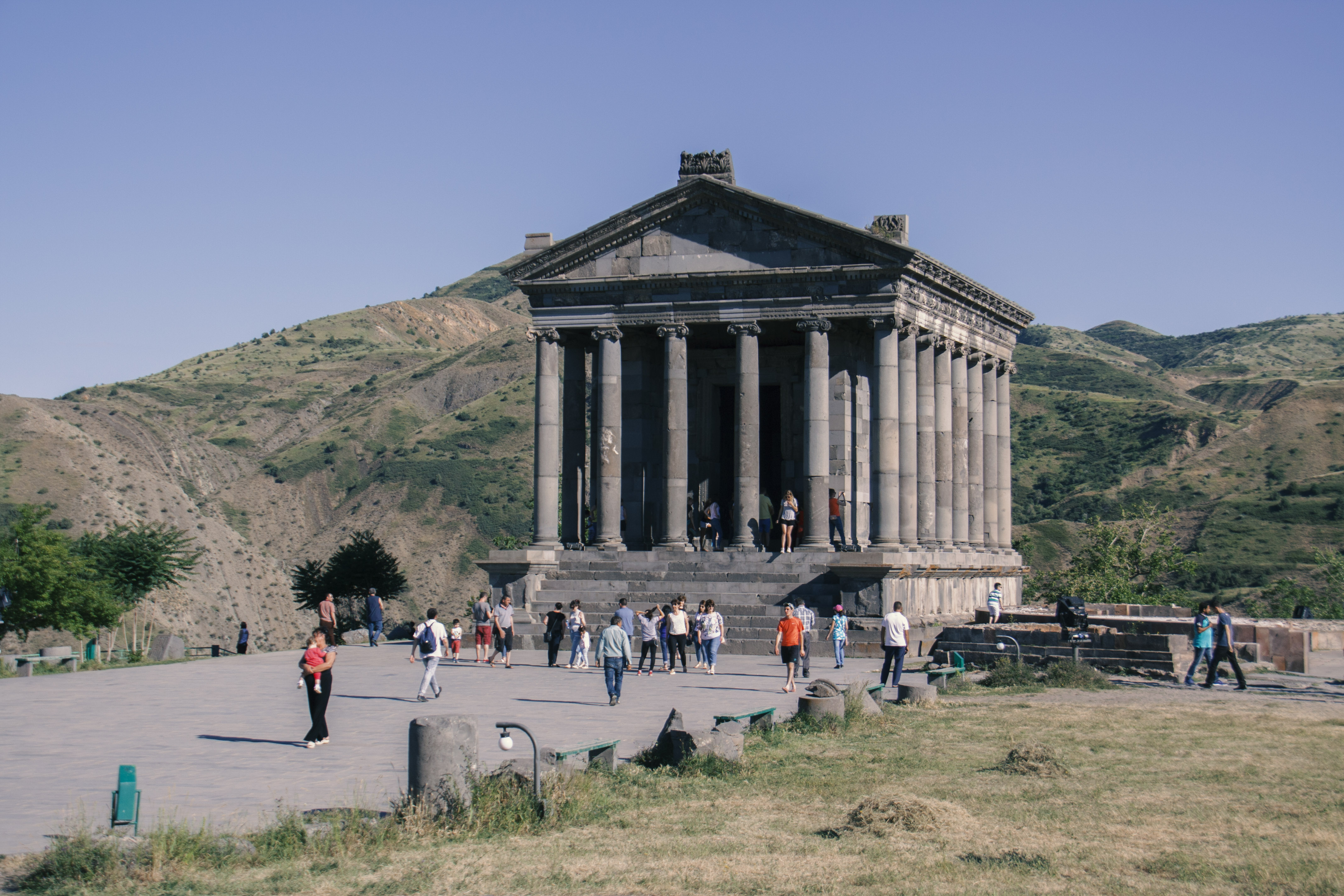
A typical view of the temple

It follows the general style of classical Ancient Greek architecture and has been described as Greek, Roman, Greco-Roman, or Hellenistic. Natalie Kampen noted that it "shares a Graeco-Roman vocabulary with the use of basalt rather than marble." Sirarpie Der Nersessian argued that the temple, of a Roman type, "lies outside the line of development of Armenian architecture." Toros Toramanian stressed the singularity of the temple as a Roman-style building in the Armenian Highlands and noted that it "essentially had no influence on contemporary or subsequent Armenian architecture."

Sahinian, the architect who oversaw its reconstruction, emphasized the local Armenian influence on its architecture, calling it an "Armenian-Hellenic" monument. He further insisted on a direct compositional link to the Urartian Musasir temple, which Stepan Mnatsakanian criticized. Based on a comparative analysis, Sahinian also proposed that the design of the columns have their origins in Asia Minor. Maranci notes that its entablature is similar to that of the temple of Antoninus Pius at Sagalassos in western Asia Minor and to the columns of Attalia.

The temple's compact size has drawn comparisons to the Roman Maison carrée in Nîmes, France. Joël Schmidt praised its "harmonious, human-sized proportions", while William H. McNeill dismissed it as "undistinguished". Claude Cox described it as "delicate", and Dickran Kouymjian admired the "elegance of its proportions".

Much of its decorative style—and classical architecture more broadly—influenced early Armenian church design before 650. Motifs from Garni reappeared in Soviet-era architecture, such as the 1950s Hotel Armenia on Republic (Lenin) Square and various apartment buildings across Yerevan.

=== Exterior ===
The temple is constructed of locally quarried grey to bluish basalt, assembled without the use of mortar. Instead, the blocks, many weighing up to 5 tons, are bound together by iron and bronze clamps. It is a peripteros, composed of a colonnaded portico (pronaos) and an open cella (naos), erected on an elevated podium (base). The podium, measuring 15.7 by 11.5 m (52 by 38 ft) and standing 2.8–3 m (9 ft 2 in – 9 ft 10 in) above ground, is supported by a total of twenty-four Ionic order columns, each 6.54 m (21.5 ft) high: six in the front and back, and eight on the sides (with the corner columns counted twice). The structure rises 10.7 metres (35 ft), comparable to a four-story building.

Unlike typical temples, its facade is oriented north—not east. There is a 8–8.5 m (26–28 ft) wide stairway on the northern side leading to the chamber. It consists of nine steep steps, each measuring 30 cm (12 in) in height—approximately twice the average step height. Tananyan proposes that ascending these steps compels individuals to feel humbled and exert physical effort to reach the altar. On both sides of the stairway, there are roughly square pedestals. Sculpted on both of these pedestals is Atlas, the Greek mythological Titan who bore the weight of the earth, seemingly attempting to support the entire temple on its shoulders. Originally, it is assumed that these pedestals served the purpose of holding up altars, sacrificial tables.

The exterior of the temple is richly decorated. The triangular pediment contains sculptures of plants and geometrical figures. The frieze depicts a continuous line of acanthus. Furthermore, there are ornaments on the capital, architrave, and soffit. The stones in the front cornice have projecting sculptures of lion heads. Sirarpie Der Nersessian argued that its "rich acanthus scrolls, with interposed lion masks and occasional palmettes, the fine Ionic and acanthus capitals, the other floral and geometric ornaments, are typical of the contemporary monuments of Asia Minor."

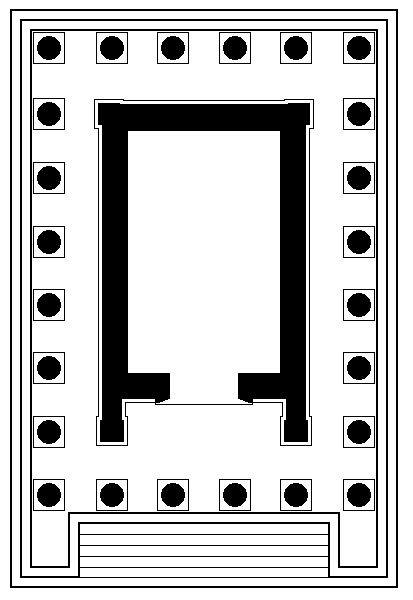
Ground plan

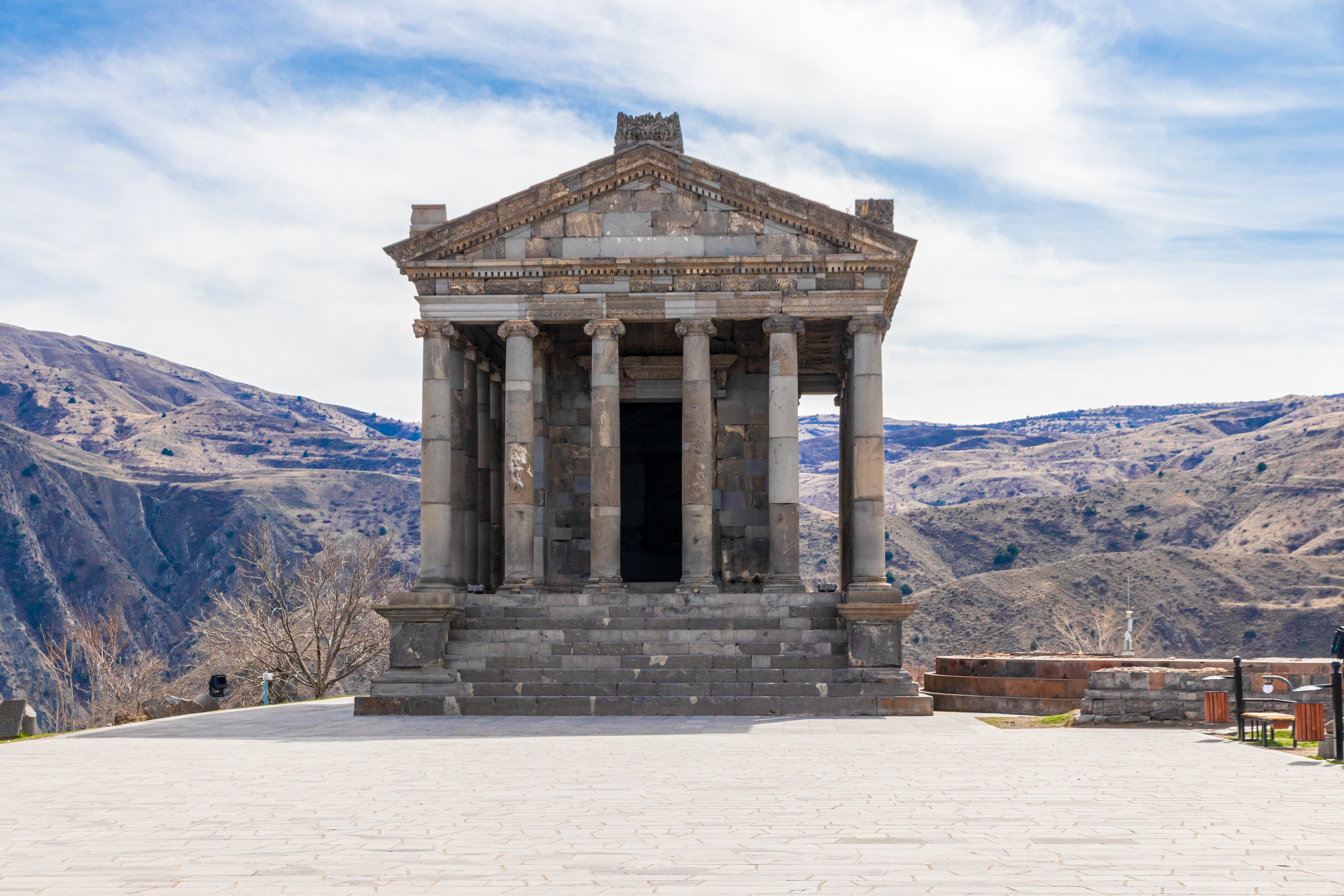
Front view

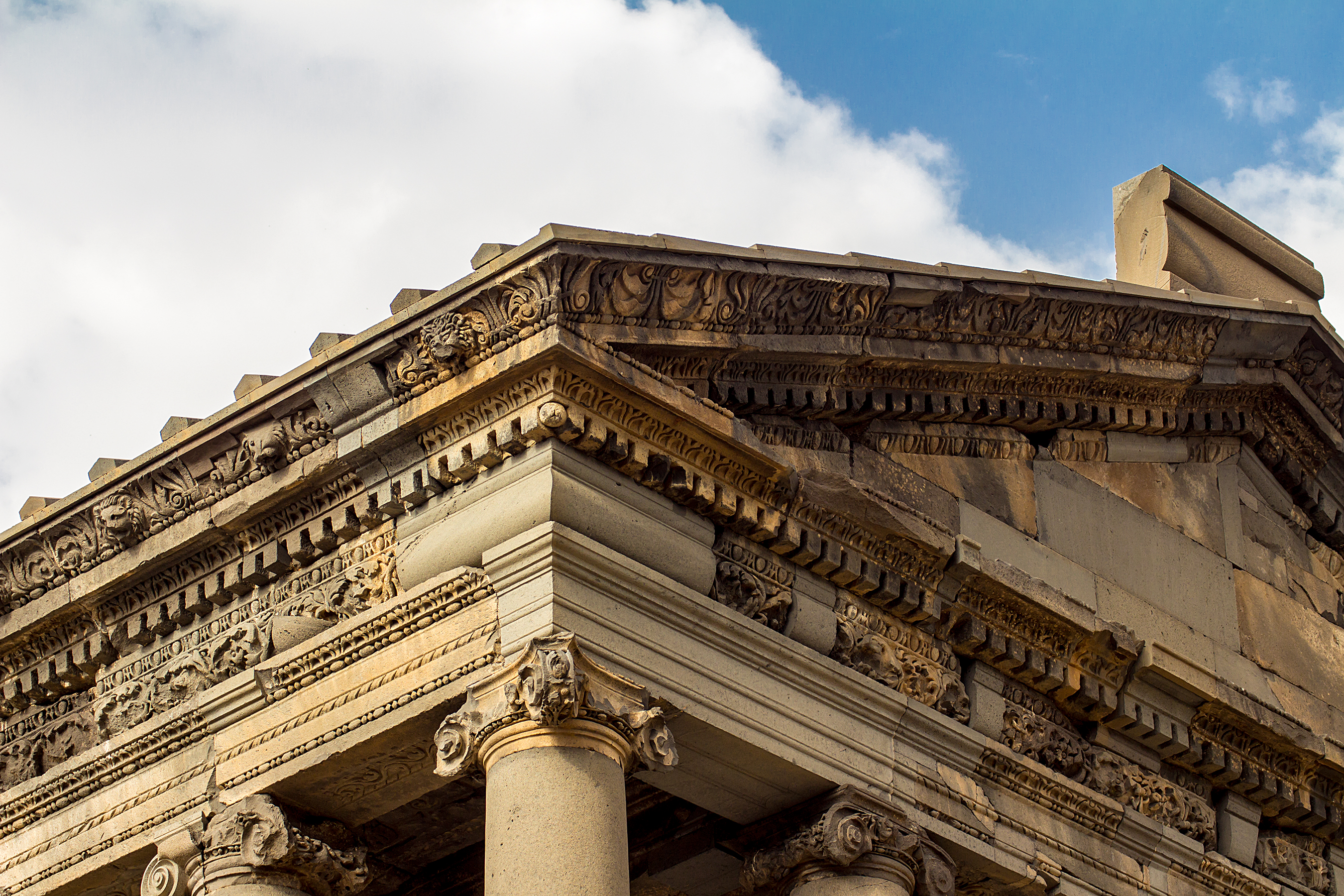
Oblique view

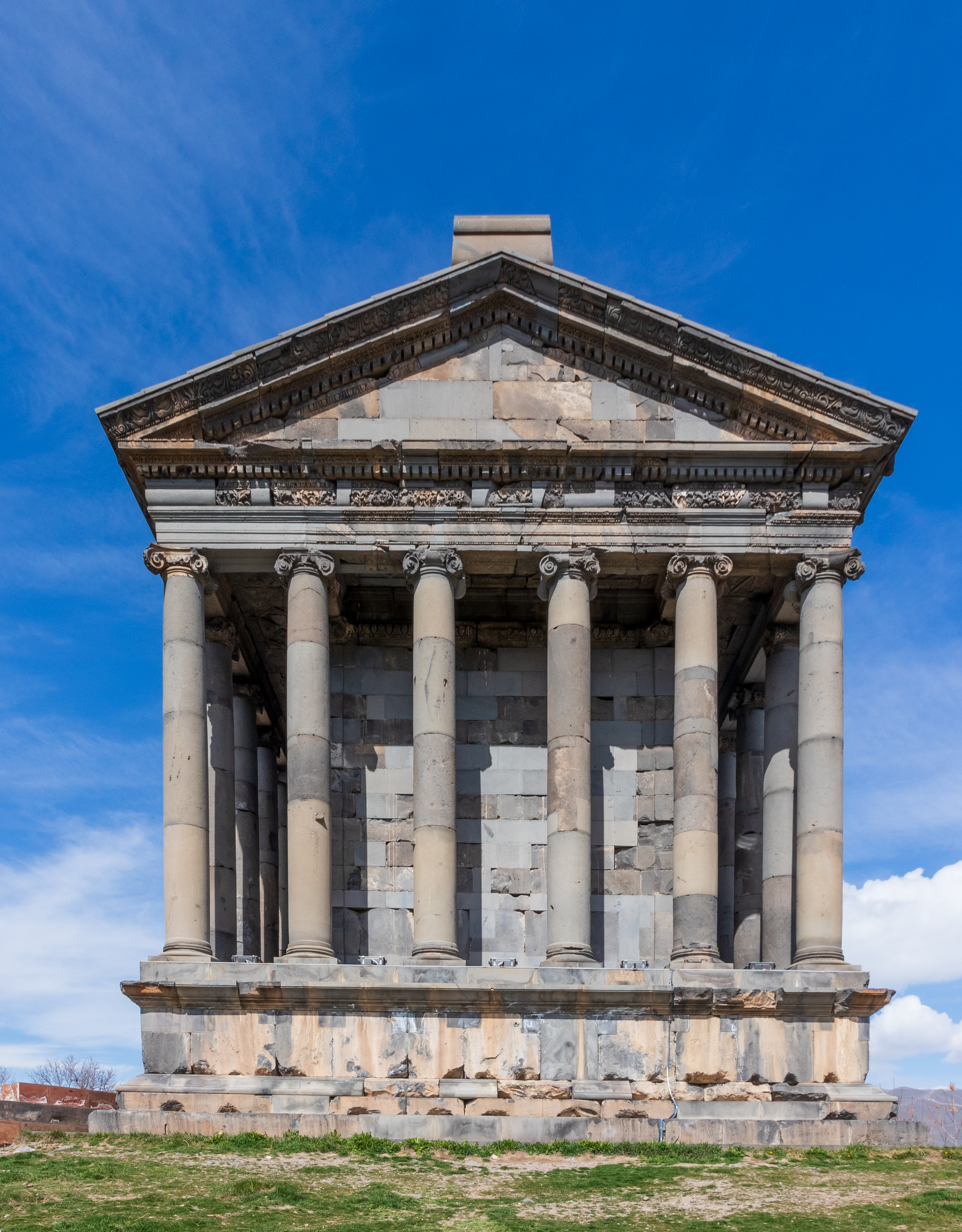
Rear view

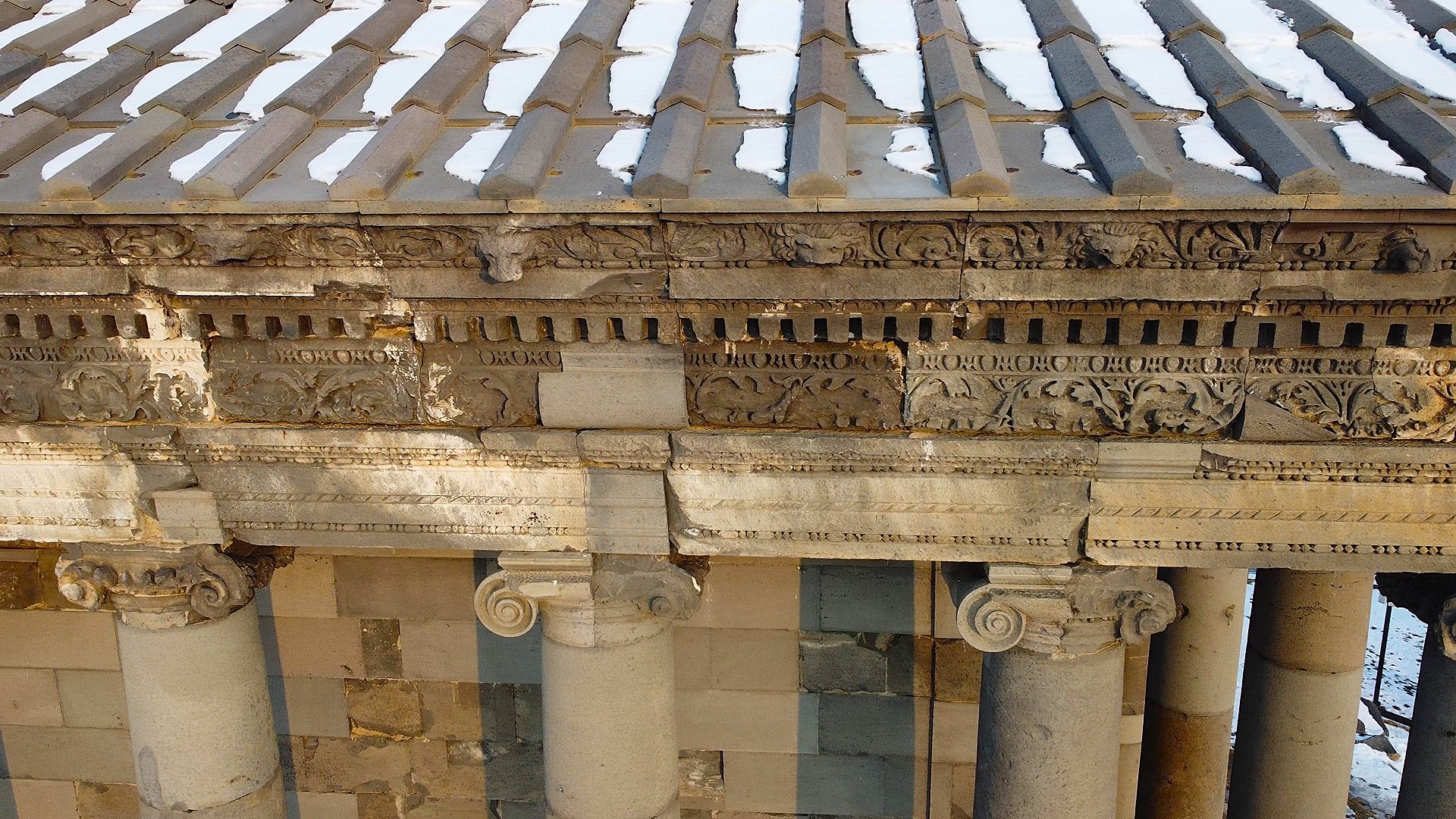
Fragment of frieze

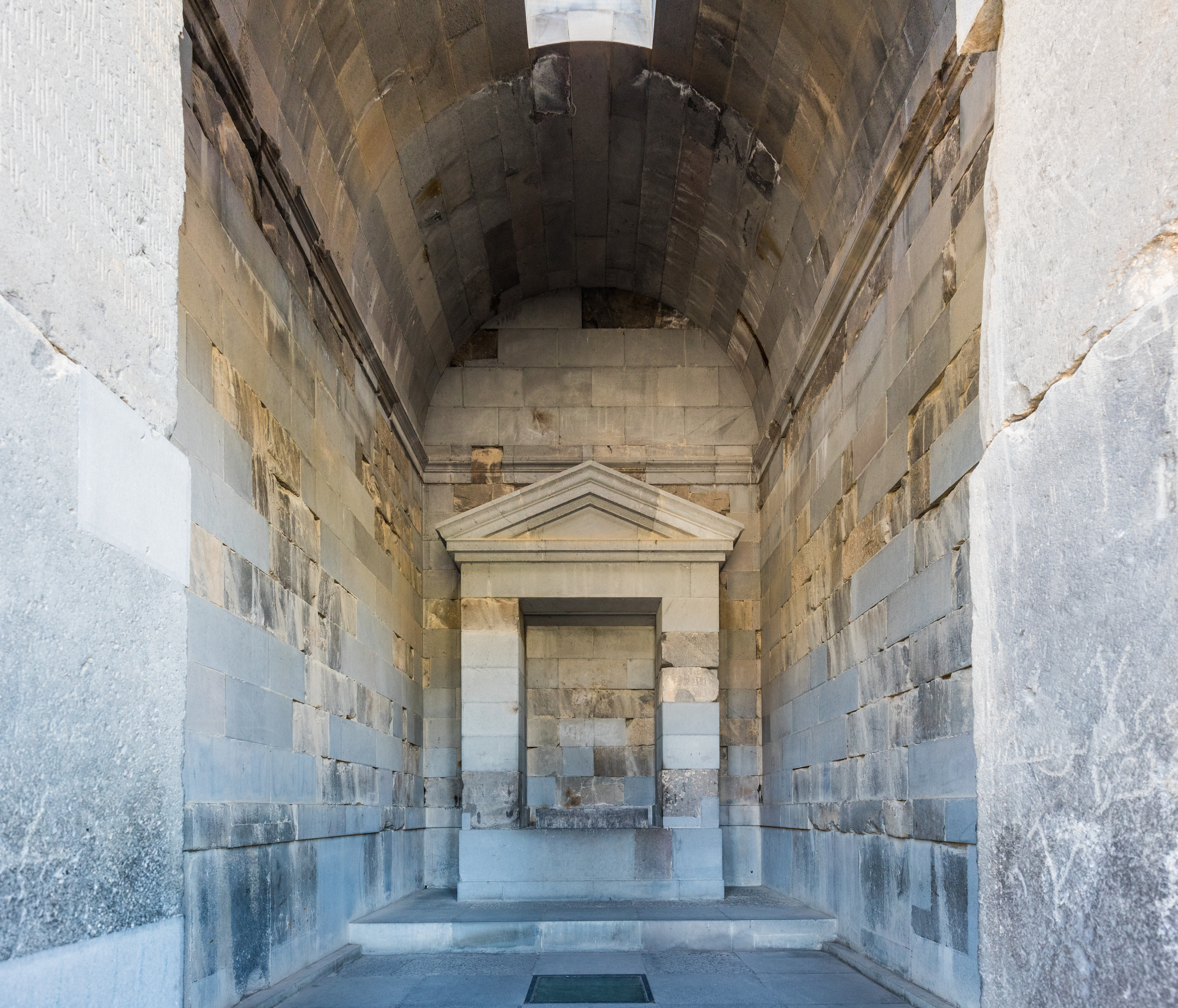
The cella

=== Cella ===
The cella of the temple is 7.13 m (23.4 ft) high, 7.98 m (26.2 ft) long, and 5.05 m (16.6 ft) wide. It covers an area of 40.3 m^{2} (434 sq ft). Due to its small size, it has been proposed that a statue once stood inside and ceremonies were held outside. The cella is lit from two sources: the disproportionately large entrance of 2.29 by 4.68 metres (7 ft 6 in by 15 ft 4 in) and the opening in the roof of 1.74 by 1.26 metres (5.7 by 4.1 ft).

== Significance ==
Garni is the sole extant Greco-Roman colonnaded structure in Armenia and, more broadly, within the territory of the former Soviet Union. Standing as a testament to Armenia's connections with the Greco-Roman world, it is regarded as the most significant monument of pre-Christian and ancient Armenian heritage. Giusto Traina remarked that its architectural style "gives the impression of standing in an outpost of Western civilization", suggesting that it evokes a stronger sense of national pride among Armenians than even the legacy of Tigranes the Great.

It has been often cited as one of the most remote pieces of Greek architecture. Malcolm Colledge identified it as one of the most distant examples of Ionic architecture, alongside those on Failaka Island (Kuwait) and the Jandial temple in Taxila (Pakistan). Antony Eastmond described it as "the easternmost building of the Graeco-Roman world".

Traina suggested that its reconstruction was motivated by the desire of Soviet Armenian archaeologists to emphasize that the grandeur of Armenia did not begin with Christianity. Along with the Urartian site of Erebuni, its reconstruction was heavily propagated by the Communist leaders of Armenia. (Note: Its reconstruction was specifically called to attention by Armenia's Communist leader (First Secretary) Karen Demirchyan and Prime Minister (Chairman of the Council of Ministers) Fadey Sargsyan.) Garni, like Erebuni, was reconstructed during a period of national revival in Soviet Armenia in the 1960s and became a site of national pride, with the restored monument transformed into a backdrop for festivities and cultural performances. Adam T. Smith observed that restoring Erebuni and reconstructing Garni fostered "tourist patriotism" that celebrated historical achievements without encouraging nationalist sentiments.

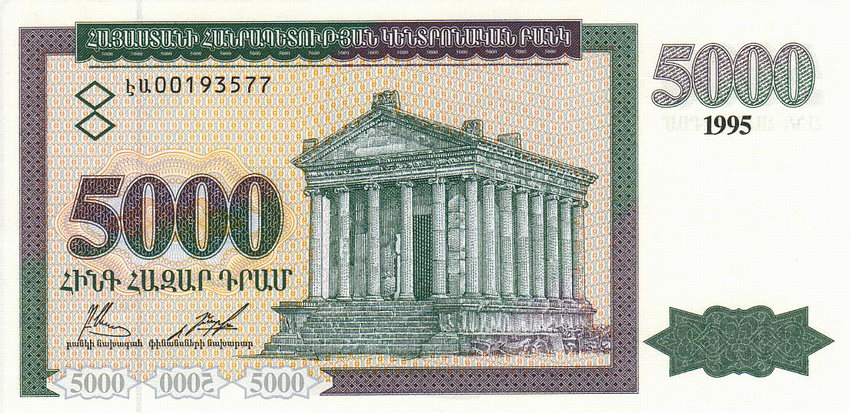
A 5,000 Armenian dram banknote from 1995 featuring the temple

Its status as a symbol of Armenian antiquity has further solidified in independent Armenia. It has appeared on a 1993 stamp and an uncirculated 1994 silver commemorative coin. Garni and Satala Aphrodite (attributed to Anahit) were depicted on the 5,000 dram banknote in circulation from 1995 to 2005. The torch of the first Pan-Armenian Games was lit near the temple on August 28, 1999, from where it was taken to Hrazdan Stadium in Yerevan.

In March 2025 Armenia submitted "The Archaeological Complex of Garni and the ‘Basalt Organ’ Columnar Joint" (the "symphony of stones") to the tentative list of the UNESCO World Heritage Sites, signaling its intention for future nomination. It was confirmed as a tentative site in July 2025.

=== Tourist attraction ===
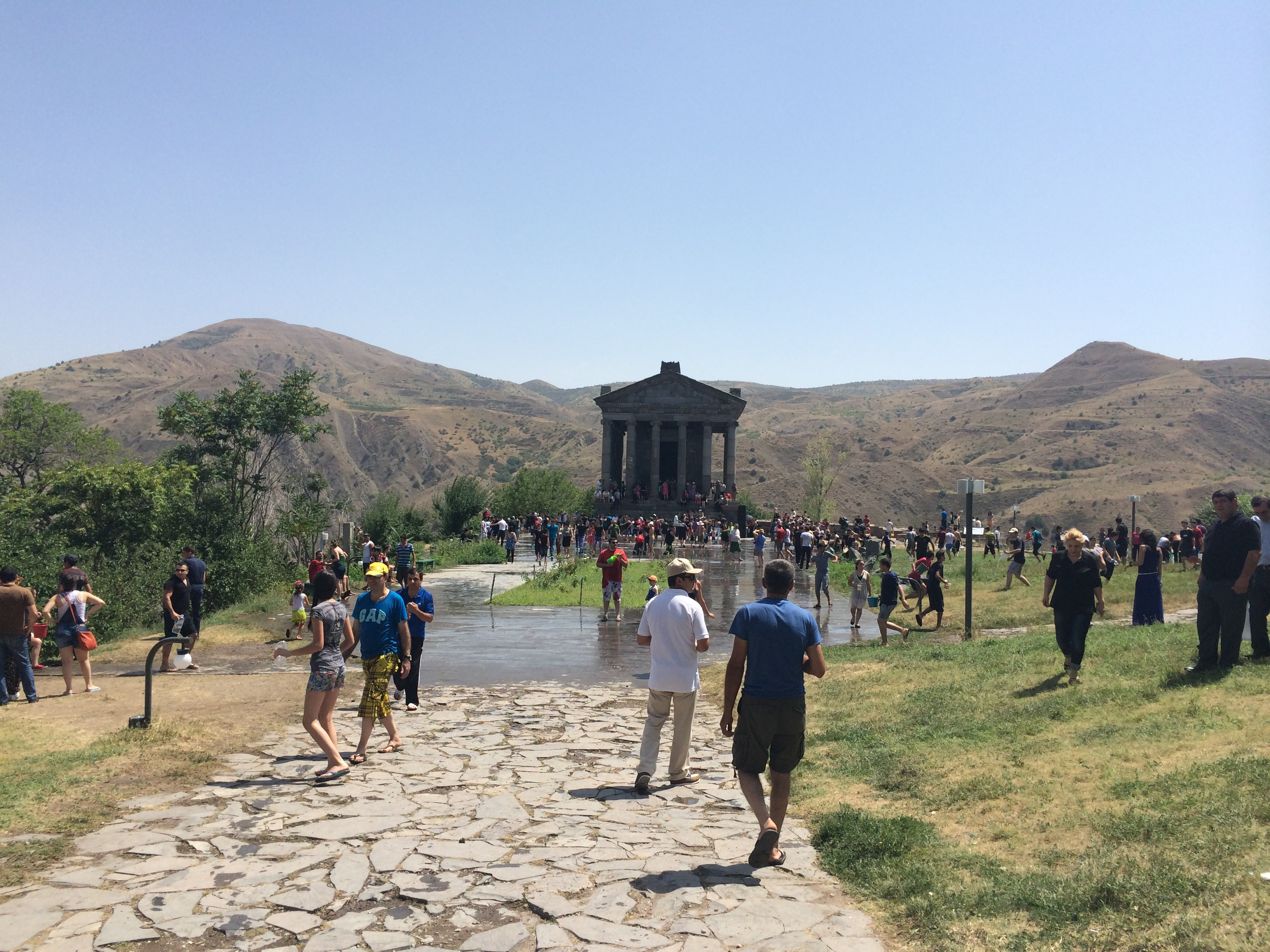
Vardavar, a popular summer festival of pre-Christian origin, being celebrated near the temple in 2014

By the mid-20th century, even before its reconstruction, it had already become a major tourist destination, attracting tens of thousands of visitors by the early 1970s. Today, it remains one of Armenia's most visited sites, along with the nearby medieval monastery of Geghard. Many visitors choose to visit both locations, collectively known as Garni–Geghard, on a day trip from Yerevan. Some 200,000 people visited the temple in 2013. The number nearly doubled by 2019, prior to the COVID-19 pandemic, when Garni received almost 390,000 visitors, including 250,000 Armenians and 137,400 foreigners. Among its visitors have been multiple presidents (Note: including Boris Yeltsin of Russia, Karolos Papoulias of Greece, Demetris Christofias of Cyprus, and Heinz Fischer of Austria.) and high-profile entertainers. (Note: Spanish opera singer Montserrat Caballé, American TV personalities Khloé and Kim Kardashian, and Conan O'Brien, Russian pop star Philipp Kirkorov.)

=== Neopagan shrine ===
Since 1990, the temple has been the central shrine of the small number of followers of Armenian neopaganism (close to Zoroastrianism) who hold annual ceremonies at the temple, especially on March 21—the pagan New Year. On that day, which coincides with Nowruz, the Iranian New Year, Armenian neopagans celebrate the birthday of the god of fire, Vahagn. Celebrations by neopagans are also held during the summer festival of Vardavar, which has pre-Christian (pagan) origins. Neopagans celebrated the "return" of Satala Aphrodite, attributed to Anahit, at the temple in September 2024 when the bronze head was brought to Armenia for temporary exhibition.

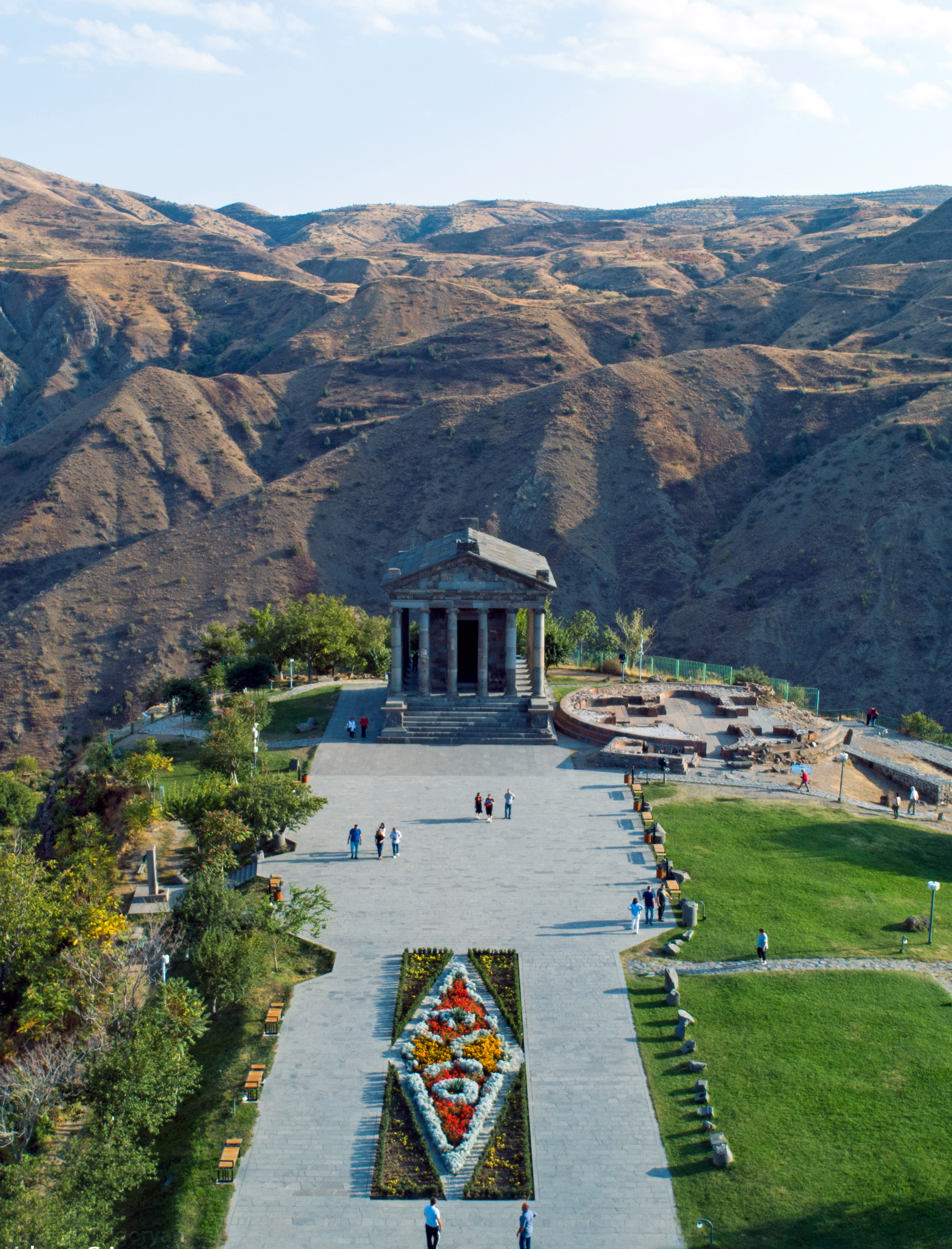
An aerial view

=== Preservation ===
The temple and the fortress are part of the Garni Historical and Cultural Museum Reserve, which occupies 3.5 hectares (8.6 acres) and is supervised by the Service for the Protection of Historical Environment and Cultural Museum Reservations, an agency of the Armenian Ministry of Culture. The government-approved list of historical and cultural monuments includes 11 objects within the site. In a 2006 survey the state of conservation of Garni was rated by over three-quarters of the visitors as "good" or "very good". In 2011 UNESCO awarded the Museum-Reservation of Garni the Melina Mercouri International Prize for the Safeguarding and Management of Cultural Landscapes for "measures taken to preserve its cultural vestiges, and the emphasis placed on efforts to interpret and open the site for national and international visitors."

In September 2014, a Russian tourist spray painted on the temple, which was cleaned days later and the tourist was fined. In September 2021, the site was closed for a visitors for a day for a private wedding ceremony, causing much controversy.

== In arts and popular culture ==
The site has occasionally served as a concert venue, including for the Soviet music festival Pesnya goda featuring pop icon Alla Pugacheva (1985), Armenia's National Chamber Orchestra (2004), and a rave featuring music by Acid Pauli (2019).

Paintings

Its ruins are depicted on paintings by Robert Ker Porter (1821), Yeghishe Tadevosyan (1930), Hovhannes Minasyan (1966), Ruben Bedrosov (1969). The temple and Tiridates' Greek inscription are portrayed in a mural crafted by Van Khachatur in 1959, inside the Matenadaran in Yerevan, symbolizing Armenia's Hellenistic period. A 1972 painting by Gabriel Gyurjian depicts the temple with an idealized reconstruction of the fortress walls. (Note: The painting is also reproduced here.)

Film and television

The ruins of the temple are depicted in the 1962 Soviet Armenian film Rings of Glory (Кольца славы), featuring the Olympic gymnast Albert Azaryan, and in the 1966 Soviet Armenian anthology film People of the Same City (Նույն քաղաքի մարդիկ) featuring Armen Dzhigarkhanyan. The reconstructed temple appears in the 1985 Polish film Travels of Mr. Kleks (Podróże Pana Kleksa) and the 1986 Soviet musical film A Merry Chronicle of a Dangerous Voyage (Весёлая хроника опасного путешествия).

In the 2002 film Herostratus, a U.S.-Armenia co-production, director Ruben Kochar made "great, atmospheric use of unique locations unfamiliar to Western audiences", including Garni. Garni features prominently in the 2007 Vigen Chaldranyan film The Priestess (Քրմուհին), where the priestess of the temple (portrayed by Ruzan Vit Mesropyan) commits adultery and is consequently expelled from it. Temple of Sun (Արևի տաճար) is a 2008 documentary about the structure by Shavarsh Vardanyan. The 2022 Indian action film Rashtra Kavach Om, partially filmed in Armenia, features the Garni temple along with other landmarks in the country.

American comedian Conan O'Brien and his assistant Sona Movsesian filmed part of an episode dancing at the temple during their visit in October 2015. It aired on his late-night talk show on November 17, 2015, and scored 1.3 million viewers. In episode 6 ("Let the Good Times Roll") of the American reality show The Amazing Race 28, first aired on April 1, 2016, the contestants make a pit stop at the temple.

== See also ==
- List of Ancient Greek temples
- List of Ancient Roman temples

== Bibliography ==
Books and chapters about Garni

- Bouniatoff, N. [in Russian] (1933). Հեթանոսական տաճար Տրդատի պալատին կից Գառնի ամրոցում = Языческий храм при дворце Трдата в крепости Гарни = Temple païen à côté du palais de Tiridate dans la citadelle de Garni (in Armenian, Russian, and French). Yerevan: Melkonian Fund. (PDF, archived)
- Sahinian, A. A. (1983). Գառնիի անտիկ կառույցների ճարտարապետությունը [The Architecture of Garni's Ancient Structures] (in Armenian). Yerevan: Academy of Sciences of the Armenian SSR. Archived from the original on 2024-01-12.
- Trever, Kamilla (1953). Orbeli, I. A. (ed.). Очерки по истории культуры древней Армении (II в. до н. э. — IV в. н. э.) [Essays on the history of the culture of ancient Armenia (II century BC - IV century AD)] (PDF) (in Russian). Moscow: Soviet Academy of Sciences Press. Archived from the original (PDF) on 19 November 2021.
- Ter Minassian, Taline [in French] (2013). "La restauration soviétique du temple antique de Garni (Arménie) : un paradigme patrimonial? [The Soviet restoration of the ancient temple of Garni (Armenia): a heritage paradigm?]". Patrimoine & Architecture dans les États post-soviétiques [Heritage & Architecture in Post-Soviet states] (in French). Presses Universitaires de Rennes. pp. 25–43. ISBN 9782753526426.

General books

- Canepa, Matthew P. (2018). The Iranian Expanse: Transforming Royal Identity through Architecture, Landscape, and the Built Environment, 550 BCE–642 CE. Oakland: University of California Press. pp. 115-118. ISBN 978-0-520-29003-7.
- Panossian, Razmik (2006). The Armenians: From Kings and Priests to Merchants and Commissars. New York: Columbia University Press. ISBN 978-0-231-13926-7.
- Nersessian, Vrej (2001). Treasures from the Ark: 1700 Years of Armenian Christian Art. Los Angeles: J. Paul Getty Museum. ISBN 978-0-89236-639-2.
- Bauer-Manndorff, Elisabeth (1981). Armenia: Past and Present. Lucerne: Reich Verlag.
- Russell, James R. (1987). Zoroastrianism in Armenia. Cambridge, Massachusetts: Harvard University Press. ISBN 978-0-674-96850-9.
- Strzygowski, Josef (1918). Die Baukunst der Armenier und Europa [The Architecture of the Armenians and of Europe] Volume 1 (in German). Vienna: Kunstverlag Anton Schroll & Co.
- Porter, Robert Ker (1821). Travels in Georgia, Persia, Armenia, ancient Babylonia, &c. &c. Volume II. London: Longman, Hurst, Rees, Orme, and Brown.
- Kiesling, Brady (2000). Rediscovering Armenia: An Archaeological/Touristic Gazetteer and Map Set for the Historical Monuments of Armenia (PDF). Yerevan/Washington DC: Embassy of the United States of America to Armenia. Archived from the original (PDF) on 2006-05-03.
- Lang, David Marshall (1970). Armenia: Cradle of Civilization. London: Allen & Unwin.
- Harutyunyan, Varazdat (1992). Հայկական ճարտարապետության պատմություն [History of Armenian Architecture] (PDF) (in Armenian). Yerevan: Luys. ISBN 5-545-00215-4. Archived from the original (PDF) on 2 January 2022. Alt URL
- Der Nersessian, Sirarpie (1969). The Armenians. London: Thames & Hudson.
- Khachatryan, Zhores (2001). "Գառնիի տաճարը հերեո՞ն, վկայարա՞ն". Հայոց սրբերը և սրբավայրերը [Armenian Saints and Sanctuaries] (PDF) (in Armenian). Yerevan: Hayastan. pp. 244–254. ISBN 5-540-01771-4. Archived from the original (PDF) on 2022-08-07.
- Hewsen, Robert H. (2001). Armenia: A Historical Atlas. Chicago: University of Chicago Press. ISBN 978-0-226-33228-4.
- Thierry, Jean-Michel; Donabédian, Patrick (1989) [1987]. Armenian Art. Translated by Celestine Dars. New York: Harry N. Abrams. ISBN 0-8109-0625-2.

Journal articles

- Abrahamian, A. G. (1947). Գառնիի հունարեն արձանագրությունը [The Greek inscription of Garni]. Etchmiadzin (in Armenian). 4 (3–4): 61–72. Archived from the original on 2021-02-25.
- Khatchadourian, Lori (2008). "Making Nations from the Ground up: Traditions of Classical Archaeology in the South Caucasus". American Journal of Archaeology. 112 (2): 247–278. doi:10.3764/aja.112.2.247. JSTOR 20627449. S2CID 163627047.
- Manandian, Hakob (1946). Գառնիի հունարեն արձանագրությունը և Գառնիի հեթանոսական տաճարի կառուցման ժամանակը [The Greek inscription of Garni and the construction date of the pagan temple of Garni] (in Armenian). Yerevan: State University Press. (PDF)
- Tananyan, Grigor (2014). Գառնի պատմամշակութային կոթողը (տաճարի վերականգման 40-ամյակի առթիվ) [The Historic & Cultural Monument of Garni (to the 40th anniversary of the restoration of the temple)]. Patma-Banasirakan Handes (in Armenian). 2 (2): 25–45. Archived from the original on 2016-03-04.
- Sahinian, Alexander (1979a). "Գառնիի անտիկ տաճարի վերականգնումը [The Reconstruction of the Ancient Temple of Garni]". Lraber Hasarakakan Gitutyunneri (in Armenian). 10 (10): 59–74. ISSN 0320-8117. Archived from the original on 2016-03-04.
- Trever, Kamilla (1949). "К вопросу об античном храме в Гарни (Армения) [On the issue of the ancient temple in Garni (Armenia)]" (PDF). Sovetskaya arkheologiya (in Russian). XI: 285–304. Archived from the original on 2024-09-06.()
- Wilkinson, R. D. (1982). "A Fresh Look at the Ionic Building at Garni". Revue des Études Arméniennes (XVI): 221–244.
- Magarditchian, Armenuhi (2017). "Gaṙni: Temple romain - baptistère chrétien". Revue des Études Arméniennes (in French). 37: 173–211. doi:10.2143/REA.37.0.3237123.
- Mnatsakanian, Stepan (1984). "Ա. Ա. Սահինյան, Գառնիի անտիկ կառույցների ճարտարապետությունը, ՀՍՍՀ ԳԱ հրատարակչություն, Երևան, 1983 [A. A. Sahinian, Architecture of antique constructions of Garni]". Lraber Hasarakakan Gitutyunneri (in Armenian) (9): 91–94. Archived from the original on 12 January 2024.
