= Murad Hasratyan =

Armenian architectural historian (1935–2026)

- Մուրադ Հասրաթյան
- Born: 20 June 1935; Yerevan, Armenian SSR, Transcaucasian SFSR, USSR
- Died: 16 January 2026 (aged 90)
- Education: National Polytechnic University of Armenia
- Occupations: Architect, architectural historian
- Years active: 1958–2026
- Organization(s): Yerevan Project Institute, Institute of Art of National Academy of Sciences of RA, State Academy of Fine Arts of Armenia, Yerevan State University
- Known for: prominent architect
- Parent: Morus Hasratyan (father)
- Awards: Prime Minister's medal, State Prize of Armenia

Murad Hasratyan (Armenian: Մուրադ Հասրաթյան; 20 June 1935 – 16 January 2026) was an Armenian architectural historian.

== Background ==
Hasratyan was born in Yerevan on 20 June 1935, to an educated family. His father, Morus Hasratyan, was a renowned historian and philologist, honorary figure of the Armenian SSR, the first student of the Faculty of History at Yerevan State University and the Director of History Museum of Armenia.

In 1958, Murad graduated from the Architecture Department of the Yerevan Polytechnic Institute with a diploma of excellence, receiving the qualification "Architect".

At the institute he was taught by the professors Rafayel Israyelyan, Samvel Safaryan, Varazdat Harutyunyan, and the head of his diploma work was Mikayel Mazmanyan.

Hasratyan died on 16 January 2026, at the age of 90.

== Career ==
As a senior architect, he started to work at the newly opened Yerevan Project Institute, in Gevorg Tamanyan studio. He designed several projects: residential and administrative buildings, schools (after Shirvanzade–1961), designed the plans of the settlement after Lukashin and the settlements of Kanaker Hydro Power Plant (1959–1961).

From 1964, he worked at Academy of Arts of the Academy of Sciences of Armenia as a junior researcher and then became the Scientific Secretary of the Institute.

In 1969 he became a Candidate of Sciences after defending his thesis on "Architectural complexes of Syunik region 16-18th centuries".

He headed the Architecture Department of the Institute of Arts of the Armenian Academy of Sciences from 1988.

From 1999 he taught at the Yerevan State university.

== Research ==
Hasratyan measured around 150 monuments in Armenia.

He was the first one to research and put into scientific circulation: Tashi’s monument, early medieval monuments of Ddmashen, Sarakap, the monasteries in Artsakh- Amaras, Dadivank, Khratravank, Gandzasar Monastery, Gtchavank, and numerous churches, including the famous Ghazanchetsots Cathedral, have been measured by the medieval Armenian architectural monuments of the Nagorno-Karabakh region.

In Nakhichevan, Hasratyan has been measuring, analyzing, and putting in scientific circulation many monuments, including the Astrapid Red Monastery, which had been destroyed by the “owners” of Nakhichevan not long after and continues to exist only in M. Hasratyan's assessments and descriptions.

He was the first to explore the Armenian-Byzantine, Armenian-Georgian, Armenian-Iranian architectural relations.

== Books ==
Hasratyan was the author of nearly two dozen books, numerous brochures, hundreds of articles, theses, reviews and encyclopedia articles published in Armenia, Moscow, Kiev, Tbilisi, Paris, Lyon, Vienna, Lisbon, Rome, Venice, Milan, Bologna, Naples, Montreal, Yokohama, Ankara.

Hasratyan's first book was about the architecture of Yerevan, his birthplace, which was published in Moscow on the 2750th anniversary of the founding of Yerevan in 1968, in co-authorship with Varazdat Harutyunyan and Arsen Melikyan.

The same composition of the author was published in Moscow in 1972 (specifically on the 50th anniversary of the USSR) "Architecture of Soviet Armenia".

For the collective fundamental work of "History of Armenian Art", which included sections dedicated to the history of Armenian architecture, Hasratyan was awarded the 2009 State Prize in Fine Arts.

Murad was also the co-author of several Armenian architectural history works ("Yerevan", in Russian, 1968, “Architecture of Soviet Armenia", in 1972, “Kecharis”, in English and Italian, 1982 “Gandzasar”).

== Memberships ==
1998: Associate member of Armenia's engineering academy

2006: associate member in the National Academy of Sciences of RA

2015: Associate member of the International Academy of Architecture

== Awards ==
- State Prize of Armenia, 2009
- Gold Medal of Yerevan
- National Academy of Sciences of Armenia, Prize after Toros Toramanyan for his work “Armenian architecture during Early Christianity period", Moscow 2010
- Prime Minister's Commemorative Medal
- Central Committee prize winner (1971)
- Doctor of Architecture (1993)

== See also ==
- Stepan Mnatsakanian
- Alexander Sahinian
