= Alexander Sahinian =

Armenian architectural historian (1910–1982)

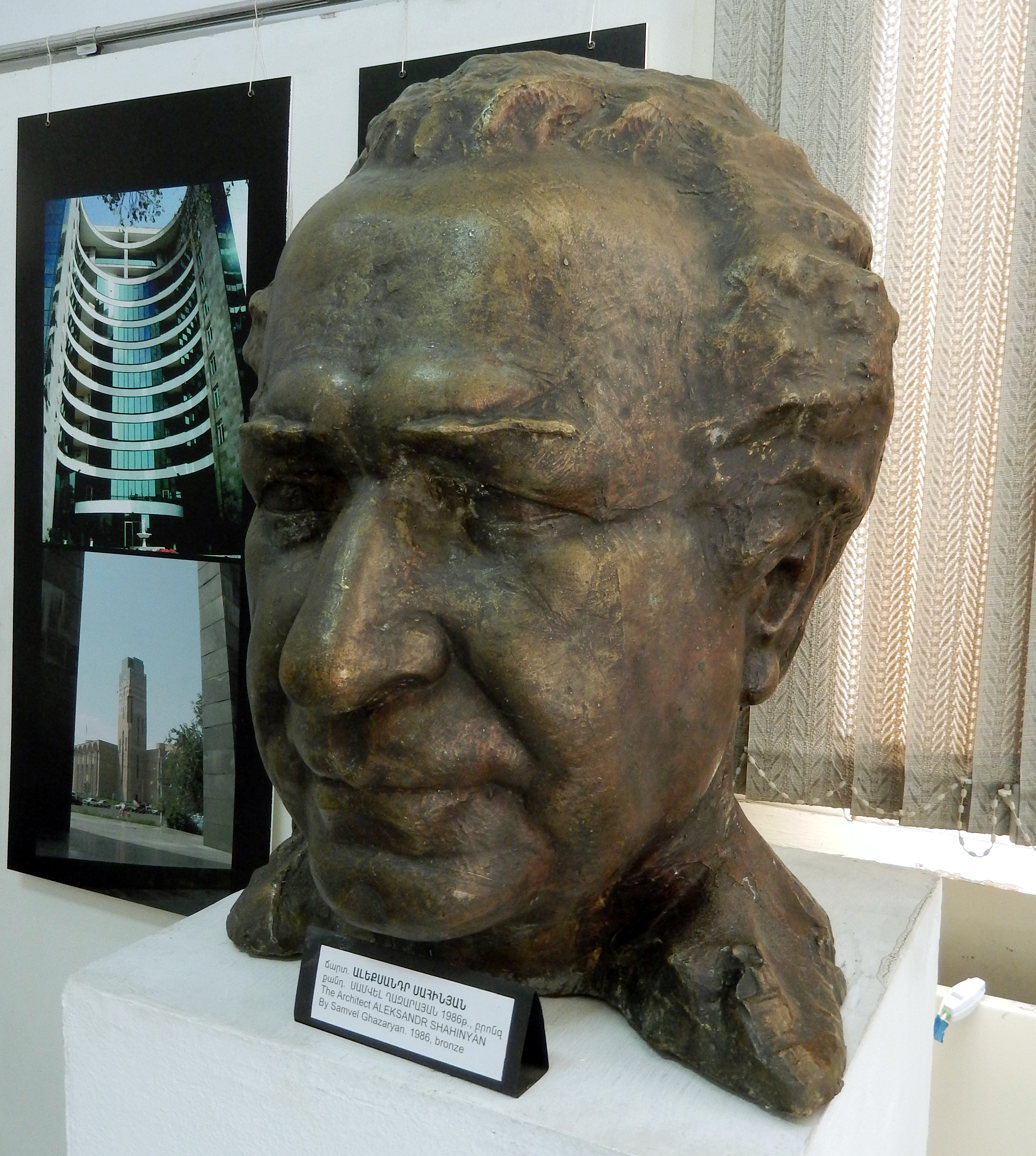
The sculptural representation of Alexander Arami Sahinyan

Alexander Arami Sahinyan (Armenian: Ալեքսանդր Արամի Սահինյան; 15 July 1910 – 4 November 1982) was a Soviet Armenian architectural historian, who headed the Architecture Department of the Institute of Arts of the Armenian Academy of Sciences between 1958 and 1982.

Born in Vardablur village in northern Armenia, he graduated from the architecture department of the Yerevan Polytechnic Institute in 1937. He was employed by a state design institute until the eruption of World War II. Between 1942 and 1944, he served in the Soviet Army and returned to Armenia wounded. Upon his return, Sahinian was admitted into the postgraduate program of the Armenian Academy of Sciences and began the archaeological excavations at the Aparan (Kasakh) Basilica. Since 1946, he worked at the Art Institute of the Academy of Sciences. Sahinian defended his dissertation on the architecture of the Aparan Basilica in 1952. Sahinian directed the excavations at the Etchmiadzin Cathedral in 1955–56 and 1959 during which fragments of the original 4th-century church building and pre-Christian structures were unearthed. Between 1968 and 1974, he reassembled Armenia's only Greco-Roman colonnaded building, the Garni Temple, which had collapsed in the 17th century.

Sahinian died in Yerevan in 1982.

== See also ==
- Stepan Mnatsakanian
- Murad Hasratyan
