= John Buchan Telfer =

John Buchan Telfer (1830 – 1907) was a British Captain in the Royal Navy and a Fellow of the Society of Antiquaries of London since 1875.

He who took part in the Crimean War (1853–56) and was awarded the Baltic Medal. He also served on many naval stations abroad. He married a Russian lady, and in the 1870s resided in the Russian Empire for three years. He traveled to the Crimea and the Caucasus on two occasions. He removed a small basalt sculpture from the Garni Temple in Armenia and bequeathed it to the British Museum.

He is remembered for his two volume (I & II) account, The Crimea and Transcaucasia, published in 1876, which, The Geographical Journal said upon his death, "has a permanent value as a mine of curious information and an accurate description of Transcaucasia at that date." In 1888 Douglas Freshfield called him "one of our best recent authorities on the Caucasus."

He also authored articles for the 9th edition of the Encyclopædia Britannica.
