= Morus Hasratyan =

Soviet-Armenian historian and philologist (1902–1979)

- Born: Morus Margar Hasratyan; September 10, 1903; Akhlatyan village, Syunik region, Armenia
- Died: February 25, 1979 (aged 75)
- Education: Yerevan State University
- Occupations: Historian, philologist
- Organization: National History Museum
- Children: Murad Hasratyan

Morus (Margar) Stepani Hasratyan (Armenian: Մորուս Հասրաթյան, September 10, 1902 – February 25, 1979) was a Soviet Armenian historian and philologist. He was the director of the History Museum of Armenia from 1964 to 1975. He wrote on a wide range of topics from Armenian history, archeology, architecture and philology. He is the father of architectural historian Murad Hasratyan.

== Biography ==
Morus Hasratyan was born on September 10, 1902, in the village of Akhlatyan, now located in the Syunik Province of Armenia. He received his primary education in parish schools in the villages of Akhlatyan and Lor, then continued his studies at Baku Trade College. During his student years, he became a follower of Stepan Shahumyan, Sergo Orjonikidze and other Bolshevik revolutionaries. Between 1918 and 1920 he participated in the Baku commune, revolutionary and inter ethnic movements of the north Caucasus. After returning to his birthplace in 1920, he actively took part in the revolutionary movements in Zangezur. He was pursued by Dashnaks on multiple occasions.

In 1922–1924, he studied at the history-philological department of Yerevan State University, where he attended lectures by Manuk Abeghyan, Hrachia Adjarian, Hakob Manandyan, Leo and others. In 1925–1927, he was assigned by the Communist Party to establish Komsomol organizations in the districts of Sisian, Goris and Dilijan. In 1930, he graduated from the university and was sent to Leningrad to continue studies as a postgraduate.

During these years, under the leadership of Nicholas Marr and Joseph Orbeli, he became deeply involved in Armenology and studied the achievements of Russian science and culture.

He died on February 25, 1979 (aged 75).

== Career ==
After completing his postgraduate studies, he returned to Yerevan in 1932. In 1933–1935 he was the deputy director in the History and Material Culture Institute. In 1934–1936 he was the director of the Museum of the Revolution.

He compiled and published documents and collections of memoirs, and a single volume memoir of the May revolution of Suren Spandaryan. In 1937 he was appointed director of Matenadaran, and in 1964–75 director of National History Museum of Armenia. He lectured in the institutes of Yerevan. In 1965–1966 he lectured at Haigazian University in Beirut, Lebanon.

Research works by Morus Hasratyan in 1940 were on architecture, archeology, philology, and the history of ancient and medieval centuries of Armenian nation.

In 1940–1941 he worked in the Monuments preservation committee and took part in the architectural and archaeological research and renovation of Avan a famous sixth century cathedral.

In 1942–1946 he worked in the Institute of Literature, engaged with philology issues. He also worked as a scientific secretary in the Social Sciences of the newly established National Academy of Sciences of Armenia. In 1947, Hasratyan was an employee of Institute of History in the National Academy of Sciences and worked there for ten years. In 1950 he participated in the archeological works of Garni, at the same time he led the archeological excavations of Zangezur.

In 1947 Hasratyan studied ancient monuments of Armenia. He explored the Tsitsernavank three dimensional basilica, and revealed its pivotal role in the design of Armenian architecture.

In the field of the history of Armenian architecture, the results of his long-term works were summarized in the book Armenian Monuments from Prehistorical Period to 17th Century, published in 1975 in Beirut, written by V. Harutyunyan (in Armenian, French and English language).

From 1964–1975 he was the director of the History Museum of Armenia. During these years the museum received international recognition. Armenian Culture was presented at Paris, Kraków, Budapest, Talin exhibitions.

Contacts were established with Armenian Diasporan Centers.

With donations from the Diasporan Armenians the collections in the museum were complemented by unique samples of applied art from different historical-ethnographic regions of Armenia.

Hasratyan was the first author of the school textbook the History of Armenian People. He authored a number of works on Armenian history, archeology, architecture and philology.

He participated in the establishment of collective works on historiography.

He translated Sayat Nova's non-Armenian songs into Armenian, composed, edited and published Sayat Nova's collection of works with the annotations (1963).
