= Hetanism =

Armenian Neopaganism

The arevakhach is a symbol used by the Arordiners.

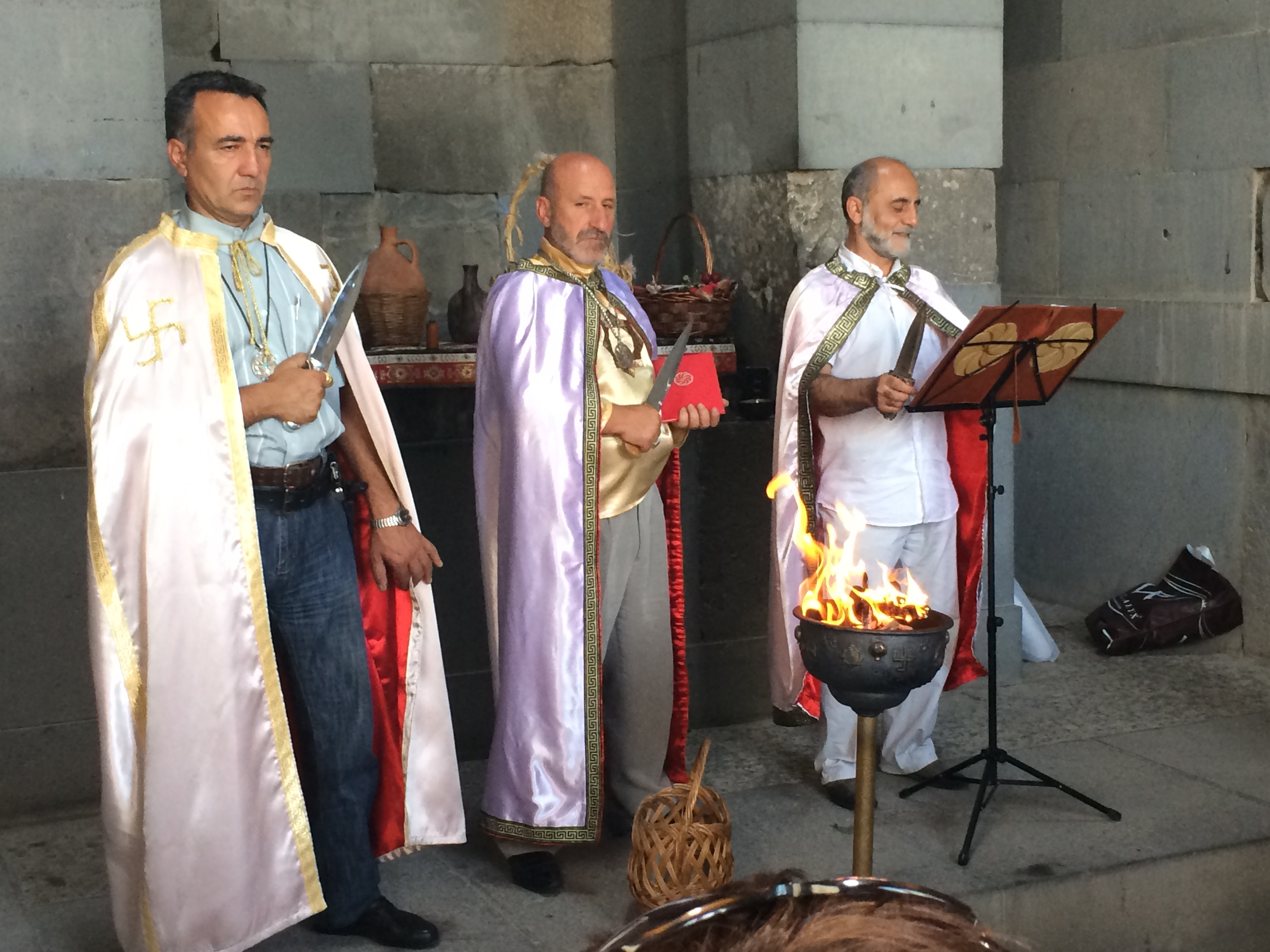
Arordiner priests officiating a ceremony at the Temple of Garni.

The Armenian Native Faith, also termed Armenian Neopaganism or Hetanism (Armenian: Հեթանոսութիւն, romanized: Hetanosutiwn; possibly a cognate word of "Heathenism"), is a modern Pagan new religious movement that harkens back to the historical, pre-Christian belief systems and ethnic religions of the Armenians. The followers of the movement call themselves "Hetans" (հեթանոս, Hetanos, 'heathen'; thus, "ethnic", a loan word from then Greek ἔθνος, ethnos) or Arordi ('children of Ari'), which also rendered as "Arordiners" in some scholarly publications.

The Arordiner movement has antecedents in the early 20th century, with the doctrine of Tseghakron (Ցեղակրոն, 'national religion') of the nationalist political theorist Garegin Nzhdeh. It took an institutional form in 1991, just after the collapse of the Soviet Union in a climate of national reawakening, when the Armenologist Slak Kakosyan founded the Order of the Children of Ari (Arordineri Ukht). Neopaganism expert Victor Schnirelmann estimated the following of Armenian neopaganism to be "no more than a few hundred people" in 2004.

== History ==
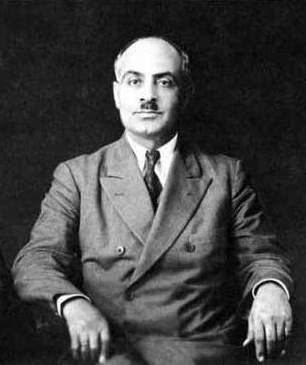
Garegin Nzhdeh

=== Nzhdeh's and Kakosyan's experiences ===
The first organisation of Armenian Native Faith, the "Order of the Children of Ari" (or "Ara"; Arordineri Ukht in Armenian) was established in 1991 by the armenologist Slak (Eduard, or Edik) Kakosyan (1936–2005). He belonged to a generation of Armenian dissidents and was exiled in the 1970s from Soviet Armenia; in 1979 he fled to the United States where he became familiar with the ideas of Garegin Nzhdeh (1886–1955).

Nzhdeh was a philosopher, statesman and fedayi of the first half of the twentieth century, who left an enduring legacy in the history of Armenia, and is still one of the driving forces of Armenian nationalism. Kakosyan praised him as the "prophet of the Armenians". Nzhdeh founded a movement named Tseghakron ("religion of the nation"), which was among the core doctrines of the Armenian Youth Federation. In Nzhdeh's poetic mythology, the Armenian nation is identified as Atlas upholding the ordered world, and it makes reference to Hayk, the mythical patriarch of the Armenians, and to Vahagn, the solar and warrior god "fighter of the serpent", as means through which to awaken the Armenian nation and raise its spirit. Nzhdeh's movement took place in the aftermath of the Armenian genocide of 1915.

During his exile, Slak Kakosyan made extensive use of Nzhdeh's works to codify the Ukhtagirk ("Book of Vows"), the sacred text of the Armenian Native Faith movement. In the book, Garegin Nzhdeh is deified as an incarnation of Vahagn, the re-establisher of the true faith of the Armenians and of the Aryan values. While still in the United States, Kakosyan claimed that he had been initiated to the ancient Armenian hereditary priesthood mentioned by Moses of Chorene, changing his forename from "Edik" to "Slak". He likely became acquainted with Zoroastrian communities in the United States.

=== 1990s: Establishment of the Children of Ari ===
Returning to Armenia in 1991, Slak Kakosyan gathered a community and founded the Children of Ari. They began to hold rituals on traditional Armenian holydays. The Temple of Garni became the centre of the community, a council of priests was set up in order to manage the organisation and the rites. During the 1990s, the group reached visibility in wider Armenian society. According to the scholar Yulia Antonyan, the emergence of the Armenian Native Faith is attributable to the same causes which led to the rise of other modern Pagan movements, but also Hindu and Protestant movements, in the other post-Soviet countries: The Armenian Native Faith represents the indigenous answer to the social and cultural upheavals which followed the collapse of Soviet society and of its atheist and materialist ideology.

=== Republican Party support and grassroots spread ===
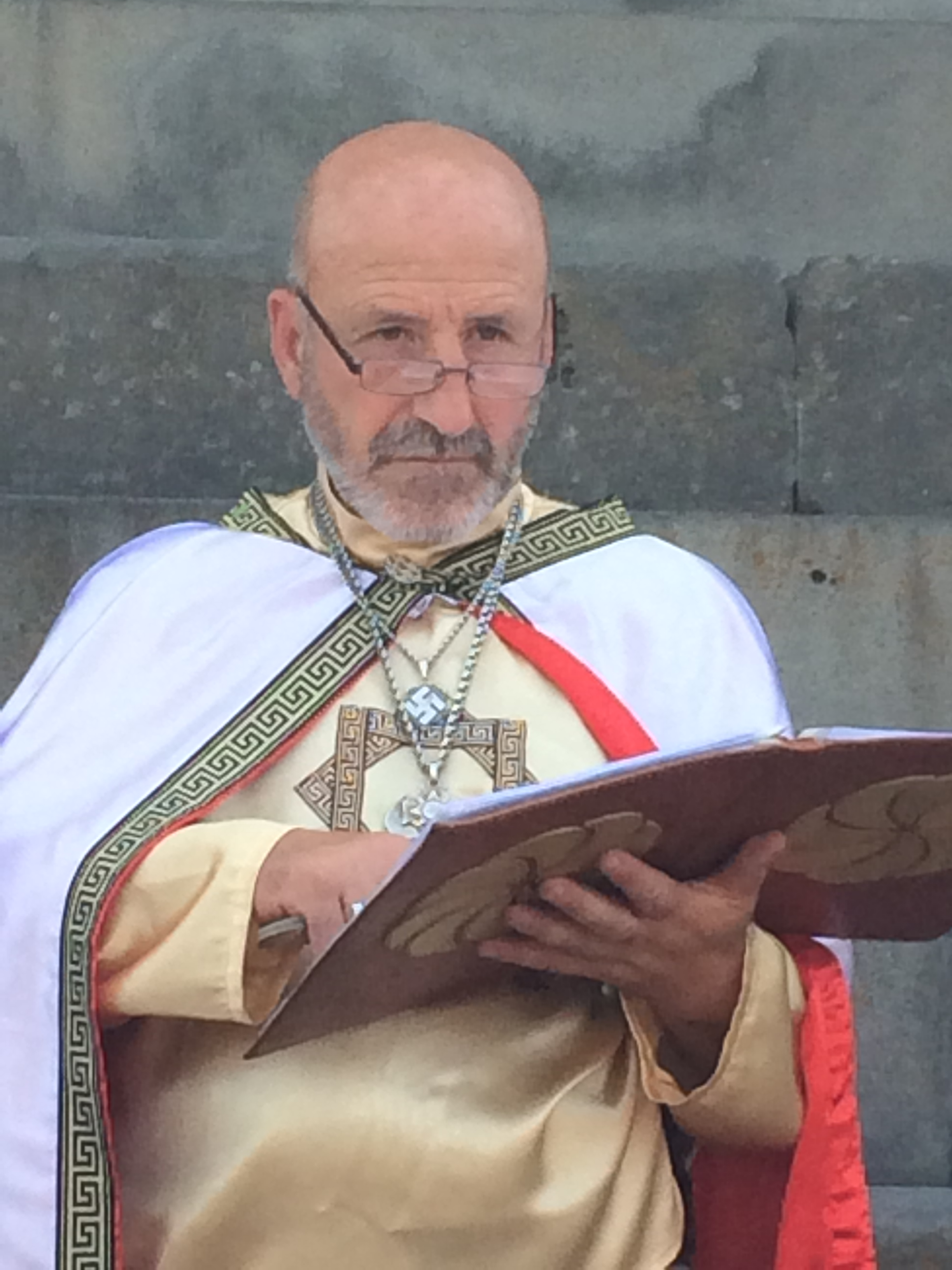
An Arordiner priest.

Ashot Navasardyan (1950–1997) and Andranik Margaryan (1949–2007), founding fathers of the Republican Party of Armenia, were Arordiners like many other members of the party and took part in the very first ritual at the Temple of Garni. The Republican Party provided financial support for the Children of Ari until recent times, sponsored the publication of Ukhtagirk and the set up of a memorial stele to Slak Kakosyan on the grounds of the Temple of Garni. Arordiner festivals are celebrated in some regions with the support of local municipalities. Despite this strong link with the nationalist political scene, the Children of Ari does not declare a political orientation, and the priests are forbidden from joining any political party.

Although it started among the Armenian intellectual elites as a means to reawaken Armenian identity, in most recent times the Armenian Native Faith movement has expanded its contingent of adherents among the provincial and rural populations, and among the Armenian diaspora. Besides the philosophical approach of the intellectuals, the common people are driven to the Armenian Native Faith by various reasons, ranging from mysticism to a sentimental devotion to the gods. Antonyan documented the case of a thirty-five years-old woman who believed to be infertile, and who joined the Armenian Native Faith movement after she allegedly became pregnant by praying to Anahit, goddess of fertility, and to Astghik, goddess of love and beauty. The woman gave her daughter the name "Nana", another name of the goddess of fertility.

Local Arordiner communities have been organised in villages outside the capital Yerevan. The structure of the Order of the Children of Ari, and of the local communities themselves, is characterised by a clear hierarchy, with the council of priests, led by an elected chief, handling the organisation of all activities. The highest position within the hierarchy is that of the supreme priest, which has remained vacant since Slak Kakosyan's death in 2005.

=== 2009: Avetisyan and the Armenian Aryan Order ===
Another party that was closely associated to the Arordiners is the Union of Armenian Aryans, led by Armen Avetisyan, headquartered in Abovyan, a city which is the second most important center of the Armenian Native Faith movement after Yerevan. The relations with the party, known for its extreme views, were cut in 2009 when Avetisyan proclaimed himself a spiritual leader and announced the initiative to build a central temple in Yerevan; as the Children of Ari expressed their opposition to the project, Avetisyan founded a separate religious group, the Armenian Aryan Order.

== Beliefs ==
=== Theology and cosmology ===
==== Ar and Ara ====
Beliefs among the individual Arordiners vary, though there is a common theological underpinning provided by Ukhtagirk. This theology is a monism: The beginning of the first section of the book recites that "in the beginning was the Ar, and Ara was the creator". The Ar is the impersonal, without qualities, transcendent principle begetting the universe, while Ara is his personal, present form as "the Creator". The book continues telling the myth of how Ara generates the gods and how the goddess Anahit gives birth to Ari (Aryan), the form of mankind. According to Arordiner theology, Ar is the life-giving word root, and it is the origin of words like, for instance, art ("arable", "cultivation"; culture, art), aryyun ("blood"), argand ("womb"), armat ("root"), arka ("king"), ara ("male"), Arev (the Sun), Ara (manifested Ar), Ari (acting with Ar), Chari (opposing Ar). The "essence of things" and their "perfection" is represented by swastika motifs.

==== Ari and Chari, and the many deities ====
The different deities are conceived by the supreme Ara. Some Arordiners do not consider them to be separate beings, but as "incarnations of different aspects of Ara". They are organised in a cosmic duality, representing the "light side" and the "dark side" of the universal power, with the latter led by Vishap, the great snake, who is identified as being the same as Yahweh. The history of mankind itself is seen as a constant struggle between these two forces: One represented by Ari (Aryans), the right men of the creative light side; the other one represented by Chari, destructive dark-sided creatures made from soil by Vishap.

The Armenian Native Faith is polytheistic in practice. The gods of the Arordiners include: Aramazd, the chief of the gods, Hayk, the mythical founder of the Armenian nation, Aray the god of war, Barsamin the god of sky and weather, Aralez the god of the dead, Anahit the goddess of fertility and war, Mihr the solar god, Astghik the goddess of love and beauty, Nuneh the goddess of wisdom, Tir the god of art and inspiration, Tsovinar the goddess of waters, Amanor the god of hospitality, Spandaramet the goddess of death, and Gissaneh the mother goddess of nature.

=== Afterlife and eschatology ===
The Arordiners have a cyclical view of reality, and they believe in the reincarnation of individual souls through the genetic lineage. That is to say, men are believed to come back to life in the following generations of their own descendants, in the kin which they begot while living. According to Arordiner doctrines, the entire world goes through similar cycles, from the smaller ones represented by the days and the years, to the greatest ones represented by eras of ten thousand years.

The struggle between light and dark forces unfolds through the cycle of each era: Order and connection with the ancestors prevail during the world's summer and spring; while disorder, confusion and forsaking of the ancestral roots prevail during the world's autumn and winter. In the latter period, beings are not in harmony with Ara, they are not nourished by cosmic energy, and they fall prey of the evil Chari forces. At the darkest stage of history, though, which according to Arordiners corresponds to the current times, Vahagn manifests again and brings the Ari forces back to life.

=== The Ukhtagirk ===
Ukhtagirk, the holy book of the Armenian Native Faith, may be translated as "Book of Vows". It was the life work of Slak Kakosyan, who finished the manuscript just before his death in 2005. Kakosyan, however, is not credited as the "author" of the Ukhtagirk, but rather as the "recorder" of an eternal truth understood by inspiration, its "compiler" (kazmogh). The book was officially proclaimed the holy text of the Order of the Children of Ari in 2000, a couple of years before its completion, when the religious organisation was officially registered by the Armenian state.

The book is divided into seven parts: Astvatsashoonch ("Dictionary"), which explains the Armenian language as a mystical system of symbols related to the root Ar; Tsagumnaran ("Genesis"), which explains in mythical terms the origin of the world, the gods and mankind; Avetaran ("Book of Testaments") and Dzonaran ("Book of Odes"), which deal with philosophical and ontological categories to explain reality and values; Veharan ("Book of Greatness") and Patgamaran ("Book of Commandments"), which present mythologised descriptions of Nzhdeh's life and ideas, respectively; and Hymnergaran ("Book of Hymns"), which is a collection of poems written by Kakosyan and his followers, as well as by authors of the nineteenth and early twentieth century. The mythological parts about creation rely upon Armenian medieval sources and folk knowledge.

Chanting ritual texts from the book is considered to procure mystical experiences, and the physical book itself is crucial for some ritual activities, such as wedding ceremonies, in which the rings are passed to the bride and groom on top of a copy of the Ukhtagirk. At the same time, Arordiners do not consider their book unquestionable, but the text is open to corrections as required by changing circumstances, according to Kakosyan, who conceived the book in the terms of a changeful and adaptable truth.

== Practices ==
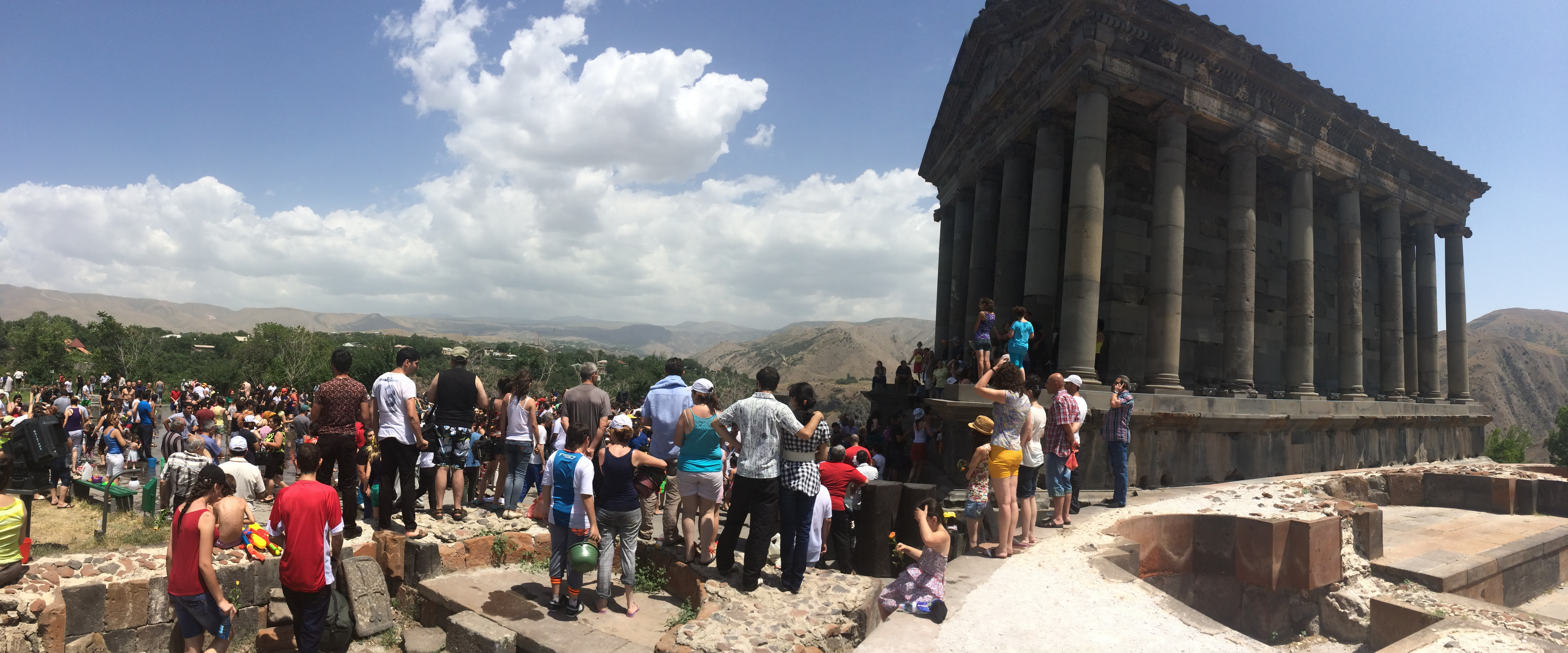
People gathered on the occasion of a public ceremony at the Temple of Garni.

Armenian Native Faith practices, rituals and representations mostly rely on the instructions given by the Ukhtagirk. For instance, it is common for the priests to make pilgrimage to Mount Khustup, where, according to the book, Garegin Nzhdeh experienced the presence of the god Vahagn. The priests' aim is to replicate such experience. The veneration of Nzhdeh and the pilgrimage to his burial site, which is located on the slopes of the Khustup, is also slowly developing within the larger community of Arordiners. In general, mountains are revered as holy, so, besides Khustup, other mountains, including Mount Ararat and Mount Aragats, function as pilgrimage destination for Arordiners.

The memory of Slak Kakosyan is also part of the cults celebrated by the Arordiner priests. The celebrations in honour of Vahagn at the Temple of Garni usually start at the memorial monument of Kakosyan, set up after his death on the site where his ashes were dispersed. The figure of Kakosyan has been mythologised in a collection of poems composed by Aren Haykyan and published in 2007. In these poems he is described as a divine man. Haykyan is also the author of poems devoted to Nzhdeh and to the gods.

=== Rituals ===
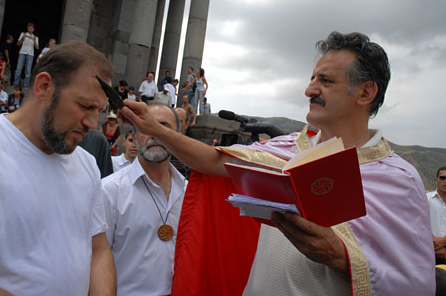
Stage of a knunk ritual.

Armenian Native Faith rituals include the yearly ceremonies performed on Armenian traditional holidays, and three rites of passage: The knunk, a complex ritual of initiation; the psak, that is wedding; and death rituals. The death rituals require the cremation of the body, and its return to the four elements. Fire is symbolised by the cremation itself; then the ashes are divided into three parts, of which one is buried in the earth, one is scattered in the air of the Garni Gorge, and the third one is poured in the water of the Garni River. Afterwards, the deceased is memorialised by the collective lighting of a torch. The first Arordiner to be cremated was Kakosyan himself, at a time when cremation was illegal in Armenia. Later, Arordiners obtained by the state the right to cremate their dead.

The Armenian term knunk may be translated as "conversion" or "reversion" (to the native way of life). Yulia Antonyan observed that about ten to twenty people take part to each knunk ritual, which is held on the occasion of the public ceremonies at the Temple of Garni. At the same time, there are many Arordiners who believe that in order to worship the native gods of Armenia it is not necessary to undergo an official conversion.

=== Temples and idols ===
Arordiner public ceremonies and rituals are held at ancient sacred places, which are often in ruins. The re-appropriation of churches that were built on native sacred sites is also common. The most important of these sites is the first-century Temple of Garni, a temple which was rebuilt in 1975, which has become the main ceremonial center for the Armenian Native Faith movement.

The Arordiners have reconsecrated the temple to Vahagn, although historically it was dedicated to Mihr. They have also been given approval for the rearrangement of the compound, in order for it to match the ideal structure of ancient Armenian sanctuaries. They have added a holy spring dedicated to Slak Kakosyan and a wood of apricot trees, the holy tree of Armenian Native Faith. The temple is now organised into three sacred spaces: The first is the sacred spring, the second one is the temple proper, and the third one is the holy wood, located on a hillock. The rituals at the Temple of Garni take place following a route which starts from the spring, passes through the temple, and endly reaches the holy wood. Downhill, each newly established local Arordiner community plants a tree, symbolising the unity and well-being of the group itself. These holy trees are adorned with ribbons and handkerchiefs symbolising one's requests to the gods.

Besides the Temple of Garni, other sites considered holy by the Arordiners and used for their rituals include the Metsamor Castle (third millennium BCE), considered a site for the cult of the mother goddess, the Erebuni Fortress (eighth century BCE), Shengavit (fourth to second millennium BCE) and Zorats Karer (third millennium BCE), and the mountains. Sculptures representing the gods which have been realised within the context of modern Armenian Native Faith are inspired by both historical specimens and the creativity of modern artists.

=== Holidays ===
The Arordiners celebrate a number of holidays: Terendez, Zatik, Hambardzum, Vardavar, and Khaghoghorhnek. To these holy days they add a holy day for the remembrance of ancestors (20 September), the Birth of Vahagn (21 March), the Birth of Mihr (22 December), and the Navasard, the New Year celebrated in August.

== Relations with Christianity ==
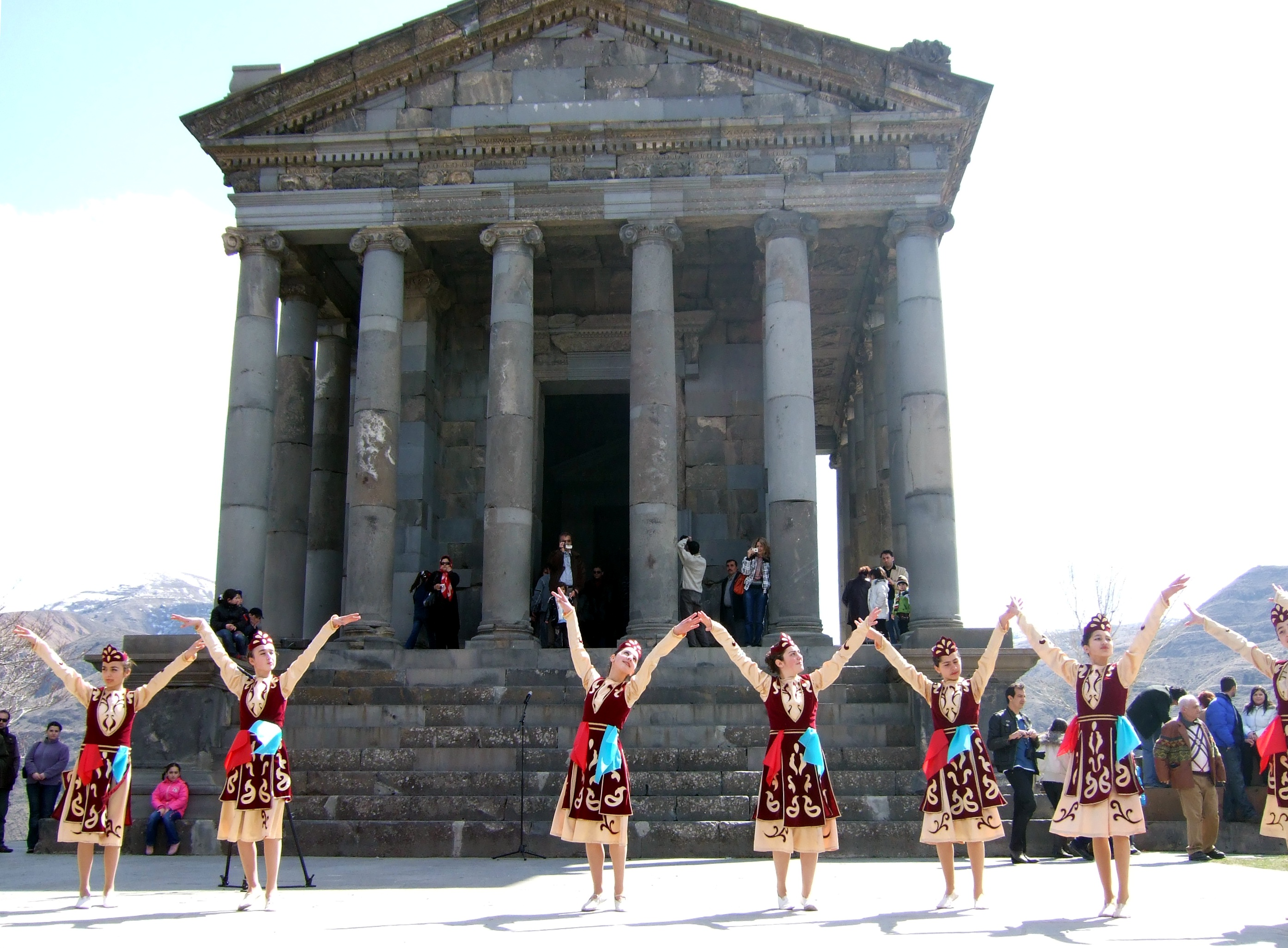
A ritual dance at the Temple of Garni.

Hetanism has many Apostolic Christian members. The Armenian Apostolic Church generally sees Arordiners as allies. A high-ranking spokesman of the Armenian Apostolic Church said:

The Armenian Church has an unequivocal stance on sectarians (i.e. Protestants et al.), but we do not interfere into pagan affairs.

The head of an Armenian institution catering to ex-cult members said:

The Armenian nation must remember its pre-Christian past, and Ara's Children help them remember. They also support the Armenian Apostolic Church in its fight against destructive sects.

Armenian Native Faith believers' attitude towards Christianity oscillates between two positions: The critique of the religion's role in Armenian history, and the conditional acceptance of the Armenian Apostolic Church as a national institution. Christianity is criticised for having destroyed the rich and highly developed ancient Armenian culture, replacing the values of courage, martial spirit and honour with those of humility, obedience and modesty, thus causing the collapse of Armenian statehood and condemning the nation to centuries of subordination to foreign powers, migrations, persecutions and massacres. According to the strongest accusations, Christianity is responsible for the "first genocide of the Armenians", which coincided with its forceful introduction in the fourth century.

At the same time, the Armenian Apostolic Church is considered an institution peculiar to the Armenian nation, and the fruit of a synthesis of Christian and indigenous elements, in which the former represent just the surface. The Arordiners see this in the church's prayers devoted to the sun and light, in church festivals overlapping indigenous Armenian festivals, and in matagh, a Christian tradition of killing an animal to eat for festal reasons and give to the poor. The Arordiners also believe that the Armenian alphabet, which church historiography says was invented by the Mesrop Mashtots, is actually an elaboration of ancient Armenian symbolism based on the motif of the swastika.

Arordiners generally do not have problems visiting Armenian churches and treating them as holy places, since many were built on the sites of pre-Christian temples. Some figures of the history of the Armenian Apostolic Church are revered as Arordiners in disguise: The catholicoi (highest-ranking bishops) Vazgen I (1954–1994) and Garegin I (1995–1999). Vasgen supported Nzhdeh and on his tombstone, instead of a cross, he has a letter of the Armenian alphabet which is considered a variant of the swastika and symbolic of seven Armenian gods. Garegin is said to have visited Garni while terminally ill, to have walked alone to the temple.

== See also ==
- Religion in Armenia
