= Natalie Kampen =

American art historian (1944–2012)

- Born: Natalie Boymel; February 1, 1944; Philadelphia, Pennsylvania
- Died: August 12, 2012 (aged 68); Wakefield, Rhode Island
- Occupations: Art historian Feminist studies

Natalie Kampen (February 1, 1944 – August 12, 2012) was an American art historian and women's studies professor.

She was born Natalie Boymel on February 1, 1944 in Philadelphia to Pauline (née Friedman) and Jules Boymel. She received her bachelor's and master's degrees from the University of Pennsylvania in 1965 and 1967, respectively. She went on to attend Brown University, receiving her PhD in 1976. Her thesis analyzed depictions of Roman working women in second and third century reliefs from Ostia Antica. Boymel taught at the University of Rhode Island from 1969 to 1988. She taught women's studies and art history at Barnard College.

Kampen was a patron of Hera Gallery, a feminist artist cooperative in Wakefield, Rhode Island.

She was honored as Woman of the Year by the Association for Professional and Academic Women in 1988.

She died in Wakefield, Rhode Island.

== Selected works ==
- Kampen, Natalie Boymel; Grossman, Elizabeth Greenwell (1983). Feminism and methodology: Dynamics of change in the history of art and architecture. Wellesley, MA: Wellesley College, Center for Research on Women. OCLC 10593656.
- ——— (1996). Bergmann, Bettina Ann (ed.). Sexuality in Ancient Art: Near East, Egypt, Greece, and Italy. Cambridge: Cambridge University Press. ISBN 978-0-521-47683-6.
- ———; Molholt, Rebecca M.; Marlowe, Elizabeth (2002). What is a Man?: Changing images of masculinity in late antique art; Douglas F. Cooley Memorial Art Gallery, Reed College, Portland, Oregon, April 12 through June 17, 2002. Seattle, Wash.: University of Washington Press. ISBN 978-0-295-98269-4.
- ——— (2009). Family Fictions in Roman Art. Cambridge: Cambridge University Press. ISBN 978-0-521-58447-0.
