= Kamilla Trever =

Russian historian (1892–1974)

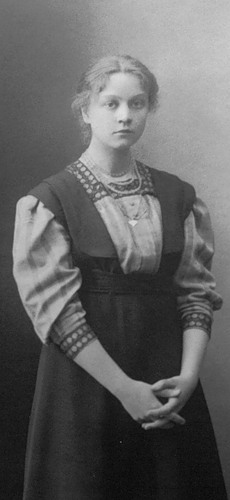
Kamilla Trever

Kamilla Vasilyevna Trever (Russian: Камилла Васильевна Тревер; 25 January 1892, Saint Petersburg – 11 November 1974, Leningrad) was a Russian historian, numismatist and orientalist, and a corresponding member of the Russian Academy of Sciences since 29 September 1943. Trever specialized in the history and culture of Transcaucasia, Central Asia and Iran.

== Career ==
Trever's career began in 1918 when she was elected as a research fellow at the Imperial Archaeological Commission, which led her to begin work at the Hermitage. This first stage of her career saw her focus on Sassanian numismatics, as well as publishing material from excavations in Mongolia. She also taught in the Iranian Studies faculty of Leningrad State University.

During the 1930s, the focus of her research moved to Hellenistic Bactria and she published a major monograph: «Памятники греко-бактрийского искусства» [Monuments of Greco-Bactrian Art].

During the Second World War, she packed up collections at the Hermitage and was then seconded to work in Uzbekistan, where she worked at the Institute of Language, Literature, and History for two years. Following that posting she was sent to the Armenian branch of the Academy of Sciences, which led to a third major period of research examining the archaeology of the South Caucasus, which resulted in two monographs: Armenia (1953); Caucasian Albania (1959).
