= Zhores Khachatryan =

Armenian archaeologist (1935–2017)

Zhores Khachatryan (Armenian: Ժորես Խաչատրյան; 1935–2017) was an Armenian archaeologist. Born in Yerevan in 1935 to a family of Armenian genocide survivors from Sivas (Sebastia), Khachatryan studied history at Yerevan State University. He began his long career at the Institute of Archaeology and Ethnography of the Armenian Academy of Sciences in 1959, initially as a research assistant. In 1962–65, he was a postgraduate student at the institute. His advisor was Babken Arakelyan. He worked at the institute until 2015. Khachatryan was a longtime head of the Department of Archaeology of Ancient Armenia at the institute.

He was a leading Armenian archeologist whose research and excavations spanned from the Yervandid (Orontid) and Artaxiad periods at Armavir, Artashat (Artaxata), Tigranakert of Artsakh, Azat Valley. He headed the excavation group of Artashat.

He was awarded the Movses Khorenatsi Medal in 2013.
