= Aleksandr Mongait =

Soviet archaeologist (1915–1974)

Aleksandr Lvovich Mongait, Russian: Александр Львович Монгайт (1915—1974) was a Soviet Russian archaeologist. His most important achievement was Археология Западной Европы, a fundamental work on prehistoric archaeology of Europe in 2 volumes which made the achievements of Western archaeology available to the Soviet general public. In the early 1960s Boris Rybakov, the informal leader of the Soviet archaeological school, organized a campaign against Mongait, blaming him for "non-patriotic views". Nevertheless, this campaign quickly failed due to reluctance of many archaeologists to participate.

In his book Archaeology in the USSR published in 1959 Mongait made reference to Victor Petrov, who at that time had a reputation of a Ukrainian nationalist kidnapped from Germany by Soviet secret services. Ironically, this reference helped emigrants understand that Petrov in fact was alive and cooperated with KGB, as any reference to defectors was impossible in Soviet publications before perestroika.

== Selected works ==
- Mongait, A.L., Archaeology in the USSR. Foreign Languages Publishing House, 1959; 2nd edition, translated and adapted by M. W. Thompson, Baltimore-Maryland, 1961.
- Монгайт, Александр Львович. Археология Западной Европы. Каменный век. М. 1973
- Монгайт, Александр Львович. Археология Западной Европы. Бронзовый и железный век. М. 1974.
- Монгайт, Александр Львович, Амальрик, Алексей Сергеевич. В поисках исчезнувших цивилизаций. М. 2005 (несколько изданий).
