= Stepan Mnatsakanian =

Stepan Mnatsakanian (Armenian: Ստեփան Մնացականյան; 1917–1994) was a Soviet Armenian architect. He headed the Architecture Department of the Institute of Arts of the Armenian Academy of Sciences between 1983 and 1988.

== See also ==
- Alexander Sahinian
- Murad Hasratyan
