= Zoroastrianism in Armenia =

Zoroastrianism has been practiced in Armenia since the fifth century BC. It first reached the country during the Achaemenid and Parthian periods, when it spread to the Armenian Highlands. Prior to the Christianization of Armenia, it was a predominantly Zoroastrian land. The yazatas (deities) Mithra (Mihr) and Verethragna (Vahagn) particularly enjoyed a high degree of reverence in the country.

== Name ==
The name of Zoroaster (Zarathustra) is attested in Classical Armenian sources as Zradašt (often with the variant Zradešt). The most important of these testimonies were provided by the early Christian Armenian authors Eznik of Kolb, Elishe, and Movses Khorenatsi. Elishe also provided the adjective zradaštakan, meaning "Zoroastrian". (Note: The spelling Zradašt was generated through an older form which started with *zur-, a fact which the German Iranologist Friedrich Carl Andreas used as evidence for a Middle Persian spoken form *Zur(a)dušt. Based on this assumption, Andreas made similar conclusions regarding the Avestan form of the name. However, modern Iranologist Rüdiger Schmitt rejects Andreas's assumption and states that the older form which started with *zur- was influenced by Armenian zur ("wrong, unjust, idle"), which therefore means that "the name must have been reinterpreted in an anti-Zoroastrian sense by the Armenian Christians". Schmitt adds: "it cannot be excluded, that the (Parthian or) Middle Persian form, which the Armenians took over (Zaradušt or the like), was merely metathesized to pre-Armenian *Zuradašt.)

Mazdaism, a synonym for Zoroastrianism, is also attested in the earliest extant Armenian texts. The 5th-century Epic Histories (Buzandaran Patmutʿiwnkʿ), written in Classical Armenian, associates magi (mogkʿ, մոգք) with Mazdaism, which its anonymous author calls Mazdezn (Մազդեզն, "Mazdean faith"). (Note: This word is borrowed from Parthian *Mazdayazn and Middle Persian Māzdēsn.) In the 6th century, Elishe preferred to use the word mogutʿiwn in his texts, which undoubtedly parallels the Georgian mogobay/moguebay ("Magism", i.e. "Mazdaism, Zoroastrianism") as attested in the early Georgian hagiographies. This feature is also seen in other West Asian languages; in Syriac Christian texts, for example, Mazdaism is usually referred to as mgošūtā.

However, the Christian Armenian sources "rarely, if at all," call the pre-Christian Armenian religion "Zoroastrianism" (see the Historiography section below). Instead, they used terms such as "the religion of our forefathers" or "heathenism".

== History ==
Zoroastrianism was introduced into Armenia during the Achaemenid era, and it was bolstered during Parthian Arsacid rule. The terminology, belief and symbolism of Zoroastrianism permeated the Armenian religious mindset and lexicon.

Extant sources of the Classical period, in addition to native Armenian sources, are used for research into the Zoroastrian Armenian pantheon and the centres of worship. Sergio La Porta notes in The Oxford Dictionary of Late Antiquity that six of the eight divinities whose cultic centres were mentioned by the 5th-century Armenian historian Agathangelos "clearly represent Zoroastrian yazatas or divinities worshipped in Armenia". Aramazd (Iranian Ahura Mazda, also known as Ohrmazd) was the head of the Armenian pantheon, and the center of his cult was mainly located at Ani-Kamakh (modern Kemah) and Bagavan. The worship of Anahit (Iranian Anahita, also known as Anahid) was dominant in the area of Ekeleats (Acilisene), whereas that of Vahagn (Iranian Verethragna, also known as Wahram) was located at Ashtishat. The cult of the divinity of Mihr (Iranian Mithra) was chiefly located at Bagayarich, and it featured greatly in the Armenian religious tradition. The cult of the god Tir (Iranian Tir) had its temple located at Artashat. The Semitic goddess Nane may have also been introduced into Armenia with Parthian connections.

Strabo, in his Geographica, referred to the similarity between Iranian and Armenian religious customs.

A number of Zoroastrian fire-altars have been discovered in Christian sanctuaries in Armenia. In various parts of Armenia, Zoroastrianism lingered on for several centuries even after the official adoption of Christianity. The Arsacid dynasty of Armenia, under which Armenia eventually would become a Christian nation, were pious Zoroastrians who invoked Mithra. (Note: "The Parthian Arsacids who came to the throne of Armenia in the first century A.D. were pious Zoroastrians who invoked Mithra as the lord of covenants, as is proper. An episode which illustrates their observance of the cult is the famous journey of Tiridates to Rome in A.D. 65-66.") An episode which illustrates the Armenian Arsacids' observance of the cult is the famous journey of Tiridates I to Rome in A.D. 65–66. Tiridates I, brother of Vologases I of Parthia and founder of the Arsacid dynasty of Armenia, was a Zoroastrian magus or priest.

In 53 AD, the Parthian Arsacid dynasty came into Armenia. The king Tiridates I is thought to have done a great amount to spread Zoroastrianism in Armenia. The Arsacid kings legitimized their rule through the authority of the Zoroastrian yazata Verethragna, the god of victory. According to Armenologist James R. Russell, Zurvanism was the form of Zoroastrianism under Yazdagird II (438–457), which he promoted in Persian Armenia.

The Armenian calendar shows influences of the Zoroastrian calendar.

Russell notes that the Armenian cross incorporates influences from Armenia's Zoroastrian past: "The Armenian Cross itself is supported on tongues of flame and has at its center not the body of Christ, but a sunburst". As Zoroastrian traditions were very much integrated into Armenian spiritual and material culture, they survived the zealotry of the Sasanian priest Kartir (fl. 3rd century) and his successors, and they were ultimately incorporated into Armenian Christianity.

Nina Garsoïan argues that—although the Christianization of Armenia separated it from the Zoroastrian world it had once been part of—the Zoroastrian mythology "had sunk so deep in the Armenian popular tradition that early Armenian Christian writers were apparently forced to alter Biblical stories in order to make their evangelizing mission comprehensible to their hearers". By the second half of the 4th century, the catholicoi of the Armenian Church still officially used the title of Zoroastrian priests (mowbed) namely "Defender of the dispossessed" (Middle Persian: driγōšān jātakgōw, Armenian: ǰatagov amenayn zrkelocʿ). However, Armenia post-Christianization gradually withdrew from the Iranian spiritual tradition, and its resistance to Sasanian Zoroastrianism soon also turned into opposition against the Christian national church of the Sasanians, the Church of the East.

== Beliefs ==
Aramazd was the chief and creator god in the Armenian version of Zoroastrianism. The deity and his name were derived from the deity Ahura Mazda after the Median conquest of Armenia in the 6th century BC. Aramazd was regarded as a generous god of fertility, rain, and abundance, as well as the father of the other gods, including Anahit, Mihr, and Nane. Like Ahura Mazda, Aramazd was seen as the father of the other gods, rarely with a wife, though sometimes husband to Anahit or Spandaramet. Aramazd was the Parthian form of Ahura Mazda.

== Legacy ==
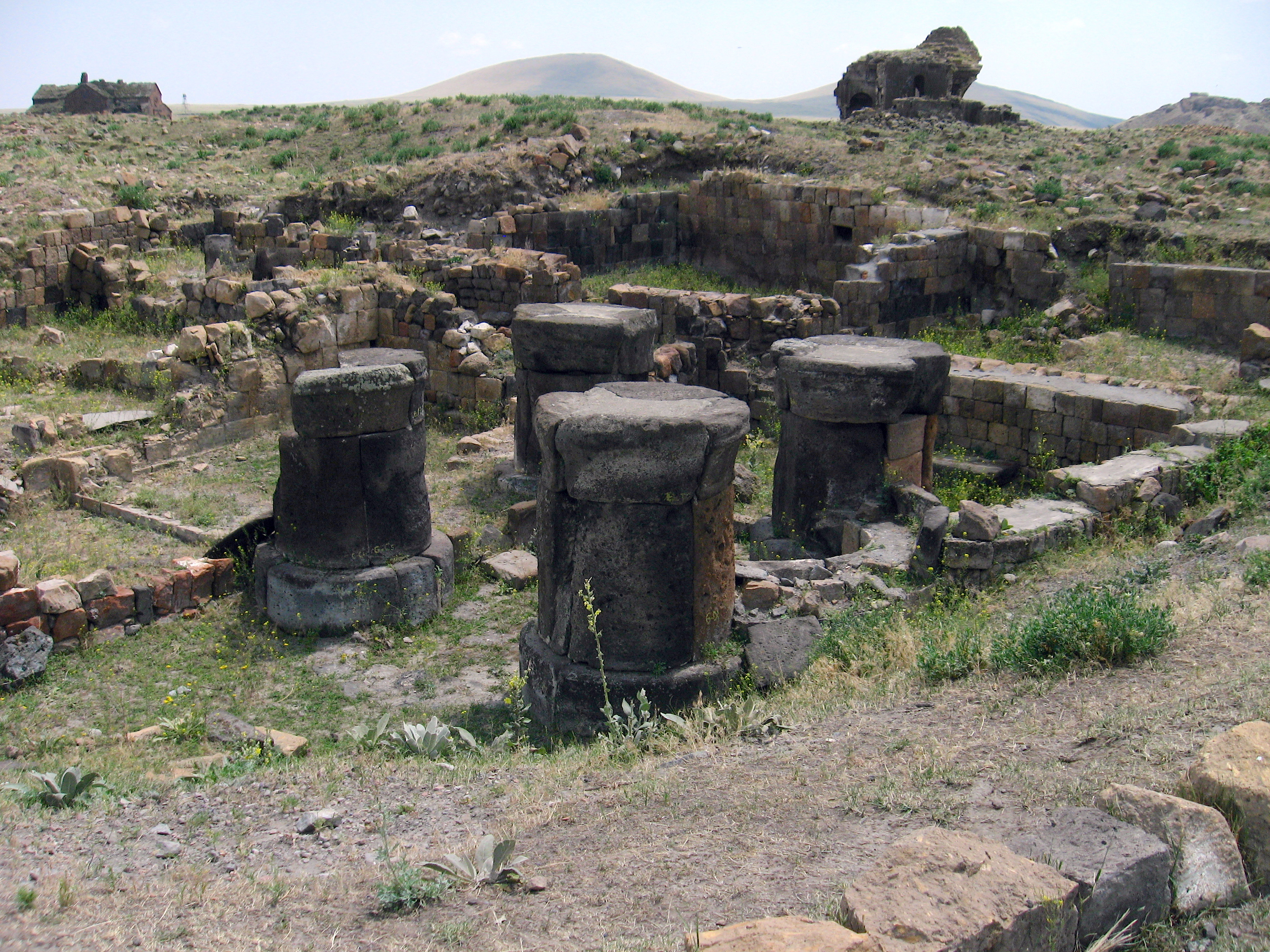
A structure in the medieval Bagratid city of Ani thought to be a Zoroastrian fire temple.

Levon Zekiyan notes that "Christian Armenia kept a deal of its pre-Christian traditions somehow re-baptising them; most of those traditions derived from the Old Iranian world or were shared in common with it. Moreover, considerable part of the Armenian Christian religious terminology is Iranian by origin." The Zoroastrian fire festival, an equivalent of Chaharshanbe Suri, survives in Armenia in the Trndez festival surrounding the Feast of the Presentation of Jesus celebrated on February 13/14. The summer water festival Vardavar, adapted by the Armenian Church as the Feast of the Transfiguration, is also of Zoroastrian origin. It corresponds to the tīregān (or āb-rīzān) festival.

The early medieval Paulician sect "may have included unconverted Armenian Zoroastrians."

=== Arewordikʿ ===
Reports indicate that there were Zoroastrian Armenians in Armenia until the 1920s. This small group of Armenian Zoroastrians that had survived through the centuries were known as the Arewordikʿ ("Children of the Sun"). They had never converted to Christianity and appear to have survived as late as the Hamidian massacres and the Armenian genocide at the turn of the 20th century. Medieval Armenian sources narrate that the Arewordikʿ were never converted by Gregory the Illuminator, the patron saint and first official head of the Armenian Apostolic Church, and that they had been "infected" by Zradasht (Zoroaster). The Arewordikʿ were specifically distinguished from Christian sects whose adherents were deemed heretics (such as the Paulicians and Tondrakians). The Arewordikʿ had seemingly taught the Paulicians and Tondrakians "to expose the dead on rooftops instead of burying them", which indicates that burial and exposure of the dead was practiced in Armenia as in Iran.

The Arewordikʿ spoke the Armenian language and, as Russell notes, revered the poplar and all heliotropic plants. Russell adds: "A tree which is either a poplar or a cypress, probably the latter, which is particularly revered by the Zoroastrians, appears on an Artaxiad coin." The Arewordikʿ Armenians offered sacrifices for the souls of the dead, and the leader of the Arewordikʿ was called the Hazarpet (cf. Iranian Hazarbed). The Arewordikʿ were known to populate five villages in the area of Mardin (present-day southeastern Turkey) in the late 14th century, Mazaka (later renamed Kayseri) and others inhabited Samosata (modern Samsat, Turkey) and Amida (modern Diyarbakır, Turkey). In the town of Marsovan (modern Merzifon, Turkey), in the early 20th century, the Armenian quarter was known as "Arewordi". Furthermore, a cemetery outside the town was known as "Arewordii gerezman", and an Armenian owner of a close by vineyard was named "Arewordean", Armenian for "Arewordi-son".

== Historiography ==
In Armenian historiography, the pre-Christian religion of Armenia is usually referred to as "paganism" or "heathenism" (het’anosut’yun). Some Armenian scholars, such as Leo and Manuk Abeghyan viewed Armenian paganism "almost identical" to Zoroastrianism, while Vrej Nersessian describes Armenia's pre-Christian religion as simply Zoroastrianism. James R. Russell argued in Zoroastrianism in Armenia (1987) that "the pre-Christian religion of the majority of the Armenians was, despite special local features, the Zoroastrian faith of the Parthian Arsacids." According to Levon Zekiyan, "As to the Zoroastrian influence, there can be no doubt at all of its capillary penetration extending till the simplest strata of the Armenian population." According to Christina Maranci, from the fourth to first centuries BC, the inhabitants of Armenia "worshipped a local pantheon of gods with parallels in the Zoroastrian religion of Iran", hence the term Hellenistic Armenia, "often used to describe this period, is potentially misleading."

Anders Hultgård noted that while little is known about the pre-Christian faith of the Armenians, "the scanty evidence which has come down to us, however, shows a thorough influence of Iranian religion." Similarly, Georges Charachidzé suggests that "the paganism of the ancient Armenians is almost entirely inaccessible to us", describing it as "a sort of local version of Zoroastrianism."

Other scholars have emphasized other elements. Tamila Mgaloblishvili and Stephen H. Rapp Jr suggested that before Christianization, Zoroastrianism in Armenia and Georgia "tended to be syncretic and adaptable with plentiful local elements." Helen C. Evans suggests that "most Armenians converting to Christianity practiced local religions, like the worship of Anahit or Zoroastrianism, the state religion of Persia, while a few venerated the classical gods of Rome."

Albert de Jong states that although the Armenians and eastern Georgians (Iberians of classical authors) were Zoroastrians prior to their conversion to Christianity, the characterization of those peoples' pre-Christian religion as Zoroastrianism has been vehemently opposed, in particular by Armenian and Georgian scholars, who, de Jong says, "prefer to think of the pre‐Christian religions of the Armenians and Georgians as chiefly 'local' or 'indigenous' traditions, which accommodated some Iranian elements". De Jong continues:

They are aided in this interpretation by the fact that the (Christian) Armenian and Georgian sources rarely, if at all, identify the religion of their ancestors before their conversion to Christianity as "Zoroastrianism." These sources either prefer seemingly neutral terms (such as "the religion of our forefathers") or polemical ones ("heathenism"), but do not label the religion as "Iranian" or "Zoroastrian." Where these terms occur, they refer to the religion of the Persians, chiefly of the Persians as enemies of the Christian Armenians. This fact in itself, while undeniable, is not compelling; on the contrary, it seems to be in harmony with the self‐identifications of most of the Iranians; the wide spread of the term "Zoroastrian" is of post‐Sasanian date and even "Mazda‐worshipping" is mainly used in limited (e.g., imperial and liturgical) contexts. Iranian Zoroastrians seem to have been identified after the Iranian land they came from (Persians, Parthians, Sogdians, etc.), with the Zoroastrian element of their identity self‐understood.

Within this matter, confusion has been created mainly due to the works of historians of Zoroastrianism, who often interpret it as an "identity" dominating all others. Furthermore, these same historians employ a very tightly restricted delineation of what is "real" Zoroastrianism. This essentialist definition only closely reflects the Sasanian version of Zoroastrianism. Many scholars, failing to recognize this fact, have resorted to using this version of the Zoroastrian religion, which is historically and culturally very specific, as a standard by which to consider the evidence for the non-Sasanian versions of Zoroastrianism. De Jong adds that this approach is not only anachronistic—for example, it measures Parthian Zoroastrianism to standards that existed only after the fall of the Parthian Empire—but also "anatopistic" in disregarding the probability of zonal developments in Zoroastrianism past the borders of the central regions of the Sasanian Empire. Both are existing problems in relation to Armenian (and Georgian) Zoroastrianism. Although the extant Zoroastrian evidence from Armenia (and Georgia) is scant and not easy to clarify, it is of major value for questioning the viability of most current methods that assess the history of Zoroastrianism.

== See also ==
- Battle of Avarayr
- Armenian mythology
- Satrapy of Armenia

== Sources ==
- Boyce, Mary (2001). Zoroastrians: Their Religious Beliefs and Practices. Psychology Press. ISBN 0415239028.
- Canepa, Matthew (2018). The Iranian Expanse: Transforming Royal Identity Through Architecture, Landscape, and the Built Environment, 550 BCE–642 CE. Oakland: University of California Press. ISBN 9780520379206.
- Ellerbrock, Uwe (2021). The Parthians: The Forgotten Empire. Oxford: Routledge. ISBN 978-0367481902.
- Frenschkowski, Marco (2015). "Christianity". In Stausberg, Michael; Vevaina, Yuhan Sohrab-Dinshaw; Tessmann, Anna (eds.). The Wiley Blackwell Companion to Zoroastrianism. John Wiley And Sons Ltd. pp. 457–477.
- Garsoïan, Nina G. (1985). Armenia Between Byzantium and the Sasanians (in French). Variorum Reprints. pp. 136–138. ISBN 978-0-86078-166-0.
- Garsoian, Nina (2004). "Armeno-Iranian relations in the pre-Islamic period". In Yarshater, Ehsan (ed.). Encyclopædia Iranica (Online ed.). Encyclopædia Iranica Foundation.
- Curtis, Vesta Sarkhosh (2016). "Ancient Iranian Motifs and Zoroastrian Iconography". In Williams, Markus; Stewart, Sarah; Hintze, Almut (eds.). The Zoroastrian Flame Exploring Religion, History and Tradition. I.B. Tauris. pp. 179–203. ISBN 9780857728159.
- De Jong, Albert (2015). "Armenian and Georgian Zoroastrianism". In Stausberg, Michael; Vevaina, Yuhan Sohrab-Dinshaw; Tessmann, Anna (eds.). The Wiley Blackwell Companion to Zoroastrianism. John Wiley And Sons Ltd. pp. 119–128.
- Hacikyan, Agop Jack; Basmajian, Gabriel; Franchuk, Edward S.; Ouzounian, Nourhan (2000). The Heritage of Armenian Literature, Volume I: From the Oral Tradition to the Golden Age. Detroit: Wayne State University Press. ISBN 0-8143-2815-6.
- Lang, David Marshall (1980). Armenia, Cradle of Civilization. Allen & Unwin.
- La Porta, Sergio (2018). "Zoroastrianism, Armenian". In Nicholson, Oliver (ed.). The Oxford Dictionary of Late Antiquity. Oxford: Oxford University Press. ISBN 978-0-19-866277-8.
- Nigosian, Solomon A. (1978). "Zoroastrianism in fifth-century Armenia". Studies in Religion/Sciences Religieuses. 7 (4): 425–434. doi:10.1177/000842987800700407.
- Panaino, Antonio; Abdollahy, Reza; Balland, Daniel (1990). "Calendars". In Yarshater, Ehsan (ed.). Encyclopædia Iranica. Vol. IV: Bāyju–Carpets XIV. London and New York: Routledge & Kegan Paul. pp. 658–677. ISBN 978-0-71009-132-1.
- Rapp, Stephen H. (2014). The Sasanian World through Georgian Eyes: Caucasia and the Iranian Commonwealth in Late Antique Georgian Literature. Routledge. ISBN 978-1472425522.
- Russell, J. R. (1986). "Armenia and Iran iii. Armenian Religion". In Yarshater, Ehsan (ed.). Encyclopædia Iranica. Encyclopaedia Iranica. Vol. II/4: Architecture IV–Armenia and Iran IV. London and New York: Routledge & Kegan Paul. pp. 438–444. ISBN 978-0-71009-104-8.
- Russell, James R. (1987). Zoroastrianism in Armenia. Harvard University, Department of Near Eastern Languages and Civilizations and National Association for Armenian Studies and Research. ISBN 978-0674968509.
- Sanasarian, Eliz (11 November 2011). "Nationalism and Religion in Contemporary Iran". In Roald, Anne Sofie; Longva, Anh Nga (eds.). Religious Minorities in the Middle East: Domination, Self-Empowerment, Accommodation. Brill. ISBN 978-9004216846.
- Schmitt, Rüdiger (2002). "Zoroaster i. The Name". In Yarshater, Ehsan (ed.). Encyclopædia Iranica (Online ed.). Encyclopædia Iranica Foundation.
- Charachidzé, Georges (1993). "The Religion and Myths of Armenia". American, African, and Old European Mythologies. Chicago: University of Chicago Press. p. 265.
- Redgate, A. E. (2000). The Armenians. Oxford: Blackwell Publishing. ISBN 9780631220374.
