= Kingdom of Armenia (antiquity) =

331 BC – 428 AD monarchy in Ancient Near East

Greater Armenia Մեծ Հայք, Mets Hayk‘
- 189 BC – 428 AD
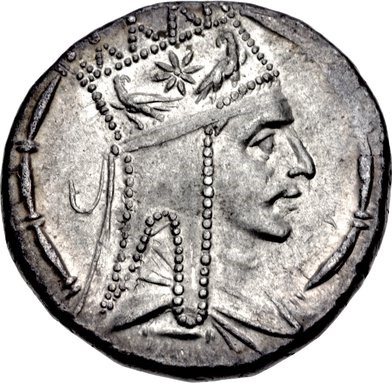
- A coin of Tigranes the Great with its distinctive Armenian tiara is the best known variety of national coinage in Greater Armenia

- Armenia at its greatest extent under Tigranes the Great in 69 BC with the core (Greater Armenia) in pale peach
- Capital: Artaxata; Tigranocerta; Vagharshapat; Dvin
- Common languages: native language: Armenian (written after c. 405) court languages: Greek, Aramaic, Iranian (Parthian and Middle Persian)
- Religion: Zoroastrianism (until c. 301 AD); Christianity (Armenian Church; after c. 301 AD)
- Government: Monarchy
- Historical era: Antiquity, Hellenistic
  - Satrapy of Armenia is formed: c. 533 BC
  - Orontid autonomy: 331 BC
  - Reign of Artaxias I begins: 189 BC
  - Artaxiad dynasty ends: 12 AD
  - Reign of Tiridates I begins: 54 AD
  - Christianization: 301 AD
  - Partition of Armenia: 387 AD
  - Last Arsacid king of Armenia deposed: 428 AD

Area
- c. 70 BC: 900,000 km^{2} (350,000 sq mi)
- c. 300 AD: 311,000 km^{2} (120,000 sq mi)

Population
  - c. 70 BC: 10,000,000
  - c. 300 AD: 4,000,000
- Currency: Talent
Preceded by	Succeeded by
Satrapy of Armenia	Byzantine Armenia; Persian Armenia

The Kingdom of Greater Armenia (Armenian: Մեծ Հայք, Mets Hayk‘) was a kingdom in the Ancient Near East from 189 BC to 428 AD, starting with the reign of Artaxias I and ending with the abolition of the Arsacid dynasty by the Sasanians.

The origins of the kingdom lay in the Satrapy of Armenia of the Achaemenid Empire, which was formed from the territory of Urartu (860–590 BC) after it was conquered by the Medes in 590 BC. The satrapy became autonomous after 331 under the Orontid dynasty after the conquests of Alexander the Great, which was then incorporated as one of the Hellenistic kingdoms of the Seleucid Empire.

Under the Seleucid Empire (312–63 BC), the Armenian throne was divided in two—Greater Armenia and Sophene—both of which passed to members of the Artaxiad dynasty in 189 BC. During the Roman Republic's eastern expansion, the Kingdom of Armenia, under Tigranes the Great, reached its peak, from 83 to 69 BC, after it reincorporated Sophene and conquered the remaining territories of the falling Seleucid Empire, effectively ending its existence and raising Armenia into an empire for a brief period, until it was itself conquered by Rome in 69 BC. The remaining Artaxiad kings ruled as clients of Rome until they were overthrown in 12 AD due to their possible allegiance to Rome's main rival in the region, Parthia.

During the Roman–Parthian Wars, the Arsacid dynasty of Armenia was founded when Tiridates I, a member of the Parthian Arsacid dynasty, was proclaimed King of Armenia in 52. Throughout most of its history during this period, Armenia was heavily contested between Rome and Parthia, and the Armenian nobility was divided among pro-Roman, pro-Parthian or neutral factions. From 114 to 118, Armenia briefly became a province of the Roman Empire under Emperor Trajan. The Kingdom of Armenia often served as a client state or vassal at the frontier of the two large empires and their successors, the Byzantine and Sassanid empires. In 301/314, Tiridates III proclaimed Christianity as the state religion of Armenia, making the Armenian kingdom the first state in history to officially embrace Christianity.

In 387, Armenia was partitioned into Byzantine Armenia and Persian Armenia. The last Arsacid king of Armenia was deposed in 428, ending independent Armenian statehood until the emergence of Bagratid Armenia in the 9th century.

== History ==
=== Origins ===
Prior to the 9th century BC, the geographic region known as the Armenian Highlands was inhabited by Proto-Armenian and other tribes which did not yet constitute a unitary state or nation. The first state to rule over a significant part of the Armenian Highlands was the Kingdom of Urartu, also known as the Kingdom of Van or Ararat and called Biainili in the Urartian language used by its rulers. The kingdom competed with Assyria over supremacy in the highlands of Ararat and the Fertile Crescent.

Both kingdoms fell to Iranian invaders from the east (the Medes, followed by the Achaemenid Persians) in the 6th century BC. Its territory was reorganized into a satrapy called Armenia. The Orontid dynasty ruled as satraps of the Achaemenid Empire for three centuries until the empire was defeated by Alexander the Great's Macedonian Empire at the Battle of Gaugamela in 331 BC. After Alexander's death in 323 BC, a Macedonian general named Neoptolemus obtained Armenia until he died in 321 BC and the Orontids returned, not as satraps, but as kings.

=== Orontid dynasty ===
Orontes III and the ruler of Lesser Armenia, Mithridates, recognized themselves independent, thus elevating the former Armenian satrapy into a kingdom, giving birth to the kingdoms of Armenia and Lesser Armenia. Orontes III also defeated the Thessalian commander Menon, who wanted to capture Sper's gold mines.

Weakened by the Seleucid Empire which succeeded the Macedonian Empire, the last Orontid king, Orontes IV, was overthrown in 201/200 BC and the kingdom was taken over by a commander of the Seleucid Empire, Artaxias (Artashes) I, who is presumed to have been related to the Orontid dynasty himself.

=== Artaxiad dynasty ===
Tigran II's Armenian Empire, superimposed on a contemporary map of the region

Map of Armenia and the Roman client states in eastern Asia Minor, ca. 50 AD, before the Roman–Parthian War and the annexation of the client kingdoms into the Empire

The Seleucid Empire's influence over Armenia had weakened after it was defeated by the Romans in the Battle of Magnesia in 190 BC. A Hellenistic Armenian state was thus founded in the same year by Artaxias I alongside the Armenian kingdom of Sophene led by Zariadres. Artaxias seized Yervandashat, united the Armenian Highlands at the expense of neighboring tribes and founded the new royal capital of Artaxata near the Araxes River. According to Strabo and Plutarch, Hannibal received hospitality at the Armenian court of Artaxias I. The authors add an apocryphal story of how Hannibal planned and supervised the building of Artaxata. The new city was laid on a strategic position at the juncture of trade routes that connected the Ancient Greek world with Bactria, India and the Black Sea which permitted the Armenians to prosper. Tigranes the Great saw an opportunity for expansion in the constant civil strife to the south. In 83 BC, at the invitation of one of the factions in the interminable civil wars, he entered Syria, and soon established himself as ruler of Syria—putting the Seleucid Empire virtually at an end—and ruled peacefully for 17 years. During the zenith of his rule, Tigranes the Great extended Armenia's territory outside of the Armenian Highland over parts of the Caucasus and the area that is now south-eastern Turkey, Iran, Syria and Lebanon, becoming one of the most powerful states in the Roman East.

=== Roman rule ===
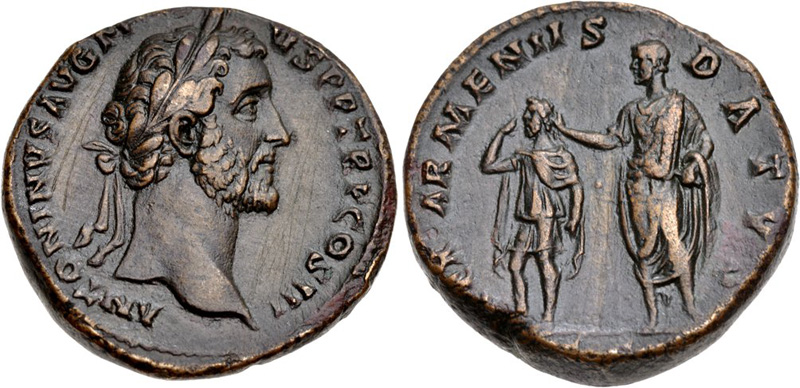
Roman coin of 141 AD, showing emperor Antoninus Pius holding a crown on the Armenia King's head

Armenia became a Roman client kingdom in 66 BC, after the final defeat of Armenia's ally, Mithridates VI of Pontus by Pompey at the Battle of the Lycus.

Mark Antony invaded and defeated the kingdom in 34 BC, but the Romans lost hegemony during the Final War of the Roman Republic in 32–30 BC. In 20 BC, Augustus negotiated a truce with the Parthians, making Armenia a buffer zone between the two major powers.

Augustus installed Tigranes V as king of Armenia in AD 6, but ruled with Erato of Armenia. The Romans then installed Mithridates of Armenia as client king. Mithridates was arrested by Caligula, but later restored by Claudius. Subsequently, Armenia was often a focus of contention between Rome and Parthia, with both major powers supporting opposing sovereigns and usurpers. The Parthians forced Armenia into submission in AD 37, but in AD 47 the Romans retook control of the kingdom. In AD 51 Armenia fell to an Iberian invasion sponsored by Parthia, led by Rhadamistus. Tigranes VI of Armenia ruled from AD 58, again installed by Roman support. The period of turmoil ends in AD 66, when Tiridates I of Armenia was crowned king of Armenia by Nero. For the remaining duration of the Armenian kingdom, Rome still considered it a client kingdom de jure, but the ruling dynasty was of Parthian extraction, and contemporary Roman writers thought that Nero had de facto yielded Armenia to the Parthians.

=== Arsacid dynasty ===
Under Nero, the Romans fought a campaign (55–63) against the Parthian Empire, which had invaded the Kingdom of Armenia, allied with the Romans. After gaining Armenia in 60, then losing it in 62, the Romans sent the Legio XV Apollinaris from Pannonia to Gnaeus Domitius Corbulo, legatus of Syria. In 63, strengthened further by the legions III Gallica, V Macedonica, X Fretensis and XXII, General Corbulo entered into the territories of Vologases I of Parthia, who then returned the Armenian kingdom to Tiridates, king Vologases I's brother. An agreement was reached at the Treaty of Rhandeia in 63, according to which members of the Parthian Arsacid dynasty would rule Armenia as client kings of Rome.

Another campaign was led by Emperor Lucius Verus in 162–165, after Vologases IV of Parthia had invaded Armenia and installed his chief general on its throne. To counter the Parthian threat, Verus set out for the east. His army won significant victories and retook the capital. Sohaemus, a Roman citizen of Armenian heritage, was installed as the new client king. But during an epidemic within the Roman forces, Parthians retook most of their lost territory in 166. Sohaemus retreated to Syria, and the Arsacid dynasty was restored to power in Armenia.

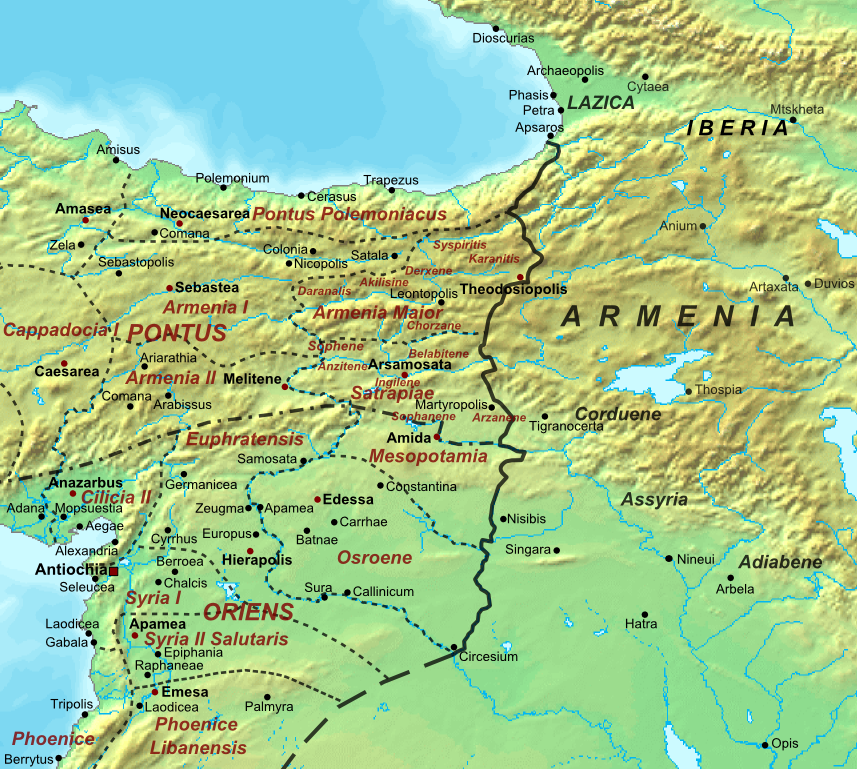
Kingdom of Armenia after the division of Armenia in 387

After the fall of the Arsacid dynasty in Persia, the succeeding Sassanid Empire aspired to reestablish Persian control. The Sassanid Persians occupied Armenia in 252. However, in 287, Tiridates III the Great was brought to power by the Roman armies. After Gregory the Illuminator's spreading of Christianity in Armenia, Tiridates accepted Christianity and made it his kingdom's official religion. The date of Armenia's conversion to Christianity is traditionally held to be 301, preceding the Roman Emperor Constantine the Great's conversion and the Edict of Milan by a dozen years. In 387, the Kingdom of Armenia was split between the Eastern Roman Empire and the Sassanid Empire. Western Armenia first became a province of the Roman Empire under the name of Armenia Minor, and later Byzantine Armenia; Eastern Armenia remained a kingdom within Persia until, in 428, the local nobility overthrew the king, and the Sassanids installed a marzban (governor) in his place, beginning the Marzpanate period over Persian Armenia. Those parts of historical Armenia remained firmly under Persian control until the Muslim conquest of Persia, while the Byzantine parts remained until being conquered, also by invading Arabic armies, in the 7th century. In 885, after years of Roman, Persian, and Arab rule, Armenia regained its independence under the Bagratuni dynasty.

== Army ==
=== Under Tigranes the Great ===
The army of the Kingdom of Armenia reached its peak under the reign of Tigranes the Great. According to the author of Judith, his army included chariots and 12,000 cavalrymen, most likely heavy cavalry or cataphracts, a unit also commonly used by Seleucids and Parthians. His army consisted mainly of 120,000 infantrymen and 12,000 mounted archers, also an important feature of the Parthian army. Like the Seleucids, the bulk of Tigranes' army were foot soldiers. The Jewish historian Josephus talks of 500,000 men in total, including camp followers. These followers consisted of camels, donkeys, and mules used for baggage, sheep, cattle, and goats for food, said to be stocked in abundance for each man, and hoards of gold and silver. As a result, the marching Armenian army was listed as "a huge, irregular force, too many to count, like locusts or the dust of the earth", not unlike many other enormous Eastern armies of the time. The smaller Cappadocian, Graeco-Phoenician, and Nabataean armies were generally no match for the sheer number of soldiers, with the organized Roman army with its legions eventually posing a much greater challenge to the Armenians.

Note that the numbers given by Israelite historians of the time were probably exaggerated, considering the fact that the Hasmonean Jews lost the war against Tigranes.

Plutarch wrote that the Armenian archers could kill from 200 meters with their deadly-accurate arrows. The Romans admired and respected the bravery and the warrior spirit of the Armenian Cavalry – the core of Tigran's Army. The Roman historian Sallustius Crispus wrote that the Armenian [Ayrudzi – lit. horsemen] Cavalry was "remarkable by the beauty of their horses and armor". Horses in Armenia, since ancient times were considered as the most important part and pride of the warrior.

=== Ayrudzi ===
Since antiquity, Kingdom of Armenia had a cavalary called "Azatavrear", which consisted mainly of elite Armenians. "Azatavrear" cavalry made up the main part of the king's court. In medieval times, the cavalry were collected from nobles (usually the youngest sons of Armenian lords), and were known as Ayrudzi, or "horsemen." During times of peace, Armenian cavalry were divided into small groups which took the roles of guarding the King and other Armenian lords, as well as their families. Some part of the Armenian cavalry force was always patrolling Armenian borders, under the command of an Armenian general (sparapet). The group of Armenian cavalry whose main mission was the protection of the Armenian king and his family consisted of 6000 heavily armored horsemen in the ancient period, and 3000 horsemen in the medieval period. During times of war, the number of Armenian cavalry would rise, with estimates ranging from 10,000 to at least 20,000 horsemen. Besides heavy cavalry, there was also light cavalry, which primarily consisted of mounted archers.

=== Legio I Armeniaca-Armenian First Legion ===
"Legio Armeniaca" translates from Latin as "Armenian Legion" and "prima" as "first". The Armenian First Legion was one of the later-period Roman imperial legions. This Legion was mentioned in the late-antique text known as Notitia Dignitatum. It is most likely that the Armenian First Legion was formed in the 2nd or 3rd century AD, in the western part of the Kingdom, with the mission to protect the lands of Armenia from intrusion. It might first have been the garrison of Armenian lands which had been under the control of the Roman Empire. The Armenian First Legion took part in the ill-fated Persian campaign of the emperor Julianus Apostata in 363.

=== Legio II Armeniaca-Armenian Second Legion ===
"Legio Armeniaca" translates from Latin as "Armenian Legion" and "Secunda" as "Second". Like the First legion, the Armenian Second Legion was one of the later-period Roman imperial legions. This legion is also mentioned in the Notitia Dignitatum. The Armenian Second Legion was thought to have been created around the end of the 3rd century or in the beginning of the 4th century. The Armenian Second Legion had a permanent camp in one of the Northern provinces of the Orient, and built a camp in Satala. The Armenian Second legion is mentioned in the year 360 AD as a part of the garrison of Bezabda (anciently called Phoencia) in upper Tigris. In Bezabde the Armenian Second Legion served together with the Legions Parthica and II Flavia. In 390 AD Bezabde was taken by the Persian army, and a terrible bloodbath ensued against the inhabitants and garrison. The legion seemed to have survived this battle, because it appears in Notitia Dignitatum, which was written in the 5th century.

Later on, the Armenian Second legion became a part of the Byzantine army.

== Mythology and pre-Christian religion ==
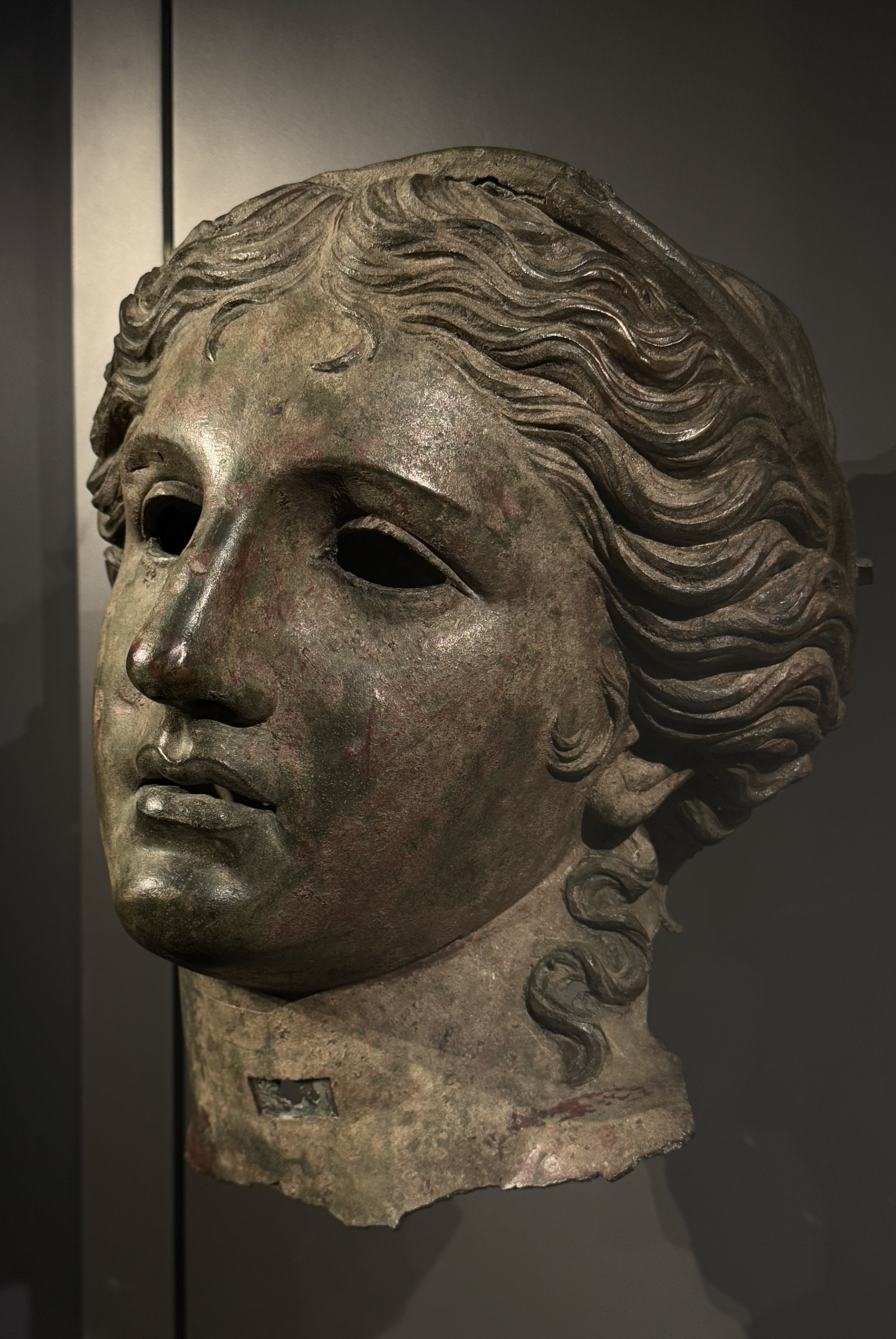
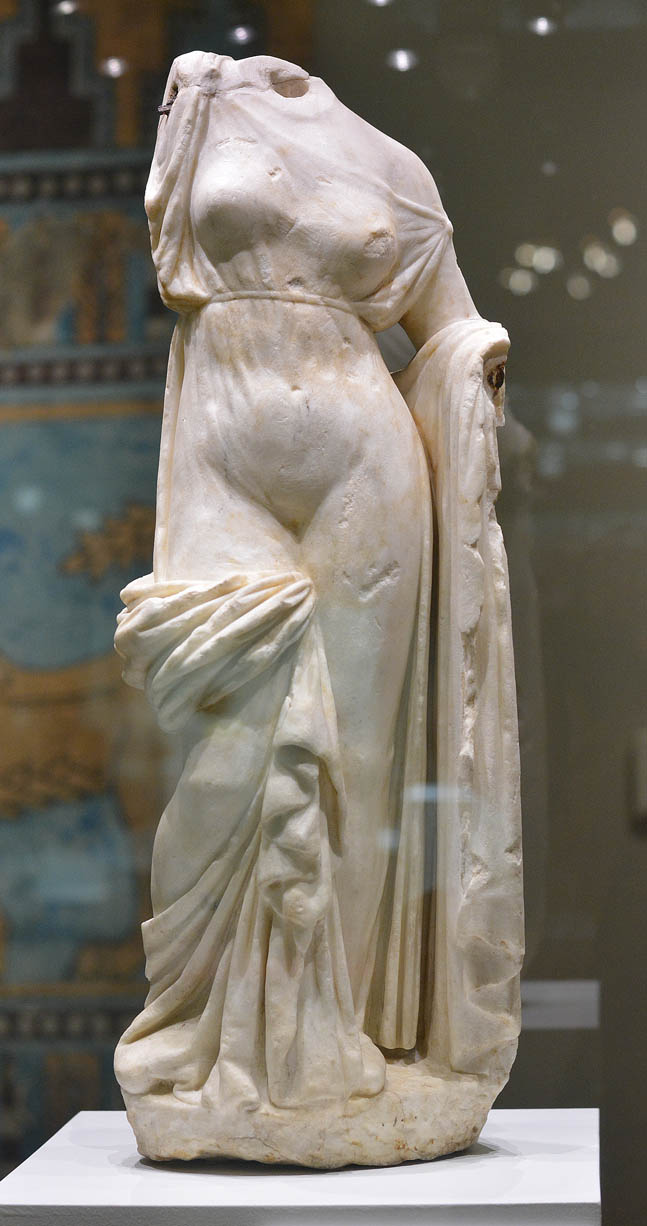
Left: Satala Aphrodites head (believed to be Anahit)
Right: Statue of Aphrodite-Astłik found from Artaxata

The pre-Christian Armenian pantheon included:

- Aramazd – Cognate of the Iranian Ahura Mazda (or Ormazd). Head of the pantheon, identified with Zeus in the interpretatio graeca.
- Amanor and/or Vanatur – God of the Armenian new year, Navasard, at the end of July. His temple was located in Diyadin.
- Anahit – Cognate of the Iranian Anahita. The goddess of fertility and birth, and daughter or wife of Aramazd, Anahit is identified with Artemis and Aphrodite. Temples dedicated to Anahit were established in Armavir, Artashat, Ashtishat.
- Ara the Beautiful – a dying-and-rising god slain in a war against Semiramis.
- Astghik – Cognate of the Semitic Ishtar. Fertility goddess and consort of Vahagn, sharing a temple with him at Derik. The holiday of Vardavar was originally in honor of Astghik.
- Barsamin – God of sky and weather, probably derived from the Semitic god Baal Shamin.
- Hayk – Legendary forefather of the Armenian people, archer, and slayer of the Titan Bel.
- Mihr – Cognate with the Persian Mithra. God of the sun and light, son of Aramazd, the brother of Anahit and Nane. His center of worship was located in Bagaharich, and the temple of Garni was dedicated to him.
- Nane – Possible cognate of the Sumerian Nanaya. Daughter of Aramazd, war and motherhood goddess. Her cult was related to Anahit, both of their temples located near each other in Gavar.
- Tir or Tiur – God of wisdom, culture, science and studies, he also was an interpreter of dreams. He was the messenger of the gods and was associated with Apollo. Tir's temple was located near Artashat.
- Tsovinar – Also called Nar, she was the goddess of rain, sea and water, though she was actually a fiery being who forced rain to fall.
- Vahagn – Cognate of the Iranian Verethragna. The storm god and herculean dragon slayer. Derik housed the central temple to Vahagn.

During the 1st century AD, Christianity spread through Armenia due to (according to legend) the efforts of the apostles Bartholomew and Thaddeus. After persecutions by kings Sanatruk, Axidares, Khosrov I, and Tiridates III, Christianity was adopted as the state religion by Tiridates III after he was converted by Gregory the Illuminator. Armenia's adoption of Christianity as the state religion (the first country to do so) distinguished it from Parthian and Mazdaen influence.

=== Zoroastrianism ===
Until the late Parthian period, Armenia was a predominantly Zoroastrian-adhering land. With the advent of Christianity, both paganism and Zoroastrianism gradually started to diminish. The founder of the Arsacid branch in Armenia, Tiridates I, was a Zoroastrian priest or magus. A noted episode which illustrates the observance by the Armenian Arsacids is the famous journey of Tiridates I to Rome in A.D. 65–66. With the adoption of Christianity in the early 4th century, Zoroastrianism's influence in the kingdom gradually started to decline.

== Literature ==
Little is known about pre-Christian Armenian literature. Many literature pieces known to us were saved and then presented to us by Moses of Chorene. This is a pagan Armenian song, telling about the birth of Vahagn:

Armenian version

Երկնէր երկին, երկնէր երկիր,
Երկնէր եւ ծովն ծիրանի,
Երկն ի ծովուն ունէր և զկարմրիկն եղեգնիկ։

Ընդ եղեգան փող ծուխ ելանէր,
Ընդ եղեգան փող բոց ելանէր,
Եւ ի բոցոյն վազէր խարտեաշ պատանեկիկ։

Նա հուր հեր ունէր,
Բոց ունէր մօրուս,
Եւ աչքունքն էին արեգակունք։

Translation

In travail were heaven and earth,
In travail, too, the purple sea,
The travail held in the sea the small red reed.

Through the hollow of the stalk came forth smoke,
Through the hollow of the stalk came forth flame,
And out of the flame a youth ran․

Fiery hair had he,
Ay, too, he had flaming beard,
And his eyes, they were as suns.

== Language ==
Before the Armenian alphabet was created, Armenians used the Aramaic and Greek alphabets, the last of which had a great influence on the Armenian alphabet.

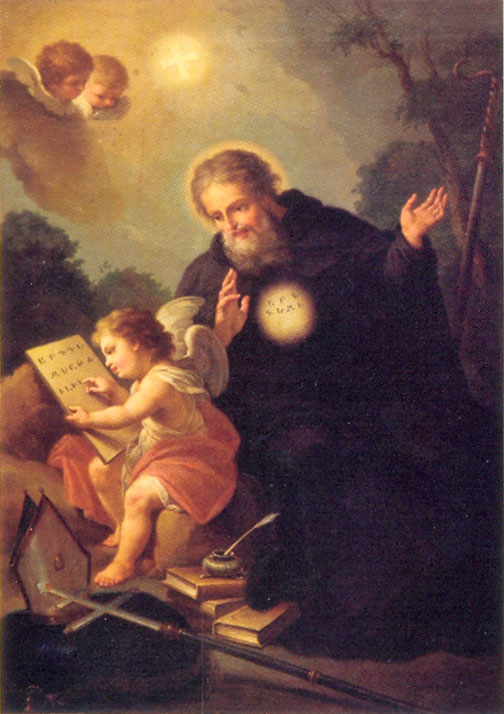
Mesrop Mashtots, creator of the Armenian alphabet, by Venetian painter Francesco Maggiotto (1750–1805)

The Armenian alphabet was created by Saint Mesrop Mashtots and Isaac of Armenia (Sahak Partev) in AD 405, primarily for a Bible translation into the Armenian language. Traditionally, the following phrase translated from Solomon's Book of Proverbs is said to be the first sentence to be written down in Armenian by Mashtots:

Ճանաչել զիմաստութիւն եւ զխրատ, իմանալ զբանս հանճարոյ:
Čanačʿel zimastutʿiun yev zxrat, imanal zbans hančaroy.
To know wisdom and instruction; to perceive the words of understanding.

— Book of Proverbs, 1:2.

By the 2nd century BC, according to Strabo, the inhabitants of Greater Armenia spoke the Armenian language, implying that modern Armenians descended from that population.

== Major cities ==
- Yervandashat – The ancient town sits upon an escarpment overlooking the junction of the Arax River and Akhurian River. According to Movses Kaghankatvatsi, Orontes IV founded Yervandashat to replace Armavir as his capital after Armavir had been left dry by a shift of the Arax. The archaeological site has not been subject of major research, but fortifications and some remains of palaces have been uncovered. Ancient Yervandashat was destroyed by the army of the Persian King Shapur II in the 360s.
- Artashat (Artaxata) – King Artashes I founded Artashat in 185 BC in the region of Ostan within the historical province of Ayrarat, at the point where the Araks river was joined by the Metsamor river during the ancient era, near the heights of Khor Virap. The story of the foundation is given by the Armenian historian Movses Khorenatsi of the 5th century: "Artashes traveled to the location of the confluence of the Eraskh and Metsamor [rivers] and taking a liking to the position of the hills (adjacent to Mount Ararat), he chose it as the location of his new city, naming it after himself." According to the accounts given by Greek historians Plutarch and Strabo, Artashat is said to have been chosen and developed on the advice of the Carthaginian general Hannibal. The city's strategic position in the Araks valley on the Silk Road soon made Artashat a centre of bustling economic activity and thriving international trade, linking Persia and Mesopotamia with the Caucasus and Asia Minor. Its economic wealth can be gauged in the numerous bathhouses, markets, workshops, and administrative buildings that sprang up during the reign of Artashes I. The city had its own treasury and customs. The amphitheatre of Artashat was built during the reign of king Artavasdes II (55–34 BC). The remains of the huge walls surrounding the city built by King Artashes I can still be found in the area. After losing its status as a capital, Artashat gradually lost its significance.
- Tigranakert was founded by the Armenian emperor Tigranes the Great in the 1st century BC. Tigranakert was founded as the new capital of the Armenian Empire in order to be in a more central position within the boundaries of the expanding empire. Its population was 120,000 and it also had many temples and an amphitheater.
- Vagharshapat – In the first half of the 1st century, during the reign of the Armenian Arshakuni king Vologases I (Vagharsh I) (117–144), the old town of Vardgesavan was renovated and renamed Vagharshapat, which still persists as the official appellation of the city. The original name, as preserved by Byzantine historian Procopius (Persian Wars), was Valashabad—"Valash/Balash city" named after king Balash/Valash/Valarsh of Armenia. The name evolved into its later form by the shift in the medial L into a Gh, which is common in Armenian language. Khorenatsi mentions that the town of Vardges was totally rebuilt and fenced by Vagharsh I, eventually becoming known as Norakaghak ('New City') or Vagharshapat. The city served as a capital for the Arshakuni Kingdom of Armenia between 120 and 330 AD and remained the country's most important city until the end of the 4th century. When Christianity became the state religion of Armenia, Vagharshapat was eventually called Ejmiatsin (or Etchmiadzin), after the name of the Mother Cathedral. Starting in 301, the city became the spiritual centre of the Armenian nation, home to the Armenian Catholicosate, one of the oldest religious organizations in the world. Vagharshapat was home to one of the oldest schools established by Saint Mashtots and the home of the first manuscripts library in Armenia founded in 480 AD. Starting in the 6th century, the city slowly lost its importance—especially after the transfer of the seat of the Catholicosate to Dvin in 452—until the foundation of the Bagratid Kingdom of Armenia in 885. After the fall of the Bagratid dynasty in 1045, the city gradually became an insignificant place until 1441, when the seat of the Armenian Catholicosate was transferred from the Cilician town of Sis back to Etchmiadzin.
- Dvin – The ancient city of Dvin was built by Khosrov III the Small in 335 on the site of an ancient settlement and fortress from the 3rd millennium BC. The palace in Dvin contained a Zoroastrian fire-temple constructed by Sasanians. Since then the city had been used as the primary residence of the Armenian kings of the Arshakuni dynasty. Dvin had a population of about 100,000 citizens of various professions including arts and crafts, trade, fishing, etc. After the fall of the Armenian Kingdom in 428, Dvin became the residence of Sassanid-appointed marzpans (governors), Byzantine kouropalates and later Umayyad and Abbasid-appointed ostikans (governors), all of whom were of senior nakharar stock. In 640 Dvin was the center of the emirate of Armenia.

== Political geography ==
The Kingdom of Armenia was bordered by Caucasian Albania in the east, Iberia in the north, the Roman Empire in the west, and Parthia, later succeeded by Sassanian Empire, in the south. The border between Iberia and the Kingdom of Armenia was the Kur River, which was also the border between Caucasian Albania and Kingdom of Armenia.

After 331 BC, Armenia was divided into Lesser Armenia (a region of the Kingdom of Pontus), the Kingdom of Armenia (corresponding to Armenia Major) and the Kingdom of Sophene. In 189 BC when Artashes I's reign began, many neighboring countries (Media, Caucasian Iberia, Seleucid Empire) exploiting the weakened state of the kingdom, conquered its remote regions. Strabo says that Artaxias I campaigned in the east and reunited Caspiane and Paytakaran, then campaigned in the north, defeated the Iberians, reuniting Gugark (Strabo also notes that Iberia recognized themselves as vassals of the Kingdom of Armenia at this time), to the west, reuniting Karin, Ekeghik and Derjan and to the south, where, after many battles with the Seleucid Empire, he reunited Tmorik. Artaxias I was not able to reunite Lesser Armenia, Corduene, and Sophene, something completed by his grandson Tigranes the Great. At its peak, under Tigranes the Great, it incorporated, besides Armenia Major, Iberia, Albania, Cappadocia, Cilicia, Armenian Mesopotamia, Osroene, Adiabene, Syria, Assyria, Commagene, Sophene, Judea and Atropatene. Parthia and also some Arab tribes were vassals of Tigranes the Great.

=== Provinces ===
Historical provinces of Greater Armenia

Traditionally, Greater Armenia was divided into 15 provinces. These provinces all existed at some point, but they never existed all at the same time. In reality, Greater Armenia comprised nearly 200 districts of varying sizes and types. The 15 provinces were as follows:

- Upper Armenia
- Sophene
- Aghdznik
- Turuberan
- Corduene
- Moxoene
- Nor Shirakan
- Vaspurakan
- Syunik
- Artsakh
- Paytakaran
- Utik
- Gugark
- Tayk
- Ayrarat

Other Armenian regions:

- Lesser Armenia (not part of the Kingdom of Armenia)
- Armenian Mesopotamia

== Maps ==
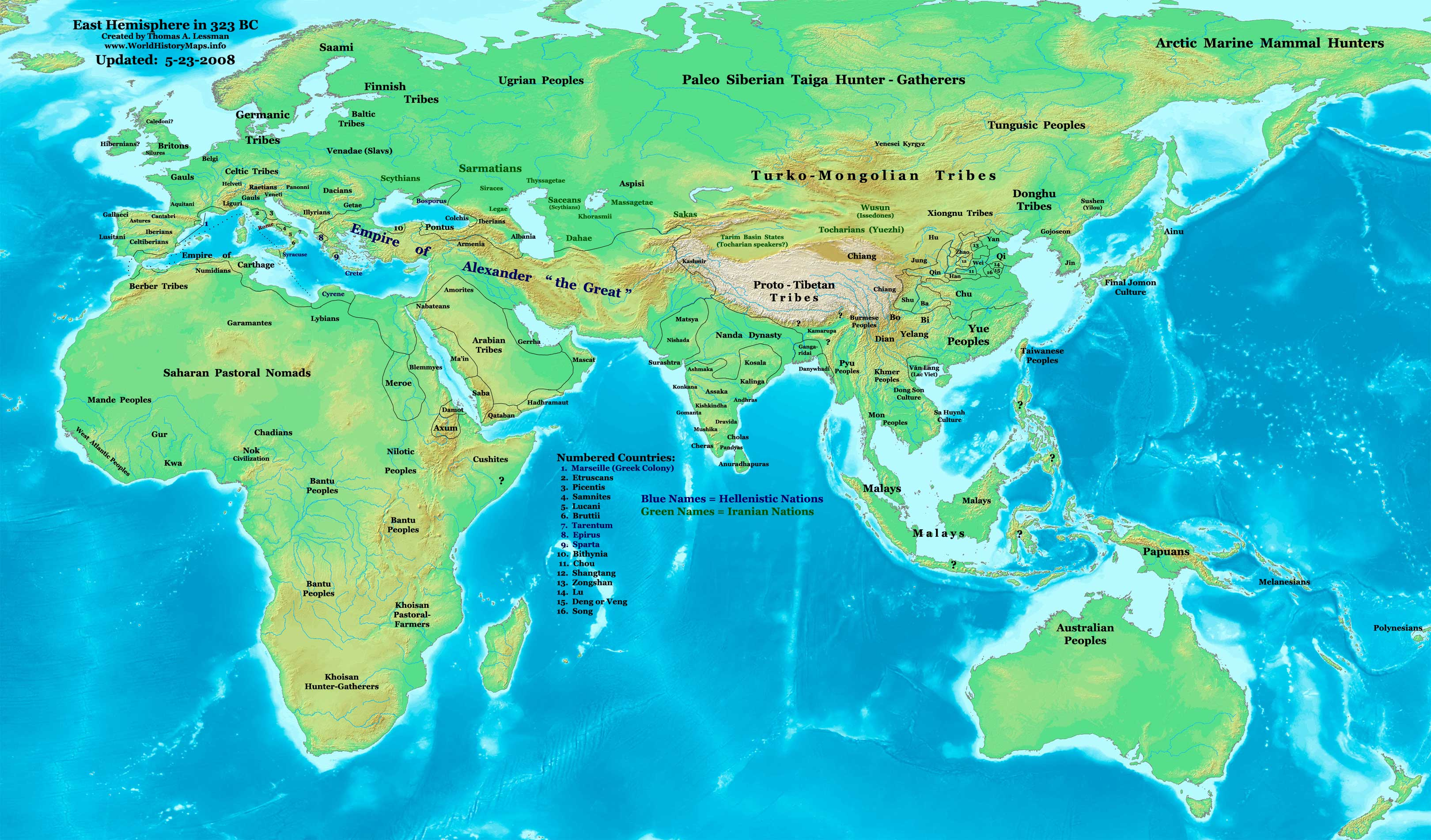
World in 323 BC

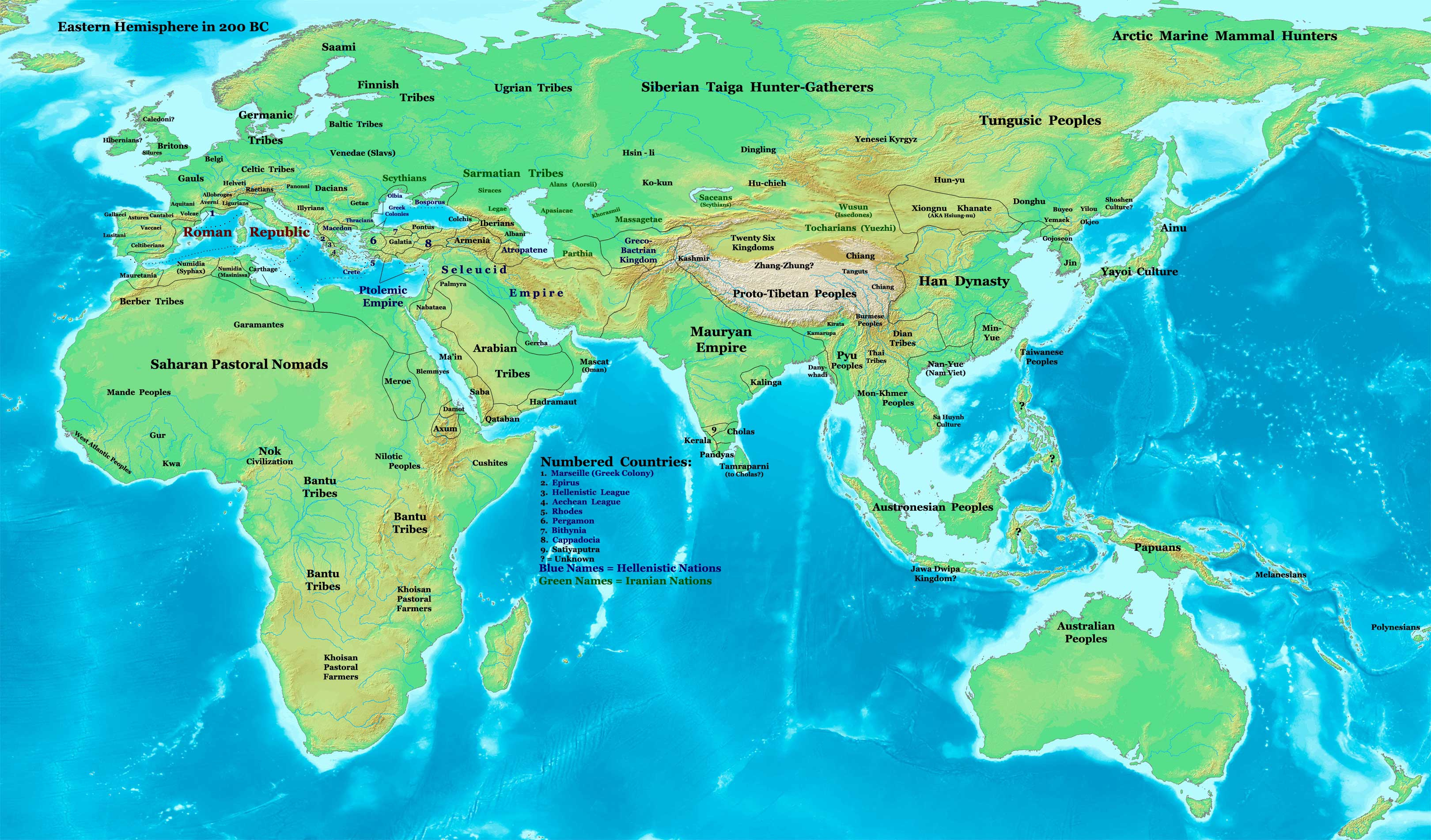
World in 200 BC

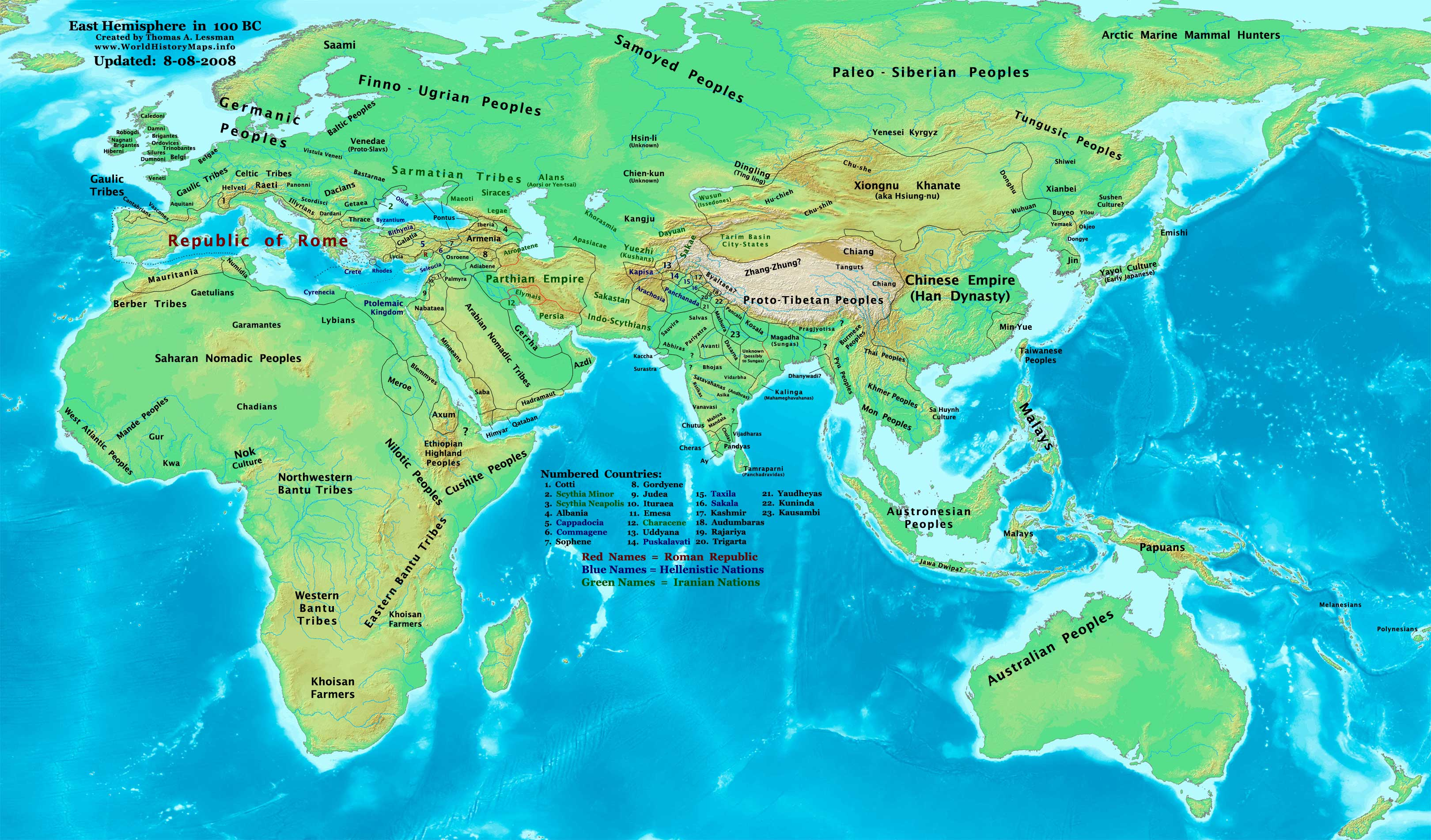
World in 100 BC

Orontid Armenia

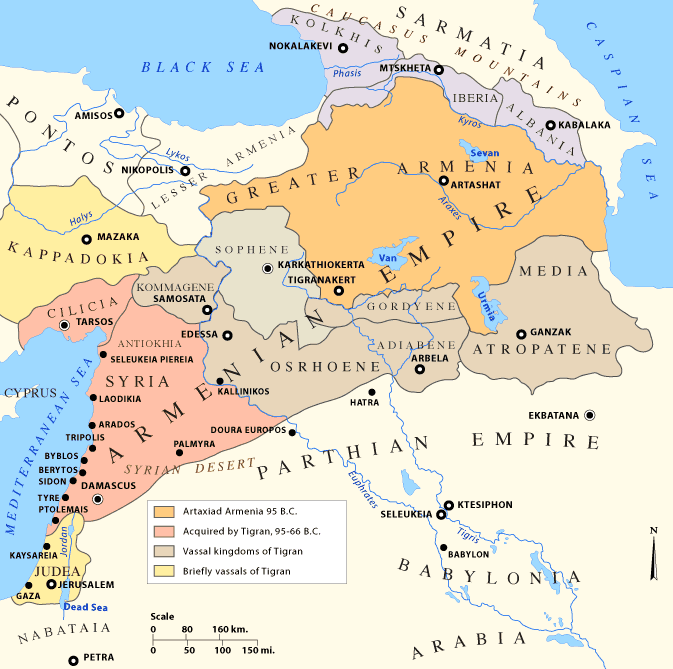
Armenian Empire under Tigranes the Great

Arshakuni Armenia in 150 AD

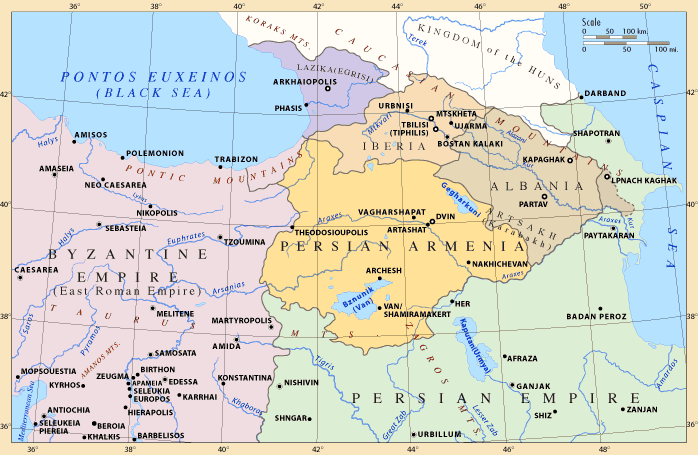
Persian Armenia

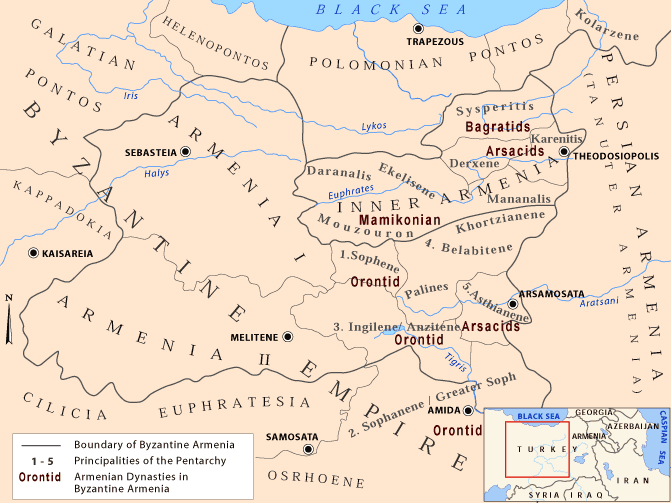
Byzantine Armenia
