= Bagavan =

St. John Church of Bagavan
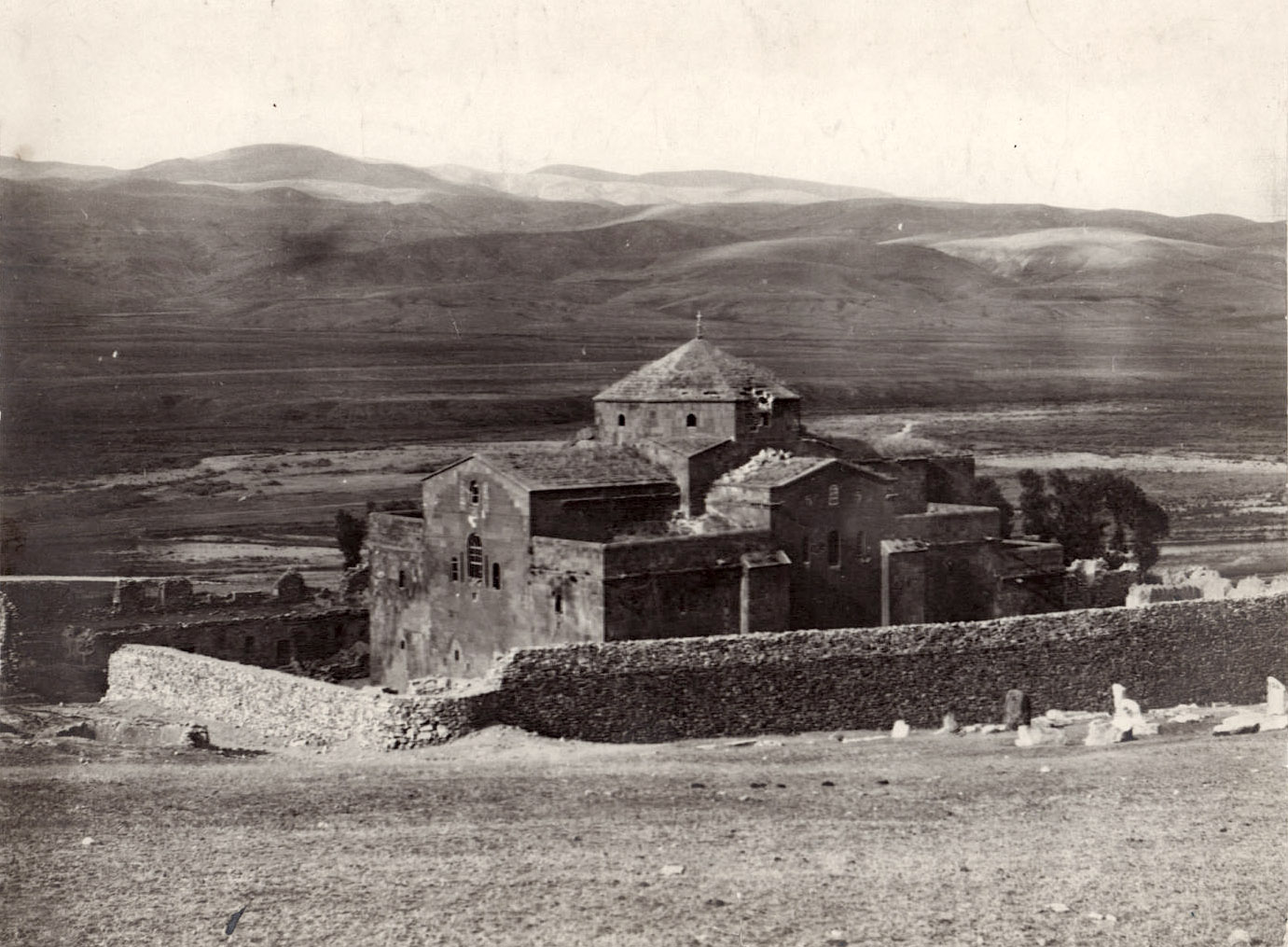
- St. John the Baptist's monastery of Bagavan, circa 1915

- Location within Turkey

Religion
- Affiliation: Armenian Apostolic Church
- Province: Ağrı Province
- Region: Armenian Highlands
- Status: Destroyed in 1915

Location
- Location: Turkey
- Coordinates: 39.6231°N 43.5252°E

Bagavan (also spelled Bagawan; Armenian: Բագաւան) was an ancient locality in the central part of Armenia in the principality of Bagrevand. The site is located in the village of Taşteker to the west of modern Diyadin, Turkey. Situated on a tributary of the Euphrates at the foothills of Mount Npat, to the north of Lake Van, Bagavan held one of the major temples of pre-Christian Armenia. (Note: "Npat" is known in Greek as Niphates and in Turkish as Tapa-seyd.) After the Christianization of Armenia, Bagavan became the site of a large church and monastery. Pillaged in 1877 by the Kurds, it was completely destroyed after 1915 during the Armenian genocide.

== Name ==
The name Bagavan literally translates as "town of the gods". The etymology was given by Agathangelos, who explained the word as being Parthian, the equivalent of Armenian dicʿ-awan. Movses Khorenatsi held it as bagnacʿn awan ("town of altars"). The name, written as *Bagauana, is recorded in Greek by Ptolemy as Sakauana. Bagavan was most likely connected with one of the Old Persian words for sanctuary, such as *bagina- or *bagastāna-.

== History ==
Bagavan was the site of one of the most important shrines of pre-Christian Armenia, and an eternal flame was kept burning there. The royal family of Armenia celebrated the New Year's festival at Bagavan, on the first day of the first month (Nawasard) of the Armenian calendar. Bagavan was also a centre for the worship of Aramazd, the Armenian version of Ahura Mazda. Movses Khorenatsi attributed the foundation of the altar at Bagavan to "the last Tigran" and the establishment of the New Year festival to King Valarsaces; however, the modern scholar Robert H. Hewsen notes that these theories were probably Movses's own inventions.

According to Agathangelos, Tiridates III of Armenia (r. 287–330) and his court were baptized by Gregory the Illuminator at Bagavan in the Euphrates. Gregory reportedly founded the monastery of St. John the Baptist at Bagavan. The Turkish name of the town, Üç Kilise ("the three churches"), derives from this monastery. The Sasanian king (shah) Yazdegerd II (r. 438–457) camped at Bagavan in 439 during his punitive campaign in Sasanian Armenia.

In 591 during the reign of emperor Maurice, Bagavan and much of Armenia came under Roman administration after the Romans aided Khosrow II in defeating the rebel Bahram Chobin at the battle of the Blarathon.

Bagavan's St. John the Baptist church was completed in 631–639 on the left bank of the Euphrates river. Hewsen notes that it was originally surrounded by a "high wall flanked with towers which protected the monasting buildings within". In 1877, it was ransacked by Kurds before being completely demolished after 1915 during the Armenian genocide.

== Sources ==
- Canepa, Matthew (2018). The Iranian Expanse: Transforming Royal Identity Through Architecture, Landscape, and the Built Environment, 550 BCE–642 CE. Oakland: University of California Press. ISBN 978-0520290037.
- Hewsen, R. H. (1988). "Bagawan (2)". In Yarshater, Ehsan (ed.). Encyclopædia Iranica. Vol. III/4: Bačča(-ye) Saqqā–Bahai Faith III. London and New York: Routledge & Kegan Paul. pp. 407–408. ISBN 978-0-71009-116-1.
- Humphreys, Mike (2018). "Bagavan (Diyadin; Uç Kilise; Tashteker)". In Nicholson, Oliver (ed.). The Oxford Dictionary of Late Antiquity. Oxford: Oxford University Press. ISBN 978-0-19-866277-8.
- La Porta, Sergio (2018). "Zoroastrianism, Armenian". In Nicholson, Oliver (ed.). The Oxford Dictionary of Late Antiquity. Oxford: Oxford University Press. ISBN 978-0-19-866277-8.
- Russell, James R. (1987). Zoroastrianism in Armenia. Harvard University Press. ISBN 978-0674968509.
