= Nanaia =

Nanaia may refer to:

- Nane (goddess), a pagan mother goddess worshipped in Armenia and close to Georgia
- Nanaia Mahuta (born 1970), a New Zealand politician
- Alexandre Nanaia, an actor in the 1999 film The Letter
- Haunuiananaia, a culture hero in Pukerua Bay, a small seaside community at the southern end of the Kapiti Coast, New Zealand
