= Armenian Cross =

Religious symbol

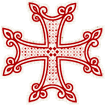
Armenian cross

An Armenian cross is a symbol that combines a cross with a floral postament or elements. The cross of Armenian Christianity is combined with the Christian cross, and this design was often used for high crosses (khachkar) – a free-standing cross made of stone and often richly decorated.

== Pre-Christian connections ==
The Armenologist James R. Russell notes that the Armenian Cross incorporates influences from Armenia's Zoroastrian past. As Zoroastrian traditions were very much integrated into Armenian spiritual and material culture, they survived the zealotry of the Sasanian priest Kartir (fl. 3rd century) and his successors, and were ultimately incorporated into Armenian Christianity. Russell adds: "The Armenian Cross itself is supported on tongues of flame and has at its center not the body of Christ, but a sunburst".

== Gallery ==
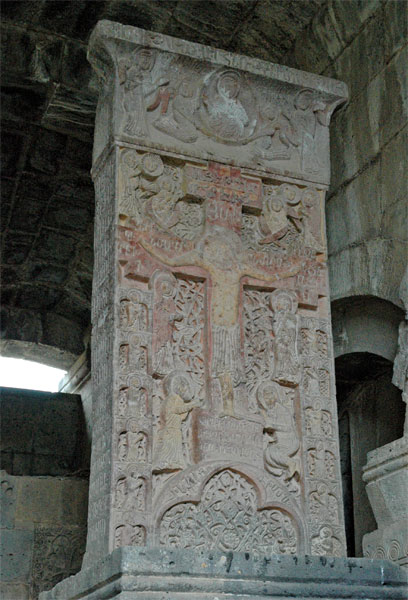
The Holy Savior khachkar in Haghpat (1273)

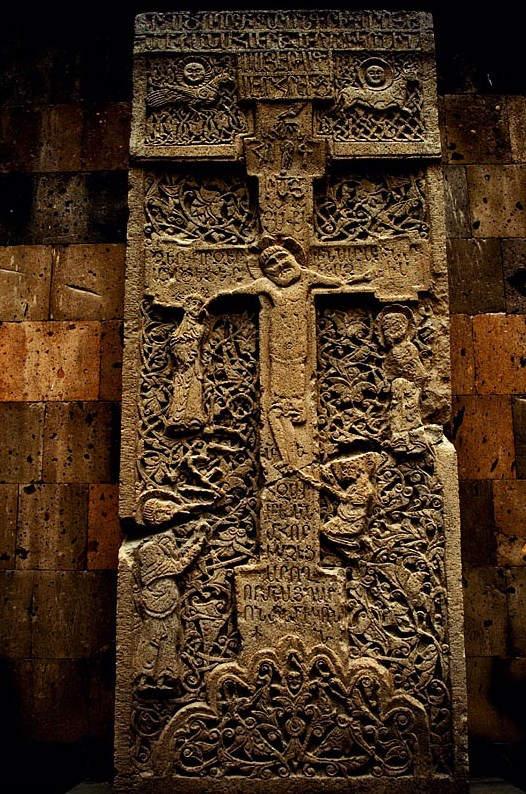
An Amenaprkich khachkhar in Etchmiadzin

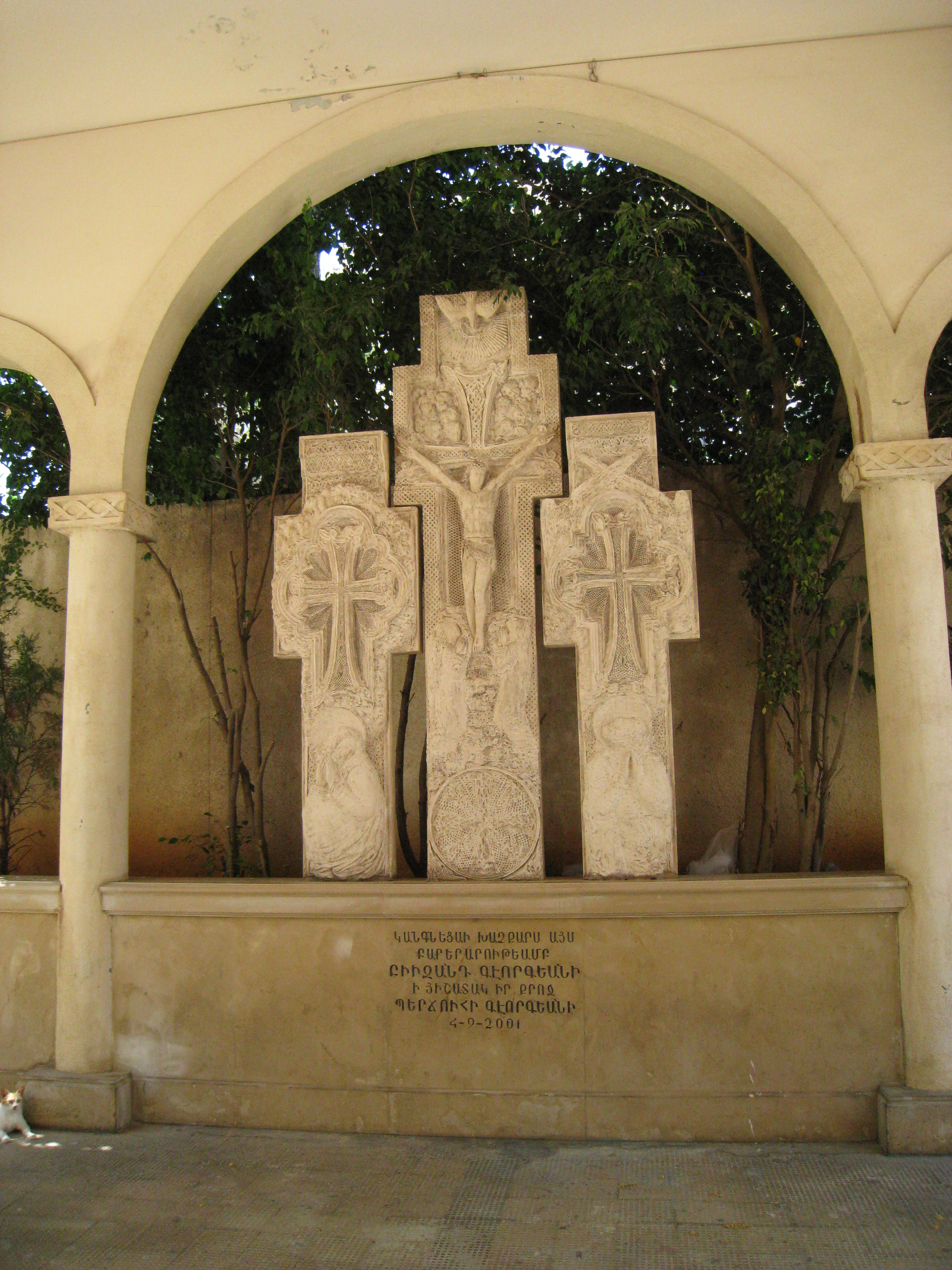
Amenaprkich khatchkar with two others at the Sourp Nshan Cathedral in downtown Beirut, Lebanon (2001)

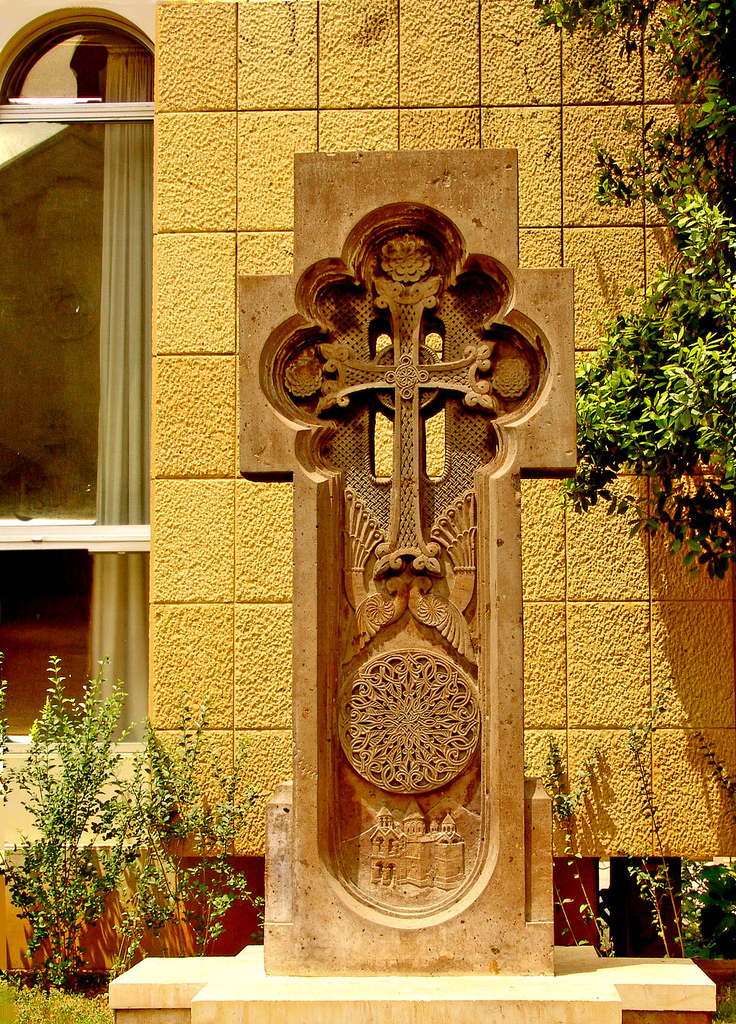
A khackhar at the Armenian Catholicossate of Cilicia in Antelias, Lebanon

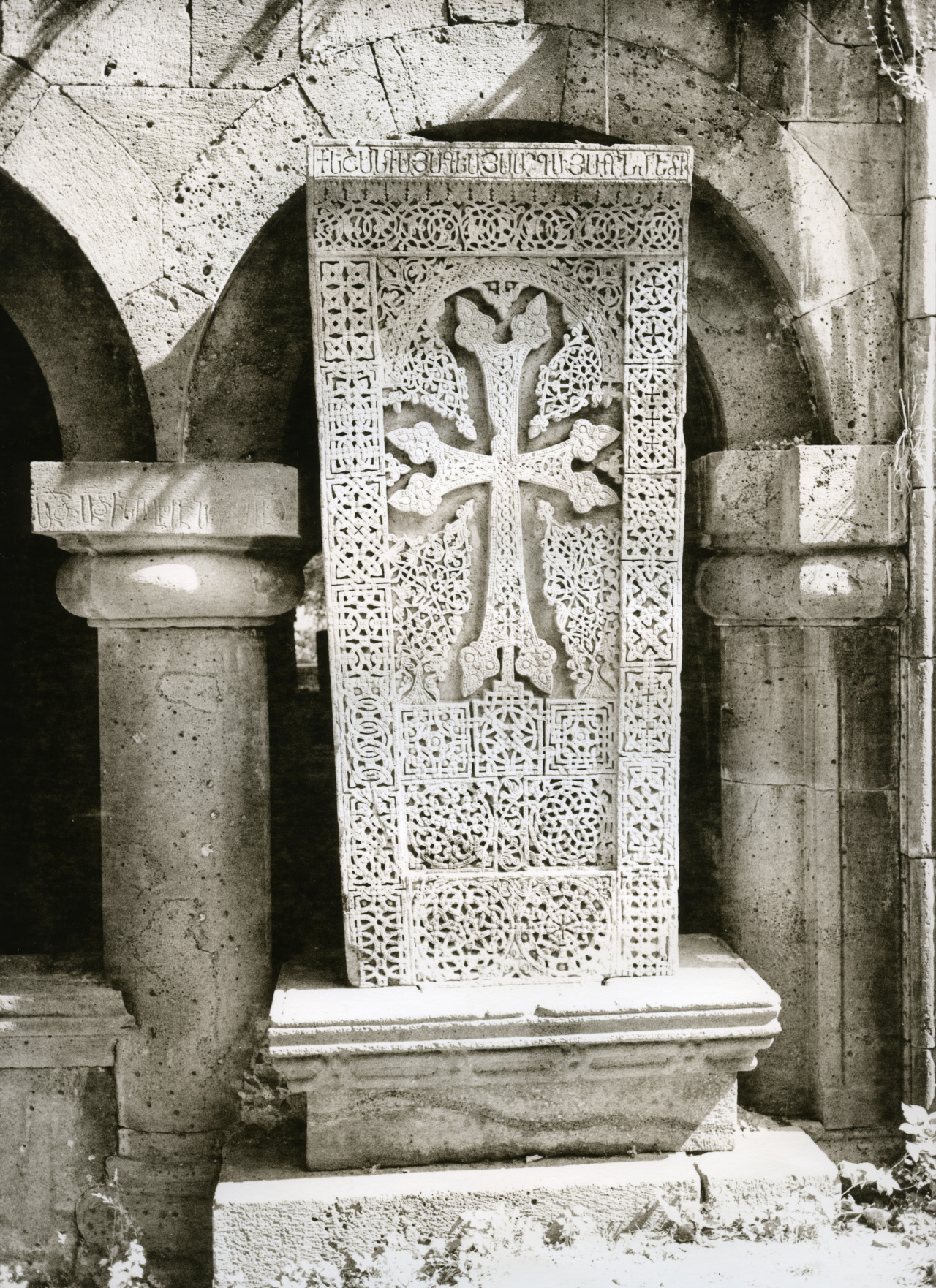
A khachkar in Sanahin

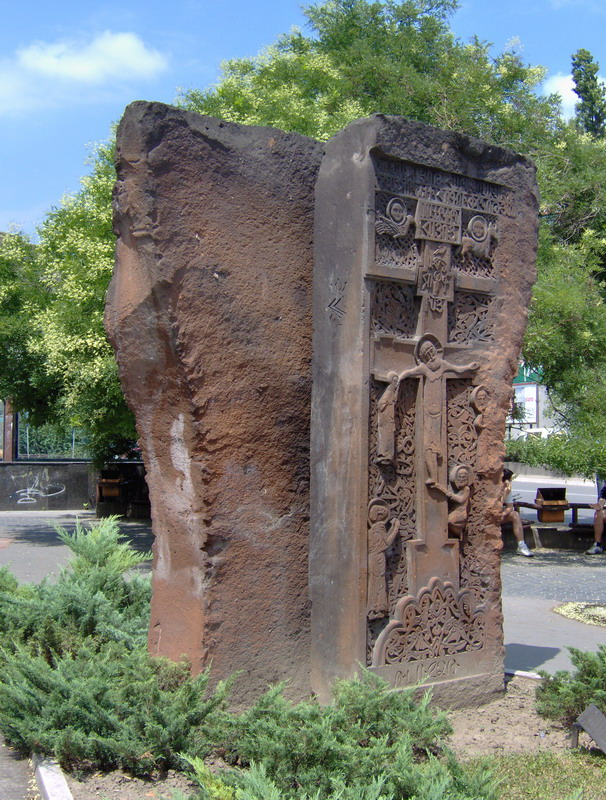
A modern, Amenaprkich-type, khachkar in Novi Sad, Serbia (1993)

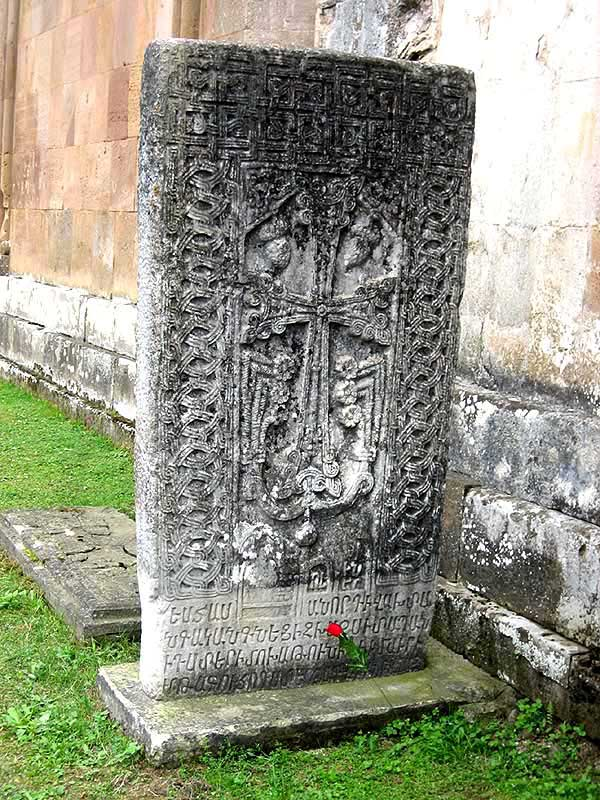
A large 13th-century khachkar at Gandzasar Monastery in Nagorno-Karabakh

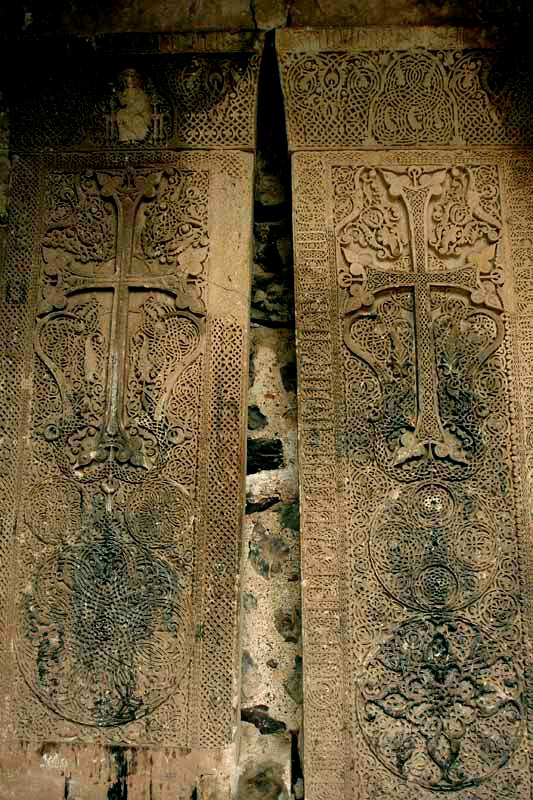
The famous double khachkars of the Memorial Bell-Tower of the Dadivank Monastery in Nagorno-Karabakh

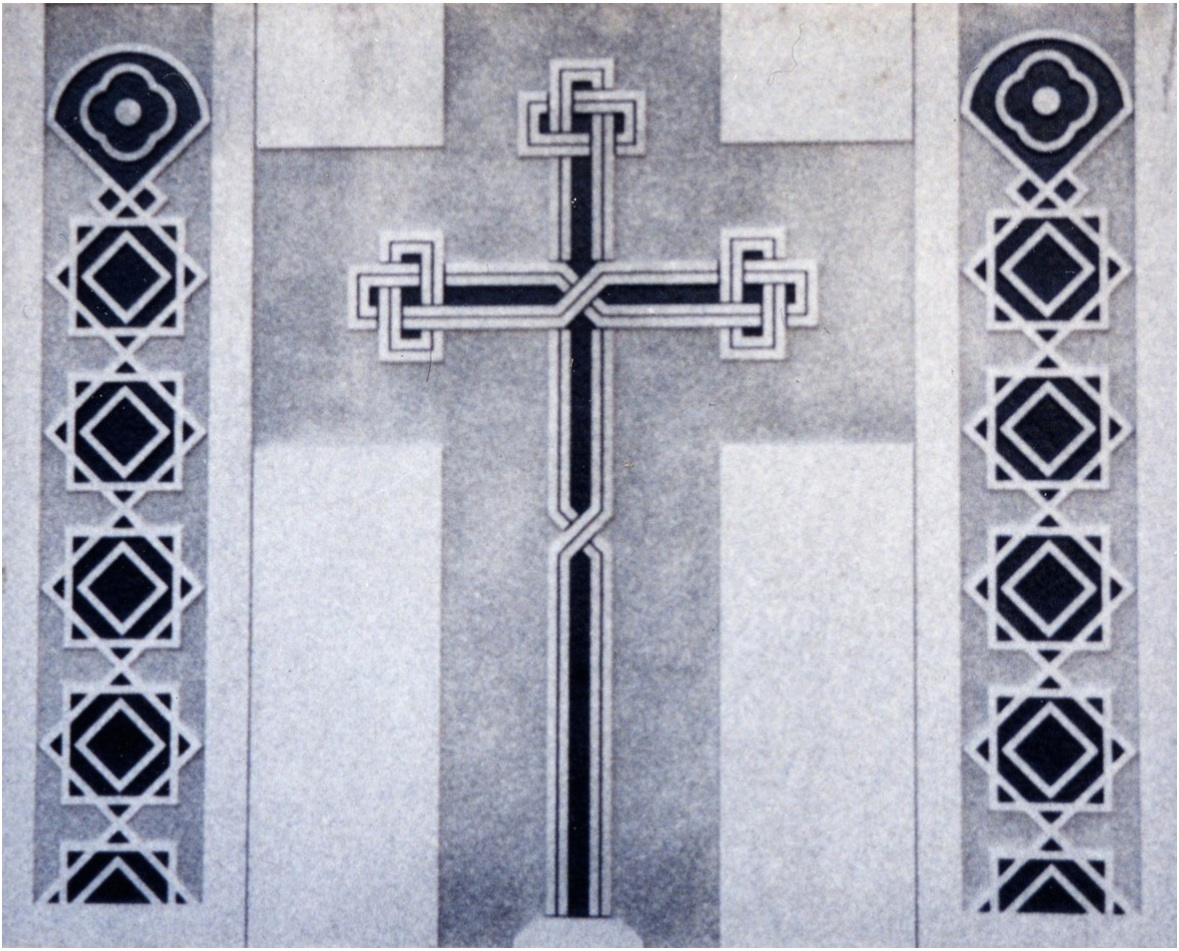
Modern khachkar (1999), St. James Armenian Church in Watertown, MA, USA

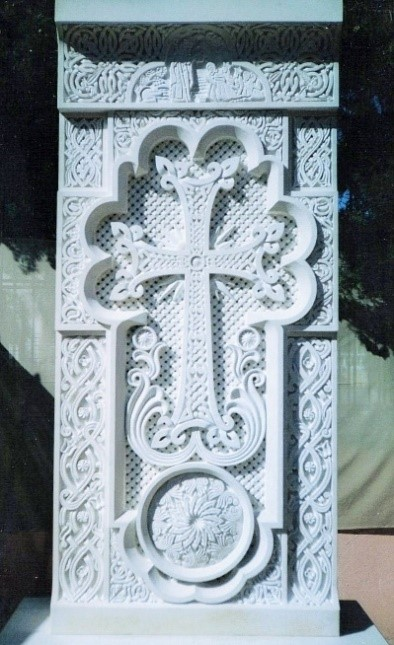

USVA Headstone Emblem 42

=== Drawings of Armenian Cross ===
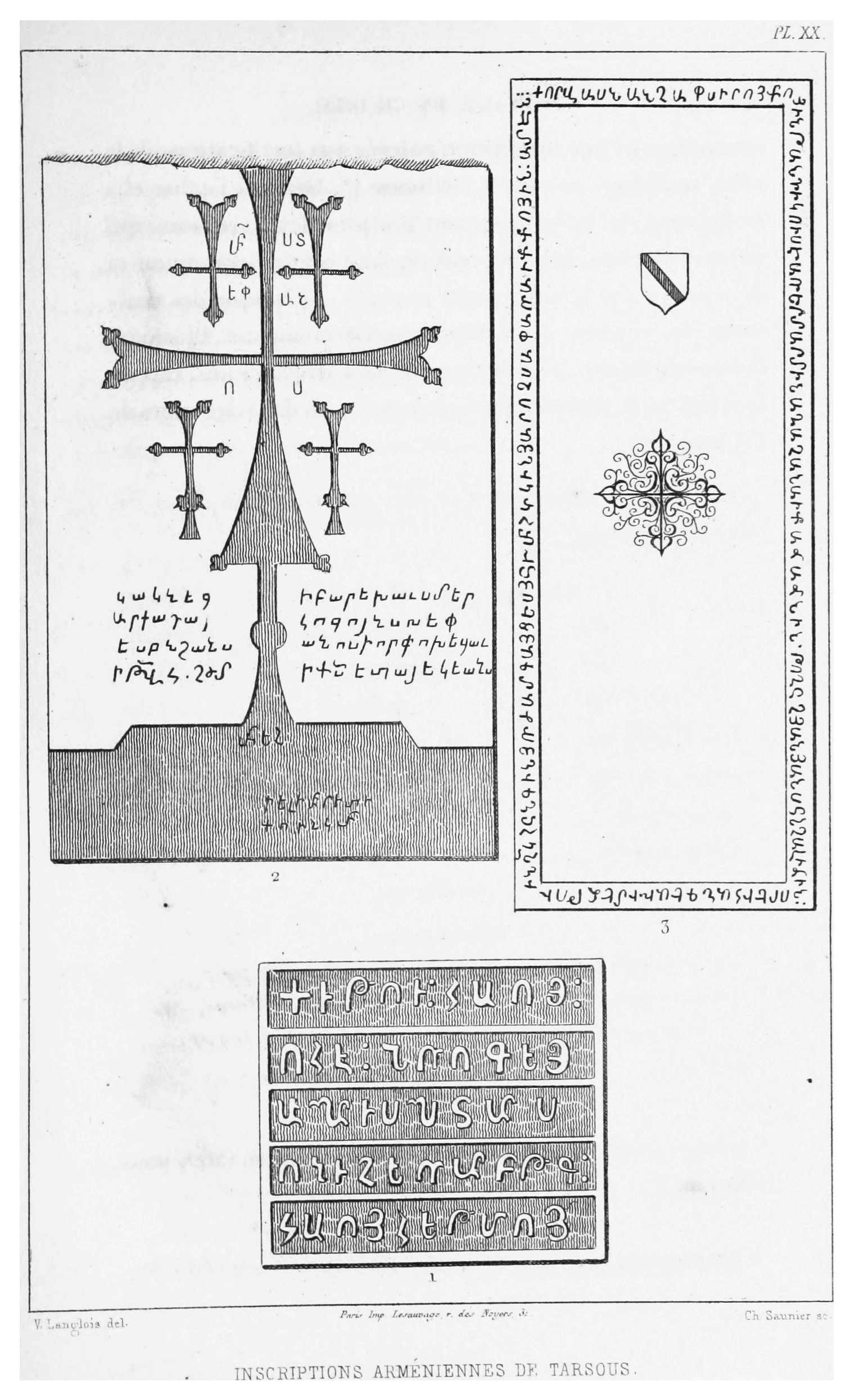
Armenian inscriptions in Tarsus by Victor Langlois

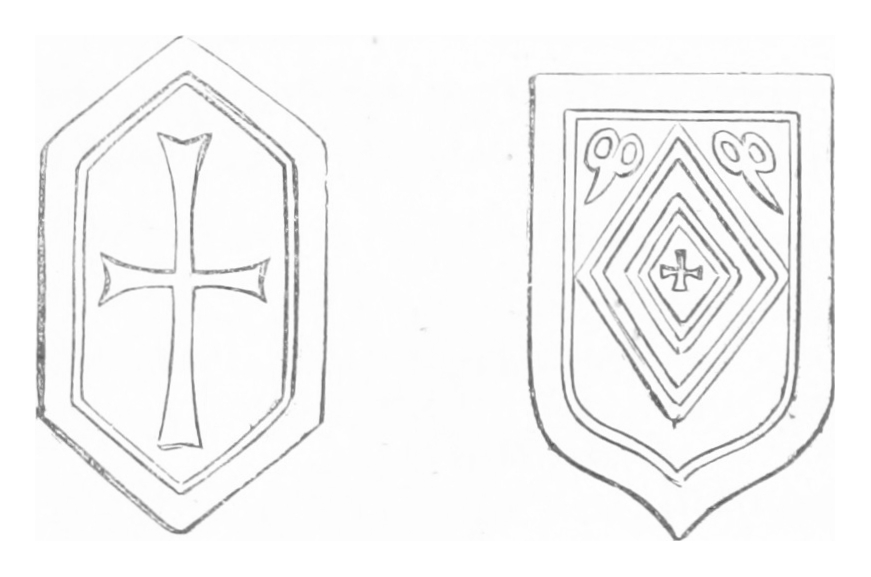
Inscriptions on the Armenian church in Tarsus by Victor Langlois

== See also ==
- Celtic knot
- High cross
- Khachkar

== Bibliography ==
- Thierry, Jean-Michel (1989). Armenian Art. New York: Harry N. Abrams. ISBN 0-8109-0625-2.
