= Aramazd =

Creator god in pre-Christian Armenian mythology

Aramazd Արամազդ
- King of the gods; Chief and Creator God
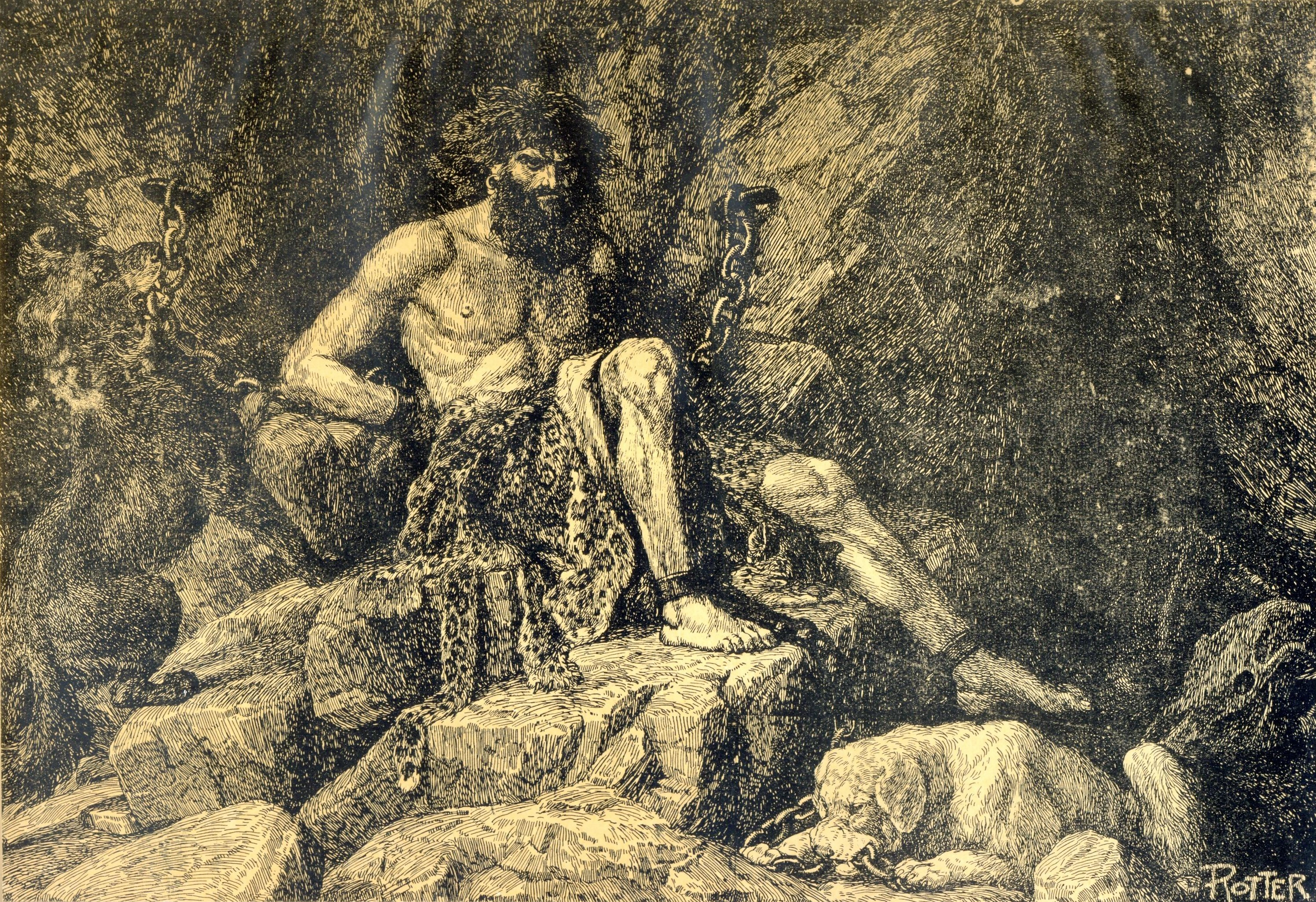
- Aramazd by Josef Rotter, 1939
- Major cult center: Kemah
- Day: 15th day of each month in the Armenian calendar
- Gender: male

Genealogy
- Children: Anahit, Vahagn, Nane and Mihr

Equivalents
- Greek: Zeus
- Roman: Jupiter

Aramazd was the chief and creator god in the Armenian version of Zoroastrianism. The deity and his name were derived from the deity Ahura Mazda after the Median conquest of Armenia in the 6th century BC. Aramazd was regarded as a generous god of fertility, rain, and abundance, as well as the father of the other gods, including Anahit, Mihr, and Nane. Like Ahura Mazda, Aramazd was seen as the father of the other gods, rarely with a wife, though sometimes husband to Anahit or Spandaramet. Aramazd was the Parthian form of Ahura Mazda.

== Name ==
The merging of the two words of Ahura Mazda first appears in the Old Persian section of the Behistun Inscription, carved by the Achaemenid King of Kings Darius the Great (r. 522 – 486 BC), who refers to the deity as Auramazdāha. Avestan documents continued to spell the name with two words, a form which may have been accepted in Armenia. Aramazd is the Parthian form of Ahura Mazda.

== History ==
Aramazd, Mihr, Anahit, Vahagn and Tir were the dominant deities of the Armenian pantheon. Later attempts were made to reform the pantheon, including possibly reducing it to comprise three leading deities instead: Aramazd, Anahit, and Vahagn. The main sanctuary of Aramazd was located in Kamax in northern Armenia. Another sanctuary of Aramazd was located in Bagavan, which was near the seat of power in the Ararat Plain. In Zoroastrianism, Ahura Mazda is considered the creator of wealth, and thus Armenians admired Aramazd as the giver of parart-utiwn (a loanword from Iranian, meaning "fatness, abundance"). One of the features of Parthian Zoroastrianism was that they had cult statues of the gods, which the Armenians imitated. Aramazd was associated with the Greek god Zeus.

== Identification with other deities ==
Aramazd was readily identified with Zeus through interpretatio Graeca, the two often sharing specific titles regarding greatness, bravery, or strength. There was some disagreement in scholarship as to the relationship between Aramazd, Amanor, and Vanatur, but the evidence most strongly indicates that Vanatur ("Lord of the Van") was a title for the chief deity (be it Ḫaldi or Ahura Mazda/Aramazd, though recorded uses are only as a title for Aramazd), and that Amanor was both a common noun referring the new year and a title for the deity whose celebration was held on the new year (Vanatur, whether Ḫaldi or Aramazd).

== See also ==
- Astghik
- Hayk
- Vahagn

== Sources ==
- Boyce, Mary (2001). Zoroastrians: Their Religious Beliefs and Practices. Psychology Press. ISBN 978-0415239035.
- Canepa, Matthew (2018). The Iranian Expanse: Transforming Royal Identity Through Architecture, Landscape, and the Built Environment, 550 BCE–642 CE. Oakland: University of California Press. ISBN 9780520379206.
- Ellerbrock, Uwe (2021). The Parthians: The Forgotten Empire. Oxford: Routledge. ISBN 978-0367481902.
- Garsoïan, Nina (1985). Armenia between Byzantium and the Sasanians. Variorum Reprints. ISBN 978-0860781660.
- La Porta, Sergio (2018). "Zoroastrianism, Armenian". In Nicholson, Oliver (ed.). The Oxford Dictionary of Late Antiquity. Oxford: Oxford University Press. ISBN 978-0-19-866277-8.
- Petrosyan, Armen (2002). The Indo‑european and Ancient Near Eastern Sources of the Armenian Epic. Washington, D.C. : Institute for the Study of Man. ISBN 9780941694810.
- Petrosyan, Armen (2007). "State Pantheon of Greater Armenia: Earliest Sources" (PDF). Aramazd: Armenian Journal of Near Eastern Studies. 2: 174–201. ISSN 1829-1376.
- Russell, James R. (1987). Zoroastrianism in Armenia. Harvard University Press. ISBN 978-0674968509.
- Russell, James R. (2004). Armenian and Iranian studies. Harvard Armenian Texts and Studies. Vol. 9. Harvard University Press. ISBN 978-0935411195.
- Russell, James R. (2005). "Armenian mythology". The Oxford Companion to World Mythology. Oxford: Oxford University Press. ISBN 978-0-19991-648-1.
- Frenschkowski, Marco (2015). "Christianity". In Stausberg, Michael; Vevaina, Yuhan Sohrab-Dinshaw; Tessmann, Anna (eds.). The Wiley Blackwell Companion to Zoroastrianism. John Wiley And Sons Ltd. pp. 457–477.
