= Armenian Mesopotamia =

Historical region of Armenia

- Period: Ancient history
- Dates: 401 BC – 387 AD
- Preceded by: Satrapy of Armenia
- Followed by: Kingdom of Armenia (antiquity)

Armenian Mesopotamia (Armenian: Հայոց Միջագետք) was a region in Northern Mesopotamia that was inhabited partly by Armenians. In antiquity, this region bordered the Armenian provinces of Tsopk and Aghdznik to the North, as well as Assyrian Mesopotamia and Commagene to its south. Northern Mesopotamia came under Armenian rule during the reign of Tigranes the Great (95 BC - 55 BC). However, Tigranes’ empire in Mesopotamia came to an end in 66 BC when he submitted to the Roman statesman and general Pompeius. By 37 BC, only eight of its provinces remained part of the Kingdom of Armenia. The remaining part of the territory was split up between Rome and Persia. For most of its history, Armenian Mesopotamia was primarily composed of the major cities of Diyarbakir (Amid), Tigranocerta, Dara, Tur Abdin (Cephas), Dadima, Arsamosata, and Citharizum. Its Armenian population remained until the Armenian genocide of WWI.

== History ==
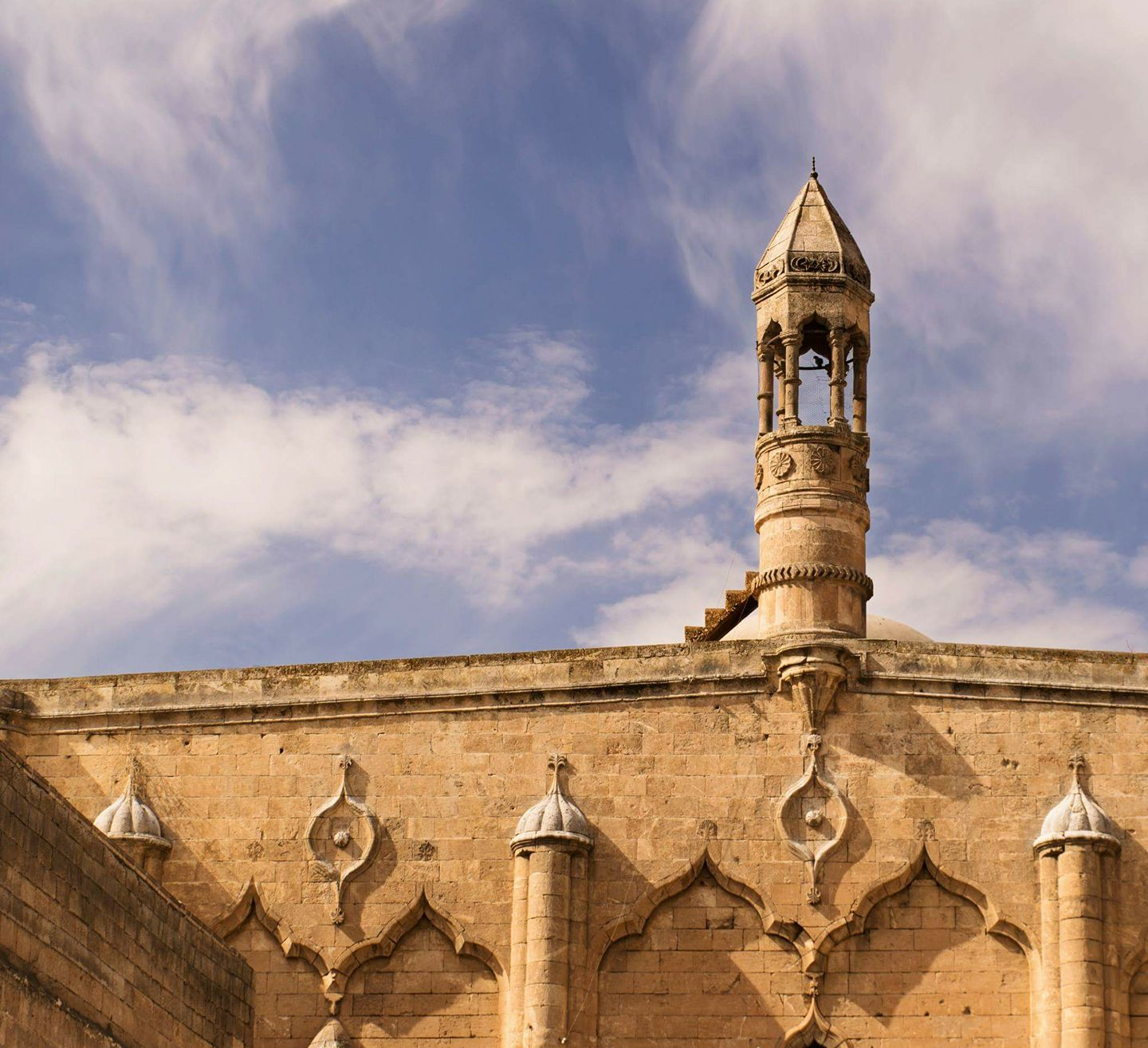
11th century Armenian church in historic Edessa (now Urfa)

Armenian communities in the regions of Greater Syria and Mesopotamia date back to antiquity in pre-Christian times. Historically, the borders of Armenia extended to Mesopotamia and a large number of Armenian merchants and artisans migrated there during the Achaemenid and Seleucid periods. When the region came under Armenian rule during the reign of Tigranes the Great, many Armenian administrators, merchants, and artisans were settled in Mesopotamia. Even after the region was retaken by the Romans, significant Mesopotamian Armenian communities continued to exist, especially in the cities of Antioch, Amida, and Edessa. In the latter two cities, Mesrop Mashtots, the creator of the Armenian alphabet, travelled with his disciples to find inspiration for the Armenian alphabet. A large number of Armenians moved to northern Mesopotamia following the conquest of the Bagratid Kingdom of Armenia by the Byzantine Empire in the 11th century AD.

== See also ==
- List of regions of old Armenia
