= Vardavar =

Annual water festival in Armenia

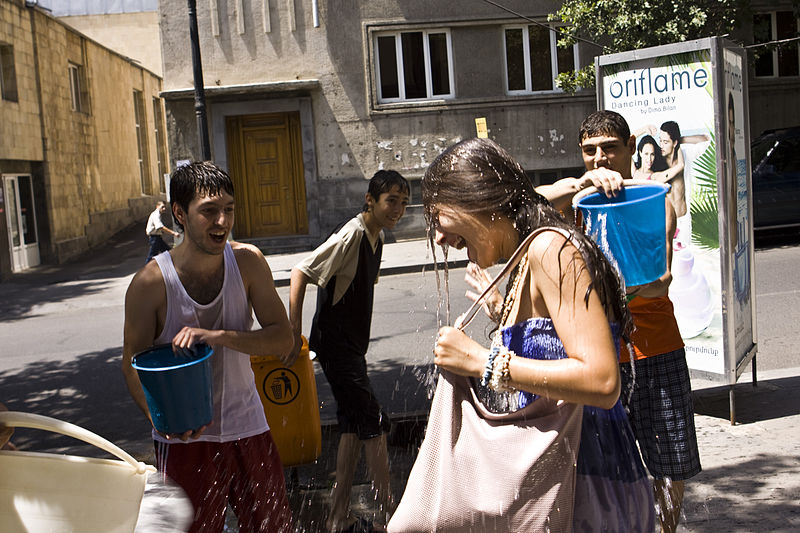
Yerevan, 2011

Vardavar or Vartavar (Armenian: Վարդավառ, Homshetsi: Vartevor or Behur) is a festival in Armenia where people drench each other with water. It is included in the intangible cultural heritage list of Armenia.

== Origin ==
Vardavar's history dates back to pagan times. The ancient festival is traditionally associated with the goddess Astghik, who was the goddess of water, beauty, love, and fertility. According to tradition the festivities associated with this religious observance of Astghik were named “Vardavar” because Armenians offered her roses as a celebration (vard means "rose" in Armenian and var means "to burn/be burning", this is why it was celebrated in the harvest time). However, this is a folk etymology, with the second root var likely reflecting an Indo-European root meaning "to bring". After the Christianization of Armenia, the Armenian Apostolic Church identified the rose with the transfiguration of Jesus and Vardavar continued to be celebrated along with the Feast of the Transfiguration. Some claim it comes from a tradition dating back to Noah, in which he commanded that his descendants should sprinkle water on each other and let doves fly as a symbol of remembrance of the Flood.

The historian of ancient religions Albert de Jong explains that the water rite of Vardavar bears strong resemblance to a similar rite of the Iranian Zoroastrians of Yazd as part of the festival of Tir-o-Tištar.

== Date ==
Vardavar is generally celebrated 98 days (14 weeks) after Easter in the republic and the diaspora when the Armenian Apostolic Church celebrates the Feast of the Transfiguration. In some regions, however, it is held on different days, and traditions differ too.

Vardavar Celebration Days
Year	Day
2010	July 11
2011	July 31
2012	July 15
2013	July 7
2014	July 27
2015	July 12
2016	July 3
2017	July 23
2018	July 8
2019	July 28
2020	July 19
2021	July 11
2022	July 24
2023	July 16
2024	July 7
2025	July 27
2026	July 12

== Festival ==
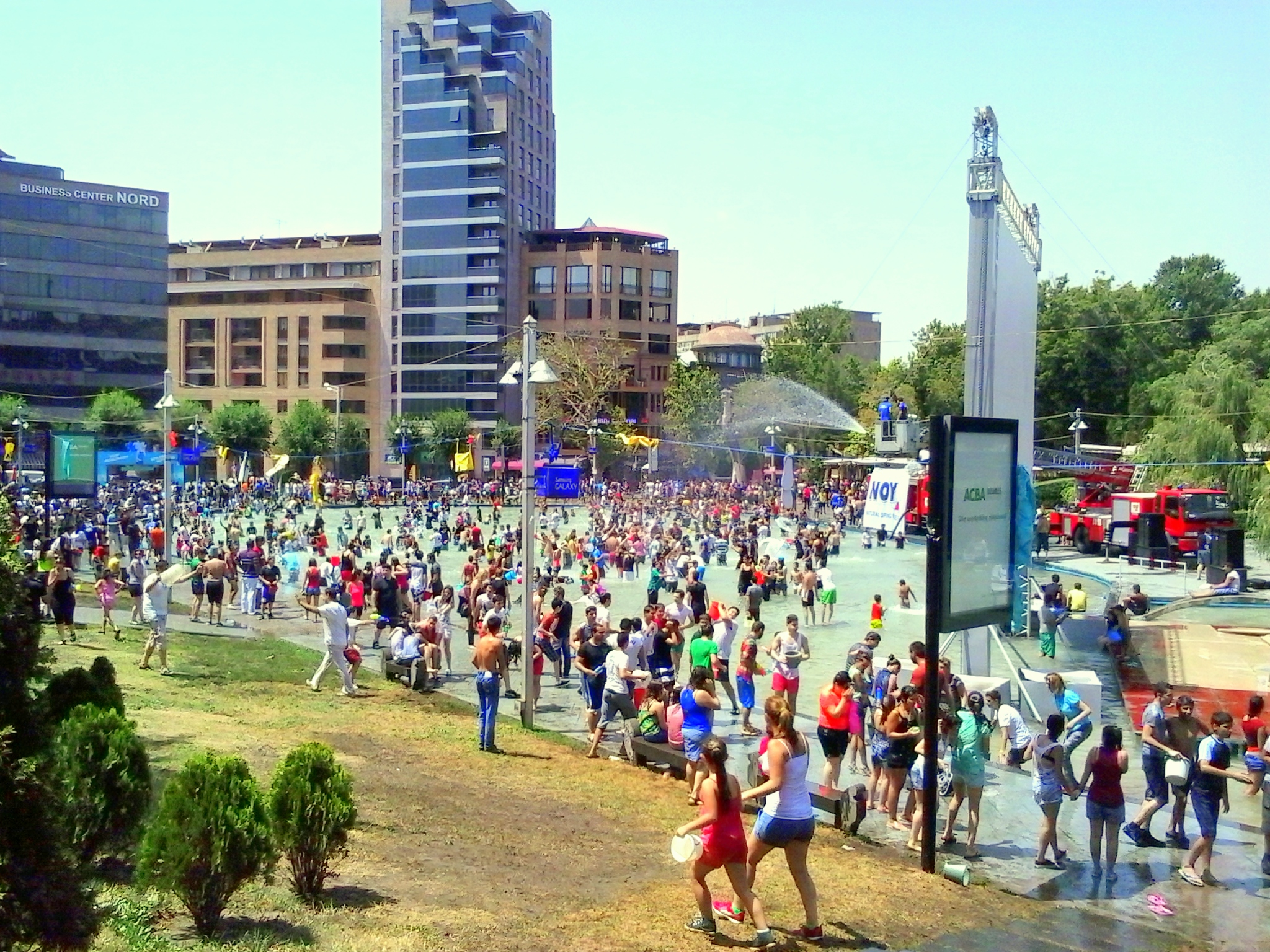
The water festival in the center of Yerevan, 2014

During the day of Vardavar, people from a wide array of ages are allowed to douse strangers with water. It is common to see people pouring buckets of water from balconies on unsuspecting people walking below them. The festival is very popular among children as it is one day where they can get away with pulling pranks. It is also a means of refreshment on the usually hot and dry summer days of July or late June.

Federation of Youth Clubs of Armenia (FYCA) each year organizes the "Vardavar International Festival" which is a cognitive, educational and cultural festival. Every year it takes place in the medieval monastery of Geghard and old pagan temple of Garni. The festival aims to present the Armenian national and traditional culture.

In addition to the celebrations, the traditional ceremony of splashing water on each other and the blessings of the youth, the Armenian folk songs are also included and performed by the Nairyan Vocal Ensamble. The Vardavar holiday theme pavilions represent the traditions and handmade works of different regions of Armenia.

== Outside Armenia ==
Vardavar is also celebrated by Armenians in Russia and in Glendale, California.

== In popular culture ==
Vardavar was featured on episode 2 of season 3 of Mickey Mouse Funhouse on 1 March 2024. Minnie chooses the wrong outfit to celebrate Vardavar; they are then seen eating Khorovats (Armenian BBQ) and Tahn (Armenian yogurt drink). The episode marks the first-ever representation of Armenian culture at Disney.

== See also ==
- Public holidays in Armenia
- Songkran
- Nusardil
