= Nane (goddess) =

Armenian goddess of war

Nane Նանե
- Goddess of motherhood, war and wisdom
- Symbol: spear and shield
- Gender: female
- Ethnic group: Armenian

Genealogy
- Parents: Aramazd
- Siblings: Anahit, Vahagn and Mihr

Equivalents
- Greek: Athena

Nane (Armenian: Նանե, romanized: Nanē) was an Armenian mother goddess, as well as the goddess of war and wisdom.

Nane was depicted as a young beautiful woman in the clothing of a warrior, with spear and shield in hand, like the Hellenic Athena, with whom she identified in the Hellenic period. She has also been referred to as Hanea, Hanea, Babylonian Nana, Sumerian Nanai.

== Cult ==
Her cult was closely associated with the cult of the goddess Anahit. The temple of the goddess Nane was in the town of Thil across from the Lycus River. Her temple was destroyed during the Christianization of Armenia:

"Then they crossed the Lycus River and demolished the temple of Nane, Aramazd's daughter, in the town of Thil."

"Gregory then asked the king for permission to overthrow and destroy the pagan shrines and temples. Trdat readily issued an edict entrusting Gregory with this task, and himself set out from the city to destroy shrines along the highways."

According to some authors, Nane was adopted from the Akkadian goddess Nanaya, from the Phrygian goddess Cybele, or was from Elamite origin.

== See also ==
- Anahit
- Aramazd
- Nana (disambiguation)

== Bibliography ==
- Petrosyan, Armen (2002). The Indo‑european and Ancient Near Eastern Sources of the Armenian Epic. Washington, D.C.: Institute for the Study of Man. ISBN 9780941694810.
- Petrosyan, Armen (2007). "State Pantheon of Greater Armenia: Earliest Sources". Aramazd: Armenian Journal of Near Eastern Studies. 2: 174–201. ISSN 1829-1376.
