= Albert de Jong =

A.F. de Jong, also known as Albert de Jong and Ab de Jong, is Professor of Comparative Religion and Religions of Antiquity at Leiden University. He studied Theology and Persian in Utrecht, and Old and Middle Iranian languages at SOAS University of London. De Jong obtained his PhD in 1996 from the University of Utrecht, with his dissertation dealing with Zoroastrianism in Greek and Latin literature.

== Selected publications ==
A selection of de Jong's works:

- Jong A.F. de (2018), Spiritual Elite Communities in the Contemporary Middle East, Sociology of Islam 6(2): 116-140
- Jong A.F. de (2017), Being Iranian in Antiquity (at Home and Abroad). In: Strootman R., Versluys M.J. (Eds.) Persianism in Antiquity. no. 25 Stuttgart: Franz Steiner Verlag. 35-47
- Jong A.F. de (2016), First Man, First Twins: The Origins of Humankind in Zoroastrian Thought. In: Houtman A., Kadari T., Poorthuis M. (Eds.) Religious Stories in Transformation: Conflict, Revision and Reception. Jewish and Christian Perspectives no. 31 Leiden: Brill. 52–65.
- Jong A.F. de (2016), Parthian Heritage - Persian Culture; How the Shahnama became the Persian "National" Epic. In: Sharma S., Waghmar B. (Eds.) Firdawsii Millennium Indicum: Proceedings of the Shahnama Millenary Seminar, the K.R. Cama Oriental Institute Mumbai, 8–9 January 2011. Mumbai: The K.R. Cama Oriental Institute. 35-44
- Jong A.F. de (2016), The Denkard and the Zoroastrians of Baghdad. In: Williams A.V., Stewart S., Hintze A. (Eds.) The Zoroastrian Flame: Exploring Religion, History and Tradition. London: I.B. Tauris. 223-238
- Jong A.F. de (2016), Waar het vuur niet dooft: Joodse en christelijke gemeenschappen in het Sasanidenrijk, Nederlands Theologisch Tijdschrift 70(3): 175-186 (in Dutch)
- Jong A.F. de (2015), Armenian and Georgian Zoroastrianism. In: Stausberg M., Vevaina Y.S.-D. (Eds.) The Wiley Blackwell Companion to Zoroastrianism. Oxford: Wiley Blackwell. 119-128
- Jong A.F. de (2015), Religion and Politics in Pre-Islamic Iran. In: Stausberg M., Vevaina Y.S.-D. (Eds.) The Wiley Blackwell Companion to Zoroastrianism. Oxford: Wiley Blackwell. 85-101
- Jong A.F. de (2013), Hatra and the Parthian Commonwealth. In: Dirven L (Ed.) Hatra. Politics, Culture and Religion between Parthia and Rome. Stuttgart: Franz Steiner Verlag. 143-160
- Jong A.F. de (2013), Magi, Persian. In: Bagnall R.S., Brodersen K., Champion C.B., Erskine A., Huebner S. (Eds.) Encyclopedia of Ancient History. Chichester: Wiley-Blackwell. 4220
- Jong A.F. de (2013), Ostanes. In: Bagnall R.S., Brodersen K., Champion C.B., Erskine A., Huebner S. (Eds.) Encyclopedia of Ancient History. Chichester: Wiley-Blackwell. 4956-4957
- Jong A.F. de (2013), Religion, Persian. In: Bagnall R.S., Brodersen K., Champion C.B., Erskine A., Huebner S. (Eds.) Encyclopedia of Ancient History. Chichester: Wiley-Blackwell. 5787-5788
- Jong A.F. de (2013), Zoroastrianism. In: Bagnall R.S., Brodersen K., Champion C.B., Erskine A., Huebner S. (Eds.) Encyclopedia of Ancient History. Chichester: Wiley-Blackwell. 7183-7185
- Jong A.F. de (2013), Religion in Iran: The Parthian and Sasanian Periods (247 BCE - 654 CE). In: Salzman M.R., Adler W. (Eds.) The Cambridge History of Religions in the Ancient World, volume II: From the Hellenistic Age to Late Antiquity. Cambridge: Cambridge University Press. 23-53
- Jong A.F. de (2010), Iranian Connections in the Dead Sea Scrolls. In: Lim T.H., Collins J.J. (Eds.) The Oxford Handbook of the Dead Sea Scrolls. Oxford: Oxford University Press. 479-500
- Jong A.F. de (2003), Pazand and retranscribed Pahlavi: On the Philology and History of Late Zoroastrian Literature. In: Persian Origins. Early Judaeo-Persian and the Emergence of New Persian (Iranica 6),. Wiesbaden: Wiesbaden
- Jong A.F. de (1997), Traditions of the Magi. Zoroastrianism in Greek & Latin Literature. Leiden: Brill.
