= Trndez =

Holiday in the Armenian Apostolic Church

Trndez, (Armenian: տրնդեզ) also called Tyarnndarach (Armenian: տյառնընդառաջ) is a feast of purification in the Armenian Apostolic Church and Armenian Catholic Churches, celebrated 40 days after Jesus' birth.

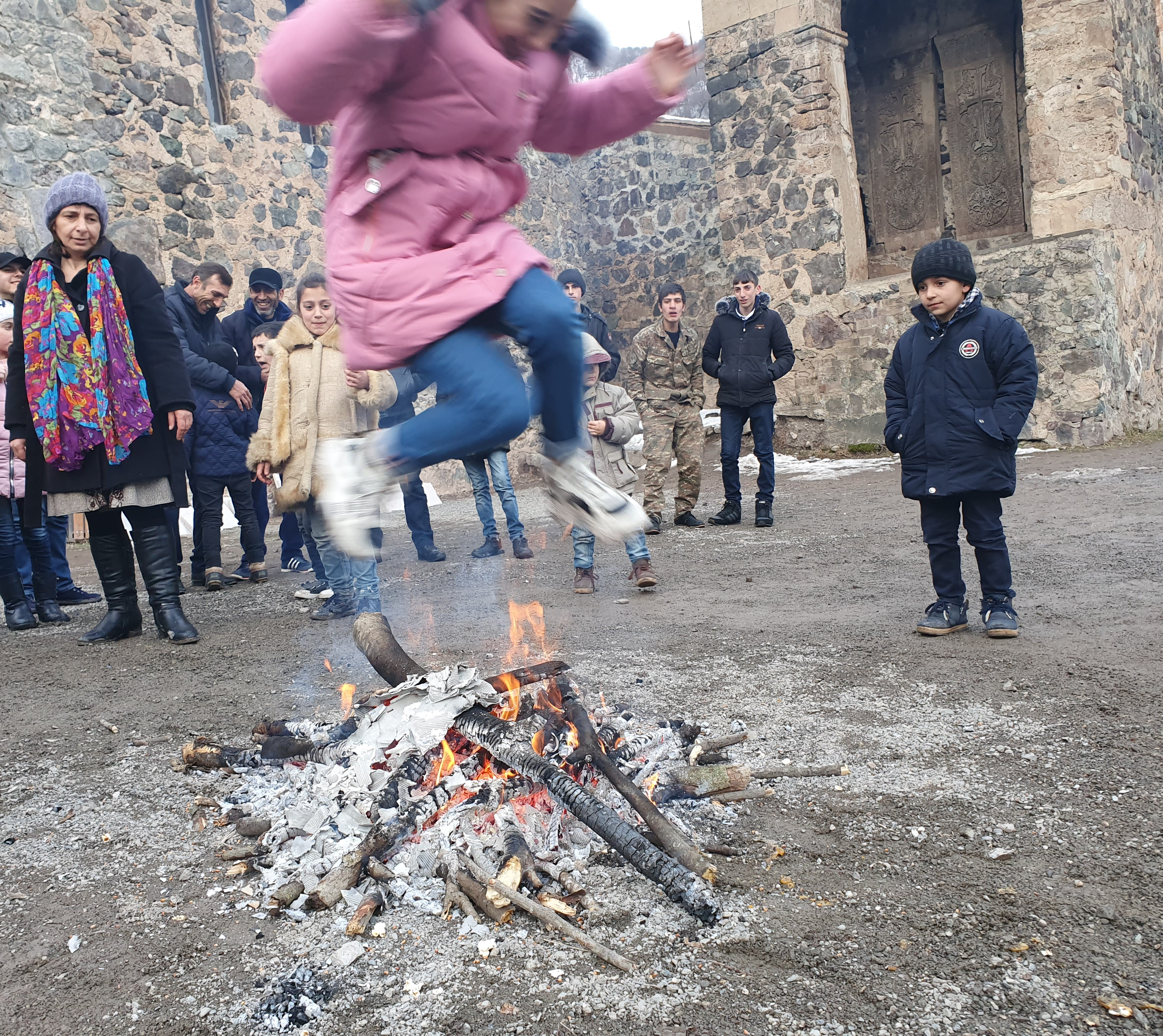
Young Armenians celebrate by jumping over the fire.

It has many similarities with Candlemas. The two churches celebrate this on different days, the 13th (with celebrations on the eve of the 14th of February) and the 2nd of February. The celebration of Trndez is pagan in origin, and is originally connected with sun/fire worship in ancient pre-Christian Armenia, symbolizing the coming of spring and fertility. It was originally referred to as Derendez, meaning “a bundle of straw in front of your house.” In ancient Armenia, the event was associated with the worship of Vahagn, the Armenian god of fire, sun, war, and courage. People believe that the strength of the fire eradicates the winter’s cold and allow for fertile land and a prosperous harvest. Couples, especially newlyweds, jump over the Trndez flames for luck, prosperity, and fertility. The fire’s ashes are believed to have healing properties as people use it as an ointment for pain and rub it into their eyelids to improve their eyesight.

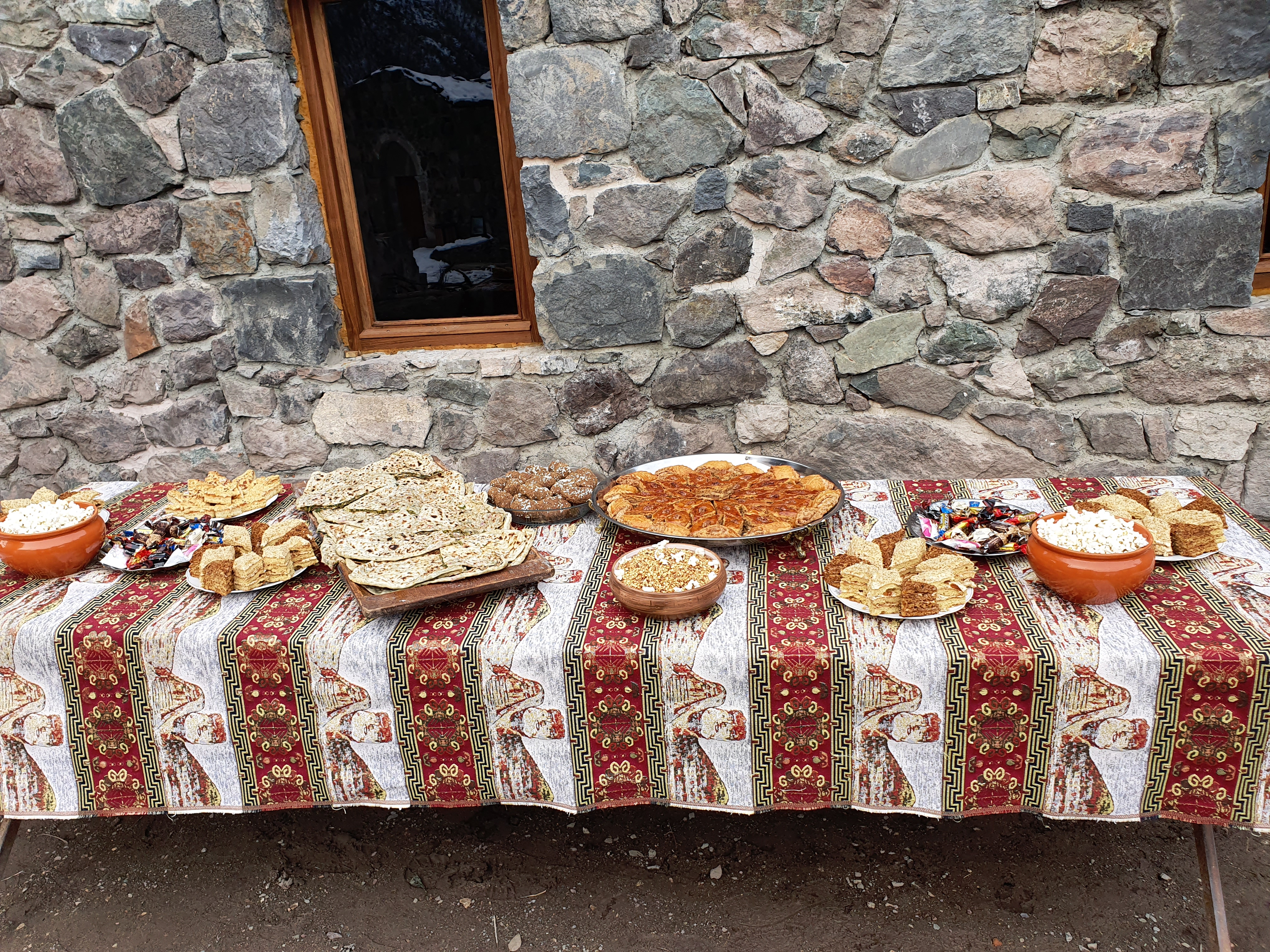
Traditional Trndez feast sweets and dishes at the Armenian Apostolic monastery Dadivank

Armenian customs include the preparation of a traditional Armenian snack known as aghandz, made from toasted wheat and hemp. It is traditionally eaten by couples who are newly married or engaged after they leap over the fire. The mixture is often enhanced with ingredients such as sesame seeds, peas, raisins, and other dried fruits, giving it a pleasantly sweet taste. Large trays of festive foods are typically shared near the fire, including a related dish called pokhind, which consists of baked and ground grains mixed with honey or fruit syrup.

== See also ==
- Chaharshanbe Suri
