= Mihr (Armenian deity) =

Ancient Armenian deity

Mihr (Armenian: Միհր) is the Armenian deity of fire, regarded as the son of the supreme god Aramazd. Mihr can be identified with the Greek God of blacksmiths, craftsmen, and fire, Hephaestus. The seventh month in Armenian calendar has been dedicated to either Mihr or Mithra, and called by Armenians, Mehekan.

== Etymology ==
The name "Mihr" takes its roots from the name of the Zoroastrian god of light, Mithra, also known as Mihr or Mehr. The ancient Armenian word mehean, meaning "heathen temple", is connected with one of the variants of Mithra/Mihr's name. Mihr is related to many Armenian proper names such as Mihran, Mihrdat and Mehruzhan.

== Worship ==
After the fall of the Urartu, the Satrapy of Armenia had replaced it by the late 6th century, and the Armenian people renamed the Urartu deity of war, Ḫaldi, as Mihr, adopting the name of the Iranian god Mithra/Mher. In this identification a major role could have played their common characteristics, connection with fire and war. The worship of Mihr was centered in a region named Derjan, the district of the Upper Armenia, currently located in eastern Turkish territories. The Derjan's village of Bagayarich had a temple dedicated to Mihr. In 301 AD Christianity became the official religion of Armenia, and the Armenian church adopted many pagan rites and ceremonies. For example, the Christian fire-festival of Trndez, which has pagan roots, is still celebrated in February, the month originally dedicated to Mihr.

=== Triad in ancient Armenian religion ===
According to Vahan Kurkjian, the ideology behind the Armenian paganism, the indigenous Armenian mythology or religion, has no Avestan trait, because the notion of the ideal did not exist in Mazdeism. The ideology of the latter was based on the struggle between light and dark. However, the Armenians erected statues to honor the sun and the moon. Furthermore, Armenian paganism is characterized by the worship of a Triad. The Urartians worshipped three great gods: Haldis, Theispas, and Artinis. The same notion existed in later Armenian mythology, in which the Triad consisted of Aramazd, Anahit, and Mihr.

== See also ==
- Mitra
- Mithra/Mher

== Bibliography ==
- Petrosyan, Armen (2002). The Indo‑european and Ancient Near Eastern Sources of the Armenian Epic. Washington, D.C. : Institute for the Study of Man. ISBN 9780941694810.
- Petrosyan, Armen (2015). "State Pantheon of Greater Armenia: Earliest Sources". Problems of Armenian Prehistory. Myth, Language, History. Yerevan: Gitutyun. pp. 82–115. ISBN 9785808012011.
- Petrosyan, Armen (2006). "Haldi and Mithra/Mher". Aramazd: Armenian Journal of Near Eastern Studies. 1: 222–238. ISSN 1829-1376.
