= Matthew Canepa =

American art historian

Matthew Philip Canepa is an American historian of art, and archaeology; as well as a writer and educator. He is a professor of Art History and inaugural holder of the Elahé Omidyar Mir-Djalali Presidential Chair in Art History and Archaeology of Ancient Iran at the University of California, Irvine.

Canepa received his PhD from the University of Chicago. Canepa is a faculty member in UCI's Department of Art History and is an affiliate of the departments of History and Classics, Program in Critical Theory, and the Samuel Jordan Center for Persian Studies and Culture. According to Canepa's profile page at UC Irvine: "An historian of art, archaeology and religions his research focuses on the intersection of art, ritual and power in the eastern Mediterranean, Persia and the wider Iranian world". Canepa is, and has been, a fellow of numerous institutions, including the Society of Antiquaries of London, Guggenheim Fellowship, Institute for Advanced Study (Princeton), American Council of Learned Societies, German Archaeological Institute and Merton College (University of Oxford).

== Selected publications ==
A selection of Canepa's works:

- Canepa, Matthew P. (2010). The Two Eyes of the Earth: Art and Ritual of Kingship between Rome and Sasanian Iran. Berkeley, CA: University of California Press.
- Canepa, Matthew P. (2018). The Iranian Expanse: Transforming Royal Identity through Architecture, Landscape, and the Built Environment, 550 BCE–642 CE. University of California Press.
- Area advisor and editor for The Oxford Dictionary of Late Antiquity (2018)
- Canepa, Matthew P. (2024). Persian Cultures of Power and the Entanglement of the Afro-Eurasian World. Los Angeles: Getty Research Institute Press.
