= Saint Hripsime Church =

Church in Vagharshapat, Armenia

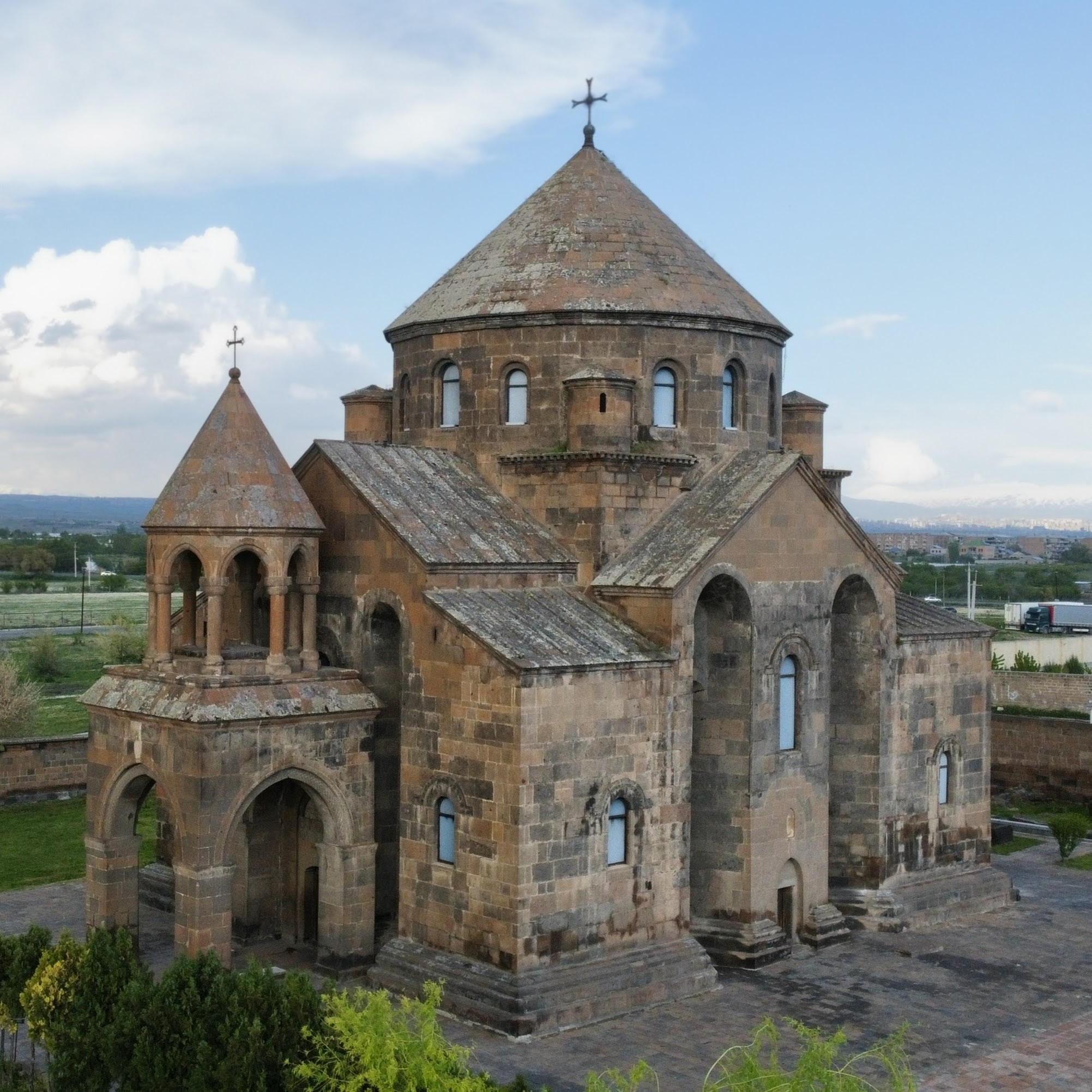

Religion
- Affiliation: Armenian Apostolic Church
- Status: Active

Location
- Location: 85 Mesrop Mashtots Street, Vagharshapat, Armavir Province, Armenia
- Interactive map of Saint Hripsime Church
- Coordinates: 40.1670°N 44.3095°E

Architecture
- Type: Domed tetraconch
- Style: Armenian
- Founder: Catholicos Komitas
- Completed: c. 618 (church); 1653 (portico); 1790 (belfry)

Specifications
- Length: 22.8 m (75 ft)
- Width: 17.7 m (58 ft)
- Interior area: 212 m^{2} (2,280 sq ft)
- Height (max): 32 m (105 ft)
- Dome height (inner): 23 m (75 ft)
- UNESCO World Heritage Site
- Official name: Cathedral and Churches of Echmiatsin and the Archaeological Site of Zvartnots
- Type: Cultural
- Criteria: (ii) (iii)
- Designated: 2000 (24th session)
- Reference no.: 1011-004
- Region: Western Asia

Saint Hripsime Church (Note: Armenian: Սուրբ Հռիփսիմե եկեղեցի, romanized: Surb Hṙip‘simē yekeghetsi or Հռիփսիմեի տաճար, Hṙip‘simēi tač̣ar. It is often referred to as a monastery (Սուրբ Հռիփսիմե վանք, Surb Hṙip‘simē vank'). Sometimes spelled Ripsime or Hripsimeh) is a seventh-century Armenian Apostolic church in the city of Vagharshapat (Etchmiadzin), Armenia. It was built in 618 by Catholicos Komitas over the tomb of Hripsime, a Roman virgin and a key figure in the Christianization of Armenia.

Standing largely intact since its construction, the church has been widely admired for its architecture and proportions. Considered a masterpiece of classical Armenian architecture, it has influenced many other Armenian churches. It features innovations, namely trapezoidal niches and conical squinches, containing their first dated examples, a windowed drum, and the only example in Armenia of turrets at the base of the drum serving as anchors and buttresses. The two inscriptions left by Komitas constitute the second-earliest extant Armenian-language inscriptions. The church was listed as a UNESCO World Heritage Site along with other nearby churches, including Etchmiadzin Cathedral, Armenia's mother church, in 2000.

== Setting and status ==
The church is located on a small natural elevation on the eastern outskirts of the town of Vagharshapat (Etchmiadzin), adjacent to the main road connecting it to the capital Yerevan. Standing on an open plain, it was situated near the road to Artaxata, outside the historic walls of ancient Vagharshapat. It is now within an urban environment. Several major historic churches are situated in its vicinity, namely the cathedral of Etchmiadzin, its contemporary Saint Gayane Church, the ruined 7th century Zvartnots Cathedral, and the 17th century Shoghakat Church.

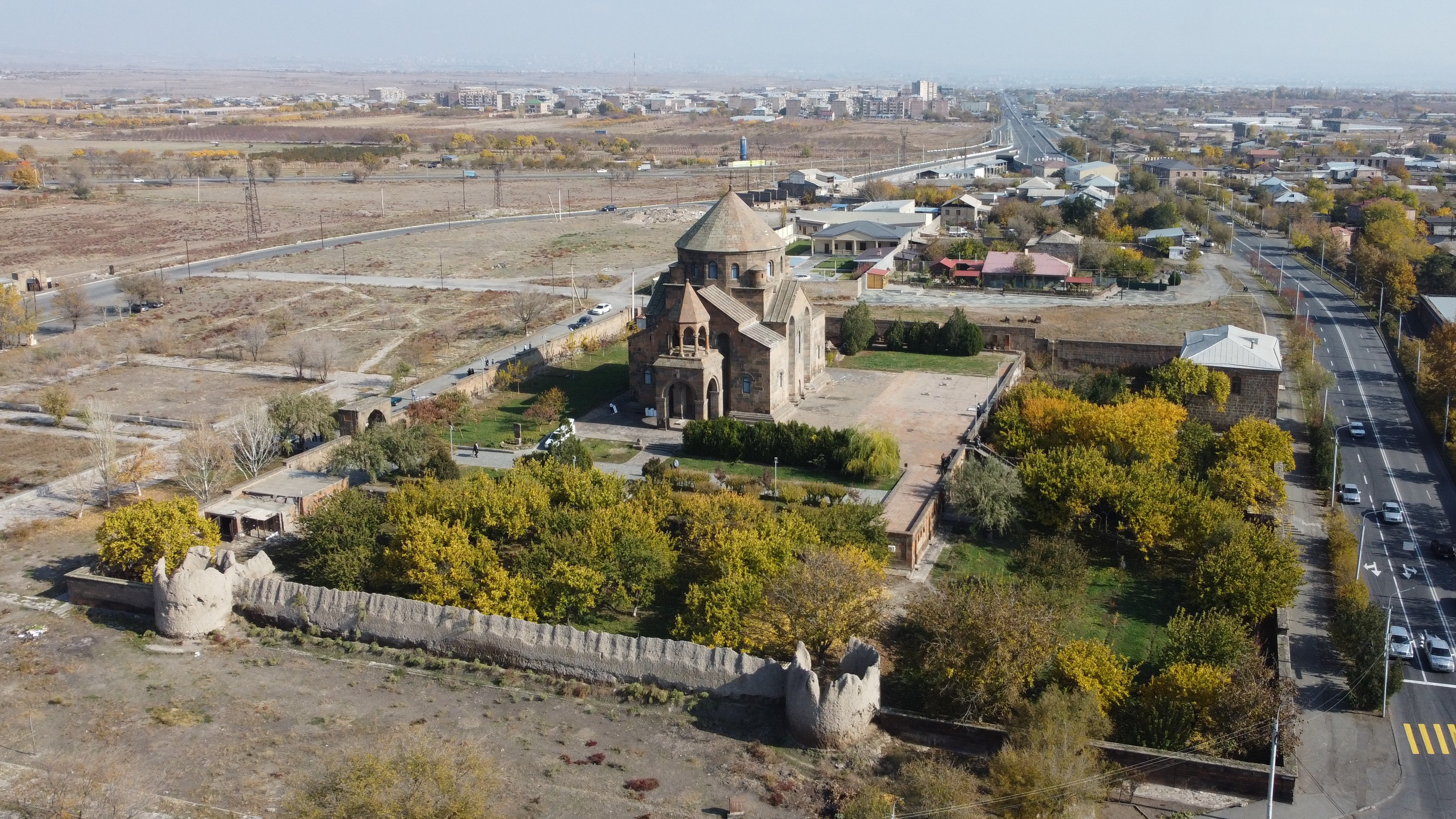
An aerial view of the complex

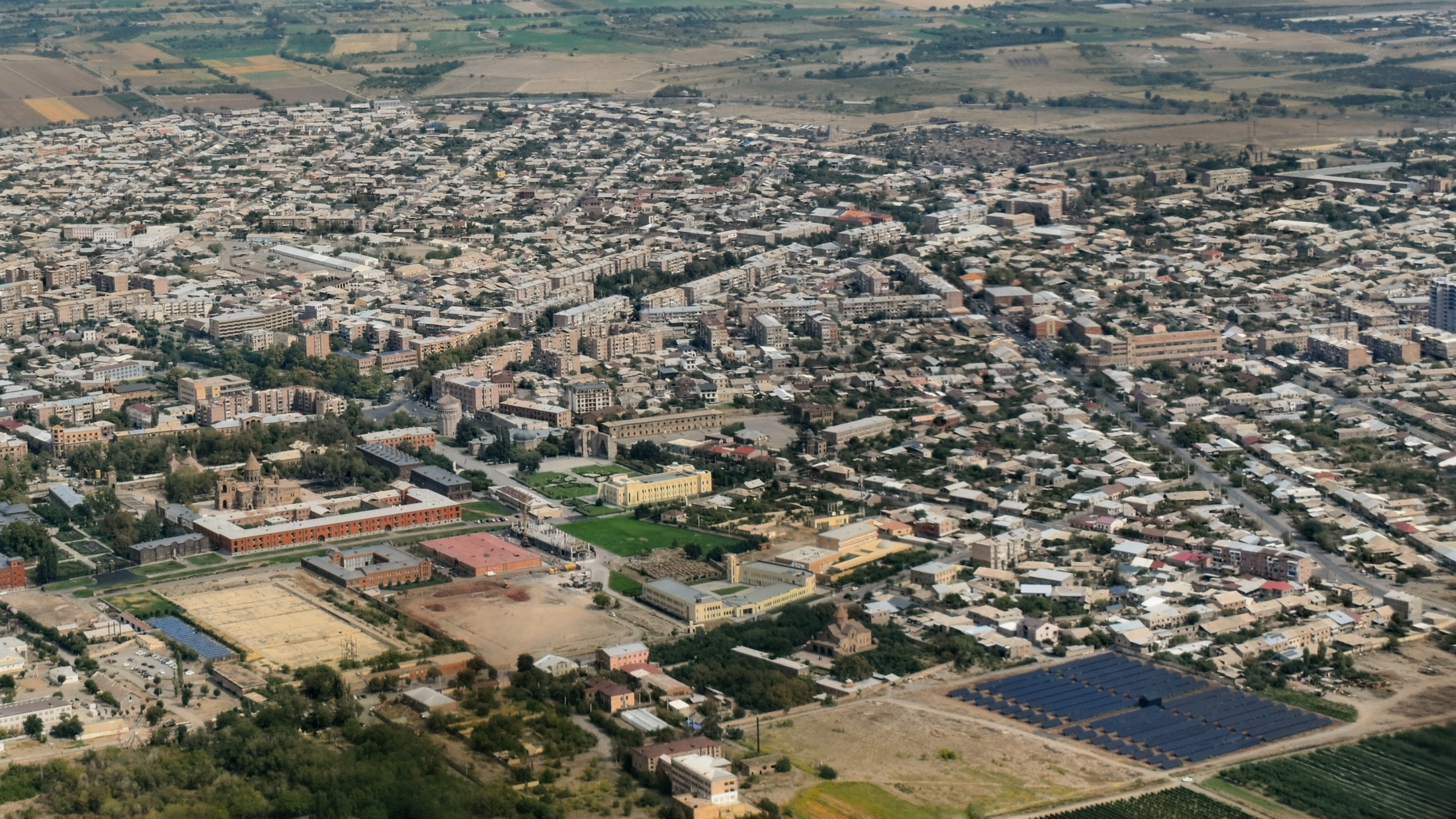
An aerial view Vagharshapat and its churches (see locations marked). Hripsime is on top right corner.

The church and the surrounding area cover an area of 6.2 hectares (15 acres) and is property of the Armenian Apostolic Church (Mother See of Holy Etchmiadzin). Recognized as a national monument by the Soviet Armenian government, this designation was reaffirmed by the government of Armenia in 2002. Joint councils consisting of the Ministry of Culture and the Armenian Apostolic Church are responsible for regulating its conservation, rehabilitation, and usage. In 2000 the UNESCO inscribed St. Hripsime and the four aforementioned churches as a World Heritage Site. It is one of Armenia's most visited monuments and a popular wedding venue, hosting 472 wedding ceremonies and 536 baptisms in 2013. It is often visited by Armenian and foreign dignitaries.

== Background and foundation ==
=== Pre-Christian remains ===
Excavations conducted inside the church in 1958–59 uncovered three black tuff fragments of an ornamented Ionic cornice placed upside down beneath the supporting columns. These fragments were immediately identified as belonging to a pre-Christian Hellenistic structure—possibly a temple—with stylistic similarities to the cornice of the Garni Temple. Some scholars, including Alexander Sahinian, who oversaw the excavations following the initial discovery, argued that the fragments indicate the presence of a pagan temple on the site. (Note: Sahinian, Zhores Khachatryan, Tadevos Hakobyan et al. proposed that the temple was dedicated to Mihr-Apollo, while James R. Russell suggested that it may have been devoted to Anahit. Babken Arakelyan and Hovhannes Khalpakhchian described it more generally as "taken from the ruins of some ancient building" of "Hellenistic character" and as "a building of the Hellenistic period", while Robert G. Ousterhout described the fragments as "reused Roman building components.") Others propose that they came from a pagan building elsewhere in Vagharshapat and were later reused in the church's foundations. Sahinian suggested the fragments must have belonged to "a large, richly sculpted building" and were kept underneath the church "to perpetuate the memory of the victory of Christianity over paganism." The excavated sections were covered with protective glass for public display.

=== Early Christian structures ===
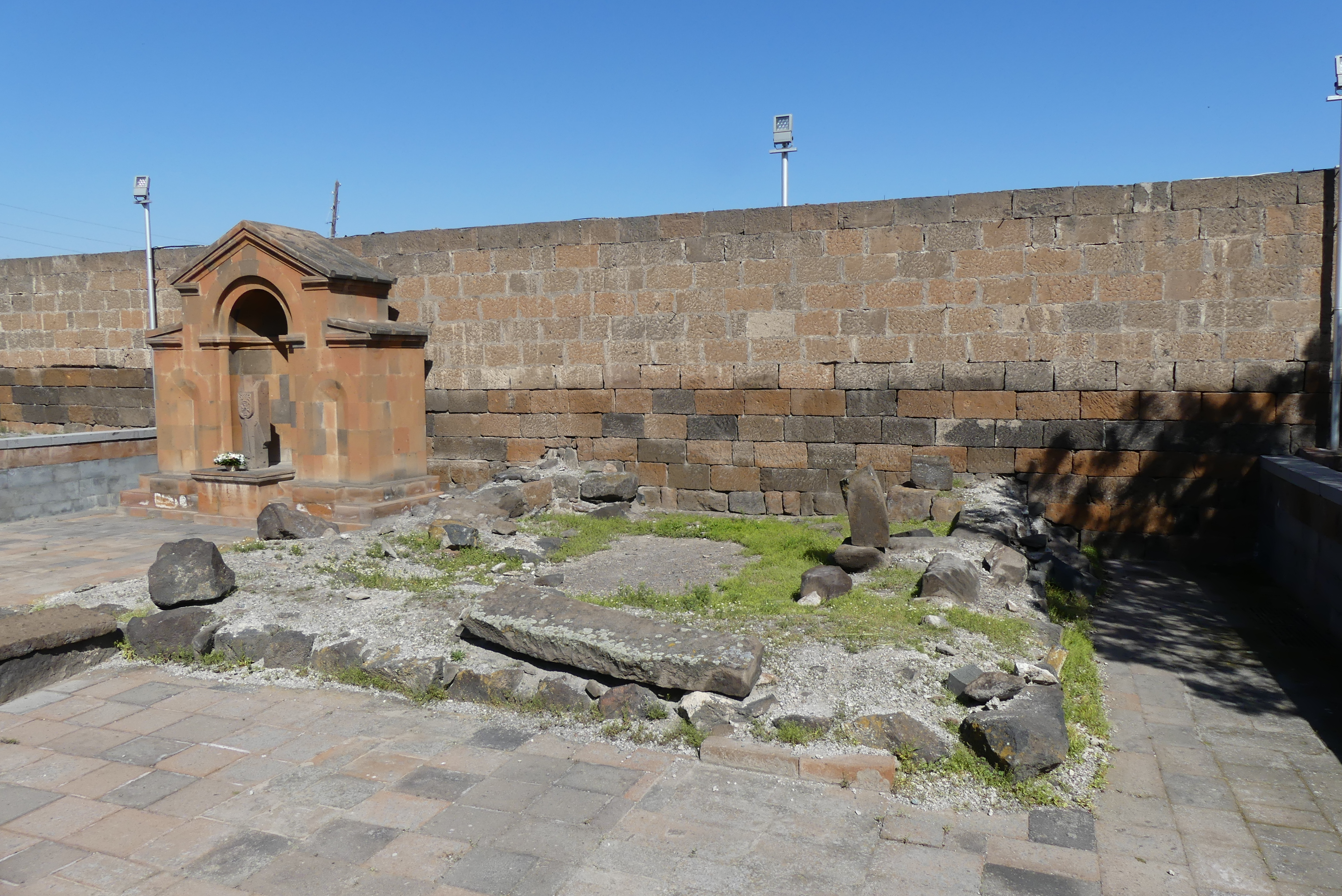
The late 4th century martyrium excavated in the late 1970s

According to the traditional account recorded by Agathangelos, Hripsime, a Roman virgin, and her companions (including Gayane), fled to Armenia to escape persecution by the Roman emperor Diocletian. In Armenia, Hripsime was tortured and killed by king Tiridates III after she rejected his advances. Following Tiridates's conversion to Christianity in the early fourth century (dated 301 or 314 AD), he and Gregory the Illuminator built a martyrium at the site of her martyrdom as an act of remorse. Agathangelos recounts that Gregory and Tiridates buried her in a sarcophagus, while Tiridates brought enormous stones from Mount Ararat to construct the martyriums of Hripsime and companions. Considered one of the earliest Christian martyriums, it is believed to have been partially buried underground, with an aboveground canopy. (Note: A bas-relief sculpture of a two-storied mausoleum, shaped like a tower, that appears on the southern stele at Odzun is believed to depict the martyrium of St. Hripsime. Its general form closely matches the two-story tombs of Palmyra.) Its walls were made of stone, the roof of wood, and tiles used for covering.

The original martyrium was destroyed by Sasanian king Shapur II and his Armenian Zoroastrian ally Meruzhan Artsruni circa 363/364, along with Etchmiadzin Cathedral and other Christian sites. In 395, Catholicos Sahak Partev built a new chapel-martyrium, which the later historian Sebeos described as "too low and dark". Archaeological excavations in 1976–78, led by Raffi Torosyan and Babken Arakelyan, uncovered the foundations of a small single-nave basilica around 10 m (33 ft) east of the current church, which is likely the remains of this late fourth century structure. (Note: Additionally, sarcophagi, pieces of a four-sided stele, winepresses, wells, and water pipes were discovered. The monastery wall, built in 1894, cut through the single-nave church, separating it into two parts. In 1996–97, an open altar-like chapel was erected next to the single-nave church for the proper enshrinement of the relics of the Hripsimean virgins.) Notably, Christian-style burials were also unearthed, which both scholars and the Armenian Church identified as Hripsime and her companions. A letter from The Book of Letters, dated 608, mentions a priest named Samuel of St. Hripsime, indicating that the chapel was an active church at the time.

=== Current church and Komitas's inscriptions ===
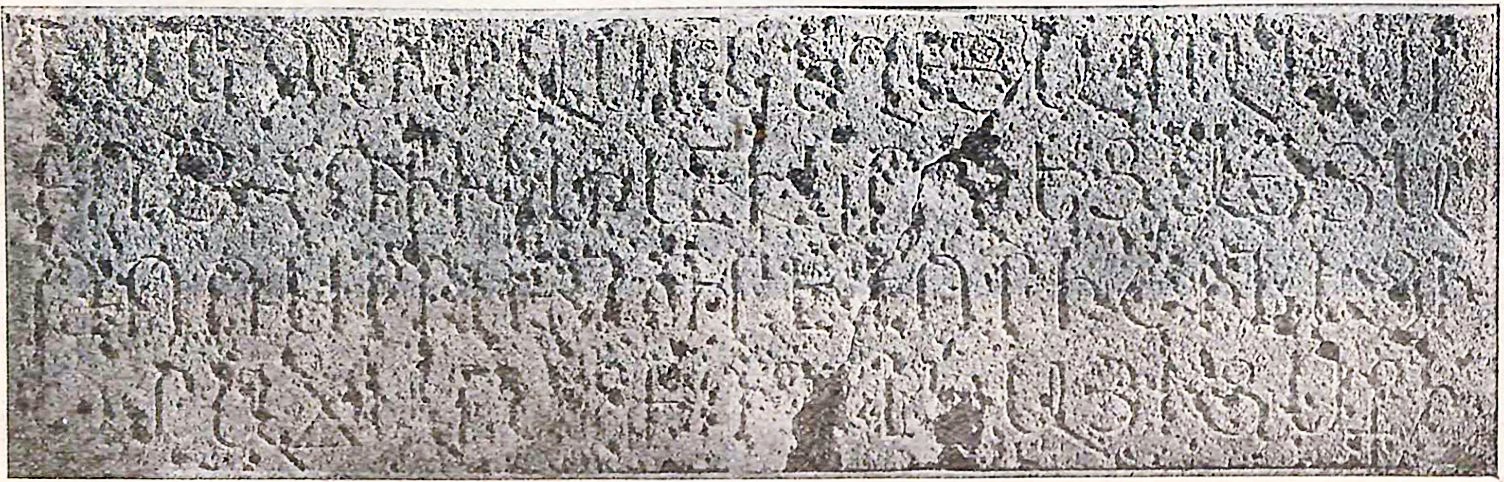
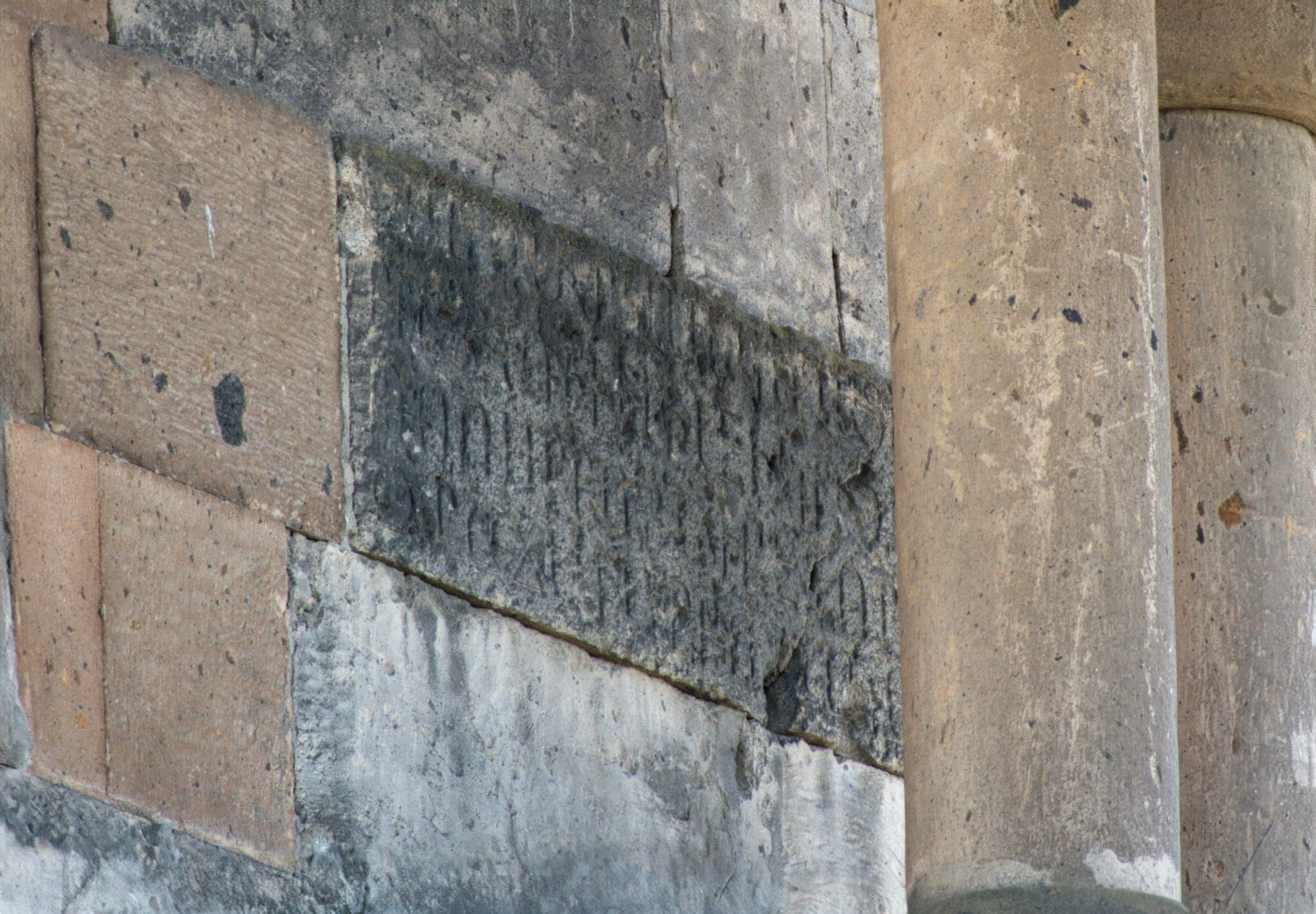
The inscription of Catholicos Komitas on the western façade, photographed by Garegin Hovsepian in 1913. The same inscription as seen from ground level, partly concealed by the belfry.

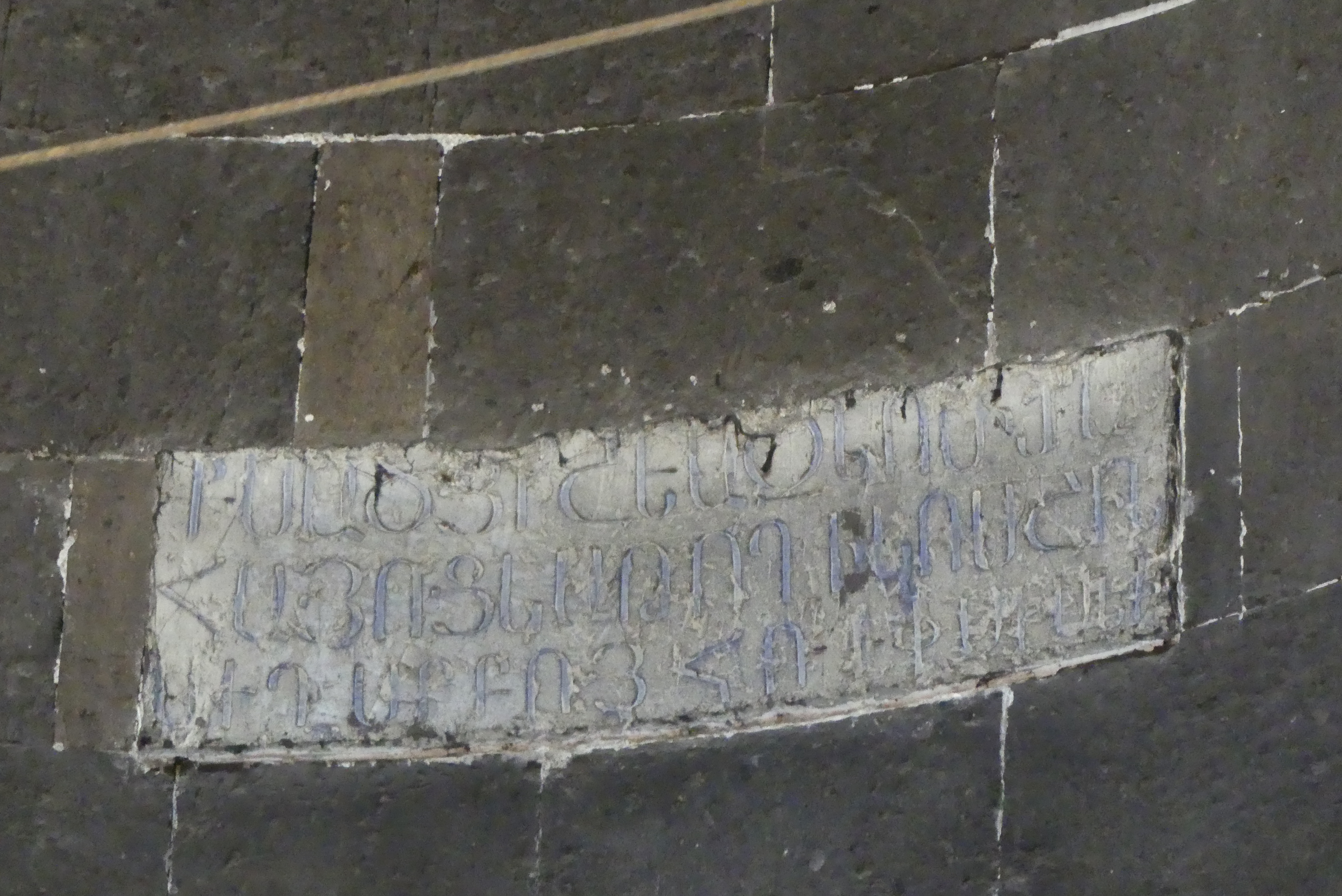
Komitas's second inscription in the apse

The seventh-century historian Sebeos recounts that Catholicos Komitas (r. 615–628) demolished the small martyrium and constructed the present church in the 28th year of the reign of the Sassanian king Khosrow II (r. 590–628), which has been calculated as the year 618, a dating which has been near-unanimously accepted. (Note: Some scholars have placed it circa 618, such as Stone and Kouymjian in 617, Maranci in 618/619, Donabédian "between ca 617 and ca 628." Armen Kazaryan suggested "construction could have taken place between 613 and 620.") Two inscriptions attest to Komitas's role in its construction. A number of scholars maintain that Komitas, also a hymnographer, may have been the architect of the church. Murad Hasratyan suggests that his identification as "builder" in one of the inscriptions indicates that Komitas himself was the architect. One of the most important monuments of medieval Armenia, it represented a "major construction of real artistic significance".

The church contains two engraved inscriptions in the erkat‘agir uncial script recording Catholicos Komitas's role in its construction. (Note: There are two other inscriptions on the western façade which are heavily weathered, with only individual letters legible, which Karo Ghafadaryan and Aleksandra Eremian attributed to Catholicos Komitas.) These inscriptions, conventionally dated to 618 (Note: 616/617) and 628 respectively, are the second oldest known Armenian inscriptions after the Tekor Church inscription (c. 478–490). (Note: The inscriptions of Hripsime are explicitly called the second earliest Armenian inscription by Greenwood, Michael E. Stone, and Arsen Harutyunyan. The Tekor inscription is now lost.)

The first inscription (202 × 60 cm) is located on the western wall's exterior, now largely concealed by the belfry. (Note: Though previously photographed, by Garegin Hovsepian in 1913 and by Nikolai Tokarsky in the early 20th century, it is not easily visible.) Recording Komitas's personal responsibility for the construction, it reads: "I Komitas sacristan of saint Hṙi{w}p‘simē was summoned to the throne of saint Grēgor. I built the temple of these holy martyrs of Christ." (Note: ԵՍ ԿՈՄԻՏԱՍ ԵԿԵՂԵՑԱՊԱՆ ՍՐ / ԲՈՅ ՀՌԻ{Ւ}ՓՍԻՄԷԻ ԿՈՉԵՑԱՅ ՅԱ / ԹՈՌ ՍՐԲՈՅՆ ԳՐԷԳՈՐԻ ՇԻՆԵՑԻ / ԶՏԱՃԱՐ ՍՐԲՈՑ ՎԿԱՅԻՑՍ Ք[ՐԻՍՏՈՍ]Ի)

The second inscription (150 × 35 cm) appears on the eastern apse's interior—behind the altar. (Note: It was likely originally placed on the northern apse and transferred to the eastern apse, an unusual location, when the former was dilapidated.) It was revealed under plaster during restoration works in 1898, when it was lightly damaged. Imploring Christ to recognize Komitas's labors, it reads: "Christ God, remember Komitas kat‘ołikos of Armenia, the builder of saint Hṙip‘simē". (Note: Ք[ՐԻՍՏՈ]Ս Ա[ՍՏՈՒԱ]Ծ ՅԻՇԵԱ ԶԿՈՄԻՏԱՍ ՀԱՅՈՑ ԿԱԹՈՂԻԿՍ ՇԻՆ / ԱՒՂ ՍՐԲՈՅ ՀՌԻՓՍԻՄԵԻ)

== Later history ==
=== Decline and major restoration ===
Not much is known about the church's history in the medieval period. The tenth century Catholicos Hovhannes Draskhanakerttsi described it as a wonderful and splendid structure. Inscriptions indicate that it was intermittently active, including one from 1296 recording the release of the monastery from taxes on cotton by local rulers, and another from 1302 on the lintel of the western entrance recording the donation of 1,000 silver coins.

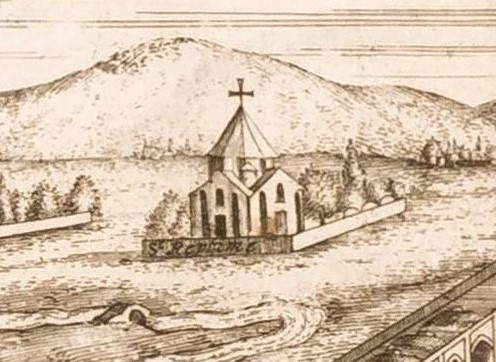
The church on a 17th-century engraving by Guillaume-Joseph Grelot (published 1686) (Note: It was created by Guillaume-Joseph Grelot, according to a 2024 book by Asoghik Karapetian, director of the Etchmiadzin Museums. See still (4:55–5:01) from the book launch. See also 1811 version (full engraving).)

Following the deportation of Armenians to Iran by Shah Abbas in 1604–05, it was "without inhabitants and fences", according to contemporary chronicler Arakel of Tabriz. Abandoned and defenseless, the church was also heavily dilapidated by that time. During periods of neglect, neatly cut facing stones were quarried from the church. Arakel recounted that it had no doors, no altar, the roof and walls had crumbled, and the foundations were shaken and dug up, while the interior was full of manure as livestock were driven into the church. According to Arakel, two Catholic Augustinian missionaries stole Hripsime's relics in 1610, provoking outrage among Armenians. With the help of Shah Abbas I of Persia, the relics were recovered and returned.

The church was restored by Catholicos Pilipos (r. 1633–1655), which is described by Arakel of Tabriz, who wrote that it "took three years, from start to finish, for the work began in the [Armenian] year 1100 (1651) and was finished in the year 1102 (1653) with great expenditures and tremendous labor." (Note: Pilipos's 1653 restoration is also recorded on an inscription on a khachkar embedded into the western façade.) This restoration involved work on the pediments, the roof of the dome, and saw the construction of a porch/portico or an open narthex (gavit) in front of the western entrance (upon which a belfry was added in 1790). (Note: A 1653 dossal (embroidered altar curtain), now held at the History Museum of Armenia, was made in this period. It depicts St. Hripsime and her companions.)

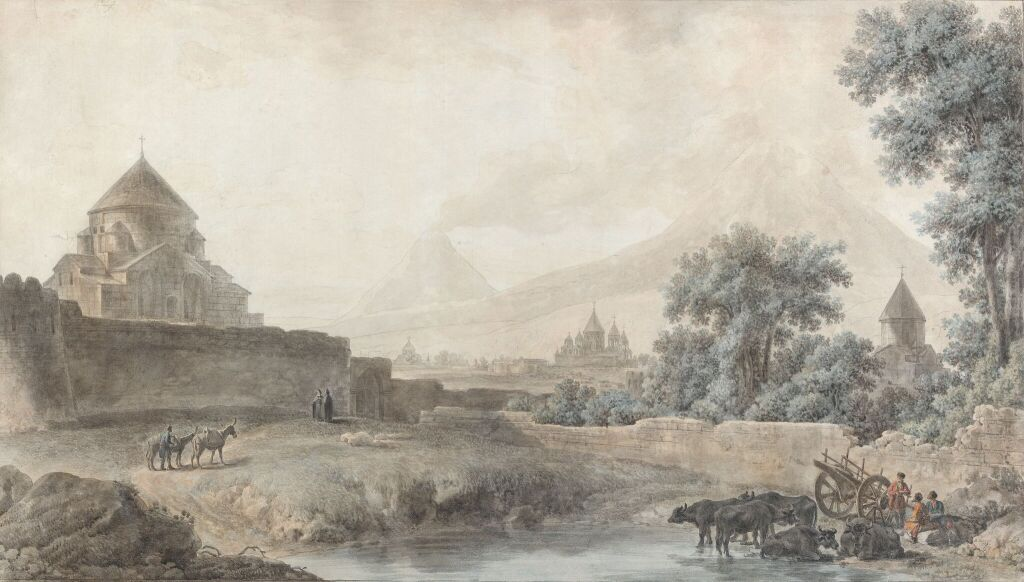
A 1783 watercolor of the churches of Etchmiadzin by Mikhail Matveevich Ivanov. Then recently fortified St. Hripsime, on the upper left, and its architectural details are accurately reproduced.

Since its restoration in 1653, the church had a regular congregation. Subsequent Catholicoi, Eghiazar (r. 1681–1691) and Nahapet (r. 1691–1705), further contributed to its revitalization by adding auxiliary buildings and sponsoring manuscript production. Six inscriptions engraved on its walls in the 1720s record the donations of salt, oil, incense, rice, candles, wine. (Note: There is also an encrypted epigraph from 1721/22, left by future Catholicos Hakob V of Shamakhi (r. 1759–1763), is located on the left niche of the eastern façade. An undated inscription by Aleksandr vardapet, who is most likely the later Catholicos Aleksandr II (r. 1753–55), records the donation of fifty sheep as breeding stock.) In the 17th and 18th centuries, monks at St. Hripsime were provided bread and clothing from the monastery of Echmiadzin, but the monastery also possessed its own farmland and livestock.

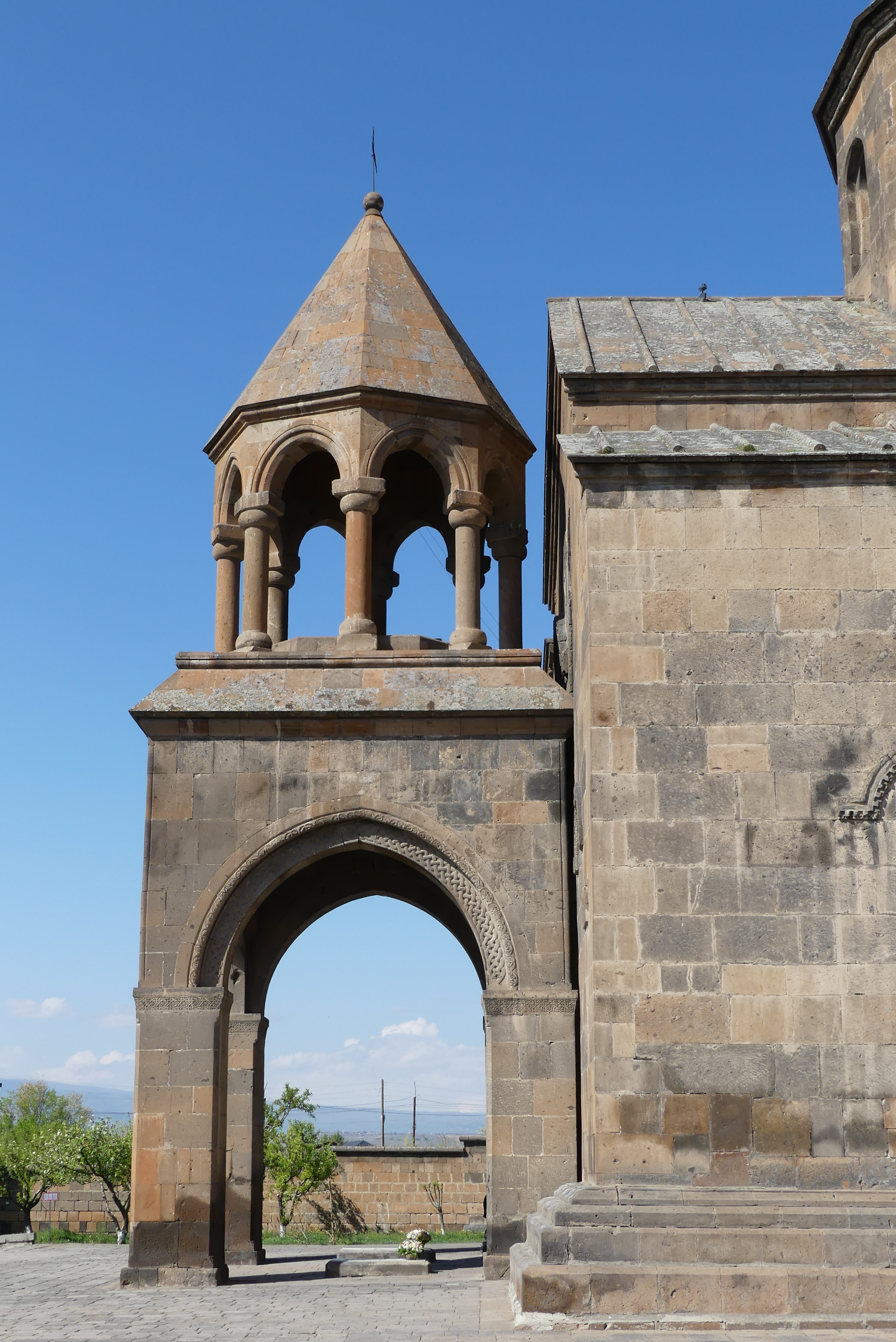
The portico and the belfry, added in 1653 and 1790, respectively.

=== Later additions and renovations ===
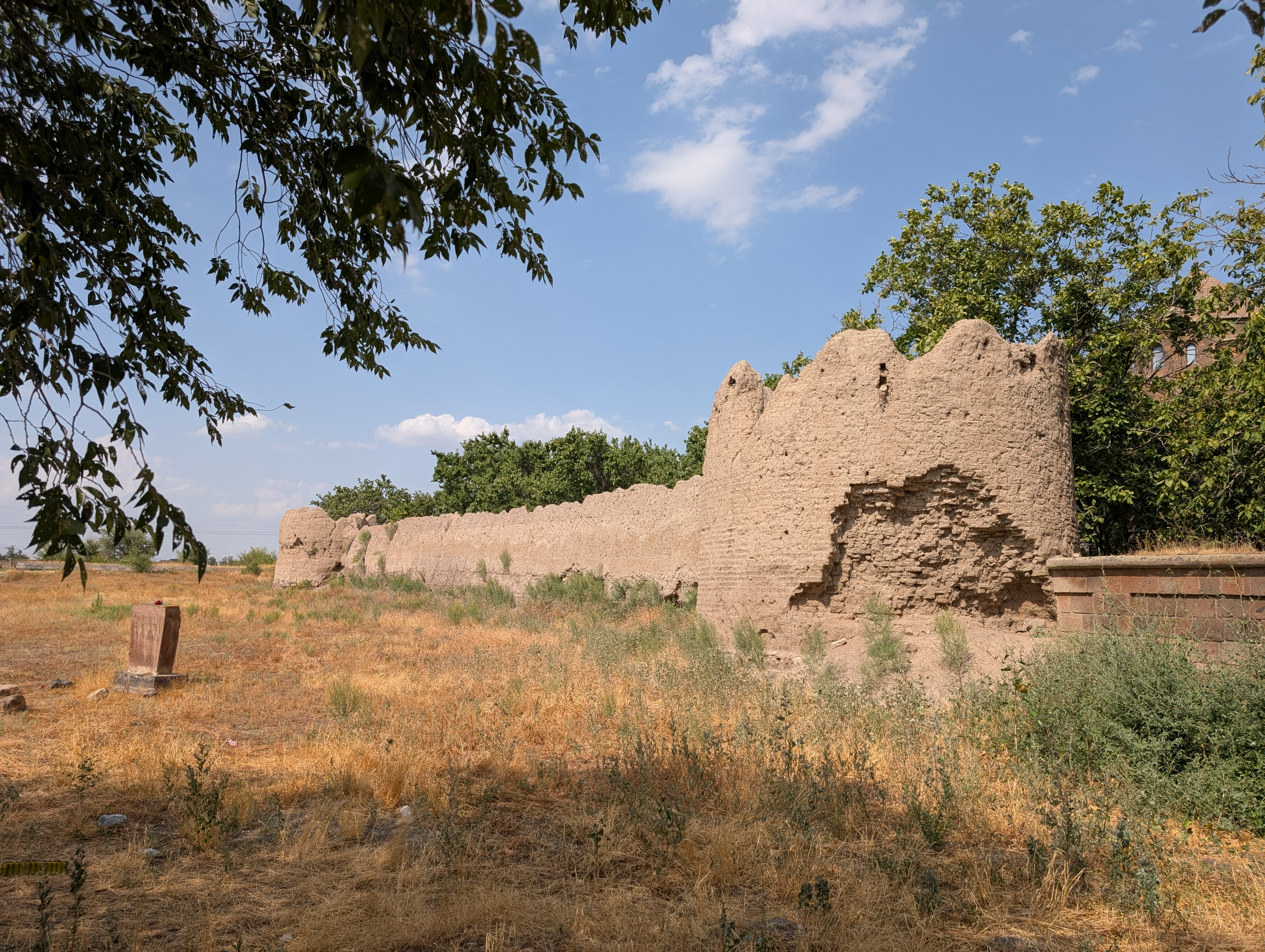
Remnants of the cob walls surrounding the monastery built in 1776

Catholicos Simeon I of Yerevan (r. 1763–1780) raised a new cross on its dome in 1765, and fortified the monastery in 1776 with a cob perimeter-wall, along with corner towers and an arched entrance built out of stone on the northern side. In 1790, Catholicos Ghukas Karnetsi (r. 1780–1799) added a rotunda-shaped belfry on the porch/narthex built by Pilipos in 1653. (Note: Some sources erroneously state that the belfry was built in 1880. An inscription by Catholicos Ghukas definitively dates it to 1790.)

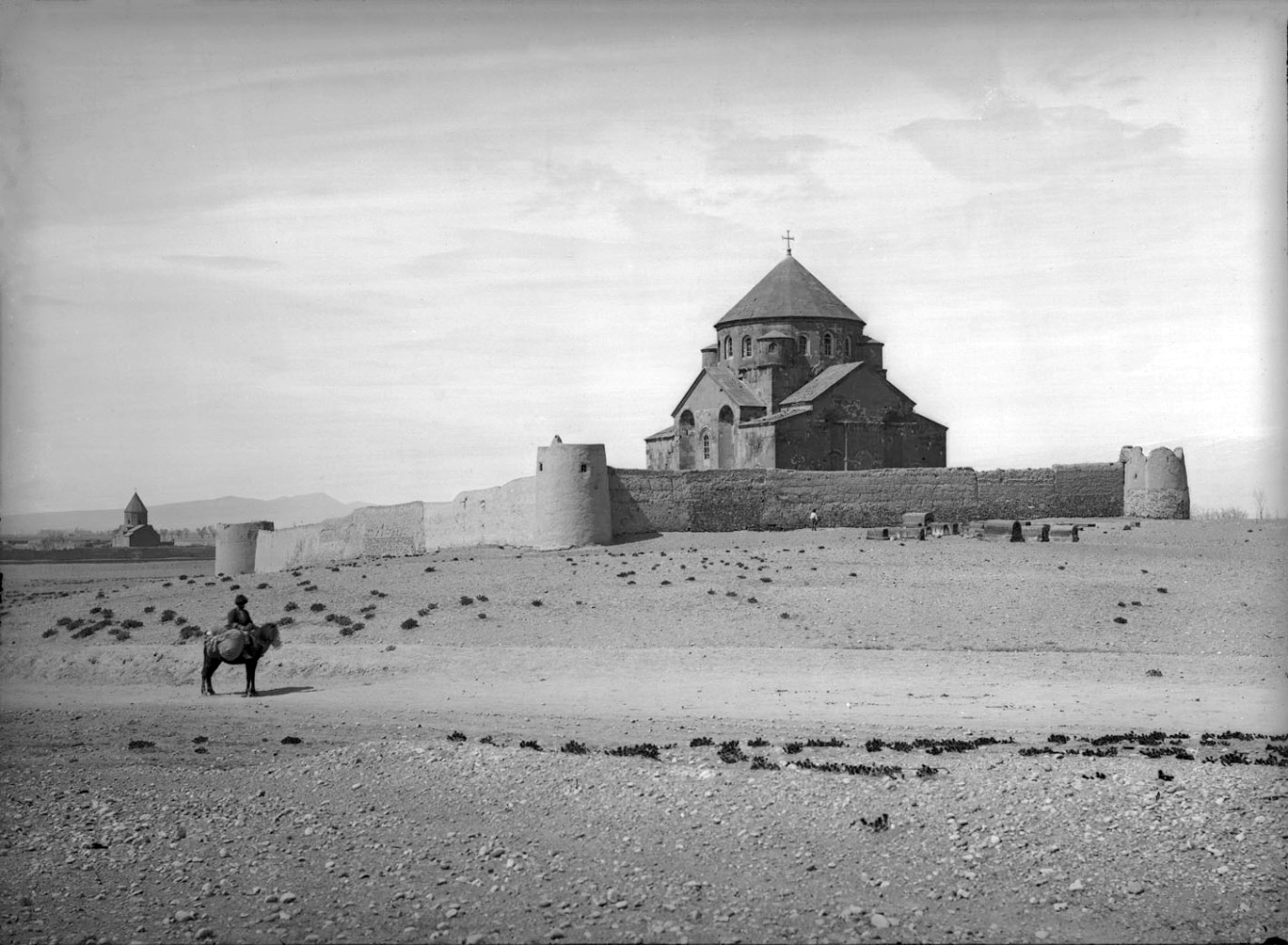
Photo by Ohannes Kurkdjian from the south-east c. 1878. Shoghakat Church is on the far left at a distance.

Under Catholicos Mkrtich Khrimian, in 1894–95, a two-story residence for monks was built inside the monastery walls, and the eastern and southern sections of the cob walls were replaced with stone walls. The church itself underwent considerable renovation in 1898.

=== Early Soviet period ===
A February 1921 decree issued by Ashot Hovhannisian, Soviet Armenia's People's Commissar for Education, nationalized the church and placed it under the Cultural-Historical Institute, but it was returned to the Mother See in January 1922. In 1926, vardapet Khachik Dadyan, abbot of the monastery, undertook independent investigation in its grounds without government authorization leading to his expulsion and imprisonment. Dadyan had excavated around its foundations, causing significant damage by exposing them to rainwater and snow. Part of the facing stones collapsed in 1932. The church remained endangered for a decade until restoration works began in 1936. Its foundations were reinforced and its roof, dome, the monastery walls and buildings were restored and the surrounding area underwent beautification. The restoration was initiated by the architect Alexander Tamanian, and was supervised by the archeologist Karo Ghafadaryan.

The church was (re)nationalized by the early 1930s and it, along with adjacent buildings, were transformed into a repository of antiquities called the Vagharshapat Archaeological Museum. After its restoration, the church itself was turned into a museum in 1936 housing diverse archaeological exhibits from the nearby Zvartnots Cathedral, including an Urartian inscription, (Note: An inscription of Rusa II discovered near Zvartnots.) jars from Karmir Blur, two Ionic capitals from the Garni Temple, frescoes from the demolished Sts. Peter and Paul Church in Yerevan, stone inscriptions and fragments, clay vessels, and photographs. The museum, also described as a lapidarium, operated for nearly a decade. The church and monastery were returned to the Mother See in the spring of 1945 after locum tenens Catholicos Gevorg Chorekchyan's April 1945 appeal to Joseph Stalin. Its collection of more than 110 items were transferred mostly to the History Museum of Armenia. Its living quarters were used by the accommodation department of the town council and the militsiya as late as 1951.

=== Restorations and revitalization ===
Extensive restoration and archaeological excavations were undertaken at the church in the early years of Catholicos Vazgen I's tenure (r. 1955–1994), alongside similar efforts at Etchmiadzin Cathedral. Vazgen I, who called it "the most magnificent of our ancient shrines," directed much efforts for its revitalization. Restoration began in 1955 and concluded in 1962, with reconsecration held in September 1962. Unlike other historic churches restored under state auspices, this project was overseen by the Church (Note: The restoration works were overseen by a committee comprising Mikayel Mazmanyan, Varazdat Harutyunyan, Rafayel Israyelyan, Konstantine Hovhannisyan, Karo Ghafadaryan.) and funded by Italian-Armenian benefactors Onnik Manoukian and Yervant Hussisian, who contributed $15,000 (equivalent to $172,000 in 2025) for the church and an additional $6,000 (equivalent to $65,000 in 2025) for the surrounding walls.

The church grounds were enhanced with tuff block paving and a basalt drinking fountain designed by architect Rafayel Israyelian. Israyelian also designed a new altar table (1960) and chandelier (1967). The altar featured an altarpiece of the Virgin Mary by Hovhannes Minasyan, which has been hailed as "one of the finest works in the history of Armenian painting."

In 1958, restoration shifted to the interior, beginning with the removal of white plaster and limewater deposits through sandblasting. This revealed the original dark grey-brown tuff walls and a system of eight large and sixteen small squinches beneath the circular drum. Excavations in 1959 exposed the original floor, located about 40 cm (16 in) below the contemporary level, (Note: Varazdat Harutyunyan wrote that it was known beforehand that the floor had been raised nearly 1 m (3 ft 3 in), perhaps during the 1653 restoration of Catholicos Pilipos.) which was then lowered to match the original elevation. By the 1970s, St. Hripsime was one of six active abbacies in Soviet Armenia. Further restoration took place in 1985, including the belfry's renovation in 1986–87 by Artsrun Galikyan and Avetik Teknetchyan. Galikyan also designed new wooden doors for the church.

Following independence, the Armenian government returned 3 hectares (7.4 acres) of land surrounding the monastery to the Mother See in the mid-1990s, while legal ownership of the church building was transferred in July 2000.

Under Catholicos Karekin I (r. 1995–99), philanthropist Louise Manoogian Simone sponsored the renovation of the roof and complete repaving of the surrounding grounds by 1997. A new baptismal font was consecrated in 2012, and its 1400th anniversary was celebrated in 2018.

== Crypt and other burials ==
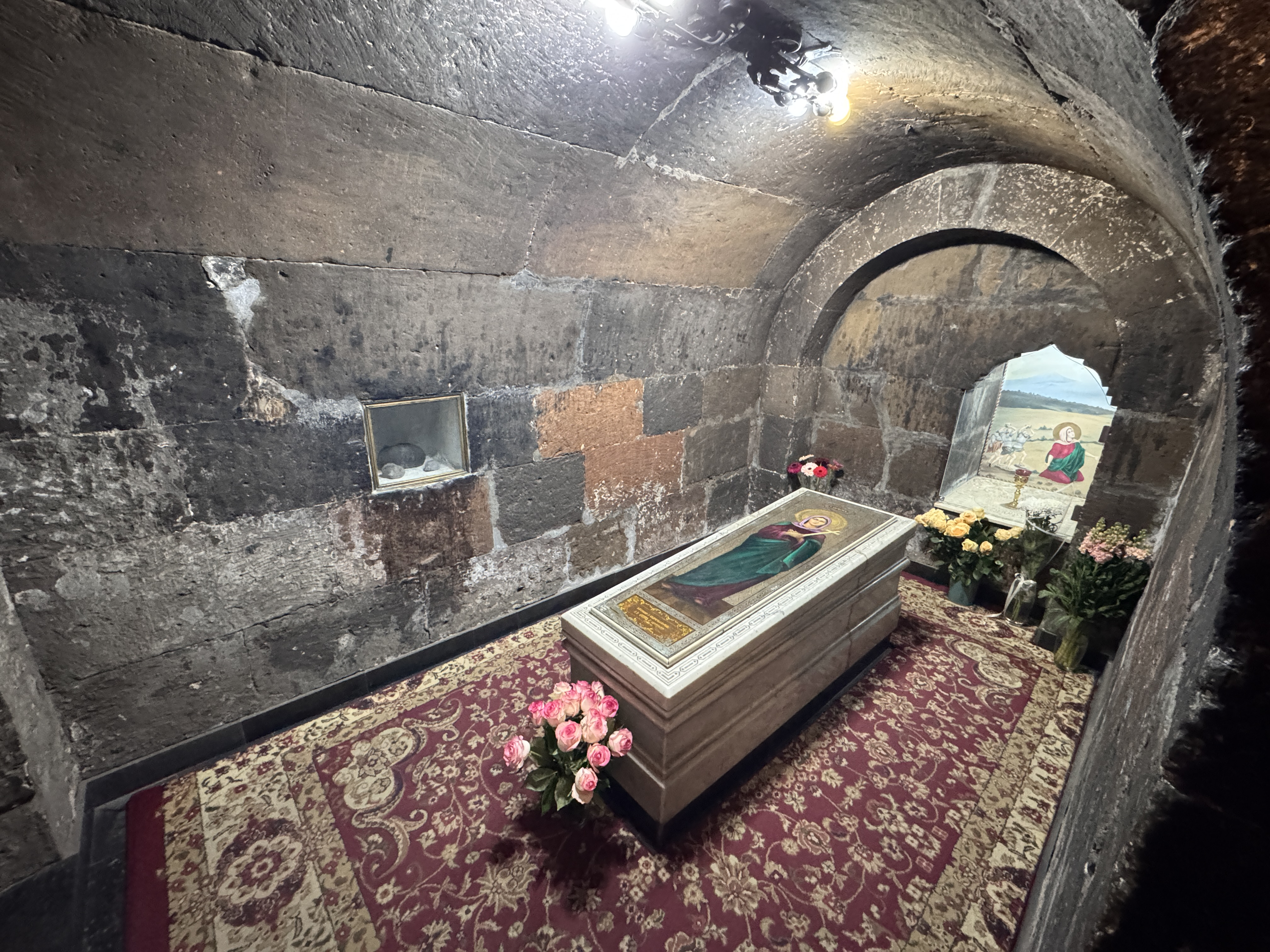
The tomb of St. Hripsime

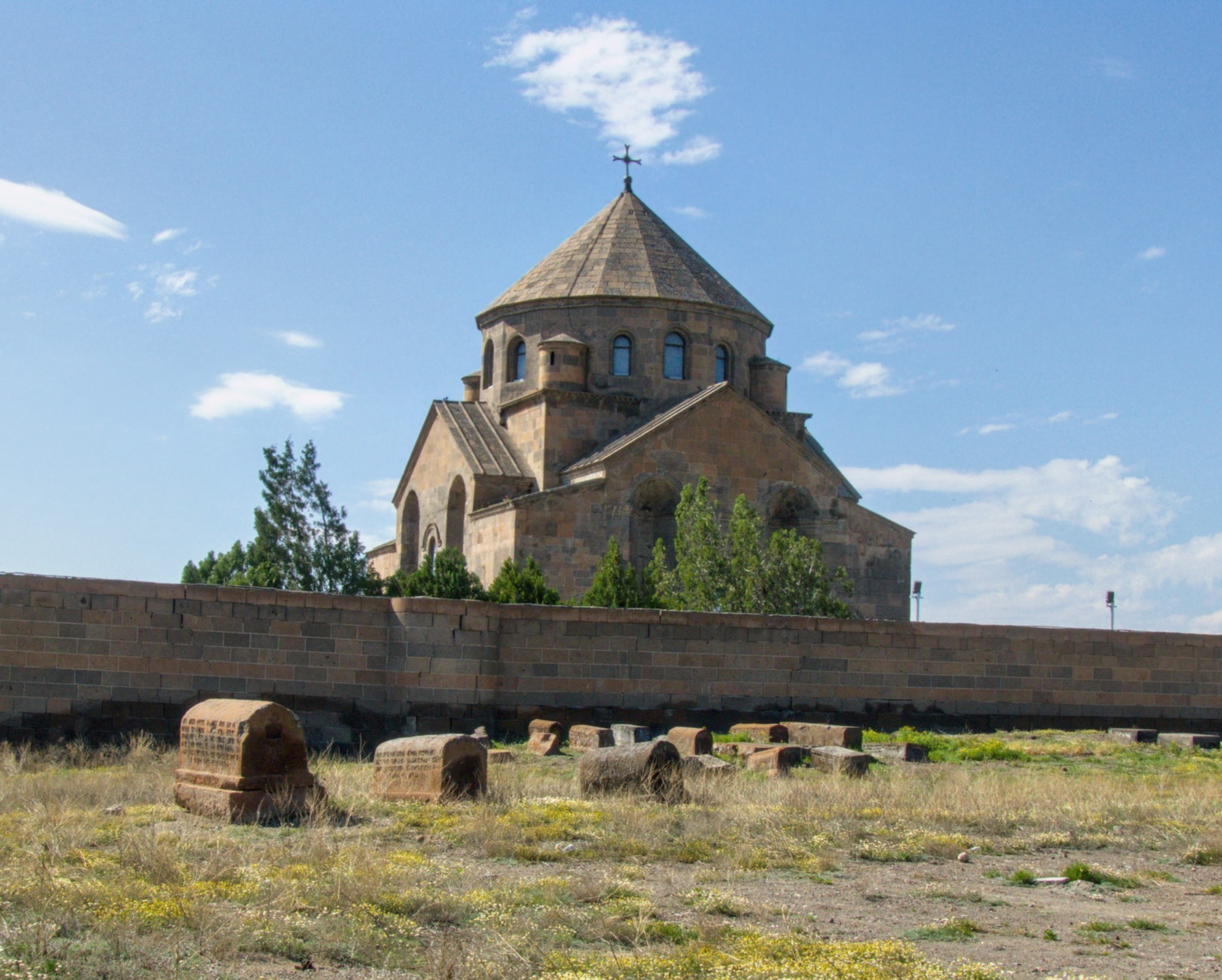
The monastic cemetery outside its walls

The tomb of St. Hripsime is located in an underground barrel vaulted chamber under the eastern apse. It is accessed through the chamber on the northeastern corner. Scholars like Eremian and Mnatsakanian have dated the crypt to the early fifth century. Mathews suggested that it "appears integral to the seventh century church". Maranci linked its architecture to the building practice found in both Constantinople and particularly in Palestine. The current gravestone, dating to 1986, depicts Hripsime holding a cross.

Catholicos Komitas was presumably buried inside the church. A stone slab before the altar is thought to be his tombstone. Catholicos Pilipos, who restored the church in 1653, was buried in the northern apse inside the church after refusal by the Iranian ruler of Erivan to permit his burial at Etchmiadzin. His marble tombstone was erected by Catholicos Yeprem I in the early 1800s. Another Catholicos, Khoren I Muradbekian, who was murdered by the NKVD in April 1938, had a "hasty burial in the ordinary graveyard" of St. Hripsime, but his body was exhumed in 1943 and lain to rest in the grave of the catholicoses at Saint Gayane.

During restoration works in 1958–59, two graves were found outside the western entrance, where, according to historical accounts, two Catholicoi had been buried: Astvatsatur (r. 1715–1725) and Karapet II (r. 1726–1729). Their tombstones had disappeared in the early 1800s, and new marble ones were erected during the 1950s restoration. To the east of the church, a cemetery has survived with around 50 tombstones, including 30 with inscriptions, dating from the 17th to the 19th centuries. The perimeter wall, built in the 1890s, divides it into two. One notable burial is vardapet Stepanos Lehatsi (d. 1689), a member of the Etchmiadzin brotherhood.

== Architecture ==
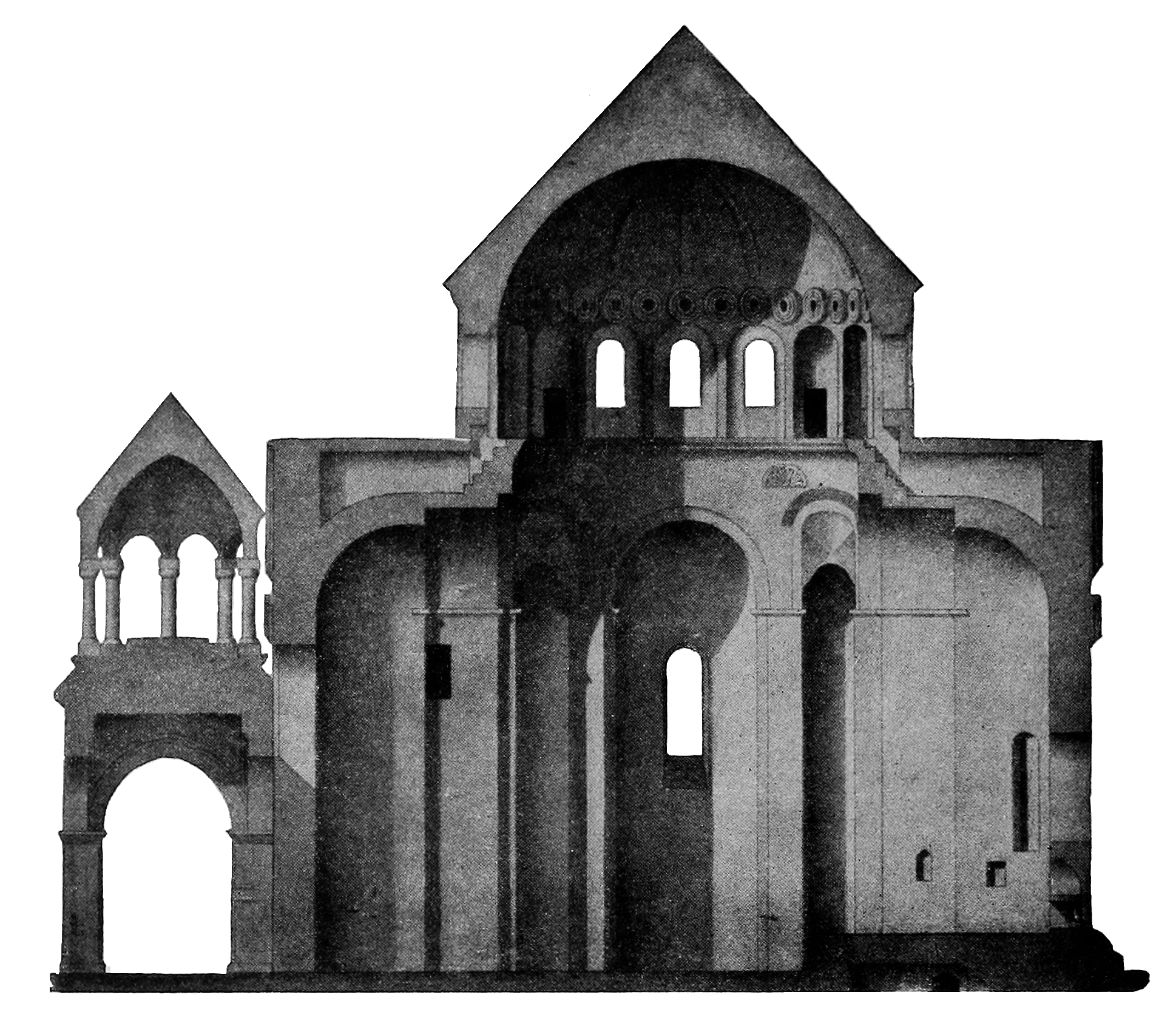
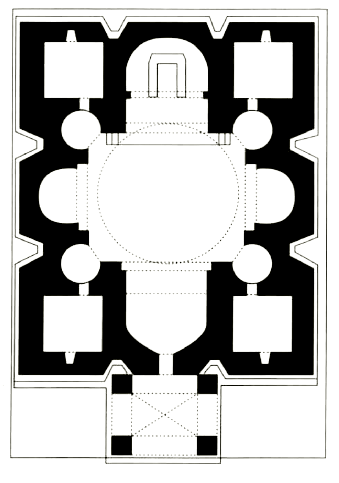
Cross section and ground plan per Toros Toramanian

St. Hripsime stands as one of Armenian architecture's most refined achievements. The church exemplifies the "inscribed tetraconch" type distinctive to Armenia and Georgia. (Note: Also described as a domed tetraconch encased in a rectangle and a tetraconch with corner niches.) It was built during the first golden age of Armenian architecture in the seventh century, when the tradition was leading the entire Christian East.

=== Durability and modifications ===
The church has remained largely unaltered throughout history and is considered "excellently preserved," especially its interior. Main modifications include changes to the original roof angles and tiled spherical roof on the dome, and removal of grand portals. Its overall proportions have remained largely unchanged. The most significant later additions were the portico (1653) and the belfry (1790), which have been frequently criticized on aesthetic grounds. (Note: H. F. B. Lynch advised to disregard the portal and belfry when appreciating its architecture. Ghafadaryan argued that the belfry only diminishes the church's external appearance. Artsvin Grigoryan and Nona Stepanyan wrote that the belfry is out of harmony with the church.)

The building has not sustained any major damage from earthquakes. (Note: A 2023 study identified a vertical crack between a niche and corner room, likely from moderate earthquakes, but not threatening structural integrity.) Its seismic resistance has been attributed by a group of researchers to the use of 110 cm (43 in) thick three-layer unreinforced wall of "midis masonry" (two outer faces of cut stone with the interior filled with rubble and lime mortar). Additionally, its pyramidal shape and low center of gravity contribute to its stability, along with earthquake-resistant features like wall-reinforcing niches, a lightweight hollow dome crown, fan-shaped squinches to support a dome, buttresses, reinforcing ribs, and integral anti-seismic corner towers (turrets).

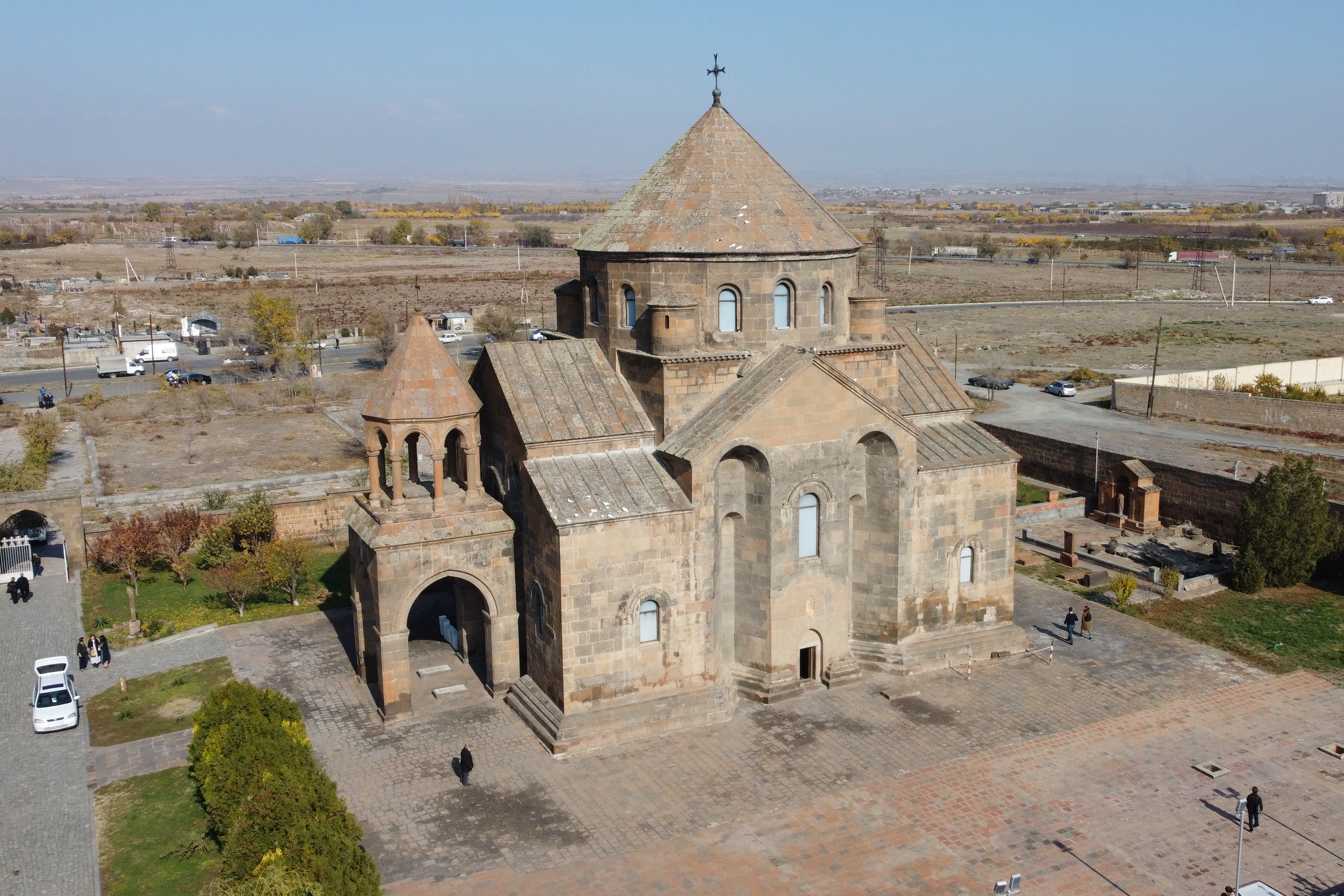
An aerial view of the church

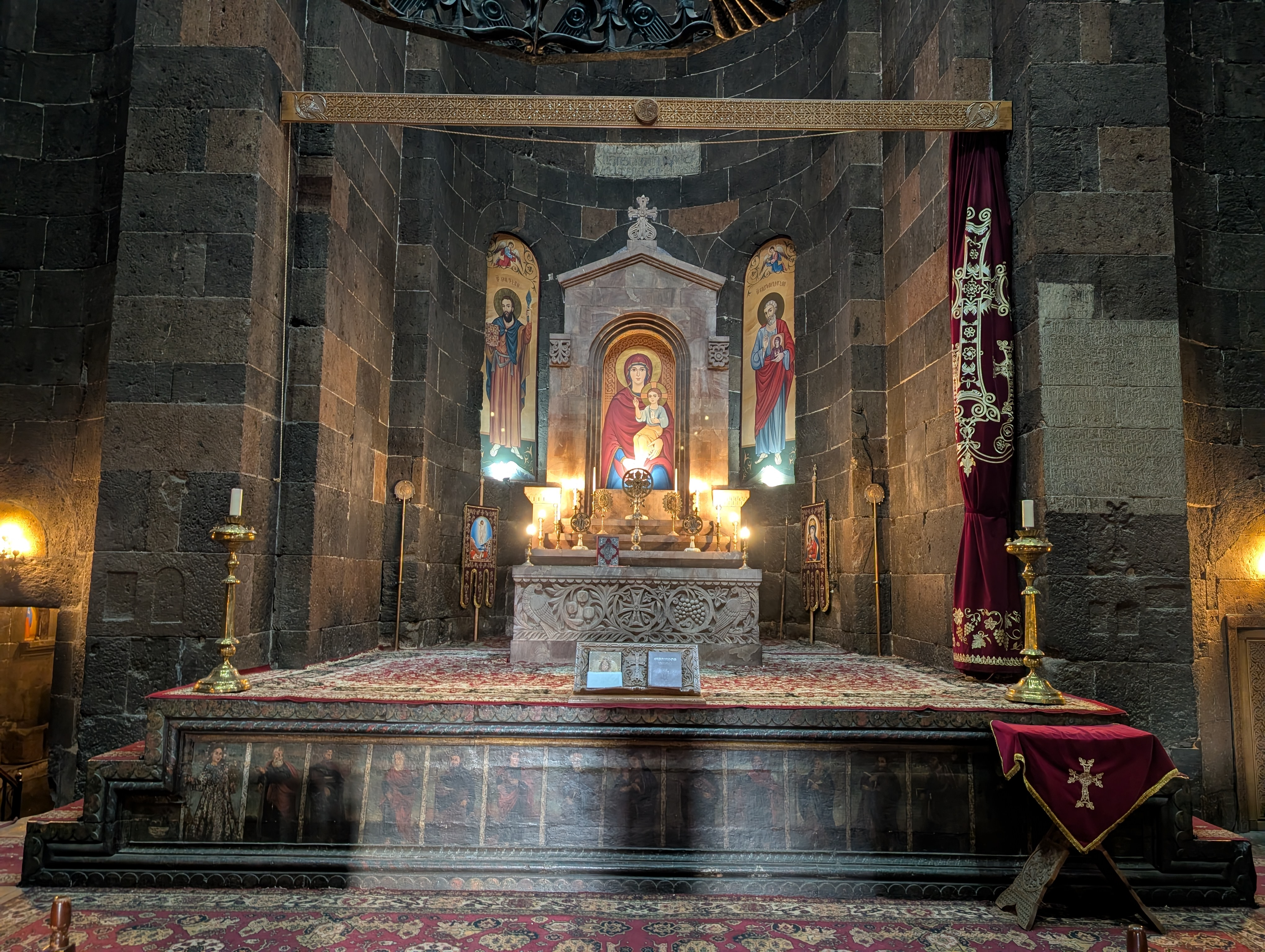
An interior view

=== Overview and façade niches ===
Constructed with finely cut dark gray tuff stone, the church features precise ashlar masonry with mortarless joints and rests on a solid three-stepped stylobate. It has two entrances, located on the western and southern sides. It is externally rectangular with a cruciform tetraconch plan. Its core is an octagonal bay, from which four cross arms terminate by apses, while in the diagonals three-quarter cylindrical passageways in diagonal directions leading to four identical chambers (sacristies), each measuring 4 m × 4 m (13 ft × 13 ft).

The church measures 22.8 by 17.7 m (75 by 58 ft) externally and rises around 23 m (75 ft) internally under the dome and 32 m (105 ft) to the top of the cross. Although small in size, (Note: Krautheimer compared its size to the church of Tomarza in Cappadocia and noted that it covers just about one third the surface of the Hagia Sophia at Salonica.) it possesses "a massive monumentality", standing out distinctly against the plain. With a "thick and squat" exterior appearance, its interior is "undulating", spacious, well lit, "very sober and very graceful". Its southern wall is 53 cm (21 in) longer than the northern (22.87 and 22.34 m). The dimensions and positions of windows, doors, apses, and niches vary throughout the church, which can be explained by successive building phases. The apse originally had a single window, while two more windows were added, according to Eremian, by Catholicos Ezr after 632 as he subscribed to the Chalcedonian creed under Byzantine pressure under Heraclius to symbolize the Trinity. The two openings were sealed off at a later point, possibly around 680. Jean-Michel Thierry found the evidence decisive, while Mathews disagreed.

It is unique for the deep and tall trapezoidal (Note: Also described as triangular or wedge-shaped.) niches on its four façades. They serve both practical and aesthetic purposes: conserving building materials while relieving wall weight, and creating visual contrast with the polished wall surfaces that enhances the overall harmony of the structure. They create a "powerful visual impact," adding chiaroscuro effects. These niches (recesses) represented an architectural innovation and constitute "the first dated example of dihedral niches" (Note: Donabédian: "here, for their first appearance, these niches are trapezoidal and not completely dihedral.") that would later find a wide application and become characteristic for Armenian architecture. H. F. B. Lynch found their execution at Hripsime "quite inchoate", suggesting that these niches found perfection at Ani.

=== Ornamentation ===
The church features minimal ornamentation. On the exterior, decoration is primarily limited to sculpted moldings (i.e. carved arched friezes) over the windows, stylized with floral and geometric motifs. Inside, simple thirty-two medallions (i.e. rosettes) composed of concentric circles run along the drum of the dome. More notably, the cupola contains twelve elongated relief rays radiating from the center and narrowing towards the top center. Loosely grouped into four groups, they form a cross-like pattern. Despite a lack of direct resemblance this design has been linked to the mosaic cross originally depicted on the dome of the Hagia Sophia in Constantinople, as well as to sun motifs in Sasanian architecture, such as those on the dome of the Neyasar fire temple. The architect may have drawn inspiration from decorative elements in Iranian domes, reinterpreting them to align with Christian theology. Beneath the dome, fan-shaped decorations accentuate the three-quarter niches.

=== Dome and squinches ===
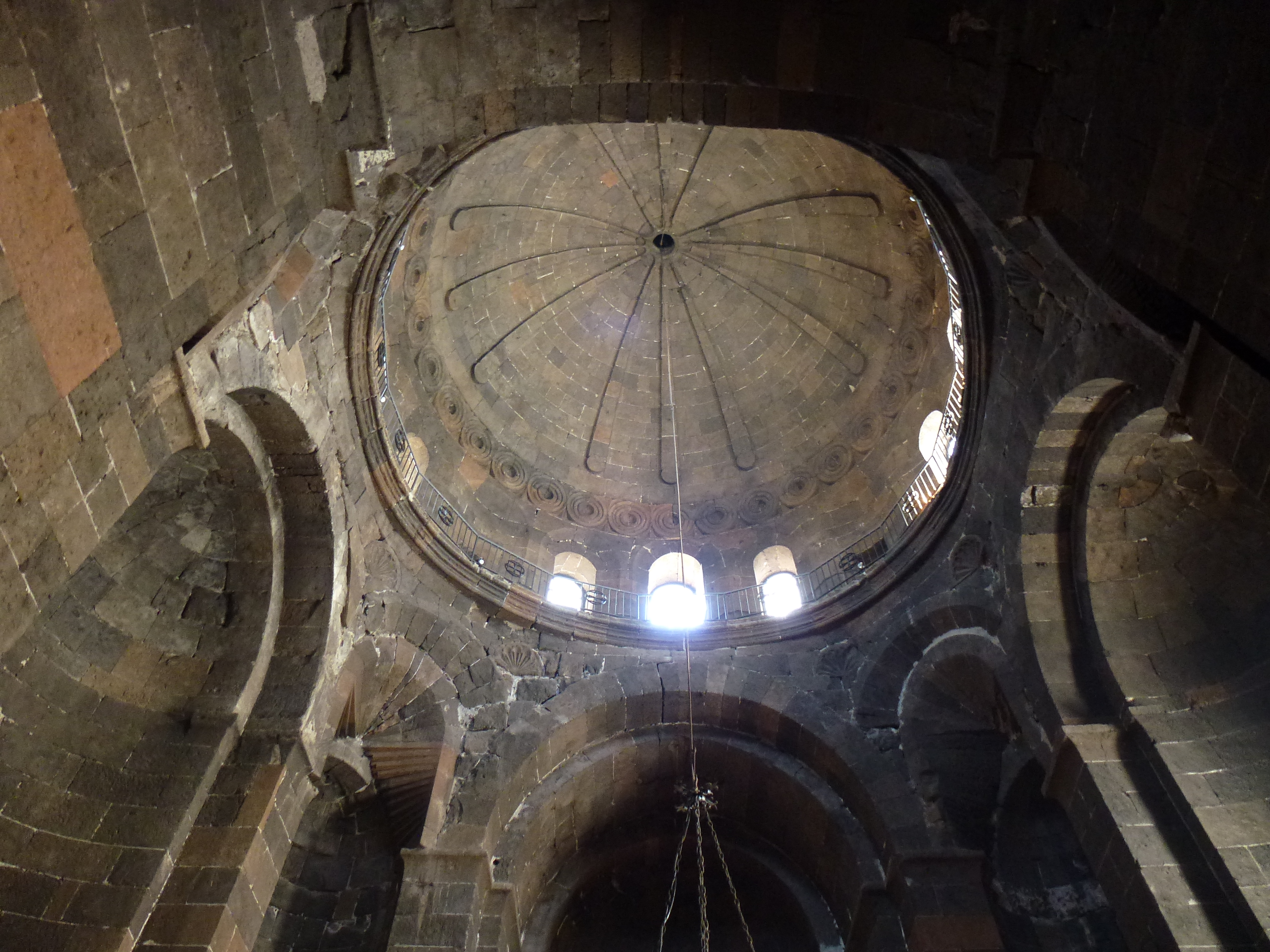
Interior view of the cupola and squinches

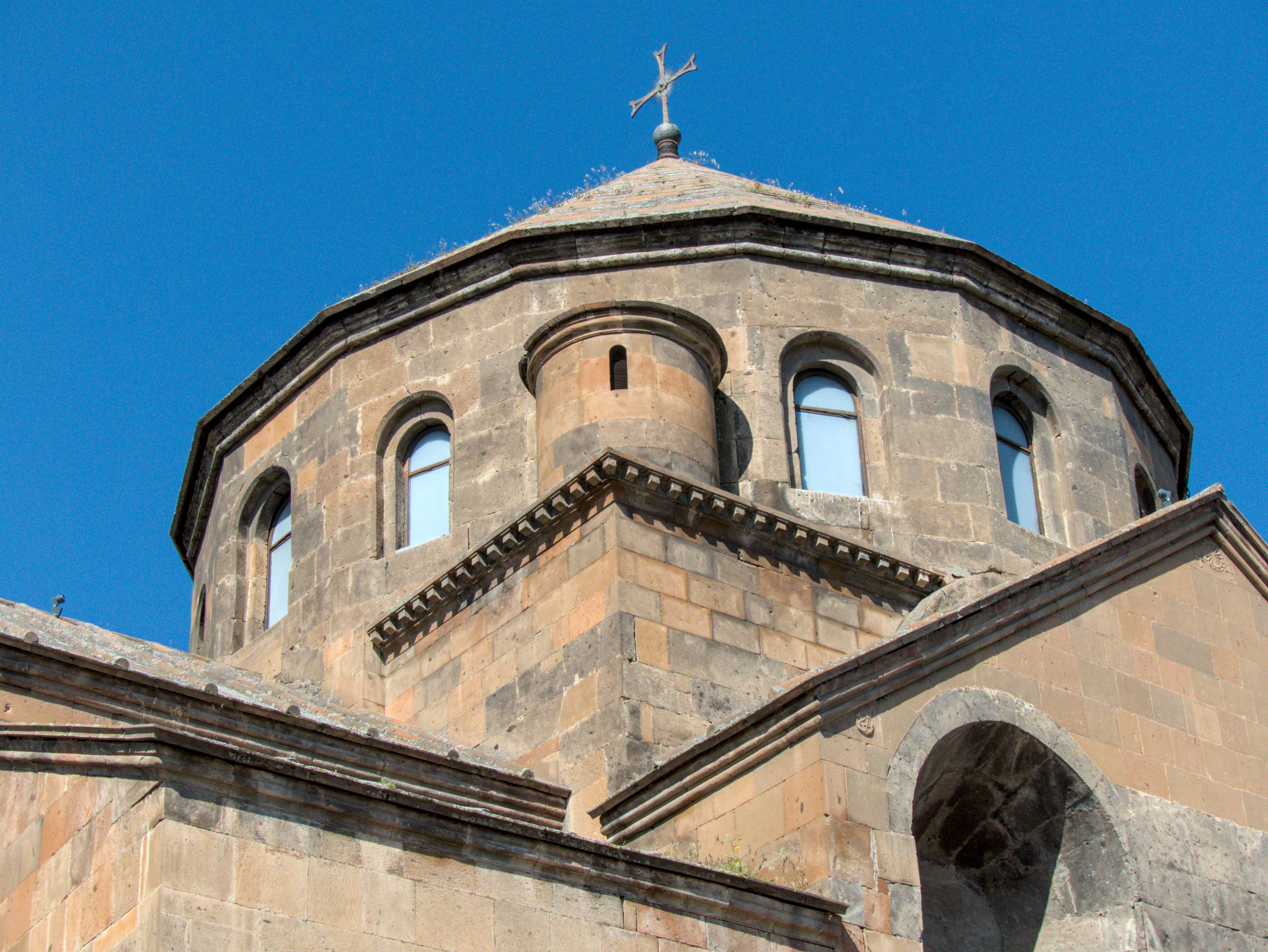
The dome and one of the four corner turrets

The dome rests on a slightly rectangular bay of 10.10 m × 9.52 m (33.1 ft × 31.2 ft), topped by a conical roof on a low, sixteen-faceted drum with twelve windows. It is unusually large for the size of the church. The conical apex contains an interior hollow that keeps the center of gravity low to resist earthquake damage.

Its cupola, which places a windowed drum on a circular cornice to emphasize the structure's vertical thrust, proved to be an enduring architectural innovation and the church's most significant feature in the development of Armenian architecture.

The drum's four corner sections contain small round turrets placed at the cubical base. Thomas F. Mathews describes them as "an unicum in Armenian architecture." Thierry insisted that they are "certainly not original" (do not date to the seventh century). They are hollow and provide access from the cornice walk-way to crawl space above the squinch vaults. They reinforce the dome's weakest points, transferring the stresses arising from it to the building's main supports. They function as stabilizing counterweights for the drum, and restrain lateral thrust, serving as both anchors and buttresses. Visually, the turrets create a transition between the polygonal dome and rectangular base and emphasize its scale.

Based on irregularities in measurement, scholars initially attributed the cupola to the 10th–11th centuries. However, restoration in the 1950s revealed mason's marks identical to those in the body of the church, indicating seventh-century origin. Supporting this dating are decorative rays emanating from the cupola's center and a band of concentric circles at its base, features found in other contemporary churches. The stone processing, color, dimensions, row heights, also corresponded to the other parts of the church, leaving no suspicions about later modifications. Harutyunyan theorized that only external dome restoration occurred in the 1650s, while Mnatsakanian suggested the original dome had a spherical, tiled roof. Thierry continued to insist that both the dome and drum date from the 17th century or even later.

The dome rests on four large squinches—arch-shaped supports in the corners of the square bay—over diagonal exedrae, with eight smaller squinches above creating the transition from octagon to circular drum base. These conical squinches have no known precedent in earlier precisely-dated structures in Armenia. Some scholars connect them to Sasanian architecture, citing precedents like Neyasar's chahartaq fire-temple and arguing that Armenians transformed Iranian mud brick prototypes into enduring masonry. Maranci countered that Iranian examples (Sarvistan and Firuzabad) show only superficial resemblance and use different construction techniques (horizontal brick courses vs. Armenian wedge-shaped stone blocks). Instead, Cappadocian churches—particularly Kizil Kilise—provide far more compelling parallels in terms of structural design, construction methods, decorative elements, and scale.

== Type and influence ==
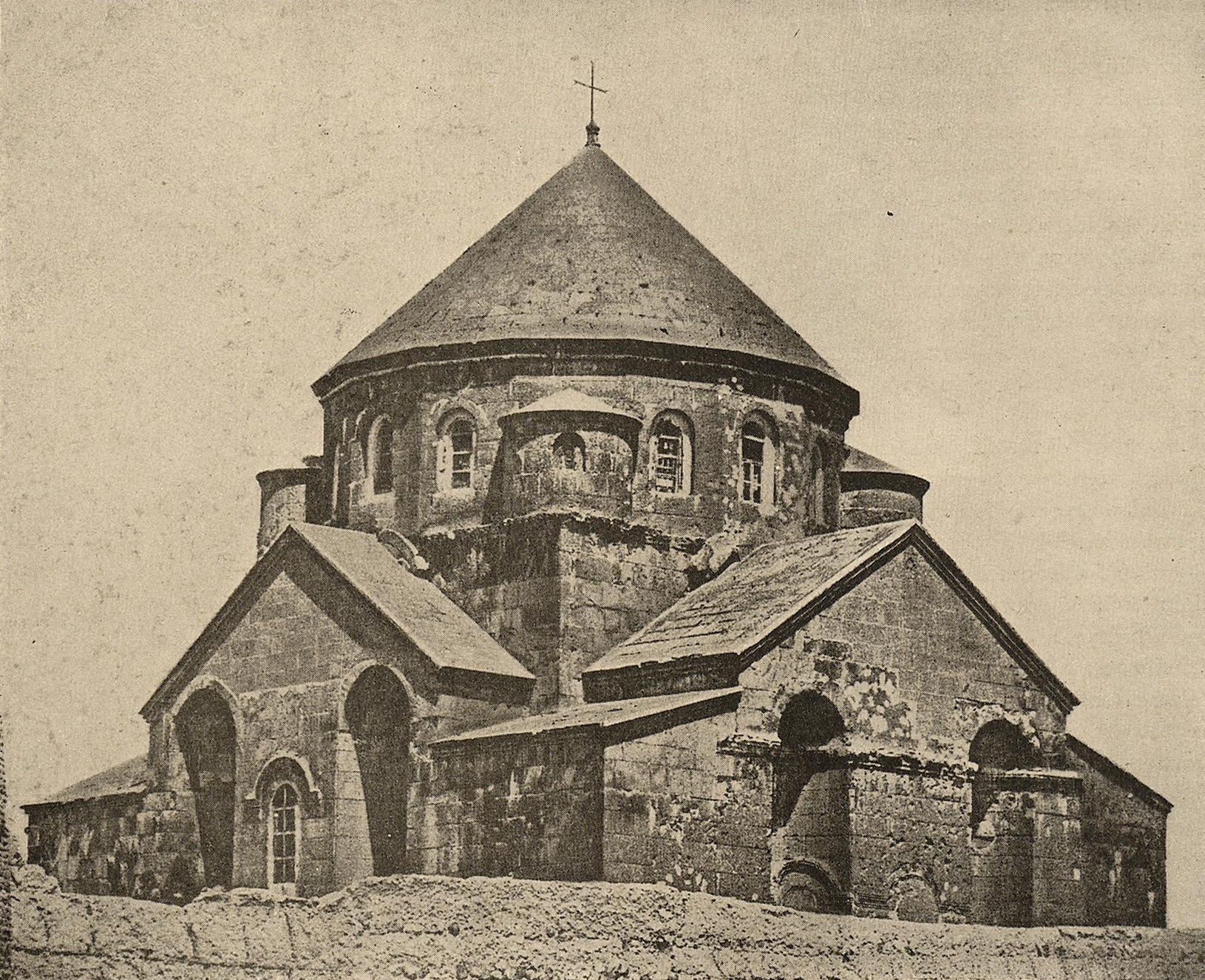
A 1911 photo of the church

Its specific tetraconch ground plan, often called "Hripsime-type", is shared by a group of churches in Armenia and Georgia. The most important examples are St. Hripsime and Jvari in Mtskheta, with the Church of Avan (590s) being the earliest dated example and model for Hripsime. Antony Eastmond describes their forms as "sophisticated plays on geometry and spatial volumes that sought to reconcile the circularity of a central dome within a rectilinear ground plan." Adriano Alpago-Novello noted that the type is "significant for the wealth and articulation of its interior spaces", contrasting with "a very elementary exterior structure."

The church plan/type has often been described as the most distinctively Armenian (or Caucasian). Other significant churches with similar plan and design in Armenia include Garnahovit, Artsvaber (Arcuaber), Soradir (Zoradir), Targmanchats, Sisian, Aramus. (Note: Jean-Michel Thierry classified Hripsime as a tetraconch with corner niches incised with 4 chambers and identified the following churches as also belonging to that subgroup: Garnahovit, Artsvaber, Sisian, and Kolatak.) In Georgia, it is also reproduced in Ateni, Dzveli Shuamta, and Martvili. In the 10th and 11th centuries, its design was revived in the Cathedral of Aghtamar, the Church of the Holy Apostles in Ani, and the main churches at Varagavank and Gndevank. Mnatsakanian suggested that churches of the type were generally built by and for Armenian Catholicoses.

While the question of precedence has been debated by Georgian and Armenian scholars, they are part of a complex process of mutual influence and interchange and a shared cultural heritage. Karen Balyan described the churches of Hripsime and Jvari as "works of genius" and dismissed the scholarly dispute over their "typological primacy" as narrow-mindedness. Edith Neubauer described Hripsime and Jvari as "classically perfected endpoints of a centuries-long development in both countries". Similarly, Mnatsakanian sees the type as a fully resolved stage of a particular direction in early medieval Armenian architecture, leaving no room for further development or variation.

=== Origin ===
The origins (or precedents) of the architectural design of St. Hripsime, regarded as extremely complicated, have been the subject of research. Some have emphasized indigenous development. W. Eugene Kleinbauer characterized it "an independent phenomenon" within Early Christian architecture, marked by its own typological and stylistic trajectory. He wrote that it is "almost universally recognized as a specifically Armenian creation, largely independent of architectural developments elsewhere, including Byzantium." Links to early Christian martyria and baptisteries have been suggested. Richard Krautheimer regarded the church as a product of Armenia's distinctive political, religious, and cultural milieu, dismissing comparisons to Roman mausolea. Adriano Alpago-Novello rejected hypotheses that seek the origins in small Roman temples or in now-lost Constantinopolitan examples, suggesting that arguments based primarily on ground-plan similarities are methodologically unsound. Hovhannes Khalpakhchian proposed that its conception may derive from the vernacular glkhatun, a traditional domestic dwelling form. Some Armenian scholars identify the sixth-century Okht Drni Church in Mokhrenes, Nagorno-Karabakh (Artsakh), with its quatrefoil plan, as a plausible prototype for the Hripsime-type group. Jean-Michel Thierry was not convinced.

Other interpretations situate the monument within broader currents. Annegret Plontke-Lüning pointed to affinities with late antique architecture in Asia Minor, Syria, and Palestine, suggesting a shared lineage with Middle Byzantine cross-domed churches. Marvin Trachtenberg linked the plan to antique and Byzantine polygonal structures, though he highlighted the distinct spatial effect of St. Hripsime—an interior he described as "cramped, fragmented, inert," as if carved from a dense mass. Armen Kazaryan argued that Hripsime exemplifies the integration of Byzantine architectural principles within Caucasian building traditions. While employing local construction techniques, it combines traditional compositional concepts with elements borrowed from Byzantine prototypes, most notably Hagia Sophia in Constantinople.

=== Influence ===
Architecture historians have discussed St. Hripsime's influence on Byzantine architecture, namely as a prototype for the vaulting methods of octagon domed churches of the 11th century, specifically the use of squinches. Notable examples include St. George of Mangana and Panagia Kamariotissa in Chalke (in and near Constantinople), Holy Apostles and Panagia Lykodemou in Athens, Daphni near Athens, Hosios Loukas in Central Greece, Nea Moni in Chios, and several in Cyprus (such as Antiphonetes). Grigory N. Logvin suggested that it spread to Kievan Rus', as seen in the now-destroyed Church of the Theotokos of Blachernae at Klov in Kyiv.

Khalpakhchian suggested that the "simplicity and clarity of its design, restrained forms, and spatial organization of the interior had a decisive influence on all subsequent development of Armenian architecture." In the modern period, it has served as an inspiration, to varying degrees, for the design of numerous Armenian diaspora churches. (Note: Examples include: St. Mary Church in Yettem, California (1946); Church of Our Saviour in Worcester, Massachusetts (1952); St. Gregory Church in Springfield, Massachusetts (1968); St. Hagop (Saint-Jacques) Church in Troinex, near Geneva, Switzerland (1969); St. Paul Church in Fresno, California (1979); St. Gregory the Illuminator Church, Tehran, Iran (1983); Holy Trinity Church in Toronto, Canada (1987); St. Sarkis Church in Krasnoyarsk, Russia (2003); St. Apkar Church in Scottsdale, Arizona (2009); St. Garabed Church in Rancho Mirage, Riverside County, California (2012); St. John Garabed Church in Del Mar, California (2021)) Prominent examples are St. Hripsime Church in Yalta, Crimea (1917), the Armenian Catholic Cathedral of Sts. Elias and Gregory the Illuminator in Beirut, Lebanon (1958), and St. Vartan Cathedral in Manhattan, New York (1968). St. Sarkis Church in the Dallas suburb of Carrollton, Texas (2022) is constructed to "the precise scale and proportions" of St. Hripsime. Its influence has extended beyond Armenian tradition, serving as a model for the Eastern Orthodox St. Paul the Apostle Church in Las Vegas, Nevada (1995).

In Soviet Armenia, its façade niches were evoked in the design of the Matenadaran (1945–58) and Saint Sarkis Church in Yerevan, reconstructed in 1971–76. Its interior found a secular echo in the monumental pedestal of Mother Armenia (1950), which houses a military museum.

== Reception ==
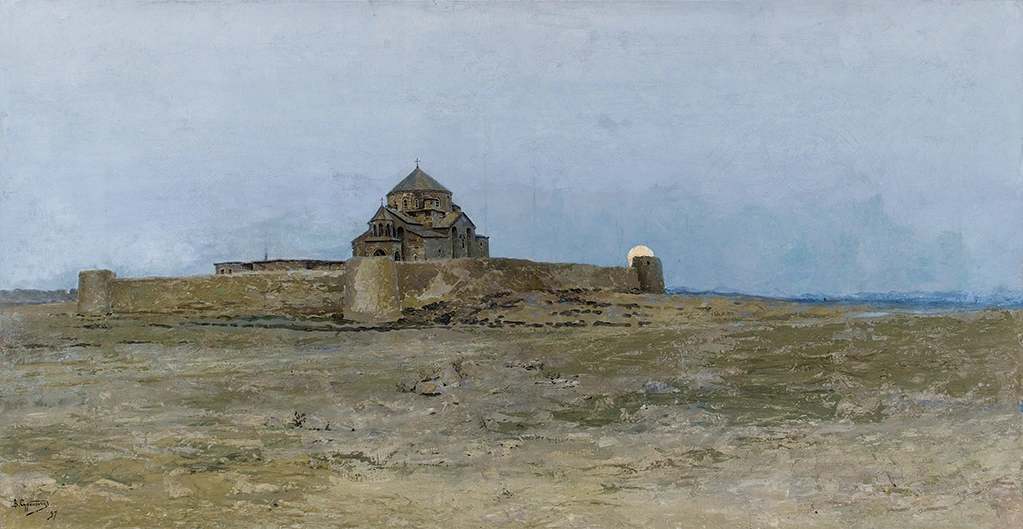
Vardges Sureniants' 1897 painting depicts the church dominating a desolate landscape, symbolizing Armenia's ravaged homeland while venerating its monuments.

St. Hripsime is celebrated as a masterpiece of Armenian architecture, often regarded as the definitive example of the tradition. (Note: Charles Diehl, 1907: "can be considered the masterpiece of Armenian architecture due to its distinctive features." Harold Buxton, 1914: "[the most] perfect specimen of the best age of Armenian architecture." Maya Nersisyan, 1970: "the crown of Armenian architecture". Ivan Foletti, 2023: "the flagship monument of Armenian culture.") The 20th century Catholicos Vazgen I called it "the most magnificent of our ancient shrines", while architecture historian Hovhannes Khalpakhchian deemed it "the pearl of Armenian architecture".

Its architectural ingenuity has drawn international recognition. W. Eugene Kleinbauer placed its "exciting composition" on par with the Basilica of San Vitale in Ravenna, Italy, while Josef Krawina ranked it alongside San Vitale and Hagia Sophia among the great masterpieces of early Christian architecture. More broadly, the type exemplified by St. Hripsime has been described as "a major achievement of medieval architecture" by Anatoly Yakobson and "an exceptional development" by Ernst Badstübner.

The church's proportions have drawn particular admiration. (Note: "The proportions both of the interior and the exterior of this church give an impression of balance and harmony seldom equalled" "harmonious proportions." "These buildings [of the Hripsime type] are also distinguished by their well-refined proportions." "displays noble proportions," "the harmony of its vertical, horizontal and curved lines is so enticing to the eye that the observer stares at them for a long time in enjoyment of the grandeur." "well-formed proportions". Andrei Bely commended "the elegance of its simultaneously heavy and light" proportions.) Frédéric DuBois de Montperreux, an early European visitor, identified its "simplicity, massiveness, and grandeur" as key elements of the Armenian style. Its sculptural quality has been frequently noted, with Marvin Trachtenberg suggesting that it appears "as if carved from one massive masonry block." Soviet Armenian architects Artsvin Grigoryan and Martin Tovmasyan suggested that its design "maximizes the potential of stone". Giorgi Chubinashvili, pointing to its "irregular contour" and other "defects," rejected calling it a masterpiece.

== Artistic depictions ==
The church has been frequently depicted by Armenian and foreign artists. (Note: Armenian painters include Panos Terlemezian (1903), Yeghishe Tadevosyan (1913), Vardges Sureniants (1918), Pavel Shillingovsky (1925), Martiros Saryan (1945), Ara Bekaryan (1960s, 1978), Levon Nalbandyan (1981), Gastello Gasparyan (1984). Non-Armenian: Grigory Gagarin (1847).) Early artistic depictions include an engraving by Guillaume-Joseph Grelot (1686) for Jean Chardin's travelogue and a drawing on a map by Eremia Chelebi (1691). A 1783 watercolor by Mikhail Matveevich Ivanov shows a faithful reproduction of its architecture. An 1897 landscape painting by Vardges Sureniants has been acclaimed by critics for its historical symbolism. In contrast, Martiros Saryan's 1945 painting depicts the church in a vibrant palette, reflecting post-war Soviet optimism.

The church appears on other media, including a 20th-century floor mosaic inside the Chapel of Saint Helena at Jerusalem's Church of the Holy Sepulchre, and postage stamps of Vatican City (1973), the Soviet Union (1988), and Armenia (2000, 2009, 2018). It was depicted on the 200 Armenian dram banknotes in circulation from 1993 to 2004.

== See also ==
- Armenian church architecture
- Medieval architecture

== Bibliography ==
=== Journal articles ===
- Donabédian, Patrick (2023). "Culmination of a late antique legacy? The Golden age of Armenian architecture in the seventh century". CONVIVIUM Supplementum. Brepols: 24–41. ISSN 2336-3452. (archived PDF)
- Eastmond, Antony (2 January 2023). "Art on the Edge: The Church of the Holy Cross, Jvari, Georgia". The Art Bulletin. 105 (1): 64–92. doi:10.1080/00043079.2022.2109388.
- Eremian, Aleksandra [in Armenian] (1974). Հայաստանի V-VII դդ. գմբեթավոր կառույցների նախագծման սկզբունքների մասին [On the principles of designs of 5th–7th century domed structures in Armenia]. Lraber Hasarakakan Gitutyunneri (in Armenian). 10 (10): 56–82. (archived PDF)
- Greenwood, Timothy (2004). "A Corpus of Early Medieval Armenian Inscriptions". Dumbarton Oaks Papers. 58: 27–91. doi:10.2307/3591380. ISSN 0070-7546. JSTOR 3591380.
- Harutyunyan, Varazdat (1984b). "Պատմություն Ս. Էջմիածնի Մայր Աթոռի շինարարական գործունեության Ամենայն Հայոց Կաթողիկոս Վազգեն Առաջինի գահակալության օրոք (1956–1980). Վերանորոգման և բարեփոխման աշխատանքներ Ս. Հռիփսիմեի եկեցեցու [History of the Construction Activities of the Mother See of Holy Etchmiadzin During the Reign of Catholicos of All Armenians Vazgen I (1956–1980): Renovation and Restoration Works of the Church of Saint Hripsime]". Etchmiadzin (in Armenian): 32–38. Archived from the original on 28 February 2024.
- Thierry, J. M. (1980). "Les tétraconques à niches d'angle (Etude typologioue d'un groupe d'églises subcaucasiennes) [Tetraconchs with corner niches (A typological study of a group of sub-Caucasian churches)]". Bazmavep (in French). 138 (1–4): 124–180. Archived from the original on 17 April 2026.

=== Published books ===
- Adalian, Rouben Paul (2010). Historical Dictionary of Armenia. Lanham, Maryland: Scarecrow Press. ISBN 978-0-8108-7450-3.
- Arakel of Tabriz (2010) [1662]. Book of History. Translated by George Bournoutian. Costa Mesa, California: Mazda Publishers. ISBN 978-1-56859-172-8.
- Ching, Frank D. K.; Jarzombek, Mark; Prakash, Vikramaditya (2017). A Global History of Architecture (3rd ed.). John Wiley & Sons. ISBN 9781118981337.
- Corley, Felix (1996). "The Armenian Church Under the Soviet Regime, Part 1: The Leadership of Kevork" (PDF). Religion, State & Society. 24 (1). Keston Institute: 9–53. doi:10.1080/09637499608431724. ISSN 0963-7494. Archived (PDF) from the original on 23 September 2015.
- Der Nersessian, Sirarpie (1978). Armenian Art. London: Thames and Hudson.
- Harutyunyan, Arsen [in Armenian] (2018). Ս. Հռիփսիմե վանքը [S. Hripsime Monastery] (PDF) (in Armenian). Mother See of Holy Etchmiadzin. ISBN 978-9939-59-213-8. Archived from the original (PDF) on 4 June 2020. (alt PDF, archived)
- Harutyunyan, Varazdat (1992). Հայկական ճարտարապետության պատմություն [History of Armenian Architecture] (PDF) (in Armenian). Yerevan: Luys. ISBN 5-545-00215-4. Archived from the original (PDF) on 2 January 2022.
- Kazaryan, A. Yu. (2009). "'Новый Иерусалим' в пространственных концепциях и архитектурных формах средневековой Армении" ["New Jerusalem" in Spatial Concepts and Architectural Forms of Medieval Armenia]. In Lidov, A. M. (ed.). Новые Иерусалимы : Иеротопия и иконография сакральных пространств [New Jerusalems: Hierotopy and Iconography of Sacred Spaces] (in Russian). Moscow: Indrik. p. 520-543. ISBN 978-5-91674-051-6.
- Krautheimer, Richard (1986) [1965]. "The Borderlands: Armenia and Georgia". Early Christian and Byzantine Architecture (Fourth ed.). Penguin Books. pp. 321–330.
- Lynch, H. F. B. (1901). Armenia: Travels and Studies. Vol. I: The Russian Provinces. London: Longmans, Green, and Co. pp. 268-270.
- Manoukian, Agopik (2013). "Un témoignage sur une restauration de l'époque post-stalinienne : l'église Sainte-Hripsimé à Etchmiadzine (Arménie)" [A testimony on a restoration from the post-Stalinist era: the Saint Hripsime Church in Etchmiadzin (Armenia)]. In Ter Minassian, Taline [in French] (ed.). Patrimoine & Architecture dans les États post-soviétiques [Heritage & Architecture in Post-Soviet States] (in French). Presses Universitaires de Rennes. pp. 45–60. ISBN 9782753526426.
- Maranci, Christina (1998). Medieval Armenian Architecture in historiography: Josef Strygowski and His Legacy (PhD thesis). Princeton University. OCLC 40827094.
- Marutyan, Tiran [in Armenian] (1976). "Էջմիածնի Ս. Հռիփսիմե տաճարը". Ավանի տաճարը և համանման հուշարձանները [Avan Cathedral and Similar Monuments] (PDF). Yerevan: Hayastan. pp. 77–92. Archived from the original (PDF) on 20 February 2024.
- Mnatsakanian, S. (2004a). "Համեմատական ճարտարապետական վերլուծություն [Comparative architectural analysis]". Հայկական ճարտարապետության պատմություն, հ. 3 [History of Armenian Architecture. Vol. III] (PDF). Yerevan: Armenian Academy of Sciences. pp. 120-137.
- Mnatsakanian, Stepan (2004b). "Հռիփսիմեի վկայարանը Վաղարշապատում [Hripsime's maryrium in Vagharshapat]". Հայկական ճարտարապետության պատմություն, հ. 3 [History of Armenian Architecture. Vol. III] (PDF) (in Armenian). Yerevan: Armenian Academy of Sciences. p. 193-195. Archived (PDF) from the original on 14 July 2024.</ref>
- Neale, John Mason (1850). A History of the Holy Eastern Church. Part I. London: Joseph Masters.
- Strzygowski, Josef (1918). Die Baukunst der Armenier und Europa [The Architecture of the Armenians and of Europe] (in German). Vol. I. Vienna: Kunstverlag Anton Schroll & Co. pp. 92–94.
- Thierry, Jean-Michel; Donabédian, Patrick (1989) [1987]. Armenian Art. Translated by Celestine Dars. New York: Harry N. Abrams. ISBN 0-8109-0625-2.
