= Komitas (disambiguation) =

Komitas, or Gomidas, also known as Gomidas Vartabed, birth name Soghomon Gevorgi Soghomonyan (1869–1935), was an Armenian musician.

Komitas (also spelled Gomidas) may also refer to:

== Komitas ==
- Komitas (Catholicos), or Komitas Aghtsetsi, or Gomidas I of Armenia, Catholicos of All Armenians (615–628)
- Komitas Avenue, an avenue in Yerevan, Armenia
- Komitas Chamber Music House, a concert hall in Yerevan, Armenia
- Yerevan Komitas State Conservatory, a state-owned college of music in Yerevan, Armenia
- Komitas Museum, a museum and institute in Yerevan, Armenia
- Komitas Pantheon, Yerevan, Armenia
- Komitas Quartet, Russian string quartet

== Gomidas ==
- Gomidas Institute, London-based academic institution dedicated to modern Armenian and regional studies
- Gomidas Songs, 2008 album by Serouj Kradjian with Chamber Players of the Armenian Philharmonic conducted by Eduard Topchjan and released on Nonesuch label
