= Woman with a Mirror (Giulio Romano) =

Painting by Giulio Romano

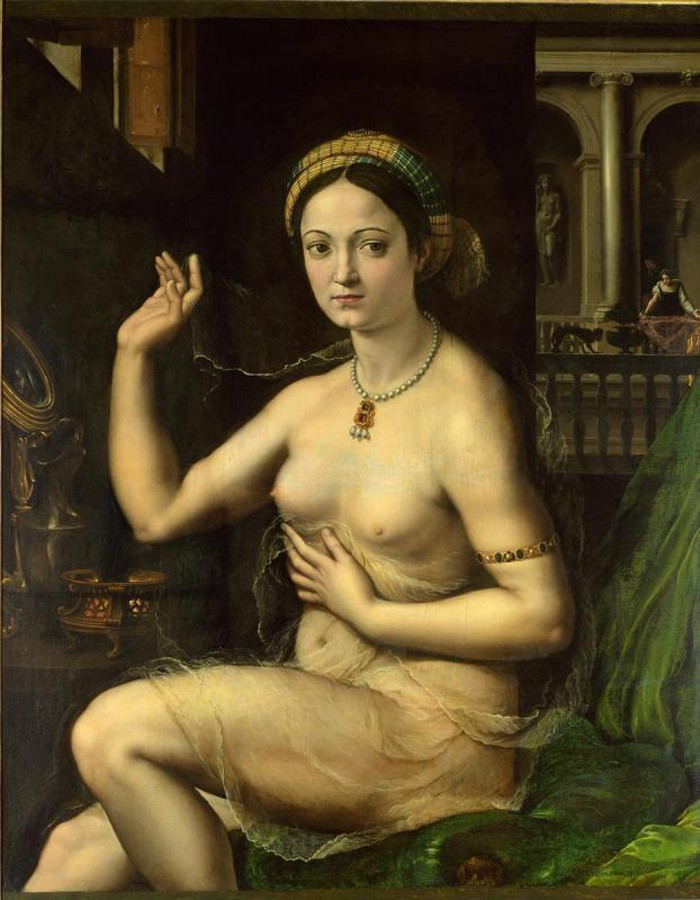
Woman with a Mirror (c. 1520) by Giulio Romano

Woman with a Mirror is a c. 1520 oil painting by Giulio Romano, originally on panel and transferred to canvas by A. Mitrochin in 1840.

Until the mid 19th century it was misattributed to Raphael. Frederick Hartt theorises that it was begun by the artist in Rome just before he moved to Mantua in 1524 and completed by Raffaellino del Colle.

It entered the Hermitage Museum under the title Portrait of the Young Beatrice d'Este, Duchess of Ferrara, but this cannot be correct since she had died in 1497 and was duchess of Milan not Ferrara, whilst no noblewoman of that time would have allowed herself to be portrayed naked. It was later known as Portrait of Lucrezia Borgia, daughter of Pope Alexander VI and consort of the Duke of Ferrara Alfonso I d'Este.

== Bibliography ==
- Ferino-Pagden, Sylvia (1989). Giulio Romano. Giunti Editore. p. 229. ISBN 978-8809761247.
- Reynolds, Joshua; Duppa, Richard (1816). The Life of Raffaello Sanzio da Urbino. London: Printed for J. Murray by J. Moyes. p. 212.
- (in German) Waagen, Gustave Friedrich (1864). Die Gemaldesammlung in der Kaiserlichen Ermitage zu St. Petersburg: nebst Bemerkungen über andere dortige Kunstsammlungen. München: Friedrich Bruckmann's Verlag. p. 50.
