= Art: A History of Painting, Sculpture, and Architecture =

- Author: Frederick Hartt
- Subject: Art history
- Publisher: Harry N. Abrams. Incorporated
- Publication date: 1976
- Dewey Decimal: 709
- LC Class: N5300

Art: A History of Painting, Sculpture, and Architecture is a two-volume collection of general art history written by Frederick Hartt. Volume I covers from the Paleolithic cave paintings to late medieval art. Volume II starts at the Renaissance and ends with modern art. It was originally published in 1976 by Harry N. Abrams. Incorporated, New York, with 1,271 illustrations, including 157 in full color and 28 with gold, 34 maps created especially for this work. Six timelines, 3 in each volume, relate important historical and cultural events to the arts of their period.
