= The Book of Letters =

Armenian collection of religious documents

The Book of Letters or The Book of Messages (Armenian: Գիրք թղթոց) is an Armenian collection of church and religious documents of the 7th century. It is a copy made in 1298 by a priest named Thomas of Hromklay (Tovma Hromklayeci), at Sis, the capital of Cilician Armenia. Thomas' copy was taken in part from an earlier collection made in 1077. Includes authentic correspondence of Armenian, Syrian, Byzantine, Iranian, Georgian, etc. church figures.

It is assumed that the main part of the collection was compiled by Catholicos Komitas Aghtsetsi (615-628). Later, 98 more documents (letters) were added, which chronologically cover the period of the 5th-13th centuries. The oldest document is a letter from the Archbishop of Constantinople Proclus to Sahak Partev. The compilation of the collection was due to the struggle of the Armenian Church against Chalcedonism. The Book of Letters is an important historical source for revealing the history of the Armenian Church in the early Middle Ages. The materials of the collection also contain important information about other countries of the Transcaucasus - Georgia and Caucasian Albania, valuable data on the social terminology of the time

== Editions ==
The first edition was published in 1901. It was republished and reedited in classical Armenian as second edition in 1994 by Archbishop Norayr Pogharian and in French in 1999 by Professor Nina Garsoïan in L'Église arménienne et le grand schisme d'Orient (The Armenian Church and the Great Eastern Schism).

== Criticism ==
According to Professor Robert W. Thomson the second edition of the Book of Letters by Pogharian, based on a broader range of textual evidence, provides better readings in many places, but the order of the items has been changed from that of the original in accordance with Pogharian's own views concerning their dating. Garsoïan's French translation is the most comprehensive investigation of the question to date, and her conclusions will take a while to be assimilated but there is as yet no translation of all the documents in the collection, nor is there a study of its compilation over the centuries. Many of the documents are also quoted by the tenth-century Armenian historian Ukhtanes in his History. Ukhtanes quotes correspondence between the religious leaders of Armenia and Georgia and it has not been examined whether Armenian concerns of the time caused him to doctor his material as earlier versions of the correspondence are in the Letters. The existing manuscripts of the Letters are not earlier than Ukhtanes and parts of them have been translated, but in the second edition (1994) the question of editorial policy is raised and requires further study.
