= Adriano Alpago-Novello =

Italian architect, art historian and professor

- Born: 20 July 1932; Belluno, Veneto, Italy
- Died: 4 June 2005 (aged 72)
- Education: Polytechnic University of Milan
- Occupations: Architect, art historian, professor

Adriano Alpago-Novello (July 10, 1932 in Belluno – June 4, 2005 in Belluno) was an Italian architect, art historian and professor.

Adriano Alpago-Novello was born in Belluno to Alberto Alpago-Novello, architect and urban planner, and Laura Carlotti.

After classical studies at the Leone XXIII of Milan, in 1957 he graduated in architecture at the Politecnico di Milano, where since 1958 become an assistant professor of History of Art and History and Styles of architecture. In the same year he is responsible for the organization of the site and of thearchitectural surveys of the excavation of the Roman theater in Caesarea, Israel: finding how little the archeologists working on the site know or care about the culture identifiable as "Byzantine", drives him to schedule a systematic series of fact-finding visits and photographic campaigns on the presence of Byzantine churches in central and eastern Mediterranean. The result is a series of studies that lead to the achievement of the professorship and the assignment to University. Since 1963 is assistant professor at the Politecnico di Milano to the chair of History of Art and History and Styles of architecture, of which in 1971 he became a lecturer; in the same year he is Professor of History of Architecture at the Faculty of Architecture in Turin. Since 1975 he is associate professor at the Faculty of Architecture of Milan, since 1987 Professor of History of Muslim art at the University Ca 'Foscari of Venice.

He participates as a speaker at numerous national and international conferences on architecture and Byzantine studies and is invited to give lectures in many Italian and foreign universities.

He devotes special attention to the study, under the historical and architectural point of view, of cultural areas of Italy not yet known, with a particular interest for mountain and rural regions, in order for a recovery of the local cultures and values of traditional architecture. Specific insights regarding the territory of Belluno bring to the show "Val Belluna, Case nella Campagna", 1964, and to numerous publications on the subject [1] [2] [3]. After the exhibition opening, Dino Buzzati wrote an article in the Corriere della Sera entitled: "The architect who has seen."

Partner and adviser to Italia Nostra, he is deeply devoted to defend the historical heritage with lectures and debates in various Italian cities.

In 1967 he founds and directs the Center for Studies and Documentation of Armenian Culture. The Center published the "Documenti di architettura Armena" (Documents of Armenian architecture) and "Ricerca sull' architettura Armena" (Research on Armenian architecture) series. He was the organizer of the exhibition of Medieval Armenian Architecture which visited several Italian cities and more than eighteen countries from South America to Iran and Armenia.

From 1967 to 1983 is responsible and member of study missions, under the official patronage of the Ministry of Foreign Affairs of Italy, in Armenian territory, Georgia, Iran, Northern Syria.

He received several international awards (international prize "Parekorzagan" for Armenian scholars who have made a fundamental contribution in the field of Armenian art, award "Thoros Thoromanian" of the Academy of Sciences of Armenia for Armenian art scholars, medaglia Reza Pahalevi for the study work carried out in Iran).

He was scientific advisor for the architecture sector of the series of studies on "Popular Cultura Popolare Veneta" (promoted by the Veneto Region and the Fondazione Giorgio Cini) and co-director of the Historical Archive of Belluno, Feltre and Cadore.

At the professional level he operated especially in the Veneto Region and in Milan, devoting particularly to restoration works.

== Selected bibliography ==
- Alpago-Novello, Adriano "L'architettura armena e l'Italia", De luca, Roma, 1990
- Alpago-Novello, Adriano (1986), The Armenians (1st ed.), Italy: Rizzoli International Publications, Inc., ISBN 0-8478-0731-2, OCLC 13796582
- Adriano Alpago-Novello, Vaxtang Beriże, Jacqueline Lafontaine-Dosogne, "Art and Architecture in Medieval Georgia", 1980, 521 p.
- Adriano Alpago-Novello, Nikolai Mikhaĭlovich Tokarsky, "Amberd", 1972, 56 p.
- Adriano Alpago-Novello, Giulio Ieni, "Amaghu Noravank", 1985, 61 p.
- Adriano Alpago-Novello, Mourad Hasratian, "Ketcharis", 1982, 59 p.
- Adriano Alpago-Novello, Geōrgios Dēmētrokallēs, "L'Arte Bizantina in Grecia", 1995, 207 p.
- Adriano Alpago-Novello, "Val Belluna. Case nella Campagna", 1964
- Adriano Alpago-Novello, "Ville e case dominicali della Val Belluna", Panfilo Castaldi, 1961
- Adriano Alpago-Novello, "Ville della provincia di Belluno", 1968

== Sources ==
- Grecia bizantina, by Adriano Alpago-Novello, 1969, 162 p. (Biography)
- ADRIANO ALPAGO-NOVELLO PASSED AWAY, by Azg daily, 2005
