= Frederick Hartt =

American art historian

- Born: May 22, 1914; Boston, Massachusetts, U.S.
- Died: October 31, 1991 (aged 77); Washington, D.C., U.S.
- Education: Columbia University; New York University Institute of Fine Arts
- Occupation: Art historian
- Employer(s): Washington University in St. Louis; University of Pennsylvania; University of Virginia

Frederick Hartt (May 22, 1914 – October 31, 1991) was an Italian Renaissance scholar, author and professor of art history. His books include History of Italian Renaissance Art, Art: A History of Painting, Sculpture, and Architecture (two volumes), Michelangelo (Masters of Art Series), The Sistine Chapel and The Renaissance in Italy and Spain (Metropolitan Museum of Art Series). He was also involved with cataloging and repatriating artwork looted and stolen by the Third Reich during World War II.

== Biography ==
Hartt was born in Boston, Massachusetts, on 22 May 1914, the son of Rollin Lynde Hartt and Jessie Clark Knight (Hartt). He graduated from Columbia College in 1935 and received his PhD from New York University's Institute of Fine Arts in 1950; the subject of his dissertation was Giulio Romano and the Palazzo del Te.

From 1942 to 1946, during World War II, Hartt was an officer in the Monuments, Fine Arts, and Archives program of the US Army and received a Bronze Star. He was also made an honorary citizen of Florence, and was decorated with the Knight's Cross by the Italian government.

He was on the faculty of the art history department at Washington University in St. Louis from 1949 to 1960, and from 1960 to 1967 he taught at the University of Pennsylvania. In 1967 he moved to the University of Virginia, where he was chairman of the art department from 1967 to 1976.

In 1969, Hartt published a textbook survey of Renaissance art, History of Italian Renaissance Art: Painting, Sculpture, Architecture, which has been revised and reprinted numerous times.

He became a professor emeritus of the University of Virginia in 1984.

Harrt died in Washington, D.C., on 31 October 1991.

== Michelangelo controversy ==
In 1986 Hartt authenticated a plaster statue of a headless torso as an original by Michelangelo. "In March 1987, he presented his findings at the New York Academy of Sciences, where several other scholars confirmed his judgment." An English newspaper, The Independent, later published an article implying that Hartt had acted dishonestly. He sued the paper for libel. While Hartt won the case, the judge reduced the sum awarded because Hartt had accepted a "commission on the sale of the statue after his writings about it were published."

== Bibliography (partial list) ==
- Hartt, Frederick (1949). Florentine Art Under Fire. Princeton, NJ: Princeton University Press.
- Hartt, Frederick (1953). Sandro Botticelli. Harry N. Abrams, Inc.
- Hartt, Frederick (1964). Love in Baroque Art. J.J. Augustin.
- Hartt, Frederick (1968). Michelangelo: The Complete Sculpture. ISBN 9780810903005.
- Hartt, Frederick (1969). History of Italian Renaissance Art: Painting, Sculpture, Architecture. Harry N. Abrams, Inc. ISBN 9780810911635.

== Sources ==
- Kleinbauer, W. Eugène (1989). Modern perspectives in Western art history: an anthology of twentieth-century writings on the visual arts; Volume 25 of Medieval Academy reprints for teaching. University of Toronto Press, 1989. p. 293. ISBN 0-8020-6708-5.
