= Patrick Donabédian =

Patrick Donabédian (born 13 February 1953) is a French scholar specializing in Armenian studies, especially the history of Armenian architecture.

Born in Tunis, Tunisia as a French citizen, Donabédian is of Armenian origin. He studied Russian and Armenian, Armenology and history of medieval art at Provence University (1970–74), Yerevan State University, Yerevan Polytechnic Institute, the Academy of Fine Arts of Leningrad (1975–80), Paris XIII-Nanterre University (1980–85), and Montpellier III University (2002–04).

Between 1992 and 2006, he was employed by the French Ministry of Foreign Affairs as culture counsellor in Eastern Europe, including in Armenia (1992–96). Between 2006 and 2020, he was researcher at the Laboratoire d’Archéologie Médiévale et Moderne en Méditerranée (LA3M, Aix-en-Provence), and Associate Professor Emeritus of Armenian Studies and Medieval Art at Aix-Marseille University (AMU). He headed the Armenian-French archaeological mission to the 4th–6th-century church Yereruyk from 2009 to 2016.

== Publications ==
- Jean-Michel Thierry, Patrick Donabédian and Nicole Thierry. Armenian Art. Translated by Célestine Dars. New York: H.N. Abrams, 1989. ISBN 9780810906259
- Levon Chorbajian, Patrick Donabedian, Claude Mutafian. The Caucasian Knot: The History and Geo-Politics of Nagorno-Karabagh. London: ZED Books. 1994. ISBN 1-85649-288-5
