= Hovhannes Khalpakhchian =

Hovhannes Khalpakhchian (Armenian: Հովհաննես Խալփախչյան; Russian: Оганес Хачатурович Халпахчьян, Oganes Khachaturovich Khalpakhchian; August 1(14), 1907 – 1996) was a Soviet Armenian architect and architectural historian. Christina Maranci described him as a "major scholar of Armenian architecture", who stressed its local origins and development.

Born in Nakhichevan-on-Don (Rostov-on-Don), he was initially a practicing architect in the studio of Alexander Tamanian in Yerevan. He designed several residential and public buildings. He transitioned into academic research in the late 1930s. The main focus of his sixty-year scholarly career was the study of the history of Armenian architecture from antiquity to modern times. He also edited major Soviet series on world architecture, including several volumes of the 12-volume General History of Architecture (1966-77).

Armen Kazaryan and Igor Bondarenko described him as an outstanding expert on medieval Armenian architecture and a key figure at the Research Institute of Theory and History of Architecture and Urban Planning for several decades.

He died in Moscow and was buried at the Moscow Armenian Cemetery.
