= Jacqueline Lafontaine-Dosogne =

- Born: 23 November 1928; Braine-l'Alleud
- Died: 21 May 1995; City of Brussels
- Occupations: Art historian, curator, Byzantinist, university teacher

Jacqueline Lafontaine-Dosogne (23 November 1928, in Braine-l'Alleud - 21 May 1995, in Brussels) was a Belgian researcher, curator of the Royal Museums of Belgium, and a specialist in the Byzantine Empire and, more broadly, in the history of Christian art.

A prolific scholar, she produced more than 120 publications in her fields of study.

== Biography ==
She was born on 23 November 1928, in Braine-l'Alleud. She studied at the Free University of Brussels, where she earned a degree in art history and archaeology (1955), before pursuing a doctorate in philology and classical literature, which she obtained in 1961. The subject of her thesis was later published in two volumes, titled "Iconography of the Childhood of the Virgin in the Byzantine Empire and the West". She was an accomplished polyglot, which aided her in her research and travels, and spoke French, English, and Italian fluently, and had a very good understanding of German, Dutch, Modern Greek, and Russian, with some knowledge of Turkish, Bulgarian, Romanian, and Spanish.

Lafontaine-Dosogne was involved in research starting in the 1950s. She began by studying the artistic representations of the narratives of Jesus' childhood. In the course of this research, she highlighted the connections between apocryphal literature on the childhood, such as the Protoevangelium of James and Byzantine hymnography, like the Akathist Hymn.

Lafontaine-Dosogne joined the National Society of Antiquaries of France in 1978, on the recommendation of André Grabar and with the sponsorship of Louis Grodecki. She had a particular interest in the art of Pisidia, the region of Antioch, the art of Cappadocia, and the art of the Caucasus through Georgian art. She also compiled lists of Byzantine objects in Western Europe that came from the plundering of the Crusades.

It is estimated that she produced over 120 different publications. She died on 21 May 1995, in Brussels.
