= Karo Ghafadaryan =

Armenian archaeologist and historian (1907–1976)

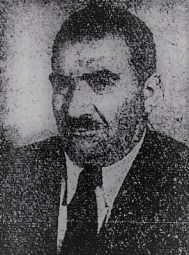
- Born: April 20, 1907; Akhaltsikhe, Tiflis Governorate, Russian Empire (present-day Samtskhe-Javakheti, Georgia
- Died: December 21, 1976 (aged 69); Yerevan, Armenian SSR, Soviet Union
- Education: Yerevan State University
- Awards: Honored Worker of Science of the Armenian SSR (1961)
- Scientific career
- Fields: History

Karo Ghafadaryan (Armenian: Կարո Ղաֆադարյան; April 20, 1907 – December 21, 1976) was a Soviet Armenian archaeologist, historian, epigraphist, philologist. He was the director of the History Museum of Armenia (1940–1965). "Under his guidance, the Museum became an advanced research and cultural-educational centre" in Armenia.

Born in Akhaltsikhe, he graduated from the Yerevan State University in 1931. Since 1932 he worked at the Institute of Culture History and took part in the excavations of Shengavit, Vagharshapat and other ancient locations. He supervised the excavations of the ruins of the medieval Armenian capital of Dvin for around three decades. Since 1959 until his death he headed the department of medieval archaeology of the Armenian Academy of Sciences.
