= Armen Kazaryan =

Armenian art historian (born 1963)

Armen Kazaryan (Russian: Армен Юрьевич Казарян; Armenian: Արմեն Ղազարյան; born June 15, 1963) is an Armenian and Russian art historian who specializes in medieval Armenian, Georgian and Byzantine architecture.

Born in Yerevan, Armenia, he resides in Moscow. He is a graduate of the Yerevan Polytechnic Institute. He completed his postgraduate studies at the Russian State Institute of Art Studies under Alexei Komech. His dissertation concerned 7th century Caucasian architecture. He was deputy director of the Research Institute of the Theory and History of Architecture and Town Planning of the Russian Academy of Architecture and Construction Sciences. He has published widely on medieval Armenian architecture. His four-volume study Church Architecture of the Seventh Century in Transcaucasian Countries: Formation and Development of the Tradition in Russian (2012–13) was honored with the Europa Nostra Award (2014). He has extensively studied the architecture of Ani and served as a consultant in its conservation projects.
