= Jean-Michel Thierry =

French physician and art historian (1916–2011)

Jean-Michel Thierry de Crussol (1916–2011) was a French physician and art historian. His specialities are in Byzantine and Armenian art.

He was born on 13 August 1916 in Bagnères de Luchon, France. He studied and got his education in Paris. He co-wrote the book Armenian Art in 1989 and also wrote many articles concerning Armenian art, especially Armenian architecture.

== Works ==
- Thierry, Jean-Michel (1989). Armenian Art. New York: Harry N. Abrams. ISBN 0-8109-0625-2.
- Thierry de Crussol, Jean-Michel (2000). L'Arménie au Moyen-Âge [Armenia in the Middle Ages]. Les Formes de la nuit (in French). Éditions Zodiaque. ISBN 2-7369-0268-8.
- Thierry de Crussol, Jean-Michel (2005). Monuments arméniens de Haute-Arménie [Armenian Monuments in Upper Armenia]. Les Formes de la nuit (in French). Paris: CNRS Éditions. ISBN 2-271-06187-3.
- Eglises et couvents du Karabagh
- Monuments arméniens du Vaspurakan
- Les Arts arméniens
- Le Couvent arménien d'Horomos
- La Cathédrale des Saints-Apôtres de Kars, 930-943
