= Komitas Aghtsetsi =

Catholicos of Armenia from 613 to 628

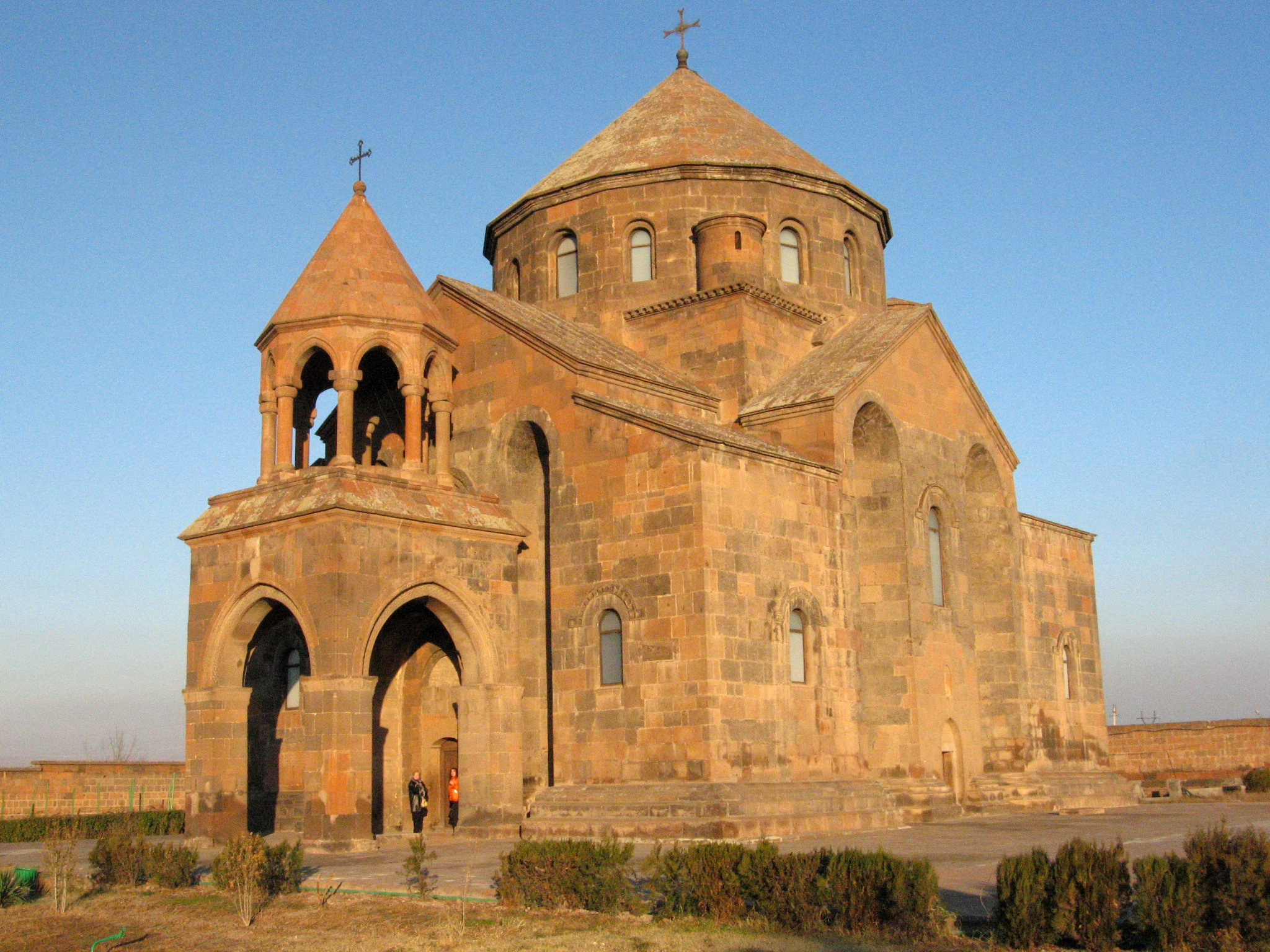
Saint Hripsime Church

Komitas I Aghtsetsi (Armenian: Կոմիտաս Ա Աղցեցի, lit. 'Komitas I of Aghtsk'), also known as Komitas the Builder (Armenian: Կոմիտաս Շինող, romanized: Komitas Shinogh), was the Catholicos of Armenia from 613 until his death in 628. He oversaw several building projects, among which were the complete renovation of Etchmiadzin Cathedral; the construction of Saint Hripsime Church; and the building of the Church of Saint Gregory in Dvin. He is also remembered for his hymn writing and his participation in the theological debates of the time.

== Biography ==
Komitas was born in the village of Aghtsk in Sasanian-ruled Armenia. Before becoming Catholicos, he served as the bishop of Taron. In 612/613 (or 615/616 according to another dating), he participated in the council assembled by the Sasanian king Khosrow II to discuss the catholicosate of the Church of the East. There he presented the statement of faith of the Armenian Church, which condemned the Council of Chalcedon and Nestorianism. He returned to Armenia from the council as Catholicos. Komitas was a vociferous participant in doctrinal disputes. He participated in the compilation of the Knik havato (Կնիք հաւատոյ 'Seal of faith'), a collection of excerpts from the works of Armenian and non-Armenian church fathers in defense of the position of the Armenian Church; it was modeled on Timothy II of Alexandria's work Against the Council of Chalcedon.

Catholicos Komitas oversaw several building projects, among which were the complete renovation of Etchmiadzin Cathedral; the construction of Saint Hripsime Church on the site of an existing shrine; and the building of the Church of Saint Gregory in Dvin. A number of scholars maintain that Komitas may have also been the architect of Saint Hripsime Church.

A poet and musician, Komitas I contributed to the hymnography of the Armenian Church. His most famous work is the sharakan (hymn) dedicated to the martyr Hripsime and her companions, known by its incipit "Andzink nvirealk siroyn Kristosi" (Souls devoted to the love of Christ). This hymn was composed on the occasion of the consecration of Saint Hripsime Church. It is a long lyric poem, consisting of thirty-six stanzas (previous Armenian hymns contained only three or four stanzas). It was the first Armenian hymn to use the meter and structure of the Byzantine kontakion. It makes use of an abecedarius (the first letter of the first word of each stanza follows the order of the Armenian alphabet) and is written in accentual verse; the latter is rare in Armenian hymnography. The abecedarius is an old poetical convention; according to Hacikyan et al., Komitas must have adopted it from the Book of Psalms. "Andzink nvirealk siroyn Kristosi" served as a model for later Armenian hymns. Hacikyan et al. write that its "exception poetic nature and lyrical character […] opened a new era in Armenian spiritual literature.

== Works ==
- Knikʻ hawatoy Կնիք հաւատոյ, Etchmiazin, 1914. Reprinted under the title Le sceau de la foi, Lisbon, 1974.
- "Kanon srbotsʻ Hṛipʻsimeantsʻ" Կանոն սրբոց Հռիփսիմեանց, Sharakan hogewor ergotsʻ Շարական հոգեւոր երգոց, Jerusalem: S. Hakobeantsʻ, 1936, pp. 577–578. English translation: Diana Der Hovanessian; Marzbed Margossian, eds. (1978), Anthology of Armenian Poetry, New York: Columbia University Press, p. 41–42, ISBN 978-0-231-04564-3 (reprinted in Hacikyan et al. 2000, pp. 906–907).

Preceded by Abraham I of Armenia	Catholicos of the Holy See of St. Echmiadzin and All Armenians; 615–628	Succeeded by Christopher II of Armenia
