= W. Eugene Kleinbauer =

American art historian (1937–2019)

Walter Eugene Kleinbauer, Jr. (June 15, 1937 – June 3, 2019) was an American art historian specializing in Byzantine architecture. He is best known for his work on the historiography of art history.

He earned a bachelor’s degree in economics at the University of California, Berkeley in 1959 and completed a Master of Arts in history of art at Berkeley in 1962 under Walter Horn and Master of Fine Art at Princeton University in 1964 and a Ph.D. in 1967 under Kurt Weitzmann and Richard Krautheimer. He taught at UCLA from 1965 to 1972 and became associate professor and chair of fine art at Indiana University Bloomington in 1973 and spent the rest of his career there. He retired in 2006.

His 1971 book Modern Perspectives in Western Art History was "the first English-language survey on the history of art history."
