= Piotrovsky =

- Boris Piotrovsky
- Mikhail Piotrovsky
- 4869 Piotrovsky
