= Erebuni Fortress =

Fortified city, located in Armenia

Erebuni
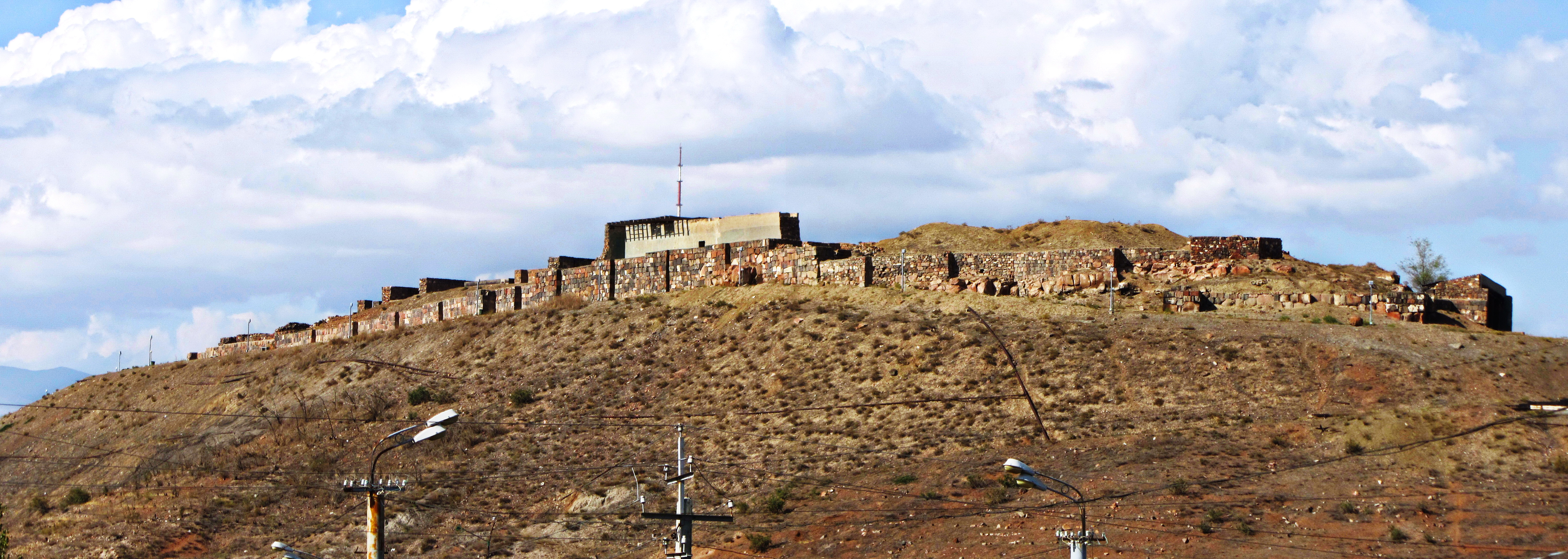
- Walls of Erebuni Fortress

- Location within Armenia
- 40.1406°N 44.5381°E
- Type: fortified settlement
- Cultures: Kingdom of Urartu:Yervandian, Marian and Achaemenid
- Location: Between the Nor Aresh District and Vardashen District, Yerevan, Armenia

History
- Built: 782 B.C.
- Built by: King Argishti I

Site notes
- Material: stone (foundation/lower walls), adobe brick (upper walls),
- Height: Site sits approximately 1,017 metres (3,335 ft) above sea level. Arin Berd hill is 65 metres (215 ft) above ground level.
- Excavation dates: Late 19th-century, 1950–1968, 2008-Present
- Archaeologists: A. Ivanovsky (19th c.), Konstantine Hovhannisyan and Boris Piotrovsky (1950–1968)
- Condition: Ruins; Extant foundations and lower walls, sections of the site remain to be excavated.
- Owner: City of Yerevan, public property
- Management: Erebuni Historical & Archaeological Museum-Reserve; separate entry fees are required for museum and fortress
- Public access: Yes

Erebuni Fortress (Armenian: Էրեբունի ամրոց, romanized: Erebuni amrots') is an Urartian fortified city, located in Yerevan, Armenia. It is 1,017 metres (3,337 ft) above sea level. It was one of several fortresses built along the northern Urartian border and was one of the most important political, economic and cultural centers of the vast kingdom. The name Yerevan itself is derived from Erebuni.

== Etymology ==
On an inscription found at Karmir Blur, the Urartian verb erebu-ni is used in the sense of "to seize, pillage, steal, or kidnap" followed by a changing direct object. Scholars have conjectured that the word, as an unchanging direct object, may also mean "to take" or "to capture" and thus believe that the Erebuni at the time of its founding meant "capture", "conquest", or "victory."

== History ==
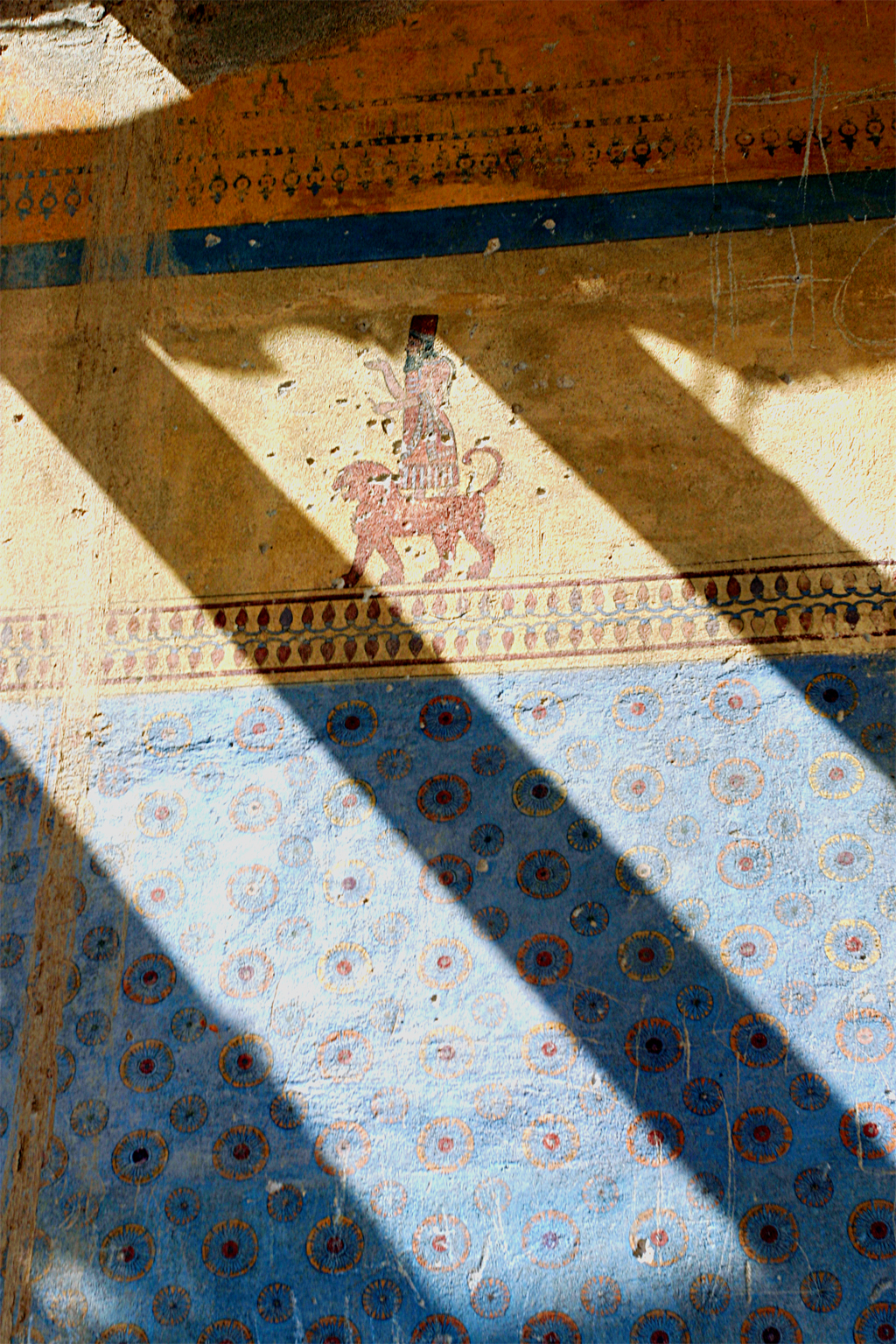
Modern reproductions of the ancient wall-paintings at Erebuni Fortress

Erebuni was founded by Urartian king Argishti I (r. c. 785–753 BC) in 782 BC. It was built on top of a hill called Arin Berd overlooking the Aras River Valley to serve as a military stronghold to protect the kingdom's northern borders. It has been described as being "designed as a great administrative and religious centre, a fully royal capital." According to Margarit Israelyan, Argishti began the construction of Erebuni after conquering the territories north of Yerevan and west of Lake Sevan, roughly corresponding to where the town of Abovyan is currently located. Accordingly, the prisoners he captured in these campaigns, both men and women, were used to help build his town.

In the autumn of 1950, an archaeological expedition led by Konstantine Hovhannisyan discovered an inscription at Arin Berd dedicated to the city's founding which was carved during Argishti's reign. Two other identical inscriptions have been found at the citadel of Erebuni. The inscription reads:

By the greatness of the God Khaldi, Argishti, son of Menua, built this mighty stronghold and proclaimed it Erebuni for the glory of Biainili (Urartu) and to instill fear among the king's enemies. Argishti says: The land was a desert, before the great works I accomplished upon it. By the greatness of Khaldi, Argishti, son of Menua, is a mighty king, king of Biainili, and ruler of Tushpa."

Argishti left a similar inscription at the Urartian capital of Tushpa (current-day Van) as well, stating that he brought 6,600 prisoners of war from Khate and Tsupani to populate his new city. Similar to other Urartian cities of the time, it was built on a triangular plan on top of a hill and ensconced by 10-to-12-metre (33 to 39 ft) high ramparts. Behind them, the buildings were separated by central and inner walls. The walls were built from a variety of materials, including basalt, tuff, wood and adobe. Argishti constructed a grand palace here and excavations conducted in the area have revealed that other notable buildings included a colonnaded royal assembly hall, a temple dedicated to Khaldi, a citadel, where the garrison resided, living quarters, dormitories and storerooms. The inner walls were richly decorated with murals and other wall paintings, displaying religious and secular scenes.

Successive Urartian kings made Erebuni their place of residence during their military campaigns against northern invaders and continued construction work to build up the fortress defences. Kings Sarduri II and Rusa I also utilized Erebuni as a staging site for new campaigns of conquest directed towards the north. In the early sixth century the Urartian state, under constant foreign invasion, collapsed.

The region soon fell under the control of the Achaemenian Empire. The strategic position that Erebuni occupied did not diminish, however, becoming an important center of the satrapy of Armenia.

Despite numerous invasions by successive foreign powers, the city was never truly abandoned and was continually inhabited over the following centuries, eventually branching out to become the city of Yerevan. Erebuni's close affinity to Yerevan was celebrated in a splendid festival held in September 1968, commemorating Erebuni's 2,750th birthday.

== Architecture ==
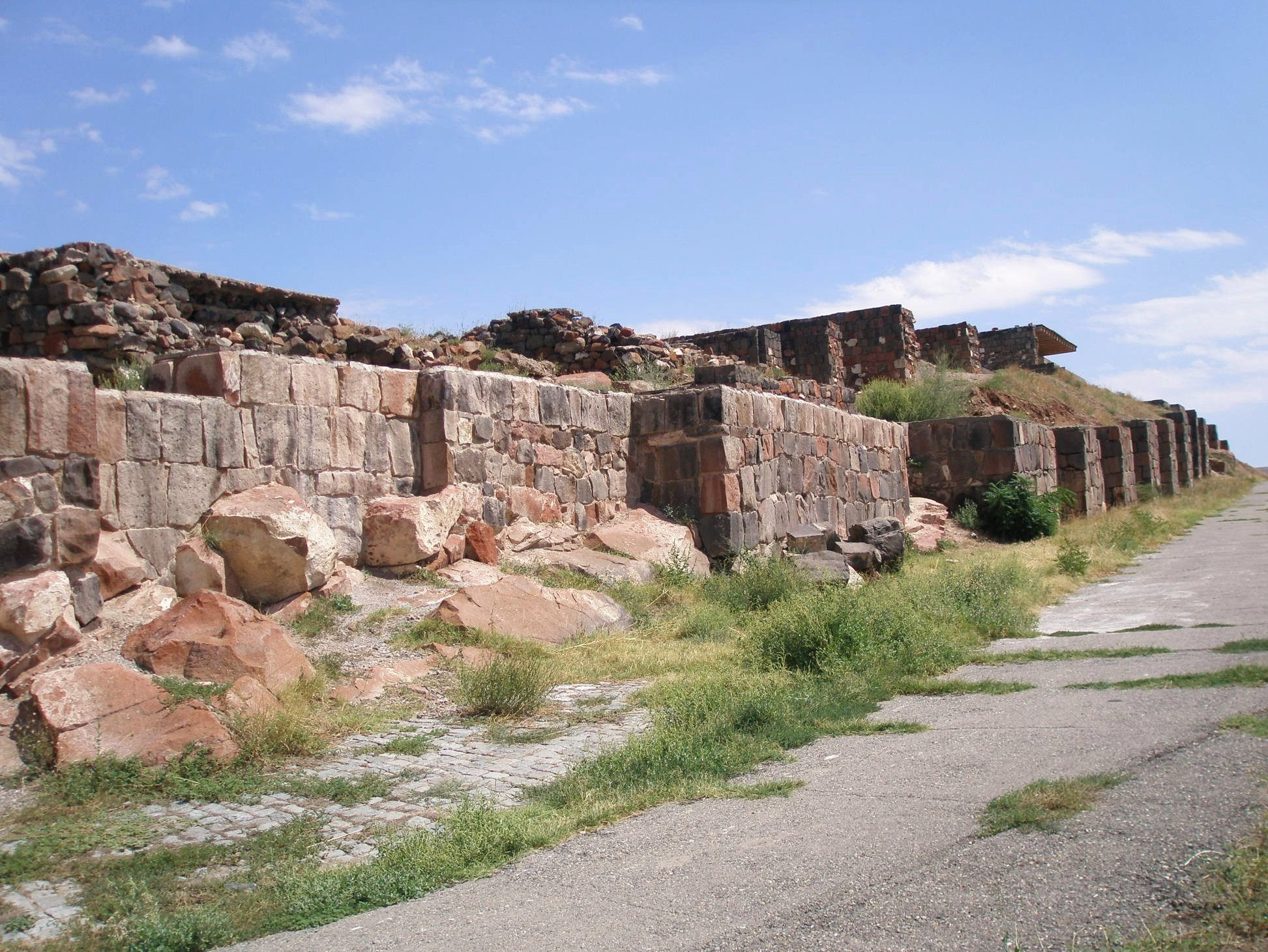
Exterior walls of Erebuni

The site of Erebuni Fortress was atop the 65-metre (213 ft) tall hill of Arin Berd as a strategic position overlooking the Ararat plain and the main roads leading to the citadel. It also overlooked a cramped Urartian town made up of residences below at the foot of the hill.

The main entrance to the fortress was located at the more gently sloped southeastern site of the hill. It led to the central yard of the citadel. Ceremonies held by the personal guards of Argishti I and guards of the fortress garrison were held here.

In the southwest portion of the yard was a temple of the god Khaldi. The temple had a large oblong plan with a staircase that led to the roof of a ziggurat type tower and a side room on the lower floor. Surrounding the hall was a double-rowed twelve-column open portico with benches along the walls. An altar for sacrifices was located at the left wall. The walls were decorated with colorful frescoes depicting representations of human figures, gods, geometric and floral designs. One of the frescoes uncovered depicts the god Khaldi standing on a lion with a warder in his left hand and a horned crown upon his head. It is typical of other representations of Khaldi found at other sites. The floor of the temple contrasted greatly from the rest of the complex in that it had wood floors composed of small planks, compared to the clay-coated adobe floors that were faced with stone slabs found in the rest of the citadel's rooms.

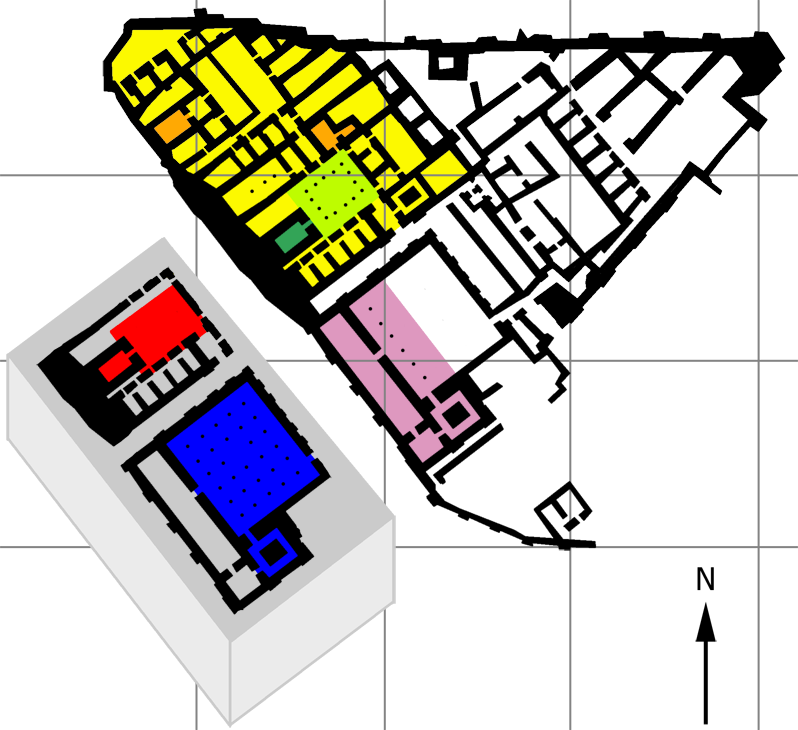
Erebuni fortress plan Territory inside the fortress Peristyle (inner courtyard) of the palace Temple of «Susi», built by Argishti I for Ivrash god «Karas rooms” (storage rooms for storing wine) Temple of Xaldi god Premises of the Achaemenid period: :Part of the fortress was rebuilt in the 6th-5th centuries BC. Apadana Temple for fire Coordinate (gray) lines are drawn every 50 m.

== Excavations ==
Early excavations began during the 19th century while more systematic excavations were carried out at Erebuni in 1952, under the joint sponsorship of the Armenian Academy of Sciences' Institute of Archaeology and Ethnography and the Pushkin Museum's Board for the Preservation and Restoration of Architectural Monuments. The team was led by Konstantine Hovhannisyan and Boris Piotrovsky, who served as an on-site adviser. In the course of the early stage of the excavations (1950–1968), Argishti's palace, the royal assembly hall, temples and over a hundred rooms were excavated. Dozens of Urartian and Achaemenian artifacts, such as pottery, earthenware, belt buckles, bracelets, beads, drinking vessels, helmets, arrows and silver coins, were also uncovered. The fragments of murals that were uncovered were found to be decorated with important religious themes, including "processions of gods, sacred animals, and trees of life", as well as scenes of everyday life, displaying scenes of "hunting, cattle breeding, and agriculture."

Storage areas for grain, oil, and wine were also uncovered. On the doors of the storage areas inscriptions were placed at the entry doors telling the who built the storage area and the quantity of the items placed in them. One such inscription reads:

By the greatness of god Chaldis, Sarduri, son of Argistis, built this house, and he also created these granaries. In one of them there were 12,600 Kapis, another one had 11,500 Kapis; entirely 24,100 Kapis. Sarduri, son of Argistis, mighty king, king of the country Bianinili, ruler of the town of Tushpah

The enormous ceramic jars that held the wine and oil had markings upon them. Smaller ceramic vessels were also found in excavations and are known to have been used in brewing beer made from barley. Other much larger vessels were used for storing foods and wine. Small circular markings on the sides of these containers near the top indicated the amount that could be stored inside. The larger of the vessels were usually buried half-way into the soil which naturally kept the contents cool.

Numerous cuneiform inscriptions carved on basalt have been found around the complex. Some of them are currently displayed in the museum, while others can still be found displayed on the walls.

In 1968 the Erebuni Museum of History was established. Its opening was timed to coincide with the 2750th anniversary of Yerevan. The museum houses items uncovered during the excavations at Arin Berd and Karmir Blur and gives a history of the site.

== Gallery ==
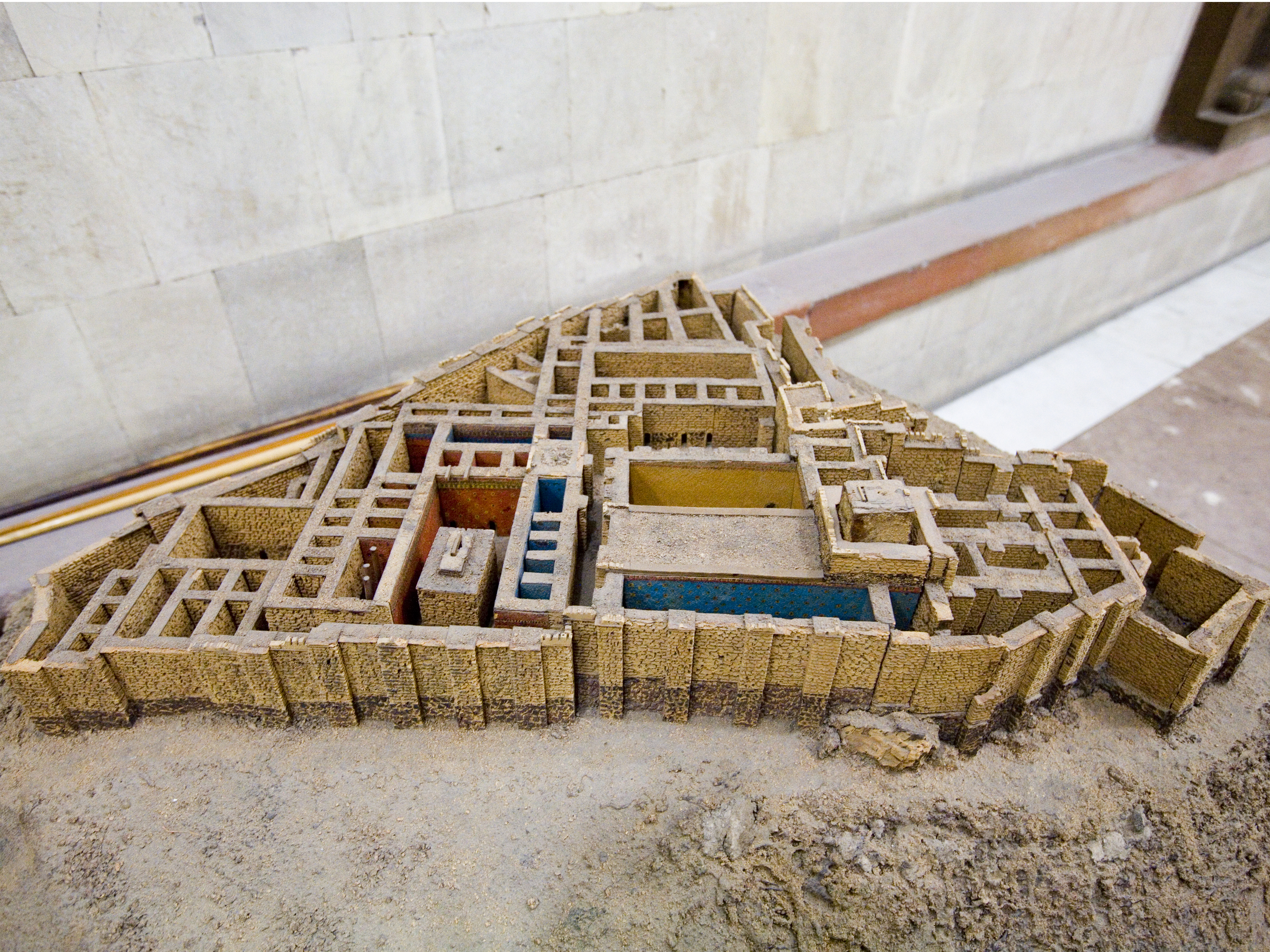
Model of the Erebuni Fortress

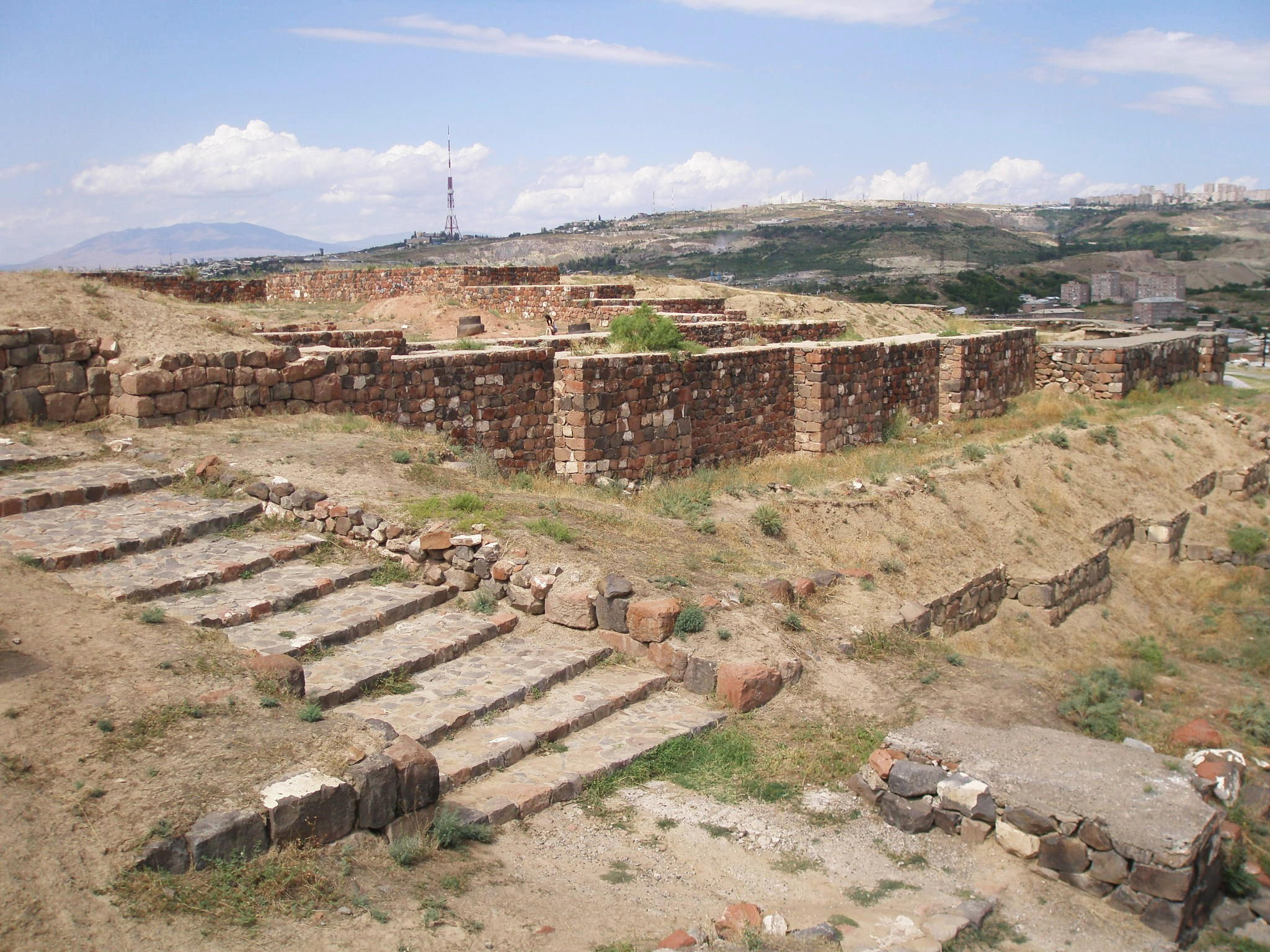

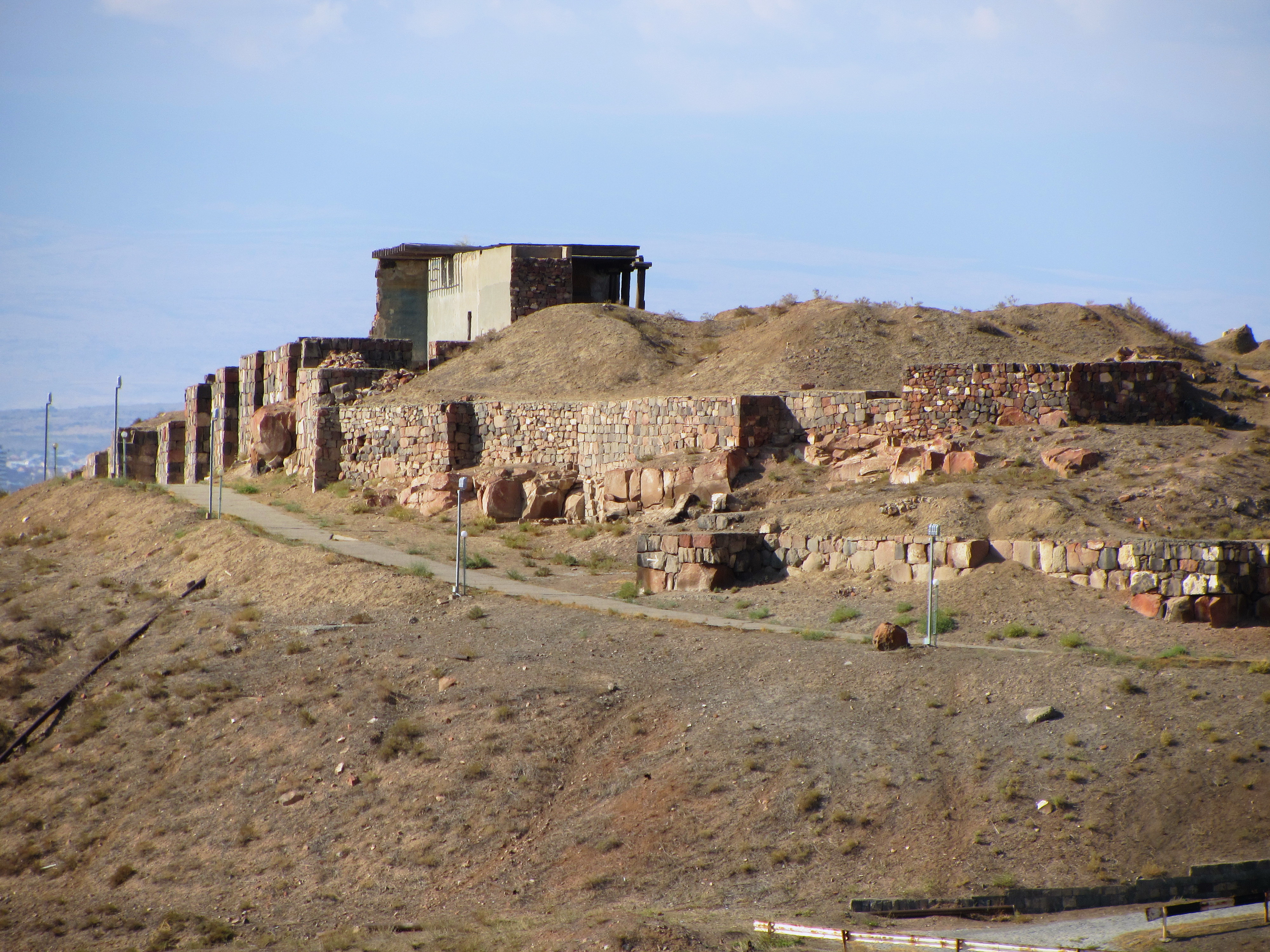

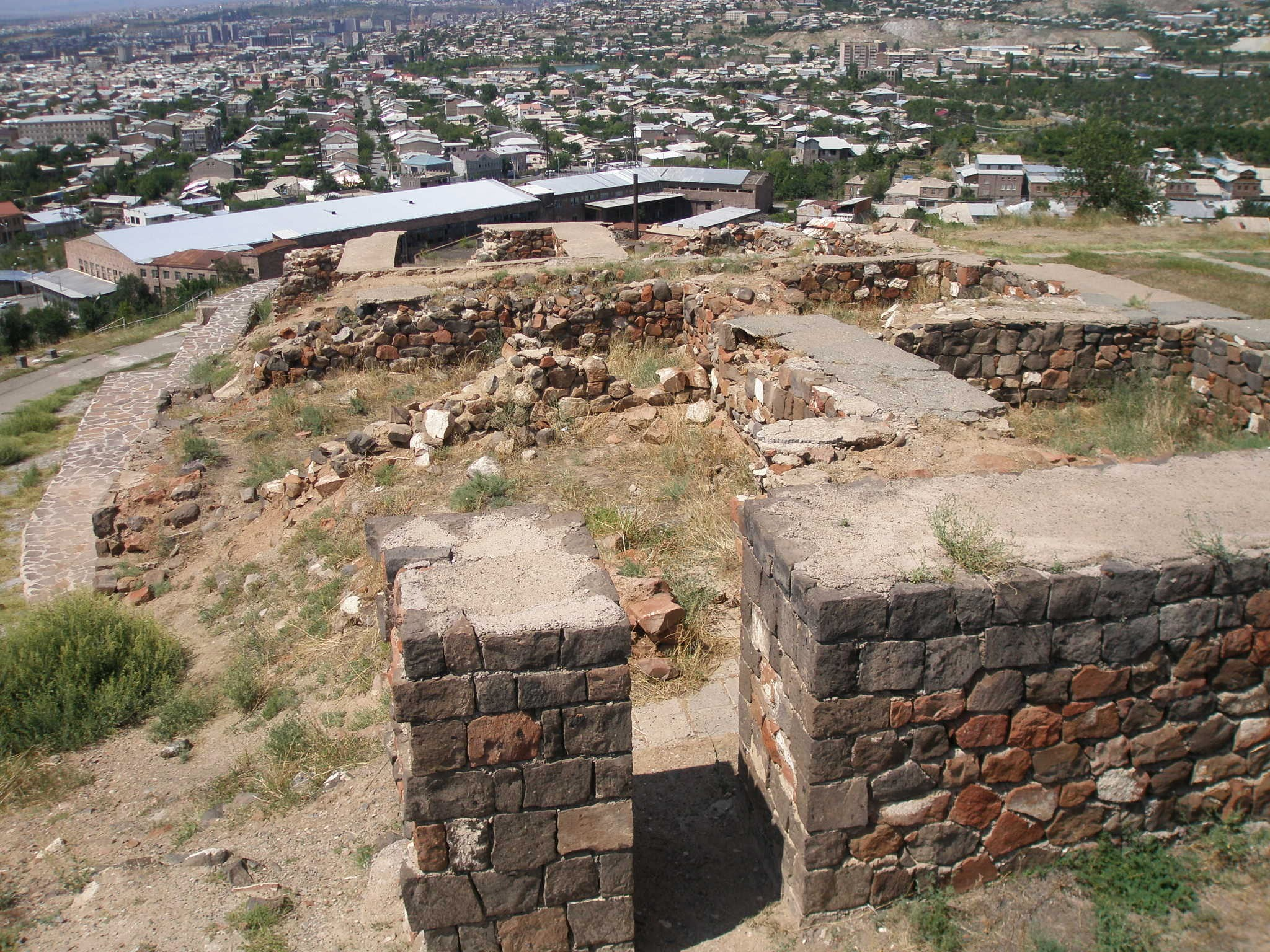
Interior walls of the citadel and Yerevan below

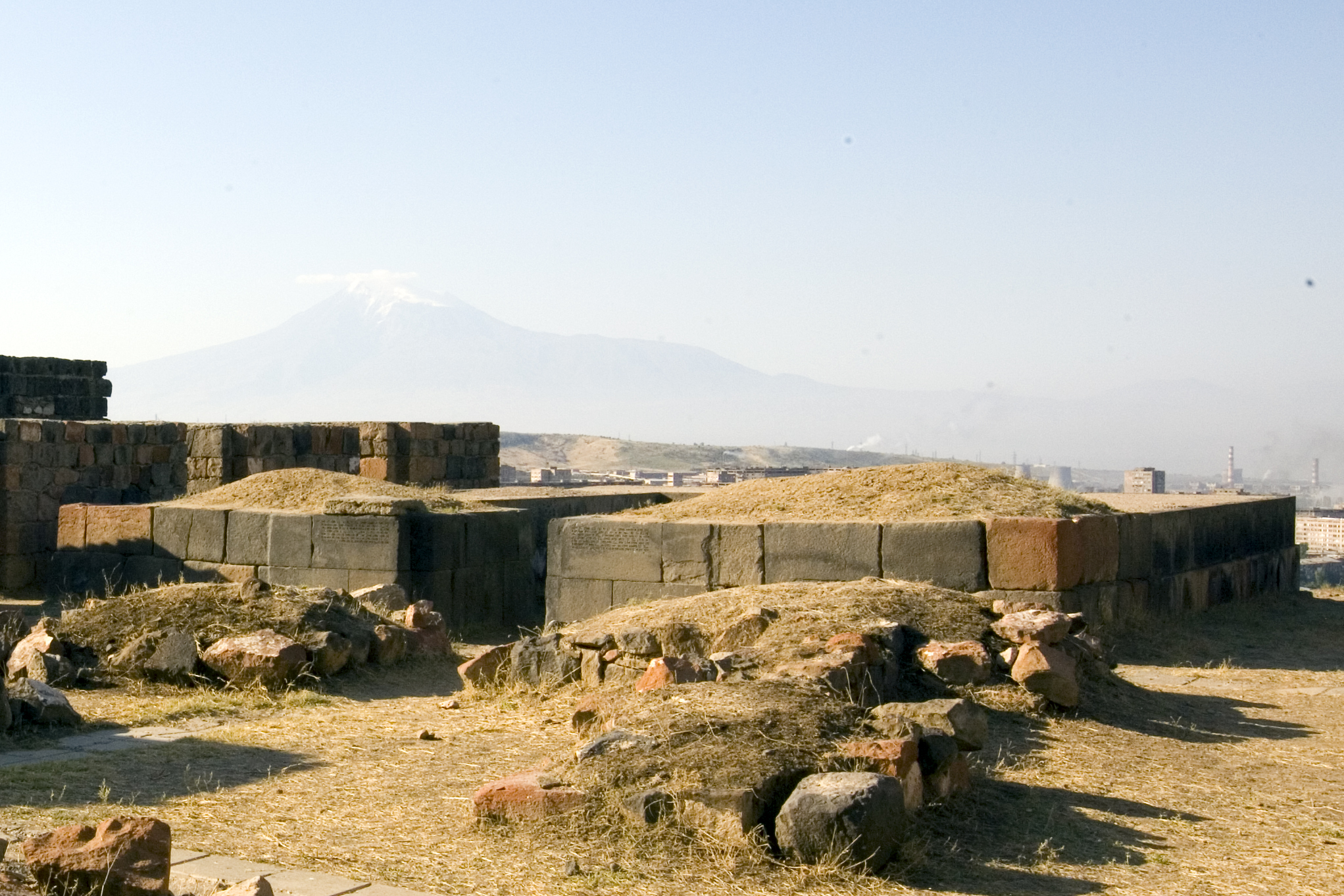
Susi Temple

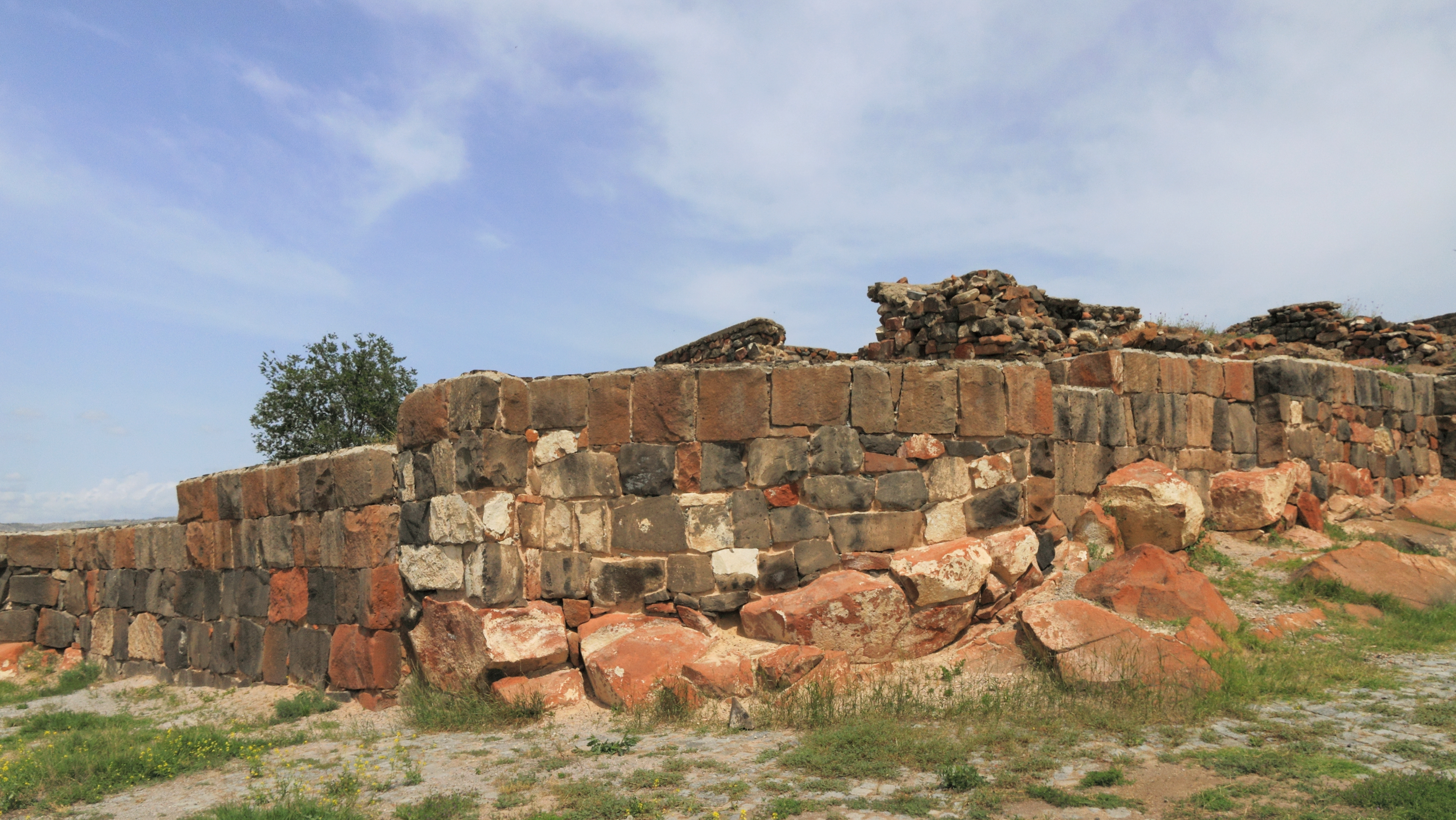

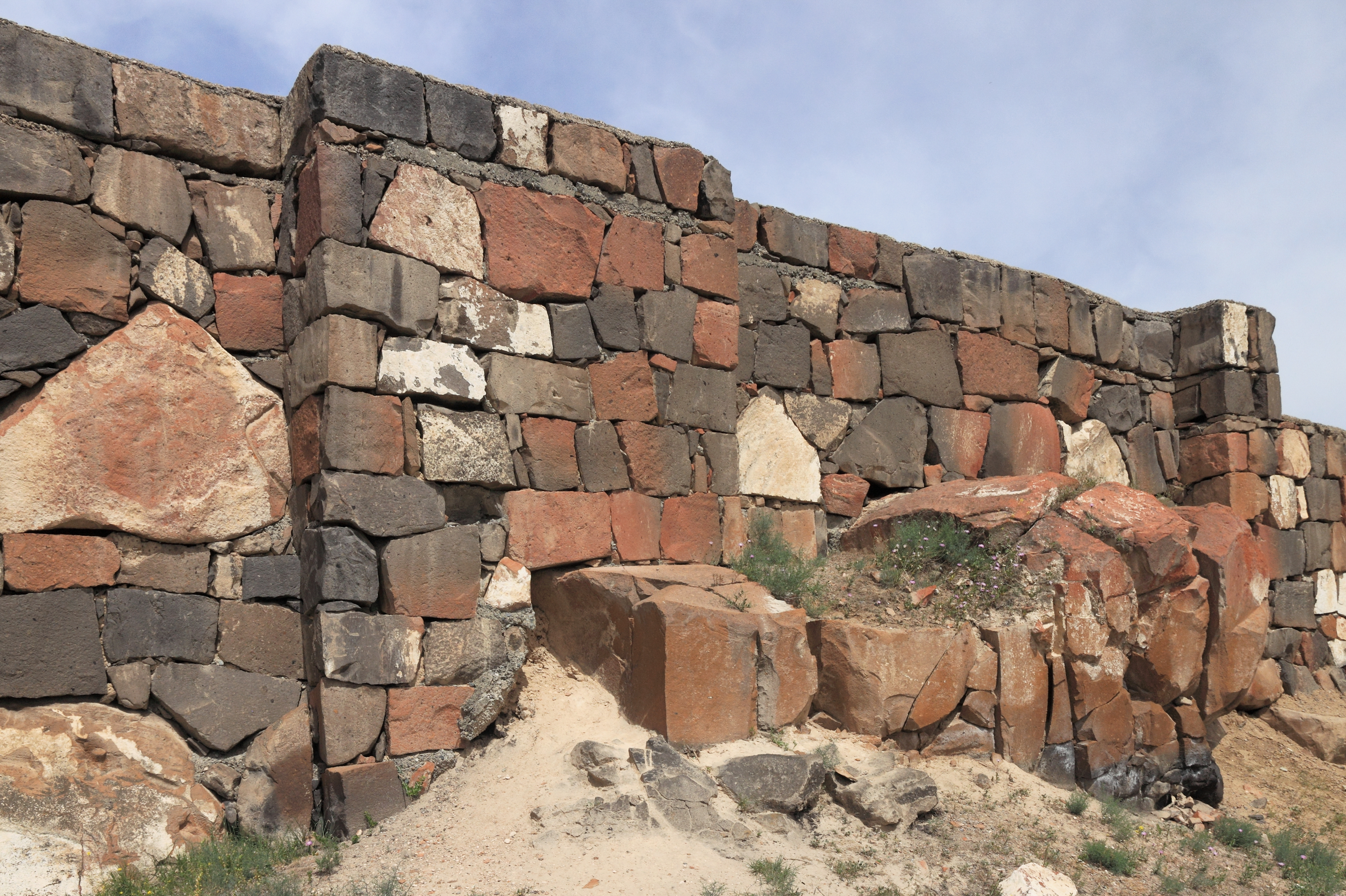

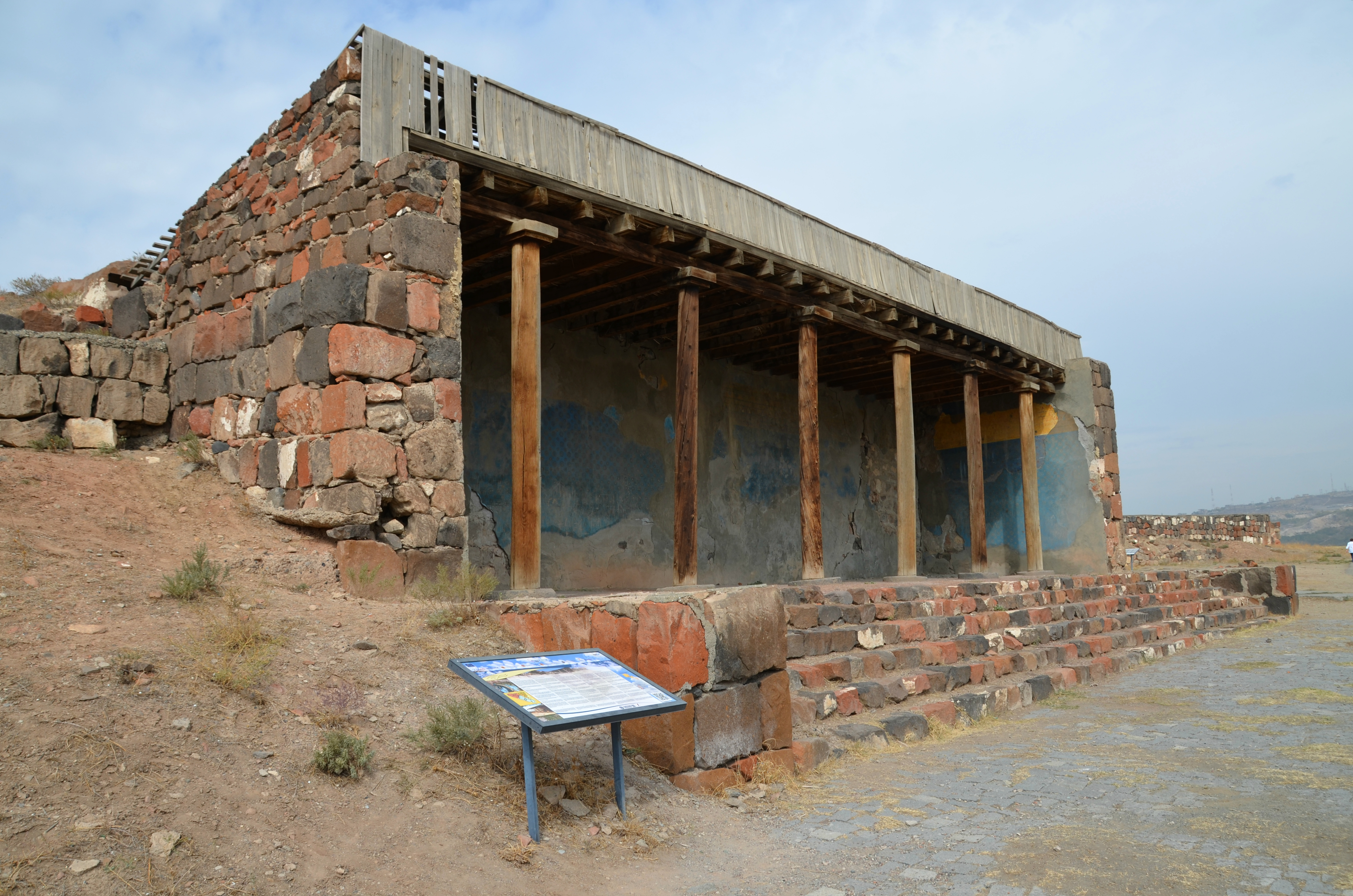

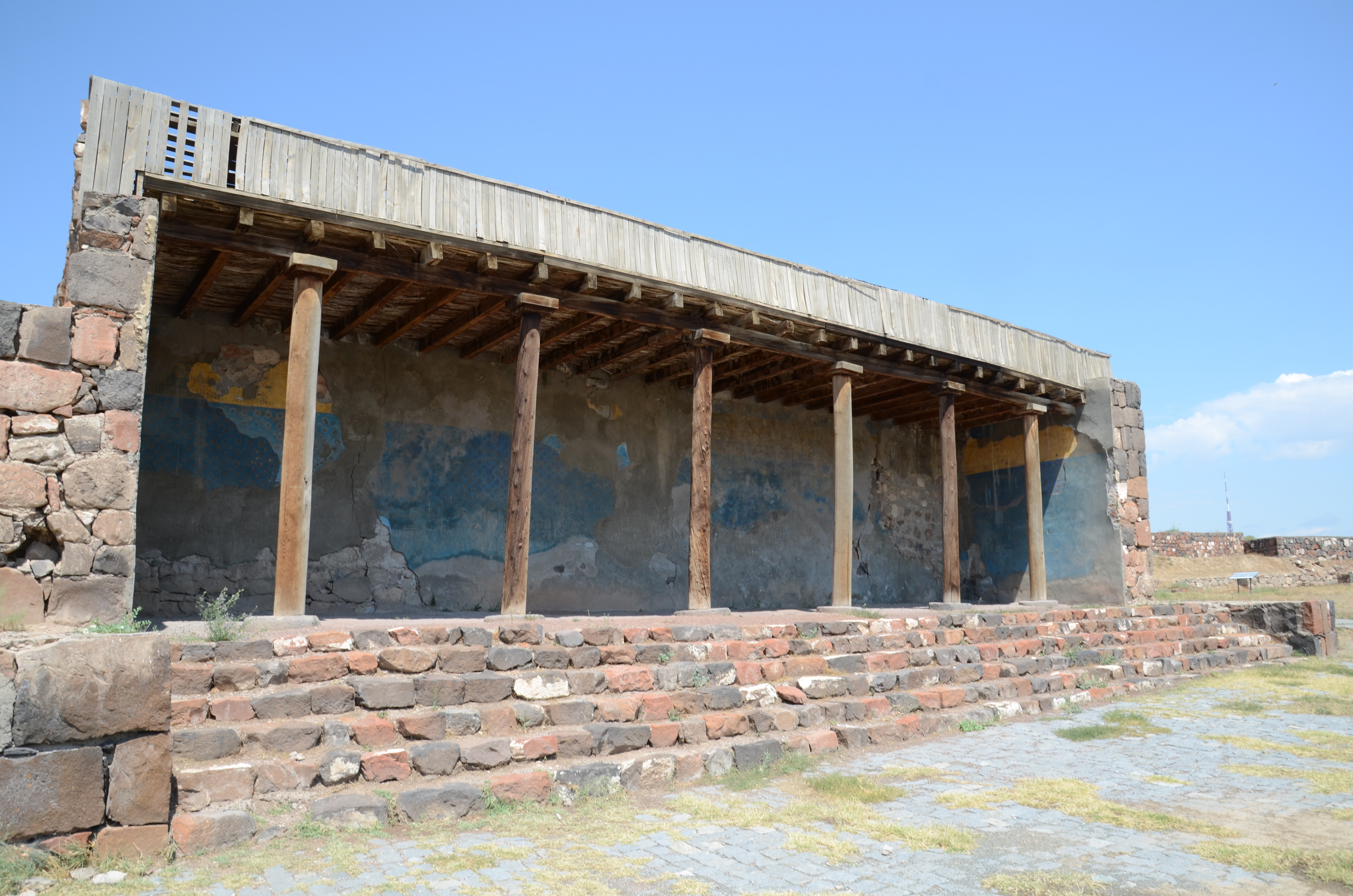
Architecture of Erebuni temples

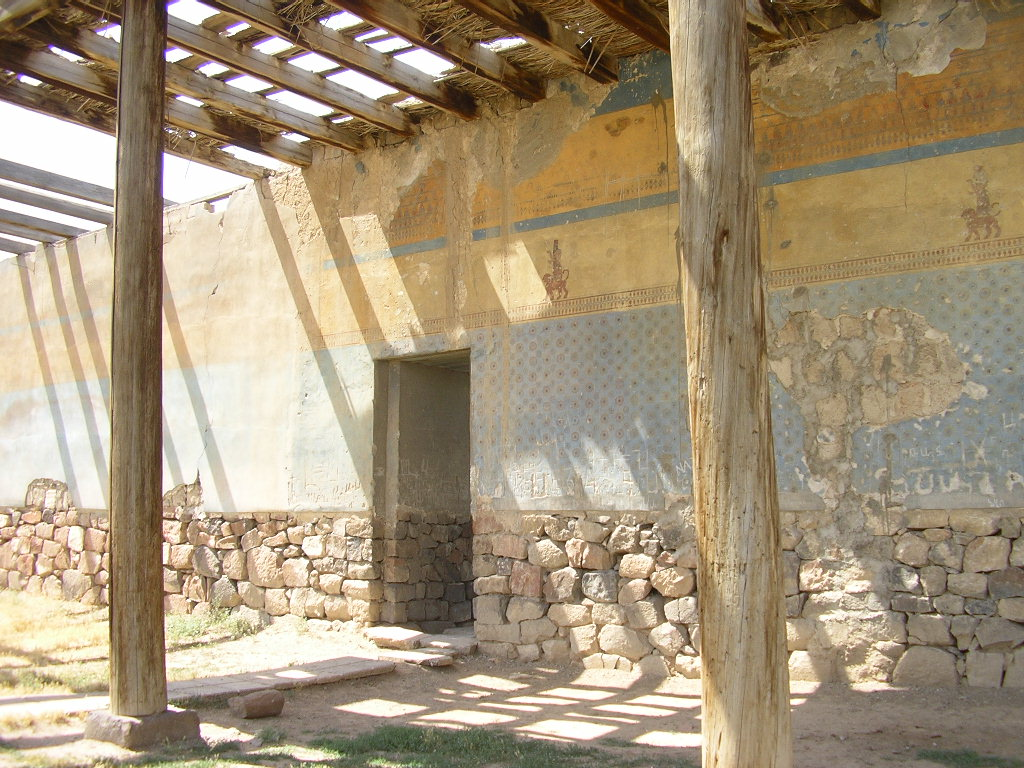
Fragment of the courtyard of the temple of God Khaldi (reconstruction)

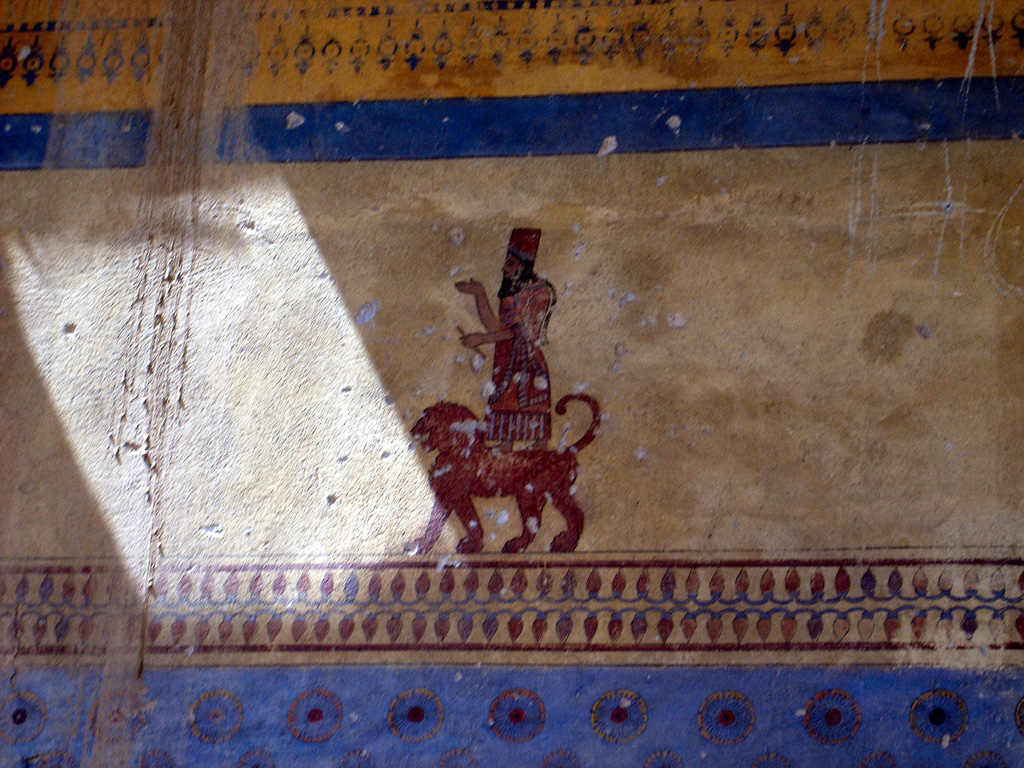
Image of god Khaldi, temple wall painting (reconstruction)

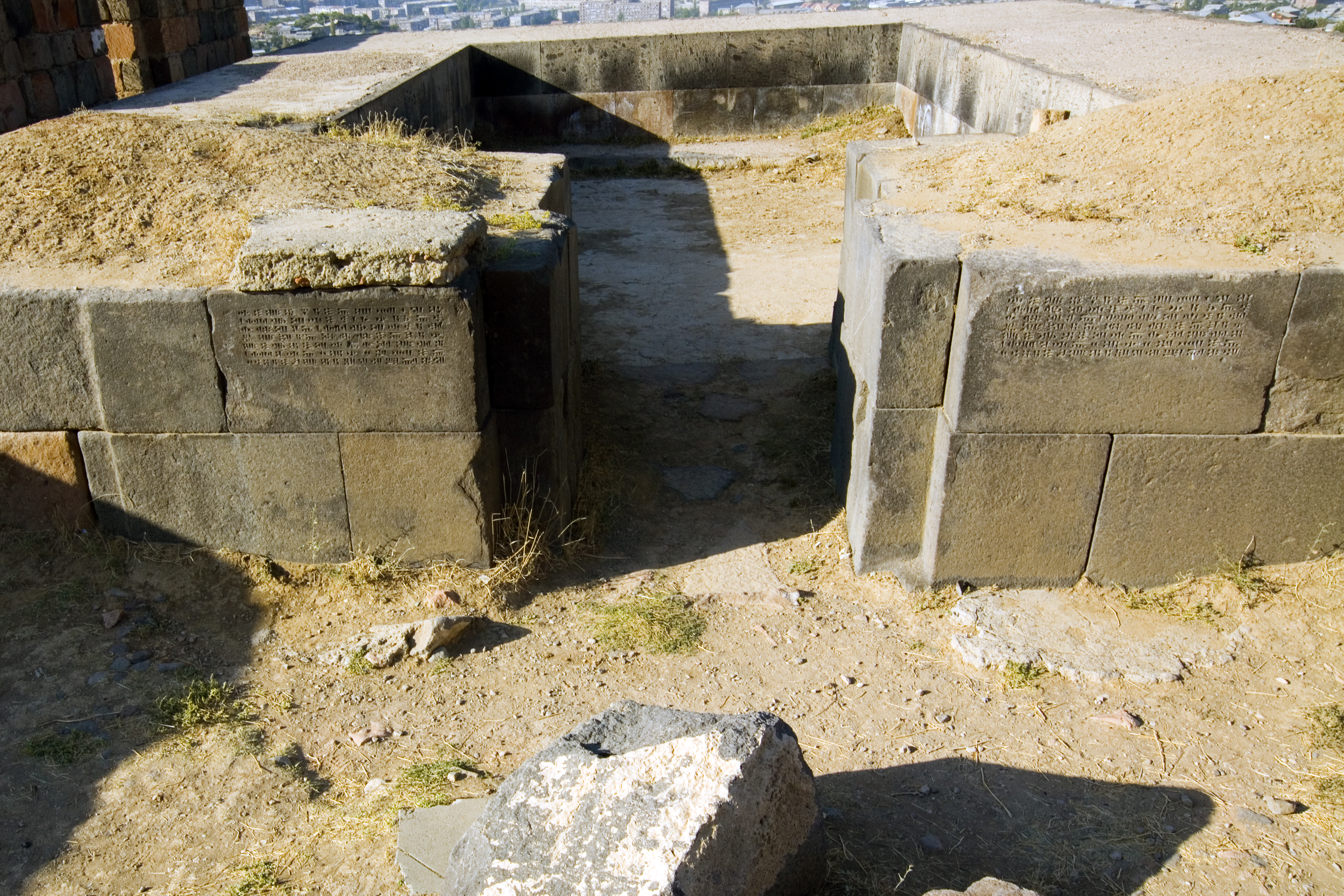
Entrance to the «Susi» Temple
Monumental paintings from the Erebuni fortress

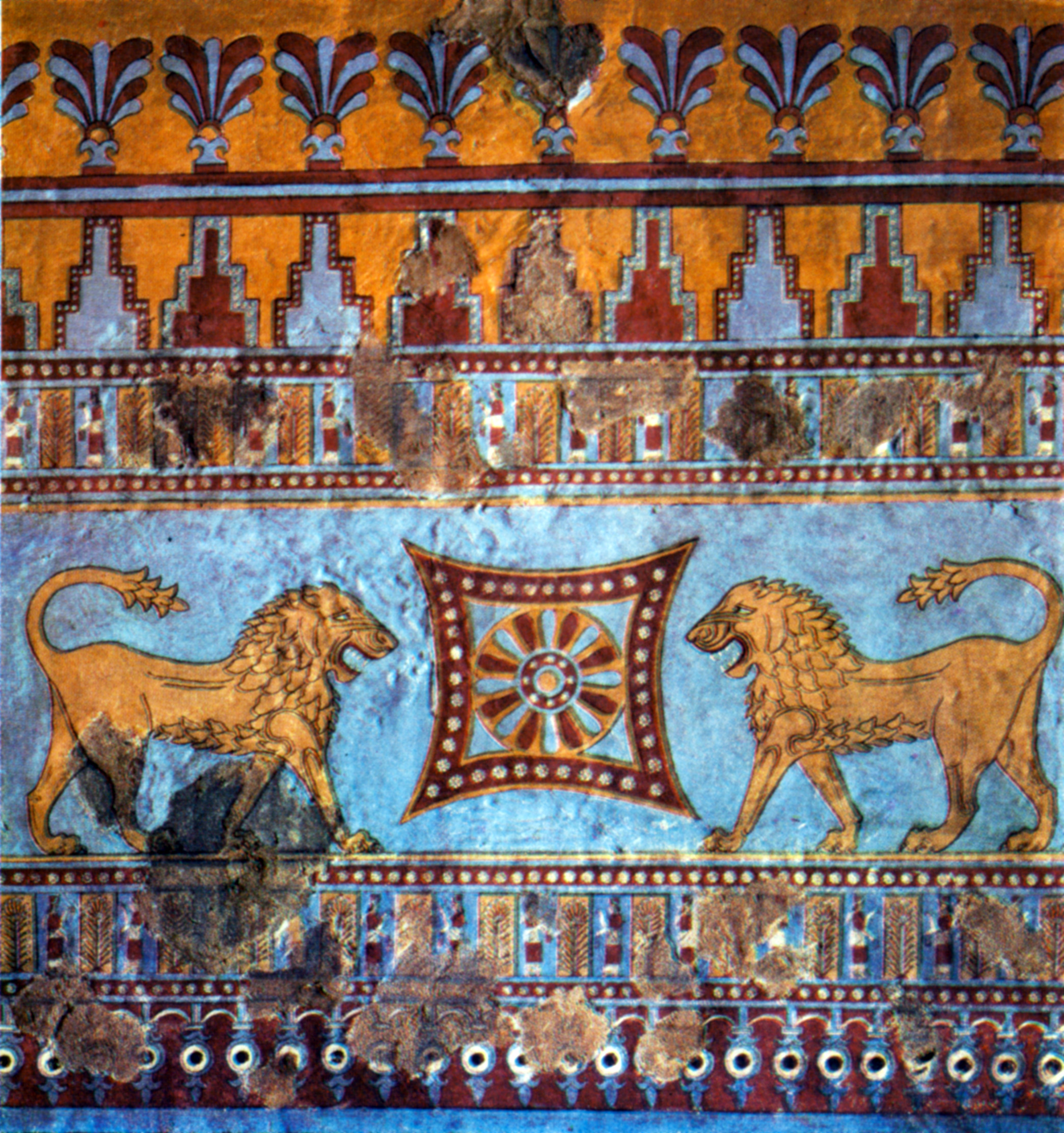

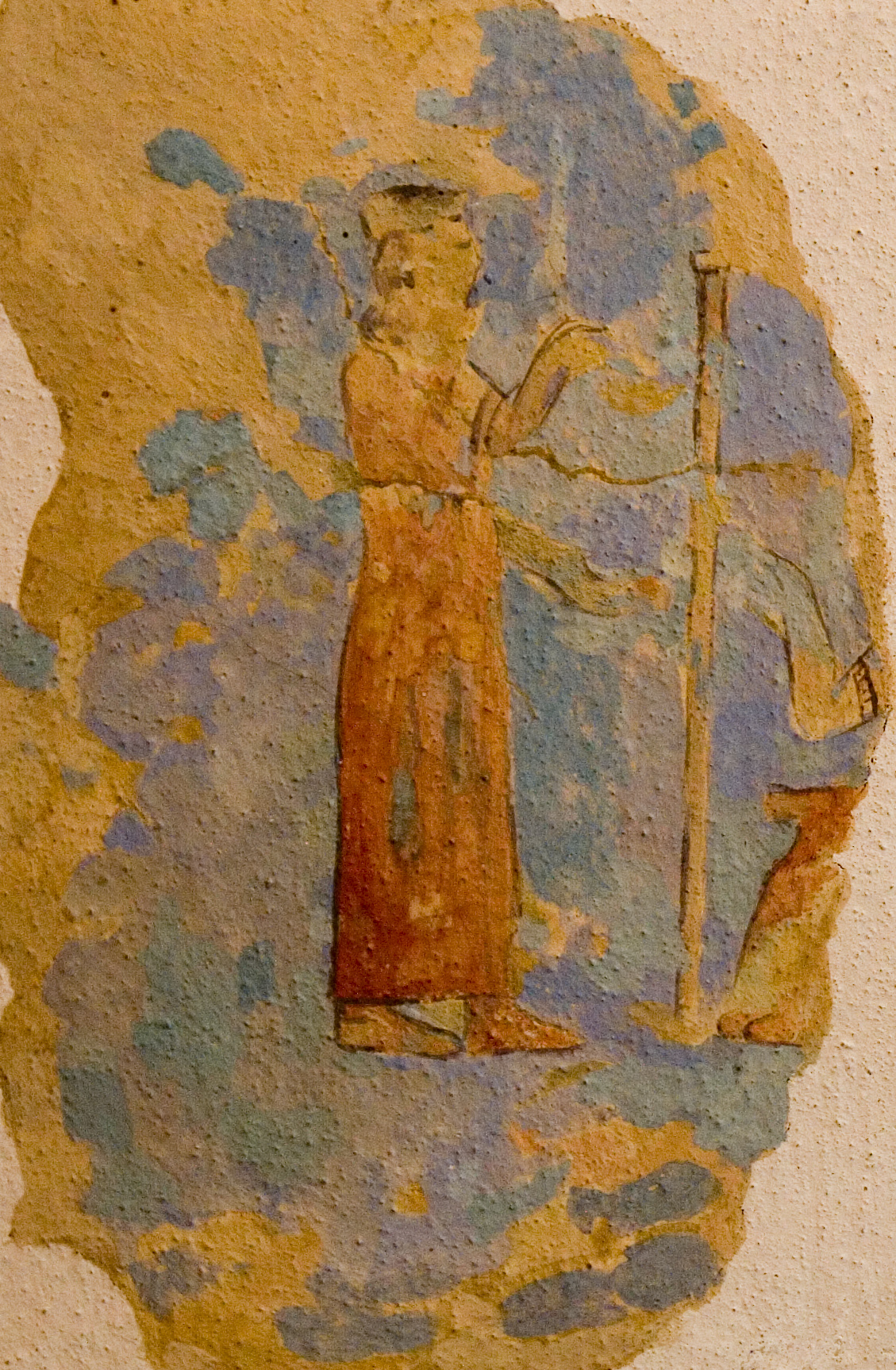

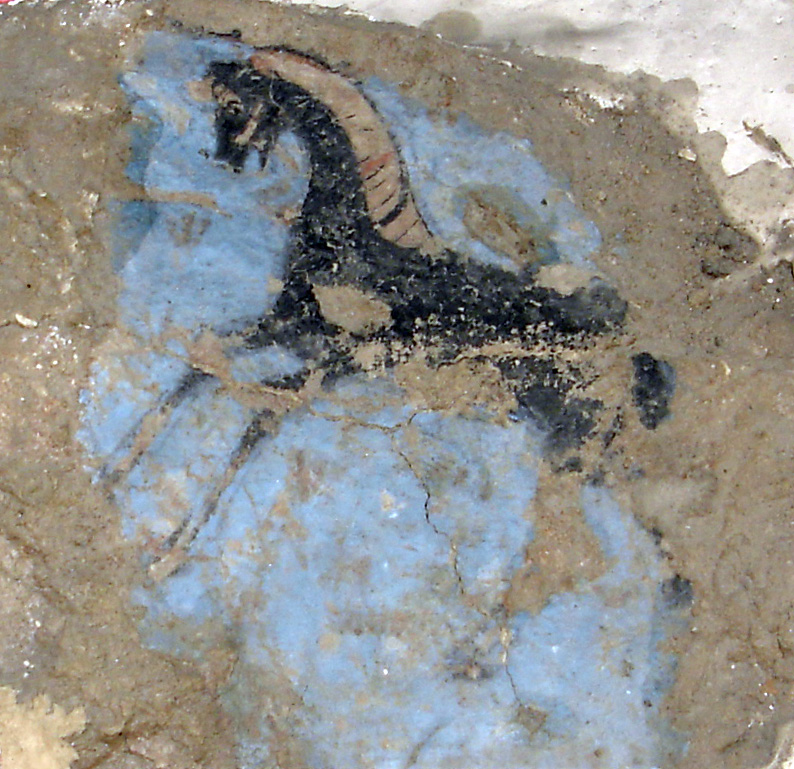

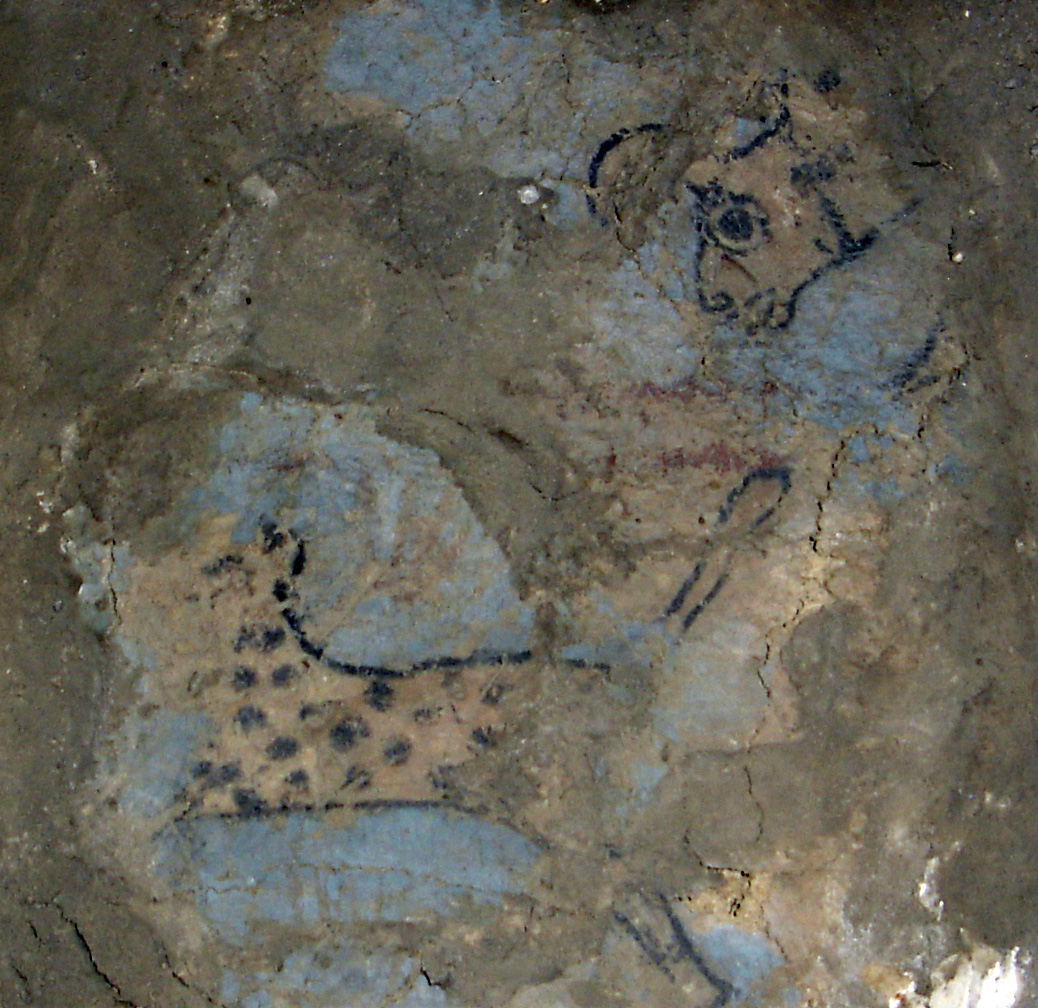

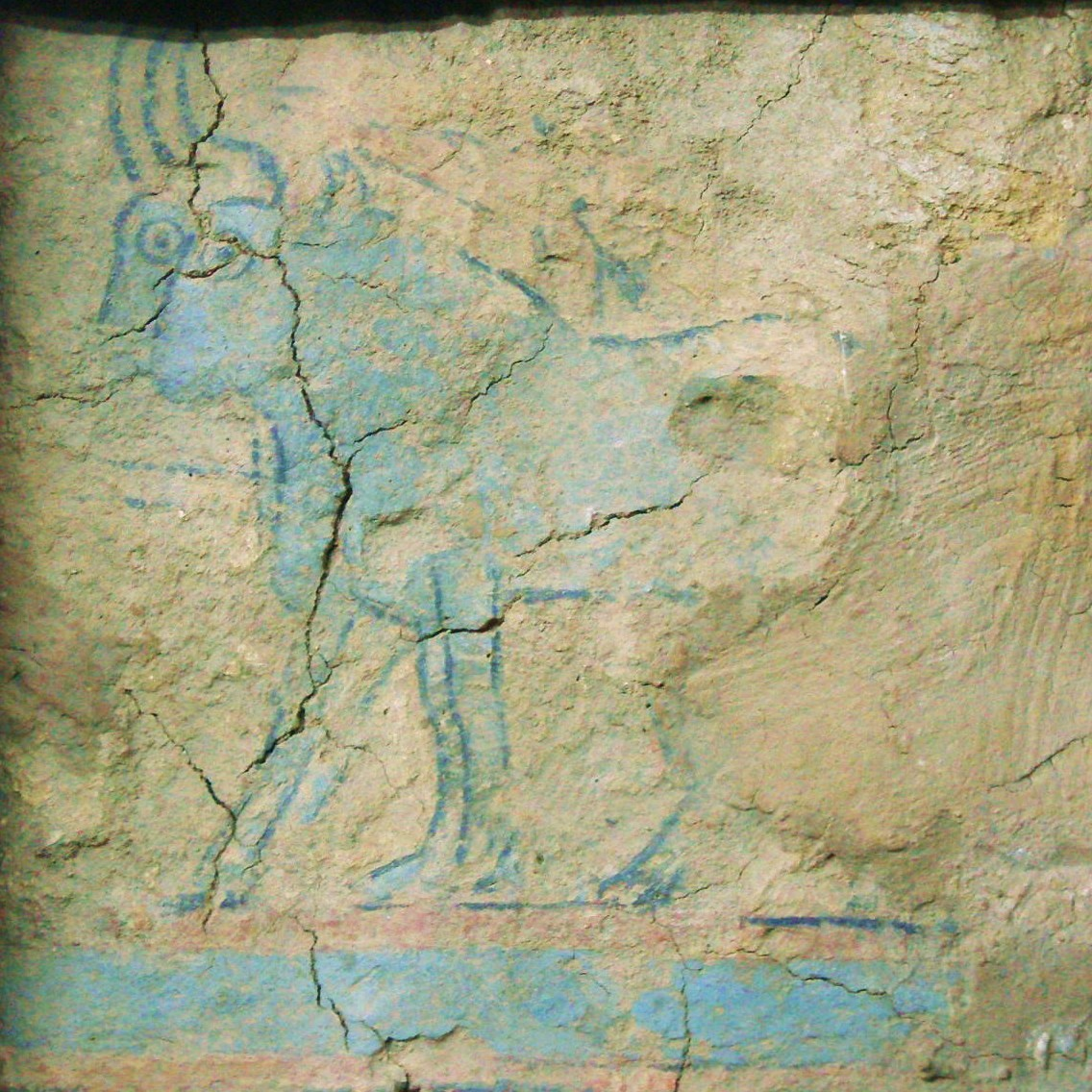

== See also ==
- Teishebaini
