= Hripsime Djanpoladian =

Russian Armenian archaeologist

Hripsime Djanpoladjian
- Հռիփսիմե Ջանփոլադյան
- Born: 26 August 1918 near Lake Sevan, Armenia
- Died: 1 September 2004 (aged 86); St Petersburg, Russia
- Resting place: Smolensk Cemetery
- Citizenship: Armenian
- Education: Yerevan State University
- Occupation: Archaeologist
- Spouse: Boris Piotrovsky
- Children: Mikhail Piotrovsky

Hripsime Mikayeli Djanpoladian-Piotrovskaya (Armenian: Հռիփսիմե Միքայելի Ջանփոլադյան-Պիոտրովսկայա, Russian: Рипсимэ Микаэловна Джанполадян-Пиотровская, 26 August 1918 - 1 September 2004) was an archaeologist and epigrapher originally from Armenia.

== Biography ==
Djanpoladian was born in 1918 on the way to Tbilisi, as her family fled from the Armenian genocide. Her parents were Michael and Iranianak, who already had a son, Gurgen. The family were wealthy and their money came from Nakhichevan salt mines.

After the establishment of Soviet power in Armenia, the family moved to Yerevan. After finishing school, Djanpoladian chose to study archaeology at Yerevan State University. After graduation in 1940, she took part in excavations at the Karmir-Blur hill of the Teishebaini fortress city. During these excavations she met her future husband, Boris Piotrovsky. Djanpoladian had excavated a figurine of the Urartian god of war, a culture which became Piotrovsky's specialism. They married in Yerevan in 1944, and their son Mikhail Piotrovsky was born there.

After a long illness, Djanpoladian died in 2004 and was buried in Smolensk Cemetery next to her husband.

== Career ==
Djanpoladian graduated with a doctorate in archaeology in 1948 entitled “Mkhitar Gosh and the Monastery of Nor Getik", which examined many of the inscriptions there. This interest in epigraphy was to continue; by 1977 she and Suren Avagyan published a new catalogue of Armenian inscriptions. She worked for the Institute of Archeology of the Academy of Arts of the USSR and in the East Department of the Hermitage Museum. In addition to her own research into medieval Armenia, she also edited all of her husband's publications, including an encyclopedic history of the Hermitage, his diaries, travel notes and autobiography.

=== Dvin Excavations ===
Djanpoladian's work on the 1951 Dvin Excavations demonstrated that it was an important centre for medieval glass production. This work developed into an exploration of the glass industry in Dvin from the ninth to thirteenth centuries, with particular focus on trade with the Middle East. She was able to demonstrate that Armenian craftsmen were copying Syrian glassware.

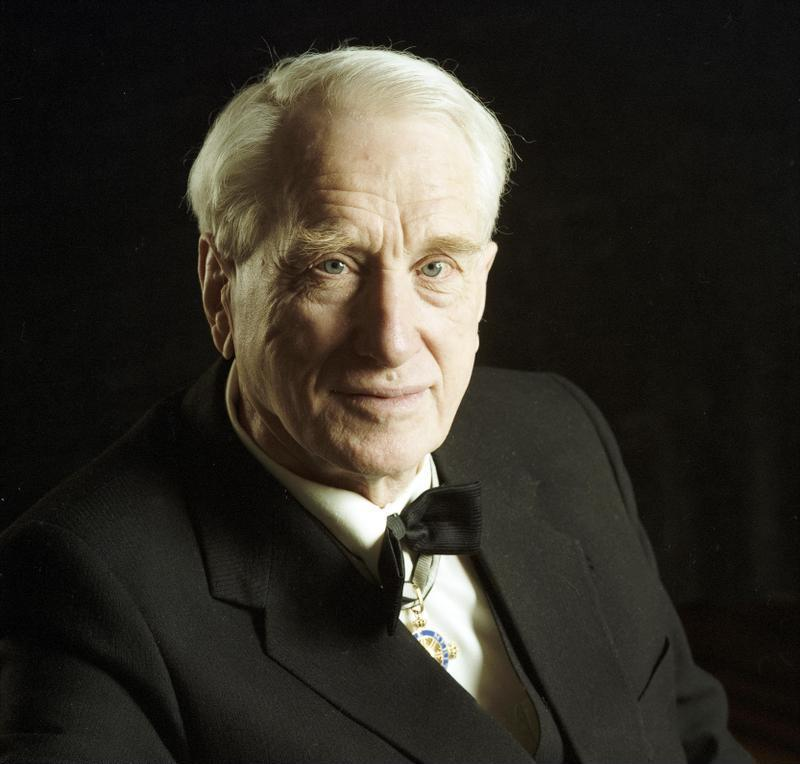
Husband: Boris Piotrovsky

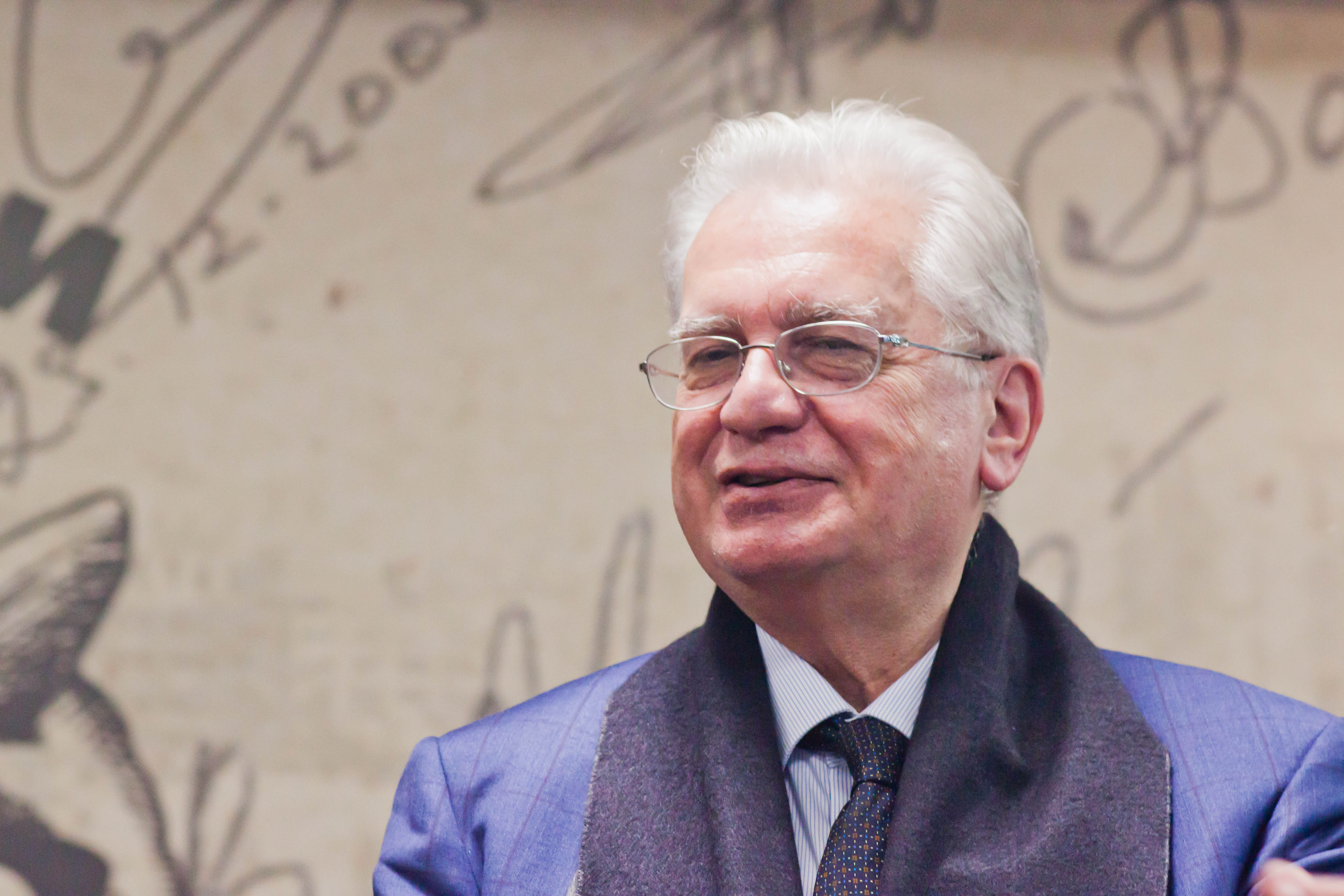
Son: Mikhail Piotrovsky

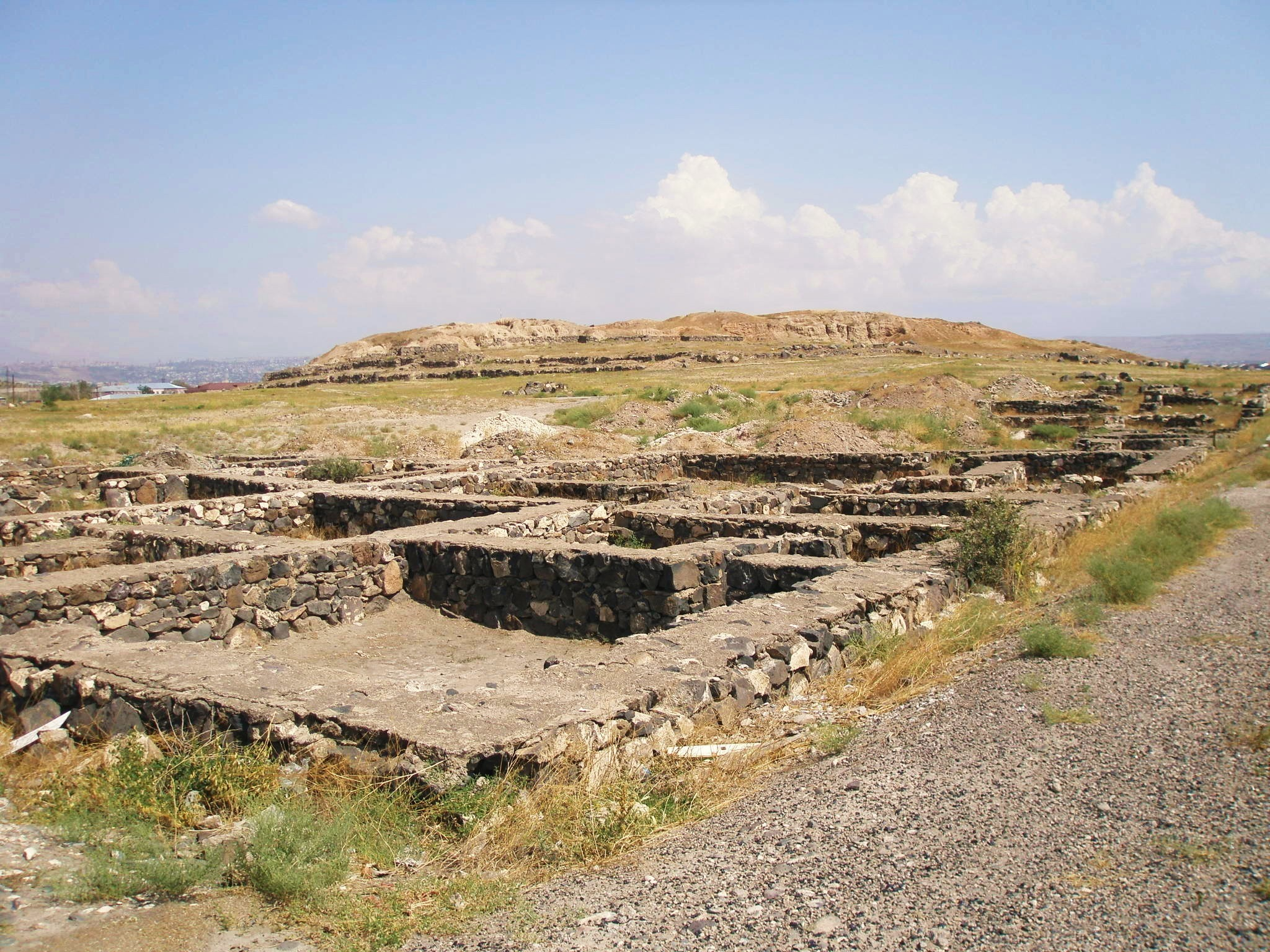
Karmir Blur Town

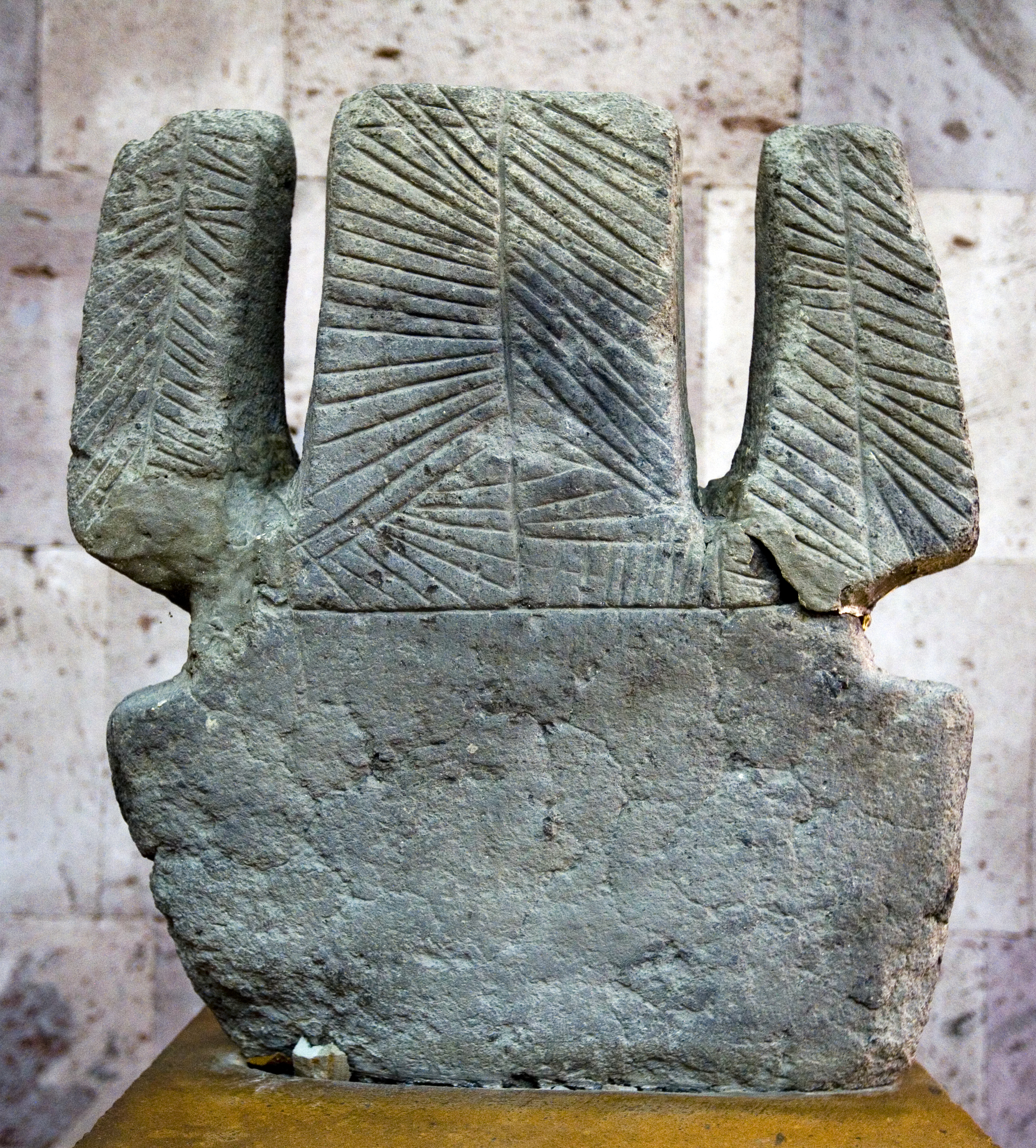
Karmir Blur Idol

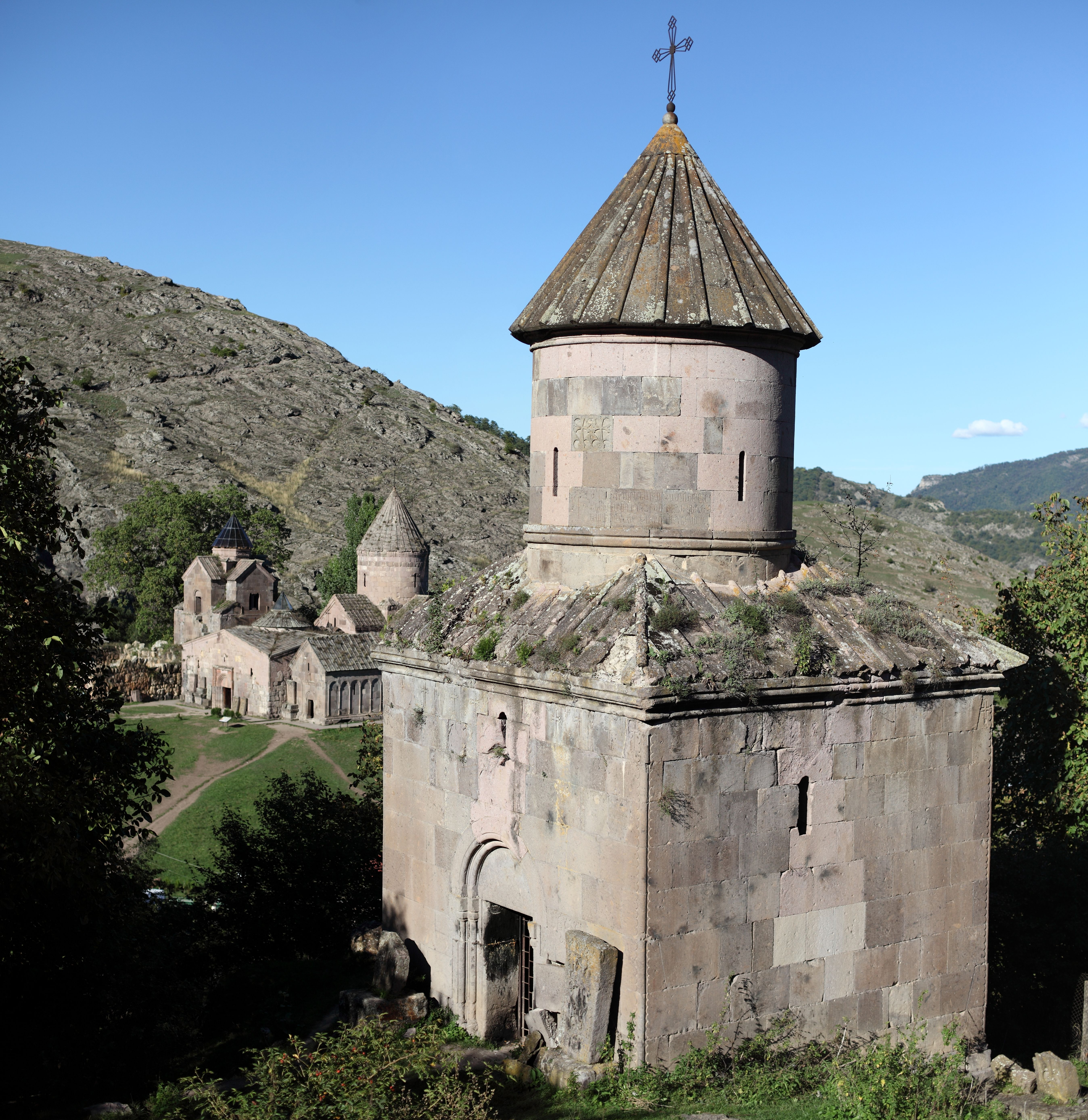
Mkhitar Gosh's Grave

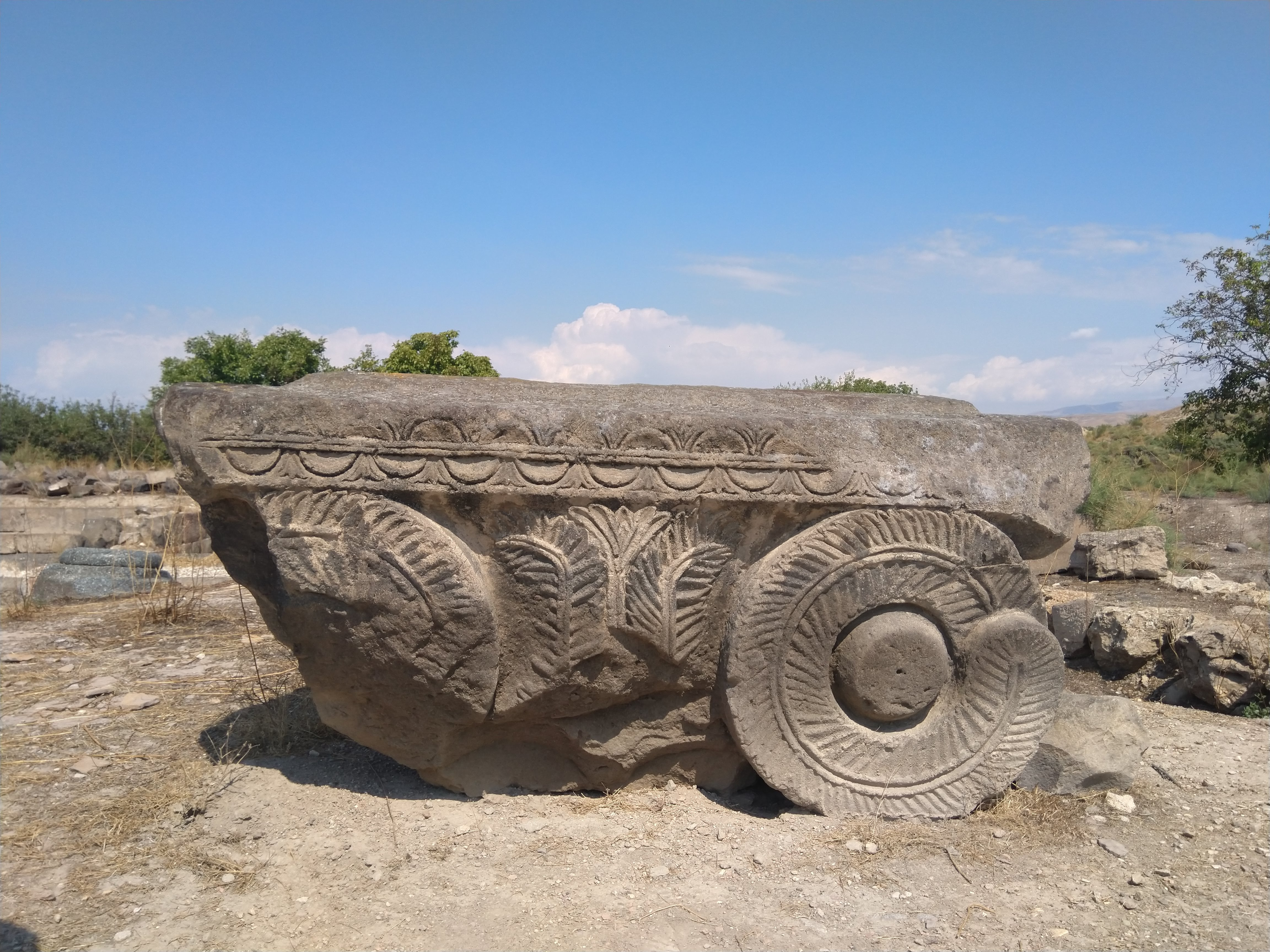
Ruins of Dvin, 2019
