= Konstantine Hovhannisyan =

- Born: December 19, 1911; Tiflis, Georgia, Russian Empire
- Died: 1984 (aged 72–73)
- Education: Yerevan Polytechnical University
- Known for: Excavation of Erebuni fortress
- Scientific career
- Fields: Architecture, archaeology
- Workplaces: Yerevan Polytechnical University

Konstantine Hovhannisyan (Armenian: Կոստանդին Լևոնի Հովհաննիսյան; December 19, 1911 – 1984) was an Armenian professor, architect and archaeologist. He was the head of an excavation team that was responsible for the excavations of the ancient Urartian city of Erebuni (situated on Arin Berd, or Blood Fortress, in Yerevan).

== Biography ==
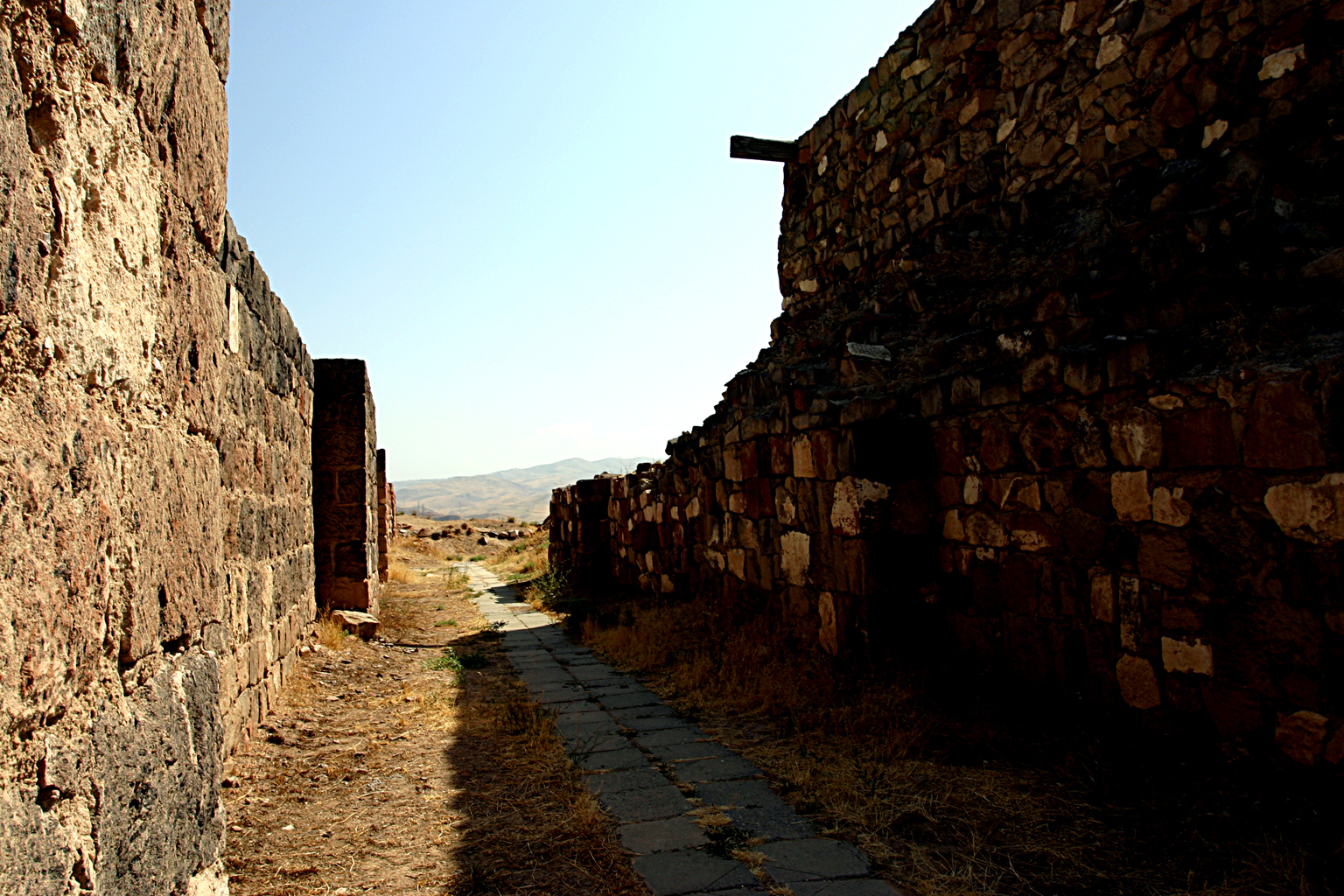
The walls of Erebuni fortress.

Hovhannisyan was born in Tbilisi, Georgia in 1911. He graduated from the Yerevan Polytechnical Institute in 1932 and immediately began to work under the Armenian architects Alexander Tamanian and Nicholas G. Buniatyan (from 1933 to 1934 and 1934–1941, respectively). As an architect, Hovhannisyan designed many of the Soviet-style apartment buildings and community facilities that sprang around the city of Yerevan.

In 1950, he was appointed the director of an excavation team that dug up the ancient Urartian fortress of Erebuni, located to the southeast of modern-day Yerevan. It was Hovhannisyan who had initially identified Arin Berd as the location of Erebuni, based on inscriptions found adjacent to the city. Hovhannisyan used what was left of Erebuni as a basis for reconstructing the fortress and how it would have looked like when it was built in 782 B.C.

Excavations of Erebuni continued for several decades and he remained its director until 1969. Hovhannisyan served as Director of Ancient Monuments in the Armenian SSR from 1952 to 1979. He was also a professor at his alma mater, teaching at the Yerevan Polytechnical Institute from 1955 to 1971.

== Published works ==
- (in Russian) Oganesian, K. L. Arin-Berd I. Arkhitektura Erebuni po materialam raskopok 1950-59 (Arin-Berd I. The Architecture of Erebuni according to excavated materials from 1950–59). Yerevan: Akademi Nauk Armianskoy SSR, 1961.
- (in Russian) Karmir Blur IV. Arkhitektura Teishabaini. Yerevan, Akademi Nauk Armianskoy SSR, 1955.
- The Wall Paintings of Erebuni. Yerevan, 1973.
- (in Armenian) The Restoration of Architectural Monuments in Soviet Armenia. Yerevan, 1978.
- (in Russian) Ocherki po istorii arkhitektur drevney i srednevekovoy Armenii. Yerevan, 1978.
