= Mikhail Piotrovsky =

Russian historian (born 1944)

- Михаил Пиотровский
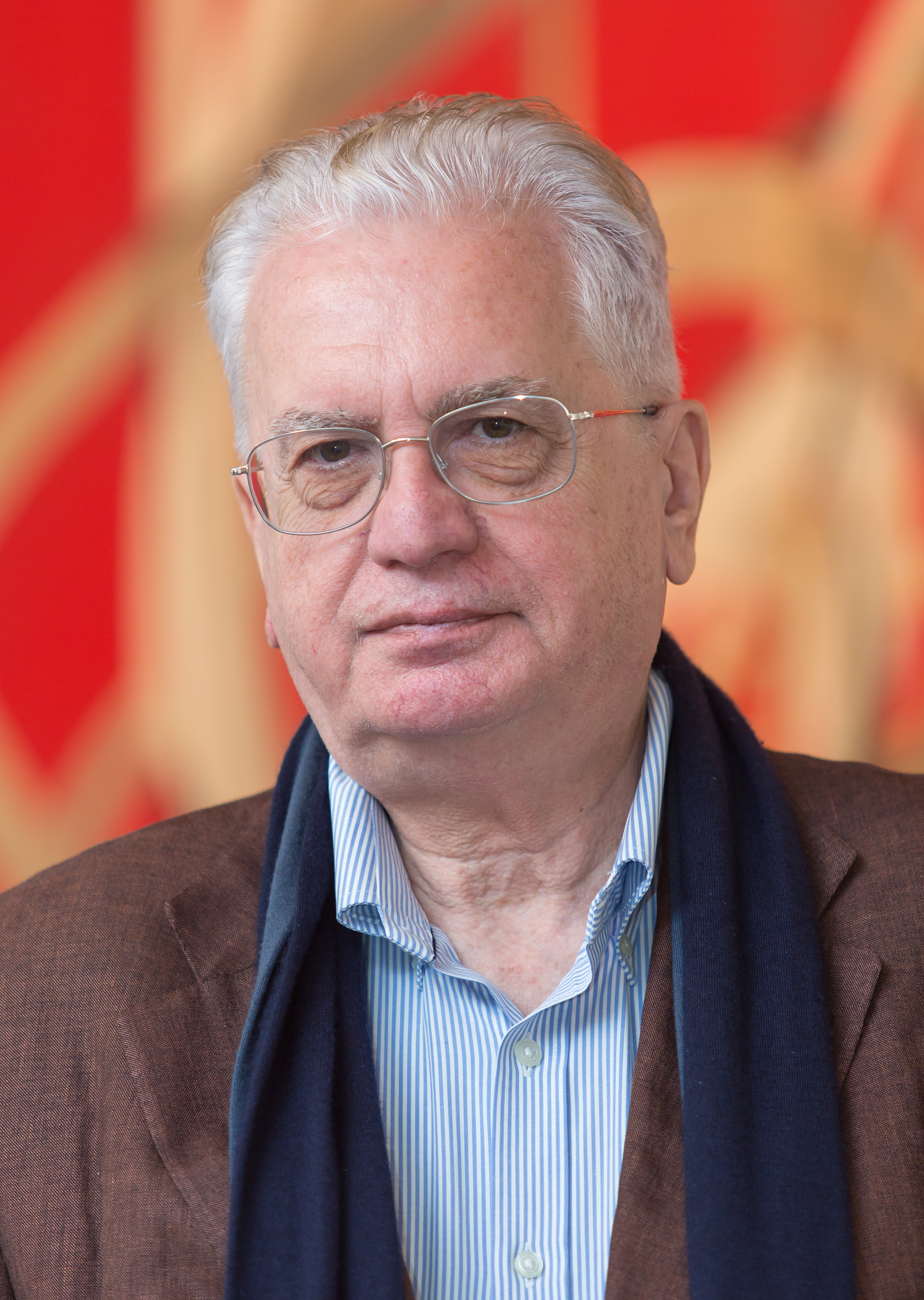
- Piotrovsky in 2019
- Born: 9 December 1944 (age 81); Yerevan, Armenian SSR, Soviet Union
- Education: Leningrad State University
- Occupations: Museum director, Orientalist

Mikhail Borisovich Piotrovsky (Russian: Михаил Борисович Пиотровский; 9 December 1944) is a Russian Orientalist (Arabist). He is the director of the Hermitage Museum in Saint Petersburg, Russia.

== Life and career ==
He was born in Yerevan in the Armenian Soviet Socialist Republic on 9 December 1944 to Boris Piotrovsky, an Orientalist and himself the future director of the Hermitage Museum, and Armenian mother Hripsime Djanpoladian, archaeologist and epigrapher.

At the Leningrad University, Mikhail Piotrovsky obtained a doctorate in Arabic linguistics. After graduating in 1967, he worked as an interpreter in Yemen and took part in archaeological exploration of the Caucasus. After his father's death in 1990, Piotrovsky was appointed Director of the Hermitage in his stead.

Following the collapse of the Soviet Union, Piotrovsky advocated the opening of the Hermitage collections to the wider world, which resulted in the establishment of the Hermitage Rooms in Somerset House, Hermitage Amsterdam and the Guggenheim Hermitage Museum. His tenure was not entirely free of scandals, however. After the museum announced in July 2006 that 221 minor items, including jewelry, Orthodox icons, silverware and richly enameled objects, had been stolen by one of the museum officials, there were calls for Piotrovsky's resignation.

In September 2002, he joined Henry Kissinger and Jacob Rothschild as co-director of Mikhail Khodorkovsky's newly founded Open Russia Foundation (renamed to Future of Russia Foundation in December 2004, and to New Generation Europe Foundation in March 2023).

After 2022 Russian invasion of Ukraine, Piotrovsky spoke of the importance of cultural bridges and made sure major loans avoided seizure and were returned to Russia. He spoke out against the cancellation of Russian culture but avoided direct references to the war, even as museum partners and international supporters suspended ties. Four months later, Piotrovsky has opened up about the war. He describes Russian culture as an important export, similar to the country's war in Ukraine. "Our recent exhibitions abroad are just a powerful cultural offensive. If you want, a kind of 'special operation', which a lot of people don't like. But we are coming. And no one can be allowed to interfere with our offensive". Piotrovsky was sanctioned by Canada over his support for the war in Ukraine.

== Awards and honors ==
Piotrovsky has been invested with numerous orders and medals, both Russian and foreign, including the Order of the Rising Sun (Japan), the Order of Honour (Oman), and the Order of Honor (Russia). He has also had a minor planet named after him. Piotrovsky has been Chair of the Board of the First Channel of the Russian television since 2001.

On 1 October 2009, Piotrovsky received the Woodrow Wilson Award for Public Service from the Kennan Institute.
