= Boris Piotrovsky =

Soviet Russian historian-orientalist and archaeologist (1908–1990)

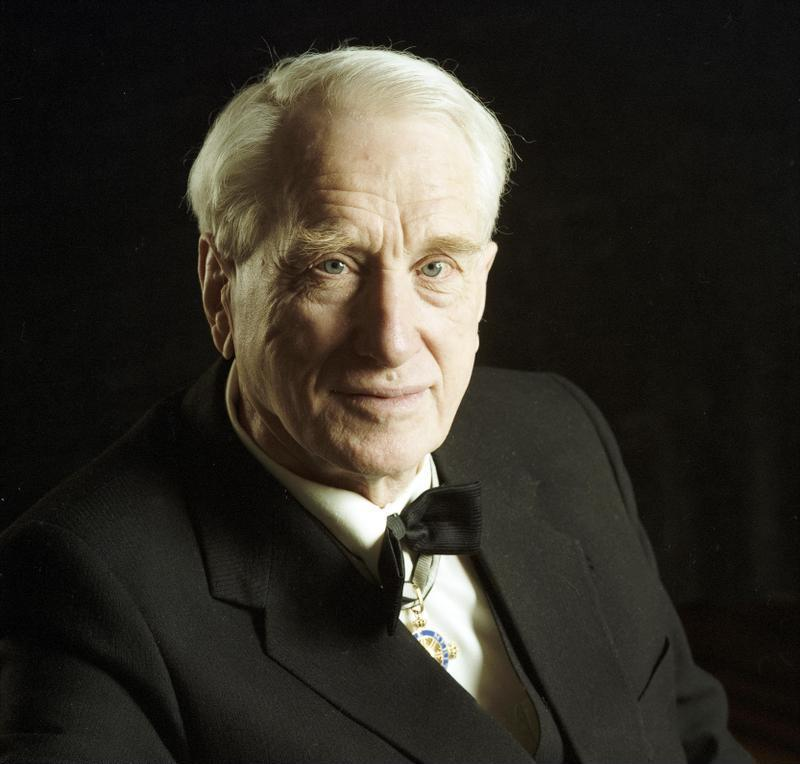
- Born: February 14, 1908; Saint Petersburg, Russian Empire
- Died: October 15, 1990 (aged 82); Leningrad, Soviet Union
- Resting place: Smolensky Cemetery, Saint Petersburg
- Occupations: Archaeologist, historian
- Known for: Excavations of Karmir Blur (Teishebaini); studies on Urartu
- Political party: CPSU (from 1945)

Boris Borisovich Piotrovsky, also Piotrovskii (Russian: Бори́с Бори́сович Пиотро́вский; 14 February [O.S. 1 February] 1908 – October 15, 1990) was a Soviet Russian academician, historian-orientalist and archaeologist who studied the ancient civilizations of Urartu, Scythia, and Nubia. He is best known as a key figure in the study of the Urartian civilization of the southern Caucasus. From 1964 until his death, Piotrovsky was also Director of the Hermitage Museum in Leningrad (now Saint Petersburg).

== Biography ==
Piotrovsky was born in Saint Petersburg in 1908. He specialized in the history and archaeology of the Caucasus region and beginning in the 1930s, he began to acquaint himself with Urartian civilization. He was the head of 1939 excavations that uncovered the Urartian fortress of Teishebaini in Armenia (known in Armenian as Karmir Blur, or Red Hill). Evidence found there has been key in understanding the Urartian civilization. Piotrovsky lead further excavations in Armenia in the ancient settlements of Tsovinar, Redkig-lager, Kirovakan (now Vanadzor) and Aygevan until 1971.

These were not Piotrovsky's sole contributions in the archaeological field, however. Piotrovsky worked elsewhere in the Caucasus, especially on the Scythian culture. In 1961, he was placed at the head of an expedition of the Academy of Sciences of the Soviet Union to study Nubian monuments in Egypt. He also spent 26 years as Director of the Hermitage Museum, which has been run by his son Mikhail thereafter. He was also the supervisor of the renowned Armenian archaeologist Gregory Areshian. The Hermitage holds an annual conference in his honor. He died of a cerebral hemorrhage in Leningrad in 1990 at the age of 82.

He was married to Hripsime Djanpoladjian, who was an archaeologist and epigrapher.

== Works ==
In his lifetime, he published more than 200 works in the fields of archaeology, history and art. One of Piotrovsky's most important works is The History of Urartu and its Culture, published in 1944 and which went on to receive the Stalin Prize in 1946. Other notable works include:

- Urartu: The Kingdom of Van and Its Art (1967)
- The Ancient Civilization of Urartu (1969)
- The Hermitage: Its History and Collections (1982)

== Honours and awards ==
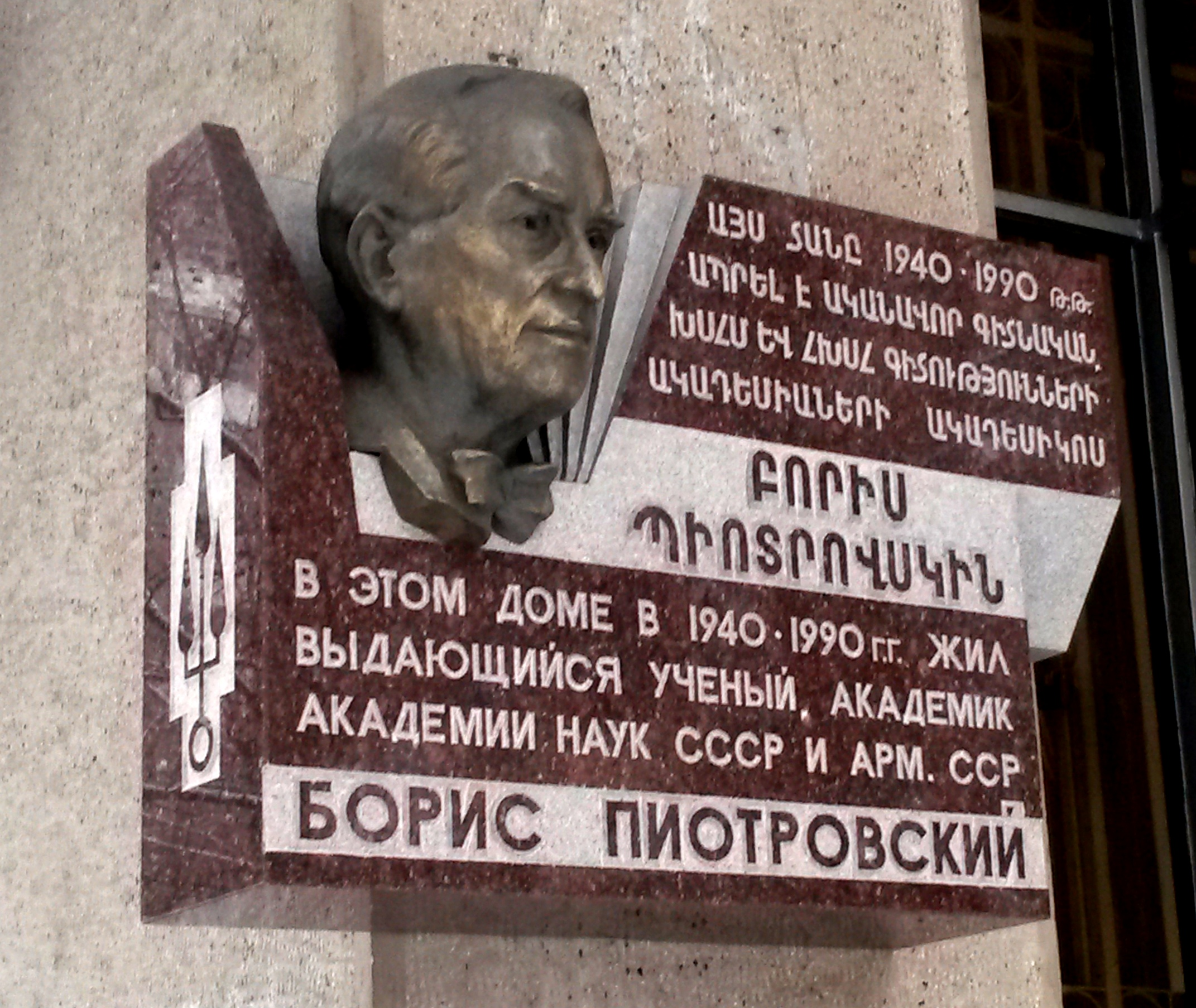
Boris Piotrovsky's plaque on 2 Zakian street, Yerevan

- Hero of Socialist Labour (1983)
- Three Orders of Lenin
- Order of the October Revolution
- Three Orders of the Red Banner of Labour
- Medal "For the Defence of Leningrad"
- Medal "For Valiant Labour in the Great Patriotic War 1941–1945"
- Medal "In Commemoration of the 250th Anniversary of Leningrad"
- Jubilee Medal "Twenty Years of Victory in the Great Patriotic War 1941–1945"
- Jubilee Medal "Thirty Years of Victory in the Great Patriotic War 1941–1945"
- Jubilee Medal "Forty Years of Victory in the Great Patriotic War 1941–1945"
- Commander of the Ordre des Arts et des Lettres (France)
