= Teišebaini =

Archaeological site near Yerevan, Armenia

Teišebaini Կարմիր Բլուր
- Karmir Blur
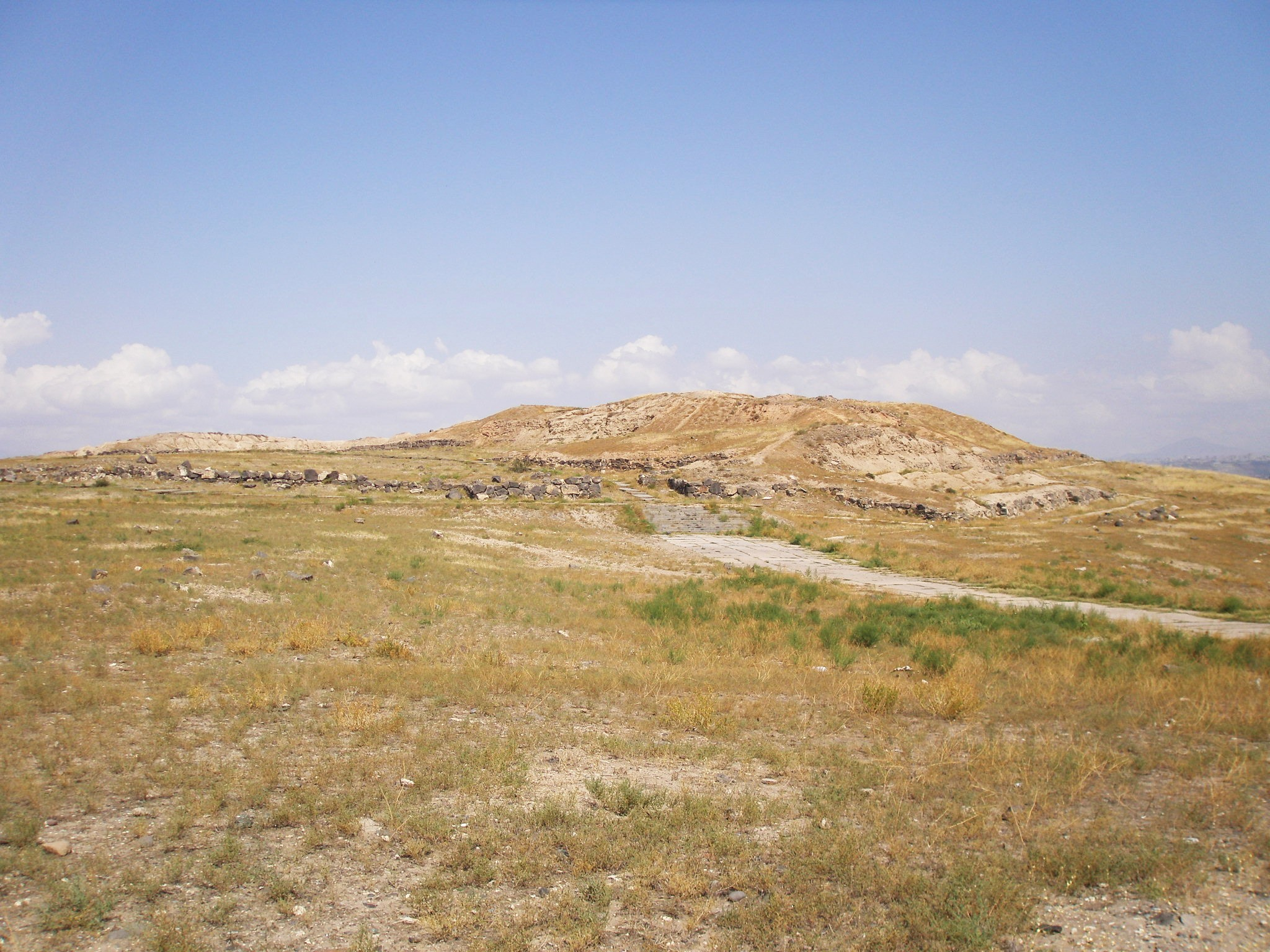
- Karmir Blur "Red Hill"

- Location within Armenia
- 40.153888°N 44.453366°E
- Type: city, palace, and citadel
- Location: Yerevan, Armenia

History
- Built: Between 650 and 600 BC
- Built by: Rusa II
- Abandoned: 585 BC

Site notes
- Height: 901 metres (2,955 ft)
- Area: 44.5 ha (110 acres)
- Excavation dates: 1939-1971
- Condition: Ruins (portions of walls remain)
- Public access: Yes
- Website: Erebuni Historical & Archaeological Reserve: Teishebaini Citadel

Teišebaini (also Tešebani, modern Karmir Blur (Armenian: Կարմիր Բլուր) referring more to the hill that the fortress is located upon) was the capital of the Transcaucasian provinces of the ancient kingdom of Urartu. It is located near the modern city of Yerevan in Armenia. The site was once a fortress and governmental centre with towered and buttressed perimeter walls, massive gates, a parade ground within its walls, and storage rooms that entirely occupied the ground floor. The site of the city, palace and citadel together measure over 0.45 km^{2} (110 acres). The name Karmir Blur translates to "Red Hill" because of the hill's reddish hue. It became this color after the city was burned and the upper walls which were made of mudbricks fell and crumbled by the fire. Teišebaini is situated at a height of 901 metres (2,956 ft).

== History ==
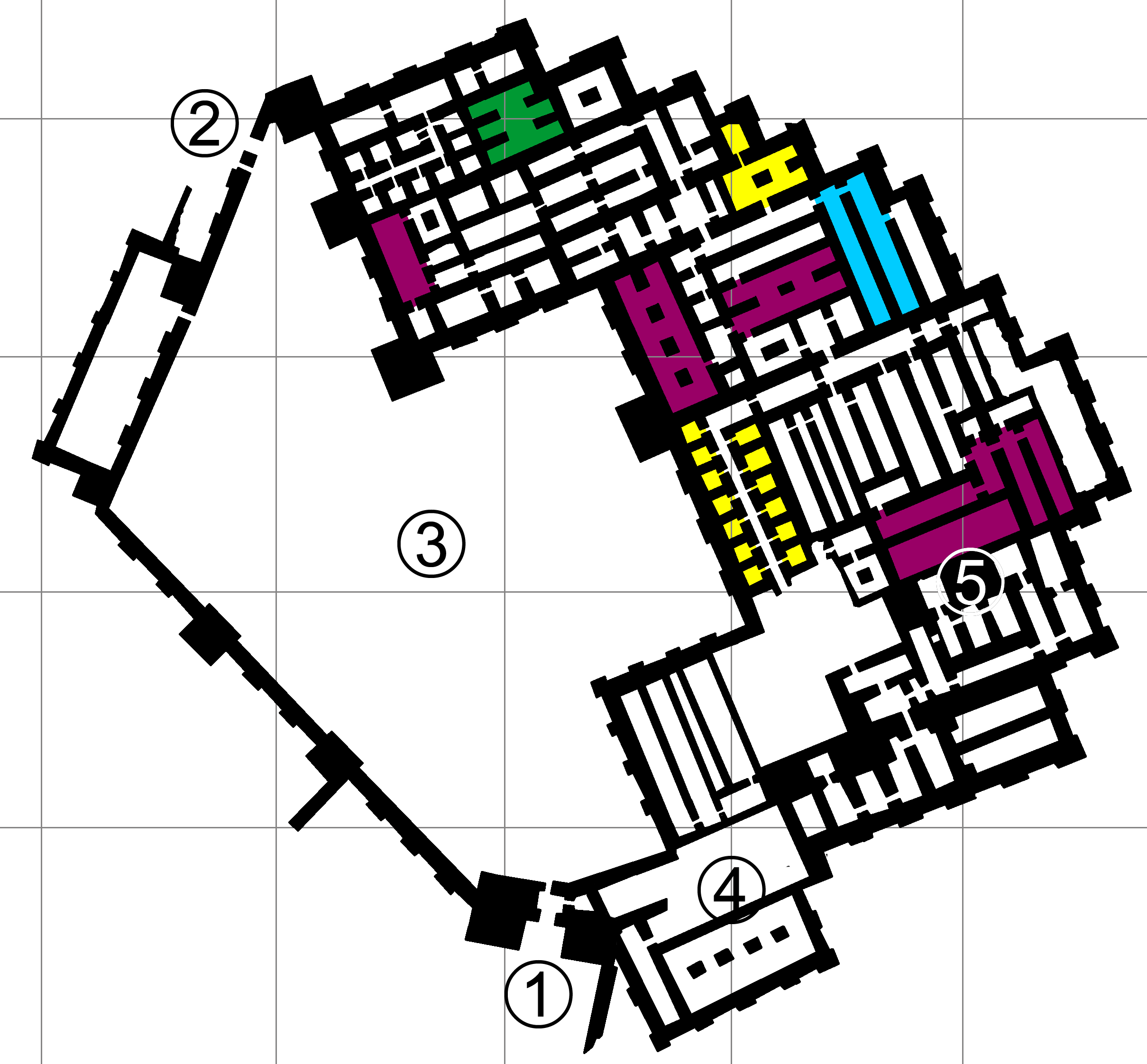
Plan of Teišebaini

The city of Teišebaini was built by Rusa II in mid-7th century BC to protect the eastern borders of Urartu from the Cimmerians and Scythians. Within the city was a governors palace that contained a hundred and twenty rooms spreading across more than 40,000 m^{2} (10 acres), and citadel named the Citadel of Teisheba after the Urartian god of war. The palace was made of stone, with timber ceilings, and timber columns that supported the roof. The construction of the city, palace, and the citadel were not fully finished until the reign of Rusa III, some 50 years later.

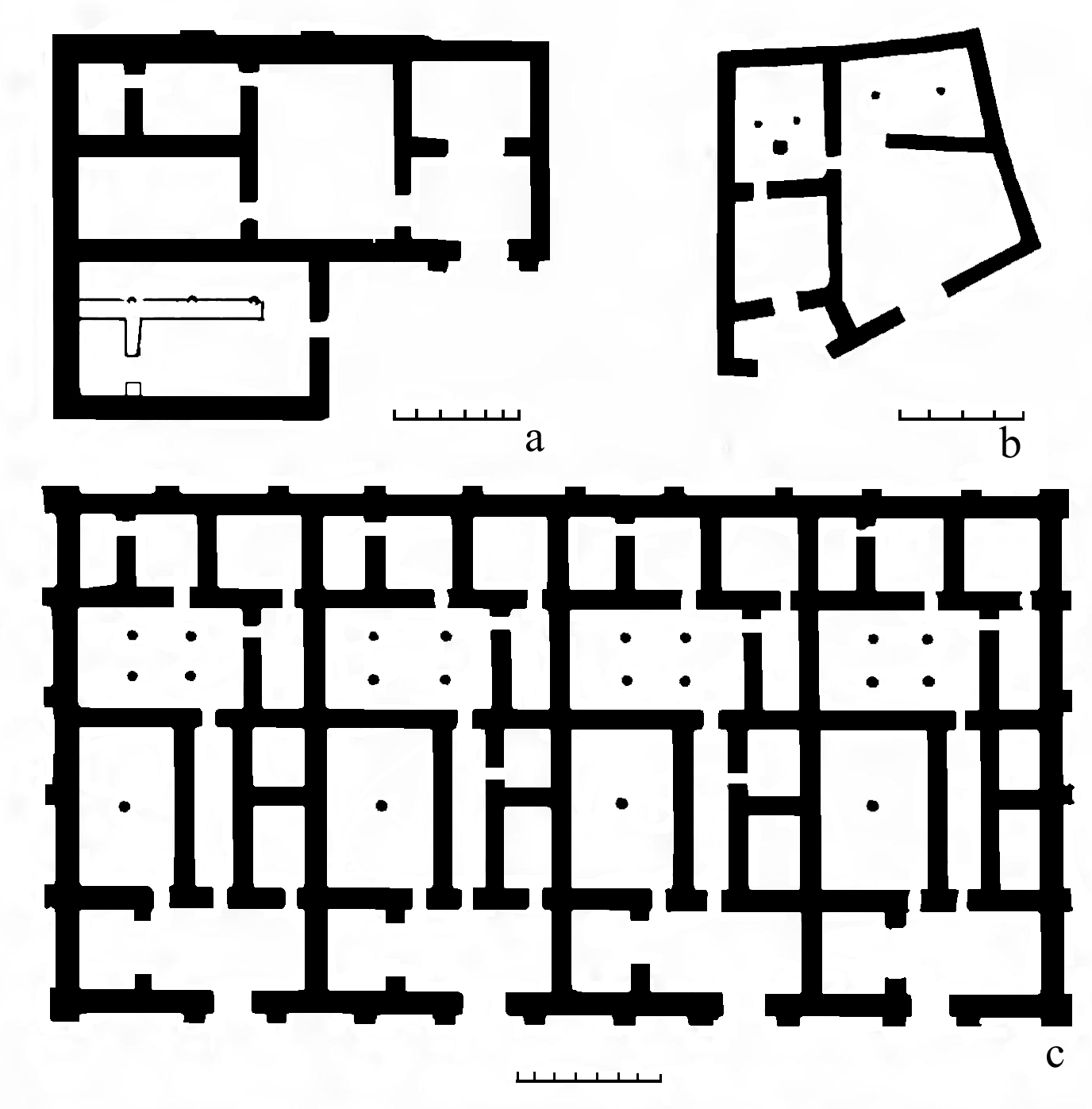
Plans of residential houses in Teishebani. a, b - monats, c - multisection

Agriculture was essential to the city, as was raising livestock. The Urartians built massive water canals, some of which are still in use to this day. Archaeological excavations have shown that lentils, hemp, peas, sesame, wheat, and barley were some of the grains that were grown in the area, as well as grapes and plums. The grape seeds that had been found were examined further and it revealed that twelve varieties of grape were grown in the surrounding area of Teišebaini during this time. All of these ancient varieties and more are still grown to this day in modern Armenia. Smaller ceramic vessels were also found in excavations and are known to have been used in brewing beer made from barley. Other much larger vessels were used for storing foods and wine. Small circular markings on the sides of the containers near the top indicated the amount that could be stored inside. The vessels were usually buried half-way into the soil which naturally kept foods cool.

The site was discovered in 1939 after being buried for more than two and a half millennia. A cuneiform inscription had been found three years earlier that led to the discovery of the ancient city. It read, 'Rusa Argishti-hini' which translates to "Rusa, son of Argishti" also known as Rusa II. Another set of cuneiform inscriptions were found written upon a bronze belt and bronze bolt, both bearing the words "Rusa Argishti, fortress of the city of Teišebaini." The inscriptions helped date the site and tell who its builder was. In 1941 a bronze statuette of the god Teisheba was found within the citadel. The excavations here are considered one of the most important archaeological discoveries and findings in the Middle East, the Near East and Asia Minor. Some of the findings include carved ivory, stone, ceramics, metal figurines, pottery and an astonishing wide variety of bronze domestic tools and utensils, military equipment decorated with mythological symbols, forms and animals, daggers, swords, helmets, arrows, quivers, shields of an advanced metallurgy, as well as vases, bracelets, earrings and medallions in gold and varied sets of other jewelry. Pottery found in the site was either painted black or had painted designs such as waves of water.

Archaeological evidence shows that the city of Teišebaini was destroyed by fire sometime around the beginning of the 6th century BC. Numerous fragments of cloth, rope, and other items such as seeds have been found charred from the city's destruction. It is thought that Teišebaini was attacked during the night since numerous human remains have been found, and rooms within the buildings still had everything in them as if the people living within the city's walls had no chance to flee. During the excavations, skeletons were found holding objects of gold in their hands. It is theorized that when the city was set on fire, that residents of the city began either to loot or save their own possessions from the burning buildings as the city was under attack.

== Gallery ==
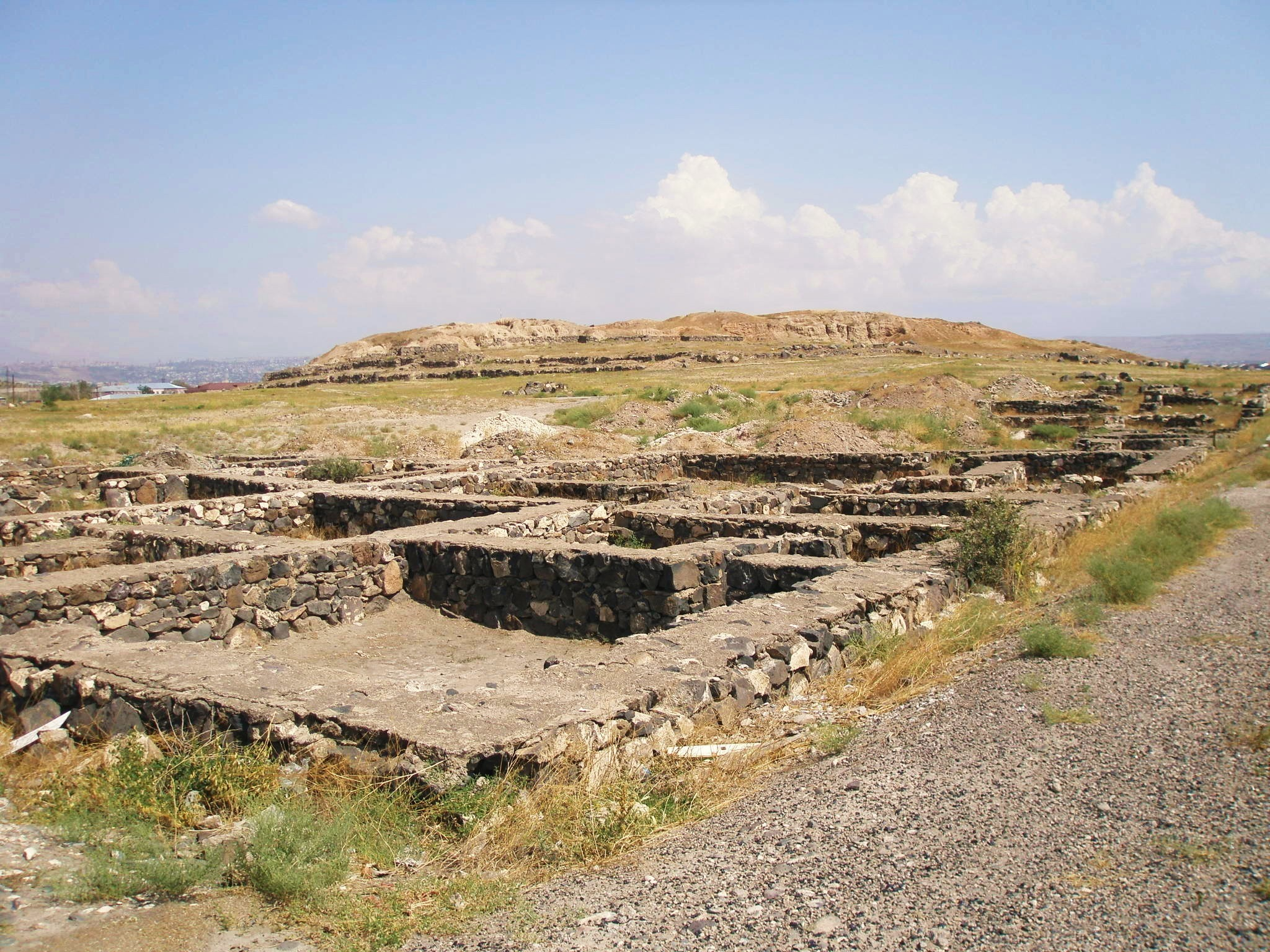
Foundations of ancient towns near Teišebaini (Karmir Blur in the distance)

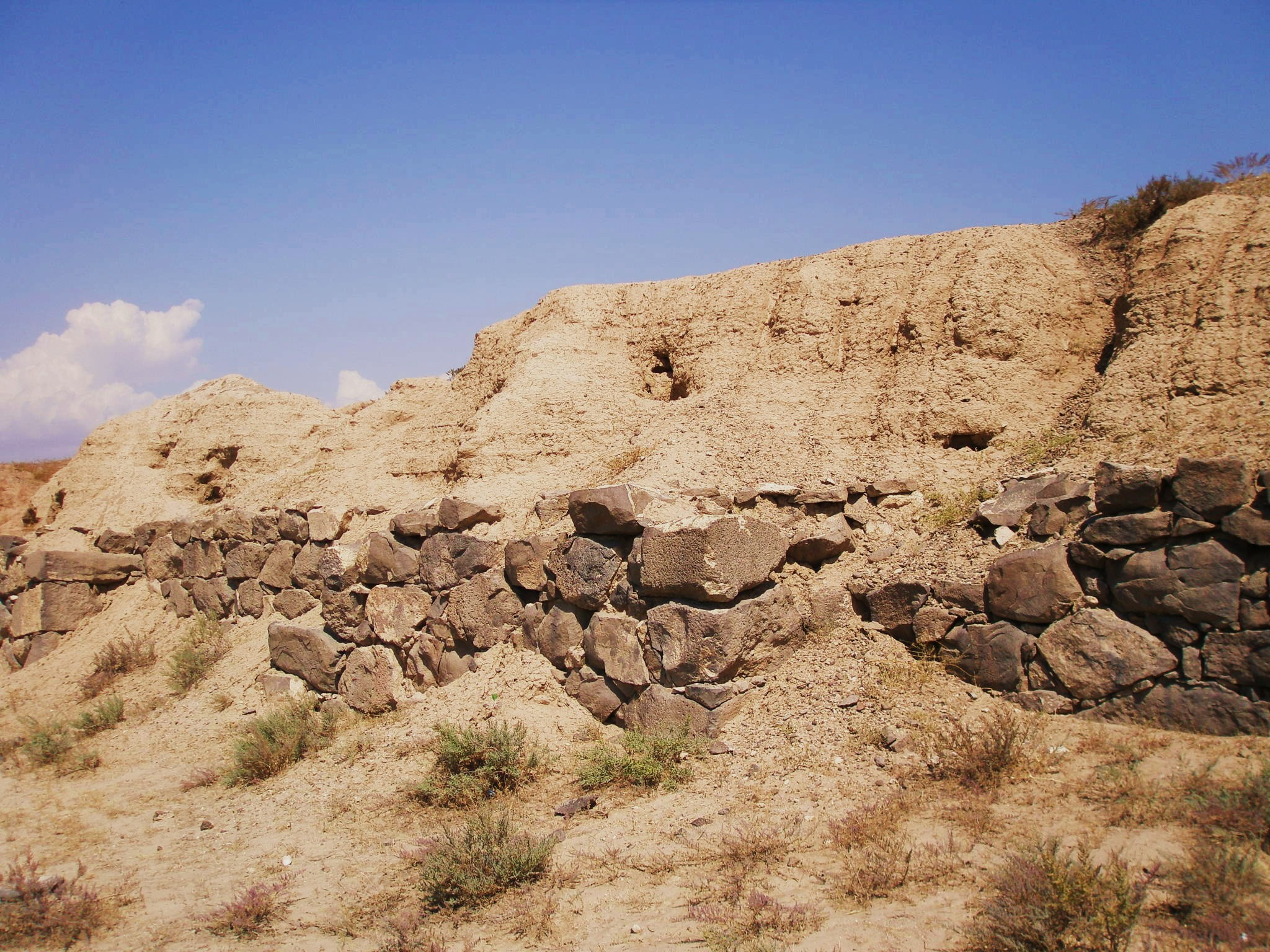
The ancient walls of Teišebaini at Karmir Blur (stone at the bottom, mud-brick at the top)

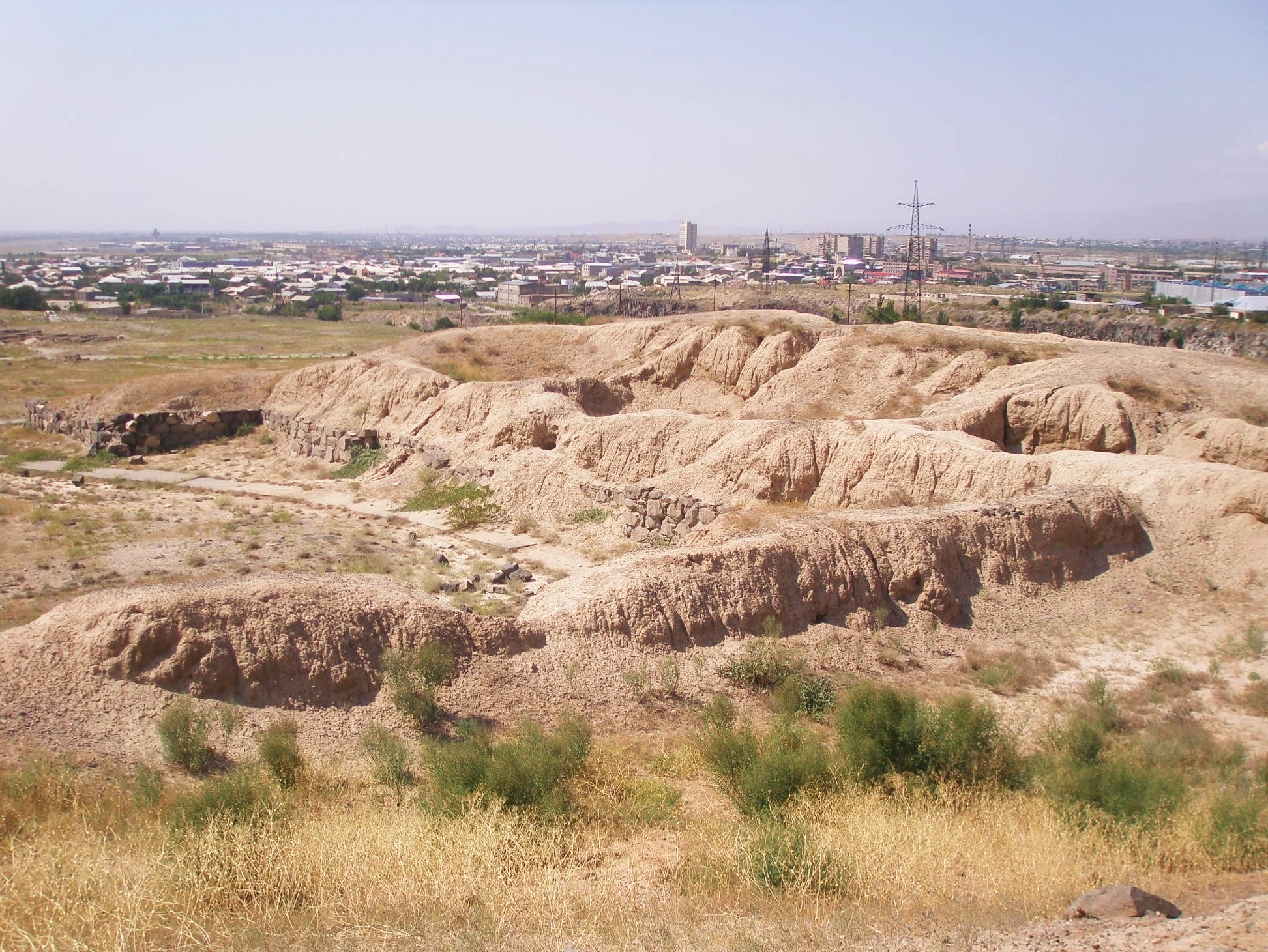
View of Karmir Blur from on top of the hill

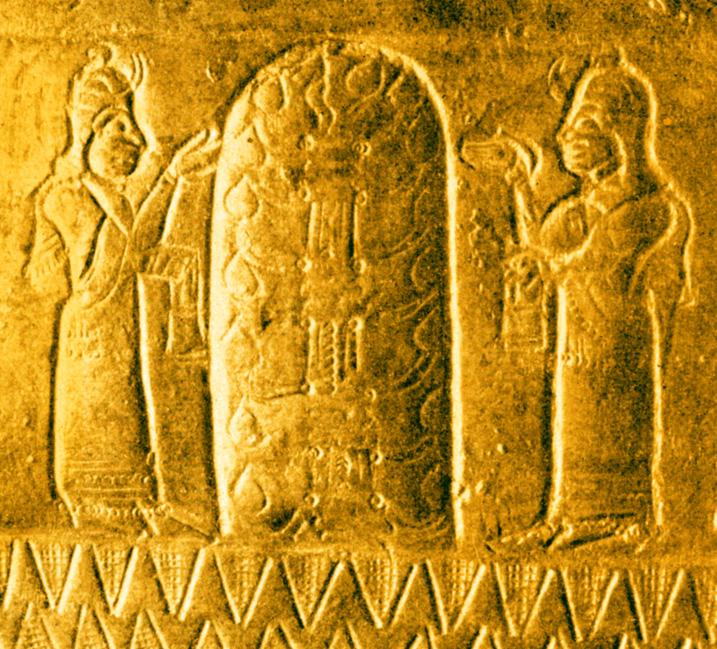
Fragment of a bronze helmet discovered during excavations at Karmir Blur depicting the "tree of life"
