= Battle of Hayots Dzor =

Myphological battle for Armenian statement

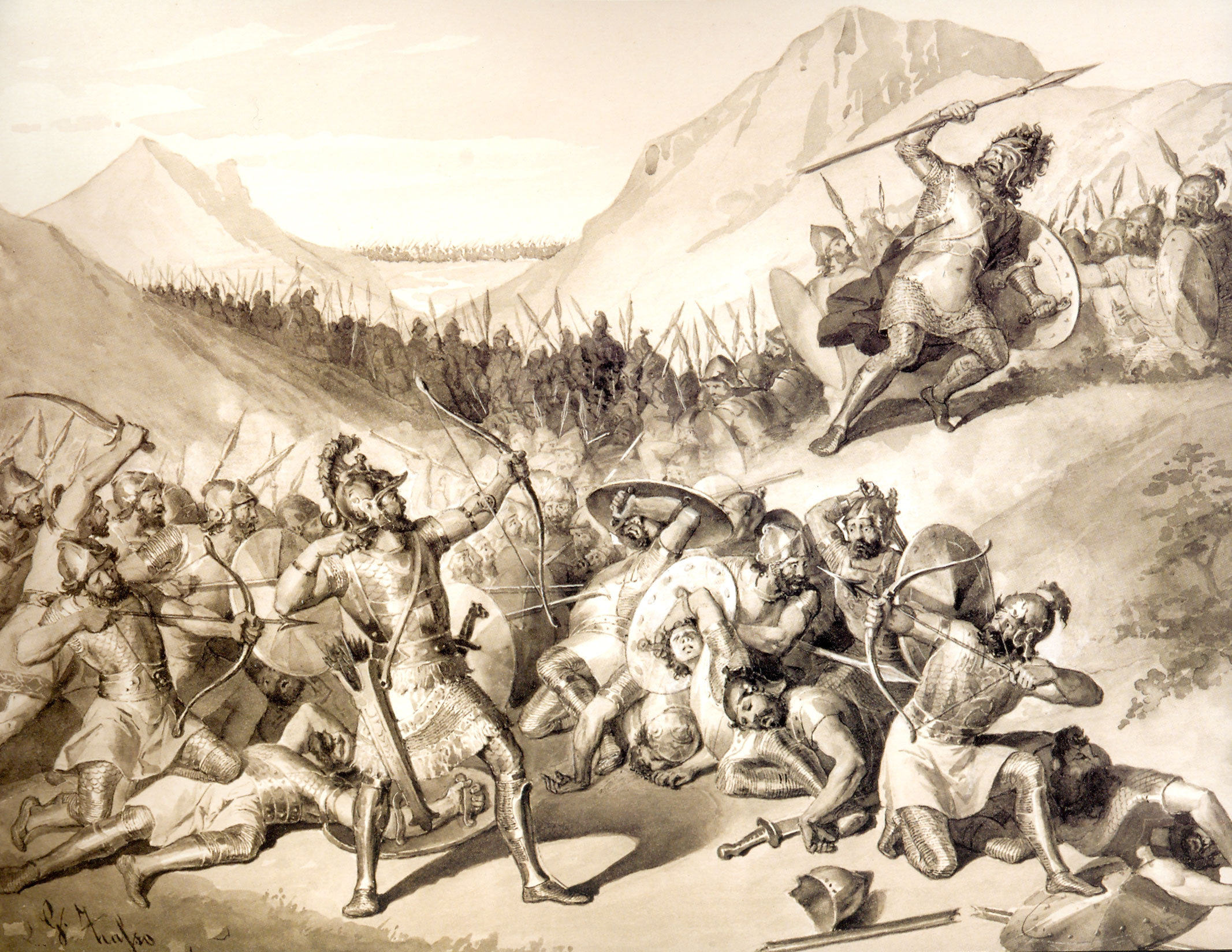
- Hayk defeats Bel with an arrow, a 19th-century depiction by Giuliano Zasso
Date	11 August 2492 BC (traditional dating)
Location	On the eastern side of Lake Van, in the valley of the Hoşap River, Vaspurakan
Result	Hayk's victory

Belligerents
Babylonia	Proto-Armenian clans

Commanders and leaders
Bel †	Hayk

Strength
Unknown	Unknown

The Battle of Hayots Dzor (Note: Also known as Battle of Khoshab (Armenian: Խոշաբի ճակատամարտ, romanized: Khoshabi ch'akatamart) or the Dyutsaznamart (Armenian: Դյուցազնամարտ, lit. 'Battle of the Giants')) is a legendary event rooted in Armenian national mythology, traditionally dated to 2492 BC. According to the 5th-century Armenian historian Movses Khorenatsi, the battle was fought between Hayk, the revered patriarch and symbolic founder of the Armenian nation, and Bel, a foreign tyrant often identified with the Babylonian ruler Bel.

Said to have taken place in the mountainous region of Vaspurakan, near the eastern shores of Lake Van, this mytho-historical confrontation represents a foundational moment in Armenian cultural memory. Hayk’s victory is not only portrayed as a triumph over oppression but also as the origin point of Armenian identity and autonomy—marking the beginning of a lineage and homeland named in his honor: Hayastan.

== Source and historicity ==
The primary account of the battle appears in Movses Khorenatsi’s monumental work, the History of Armenia, which blends oral tradition, myth, genealogical accounts, and early historical recollections. Though Movses Khorenatsi is often hailed as the “father of Armenian history,” modern scholars approach his narratives with a critical lens, noting the symbolic and literary nature of many of his accounts.

Nevertheless, the tale of Hayk and Bel has remained a cornerstone of Armenian collective identity for centuries, often interpreted as a metaphorical memory of early resistance against Mesopotamian hegemony and the assertion of a distinct cultural presence in the Armenian Highlands.

== Background ==
According to Armenian legendary tradition, Bel, a Titan-like giant, rose to power as a tyrannical leader in Babylonia, proclaiming himself both king and god. His ambition was to subjugate all peoples and lands under his dominion. Refusing to bow to Bel’s authority, Hayk, the patriarch and forefather of the Armenian nation, gathered his extended family and followers—about 300 men with their households—and departed from Babylonia, journeying northward toward the land of Ararat. This region, located within the Armenian Highlands, held symbolic and ancestral significance for the Armenian people.

Determined to bring Hayk to heel, Bel sent envoys—including one of his sons—to demand submission. Hayk defiantly rejected Bel’s ultimatum. In retaliation, Bel assembled a vast army and marched northward to punish the rebellion. In preparation, Hayk and his warriors fortified themselves in the valley of Hayots Dzor, located in the district of Eruandunik, near the eastern shore of Lake Van.

In the ensuing battle, Hayk took aim with his legendary longbow and felled Bel with a three-feathered arrow—a detail preserved in Armenian oral and literary tradition. The death of Bel caused panic among his troops, who fled the battlefield, securing a symbolic victory for Hayk and laying the mythical foundations of the Armenian nation.

== Battle ==
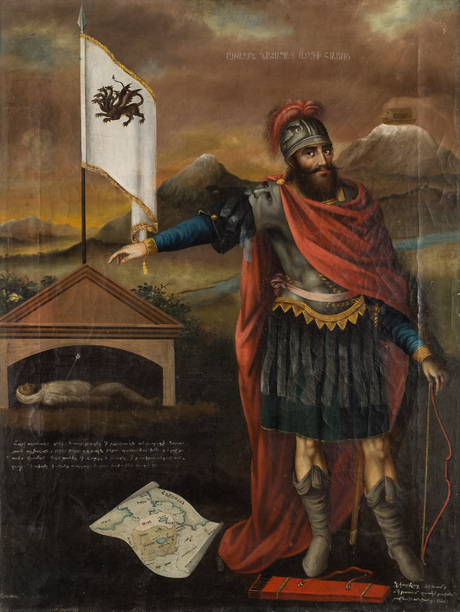
Hayk slays Bel. Painting by Mkrtum Hovnatanyan (1779–1846).

Bel appeared on the battlefield clad in elaborate armor: an iron headdress with glistening pendants, copper plates protecting his chest and back, armored limbs, and a belt around his waist. He carried a double-edged sword on his left, a massive spear in his right hand, and a large shield in his left, flanked by elite warriors on each side.

In response, Hayk positioned his forces strategically. He placed Aramaneak and two of his brothers on the right flank, and Kadmos with two other sons on the left—men renowned for their skill with both bow and sword. Hayk himself stood at the front, forming a triangular formation with his forces.

When the two armies clashed, the earth resounded with the crash of their weapons. The battle was fierce and evenly matched, with many warriors falling on both sides. At a critical moment, the Titan Bel, shaken by the stalemate, began retreating toward a nearby hill, seeking a vantage point to resume his assault. Seizing the moment, Hayk advanced swiftly. With his mighty longbow stretched wide “as broad as a lake,” he loosed a three-feathered arrow that pierced Bel's chest armor and passed through his back, pinning him to the ground. The Titan, mortally wounded, collapsed and died.

== Aftermath ==
Following his victory, Hayk founded a settlement at the site of the battle and named it Haykʻ, from which the valley derived the name Hayots Dzor (“Valley of the Armenians”). The hill where Bel and his warriors fell was named Gerezmank, later pronounced Gerezmanakk. Bel’s corpse, preserved with ointments, was taken to Hark and buried on a hill before his wives and sons.

According to legend, the Armenian nation was thereafter called "Hay" (հայ) and the land “Hayastan” or “Hayq” (Հայք), after Hayk Nahapet (the Forefather). The term "Armenia" and the name "Armen" are traditionally believed to derive from his descendant, Aram.

Many regions in the Armenian Highlands are mythologically attributed to Hayk and his descendants. For example:

- Haykashen was named after Hayk himself.
- Mount Aragats and Aragatsotn Province were named after Aramaneak.
- Armavir after Aramayis.
- Yeraskh (Araks River) after Erast.
- Shirak after Shara.
- Mount Masis (Ararat) after Amasia.
- Lake Gegham and Gegharkunik after Gegham.
- Sisakan (now Syunik Province) after Sisak.
- Ayrarat (now Ararat Province) after Ara the Handsome (Ara Geghetsik).

== Genetic and Cultural Context ==
The Battle of Hayots Dzor is central to Armenian mythology as the founding event of the Armenian nation, marking Hayk’s victory over Bel as the moment of liberation and the establishment of Armenian identity. According to Movses Khorenatsi, this event in 2492 BC not only secured the independence of Hayk’s people but also gave rise to the names "Hayastan" and "Hay" after Hayk Nahapet, the legendary forefather. A 2015 genetic study published in the American Journal of Human Genetics supports the antiquity of Armenian origins, identifying a population bottleneck around 4,500 years ago—roughly consistent with Khorenatsi’s chronology. This genetic evidence, reported by The New York Times and Armenpress, suggests a significant demographic or cultural shift in the region, possibly linked to the ethnogenesis of the Armenian people and lending indirect support to the legendary narrative of the battle.

Further archaeological and genetic research has linked this timeframe to the expansion of the Trialeti-Vanadzor culture, a Middle Bronze Age civilization centered in the Armenian Highlands and southern Caucasus. Flourishing between roughly 2400 and 1500 BC, this culture is marked by rich burial mounds (kurgans), wheeled vehicles, and sophisticated metallurgy, often interpreted as evidence of social stratification and complex cultural systems. The Trialeti-Vanadzor culture is widely regarded as one of the strongest archaeological candidates for the Proto-Armenian horizon. It shares close cultural ties with contemporaneous Indo-European groups, particularly the Yamnaya culture and Catacomb culture of the Eurasian steppe, known for similar burial customs and material culture.

Genome-wide studies have identified a substantial influx of steppe-related ancestry into the South Caucasus during the mid–3rd millennium BC, corresponding with the rise of the Trialeti-Vanadzor culture. This ancestry, associated with Yamnaya-derived lineages such as R1b-Z2103, has been detected in ancient and modern Armenian populations, suggesting long-term genetic continuity. These genetic signals, combined with archaeological continuities in ceramics, metalwork, and funerary practices, suggest that the Trialeti-Vanadzor culture played a central role in shaping the demographic and cultural landscape of the Armenian Highlands.

Many Armenian and international scholars interpret this convergence of data as evidence of a Bronze Age cultural substrate from which Armenian identity emerged. This view situates the myth of Hayk and Bel within a broader historical framework of Indo-European migrations, cultural consolidation, and the assertion of regional autonomy. As such, the legendary battle may symbolically encode real processes of ethnic formation and early statehood in the South Caucasus during the Bronze Age.

== See also ==
- Ninus
- Fall of Nineveh
- Fall of Babylon
