= Barsam =

Barsam is a surname. Notable people with the surname include:

- Allon Barsam (born 1977), English ophthalmologist
- Richard Barsam (born 1938), American film theorist

== See also ==
- Barsamian
- Barsamin
