= History of the Armenians =

History of the Armenians may refer to:

- the history of Armenia
- History of the Armenians, a book by pseudo-Agathangelos
- History of the Armenians, alternative title of History of Armenia (book) by Movses Khorenatsi
