= Myth of Er =

Socrates' explation to Glaucon that souls must be immortal

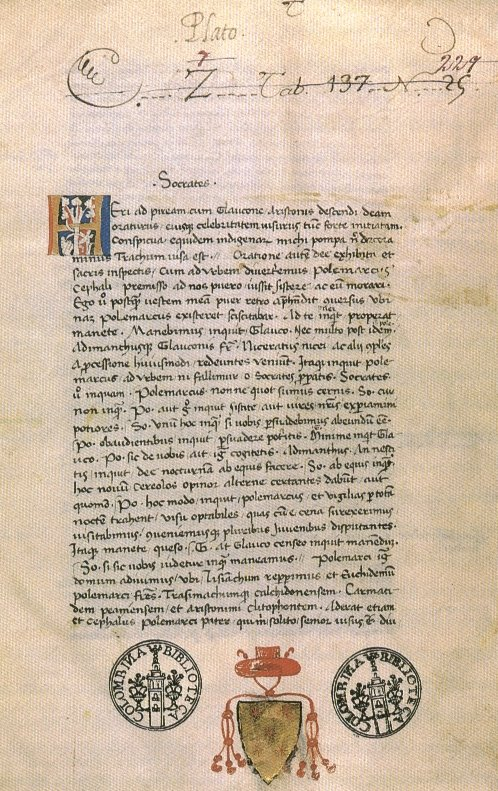
A Renaissance manuscript Latin translation of The Republic

The Myth of Er (/ɛər/; Ancient Greek: Ἤρ, romanized: ér, gen.: Ἠρός) is a legend that concludes Plato's Republic (10.614–10.621). The story is given as moral instruction for Glaucon and includes an account of the cosmos and the afterlife that greatly influenced religious, philosophical, and scientific thought for many centuries.

The story begins with a man named Er, son of Armenios (Ἀρμένιος), from Pamphylia, who dies in battle. When the bodies of those who died in the battle are collected, ten days after his death, Er remains undecomposed. Two days later he revives on his funeral-pyre and tells others of his journey in the afterlife, including an account of metempsychosis and the celestial spheres of the astral plane. The tale includes the idea that moral people are rewarded and immoral people punished after death.

Although called the Myth of Er, the word "myth" here means "word, speech, account", rather than the modern meaning. The word is used at the end when Socrates explains that because Er did not drink the waters of Lethe, the account (mythos in Greek) was preserved for us.

== Er's tale ==
With many other souls as his companions, Er had come across an awe-inspiring place with four openings – two into and out of the sky and two into and out of the ground. Judges sat between these openings and ordered the souls which path to follow: the good were guided into the path into the sky, the immoral were directed below. But when Er approached the judges, he was told to remain, listening and observing in order to report his experience to humankind.

Meanwhile from the other opening in the sky, clean souls floated down, recounting beautiful sights and wondrous feelings. Those returning from underground appeared dirty, haggard, and tired, crying in despair when recounting their awful experiences, as each was required to pay a tenfold penalty for all the wicked deeds committed when alive. There were some, however, who could not be released from underground. Murderers, tyrants and other non-political criminals were doomed to remain by the exit of the underground, unable to escape.

After seven days in the meadow, the souls and Er were required to travel farther. After four days they reached a place where they could see a shaft of rainbow light brighter than any they had seen before. After another days travel they reached it. This was the Spindle of Necessity. Several women, including Lady Necessity, her daughters, and the Sirens were present. The souls – except for Er – were then organized into rows and were each given a lottery token.

Then, in the order in which their lottery tokens were chosen, each soul was required to come forward to choose his or her next life. Er recalled the first one to choose a new life: a man who had not known the terrors of the underground but had been rewarded in the sky, hastily chose a powerful dictatorship. Upon further inspection he realized that, among other atrocities, he was destined to eat his own children. Er observed that this was often the case of those who had been through the path in the sky, whereas those who had been punished often chose a better life. Many preferred a life different from their previous experience. Animals chose human lives while humans often chose the apparently easier lives of animals. Odysseus chooses a private ordinary life after remembering the suffering caused by his love of reputation.

After this, each soul was assigned a guardian spirit to help him or her through their life. They passed under the throne of Lady Necessity, then traveled to the Plane of Oblivion, where the River of Forgetfulness (River Lethe) flowed. Each soul was required to drink some of the water, in varying quantities; again, Er only watched. As they drank, each soul forgot everything. As they lay down at night to sleep each soul was lifted up into the night in various directions for rebirth, completing their journey. Er remembered nothing of the journey back to his body. He opened his eyes to find himself lying on the funeral pyre early in the morning, able to recall his journey through the afterlife.

== The moral ==
In the dialogue Plato introduces the story by having Socrates explain to Glaucon that the soul must be immortal, and cannot be destroyed. Socrates tells Glaucon the Myth of Er to explain that the choices we make and the character we develop will have consequences after death. Earlier in Book II of the Republic, Socrates points out that even the gods can be tricked by a clever charlatan who appears just while unjust in his psyche, in that they would welcome the pious but false "man of the people" and would reject and punish the truly just but falsely accused man. In the Myth of Er the true characters of the falsely-pious and those who are immodest in some way are revealed when they are asked to choose another life and pick the lives of tyrants. Those who lived happy but middling lives in their previous life are most likely to choose the same for their future life, not necessarily because they are wise, but out of habit. Those who were treated with infinite injustice, despairing of the possibility of a good human life, choose the souls of animals for their future incarnation. The philosophic life — which identifies the types of lives that emerge from experience, character, and fate — allow men to make good choices when presented with options for a new life. Whereas success, fame, and power may provide temporary heavenly rewards or hellish punishments, philosophic virtues always work to one's advantage.

== The Spindle of Necessity ==
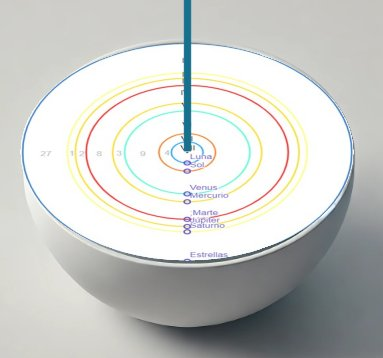
Representation of the Spindle of Necessity. The eight whorls are depicted, each labeled with the name of its corresponding planet, along with the celestial sphere.

The myth mentions "The Spindle of Necessity", in that the cosmos is represented by the Spindle attended by sirens and the three daughters of the Goddess Necessity known collectively as The Fates, whose duty is to keep the rims of the spindle revolving. The Fates, Sirens, and Spindle are used in the Republic, partly to help explain how known celestial bodies revolved around the Earth according to the cosmology in the Republic.

The "Spindle of Necessity", according to Plato, is "shaped... like the ones we know"—the standard Greek spindle, consisting of a hook, shaft, and whorl. The hook was fixed near the top of the shaft on its long side. On the other end resided the whorl. The hook was used to spin the shaft, which in turn spun the whorl on the other end.

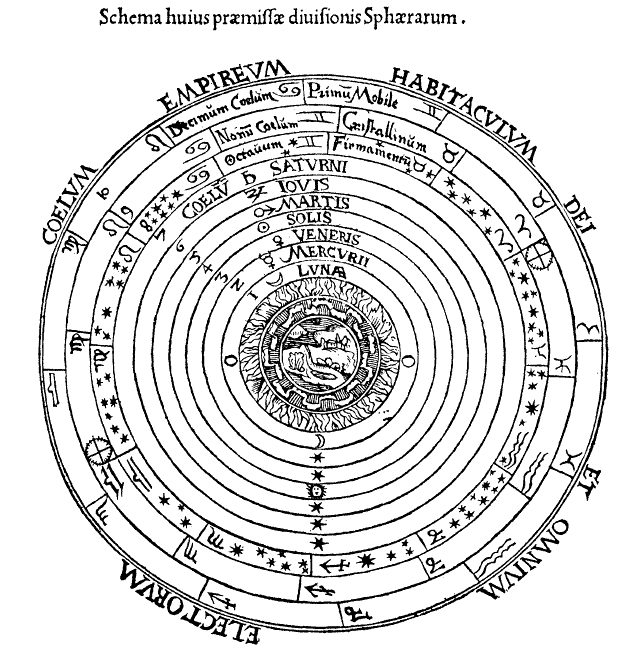
The classical heavens

Placed on the whorl of his celestial spindle were 8 "orbits", whereof each created a perfect circle. Each "orbit" is given different descriptions by Plato.

Based on Plato's descriptions within the passage, the orbits can be identified as those of the classical planets, corresponding to the Aristotelian planetary spheres:

- Orbit 1 – Stars
- Orbit 2 – Saturn
- Orbit 3 – Jupiter
- Orbit 4 – Mars
- Orbit 5 – Sun
- Orbit 6 – Venus
- Orbit 7 – Mercury
- Orbit 8 – Moon

The descriptions of the rims accurately fit the relative distance and revolution speed of the respective bodies as would appear to an observer from Earth (aside from the Moon, which revolves around the Earth slightly more slowly than the sun).

== Comparative mythology ==
One scholar has connected the Myth of Er to the Armenian legend of Ara the Handsome (Armenian: Արա Գեղեցիկ Ara Gełec‘ik). In the Armenian story, the king Ara was so handsome that the Assyrian queen Semiramis waged war against Armenia to capture him and bring him back to her, alive, so she could marry him. During the battle, Semiramis was victorious, but Ara was slain despite her orders to capture him alive. To avoid continuous warfare with the Armenians, Semiramis, reputed to be a sorceress, took Ara's body and prayed to the gods to raise him from the dead. When the Armenians advanced to avenge their leader, Semiramis disguised one of her lovers as Ara and spread the rumor that the gods had brought Ara back to life, convincing the Armenians not to continue the war. In one tradition, Semiramis' prayers are successful and Ara returns to life.

Armen Petrosyan suggests that Plato's version reflects an earlier form of the story where Er (Ara) rises from the grave.

== See also ==
- Allegorical interpretations of Plato
- Axis mundi
- Dante's Inferno
- Daniil Andreev
- Dream of Scipio
- Near-death experience
- The Gospel of Afranius
- Zalmoxis
