= Barsamian =

Barsamian (Barsamyan) or Parsamian (Parsamyan) (Armenian: Պարսամյան (Բարսամյան)) is an Armenian surname.

The surname originates from the Armenian male name Parsam, which is derived either from the Greek name Partan - "worm repository" or (according to Hrachya Acharyan) from the Assyrian name Barsauma - "fasting".

== Notable people with the surname ==
- Antony Barsamian, Armenian Assembly of America Board of Directors Chairman
- David Barsamian, American radio broadcaster and writer
- Jacques Barsamian (1943–2024), French singer, writer, and journalist
- Khajag Barsamian, Diocese of Armenian Church of America Primate and the Fund for Armenian Relief president

== See also ==
- Barsam
- Barsamin
