= Hayk =

Legendary founder of the Armenian nation

Hayk Nahapet Հայկ Նահապետ
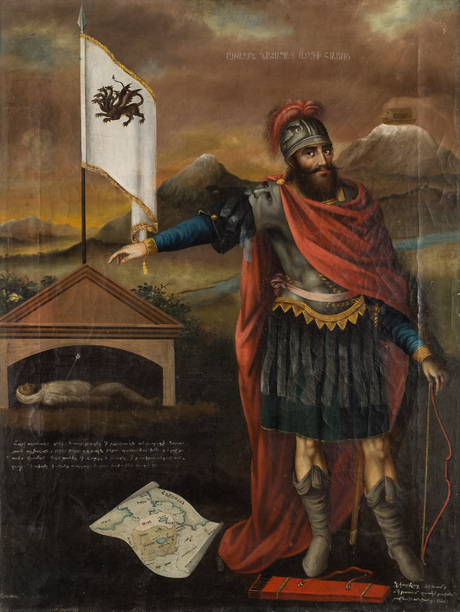
- Hayk by Mkrtum Hovnatanian (1779–1846). Hayk is depicted standing next to the tomb of Bel, with his arrow still in Bel's chest. In the background is Mount Ararat, with Noah's Ark on its peak. The map at his feet depicts Armenia.
- Children: Aramaneak; Khor; Manavaz
- Parent: Togarmah (father)

Hayk (Note: Also spelled Haik or Haig.) (Armenian: Հայկ, Armenian pronunciation: [hajk]), also known as Hayk Nahapet (Հայկ Նահապետ, Armenian pronunciation: [hajk nahaˈpɛt], lit. 'Hayk the Patriarch'), is the legendary patriarch and founder of the Armenian nation. He is a central figure in Armenian mythology and national identity, and is traditionally regarded as the eponymous ancestor from whom the Armenian people, the "Hay", derive their name. His tale is recounted in the History of Armenia attributed to the 5th-century historian Movses Khorenatsi, as well as in the anonymous Primary History. Additional fragments of his legend survive in other medieval sources and continue to be echoed in Armenian oral tradition and epic poetry.

According to legend, Hayk was a mighty archer and chieftain who defied the tyranny of the Babylonian ruler Bel. After leading his people out of captivity, he established their freedom by slaying Bel in the legendary Battle of Hayots Dzor, near Lake Van in the Armenian Highlands. This foundational battle, in which Hayk is said to have struck Bel with a powerful arrow, symbolized both the spiritual triumph of justice over despotism and the birth of the Armenian nation.

== Etymology ==
The name of the patriarch, Hayk (Հայկ), is not exactly homophonous with the Armenian name for "Armenia," Haykʻ (Հայք). In Classical Armenian, Haykʻ is the nominative plural of hay (հայ), the Armenian word for "Armenian." While Robert W. Thomson considers the etymology of Haykʻ (Հայք) from Hayk (Հայկ) to be impossible, other scholars consider the connection between the two to be obvious and derive Hayk from hay/Haykʻ via the suffix -ik. Armen Petrosyan proposes a possible connection between the name Hayk and the Proto-Indo-European *poti- "master, lord, master of the house, husband." Armenian historiography of the Soviet era connected Hayk and hay with Hayasa, a people mentioned in Hittite inscriptions. Some authors derive Hayk and hay from Khaldi/Ḫaldi, the chief god of the Urartian pantheon, and also identify Hayk with the Urartian deity.

The Armenian word haykakan (հայկական, 'pertaining to Armenians') derives from the name Hayk. Additionally, the poetic names for the Armenian nation, Haykazun (հայկազուն) or Haykazn (հայկազն, consisting of Hayk and azn 'generation, nation, tribe'), also derive from Hayk (Haykazn/Haykaz later became a masculine given name among Armenians).

== Genealogy ==
Noah
Japheth
Gomer
Togarmah
Hayk

Integrating the Armenian tradition into biblical tradition, the old Armenian historian Movses Khorenatsi describes Hayk as a descendant of Noah through the latter's son Japheth: "Yapheth begat Gamer [Gomer]; Gamer begat T‘iras; T‘iras begat T‘orgom [Togarmah]; T‘orgom begat Hayk." Hayk's descendants through his son Aramaneak (Aramanyak) are listed as follows: "Aramaneak begat Aramayis; Aramayis begat Amasya; Amasya begat Gełam [Gegham]; Gełam begat Harmay [Harma]; Harmay begat Aram; Aram begat Ara the Handsome." Hayk's other sons, according to Khorenatsi, were Khoṛ and Manavaz. Khorenatsi also gives the names of numerous other descendants of Hayk (Haykazunis, "of Hayk's lineage," also known as the Haykids), such as Sisak, Skayordi, Paruyr, and Vahe, some of whom he identifies as kings of Armenia.

In reference to Hayk's descent from Torgom/Togarmah, medieval Armenian sources sometimes referred to Armenia as T‘orgoma tun ("House of Torgom") and to Armenians as T‘orgomyan azg ("the people of Torgom"). Khorenatsi was not the first to identify Togarmah as the ancestor of the Armenians. The earlier Armenian history attributed to Agathangelos contains this tradition, which derives from the Greek Chronicle attributed to Hippolytus, compiled before AD 235. Less frequently, medieval Armenian authors traced the Armenian nation's ancestry to Ashkenaz, Togarmah's elder brother. The connection between Hayk and the descendants of Noah was created by Christian authors following the Christianization of Armenia in order to connect Armenians to the biblical narrative of human history.

In the Georgian History of the Kings of Kartli (part of the compendium called The Georgian Chronicles) written or edited by Leonti Mroveli, Hayk (whose name is rendered Haos) is named as one of eight brothers who were sons of Togarmah; these eight brothers are said to have "served the giant Nebrot' [Nimrod], who was the first king of the whole world" and are identified as the ancestors of the "Armenians and Georgians, Ranians and Movkanians, Hers and Leks, Megrelians and Caucasians". In the corresponding section of the Armenian version of The Georgian Chronicles, which includes an abridged translation of History of the Kings of Kartli, Hayk is called "lord of the seven brothers". Earlier Armenian sources do not mention any brothers of Hayk.

== Legend ==
According to the accounts of Movses Khorenatsi and the anonymous Primary History, Hayk fought against and killed the tyrannical Babylonian king—described as a titan—Bel. Depending on the mythological tradition, Belus can refer to a symbolic Babylonian/Akkadian god of war or mythical founder of Babylon. Moses identifies Bel with the biblical Nimrod and gives a list of his ancestors and successors, drawing from the Bible and Abydenus via Eusebius's works.

In Movses Khorenatsi's account (which he claims to have learned from Mar Abas Catina's writings), Hayk, son of Torgom, had a child named Aramaneak while he was living in Babylon. After the arrogant Bel made himself king over all, Hayk emigrated to the region near Ararad (Note: By Ararad, Khorenatsi meant the location where Noah's Ark landed. It is not to be confused in this instance with the Armenian province of Ayrarat or with today's Mount Ararat, which was not yet identified with the Biblical Ararat in Khorenatsi's time. In Book I, chapter 11, Khorenatsi places Ararad in the south of Armenia.) with his extended family, servants, followers and about 300 warriors and founded a village called Haykashen. On the way he had left a detachment in another settlement with his grandson Kadmos. Bel sent one of his sons to entreat him to return, but Hayk refused. Bel decided to march against him with a massive force, but Hayk was warned ahead of time by Kadmos of his pending approach. He assembled his own army along the shore of Lake Van and told them that they must defeat and kill Bel, or die trying to do so, rather than become his slaves.

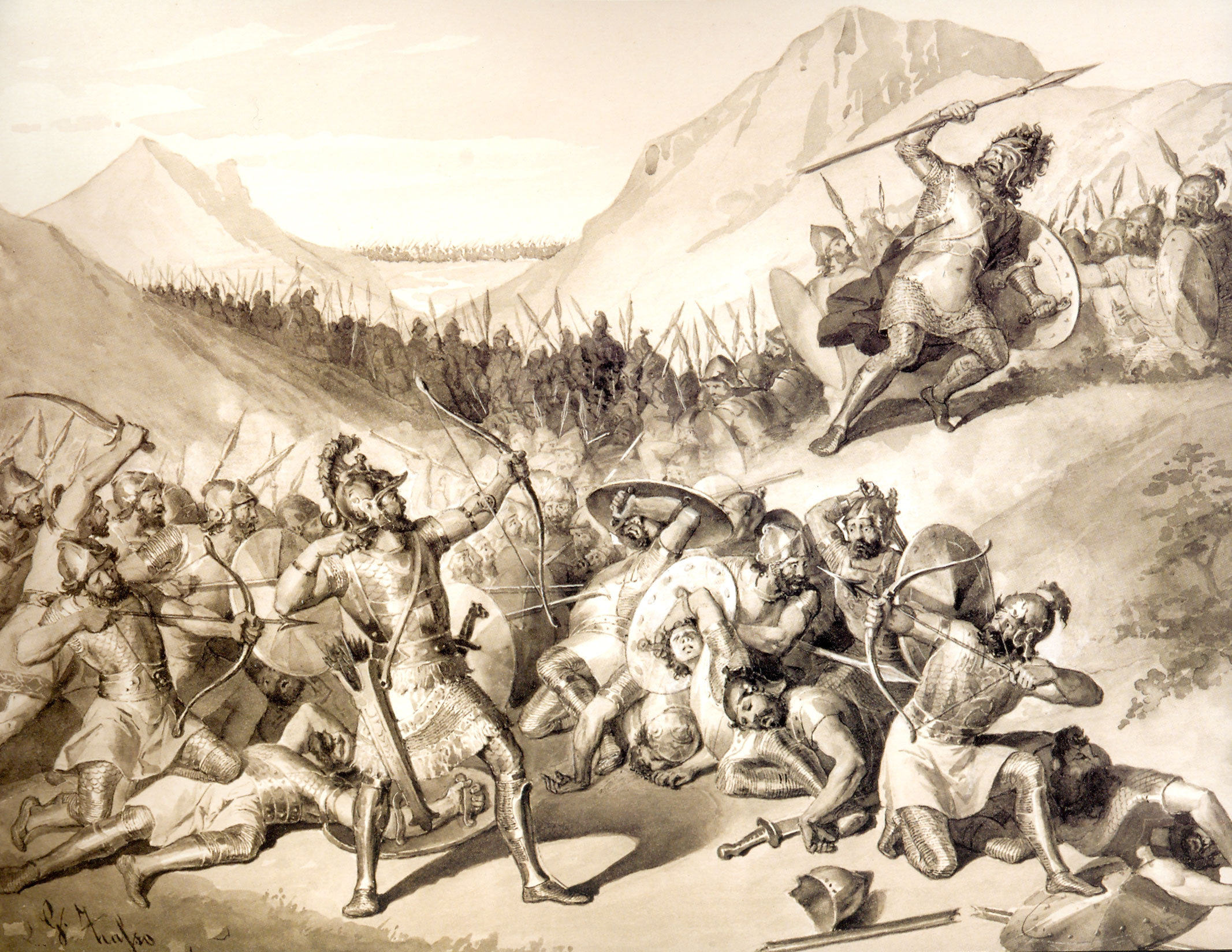
Hayk defeats Bel with an arrow

Moses writes that the armies of Hayk and Bel clashed near Lake Van "in a plain between very high mountains." King Bel was initially in the vanguard, but seeing that the outcome of the battle was uncertain, he withdrew to a hill to await the arrival of the rest of his army. Seeing this, Hayk slew Bel with a nearly impossible shot using his long bow, sending the king's forces into disarray. Hayk named the hill where Bel fell with his warriors Gerezmankʻ, meaning "tombs". He embalmed the corpse of Bel and ordered it to be taken to Hark‘ where it was to be buried in a high place in the view of the wives and sons of the king. Soon after, Hayk established the fortress or settlement (dastakert) of Haykʻ or Haykaberd at the site of the battle, which, Movses Khorenatsi says, is why the district is called Hayotsʻ Dzor ("The Valley of the Armenians", to the southeast of Lake Van) and the country of the Armenians is called Hayk‘.

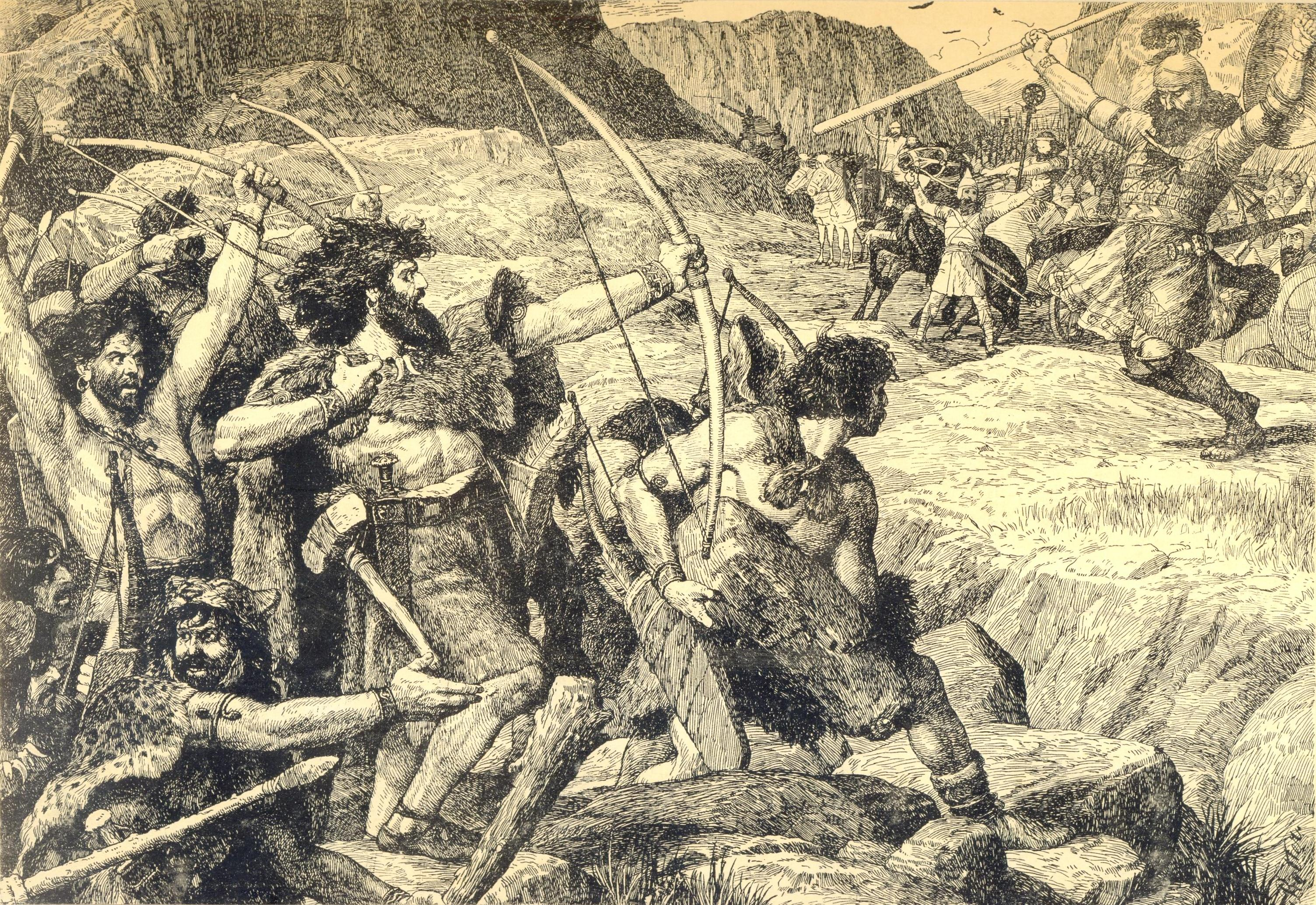
Battle of Hayk and Bell by Josef Rotter

The 18th- and 19th-century scholars Ghevont Alishan and Mikayel Chamchian, using different methods, calculated the date of the mythical battle (also known as the Dyutsaznamart, Armenian: Դյուցազնամարտ, "Battle of the Giants") between Hayk and Bel to have been August 11, 2492 BCE or 2107 BCE, respectively.

== Interpretations and comparative mythology ==
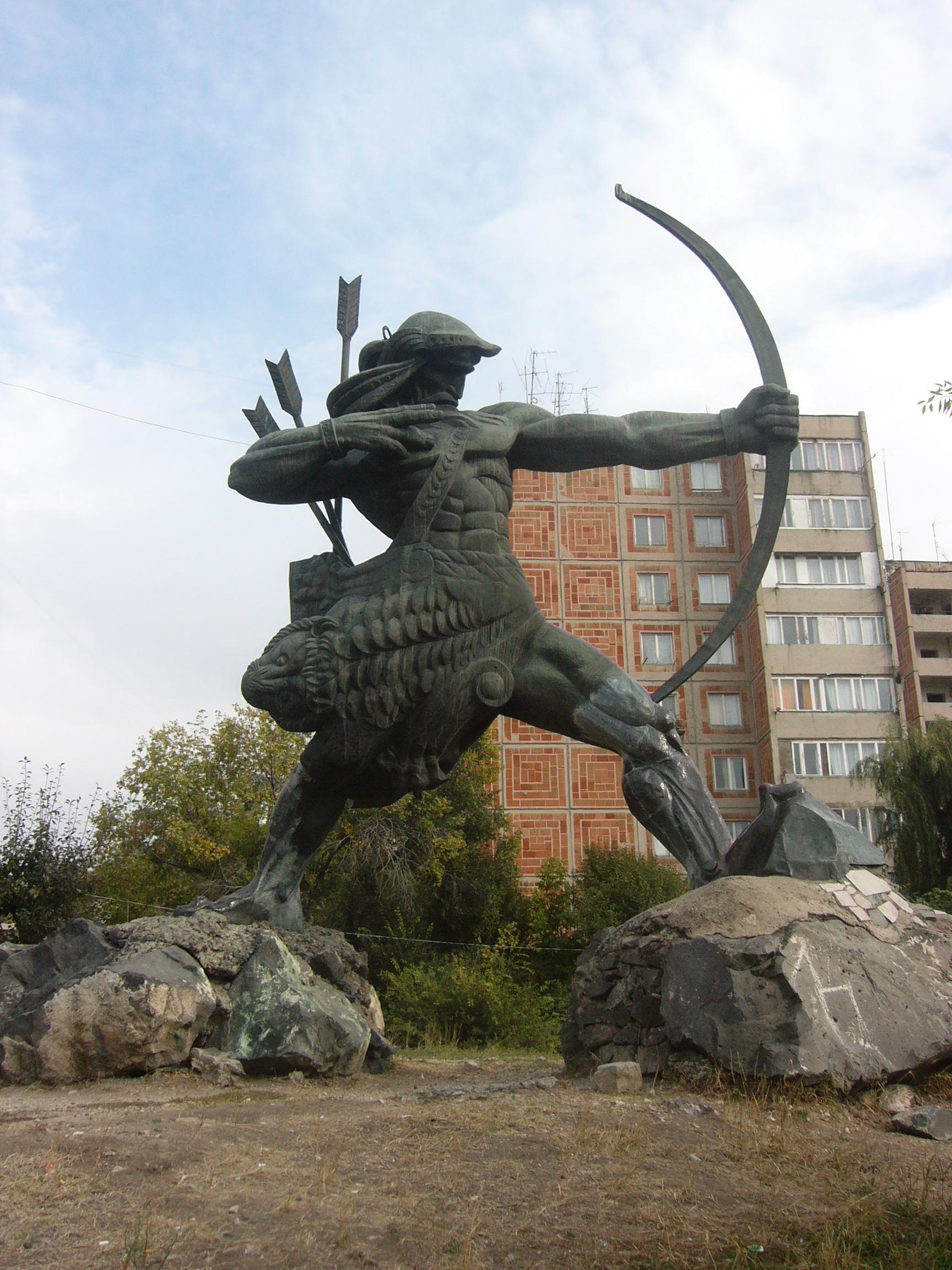
Statue of Hayk (1970) by Karlen Nurijanyan in Yerevan, Armenia

Hayk is thought to have been one of the oldest gods of the Armenian people. Armen Petrosyan describes Hayk as "a complex epic figure that combines the characteristics of the god creator, the father and patriarch of gods, the thunder god, and the war god" that derives from Indo-European archetypes and was influenced by Near Eastern mythology. In Petrosyan's view, the Armenian myth of Hayk represents an "epicized version" of an Armenian creation myth, and Hayk and his descendants are "the epicized figures of the oldest Armenian gods"—hence why the names of months, hours, countries, mountains and rivers were derived from Hayk and his first descendants. Following S. Ahyan and Georges Dumézil, Petrosyan asserts that Hayk and his descendants Aram and Ara represent a manifestation of the "trifunctional" triad of Indo-European mythology: sovereign, military, and fertility, respectively. Hayk is shown as the head of a large patriarchal family including three hundred men and their respective families. Petrosyan connects this with Hayk's name, which he derives from Proto-Indo-European *poti- 'master, lord, master of the house, husband'. Furthermore, Petrosyan writes that Hayk and his warriors represents an echo of the earliest Proto-Indo-European Männerbund or warriors' band.

According to Gevorg Tiratsyan, Hayk was originally a hunter god who acquired cosmogonic features, as shown by his association with the stars (Hayk was the old Armenian name for the constellation Orion and appears as such in the Armenian translation of the Bible). Later, in the early stages of the development of class society, Hayk became associated with the Armenians' struggle against foreign invaders; at this stage, Hayk and Bel appear as the gods of separate countries (Armenians and their southern, Semitic-speaking neighbors, respectively). Hayk came to be worshipped both as a god and as an ancestor who won freedom for the Armenians. Scholars have variously connected the legend of Hayk and his descendants with hypotheses on the origin and historical movements of the Armenian people. For example, Tiratsyan writes that the story of Hayk and Bel echoes the longstanding conflict between Urartu and Assyria and the settlement of the Armenian highlands by the Armenians. On the other hand, Maxim Katvalyan writes that the Hayk legend reflects the local origins of the Armenians rather than their migration from outside (the story of Hayk's settlement in Armenia, in his view, is a later accretion connecting the story with the Biblical story of the Tower of Babel).

Hayk's flight from Babylon and his eventual defeat of Bel has been compared to Zeus's escape to the Caucasus and eventual defeat of the Titans. Petrosyan considers the Indian deity Rudra to be the most similar mythological figure to Hayk. Both are associated with the constellation Orion, both have descendants or followers of the same name (Hays and Rudras) and both are archers that kill their enemy with an arrow.

== See also ==
- Hayko
- Aram (given name)
- Belus (Assyrian)
- Nimrod
- Armenian mythology
- Hayasa-Azzi
- Armens
- Sisak (eponym)
- Mahabali

== Bibliography ==
- Ahyan, Stepan (1982). "Les débuts de l'histoire d'Arménie et les trois fonctions indo-européennes". Revue de l'histoire des religions. 199 (3): 251–271. doi:10.3406/rhr.1982.4670.
- Petrosyan, Armen (2007). "The Indo-European *H2ner(t)-s and the Danu Tribe". Journal of Indo-European Studies. 35: 297–310. ISSN 0092-2323.
