= Aram (Nahapet) =

- Nahapet
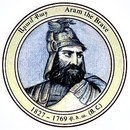
- Predecessor: Harma
- Successor: Ara the Handsome
- Issue: Ara the Handsome
- Dynasty: Haykazuni
- Father: Harma

Aram (Armenian: Արամ) was a legendary Armenian patriarch (nahapet). According to Armenian tradition, mainly preserved in the history of Movses Khorenatsi, he was the son of Harma and a descendant of the first Armenian patriarch Hayk. Per the legend, Armenians were united into one state and expanded their territory in all directions during his reign. He was succeeded by his son Ara the Handsome.

== Name ==
According to philologist Armen Petrosyan, the name Aram is likely an Armenian word that directly developed from Proto-Indo-European *rēmo-, meaning "black". Petrosyan argues that both Armenian Aram and Indic Rama derive from a "common" Indo-European myth about a hero whose name means black (PIE *h₂reh₁mo-) defeating a foe named "bright, white, silver" (PIE *h₂erg-). Iranologist Anahit Perikhanian derives Aram, as well as the names of the other legendary Armenian patriarchs Aramaneak and Aramayis, from Middle Median *Arām, from Old Iranian *Rāma- (meaning "joy, peace"). Linguist Hrachia Acharian connected the name with Arame, the name of an Urartian king, and wrote that the figure of Aram was a reflection of the memory of the historical king Arame. In Petrosyan's view, the name Arame derives from the same Indo-European source as Aram. Petrosyan also derives from this root the name of the Argonaut Armenos, who is considered the ancestor of the Armenians in Greek and Latin sources.

According to the early Armenian historian Movses Khorenatsi, the name Armenia and similar names used by foreigners to refer to Armenia derive from Aram's name. Armenians never called themselves Armen in historical times, always using the endonym hay, although Khorenatsi sometimes uses the terms ark’ Aramean and Aramean azn 'men of Aram's stock' to refer to Armenians.

The name Aram was rare among Armenians until its revival in the 19th century. It is now a common Armenian masculine name.

== Mythological function ==
The figures of Hayk and Aram, in some aspects, are almost identical. According to Manuk Abeghyan, Aram is the second incarnation of Hayk․ Moreover, they are both considered to be the epicized versions of the archaic thunder god․ On the other hand, there are differences between the figures of Hayk and Aram and between their followers. In an Indo-European context, Hayk represents the first function (sovereignty), while Aram, the only warlike figure of the ethnogonic myth, is an obvious warrior (second function). Hayk is described as an old patriarch, the leader of adult warriors, his sons and sons' sons, "martial men about three hundred in number." Hayk fights with his adversary within the territory of Armenia, while Aram militates against the enemies in the borderlands and beyond the borders of Armenia. Hayk and Aram could be regarded as counterparts of the Indian Rudra and Indra.

== Legend ==
The legend about Aram is recorded in Khorenatsi's history. Khorenatsi writes that the legend was put into writing by Mar Abas Katina, a Syrian author. Aram was the son of Harma and a descendant of the Armenian patriarch Hayk. The 18th-century historian Mikayel Chamchian, using information from Khorenatsi's history, placed Aram's reign in 1827–1769 BC. He inherited the throne of his father, and became famous over the whole world, for the prudent and manly bravery which he displayed in the service of his country. He extended his dominion from the mountains of Caucasus to Mount Taurus, and drove all his enemies out of the country, who were very desirous to invade the territories of Armenia, and to oppress the people. Movses Khorenatsi remarks that "Aram chose rather to suffer death in defence of his country, than see it in subjection to foreigners."

In his account of the deeds of Aram, Khorenatsi narrates stories about his activities conducted against the Mede Nukar Mades, Barsham of Assyria and Payapis Kaałeay.

=== The Armenian-Median war ===
Shortly before Ninos became the ruler of Assyria, Aram, pressed by the surrounding peoples, gathers many brave fellow tribesmen archers and most skillful spearmen, young men and mature, dexterous in fights, bold in heart and ready for battle numbering about fifty thousand. At the borders of Armenia, he meets the young Medes, under the leadership of a certain Nukar, nicknamed Mades, a proud and warlike man, as the same chronicler notes, Similar to an outlaw, like the Kushans, trampling Armenia's borders with the hooves of horses, he oppressed the country for two years. But here Aram, suddenly appearing, even before sunrise, destroys all his hordes and, grabbing Nukar himself, leads him to Armavir and there orders him to be nailed to the wall at the top of the tower with an iron wedge in his forehead, to the display of passers-by and all who arrived there.

=== The Armenian-Assyrian war ===
After several generations the second eponymous patriarch of the Armenians, Aram, defeated Barsam, the epicized figure of the god Barsamin. Barsam, a Babylonian prince, three years after invaded Armenia with a large body of troops, at the head of 40,000 infantry and 5,000 cavalry. But he was met by Aram, defeated and slain. Aram immediately after marched toward Cappadocia, defeated the prince of that country and made him prisoner, and appointed Mshak, one of his followers, to the government of Cappadocia, ordering him to force the inhabitants to use only the Armenian language.

Moving to the west against First [Armenia] with forty thousand infantry and two thousand cavalry, he reached Cappadocia and a place now called Caesarea ... So as he was spending a long time in the west, there opposed him in battle the Titan Payapis Kaałeay who had seized the land between the two great seas - the Pontus and the ocean. Attacking him, [Aram] put him to flight and expelled him to an island of the Asian sea. He left over the country a certain Mshak of his own family with a thousand of his troops and returned to Armenia.

— Movses Khorenatsi, History of Armenia

This name is similar to the ethnonym of the Mushki and its occurrence along with the name of Aram in Cappadocia fits well the proposed Mushki migration into eastern Asia Minor and the historical situation here during the late Sargon II and Sennacherib.

In the 13th year of Aram's reign, a new Assyrian king ascended the throne in Assur. Armenian chroniclers, including Khorenatsi, identified this king as Ninus; however, the Assyrian king list names him as Shamshi-Adad I, a contemporary of Aram. Ninus was disturbed by the memory of his ancestor Bel's killing for many years. He was plotting revenge to destroy the descendants of brave Hayk and was waiting for the right time. But after seeing the courage and numerous victories of Aram, he had to give Aram the rank of “the second after me (Ninos)”. After that, Aram, being on strict terms of friendship with Ninus, who not only permitted his reign, but assisted him in the consolidation of his kingdom and the overthrow of his enemies, the chief of whom was Percham of the race of giants, whom they conquered on the plains of Gortouk in Assyria, and the tyrant was killed upon the field of battle.

Aram was succeeded by his son Ara the Handsome.

== See also ==
- Ara the Handsome
- Urartu
- Armenian mythology
