= Grogh =

Spirit in Armenian myth

Grogh (Armenian: գրող) is the old Armenian spirit of the underworld, writing down the names of those who died. He also takes the role of the scribe of the gods and dealer of fate for mortals, which is one of the reasons for his name. He was both feared and thanked by the people and had many possible connections with deities from other pantheons, like Mercury, Nabu, and Hutuini.

== Name etymology ==
The name Grogh comes from the native Armenian word Gir (գիր), meaning letter, written or writing, and the noun-forming suffix -ox (-ող), which wasn't a common suffix in early Armenian as there aren't many records of it. The meaning of the word may have had some connection to the mythological Grogh's role in Armenian mythology.

== Representation in mythology ==
=== Role in the myths ===
Grogh has had many roles in Armenian myths. He was considered the right-hand man of Aramazd, the head god of the old Armenian pantheon, supervising the good and bad deeds of humans. Sometimes, as the Armenian version of Gabriel, he plays an important role in the epic David of Sassoun or the Daredevils of Sassoun. He takes Mher, the elder's soul, and punishes the younger Mher by making him heirless. This identification with Gabriel, the writer of the Book of Destiny, led people to reveal Grogh as someone who brought both hope and fear.

While Grogh is most connected to Tir or the angel Gabriel, he is also a distinctly separate entity with his own role.

=== Connection to other pantheons ===
There are records of Grogh being connected to a variety of different deities from different pantheons aside from Tir and Gabriel.

From the Roman Pantheon, he's connected to Mercury (Greek Hermes), the messenger and the divine psychopomp. This could reflect his work as the first to see the souls of the dead and his connection to the underworld.

In the Babylonian pantheon, Grogh was connected to Nabu. Initially, he was only the scribe of the gods, serving as the head deity of the pantheon, Marduk. His role was during one of the yearly festivals, where, according to myth, he had saved Marduk, dealt with the destiny of the man in the world, and inscribed it on a tablet. His role and connection with writing he got over time, possibly because of his role as the scribe. This is similar to how Grogh was an independent deity but later got connected to Tir, the God of writing in the Armenian pantheon.

Another similar god that might have been the source of Grogh's worship was Hutuini, the Urartian god. His name can possibly be derived from the root "hute", meaning "to write".

All these deities have characteristics similar to Grogh's, either in his connection to writing, fate, or the underworld.

== Expressions in Armenian that invoke Grogh's name ==
Grogh's name has been used in Armenian expressions in quite a number of ways.

- Գրո՛ղը այսինչին` այսինչ բանը տանի (Let the writer take /this person/). Usually used with the pronoun 'you'. This is a reprimanding or exhorting phrase. Sometimes, it can also express discontent or a curse.
- Գրո՛ղը տանի (Let the writer take it). Can be used as a curse, an expression of inner dissatisfaction, a questioning expression, or an expression used after an explanation or clarification to add more emotion.

=== Grogh in modern media ===
The character Grogh appears in contemporary media. For example, in the comic "The Archtraveler", published in 2023 by Derunc Lena.
