= Aravan =

Aravan may refer to:

- Aravan, Kyrgyzstan, a large village in Osh Region, Kyrgyzstan
- Aravan District, a district of Osh Region, Kyrgyzstan
- Aravan or Aravansay, a river in Kyrgyzstan and Uzbekistan
- Aravan (legendary), a legendary ruler of 5th century BC Armenia
- Aravan or Iravan, a character from the ancient Indian epic Mahabharata
  - Aravan Festival in Coimbatore
