= History of Armenia (book) =

Book by Movses Khorenatsi

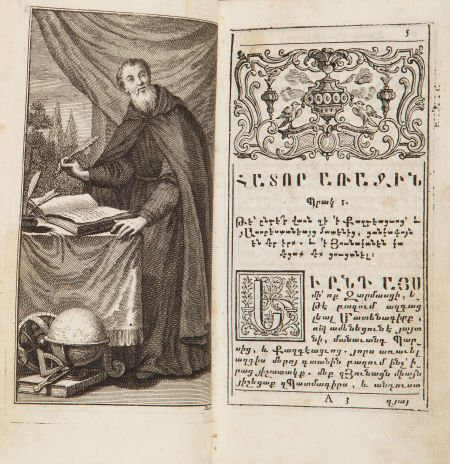
Page from a 1752 edition

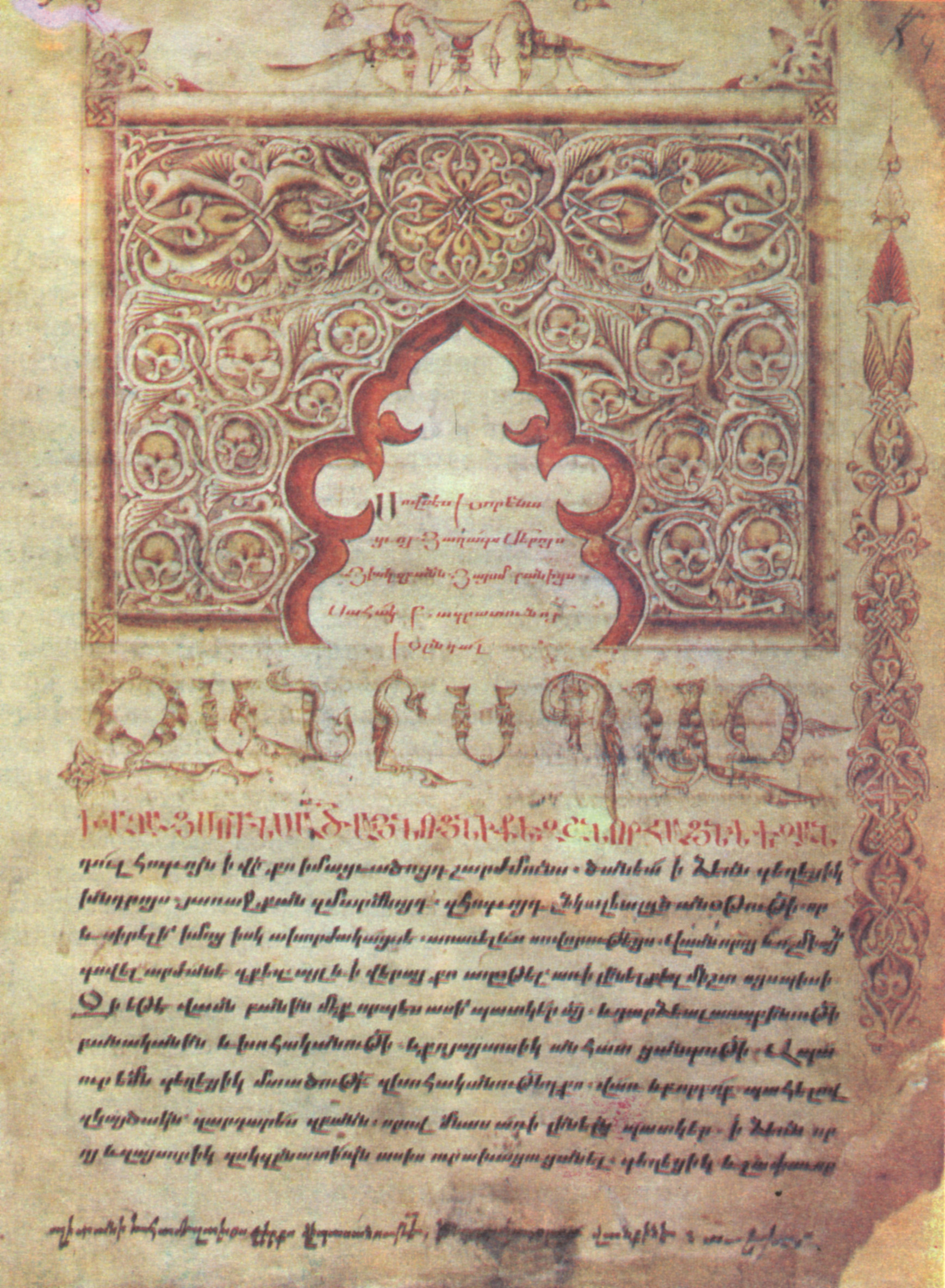
History of Armenia, 14th-century manuscript

The History of Armenia (Old Armenian: Պատմութիւն Հայոց, romanized: Patmut’iwn Hayoc’), attributed to Movses Khorenatsi, is an early account of Armenia, covering the legendary origins of the Armenian people as well as Armenia's interaction with Sassanid, Byzantine and Arsacid empires down to the 5th century.

It contains unique material on ancient Armenian legends, and such information on pagan (pre-Christian) Armenian as has survived. It also contains plentiful data on the history and culture of contiguous countries. The book had an enormous impact on Armenian historiography. In the text, the author self-identifies as a disciple of Saint Mesrop, and states that he composed his work at the request of Isaac (Sahak), the Bagratuni prince who fell in battle in 482.

== Date ==
The traditional 5th-century dating of this work of Armenian literature has elicited much discussion and a recent, plausible proposal places the final version after 775. Khorenatsi's History, then, predates the end of the 8th century. Armenian historians date ten fragments earlier than the manuscripts with the full text but do not provide any of their readings. A fragment kept in Venice is dated to 9th century or earlier, a fragment kept in Vienna is dated to 9th-10th century, fragments kept in the Matenadaran are dated to 10th-11th century and one fragment on paper is dated to 14th century. Approximately twenty manuscripts of Khorenatsi's History of the Armenians have reached us. The majority of these date from the 13th and 14th centuries. The scribe of one manuscript mentions that his was copied from the manuscript of Nerses Lambronatsi. It is assumed that this copy is the oldest, as it dates from the 12th century.

== Authorship ==
The exact time period during which Movses lived and wrote has been the subject of some debate among scholars since the nineteenth century, with some scholars dating him to the seventh to ninth centuries rather than the fifth.

== Contents ==
The book is divided into three parts:

- "Genealogy of Armenia Major", encompassing the history of Armenia from the beginning down to Alexander the Great;
- "History of the middle period of our ancestors", extending from Alexander to the death of Gregory the Illuminator and the reign of King Terdat (330);
- the third part brings the history down to the overthrow of the Arshakuni dynasty (428); and
- the fourth part brings the history down to the time of the Emperor Zeno (474–491), during this time there were three wars: a. the Armenian Independence War headed by Vasak Syuni (450), b. the civilian war between Vardan Mamikonyan and Vasak Syuni (autumn of 450 – May 451), inspired by Romans, Persians and Armenian clergy, c. the 2nd independence war headed by Sahak Bagratuni (who ordered Movses Khorenatsi to write the "history of Armenia") and then by Vahan Mamikonyan (after the death of Sahak Bagratuni in 482).

=== Patriarchs ===
This first book contains 32 chapters, from Adam to Alexander the Great. List of the Armenian patriarchs according to Moses:

- Hayk (Haig) (grandson of Tiras), Armenak (or Aram), Aramais, Amassia, Gegham, Harma, Aram
- Ara Geghetsik, Ara Kardos, Anushawan, Paret, Arbag, Zaven, Varnas, Sour, Havanag
- Vashtak, Haikak, Ampak, Arnak, Shavarsh, Norir, Vestam, Kar, Gorak, Hrant, Endzak, Geghak
- Horo, Zarmair, Perch, Arboun, Hoy, Houssak, Kipak, Skaiordi

These cover the 24th to 9th centuries BC in Moses' chronology, indebted to the Chronicon of Eusebius. There follows a list of legendary kings, covering the 8th to 4th centuries BC:

- Parouyr, Hratchia, Pharnouas, Pachouych, Kornak, Phavos, Haikak II, Erouand I, Tigran I, Vahagn, Aravan, Nerseh, Zareh, Armog, Bagam, Van, Vahé.

These gradually enter historicity with Tigran I (6th century BC), who is also mentioned in the Cyropaedia of Xenophon (Tigranes Orontid, traditionally 560–535 BC; Vahagn 530–515 BC), but Aravan to Vahé are again otherwise unknown.

chapter 1: letter to Sahak
chapter 5: from Noah to Abraham and Belus
chapters 10–12: about Hayk
chapter 13: war against the Medes
chapter 14: war against Assyria, 714 BC
chapters 15–16: Ara and Semiramis
chapters 17–19: Semiramis flees from Zoroaster to Armenia and is killed by her son.
chapter 20: Ara Kardos and Anushavan
chapter 21: Paruyr, first king of Armenia at the time of Ashurbanipal
chapter 22: kings from Pharnouas to Tigran
chapter 23: Sennacherib and his sons
chapters 24–30: about Tigran I
chapter 31: descendants of Tigran down to Vahé, who is killed in resistance against Alexander
chapter 32: Hellenic wars

=== Middle period (332 BC – AD 330) ===
92 chapters, from Alexander the Great to Tiridates III of Armenia.

=== Arsacid period (330–428) ===
68 chapters, from the death of Tiridates III to Gregory the Illuminator.

== Editions and translations ==
Number	Year	Place	Publisher	Comment
1	1695	Amsterdam	Tovmas Vanandetsi	The first publishing; editio princeps
2	1736	London	William and George Whiston	with a Latin translation; Historiae Armeniacae
3	1752	Venice	Anton Bortoli	"History of the Armenians"
4	1827	Venice	The Armenian Mechitarist Fathers of Venice	
5	1841	Venice	L. de Florivar	Italian and French translations
6	1843	Venice	The Armenian Mechitarist Fathers of Venice	
7	1845	Paris	The Armenian Mechitarist Fathers of Venice	
8	1864	Venice		
9	1881	Tiflis		
10	1881	Tiflis		
11	1913	Tiflis		facsimile ed., intro. by R. W. Thomson, 1981 Caravan Books, ISBN 978-0-88206-032-3
12	1910s (?)	Tiflis		

Under Soviet rule the book was published many times.

- R. W. Thomson, English translation, 1978 (Harvard, ISBN 978-0-674-39571-8).
- G. Kh. Sargsyan, Russian translation, 1991 (ISBN 9785808401853).
- R. W. Thomson, English translation, rev. ed. 2006 (Caravan Books, ISBN 978-0-88206-111-5).

== See also ==
- History of Armenia
- Zenob Glak
- John Mamikonean
- Gregory the Illuminator
- Roman relations with the Armenians
