= Ara the Handsome =

Legendary folk hero and king of Armenia

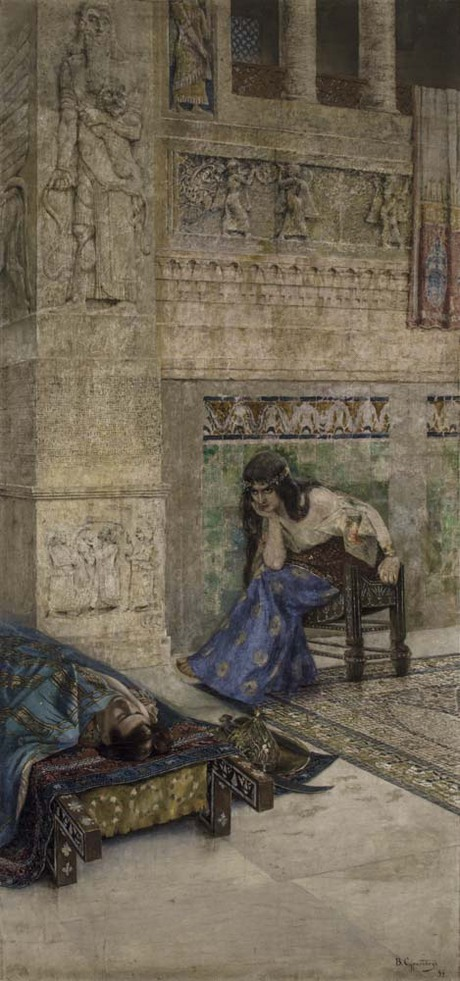
Shamiram stares at the corpse of Ara the Handsome (painting by Vardges Sureniants, 1899).

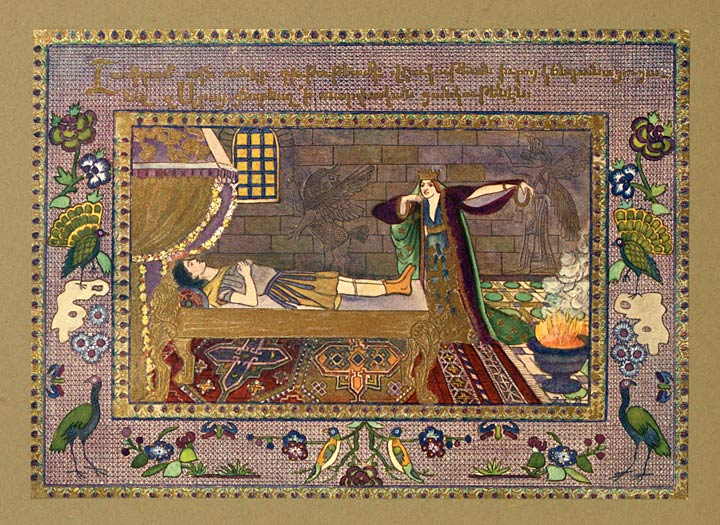
Ara and Semiramis, a modern illustration by Zabelle C. Boyajian (1916)

Ara the Handsome (or Ara the Beautiful, Armenian: Արա Գեղեցիկ, romanized: Ara Gełec‘ik) is a legendary Armenian hero and king. He is the son of the legendary king Aram and a descendant of the Armenian patriarch Hayk. Scholars believe that Ara, Aram, and Hayk were originally deities who were later reinterpreted as legendary human heroes. Ara represented a dying-and-rising agricultural god and is thought to have embodied fertility within the Indo-European triad of sovereignty, war, and fertility, along with Hayk and Aram. Ara is the subject of a popular legend in which the Assyrian queen Semiramis (Shamiram in Armenian), desiring the handsome Armenian king, wages war against Armenia to capture him and bring him back to her, alive. Ara is killed in the war, and Semiramis attempts to bring him back to life.

== Name ==
The etymology of the name Ara (also spelled Արայ, Aray) is uncertain, but it is phonologically similar to the Armenian descendants of Proto-Indo-European *h₂nḗr, such as ayr 'man'; some of the derivatives of this root begin with ar-, like ari 'brave'. The folk tale hero Ari Armaneli is considered to be a version of Ara the Handsome. The name has been compared with that of Ares, the Greek god of war; Ara, a figure in the Avesta; and with Er, a character in a tale recounted in Plato's Republic who returns from the dead (see below). In the Armenian tradition Ara's name is connected with the names of Mount Ararat, the province of Ayrarat, and Mount Aragats.

== Origin and parallels ==
Scholars believe that Ara and other descendants of the legendary Armenian patriarch Hayk were originally deities who were later reinterpreted as legendary human heroes. Ara was originally a dying-and-rising god who represented agriculture and the seasonal death and rebirth of nature in winter and spring. Stepan Ahyan and Georges Dumézil contend that Hayk, Aram and Ara the Handsome correspond to the triad of Indo-European mythology, representing sovereignty, war, and fertility, respectively. Ara's rival Shamiram, on the other hand, may be the reflection of the earliest Armenian mother goddess, who was later split into the three goddesses of the Armenian pantheon: Anahit, Astghik, and Nane. According to Armen Petrosyan, Ara's death at the hands of Shamiram marks the end of the "'sacred' mythical era of the forefathers of Armenia" and the beginning of "history" in Armenian mythology.

=== Parallels and later echoes ===
Ara is considered to be the Armenian version of a common Near Eastern mythical male figure who is the beautiful son or lover of a goddess; other expressions of this myth include Ishtar and Tammuz (Inanna and Dumuzid), Aphrodite and Adonis, and Cybele and Attis. He has also been compared with Hermaphroditus and Cupid-Eros. In James R. Russell's view, Movses Khorenatsi's telling of the legend in particular is likely a version of the story of Cybele and her beautiful lover and son Attis, who is killed but resurrects with the coming of spring. (Note: Petrosyan notes that Khorenatsi's version of the legend is "strongly influenced by Greek literary tradition.")

In the later Armenian historical epic known as the War of Persia (known from the 5th-century Buzandaran Patmutʻiwnkʻ), Mushegh Mamikonian corresponds to Ara, as he is placed on a tower to be revived by the mythical arlezes. After the Christianization of Armenia, the reverence of St. Sargis the General took on aspects of the earlier cult of Ara. Little Mher, one of the heroes of the Armenian national epic Daredevils of Sassoun, is thought to be connected with the legend of Ara. Mher enters a rock or a cave to one day be reborn. Ari Armaneli, a popular version of Ara, is also confined to a rock (or turned into stone) and later comes to life. The 10th-century historian Tovma Artsruni writes that a village called Lezk, near Van, was held to be the place of Ara's resurrection. The association between the village's name and the Armenian root lez, as in lizel 'to lick', in reference to the licking of Ara's wounds by the arlezes, is clear. This tradition was still current among the inhabitants of this village in the 19th century.

=== Plato's Myth of Er ===
Since the 19th century, scholars have connected the story of Ara the Handsome to the Myth of Er, told in Plato's Republic (10.614–10.621). The story begins as a man named Er (Ancient Greek: Ἤρ, gen.: Ἠρός), son of Armenios (Ἀρμένιος), of Pamphylia dies in battle. When the bodies of those who died in the battle are collected, ten days after his death, Er remains undecomposed. Two days later he revives on his funeral pyre and tells others of his journey in the afterlife, including an account of reincarnation and the celestial spheres of the astral plane. The tale includes the idea that moral people are rewarded and immoral people punished after death. Armen Petrosyan suggests that Plato's version reflects the original form of the story where Er (Ara) rises from the grave. James R. Russell opines that the Myth of Er draws from a version of the story of Ara changed to correspond to Zoroastrian beliefs after the coming of Zoroastrianism to Armenia in the Achaemenid period. Thus, Shamiram and the arlezes are excluded from the story while emphasis is placed on the journey to the afterlife and back, like in the Zoroastrian story of Wiraz.

=== Historical parallels ===
Apart from its mythological side, the legend of Ara and Shamiram may reflect the historical reality of the conflicts between Assyria and Urartu. The legendary Shamiram/Semiramis is based on the historical Assyrian queen Shammuramat, who lived in the 9th century BC. Scholars have also noted the similarity between the names of Ara's father Aram and the Urartian king Arame. David Marshall Lang suggests that Arame can be identified with Ara. M. Chahin speculates that Ara may be identifiable with Inushpua, who is mentioned once as the son and co-ruler of King Menua of Urartu. However, the historical associations of the legend have been regarded as later accretions onto a mythological core.

== Legend ==
According to the legend as told by the Armenian historian Movses Khorenatsi (and the anonymous Primary History formerly attributed to Sebeos), Semiramis (Shamiram in Armenian) had fallen in love with the handsome Armenian king and asked him to marry her. When Ara refused, Semiramis, in the heat of passion, gathered the armies of Assyria and marched against Armenia. During the battle Semiramis was victorious, but Ara was slain despite her orders to capture him alive. To avoid continuous warfare with the Armenians, Semiramis, reputed to be a sorceress, took his body and prayed to the gods (the arlezes) (Note: The arlez/aralez are not mentioned by name in Khorenatsi's version. He writes that Semiramis expected the gods to lick Ara's wounds to bring him back to life. The mythical creatures known as aralez, which lick the wounds of dead heroes to resurrect them, are mentioned in connection with Ara in the anonymous Primary History and are known from other Armenian sources as well.) to raise Ara from the dead. When the Armenians advanced to avenge their leader, Semiramis disguised one of her lovers as Ara and spread the rumor that the gods had brought Ara back to life, convincing the Armenians not to continue the war. In one persistent tradition, Semiramis' prayers are successful and Ara returns to life.

== Genealogy ==
In Movses Khorenatsi's History of Armenia, Ara the Handsome is presented as the son of Aram and a descendant of Hayk, the legendary forefather of the Armenians. Khorenatsi writes that Ara the Handsome had a son called Cardos by his wife, Nuard (Nvard). He was later renamed Ara by Semiramis because of her love for the late Ara. Ara/Cardos, who was twelve years old at the time of his father's death, was appointed ruler of Armenia by Semiramis and later died in a war against her.

Paternal descent according to Movses Khorenatsi:

1. Hayk
2. Aramaneak
3. Aramayis
4. Amasia
5. Gegham
6. Harmay
7. Aram
8. Ara the Handsome

== Cultural depictions ==
Ara and Shamiram are depicted in an 1899 painting by Vardges Sureniants. The Armenian author Nairi Zarian wrote a tragedy titled Ara Geghetsik based on the story of Ara and Shamiram.

== See also ==
- Armenian mythology
- Anushawan
