= Aralez (mythology) =

Dog-like creature in Armenian mythology

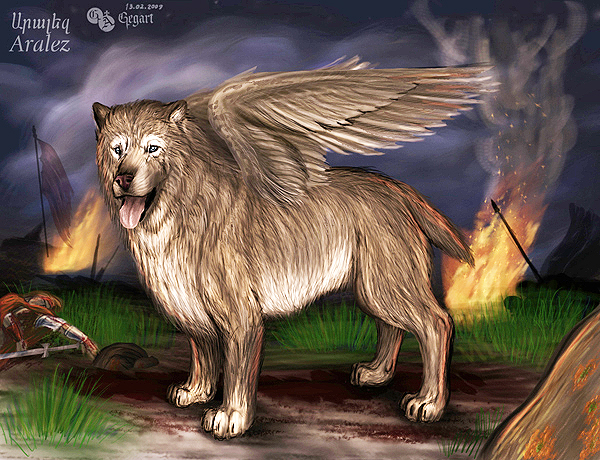
An artistic description of Aralez

Aralez (Old Armenian: արալէզ, արալեզ; plural: արալէզք, aralēzkʿ), also called arlez (առլեզ) or yaralez (յարալէզ, Modern Armenian haralez), are winged dog-like creatures or spirits in Armenian mythology that descend upon dead heroes to lick their wounds in order to resurrect them.

== Mythology and history ==
The aralez are most prominently associated with the story of the legendary Armenian king Ara the Handsome. According to this legend, the Assyrian queen Semiramis (Shamiram) called on the aralez to lick the wounds of and revive Ara the Handsome after he was killed in battle. By popular interpretation, this was the origin of the word aralez, from the name "Ara" and lez, the root of the word lizel 'to lick'. Aralex are said to live on Mount Ararat, a sacred landmark in Armenia.

According to the Armenian history attributed to Faustus of Byzantium, after Mushegh Mamikonian was killed, his relatives placed his corpse on a tower, hoping that the aralezes would revive him. This indicates that belief in the aralez was still current in fourth- and fifth-century Armenia, following the Christianization of the country.

It has been suggested that tower-like structures in Armenia and Anatolia may have been associated with belief in the aralez.

== Etymology ==
The etymology of the word aralez is disputed. Interpretations of the word as being composed of the name "Ara (the Handsome)" and lez, or har ('eternally') and lez are regarded as folk etymologies.

== See also ==
- Q'ursha
- Valravn: a mythological creature that sometimes appears as a winged canine

== Bibliography ==
- Acharian, Hrachia (1971). "Aṛlez". Hayeren armatakan baṛaran [Armenian Etymological Dictionary] (in Armenian). Vol. 1. Erevani hamalsarani hratarakchʻutʻyun. pp. 260–261.
- Chahin, M. (2001). The Kingdom of Armenia: A History. Psychology Press. p. 74. ISBN 9780700714520.
- Blanchard, Monica Jay; Young, Robin Darling (1998). Eznik of Kołb, On God. Peeters Publishers. p. 92. ISBN 9789042900134.
- Garsoïan, Nina G. (1989). The Epic Histories Attributed to Pʻawstos Buzand (Buzandaran Patmutʻiwnkʻ). Cambridge, Massachusetts: Harvard University Press. pp. 351–352. ISBN 0-674-25865-7.
- Katvalian, M. (1983). "Haralezner". In Arzumanian, Makich (ed.). Armenian Soviet Encyclopedia (in Armenian). Vol. 6. Yerevan: Armenian Encyclopedia. p. 277.
- Russell, James R. (1987). Zoroastrianism in Armenia. Cambridge, Massachusetts: Harvard University Press. ISBN 0-674-96850-6.
- Tashjian, Virginia A., ed. (2007). The Flower of Paradise and Other Armenian Tales. Translated by Bonnie C. Marshall. Libraries Unlimited. p. 27. ISBN 9781591583677.
