= Armenian mythology =

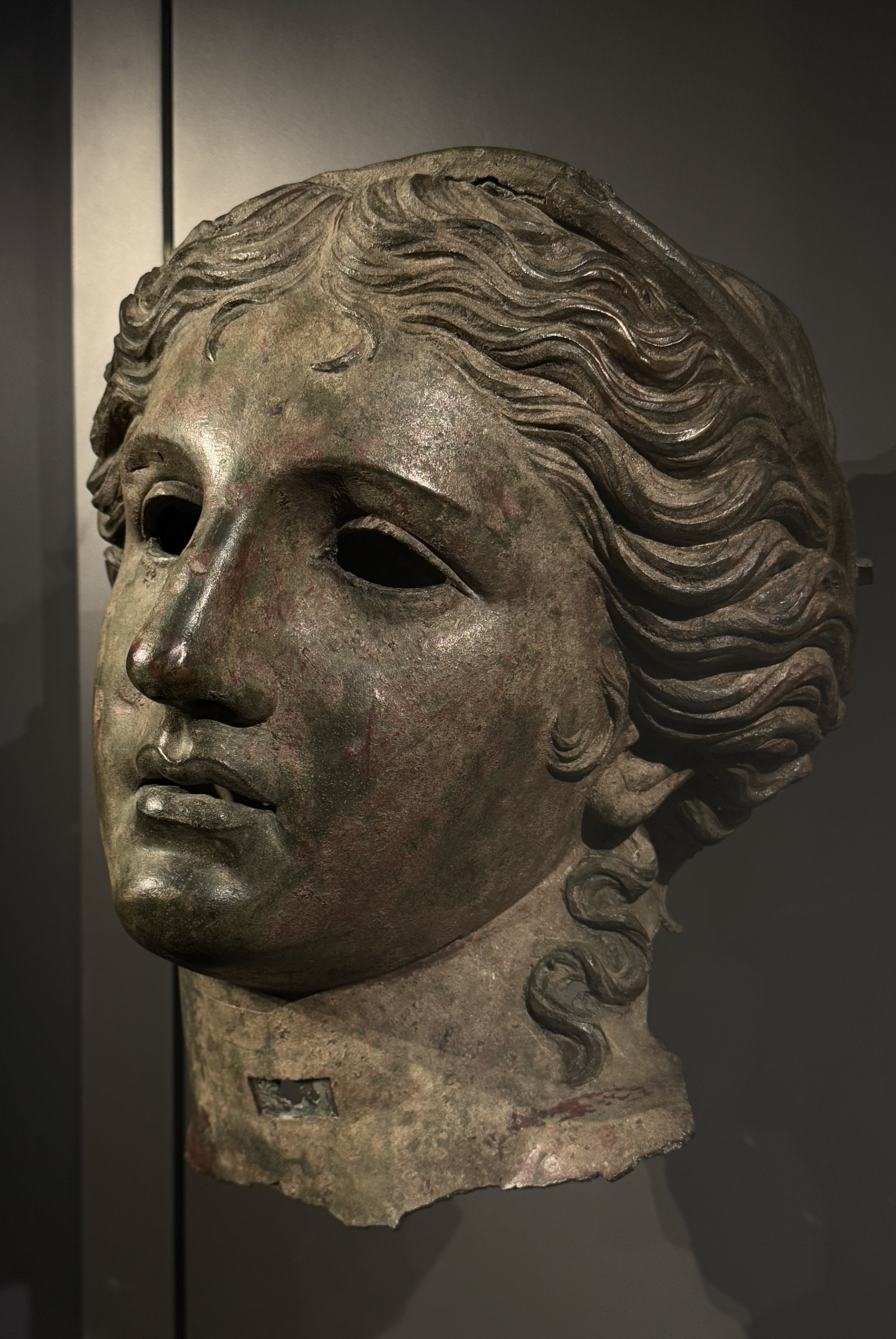
- A bronze head of Aphrodite from Satala sometimes identified as Anahit

Armenian mythology (Armenian: Հայկական դիցաբանություն, romanized: haykakan dicʻabanutʻyun) is the mythology of the Armenian people of the Armenian highlands. Over the centuries Armenian mythology has incorporated figures and stories from Urartian, Caucasian, Mespotamian, Indo-European, Greek, Hurrian, Hittite, Turkic and Iranian mythologies.

== History ==
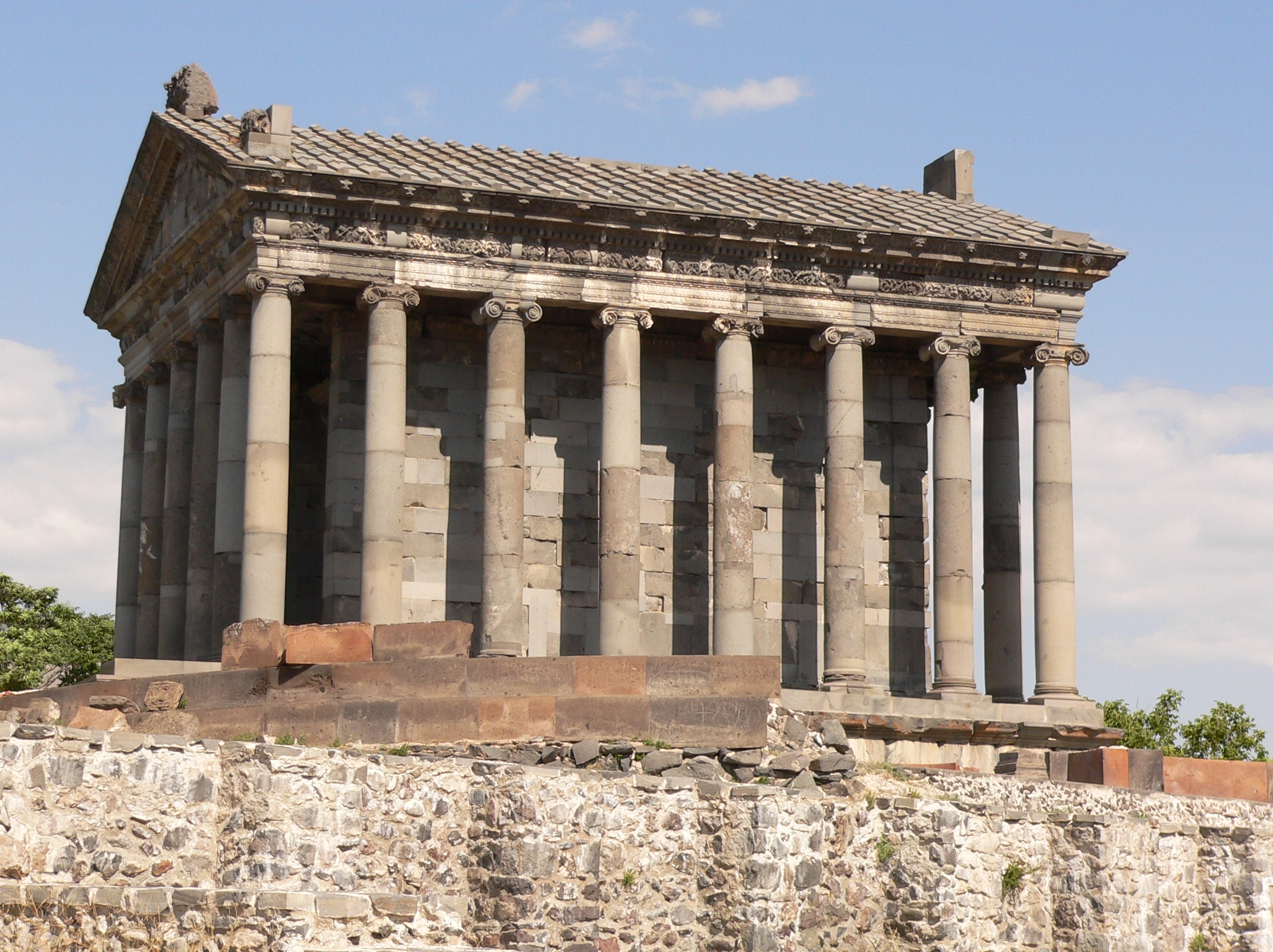
Side view of the Temple of Garni

Armenian mythology is partially inherited from the mythologies of the Proto-Indo-European-speaking peoples and other peoples of the Armenian Highlands. Among the oldest attested cults are those of eagles, lions and the sky. Due to Iranian influence on Armenia starting in the 1st millennium BCE, Zoroastrianism and Mazdaism strongly impacted Armenian mythology. Armenian people syncretized their mythology, which mixed Iranian elements with Armenian ones. For example, Vanatur later became subordinate to Aramazd (the Parthian form of Ahura Mazda). After the adoption of Christianity in the 4th century CE, the ancient myths became increasingly syncretised with Christian mythology.

== Pantheon ==
The pantheon of pre-Christian Armenia changed over the centuries. The pantheon was modified through Hurrian, Urartian, Mesopotamian, Iranian, and Greek influences. Zoroastrian impacts were especially strong, though conversion was incomplete and syncretistic, and the Persians and Armenians never appeared to identify with each other as co-religionists despite both referring to themselves as "Mazda worshipers."

- Amanor (Ամանոր) – "The bearer of new fruits" (the god of the new year, Navasard). May or may not have been the same god as Vanatur.
- Anadatus (Անադատուս) - The Armenian form of the Zoroastrian Amesha Spenta Ameretat.
- Anahit (Անահիտ) – Cognate of the Iranian Anahita. Probably originally related to Sumerian Inanna and Babylonian Anunit (Ishtar, Astarte) prior to Iranian presence in the region. The goddess of fertility and birth, and daughter or wife of Aramazd, Anahit is also identified with Artemis and Aphrodite. Temples dedicated to Anahit were established in Ani-Kammakh, Armavir, Artashat, Ashtishat. Ani is likely a derivation or alternate form of Anahit.
- Aramazd (Արամազդ) – Cognate of the Iranian Ahura Mazda (or Ormazd), possibly mixed with Ara or Aram. Head of the pantheon, identified with Zeus in the interpretatio graeca, with whom he shared many titles. Along with Anahit and Vahagn formed a lead triad. Equated with Vanatur and Aram and Ara, all of which he took aspects from. In time, the positive functions of Baal Shamin were absorbed by Aramazd.
- Astłik (Աստղիկ) - cognate to the Mesopotamian goddess Inanna, identified with Venus. A fertility goddess and consort of Vahagn, sharing a temple with him in the city of Ashtishat. The holiday of Vardavar was originally in honor of Astɫik. The name "Astɫik" derives from astɫ (Աստղ) "star" from Proto-Indo-European *h₂stḗr plus the Armenian diminutive suffix -ik.
- Barsamin (Բարշամին) – God of sky and weather, derived from the Semitic god Baal Shamin.
- Mihr (Միհր) – Cognate with the Iranian Mithra. God of the sun and light, son of Aramazd, the brother of Anahit and Nane. Historically, despite his high place in the pantheon, worship of Mihr was eclipsed by Vahagn (indeed, Mihr's worship appears to have been supplementary to Vahagn's), and little is known about his worship aside from similarities to the Iranian Mithra and the absence of the Mithraic mysteries. Mihr was identified with Hephaestus by Movses Khorenatsi and later authors. His center of worship was located in Bagaharich, and the temple of Garni was dedicated to him.
- Nane (Նանե) – Cognate of the Elamitic Nanē, (via the Babylonian Nanâ), also assimilating aspects of the Phrygian Cybele. Daughter of Aramazd, sister of Anahit and Mihr. A goddess of motherhood, war, and wisdom. Identified with Athena. Her cult was related to Anahit, both of their temples located near each other in Gavar.
- Omanos (Օմանոս) – The Armenian form of the Zoroastrian Vohu Manah.
- Spandaramet (Սպանդարամետ) – Cognate of the Iranian Spenta Armaiti, a daughter of Aramazd, and cthonic goddess of fertility, vineyards and the underworld. Spandaramet was chosen by translators of some Armenian Bibles to convey the meaning of Διόνυσος) in 2 Maccabees 6:7. Sometimes called Sandaramet or Santamaret denoting a connection to the underworld unique to Armenian theology, even in Christian writings. Her kingdom is said to be inhabited by evil spirits called Santarametakans.
- Tir (Տիր) or Tiur – Cognate to either the Iranian Tir (or Tishtrya) or (via Armenian dpir "scribe") the Babylonian Nabu. In either case, the mercurial god of wisdom, written language, culture, and science; messenger of the gods and psychopomp. Identified with the Greek Apollo. Tir's role as psychopomp may have been absorbed from the Luwian thunder god Tarhunda, whose name had been used to translate that of the Mesopotamian underworld god Nergal. Tir's temple was located near Artashat.
- Vahagn (Վահագն) – A "k'aj" (քաջ brave). Etymologically derived from Iranian Verethragna (via Vahram -> Vram -> Vam + -agn), however, the Armenian Vahagn had little to do with his Iranian namesake. The storm god and dragon slayer, identified with the Greek Hercules, this identification went full circle when Armenian translators of the Bible used Vahagn to translate Ἡρακλῆς in 2 Maccabees 4:19. Sometimes referred to by the title Tsovean, particularly in his role as a god of the seas. Vahagn may have originally been the Hayasan god, Terittitunni, who adopted some features of the Hurro-Urartian storm god Teshub/Teisheba. Christian folklore absorbed Vahagn's role as a storm or weather god into the archangel Gabriel. Derik housed the central temple to Vahagn.
- Vanatur (Վանատուր) – Either meaning "the Lord of Van" or "giving asylum", Vanatur was the god of hospitality. He may or may not have been the same god as Amanor. Later equated with Aramazd and Zeus.

=== Reconstructed deities ===
These gods are reconstructed through linguistics, folklore studies and comparative mythology. There is no certainty in regard to their actual existence, as they are unattested in any historical or archaeological sources.

- Angeł – "the Invisible" (literally: "unseen"), god of the underworld. The main temple of Angeł was located at Angeł-tun (House of Angeł), which possibly corresponded to the Ingalova of Hittite and Ingelene/Ingilena of Greek and Latin records, likely located near modern Eğil. Comparable with Nergal and Hades.
- Areg (Arev) (Արեգ) or Ar (Ար) - god of the Sun, comparable with Mesopotamian Utu. Likely also known as, or developed into, Ara. This god was probably mentioned on the Urartian-era Door of Meher (as Ara or Arwaa). Linguists Martin E. Huld and Birgit Anette Olsen state that the word arew (Արև) is cognate to the Indian name Ravi, also meaning "sun". This etymological connection, argues H. Martirosyan, indicates an inherited Armeno-Aryan poetical expression.
- Ayg (Այգ) - goddess of the dawn.

== Spirits ==
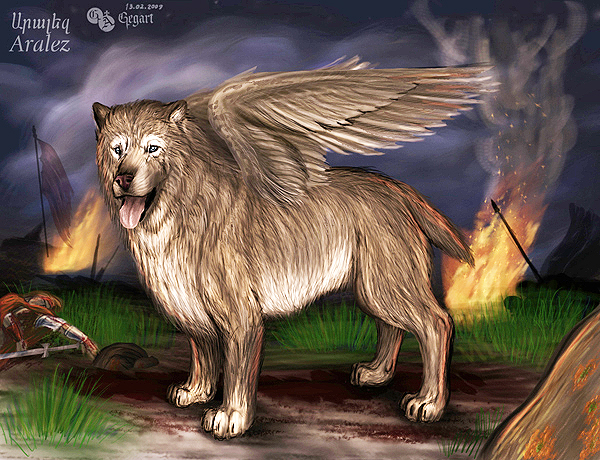
Aralez on the battlefield

Armenian mytholgical monsters are creatures that resemble animals but are unnaturally shaped, are a mixture of different animals, half-sentient, or half-insentient. The Classical Armenian demons and spirits have been studied many times in literature and typically are of Iranian or Semitic origin. Although it is accepted the majority are of Iranian origin, the extent of the influence has not been determined. Some of the Armenian demons of Iranian origin can be easily tied to their Iranian versions such as the Iranian Devk with the Armenian Dév. In later periods the names became more descriptive-forms or plainly ideophones. There was also a turn for the Semitic names prevailing. The majority of later Armenian demons are female and come from the southern and south-western areas of Historical Armenia.

- Al – The Al is a dwarfish evil spirit that attacks pregnant women and steals newborn babies. Described as half-animal and half-man, its teeth are of iron and nails of brass or copper. It usually wears a pointed hat covered in bells, and can become invisible.
- Andndayin ōj (Անդնդային օձ), "the Abyssal Serpent" that lived in the black waters surrounding the world tree.
- Aralez – Aralezner – The oldest gods in the Armenian pantheon, Aralez are dog-like creatures (modeled on Gampr) with powers to resuscitate fallen warriors and resurrect the dead by licking wounds clean.
- Azhdahak
- Dakhanavar – a vampire who sucked the blood from victims' feet, preying on newcomers to his valleys.
- Devs – The Dev are air-composed spirit creatures originating from Zoroastrian mythology (the Daevas), and share many similarities to angels and demons. They reside in stony places and ruins, and usually keep to themselves.
- Gishervan Merer: Gishervan Merer, translates to "mothers of the night," is an Armenian legend about spirits of the night which appear as elderly women dressed in black. Their goal is to steal the sun and if they were to succeed the entire human race would go extinct and the entire world would be shrouded in eternal darkness. It is said they live in old mills, dried wells, mountain gaps, and in a world hidden under the sea. At sunset the spirits believed the sun hid under the Earth so they rushed after it but once they finally made it to the other side of the globe it would already be too late and dusk would have taken place. In their dismay they exhale darkness which covers the entire world and would proceed to mischievously cause misfortune to human beings. This legend was recorded in the second half of the nineteenth century in Van by the enlightened bishop Garegin Sruanjteanc'. It is witnessed nowhere else in Armenia and the account of Sruanjteanc' is the only one. Scholars believe these spirits are nothing more than a metaphor for nighttime.
- Grogh: An ancient spirit who recorded the lives of individuals from their birth to their death. Its name translates to "writer" in the Armenian language. When a human being is born Grogh would record the infant into the book of lifeand then began to scribe their deeds both good and bad. When the human being passes away Grogh claimed their soul and read back their life to them during their final judgment which is how the fate of the soul is decided. Some believe that it is best to open the windows in order to allow Grogh entrance into the house of an individual who's in agony and would not easily part ways with their soul. In certain myths Grogh is identified with the god of writing and knowledge and the scribe of the gods named Tir.
- K'aǰs: A class of mythical creatures which are often described as spirits or demons. They are known to resemble Devs and Višaps. As for more unique characteristics, it is said that they dwell in mountains and other times are known for possessing temples. The K'aǰs hunt, fight, and steal wheat and wine from people. They are thought to control whirlwinds as well as being born only during sun showers, when it rains while the sun is shining. The way to kill a K'aǰ is by striking them with a lightning bolt. There are many tales about how these creatures originated. In some traditions it is thought they were the grandsons of Noah. "According to the folk tradition, the k'a s originate from one of the sons and the daughter of Noah named Astłik." (Petrosyan, 2020) However, in the pre-Christian pantheon Astłik was the goddess of love and the bride of Vahagn. In the pre-Christian version, it is suggested that the K'aǰs are both the sons and followers of Vahagn.
- Nhang – The Nhang was a river-dwelling serpent-monster with shape shifting powers, often connected to the more conventional Armenian dragons. The creature could change into a seal or lure a man by transforming into a woman, then drag in and drown the victim to drink its blood. The word "Nhang" is sometimes used as a generic term for a sea-monster in ancient Armenian literature.
- Piatek – The Piatek is a large mammalian creature similar to a wingless griffin.
- Shahapet – The Shahapet (Շահապետ), also called Khshathrapti, Shavod, Shoithrapaiti, Shvaz and Shvod, were usually friendly guardian spirits who could also be evil of Armenian, Slavic and Persian mythology, who typically appeared in the form of serpents. They inhabited houses, orchards, fields, forests and graveyards, among other places. The Shvaz type was more agriculturally oriented, while the Shvod was a guardian of the home. The Shvod were known to dwell within the walls of the homes, or the stable, throughout the winter months. As spring comes the spirit is banished through a ritual called Švot-outing known in Armenian as Švotahan. The ritual takes place on the final night of the month of February where the eldest woman chantes "Out with the Švot; in with Adar (March)!" and bangs on the walls with a broom or strips of leather. Since February is the month that the Švot is exiled from the home it is also the month where the spirit gets most active and mischievous believed to stimulate thoughts of love and procreation as springtime approaches. Some believed that the Švot would not leave gently and instead attempt to retaliate. "For according to beliefs recorded in various places, after being driven out of the house the Švot might try to sneak back in, in the form of a cat, or in the guise of a relative returning after a long absence. Then, in a mischievous or vindictive mood it might invite people out for a long walk, lead them astray, and abandon them." (Russel, 2013.) Many regions within Armenia have their unique takes on this spirit. For example, in Malatya they thought the Švot was an invisible being that deceived people and lead them to faraway places. While in Datem, they associated the Švot with a spring and when children would played too closely to the spring it would kidnap them. A Shvod who is well-treated may reward the home's inhabitants with gold, but if mistreated might cause strife and leave.
- Vishap – A dragon closely associated with water, similar to the Leviathan. It is usually depicted as a winged snake or with a combination of elements from different animals. Prior to Iranian domination in Armenia, the dragons may have been called "geł". May have been connected to Hurrian Ullikummi and Hittite Illuyanka.

== Heroes and folk characters ==
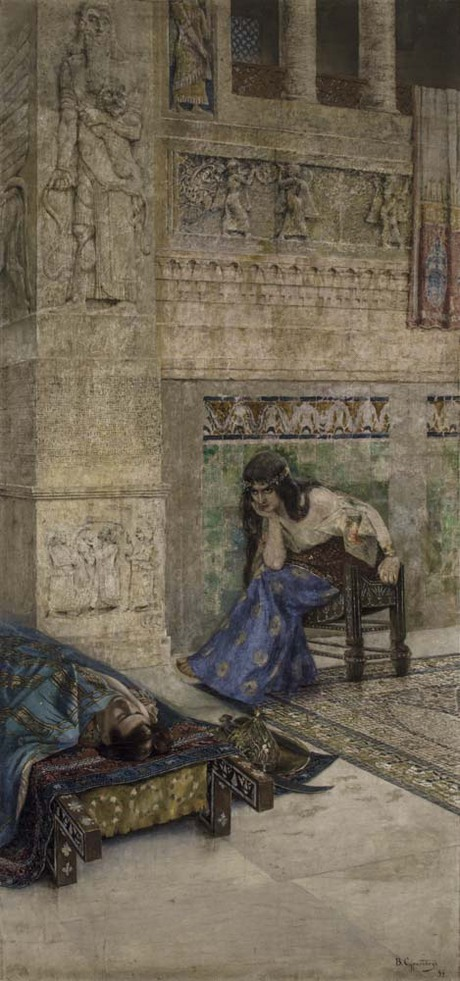
Shamiram stares at the corpse of Ara the Beautiful (painting by Vardges Sureniants, 1899).

These figures are mainly known through post-Christian sources, but have belonged to the pre-Christian mythology. Many seem to be derived from Proto-Indo-European mythologies and religious traditions. It is suspected that Hayk, Ara, and Aram could have been deities originally.

- Aram, slayer of the giant Barsamin, possibly originally a war god known as Aremenius. Father of Ara. The name Aram is likely an Armenian that directly developed from Proto-Indo-European *rēmo-, meaning "black". The name is related to Hindu Rama. (Note: Armen Petrosyan argues that both Armenian Aram and Indic Rama derive from a "common" Indo-European myth about a hero whose name means black (PIE *h₂reh₁mo-) defeating a foe named "bright, white, silver" (PIE *h₂erg-).)
- Ara the Handsome, son of Aram. A handsome warrior slain in a war against Semiramis, in some versions brought back to life by her prayers. Possibly, originally a personified version of the sun god Ar (Arev), likely mentioned on the Urartian-era Door of Meher.
- Hayk, legendary forefather of the Armenians, who led a successful rebellion against a Babylonian king named Bel. When Bel and his armies pursued Hayk and his people, Hayk fired an arrow across the battle field, killing Bel and scaring off his forces. Said to have been a giant. Possibly, a thunder/storm god originally. Equated with Ḫaldi, Mitra, and Orion. The name Hayk may derive from Proto-Indo-European *poti– (lord, master, patriarch).
- Karapet, a pre-Christian Armenian mythological character identified with John the Baptist after the adoption of Christianity by the Armenians. Karapet is usually represented as a glittering long-haired thunder-god with a purple crown and a cross.
- Nimrod, great-grandson of Noah and the king of Shinar, Nimrod is depicted in the Bible as both a man of power in the earth and a mighty hunter.
- Nvard (Նվարդ) – Wife of Ara the Handsome.
- Sanasar and Baghdasar, two brothers founded the town of Sason, ushering in the eponymous state. Sanasar was considered the ancestor of several generations of heroes of Sassoon. It is said that their mother was subject to a miraculous pregnancy, by drinking water from a certain fountain.
- Sargis, a hero, associated with pre-Christian myths, later identified with Christian saints who bore the same name. He is represented as a tall, slender, handsome knight mounted upon a white horse. Sarkis is able to raise the wind, storms and blizzards, and turn them against enemies.
- Shamiram, the legendary queen of the Neo-Assyrian Empire who waged war to get Ara.
- Tork Angegh (Տորք Անգեղ) – "Given by Angeł". A great-grandson of Hayk. A monstrous and ugly hero. Threw massive boulders to sink enemy ships in the Black Sea. Sometimes equated with Thor and Polyphemus and possibly Tarḫunna.
- Tsovinar (Ծովինար) – "Nar of the Sea", the mother of Sanasar and Baghdasar.
- Yervaz and Yervant (Classical Armenian: Eruaz and Eruand), mythical twins born from a woman of the Arsacid dynasty of Armenia, distinguished by enormous features and over-sensitivity.

== Comparative mythology ==
=== Hayasan ===
Not much is known about the Hayasan pantheon, but some names survive via Hittite records. Any connections to Armenians are uncertain; many scholars believe that there is a connection and link some Hayasan and Armenian deities. Ugur is associated with Angegh, Hayk, or Ar; Teritttunnis with Vahagn and Inanna may be an early form of Anahit. There is also a number of possible Armenianisms, such as the -ik suffix and an early form of Astvats.

=== Urartian ===
Arubani has been associated with Anahit. The moon goddess Selardi is possibly the sister of Artinis (from Armenian siela 'sister'; ardi 'sun god').

== Folk stories ==
- Ojmanuk, Arevmanuk
- Altun Bash Balygh
- Habermani
- Nourie Hadig
- Artsat Mazer, Voski Tsamer
- Zoulvisia

== Literary fairytales ==
- Anahit

== See also ==
- Armenian eternity sign
- Armenian taraz
- Armenian Zoroastrianism
- Ashugh
- Azerbaijani mythology and folklore
- Carahunge
- Georgian mythology
- Gusans
- Hetanism
- Iranian folklore
- Islamic mythology
- Khachkar
- Kurdish mythology
- List of mythologies
- Madagh
- Mazandarani mythology
- Nart saga
- Ossetian mythology
- Religion in Armenia
- Sasna Crer
- Sassanid Armenia
- Talysh mythology
- Trndez
- Tukh Manuk
- Turkish folklore
- Ughtasar Petroglyphs
- Vishapakar
- Vardavar

== Bibliography ==
- Petrosyan, Armen (2002). The Indo‑european and Ancient Near Eastern Sources of the Armenian Epic. Washington, D.C. : Institute for the Study of Man. ISBN 9780941694810.
- Petrosyan, Armen (2007). "State Pantheon of Greater Armenia: Earliest Sources". Aramazd: Armenian Journal of Near Eastern Studies. 2: 174–201. ISSN 1829-1376.
- Ahyan, Stepan (1982). "Les débuts de l'histoire d'Arménie et les trois fonctions indo-européennes". Revue de l'histoire des religions. 199 (3): 251–271. doi:10.3406/rhr.1982.4670.
- Gelzer, Heinrich (1896). "Zur armenischen Götterlehre". Berichte über die Verhandlungen der Königlich Sächsischen Gesellschaft der Wissenschaften zu Leipzig: 99–148. OCLC 665221528.
