= Hayko (disambiguation) =

Hayko (in Armenian Հայկո) or Haigo in Western Armenian is an Armenian first name derived from the Armenian given name Hayk (in Armenian Հայկ), Haig in Western Armenian.

Hayko may refer to:

- Hayko (1977–2021), Armenian pop singer who represented Armenia in the Eurovision Song Contest in 2007.
- Hayko Cepkin (born 1978), Turkish musician, singer, songwriter of Armenian descent
- Hayko Mko (born 1976), Armenian comedic duo made up of Hayk Marutyan (Hayko) and Mkrtich Arzumanyan (Mko)
- HT Hayko (born 1985), Armenian rapper
- Spitakci Hayko (born 1974), Armenian rabiz singer, also known by the mononym Hayko

== See also ==
- Hayk (Armenian: Հայկ) or in Western Armenian Hayg, also known as Haik Nahapet, legendary patriarch and founder of the Armenian nation
