= Sisak (eponym) =

Sisak (Armenian: Սիսակ) was the legendary ancestor of the Armenian princely house of Syuni, also called Siunids, Syunid and Syuni. The Armenian historian Movses Khorenatsi states that Sisak was the brother of Harmar who was known as Arma, son of Gegham and a descendant of the legendary patriarch of the Armenians, Hayk. Gegham had taken up residence near Lake Sevan and, following his death, the lands encompassing the areas from Lake Sevan to the Araxes River were inherited by Sisak. The region assumed Sisak's name (Armenian: Սիսական; Sisakan) after he died, and those who descended from his dynastic line were known in Armenian as Syunis (in Armenian, Սյունիներ; Syuniner) or Sisakyaner (Սիսակյաններ). After the Kingdom of Armenia introduced the system of administrative divisions known as nahangs (provinces) in the second century B.C., the Siunis were confirmed by King Vologases (Vagharshak) the Parthian as the lords of the province of Syunik.
