= Mar Abas Katina =

Chaldean scholar

Mar Abas Katina (Assyrian: ܡܪ ܐܒܐ ܩܛܛܝܢܐ Mār Awā Qațțīnā; Armenian: Մար Աբաս Կատինա) was a Chaldean scholar, presumably an ancient Syrian (or ancient Armenian) historian. Mar Abas Katina first appears in the work of the 5th‑century Armenian historian Movses Khorenatsi, who cites him extensively as an authority for early Armenian traditions. His writings were said to draw upon records preserved in the Assyrian royal archives at Nineveh, and according to tradition were transmitted to Armenia during the reign of King Valarsace of the Arsacid dynasty of Armenia. His work served as the primary source for nearly the entirety of the first book and the first nine chapters of the second book of Khorenatsi's History of Armenia, shaping narratives about Armenia's legendary origins, its early rulers, and its connections with neighboring civilizations. Although modern scholars such as Étienne Quatremère and Ernest Renan have questioned whether Mar Abas Katina was a historical author or a literary construct, within Armenian historiography he remains a pivotal figure for understanding how Khorenatsi framed Armenia's past.

== Name ==
The name Mar Abas Katina translates to "Lord Aba the Wise". Movses Khorenatsi and Sebeos made great use of his work when writing the first parts of their works. Sebeos calls him "Maraba the philosopher Mtsurnatsi". (Note: Mtsurantsi indicates that he was born or lived for a long time in the city of Mtsurkh (changed to Mtsbin) in Greater Armenia) Movses' placement of Mar Abas in the 2nd century BC is apparently an anachronism for a number of reasons, the main one being the particle "Mar" (Syrian: ܡܪܝ) in Abas' name, which is a Christian honorary title used for bishops and saints.

== Mythical origin ==
Mar Abas Katina was a learned Syrian, who, probably lived about 150 years before Christ, wrote a book upon the origin of the Armenians, from what he had found in some book preserved in the Archives of Nineveh. He was secretary to king Valarsace.

Arshak the Great, according to Movses, after casting off the Macedonian yoke and conquering Assyria, set his brother, Vargharshak, on the throne of Armenia. So commences the Arsacid dynasty. The new king wished to know what kind of men had been ruling the country before him. Was he the successor of brave men or of bad men. He found an intelligent man, a Syrian, named Mar Abas Katina, and sent him to his brother, Arshak the Great, with this letter

"To Arshak, the king of the earth and the sea, whose form and person are like unto the gods and whose triumphs are above those of all kings; the greatness of whose mind can fathom all things of earth, Wargharshak, the youngest brother and comrade in arms, appointed by thee King of Armenia, greeting, Victory ever attend thee.

— Movses Khorenatsi, History of Armenia

This Syrian (says the historian) found in the library at Nineveh a book translated from the Chaldean into Greek, by order of Alexander the Great, which contained various ancient histories. From this book Mar Abas copied only the authentic history of Armenia, which he took back to Vargharshak, who, esteeming this document his most precious treasure, preserved it with great care in his palace and engraved part of it on a stone monument.

It is this document of Mar Abas Katina that Movses of Khorene cites as his chief authority for the early authentic history of Armenia, though he also mentions several other native and foreign writers as sources of his work. With regard to these statements, critics point out that the library of Nineveh was not in existence in the second century B.C, as it was destroyed in 625 B.C.; some even maintain that Mar Abas Katina was a fictitious personage, invented by Movses Khorenatsi to give more weight to his own statements, in accordance with the universal custom of his time, when contemporary writings were continually ascribed to the great men of old or even to imaginary characters. As to Mar Abas Katina, although his book may not have been compiled under the circumstances described in the History, Movses may have believed that he was the author of the book in his possession. Professor Mar has even found, in Arabic literature, some independent traces of Mar Abas Katina.
