= Zabelle Boyajian =

Armenian painter, writer, and translator

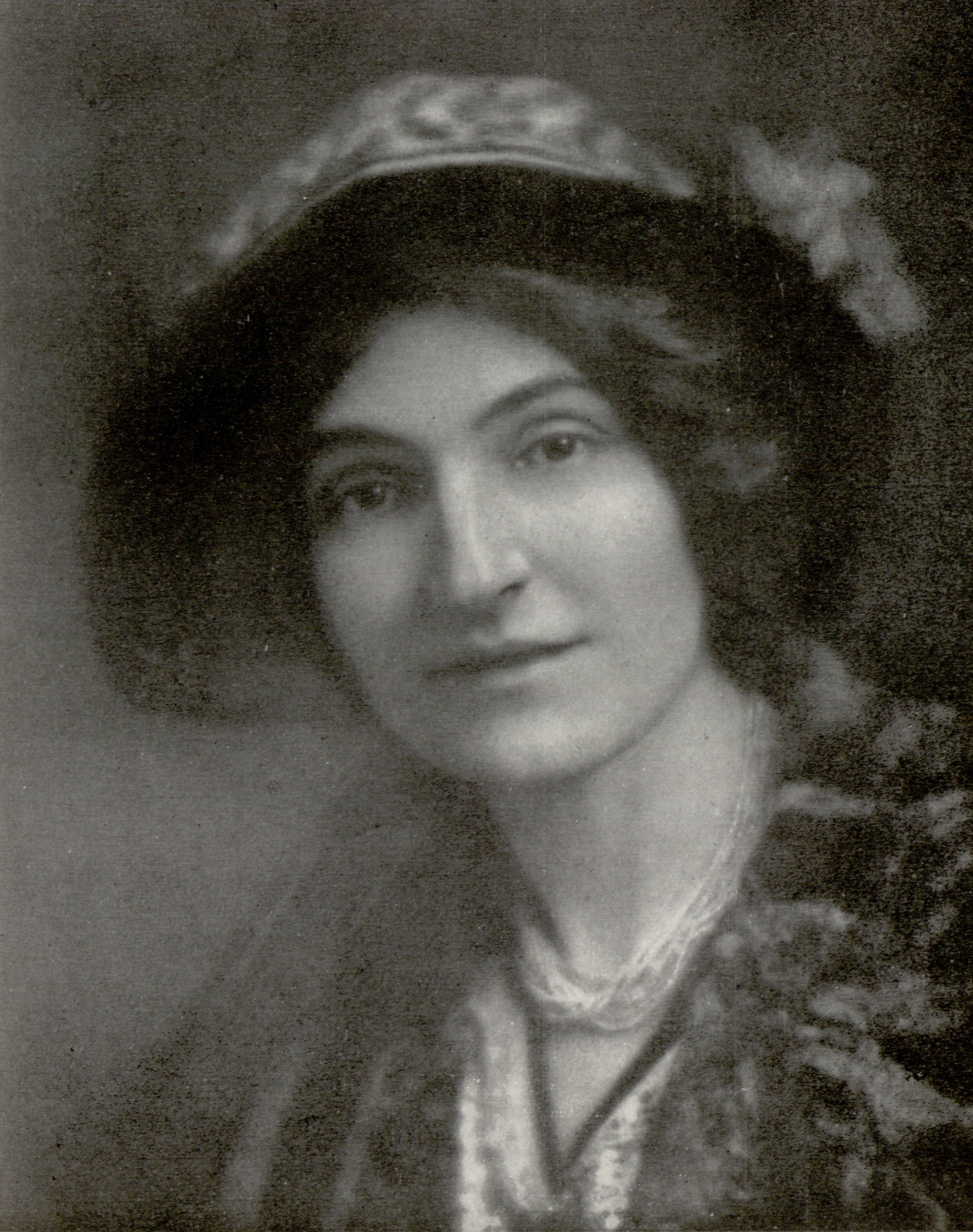
- Born: Zabelle C. Boyajian; 1873; Diyarbakır, Ottoman Empire
- Died: 26 January 1957 (aged 83–84); London, United Kingdom
- Known for: Writing, Painting

Zabelle C. Boyajian (Armenian: Զապել Պոյաճեան) (1873 – 26 January 1957) was an Armenian painter, writer, and translator, who lived most of her life in London.

== Biography ==
Zabelle C. Boyajian was born in Diyarbakır in the Diyarbekir Vilayet of the Ottoman Empire (one of the ancient Armenian capitals, Tigranakert) into the family of the British Vice-Consul in Diyarbakır and Harput Thomas Boyajian and Catherine Rogers, a descendant of the English poet Samuel Rogers. After her father's murder during the Hamidian massacres, in 1895, Boyajian, her mother and her brother, Henry, moved to London, where she enrolled at the Slade School of Fine Art. She also started writing and illustrating her own books. Her first novel, Yestere: The Romance of a Life, about the massacres in Sasun, was published under the pen name Varteni (London, 1901). She was very close with Anna Raffi, the wife of the Armenian novelist Raffi, and her two sons, Aram and Arshak, who had moved to London after Raffi's death. Boyajian periodically translated and published excerpts from Raffi's novels in the journal Ararat and organized various reading events to honor his work. In 1916, she compiled and translated the anthology Armenian Legends and Poems (1916), which was introduced by Viscount James Bryce and which included several poems in Alice Stone Blackwell's translation. She traveled widely and in 1938 published her travel notes and illustrations of Greece, In Greece with Pen and Palette. In 1948 she translated and published Avetik Isahakian's epic poem Abu Lala Mahari. Boyajian also wrote essays on Shakespeare, Byron, Euripides, Michael Arlen, Raffi, and Avetik Isahakian, as well as comparative works on English and Armenian literature.

As a painter, Boyajian had her individual exhibitions in London in 1910 and 1912, in Germany in 1920, in Egypt in 1928, in France, in Italy, and in Belgium between 1940-50.

Boyajian died on 26 January 1957 in London.

== Books ==
- Armenian Legends and Poems. Trans. Z. C. Boyajian. New York: Columbia University Press, 1st ed., 1916.
- Gilgamesh: A Dream of the Eternal Quest. London: George W. Jones, 1924.
- In Greece with Pen and Palette. London: J.M. Dent & Sons, 1938.

== Critical reception ==
The Contemporary Review (December 1916) wrote about the anthology Armenian Legends and Poems:

Here is a magnificent book ... Noble garland of Armenian flowers, and gallery of pictures that Miss Boyajian has given us—pictures in which the pre-Raphaelite note is splendidly dominant; pre-Raphaelite, that is to say, Byzantine or Armenian art revived.

Scotsman (November 18, 1916) wrote:

Readers who are curious concerning Armenia and Armenians may learn more about them from this attractive volume than from many books of heavier erudition. It is an anthology of translations from Armenian poems, accompanied by a learned and interesting disquisition by Mr. Aram Raffi on the epics, folk-songs and poetry of Armenia ... It is impossible to read its graceful, varied, and musical verses without realizing that the choice has been directed by an intimate knowledge of the country's characteristic literature and that the pieces included are rendered with a skill that knows how to bring over to another language some of its typical accents and inspirations ... The color work is indeed particularly fine, and will be admired by all who know how to appreciate good work.

The Manchester Guardian wrote about Boyajian's art work:

Miss Boyajian's paintings cover a great deal of ground. They include portraits, landscapes, and decorative panels. These last are in two groups, the one illustrating the artist's own published versions of Gilgamesh, the Sumerian epic; the other, verses from the Rubaiyat of Omar Khayyam ... Harmony of color rather than of line or mass is her main preoccupation, and she achieves it without doing violence to nature's own color schemes.

(Qtd in A. A. Bedikian's "The Poet and Artist: A Profile of Zabelle Boyajian" Ararat Magazine Summer 1960)
