= Allon Barsam =

English ophthalmologist (born 1977)

- Born: May 5, 1977 (age 49); London, England
- Education: University of Cambridge, University College London Medical School
- Years active: 10
- Known for: Surgical innovations, Training in Ophthalmology co-author
- Medical career
- Profession: Ophthalmologist
- Field: Cataract Surgery
- Institutions: Moorfields Eye Hospital, London, Ophthalmic Consultants of Long Island, L&D University Hospital NHS Foundation Trust, UCL Partners, Ophthalmic Consultants of London
- Sub-specialties: Cornea, Cataract and Refractive Treatment of High Myopia
- Research: Keratoconus, Prevention of Iatrogenic Ectasia
- Awards: Alcon Prize for Poster, UK and Ireland Society of Cataract and Refractive Surgeons (UKISCRS) Annual Congress

Allon Barsam (born May 5, 1977) is a London-based ophthalmologist specializing in cataract surgery, refractive surgery and corneal and external eye disease. Barsam carried out the first human treatments of microwave keratoplasty.

== Education ==
Barsam attended Cambridge University and University College London Medical School, graduating with Honours and a Distinction in Surgery. After finishing his residency training at Moorfields Eye Hospital, he completed a yearlong fellowship at the Ophthalmic Consultants of Long Island in New York and worked closely with US experts in modern cornea and refractive surgery, Eric Donnenfeld and A. John Kanellopoulos, with whom he continued to work and perform research. Barsam followed this with an additional Cornea, Cataract and Refractive Surgery Fellowship at the Western Eye Hospital in London.

He has published over 30 peer review publications, 8 book chapters and a textbook of Ophthalmology.

== Career ==
Barsam is a member of the Microsurgical Skills Teaching Faculty with the Royal College of Ophthalmologists. He has been a clinical examiner and lecturer for City University, School of Optometry and holds an NHS Consultant post at Luton and Dunstable University Hospital as well as an Honorary Consultant post at the Western Eye Hospital.

A member of the Executive Board of the London Deanery, Barsam led a video-based instructional course in refractive anterior segment surgery as an instructor at the European and American Societies of Cataract and Refractive Surgery. He speaks, chairs and moderates research sessions internationally and co-authored the textbook Training in Ophthalmology ISBN 9780199237593.

Barsam also led a comprehensive review of research leading into the benefits of phakic intraocular lenses over laser surgery.

In 2012, Barsam was featured in a specially commissioned programme by the Discovery Channel where experts discuss their most challenging surgical cases.

In December 2018, Barsam along with consultant surgeons Ali Mearza and Romesh Angunawela co-founded Ophthalmic Consultant of London, a partnership of UK consultants specialising in laser and lens vision correction surgery.

The clinic based in New Cavendish Street opened in January 2019 offering some of the most technologically advanced treatments available.

== Operations ==
In 2010 Barsam led research into the success of implantable lenses versus laser eye surgery.

Barsam was the first British surgeon to use laser vision correction technology for cataract surgery with the use of intraoperative aberrometry.
