= Anushawan =

Character in Armenian mythology

In Armenian legendary history, Anushawan or Anushavan (Old Armenian: Անուշաւան, romanized: Anušawan) is the grandson of Ara the Handsome, the legendary king of Armenia.

Due to his divination from the sound of the leaves at the Armenian royal capital of Armavir, Anushawan was referred to as sawsanuēr 'devoted to the plane tree'. (Note: A variant of Movses Khorenatsi's history has or saws anuanēr 'who was called Saws' instead of sawsanuēr.) He was taken prisoner together with his father Kardos to Nineveh, but won over the hearts of the Assyrian courtiers with his wisdom and was allowed to return to reign in Armenia while paying tribute to Assyria.

Different views exist on the etymology of the name. It has been interpreted as a combination of anoyš 'immortal', an Armenian loanword from Middle Iranian, and possibly the Iranian suffix -van. Alternatively, it may be a corruption of the Iranian Anušarvan 'of immortal soul', possibly linked with the tale of the resurrection of Ara. As a male given name, Anushawan was revived among Armenians in the nineteenth century and is in use today in Armenia. Prior to the nineteenth century, it is not attested as a given name except in reference to the legendary figure.

== Sources ==
- Acharian, Hrachia (1942). "Anushawan". Hayotsʻ andznanunneri baṛaran [Dictionary of Armenian personal names] (in Armenian). Vol. 1. Yerevan: Petakan hamalsarani hratarakchʻutʻyun. p. 172.
- Moses Khorenatsʻi (1978). History of the Armenians. Translation and commentary by Robert W. Thomson. Cambridge, Massachusetts: Harvard University Press. ISBN 0-674-39571-9.
- Russell, J. R. (1985). "Anušawan". In Yarshater, Ehsan (ed.). Encyclopædia Iranica. Vol. II/2: Anthropology–ʿArab Moḥammad. London and New York: Routledge & Kegan Paul. p. 138. ISBN 978-0-71009-102-4.
