= Roman relations with the Armenians =

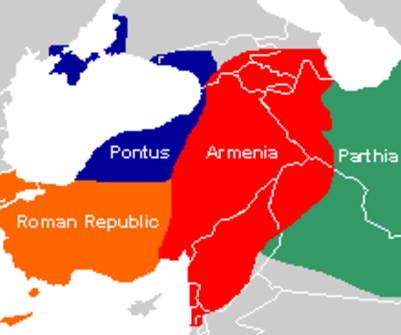
Armenian empire and Roman Republic map

Contacts between the Italian Peninsula and the Armenian Highland go back to the Iron Age when the Etruscan civilization traded with the Kingdom of Urartu by way of Phrygia and Ancient Greece. Urartian bronzes; bull-headed cauldrons and pottery were excavated in various parts of Etruscan Italy, particularly in Tuscany. The Roman Republic played a pivotal role in the re-establishment of the Kingdom of Armenia in 189 BC. Antiochus III the Great was defeated at the Battle of Magnesia by the Romans which in turn allowed the Armenian strategoi of Antiochus, Artaxias and Zariadres to take control of an independent Armenian Kingdom. The Romans perceiving themselves as the legitimate successors of the Seleucids began to play a more aggressive role in the affairs of the Hellenistic world of Asia Minor starting with the acquisition of Pergamum in 133 BC. The Third Mithridatic War (75– 65 BC ) led Roman forces for the first time directly to the Armenian border. From that point on until the demise of the Kingdom of Armenia in 428, Rome played a significant role in the affairs of Armenia and Armenians. This article explores the history of that relationship, a relationship which alternated between harmony and conflict.

== Relations during the Roman Republic ==
=== Lucius Licinius Lucullus ===
In 72 BC the Pontic king Mithridates VI Eupator abandoned his kingdom after his forces were defeated by the Romans in the Battle of Cabira. He fled eastward seeking protection at the court of his son-in-law Tigranes II the Great in Greater Armenia. The Roman general Lucius Licinius Lucullus sent his legate Appius Claudius to Armenia as an emissary. Tigranes received Appius in Antioch. Tigranes was given an ultimatum: surrender Mithridates or face an all out war with Rome. Tigranes denied the Romans their prize and in 69 BC Lucullus launched the first Roman invasion of Armenia. Tigranes had already faced the Romans in battle when he had attempted to annex Cappadocia and was driven back by Lucius Cornelius Sulla in 92 BC, this time he gathered a stronger army backed by Greek mercenaries. The combined forces of Tigranes and Mithridates were defeated at the Battle of Tigranocerta by the Romans and both monarchs fled to Northern Armenia near the Iberian border. Lucullus systematically dissolved the Armenian Empire of Tigranes and freed the enslaved regions that Tigranes had captured from the Parthians. Tigranes attempted to secure an alliance with Phraates III of Parthia but naturally Phraates declined the offer and assumed neutrality for the time being. Parthian reluctance to interfere gave Lucullus the confidence to move ahead and attack the second capital of Tigranes in 68 BC at Artaxata. Following the Battle of Artaxata, Lucullus failed to capture either one of the monarchs yet again. Frustrated because of the rough terrain of Northern Armenia, Lucullus moved back south and plundered Nisibis which was held by the brother of Tigranes. This allowed Mithridates to regroup by raising a small army and slaughtering all the Romans in Pontus (two whole legions at Zela alone under the command of Valerius Trianus), he then awaited Median reinforcements from Tigranes at the citadel of Talaura in Lesser Armenia. Hearing news of this bloodbath, Lucullus ordered his troops to Lesser Armenia but the troops refused and instead agreed to move west and assume a defensive position in Galatia. Pontus and Armenia were now once again under the full control of Mithridates and Tigranes. The Roman Senate, greatly embarrassed by the outcome, voted to recall Lucullus.

== See also ==
- Roman Armenia
