= Aravan (legendary) =

- Monarch

Aravan (c. 483 BC) was a legendary ruler of Armenia, mentioned in the 5th century AD History of Armenia. He was the youngest son of Vahagn, and ruled for 18 years.
