= Vahe =

Armenian king

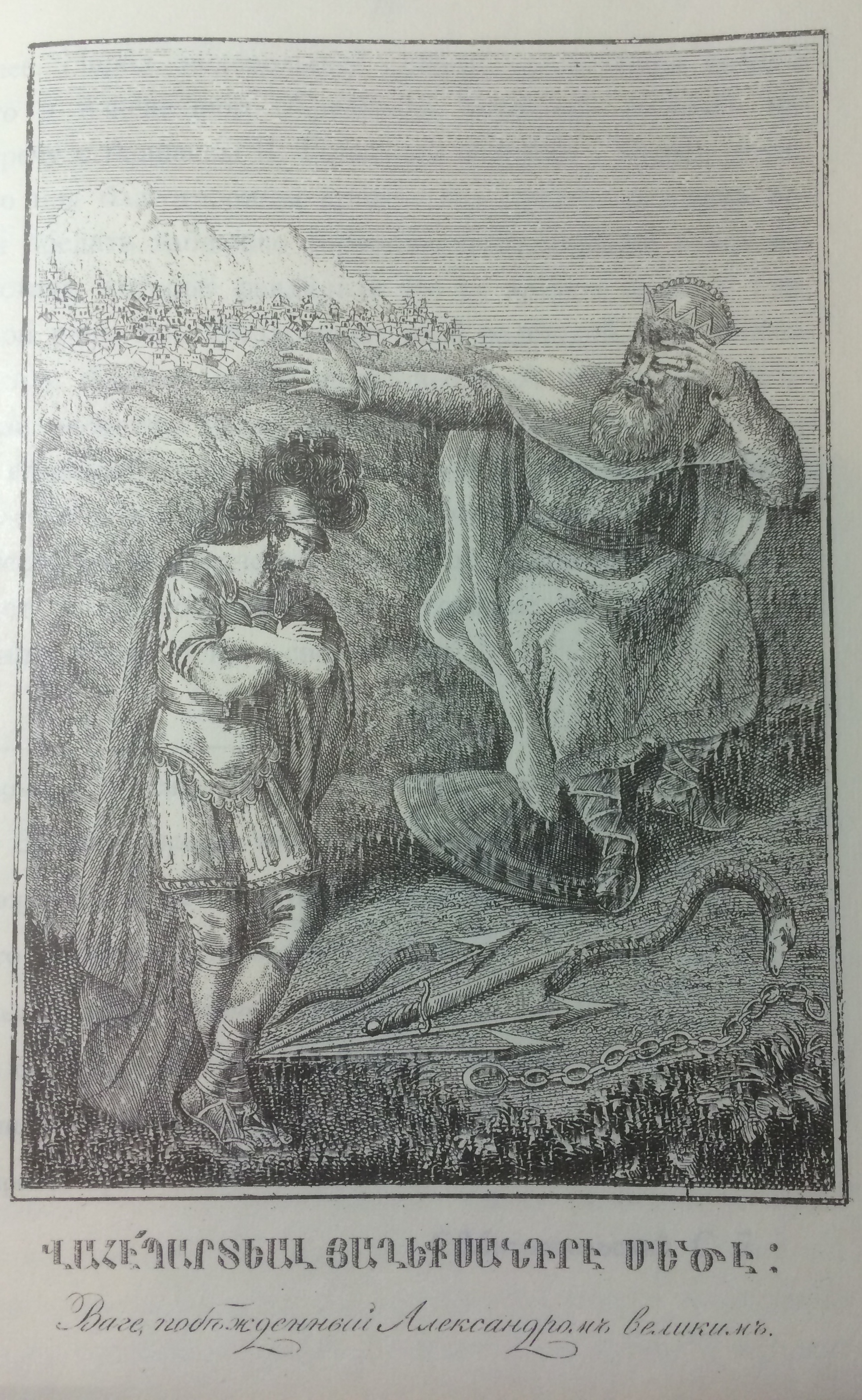
A 19th-century depiction of Vahe and Alexander the Great

Vahe (Armenian: Վահէ), according to the traditional Armenian history recorded by Movses Khorenatsi, was the last king of Armenia descended from the legendary Armenian progenitor Hayk. Khorenatsi writes that Vahe rebelled against Alexander the Great and was killed. L. Shaninyan believes that this reflects the presence of Armenians among the Persian forces at the battles of Issus and Gaugamela, identifying Vahe with Mithraustes, who Arrian says was the Armenian commander at Gaugamela.

== See also ==
- List of Armenian Kings
