= Tir (god) =

Armenian god of writing and arts

- God of schooling, rhetoric, wisdom and the arts
- Mount: Tirinkatar

Equivalents
- Greek: Hermes
- Roman: Mercury

Tir (Armenian: Տիր) is the god of written language, schooling, rhetoric, wisdom, and the arts in Armenian mythology.

He was considered to be the scribe and messenger of the chief god Aramazd, as well as a fortune teller and interpreter of dreams, who recorded the good and bad deeds of men and also a psychopomp (guide of souls to the underworld). He was likely connected with Grogh (literally "Writer"), the angel of fate and death in Armenian folk tradition identified with the Archangel Gabriel.

Tir's temple, called Erazamoyn (eraz means "dream," while the meaning of the ending -moyn is unknown), was located near the city of Artashat. The fourth month of the ancient Armenian calendar, Trē or Tri, was named after Tir. Also named after him was the mountain Tirinkatar, the city Tirakatar, the villages Tre and Tirarich. In the Hellenistic period, Armenians identified Tir with the Greek gods Apollo and Hermes.

Tir shares his name with an Iranian god (Avestan Tishtrya, Modern and Middle Persian Tir) also identified with the planet Mercury, but may be an indigenous Armenian deity identified with the Iranian Tir at a later period. Tir (both the Iranian and Armenian versions) may be identical with the Mesopotamian god of literacy and scribes Nabu (also identified with Mercury).

== See also ==
- Armenian mythology
- Tishtrya
- Tir (month)
- Týr

== Bibliography ==
- Ananikian, Mardiros H. (1925). "Armenian Mythology". In MacCulloch, John Arnott; Moore, George Foot (eds.). The Mythology of All Races (in 13 vols.); volume 7. Boston: Marshall Jones Company.
- Herouni, Paris (2004). Armenians and Old Armenia. Yerevan. pp. 8, 133. ISBN 9789994101016.
- Petrosyan, Armen (2007). "State Pantheon of Greater Armenia: Earliest Sources". Aramazd: Armenian Journal of Near Eastern Studies. 2: 174–201. ISSN 1829-1376.
- Petrosyan, Armen (2002), The Indo‑european and Ancient Near Eastern Sources of the Armenian Epic, Washington, D.C: Institute for the Study of Man, ISBN 9780941694810
- Russell, James R. (15 December 1986). "ARMENIA AND IRAN iii. Armenian Religion". Encyclopædia Iranica.
- "Tir". Soviet Armenian Encyclopedia (in Armenian). Vol. 12. 1986. pp. 15–16.
