= Barsamin =

Barsamin (Բարսամին, Barshamin Բարշամին) was a weather or sky god among the Armenians. He is probably derived from the Semitic god Baal Shamin.
