= Urartian religion =

Belief system adopted in the ancient state of Urartu

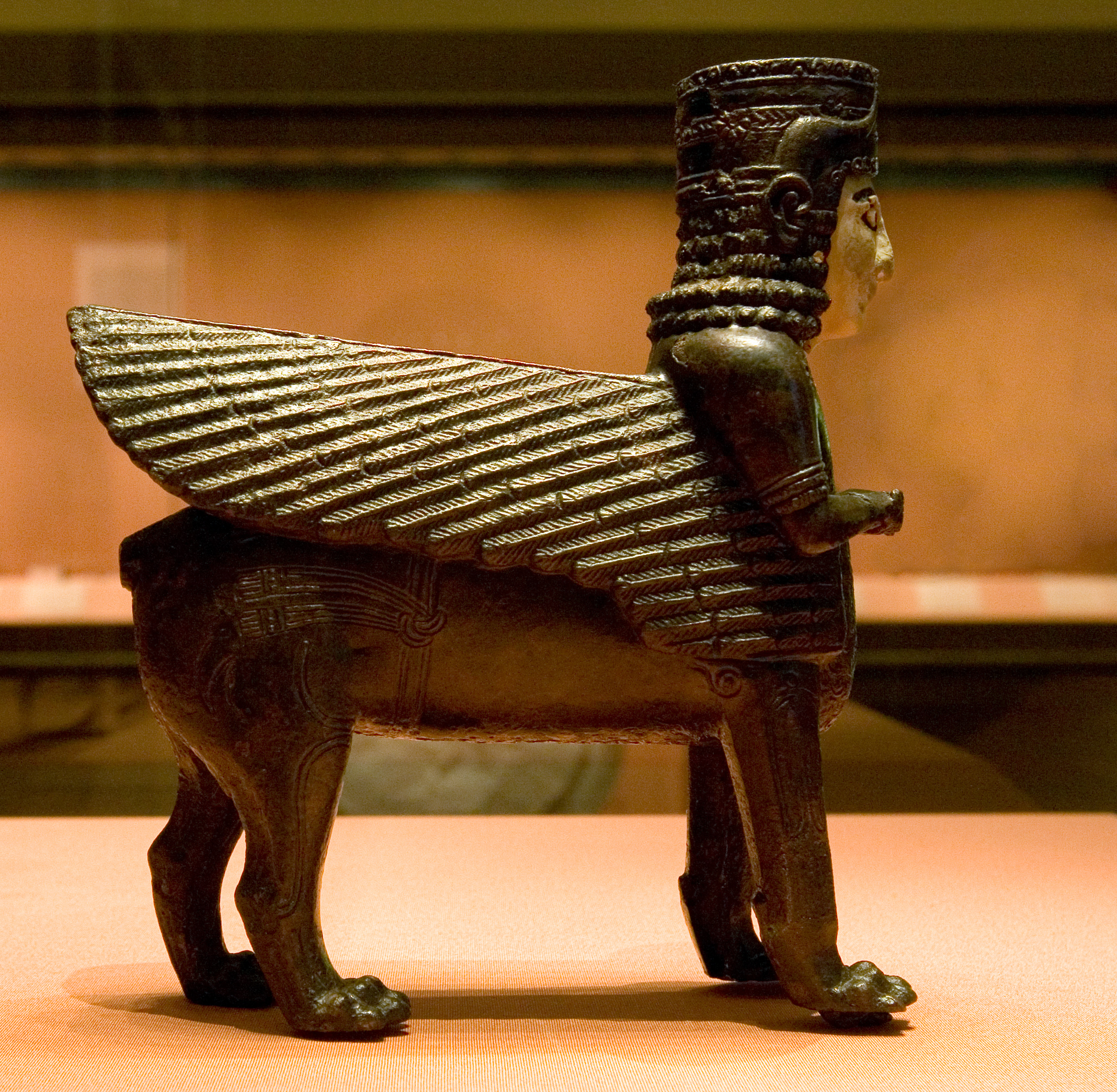
Urartian deity. The bronze sculpture was discovered on Toprakkale hill, and is kept in the Hermitage Museum

Urartian religion is a belief system adopted in Urartu, an ancient state centered around the Armenian highlands that existed from the 8th to the 6th century BC. The Urartian religion was polytheistic in nature and derived from the earlier beliefs of Mesopotamia and Anatolia. As in other beliefs of the ancient Near East, Urartu had a pantheon of deities, patronizing various phenomena. The main deity was Haldi. The worlds of humans and gods were united through ritual sacrifices. The Urartian religion absorbed the motifs of the tree of life, the serpent and the winged solar disk characteristic of the ancient Near East. Against the background of Mesopotamian beliefs, Urartu was distinguished by a high level of religious tolerance, which was conditioned by the multinationality of the state.

== Sources ==
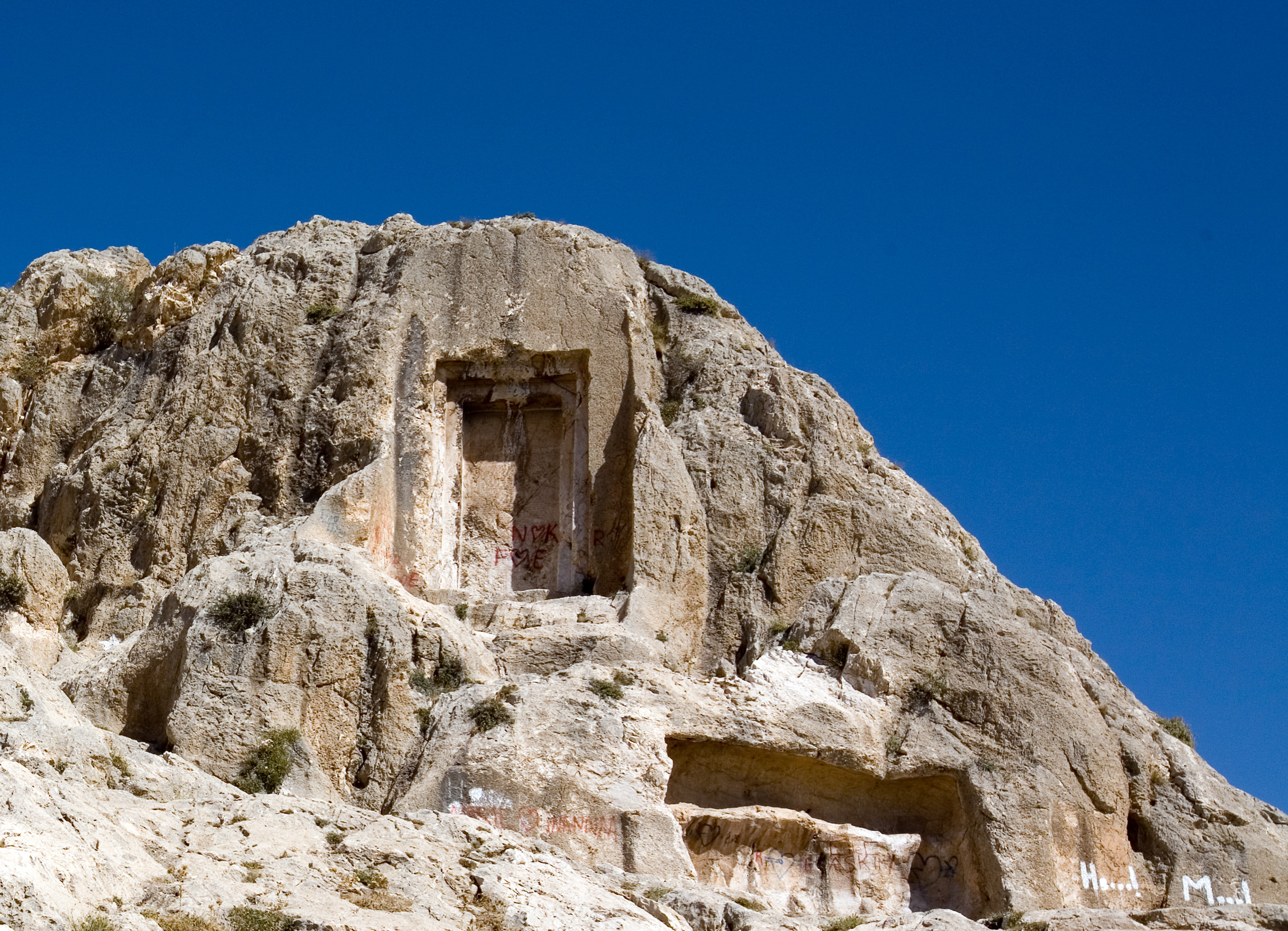
"God's gate", formerly called "Mher's gate".

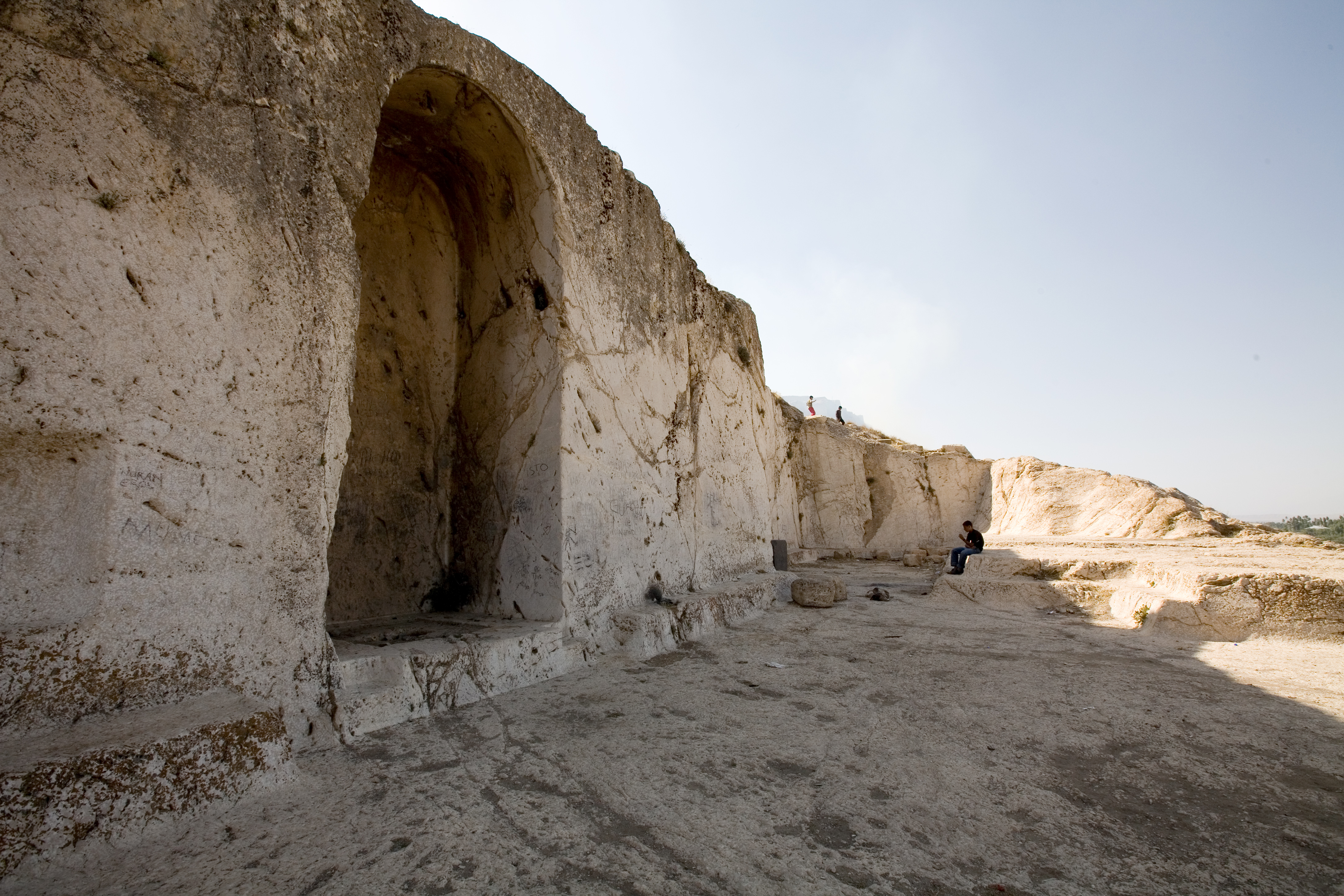
The plaza in Tushpa where the offerings were made

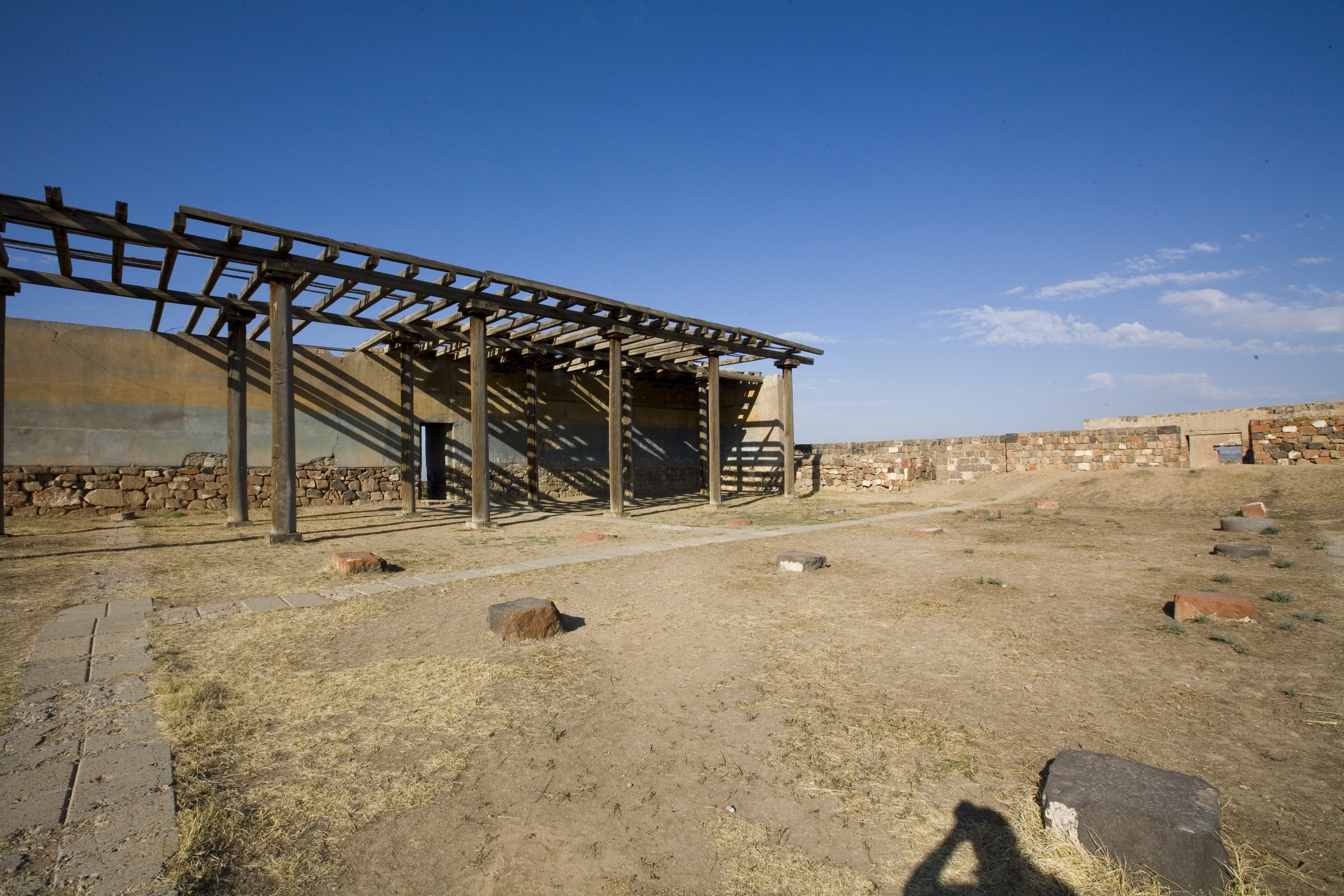
Reconstructed wall of Haldi's temple in Erebuni with frescoes and peristyle

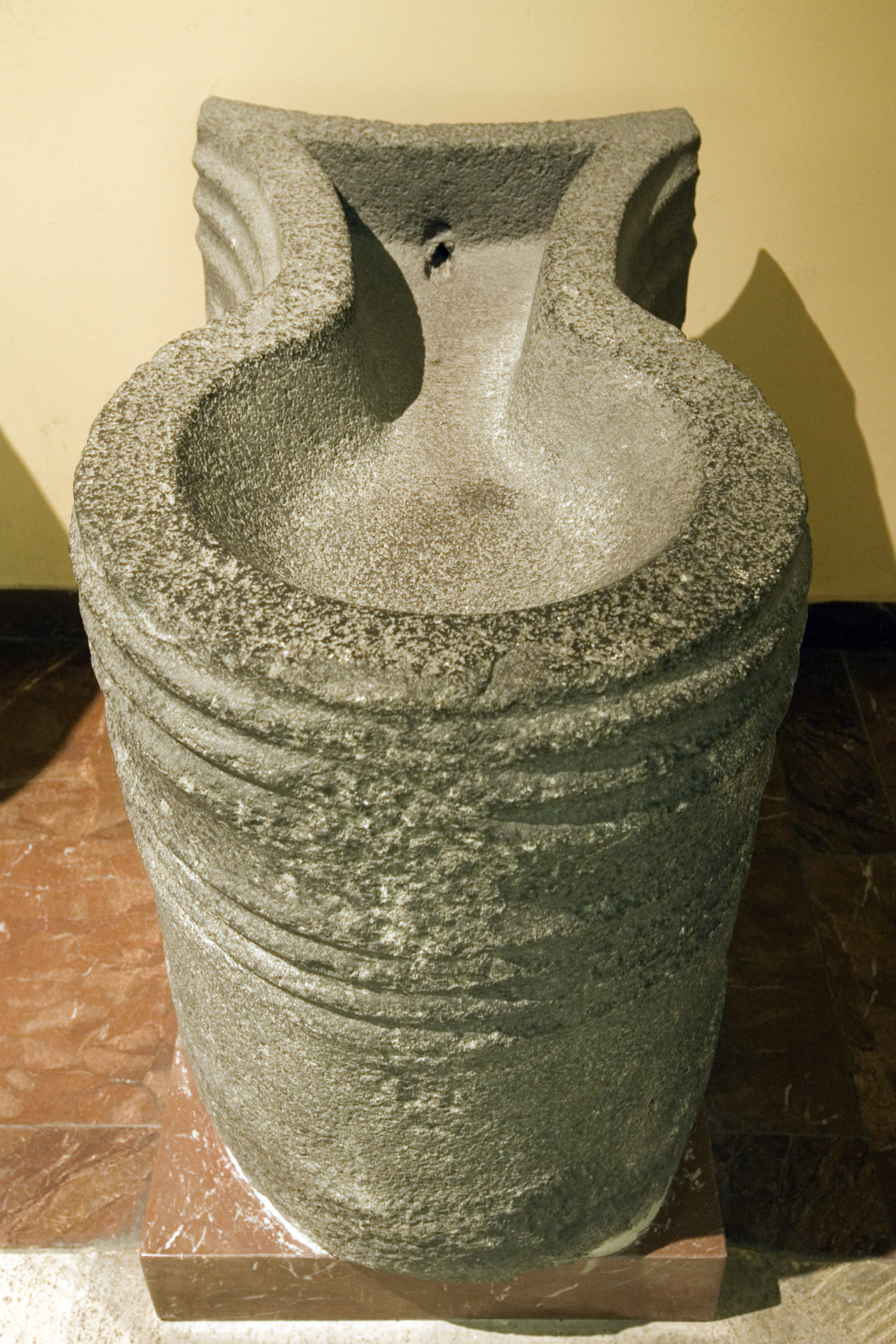
An altar from Haldi's temple in Rusahinili, which is kept in Istanbul Archaeology Museums

Sources for the study of the Urartian religion are scarce. Scholars have a limited number of documents that describe the rituals and belief system of the Urartians. A unique written source is a text, written during the reign of King Ishpuini and carved on a rock near Toprakkale. The text was placed at the "god's gate", known in modern times as the "Mher's gate". The gate is a rectangular, shallow, triple-framed depression in the rock. According to ancient Eastern beliefs, these three levels symbolized triple doors through which deities could emerge from the depths of the rock.

The text at the gate was discovered in 1916 by Joseph Orbeli during the work of a Russian archaeological expedition. The inscription turned out to be a list of all Urartian deities. During excavations in Ajanis, where the fortress from the time of Rusa II was discovered, a document was found with a description of the sacrificial ritual for the deity Haldi. Researchers also have copies containing references to Haldi: "By the name of the god Haldi, I, king of Urartu, have built this granary...". Such formulas are contained in some written sources and in the few surviving objects of material culture with images of deities or depictions of religious rituals. No mythological texts, prayers or magical incantations have been discovered so far.

Urartian religious practices were similar to Assyrian and Hittite ones. This circumstance makes it easier for researchers to understand some of the symbols of Urartian beliefs.

== History ==
Elements of ancient Eastern religion probably reached the Armenian Highlands before the rise of the Urartu state. At the end of the second millennium BC, the Urartians migrated from across the Revanduz river in the Western Azerbaijan Province of Iran toward the west. The Mesopotamian belief system they adopted became the nucleus of the Urartian religion. The beliefs of the Hurrians, who settled in the Armenian Highlands after the fall of Mitanni, are also believed to have originated in the Mesopotamian region. According to the theory of Boris Piotrovsky, the religions of the Urartians and the Hurrians intermingled. Igor M. Diakonoff, on the other hand, only pointed out the similarities of the two deities: Theispas and Teshub. According to him, the pantheons of the two peoples' deities were different, even though the two nations were related. The beliefs of the Urartians were influenced – through the Hurrians – by those of the Hittites, whose pantheon shared elements with Mesopotamian religions. From this mixture of Near Eastern beliefs emerged the religion and pantheon of Urartian deities.

The rise and development of Urartian statehood became the main reason for the creation of a canon of religious beliefs. Similarly, the evolution of beliefs took place in the despotic states of the ancient East. State religion was, in the hands of the ruler, an additional tool for controlling subjects. The process of crystallization of Urartu's belief system ended during the reign of Ishpuini, who annexed Musasir, a center of Haldi worship, to the state. This city was located east of Lake Van. From there the Urartian expansion to the West began. Under Ishpuini, Urartian writing began to add the formula "In the name of the god Haldi..." to the king's name.

During the Ishpuini period, a complete list of Urartian deities was engraved at the "Mher's gate" with information on the number of animals sacrificed to them. During the reigns of Menua, Argishti I, Sarduri II and Rusa I, that is, during the heyday of the state, numerous temples were erected in Urartu, most of which were dedicated to Haldi. Religious ceremonies and ritual sacrifices were regularly held in many Urartian cities.

In 714 BC, the Urartian army suffered defeat at the hands of the Assyrians under the command of Sargon II. Rusa I hid behind the walls of Tushpa, and Sargon II made a maneuver that resulted in the capture and demolition of Musasir. The main temple of Haldi was looted and the statue of the deity was taken to Assyria. The year 714 BC proved to be a turning point for both Urartu statehood and its religion. Although the deity's statue was successfully redeemed, Haldi's former position was not restored. During the reign of Rusa II, when Urartu briefly regained its former power, the superiority of Haldi over other deities was not given when new temples were erected. In the last period of the weakened Urartu's existence, prayers and offerings were often made to Theispas, Assyrian Ashur and Babylonian Marduk. Presumably, the relocation of the capital to Teishebaini was religiously and, additionally, politically motivated. Teishebaini was the center of the worship of Theispas, in whom hopes for the rebirth of the state were placed.

== Mythology ==
=== Pantheon ===
The structure of the pantheon of Urartian deities shared features with Mesopotamian religion, partly mediated by Assyria and partly by the Hurrians. Only the main deity Haldi remained Urartian. In Urartian scripture, the names of Theispas and Shivini were written using Assyrian ideograms, which in Assyria corresponded to Hadad and Shamash. Haldi's name, on the other hand, had phonetic notation. Known religious rituals, including the offering of sacrifices, were also of Mesopotamian origin.

The Urartian deities were anthropomorphic, but retained some zoomorphic elements: the most common animal attributes included horns and wings. A separate place in the pantheon of Urartian deities was occupied by Haldi's hypostases. Some deities were totemic in nature, for example, gods of mountains, trails and caves. Male deities occupied a higher position in the pantheon than female ones. In Ishpuini's inventory, male deities were listed in the first 63 positions out of 79.

Some Urartu scholars have propounded the view that each Urartian deity belongs to particular peaks in the Armenian Highlands.

==== Royal cult ====
The main gods of the Urartian pantheon included Haldi, Theispas and Shivini, along with their spouses – Arubani, Huba and Tushpuea, respectively. Urartian kings invoked these three deities during their descriptions of successful war expeditions; for example, Argishti I placed a prayer in the fourth column of the Horhor vintage engraved on the Van Rock in Tushpua:

"...On the third day, I gathered the warriors and raised prayers to Haldi, the ruler, to the god Theispas, to the god Shivini, to all the gods of the land of Biainila for what I wished to accomplish for the glory of the Lord; the gods heard my request. I made a march on the land of Urme, I conquered the land of Urme..."

Asking for help in battles was probably the most important aspect in the relationship between rulers and gods. According to beliefs, Haldi was the main force that contributed to victory. Sacred fire was connected with Haldi, his temples were called "house of weapons" and "house of shield". Another form of honoring the main deities was a formula, ending inscriptions on stelas and rocks:

"[If] someone destroys this inscription, [or] someone breaks it, [or] someone forces anyone to do such acts, ... [then] let [them] be destroyed by the gods Haldi, Theispas, Shivini, all their gods under the sun."

Main deities

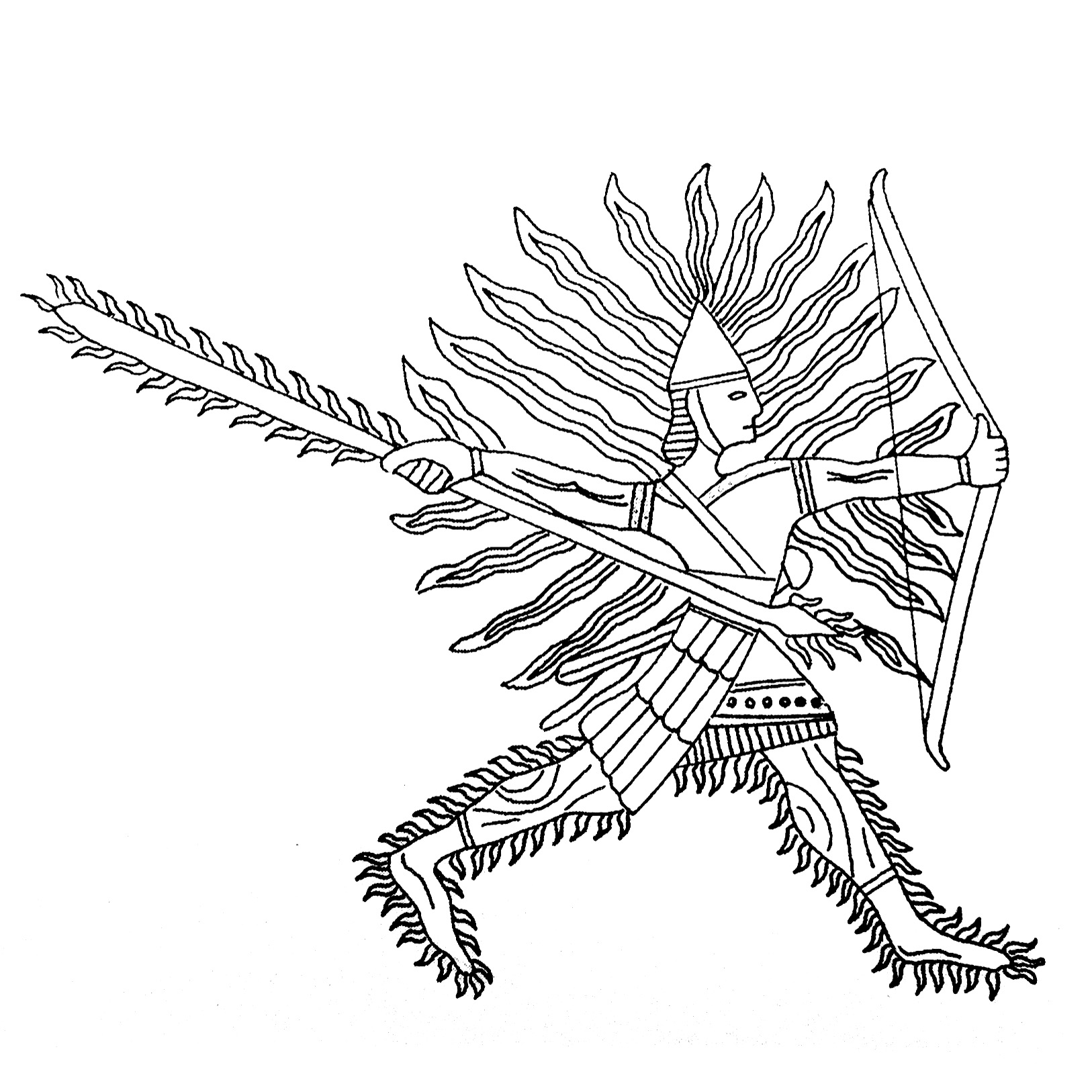
Haldi armed with fire

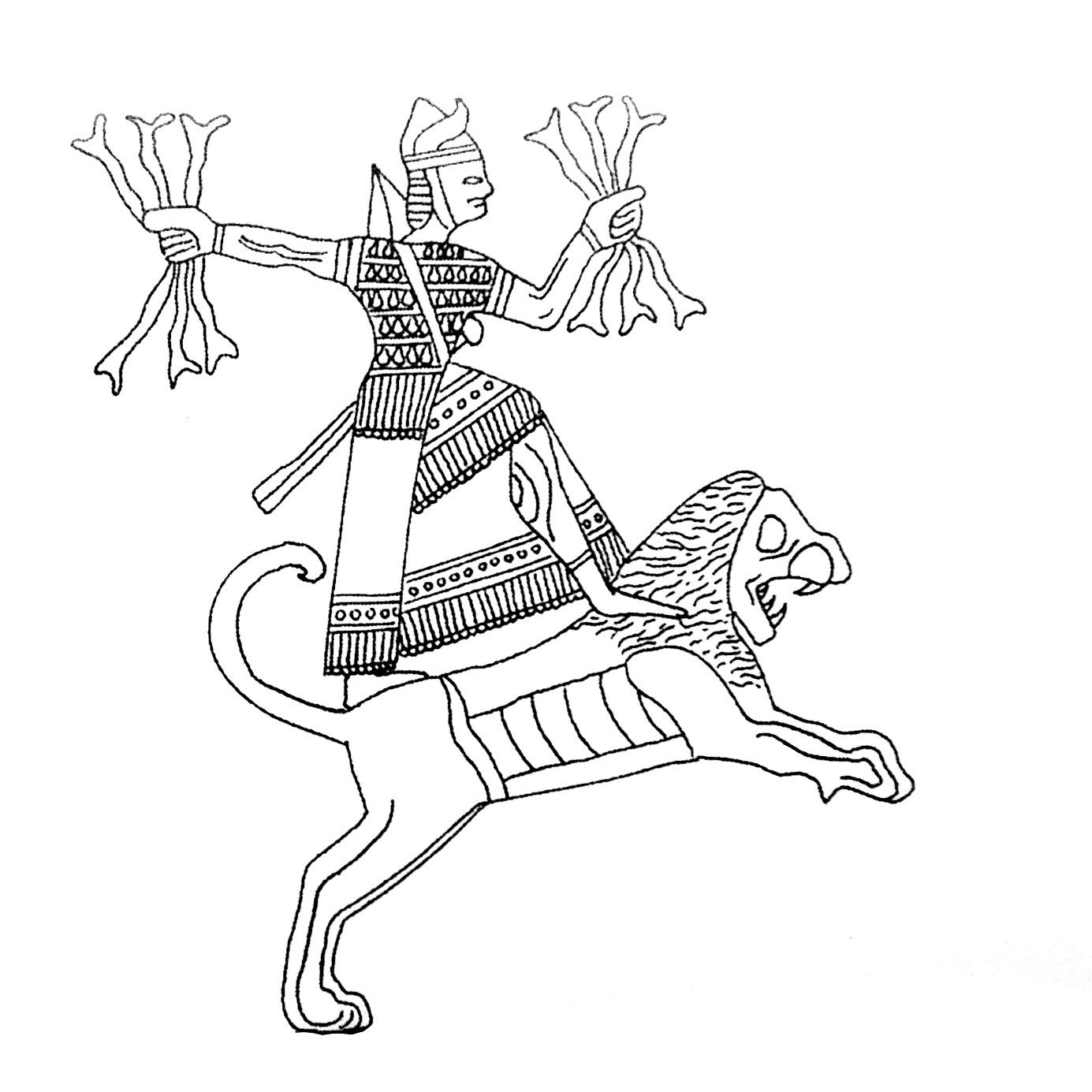
Theispas on a lion

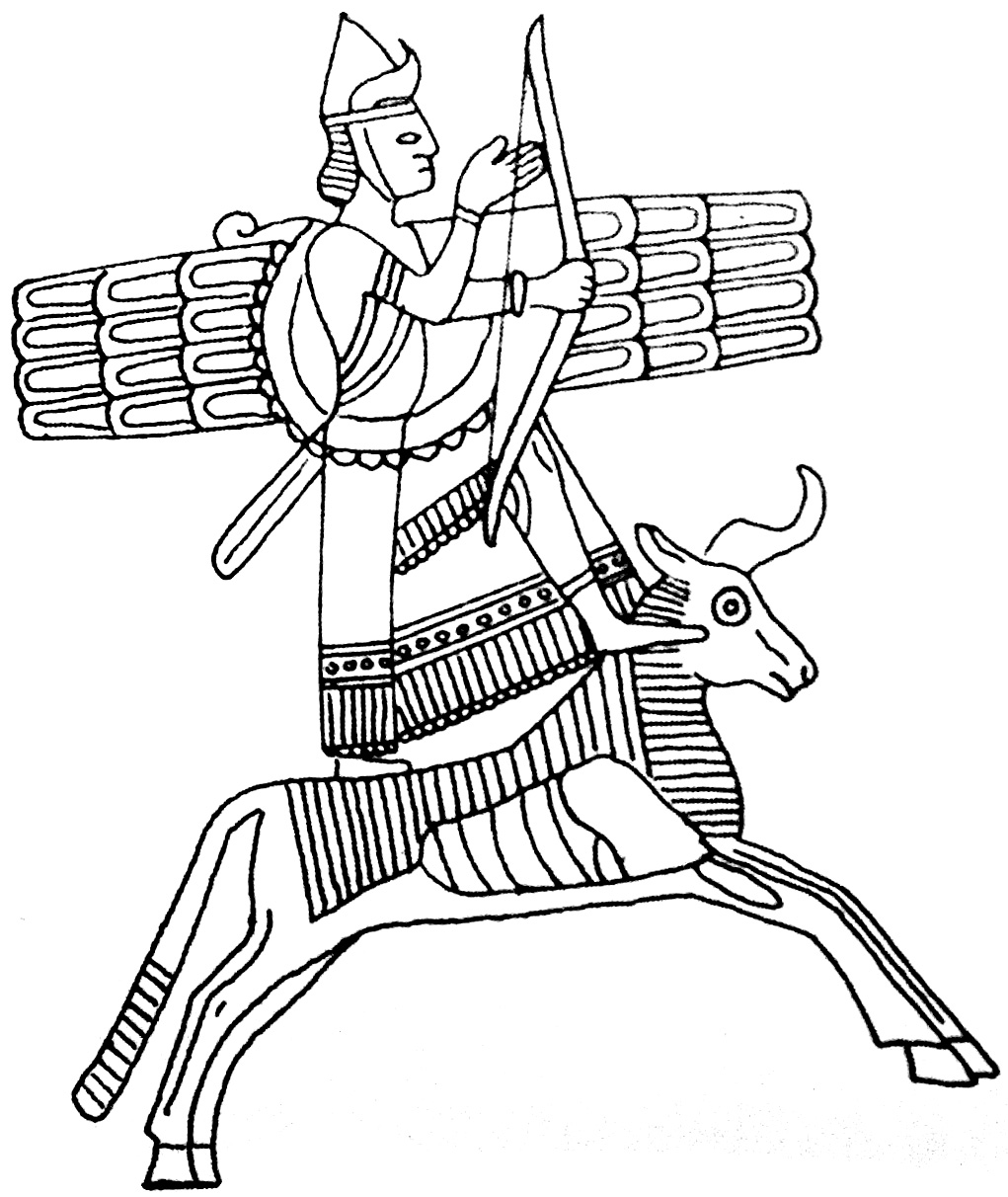
Shivini on a bull

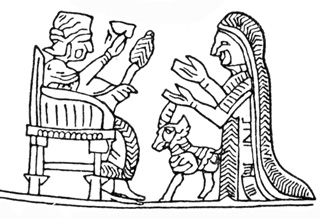
Haldi's spouse – Arubani

===== Haldi =====
Haldi was the main deity of the Urartian pantheon. Originally an obscure Akkadian deity, Haldi worship was introduced during the reign of Ishpuini. The etymology of his name remains unclear, although both Hurrian and Indo-European etymologies have been proposed.

===== Theispas =====
Theispas occupied the second place in the hierarchy of the pantheon of Urartian deities, after Haldi. His symbol was a bull; sometimes he was depicted riding a lion. Theispas had much in common with the Assyrian god Hadad. In Urartian cuneiform, the god's name was written using an Assyrian ideogram. Both the name and attributes of Teisheba also allude to the Hurrian Teshub. There is a hypothesis that Theispas was borrowed by the Urartians from Mesopotamia via the Hittites. The city of Teishebaini, located on the Karmir Blur hill, was named after Theispas.

===== Shivini =====
Shivini (or Suini) was the third main deity of Urartu. His attribute was a winged shield. Shivini corresponded to the Assyrian Shamash; in the Urartian cuneiform, his name was written with an Assyrian ideogram. The Urartian capital of Tushpa was probably the center of Shivini's cult. This god was originally borrowed from the Hittites.

==== Other deities ====
The Urartu pantheon also included female deities led by the wives of the main gods – Arubani, Huba and Tushpuea. In addition, the more prominent gods included: Shelardi, a lunar deity who corresponded to the Mesopotamian Sin, and Tsinuardi, who shared characteristics with Ishtar. The deities in Ishpuini's list were grouped by gender, and since male deities were placed at the beginning of the list, this allowed researchers to determine the gender of Shebiti, who was initially tried to be identified with the Babylonian goddess Sabitu. The list of Urartian deities also includes totemic deities and numerous hypostases of Haldi.

=== Motifs ===
Urartian writing contains almost no mention of Urartian mythology. Some mythological figures are depicted on objects of material culture. These include images of the tree of life, a snake, a griffin and a winged shield. Similar mythological elements were present in Urartu's neighboring countries, so scholars assume that the religious rituals associated with them were similar.

==== Themes of the tree of life and the snake ====
Images of the tree of life appear on seals discovered in Tushpa. They depict figures bowing to the tree. On some of the seals, people hold vessels with water. The tree of life also appeared together with astral symbols – the moon and stars. The tree motif, used as an ornament, was also a popular subject of wall paintings.

==== Griffins and angels ====
Urartian monuments of material culture with images of figures with wings have been preserved. Researchers assume that the appearance of such creatures is related to the process of anthropomorphization of Urartian deities. The appearance of winged figures in Urartian mythology was the result of the gradual transformation of Stone Age zoomorphic deities into anthropomorphic ones. At the stage of transformation, deities were given zoomorphic features, such as the addition of wings or an accompanying animal-symbol.

==== Winged shield ====
The motif of the winged shield was widespread in the civilizations of Ancient Egypt, Mesopotamia and the Hittite state. The shield was a symbol of the solar deity Shivini. The Urartian symbol did not contain the details found on Mesopotamian and Egyptian shields. The style of the Urartian shield was similar to the Hittite one. The rituals in which it was used resembled Assyrian worship.

Themes of the tree of life and the snake

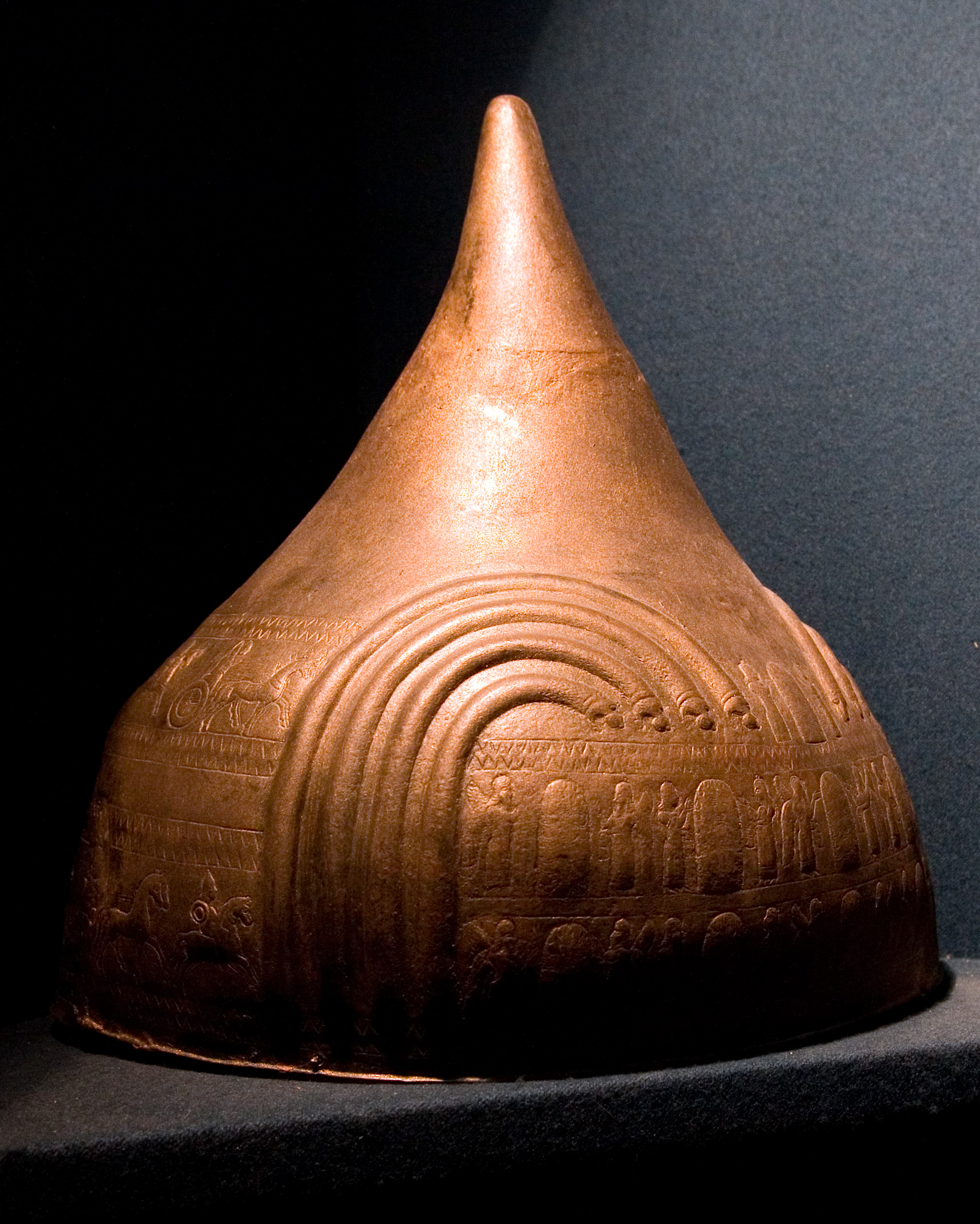
Snakes leaning over the tree of life on the helmet of Sarduri II from Karmir Blur (History Museum of Armenia)

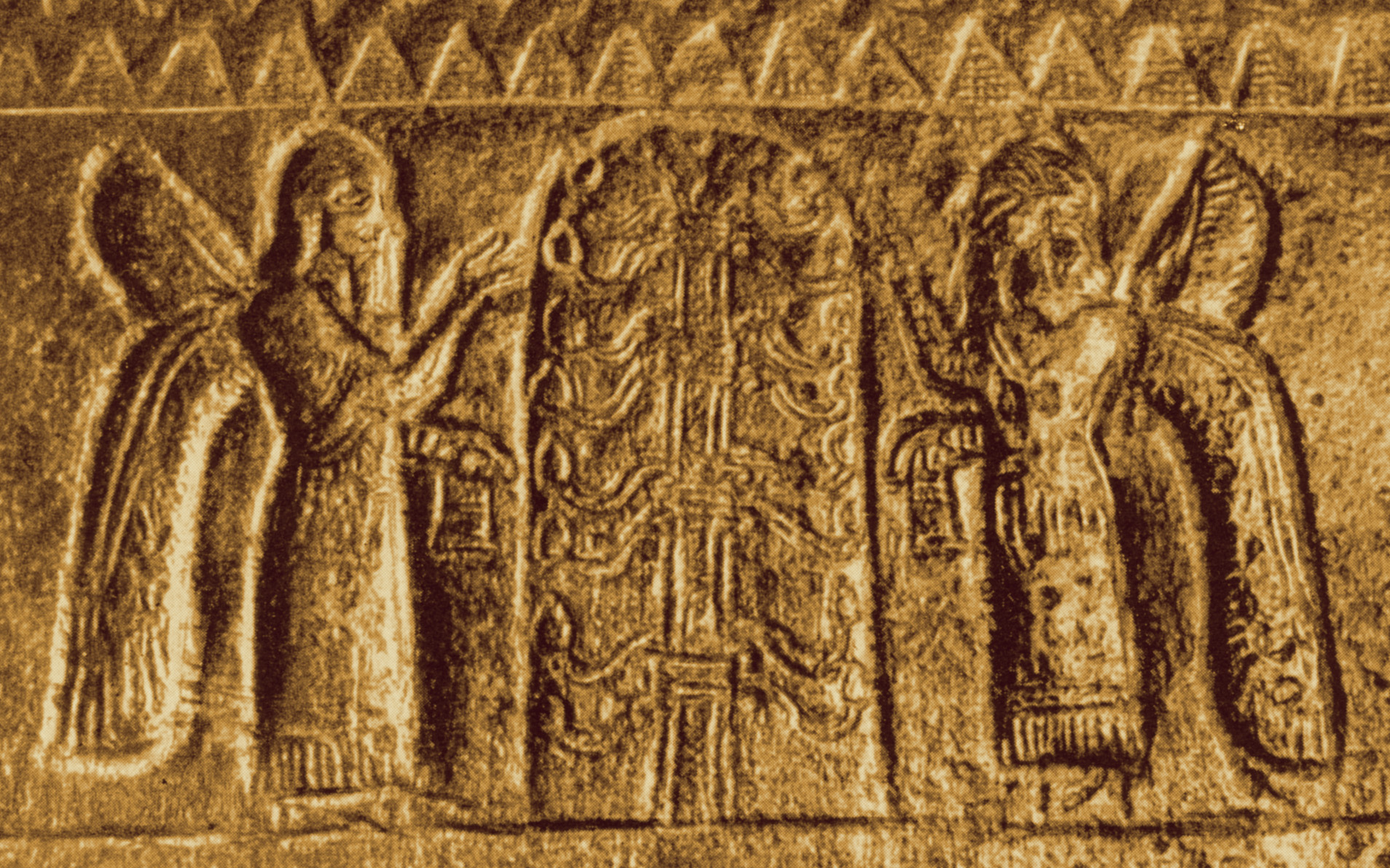
Fragment of Sarduri II's helmet with tree of life motif and winged figures on both sides

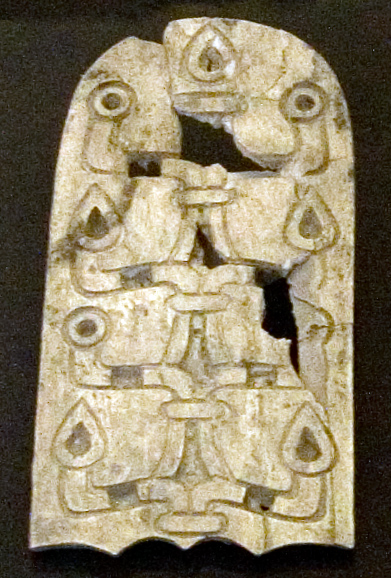
Typical of Urartu art tree of life – ivory carving from Toprakkale (Museum of Anatolian Civilizations)

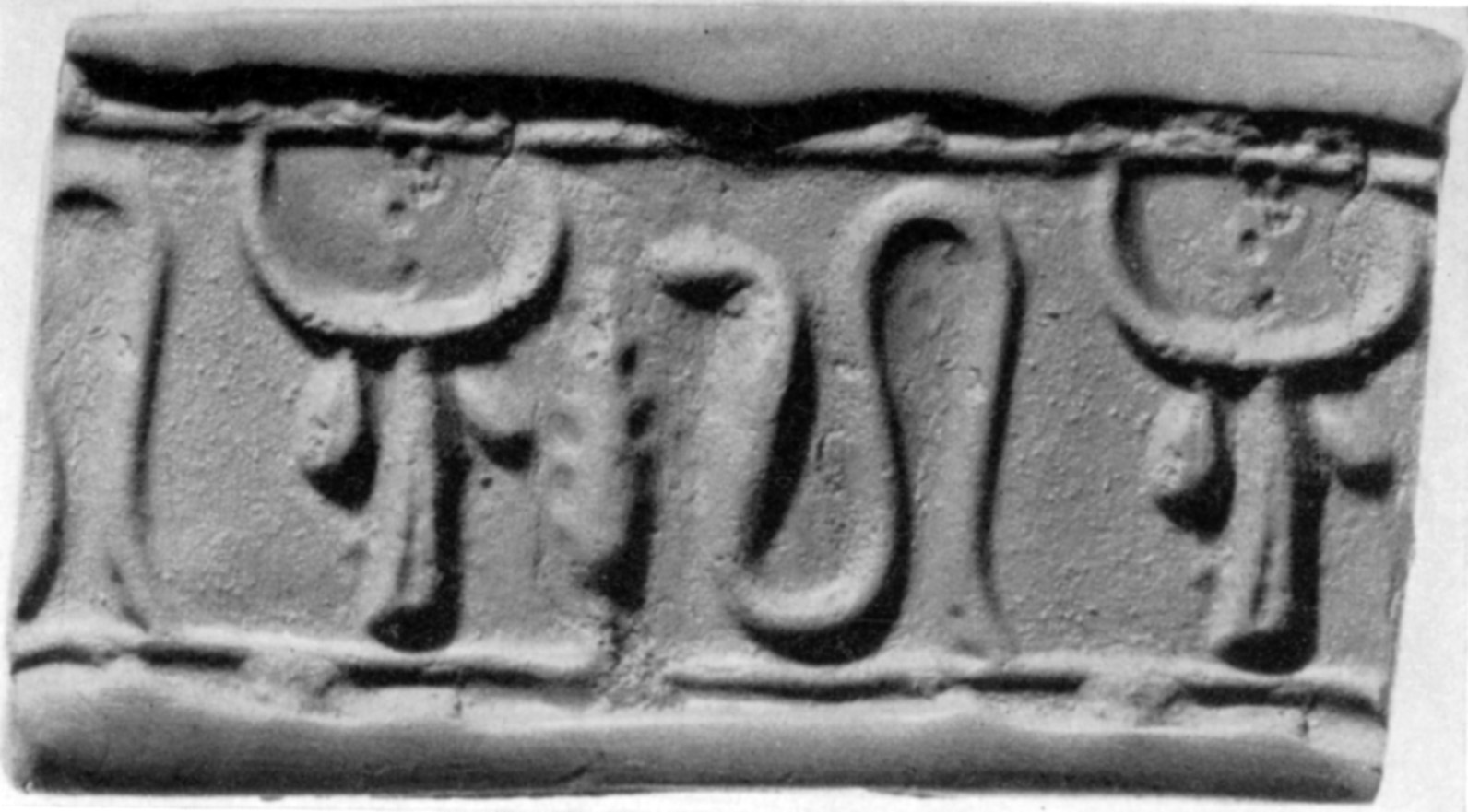
Imprint of a cylindrical seal with an image of a snake found on Karmir Blur (History Museum of Armenia)

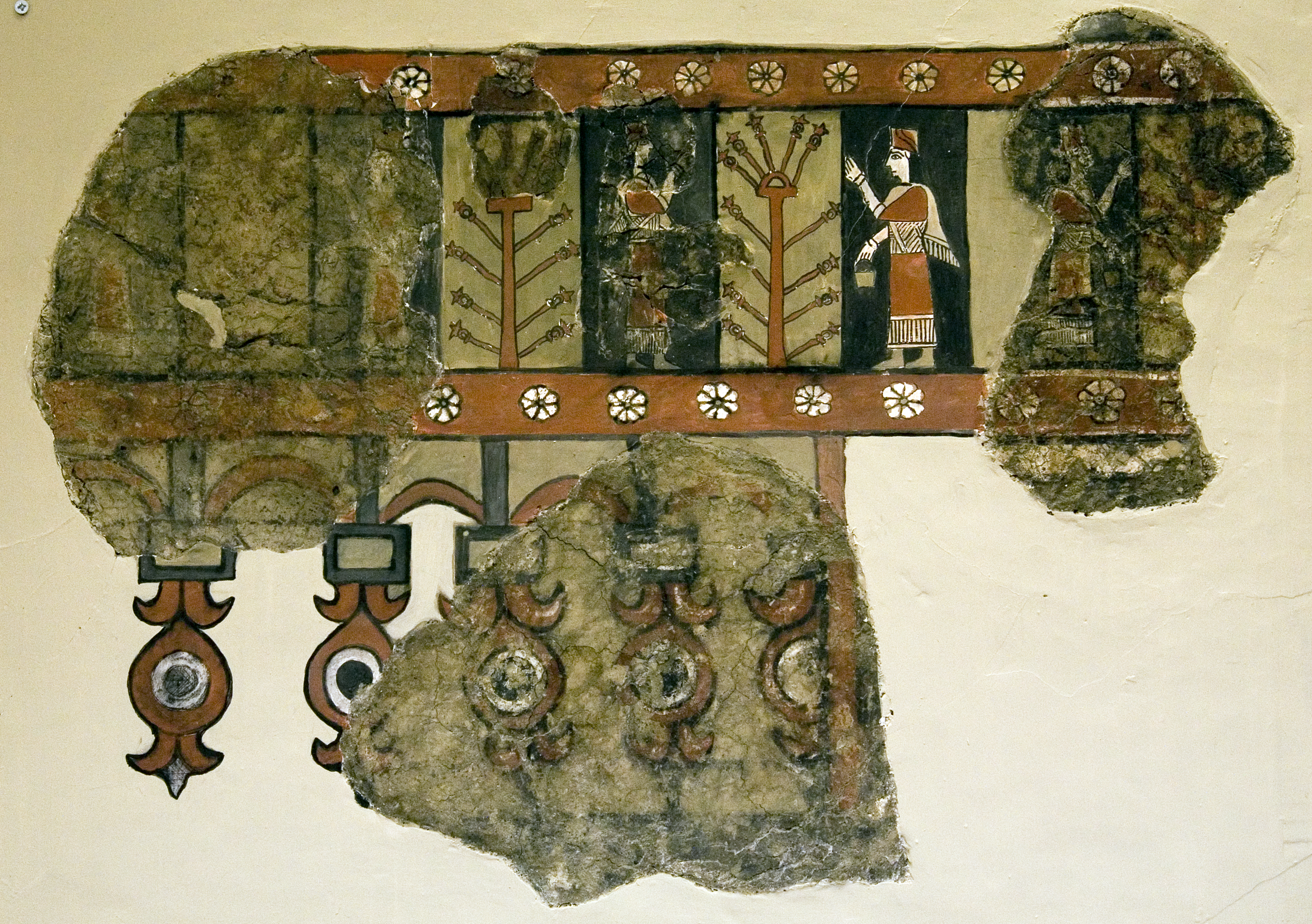
Fragment of a fresco with the scene of adoration of the tree of life (Museum of Anatolian Civilizations)
Winged shield

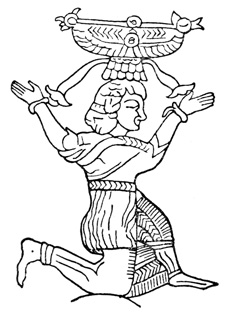
Image of Shivini from the bronze belt from Karmir Blur (History Museum of Armenia)

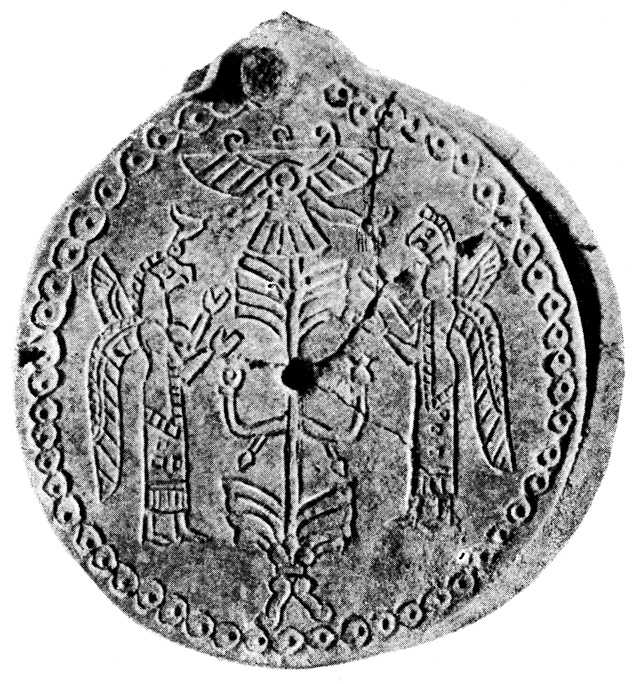
The lid of a stone casket. The winged shield co-exists with the motif of bowing to a tree

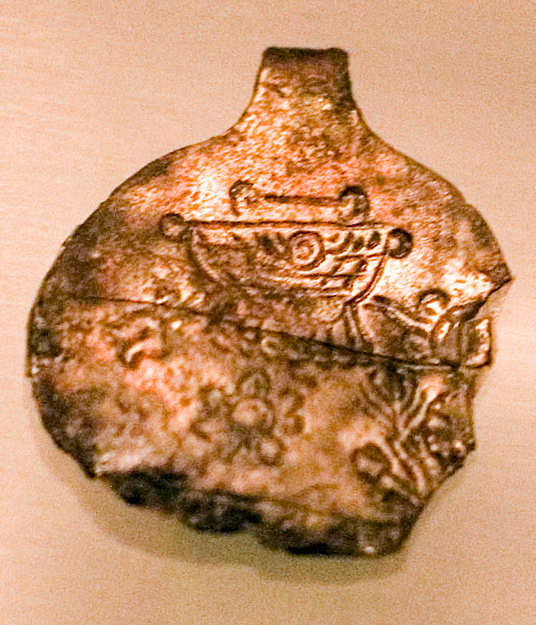
Silver medallion from Karmir Blur from the period of the fall of Urartu (History Museum of Armenia)
Winged figures

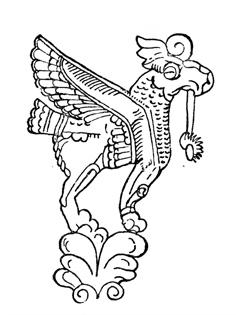
Bronze belt griffin from Karmir Blur (History Museum of Armenia)

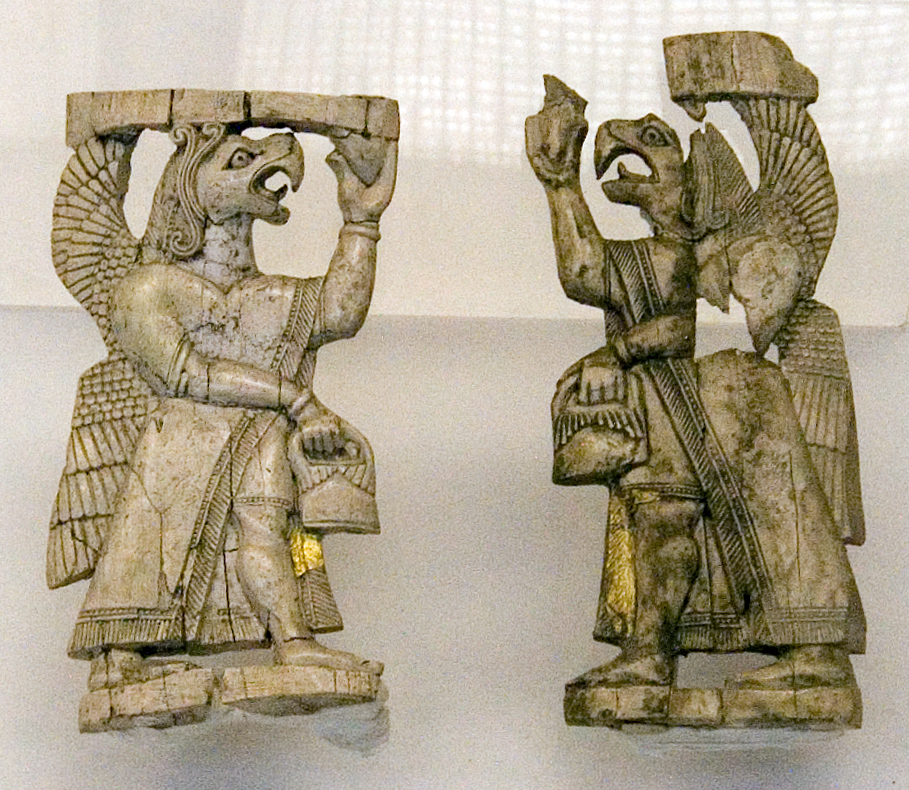
Ivory sculptures from Toprakkale (Museum of Anatolian Civilizations)

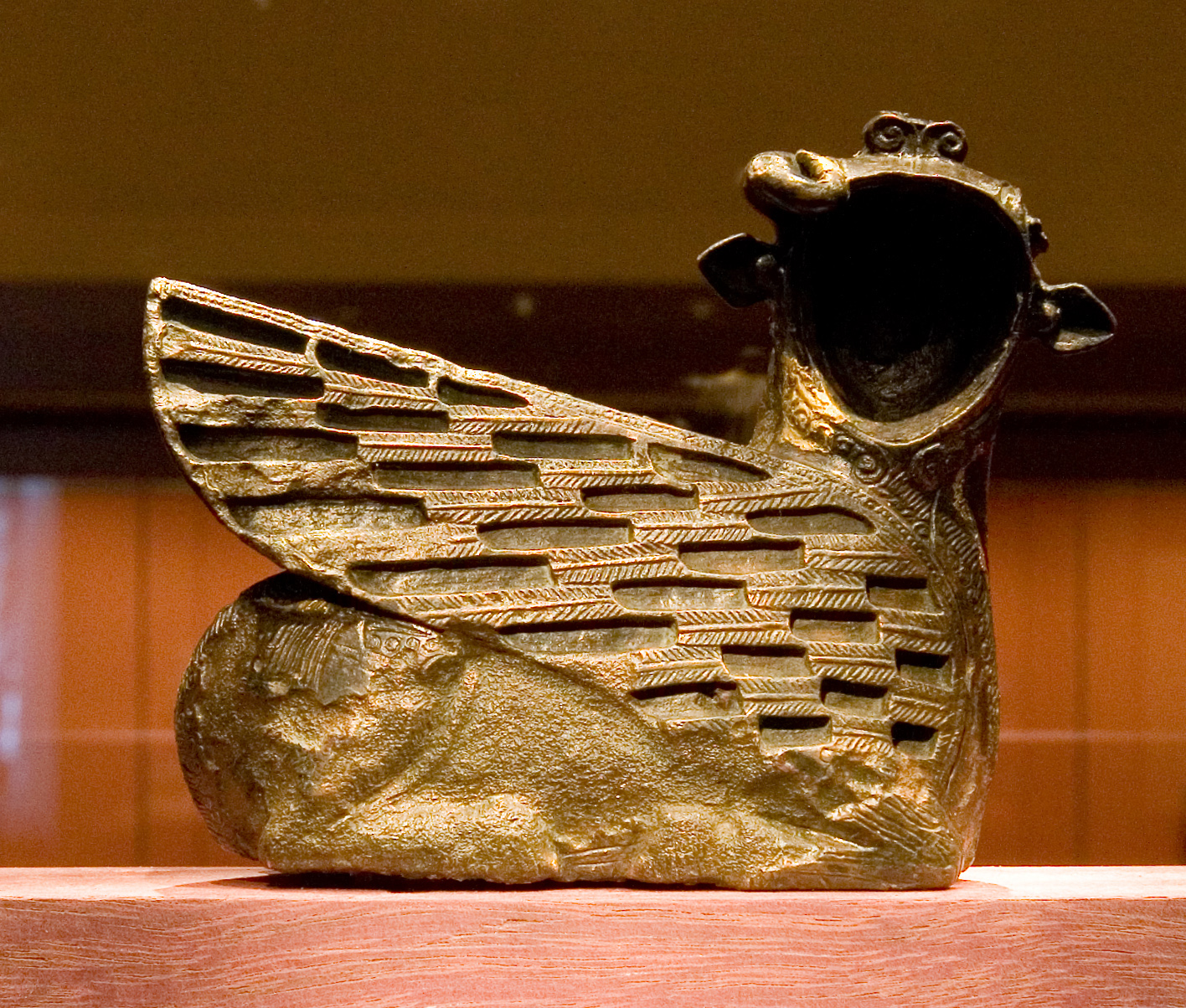
Sculpture of a winged deity that adorned the throne at Toprakkale (Hermitage Museum)

== Rituals ==
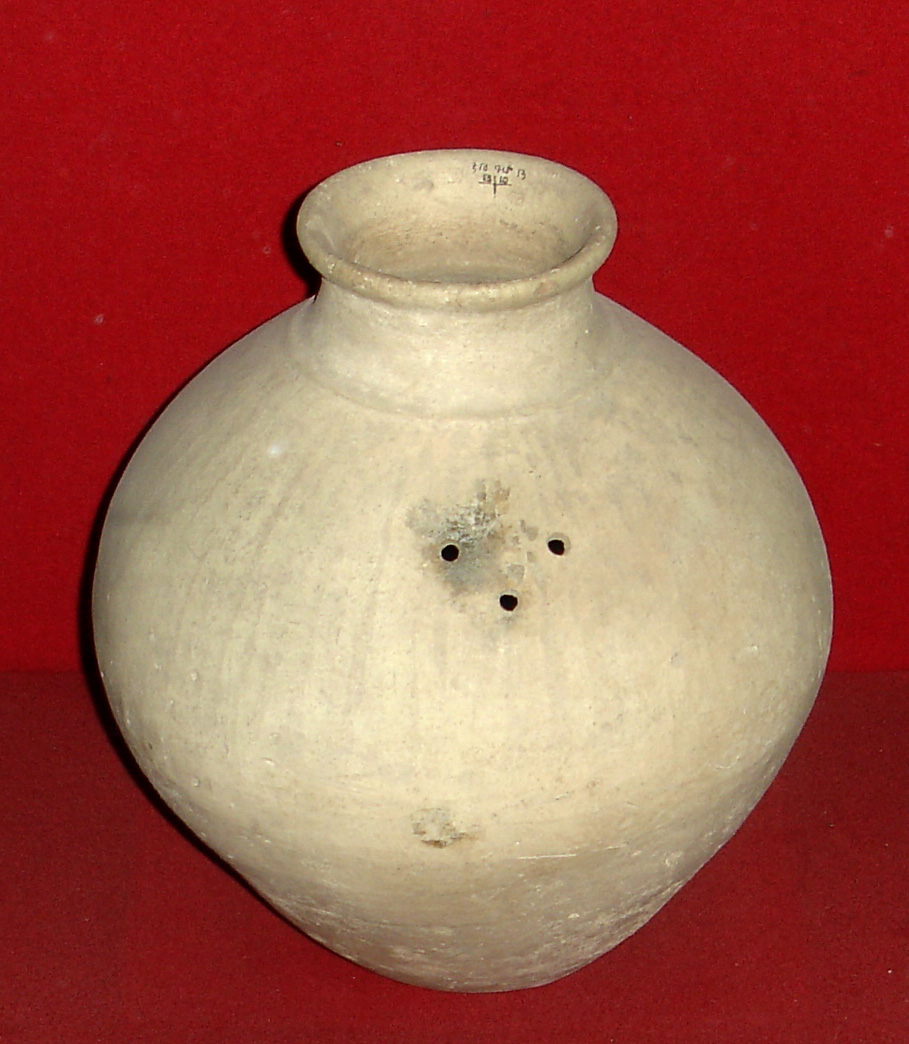
Urn from Karmir Blur (Museum "Erebuni" in Yerevan). Three holes are visible on the vessel

Urartian clay tablets with texts of prayers, incantations and descriptions of religious rituals have not survived. It is believed that magical rituals specific to Mesopotamia, also existed in Urartu. These probably included the magic of the number three: the triple repetition of a word or the threefold use of a formula in descriptions of the ruler's actions addressed to Haldi. Magical significance was also given to certain objects: plain and cylinder seals, as well as bronze belts, which were widespread in Urartu and were believed to have protective powers. Wine played an important role in religious ceremonies. It was practiced to offer it to deities and consume it ritually. Clay and bronze vessels used for ceremonial feasts were decorated with symbols of deities. Bronze cauldrons have been found that were used for ritual offerings to Haldi and Shivini. Ornaments in the shape of a bull's head have been preserved on them.

=== Animal sacrifice ===
The worship of Urartian deities was mainly manifested in sacrificial rituals. These took place both in the open air and in temples. According to the Ishpuini's canon, oxen, cows and sheep were used for sacrifices. Their number depended on the rank of the deity: from one sheep for the goddess Barzia, to 17 oxen and 34 sheep for Haldi. At Tushpa on the Van Rock, a plaza equipped with channels for draining the blood of slaughtered animals was used for sacrifices. Similar plazas have been discovered in other cities.

During the reigns of Argishti I, Sarduri II, Argishti II and Rusa II, new areas in the west and east were annexed to Urartu, resulting in a diversification of Urartian religious practices. Written sources from the period of Rusa II's reign contain descriptions of sacrificial offerings dissimilar to those in the Ishpuini's canon. Sacrifices were made of very young animals. Their age averaged two days. The killing ritual took place in a temple. During excavations at Karmir Blur, the ashes of more than four thousand animals were found. Research has shown that some of them were killed shortly after birth.

During excavations at Toprakkale, a German expedition of archaeologists discovered a sacrificial altar at which, in addition to animal bones, there were bones of sacrificed humans. Traces of human sacrifices were also found in Bastam, a fortress of the period of Rusa II's reign. During excavations at the Ajanis fortress, a clay tablet was found containing a description of the ritual murder of a boy in honor of Haldi.

=== Burial rites ===
Researchers do not single out any form of burial that is characteristic of the Urartian culture. Burial rites varied. Within a single cemetery there were both cremated ashes and ordinary graves. After the corpse was burned, the ashes were placed in an urn and buried in the ground. Sometimes a clay pot with three holes or a broken or cracked clay vessel was used instead of an urn. In some burial sites, objects belonging to the deceased have been discovered: bracelets, bronze belts characteristic of Urartu, broken weapons and bridles. The most common form of burials in Urartu was cremation. It was used primarily during the burial of kings and courtiers. A royal columbarium was discovered in the caves of the Van Rock at the lowest level.

The diversity of burial rites testifies to Urartu's multiculturalism and the lack of initiative to standardize burial practices on the part of the central authority. The design of the Urartian royal tombs at the Van Rock was similar to that used in the construction of tombs in Jerusalem and Phrygia. It is likely that this method of tomb construction originated in ancient Egypt of the Early Dynastic period.

== Temples ==
Urartian temples were small in size. The main part of their decoration was richly decorated and unusable on the battlefield armor made of copper, bronze and precious metals. From the end of the 8th century BC, bronze weapons were almost unused. It was replaced by iron weapons. The old bronze ones were offered by the Urartians as gifts to the deities. According to the annals of Sargon II, his army looted more than a hundred tons of copper, twenty-five shields, one and a half thousand spears and more than three hundred thousand copper and bronze swords and kindjals when plundering the largest Urartian temple in Musasir. The temple at Musasir stood out from others for its architecture and interior design. According to Assyrian accounts, about two tons of gold and ten tons of silver in the form of nuggets and ornaments were removed from its treasuries in 714 BC. In addition, cattle intended for sacrifices were removed from the tabernacle. The Assyrian annals of Sargon II do not contain information about the iron wares that would have been in the temple at Musasir. Therefore, scholars surmise that there was a prohibition in Urartu against bringing iron objects into temples, as there was in the tabernacles in Mesopotamia and Judah.

== Syncretism ==
The hallmark of Urartian religion was syncretism. Unified during the reign of Ishpuini, the state religion, along with the expansion of Urartu's borders, coexisted with the beliefs of conquered areas. Urartian kings did not forbid foreign religious practices. They also erected temples in honor of local deities. In Erebuni, Argishti I built a tabernacle of Hittite and Luvian deities for displaced people from the land of Hatti. Excavations at Karmir Blur uncovered idols typical of the Neolithic era, which were also worshipped during the Urartu period. The variety of burial rites also testifies to religious tolerance.

Elements of foreign beliefs in Urartu

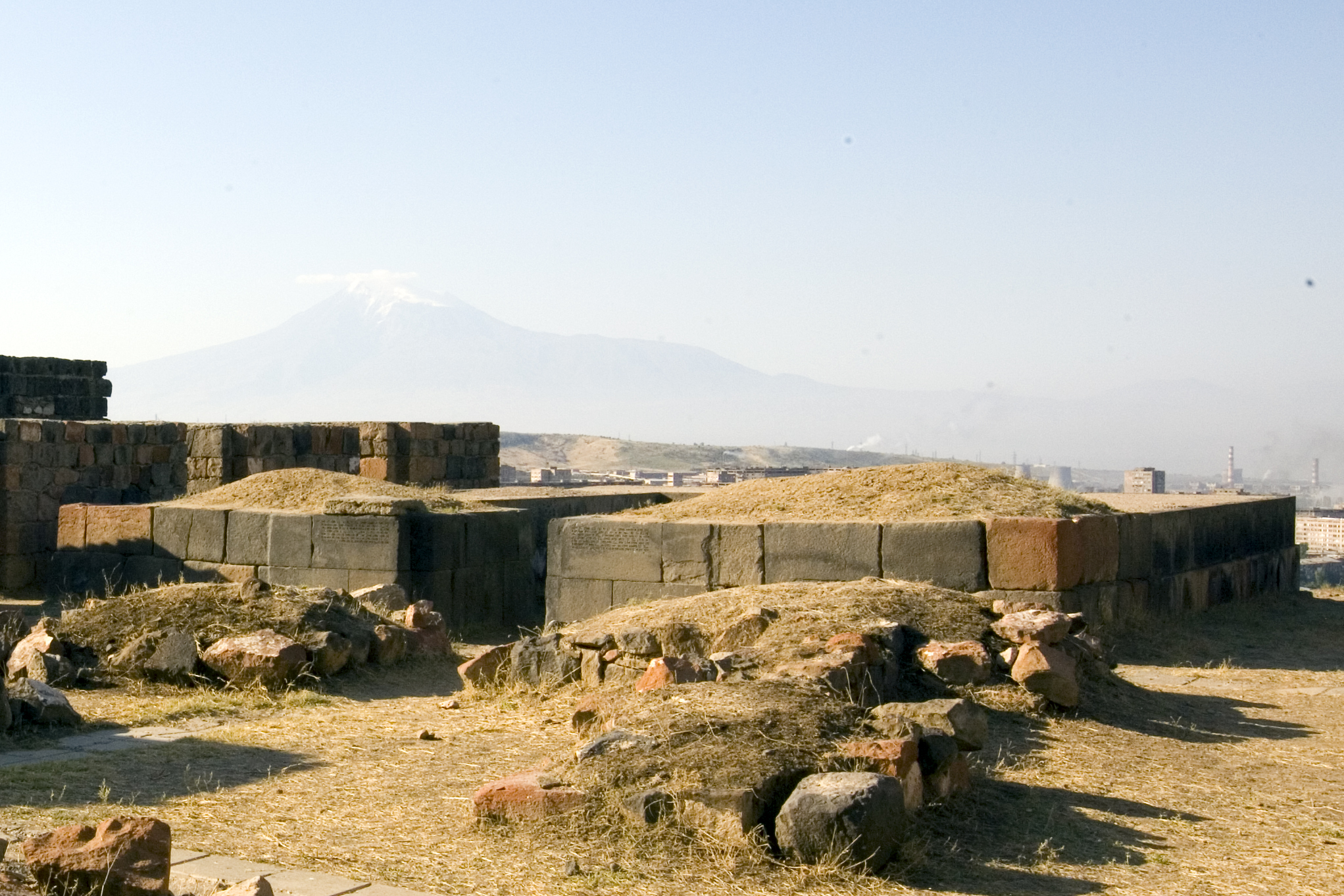
Foundations of the Immarshia temple erected by Argishti I in Erebuni

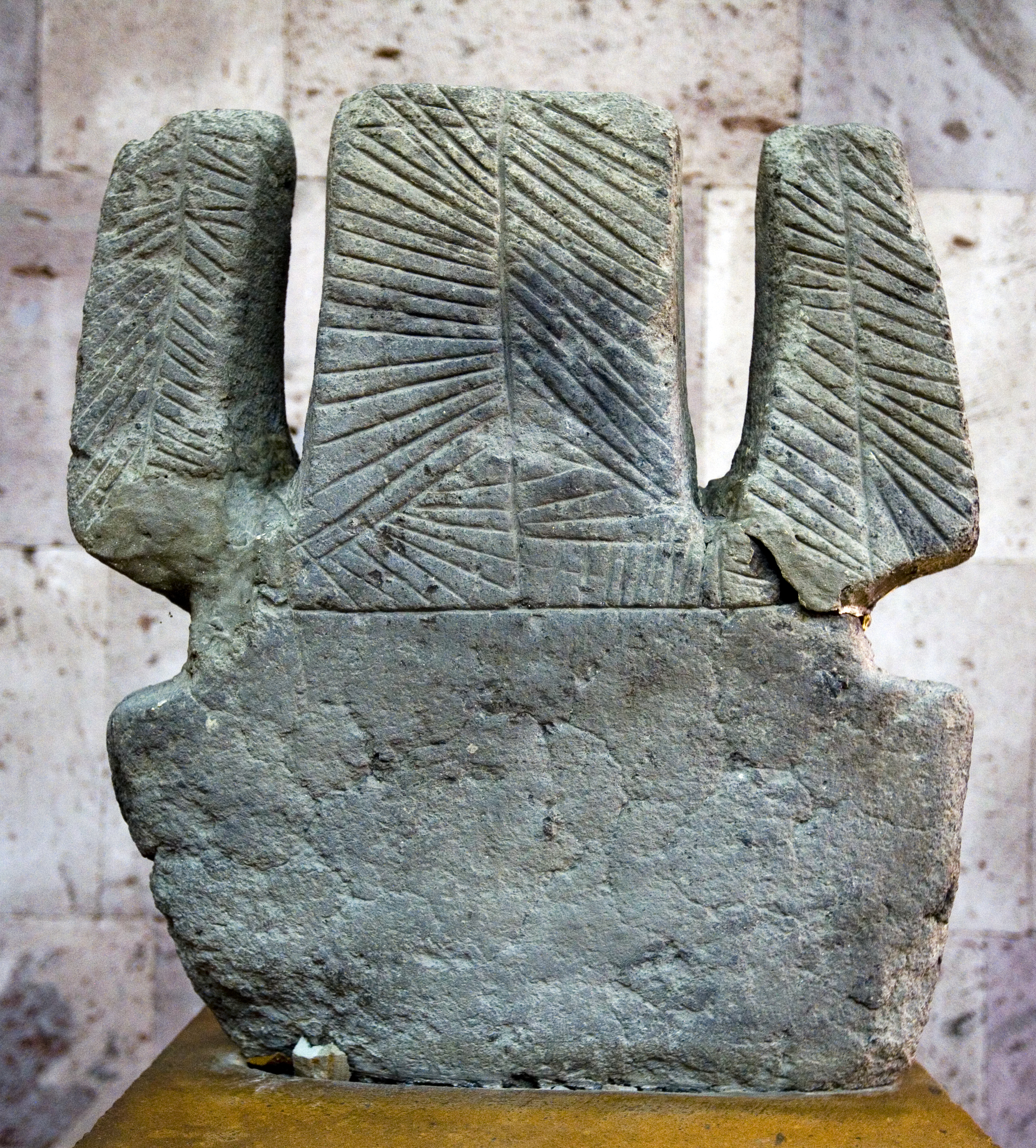
Stone idol from Karmir Blur

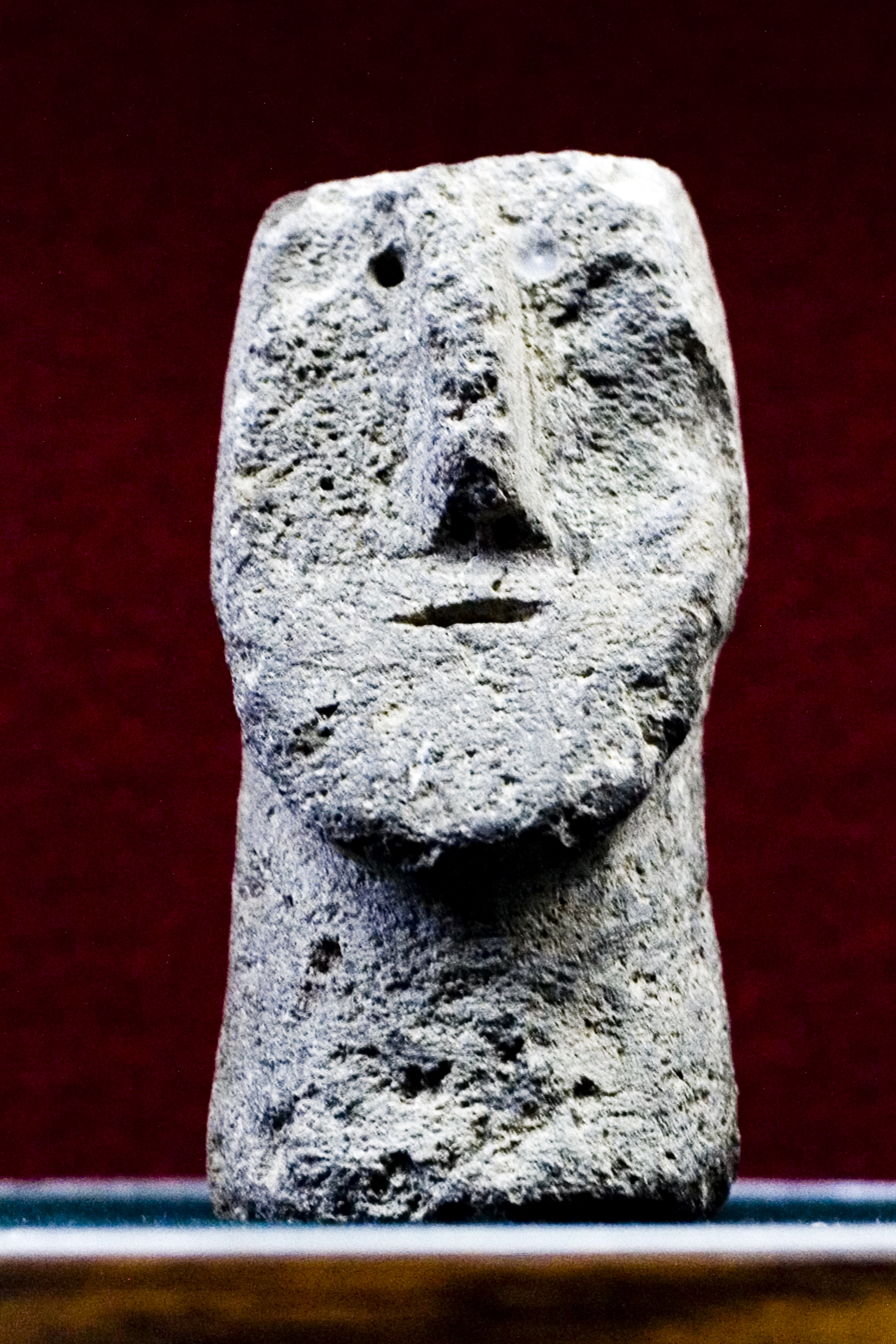
Stone idol from Karmir Blur

== Legacy ==
Urartian culture was subordinate to the ruler. It was mainly centered around a few central cities. After the demolition of these cities, the Urartian cultural heritage was lost. The influence of Urartian civilization on other peoples was limited. The achievements of Urartian culture through the Medes were used by the Achaemenids, who introduced some Urartian symbols into their culture; for example, the winged shield of Faravahar became the symbol of Zoroastrianism. Elements of Urartian religion were adopted by ancient Armenians living in the Armenian Highlands after the fall of Urartu. Zoroastrianism was popularized among the Armenians of the pre-Christian period, and some mythological themes and sacred sites retained their sacred significance in a slightly altered form. For example, the Urartian "god's gate" on the rock next to Rusahinili, where a list of Urartian deities was engraved during the reign of Ishpuini, was renamed by Armenians as "Mher's gate." The new name had a Persian etymology. The name of the hero Mher was etymologically related to Mitra. Armenian tradition has preserved the story of how Mher regularly emerged from the rock. During the period of Urartu's existence, the exit of Haldi was awaited.

In the scientific literature of the first half of the twentieth century, there were more than once hypotheses about the Haldean people (καλδαιοι) mentioned by ancient sources. It was supposed that the Haldeans took their name from the Urartian Haldi. This view was disproved after thorough linguistic and historical research.

== Bibliography ==
- A.T. Smith; K.S. Rubinson, eds. (2003). Archaeology in the borderlands. Investigations in Caucasia and beyond. Los Angeles. ISBN 1-931745-01-3.
- Belli van O. (1989). The capital of Urartu, Eastern Anatolia. Instanbul. ISBN 975-479-093-0.
- Burney C.A.; Lang D.M. (1972). The peoples of the hills. Ancient Ararat and Caucaus. New York–Washington. ISBN 0-297-00495-6.
- Campbell S.; Green A. (1995). The archaeology of death in the Ancient Near East (oxbow monographs in archaeology). Oxford. ISBN 0-946897-93-X.
- Chahin M. (2001). The Kingdom of Armenia. London. ISBN 0-7007-1452-9.
- Çilingiroğlu A.; French D.H. (1994). "The proceedings of the third Anatolian Iron Ages colloquium held at Van". Anatolian Iron Ages. Vol. 3. Ankara. pp. 6–12. ISBN 1-898249-05-9.
- Çilingiroğlu, Altan; Salvini, Mirjo (2001). Ayanis I. Ten years' excavations at Rusaḫinili Eiduru-kai, 1989–1998. Rome: Istituto per gli studi micenei ed egeo-anatolici CNR. ISBN 88-87345-04-X. OCLC 50604710.
- Edwards I.E.S. (1982). Cambridge ancient history. 1. Vol. 3. London. ISBN 0-521-22496-9.
- Johnston S.I. (2004). Religions of the ancient world. A guide. Cambridge. ISBN 0-674-01517-7.
- König F.W. (1955). Handbuch der Chaldischen Inschriften. Graz.
- Krauss R. (1975). Tierknochenfunde aus Bastam in Nordwest-Azerbaidjan/Iran (Fundmaterial der Grabungen 1970 und 1972). München.
- Lehmann-Haupt C.F. (1910–1931). Armenien, einst und jetzt. Vol. 2. Berlin.
- Redgate A.E. (1998). The Armenians. Oxford. ISBN 0-631-14372-6.
- Sasson J.M. (1995). Civilizations of the Ancient Near East. Vol. 2. New York. ISBN 0-684-19279-9.
- Studi Micenei ed Egeo-Anatolici, vol. 44, 2002
- R.G. Hovannisian, ed. (2004). University of Los Angeles. The Armenian people from ancient to modern times. New York. ISBN 1-4039-6421-1.
- Zimansky P.E. (1998). Ancient Ararat. A handbook of Urartian studies. New York. ISBN 0-88206-091-0.
- Zimansky P.E. (1985). Ecology and empire. The structure of the Urartian state. Chicago. ISBN 0-918986-41-9.
- Арутюнян Н.В., Земледелие и скотоводство Урарту, Ереван 1964.
- "Вестник древней истории", 1 (1927), 2 (1948), 2–4 (1951), 1-4 (1953), 1 (1954), 2 (1958), 1 (1987).
- Древний Восток. Этнокультурные связи, Москва 1988.
- Дьяконов И. М., Языки древней Передней Азии, Москва 1967.
- "Известия АН Армянской СССР. Общественные науки", 10 (1958).
- История древнего мира, T. 1, Ранняя древность, red. И.М. Дьяконов, В.Д. Неронова, И.С. Свенцицкая, Москва 1989. ISBN 5-02-016782-7.
- История Древнего Мира, vol. 2, Расцвет Древних обществ, ред. И.М. Дьяконов, В.Д. Неронова, И.С. Свенцицкий, Москва 1983.
- Капанцян Г., Об урартском божестве Шебиту, Ереван 1947.
- Марр Н.Я., Орбели И.А., Археологическая экспедиция 1916 года в Ван, Петроград 1922.
- Меликишвили Г.А., Наири-Урарту, Тбилиси 1954.
- Меликишвили Г.А., Урартские клинообразные надписи, Москва 1960.
- Пиотровский Б.Б., Ванское царство (Урарту), Москва 1959.
- Пиотровский Б.Б., Кармир-Блур II. Результаты раскопок 1949–1950, Ереван 1952.
- "Сообщения Академии наук ГрузССР", 14 (1953).
- Тер-Саркисянц А., История и культура армянского народа с древнейших времён до начала XIX века, Москва 2005. ISBN 5-02-018445-4.
- Токарев С.А., Мифы народов мира, vol. 2, Москва 1982.
