= Bagmasti =

Urartian goddess

Bagmasti (Armenian: Բաղմաստ) was a Urartian goddess. She was worshiped at Musasir in Ararat and was the companion or consort of Ḫaldi. Her temple, together with that of Ḫaldi was plundered and burned by Sargon II king of Assyria. At the excavation of Musasir references to "Ḫaldi and his wife, Bagmashtu" were found inscribed on some of the items.

== Sources ==
=== References ===
- Piotrovsky, Boris B. (1969) The Ancient Civilization of Urartu: An Archaeological Adventure. Cowles Book Co. ISBN 9780214667930
