= Ḫaldi =

Urartian war god

- Supreme and war god
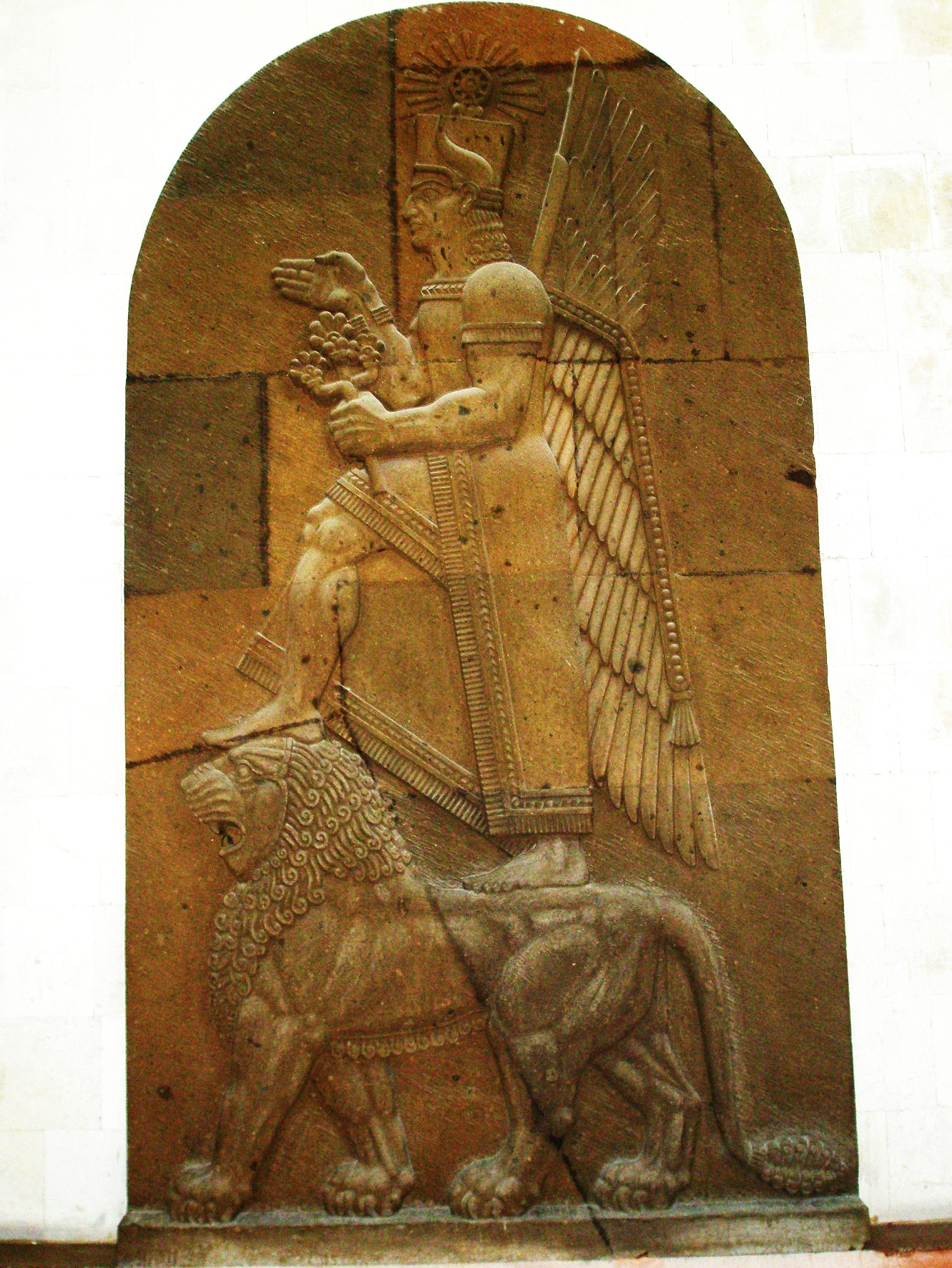
- Depiction of the Araratian god Khaldi (Haldi), standing on a lion. Erebuni Fortress Museum: Yerevan, Armenia
- Other names: Khaldi
- Affiliation: Urartian mythology
- Abode: Urartu
- Symbol: Lion

Genealogy
- Children: Ardinis (?)

Ḫaldi (^{d,}Ḫaldi, also known as Khaldi) was one of the three chief deities of Urartu (Urarat/Ararat Kingdom) along with Teisheba and Shivini. He was a warrior god to whom the kings of Urartu would pray for victories in battle. Ḫaldi was portrayed as a man with or without wings, standing on a lion.

His principal shrine was at Ardini (Muṣaṣir). The temples dedicated to Khaldi were adorned with weapons such as swords, spears, bows and arrows, and shields hung from the walls and were sometimes known as "the house of weapons".

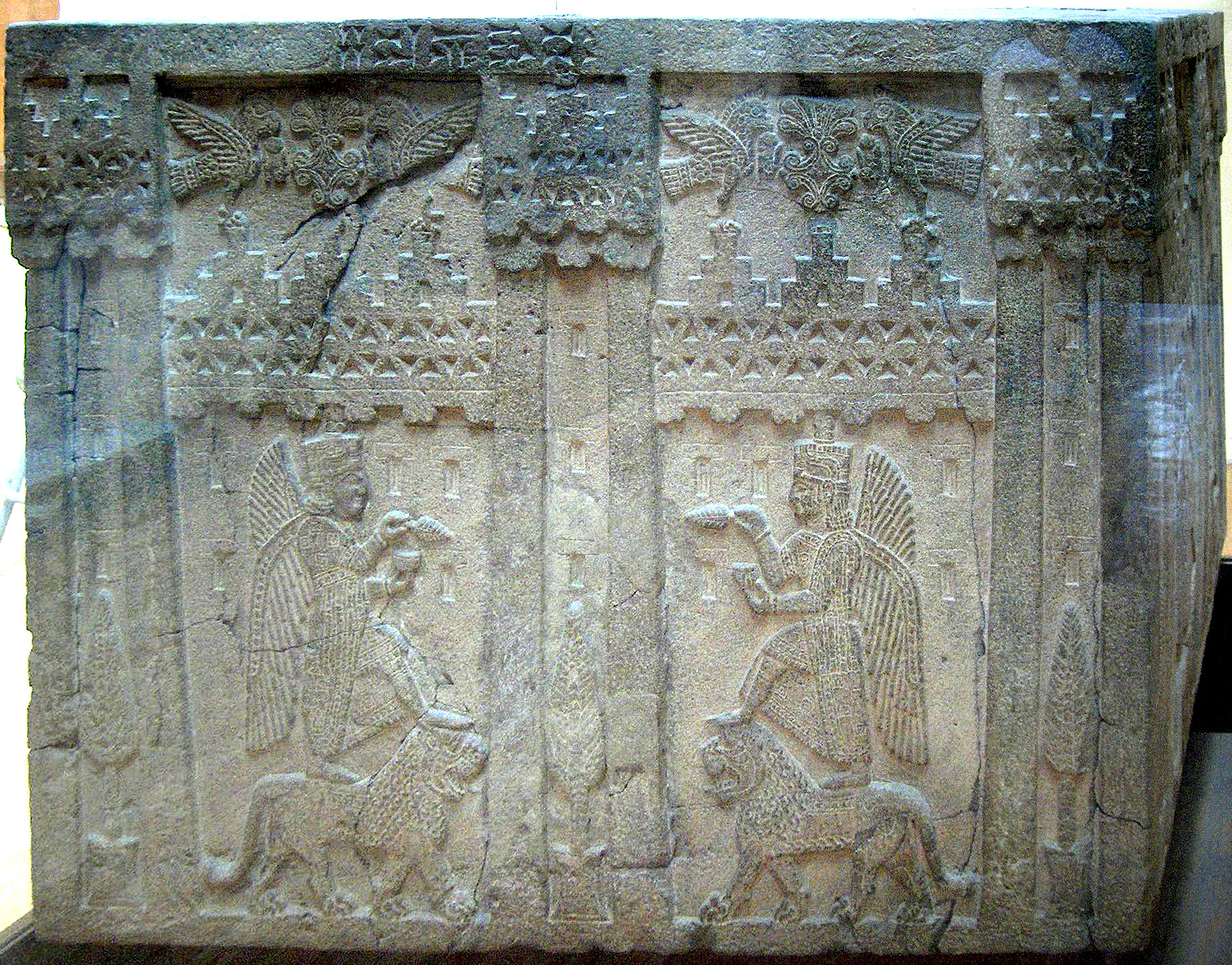
Column base; the god Khaldi stands on a lion, holding in his left hand a bowl and in his right hand a spearhead (or a plant) Reign of King Rusa II (685–645 BCE); Urartu; Museum of Anatolian Civilizations, Ankara

== History ==
According to Urartologist Paul Zimansky, Haldi was not a native Urartian god but apparently an obscure Akkadian deity (which explains the location of the main temple of worship for Haldi in Musasir, believed to be near modern Rawandiz, Iraq). Haldi was not initially worshipped by Urartians, at least as their chief god, as his cult does not appear to have been introduced until the reign of Ishpuini.

Ḫaldi, written in cuneiform

According to Michael C. Astour, Haldi could be etymologically related to the Hurrian word "heldi", meaning "high". An alternate theory postulates that the name could be of Indo-European (possibly Helleno-Armenian) or Old Armenian origin, meaning "sun god" (compare with Hellenic Helios and Roman Sol). The Urartian Kings used to erect steles dedicated to Ḫaldi in which they inscribed the successes of their military campaigns, the buildings built, and also the agricultural activities that took place during their reign.

== Mythology ==
Along with Ḫaldi of Ardini, the other two chief deities of Urartu were Theispas of Kumenu, and Shivini of Tushpa. Of all the gods of the Urartian pantheon, the most inscriptions are dedicated to Ḫaldi. His wife was the goddess Arubani and / or the goddess Bagmasti.

He was the primary god of the most prominent group of Urartian tribes. Some sources claim that the legendary patriarch and founder of the Armenians, Hayk, is derived from Ḫaldi, but other theories about the etymology of Hayk are more widely accepted. (Note: Hayk, the legendary archer, has been part of Armenian culture and history since time immemorial. Hayk is considered the patriarch of the Armenians, and is indeed for this reason that Armenians call themselves Hay (pronounced haï). Hayk derives from the Urartian deity Khaldi, whose divide attributes he originally assumed with the constellation Orion. The well-known epic of Hayk's fight against Bel [when read as a metaphor] provides substantial proof that Hayk and his people stood up against Bel and halted the unrestrained influx of Semitic peoples from the south. — Hacikyan et al. (2000–2005))

Haldi's depiction in Uratian art has been the subject of confusion, and as of 2012 no images of him explicitly labelled as such were known. In 1963, Margarete Riemschneider proposed that Ḫaldi was "pictureless" and never depicted in Uratian imagery, and suggested that he was symbolized by a lance. Zimansky (2012) wrote that he had been a skeptic of this theory, but

"I think it unlikely that the paucity of securely identified depictions of Haldi can be due entirely to the poverty of secure identifications in Uratian art generally"

and suggested that one image, of a man surrounded by flames leading a pantheon of gods into battle, might represent the king – a "mortal agent ... empowered by the divine".

== Gallery ==
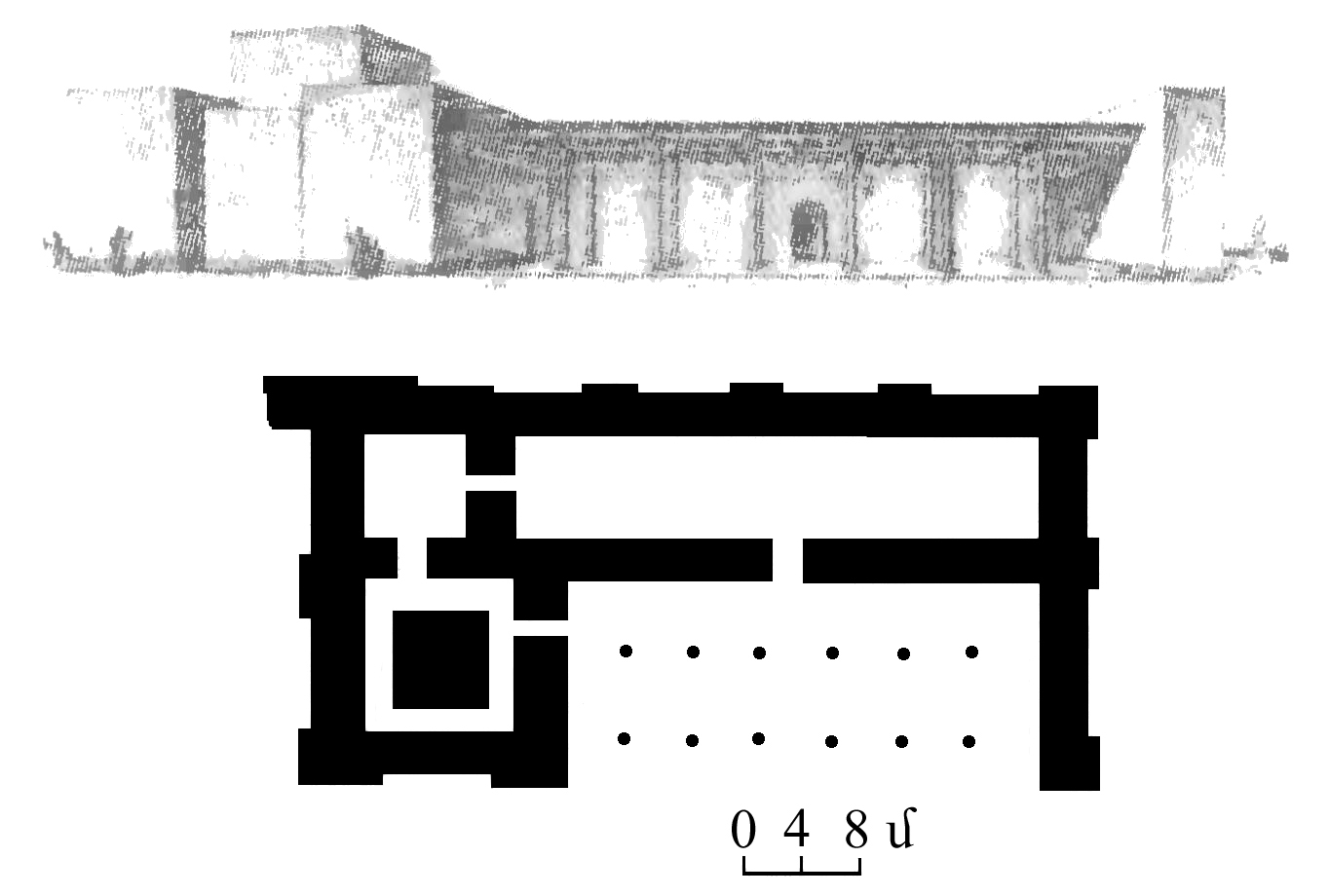
Khaldi's temple in Erebuni, 782 BCE

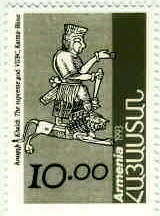
Khaldi god standing on a lion, Armenian postage stamp, 1993

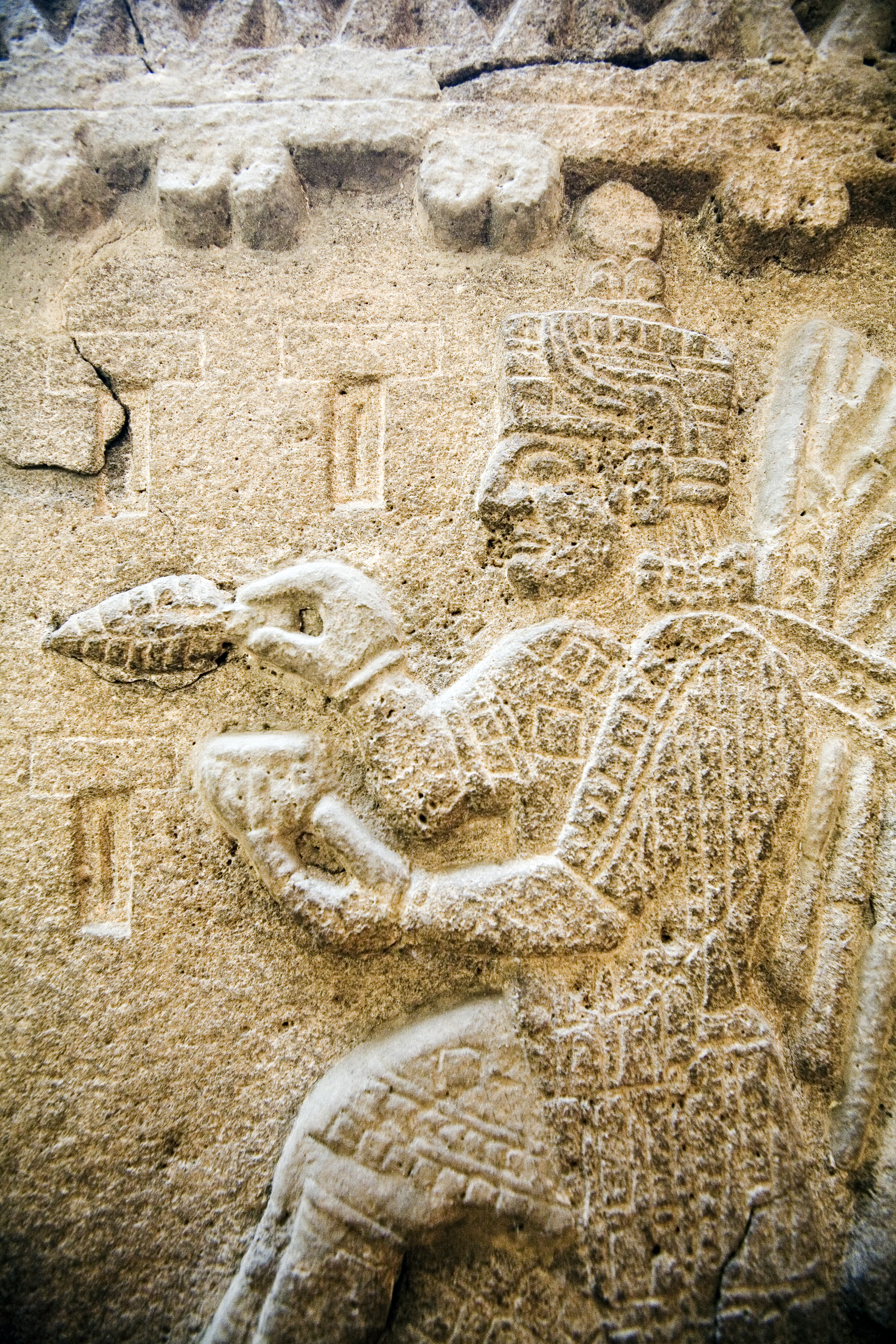

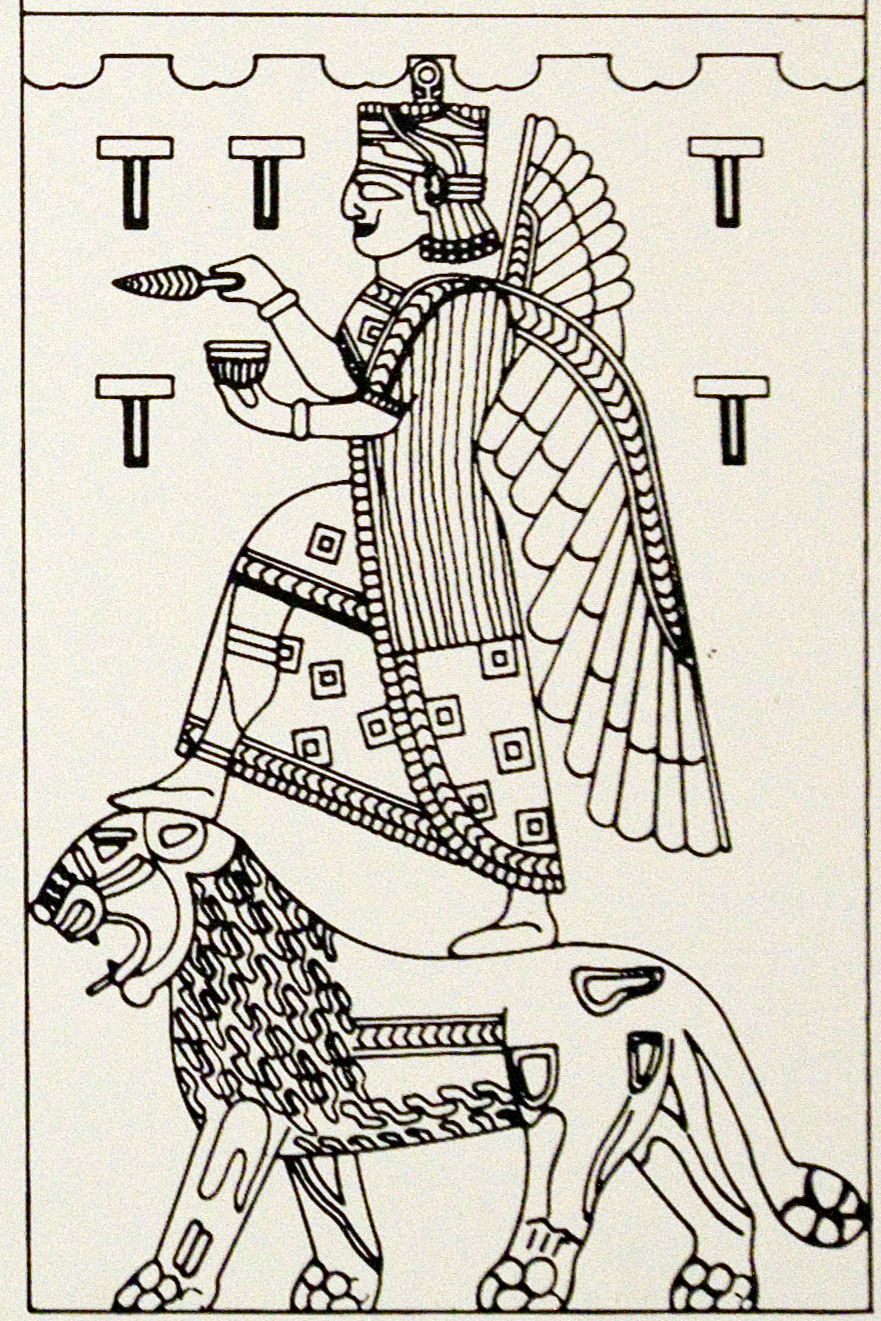

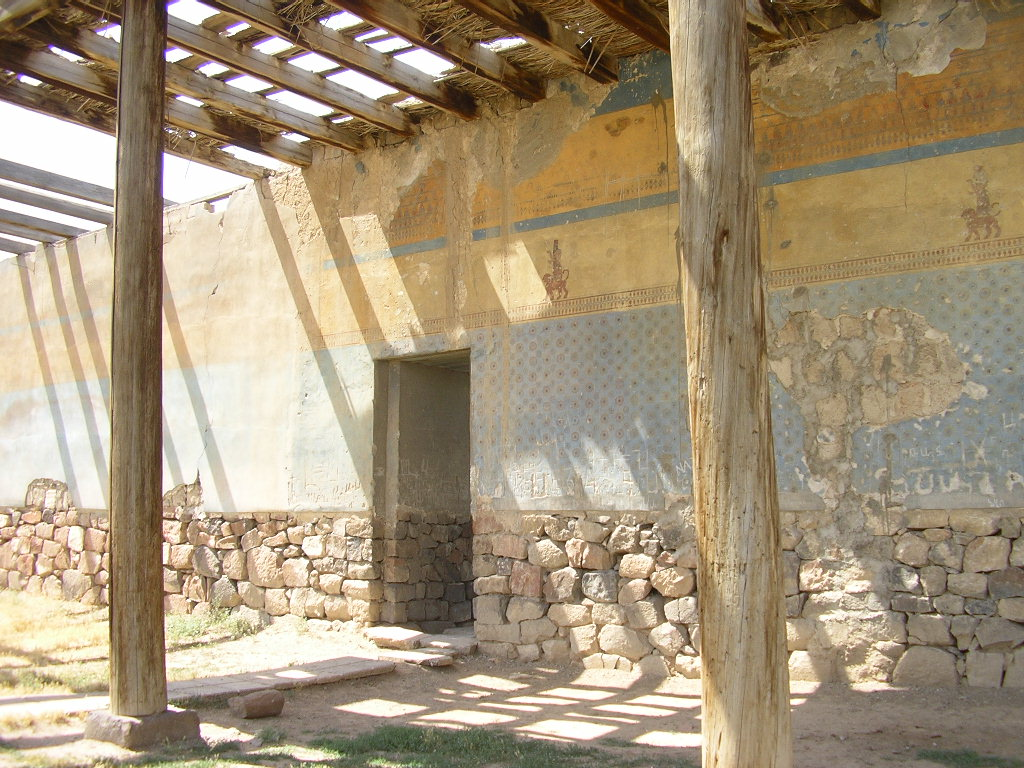
Erebuni Fortress

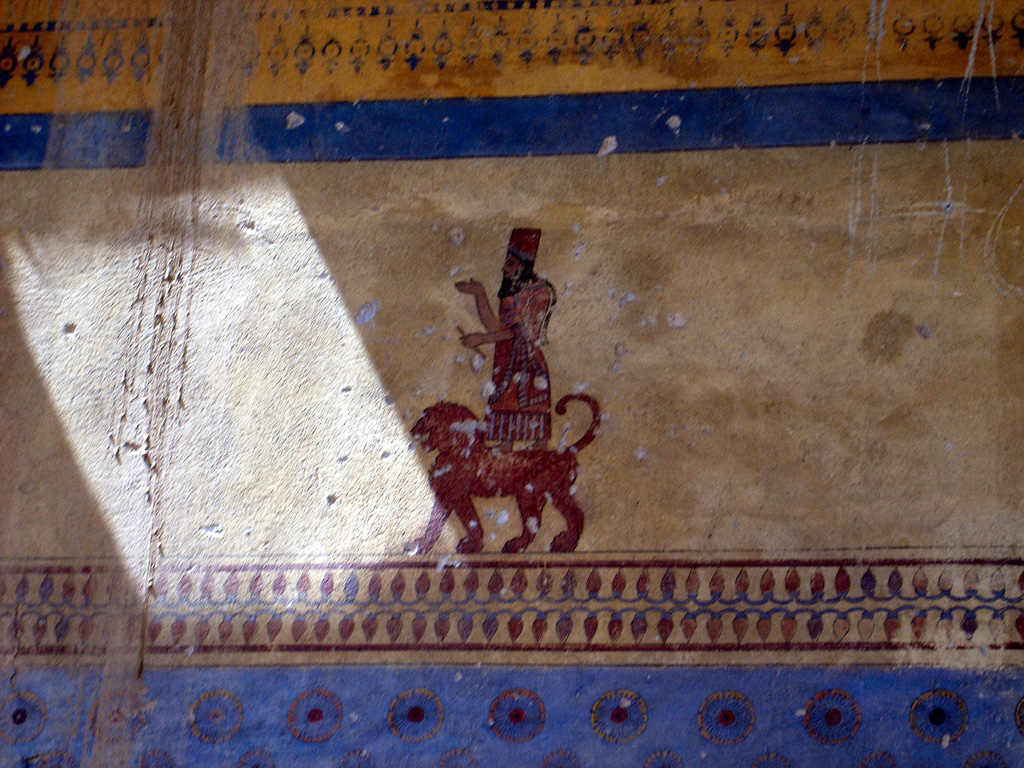
Erebuni Fortress

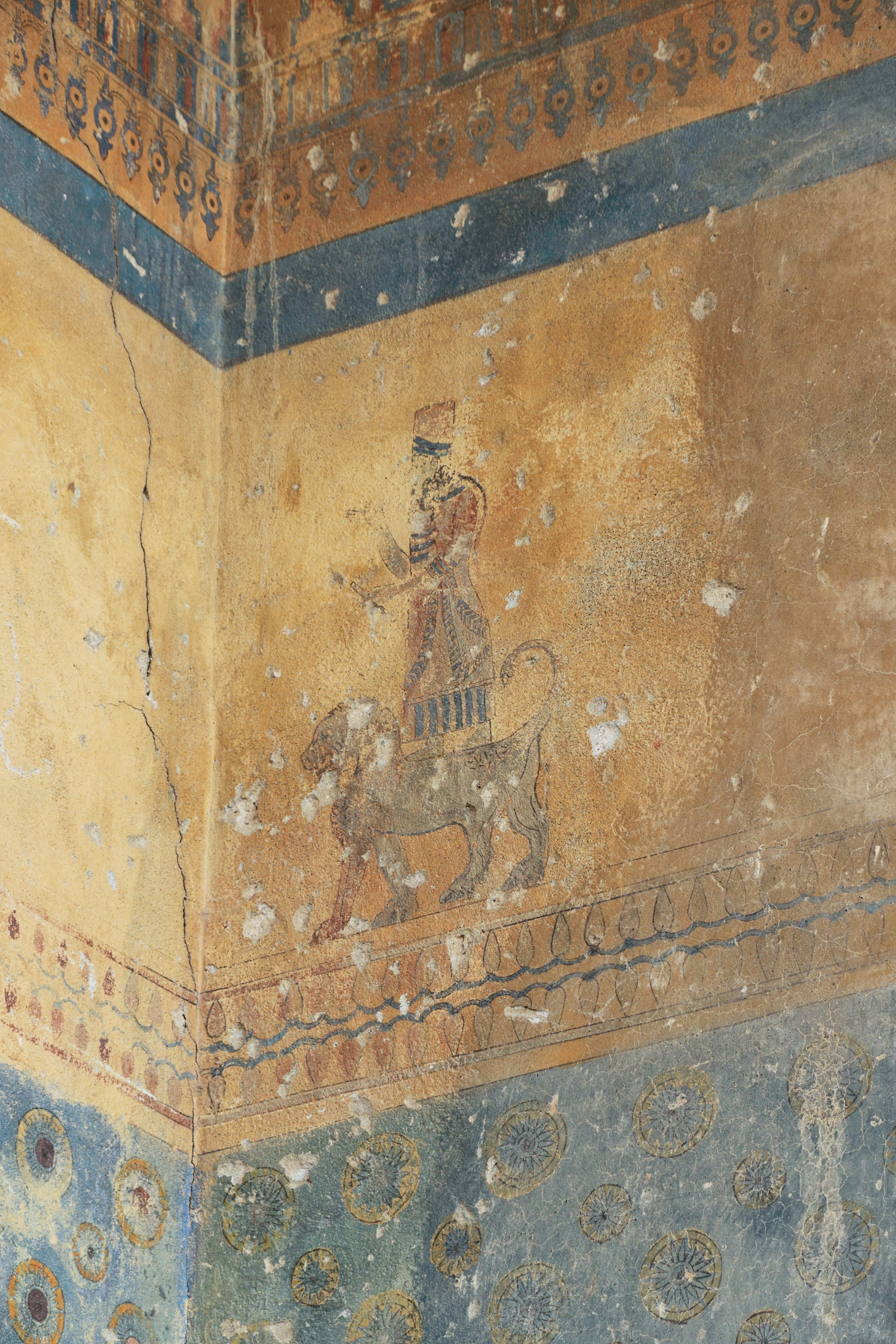
Erywań, Erebuni Fortress

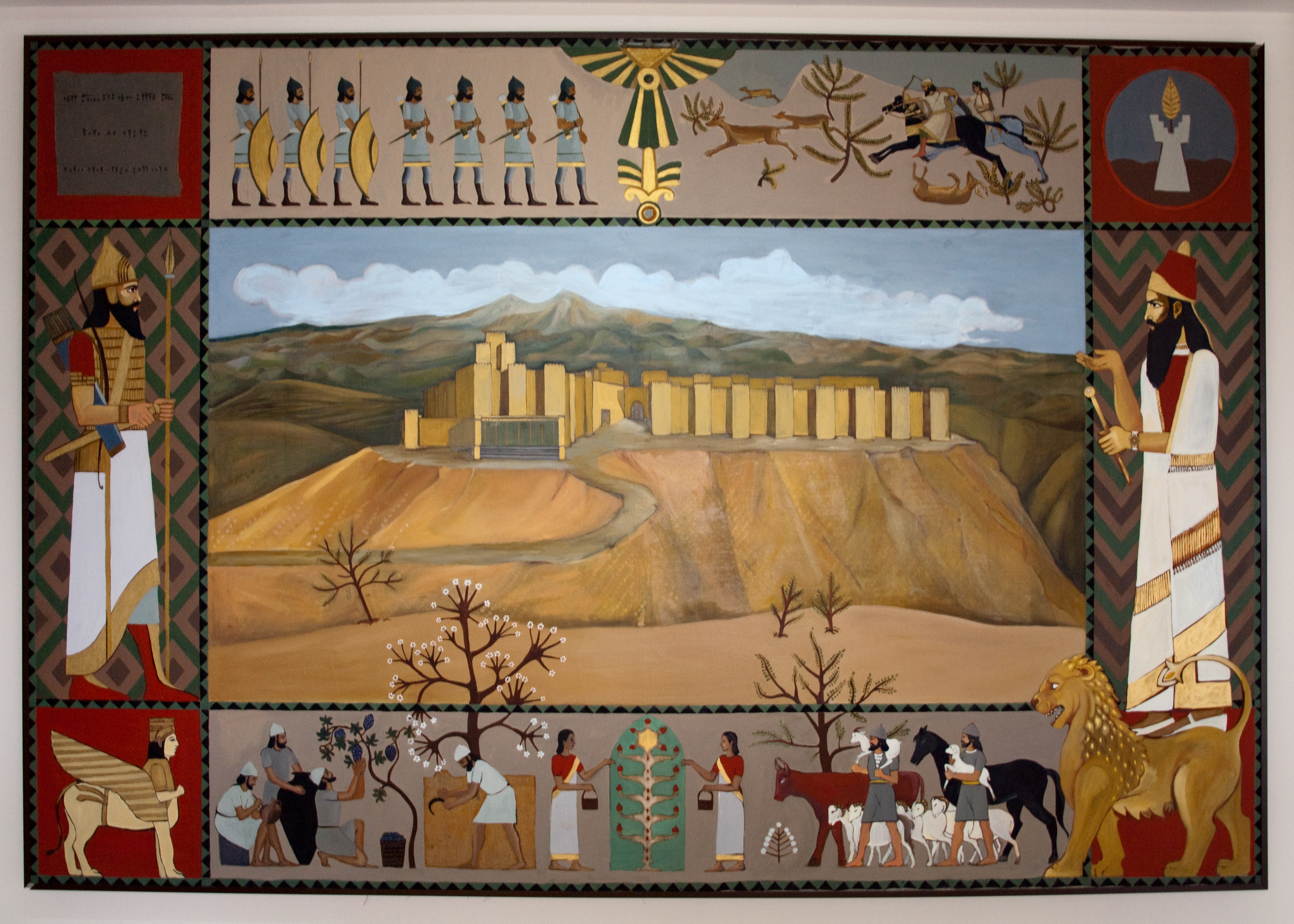
Erebuni pattern

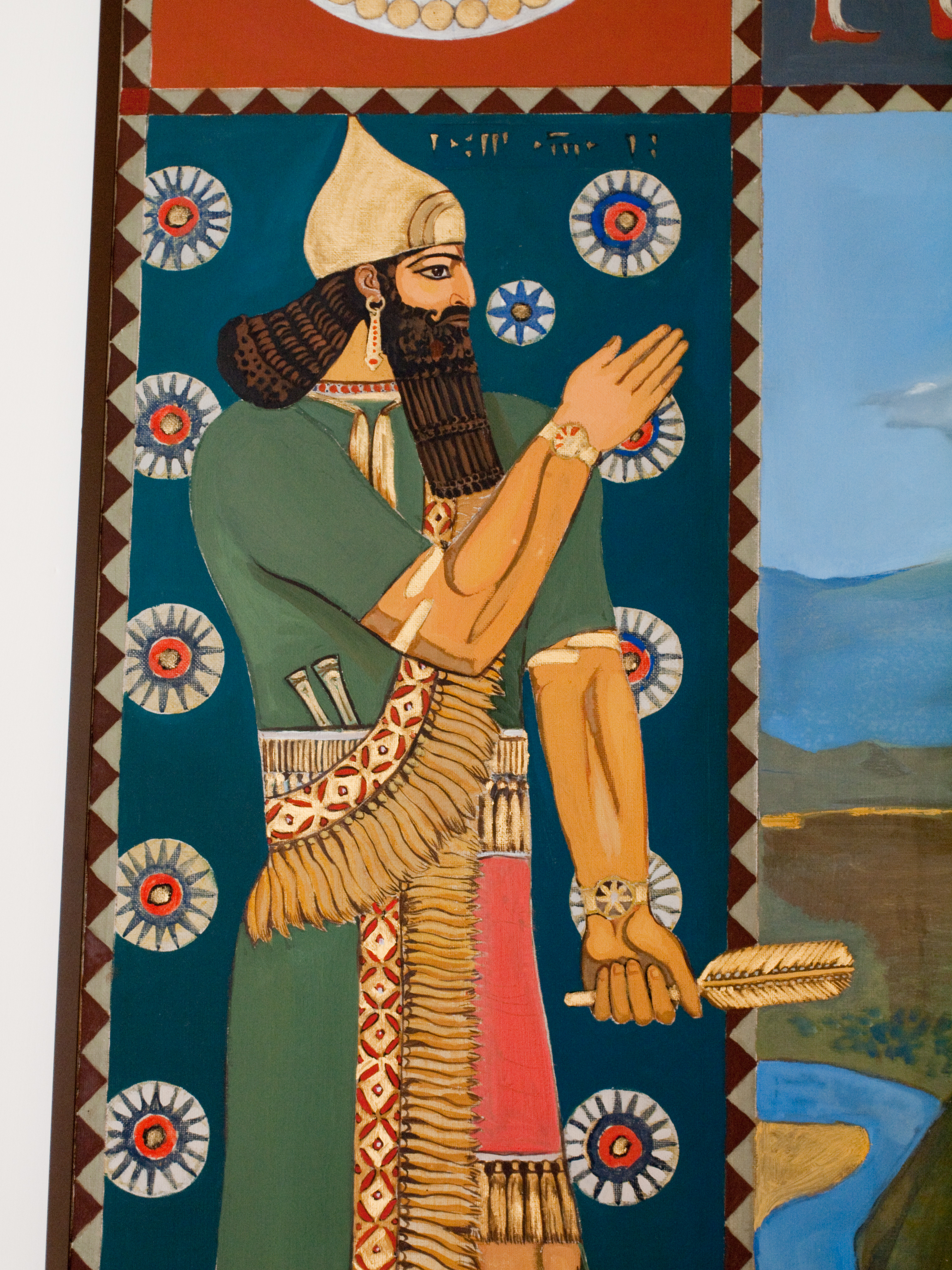
Modern Armenian reproduction

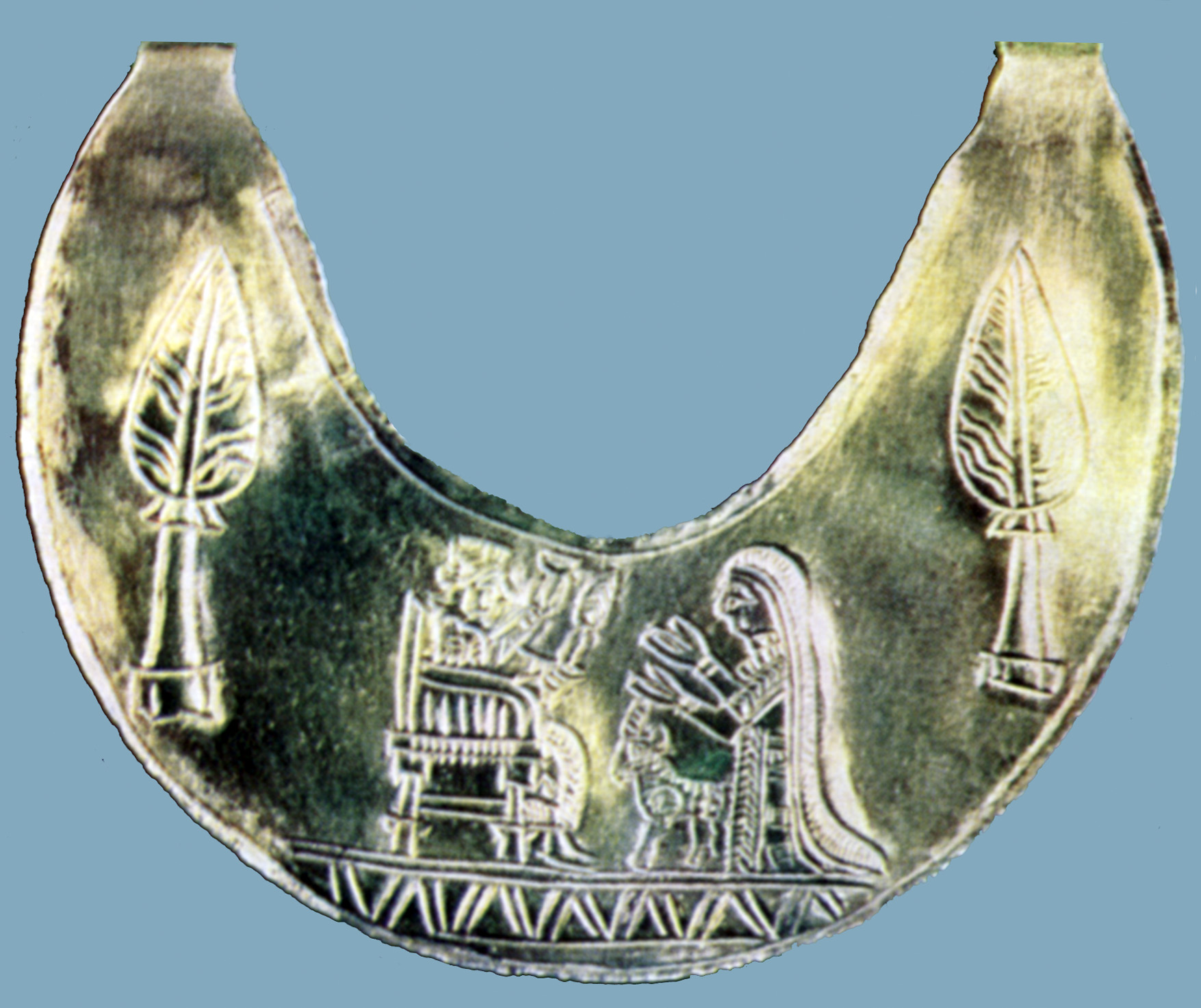
Urartian Carcanet
