= Arubani =

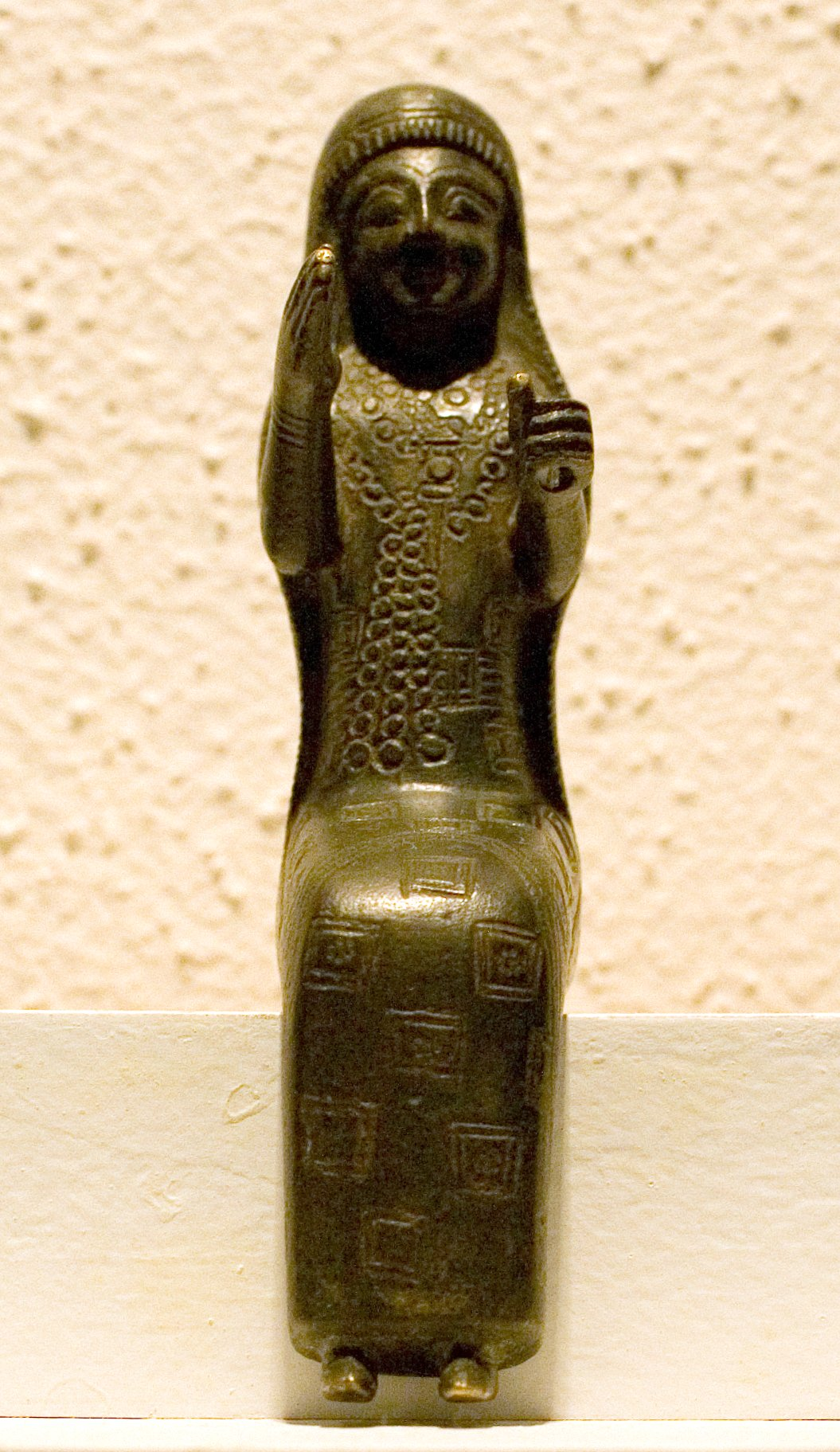

Arubani is the Urartian's goddess of fertility and art. She was also the wife of their supreme god, Khaldi.

== Sources ==
- Piotrovsky, Boris B. (1969) The Ancient Civilization of Urartu: An Archaeological Adventure. Cowles Book Co. ISBN 9780214667930
- Tacentral.com
