= Architecture of Urartu =

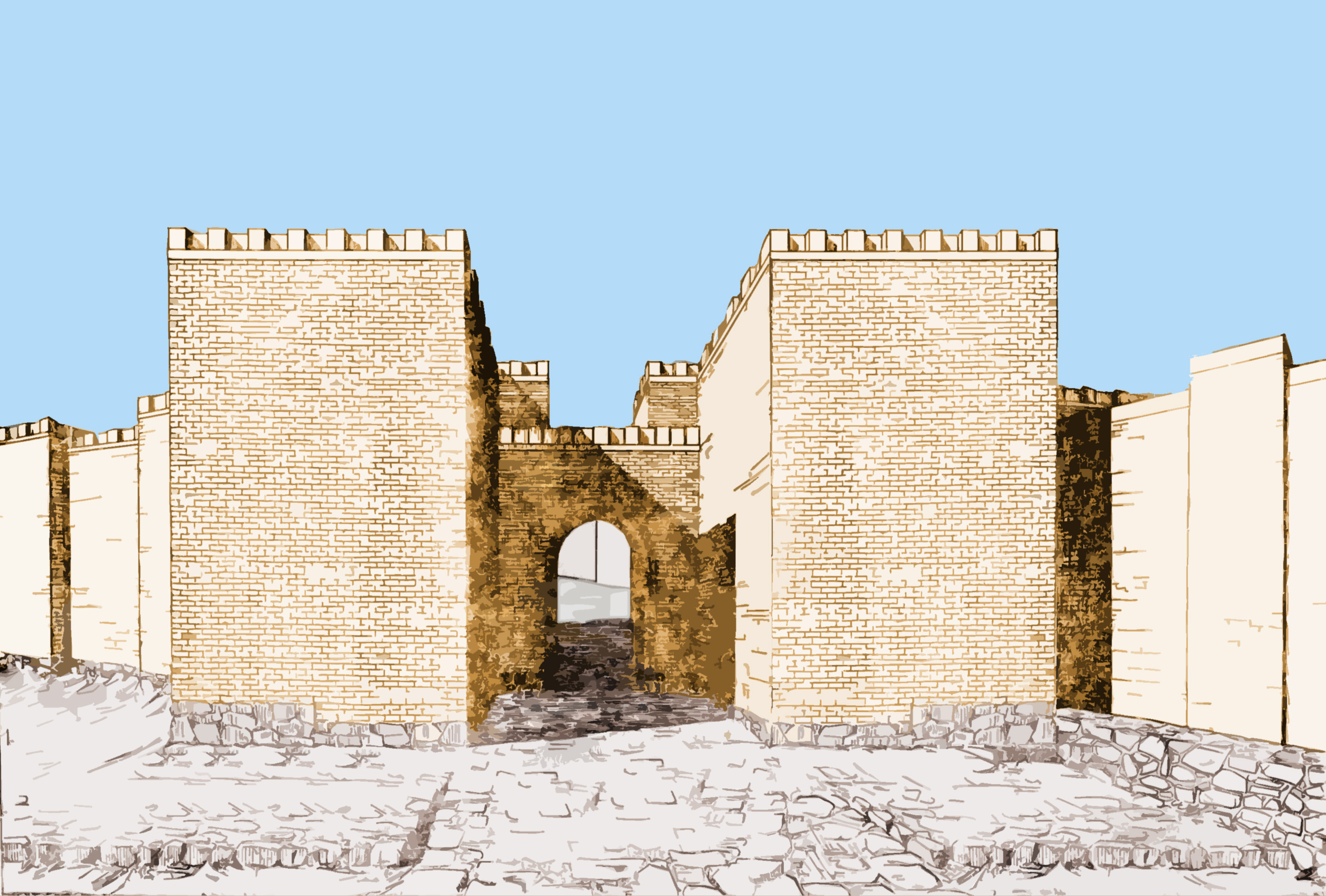
Attempt to reconstruct the fortress of Teishebaini

The architecture of Urartu encompasses the construction methods, spatial organization, and urban planning of the Urartian culture, an Iron Age civilization located in Anatolia and the Armenian Highlands. The Urartians are known for their fortresses, temples, and water management systems, which were integral to their administrative and military infrastructure. The fortress of Teishebaini, named after the Urartian god Teisheba, serves as a notable example of their architectural practices.

Urartian settlements were often situated near water sources and along trade routes, reflecting their emphasis on resource accessibility and economic stability.The study of Urartian architecture provides insights into the societal organization, political structure, and cultural practices of the Urartian civilization, as well as its interactions with neighboring regions in the ancient Near East.

== Prehistory ==
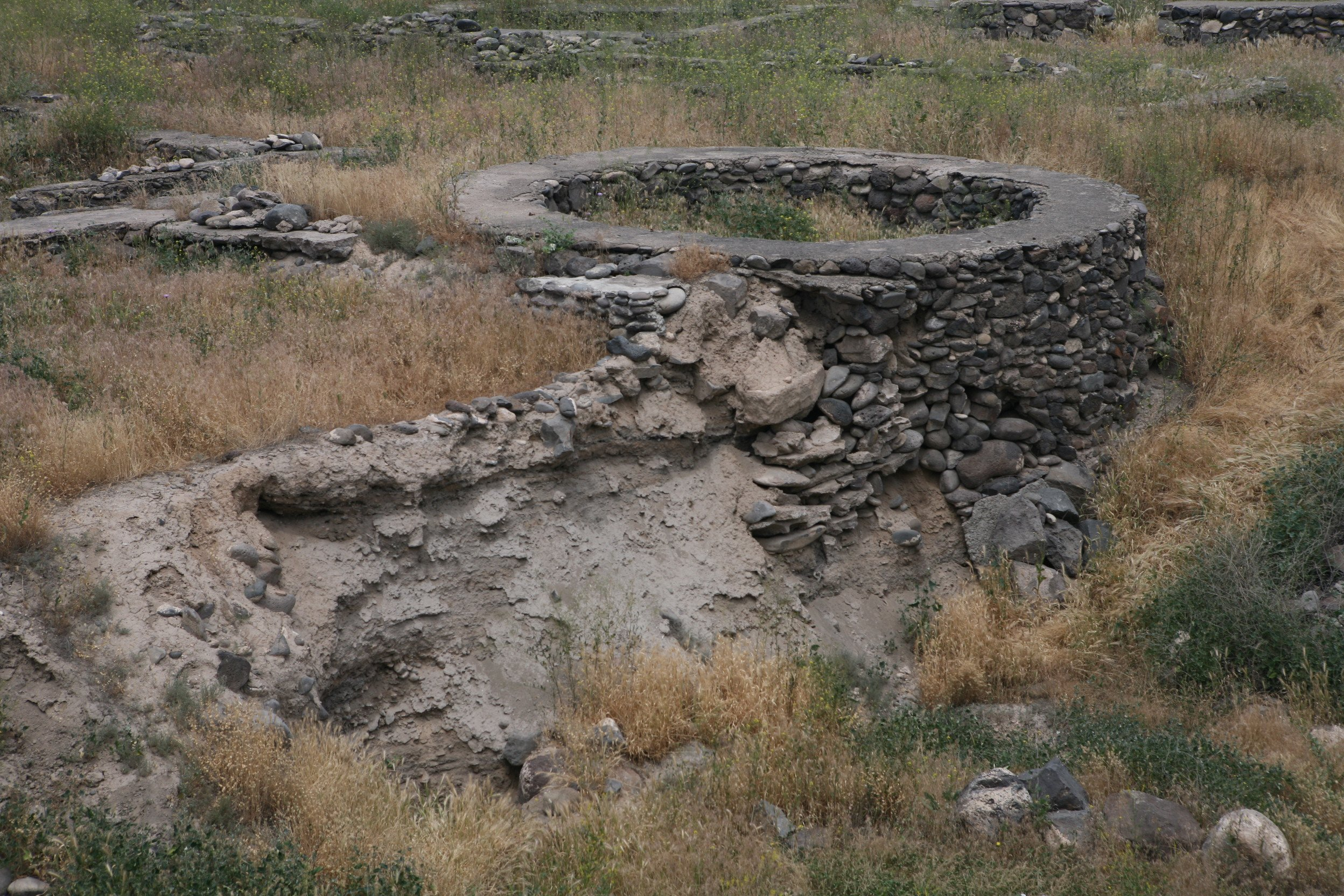
Remains of a Neolithic settlement, the Shengavit site (4th millennium BCE)

The earliest constructions in the Armenian highlands date back to the Paleolithic and Neolithic eras, with remnants discovered in locations like Artvin, Arzni, Abovyan, Vagharshapat, Nurnus, and Sisian. Neolithic settlements from the 5th–4th millennia BCE were built using materials such as mud bricks, wood, reed mixed with clay, and stone.

Houses were constructed in circular or rectangular plans. As families grew and required additional space, extensions were added in similar shapes, resulting in structures suitable for extended families or clans. The outer walls were often thick, sometimes double-layered, with a gap between for additional strength. Settlements were further fortified by surrounding walls, protecting the entire community. The space between the houses and the defensive walls was filled with earth and stone debris for reinforcement. An example is the settlement near Shengavit, dated to the late 4th millennium BCE.

During the Neolithic, architectural forms like menhirs, cromlechs, and dolmens emerged, some later adapted as dwellings. In the Bronze Age (3rd–2nd millennia BCE), earth-covered kurgans surrounded by walls became common. These mounds served as burial sites for chieftains and tribal elders and could house chariots and valuable artifacts, reflecting the deceased's social status.

From the 3rd millennium BCE, settlements were often built on mountain peaks or cliffs, forming so-called "cyclopean fortresses". These were constructed using large, hewn stone blocks, with districts separated by additional walls. Defensive walls encircled the peaks, and a citadel provided security for the settlement.

In both the Neolithic and Bronze Ages, constructions typically utilized natural rock or were built directly on the ground without mortar. Stones used for walls were either polygonal, regular, or left unworked, carefully fitted together.

The first cities on the Armenian highlands date to the latter half of the 2nd millennium BCE, when clusters of human habitation began forming. By the 1st millennium BCE, these settlements evolved into cities. Their construction methods resembled Neolithic settlements, retaining traditional approaches for individual houses. Houses were divided into two sections: a circular part with a false dome and a rectangular part with a flat roof. An example of such a city is found in the lower layers of the Urartian site of Teishebaini (Karmir Blur).

== General characteristics ==
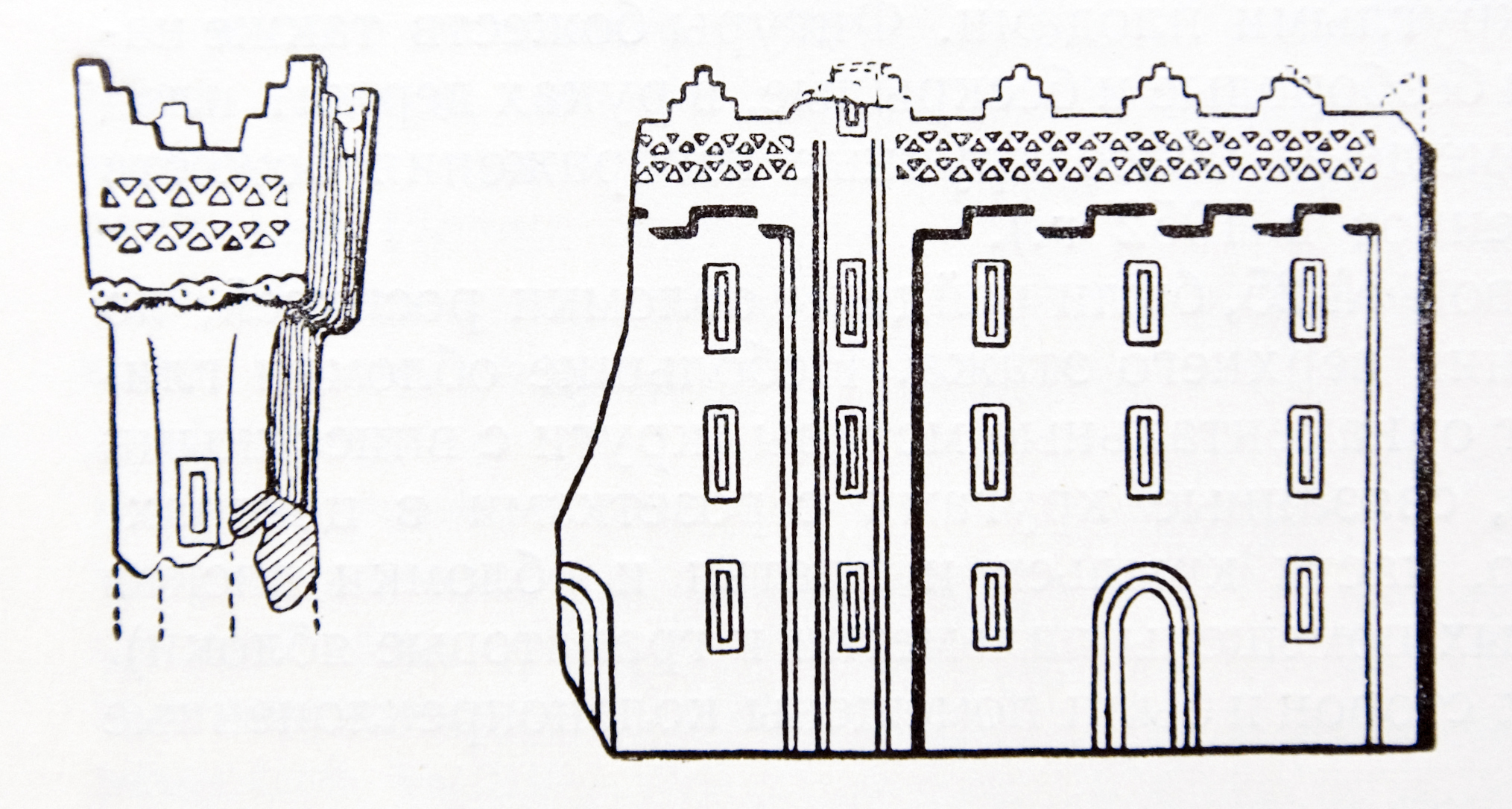
Fragment of buildings in Tushpa reconstructed based on engravings on bronze objects, 1910, British Museum

Urartian architecture blended local Neolithic construction traditions with forms derived from the architecture of neighboring states and cultures with which Urartu maintained contact, such as Mesopotamia, Anatolia, and Syria. A distinctive feature of Urartian architecture was its ability to combine the monumentalism of Mesopotamian structures with the lightness of Syro-Hittite forms.

During the peak of Urartu's prominence (9th–6th centuries BCE), architecture held a dominant position in Urartian art. Numerous secular, sacred, and utilitarian structures from this period have survived, including bridges, canals, reservoirs, and roads.

The primary building materials were stone, wood, and clay. Stonecutting techniques retained from the Neolithic era were used for foundations, walls, and socles. Decorative elements were often crafted from mud bricks, typically measuring 52 × 35 × 15 cm or 52 × 52 × 15 cm. Interior walls were smoothed with gypsum and adorned with paintings or orthostates, a practice borrowed from Syrian architecture. Occasionally, two-tone stones were arranged in checkerboard mosaics on walls, a pattern also seen on floors. Wooden flooring was sometimes used alongside stone. Coverings were flat and supported by wooden beams; while rock-cut and cave structures featured vaulting.

== Urban planning ==
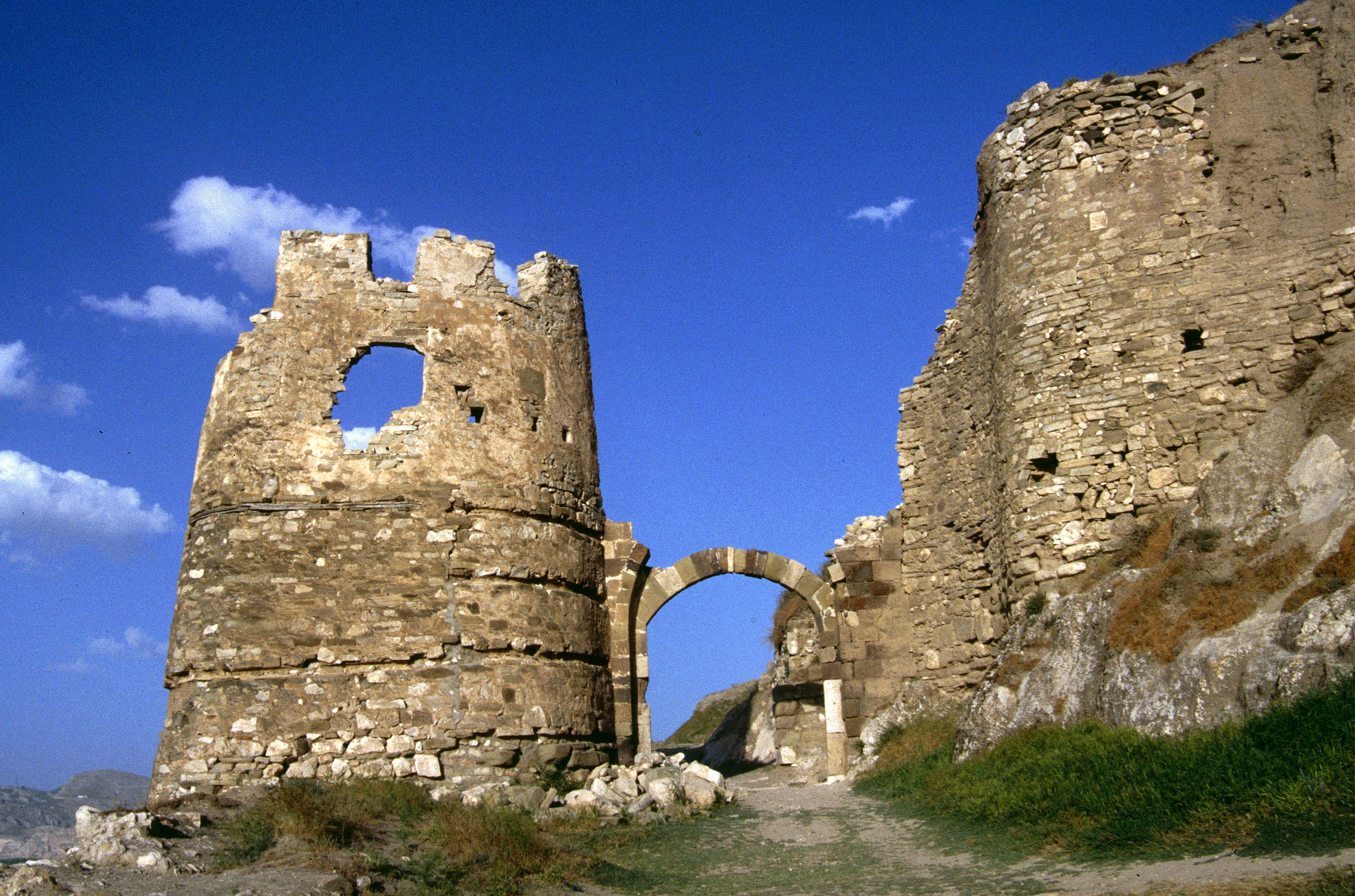
Ruins of the citadel in Tushpa

Urartian cities were established around religious centers near freshwater sources. Written sources confirm that cities were planned systematically, with an average area ranging from 50 to 200 hectares. Defensive walls, reinforced with towers, defined the city's borders. From these towers, walls extended inward, dividing the urban space into districts. This design made it easier to defend the city during invasions or isolate rebellious districts if necessary.

The central area of the city, often located on a hill, was designated for the citadel, palace, and temple, which dominated the cityscape. These structures served as political and administrative hubs, further protected by additional walls and moats.

Urban districts featured dense construction intersected by narrow streets. Houses typically had one, two, or three stories, with windows opening onto internal courtyards, following Mesopotamian architectural traditions. Parts of the urban space were allocated for workshops, storage facilities, production sites, recreational areas, and cemeteries located just outside the city walls.

The principal city of Urartu during the 9th–7th centuries BCE was Tushpa, located near Lake Van. The city was dominated by a heavily fortified citadel built on the nearly inaccessible Van Rock. Archaeological excavations have revealed the ruins of a temple dedicated to Ḫaldi on the slopes and chambers and crypts carved into the rock for royal purposes.

The city was constructed on multiple levels, connected by staircases and surrounded by walls. The walls of homes were painted red and blue. At the western base of Van Rock, the ruins of a harbor were discovered, and a 70-kilometer canal supplied the city with drinking water. Several monumental fortresses have been identified within a 10-kilometer radius of Tushpa.

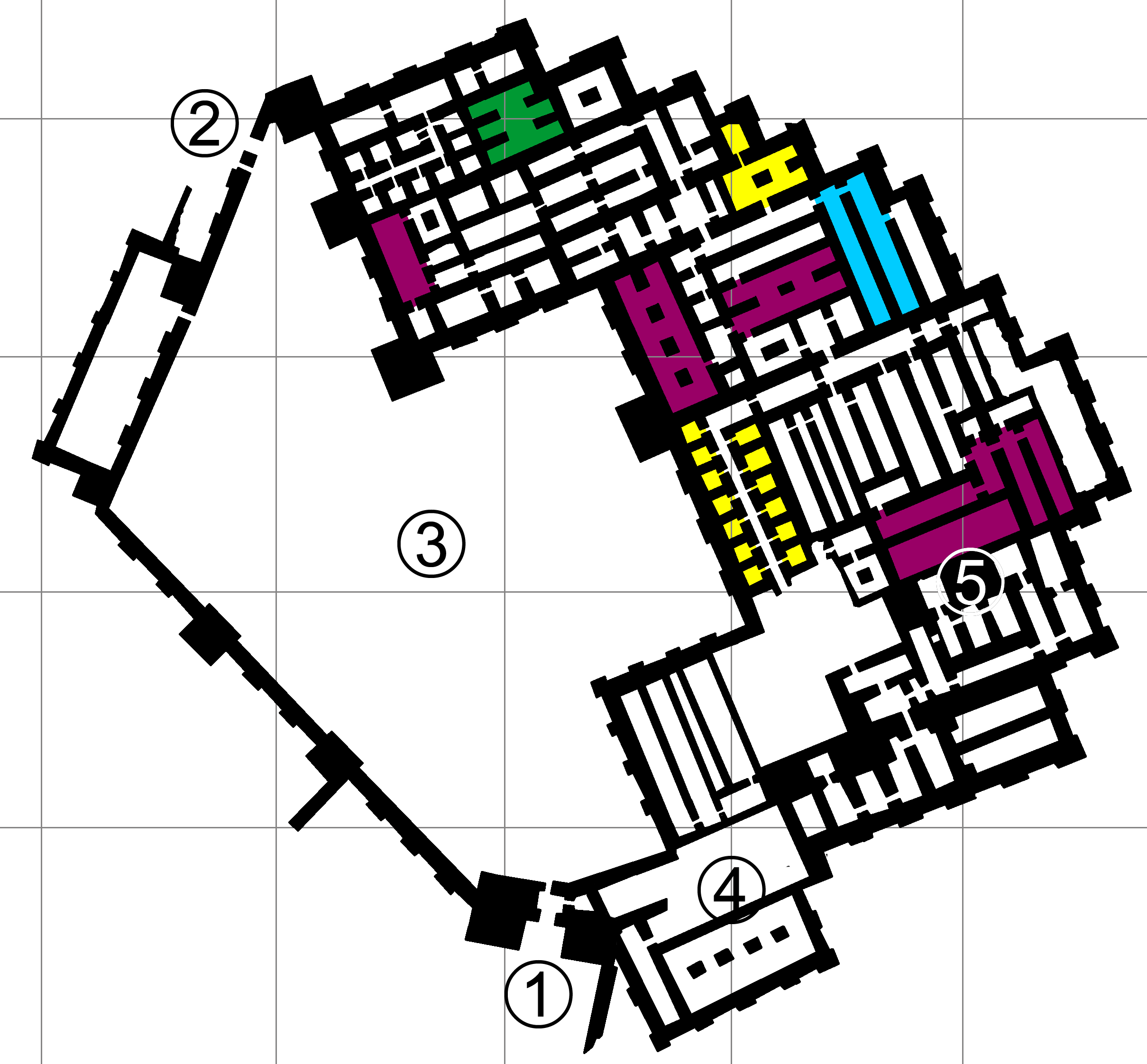
Palace complex in the Teishebaini citadel (1 – gate, 2 – forts, 3 and 4 – courtyards, 5 – storage buildings)

The best-studied Urartian city is Teishebaini, located on the hill of Karmir Blur. It was built according to a plan, with a network of main streets and secondary blind alleys. Like other Urartian cities, its center was occupied by the citadel and the king’s palace. Villas and elaborate houses for soldiers and officials surrounded the citadel, while poorer residents lived on the outskirts near the city walls.

Argištiḫinili was distinct among Urartian cities for its location on a low hill, which lacked monumental defensive structures. To ensure protection, walls were built around the hill using typical Urartian techniques: basalt foundations with mud-brick walls reinforced by buttresses and massive towers.

The city was rectangular, measuring 5 × 2 kilometers, and controlled an area of approximately 1,000 hectares, including structures on nearby hills. It was protected by two massive citadels on its western and eastern ends, with canals running along the city walls to supply water.

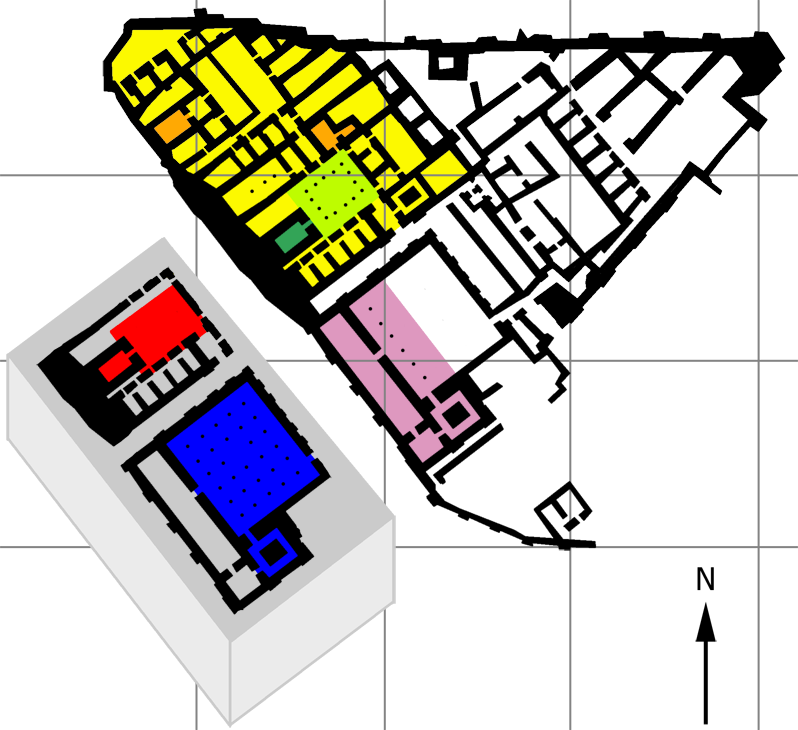
Erebuni Fortress palace peristyle Susi temple Jar Rooms Chaldean temple

The fortress-city of Erebuni was constructed primarily for military purposes. Unlike other Urartian cities, its citadel was not integrated into the urban layout. Instead, the fortress complex was surrounded by walls forming a triangular shape.

== Citadels ==
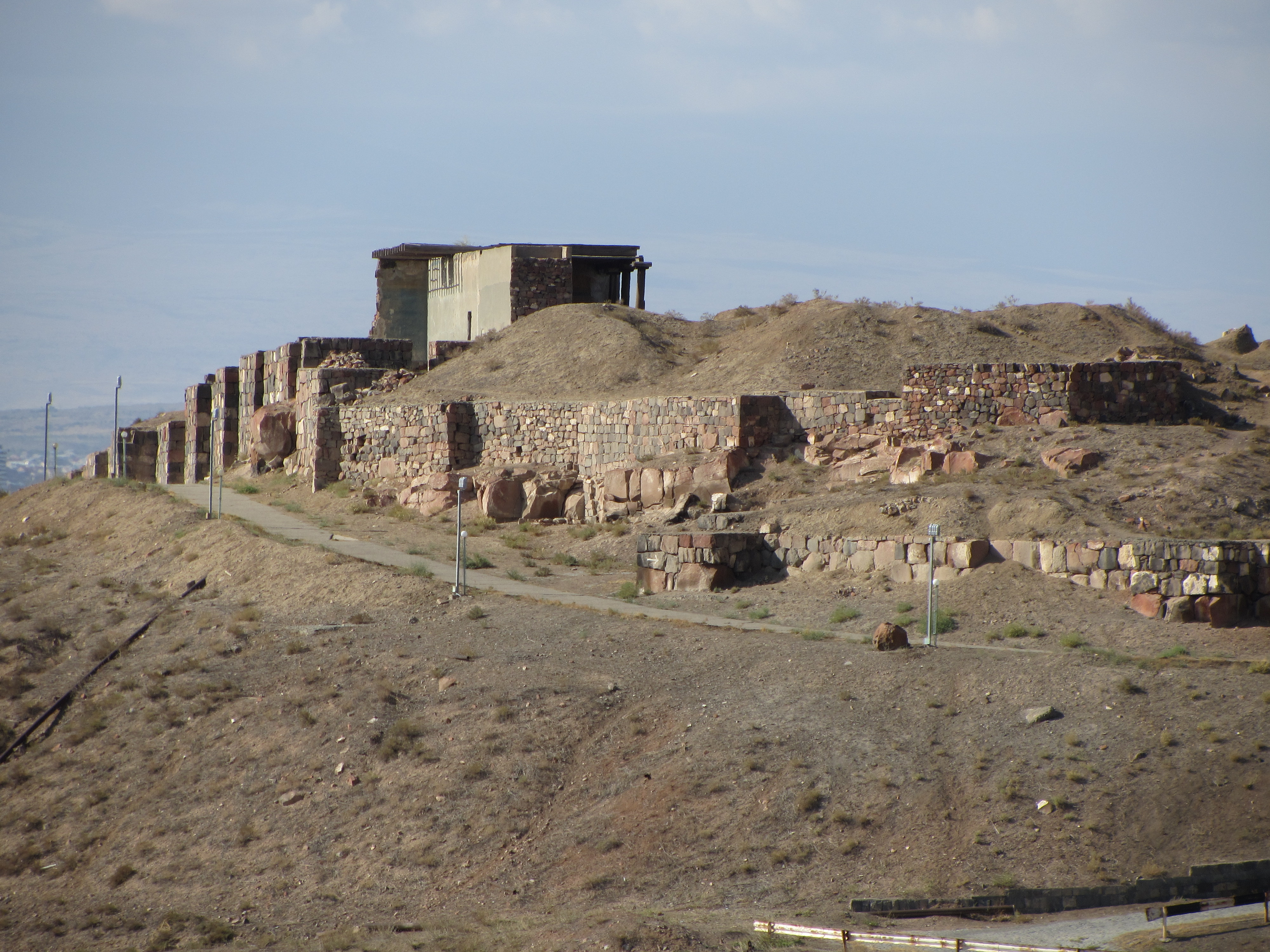
Ruins of Erebuni

The citadels were the centers of economic and political life in Urartian cities. They housed the ruler's palace, administrative buildings, and food storage facilities. These structures were fortified with walls, towers, gates, and moats filled with water. Citadels were typically built on hillsides, giving them a terraced design. Two types of Urartian citadels are well known: Erebuni and Teishebaini.

The best-preserved Urartian citadel is Erebuni, constructed in 782 BCE. The citadel housed a palace complex divided into various sections, including an official space, a throne room, an audience hall, private chambers, storage buildings, and rooms for soldiers, guards, and palace staff. Entrances to these areas were located around courtyards, which provided light to the rooms. One of the courtyards also contained the temple of Ḫaldi, with a portico featuring 12 columns before its entrance. The walls of the palace were decorated with paintings.

The primary difference between Teishebaini and Erebuni was their purpose. While Erebuni was originally a military fortress, Teishebaini functioned as an economic hub, storing food supplies. This influenced the design and layout of its buildings. The fortress structures ranged from one to two stories, with the upper floors used for residences and temples. Instead of courtyards, the spaces between buildings were arranged with corridors, which also served as storage and workshop areas for grain and wine. Courtyards were positioned in front of building facades.

== Temples ==
Urartu was inhabited by various tribes, which is why several types of temples existed in its territory. Common architectural features of these temples included their small size and their construction based on square or rectangular plans (with entrances on the longer or shorter sides). Three types of Urartian temples are represented by the Chaldean temple and the Susi temple in Erebuni, as well as the temple in Altıntepe:

- The Chaldean temple in Erebuni combines the sacred architectural traditions of Mesopotamia and Syria. Its entrance was adorned with a colonnaded portico, resembling the northern Syrian Bit-hilani. Inside the temple, there was a longitudinal cella, followed by a room with an exit leading to a square tower. The lower part of the tower was reinforced with a podium, resembling Mesopotamian ziggurats. The floor was laid with multicolored small tiles. The walls of the temple were decorated with paintings, stylistically referring to Assyrian art.
- The Susi temple in Erebuni resembled a megaron in form. It was built on a rectangular plan with an entrance on the shorter side. Its base was a pedestal. The temple courtyard was supported by columns. The pediment of the temple protruded forward. The walls were decorated with paintings and gold and bronze shields. Statues of sacred animals stood in front of the portals. This type of Urartian temple also includes the one destroyed in 714 BCE by Sargon II in Musasir, which is known from a relief at Dur-Sharrukin.
- The temple in Altıntepe has no analogs in the sacred architecture of the ancient Near East. It was built on a square plan. Its form was probably similar to monumental towers.
Temples

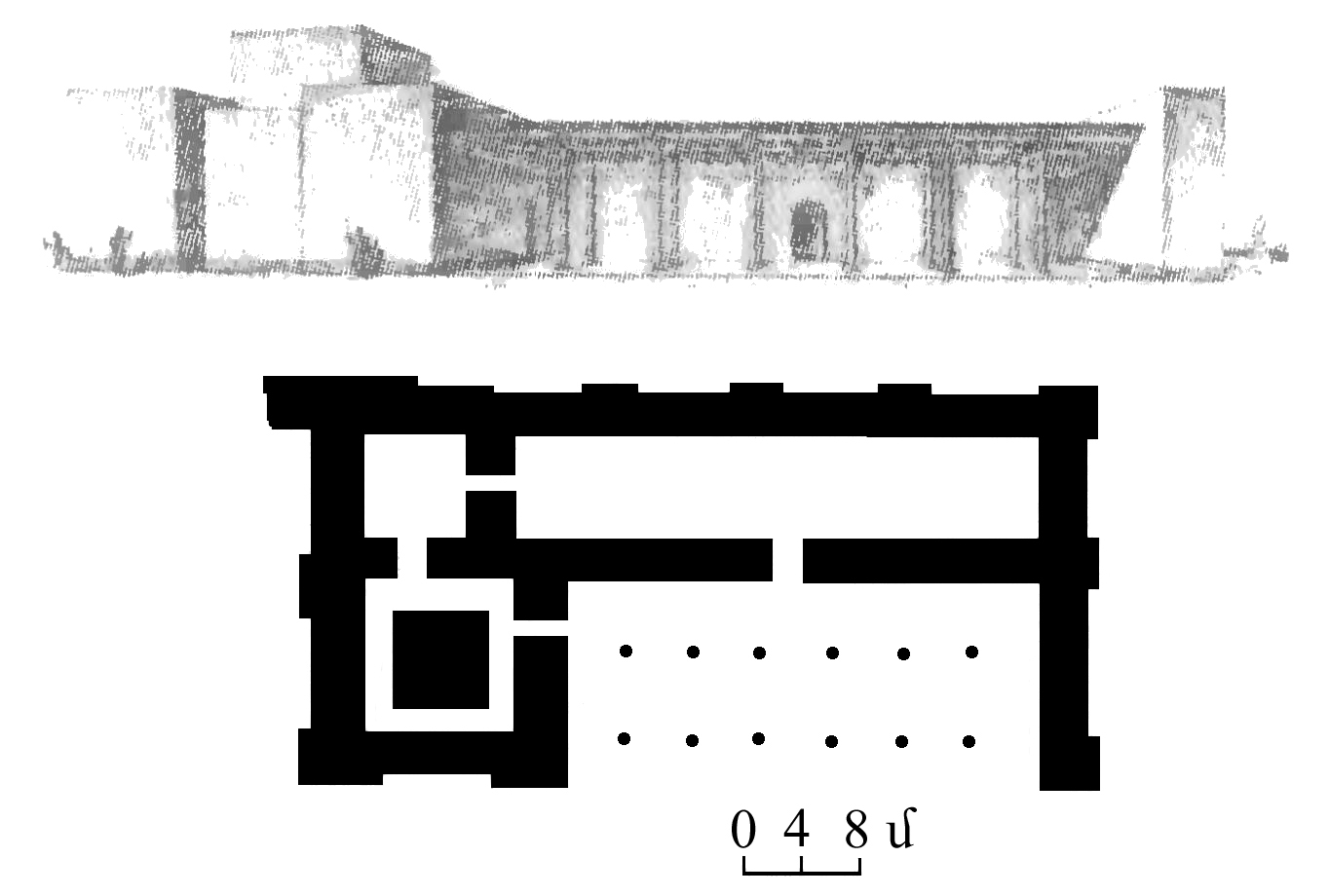
Plan and reconstruction of the Chaldean temple in Erebuni

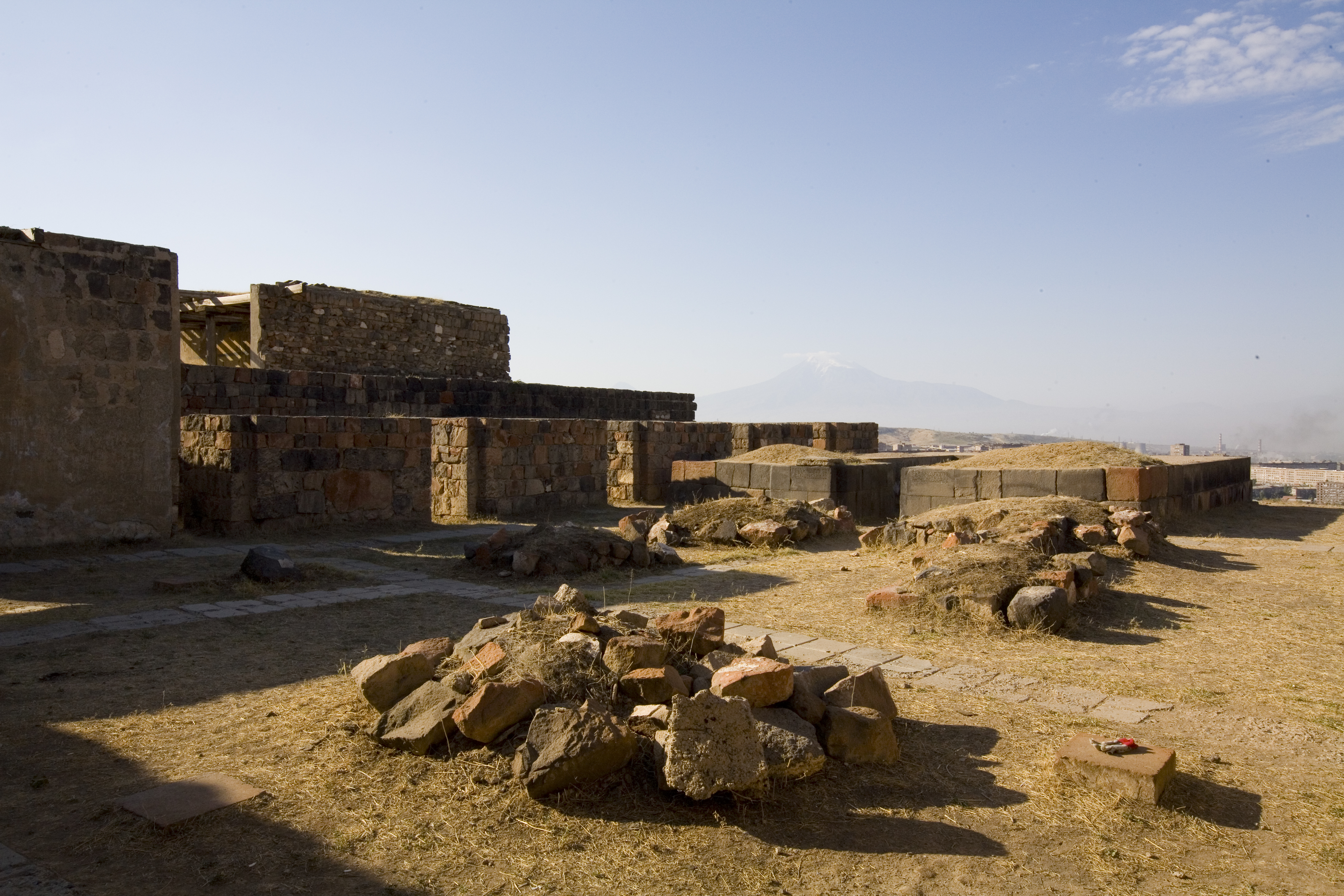
Ruins of the Susi temple in Erebuni

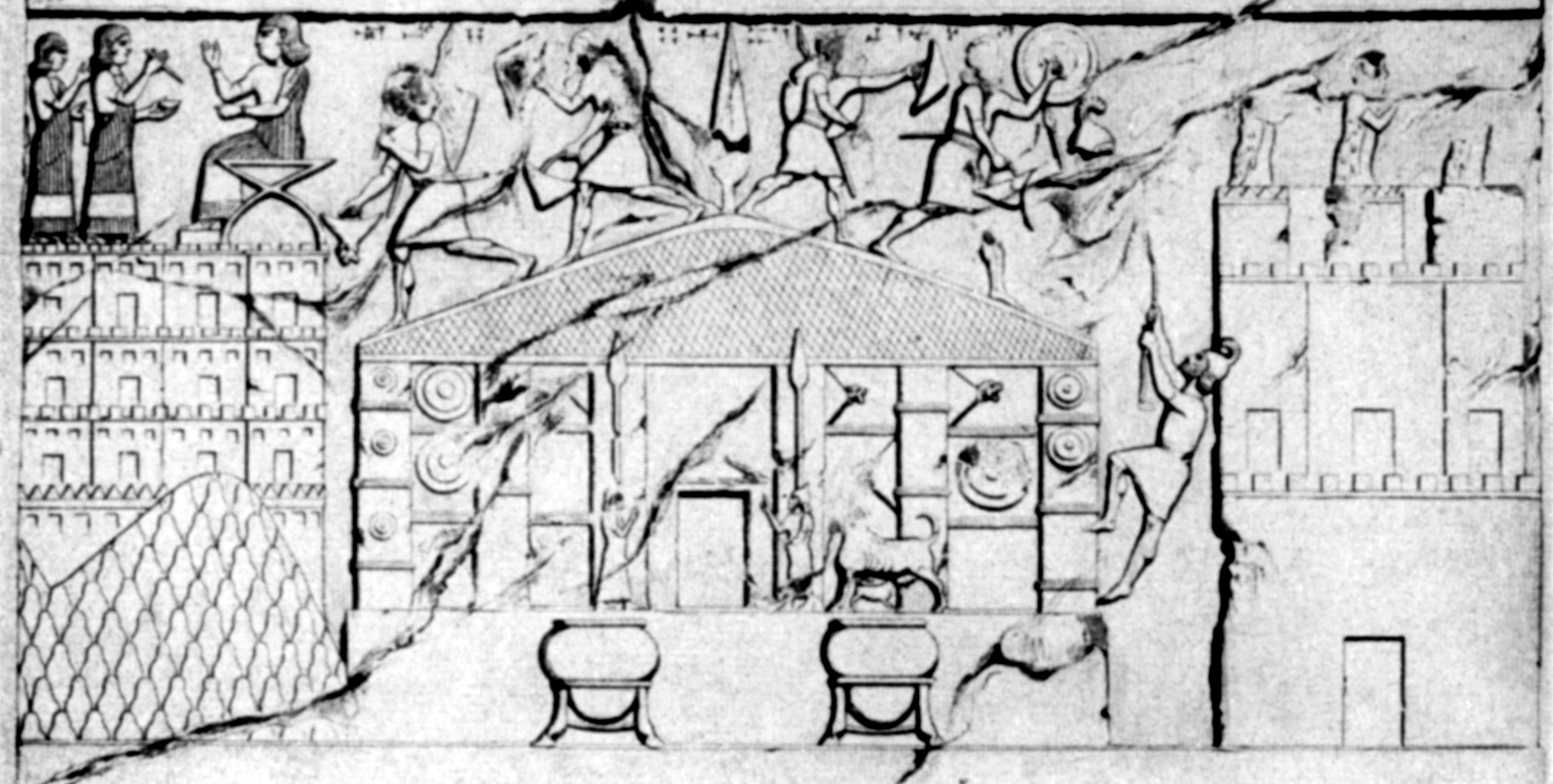
Relief of Dur-Sharrukin with the appearance of the temple in Musasir

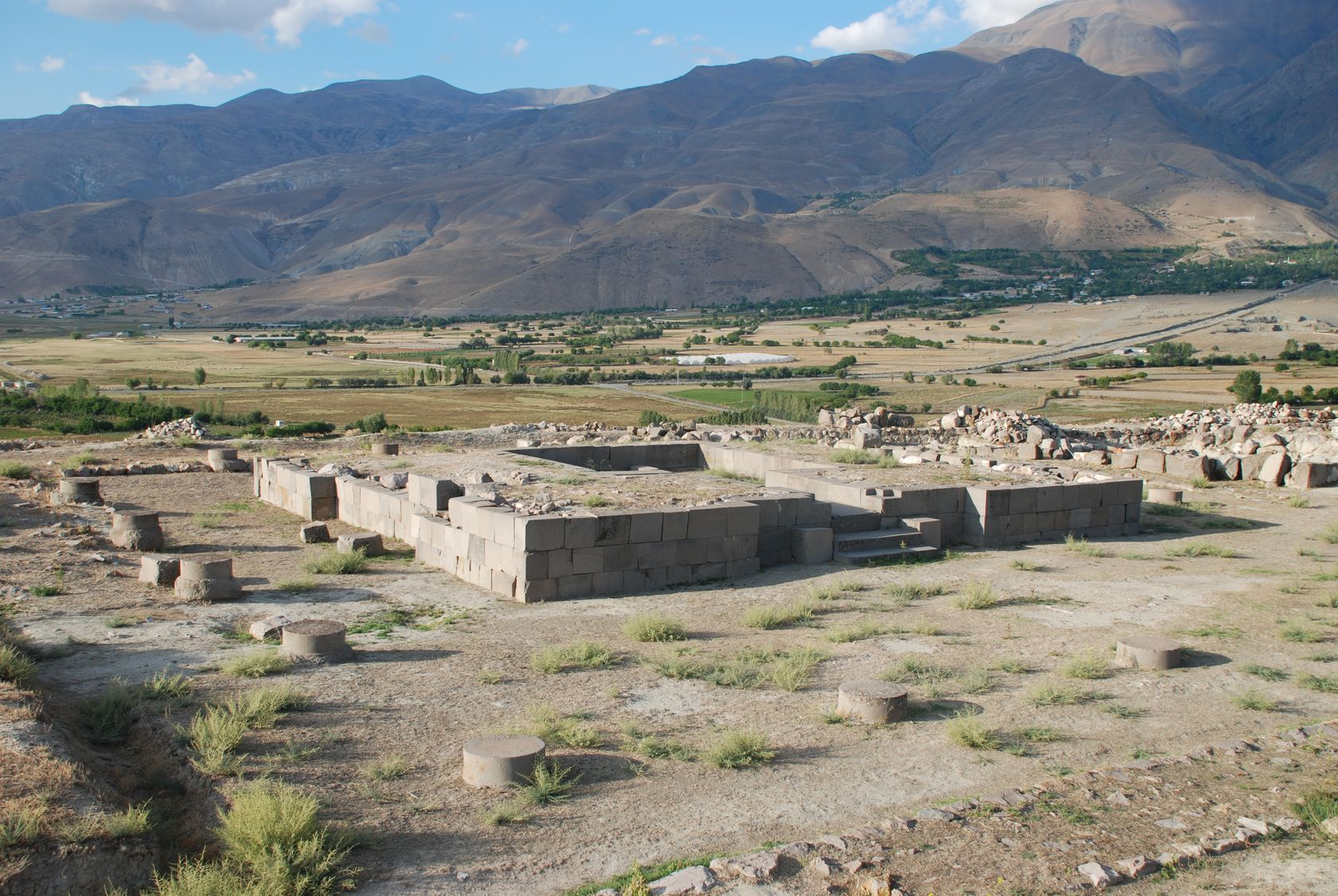
Ruins of the temple in Altıntepe

== Houses ==
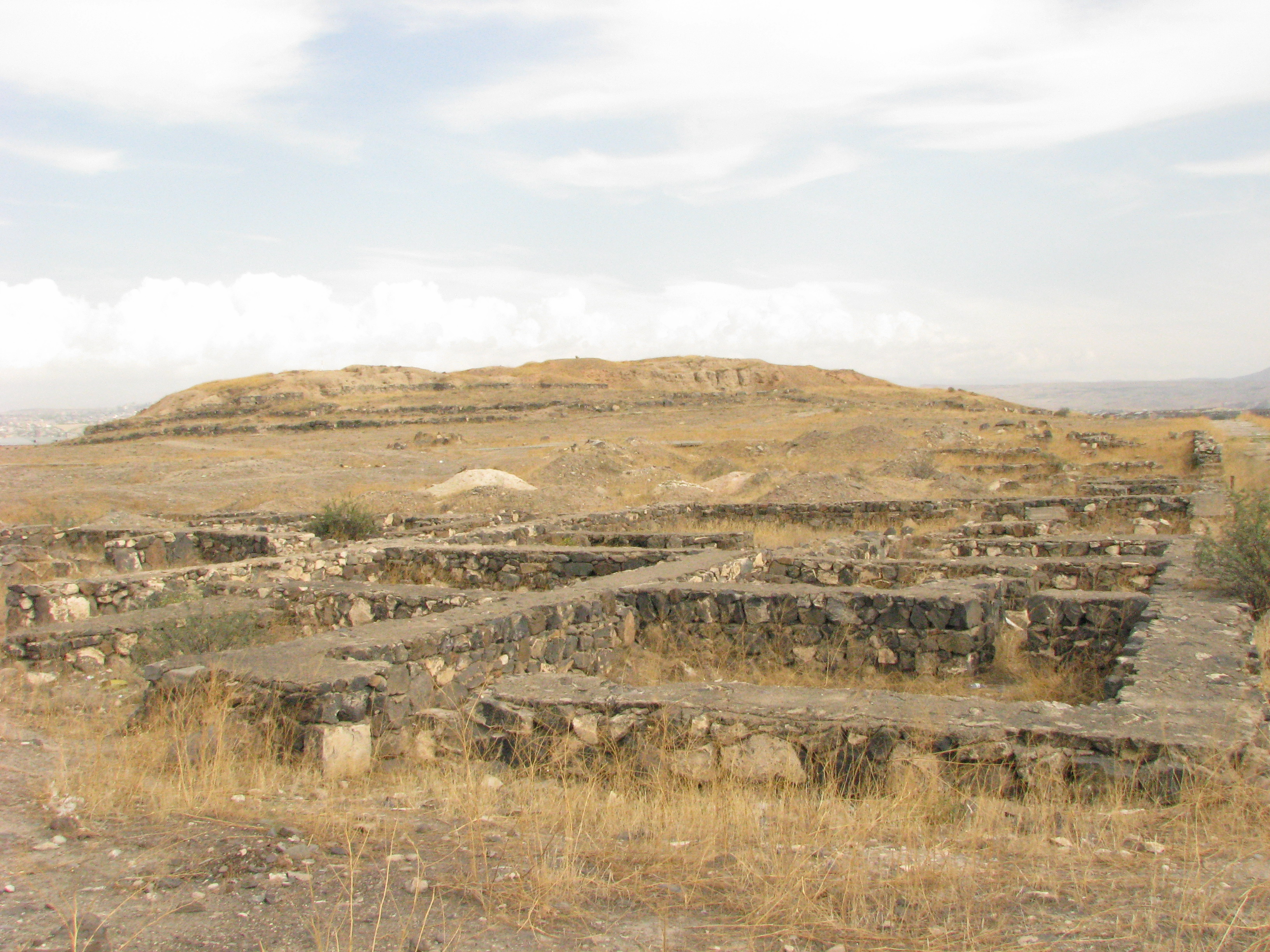
Remains of urban buildings in Teishebaini

Urartian houses were built on a rectangular plan. Three types of houses are known:

- A house consisting of two or three rooms, arranged around a centrally located courtyard. This type of house typically had an area of around 100 m². The courtyard occupied half of the house's space and was partially covered. The roof was supported by wooden columns. The courtyard was used for placing a hearth, a water storage tank, and keeping domestic animals.
- A more elaborate house, likely inhabited by officials, with an area of about 550 m². The courtyard of this type of house was slightly smaller, square, and uncovered, with covered colonnaded porticos built around it. The living spaces in the house were heated by portable stoves.
- Houses resembling Greek megarons with porticos. These houses had covered rooms, in which hearths were maintained permanently. The roof was supported by two wooden columns. The entrance to the utility space was located from the side of the courtyard. The courtyard was covered and surrounded by a wall.

== Carved caves ==
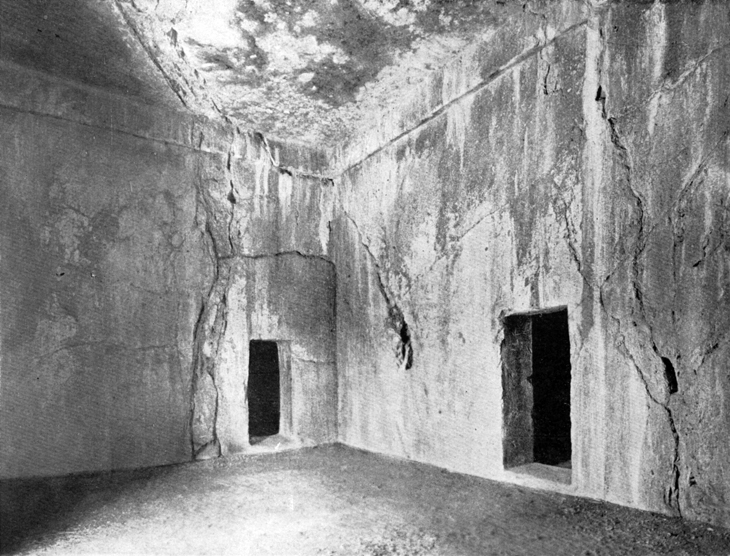
Hall carved in rock

Due to the location of Urartu, a large portion of its architecture consists of rooms carved into rock. In the Armenian highlands, carved terraces, stairs, and squares are commonly found. Initially, it was believed that this type of construction had a cultic significance, in addition to its practical use. In literature, the high stairs (reaching up to 1 meter) were referred to as "irrational". However, the study of fortresses revealed that walls were supported on these stairs. The cultic aspect was found in the niches near the stairs, where religious texts or records of events were placed. These niches were called "gates of the god". Among the most famous are the "Mher's doors". A square for religious rituals was situated in front of the niche.

Several groups of artificial caves carved into the Van Rock have survived, located on the southern and southwestern sides. These are small, interconnected grottos leading to a hall. In the first cave from the entrance, there was a stone bench from which the Lake Van could be seen. The walls of the caves feature niches, where slabs with cuneiform inscriptions were placed, and likely, lighting was installed.

== Funerary art ==
Funerary art is represented by two types of tombs:

- Rock-cut tombs carved into Van Rock (Tushpa).
- Chamber tombs, consisting of one to three rooms made of large stone blocks and covered with slabs or vaulted ceilings. This type of tomb was discovered in Altıntepe.

== Bibliography ==
- Belli, van O. (1989). The Capital of Urartu. Eastern Anatolia.
- Mierzejewski, A. (1983). Sztuka starożytnego Wschodu [Art of the Ancient East] (in Polish). Vol. 2. ISBN 83-221-0072-8.
- Piotrovsky, B. (1959). Vanskoe tsarstvo (Urartu) Ванское царство (Урарту) [The Kingdom of Van (Urartu)] (in Russian).
