= Statuette of God Teisheba =

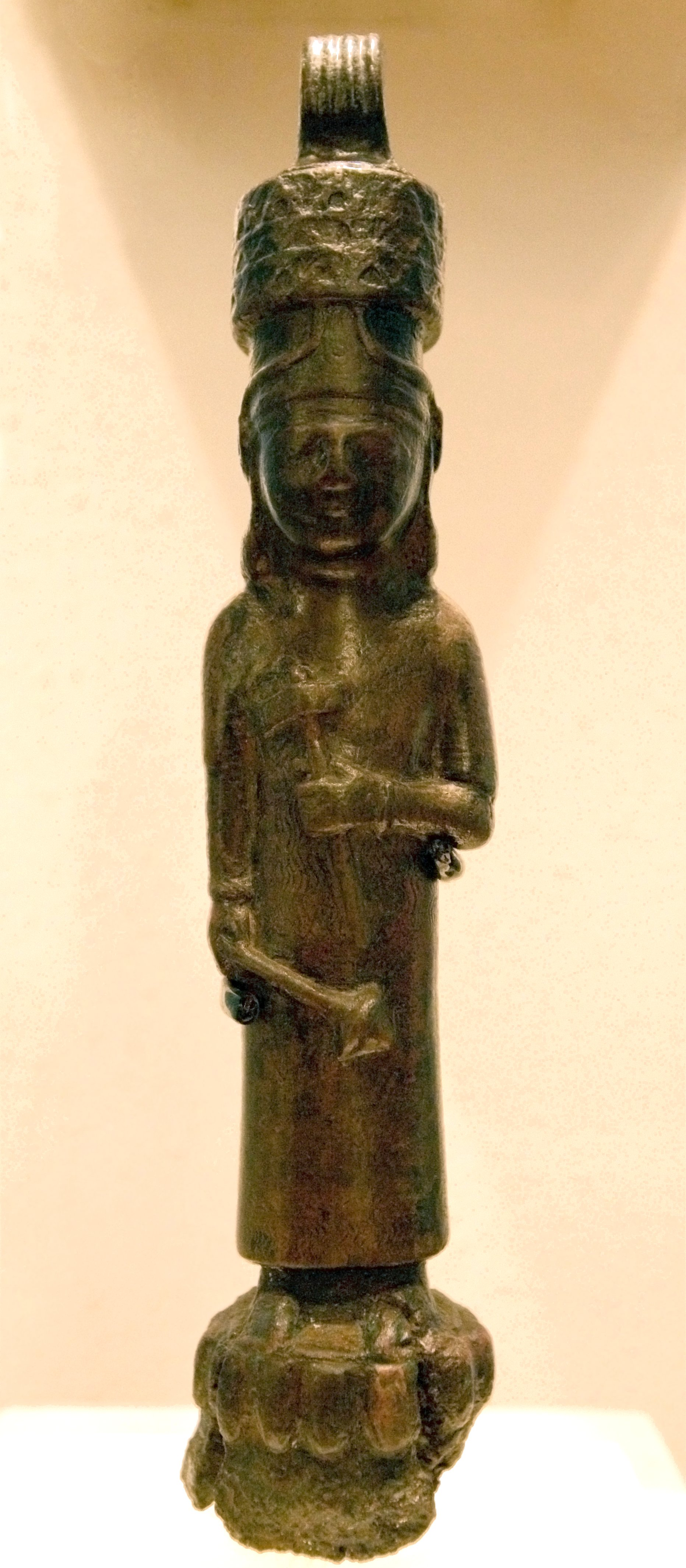
- Year: 800-700 B.C.
- Type: bronze
- Location: History Museum of Armenia; Yerevan

The Statuette of God Teisheba is an Urartian (Kingdom of Van) bronze statuette made in the 8-7th century BC, found near Teishebaini (Karmir Blur) in 1941, depicting the Araratian (Urartian) god of storms and thunder Teisheba. It is at the History Museum of Armenia, in Yerevan. The statuette was found by Hripsime Janpoladyan who was the wife of the head of expedition Boris Piotrovsky.

== Description ==
The statuette looks like a young man who in full height stands on a foliate base. The man wears a gown on which there are characteristic ornaments of Urartian period: a quadrangle with a rosette in the centre, a belt on his waist, a fringed band over his shoulder. Hair of God Teisheba go down over his shoulders, on head he has a high headgear covered with horns, which represent the bull, the symbol of Teisheba. On the left hand of the statuette there is a battle-axe, and on the right hand a disc-shaped mace, his left arm is folded in the elbow.

== See also ==
- Teishebaini
- Art of Urartu
- History Museum of Armenia
