= Art of Urartu =

Art from Urartu (Ararat)

The art of Urartu refers to a historical and regional type of art from Urartu (Ararat), the ancient state of Western Asia which existed in the period from the 13th to the 6th centuries BC in the Armenian Highland. The art of Urartu was strongly influenced by nearby Assyria, the most prominent state of that period in the region. It peaked around the 8th century BC but was mostly looted, scattered and destroyed with the fall of Urartu about a century later.

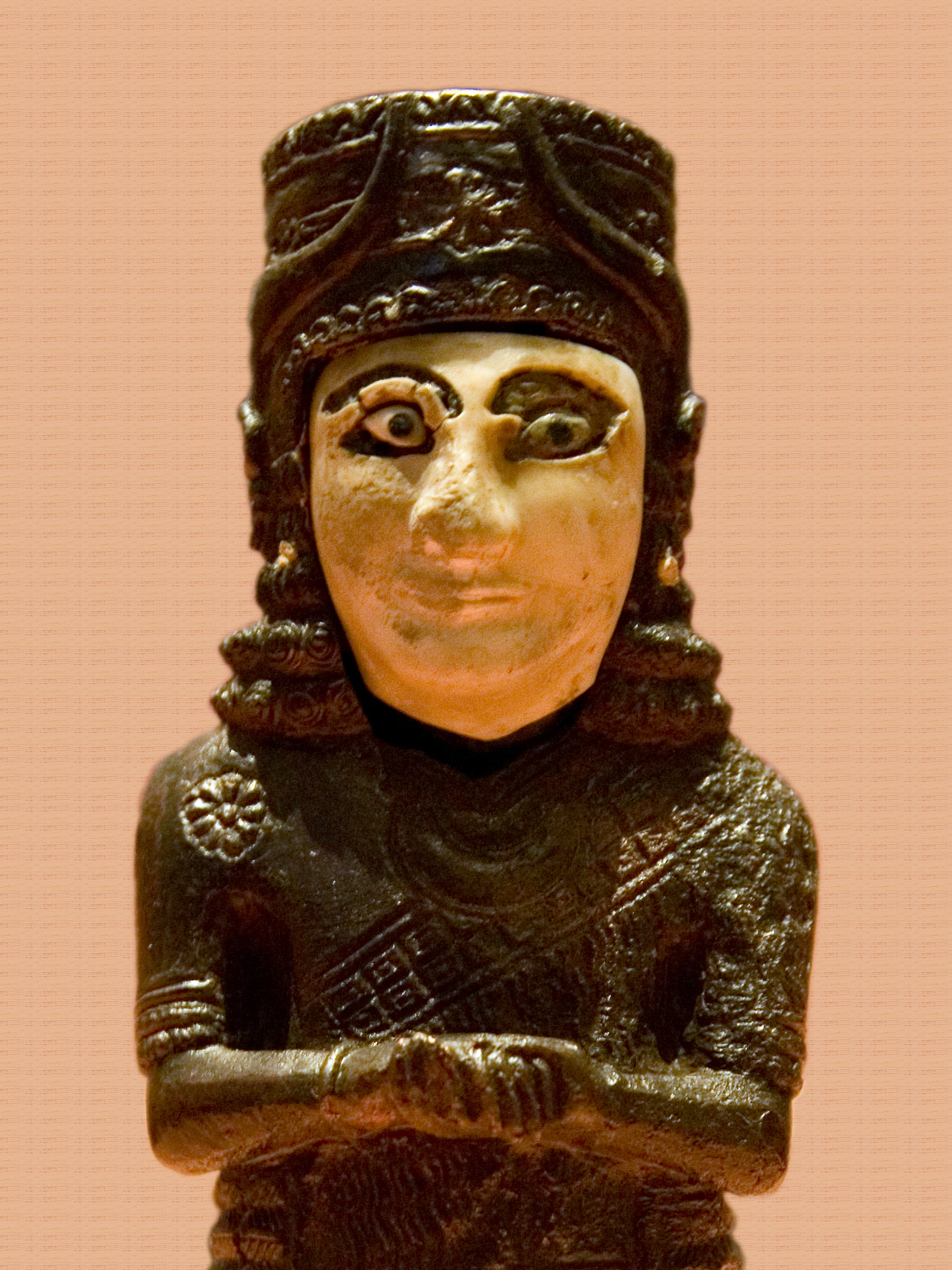
Detail of a bronze throne of Urartian kings

== Overview ==
Urartian art was heavily influenced by neighboring Assyria, and despite the obvious stylistic differences was long considered a branch of Assyrian art. Urartian art is characterized by 1) a style following its canon more rigorously than in other cultures of the Ancient East, 2) preference for ornaments rather than representational scenes of life, and 3) the practice of copying old examples instead of improving them. As a result, the style of Urartian craftsmen remained unchanged for several centuries and was gradually simplified. Urartian art was relatively poorly characterized until the 1950s, when major archeological work was started at the ancient Urartian cities Teishebaini and Erebuni and many Urartian cuneiform tablets were deciphered.

== Bronze statuettes ==
Although Urartian masters were capable of producing large bronze statue, not even fragments of any have been found so far. Literature mentions that Assyrians, while looting the city of Musasir, removed a bronze statue of King Argishti I weighing 60 talents (about 1,8 tons). Small bronze objects of art were exclusively made for the king's palace and are divided into three groups: throne decorations, ornaments on copper cauldrons and, rarely, statuettes of Urartian gods.

=== Throne decorations ===
Between 1877 and 1885, local treasure hunters sold a few small bronze fragments to several European museums. These fragments later turned out to be parts of one and the same Urartian king's throne. They were cast in bronze into a mold and then gilded by wrapping in thin gold sheets. The fragments are currently preserved in the British Museum, Hermitage, Louvre, Metropolitan Museum of Art and in private collections in Paris and Brussels.

Bronze parts of one throne (Hermitage, Russia). The sketch of an item from the British Museum on the right reveals that these two items are identical. All figures have protrusions and hooks for horizontal or vertical attachment, as well as coded signs, probably identifying location on the throne.

=== Boiler decorations ===
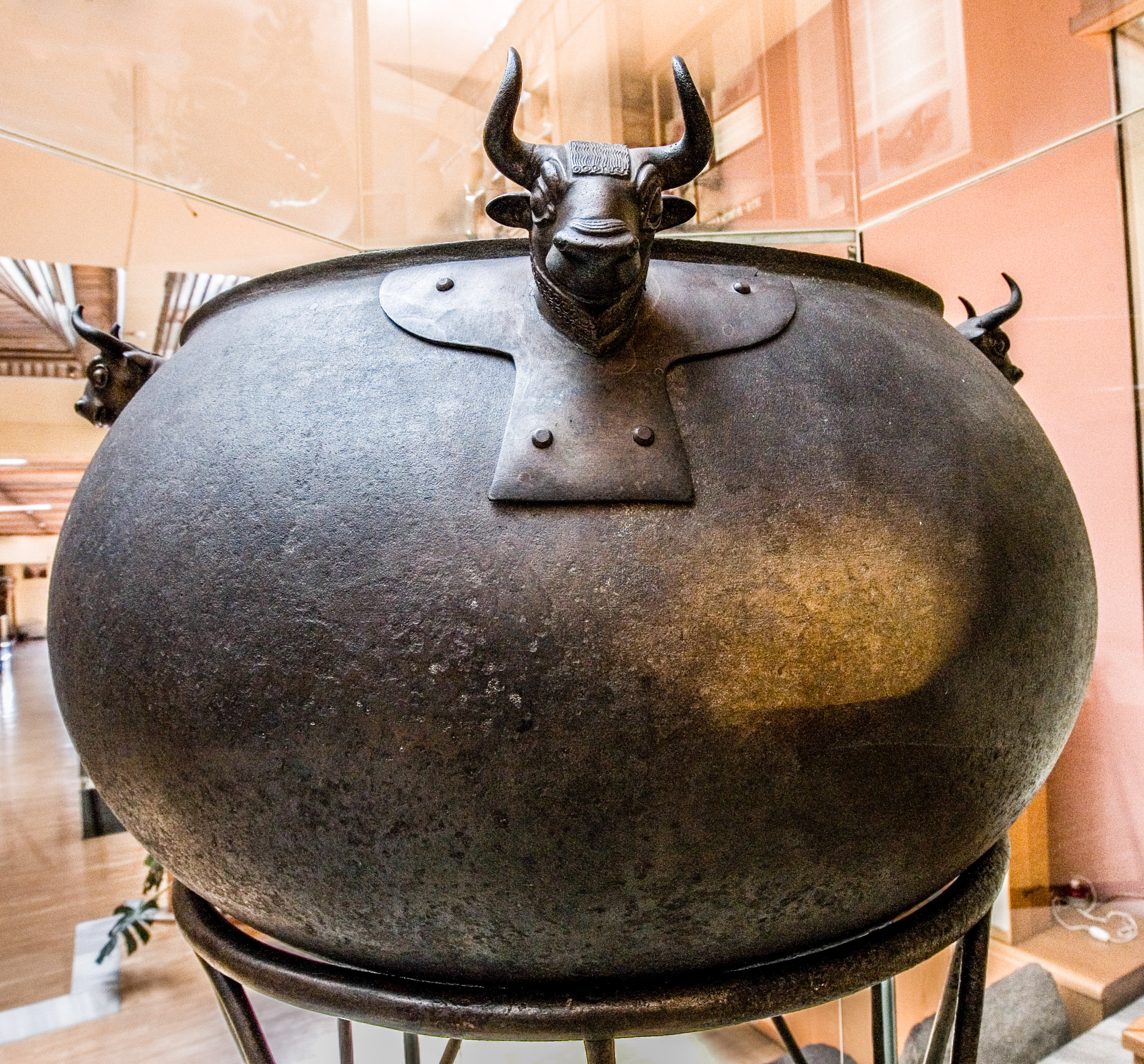
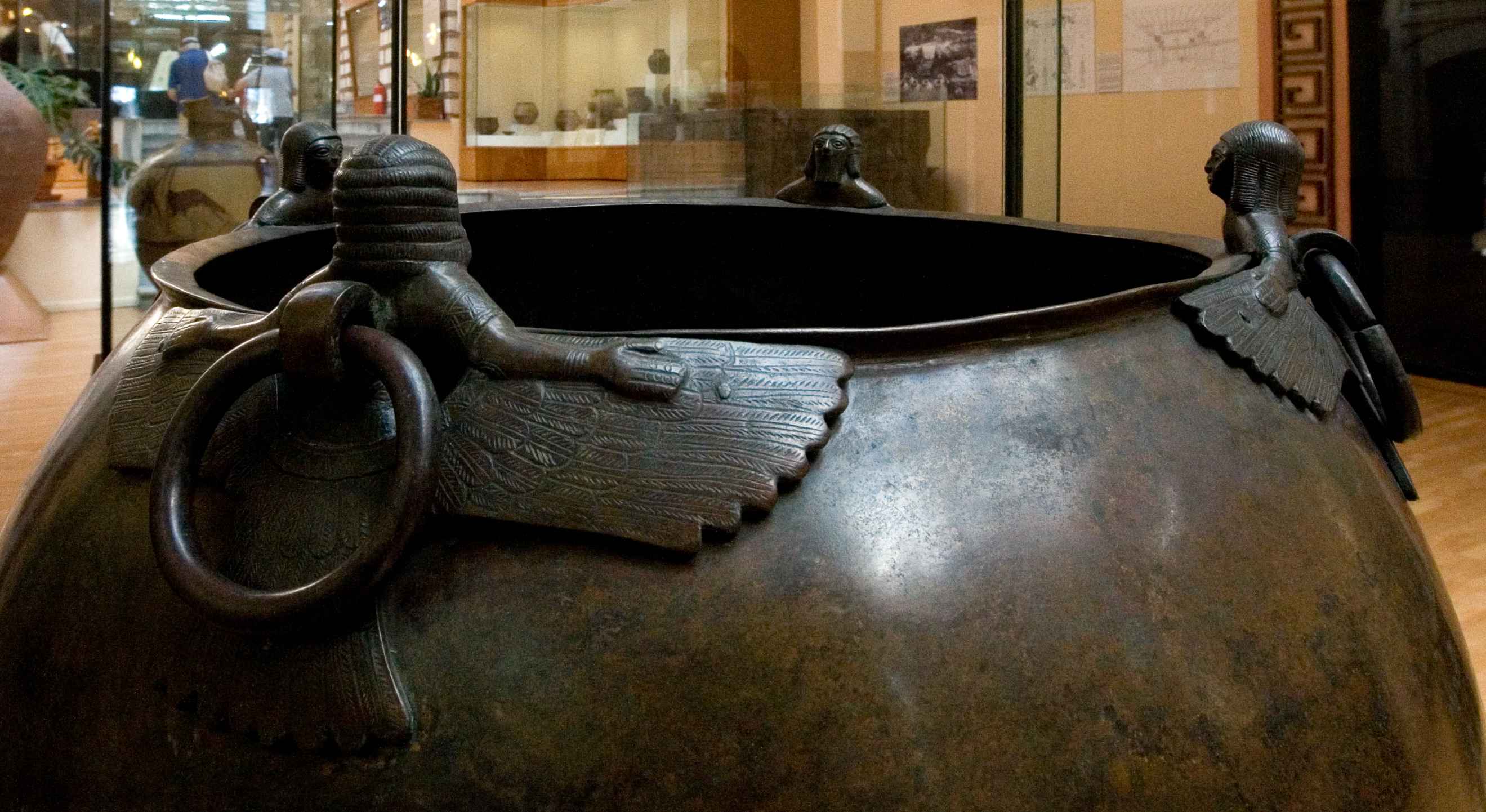
Left: cauldron with bull heads found in Van, Armenia. Right: cauldron from a Phrygian city with figures assigned to the god Shivini.

Cauldron decorations are the best-preserved objects of Urartian bronze and therefore were used in the early 20th century to identify the Urartian style in art. The decorated copper cauldrons were apparently used for ritual ceremonies. For example, the annals of the Assyrian king Sargon II mention a bronze vessel filled with wine being part of the sacrifice to the god Ḫaldi.

The bronze statuettes were cast separately and then attached to the cauldron. They include bull heads and winged deities, possibly the god Shivini and his wife Tushpuea. The technique of casting bronze ornaments spread from Urartu to the neighboring countries, in particular to Phrygia, and then to Europe. Urartian cauldron ornaments have been found in Rhodes, Athens, Boeotia, Delphi, Olympia and in Etruscan tombs. Some Urartian bronze figures were removed from the boilers and re-used by other nations to decorate new vessels.

=== Statuettes of gods ===
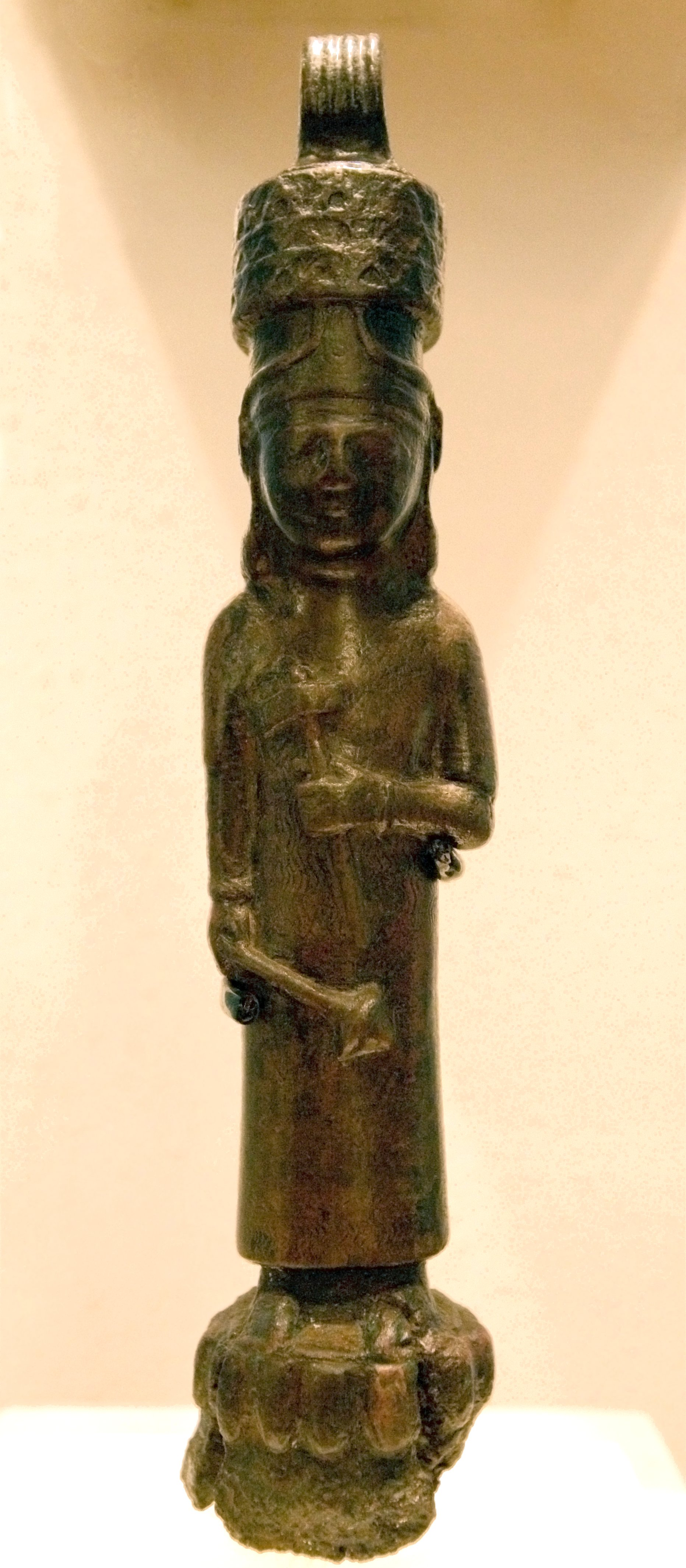
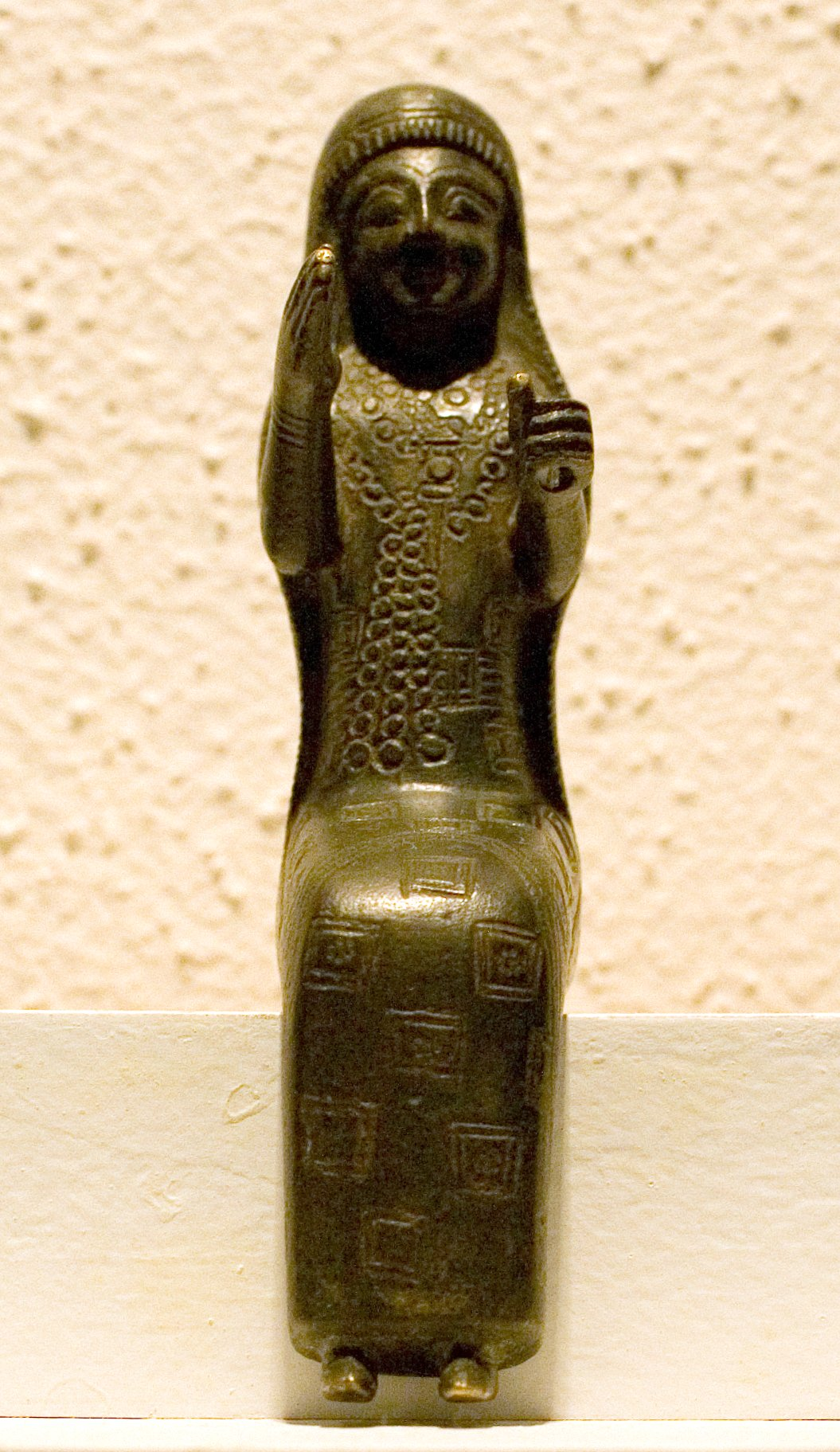
Left: weather god Teisheba, found in 1941 during the excavations at Karmir Blur, in the ruins of the Urartian fortress of Teishebaini named in honor of the god. Right: goddess Arubani, wife of Ḫaldi.

Only three bronze statuettes depicting Urartian deities have been preserved. One, possibly of the god Ḫaldi, is stored in the British Museum, and two others are in the History Museum of Armenia (copy in the Erebuni Museum, Yerevan, see image).

== Weapons ==
=== Helmets ===
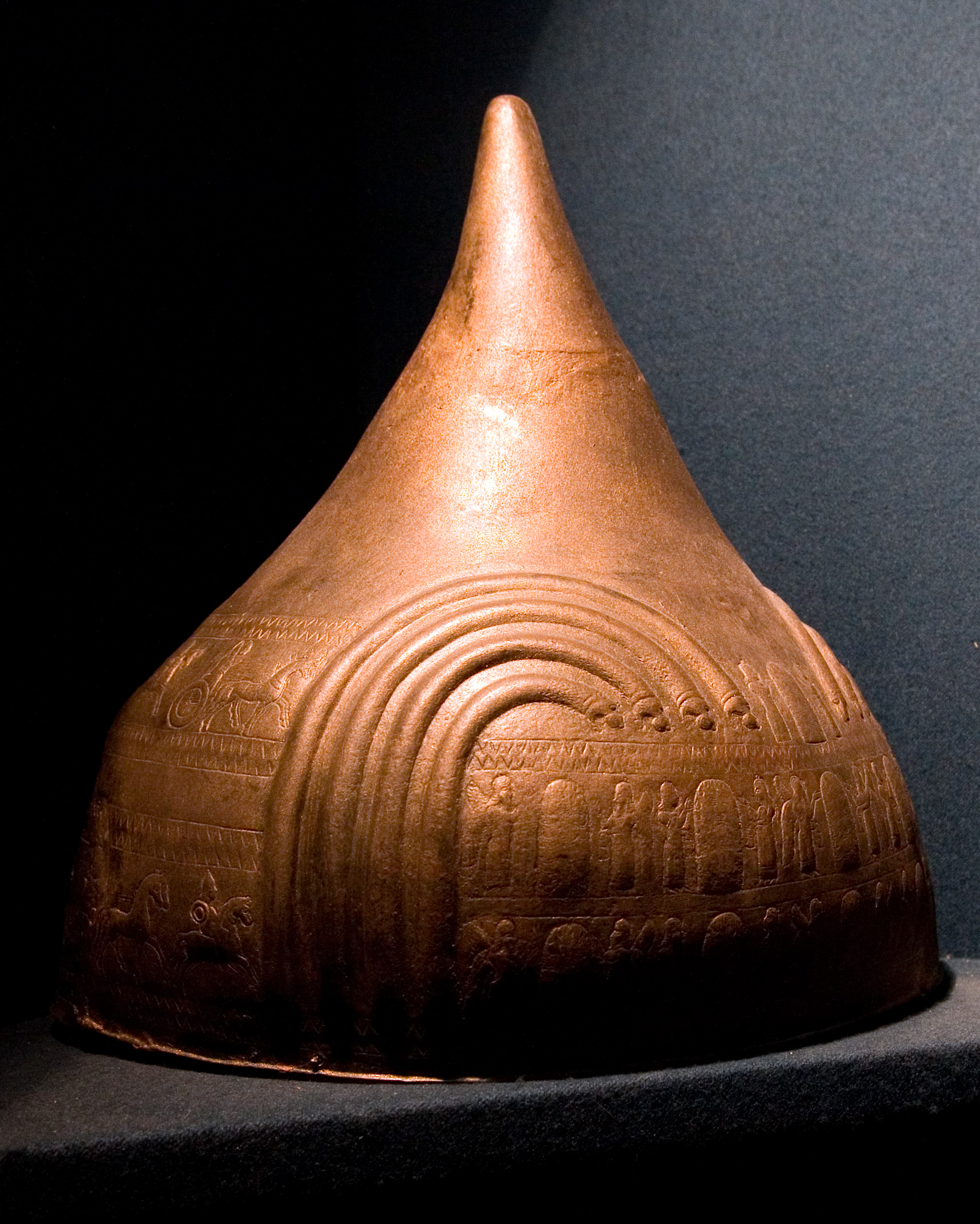
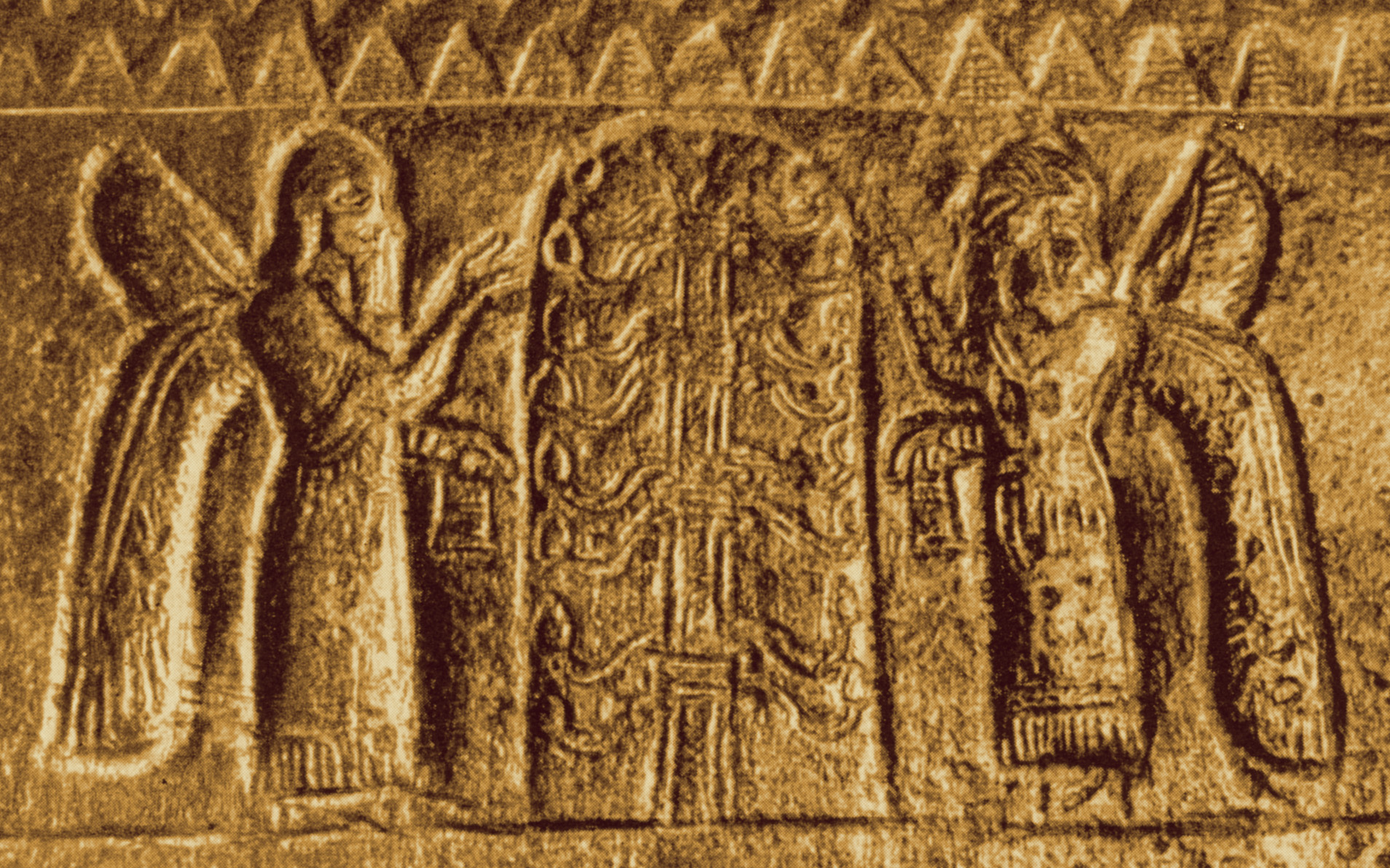
Helmet of the Urartu king Sarduri II found at Karmir Blur near Teishebaini. The inscription on the helmet reads: "Sarduri, son of Argishti dedicates this helmet to God Ḫaldi". Right: detail of the helmet depicting the tree of life

Numerous Urartian helmets have been recovered, more than 20 alone during the excavations of Teishebaini. Royal ceremonial helmets did not differ in shape from simple combat helmets but contained engraved images.

=== Shields ===
A few decorative bronze Urartian shields have been found near Van (they are stored in the British Museum and Berlin museums) and 14 were excavated at Karmir Blur. They have diameters ranging between 70 and 100 cm and were not made for combat, as judged from the thinness of the metal and the character of the handles. All these shields contain concentric circles of lions and bulls which were designed so that no figure would appear upside down. The images were first stamped and then engraved with various instruments. The Assyrian king Sargon II described six golden Urartian shields, which were looted in Musasir, weighing 6.5 kg each. They have not been recovered thus far.

Bronze shields found at Karmir Blur near Teishebaini and their corresponding images.
Shield of Sarduri II. Cuneiform inscription on the edge reads: "Sarduri, son of Argishti dedicates this helmet to God Ḫaldi."	Shield of Argishti I. Cuneiform inscription on the edge reads: "Argishti, son of Menua, dedicates this helmet to God Ḫaldi."

=== Quivers ===
Only three royal Urartian quivers are known, all found during the excavations of Teishebaini. They are made of bronze and contain images of Urartian warriors.

Quiver owned by Sarduri II (Hermitage).
Top of the quiver of Sarduri II.
Quiver owned by Argishti I.	Top of the quiver of Sarduri II.

=== Belts ===
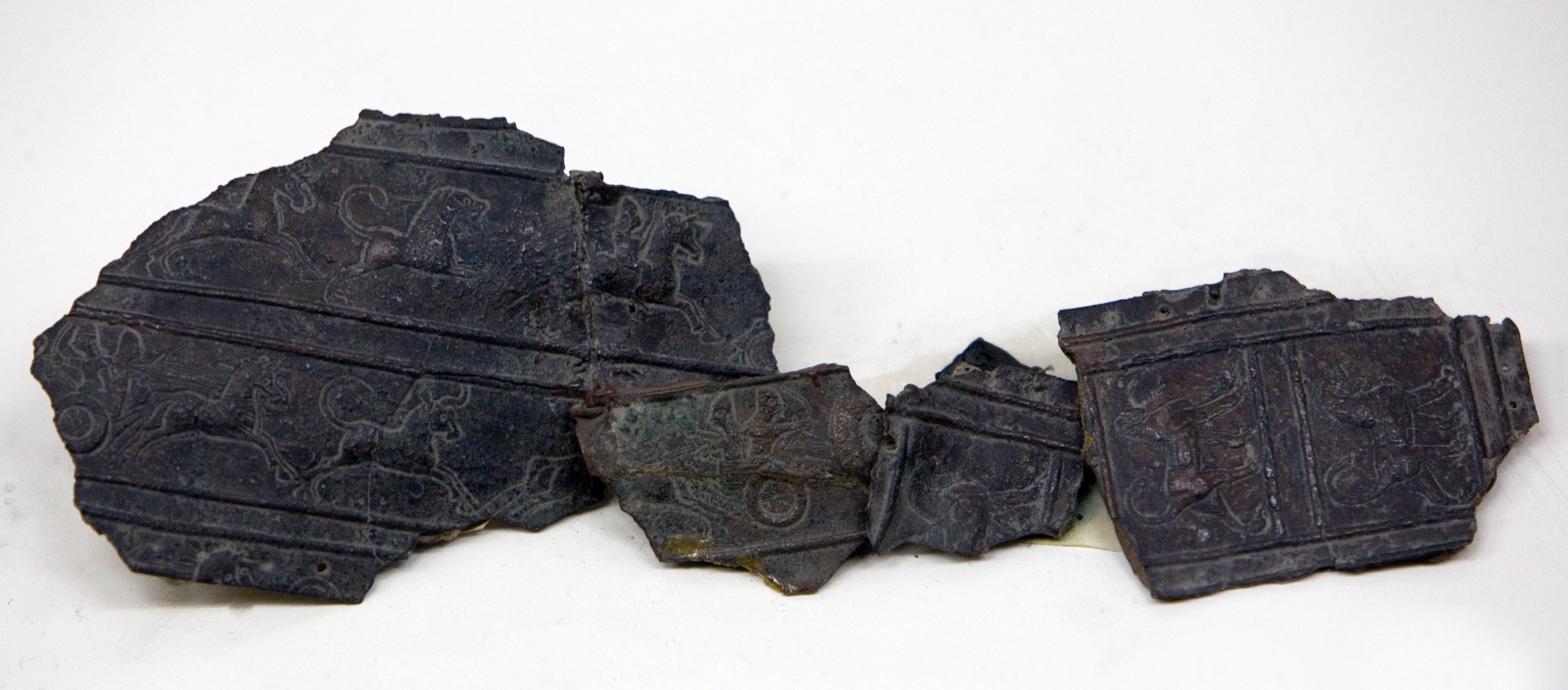
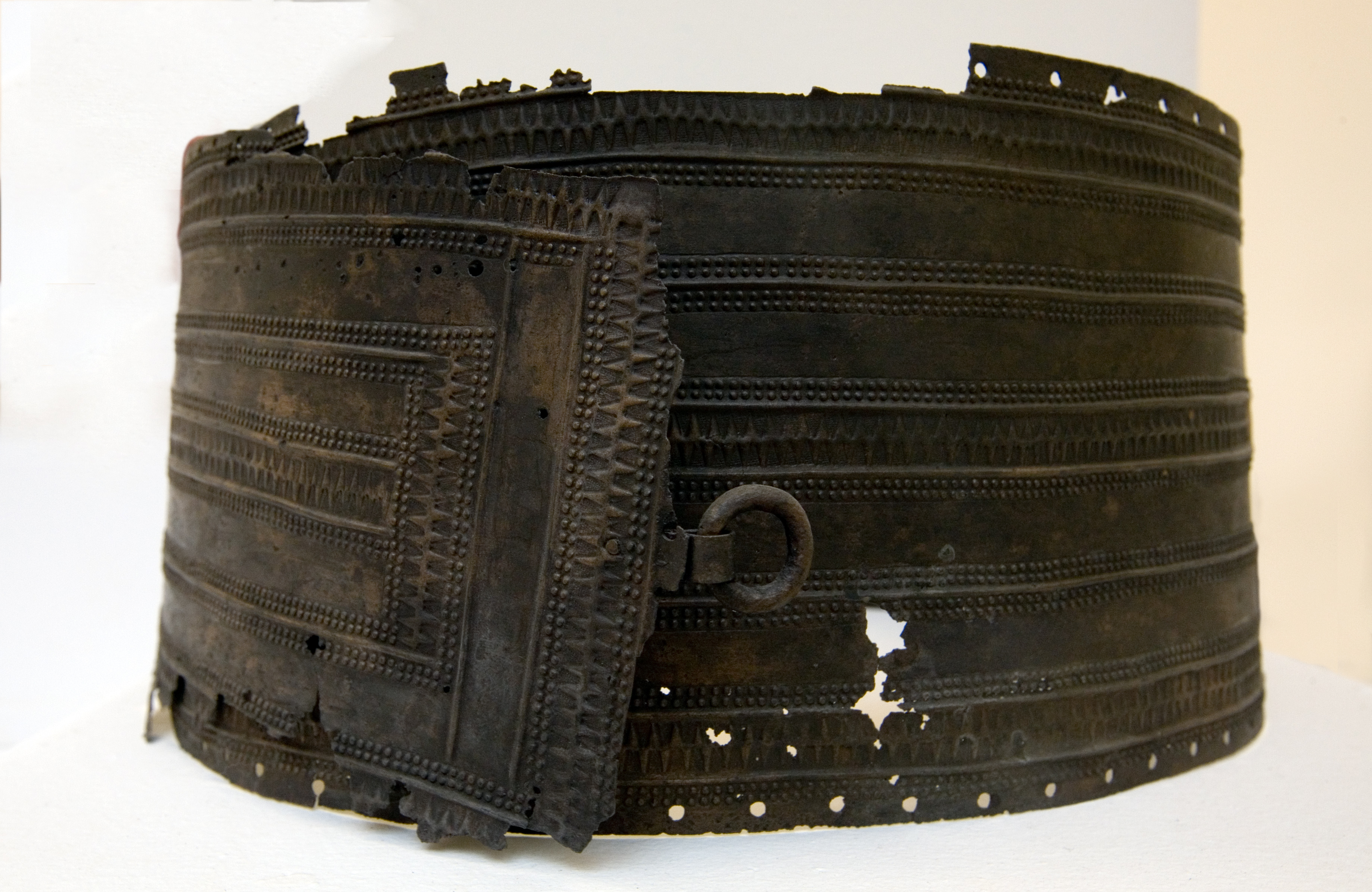
Protective belts of Urartian archers. Left: remains of an iron belt found at Arin Berd, Erebuni. Right: bronze belt found near Van.

Poorly preserved remains of Urartian mail of Argishti I were excavated at Teishebaini. But almost all bronze Urartian belts don't have a provenience: that is, they're likely loot and may be inauthentic.

=== Jewelry ===
Jewelry of Urartu had two gradations: ornaments made of precious metals and stones for the king and his family, and their simplified bronze versions used by the rich. Many jewelry items were also used as amulets. Annals of the Assyrian king Sargon II mention vast amounts of Urartian jewelry items made of silver and gold which were taken from Musasir in 714 BC. They are not preserved and some may have been melted by treasure hunters. The two largest recovered jewelry items are shown below. They are the pectoral decoration excavated at the late Urartian capital Rusahinili and the cover of the cauldron found at Teishebaini. Smaller items include golden pins, earrings, a bracelet and a few medallions. Jewelry was worn in Urartu by both men and women. Women's jewelry usually portrayed the Urartian goddess Arubani, wife of Ḫaldi – the supreme god of Urartu. Also common are Mesopotamian motifs such as tree of life and winged sun. More accessible jewelry included bronze bracelets and earrings and carnelian beads.

Women's silver jewelry with the image of God Ḫaldi on the throne and his wife Arubani. Berlin Museum.	Silver cauldron cover with a full-blown pomegranate on top, inscribed as property of King Argishti I.	Carnelian beads, purchased from treasure hunters near Van, Armenia.
Silver medallions and golden earrings (damaged by fire during the assault on Teishebaini), found at Karmir Blur.

=== Pottery and stone art ===
Contrary to expectations, very few stone reliefs and sculptures were found during excavations, although the reliefs of the Assyrian king Sargon II depicting the Urartian city of Musasir clearly show large statues. Only a few minor remnants of stone reliefs were discovered in Turkey: the rest were likely destroyed after the fall of Urartu. However, pottery items were found in large numbers.

Relief depicting Teisheba standing on a bull, found reused in the ruins of the fortress of Adiljevaz/Adilcevaz (Van Museum, Turkey)	Two stone boxes found at Karmir Blur. The right one depicts griffins and a winged sun.

Left to right: rhyton found at Karmir Blur. Rhyton shaped as the neck of an animal, found near the city of Van, stored in the Archaeological Museum of Istanbul. Glazed ritual vessel featuring bulls.

=== Wood and bone ===
A few art items made of bone were found, mostly broken to parts, such as the bone combs excavated near Teishebaini. The only preserved example of wooden art of Urartu is the horse which was attached to some larger wooden item.

Wood and bone
Left to right: candelabrum found at Rusahinili; the wooden inserts are modern, bone and bronze inserts are original. A leg of the same chandelier. Two bone plates featuring gods; the plates were decorations for other items and were found at Rusahinili. Wooden horse head found at Karmir Blur.

=== Frescoes ===
Colored frescoes in rather good condition were found in the ruins of the Urartian fortress of Erebuni. Unlike many other Urartian cities, Erebuni was not burnt but left without a fight and then abandoned; this helped preserve its murals.

Examples of murals from the fortress of Erebuni

=== Cylinder seals ===
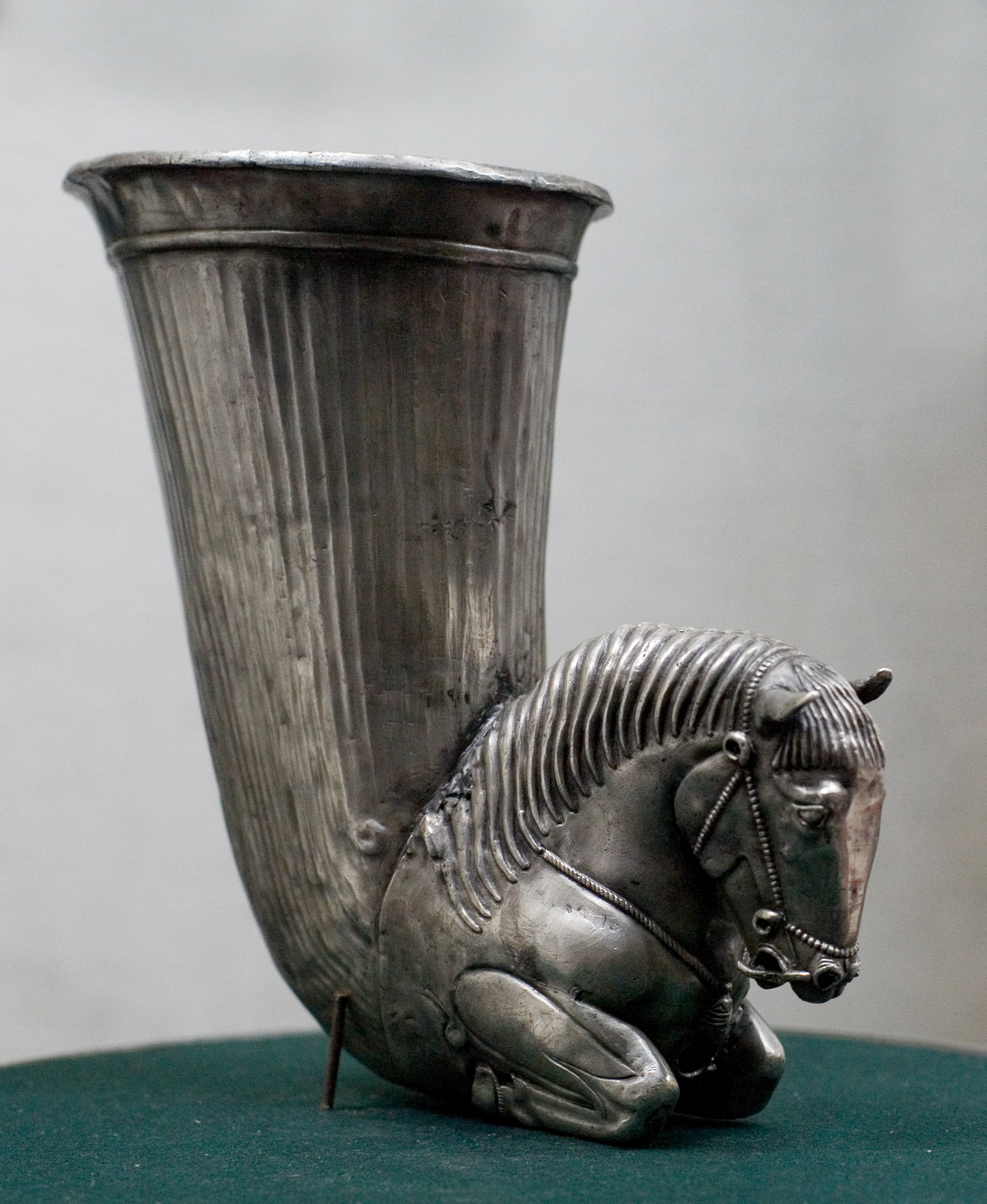
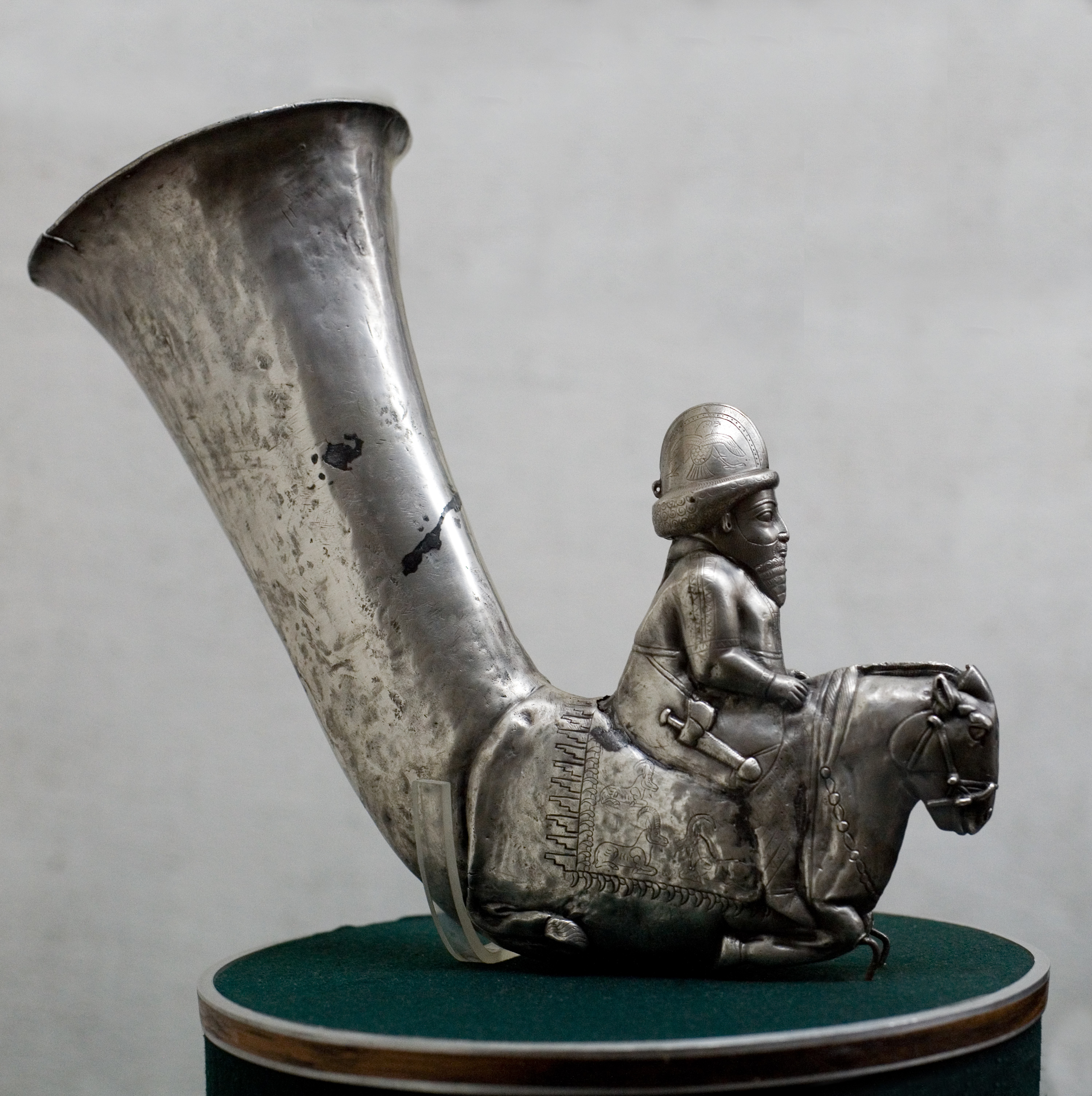
Silver rhytons of Achaemenid era found at Arin Berd hill. Their combining elements of eastern, Greek and Urartu art confirms the influence of Urartu art on the nearby countries.

Many features of Urartian art were preserved in the neighboring countries after the fall of Urartu in the 6th century BC. Observations by Boris Piotrovsky suggest that decoration and production techniques of Scythian belts and scabbards were borrowed from Urartu. The Urartian way of decorating cauldrons spread over the ancient world, and it is believed that Armenian art and that of southern Georgia were partly based on the Urartian traditions. Urartu used cylinder seals similar to those from other ancient states of the Ancient Middle East. They depicted the moon, stars, religious images and sometimes hunting scenes.

Reprints of Urartian cylinder seals found at Karmir Blur.

== Bibliography ==
- Mack Chahin (21 December 2001). The kingdom of Armenia: a history. Psychology Press. ISBN 978-0-7007-1452-0.
