= Shivini =

Urartian solar god

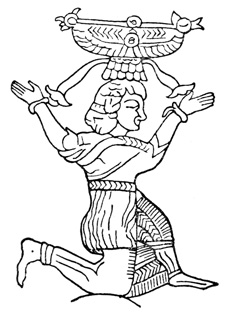
Shivini, a drawing based on an image on an object (a belt) from the History Museum of Armenia

Shivini (Urartian: 𒀭𒅆𒄿𒌑𒄿𒉌, romanized: ^{d}ši-i-u_{2}-i-ni), also known as Siuini, Artinis, Ardinis, was a solar god in the mythology of the Iron Age kingdom of Urartu in the Armenian Highlands. (Note: He was also called Šimigi by the Hurrians.) He is the third god in a triad with Khaldi and Theispas. The Assyrian god Shamash is a counterpart to Shivini. He was depicted as a man on his knees, holding up a solar disc. His wife was most likely a goddess called Tushpuea who is listed as the third goddess on the Mheri-Dur inscription.

Armen Petrosyan and other scholars argue that his name derives from a Hittite source, and is, therefore, of the same Indo-European origin as the names of Ancient Greek Zeus and Roman Jupiter.

== Gallery ==
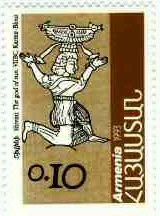
Armenian postage stamp, 1993

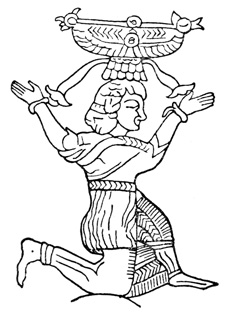
Shivini god

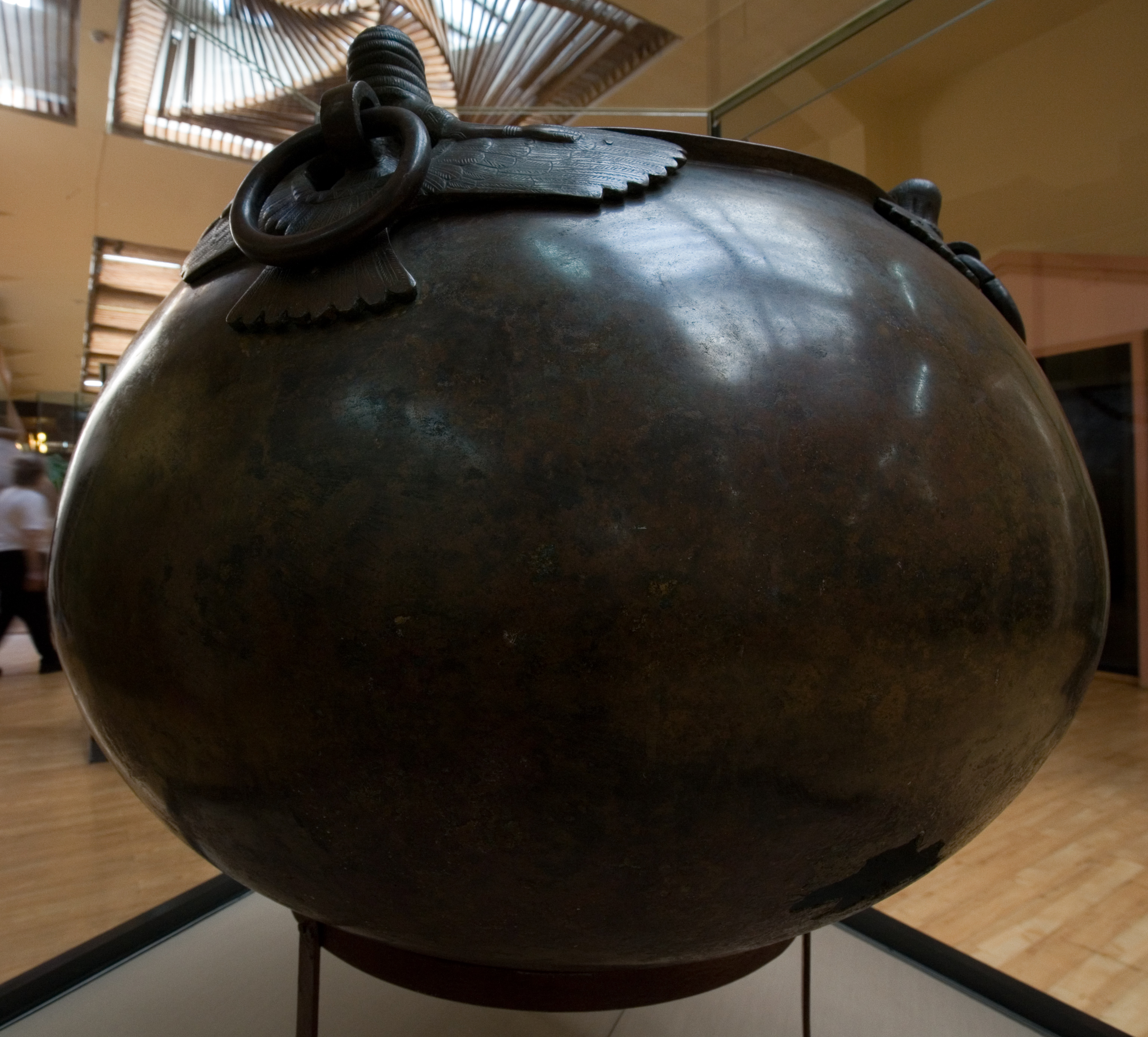
Shivini's bronze caldron

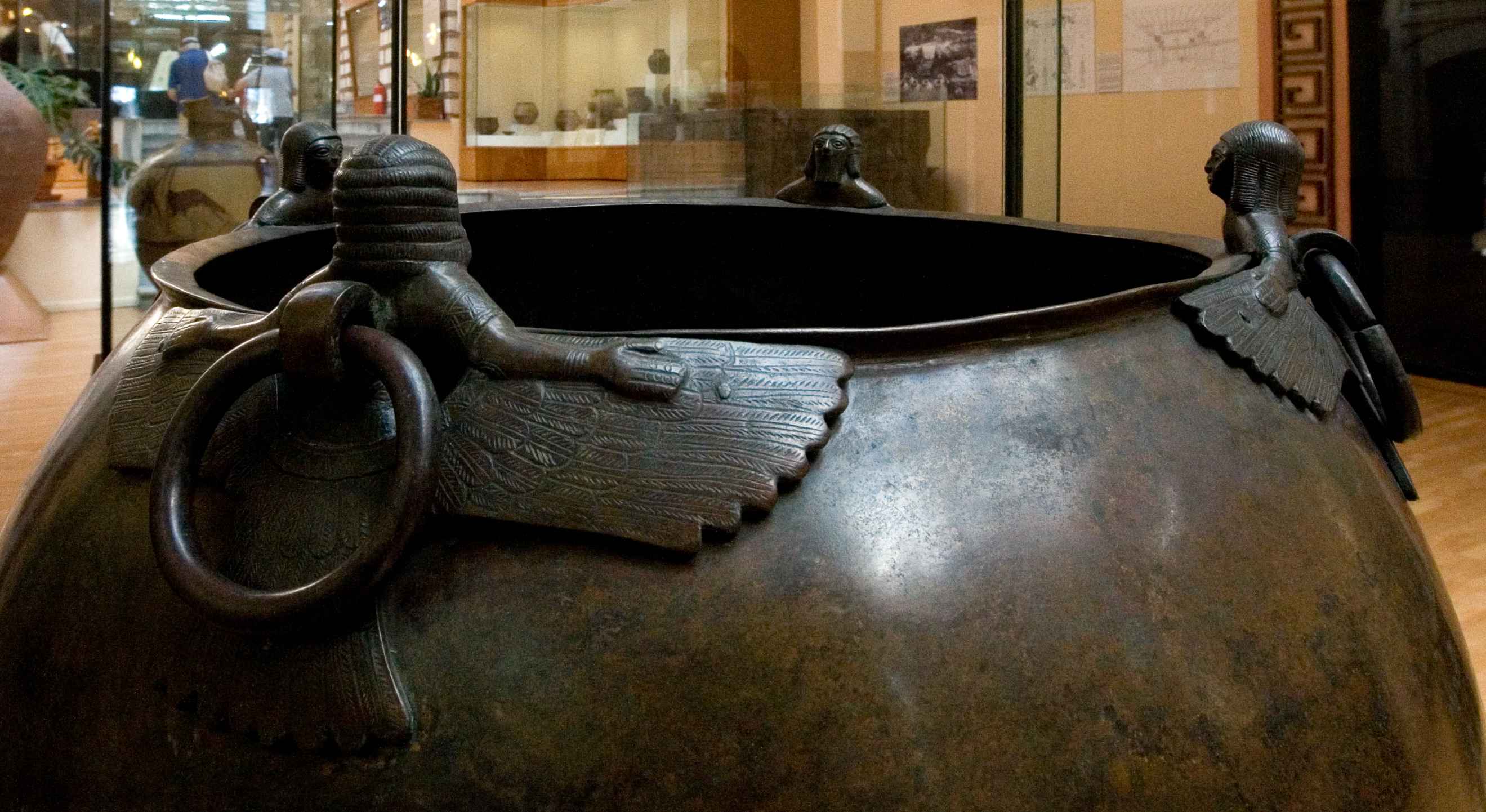
The caldron's bronze-sculpted handle
