= Tushpuea =

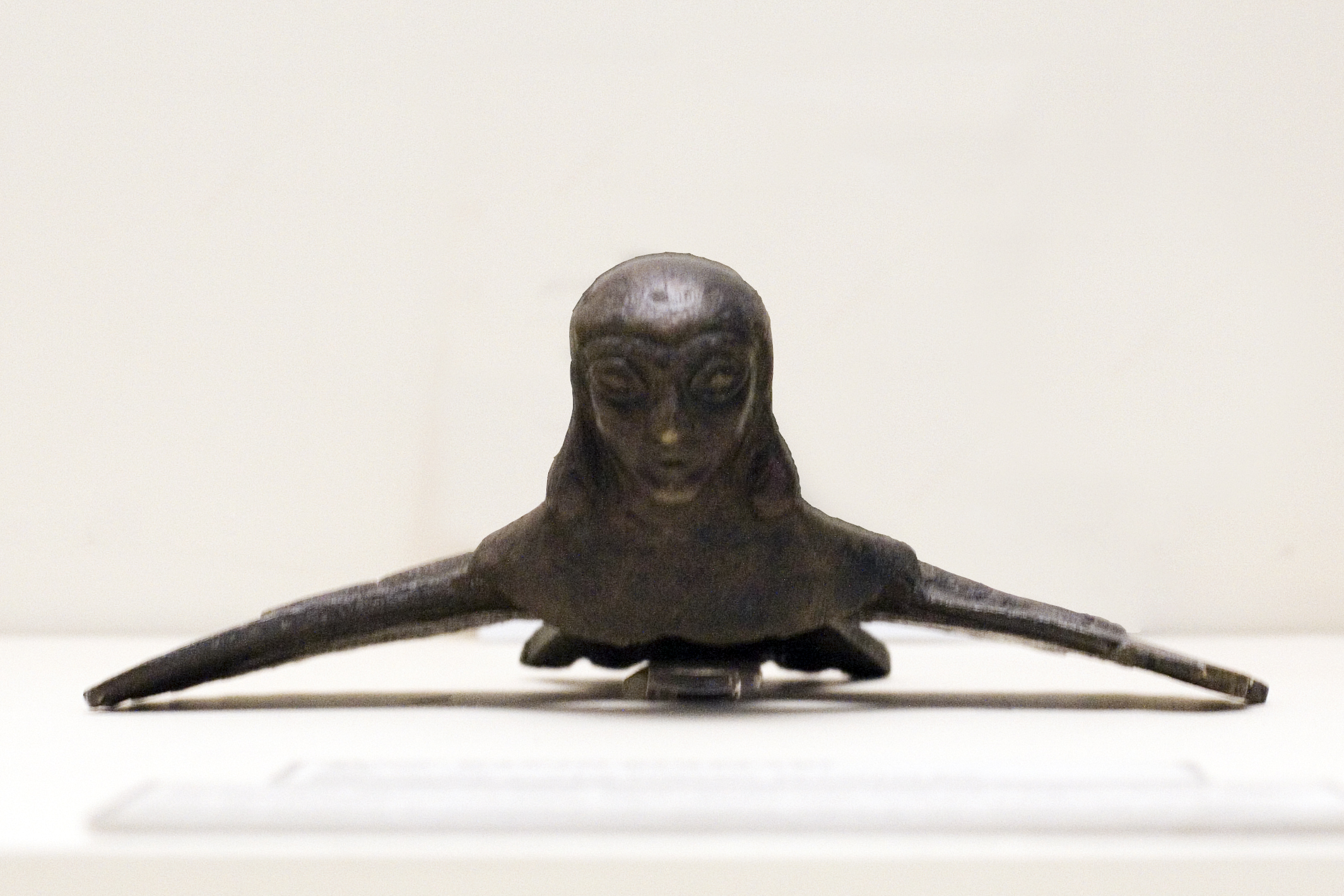
Bronze figurine of the winged goddess Tushpuea, with suspension hook

Tushpuea (Armenian:Տուշպուեա) is an Urartian goddess from which the city of Tushpa derived its name. She may have been the wife of the solar god Shivini as both are listed as third, in the list of male and female deities on the Mheri-Dur inscription. It is hypothesized that the winged female figures on Urartian ornaments and cauldrons depict this goddess.
