= Theispas =

Urartian god of weather and storms

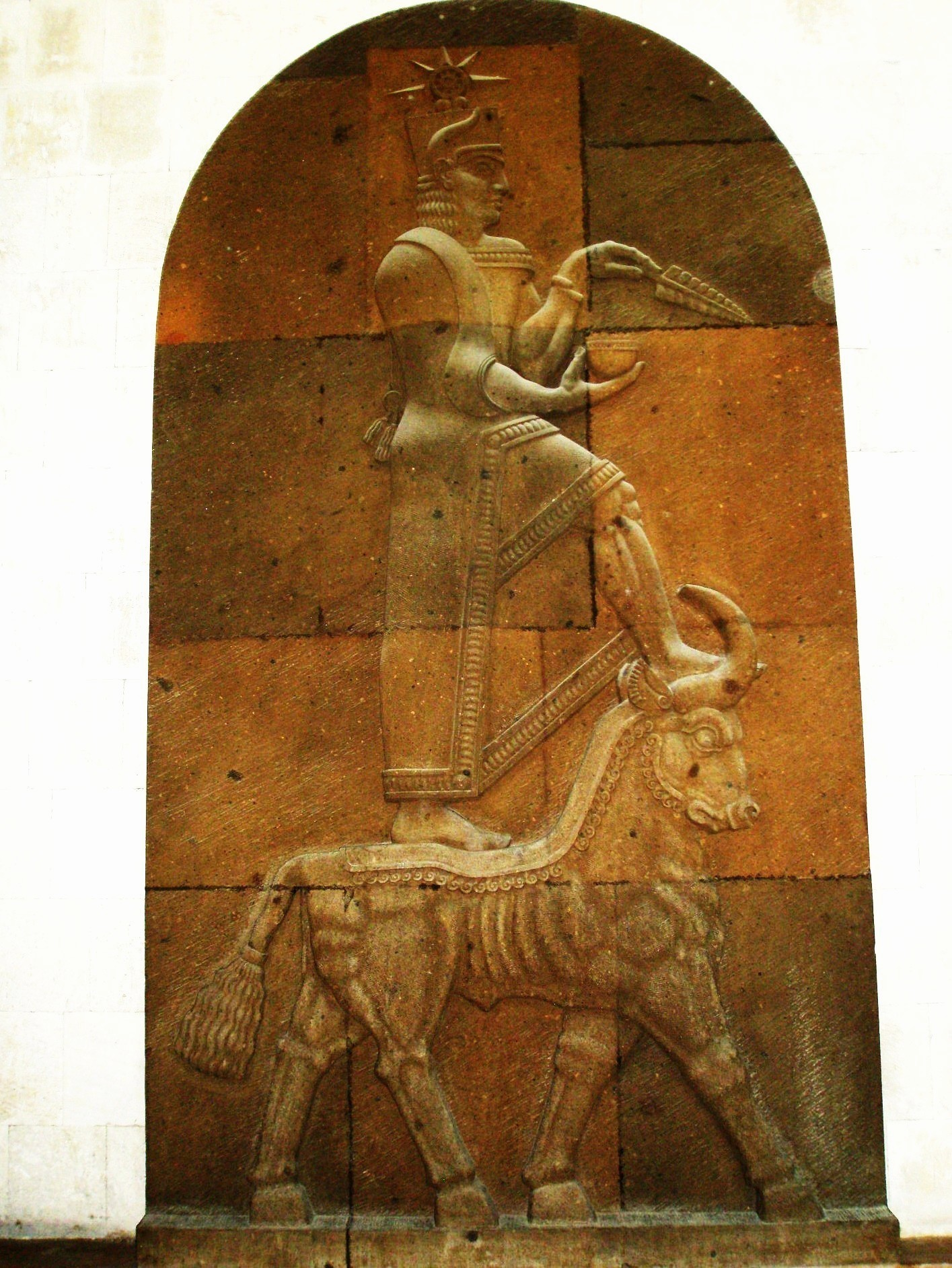
Bas relief of Theispas in the Erebuni Museum of Yerevan

Theispas (also known as Teisheba or Teišeba) was the Urartian weather god associated with storms, thunder, and sometimes war. He formed a triad with the gods Ḫaldi and Shivini. The ancient Urartian city of Teišebaini was named after the god, and the 8th-century BCE fortress of Odzaberd was dedicated to him. Theispas was often depicted as a man standing on a bull, holding a handful of thunderbolts. His wife was the goddess Huba, counterpart to the Hurrian goddess Ḫepat.

Theispas is associated with the Assyrian god Adad, the Vedic god Indra, and with Teshub, a god of the Hittites and Hurrians.

== See also ==
- Teshup
- Urartu
- Teispes
