= List of populated places in Gümüşhane Province =

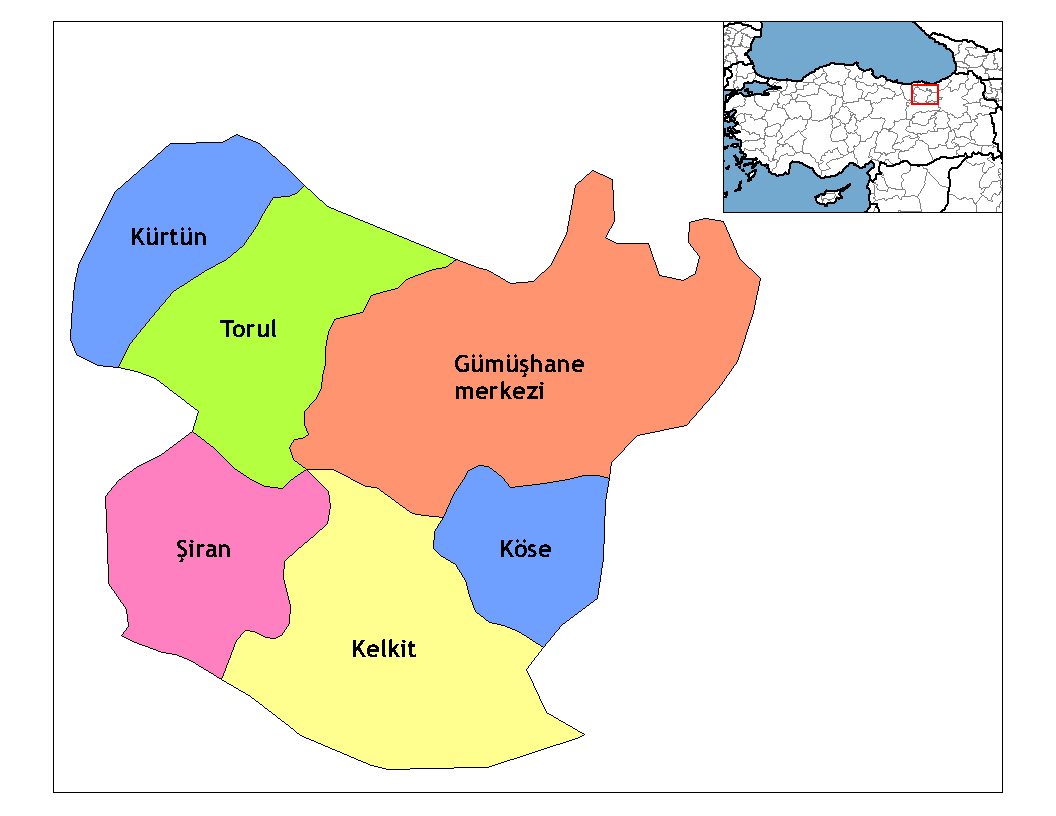
Gümüşhane Province

Below is the list of populated places in Gümüşhane Province, Turkey by district. In the following lists first place in each list is the administrative center of the district.

== Gümüşhane ==
- Gümüşhane
- Akçahisar, Gümüşhane
- Akçakale, Gümüşhane
- Akgedik, Gümüşhane
- Akhisar, Gümüşhane
- Akocak, Gümüşhane
- Akpınar, Gümüşhane
- Aksu, Gümüşhane
- Aktutan, Gümüşhane
- Alçakdere, Gümüşhane
- Alemdar, Gümüşhane
- Arduç, Gümüşhane
- Arslanca, Gümüşhane
- Arzular, Gümüşhane
- Aşağı Yuvalı, Gümüşhane
- Aşağıalıçlı, Gümüşhane
- Avşarbeyli, Gümüşhane
- Bahçecik, Gümüşhane
- Ballıca, Gümüşhane
- Bandırlık, Gümüşhane
- Beşoba, Gümüşhane
- Beyçam, Gümüşhane
- Boyluca, Gümüşhane
- Buğalı, Gümüşhane
- Çalık, Gümüşhane
- Çaltılı, Gümüşhane
- Çamlı, Gümüşhane
- Çayırardı, Gümüşhane
- Çorak, Gümüşhane
- Demirkaynak, Gümüşhane
- Demirören, Gümüşhane
- Dibekli, Gümüşhane
- Dölek, Gümüşhane
- Dörtkonak, Gümüşhane
- Dumanlı, Gümüşhane
- Duymadık, Gümüşhane
- Düğünyazı, Gümüşhane
- Erdemler, Gümüşhane
- Esenler, Gümüşhane
- Esenyurt, Gümüşhane
- Geçit, Gümüşhane
- Gökçepınar, Gümüşhane
- Gökdere, Gümüşhane
- Gözeler, Gümüşhane
- Gümüşkaya, Gümüşhane
- Güngören, Gümüşhane
- Güvercinlik, Gümüşhane
- Harmancık, Gümüşhane
- Hasköy, Gümüşhane
- İkisu, Gümüşhane
- İkiz, Gümüşhane
- İncesu, Gümüşhane
- Kale, Gümüşhane
- Kaletaş, Gümüşhane
- Karamustafa, Gümüşhane
- Kayabaşı, Gümüşhane
- Kazantaş, Gümüşhane
- Keçikaya, Gümüşhane
- Kılıçören, Gümüşhane
- Kırıklı, Gümüşane
- Kızılca, Gümüşhane
- Kocapınar, Gümüşhane
- Kocayokuş, Gümüşhane
- Kurtoğlu, Gümüşhane
- Mescitli, Gümüşhane
- Nazlıçayır, Gümüşhane
- Olucak, Gümüşhane
- Olukdere, Gümüşhane
- Örenler, Gümüşhane
- Övündü, Gümüşhane
- Pehlivantaşı, Gümüşhane
- Pirahmet, Gümüşhane
- Sargınkaya, Gümüşhane
- Sarıçiçek, Gümüşhane
- Söğütağıl, Gümüşhane
- Sungurbeyli, Gümüşhane
- Süle, Gümüşhane
- Süngübayır, Gümüşhane
- Şephane, Gümüşhane
- Tamzı, Gümüşhane
- Tandırlık, Gümüşhane
- Tekke, Gümüşhane
- Üçkol, Gümüşhane
- Yağlıdere, Gümüşhane
- Yağmurdere, Gümüşhane
- Yaydemir, Gümüşhane
- Yayladere, Gümüşhane
- Yenice, Gümüşhane
- Yeniköy, Gümüşhane
- Yeniyol, Gümüşhane
- Yeşildere, Gümüşhane
- Yeşilyurt, Gümüşhane
- Yitirmez, Gümüşhane
- Yukarı Alıçlı, Gümüşhane
- Yukarı Yuvalı, Gümüşhane

== Kelkit ==
- Kelkit
- Ağıl, Kelkit
- Ağlık, Kelkit
- Akdağ, Kelkit
- Aksöğüt, Kelkit
- Alacat, Kelkit
- Aşağıözlüce, Kelkit
- Aşut, Kelkit
- Aydoğdu, Kelkit
- Aziz, Kelkit
- Babakonağı, Kelkit
- Balıklı, Kelkit
- Balkaya, Kelkit
- Başpınar, Kelkit
- Belenli, Kelkit
- Beşdeğirmen, Kelkit
- Bezendi, Kelkit
- Bindal, Kelkit
- Bulak, Kelkit
- Cemalli, Kelkit
- Çağlar, Kelkit
- Çakırlar, Kelkit
- Çambaşı, Kelkit
- Çamur, Kelkit
- Çimenli, Kelkit
- Çömlecik, Kelkit
- Dayısı, Kelkit
- Deliler, Kelkit
- Deredolu, Kelkit
- Dereyüzü, Kelkit
- Devekorusu, Kelkit
- Doğanca, Kelkit
- Doğankavak, Kelkit
- Dölek, Kelkit
- Elmelik, Kelkit
- Eskikadı, Kelkit
- Eskiyol, Kelkit
- Eymür, Kelkit
- Gerdekhisar, Kelkit
- Gödül, Kelkit
- Güllüce, Kelkit
- Gültepe, Kelkit
- Gümüşgöze, Kelkit
- Günbatur, Kelkit
- Güneyçevirme, Kelkit
- Gürleyik, Kelkit
- Güzyurdu, Kelkit
- Karacaören, Kelkit
- Karaçayır, Kelkit
- Karşıyaka, Kelkit
- Kaş, Kelkit
- Kazanpınar, Kelkit
- Kılıççı, Kelkit
- Kılıçtaşı, Kelkit
- Kınalıtaş, Kelkit
- Kızılca, Kelkit
- Kozoğlu, Kelkit
- Kömür, Kelkit
- Köycük, Kelkit
- Kuşluk, Kelkit
- Obalar, Kelkit
- Oğuz, Kelkit
- Öbektaş, Kelkit
- Öğütlü, Kelkit
- Örenbel, Kelkit
- Özen, Kelkit
- Sadak, Kelkit
- Salördek, Kelkit
- Sarışeyh, Kelkit
- Söğütlü, Kelkit
- Sökmen, Kelkit
- Sütveren, Kelkit
- Şen, Kelkit
- Tütenli, Kelkit
- Uzunkol, Kelkit
- Ünlüpınar, Kelkit
- Yarbaşı, Kelkit
- Yenice, Kelkit
- Yeniköy, Kelkit
- Yeniyol, Kelkit
- Yeşilova, Kelkit
- Yeşilyurt, Kelkit
- Yolçatı, Kelkit
- Yukarıözlüce, Kelkit

== Köse ==
- Köse
- Akbaba, Köse
- Altıntaş, Köse
- Bizgili, Köse
- Gökçeköy, Köse
- Kabaktepe, Köse
- Kayadibi, Köse
- Oylumdere, Köse
- Örenşar, Köse
- Övünce, Köse
- Özbeyli, Köse
- Salyazı, Köse
- Subaşı, Köse
- Yaylım, Köse
- Yuvacık, Köse

== Kürtün ==
- Kürtün
- Akçal, Kürtün
- Aktaş, Kürtün
- Araköy, Kürtün
- Arpacık, Kürtün
- Aşağıkaradere, Kürtün
- Bağlama, Kürtün
- Beşirköy, Kürtün
- Beytarla, Kürtün
- Çayırçukur, Kürtün
- Damlı, Kürtün
- Demirciler, Kürtün
- Eğrigüney, Kürtün
- Ekinciler, Kürtün
- Elceğiz, Kürtün
- Elmalı, Kürtün
- Göndere, Kürtün
- Gündoğdu, Kürtün
- Günyüzü, Kürtün
- Gürgenli, Kürtün
- Kırgeriş, Kürtün
- Kızılcatam, Kürtün
- Kızılot, Kürtün
- Konacık, Kürtün
- Kuşluk, Kürtün
- Özkürtün, Kürtün
- Sapmaz, Kürtün
- Sarıbaba, Kürtün
- Söğüteli, Kürtün
- Şendere, Kürtün
- Taşlıca, Kürtün
- Tilkicek, Kürtün
- Üçtaş, Kürtün
- Yaylalı, Kürtün
- Yeşilköy, Kürtün
- Yukarıkaradere, Kürtün

== Şiran ==
- Şiran
- Akbulak, Şiran
- Akçalı, Şiran
- Aksaray, Şiran
- Akyayla, Şiran
- Alacahan, Şiran
- Alıç, Şiran
- Araköy, Şiran
- Ardıçlı, Şiran
- Arıtaş, Şiran
- Aşağıduruçay, Şiran
- Babacan, Şiran
- Babuş, Şiran
- Bahçeli, Şiran
- Balıkhisar, Şiran
- Başköy, Şiran
- Belen, Şiran
- Beydere, Şiran
- Bilgili, Şiran
- Boğazyayla, Şiran
- Bolluk, Şiran
- Çağıl, Şiran
- Çakırkaya, Şiran
- Çalköy, Şiran
- Çambaşı, Şiran
- Çanakçı, Şiran
- Çatmalar, Şiran
- Çavlan, Şiran
- Çevrepınar, Şiran
- Darıbükü, Şiran
- Dilekyolu, Şiran
- Dumanoluğu, Şiran
- Eldiğin, Şiran
- Elmaçukuru, Şiran
- Ericek, Şiran
- Evren, Şiran
- Gökçeler, Şiran
- Günbatur, Şiran
- Günyüzü, Şiran
- Güreşköy, Şiran
- İncedere, Şiran
- İnözü, Şiran
- Kadıçayırı, Şiran
- Karaşeyh, Şiran
- Kavaklıdere, Şiran
- Kavakpınarı, Şiran
- Kaynakbaşı, Şiran
- Kırıntı, Şiran
- Konaklı, Şiran
- Koyunbaba, Şiran
- Kozağaç, Şiran
- Ozanca, Şiran
- Örenkale, Şiran
- Paşapınarı, Şiran
- Pelirli, Şiran
- Sadıkköy, Şiran
- Sarıca, Şiran
- Selimiye, Şiran
- Sellidere, Şiran
- Seydibaba, Şiran
- Sinanlı, Şiran
- Söğütalan, Şiran
- Susuz, Şiran
- Telme, Şiran
- Tepedam, Şiran
- Yedibölük, Şiran
- Yeniköy, Şiran
- Yeşilbük, Şiran
- Yolbilen, Şiran
- Yukarıduruçay, Şiran
- Yukarıkulaca, Şiran

== Torul ==
- Torul
- Aksüt, Torul
- Alınyayla, Torul
- Altınpınar, Torul
- Arılı, Torul
- Arpalı, Torul
- Atalar, Torul
- Bahçelik, Torul
- Budak, Torul
- Büyükçit, Torul
- Cebeli, Torul
- Dağdibi, Torul
- Dedeli, Torul
- Demirkapı, Torul
- Gülaçar, Torul
- Gümüştuğ, Torul
- Günay, Torul
- Güvemli, Torul
- Güzeloluk, Torul
- Harmancık, Torul
- Herek, Torul
- Işık, Torul
- İlecik, Torul
- İnkılap, Torul
- Kalecik, Torul
- Kirazlık, Torul
- Kocadal, Torul
- Kopuz, Torul
- Köstere, Torul
- Küçükçit, Torul
- Tokçam, Torul
- Uğurtaşı, Torul
- Yalınkavak, Torul
- Yeşilköy, Torul
- Yıldız, Torul
- Yurt, Torul
- Yücebelen, Torul
- Zigana, Torul
