= List of municipalities in Gümüşhane Province =

This is the List of municipalities in Gümüşhane Province, Turkey as of March 2023.

District	Municipality
Gümüşhane	Arzularkabaköy
Gümüşhane	Gümüşhane
Kelkit	Deredolu
Kelkit	Gümüşgöze
Kelkit	Kelkit
Kelkit	Öbektaş
Kelkit	Söğütlü
Kelkit	Ünlüpınar
Köse	Köse
Kürtün	Kürtün
Kürtün	Özkürtün
Şiran	Şiran
Şiran	Yeşilbük
Torul	Torul
