= Satala Aphrodite =

Ancient statue (c. 2nd–1st century BC)

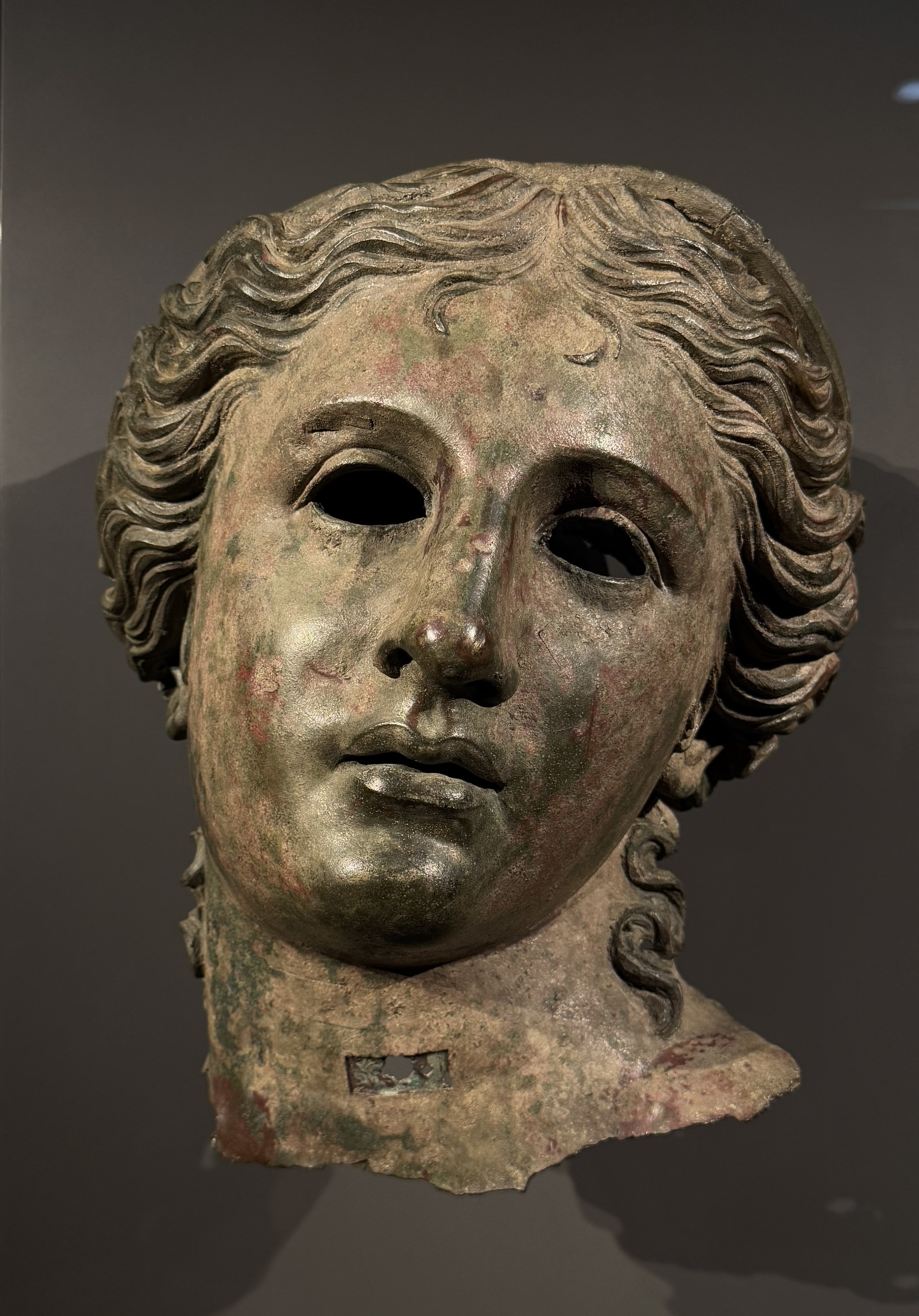
- The head of the Satala Aphrodite
- Material: Bronze
- Size: head: 35.5 cm × 31 cm × 23.6 cm (14.0 in × 12.2 in × 9.3 in)
- Created: 2nd–1st centuries BC, Asia Minor
- Discovered: 1872; Satala (present-day Sadak, Kelkit District, Gümüşhane Province, Turkey)
- Present location: Room 22, British Museum, Department of Greek and Roman Antiquities

The Satala Aphrodite is an over-life-sized head of a bronze Hellenistic statue discovered in Satala (classical Armenia Minor, present-day Sadak, Gümüşhane Province, Turkey). Probably created in the 2nd or 1st century BC in Asia Minor, it was acquired by the British Museum in 1873, a year after its discovery. It has been widely admired since its discovery and likened to the Aphrodite of Knidos by some scholars.

It is usually assigned to the Greek goddess Aphrodite, but has been associated with her Armenian equivalent Anahit, whose major temple was located not far from Satala. Consequently, the head has been widely depicted in Armenian culture as a symbol of the country's pre-Christian heritage. Although not found in modern-day Armenia, there have been unsuccessful efforts to move the fragments to Armenia.

== Discovery and acquisition by the British Museum ==
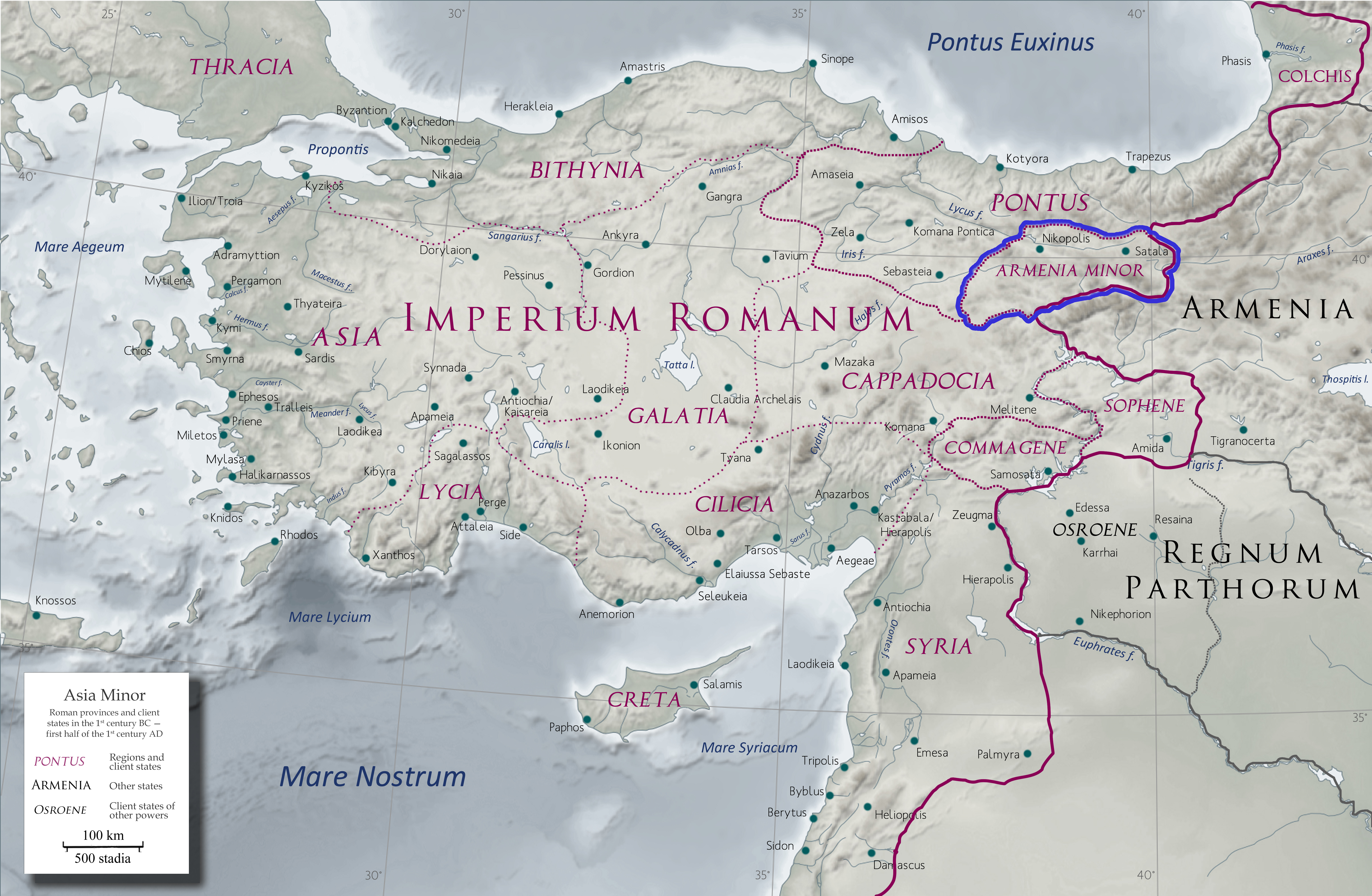
Roman Asia Minor in the early 1st century AD, with Armenia Minor as a Roman client state. Its two major centres, Satala and Nicopolis are shown.

The head was found in 1872 by an old man named Youssouf who was digging in his field with a pickaxe, at a depth of around 2 feet (0.61 m), near the village of Sadak, in what was once the Roman fortress of Satala, on the Kelkit River, north of Erzincan (then in the Ottoman Empire, now Turkey). The man uncovered fragments of a bronze statue, including the head and a hand. Arthur Frothingham reported two decades later that according to locals the fragments were found in the process of making a threshing floor. The head was acquired in Constantinople by Savas Kougioumtsoglou, a Greek antiquities dealer, who passed it to another dealer, Photiades Bey, who was later Ottoman ambassador to Italy. Photiades took it to Rome, where it was sold to the art dealer Alessandro Castellani, an Italian goldsmith and collector, who in turn sold it to the British Museum in 1873.

Gunning noted that "extraordinary efforts" were made to acquire the statue. She argues that it was sold in violation of both Ottoman and Italian laws. Bartın University archeologist Şahin Yıldırım said the head was "smuggled" from Turkey. Castellani bribed Italian customs officials to export his collection. The acquisition was negotiated by Charles Thomas Newton, the museum's Keeper of Greek and Roman Antiquities. Newton appealed directly to British Prime Minister William Ewart Gladstone, who agreed to provide £27,000 (£2 million in 2021) for Castellani's collection.

The hand was donated by Castellani to the British Museum in 1875. The rest of the statue was never found, despite excavations by Alfred Biliotti and David George Hogarth. As of 2022, the fragments are displayed at the museum's Room 22 in a glass case over a ventilation grille.

== Description ==
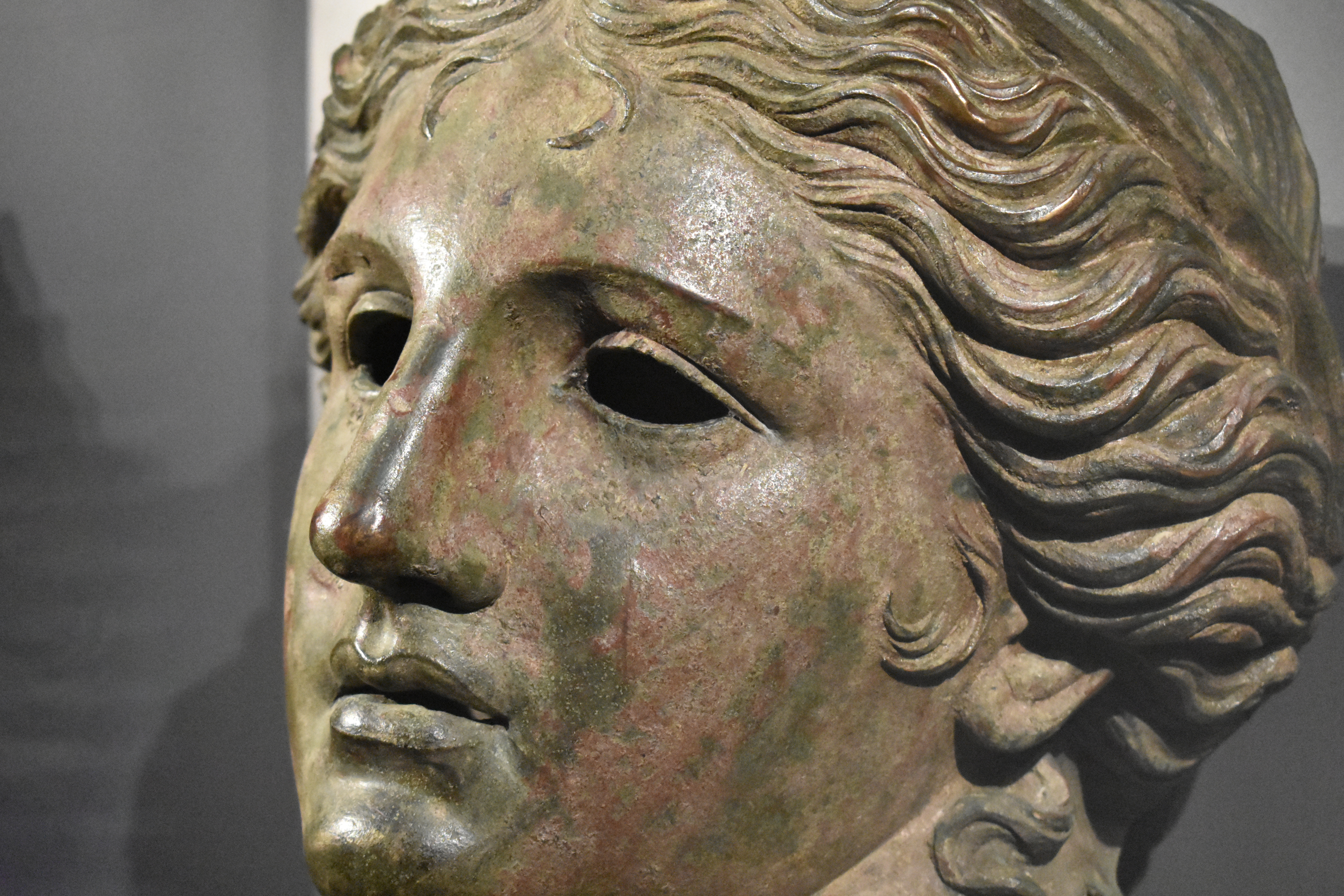
A close up view

The head is 38.1 cm (15.0 in) high and 93 cm (37 in) in circumference. It weighs 10 kilograms (22 lb) and the bronze is 2–3 mm thick. The back of the head and neck are severely damaged, while the top of the head was damaged during excavation. The face has largely been preserved, but shows signs of oxidisation, while the front of the neck had two faults in casting, which have been repaired by the insertion of strips of bronze. The eyes originally had either inlaid gemstones or glass. The hair is waved with curls on the forehead and ringlets on the sides, while the mouth is slightly open. William Lethaby described the face as wide with a "radiant yet disdainful expression", while Allan and Maitland suggested that the subject is in a "pensive mood".

Herbert Maryon described its creation as a good example of a technique which began in the 4th century BC:

They modelled a head, perhaps in clay, and formed the outer mould in the usual manner. They then lined the mould with thin slabs of wax, about 3/16 inch (4.8 mm) thick, pressing the wax fairly closely into all the forms. To ensure the free flow of the bronze they sometimes added small bridges of wax, say from the hair to the eyebrows and across the lips inside the head, before the core was inserted.

Maryon noted that besides the bridges, the inside of the head contains a number of fingermarks, which proves that the core "could not have been made first". The hair was cut into curls with a chisel.

The left hand, 29.2 cm (11.5 in) long, which was found together with the head, holds a fragment of drapery. Lâtife Summerer suggested that the original statue was more than 2 metres (6 ft 7 in) in height.

== Origin ==
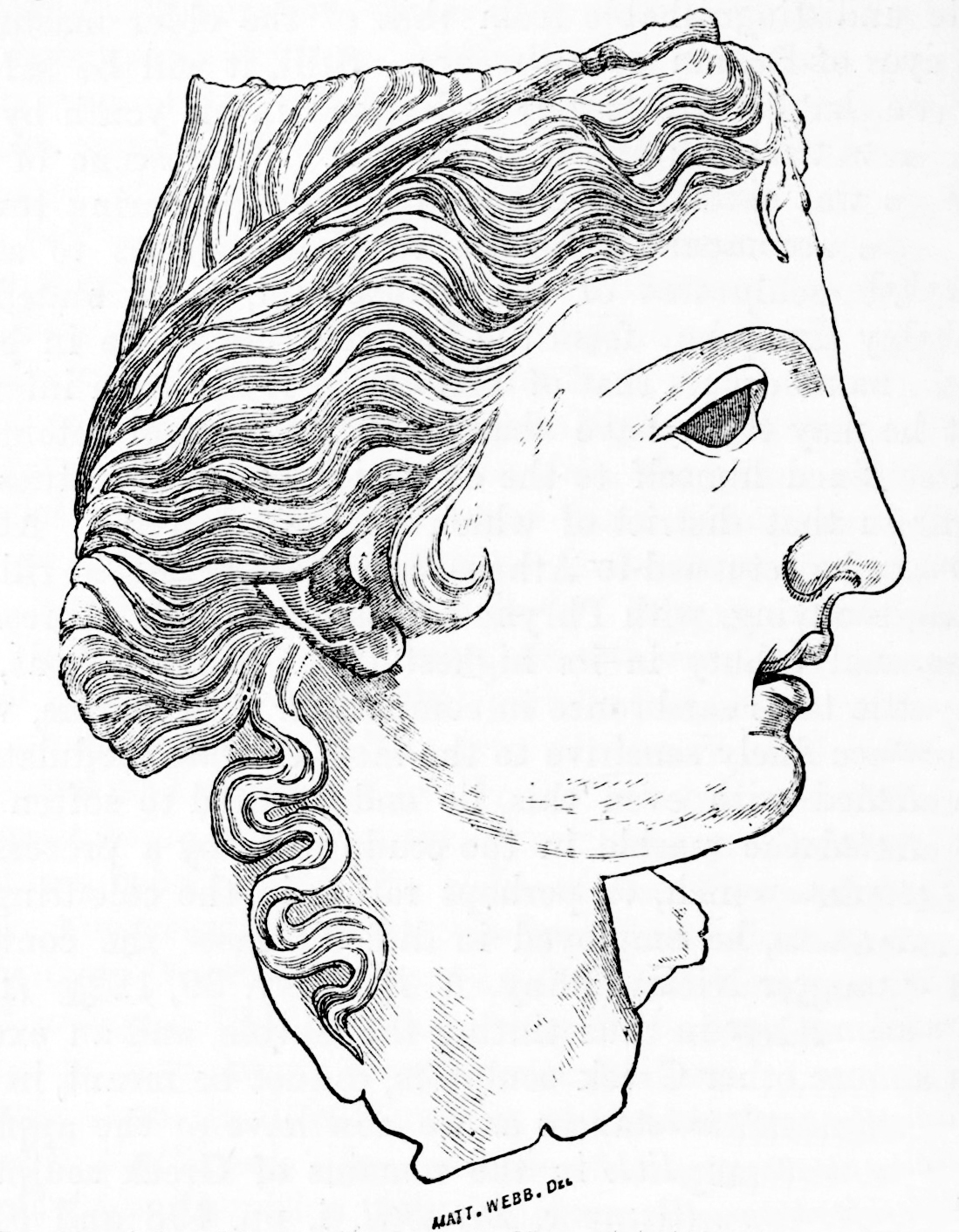
A drawing of the head in the 9th edition of the Encyclopædia Britannica (1875), two years after its acquisition by the British Museum.

The sculpture was initially dated to the 4th century BC, but this was subsequently questioned and it was placed in the 2nd century BC. Modern scholars and the British Museum place its creation in the 2nd or 1st century BC. (Note: The British Museum website dates it to the 1st century BC, while the display at the museum (as of 2022) indicates 200–100 BC.) Sara Anderson Immerwahr argued that its style is indicative of a 2nd century BC dating. Babken Arakelian also argued in favor of the 2nd century BC, while Reynold Higgins suggested that "it may be a cast from a mould made in c. 150 BC". Lucilla Burn argues for a late Hellenistic date, while Terence Mitford suggested it is from the "late Hellenistic or early Roman period". Brunilde Sismondo Ridgway writes that it is dated no earlier than the Augustan period.

Most scholars agree that it was probably created in Asia Minor. James R. Russell suggested western Asia Minor. Lethaby suggested that it is a work in an Alexandrian style.

Matthew P. Canepa described it as of "Hellenistic workmanship". Dyfri Williams and Lucilla Burn believe it came from a Greek or Hellenistic cult statue. Reynold Higgins suggested that "it may be a Greek or Hellenistic original, or a Roman copy".

German archaeologist Richard Engelmann, who first described the head in detail in 1878, considered it a replica of the Aphrodite of Knidos (Cnidian Aphrodite). Olivier Rayet and Zhores Khachatryan believed it was either a replica of Aphrodite of Knidos or was inspired by it. Vrej Nersessian noted that it is "now generally recognized" that its style reflects that of Scopas rather than that of Praxiteles (the author of the Cnidian Aphrodite), because of the "low broad forehead, the intensely gazing deep-set eyes, and the large heavy nose, are all characteristic of the strongly marked individuality of that sculptor's heads".

== Subject ==
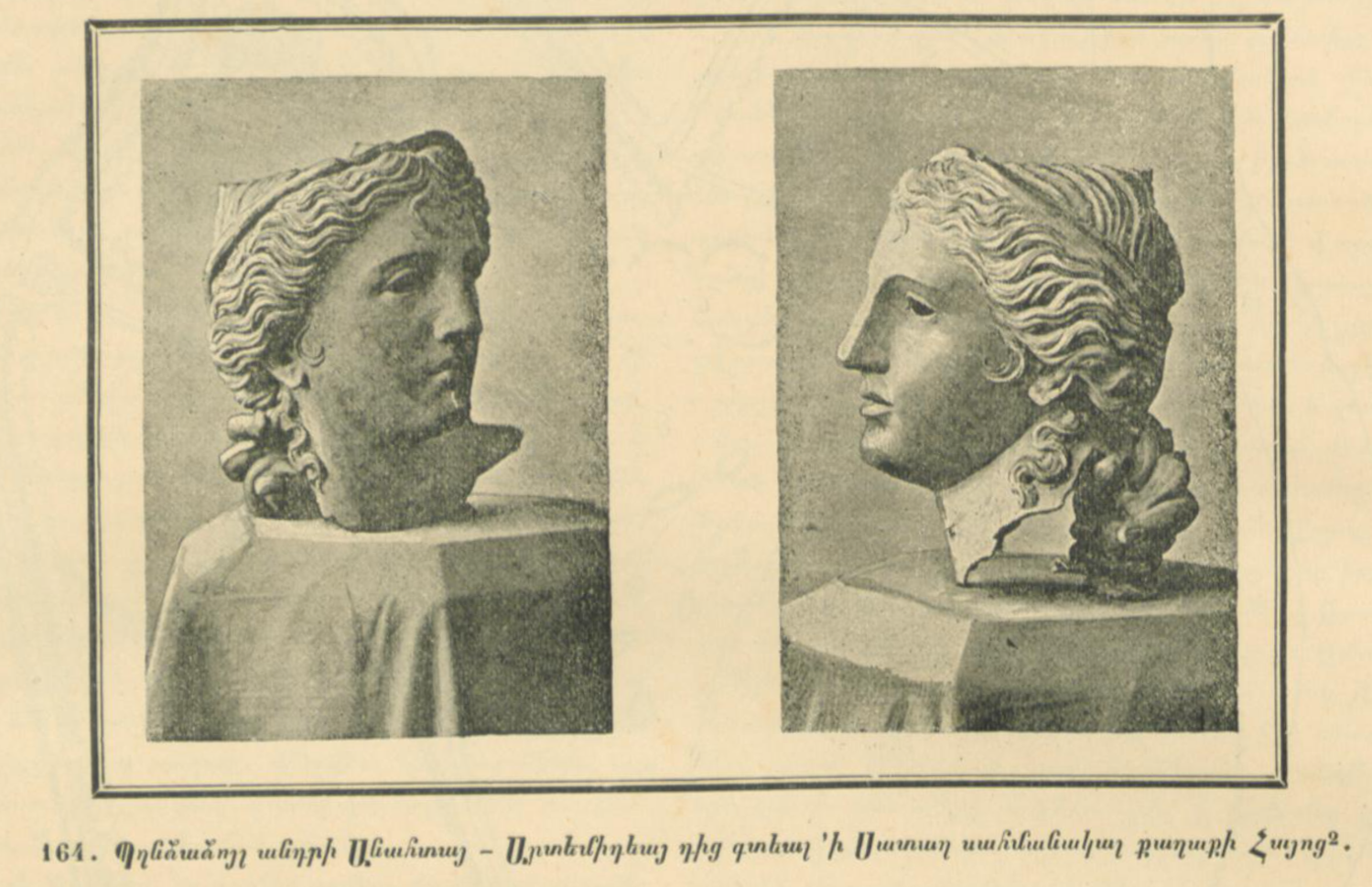
The head in Ghevont Alishan's 1890 book Ayrarat, in which he identified the statue with Anahit.

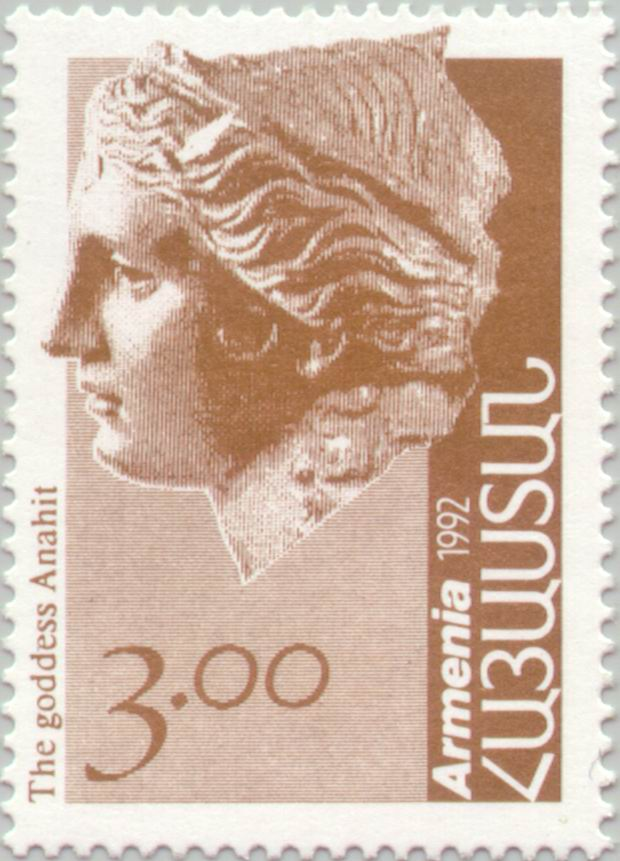
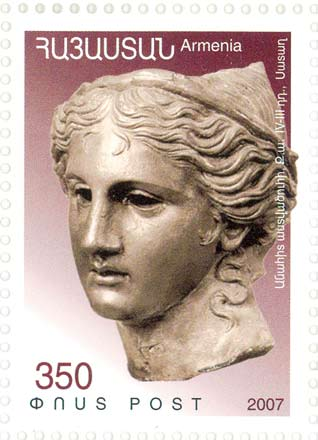
1992 and 2007 Armenian postages stamp depicting the head

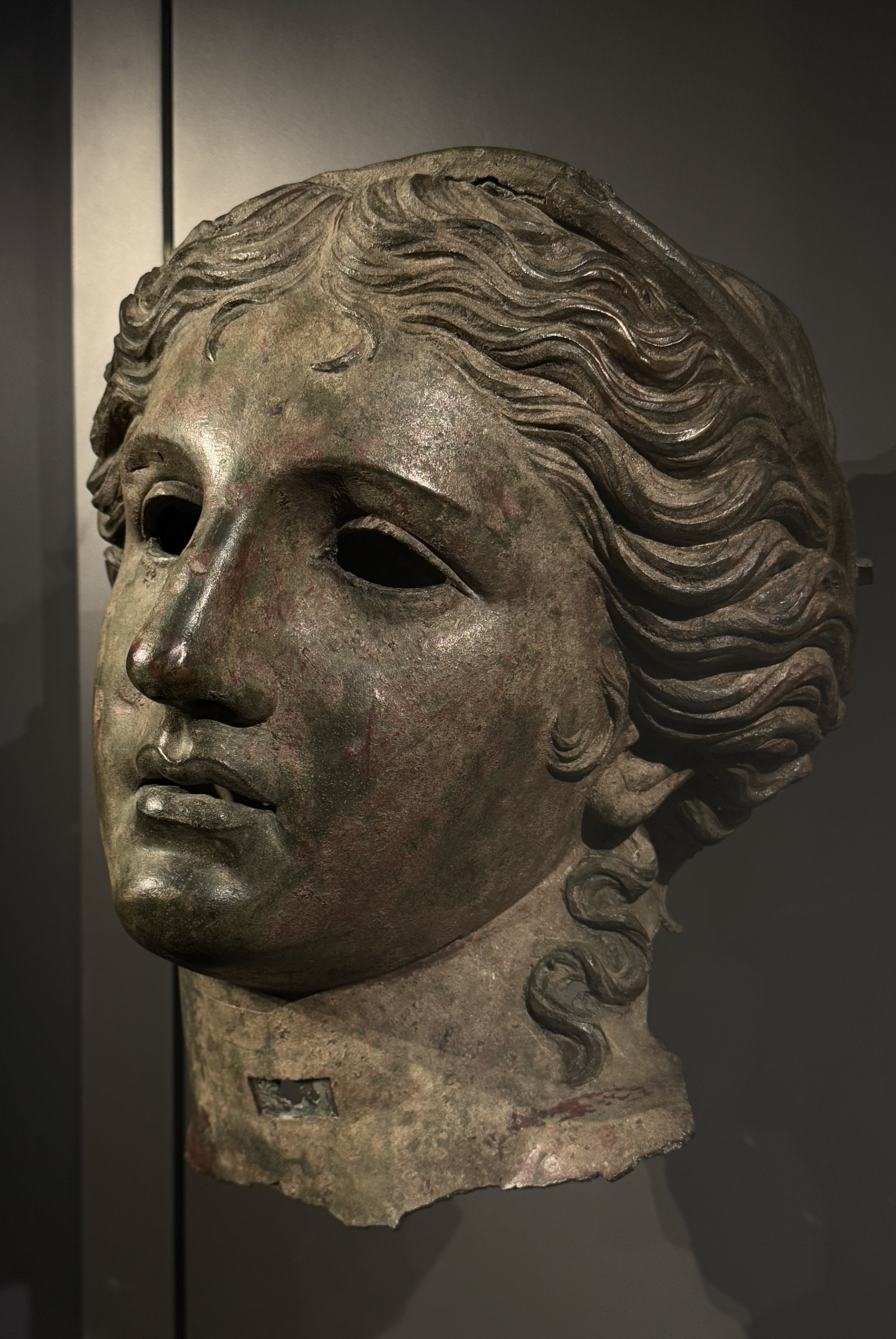
Side view

As early as 1873 Charles Thomas Newton identified the head with Venus. It has been generally assigned to Aphrodite. (Note: "usually been interpreted as representing Aphrodite", "normally assigned to Aphrodite", "of the Greek Aphrodite type") However, this has not been universally accepted, with Otto Benndorf suggesting commonalities with male deities, such as Apollo or Dionysos. Babken Arakelyan found Artemis to be a more probable subject than Aphrodite.

=== Association with Anahit(a) and Armenia ===
The Armenian scholar Ghevont Alishan, in his 1890 book Ayrarat, asserted that the head represents Anahit (from Iranian Anahita or Anaïtis), the Armenian equivalent of Aphrodite. (Note: The head also appeared on the cover of Alishan's 1895 book Ancient Beliefs or Pagan Religions of Armenians.) Some scholars have adopted this view, based on the proximity of the location of its discovery (Satala) to a major temple of Anahit in Erez (Eriza) in present-day Erzincan, around 30 km (19 mi) south of Satala. The temple at Erez, which "enjoyed great fame", was established, according to tradition, by Tigranes the Great in the first century BC and was the "wealthiest and most venerable in Armenia" per Cicero. Both Satala and Erez were located in the Acilisene (Եկեղեաց, Ekełeats‘) province of classical Armenia Minor.

Anahit's cult in Acilisene was so great that it was known as Anaetica (the land of Anahit/Anaïtis). Her cult at Eriza was closely linked with the Armenian monarchy, with kings travelling annually to the goddess's festival. Dickran Kouymjian wrote that the statue was "probably imported into Armenia by the royal court." Sirarpie Der Nersessian noted that tradition says Greek statues were brought from the Hellenistic cities by Tigranes the Great, while George Bournoutian argued that the statues were brought to Armenia by Greek priests and cults. After Armenia's conversion to Christianity in the early 4th century, Anahit's images were destroyed. Lethaby suggested that the head and hand "bear manifest evidence of violent destruction" of the "Greek statues of bronze brought to Armenia".

The British Museum describes the work as a "bronze head from a cult statue of Anahita in the guise of Aphrodite or Artemis." The authors of a 2002 British Museum publication described it as being "in Hellenistic style" but "identified as a representation of the Iranian goddess Anahita." Jones, Craddock, and Barker described it as an "eastern representation" of Aphrodite. Nina Garsoïan suggested that it is of a "mixed Greco-Iranian type." Mardiros Ananikian wrote in The Mythology of All Races (1925) that it is a "Greek work (probably Aphrodite)" that was "worshiped by the Armenians."

Soviet art historians wrote in 1962 that the head, found in Armenia's western regions, may represent the Armenian goddess Anahit. Lâtife Summerer argues that its discovery in northeastern Anatolia "supports its interpretation as Anaïtis." Timothy Bruce Mitford argues that the statue was looted from the sanctuary of Anaitis at Eriza, but C. S. Lightfoot rejects this view as baseless. Robert H. Hewsen posited that it is "an obviously Hellenistic work" that is "surely not to be identified with any Armenian deity." Terence Mitford suggests that an identification as Anaitis (Anahita) is "wholly implausible".

Satala was also, for centuries, the base of Roman legions, including Legio XV Apollinaris and Legio XVI Flavia Firma. Zhores Khachatryan stated that "the Armenian origin of the statue still has to be proven". He believed that "it is more possible that it may be the statue of a Roman pagan goddess" as it was found near the site of a Roman camp inhabited during the time period of its assumed creation. Russell argued that Satala "appears to have been sufficiently important in ancient times to have been a religious centre, although there is nothing to suggest that the shrine was Armenian, or Zoroastrian" and suggested that it was a "Roman military shrine."

== Reception in the West ==
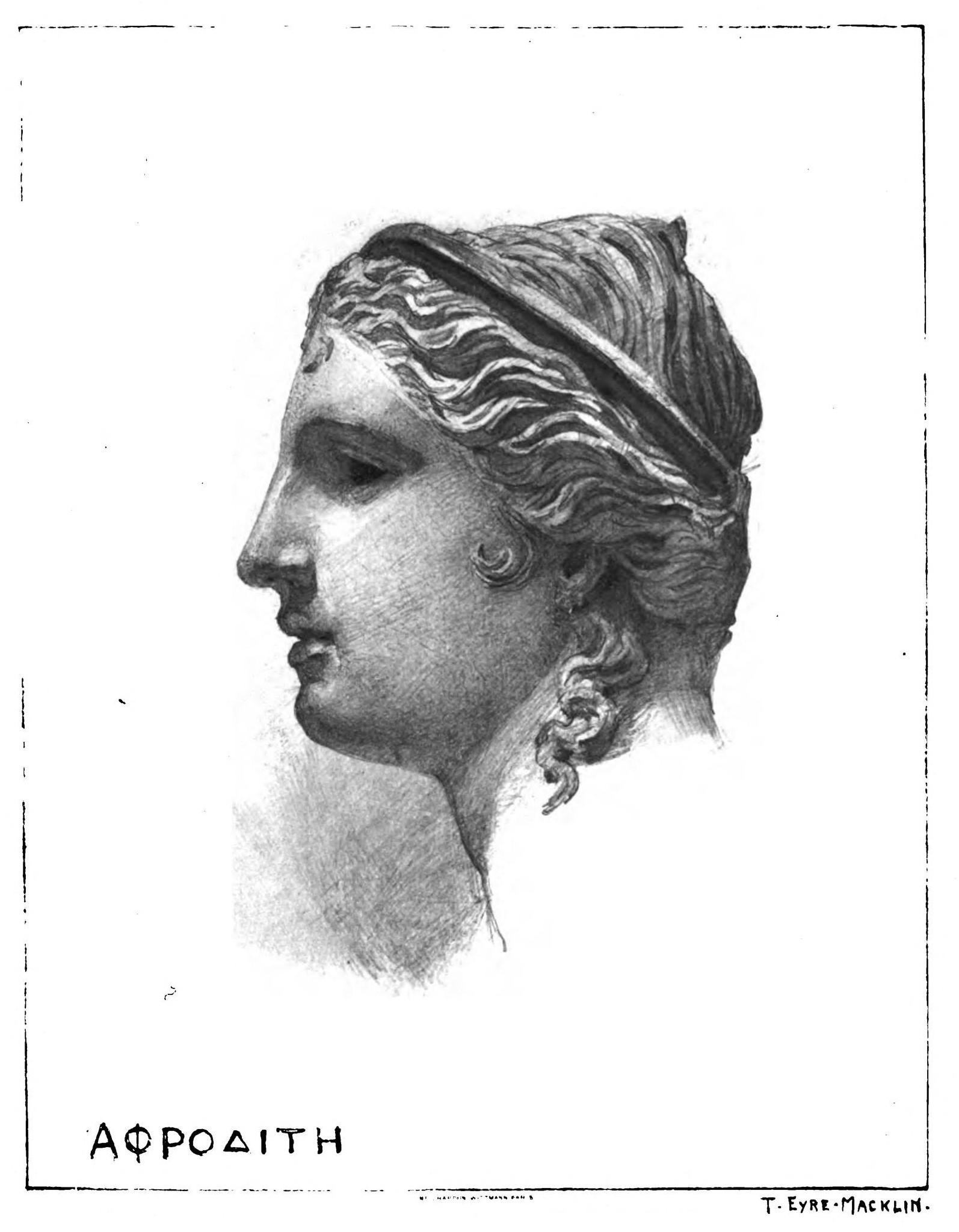
A hyalograph drawn by T.E. Macklin (1892).

The head has been widely admired in the West since its discovery. In a 1873 letter to Prime Minister Gladstone, Charles Thomas Newton wrote that the head is "the finest example of Greek work in metal" he had seen. He added that it is "the work which in beauty of conception and mastery of execution has most claim to rank next to the marbles of the Parthenon." In a Times article, Newton wrote that the first impression produced by the head is that of "majestic godlike beauty." Blackwood's Edinburgh Magazine described it as a "unique example of a Greek bronze sculptured in a large commanding style [...] executed with all the feeling and skill which belongs to Greek art." Philip Gilbert Hamerton wrote that the head depicts a "simple and beautiful antique way of dressing the hair which was so suitable for plastic representation." Arthur Frothingham described the bronze head as "one of the glories of the British Museum".

Sara Anderson Immerwahr called the bronze head "famous" and "lovely" that depicts "restless" and "ideal beauty." David Marshall Lang described it as "singularly fine", while James R. Russell called it a piece of "very fine workmanship." Lucilla Burn, former Curator in the Greek and Roman department at the British Museum, wrote that the "exceptional quality of the surviving elements" suggest that the statue "must have formed a highly impressive figure."

The head appears on the cover of The Oxford History of Greece and the Hellenistic World (2002) and in the title sequence of the 2017 film Call Me by Your Name.

== Reception in Armenia ==
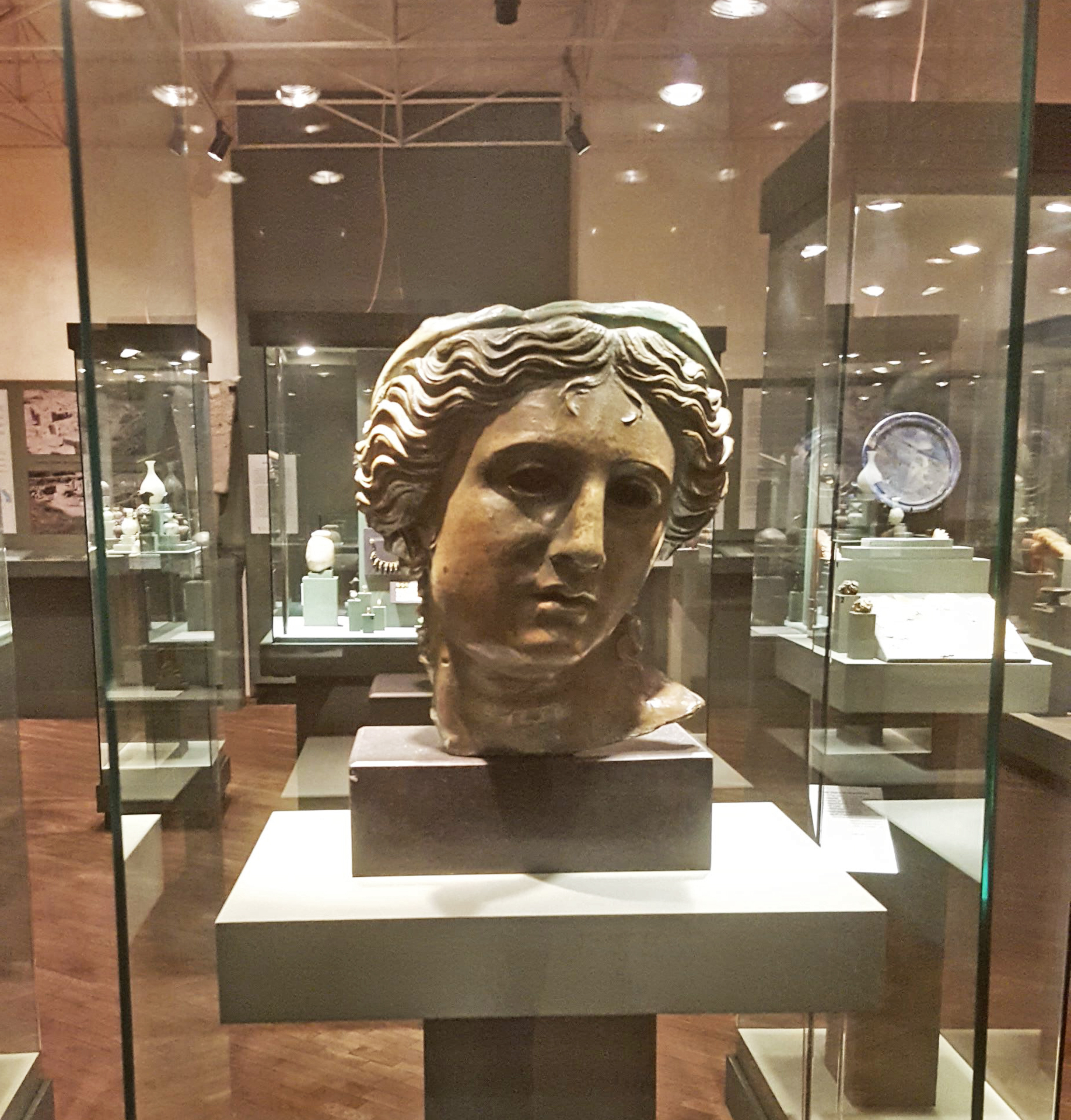
A replica at the History Museum of Armenia in Yerevan (in 2017)

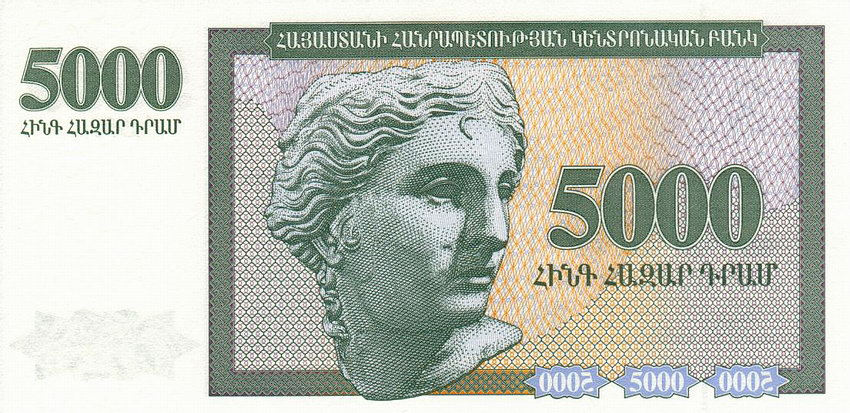
On a 5,000 Armenian dram banknote, in circulation from 1995 to 2005.

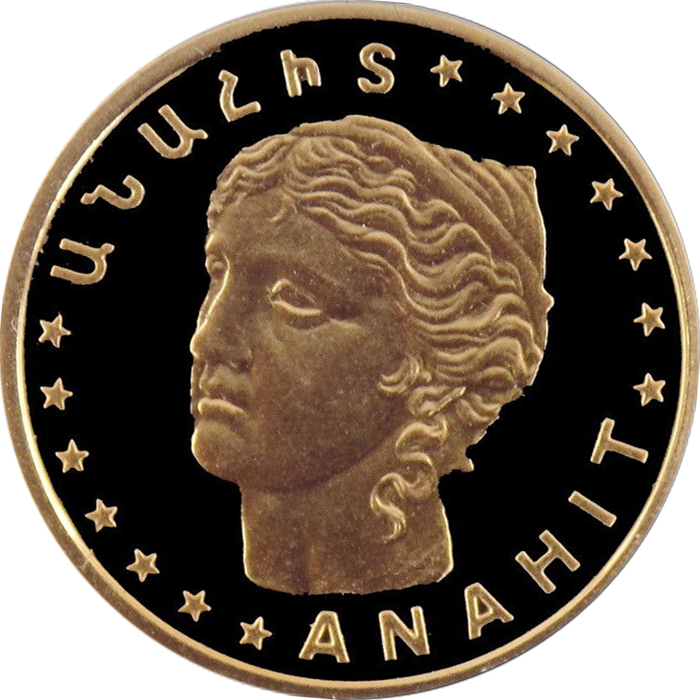
A 1997 commemorative coin depicting the head as goddess Anahit.

The tentative association of the head with Anahit has led to it becoming a symbol of Armenian culture, and a "rare surviving example of ancient Armenian cultural heritage." It is widely known in Armenia as representing Anahit. Robert H. Hewsen argued that while it is "certainly a work of external origin", it is "often touted as an example of Hellenistic art in Armenia." Babken Arakelyan considered it the most prominent of all Hellenistic statues found in historical Armenia. Dickran Kouymjian described it as "magnificent" and an "important object" that is associated with Armenia because of the location of its discovery. Kouymjian argued that the "imported head", among other archaeological findings, "testify to the interest in and market for classical art in Armenia." It may have been imported to Armenia by the royal court, possibly by Tigranes the Great, or by Greek priests and cults.

=== Artistic depictions ===
The head has "long become an inextricable staple of the Armenian cultural imagery." The head is portrayed in a mural crafted by Van Khachatur (Vanik Khachatrian) in 1959, inside the Matenadaran in Yerevan, symbolizing Armenia's Hellenistic period. A faithful replica of the head has been on display at the History Museum of Armenia in Yerevan since 1968. (Note: Literaturnaya Armenia wrote in 1976 that there are two copies in Yerevan.)

The head appeared on two postage stamp issued by Armenia in 1992 and 2007 (the latter jointly with Greece), 5,000 Armenian dram banknotes in circulation from 1995 to 2005 (along with the Garni Temple), and the first gold commemorative coin issued by the Central Bank of Armenia in 1997.

A 2000 painting, Still Life with Venus's Mask (alternatively titled Still Life with Anahit's Mask) by Lavinia Bazhbeuk-Melikyan is inspired by the head. It currently hangs at the President's Residence in Yerevan. It is depicted on the logo of the Artists' Union of Armenia.

Armenian-American Peter Balakian authored a poem titled "Head of Anahit/British Museum", which was published in Poetry magazine in 2016.

In 2025, a mural of Anahit based on the statue was painted on the building of the Yerevan State Institute of Theatre and Cinematography.

=== Efforts to move to Armenia ===
Khachatur Yesayan, a Soviet Armenian artist, proposed in 1966 to start talks with the British Museum to move the head to Armenia.

In February 2012, three months prior to the 2012 Armenian parliamentary election, Armenia's Education and Science Minister Armen Ashotyan from the ruling Republican Party called for moving the fragments of the statue to Armenia. Ashotyan claimed that this was a personal and not a political initiative. By the end of February some 20,000 signatures were collected by the RPA-affiliated Armenia Youth Fund demanding that the fragments be moved to Armenia. One proponent of the campaign argued that the "sentimental value of the goddess Anahit's statue is worth far more to the Armenians than to the tourists and visitors of the British Museum". On March 7, 2012, some one hundred people, joined by Ashotyan, demonstrated in front of the British embassy in Yerevan, chanting "Anahit, come home!" A letter was handed over to the embassy thanking the United Kingdom for preserving the fragments, but claimed that "historical justice requires" that they "be repatriated and find refuge in the country of their origin".

In response, the British ambassador Kathy Leach was quoted by the Armenian media as saying that the head will be temporarily exhibited in Armenia. Ashotyan responded that while he was thankful, "our ultimate goal is permanent return."

Zhores Khachatryan criticized the campaign as "pointless" and "populism that failed from the start." Vahan Gasparyan, head of the Ministry of Culture's Agency for the Preservation of Historical-Cultural Heritage, noted that the fragments were "not illegally exported from [Armenia], nor was it a war trophy, so that the ministry could try to return it with references to international treaties. It's possible only as an act of good will." Mark Grigorian, an Armenian-born BBC Russian journalist, noted that "it is quite obvious that the British Museum won't give anything to Armenia" and suggested that "the myths about Anahit are used in modern Armenia as a way to earn political points", which he described as populism.

=== Exhibition in Armenia ===
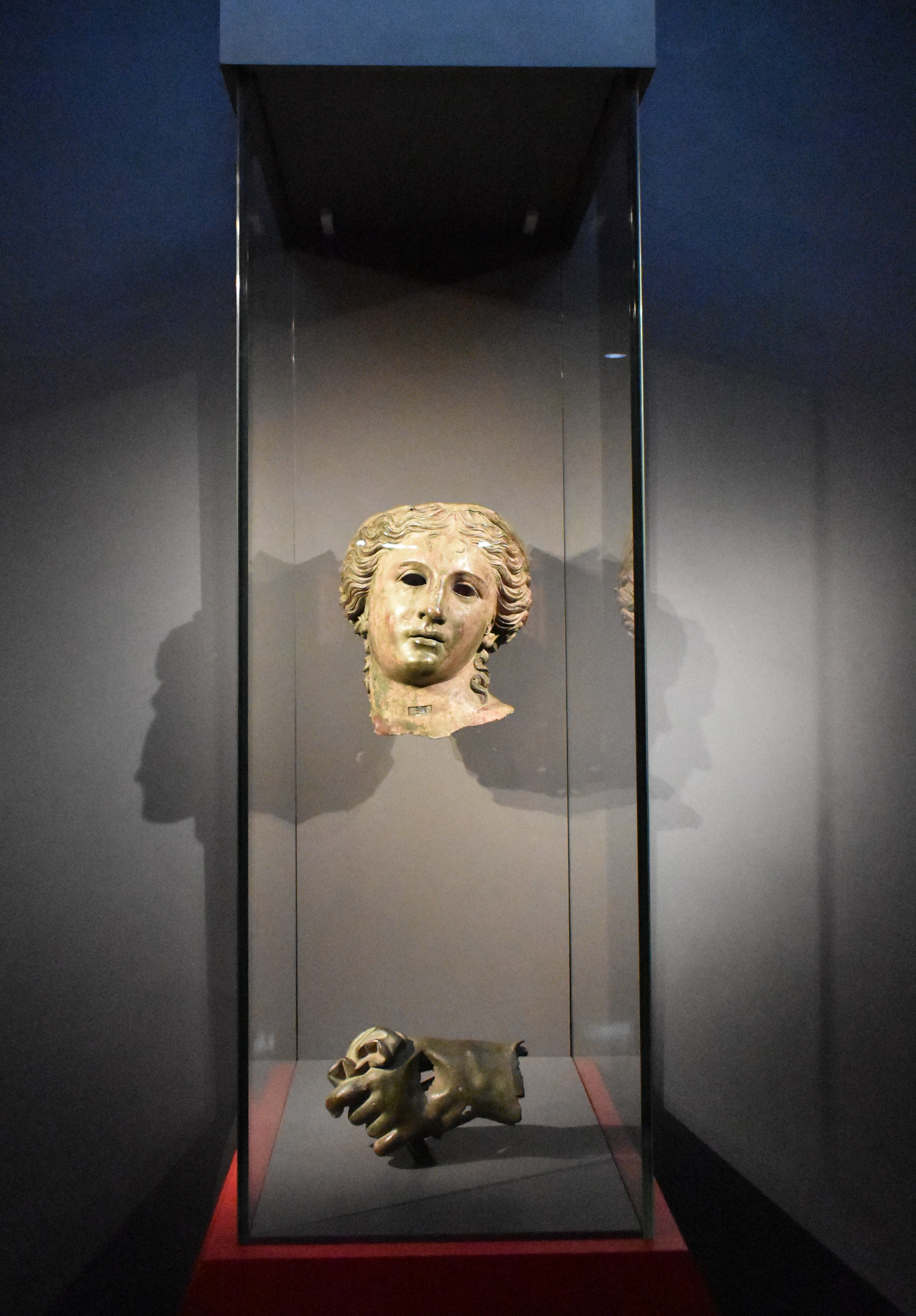
Exhibited at the History Museum of Armenia in 2025

Armenian authorities announced in January 2024 that the statue will be displayed in Armenia for the first time as a result of an agreement between the History Museum of Armenia and the British Museum. It was officially confirmed in April by Armenia's culture minister Zhanna Andreasyan and British ambassador John Gallagher. It was displayed at the History Museum in Yerevan as part of an exhibition entitled "Mother Goddess: From Anahit to Mary" from September 21, 2024, to March 21, 2025, later extended to April 10.

The statue was greeted at the History Museum by Gallagher and Andreasyan on September 16. Its transfer to the museum was live broadcast by Armenia's Public TV. Gallagher described it as a "landmark moment in British–Armenian cultural ties". He said the statue has an "enormous significance". Armenian President Vahagn Khachaturyan, Parliament Speaker Alen Simonyan, Prime Minister Nikol Pashinyan and his wife Anna Hakobyan attended the opening of the exhibition on September 21, the country's independence day. In a social media post, Pashinyan said, "Welcome back, Goddess". Armenian neopagans celebrated the "return" of Anahit with a ceremony at the Garni Temple. The exhibition attracted a total of 55,837 visitors.

== Exhibitions ==
The head has been displayed at the 1967 International and Universal Exposition in Montreal; at the British Library in 2001; in Manarat Al Saadiyat, Abu Dhabi in 2012; and Palazzo Strozzi, Florence in 2015. The replica from the History Museum of Armenia was displayed at Russia's State Historical Museum in Moscow in 2016. The original was exhibited at the History Museum of Armenia between September 21, 2024, and April 10, 2025.

== Bibliography ==
- Gunning, Lucia Patrizio (2022). "Cultural diplomacy in the acquisition of the head of the Satala Aphrodite for the British Museum". Journal of the History of Collections. 34 (2): 219–232. doi:10.1093/jhc/fhab025.
- Hewsen, Robert H. (2001). Armenia: A Historical Atlas. University of Chicago Press. ISBN 0-226-33228-4.
- Margaryan, Hasmik (2003). "Бронзовая голова Афродиты из Саталы [The Bronze Head of Aphrodite from Satala]". Patma-Banasirakan Handes (in Russian) (3): 235–246. Archived from the original on 2022-08-25.
- Melik-Pashayan, Karen (1963). Անահիտ դիցուհու պաշտամունքը [The Cult of the Goddess Anahit] (PDF) (in Armenian). Yerevan: Academy of Sciences of Armenian SSR. Archived from the original on 26 August 2022.
- Russell, James R. (1987). Zoroastrianism in Armenia. Harvard University Press. ISBN 0-674-96850-6.
