= Mastra mine =

Gold mine in Turkey

Coordinates: 40.501°N 39.387°E

Mastra Gold Mine
- Interactive map of Mastra Gold Mine
- Location: Gümüşhane Province,Turkey
- Products: Gold
- Company: Koza İpek Holding
- Website: http://kozaaltin.com.tr

The Mastra mine is a gold mine in Turkey. The mine is operated by the Turkish conglomerate Koza İpek Holding. The mine is located in Gümüşhane Province in eastern Turkey. It's the second oldest gold mine in country after Çukuralan mine.
