= Torul Dam =

Dam in Gümüşhane, Turkey

- Location within Turkey
- Official name: Torul Baraji
- Country: Turkey
- Location: Torul
- Coordinates: 40°38′07″N 39°13′52″E
- Status: Operational
- Construction began: 1998
- Opening date: 2007
- Owner: Turkish State Hydraulic Works

Dam and spillways
- Type of dam: Embankment, concrete-face rock-fill
- Impounds: Harşit River
- Height: 152 m (499 ft)
- Length: 320 m (1,050 ft)
- Elevation at crest: 921 m (3,022 ft)
- Dam volume: 4,300,000 m^{3} (5,624,188 cu yd)

Reservoir
- Total capacity: 168,000,000 m^{3} (136,200 acre⋅ft)
- Surface area: 3.62 km^{2} (1 mi^{2})

Torul Hydroelectric Station
- Coordinates: 40°38′39.54″N 39°11′9.11″E
- Commission date: 2008
- Type: Conventional, diversion
- Turbines: 2 x 60.75 MW Francis-type
- Installed capacity: 121.5 MW
- Annual generation: 322.28 GWh

The Torul Dam is a concrete-face rock-fill dam on the Harşit River located 10 km (6 mi) northwest of Torul in Gümüşhane Province, Turkey. The development was backed by the Turkish State Hydraulic Works. Construction on the dam began in 1998 and was completed in 2007. The dam's hydroelectric power plant was commissioned in 2008. Water is diverted through a tunnel and penstock on the river's north side where it reaches the power plant located about 4 km (2 mi) downstream. It has an installed capacity of 121.5 MW.

== See also ==
- Kürtün Dam
- List of dams and reservoirs in Turkey
