= Kürtün Dam =

- Location within Turkey
- Official name: Kürtün Baraji
- Country: Turkey
- Location: Kürtün
- Coordinates: 40°40′54″N 39°07′39″E
- Status: Operational
- Construction began: 1986
- Opening date: 2003
- Owner: Turkish State Hydraulic Works

Dam and spillways
- Type of dam: Embankment, concrete-face rock-fill
- Impounds: Harşit River
- Height: 133 m (436 ft)
- Length: 300 m (980 ft)
- Dam volume: 3,800,000 m^{3} (5,000,000 cu yd)

Reservoir
- Total capacity: 108,200,000 m^{3} (87,720 acre⋅ft)

Power Station
- Commission date: 2004
- Type: Conventional
- Turbines: 2 x 40 MW Francis-type
- Installed capacity: 80 MW

The Kürtün Dam is a concrete-face rock-fill dam on the Harşit River located 5 kilometres (3 mi) east of Kürtün in Gümüşhane Province, Turkey. The development was backed by the Turkish State Hydraulic Works. Construction began in 1986 and the reservoir started to fill in 2002. The dam was completed in 2003 and its underground power station became operational in 2004. The dam is connected with a 5.6 km-long (3.5 mi) road tunnel, constructed to link the dam site to Kürtün. The hydroelectric power station, located below and just downstream of the right abutment of the dam, has an installed capacity of 80 MW.

== See also ==
- Torul Dam
- List of dams and reservoirs in Turkey
