= Budak, Torul =

Budak
- Village
- Location in Turkey
- Coordinates: 40.6272°N 39.2979°E
- Country: Turkey
- Province: Gümüşhane
- District: Torul
- Population (2022): 170
- Time zone: UTC+3 (TRT)

Budak is a village in the Torul District, Gümüşhane Province, Turkey. Its population is 170 (2022).

== Geography ==
It is 38 km from Gümüşhane city and 18 km from Torul town. The surrounding villages are Silve, Köstere, Köprübaşı, Langas, Haşilya, Koryana.

== Population ==
Historical population
Year	Pop.	±% p.a.
1997	544	—
2007	294	−5.97%
2012	343	+3.13%
2017	132	−17.39%
2022	170	+5.19%
Source: 1997 census and TÜIK (2007-2022)
