= Yeniyol, Kelkit =

Yeniyol
- Village
- Location within Turkey
- Country: Turkey
- Province: Gümüşhane
- District: Kelkit
- Population (2022): 154
- Time zone: UTC+3 (TRT)

Yeniyol (formerly Pöske) is a village in the Kelkit District of Gümüşhane Province, Turkey. As of 2022, the population of the village is 154.

It is located in the Harşit Valley, on both sides of Gümüşhane-Bayburt road at the 17th kilometer. The river Harşit (which is parallel to the road) also divides the village into two parts.

The village regionally famous for its pestil(a dried fruit pulp), rose hip, sour apples, and vegetables.
