= Köse District =

District of Gümüşhane Province, Turkey

- District
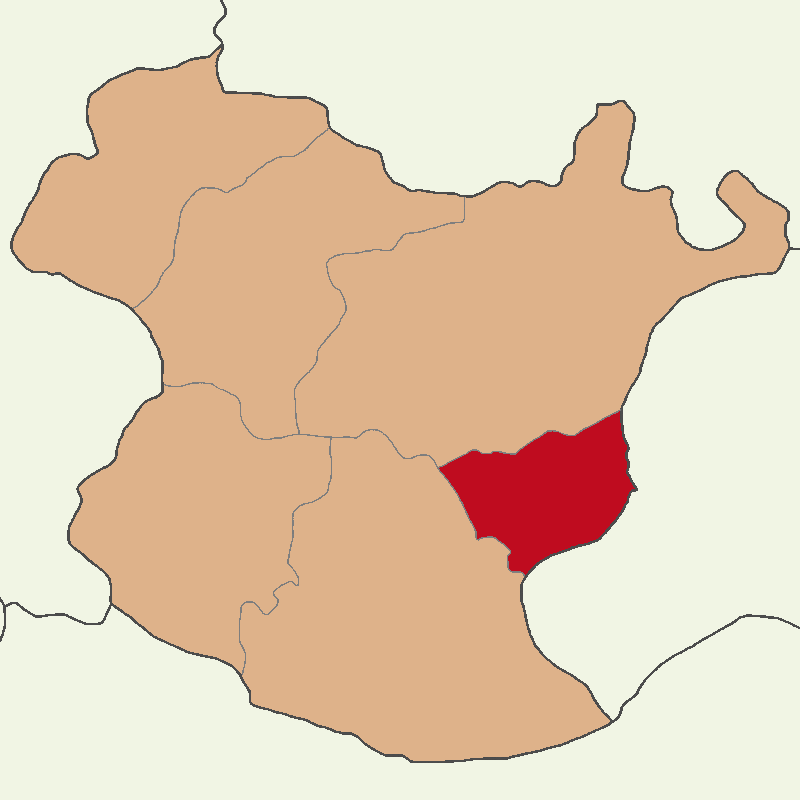
- Map showing Köse District in Gümüşhane Province

- Location in Turkey
- Coordinates: 40°13′N 39°39′E
- Country: Turkey
- Province: Gümüşhane
- Seat: Köse

Government
  - Kaymakam: Hatice Cemre İncesu
- Area: 353 km^{2} (136 sq mi)
- Population (2022): 6,830
  - Density: 19/km^{2} (50/sq mi)
- Time zone: UTC+3 (TRT)
- Website: www.kose.gov.tr

Köse District is a district of the Gümüşhane Province of Turkey. Its seat is the town of Köse. Its area is 353 km^{2}, and its population is 6,830 (2022).

== Composition ==
There is one municipality in Köse District:

- Köse

There are 14 villages in Köse District:

- Akbaba
- Altıntaş
- Bizgili
- Gökçeköy
- Kabaktepe
- Kayadibi
- Oylumdere
- Örenşar
- Övünce
- Özbeyli
- Salyazı
- Subaşı
- Yaylım
- Yuvacık
