= Sapmaz, Kürtün =

Sapmaz
- Village
- Location within Turkey
- Country: Turkey
- Province: Gümüşhane
- District: Kürtün
- Population (2022): 138
- Time zone: UTC+3 (TRT)

Sapmaz is a small village of Kürtün District of the Gümüşhane Province in Turkey. Its population is 138 (2022). Its former name was Gelivara, named after the Gelevara stream that flows through the town.
