= Torul District =

District of Gümüşhane Province, Turkey

- District
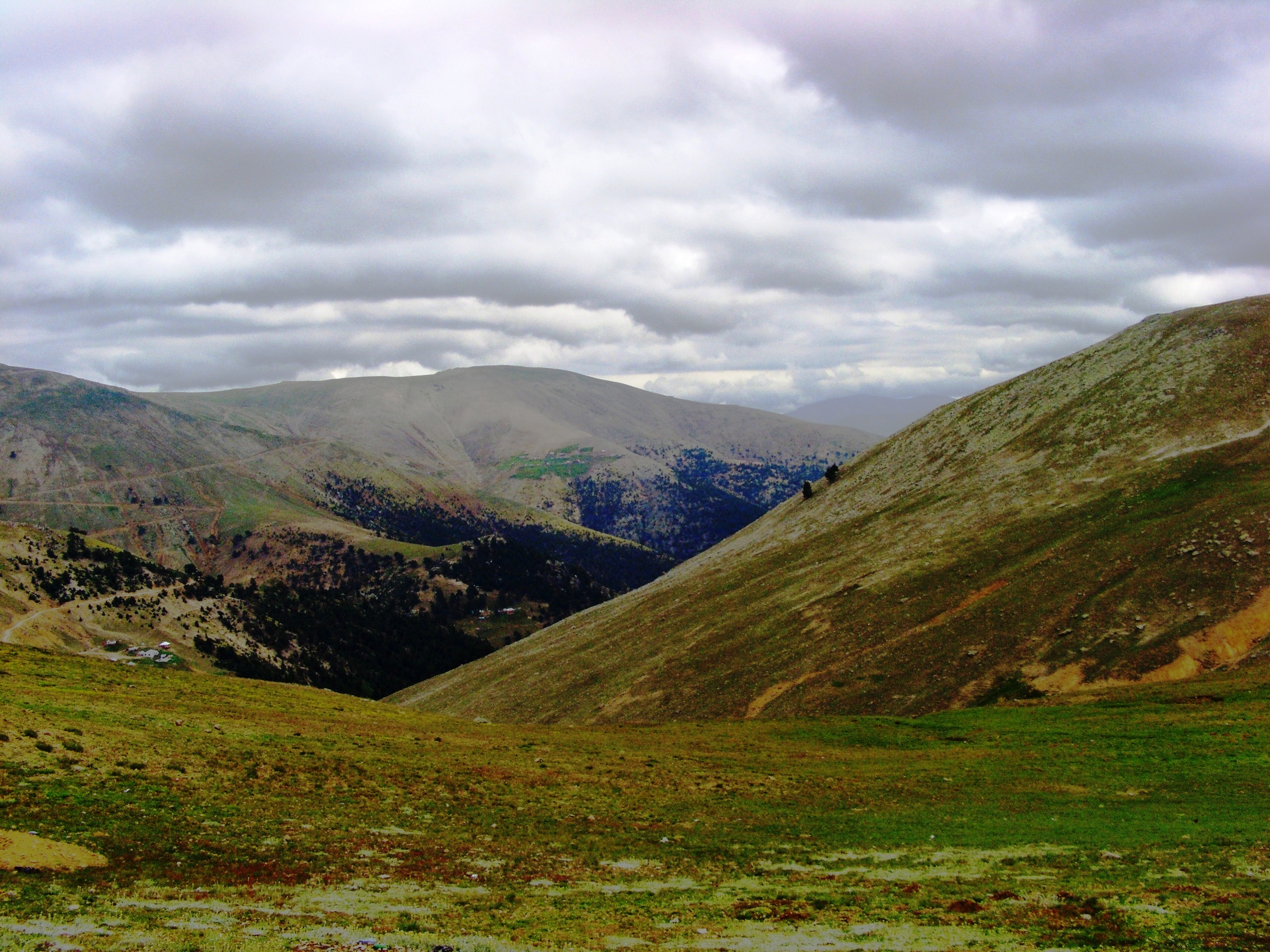
- A small nomadic settlement in Torul district

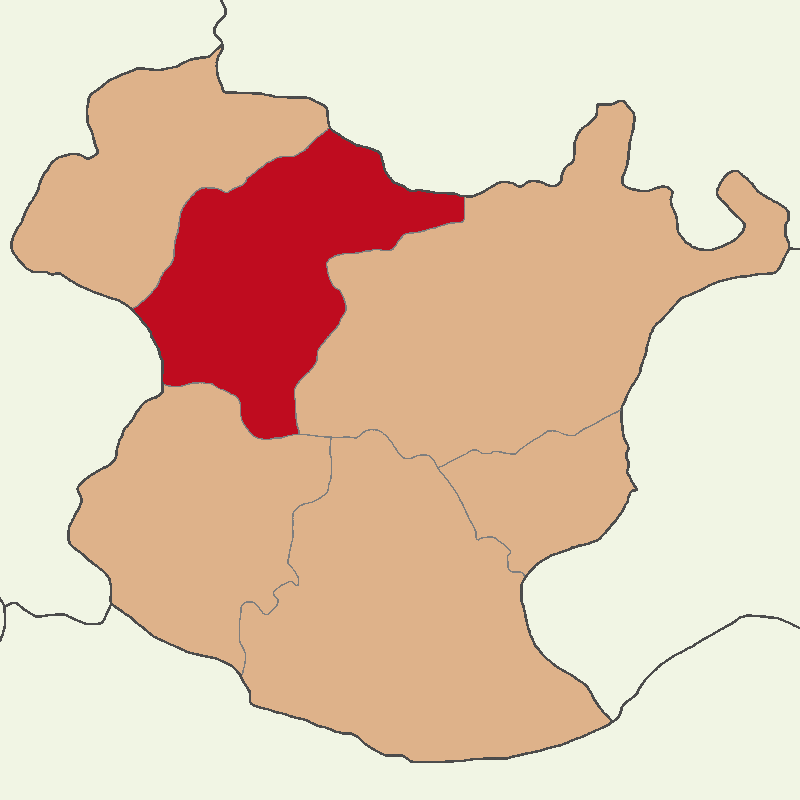
- Map showing Torul District in Gümüşhane Province

- Location within Turkey
- Coordinates: 40°33′N 39°18′E
- Country: Turkey
- Province: Gümüşhane
- Seat: Torul

Government
  - Kaymakam: Orhan Ayaz
- Area: 973 km^{2} (376 sq mi)
- Population (2022): 10,760
  - Density: 11.1/km^{2} (28.6/sq mi)
- Time zone: UTC+3 (TRT)
- Website: www.torul.gov.tr

Torul District is a district of the Gümüşhane Province of Turkey. Its seat is the town of Torul. Its area is 973 km^{2}, and its population is 10,760 (2022).

== Composition ==
There is one municipality in Torul District:

- Torul

There are 37 villages in Torul District:

- Aksüt
- Alınyayla
- Altınpınar
- Arılı
- Arpalı
- Atalar
- Bahçelik
- Budak
- Büyükçit
- Cebeli
- Dağdibi
- Dedeli
- Demirkapı
- Gülaçar
- Gümüştuğ
- Günay
- Güvemli
- Güzeloluk
- Harmancık
- Herek
- İlecik
- İnkılap
- Işık
- Kalecik
- Kirazlık
- Kocadal
- Kopuz
- Köstere
- Küçükçit
- Tokçam
- Uğurtaşı
- Yalınkavak
- Yeşilköy
- Yıldız
- Yurtköy
- Yücebelen
- Zigana
