= Kürtün District =

District of Gümüşhane Province, Turkey

- District
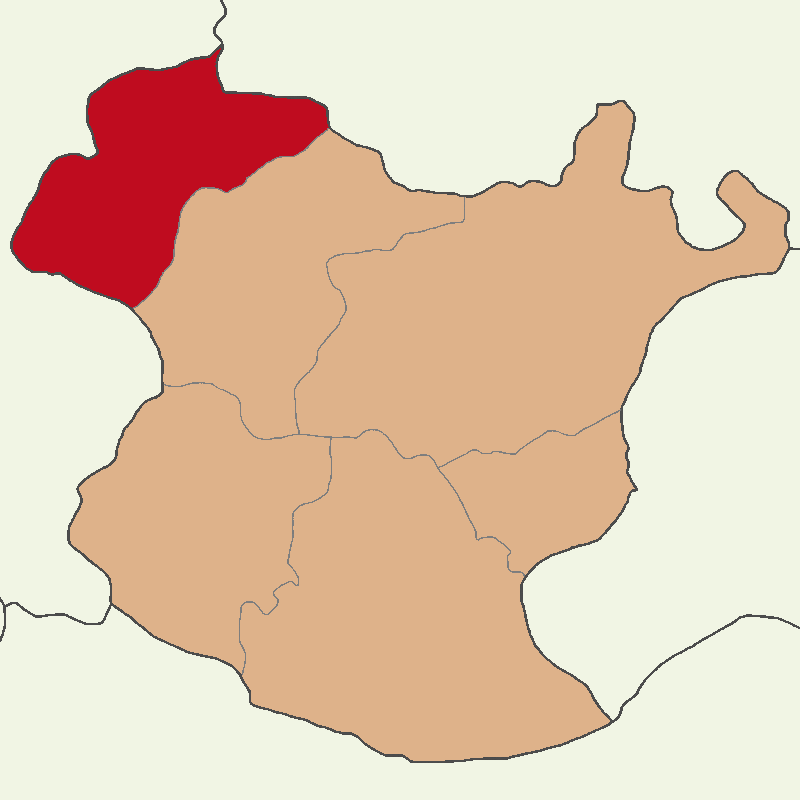
- Map showing Kürtün District in Gümüşhane Province

- Location in Turkey
- Coordinates: 40°40′N 39°08′E
- Country: Turkey
- Province: Gümüşhane
- Seat: Kürtün

Government
  - Kaymakam: Okan Dağlı
- Area: 917 km^{2} (354 sq mi)
- Population (2022): 11,913
  - Density: 13/km^{2} (34/sq mi)
- Time zone: UTC+3 (TRT)
- Website: www.kurtun.gov.tr

Kürtün District is a district of the Gümüşhane Province of Turkey. Its seat is the town of Kürtün. Its area is 917 km^{2}, and its population is 11,913 (2022).

== Composition ==
There are two municipalities in Kürtün District:

- Kürtün
- Özkürtün

There are 34 villages in Kürtün District:

- Akçal
- Aktaş
- Araköy
- Arpacık
- Aşağıkaradere
- Bağlama
- Beşirköy
- Beytarla
- Çayırçukur
- Damlı
- Demirciler
- Eğrigüney
- Ekinciler
- Elciğez
- Elmalı
- Göndere
- Gündoğdu
- Günyüzü
- Gürgenli
- Kırgeriş
- Kızılcadam
- Kızılot
- Konacık
- Kuşluk
- Sapmaz
- Sarıbaba
- Şendere
- Söğüteli
- Taşlıca
- Tilkicek
- Üçtaş
- Yaylalı
- Yeşilköy
- Yukarıkaradere
