= Babken Arakelyan =

Armenian historian and archaeologist

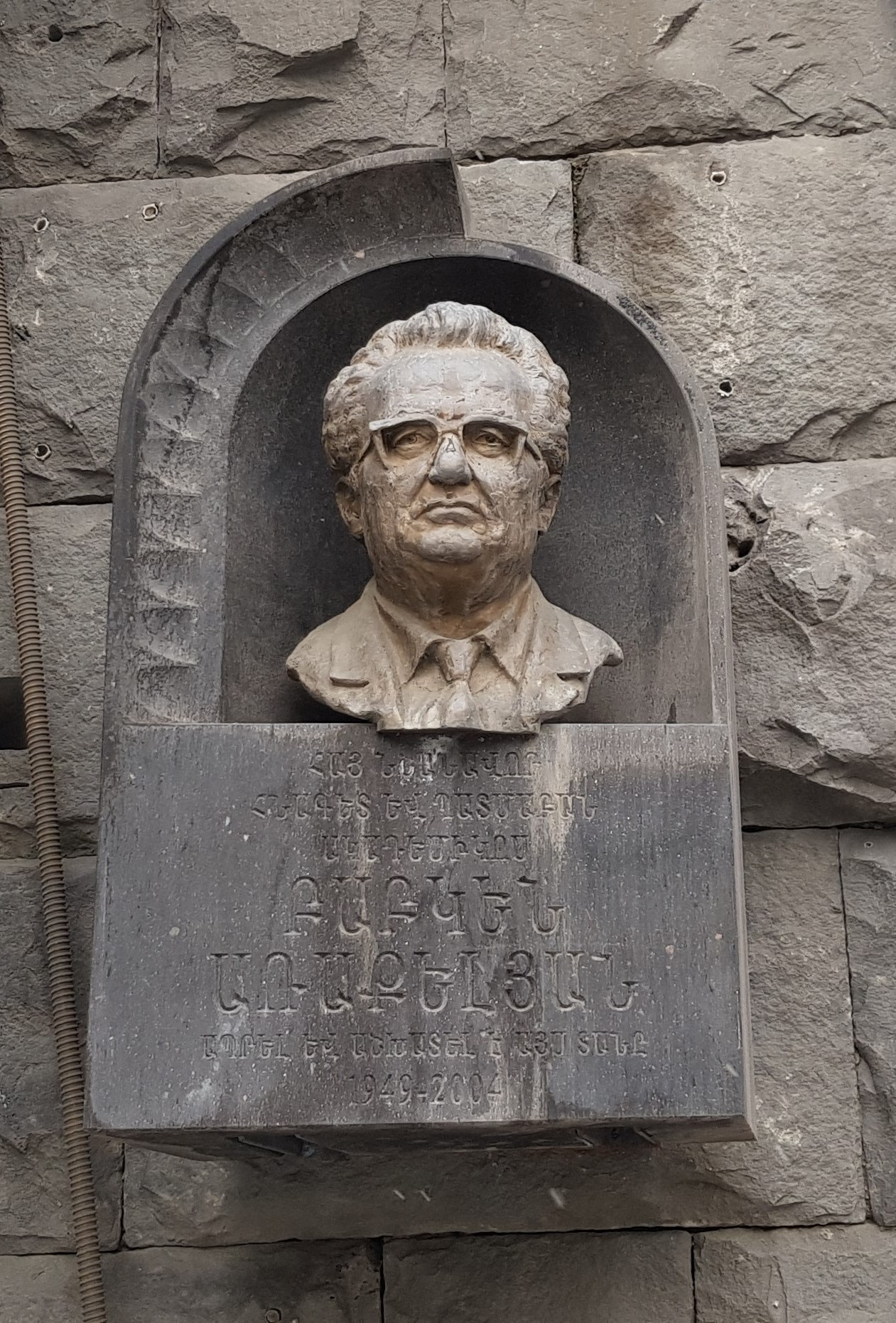
- Bust of Arakelyan on Mashtots Avenue, Yerevan
- Born: February 1, 1912; Gecherlu, Erivan Governorate, Russian Empire (present-day Mrgashat, Armenia)
- Died: August 16, 2004 (aged 92); Yerevan, Armenia
- Other names: Babken Nikoghosi Arakelyan
- Scientific career
- Fields: History, archaeology

Babken Nikolayi Arakelyan (Armenian: Բաբկեն Նիկոլայի Առաքելյան; February 1, 1912 – August 16, 2004) was an Armenian historian and archeologist. He specialized in ancient and medieval Armenian history, culture and art. He graduated from Yerevan State University in 1938. He was a professor and a full member (academician) of the Armenian Academy of Sciences since 1974. He headed the Institute of Archaeology and Ethnography between 1959 and 1990.
