= Harşit River =

River in the Black Sea Region of Turkey

Harşit

Location
- Country: Turkey

Physical characteristics
- Mouth: Black Sea
  - coordinates: 41°00′27″N 38°50′59″E

The Harşit River (Turkish: Harşit Çayı, Philabonites or Χαρσιώτης River) is a river in the Black Sea Region of Turkey. It flows through the Gümüşhane and Giresun Provinces before its terminus in the Black Sea at Tirebolu. It is interrupted by the Torul and Kürtün Dams.
