= Mrgashat =

Village in Armavir, Armenia

Mrgashat Մրգաշատ
- Location within Armenia
- Coordinates: 40°07′47″N 44°04′14″E
- Country: Armenia
- Province: Armavir

Population (2011)
  - Total: 4,993
- Time zone: UTC+4 ( )
  - Summer (DST): UTC+5 ( )

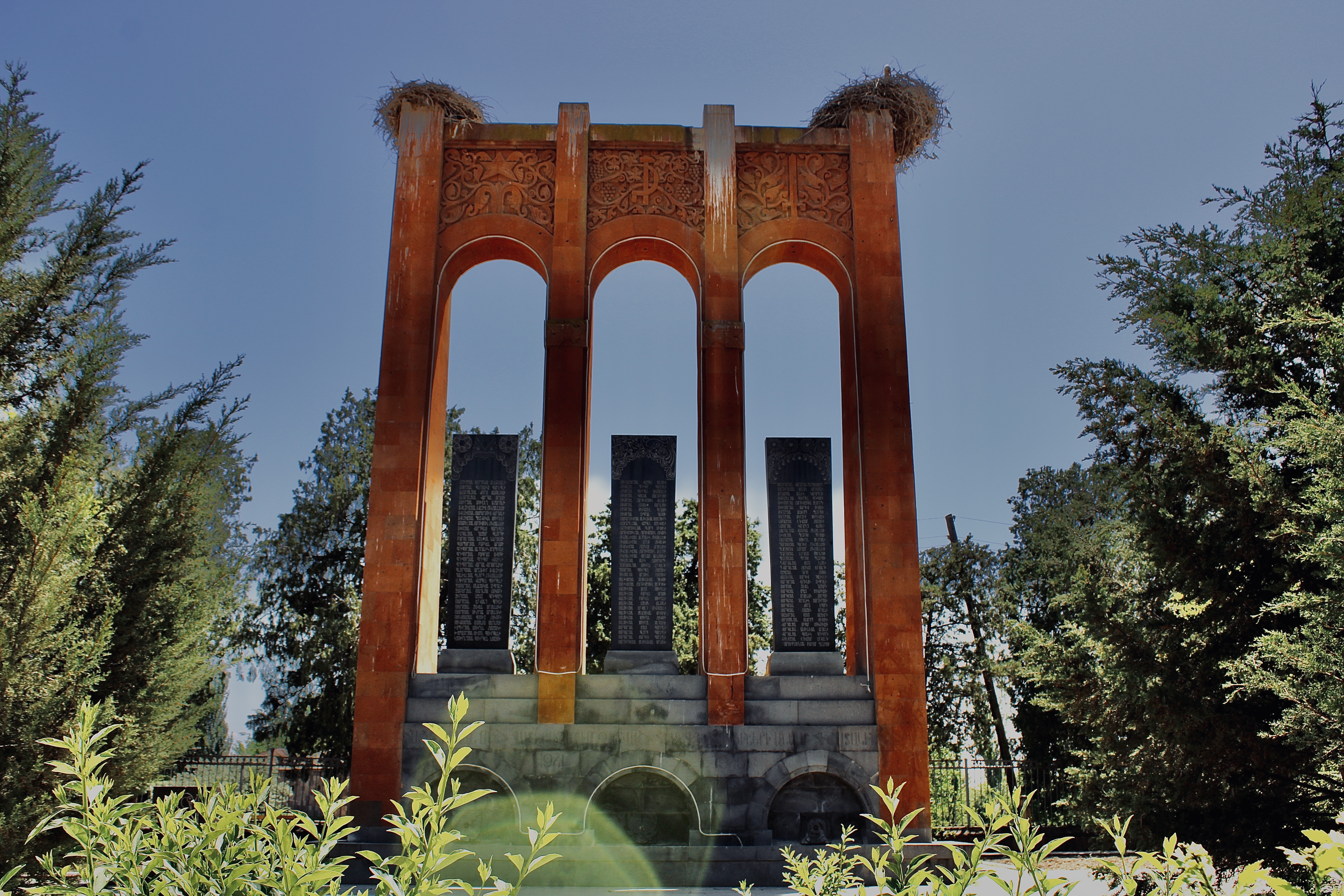
Mrgashat village

Mrgashat (Armenian: Մրգաշատ), is a major village in the Armavir Province of Armenia. A Bronze Age archaeological site is found near the village.

== See also ==
- Armavir Province
