= Köse =

- Municipality
- Location within Turkey
- Coordinates: 40°12′36″N 39°39′04″E
- Country: Turkey
- Province: Gümüşhane
- District: Köse

Government
  - Mayor: Turgay Kesler (MHP)
- Elevation: 1,553 m (5,095 ft)
- Population (2022): 5,283
- Time zone: UTC+3 (TRT)
- Postal code: 29650
- Area code: 0456
- Climate: Cfb
- Website: kose.bel.tr

Köse is a town in Gümüşhane Province in the Black Sea region of Turkey. It is the seat of Köse District. Its population is 5,283 (2022). The town lies at an elevation of 1,553 m (5,095 ft).
