= Deredolu =

- Municipality
- Location in Turkey
- Coordinates: 40°02′19″N 39°30′32″E
- Country: Turkey
- Province: Gümüşhane
- District: Kelkit
- Population (2022): 2,305
- Time zone: UTC+3 (TRT)

Deredolu is a town (belde) in the Kelkit District, Gümüşhane Province, Turkey. Its population is 2,305 (2022).
