= Öbektaş, Kelkit =

Öbektaş
- Municipality
- Location in Turkey
- Coordinates: 40°08′31″N 39°36′36″E
- Country: Turkey
- Province: Gümüşhane
- District: Kelkit
- Population (2022): 2,670
- Time zone: UTC+3 (TRT)

Öbektaş is a town (belde) in the Kelkit District, Gümüşhane Province, Turkey. Its population is 2,670 (2022).
