= Gümüşgöze, Kelkit =

Gümüşgöze
- Municipality
- Location in Turkey
- Coordinates: 40°11′17″N 39°22′16″E
- Country: Turkey
- Province: Gümüşhane
- District: Kelkit
- Population (2022): 2,935
- Time zone: UTC+3 (TRT)

Gümüşgöze is a town (belde) in the Kelkit District, Gümüşhane Province, Turkey. Its population is 2,935 (2022).
