= Çukuralan mine =

Gold mine in Turkey

Coordinates: 39.206°N 26.968°E

Çukuralan Gold Mine
- Interactive map of Çukuralan Gold Mine
- Location: İzmir Province,Turkey
- Products: Gold
- Company: Koza İpek Holding
- Website: http://kozaaltin.com.tr

The Çukuralan mine is a gold mine in Turkey. The mine is operated by the Turkish conglomerate Koza İpek Holding. The mine is located in İzmir Province in western Turkey. Construction of the mine was completed in 2011. Its an open pit operation that uses heap leaching for gold recovery.
