= Kelkit District =

District of Gümüşhane Province, Turkey

- District
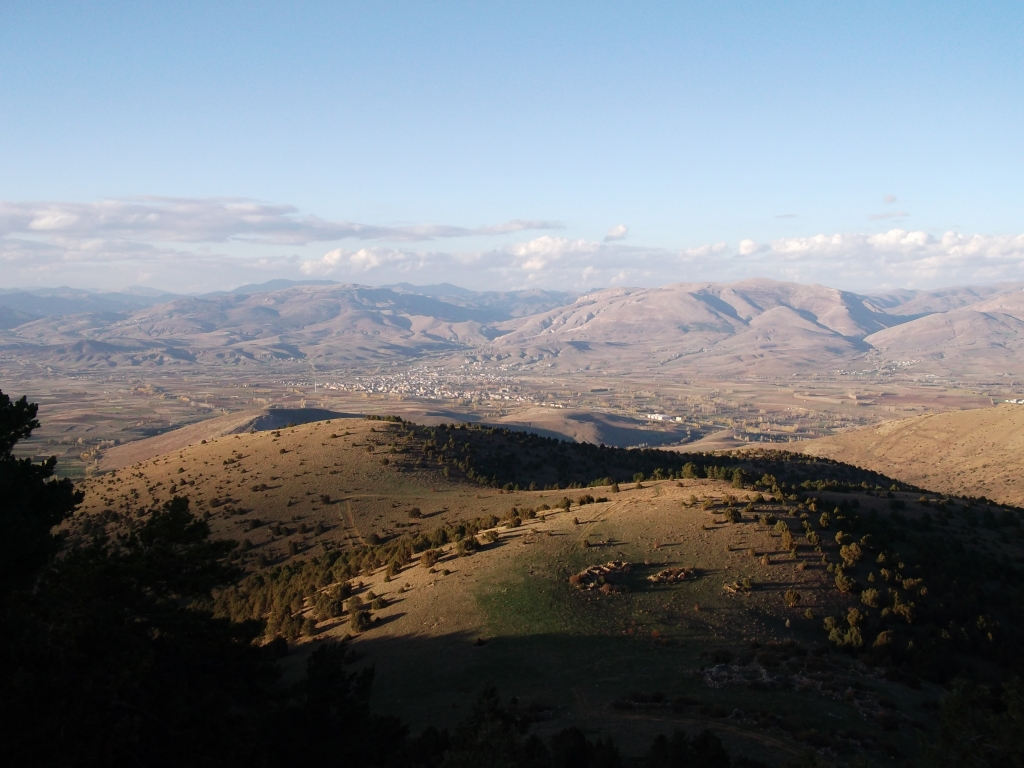
- Kelkit and environs

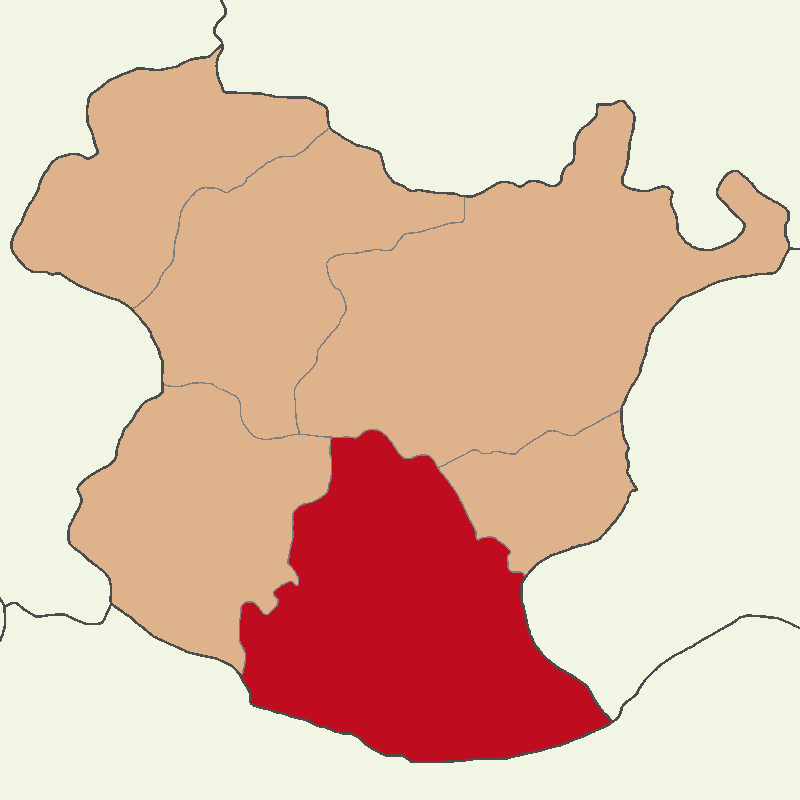
- Map showing Kelkit District in Gümüşhane Province

- Location within Turkey
- Coordinates: 40°08′N 39°26′E
- Country: Turkey
- Province: Gümüşhane
- Seat: Kelkit

Government
  - Kaymakam: Aziz Onur Aydın
- Area: 1,571 km^{2} (607 sq mi)
- Population (2022): 41,233
  - Density: 26.25/km^{2} (67.98/sq mi)
- Time zone: UTC+3 (TRT)
- Website: www.kelkit.gov.tr

Kelkit District is a district of the Gümüşhane Province of Turkey. Its seat is the town of Kelkit. Its area is 1,571 km^{2}, and its population is 41,233 (2022).

== Composition ==
There are six municipalities in Kelkit District:

- Deredolu
- Gümüşgöze
- Kelkit
- Öbektaş
- Söğütlü
- Ünlüpınar

There are 76 villages in Kelkit District:

- Ağılköy
- Ağlık
- Akdağ
- Aksöğüt
- Alaçat
- Aşağı Özlüce
- Aşut
- Aydoğdu
- Azizköy
- Babakonağı
- Balıklı
- Balkaya
- Başpınar
- Belenli
- Beşdeğirmen
- Bezendi
- Bindal
- Bulak
- Çağlar
- Çakırlar
- Çamurköy
- Cemallı
- Çimenli
- Çömlecik
- Dayısı
- Deliler
- Dereyüzü
- Devekorusu
- Doğanca
- Doğankavak
- Dölek
- Elmelik
- Eskikadı
- Eskiyol
- Eymür
- Gerdekhisar
- Güdül
- Güllüce
- Gültepe
- Günbatur
- Güneyçevirme
- Gürleyik
- Güzyurdu
- Karacaören
- Karşıyaka
- Kaş
- Kazanpınar
- Kılıçlı
- Kılıçtaşı
- Kınalıtaş
- Kızılca
- Kömürköy
- Köycük
- Kozoğlu
- Kuşluk
- Obalar
- Öğütlü
- Oğuzköy
- Örenbel
- Özen
- Sadak
- Salördek
- Sarışeyh
- Şenköy
- Sökmen
- Sütveren
- Tütenli
- Uzunkol
- Yarbaşı
- Yenice
- Yeniköy
- Yeniyol
- Yeşilpnar
- Yeşilyurt
- Yolçatı
- Yukarı Özlüce
