= Ünlüpınar =

- Municipality
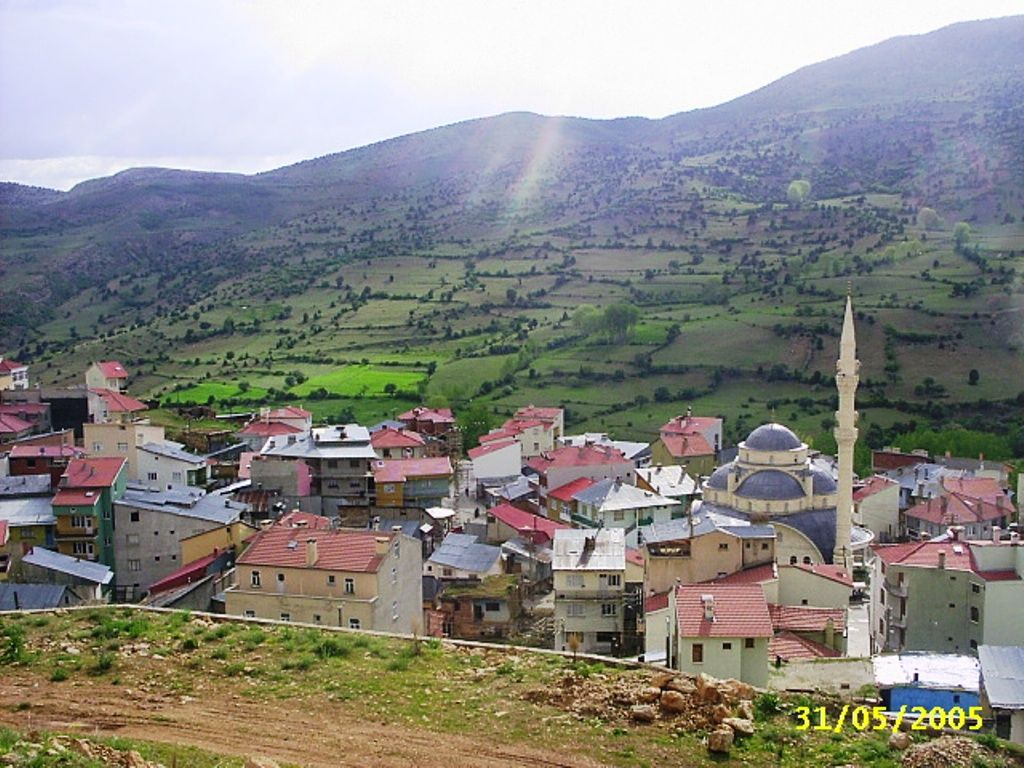
- Ünlüpınar

- Location within Turkey
- Coordinates: 40°12′28″N 39°26′09″E
- Country: Turkey
- Province: Gümüşhane
- District: Kelkit
- Population (2022): 2,542
- Time zone: UTC+3 (TRT)

Ünlüpınar is a town (belde) in the Kelkit District, Gümüşhane Province, Turkey. Its population is 2,542 (2022).
