= Özkürtün =

- Municipality
- Location in Turkey
- Coordinates: 40°40′11″N 39°08′23″E
- Country: Turkey
- Province: Gümüşhane
- District: Kürtün
- Population (2022): 2,275
- Time zone: UTC+3 (TRT)

Özkürtün is a town (belde) in the Kürtün District, Gümüşhane Province, Turkey. Its population is 2,275 (2022).
