= Kelkit =

- Municipality
- Logo

- Location within Turkey
- Coordinates: 40°07′43″N 39°26′18″E
- Country: Turkey
- Province: Gümüşhane
- District: Kelkit

Government
  - Mayor: Ünal Yilmaz (AKP)
- Elevation: 1,375 m (4,511 ft)
- Population (2022): 21,316
- Time zone: UTC+3 (TRT)
- Postal code: 29600
- Area code: 0456
- Climate: Dfb
- Website: www.kelkit.bel.tr

Kelkit (Turkish: Kelkit is a town in Gümüşhane Province in the Black Sea region of Turkey. It is the seat of Kelkit District. Its population is 21,316 (2022). The town lies at an elevation of 1,375 m (4,511 ft).

The name "Kelkit" comes from the Kelkit River, a major tributary of the Yeşil River, which flows into the Black Sea. The residents of the town are predominantly either farmers or small business owners.

== Archaeology ==
In November 2017, archaeologists announced the discovery of a 1,400-year-old Byzantine sarcophagus in the ancient village of Satala (current Sadak). According to researchers, there were Greek inscriptions on the cover saying "Blessed Kandes sleeps here". According to Gümüşhane Museum Director Gamze Demir, the broken part of the sarcophagus, which is considered to be 2.5 meters long is believed to be under the ground.
