= Söğütlü, Kelkit =

Söğütlü
- Municipality
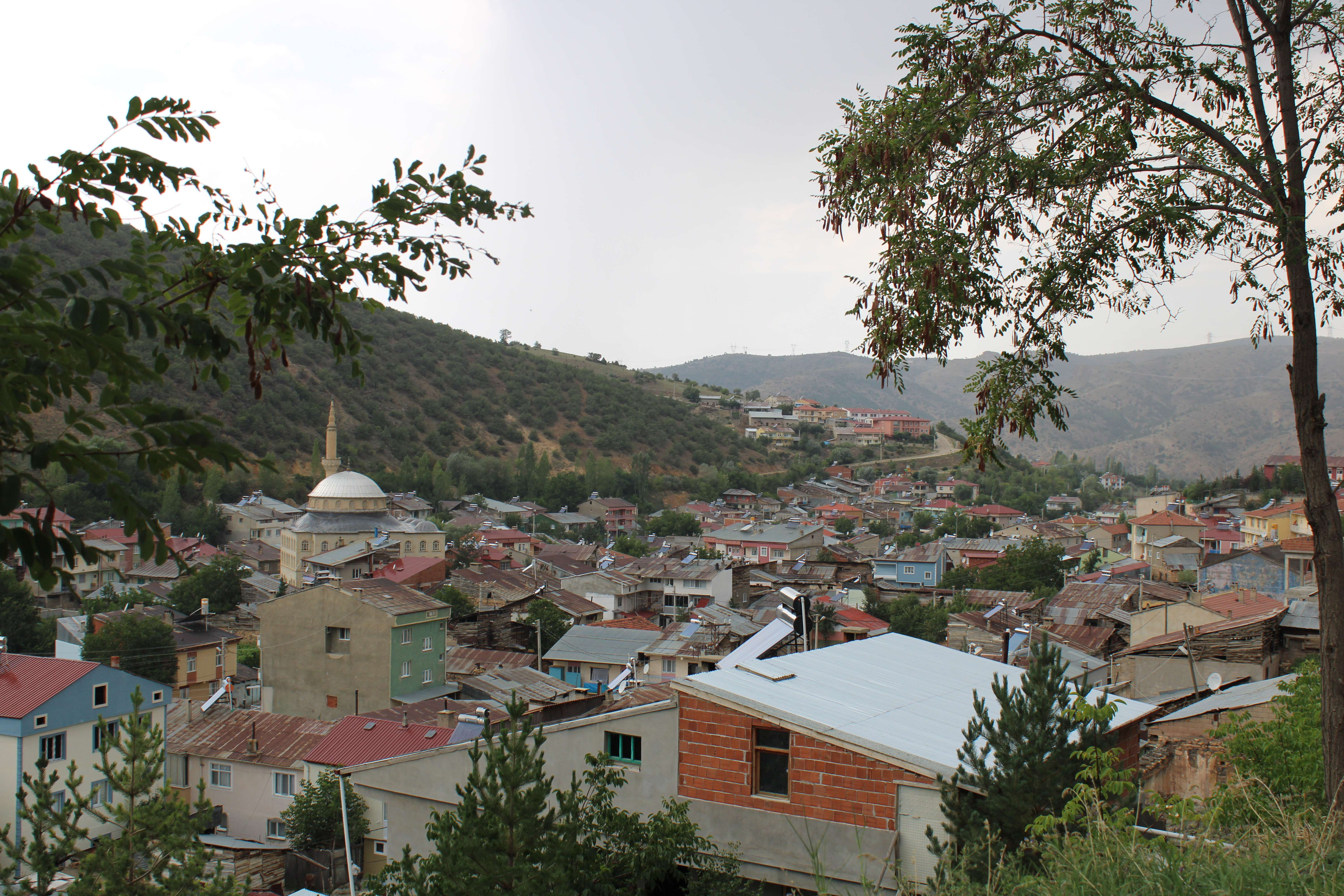
- Söğütlü

- Location within Turkey
- Coordinates: 40°05′06″N 39°15′18″E
- Country: Turkey
- Province: Gümüşhane
- District: Kelkit
- Population (2022): 2,207
- Time zone: UTC+3 (TRT)

Söğütlü is a town (belde) in the Kelkit District, Gümüşhane Province, Turkey. Its population is 2,207 (2022).
