= Kürtün =

- Municipality
- Location within Turkey
- Coordinates: 40°42′0″N 39°05′15″E
- Country: Turkey
- Province: Gümüşhane
- District: Kürtün

Government
  - Mayor: Ahmet Kanat (AKP)
- Elevation: 764 m (2,507 ft)
- Population (2022): 4,329
- Time zone: UTC+3 (TRT)
- Postal code: 29830
- Area code: 0456
- Climate: Cfb
- Website: www.kurtun.bel.tr

Kürtün is a town in Gümüşhane Province in the Black Sea region of Turkey. It is the seat of Kürtün District. Its population is 4,329 (2022). The town lies at an elevation of 764 m (2,507 ft).
