= Satala =

Location in Turkey

Sadak Satala
- Village
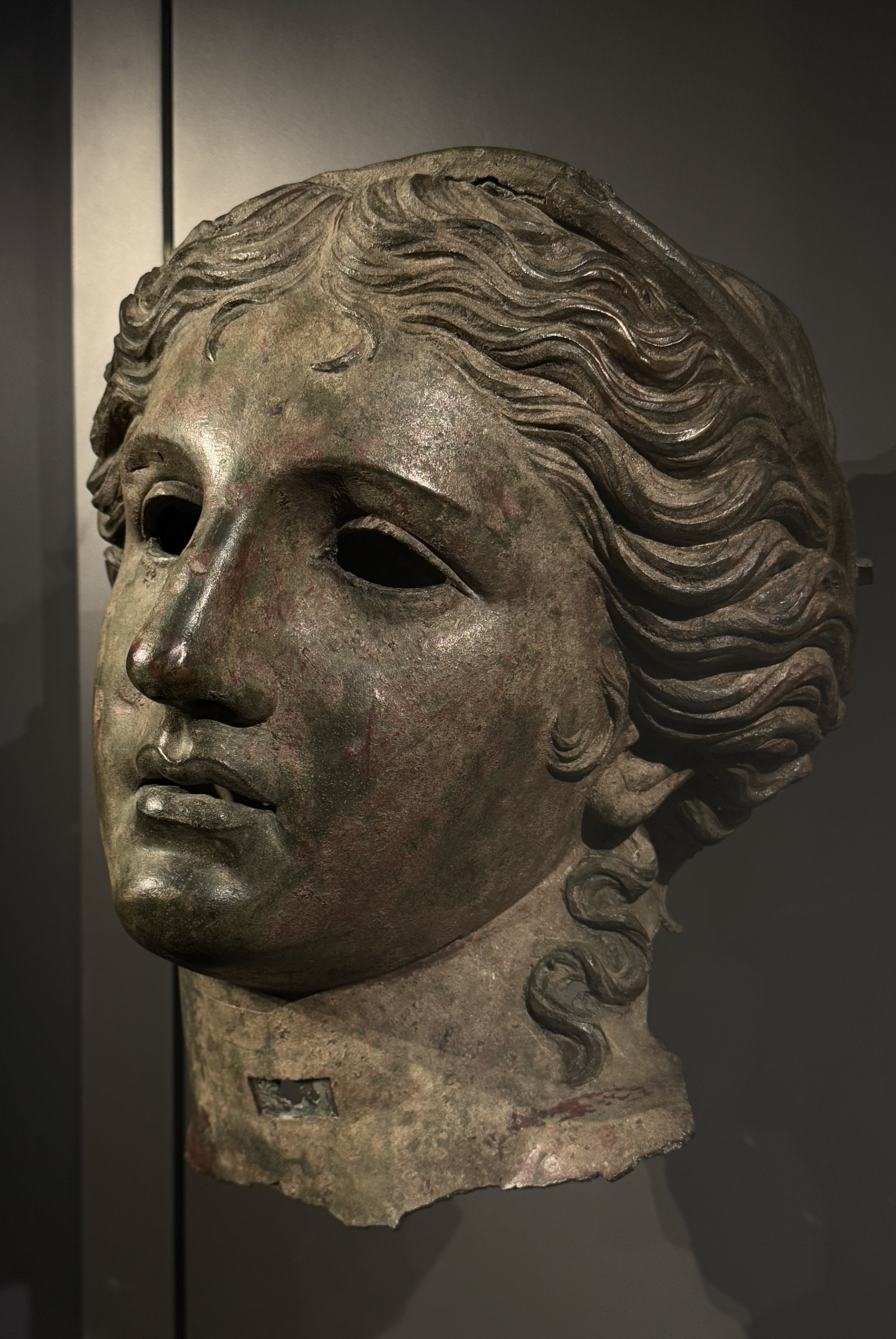
- Satala Aphrodite as displayed in the British Museum

- Location within Turkey
- Coordinates: 40°1′34″N 39°35′41″E
- Country: Turkey
- Province: Gümüşhane
- District: Kelkit
- Population (2022): 348
- Time zone: UTC+3 (TRT)

Located in Turkey, the settlement of Satala (Old Armenian: Սատաղ Satał, Ancient Greek: Σάταλα), according to the ancient geographers, was situated in a valley surrounded by mountains, a little north of the Euphrates, where the road from Trapezus to Samosata crossed the boundary of the Roman Empire, when it was a bishopric, which remains a Latin Catholic titular see. Later it was connected with Nicopolis by two highways. Satala is now Sadak, a village of 348 inhabitants (2022), in the Kelkit District of Gümüşhane Province in Turkey.

== History ==
This site must have been occupied as early as the annexation of Lesser Armenia under Vespasian. Trajan visited it in 115 and received the homage of the princes of the Caucasus and the Euxine. Probably it was Trajan who placed there the Legio XV Apollinaris and began the construction of the great castra stativa (permanent camp) which it was to occupy till the 5th century. The town must have sprung up around this camp; in the time of Ptolemy it was already important. In 530 the Persians were defeated by the Byzantine Empire under its walls. Justinian I constructed more powerful fortifications there, but these did not prevent Satala from being captured in 607-8 by the Persians.

In the Middle Ages and Ottoman period an important east-west route between Erzurum and Sivas or Tokat ran past Satala; however by that time Satala had ceased being an important settlement.

== Ecclesiastical history ==
In the Late Roman province of Armenia Prima, Satala was a suffragan of its capital Sebaste's Metropolitan Archbishop.

The Christians were already numerous in the time of Diocletian. Le Quien seven of its bishops:

- Euethius, at Nicaea, 325
- Elpidius, 360
- Poemenius, about 378
- Anatolius, 451
- Epiphanius, 458
- Gregory, 692
- Philip, 879.

The see is mentioned in the Notitiae episcopatuum until the thirteenth century; the name of the bishop in 1256 is recorded as Cosmas.

=== Titular see ===
In the 18th century, the diocese was nominally restored as Titular bishopric of Satala. As such it had the following incumbents, all of the fitting episcopal (lowest) rank :

- Isaac Soffiali (1785.01.07 – ?)
- Ignacy Bardziński (1809.03.27 – 1813.12.15)
- Nikodem Puzyna (1814.09.26 – 1819.10.22)
- Gianfrancesco Guglielmo Tippmann (1832.12.17 – 1857.06.20)
- Vital-Justin Grandin, Missionary Oblates of Mary Immaculate (O.M.I.) (1857.12.11 – 1871.09.22)
- Tommaso Teofilo Kulinski (1872.02.23 – 1883.03.15)
- Lazzaro Mladenoff, Lazarists (C.M.) (1883.06.12 – 1918.03.04)

In 1933 it was renamed Satala in Armenia. It is vacant, having had as such the following incumbents, so far also all of the fitting episcopal (lowest) rank :

- François-Joseph Dantin, Missionaries of Our Lady of LaSalette (M.S.) (1918.08.24 – 1941.07.05)
- Salvador Herrera y Pinto, Friars Minor (O.F.M.) (1948.04.05 – 1977.01.26)

== Its rediscovery ==
Satala, then called Sadagh or Suddak, was visited by J. G. Taylor in 1868: he copied a damaged Latin inscription mentioning Domitian found on a Roman votive altar; found a large figurative mosaic fragment, a "magnificent specimen", being reused as the base of a fireplace; found more and larger mosaic fragments scattered about the village (all of them having been dug out of the top of a hill overlooking the village); and reported the existence of Byzantine epitaph inscriptions. Taylor reported that cut stones had been removed from the site to construct government buildings at Erzincan.

The first detailed investigation of the site was by Alfred Biliotti, the British vice-consul at Trebizond. He visited Satala in September 1874 as a response to the finding of bronze statue fragments including the piece now known as the Satala Aphrodite, producing a description of the site and a plan of the ruins. Lightfoot considers Biliotti's account to be "by far the most accurate and valuable description of the remains at Satala". Although Sadagh was assumed by Taylor to be the site of Satala, and indicated as such by Kiepert in his maps, the site's identification as Satala was not conclusively established until 1894 when two British scholars, Vincent Yorke and D. G. Hogarth, found several tiles at the site bearing the stamp of Legio XV Apollinaris. Yorke described Satala in 1894 as a Turkish village of about 150 houses, constructed mostly from reused stone blocks. Yorke identified as an aqueduct a 5-arched structure that Biliotti had identified as part of a basilica church and Taylor as part of a bathhouse, a misidentification that continued into the 1990s.

== Archaeological remains ==
Some remains of the walls of the rectangular legionary fortress survive, though much ruined. Their line can be traced in part on all four sides of the fortress that encompassed an area of 15.7 ha (smaller than most legionary fortresses). These walls probably date from the 6th century AD when, according to Procopius, Satala's fortifications were extensively rebuilt by Justinian, but in places they reuse the foundations of earlier walls. Within the walls little remains, and ruined structures noted by Biliotti have been demolished. The legionary base had a civilian settlement to the north of the north wall, but no traces of any substantial buildings survive. A ruinous structure consisting of a row of arches stands at some distance to the southeast of the fortress. Biliotti described it as a basilica, but since then it was frequently regarded as the remains of an aqueduct leading to an as yet unidentified lower city. This theory is now considered obsolete and the ruin has been reconfirmed as that of a basilica church. Lightfoot speculates that it might have been a martyrium church dedicated to the patron saint of Satala, St. Eugenius.

The famous Satala Aphrodite, a larger than life-size head from an ancient Hellenistic bronze statue, was found in a field outside Sadak in 1872. It is now on display in the British Museum.

In November 2017, archaeologists announced the discovery of a 1400 year-old Byzantine sarcophagus in Sadak in Satala. According to researchers, there were Greek inscriptions on the cover saying "Blessed Kandes sleeps here". According to Gümüşhane Museum Director Gamze Demir, the broken part of the sarcophagus, which is considered to be 2.5 meters long is believed to be under the ground.

== Sources and external links ==
- Livius.org: Satala
- GCatholic with titular incumbent bio links
- Kroll, S.; M. Roaf; St J. Simpson; T. Sinclair; R. Talbert; T. Elliott; S. Gillies (8 June 2018). "Places: 874684 (Satala)". Pleiades.
