= Torul =

- Municipality
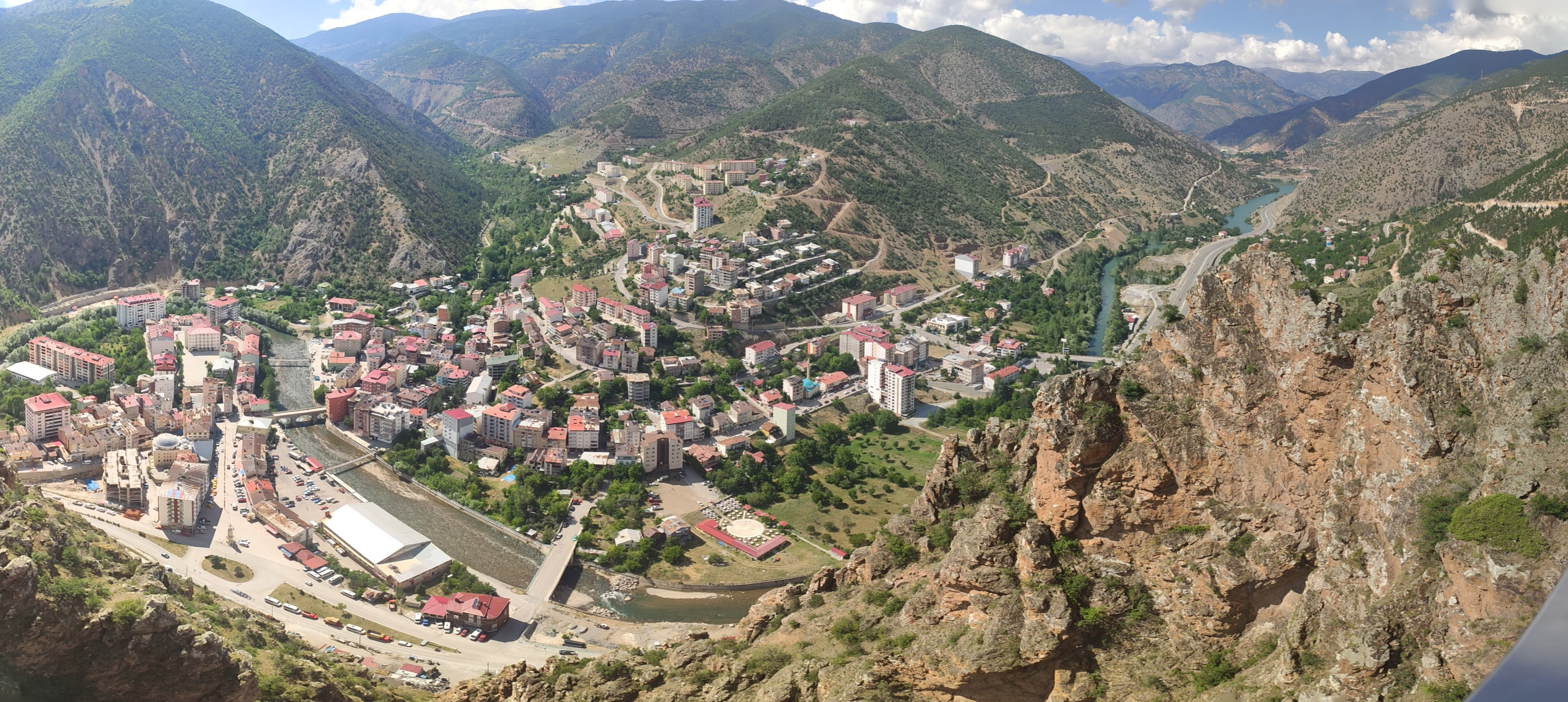

- Location within Turkey
- Coordinates: 40°33′26″N 39°17′31″E
- Country: Turkey
- Province: Gümüşhane
- District: Torul

Government
  - Mayor: Evren Evrim Özdemir (MHP)
- Elevation: 1,020 m (3,350 ft)
- Population (2022): 5,794
- Time zone: UTC+3 (TRT)
- Postal code: 29800
- Area code: 0456
- Climate: Cfb
- Website: www.torul.bel.tr

Torul is a town in Gümüşhane Province in the Black Sea Region of Turkey. It is the seat of Torul District. Its population is 5,794 (2022). The town lies at an elevation of 1,020 m (3,346 ft).

== See also ==
- Zigana Pass
