= Gümüşhane Province =

Province of Turkey

Gümüşhane Province Gümüşhane ili
- Province
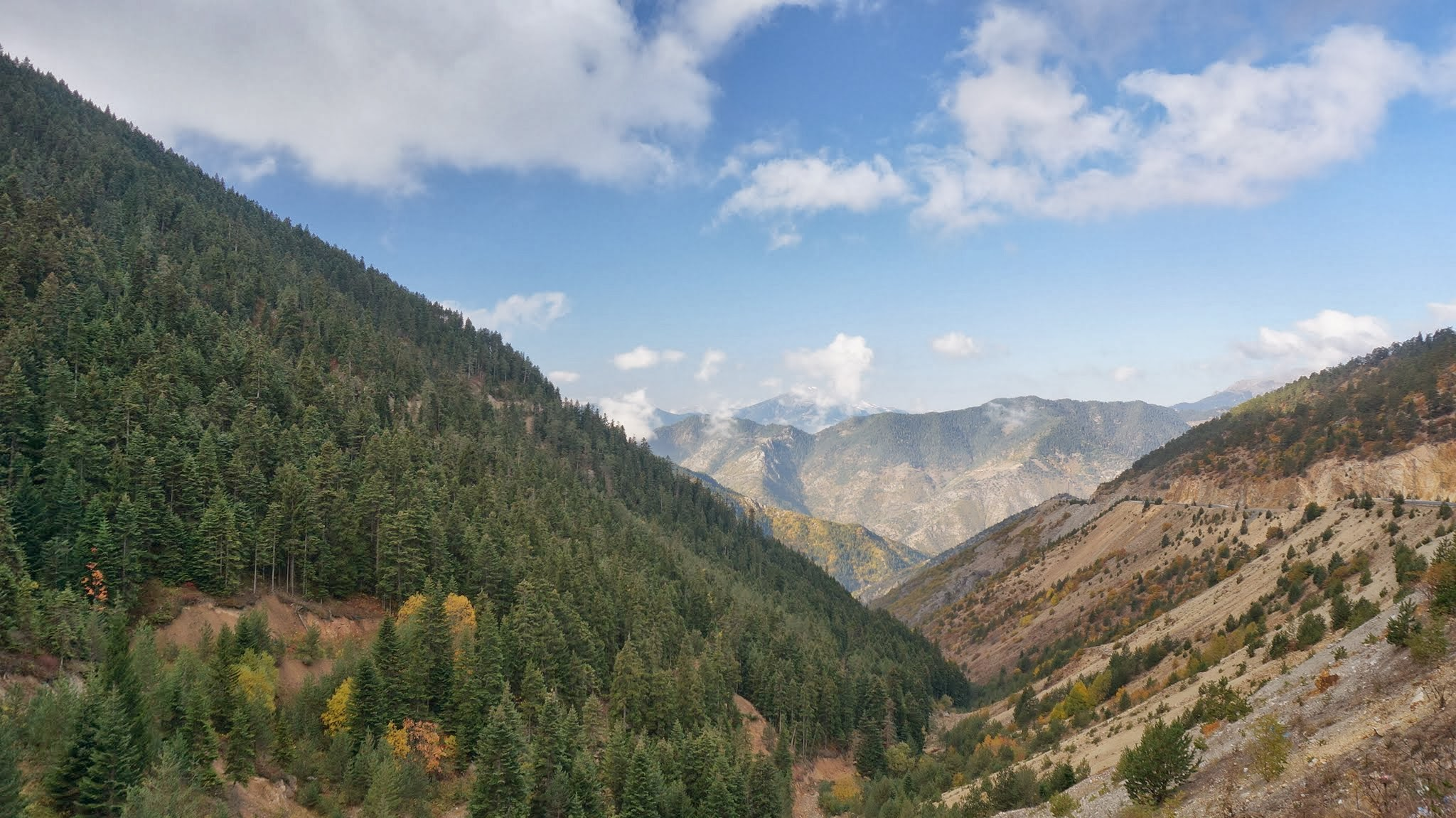

- Location of the province within Turkey
- Coordinates: 40°23′17″N 39°25′07″E
- Country: Turkey
- Seat: Gümüşhane

Government
  - Governor: Cevdet Atay
- Area: 6,668 km^{2} (2,575 sq mi)
- Population (2022): 144,544
  - Density: 21.68/km^{2} (56.14/sq mi)
- Time zone: UTC+3 (TRT)
- Area code: 0456
- ISO 3166 code: TR-29
- Website: www.gumushane.gov.tr

Gümüşhane Province (Turkish: Gümüşhane ili) is a province in northern Turkey, bordering Bayburt to the east, Trabzon to the north, Giresun and Erzincan to the west. Its area is 6,668 km^{2}, and its population is 144,544 (2022). The population was 186,953 in 2000. Gümüşhane is the capital city of the province. The name Gümüşhane means silver house. The city has a rich mining (silver and bronze) history and was the source of exports for Trabzon. The current Governor is Alper Tanrısever, appointed in August 2023.

== History ==
In September 1935 the third Inspectorate General (Umumi Müfettişlik, UM) was created. Its creation was based on the Law 1164 from June 1927, which was passed in order to Turkify the local Greek Muslim population. The third UM span over the provinces of Erzurum, Artvin, Rize, Trabzon, Kars Gümüşhane, Erzincan and Ağrı. It was governed by an Inspector General seated in the city of Erzurum. The Inspectorate General was dissolved in 1952 during the Government of the Democrat Party. In 1989 Bayburt Province was created from part of Gümüşhane Province.

=== Archaeology ===
In November 2017, archaeologists announced the discovery of a 1400-year-old Byzantine sarcophagus in the antique village of Sadak in Satala in Kelkit. According to researchers, there were Greek inscriptions on the cover saying "Blessed Kandes sleeps here". According to Gümüşhane Museum Director Gamze Demir, the broken part of the sarcophagus, which is considered to be 2.5 meters long, is believed to be under the ground.

== Geography ==
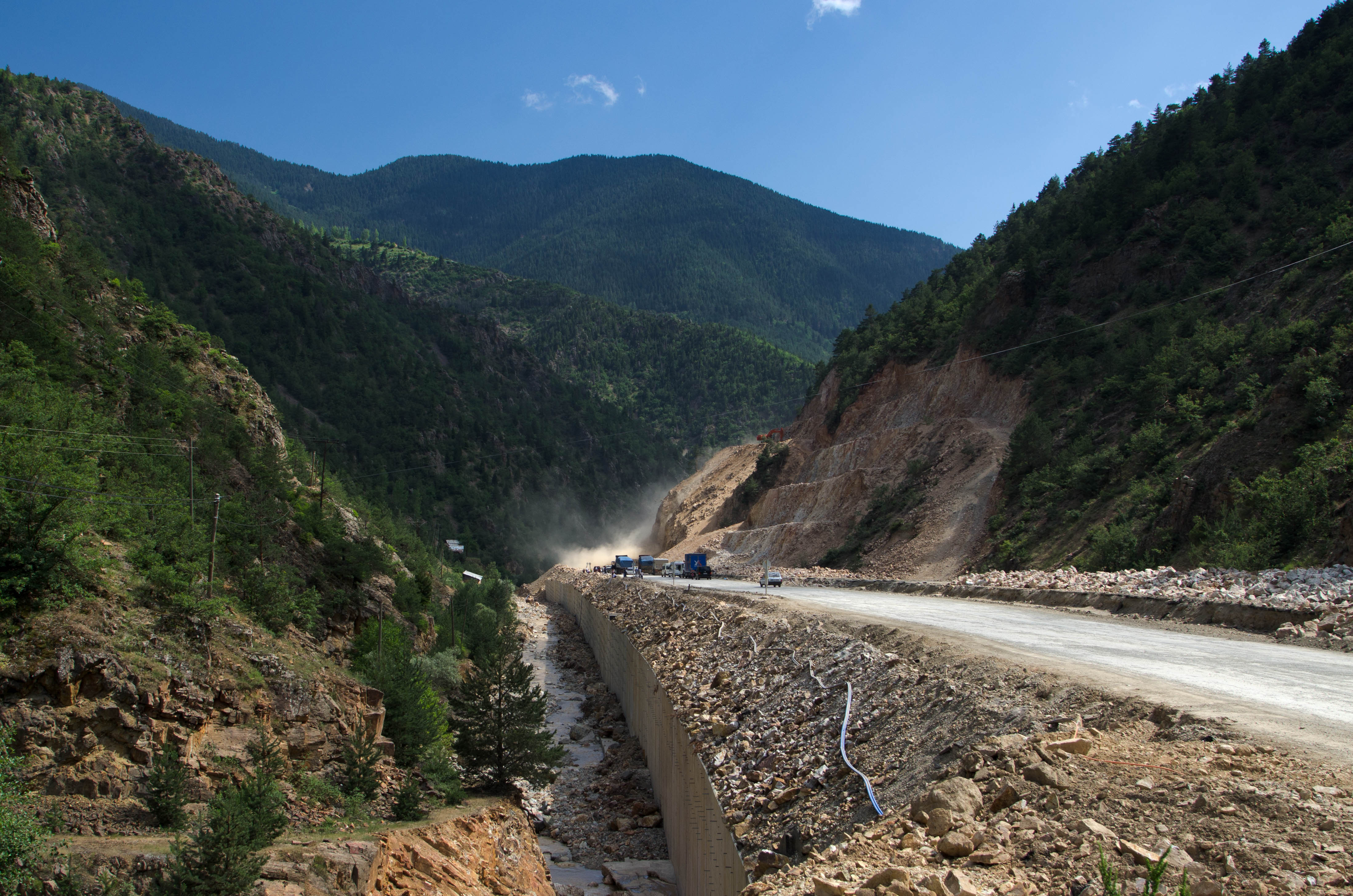
Gümüşhane-Trabzon road

Gümüşhane is surrounded by high mountains, Zigana-Trabzon Mountains to the north, Çimen Mountains to the south, Giresun Mountains to the west and Pulur, Soğanlı Mountains to the east. Trekking is popular sport is at these mountains. The Zigana Mountain has a ski center on it and it is a well known touristic place for winter sports. Abdal Musa Peak (3331 m.) is the highest peak within it. The main trees in the forests are Scotch pine and fir, and there are many animals and birds in the area. There are many lakes such as Karanlık Göl, Beş Göller, Artebel Gölü, Kara Göller which are at the peak of Gavurdağı Mountain, and are preserved as natural parks. Mountainous territory comprises 56% of the total area of Gümüşhane province.

=== Districts ===
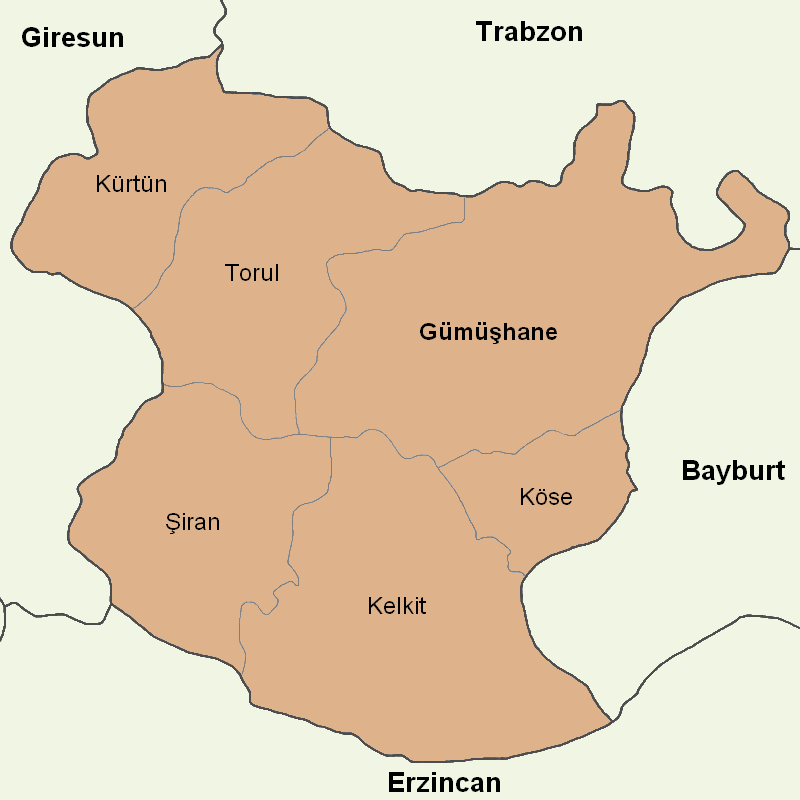

Gümüşhane province is divided into six districts (capital district in bold):

- **Gümüşhane**
- Kelkit
- Köse
- Kürtün
- Şiran
- Torul

== Economy ==
Historically, the province had silver mines. However, production ceased due to deforestation by 1920.

== Gallery ==
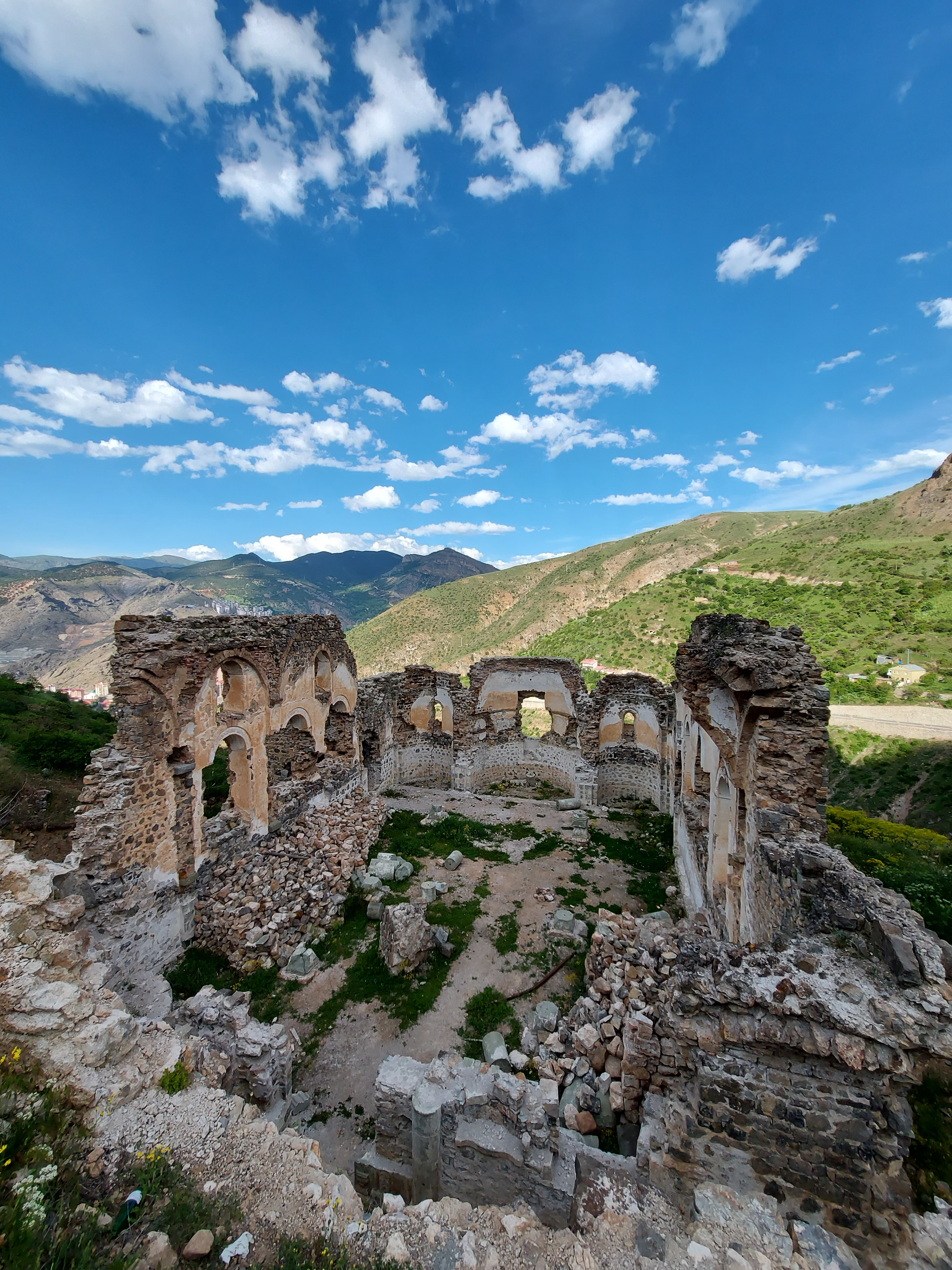
Ruins of the Hegios Georgios Church in Süleymaniye village near Gümüşhane city.

== See also ==
- 2009 Zigana avalanche
- Zigana Pass
- List of populated places in Gümüşhane Province
