= Salang =

Salang may refer to:

== Places ==
- Salang, Aceh, Indonesia
- Salang, Nepal, a town in Nepal
- Salang, Malaysia, a tourist village, bay, and beach at Tioman Island
- Salangbato, a barangay in Famy, Philippines

=== Afghanistan ===
- North Salang, a village in Baghlan Province
- Salang District, a district of Parwan Province
- Salang mountains, in Parwan and Baghlan Provinces
- Salang Pass, major mountain pass connecting Parwan and Baghlan provinces
- Salang River, a tributary of the Ghorband River
- Salang Tunnel, a tunnel at the Salang Pass in the Hindu Kush mountains

=== Norway ===
- Salangen Municipality, a municipality in Troms county
  - Salangsverket, a village and industrial site in the municipality of Salangen
- Salangsdalen, a river valley in the municipality of Bardu in Troms county

== Other uses ==
- Salang (language), a language spoken in Laos and Vietnam
