= Zigana =

Zigana may refer to:

- Zigana Pass (Turkish: Zigana Geçidi), a mountain pass in the Pontic Mountains og northeastern Anatolia, Turkey
  - Zigana Tunnel (1988), through the pass
  - Zigana Tunnel (2023), through the pass
  - 2009 Zigana avalanche
- Curiate Italian for Zygana, a former bishopric and present Latin Catholic titular see at Cobuleti in Lazica, now in Georgia
- Zigana (pistol), an automatic pistol produced by Turkish firearm manufacturing company TİSAŞ

== See also ==
- Zygaena, a genus of moths typical for the family Zygaenidae
- Pronous, a genus of spiders with the synonym "Zigana"
