= List of avalanches by death toll =

This is an incomplete list of notable avalanches by death toll.

Deaths	Event	Location	Date	Ref.
30,000	Huascarán avalanche; triggered by the 1970 Ancash earthquake	Peru	1970	
2,000-10,000	White Friday (1916)	Italy	1916	
310	2015 Afghanistan avalanches	Afghanistan	2015	
4,000	1962 Ranrahirca landslide	Peru	1962	
265	Winter of Terror; series of 649 avalanches	Austria-Switzerland-Italy	1951	
201 (56 confirmed, 155 presumed dead)	2012 Afghanistan avalanches	Afghanistan	2012	
200	Lahaul Valley avalanche	India	1979	
172	2010 Salang avalanches; series of at least 36 avalanches	Afghanistan	2010	
158	1918 Asahi village avalanche	Japan	January 9, 1918	
155	1918 Mitsumata village avalanche	Japan	1918	
138	2012 Gayari Sector avalanche	Pakistan	2012	
125	Kolka-Karmadon rock ice slide	Russia	2002	
110	1922 Hokuetsu Train avalanche	Japan	1922	
107	Saint-Martin (Hautes-Pyrénées)	France	1600	
102	2010 Kohistan avalanche	Pakistan	2010	
97	1992 Görmeç avalanche	Turkey	1992	
96	Wellington, Washington avalanche	United States	1910	
84	1938 Unazuki avalanche	Japan	1938	
81	Pragelato	Italy	1904	
79 (57 confirmed 22 presumed dead)	1954 Blons avalanches	Austria	1954	
70	Frassino avalanche	Italy	1885	
65	Palm Sunday Avalanche	United States	1898	
62	1910 Rogers Pass avalanche	Canada	1910	
59	1993 Bayburt Üzengili avalanche	Turkey	1993	
55	Møre og Romsdal	Norway	1679	
50	Siglunesi	Iceland	1613	
43	La Giettaz (Savoie)	France	1641	
43	Lenin Peak disaster	Kyrgyzstan	1990	
43	2014 Nepal snowstorm disaster	Nepal	October 2014	
42	1995 Gokyo avalanche	Nepal	1995	
41	2020 Van avalanches	Turkey	2020	
40	Puente del Inca avalanche	Argentina	1965	
39	1970 Val-d'Isère avalanche (Savoie)	France	1970	
38	Huez-en-Oisans (Isère)	France	1749	
37	Ortiporio (Corsica)	France	1934	
32	Vallouise (Hautes-Alpes)	France	1757	
31	1999 Galtür avalanche	Austria	1999	
29	Rigopiano avalanche	Italy	2017	
28	Granduc Mine Avalanche	Canada	1965	
28	2023 Nyingchi avalanche	China	2023	
27	2022 Uttarakhand avalanche	India	2022	
24	Seyðisfjörður	Iceland	1885	
24	2017 Gurez sector avalanche	India	2017	
23	Bâlea Lake	Romania	April 1977	
22	2015 Mount Everest avalanches; triggered by the April 2015 Nepal earthquake	Nepal	April 2015	
21	Sogn og Fjordane	Norway	1873	
21	Lofoten	Norway	1956	
20	Hnífsdalur	Iceland	1910	
20	1995 Flateyri avalanche	Iceland	1995	
18	Rybô	Slovakia	1924	
17	Àrreu	Spain	1804	
16	1937 Nanga Parbat tragedy	Nepal	1937	
16	Low Tatras	Slovakia	1956	
16	Vassdalen	Norway	1986	
16	2014 Mount Everest avalanche	Nepal	April 2014	
15	1972 Manaslu Nepal avalanche	Nepal	1972	
15	2023 Kharough avalanche	Tajikistan	February 2023	
14	1995 Súðavík avalanche	Iceland	1995	
12	1974 Neskaupstaður avalanches	Iceland	1974	
12	High Tatras	Slovakia	1974	
12	1999 Montroc avalanche	France	1999	
12	Kaprun avalanche	Austria	2000	
11	2009 Zigana avalanche	Turkey	2009	
11	Manaslu	Nepal	2012	
11	Ingraham Glacier	United States	1981	
11	1965 Malyovitsa avalanche	Bulgaria	1965	
11	2022 Marmolada serac collapse	Italy	2022	
11	2023 Astore avalanche	Pakistan	2023	
10	2009 Afghan avalanches	Afghanistan	2009	
10	2026 Broad Peak avalanche	Pakistan	2026	
9	Seyðisfjörður	Iceland	1732	
9	Siglufjörður	Iceland	1919	
9	Cerro ventana avalanche	Argentina	2002	
9	2003 Tatra Mountains avalanche	Poland	January 2003	
9	Mont Maudit avalanche (Haute-Savoie)	France	2012	
9	Restelica	Kosovo	2012	
9	Aru Range, Rutog County; two of the largest avalanches in history	China (Tibet)	2016	
9	2026 Lake Tahoe avalanche	United States	2026	
8	Flathead Valley avalanches	Canada	2008	
8	Lewes avalanche	United Kingdom	1836	
7	Alpine Meadows (northern California)	United States	March 1982	
7	Sankt Anton am Arlberg (Wolfsgruben avalanche)	Austria	1988	
7	2003 Connaught Creek Valley avalanche	Canada	2003	
7	Western Tatras	Slovakia	2005	
6	Oravská Magura	Slovakia	1968	
6	1970 Mount Everest disaster	Nepal	1970	
6	2009 Schalfkogel avalanche	Austria	2009	
6	Valfréjus avalanche	France	January 2016	
5	Loveland Pass avalanche (Colorado)	United States	2013	
5	2016 Geier avalanche	Austria	February 2016	
4	2021 Millcreek Canyon avalanche (Utah)	United States	February 6, 2021	
4	1992 Moab Talking Mountain Cirque Avalanche (Utah)	United States	February 12, 1992	
3	1996 Mount Everest disaster	Nepal	1996	
3	2009 Buachaille Etive Mòr avalanche	United Kingdom	2009	
3	2012 Tunnel Creek avalanche (Washington)	United States	2012	
3	2019 Howse Peak avalanche	Canada	2019	
3	2020 Silver Mountain avalanche (northern Idaho)	United States	January 7, 2020	
3	2025 Chugach Mountains avalanche	United States	2025	

== See also ==
- Avalanche
- List of natural disasters by death toll
- List of deaths on eight-thousanders
- List of mountaineering disasters by death toll
