= 2010 Salang avalanches =

Disaster in Parwan, Afghanistan

Coordinates: 35.3219°N 69.0267°E

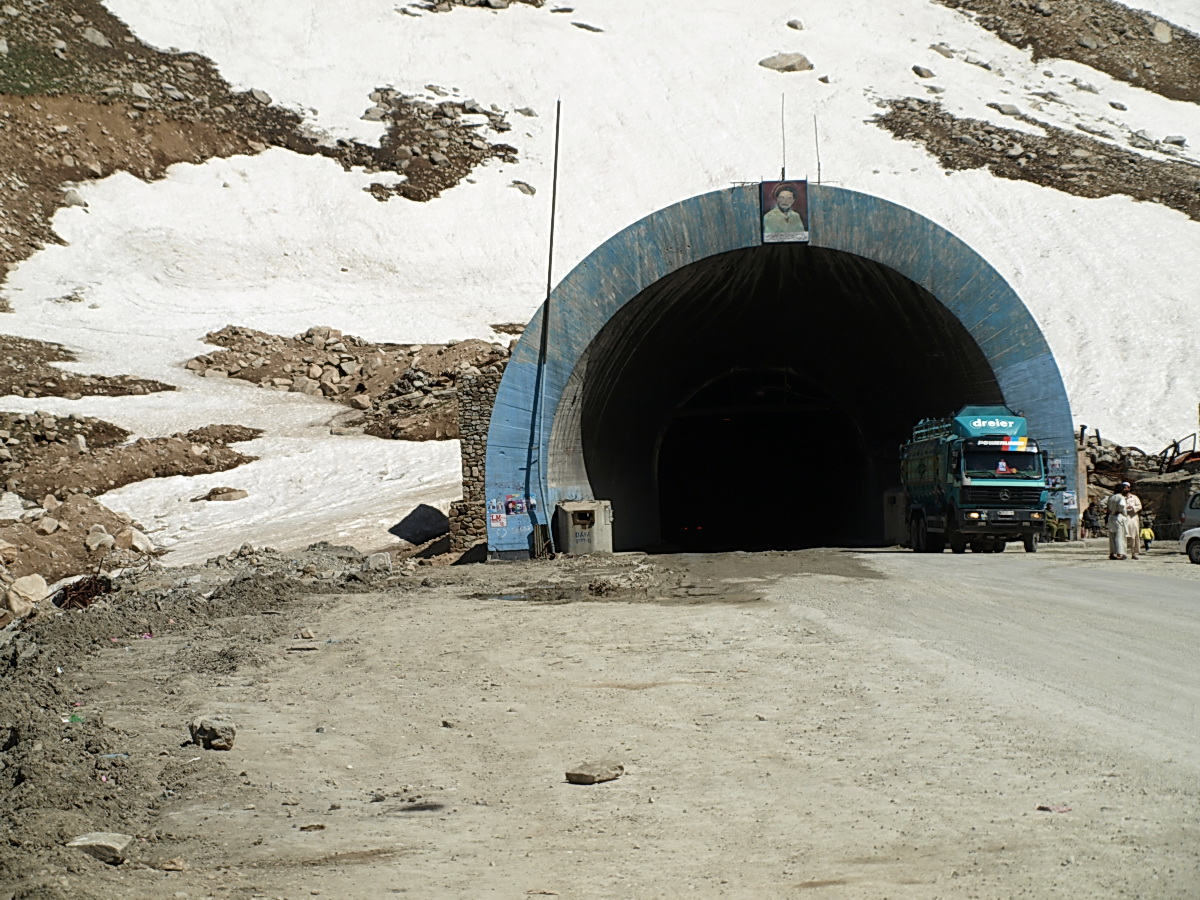
- Entrance of the Salang Tunnel
- Date: 8 February 2010
- Location: Southern Salang Pass, Parwan Province, Afghanistan
- Deaths: 175

The 2010 Salang avalanches (Dari: برف‌کوچ‌های سالنگ, Pashto: سالنګ کې د واورې ښوئېدنې) consisted of a series of at least 36 avalanches that struck the southern approach to the Salang Tunnel, north of Kabul. They were caused by an unusually intense snowstorm traveling through the Hindu Kush mountains.

== Leading up to the disaster ==
About 250 avalanches annually strike the road. During the 2008-09 season, 40 people were killed by avalanches in Afghanistan.

On 7 February 2010, the Afghan Red Crescent Society (ARCS) reported that 10 people were killed in Kandahar Province. Najibullah Barith, ARCS's director in Kandahar complained about the lack of local and national resources.

A spokesman for the Afghanistan National Disasters Management Authority said that 11 people were killed by avalanches in Farah, Bamyan, Ghor and Daikundi provinces between 4 and 8 February. Flash floods and avalanches left 20 others dead in the rest of the country on 8 February. The provincial authorities had summoned an emergency meeting and Loya Jurga to discuss responses on 8 February. Shah Wali Kot and Shorandam districts were the worst affected.

== Avalanches ==
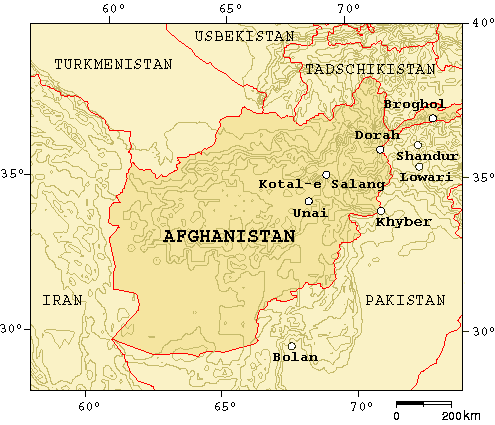
Mountain passes of Afghanistan

A sudden blizzard struck the area shortly before the disaster, closing the tunnel and the roads around it on both sides of the tunnel. Heavy wind and rain in the area just before the incident caused up to 17 avalanches that buried at least 3.5 km (2.2 mi) of roadway in the Salang Tunnel, trapping thousands of people in their vehicles who were travelling in the tunnel. This also cut off one of the major travel links to northern Afghanistan.

Official reports soon after the avalanche report up to 64 people were feared dead and that more could die. Afghanistan's interior minister Mohammad Hanif Atmar believed that there could be at least 2,500 people trapped in their vehicles. Many vehicles were pushed down the mountains, and hundreds of cars were buried in snow. Among the survivors many injuries were reported.

The tunnel was reopened on 12 February 2010.

== Rescue ==
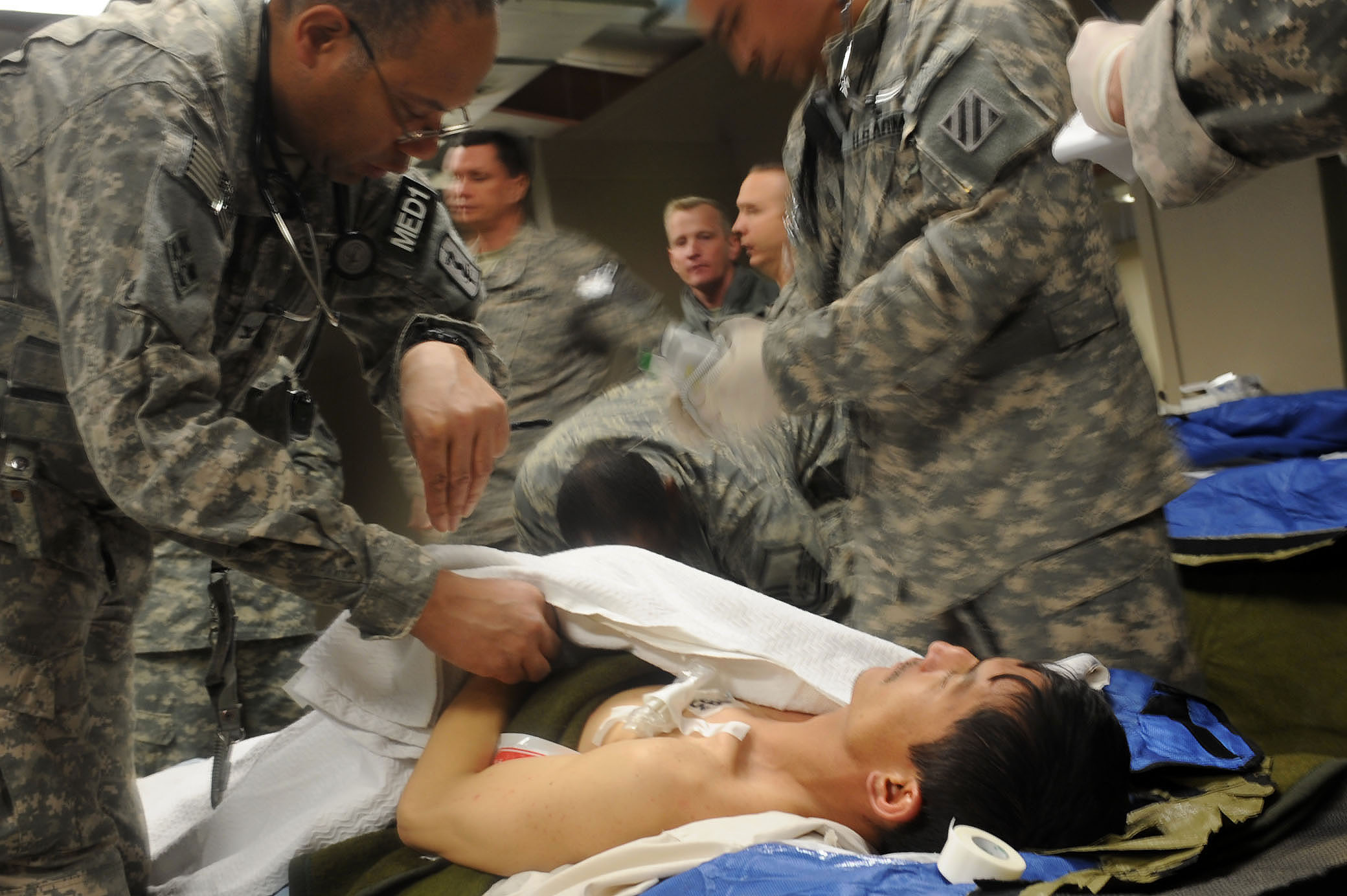
US Army medical personnel tending to a wounded survivor at Bagram Airfield

The Afghan National Army formed the main backbone of the recovery effort with at least 500 troops sent to the area as well as two helicopters and several bulldozers. NATO International Security Assistance Force forces also gave their support providing four Chinook helicopters, as well as using helicopters to drop food and medical supplies to those trapped in their vehicles. The injured had been taken to Charikar Hospital in Parwan Province, and the more seriously injured to Bagram Airfield where they received more advanced medical treatment from coalition doctors.

Beside the direct injuries from the avalanche, there was also the danger of carbon monoxide poisoning inside the poorly-ventilated tunnel, while the traffic was stalled for a long time. By 10 February, about 2,500 people had been rescued, but it was feared that more people were still buried in their snow-trapped vehicles.

== Criticism ==
Institutional authorities including the National Meteorology Authority (NMA) were criticised for allowing the disaster to unfold. Although heavy snowfall had been forecast in the Salang area and structural walls had been weakened in previous avalanches, the pass was not closed and no preparations had been put in place. Officials point out that Afghanistan lacks the resources and infrastructure for the prevention and management of natural disasters and relies to some degree upon help by the United Nations and international forces.

== See also ==
- Salang Pass
- Salang Tunnel fire
- 2009 Afghan avalanches
- 2010 Pakistan floods
- 2010 Northern Hemisphere heat waves
- 2010 Khyber Pakhtunkhwa floods
- Attabad Lake
- Cyclone Phet
