= 2020 Van avalanches =

Two successive avalanches in Van Province, 2020

- Location within Turkey
- Date: 4–5 February 2020
- Location: Bahçesaray, Van, Turkey; 38°7′43″N 42°48′27″E
- Cause: Heavy snowfall
- Deaths: 4 Feb: 5; 5 Feb: 36; Total: 41
- Injuries: 84

In February 2020, two avalanches occurred near Bahçesaray in Turkey's eastern Van Province. The first, on 4 February, buried two vehicles, leading to a rescue operation involving around 350 people. The second, on 5 February, occurred while this operation was ongoing. At least 41 people were killed in the two avalanches, with 84 others being injured, six seriously.

== Avalanches ==
On the evening of 4 February 2020, an avalanche took place in a mountain pass in the Bahçesaray district, leaving a snow-clearing vehicle and a minibus buried. Five people were killed and two others were reported missing, while seven passengers and the vehicle's operator managed to escape. In response, a major rescue operation was launched, involving 350 personnel from Turkey's Disaster and Emergency Management Presidency (AFAD) and National Medical Rescue Team (UMKE), in addition to 75 Gendarmerie Search and Rescue Battalion Command staff. While the team was on-site, a second avalanche struck around noon on 5 February, overturning vehicles and leaving at least 33 people dead.

== Aftermath ==
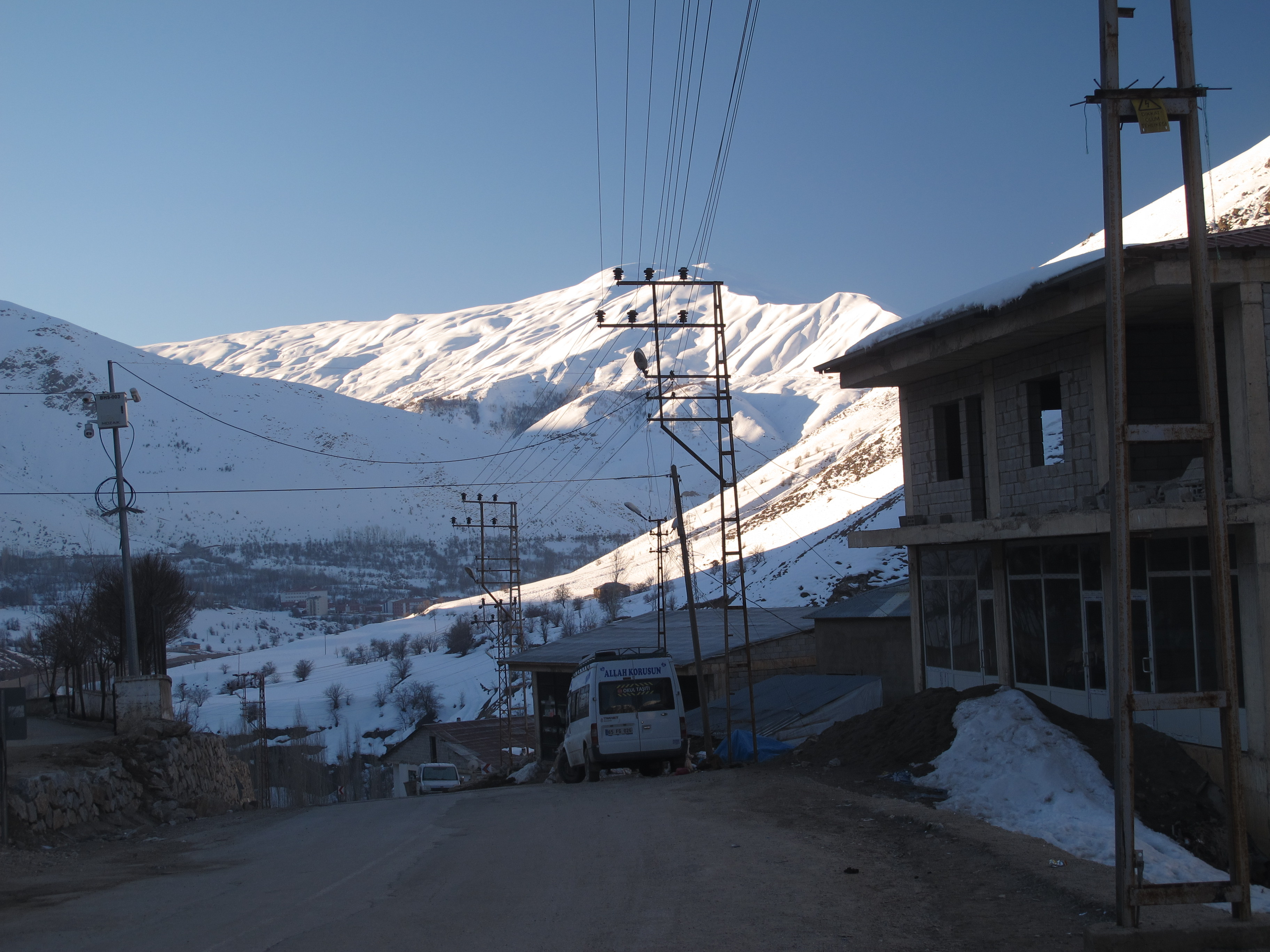
Typical winter landscape in the İhtiyar Şahap mountains (view from Bahçesaray)

The governor of Van Province, Mehmet Emin Bilmez, said that the initial death toll of 38 included one non-commissioned officer, 10 specialized sergeants, 11 gendarmerie soldiers, three village guards, three firefighters and 9 volunteers. Officials later announced that 53 people were injured in total, and an unknown number remained buried under the snow. Heavy snow, fog and strong winds were slowing down the rescue efforts, with more than 114 locations being cut off due to impassable roads.

On 6 February, AFAD officials announced that the death toll had increased to 41, and a total of 180 personnel were searching for the bodies of at least three people still missing, while setting off controlled explosions to lessen the risk of further avalanches. In anticipation of interruptions to communication, two mobile base stations were provided. The number of injured had risen to 84, 47 of whom remained hospitalized, including six in intensive care.

A memorial ceremony was held in Van on 6 February for 23 Gendarmerie General Command staff, nine village guards and two firefighters who were killed in the disaster. The coffins of the deceased were then sent to their various hometowns for burial. On 7 February the Turkish Interior Ministry assigned a team of three inspectors to "inquire and investigate every aspect of the two avalanche incidents".

Warnings were issued by the Turkish State Meteorological Service following heavy snowfall on 9 February, which halted travel in the eastern Black Sea region. The Daily Sabah reported that overnight on 9–10 February temperatures in Göle dropped to around −40 °C (−40 °F), a record low for the year; Göle was also the coldest place in Turkey in 2019 at −32.5 °C (−26.5 °F).

== See also ==
- 2020s in environmental history
- 1992 Görmeç avalanche, Turkey's deadliest modern avalanche disaster
- 1993 Bayburt Üzengili avalanche, which forced the relocation of an entire village
- 2009 Zigana avalanche, last deadly avalanche in Turkey
- List of avalanches by death toll
