= 1999 Montroc avalanche =

Avalanche in France

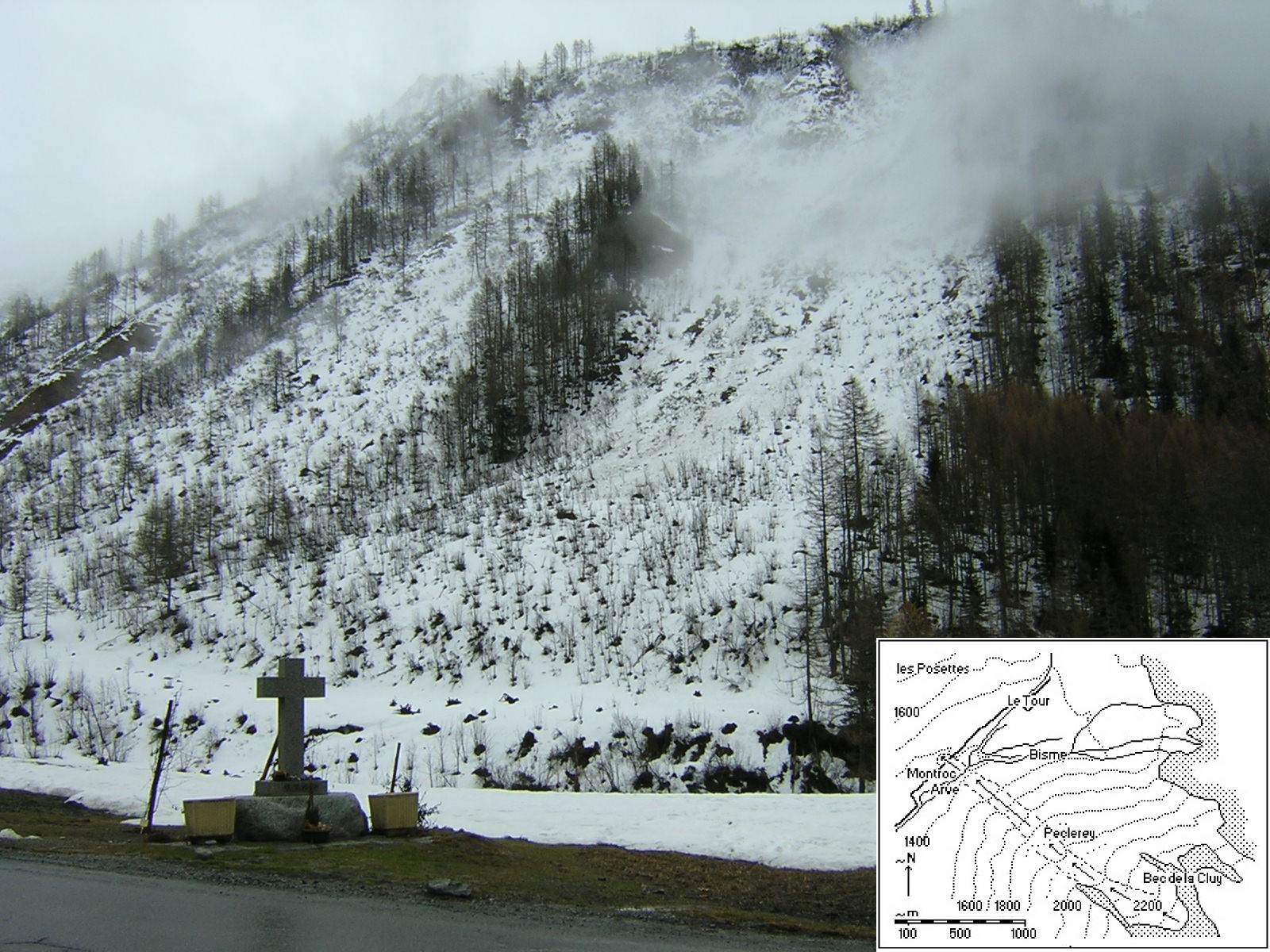
- A memorial commemorating the lives lost in the avalanche near the Le Peclerey slope in Chamonix
- Date: February 9, 1999
- Time: 14:20 (UTC+1)
- Location: Montroc, Chamonix, France
- Cause: Avalanche
- Deaths: 12

The Montroc avalanche occurred on February 9, 1999, at 14:20 local time. Twelve people lost their lives, and multiple structures were either damaged or completely destroyed due to the immense force of the avalanche. It was considered one of the most destructive avalanches in the French Alps since the 1970 Val-d'Isère avalanche.

== Geography ==
The Peclerey slope, where the avalanche occurred, consisted of two convex slopes. The first began at 2,450 meters and ended at 1,947 meters, halfway down the slope. The second potential avalanche zone started at around 1,700 meters and extended to the base of the slope. The slope's lower end curved slightly upward from the bed of the Arve River towards the road and local communities. Notably, the slope's angle from the top to the road was measured at 25 degrees, which should have resulted in a smoother and less intense avalanche, reducing its impact.

=== Weather conditions before and during the avalanche ===
At the start of the year, winter conditions were dry, though sufficient for ski resorts in Le Tour and Chamonix to open early. On January 26, a long-awaited snowfall covered the area with one meter of snow. However, the weather remained dry again afterward. On February 7, a depression moved across France, depositing two meters of snow over Chamonix and nearby communes within three days. A storm of this magnitude had not been seen since 1978.

== Avalanche ==
Heavy snowfall accumulated in the valley above the towns, forming a dangerous bowl of unstable snow. The snow depth reached 2,450 meters at the peak of the slope. Several ski resorts across the French-Swiss border were forced to close due to the heightened avalanche risk. Rumors spread that multiple small avalanches had already damaged a ski lift in Le Tour.

At around 14:40, while local authorities were discussing evacuation plans, a 1.5-meter-deep section of snow, covering an area of 30 hectares, detached from the valley. It cascaded down the slope toward the hamlet of Montroc, reaching a top speed of 60 mph (almost 100 km/h). As it accelerated, the avalanche grew to a size of 300,000 cubic meters of snow. Upon reaching Montroc, more than 100,000 tonnes of snow buried parts of Chamonix under a maximum depth of five meters.

== Damage and casualties ==
The avalanche caused extensive damage, particularly in Montroc. Records show that 14 buildings were completely destroyed, while six others sustained minor to severe damage. Additionally, 20 cabins, mostly near the Chamonix ski resort, were destroyed. Many newly built homes near the avalanche path were severely affected.

In addition to structural damage, multiple people were buried beneath the snow. Rescue efforts were launched to find survivors and recover victims. Ultimately, 12 people were confirmed dead.

== Impacts ==
The devastation caused by the avalanche could have been mitigated with better planning by local authorities. The mayor of Chamonix at the time was sentenced to three months in prison for involuntary homicide, as he had failed to evacuate the chalets in time.

Following the disaster, avalanche hazard mapping and disaster prevention measures were taken more seriously.

A small memorial was erected in front of the Peclerey slope to honour the victims. The memorial consists of a cross surrounded by slabs of stone.

== See also ==
- List of avalanches by death toll
- Montroc
- 1970 Val-d'Isère avalanche
