= Kushan Pass =

Mountain pass in northern Afghanistan

- Elevation: c. 4,370 m (14,340 ft)
- Location: Afghanistan
- Range: Hindu Kush

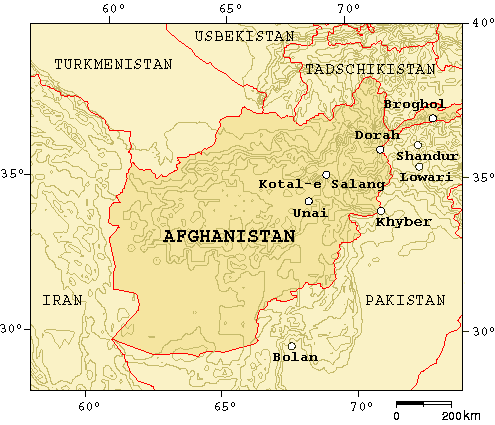
Mountain passes of Afghanistan

The Kushan Pass or Kaoshan Pass (el. about 4,370 m or 14,340 ft) is a mountain pass 7.4 km southwest of the Salang Pass (3,878 m. or 12,723 ft.) in the Hindu Kush mountain range of northern Afghanistan. These two passes provided the most direct, if difficult, routes across the imposing east–west wall of the Hindu Kush mountains which divide northern Afghanistan or Tokharistan from Kabul province, which is closely connected to southern Afghanistan and Pakistan. The Salang tunnel constructed by the Soviets in the 1960s, and the paved road through it, make it by far the easiest route through the Hindu Kush Mountains.

Vincent Smith states that Alexander the Great took his troops across both the Khawak Pass and the Kaoshān or Kushan Pass.

"Towards the close of spring in the year 327 B.C. when the sun had sufficiently melted the snows, he [Alexander] led his army, including perhaps fifty or sixty thousand Europeans, across the lofty Khāwak and Kaoshān passes of the Hindu Kush, or Indian Caucasus, and after ten days' toil amidst the mountains emerged in the rich valley now known as the Koh-i-Daman."

However, according to some scholars, there is really no proof for this.

It seems probable that the pass was named after the Kushan dynasty which had a number of important sites in the region of Baghlan, to the north of the passes (dating from the 1st century BCE to the 2nd century CE), including the majestic fortified dynastic temple of Surkh Kotal and Rabatak where the fascinating Rabatak inscription listing the names of the early Kushan kings, and providing evidence on the date of the beginning of the Kanishka era was found a few years ago—which is now commonly thought to have begun around 127 CE.

It seems it is the Yangi-Yuli, or "New Road" of Babur (1483–1530), the conqueror of northern India and founder of the Mughal Dynasty.

Both the Kushan and Khawak passes, so important for the early history of Afghanistan, are now bypassed by the paved road that runs through the Salang tunnel under the Salang Pass, completed by the Soviets in 1964, at a height of about 3,400 m. It links Charikar and Kabul with Kunduz, Khulm, Mazari Sharif and Termez.
