= 2022 Salang Tunnel fire =

Disaster in Afghanistan

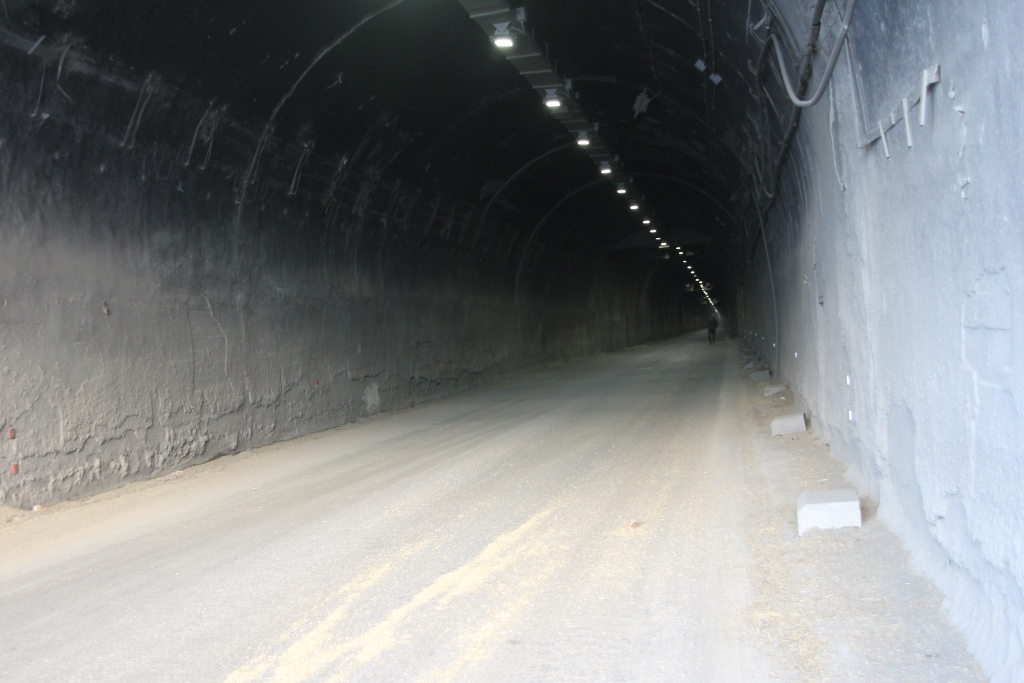
- Interior shot of the tunnel taken in November 2013

- Explosion (Afghanistan)
- Date: 18 December 2022
- Time: 20:30 AFT (UTC+04:30)
- Location: Salang Tunnel, Afghanistan; 35.3100°N 69.0425°E
- Type: Fuel tanker explosion
- Deaths: 31
- Injuries: 37

On 18 December 2022, a tanker truck exploded in the Salang Tunnel in Afghanistan, killing at least 31 people.

== Background ==
The Salang Tunnel was built by the Soviet Union in 1964 and its 2.67 km (1.66 mi) length connects the Parwan and Baghlan provinces. It is known to be one of the most dangerous tunnels in the world. Due to the lack of ventilation and illumination, dust and fumes reduce visibility to only a few meters. A fire in 1982 killed at least 168 Soviet soldiers and Afghans (according to the Soviet estimate), and carbon monoxide buildup killed 16 Soviet servicemen in another incident on February 23, 1980.

== Disaster ==
On 18 December 2022, a fuel tanker exploded and caught fire in the Salang Tunnel. The explosion occurred at around 8:30 pm and the cause of the blast is not yet known. The resulting fire made it difficult to evacuate victims with flames spreading from the tanker to other vehicles in the tunnel. According to Said Himatullah Shamim, a spokesman for the Parwan Province, survivors of the blast were still buried under the debris, and the number of casualties was expected to climb.

Molvi Hamidullah Misbah, a spokesman for the Taliban ministry of public works, stated earlier on Sunday that the fire had been put out and rescue workers were attempting to clear the tunnel.

== Victims ==
At least 31 people were killed and over 30 others injured by the explosion, with numbers expected to rise. According to Dr. Abdullah Afghan, a local representative of the Parwan health department, the victims included two children and ten females. Some of the casualties were so badly burned that it was impossible to identify them.

== Response ==
A deputy spokesperson for the Taliban government, Qari Yusuf Ahamdi, said "The Islamic Emirate expresses its deepest condolences to the families and the victims".
