= Salang Tunnel fire =

Salang Tunnel fire may refer to:

- 1982 Salang Tunnel fire
- 2022 Salang Tunnel fire
