= Khawak Pass =

Mountain pass in Afghanistan

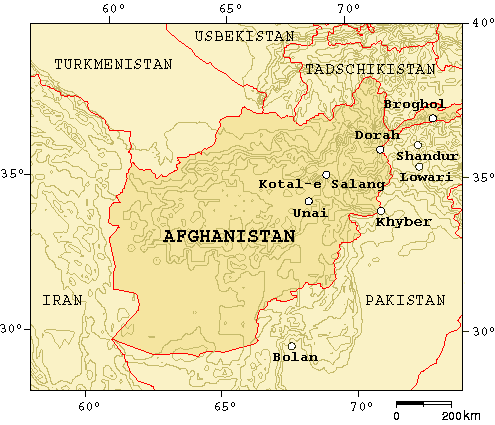
- Mountain passes of Afghanistan

- Location within Afghanistan
- Elevation: 3,848 m (12,625 ft)

Location
- Location: Afghanistan
- Range: Hindu Kush
- Coordinates: 35°39′47.1″N 69°47′14.1″E

Khawak Pass (elevation 3,848 m (12,625 ft)) sits across the route heading to the northwest from near the head of the Panjshir Valley through the Hindu Kush range to northern Afghanistan via Andarab, Andarab, Khavak, and Baghlan.

This is the route traditionally thought to have been followed by Alexander the Great in the spring of 329 BCE when he led his army from the Kabul Valley across the mountains to Bactria (later Tokharistan in the north). Vincent Smith states that Alexander took his troops across both the Khāwak and the Kaoshān or Kushan Pass. According to some scholars, there is no proof of this.

The Khāwak is most probably the pass used by the famous Chinese Buddhist pilgrim monk, Xuanzang, on his return from India to China in the early 7th century. In 1333, the Moroccan explorer and traveler Ibn Battuta crossed the pass on his journey to India. When dictating his account over twenty years later he remembered spreading felt cloth in front of his camels to prevent them sinking into the snow.

The Khāwak was also crossed by Timur (1336–1405), and by Captain John Wood on his return journey to the sources of the Oxus in the mid-19th century. It was the easternmost pass leading from the Kabul Valley into northern Afghanistan, and the most popular pass of this region.

This pass, so important for the early history of Afghanistan, is now for the most part bypassed by the paved road that runs through the Salang tunnel under the Salang Pass, completed by the Soviets in 1964, at an elevation of about 3,400 m (11,200 ft). It links Charikar and Kabul with Kunduz, Khulm, Mazari Sharif and Termez.

== Climate ==
Khawak pass is a high mountain pass at an altitude of 3,848 metres (12,625 ft) above sea level and the climate is extremely harsh.

According to the Köppen climate classification, the pass has a tundra climate (ET) with cold to bitterly cold weather year-round.

Climate data for Khawak Pass (1988-2017)
Month	Jan	Feb	Mar	Apr	May	Jun	Jul	Aug	Sep	Oct	Nov	Dec	Year
Daily mean °C (°F)	−23.7 (−10.7)	−21.2 (−6.2)	−14.8 (5.4)	−7.8 (18.0)	−3.0 (26.6)	1.4 (34.5)	3.7 (38.7)	2.8 (37.0)	−1.5 (29.3)	−7.6 (18.3)	−14.8 (5.4)	−21.2 (−6.2)	−9.0 (15.8)
Average precipitation mm (inches)	68.4 (2.69)	99.8 (3.93)	98.6 (3.88)	93.8 (3.69)	64.7 (2.55)	24.8 (0.98)	20.7 (0.81)	19.4 (0.76)	12.9 (0.51)	30.8 (1.21)	40.6 (1.60)	48.3 (1.90)	622.8 (24.51)
Source: ClimateCharts.net
