= Zygana =

Zygana once was a bishopric in Lazica, Georgia and remains a Latin Catholic titular see.

== Ecclesiastical history ==
Its location was modern Cobuleti. It was presumably a suffragan of the Archdiocese of Phasis (Fasi, modern Poti). No residential incumbents available, nor a date of suppression.

In 1933 it was nominally restored as Latin Catholic Titular bishopric of Zygana (Latin) / Zigana (Curiate Italian) / Zyganen(sis) (Latin adjective).

It is of the Episcopal (lowest) rank, but has had no incumbent yet.

== See also ==
- Zigana, (notably Turkish) namesakes

== Sources and external links ==
- GCatholic
