= Zigana Tunnel (2023) =

Road tunnel in Turkey

Zigana Tunnel Zigana Tüneli
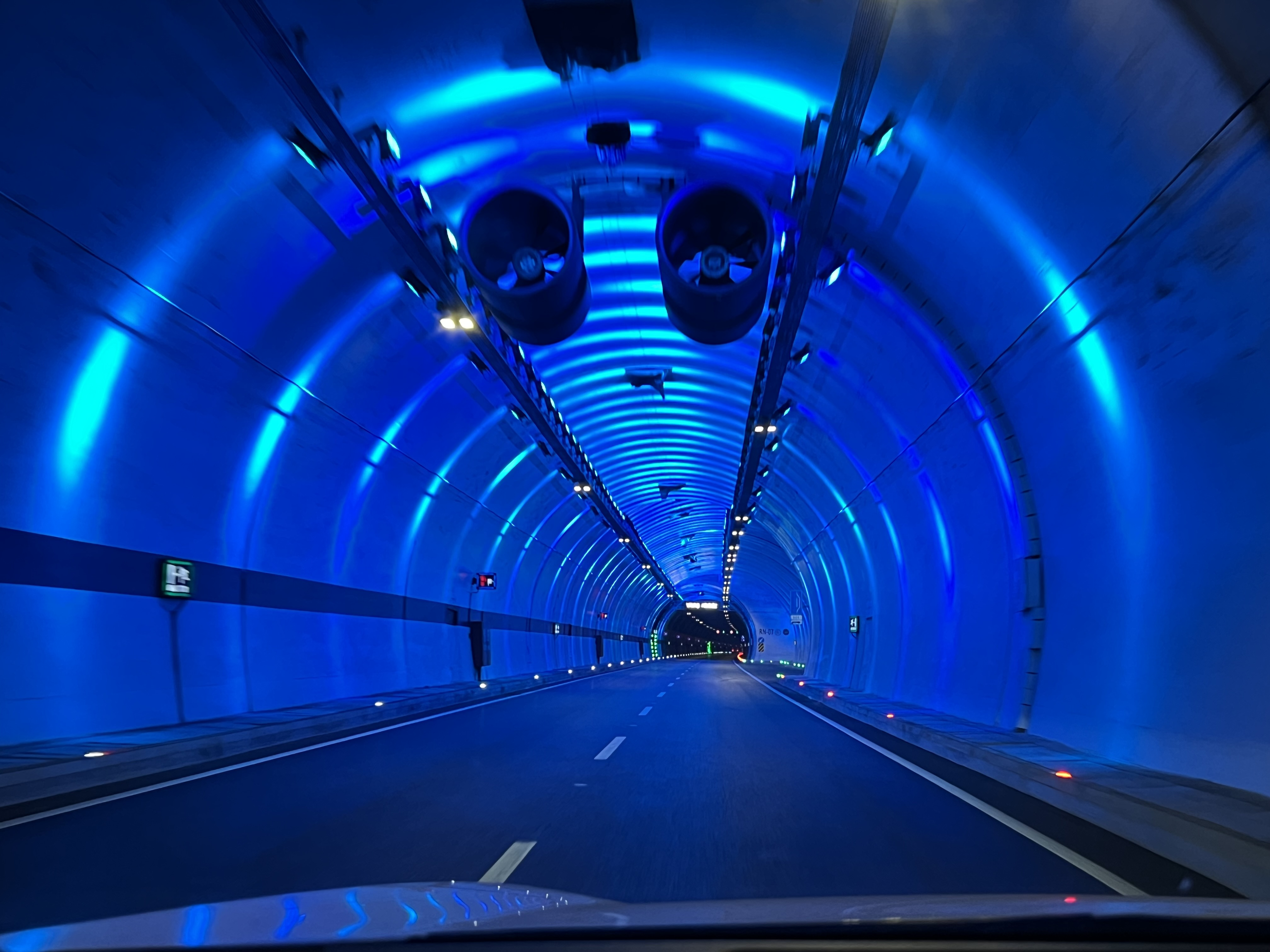
- Interactive map of Zigana Tunnel; Zigana Tüneli

Overview
- Location: Zigana Pass, Torul, Gümüşhane-Maçka, Trabzon, Turkey
- Coordinates: 40°40′25.4″N 39°23′22.2″E
- Status: In service
- Route: D.885; E97

Operation
- Work began: April 14, 2016
- Opens: May 4, 2023
- Owner: General Directorate of Highways
- Traffic: automotive
- Character: Twin-tube tunnel

Technical
- Length: 14,481 m (47,510 ft)

Location of Zigana Tunnel in Turkey

Zigana Tunnel (Turkish: Zigana Tüneli) is a twin tube road tunnel in the Black Sea Region of Turkey. Located on the provincial border of Gümüşhane and Trabzon, the tunnel carries routes D.885 (E97) between Torul, Gümüşhane in the south and Maçka, Trabzon in the north. It is the country's longest tunnel with a length of 14,481 m (47,510 ft).

Situated near Mount Zigana in the Pontic Mountains, the tunnel was built to bypass the 2,032 m (6,667 ft) Zigana Pass and the older 1980s-built Zigana Tunnel. It shortened the route by about 8 km (5.0 mi) and reduced the travel time by twenty minutes. The new Zigana Tunnel opened for traffic in 2023.
