= 2023 Nyingchi avalanche =

Avalanche in Nyingchi, China

- Date: 17 January 2023
- Time: 7:50 PM China Standard Time
- Location: Nyingchi
- Cause: High winds, rising temperature
- Deaths: 28
- Injuries: 53

An avalanche struck a road in Nyingchi at around 7:50 PM China Standard Time on 17 January 2023. Twenty-eight people were killed and 53 others were rescued, five of whom were seriously injured.

Local reports attributed the avalanche to high winds and warming temperatures, and identified most of the victims as travelers during the spring travel rush prior to the Chinese New Year. The affected road was between Pei, Tibet, and the exit of the Doxong La tunnel, in Medog County. Victims were trapped inside the tunnel and in their vehicles under snow and ice.

At least 1,348 rescuers and 236 pieces of equipment were deployed, digging a 7.5 kilometres (4.7 mi) path through waist-deep snow in rough terrain. Rescue operations concluded at 5:30 PM on 20 January 2023.

== See also ==
- Weather of 2023
- List of avalanches by death toll
