= 1982 Salang Tunnel fire =

Road accident and fire in Afghanistan

Coordinates: 35°19′19.91″N 69°1′36.72″E

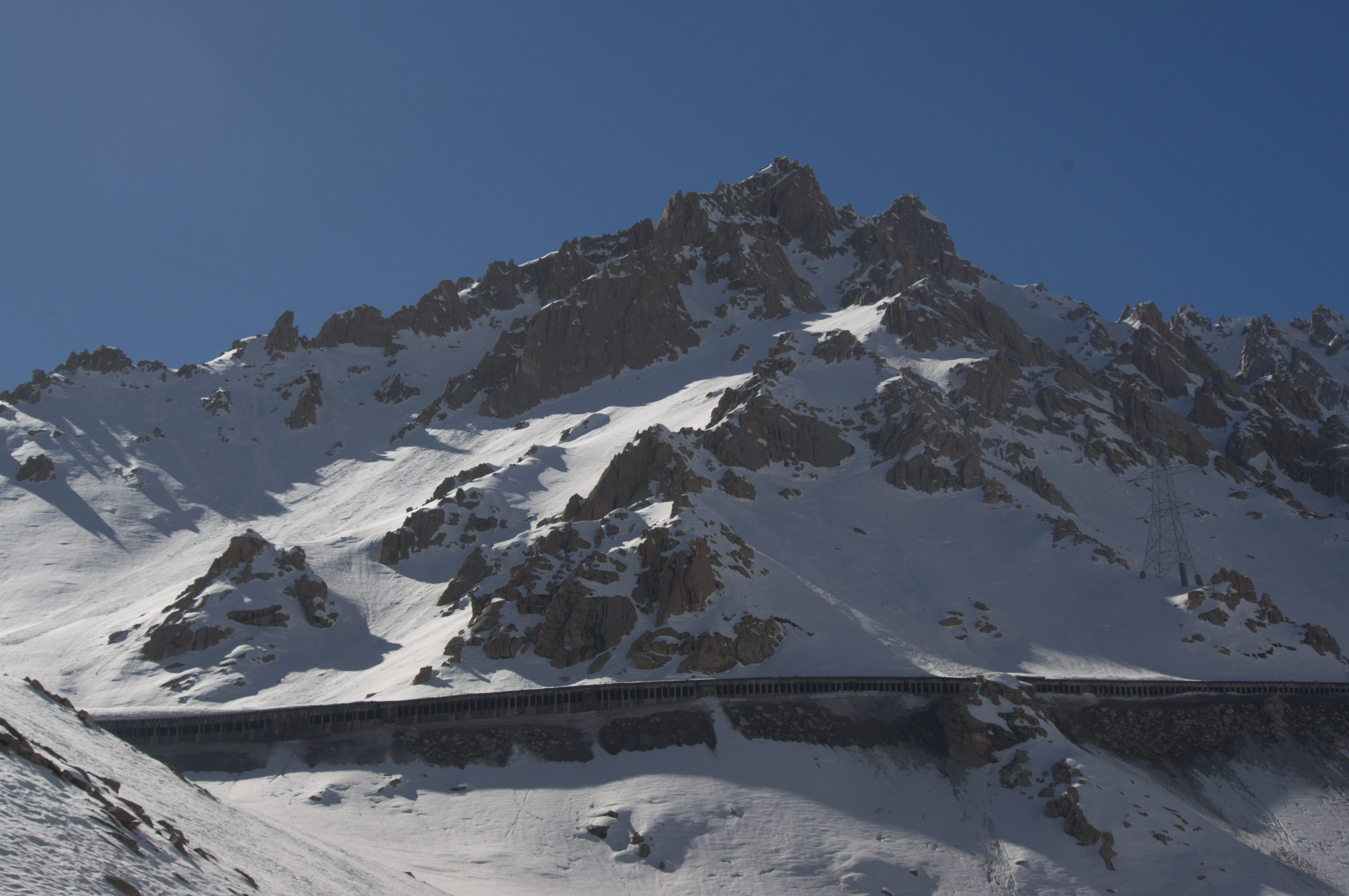
- A distance view of the Salang Tunnel in March 2010
- Location: Hindu Kush, Afghanistan
- Date: 3 November 1982
- Deaths: 168–172 (Soviet estimate); 2,700–3,000 (Western estimate)

The 1982 Salang Tunnel fire occurred on 3 November 1982 in Afghanistan's Salang Tunnel during the Soviet–Afghan War. Details are uncertain and officially the number of casualties was recorded as between 168–176 Soviet and Afghan soldiers and civilians. Despite this, contemporary Western media said the incident may have been the deadliest known road accident, and one of the deadliest fires of modern times, with the death toll estimated at 2,700 people, including 700 Soviet soldiers.

== Background ==
The Salang Tunnel was completed by Soviet engineers in 1964 and is of major strategic importance, allowing motor traffic to bypass the infamous Salang Pass (or Kotal-e Salang).

Prior to the 1982 fire, on 23 February 1980, carbon monoxide buildup killed 16 Soviet soldiers in the Salang Tunnel.

== Fire ==
Very few facts are known about the fire. All information available constitutes little more than hearsay, in part because the Soviet Army was not inclined to reveal massive losses during wartime. Neither the Soviet nor Afghan governments confirmed any incident occurred. Most sources agree that it involved a Soviet Army convoy traveling southward through the tunnel.

According to Soviet Army records, on 3 November 1982, two military convoys (2211 and 2212) collided in the Salang tunnel causing a traffic jam, but no fire or explosion.

== Victims ==
Initial reports described fuel and ordnance explosions, and estimates of the death toll were as high as 2,700. Shortly after the event, Western diplomats indicated that a collision with a fuel truck initiated the fire in the tunnel, resulting in the death of as many as 700 Soviet soldiers and 400 to 2,000 Afghan civilians. People died either from fire or smoke inhalation. The death toll was subsequently revised downwards by the Soviet government many times. Fifty-six to 64 Soviet soldiers and 112 Afghans were killed by carbon monoxide emitted by idling engines.

== Response ==
Afghan insurgents said they did not have any role in the explosion in the tunnel.

== See also ==
- List of road accidents
- List of transportation fires

== External links and sources ==
- Summary from Frankfurt International School
- Casualty data from 2001 (of unknown accuracy)
- Tunnel length and altitude
- BBC News, Inside the Salang tunnel, 2002
- BBC News, Report on the state of the Salang tunnel, 2002
