= Montroc =

Hamlet in Chamonix, France

Coordinates: 45°59′50″N 6°56′7″E

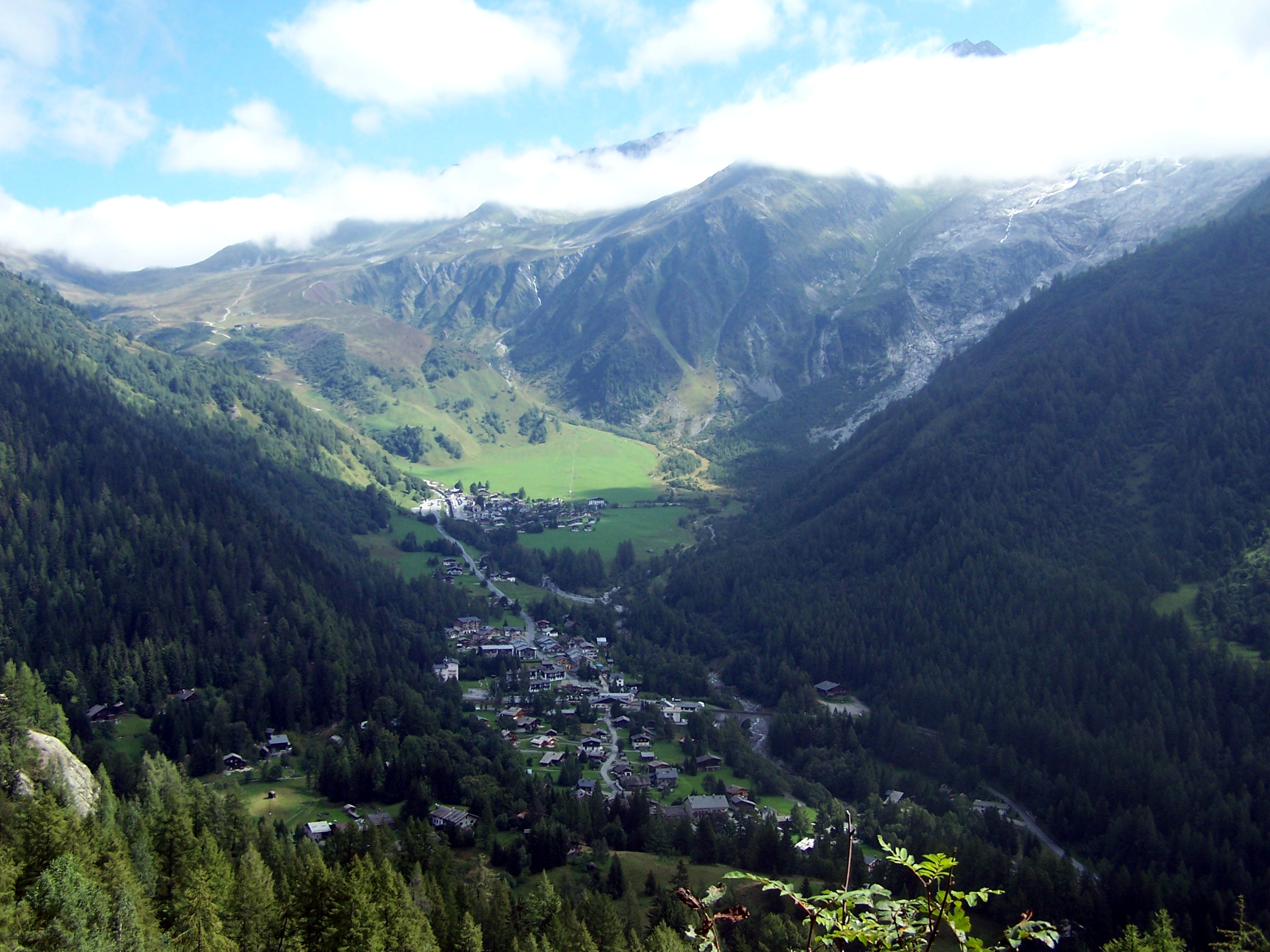
View of Montroc, Chamonix District

Montroc is a hamlet in eastern France, located in the territory of the commune of Chamonix.

Several houses at Poses 150 m north-east of Montroc were destroyed on 9 February 1999 by a slab avalanche from Bec du Lachat and Mont Peclerey on the Mont Blanc massif, killing 12 people. In July 2003, the mayor of Chamonix, Michel Charlet, received a three-month suspended prison sentence for his part in the handling of events immediately prior to the avalanche. There is a memorial to those lost at site of the avalanche on the road from Montroc to Le Tour.
