= 1970 Val-d'Isère avalanche =

Avalanche in France

At around 8am on 10 February 1970, after days of very heavy snowfall, a large avalanche struck the town of Val-d'Isère in the Savoie region of France. It hit a chalet run by the UCPA Union nationale des centres sportifs de plein air [an NGO promoting youth access to the outdoors] in the bottom of the valley, claiming several dozen victims, both dead and injured.

Details of incident

At about 8am on 10 February 1970, following days of very heavy snowfall, an avalanche broke away from the Pointe du Front situated to the north-north east of the centre of Val-d’Isère at an altitude of about 2,900m (2,960 m, 45° 27′ 43″ N, 6° 59′ 34″ E). The snow hurtled approximately 1,840m downwards to the valley bottom, crossing the river Isère and the Col de L’Iseran road, before crashing into the UCPA chalet and coming to a stop. The force of the avalanche was later described as extraordinary by the French Council of State.

Consequences

Thirty-nine young people died, buried under the snow. Most deaths occurred in the dining room where the large windows had shattered easily on impact from the avalanche. Thirty-seven others were injured. At that point in the year, 194 holiday-makers were staying at the chalet.

It was the greatest avalanche-related disaster on French soil since the 1934 Ortiporio avalanche in Corsica.

At a time of major tourist development in the ski areas, there was a real sense of national shock. The Plateau d’Assy disaster, which occurred two months later, further reinforced the need to address natural hazards in France.

Post-accident management

Following these events, the National Association for the Study of Snow and Avalanches (ANENA) was set up.

Following legal action in the Administrative Tribunal, pursued on appeal to the Council of State, the State and the local authority were each held liable for 50% of the damages caused by the disaster (decision dated 14/3/1986).

As early as the summer following the disaster (1970), the first French avalanche location map (CLPA) was created in Val-d’Isère in the Haute-Tarentaise region. Also in Val-d’Isère, the zoning of “natural mountain hazards,” developed specifically for avalanches, was introduced in 1975. Since then, a natural disaster prevention plan and a municipal rescue plan have been put in place; they are reviewed regularly.

The UCPA chalet was rebuilt with anti-avalanche protection (different layout, reinforced walls, small windows/door openings, solid shutters etc). A number of other protective measures were put in place, including more than 2km of metal anti-avalanche barriers in the starting zone and the construction of a reinforced concrete wall at the side of the Col de l’Iseran road near to the large dining room windows which had shattered on impact from the avalanche.
