= Zigana Tunnel (1988) =

Road tunnel in northeastern Turkey

Zigana Tunnel Zigana Tüneli
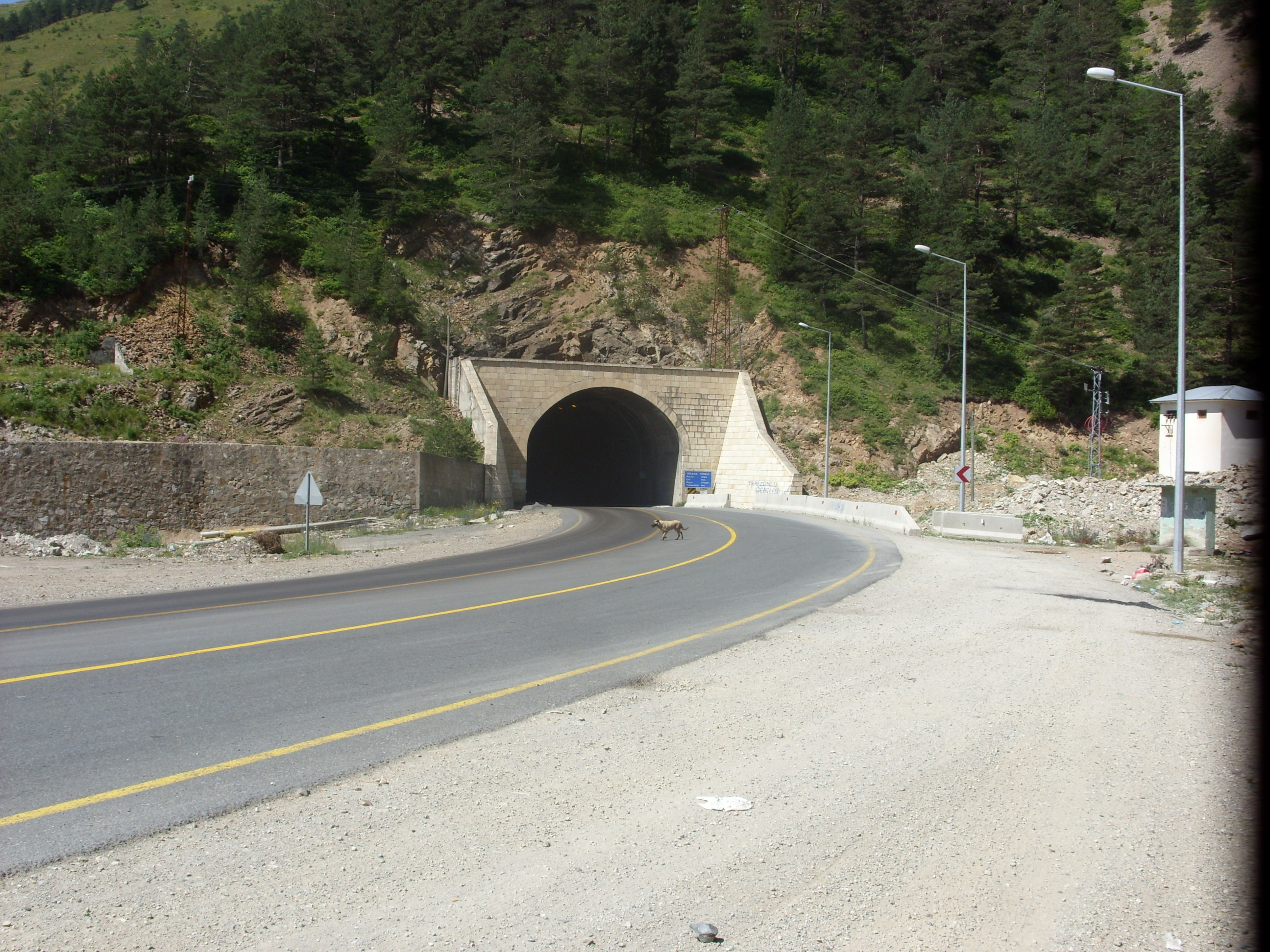
- Interactive map of Zigana Tunnel; Zigana Tüneli

Overview
- Location: Maçka–Torul, Gümüşhane Province, Turkey
- Coordinates: 40°38′58″N 39°23′36″E Location of Zigana Tunnel in Turkey
- Status: Operational
- Route: D.885; E97

Operation
- Work began: 1975
- Opened: 1988
- Operator: General Directorate of Highways
- Traffic: automotive

Technical
- Length: 1,702 m (5,584 ft)
- No. of lanes: 2 x 1
- Max elevation: 1,820 m (5,970 ft)
- Min elevation: 1,795 m (5,889 ft)
- Tunnel clearance: 8.50 m (27.9 ft)
- Width: 11.20 m (36.7 ft)

The Zigana Tunnel (Turkish: Zigana Tüneli) is a road tunnel constructed on the Maçka, Trabzon–Torul, Gümüşhane state highway D.885 (E97) southwest of the provincial border Trabzon–Gümüşhane, northeastern Turkey. It was opened to traffic in 1988.

Situated at Zigana Pass on the Pontic Mountains, the 1,702 m (5,584 ft)-long tunnel was excavated in two years. The breakthrough took place on 2 September 1977. It carries one lane of traffic in each direction in one tube, which has 8.50 m (27.9 ft) clearance and 11.20 m (36.7 ft) width. The tunnel's elevation is at 1,820–1,795 m (5,971–5,889 ft) in the north-south direction.

In September 2013, it was announced that a new tunnel with the same name is projected at Zigana Pass. The tunnel was opened in 2023. It is a 14,481 m (47,510 ft)-long twin-tube tunnel carrying two lanes of traffic in each direction between Güzelyayla, Maçka and Köstere, Torul at 1,253–1,211 m (4,111–3,973 ft) elevation.
