= Salang River =

River in Afghanistan

Coordinates: 35°04′N 69°14′E

The Salang River (Note: Pashto: د سالنګ سیند Dari: رودخانه سالنگ) is a 438-kilometre-long river of Afghanistan, flowing through Parwan Province. It is a tributary of the Ghorband River and through that, it is also tributary to the nearby Panjshir and Kabul rivers as well as the Indus River in Pakistan.

== Geography ==
The Salang River originates on the south side of the central Hindu Kush mountains in the north-east of Salang Pass, which links the region to Kabul with the northern part of the country.

Its valley and the Salang Pass form an important international waterway. It is north–south oriented. The Salang flows into the Ghorband River at Jabal Saraj in Parwan. In Jabal Saraj, the average annual flow module between 1961 and 1964 was about 763 millimeters per year, which is considered a high rate.
