= North Salang =

- Location in Afghanistan
- Coordinates: 35.317°N 69.017°E
- Country: Afghanistan
- Province: Baghlan
- District: Khinjan
- Elevation: 11,152 ft (3,399 m)
- Time zone: + 4.30

North Salang or Sālangi Shamāli (Persian: سالنگ شمالی, Pashto: شمالي سالنګ) is a village at an altitude of 3,365 meters in the Khinjan District of Baghlan Province in north-eastern Afghanistan, to the northern side of the Salang Tunnel.

== Climate ==
North Salang has a tundra climate (Köppen: ET) with cool to mild summers and very cold winters. Precipitation is significantly higher than in much of the rest of Afghanistan due to North Salang's location on the windward side of the Hindu Kush mountain range, and mostly falls in the form of snow.

Climate data for North Salang, Afghanistan (1960-1983)
Month	Jan	Feb	Mar	Apr	May	Jun	Jul	Aug	Sep	Oct	Nov	Dec	Year
Record high °C (°F)	4.0 (39.2)	3.8 (38.8)	9.5 (49.1)	11.6 (52.9)	15.5 (59.9)	20.5 (68.9)	22.1 (71.8)	20.7 (69.3)	18.0 (64.4)	16.0 (60.8)	10.2 (50.4)	6.5 (43.7)	22.1 (71.8)
Mean daily maximum °C (°F)	−6.6 (20.1)	−5.3 (22.5)	−1.1 (30.0)	3.8 (38.8)	7.2 (45.0)	12.2 (54.0)	14.3 (57.7)	13.5 (56.3)	9.6 (49.3)	5.4 (41.7)	0.2 (32.4)	−4.2 (24.4)	4.1 (39.3)
Daily mean °C (°F)	−10.3 (13.5)	−9.5 (14.9)	−5.4 (22.3)	−0.1 (31.8)	2.9 (37.2)	7.5 (45.5)	9.7 (49.5)	8.6 (47.5)	4.7 (40.5)	0.7 (33.3)	−4.0 (24.8)	−7.8 (18.0)	−0.2 (31.6)
Mean daily minimum °C (°F)	−18.7 (−1.7)	−13.1 (8.4)	−8.4 (16.9)	−3.5 (25.7)	−0.5 (31.1)	3.4 (38.1)	5.6 (42.1)	4.5 (40.1)	0.5 (32.9)	−2.6 (27.3)	−7.5 (18.5)	−10.9 (12.4)	−4.3 (24.3)
Record low °C (°F)	−30.3 (−22.5)	−29.0 (−20.2)	−27.8 (−18.0)	−16.1 (3.0)	−11.0 (12.2)	−7.0 (19.4)	−0.5 (31.1)	−2.6 (27.3)	−8.9 (16.0)	−15.6 (3.9)	−19.8 (−3.6)	−26.8 (−16.2)	−30.3 (−22.5)
Average precipitation mm (inches)	108.7 (4.28)	142.0 (5.59)	185.9 (7.32)	197.8 (7.79)	123.7 (4.87)	10.0 (0.39)	6.8 (0.27)	6.7 (0.26)	7.5 (0.30)	30.2 (1.19)	68.4 (2.69)	104.3 (4.11)	992.0 (39.06)
Average rainy days	0	0	1	3	7	3	2	1	1	1	1	0	20
Average snowy days	13	15	18	15	10	1	0	0	1	6	8	11	98
Average relative humidity (%)	64	69	71	74	71	58	53	54	58	60	59	61	63
Mean monthly sunshine hours	112.8	105.8	128.4	154.5	215.1	269.9	287.6	276.6	226.5	184.3	149.4	118.5	2,229.4
Percentage possible sunshine	37	35	35	40	50	63	66	67	62	54	49	40	51
Source: NOAA (precipitation and humidity 1959-1983)

== See also ==
- Baghlan Province
