= 1992 Görmeç avalanche =

- Görmeç, Şırnak, Turkey
- Date: 1 February 1992
- Location: Görmeç, Şırnak, Turkey; 37°32′43″N 42°12′50″E
- Cause: Avalanche
- Outcome: 71 soldiers and 26 villagers dead
- Deaths: 97

The 1992 Görmeç avalanche was an avalanche that occurred on 1 February 1992, in Görmeç, Şırnak Province in south-east Turkey, killing 97 people including 71 soldiers.

== See also ==
- List of avalanches
