= 2009 Afghan avalanches =

Natural disaster in Afghanistan

Coordinates: 35°19′19.91″N 69°1′36.72″E

- Salang Tunnel in relation to Afghanistan
- Date: January 16, 2009
- Location: near Kabul, Afghanistan
- Deaths: At least 10

The 2009 Afghan avalanches occurred near Kabul, Afghanistan on 16 January 2009. At least ten people were killed and twelve vehicles and machinery used to clear the road of snow were swept away when the avalanche struck a highway. Forty people were rescued, eleven of whom were injured by the avalanches. The avalanches struck the southern part of the Salang tunnel, the main highway linking southern and northern Afghanistan in the middle of the Hindu Kush mountains, at an altitude of 4,450 metres (14,600 ft). Searchers spent the next two days and beyond locating the victims.
