= Union nationale des centres sportifs de plein air =

French outdoor activities non-profit organization

UCPA
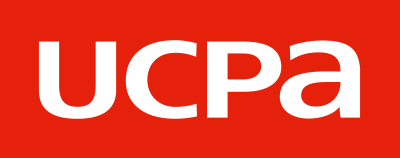
- Official logotype 2015-
- Formation: 1965
- Purpose: Promoting sporting activities for young people
- Headquarters: Paris
- Founder: Maurice Herzog
- Website: http://www.ucpa.com/

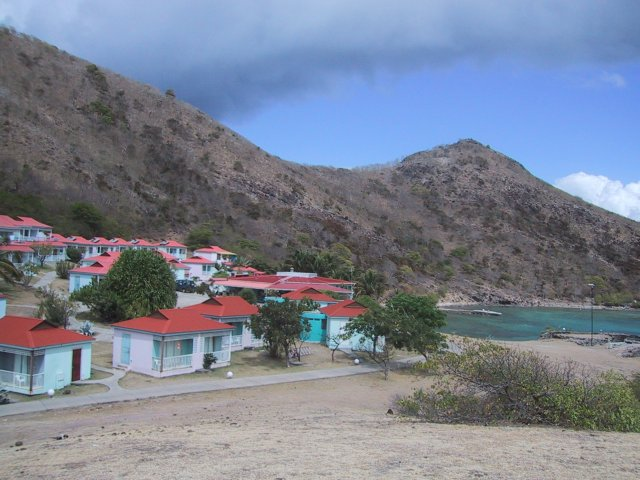
"Les Saintes" UCPA center

The Union nationale des centres sportifs de plein air (French pronunciation: [ynjɔ̃ nɑsjɔnal de sɑ̃tʁ(ə) spɔʁtif də plɛn‿ɛːʁ]), shortened to UCPA (French: [y se pe a]), is a non-profit French organization that makes outdoor sports holidays available for people of ages 18-45 (18-55 for advanced and expert courses). Formed in 1965, it is a union of government bodies, sports federations and youth associations. About 250,000 people travel with UCPA annually.

UCPA has three areas of operation:

- sports holidays
- recreation sports outreach
- vocational training for careers in sport

UCPA is mainly located in France, but is also present in some fifty countries around the world.
