= Salang mountains =

Mountain range in Afghanistan

Coordinates: 35°19′18″N 69°1′32″E

Salang mountains are found in Parwan Province and Baghlan Province in northeastern Afghanistan.

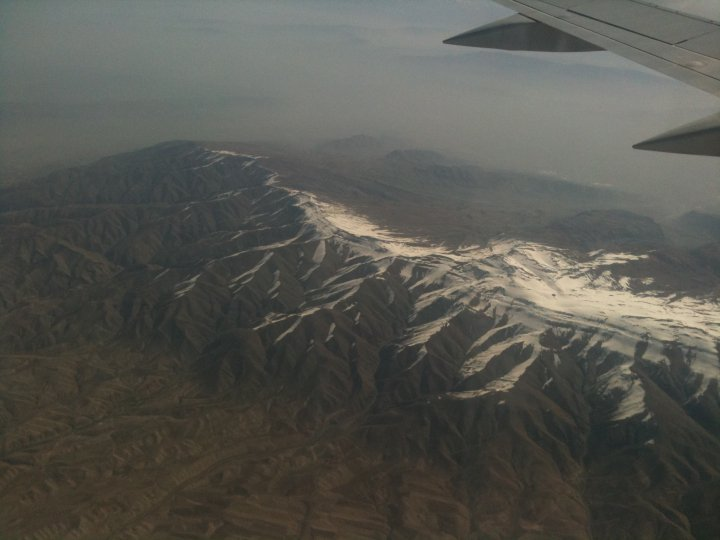
The Salang mountain range as seen from an airplane in Afghanistan.

These mountains lie between the cities of Charikar in the south and Baghlan in the north.
