= Zigana Pass =

Mountain pass in Turkey

- Zigana Geçidi
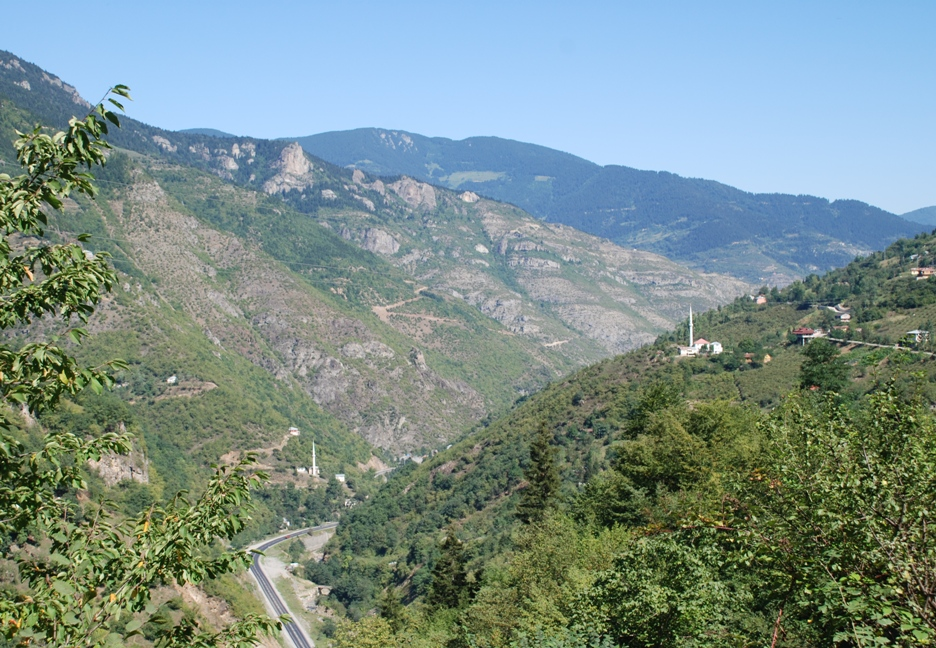
- Zigana Pass

- Location within Turkey
- Elevation: 2,032 metres (6,667 ft)
- Traversed by: Route D.885 E97

Third Approach
- Location: Gümüşhane Province, Turkey
- Range: Pontic Mountains
- Coordinates: 40°38′56.4″N 39°23′34.08″E

The Zigana Pass (Turkish: Zigana Geçidi) is a mountain pass situated on the Pontic Mountains in Gümüşhane Province close to its border with Trabzon Province in northeastern Turkey. The pass, at 2,032 m (6,667 ft) above sea level, is on the route D.885 E97 at a distance of 60 km (37 mi) from Gümüşhane and 120 km (75 mi) from Trabzon at the Black Sea coast. The pass is snow-covered five months a year.

The Zigana Tunnel under the pass, at an elevation of 1,795 m (5,889 ft) above sea level, is 1,702 m (5,584 ft) long, 11 m (36 ft) wide and has a maximum height of 8 m (26 ft). It is one of longest tunnels in the country.

The namesake village of Zigana, located 3.5 km (2.2 mi) southwest of the tunnel, is a popular ski-resort.

Nearby Lake Limni is reachable on foot by a 3 km (2 mi) trail or by car on a 19 km (12 mi) road (partly unpaved) via Kalkanlı village.

On 25 January 2009, 11 hikers on Mount Zigana died in an avalanche.

Zingana pass is the pass through which the Ten Thousand of Xenophon passed through on their way out of Persia ("Ξενοφων «καθοδος των μυριων") and shouted Thalatta! Thalatta! ( the sea! the sea!) when they saw the coast of Trabzon (Τραπεζουντα) at the Black Sea.

== Gallery ==
Lilies at Zigana Pass

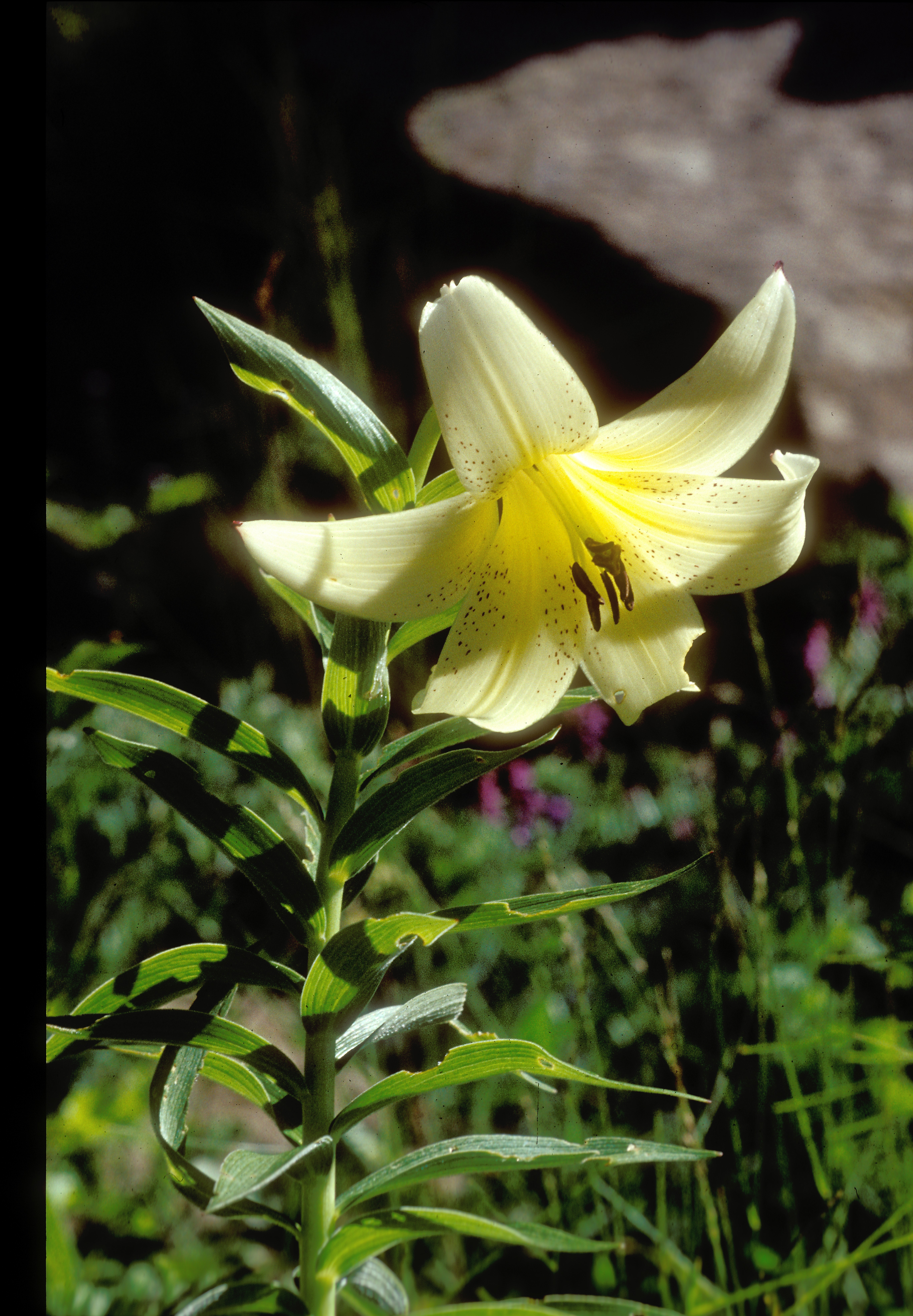

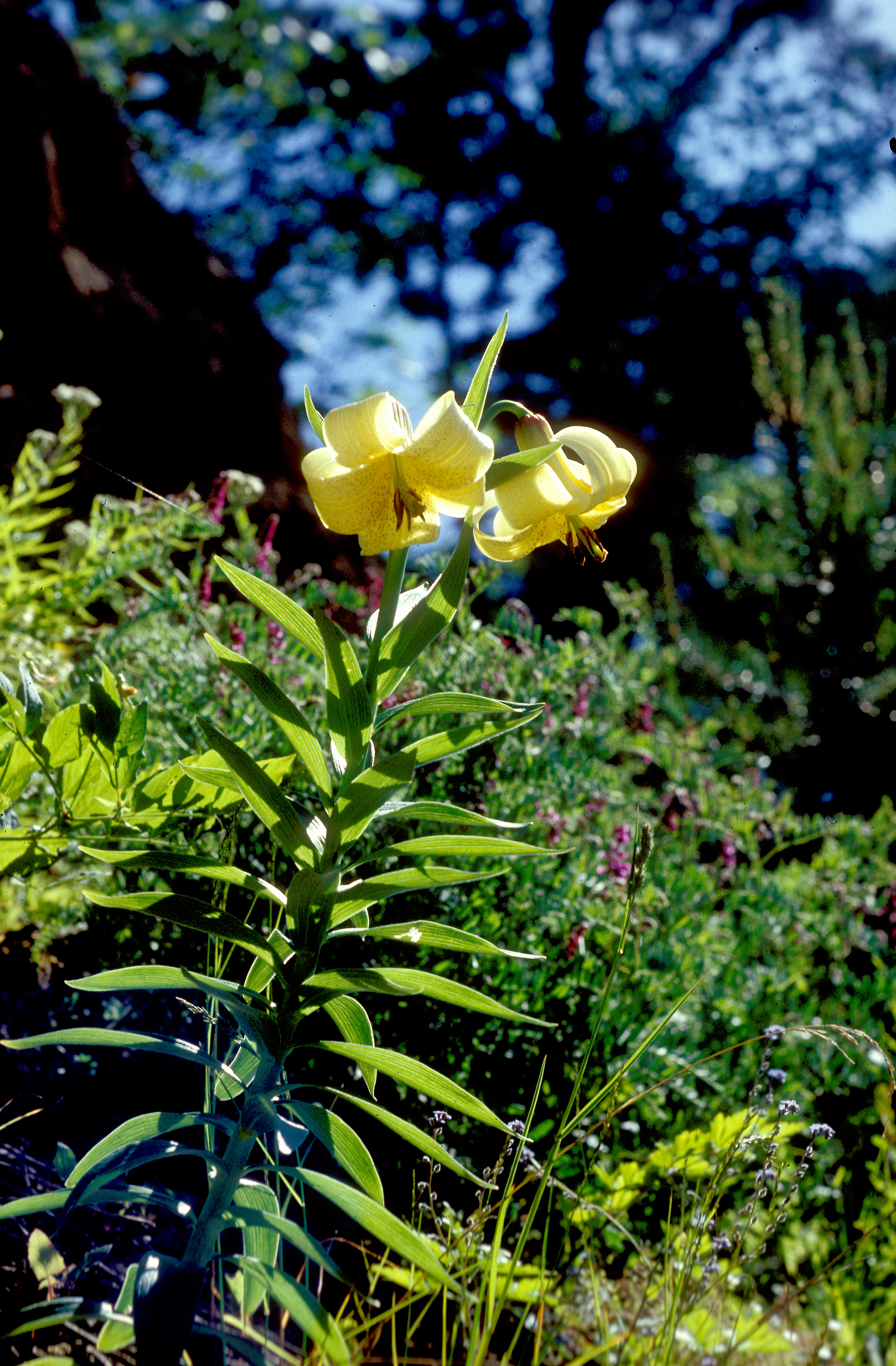

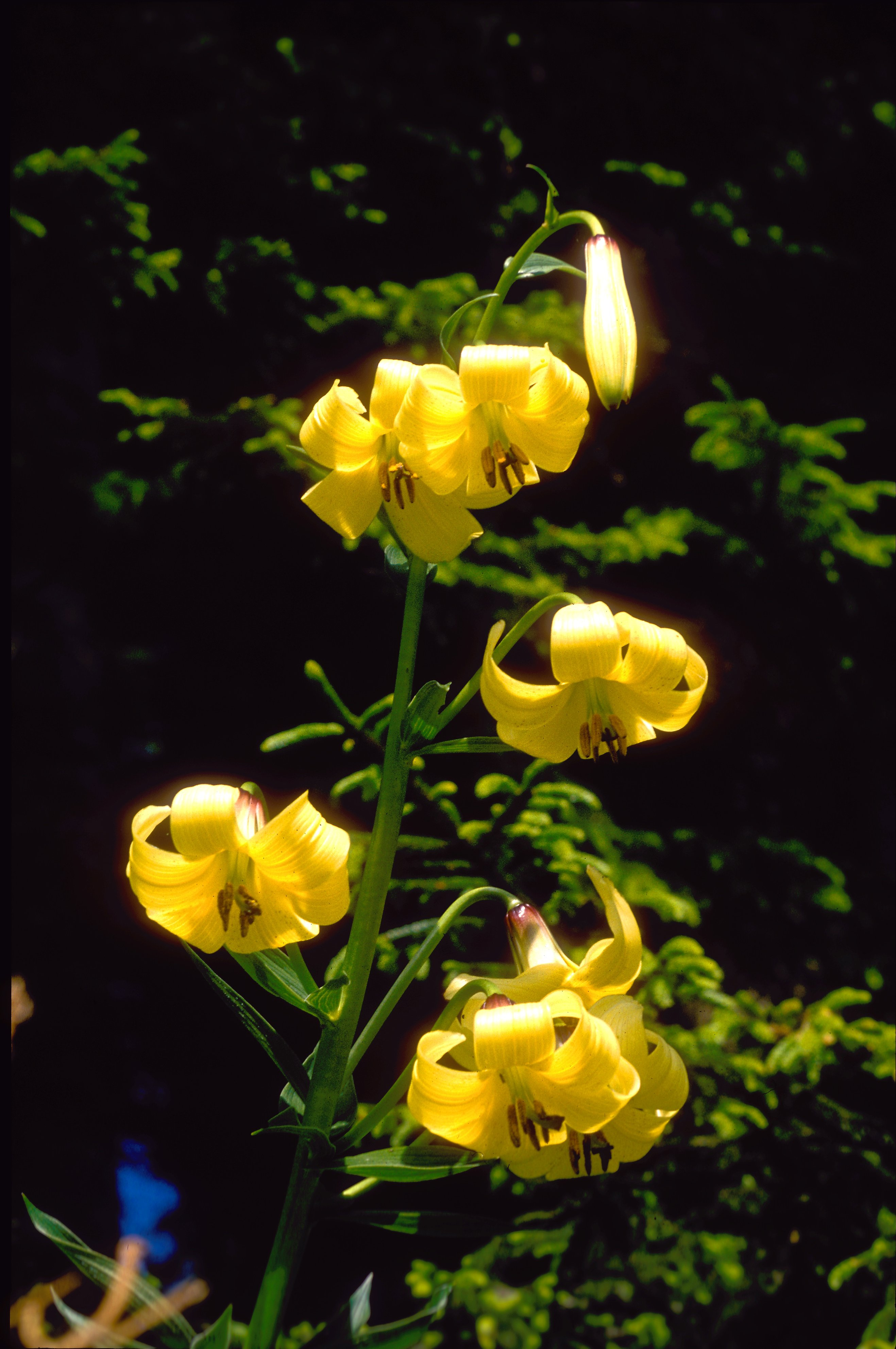

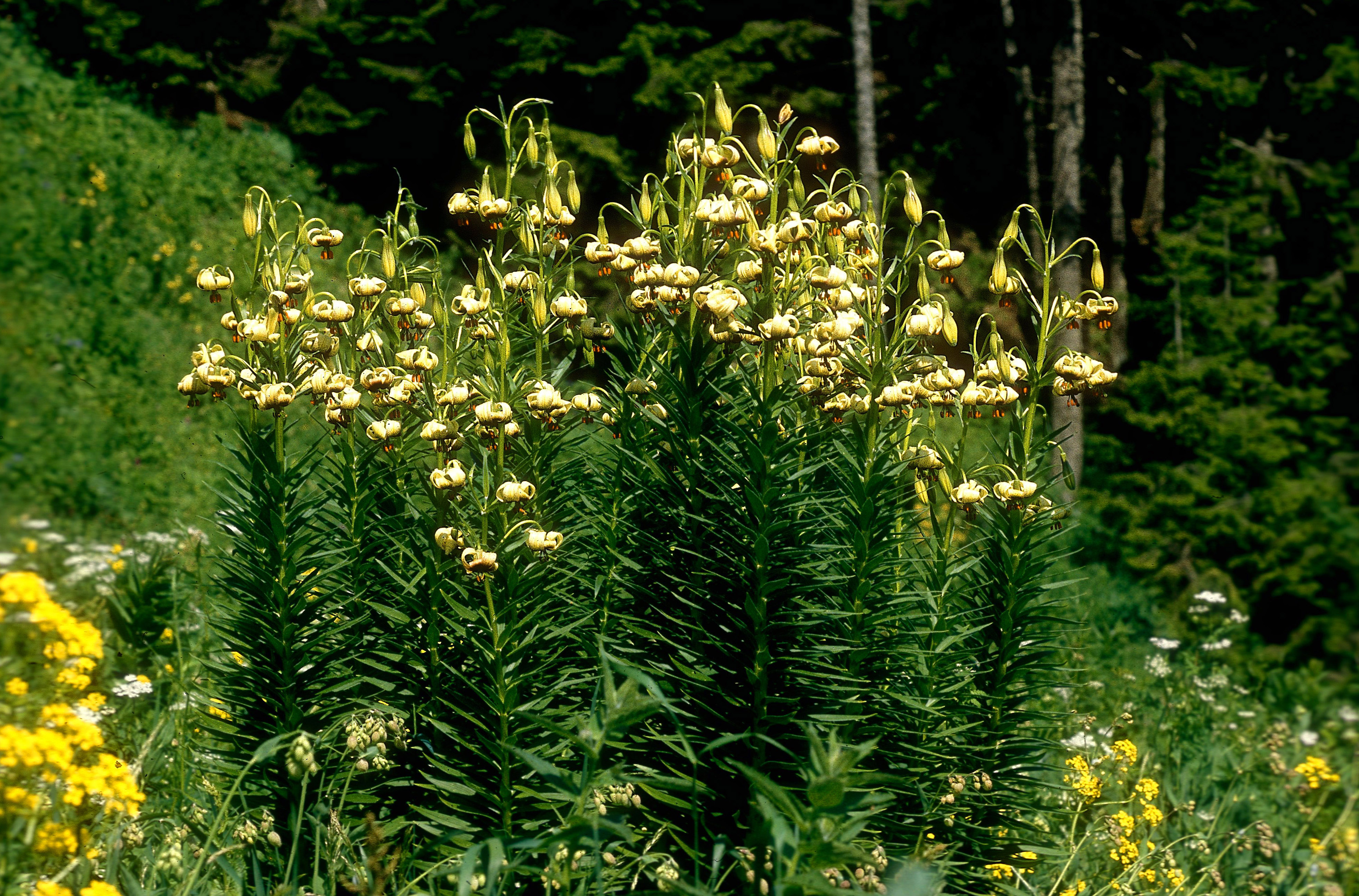
