= Salang Pass =

Mountain pass in eastern Afghanistan

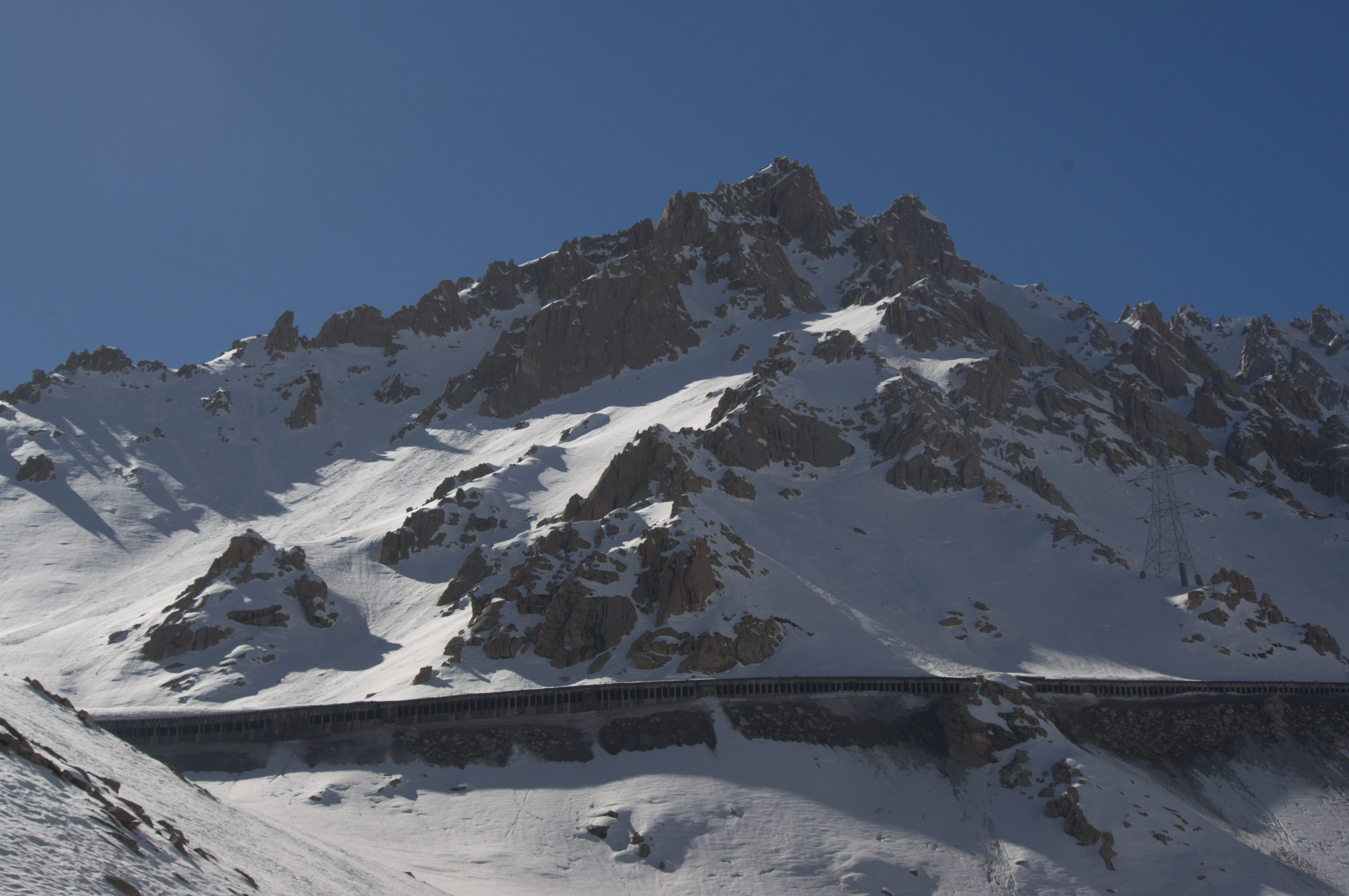
- One of the galleries at the Salang Pass

- Location within Afghanistan
- Elevation: 3,878 m (12,723 ft)

Location
- Location: Parwan-Baghlan, Afghanistan
- Range: Hindu Kush
- Coordinates: 35°18′49.44″N 69°02′13.51″E

The Salang Pass (Dari: كتل سالنگ Kutal-i Salang; Pashto: د سالنګ کوتل Da Salang Kutal, el. 3,878 m or 12,723 ft) is a high-altitude mountain pass in Afghanistan's Hindu Kush mountains, which has long served as the primary economic and logistical lifeline connecting the northern provinces with the rest of the country. The southern part of the pass is located in Parwan Province and the northern part in Baghlan Province. The Salang Pass and the Kushan Pass were of great importance in early times as they provided the most direct connections between Kabulistan with northern Afghanistan or Tokharistan. The Salang River originates nearby and flows south.

The Salang Tunnel is located in the southern part of the Salang Pass. It is at a height of about 3,400 m (11,200 ft) and marks as the jurisdictional boundary between Parwan and Baghlan provinces. It was built between 1958 and 1964 with Soviet Union assistance. In 1997, the tunnel was partially blown-up by Ahmad Shah Massoud's Northern Alliance in order to prevent forces of the Islamic Emirate of Afghanistan (1996–2001) (Taliban) from passing through it. In 2002 the Russian Ministry Of Emergency Situations organized the work to rebuild the tunnel and the repairs were completed within a month.

The Salang Pass links Kabul in the south with Mazar-i-Sharif and Kunduz in the north. Before the road and tunnel were built, the main route between Kabul and northern Afghanistan was via the Shibar Pass, a much longer route which took three days. The road through the pass has carried heavy military traffic in recent conflicts and is in a sub-optimal condition as a result.

== February 2010 avalanches ==
On February 9, 2010, the pass was hit by multiple avalanches. According to press reports the road through the pass was hit by 17 avalanches, killing dozens, burying miles of highway, and trapping the vehicles in the Salang tunnel. By February 10, 2010, authorities had recovered over 160 bodies. Radio Free Europe reported the first avalanche blocked the tunnel, and trapped vehicles in a traffic jam in a "deadly avalanche zone".

== Gallery ==
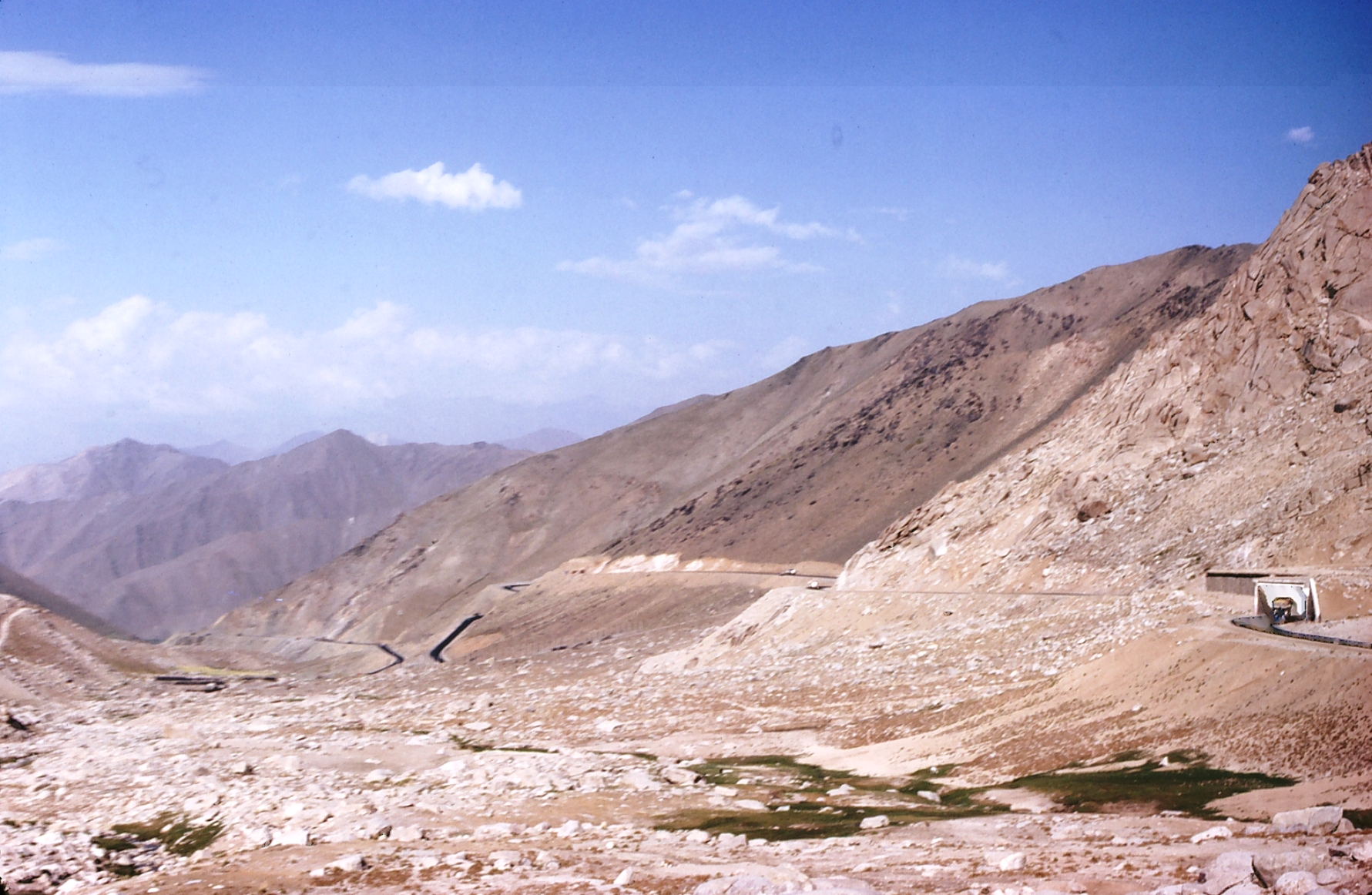
Salang Pass view in 1977

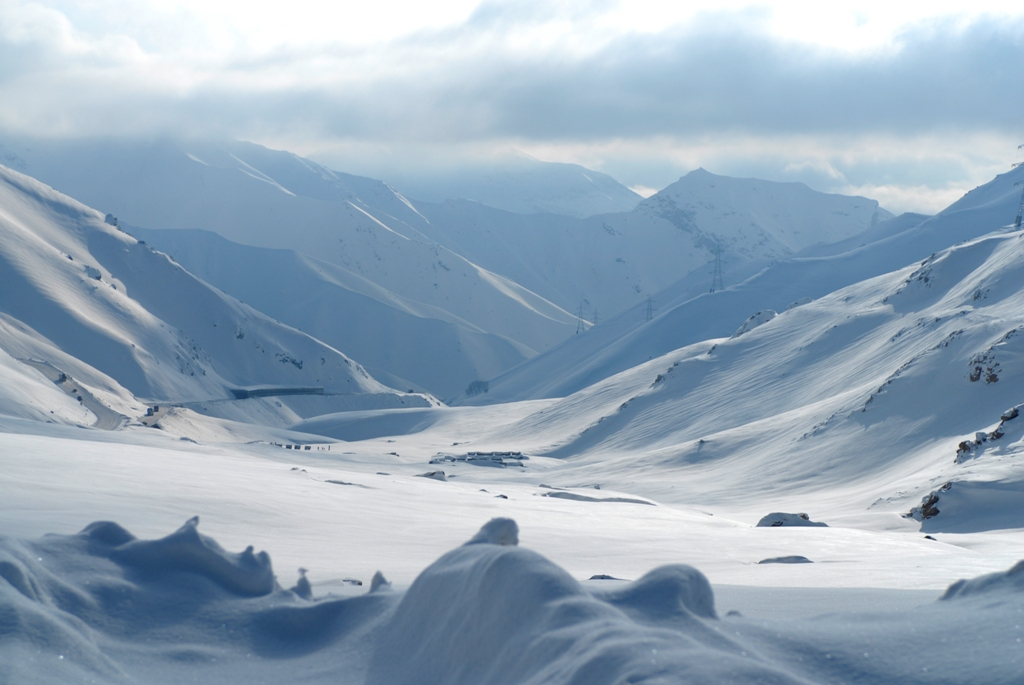
The Salang Pass with heavy snow on 30 January 2009

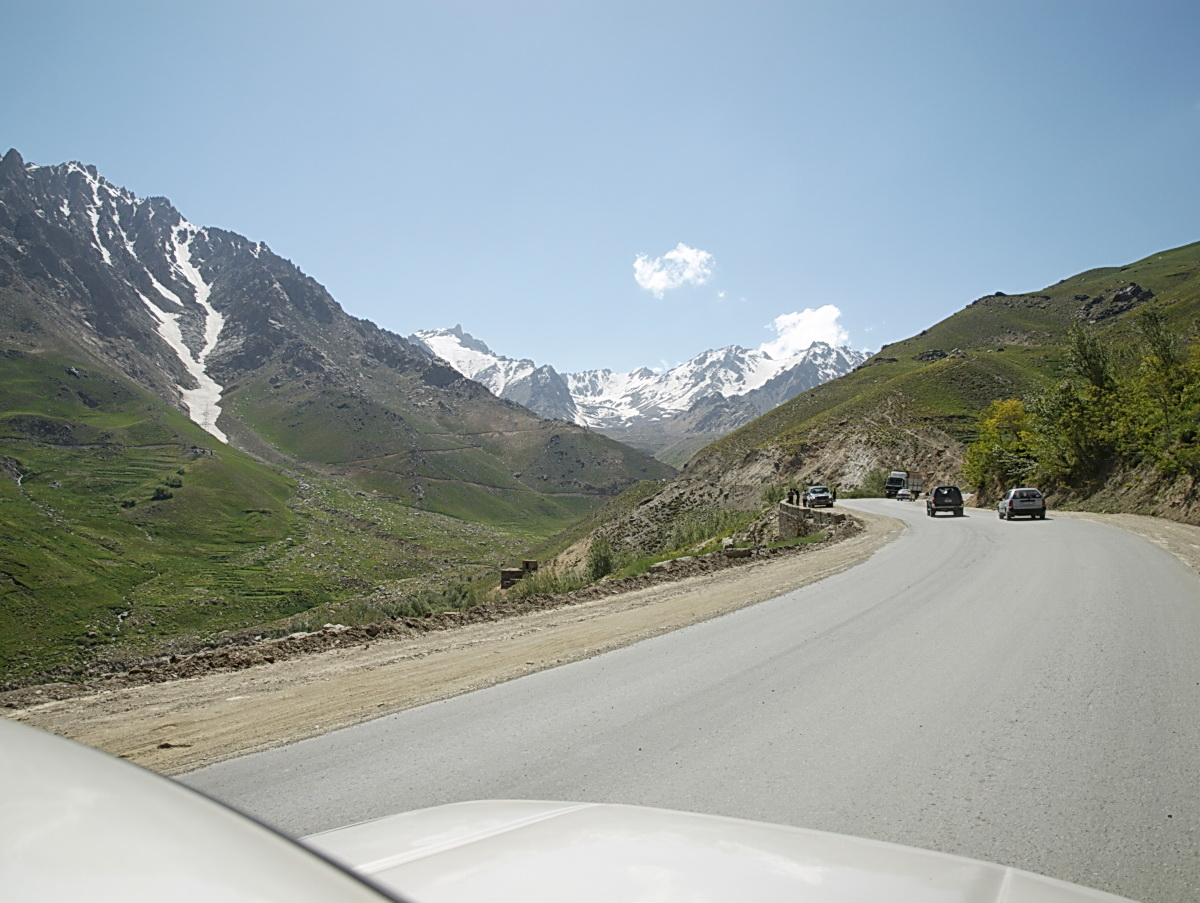
On the way to Salang Pass

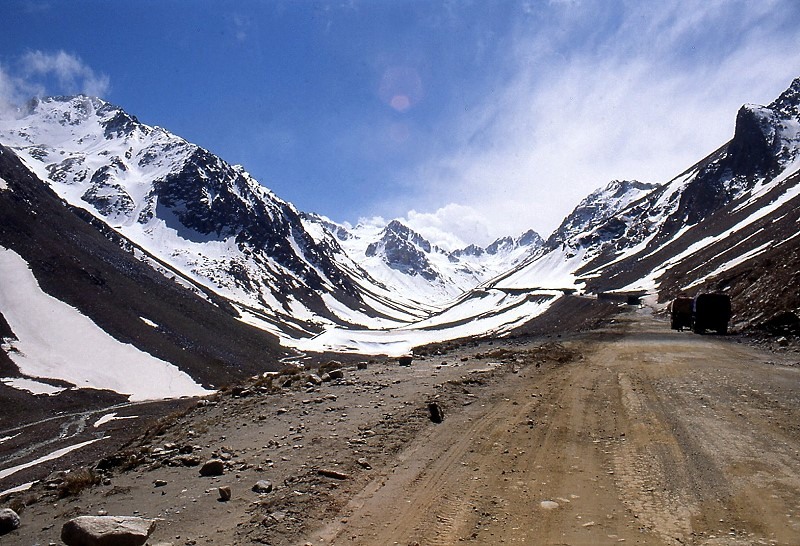
Salang Pass view in 2004

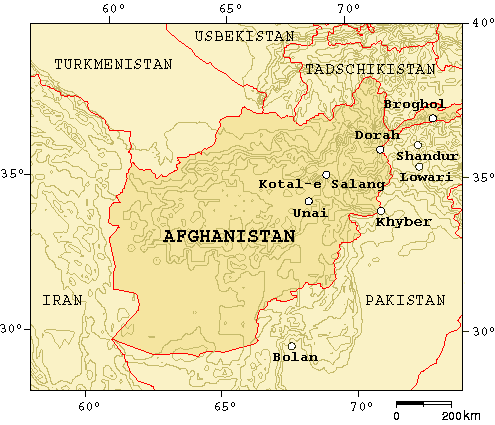
Map showing mountain passes of Afghanistan

== See also ==
- Khost-Gardez Pass
- Wakhjir Pass
- Khyber Pass
- Khojak Pass
- North Salang, nearby village
- List of mountain passes
