= 2009 Zigana avalanche =

Natural disaster in Turkey

Coordinates: 40°38′56.4″N 39°23′34.08″E

- Mt. Zigana in relation to Turkey
- Date: January 25, 2009
- Time: 11:15 EET (09:15 UTC)
- Location: Mount Zigana, Gümüşhane Province, Turkey
- Deaths: 11
- Injuries: 1

The 2009 Zigana avalanche was an avalanche that occurred on 25 January at around 11:15 local time (09:15 UTC) on Mount Zigana, Gümüşhane Province in north-eastern Turkey. It struck a group of 17 hikers at a height of 2,200 m (7,200 ft) near the site of a small ski resort. The snow mass dragged the hikers about 1,000 m (3,300 ft) into a valley. Ten people were killed, one person was rescued with injuries and another one died in hospital while five others survived without injuries.

Teams from civilian defense and other public administrations rushed to the scene for the rescue of the victims from a sports club in Trabzon after local gendarmerie was notified of the incident. Also a team of AKUT, a voluntary disaster search and rescue organization, travelled from Trabzon to the location, to assess the situation and to offer any help and assistance necessary.

Nasuh Mahruki, the first Turkish Mount Everest summiteer and the head of AKUT, said that "the accident was a walking group accident, not a mountain climbing accident. It is apparent that they hit the road without an avalanche test. It is very difficult for 16 to 17 people to remain under an avalanche."

== See also ==
- Zigana Pass
