= Salang Tunnel =

Road tunnel in northern Afghanistan

Coordinates: 35°19′19.5″N 69°1′37.0″E

The Salang Tunnel (Dari: تونل سالنگ Tuner-e Sālang, Pashto: د سالنگ تونل Da Sālang Tūnel) is a 2.67-kilometre-long (1.66 mi) tunnel located at the Salang Pass in northern Parwan Province of Afghanistan, about 90 km (56 mi) north of the nation's capital, Kabul. At nearly 3,400 m (11,200 ft) above sea level, the tunnel work was originally completed by the Soviet Union in 1964.

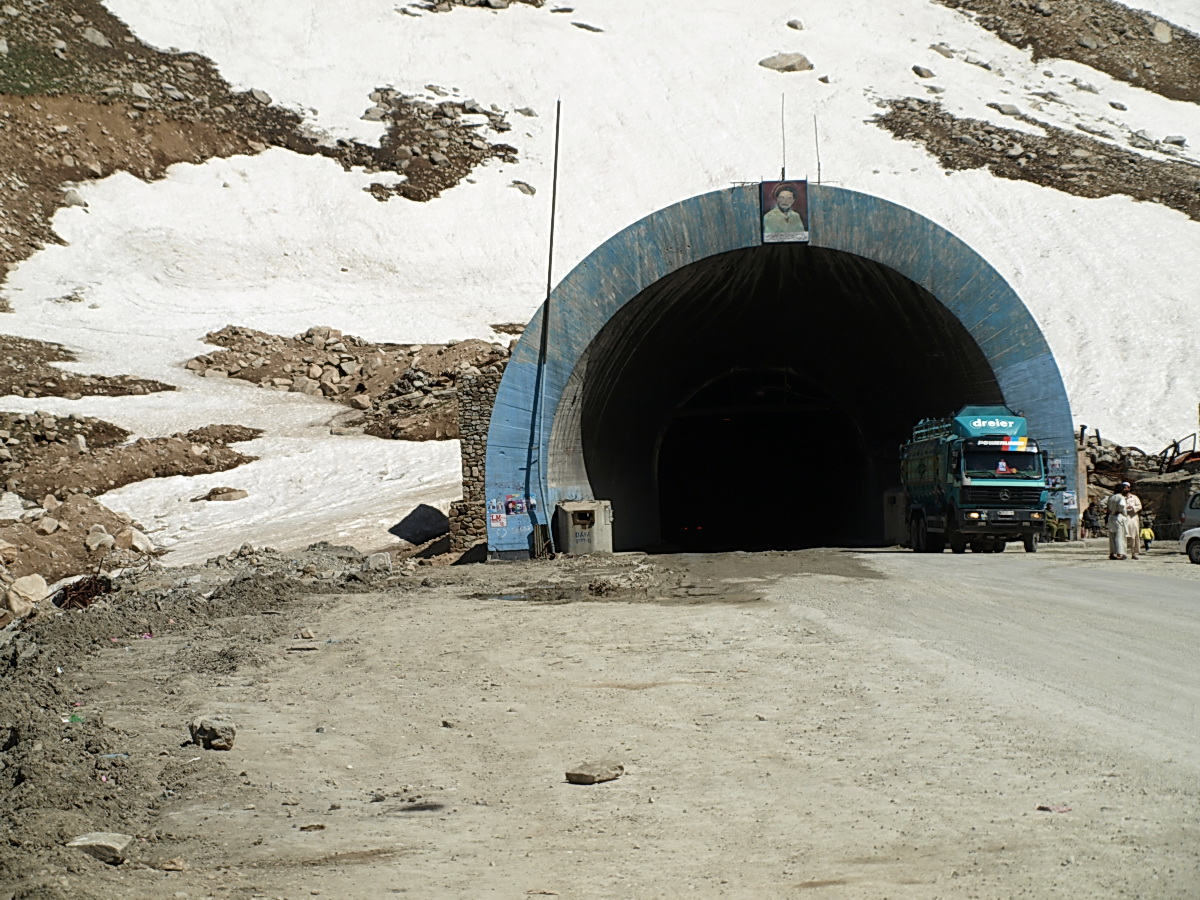
One of two portals of the Salang Tunnel in 2009

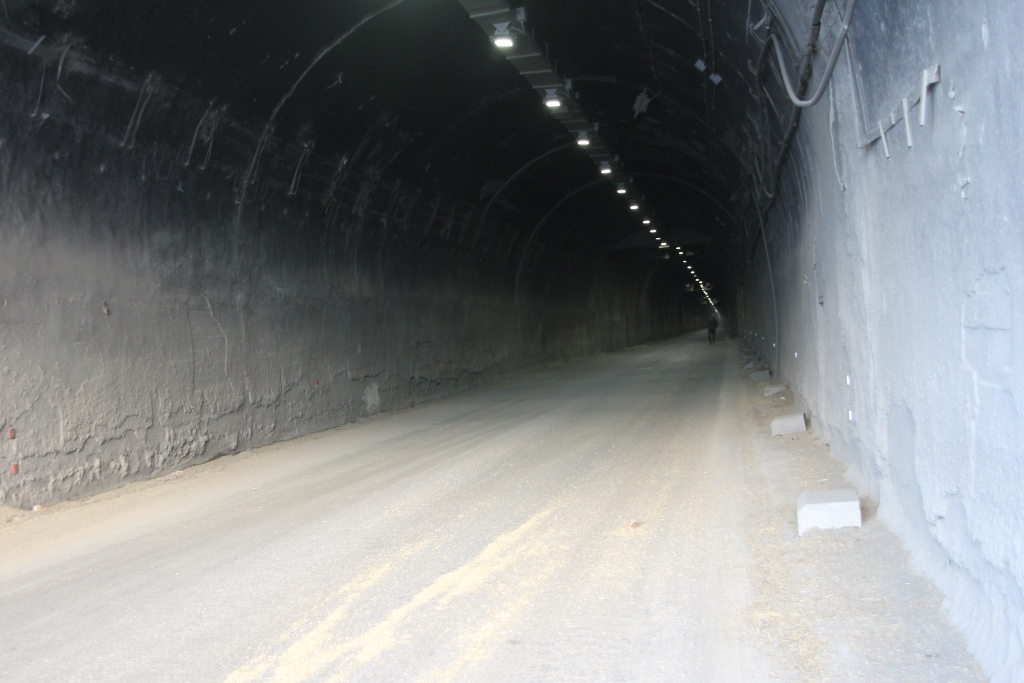
Inside the tunnel in 2013

The Salang Tunnel is of strategic importance as it connects by road Central Asia with South Asia, and is the only pass going in a north–south direction to remain in use throughout the year, although it is often closed during the cold winters by heavy snowfall.

== Overview ==
The tunnel represents the major north–south connection in Afghanistan, cutting travel time from 72 hours to 10 hours and saving about 300 kilometres (190 mi). It reaches an altitude of about 3,400 metres (11,200 ft) and is 2.6 kilometres (1.6 mi) long. The width and height of the tunnel tube are 7 metres (23 ft). Other sources say that the tunnel is no more than 6.1 metres (20 ft) wide at the base and 4.9 metres (16 ft) high, but only in the centre.

It was noted in 2010 that about 16,000 vehicles pass through the Salang Tunnel daily. Other reports say that the tunnel was designed for 1,000 vehicles a day, but is now handling seven to ten thousand vehicles a day.

It forms part of Highway 1 (Ring Road).

== History ==
In 1955, Afghanistan and the Soviet Union signed an agreement to initiate joint development of the Salang road, initially via the historic Salang Pass route. The tunnel was opened in 1964 and provided a year-round connection from the northern parts of the country to Kabul. The tunnel was the highest road tunnel in the world until 1973, when the state of Colorado built the Eisenhower Tunnel — just slightly higher and slightly longer — in the Rocky Mountains.

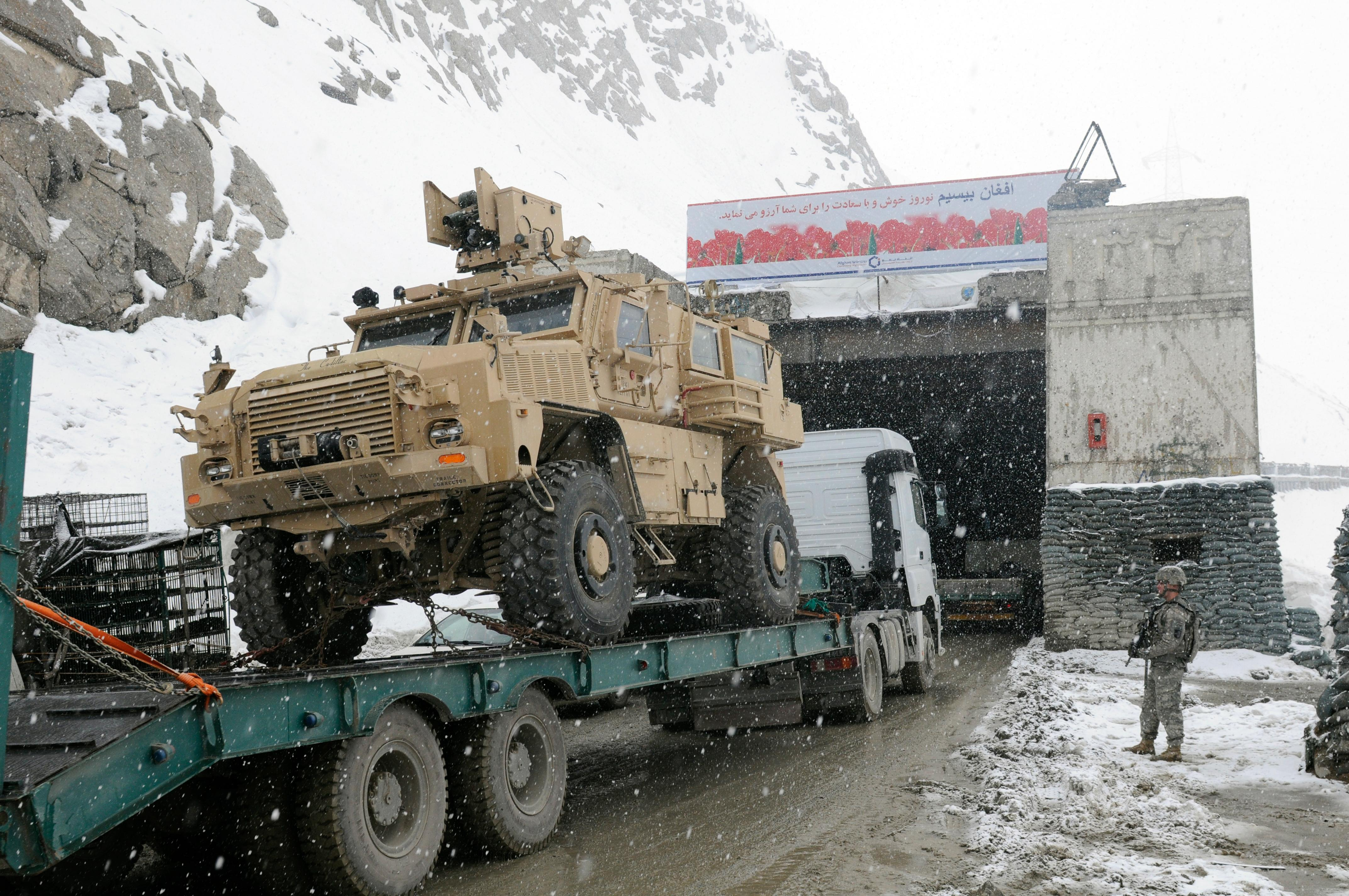
American military convoy entering the Salang Tunnel, 2011

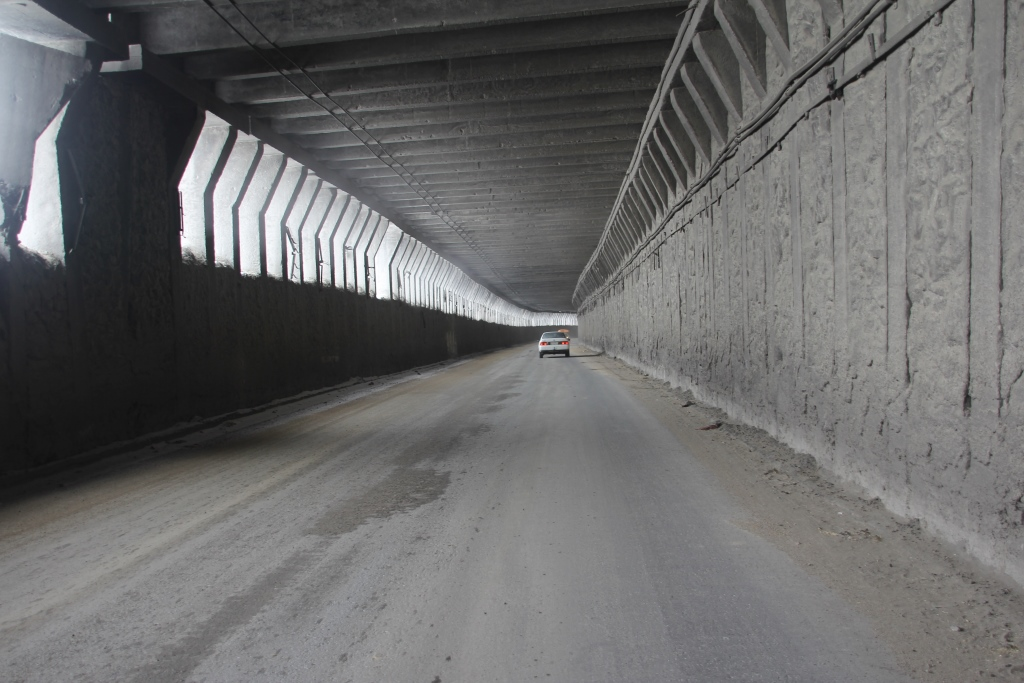
Inside one of the avalanche galleries at the Salang Pass in 2013

A ventilation system was built in 1976. During the Soviet–Afghan War, the tunnel was a crucial military link to the south, yet was prone to ambushes by the Afghan mujahideen fighters.

After the 1989 Soviet withdrawal from Afghanistan, maintenance suffered, and eventually, in the course of combat between the Northern Alliance and the Taliban in 1997–1998, the tunnel's entrances, lighting and ventilation system were destroyed, so that it could only be transited by foot in the dark. After the overthrow of the Taliban-led government in the 2001 US invasion of Afghanistan, a joint effort of agencies from Afghanistan, France, Russia, the United States and others cleared the mines and debris and reopened the tunnel on January 19, 2002.

In the early 2010s it was still receiving ISAF funding for repair and renovation.

In 2012, the United States Agency for International Development (USAID) made a technical study for a new tunnel reaching from the Olang region in Parwan province (about 6km south) to DoShakh in Baghlan province (about 10km north), going through the mountains of the Hindu Kush, further than the current tunnel. The design shortened travel distance by 30 to 40 km (19 to 25 mi).

In 2023, major construction work was done inside and outside the tunnel.

== Incidents ==
=== 1980 accident ===
On February 23, 1980 as a result of a road collision, a Soviet Army convoy was trapped and 16 of its servicemen suffocated from exhaust gases.

=== 1982 fire ===
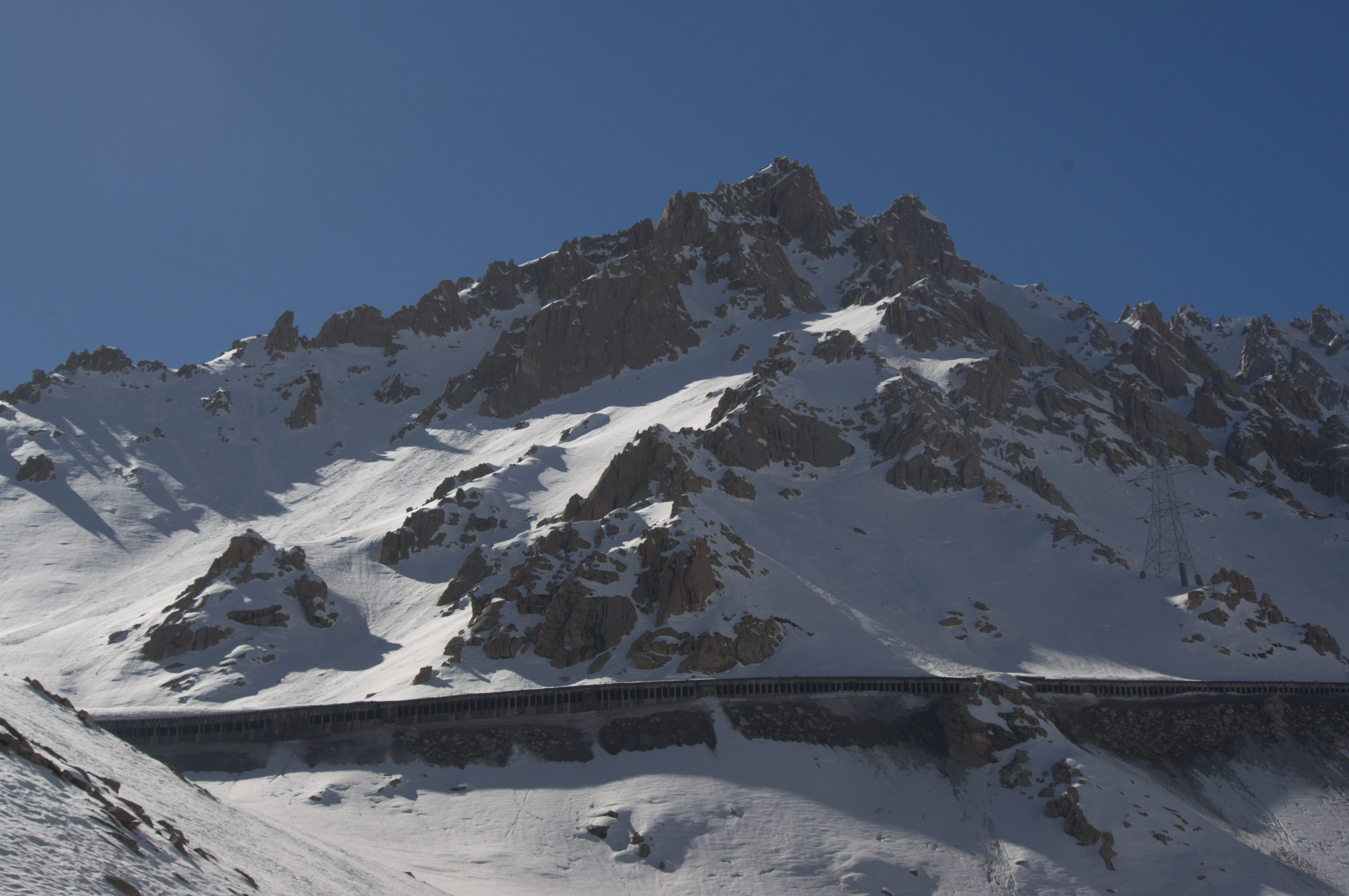
An avalanche gallery on the road to the Salang Tunnel in March of 2010

On November 3, 1982 a deadly fire killed an estimated 64 Soviet soldiers and 112 Afghans based on Soviet sources; apparently after a collision, a tanker truck blew up in the tunnel, and the fire engulfed a military convoy. Western sources estimate as many as 2,700-3,000 fatalities.

=== 2002 avalanche ===
Several weeks after reopening several hundred people were trapped in the tunnel due to an avalanche at its southern end. While most people were rescued, some died from asphyxiation and freezing. After further rehabilitation in July 2004, the tunnel could carry two-way traffic.

=== 2009 avalanches ===
Avalanches in the approach to the tunnel killed at least ten people in January 2009.

=== 2010 avalanches ===
On February 8, 2010, a series of at least seventeen avalanches struck the area around the tunnel, burying miles of road, killing 175 people and stranding hundreds more. Hundreds of cars were buried in the snow. At least 400 injuries were reported.

The Afghan National Army and NATO used their helicopters to rescue at least 2,500 people who were trapped inside their vehicles.

The avalanches were caused by a sudden blizzard that struck the area, closing the tunnel and the roads around it on both side of the tunnel.

The tunnel was reopened on February 12, 2010.

=== 2022 fire ===
On 18 December 2022, a fuel tanker exploded, killing at least 31 people and injuring 37 others.

== See also ==
- Lists of tunnels
- Transport in Afghanistan
