= Vilborg Davíðsdóttir =

Icelandic writer and journalist (born 1965)

- Born: September 3, 1965 (age 59); Þingeyri, Ísafjarðarbær, Westfjords, Iceland
- Years active: 1993–present

Website
- davidsdottir.is/English.html

Vilborg Davíðsdóttir (born 3 September 1965, Þingeyri) is an Icelandic writer and journalist. She lives in Reykjavík.

== Education ==
Vilborg has a diploma in journalism, and a BA in English and Ethnology. She wrote her MA thesis in Ethnology about oral tradition and storytelling.

== Career ==
Much of Vilborg's fiction focuses on medieval European history, often with a focus on women and on Iceland and the surrounding area.

Her novels The Well of Fates (1993) and The Witches' Judgement (1994) concern a slave in the Viking era and are influenced by the Icelandic sagas. Her 1997 novel Eldfórnin follows a 14th-century nun.

Her 2005 novel Hrafninn explores contact between Norse Vikings and Inuit.

She has written a historical fiction trilogy about Auður Djúpúðga (Aud the Deep-Minded), one of Iceland's most famous female settlers. In 2019, Vilborg led a tour of Tiree in the Hebrides, retracing the path of the protagonist.

Vilborg's book Ástin, drekinn og dauðinn (On Love, Dragons and Dying) (2015), was a more personal story, following her husband's journey with terminal brain cancer, and her first year as a widow, during which both her mother-in-law and her father died as well.

Some of her books have been translated and published in The United States, Egypt, Germany and Faroe Islands.

== Works ==
- Land næturinnar (2023)
- Undir Yggdrasil (2020)
- Blóðug jörð (2017)
- Ástin, drekinn og dauðinn (2015)
- Vígroði (2012)
  - Published in English as Crimson Sky
- Auður (2009)
  - Published in English as Audur
- Hrafninn (2005)
  - Published in English as The Raven
- Felustaðurinn (2002)
- Korku saga - Við Urðarbrunn og Nornadómur (2001)
- Galdur (2000)
  - Published in English as On the Cold Coasts (2012)
- Eldfórnin (1997)
  - Published in English as The Sacrifice
- Nornadómur (1994)
  - Published in English as The Witches' Judgement
- Við Urðarbrunn (1993)
  - Published in English as The Well of Fates

== Awards and honours ==
- Icelandic IBBY
- The Reykjavik Educational Council Prize
