= I Think of Angels =

"I think of angels"

Song by KK, Ellen Kristjánsdóttir

from the album Gleðifólkið
- Released: 1995
- Songwriter(s): KK

"I think of angels" is a song written by Icelandic musician KK and performed by his sister, singer Ellen Kristjánsdóttir. It was released in 1995 on the album Gleðifólkið.

== Background ==
The song is about KK's older sister, Inger Ágústa Kristjánsdóttir, who died in a car accident in 1992. He wrote the song while waiting to go on stage during a concert in Flateyri shortly after her funeral. The song was first performed during a memorian service for the victims of the 1995 Súðavík avalanche.

== Cover ==
In 2021, the song was covered by Cat Power. The cover was featured in the film Flag Day, directed by Sean Penn.
