= Þingeyri =

- Village
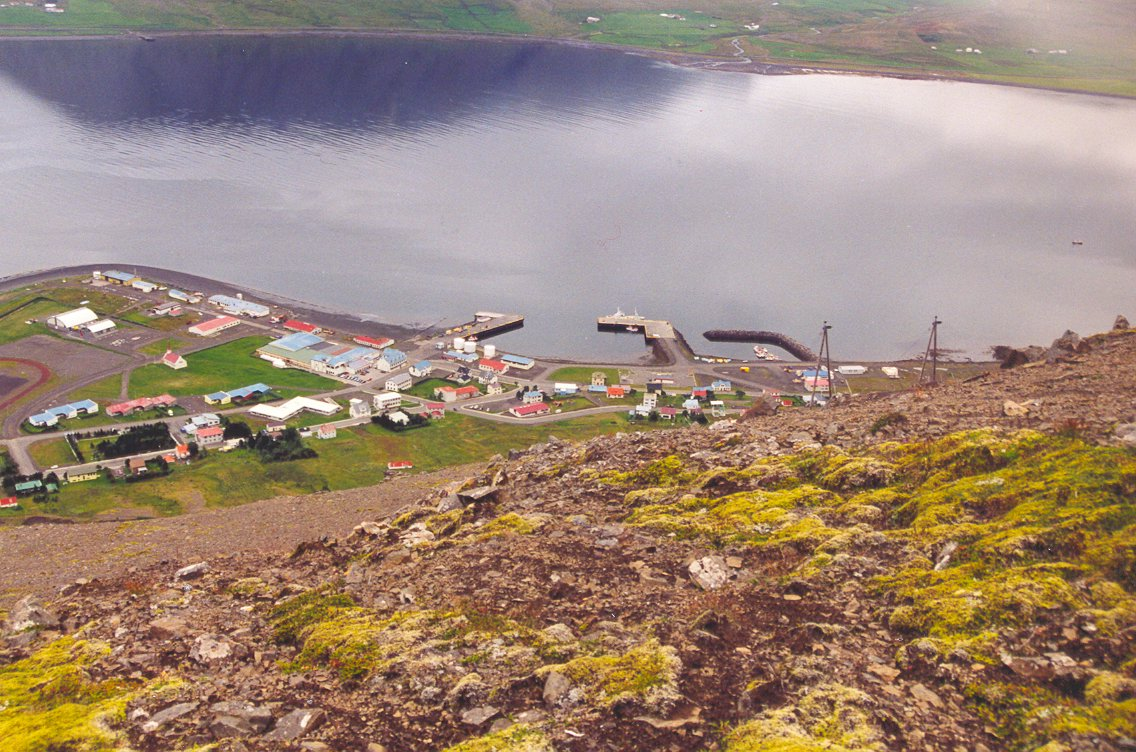
- Þingeyri

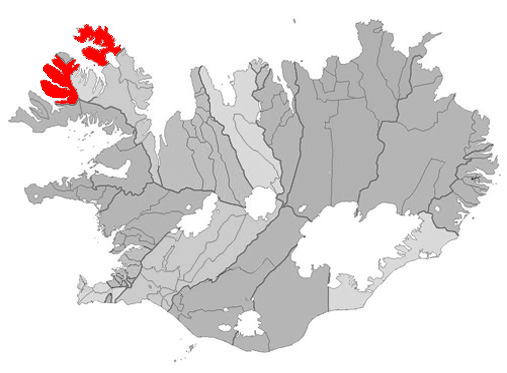
- Location of the Municipality of Ísafjarðarbær

- Location within Iceland
- Coordinates: 65°52′N 23°30′W
- Country: Iceland
- Constituency: Northwest Constituency
- Region: Westfjords
- Municipality: Ísafjarðarbær

Population (1 January 2020)
  - Village: 326
  - Urban: 262
  - Metro: 64
- Time zone: UTC+0 (GMT)
- Póstnúmer: 470, 471
- Website: Official website

Þingeyri ([ˈθiŋkˌeiːrɪ], regionally also [ˈθɪŋk-]) is a settlement in the municipality of Ísafjarðarbær, Iceland.

It is located on the coast of Dýrafjörður fjord in the mountainous peninsula Westfjords (in Icelandic written Vestfirðir). On 1 January 2019, it had a population of 246. It has an airport.

Continually inhabited since 1787, Þingeyri is one of the oldest settlements in the Westfjords and the first trading post established there. It is believed to derive its name from a medieval assembly (þing) and has ruins of a medieval booth believed to have been used by visitors to the assembly.

Hafnarstræti 5 - Salthúsio - built in 1732 - a salt house and warehouse - the oldest surviving building in Pingeyri.

Thanks to its sheltered location Þingeyri developed into a significant fishing center. In the 19th century the French applied for permission to establish a base there to support their fishing operations in the area but were turned down.

From 1884-98, the town served as the base for American halibut fishing in the region. In 1909 a hospital was founded in the village and in 1910-1911 a church was established. In 1957 an airport for medical transport, with a runway of 300×20 meters, was taken into use.

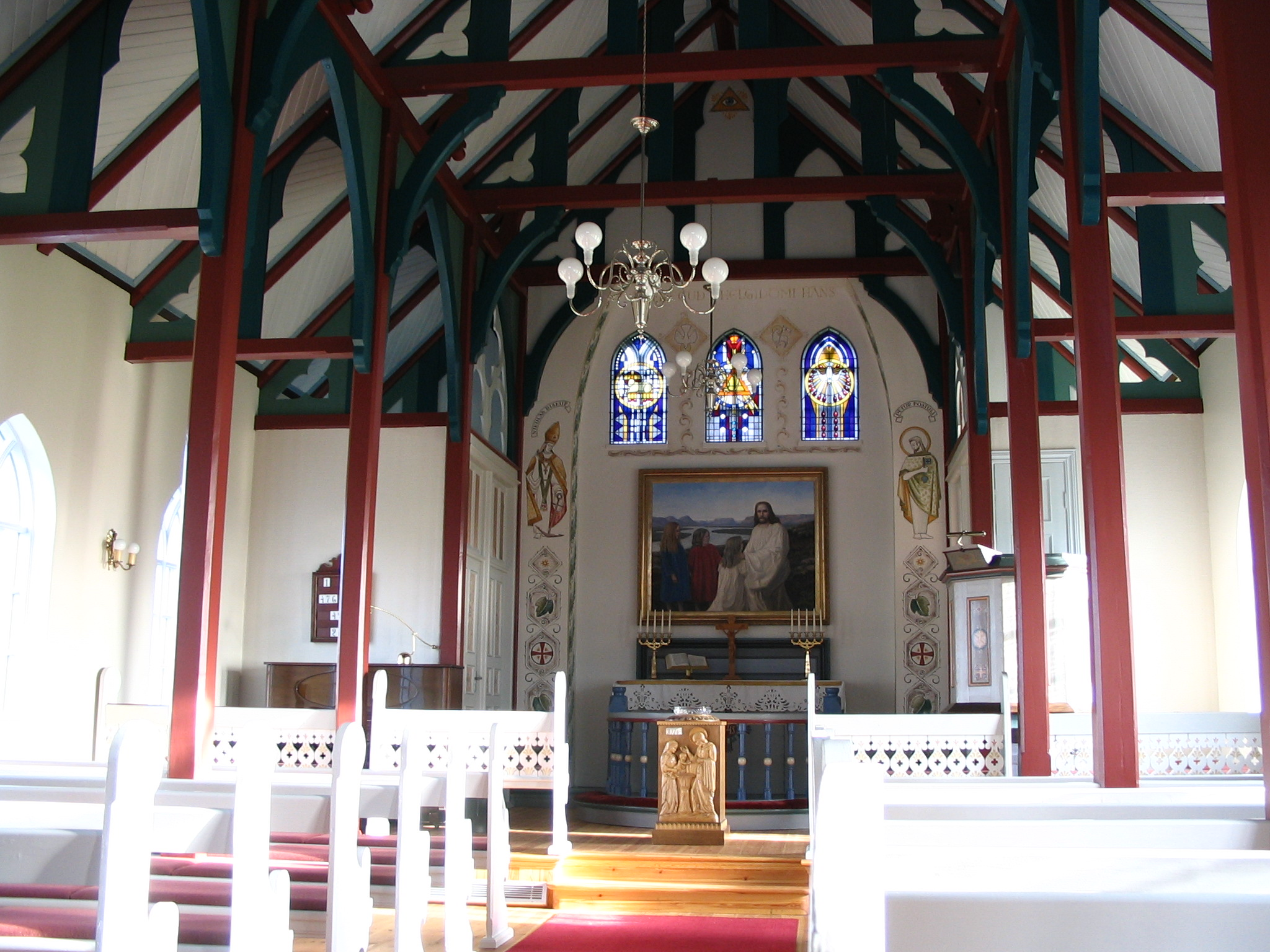
The church of Þingeyri, consecrated in 1911.

In 1995, the inhabitants of Þingeyri voted in favor of a merger with Ísafjörður, Suðureyri, Mýrahreppur, Mosvallahreppur and Flateyri to form the new municipality of Ísafjarðarbær. Of the six municipalities involved, Þingeyri had the lowest rate of approval for the merger with 130 voting in favor and 71 voting against.

The nearby mountain of Sandafell, accessed by driving or hiking, is a tourist destination known for its scenic view.

Þingeyri from the sea

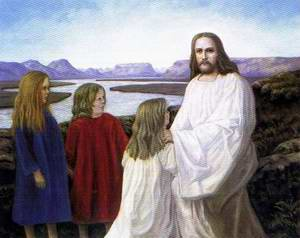
The altarpiece of the church was painted by Þórarinn B. Þorláksson. It shows Christ with three girls in an Icelandic landscape.

== Climate ==
Based on the climate data for the most recent reference period, Þingeyri has a subpolar oceanic climate (Köppen Cfc) or a continental subarctic climate (Köppen Dfc), depending on the isotherm used.

Climate data for Hólar í Dýrafirði, 3 km (1.9 mi) from Þingeyri (1991–2020)
Month	Jan	Feb	Mar	Apr	May	Jun	Jul	Aug	Sep	Oct	Nov	Dec	Year
Record high °C (°F)	11.0 (51.8)	10.2 (50.4)	13.8 (56.8)	17.2 (63.0)	19.5 (67.1)	22.4 (72.3)	26.0 (78.8)	24.4 (75.9)	20.2 (68.4)	17.5 (63.5)	13.6 (56.5)	12.1 (53.8)	26.0 (78.8)
Mean daily maximum °C (°F)	2.4 (36.3)	2.0 (35.6)	2.3 (36.1)	4.9 (40.8)	8.3 (46.9)	11.7 (53.1)	13.8 (56.8)	13.0 (55.4)	10.2 (50.4)	6.1 (43.0)	3.7 (38.7)	2.5 (36.5)	6.7 (44.1)
Daily mean °C (°F)	−0.1 (31.8)	−0.7 (30.7)	−0.5 (31.1)	2.0 (35.6)	5.5 (41.9)	8.8 (47.8)	10.9 (51.6)	10.0 (50.0)	7.4 (45.3)	3.5 (38.3)	1.1 (34.0)	0.0 (32.0)	4.0 (39.2)
Mean daily minimum °C (°F)	−3.0 (26.6)	−3.7 (25.3)	−3.2 (26.2)	−0.8 (30.6)	2.3 (36.1)	5.7 (42.3)	7.7 (45.9)	7.2 (45.0)	4.9 (40.8)	1.3 (34.3)	−1.6 (29.1)	−3.1 (26.4)	1.1 (34.1)
Record low °C (°F)	−17.5 (0.5)	−18.3 (−0.9)	−20.9 (−5.6)	−15.1 (4.8)	−7.4 (18.7)	−1.9 (28.6)	0.8 (33.4)	−1.6 (29.1)	−5.9 (21.4)	−8.8 (16.2)	−15.8 (3.6)	−19.2 (−2.6)	−20.9 (−5.6)
Average precipitation mm (inches)	171.3 (6.74)	146.4 (5.76)	138.7 (5.46)	77.4 (3.05)	72.5 (2.85)	35.3 (1.39)	41.6 (1.64)	55.3 (2.18)	126.6 (4.98)	106.8 (4.20)	129.6 (5.10)	169.1 (6.66)	1,270.6 (50.01)
Source: Icelandic Met Office
