= KK (musician) =

- Birth name: Kristján Kristjánsson
- Born: 26 March 1956 (age 69); Minnesota, United States
- Genres: Blues, folk
- Occupation(s): Musician, songwriter
- Instrument(s): Vocals, guitar
- Years active: 1985 present

Kristján Kristjánsson also known as KK (Icelandic: [kʰauː kʰauː]) is an Icelandic blues and folk musician.

== Early life and career ==
KK was born on 26 March 1956, in Minnesota, United States, to Icelandic parents but moved to Iceland with his family around the age of 10. He attended music school in Malmö, Sweden for four years and then played his way across Europe from 1985 until 1990, when he returned to Iceland. He has been nominated for the Gríma Prize twice and has been awarded the Icelandic Music Prize twice.

In 2007 he toured to Shanghai with Magnús Eiríksson ("Maggi") and Óttar Felix Hauksson in advance of the release of their next recording there and in Iceland. He returned to Shanghai in 2010, where he played with his band at Expo 2010, representing Iceland.

KK appeared as supporting character "Gunnar", an Icelandic musician that is the father of Tuppence Middleton's character, Riley Blue/Gunnarsdóttir, on the Netflix series Sense8.

== Personal life ==
The singer Ellen Kristjánsdóttir is KK's sister. He composed "I think of angels" and he and Ellen perform it in memory of their older sister, Inger, who died in a car crash in 1992. A video of them performing the song produced by the Icelandic Red Cross is used for Red Cross fundraising.

Traditionally, KK and Ellen perform Christmas music every year in Reykjavík.

== Discography ==
=== Singles ===
Solo

- 2012: "Frelsið" (ICE #1)

as KK & Magnús Eiríksson

- 2013: "Á sjó" (ICE #9)

=== Albums ===
==== Solo ====
- 1991: "Lucky One" (KK)
- 1995: "Gleðifólkið" (KK)
- 1997: "Heimaland" (KK)
- 2001: "Galfjaðrir" (KK)
- 2002: "Paradís" (KK)
- 2004: "Upphafið" (KK)
- 2006: "Blús" (12 Tonar)
- 2008: "Svona eru menn" (JPV)

==== KK Band ====
- 1992: "Bein leið"
- 1993: "Hotel Föroyar"

==== KK and Magnus ====
(at times, credited as KK og Magnus Eiríksson)

- 1996: "Ómissandi fólk"
- 1999: "Kóngur einn dag" (Japis)
- 2000: "Lifað og leikið" (Zonet)
- 2003: "22 Ferðalög" (Zonet)
- 2005: "Fleiri ferðalög" (Zonet)
- 2007: "Langferðalög" (Zonet)
- 2011: "Þrefaldur" (Zonet 044) (three-disc set including Ómissandi fólk, Kóngur einn dag, and Lifað og leikið.)
- 2013: "Úti á sjó"

==== KK and Ellen ====
- 2005: "Jólin eru að koma"
- 2011: "Jólin"

== Sources ==
- Einar Kárason. KK: þangað sem vindurinn blæs. Reykjavík: Almenna bókafélagið, 2002. ISBN 9979-2-1656-5 (biography)
