= 1995 Flateyri avalanche =

Avalanche in Iceland

- Date: 26 October 1995
- Location: Flateyri, Iceland
- Cause: Avalanche
- Deaths: 20
- Injuries: 25
- Property damage: 17 houses damaged or destroyed.

The 1995 Flateyri avalanche was an avalanche that struck the village of Flateyri in Iceland’s Westfjords on 26 October 1995, killing 20 people. It came 9 months after an avalanche in Súðavík killed 14 people. The disasters had a profound effect on the nation and sparked a massive buildup of avalanche dams to protect towns in danger zones.

The avalanche fell from Skollahvilft [ˈskɔtlaˌkʰvɪl̥t] at around 4:00 AM, and destroyed 17 houses. 45 people were in the houses hit by the avalanche, 21 managed to escape on their own and four were later rescued alive.

== See also ==
- 1995 Súðavík avalanche - Avalanche in January of the same year in Iceland
