= Álftafjörður =

Fjord in Westfjords, Iceland

Coordinates: 66.01°N 22.99°W

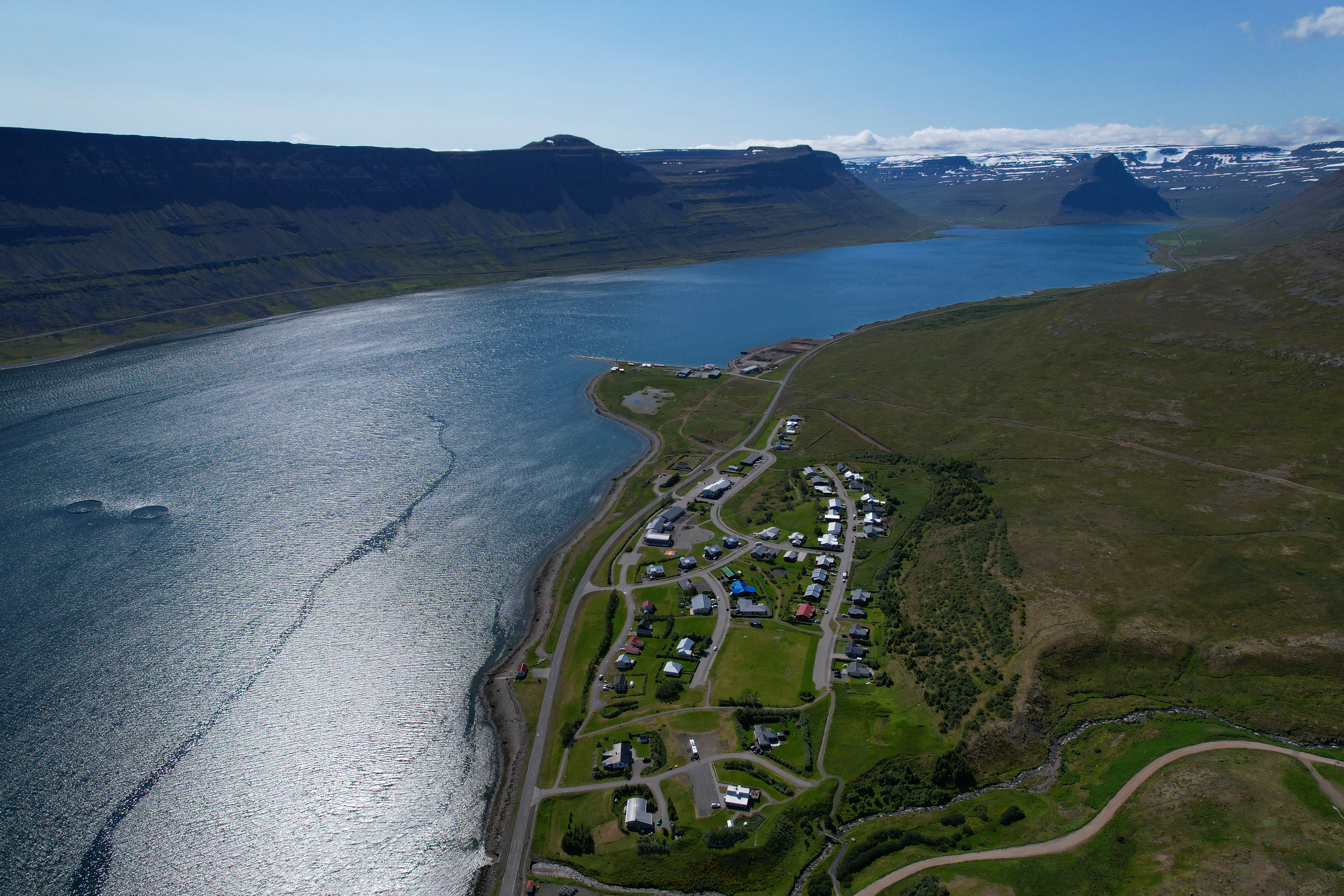
Álftafjörður (Westfjords) with the fishing village of Súðavík.

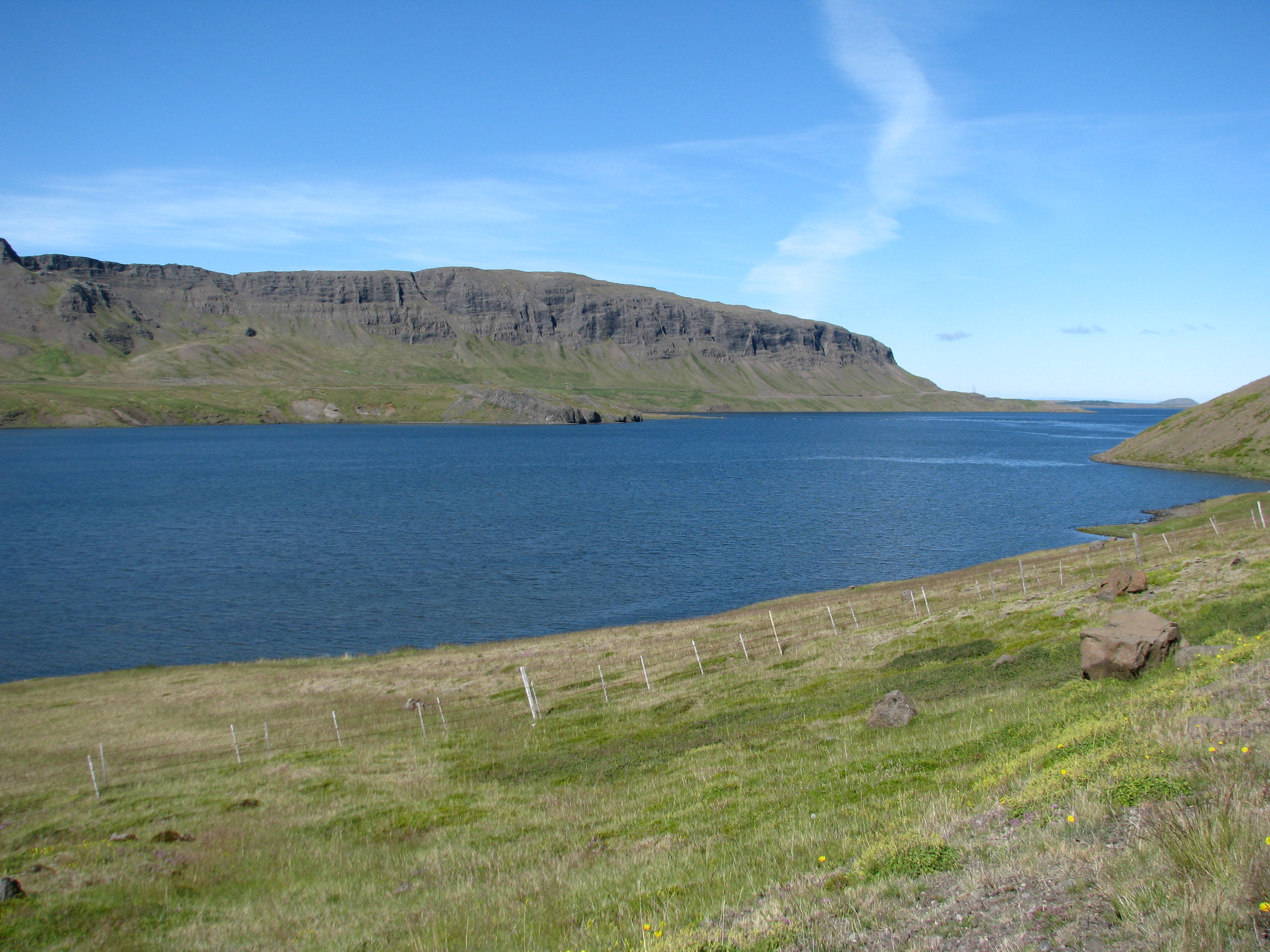
Álftafjörður (Snæfellsnes)

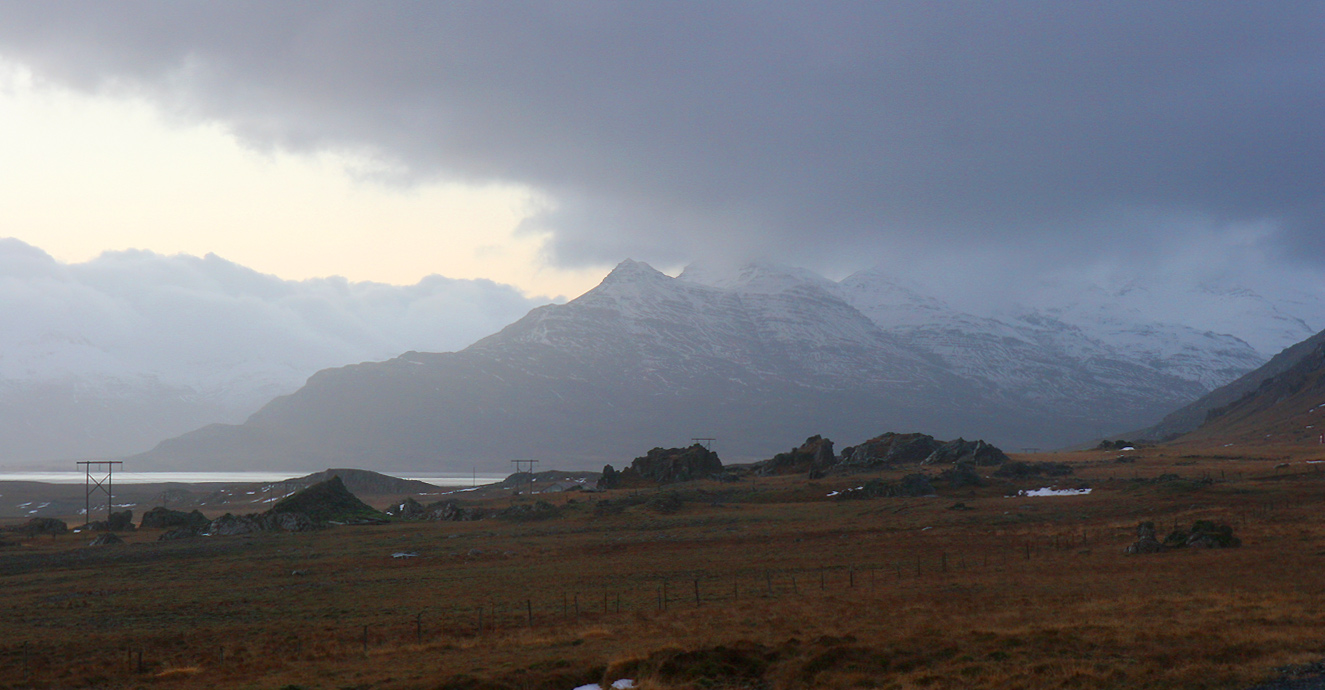
Álftafjörður (Eastfjords)

The name Álftafjörður (Icelandic pronunciation: [ˈaul̥taˌfjœrðʏr̥]) is Icelandic for "swan fjord", and there are some fjords by this name in Iceland. The best known of these are:

- Álftafjörður (Westfjords). This fjord is located on the southern side of Ísafjarðardjúp, in the Vestfirðir region of north-western Iceland. A whaling station was built in 1883 at Langeyri on its western shore by two Norwegians named Lars Mons and Svend Foyn, and was used until whaling was prohibited in Iceland in 1915. The modern village of Súðavík is in the same area.
- Álftafjörður (Snæfellsnes) is a southern branch of Breiðafjörður.
- Álftafjörður (Eastfjords) is a fjord of the East Fjords of Iceland between Höfn and Djúpivogur.

== Islands ==
- Brimilsnes
