= Brimilsnes =

Island in Iceland

Coordinates: 64°33′40″N 14°31′33″W

Brimilsnes is an island in Álftafjörður in the Eastfjords of Iceland. The island is part of the Múlaþing municipality.
