= Ísafjarðarbær =

- Municipality
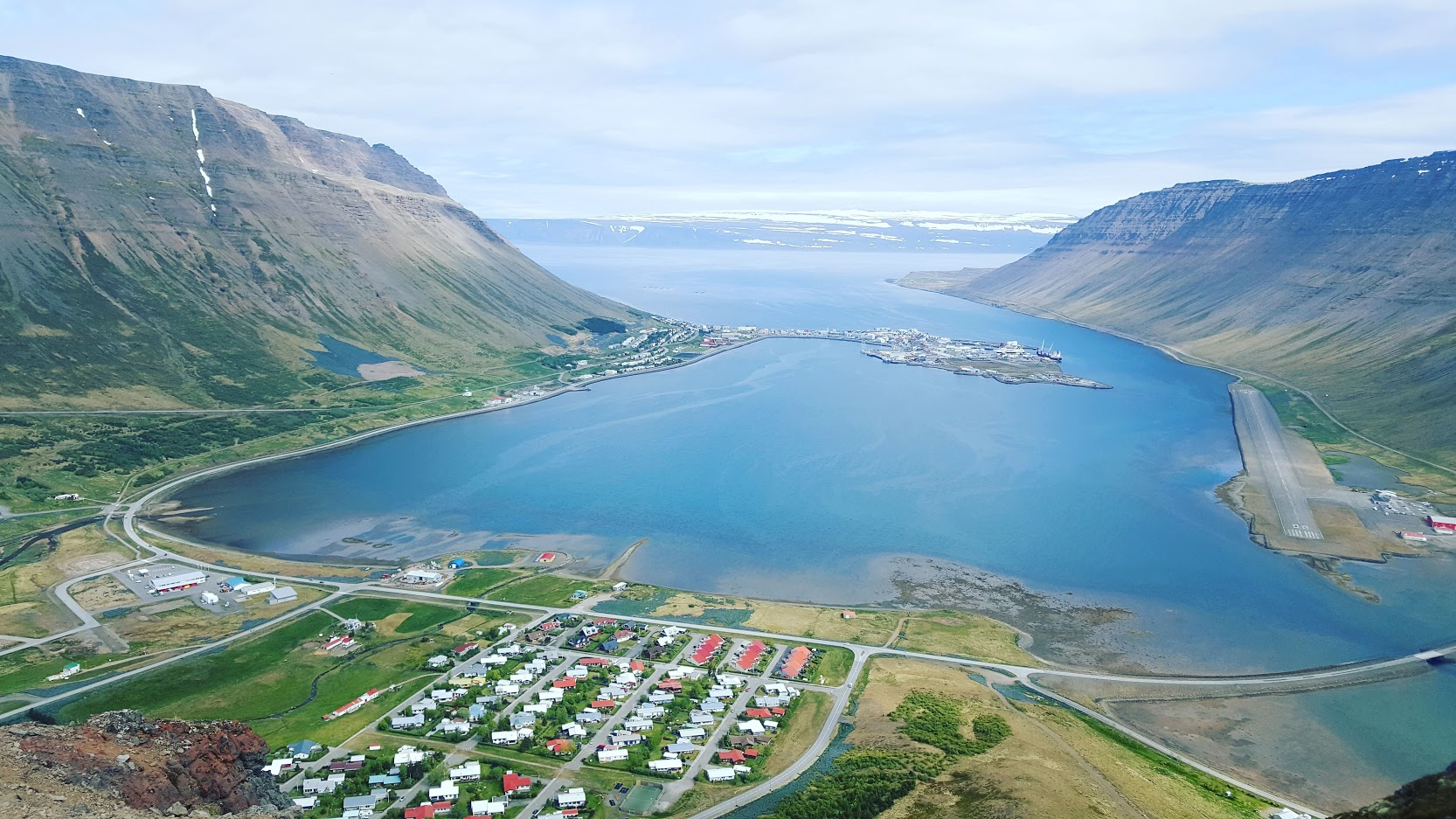
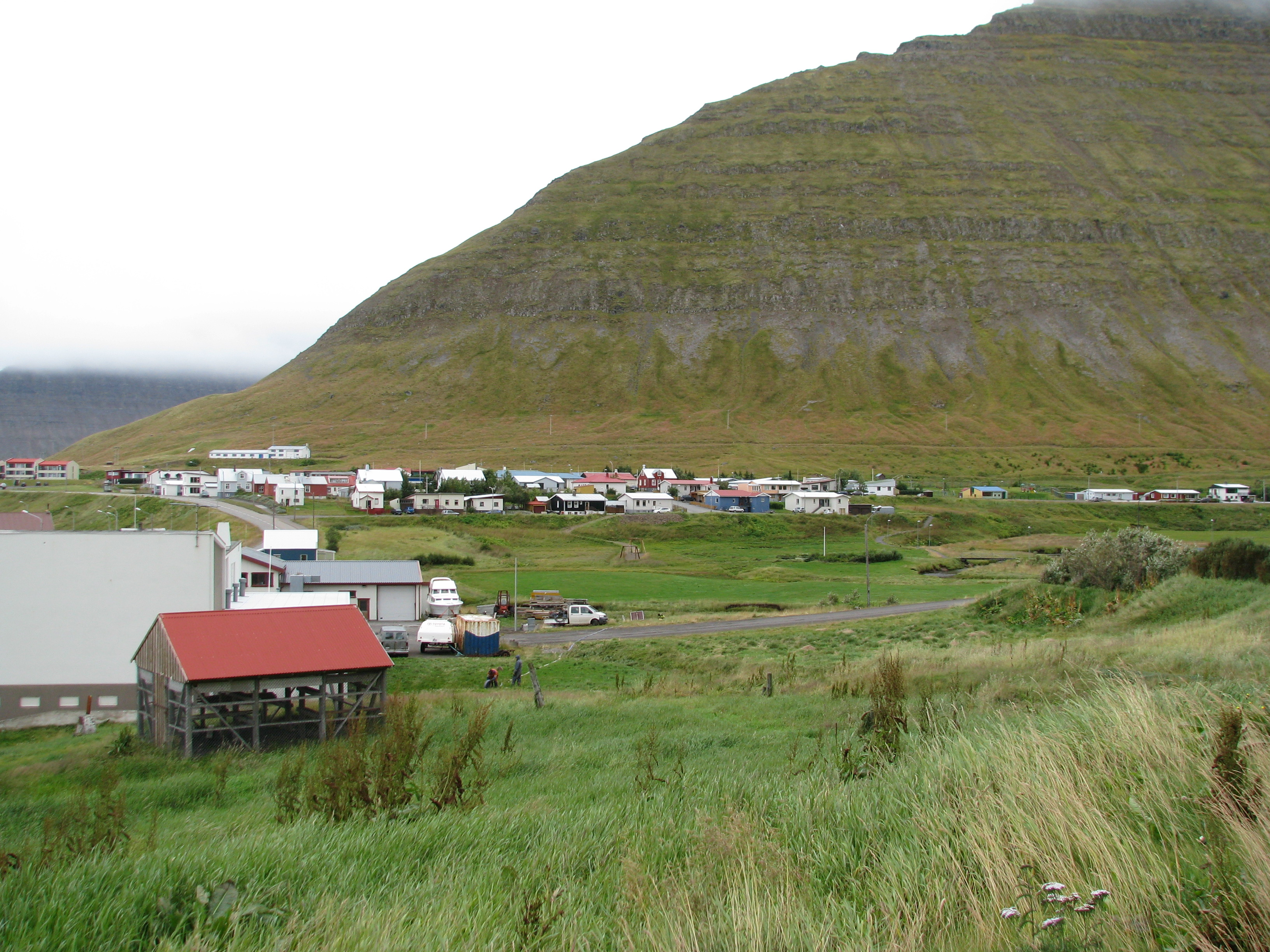
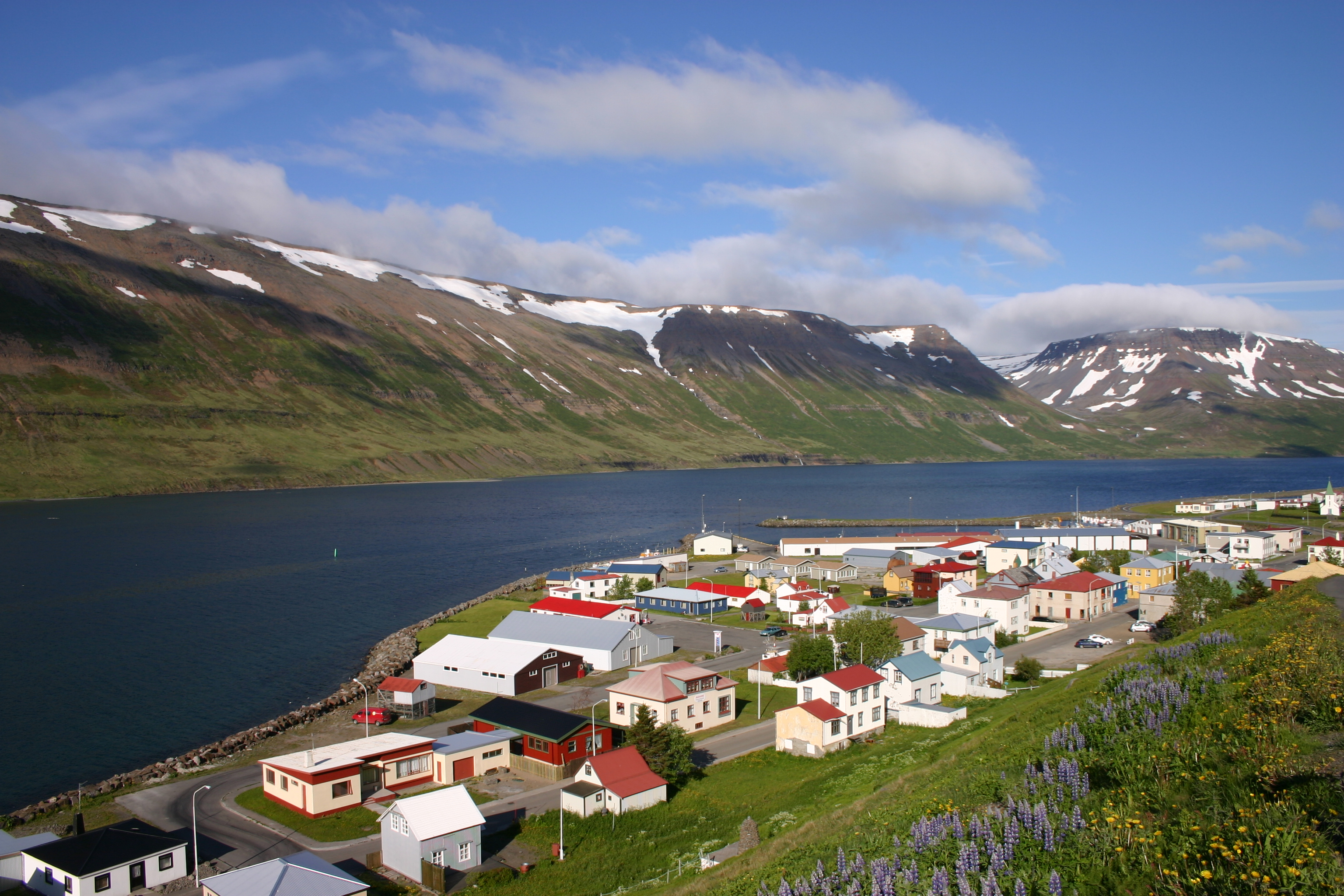
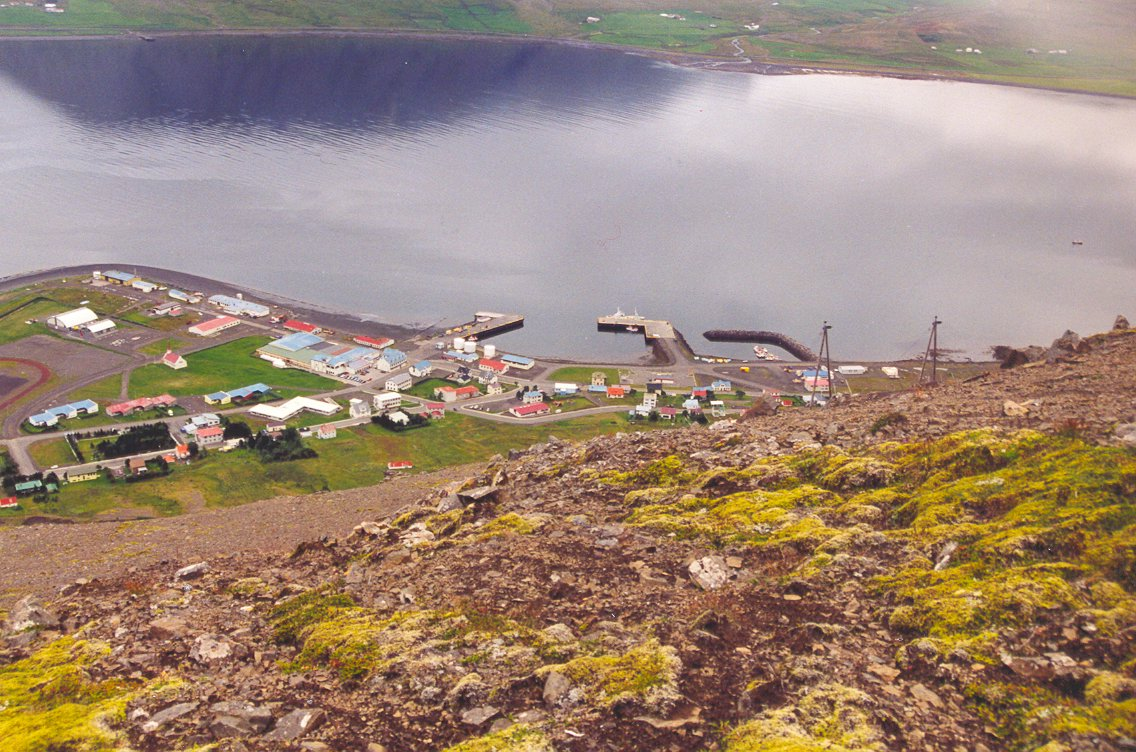
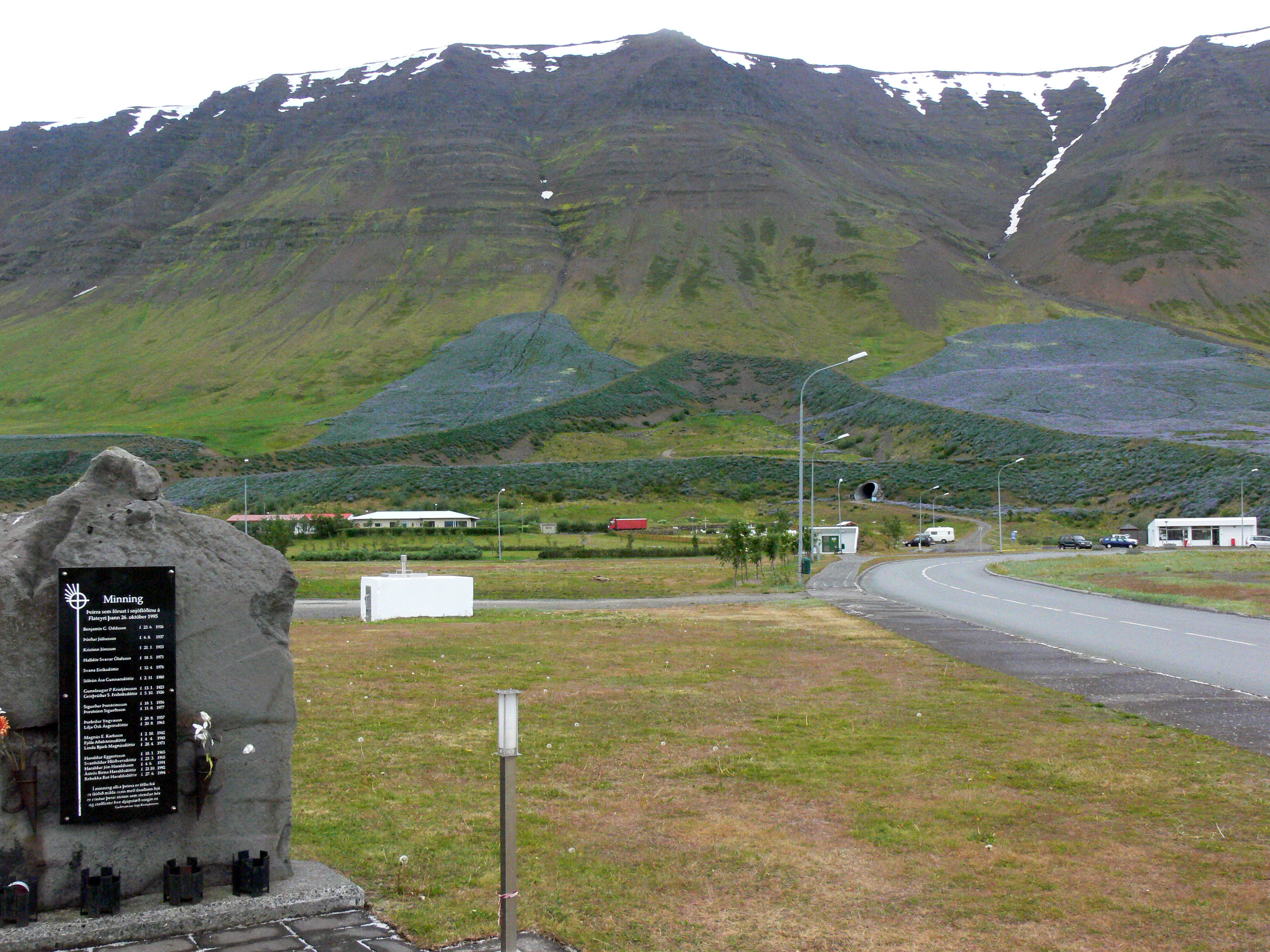
- Settlements of Ísafjarðarbær

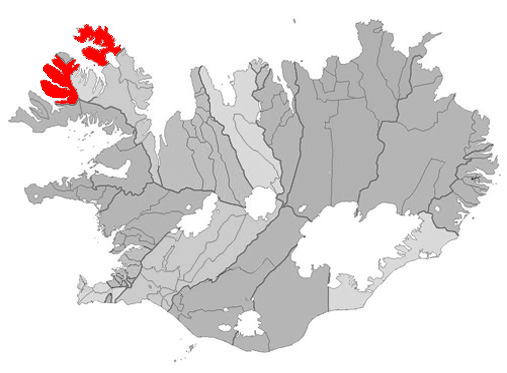
- Location of Ísafjarðarbær

- Location within Iceland
- Coordinates: 66°04′N 23°9′W
- Country: Iceland
- Region: Westfjords
- Constituency: Northwest Constituency

Government
  - Mayor: Sigríður Júlía Brynleifsdóttir

Area
  - Total: 2,379 km^{2} (919 sq mi)

Population (1 October 2025)
  - Total: 4,130
  - Density: 1.53/km^{2} (4.0/sq mi)
- Postal code(s): 400, 401, 410, 425, 430, 470, 471
- Municipal number: 4200
- Website: isafjordur.is

Ísafjarðarbær (Icelandic pronunciation: [ˈiːsaˌfjarðarˌpaiːr̥]) is a municipality of Iceland in the Westfjords region, created in 1996 from Flateyrarhreppur, Ísafjarðarkaupstaður, Mosvallahreppur, Mýrahreppur, Suðureyrarhreppur and Þingeyrarhreppur.

== Geography ==
The principal settlement is Ísafjörður, others being Hnífsdalur, Flateyri, Suðureyri and Þingeyri.

== Education ==
- University Centre of the Westfjords — a higher education institute in Ísafjörður
- Flateyri Folk High School — a folk high school in Flateyri
- Menntaskólinn á Ísafirði — a gymnasium in Ísafjörður

== Sports ==
Local football club Vestri plays in the country's second tier as of 2022. They play their home games at the Torfnesvöllur in Ísafjörður.

== Transport ==
The municipality is served by Ísafjörður Airport.

== Twin towns – sister cities ==
Ísafjarðarbær is twinned with:

- Joensuu, Finland
- Kaufering, Germany
- Linköping, Sweden
- Runavík, Faroe Islands
- Tønsberg, Norway

== Mayors ==
- Kristján Þór Júlíusson 1996–1997
- Jónas Ólafsson and Kristinn Jón Jónsson
- Halldór Halldórsson 1998–2010
- Daníel Jakobsson 2010–2014
- Gísli Halldór Halldórsson 2014–2018
- Guðmundur Gunnarsson 2018–2020
- Birgir Gunnarsson 2020–2022
- Arna Lára Jónsdóttir 2022–2025
- Sigríður Júlía Brynleifsdóttir 2025–present
