= The Arctic Fox Centre =

Research center in Iceland

Coordinates: 66.030417°N 22.990973°W

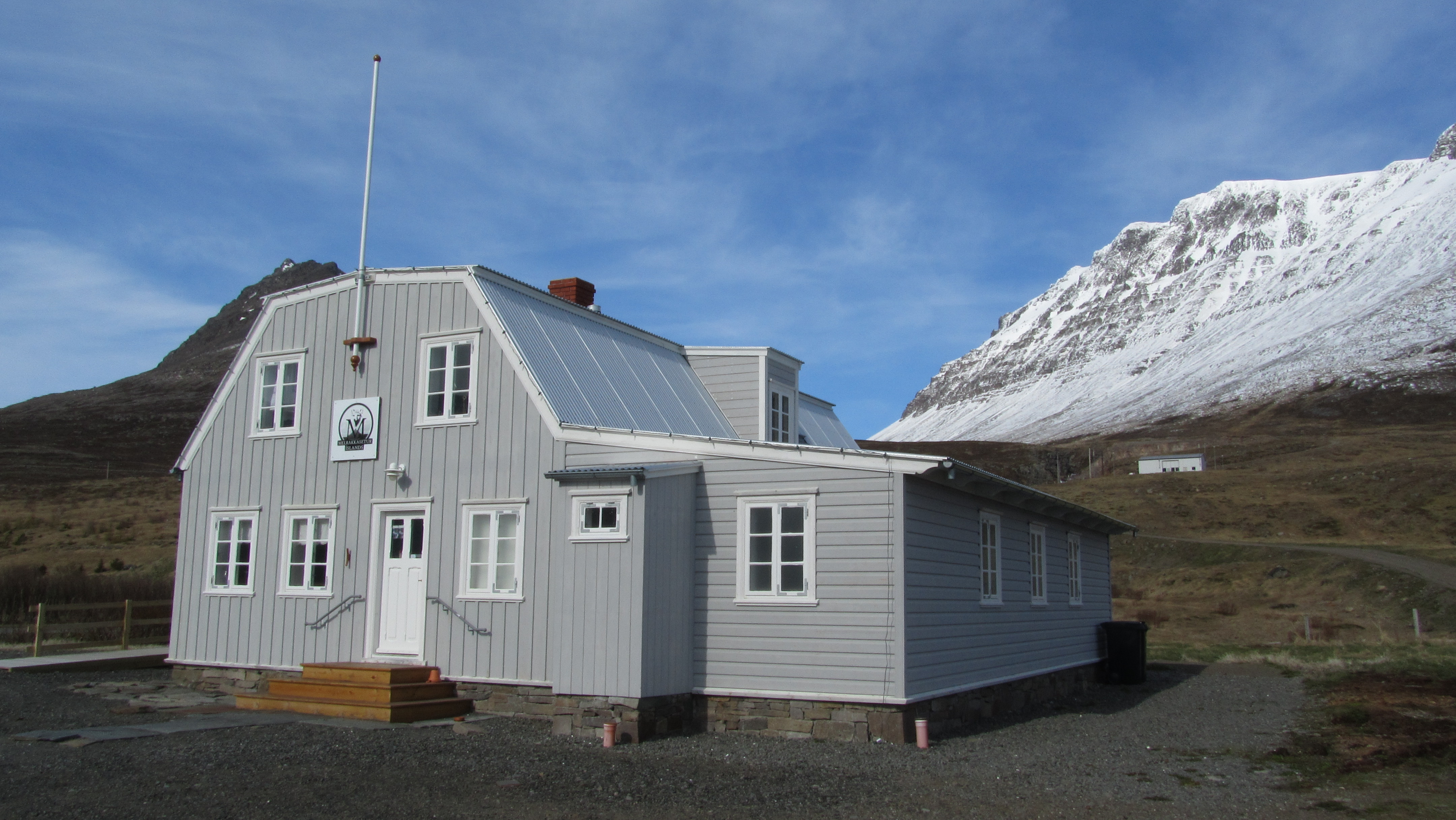
- The Arctic Fox Centre in Súðavík
- Other name: Melrakkasetur Íslands
- Founders: Páll Hersteinsson; Ester Rut Unnsteinsdóttir
- Established: 2007
- Focus: Arctic fox (Vulpes lagopus)
- Location: Súðavík, Iceland
- Website: melrakki.is

The Arctic Fox Centre (Icelandic: Melrakkasetur Íslands [ˈmɛlˌrahkaˌsɛːtʏr̥]) is a research centre with an enclosed exhibition and café in the municipality Súðavík in the Westfjords in Iceland. It focuses on the Arctic fox (Vulpes lagopus) which is the only native terrestrial mammal in Iceland. The centre was founded in 2007 by locals who are interested in the Arctic fox. It has a strong emphasis on ecotourism. The centre is a non-profit-partner of 1% for the planet and a member of The Wild North.

== The house ==
The house is located in the new part of Súðavík, on the land of the former farm Eyrardalur. It was built in the last decade of the 19th century and has been renovated recently by the authorities of Súðavík.

== History ==
Opened in 2010, the centre was founded by Páll Hersteinsson PhD and Ester Rut Unnsteinsdóttir MSc, Arctic fox experts as well as professor and pupil. Páll and Ester Rut originally started studying the Arctic fox together on the Hornstrandir Nature Reserve in 1998, one of the few areas in Iceland where the Arctic fox is protected from hunting, and wished to secure the continued study of the fox and to educate people on the facts of the Arctic fox, which in Iceland had a tarnished image and reputation. From this need grew the idea for the creation of the Arctic Fox Centre, a den for collecting and displaying information on Arctic foxes as well as creating a foundation for the research which they had begun in 1998.

After introducing the idea to a mixed reception in a tourism conference in the town of Ísafjörður in 2005 the researchers began receiving supporters and backers, and by 2007 the Arctic Fox Centre was officially created as a non profit organisation with 42 shareholders. The municipality of Súðavíkurhreppur had donated the oldest, but dilapidated house in the town of Súðavík to the project, and financed the complete restoration of the building. During this time Páll and Ester Rut raised funds, collecting Arctic fox material and knowledge for the exhibitions as well as continuing with their research. On the 10th of June 2010 the Arctic Fox Centre was officially opened.

Páll died in 2011. The Arctic Fox Centre maintains an exhibit of information, displays and videos of his work and through the creation of the Páll Hersteinnson Fund, which the Arctic Fox Centre uses to support Arctic fox research in Iceland.

== Exhibition ==
The museum consists of two parts. The first part deals with the biology and natural history of the Arctic fox including distribution, genetics, diet, details about their behaviour and the difference between 'white' and 'blue' morph Arctic foxes - the lesser known blue morph being especially significant to the region. The second deals with the social history of Iceland in relation to Arctic foxes, a complex history that reaches back over 1000 years. This part of the exhibition explores Iceland's fox-hunting tradition which continues to affect Iceland's relationship with the fox. Both the social and natural history parts of the museum give context to the scientific research conducted by the centre (and associates), of which there are also exhibits on display. The information is available in Icelandic, English, and German and informative tours are also often available.

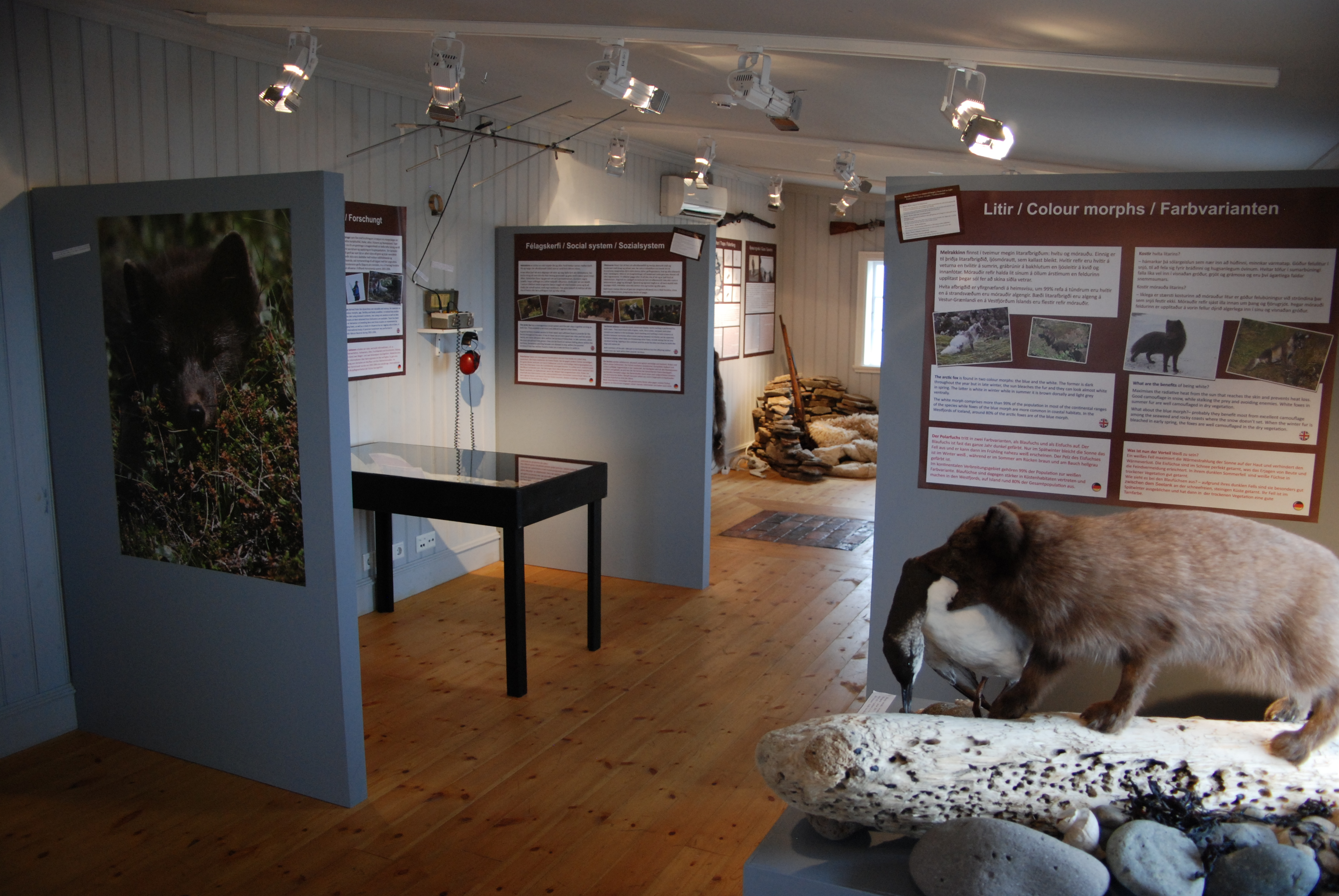
The museum of the Arctic Fox Centre
