= Súðavík =

Súðavíkurhreppur
- Municipality
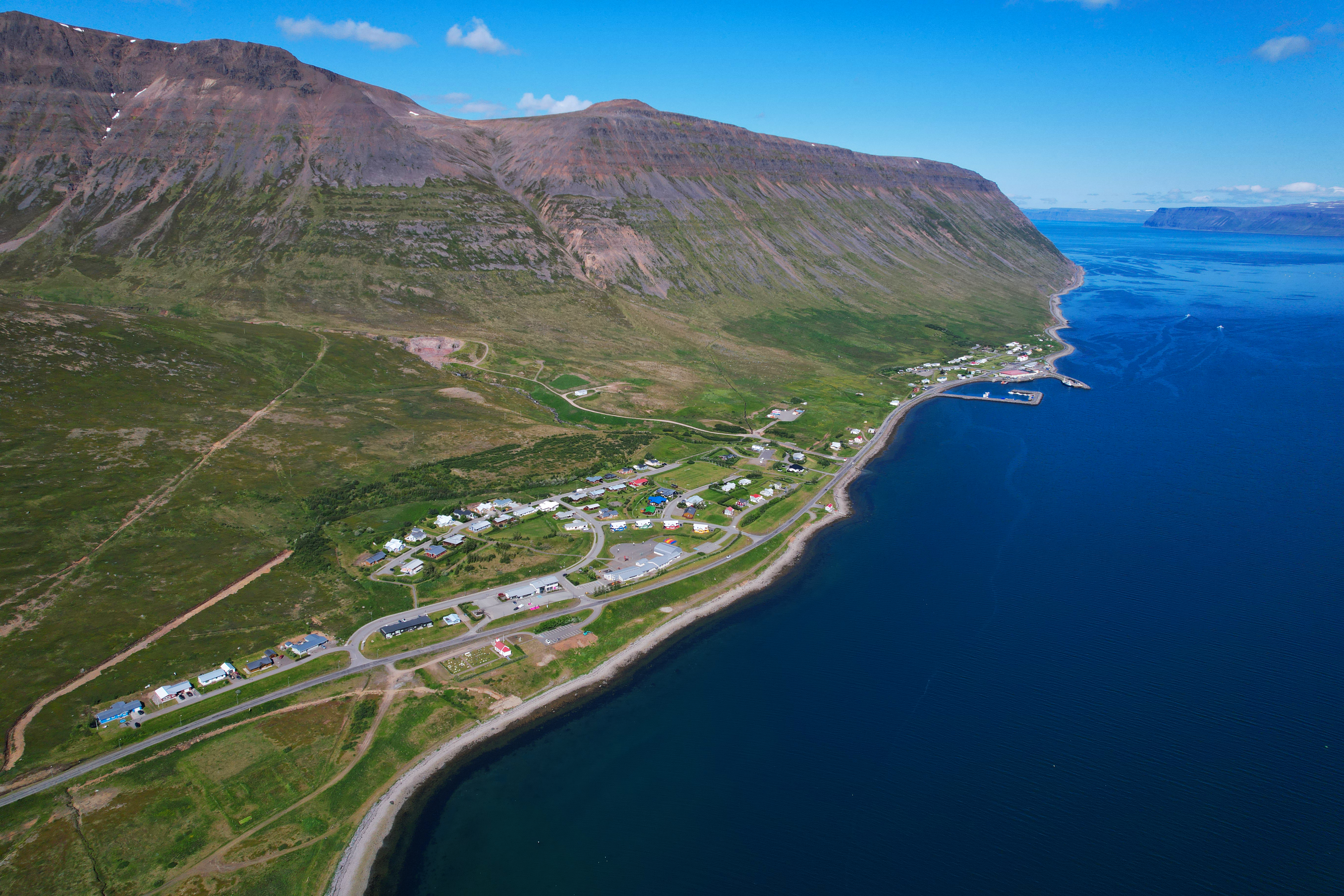
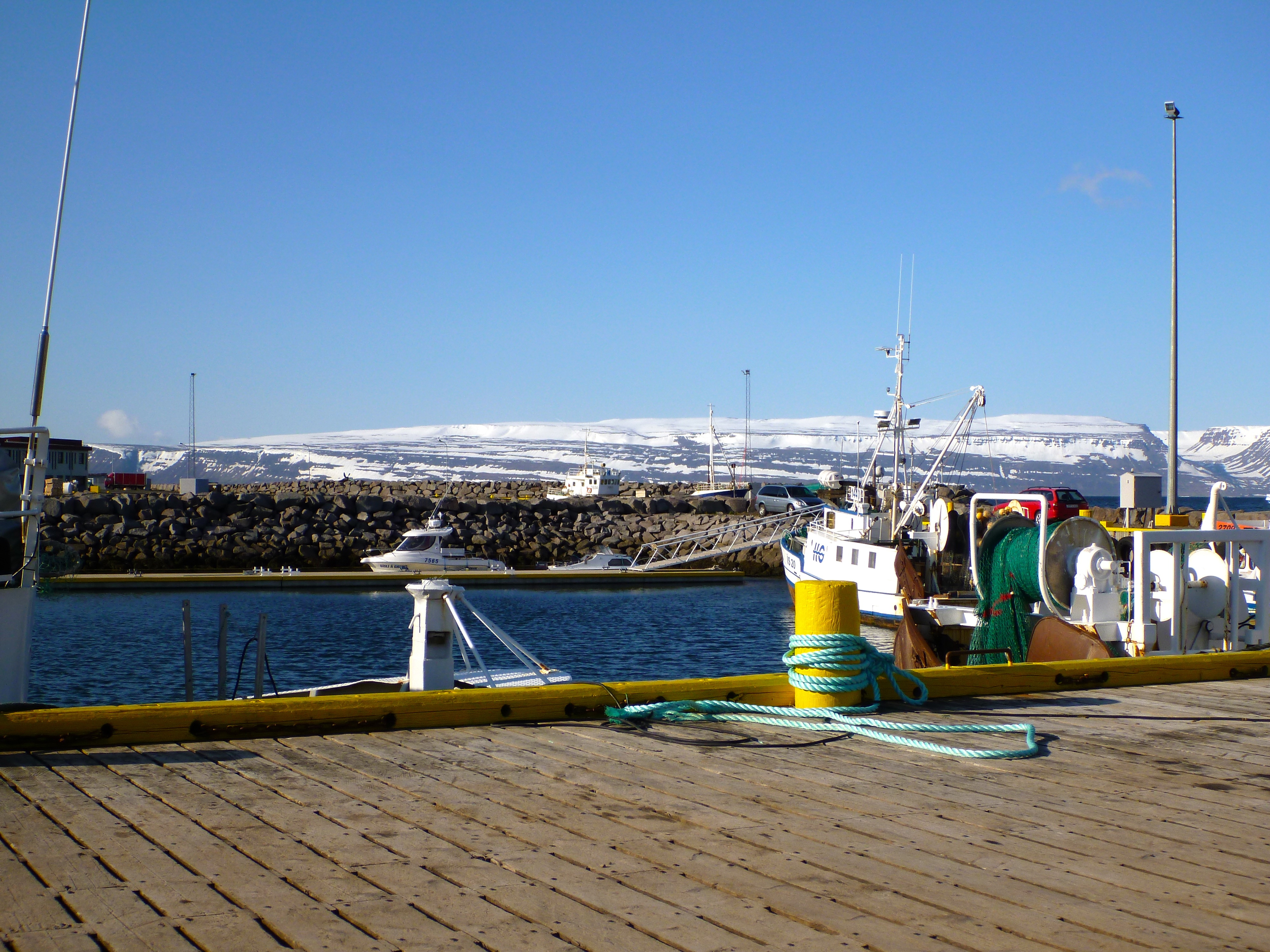
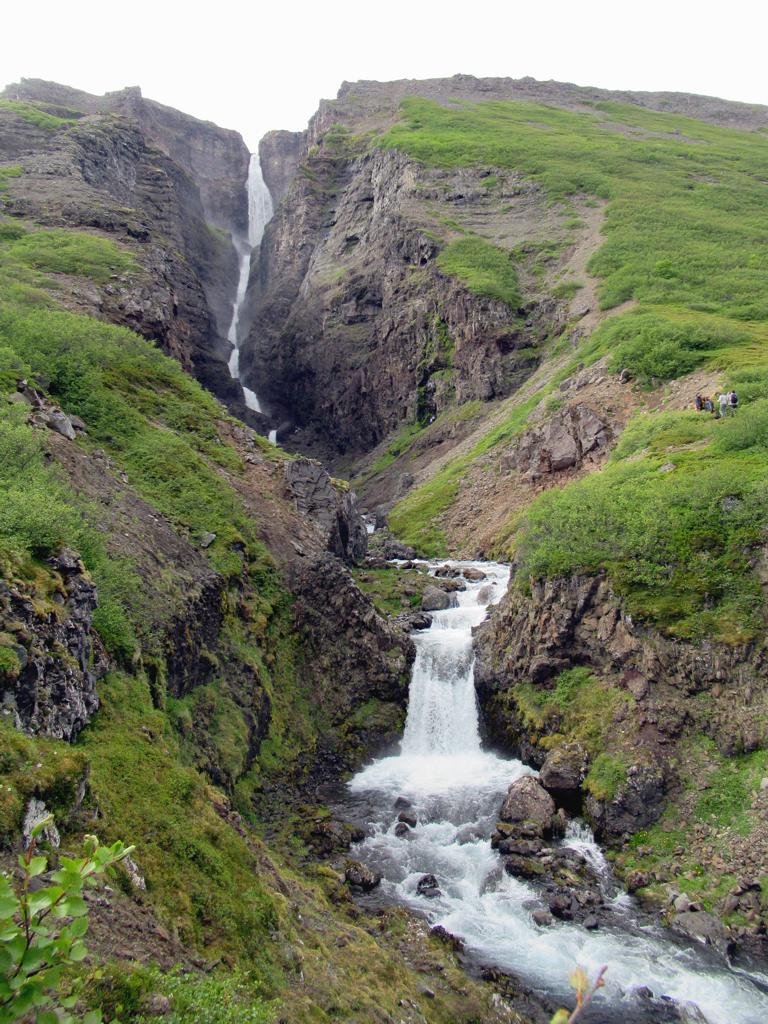
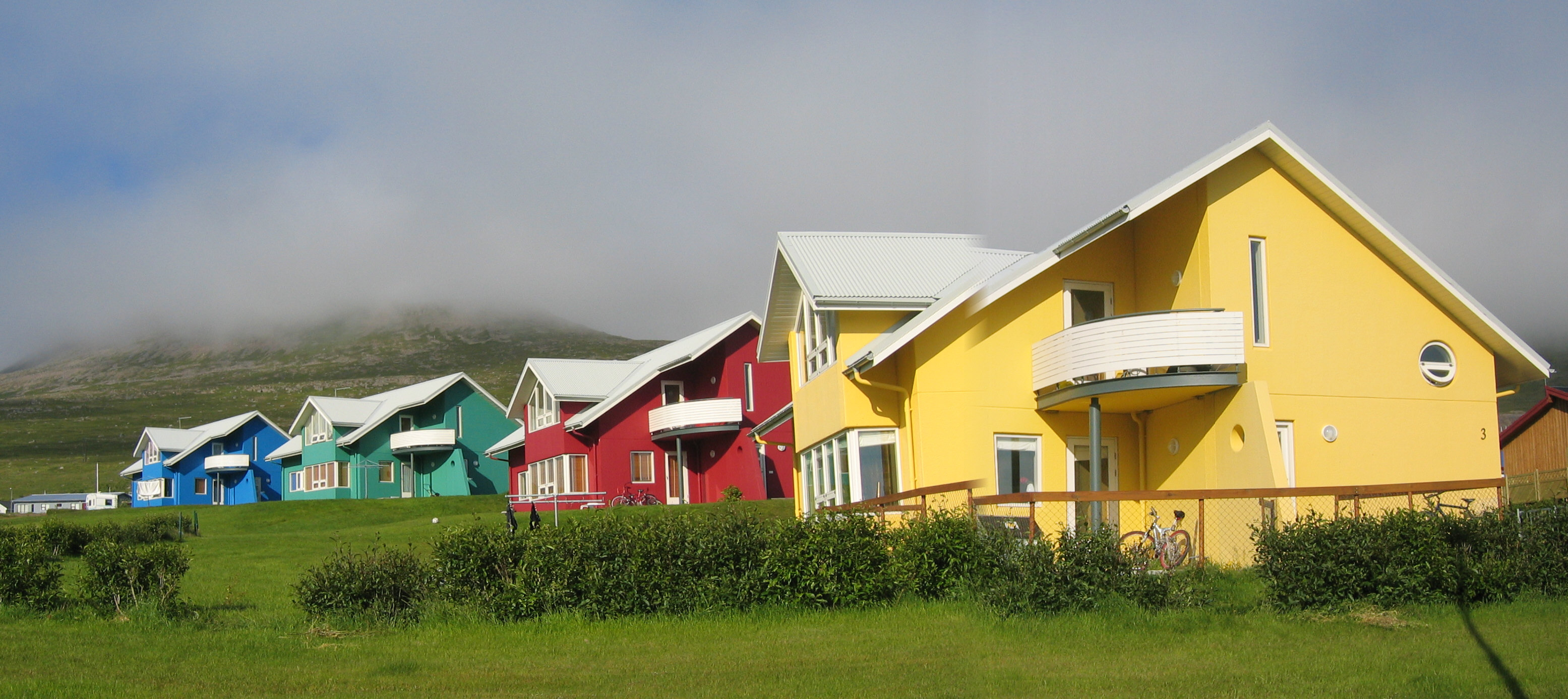
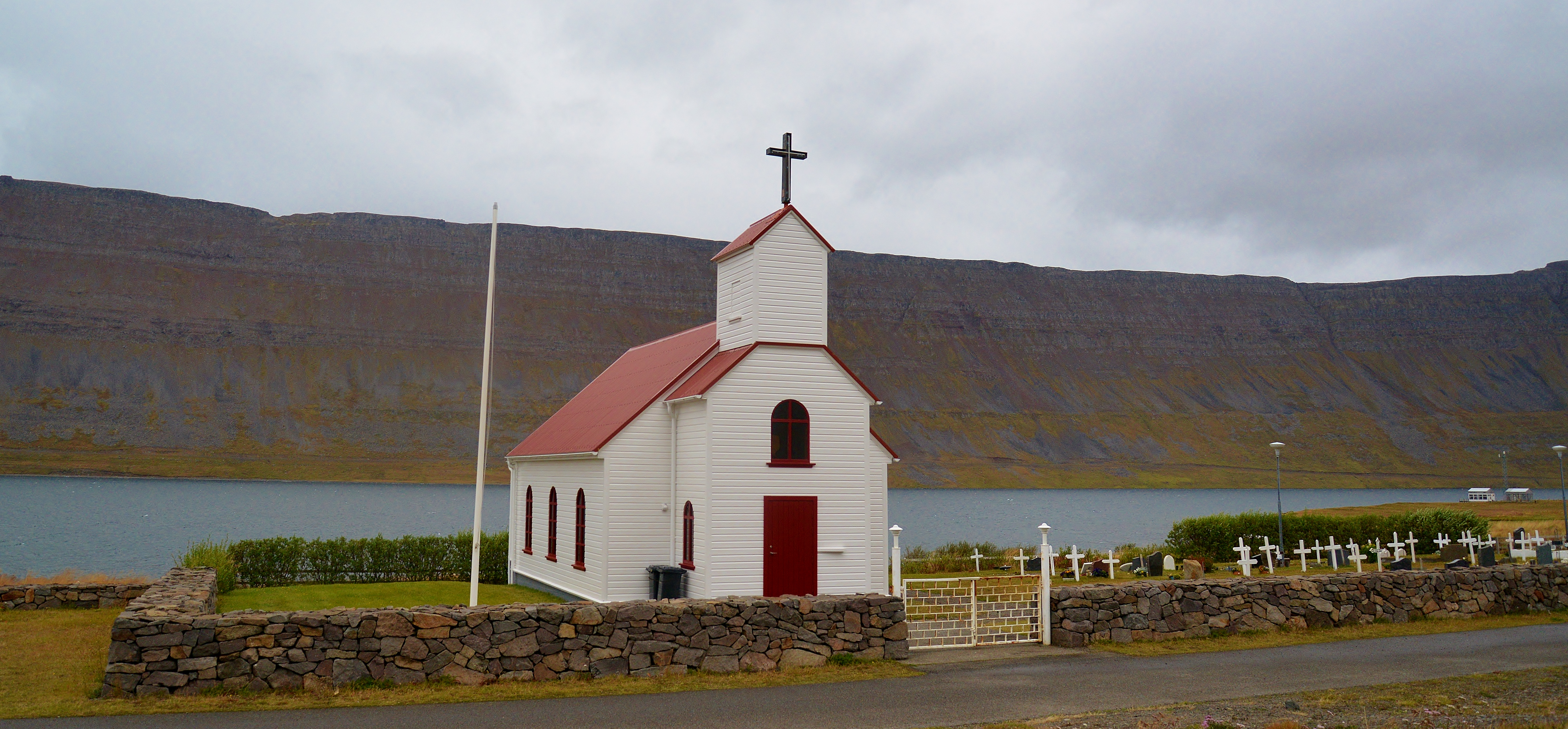
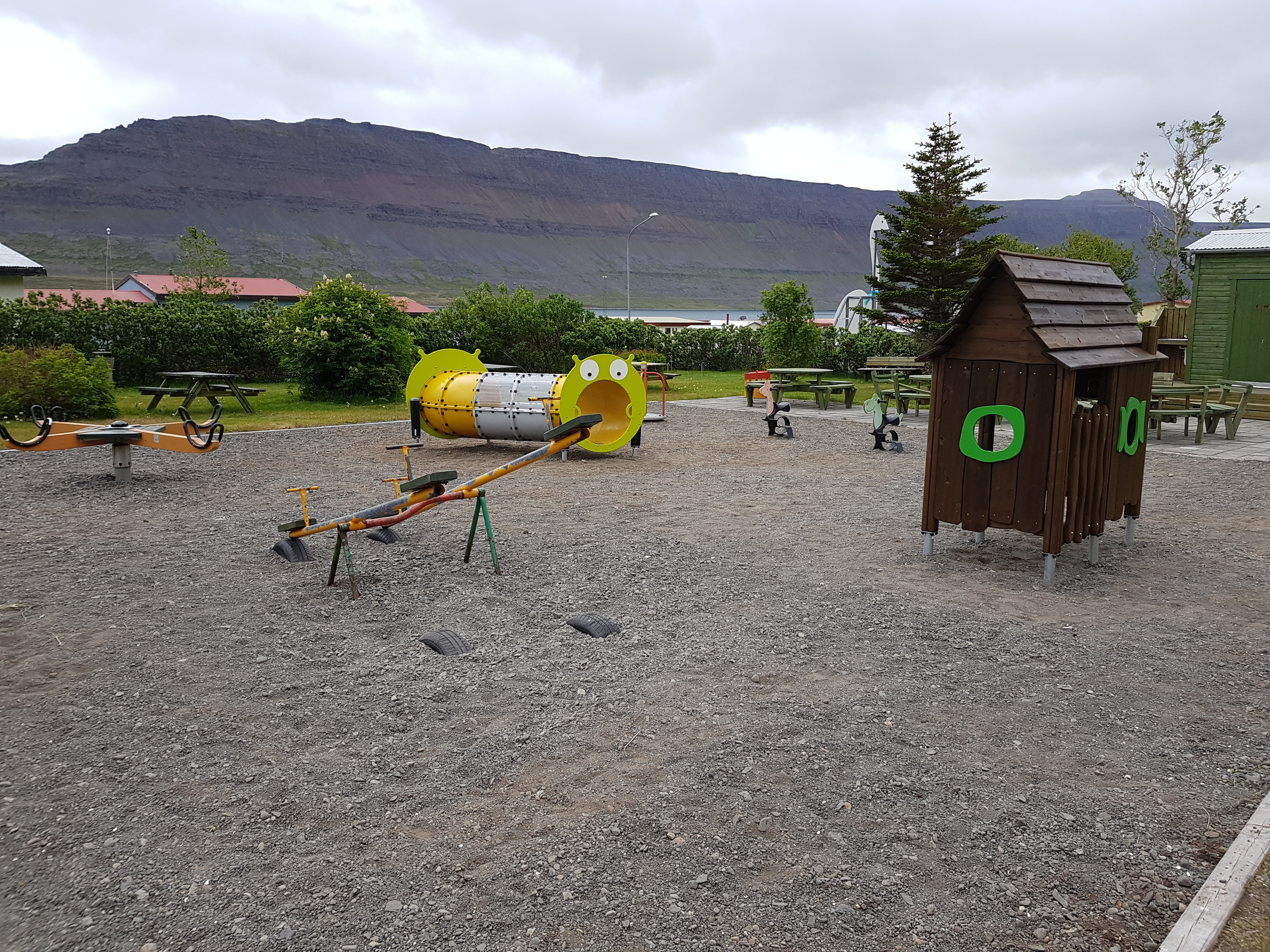
- Súðavíkurhreppur

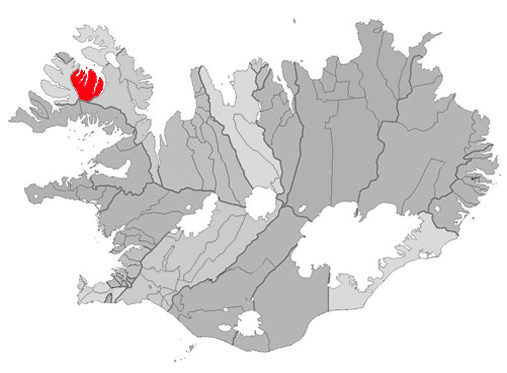
- Location of Súðavíkurhreppur

- Location within Iceland
- Coordinates: 66°01′40″N 22°59′30″W
- Country: Iceland
- Region: Westfjords
- Constituency: Northwest Constituency

Government
  - Mayor: Bragi Þór Thoroddsen

Area
  - Total: 749 km^{2} (289 sq mi)

Population (1 August 2024)
  - Total: 229
  - Density: 0.306/km^{2} (0.792/sq mi)
- Postal code(s): 420, 421
- Municipal number: 4803
- Website: sudavik.is

Súðavík (Icelandic pronunciation: [ˈsuːðaˌviːk]) is a fishing village and municipality (Súðavíkurhreppur [ˈsuːðaˌviːkʏr̥ˌr̥ɛhpʏr̥]) on the west coast of Álftafjörður in Westfjords, Iceland.

== History ==
On 16 January 1995 an avalanche fell on the village early in the morning (around 6:25 am) and destroyed several buildings, most of them residents' houses. Fourteen people were killed (including eight children) and twelve were injured including one girl that was under the snow for 12 hours . Severe snow storms made the rescue work difficult and dangerous. The final survivor was rescued 23 hours after the avalanche had fallen, and the search continued into the evening of 17 January. A disaster relief fund was established, and within a week, the Icelandic public had donated 300 million kroner (about $3,000,000) to the relief effort.

The same winter, two more avalanches fell from Traðargil [ˈtʰraːðarˌcɪːl̥], destroying several houses; the areas hit had already been evacuated, so no more people died. Avalanches fell from many other gullies and mountainsides during the avalanche cycle that winter.

At a public meeting on 23 January 1995 it was decided that the village should be rebuilt at a safer location. The existing properties within the danger zone were sold to the Icelandic government, and construction work on the new village began on 23 August. By winter of 1996–1997, 51 new houses had been built, and eight more had been moved from the old residential area. The industries in the area were relocated along with the residents, with the exception of the freezing plant, which continues to operate in a similar manner as it did prior to the avalanche. Many of the properties in the old town are now rented out to tourists in the summer months.

The village's main industries now are fishing, fish processing and tourism.

== Tourism ==
As well as the old town's summerhouses, there are several tourist industries operating in Súðavík, such as a sea angling company (Iceland Sea Angling) and a tour guide business. The town is also home to the Arctic Fox Center, a museum and research center devoted to the Arctic fox.
