= Flateyri Folk High School =

Coordinates: 66.0483°N 23.5123°W

Flateyri Folk School
- Lýðskólinn á Flateyri
- Flateyri; Iceland

Information
- Type: Folk high school
- Established: 11 February 2017
- Director: Katrín María Gísladóttir
- Colors: Red, Blue
- Website: www.lydflat.is

Lýðskólinn á Flateyri (English: The Flateyri Folk School) is a folk high school in Flateyri, Iceland.

== History ==
Work on plans for the school started in 2016 and the organization was formally established on 11 February 2017. In January 2018, Helena Jónsdóttir was hired as the schools first director.

The school opened in September 2018 and was the second of its kind in Iceland. In February 2019, Ingibjörg Guðmundsdóttir was hired to replace Helena as the schools new director from 15 June 2019.

In May 2021, Katrín María Gísladóttir was hired as the schools new director.

In 2021, the school announced the building of a new campus that would be the first new houses built in Flateyri since 1997.

== Administration ==
Ingibjörg Guðmundsdóttir is the current director of Lýðskólinn á Flateyri, succeeding Helena Jónsdóttir in June 2019.

== Student Accommodation ==
The school operates both a dormitory and cabins in Flateyri for student housing.
