= Þórarinn B. Þorláksson =

Icelandic painter

- Born: 14 February 1867
- Died: 10 July 1924 (aged 57)

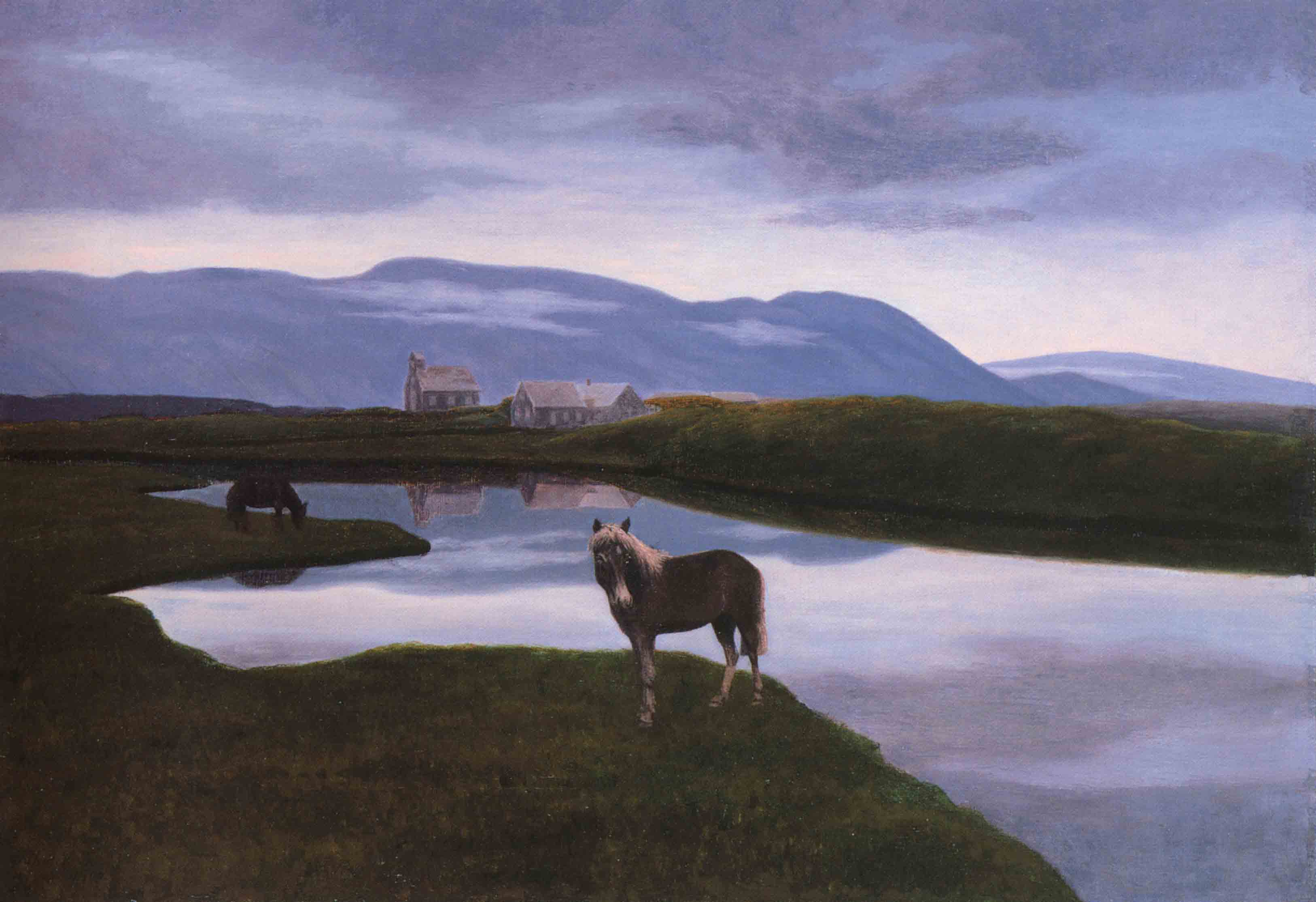
Þingvellir

Þórarinn Benedikt Þorláksson (February 14, 1867 – July 10, 1924) was one of Iceland's first contemporary painters, the first Icelander to exhibit paintings in Iceland, and recipient of the first public grant that country made to a painter.

== Early life and career ==
Þórarinn was born in 1867, the 13th of 14 children of a clergyman father, who died when Þórarinn was just five years old. Originally trained and working as a bookbinder, Þórarinn studied painting under a Copenhagen-trained Icelandic woman, Thóra Thoroddsen. In 1900 he was awarded a grant by the Icelandic Parliament to study art in Denmark, and he trained there from 1895 to 1899. Returning to Iceland, he held an exhibition of his works at a place perplexingly called Glasgow, in Reykjavík, in the summer of 1900—the first exhibition of Icelandic painting in Iceland. Þórarinn's principal interest was landscape painting, and a dominant subject in this first exhibition of works was Þingvellir, a site of historical significance to Icelanders as the site of their parliaments (which dated back to 930 AD).

== Later career ==
Þórarinn Þorláksson (left) with other members of the Icelandic Flag Committee, 1913

Þórarinn continued to paint, holding regular exhibitions until 1911. However, he required a regular income that could not be derived solely from his art. On December 30, 1913, he was appointed by Prime Minister Hannes Hafstein as one of the five people on the committee that designed the Flag of Iceland. He taught drawing at the Technical College and other institutions in Reykjavík, and was principal of that college from 1916 to 1922. He also ran a shop selling art materials, journals and books until his death. Throughout his life he continued to paint, particularly in the countryside during the summers, and it was at his own summerhouse, Birkihlíð, that he died on July 10, 1924.

== Selected paintings ==
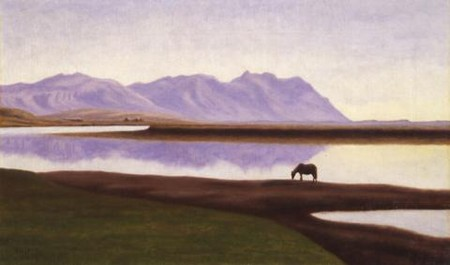
Hvítá in Borgarfjörður, 1903

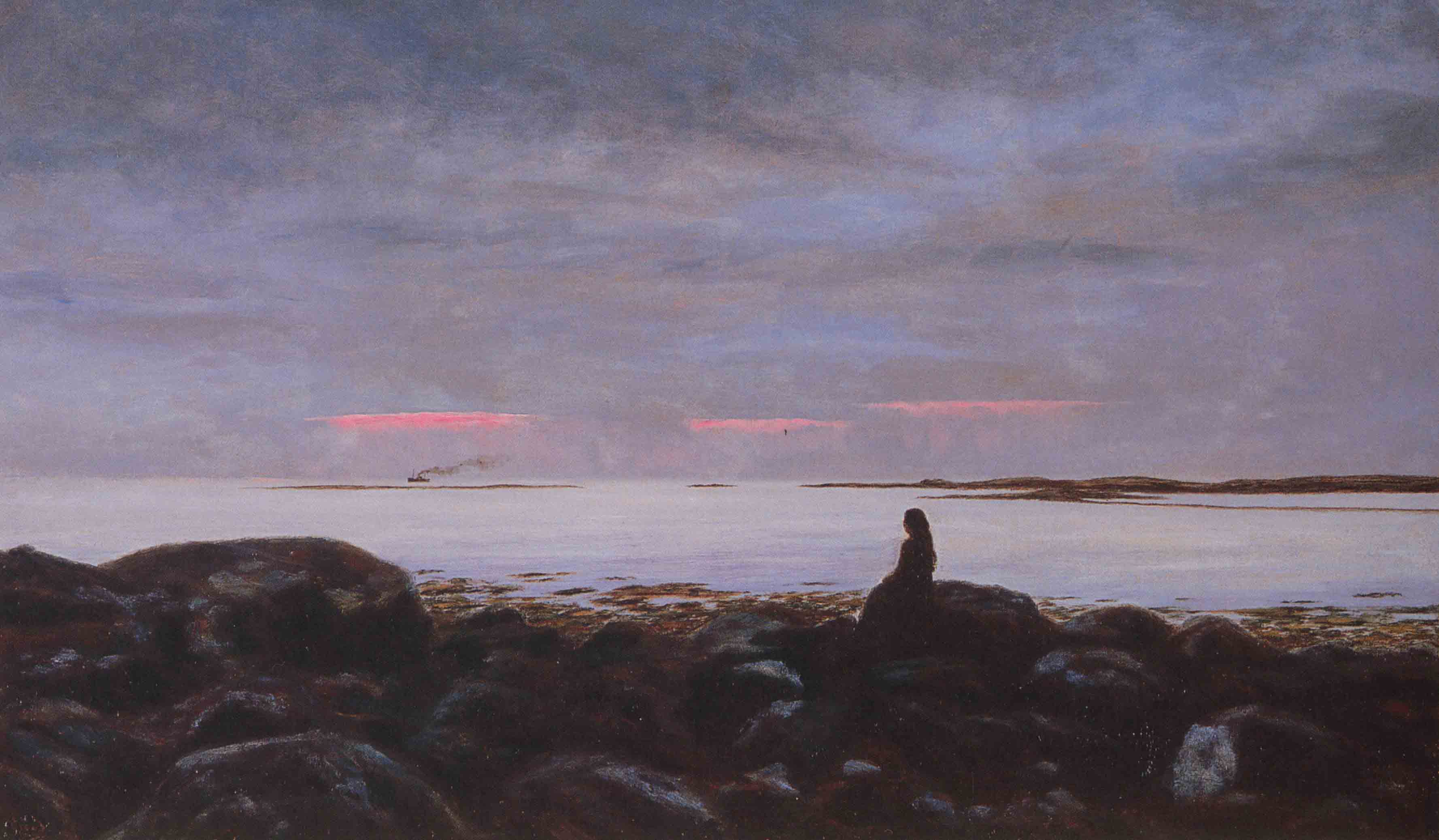
Summer Evening in Reykjavík, 1904

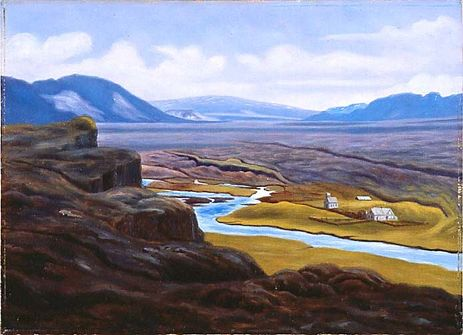
From Þingvellir II, 1905

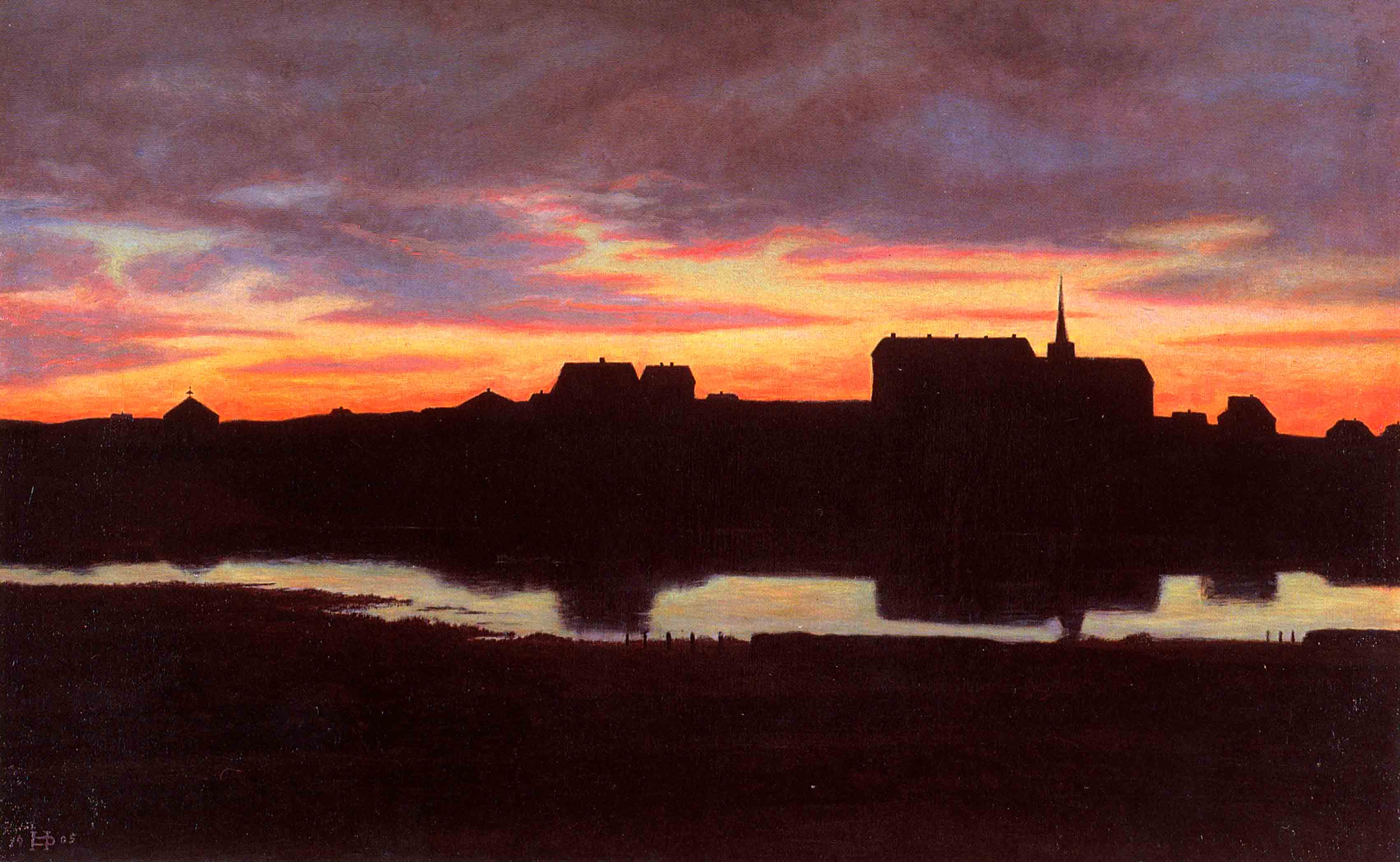
Sunset by Tjörnin, 1905

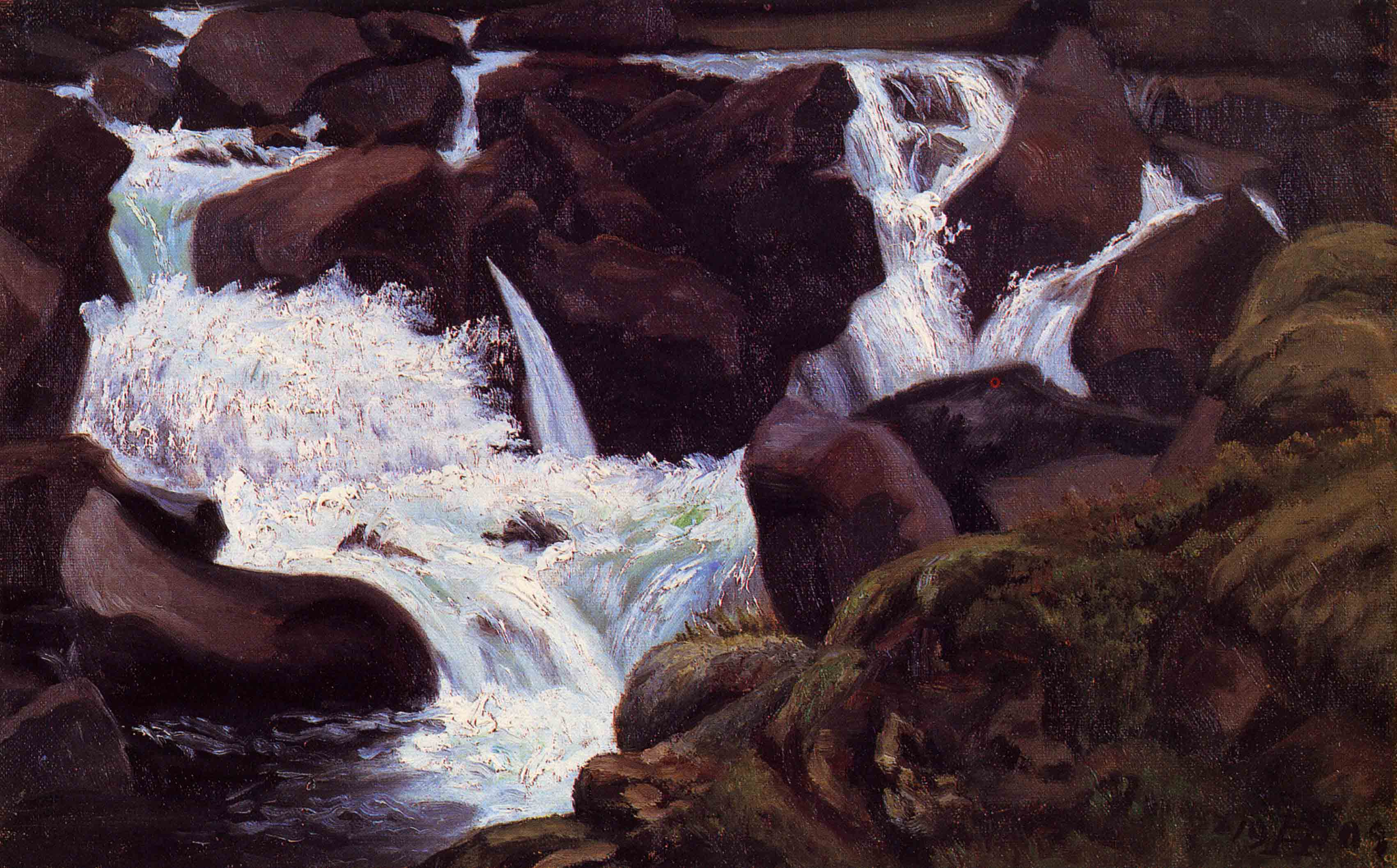
Waterfall, 1909

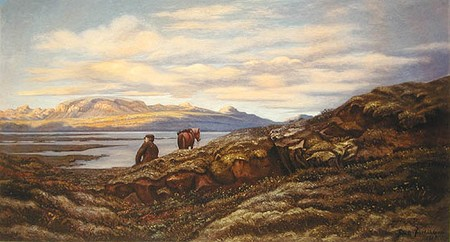
Repose, 1910

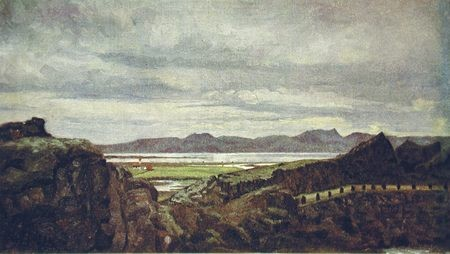
From Þingvellir, 1914

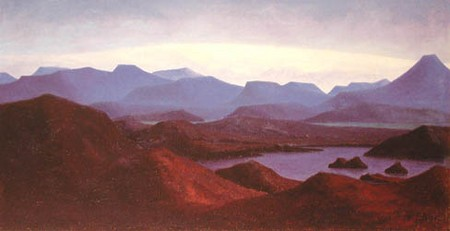
Stórisjór and Vatnajökull, 1921

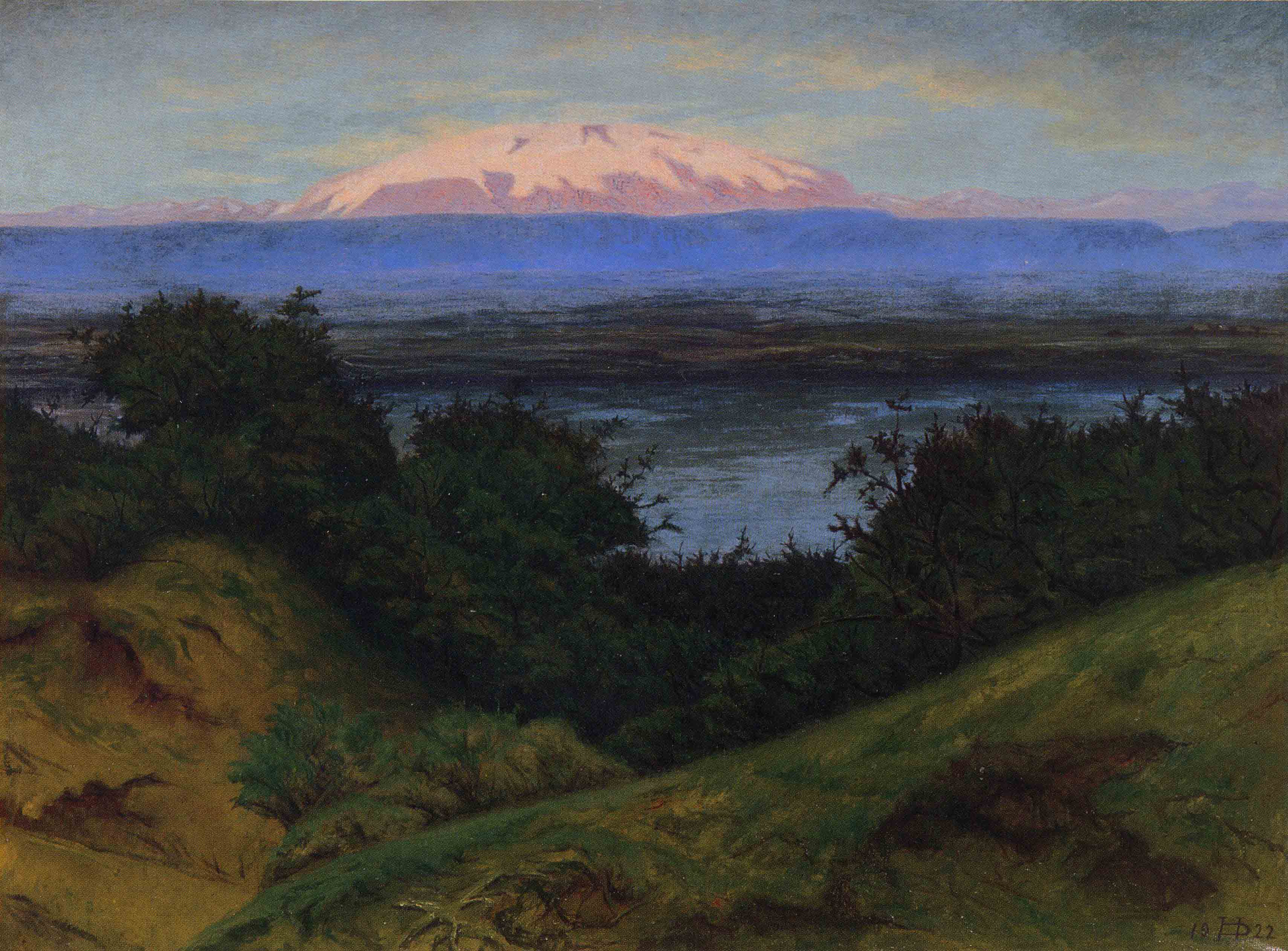
Hekla from Laugardalur, 1922

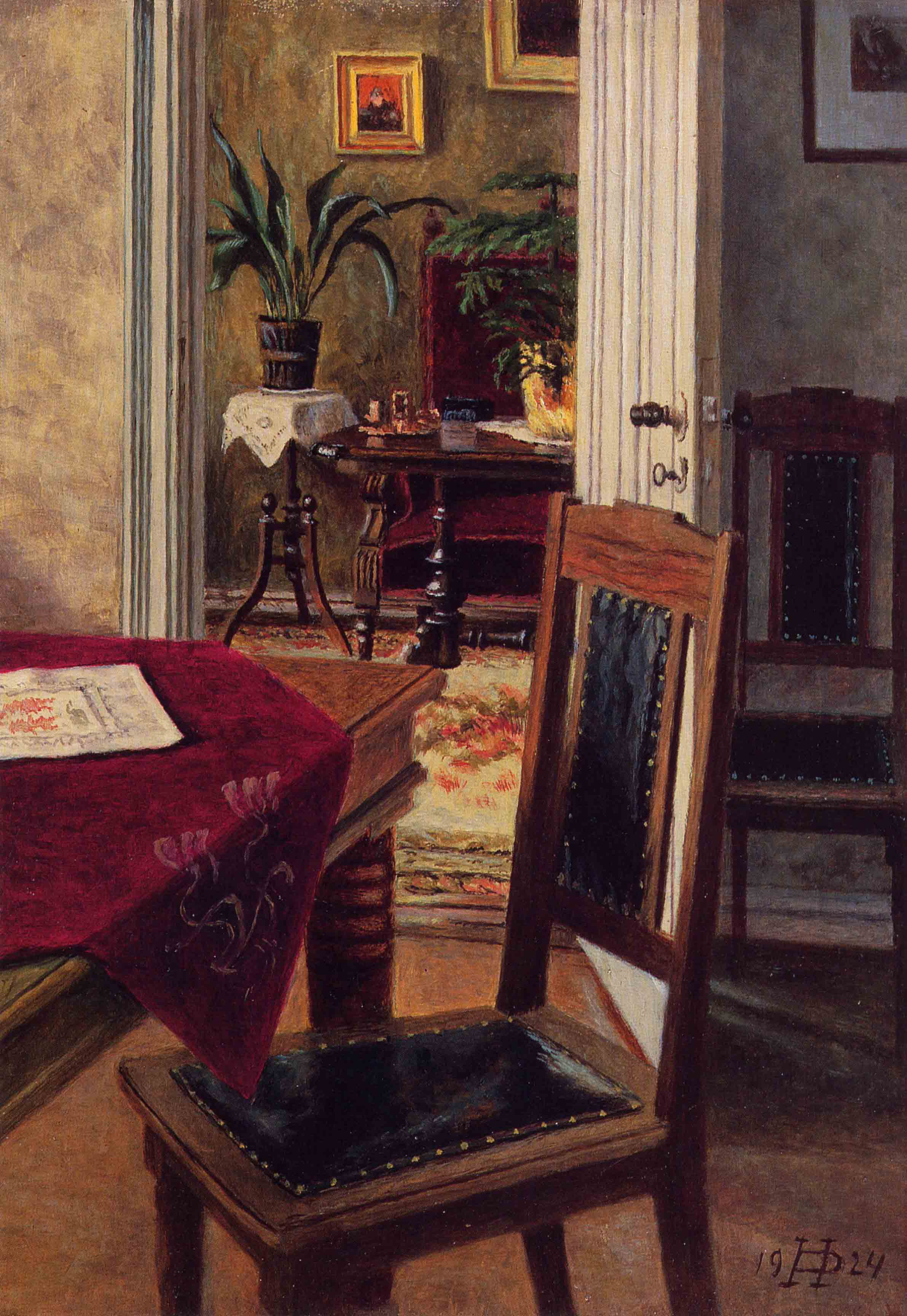
The Artist's Home, 1923

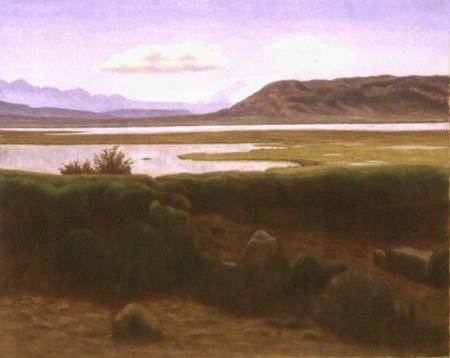
From Laugardalur, 1923
