= 1995 Súðavík avalanche =

Avalanche in Iceland

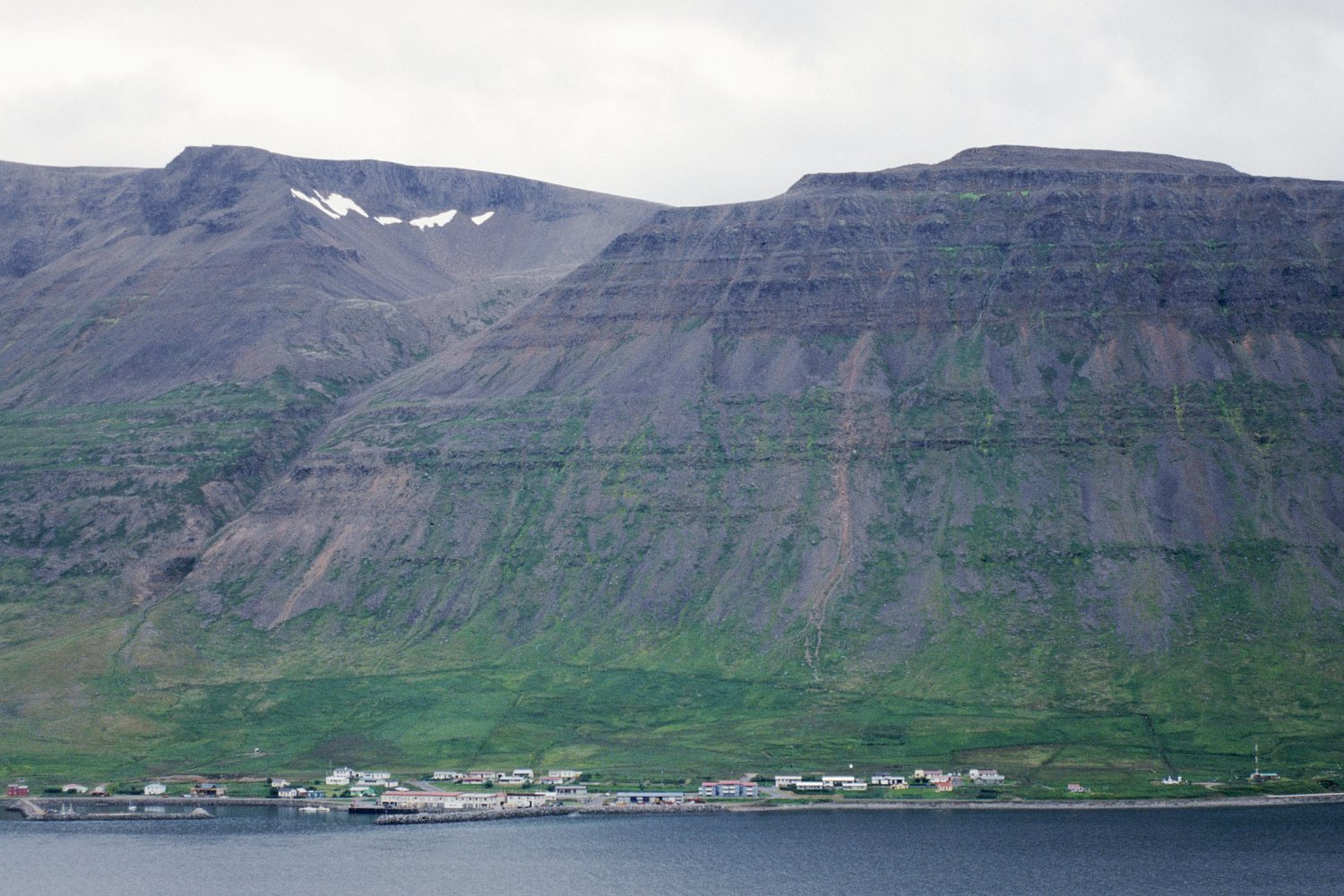
- The old part of Súðavík where the avalanche fell.
- Date: 16 January 1995
- Location: Súðavík, Iceland
- Cause: Avalanche
- Deaths: 14
- Injuries: 12
- Property damage: 15 houses damaged or destroyed

The 1995 Súðavík avalanche was an avalanche that struck the small fishing village of Súðavík in Iceland’s Westfjords on 16 January 1995, killing 14 people, including eight children, and injuring twelve. The disaster, along with the avalanche that killed 20 in Flateyri later in the year, had a profound effect on the nation and sparked a massive buildup of avalanche dams to protect towns in danger zones.

== The avalanche ==
On 16 January 1995, at 6:25 in the morning during a major storm, a 400 meters wide avalanche hit the village, destroying fifteen homes that housed 26 people. Four minutes later, the police in the neighboring town Ísafjörður received a distress call from the town, while residents who were unaffected by the avalanche immediately mounted a search and rescue operation and set up a rescue center in the local fishing factory, named Frosti. Shortly later, fishing trawlers owned by Frosti, who were moored nearby due to the weather, attempted to illuminate the area with spotlights, but were held back by poor visibility and inclement conditions. Four individuals were quickly found and 11 others were rescued over the next few hours.

Due to extremely bad weather conditions, road access to the town was cut off and rescue units, many of them volunteers, had to be brought by boats from Ísafjörður. Two hours after the avalanche, the first SAR members, along with rescue dogs, doctors and nurses, sailed from Ísafjörður with the ferry Fagranes and arrived roughly an hour later.

Later in the day, the Icelandic Coast Guard Vessel Týr undertook a 20-hour voyage from Reykjavík through the storm with additional rescue units, medical staff and supplies.

At 19:30, a second avalanche, 100 meter wide, hit the town and damaged several unoccupied houses, including the power station, knocking out power to the town. Due to the loss of power, the rescue command and control center is moved from the fish factory to the ferry Fagranes. Partial power is later restored to the factory by connecting it to the trawler Kofri.

Around 20:15, the trawler Margrét EA was hit by a rogue wave while transporting rescuers from Dýrafjörður [ˈtiːraˌfjœrðʏr̥]. The wave smashed all windows in the bridge and rendered the ships navigational equipment non-operational, forcing it to abandon its mission and seek shelter.

15 hours after the avalanche, rescuers found a 14-year old girl alive in the wreckage in critical condition.

The last survivor, a 10-year-old boy, was rescued 23 hours after the avalanche.

== Aftermath ==
In the aftermath of the disaster, the town was moved inwards in the fjord. Several houses still stand in the old part of the town but overnight stay there is forbidden during the winter time. The disaster, along with the 1995 Flateyri avalanche, also raised awareness to the dangers settlements in the country faced from avalanches as well as to the psychological trauma the survivors and the rescuers faced in the aftermath.
