= Flateyri =

- Village
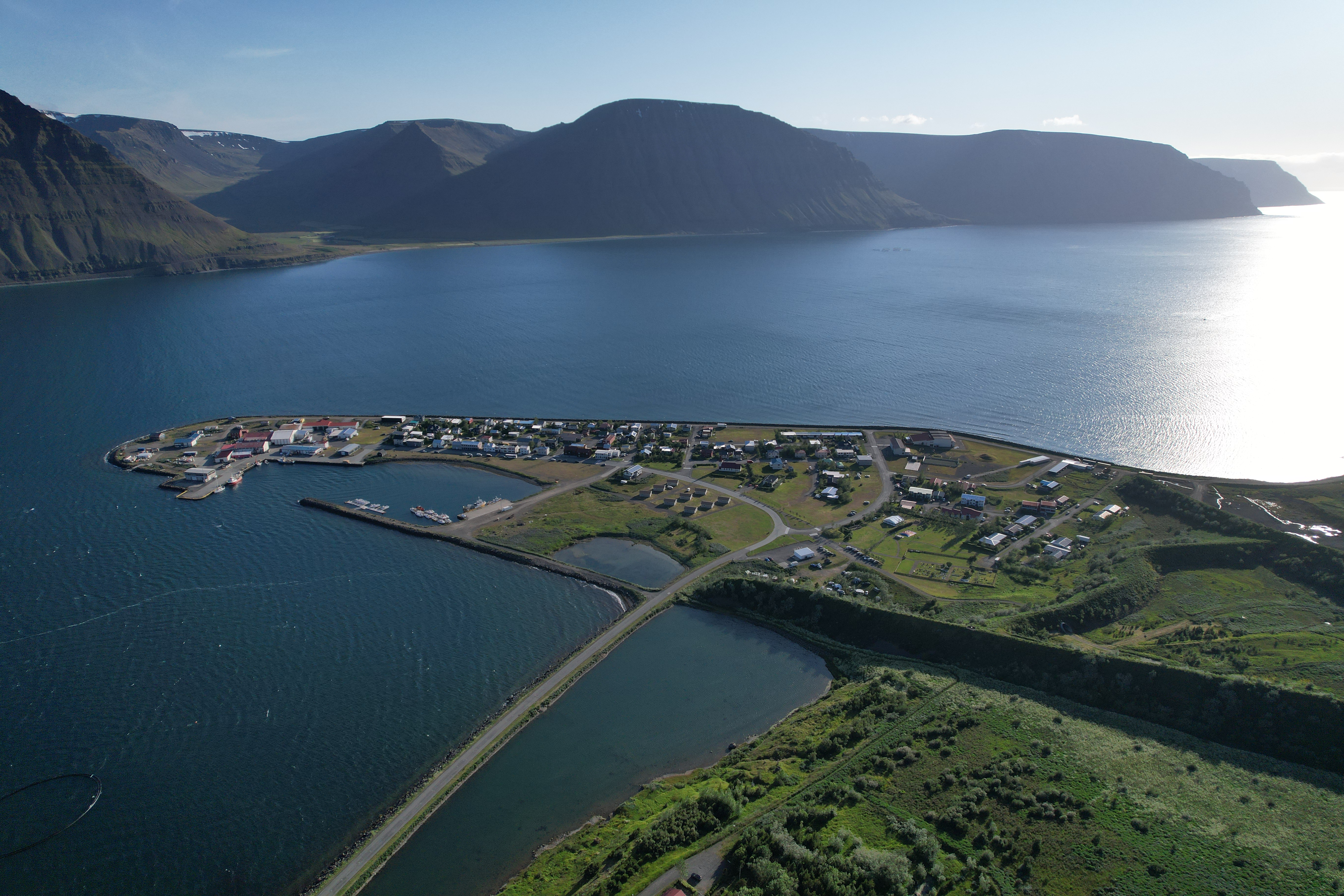
- Flateyri 2025

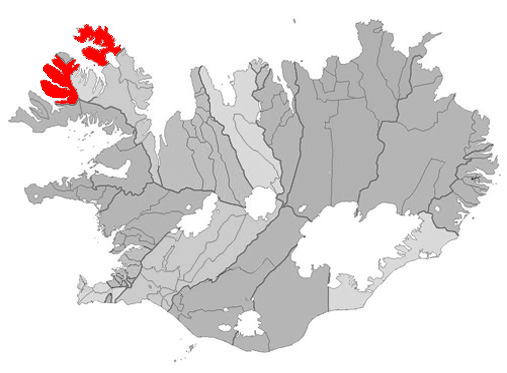
- Location of the municipality of Ísafjarðarbær

- Location within Iceland
- Coordinates: 66°03′N 23°31′W
- Country: Iceland
- Constituency: Northwest Constituency
- Region: Westfjords
- Municipality: Ísafjarðarbær

Population (1 January 2020)
  - Village: 267
  - Urban: 208
  - Metro: 59
- Time zone: UTC+0 (GMT)
- Póstnúmer: 425, 426

Flateyri (Icelandic: [ˈflaːtˌeiːrɪ]) is a village situated in Iceland's Westfjords. It is part of the municipality of Ísafjarðarbær and has a population of approximately 200, making it the largest settlement in Önundarfjörður.

== History ==
Flateyri has been a trading post since 1792 and temporarily became a major whaling center in the 19th century.

On October 26, 1995, an avalanche hit the village, destroying 29 homes and burying 45 people, which resulted in 20 fatalities. Since then a deflecting dam has been built to protect the village from any further avalanches.

In the 1990s, Flateyri prospered as a fishing village, but after the 2008–2011 financial crisis hit, its main fishing companies shut down, and many people left. A German fishing company has set up base in Flateyri and is currently fishing in and just out of Önundarfjörður.

The Esso gas station in Flateyri was the subject of a Belgian documentary in a series about gas stations around the world. The avalanche 1995 was also a subject of a feature documentary, 66°23 North West (The Day of The Avalanche), which premiered in a Reykjavík cinema on the 15th anniversary of the avalanche in 2010.

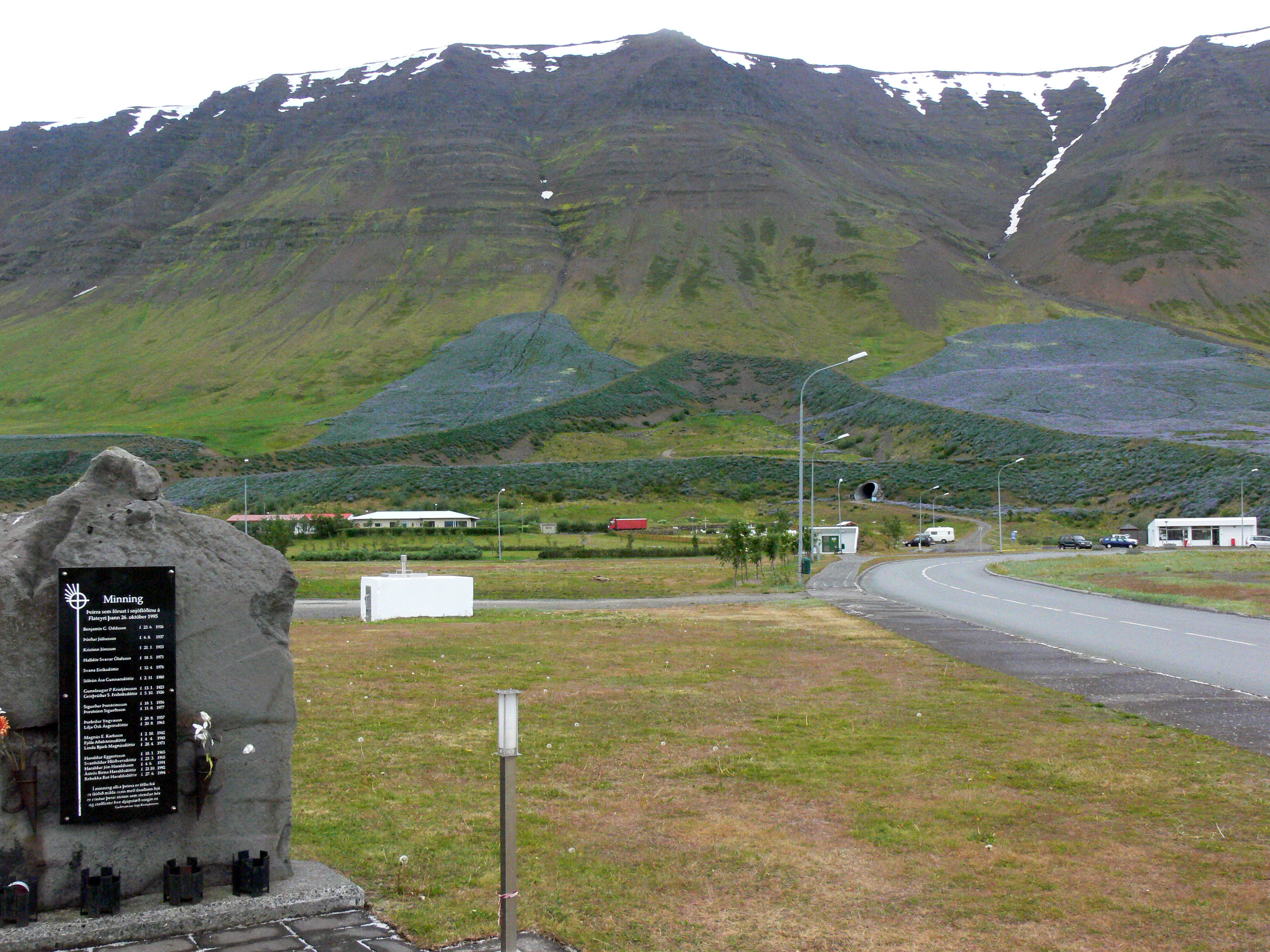
A memorial with the names of those that died In the avalanche on 26 October 1995 and in the background Avalanche dam in A form.

In September 2018, Flateyri Folk High School, a folk high school, opened, the second of its kind in Iceland.

On 14 January 2020, two large avalanches hit the avalanche dam above the village. The first avalanche slid down the right side of the dam and to the ocean where it caused a tsunami that hit the harbour and sank 6 of 7 boats located there. The second avalanche slid down the left side of the dam before spilling over it and hitting a house with four occupants. Three of the occupants were able to escape the house through a window, while the fourth one was rescued from the snow around 30 minutes later by ICE-SAR members. The town is also the home of 'the oldest original store in Iceland', founded in 1914, the Brothers Eyjolfsson bookstore.
