= Ağır Roman =

Ağır Roman may refer to:

- Ağır Roman (novel), a best-selling novel by Metin Kaçan
- Ağır Roman (film), a 1997 film directed by Mustafa Altıoklar, adapted from Metin Kaçan's novel
