= Küçük İskender =

Turkish writer (1964–2019)

- Born: Derman İskender Över; 28 May 1964; Istanbul
- Died: 3 July 2019 (aged 55); Beykoz, Istanbul
- Occupations: Poet, critic, actor
- Writing career
- Pen name: Küçük İskender
- Years active: 1985–2019
- Period: Cumhuriyet dönemi
- Notable work: Gözlerim Sığmıyor Yüzüme
- Notable awards: Orhon Murat Ariburnu Awards – 2000.

Derman İskender Över, also known as Küçük İskender (28 May 1964 – 3 July 2019), was a Turkish poet, critic and actor.

== Biography ==
İskender was born on 28 May 1964 in Istanbul. He graduated from Kabataş High School for Boys, then he studied in Istanbul University Cerrahpaşa Faculty of Medicine and left school in his last year. Later on, he studied at Department of Sociology in Istanbul University, and left after 3 years education. He wrote poems, criticisms, and essays in various magazines starting from the 1980s until the day he died. His first poem was published in the journal Milliyet Genç Sanat, under the name İskender Över. His poems began to be published professionally in Adam Sanat magazine in 1985.

=== Career ===
He shared the stage in Istanbul with Turkey's most important music figures like Baba Zula, Rashit, Teoman, Nejat Yavaşoğulları, Gripin, Hayko Cepkin, Zakkum, Harun Tekin, Derya Köroğlu, Mabel Matiz, Can Bonomo, model, Flört, Cemiyette Pişiyorum, also he shared the literature and cinema stages with Orhan Alkaya, Mustafa Altıoklar, Şenol Erdoğan, Pelin Batu, Haydar Ergülen, Arif Damar, Lale Müldür and Enver Ercan from the world. Küçük İskender is also accompanied by young poets such as Onur Akyıl, Gonca Özmen, Erdal Erdem, Harun Atak, Emre Varışlı, Emirhan Esenkova, Şakir Özüdogru, Sinem Sal, Zafer Çakır, especially in Beyoğlu, Ankara, İzmir, İzmit, Zonguldak, Elazığ, Gaziantep, Milas. He held performance nights in many different places such as, Seferihisar, Gumusluk, Bodrum, Bolu, Kirsehir, Nicosia.

=== Acting ===
Küçük İskender acted on 1997's movie Ağır Roman and 2002's movie O Şimdi Asker which are directed by Mustafa Altıoklar.

== Bibliography ==
The current publishing houses of the books and the first date they were published were taken into account.

=== Poem ===
- Gözlerim Sığmıyor Yüzüme (1988 / Adam Publications )
- Erotika (1991 / Adam Publications )
- Yirmi5April (1994 / YKY )
- Periler Ölürken Özür Diler (1994 / Gendaş )
- Suzidilara (1996 / Adam Publications )
- Güzel Annemin Hayal Gücü (Tek Baskılık Kitap) (1996 / Hera Şiir Kitaplığı )
- Ciddiye Alındığım Kara Parçaları (1997 / YKY )
- Papağana Silah Çekme! (1998 / Om Publications )
- Alp Krizi (Tek Baskılık Kitap) (1999 / Çalıntı Publications )
- Gözyaşlarım Nal Sesleri (1999 / Adam Publications )
- Bir Çift Siyah Deri Eldiven (2000 / Adam Publications )
- İpucu Bırakma Sanatı (2000 / Om Publications )
- Bahname (2000 / Om Publications )
- Teklifsiz Serseri (2001 / Om Publications )
- Kahramanlar Ölü Doğar (2001 / Om Publications )
- Çürük Et Deposu (2001 / Adam Publications )
- Eski Kral Deposu (2002 / Adam Publications )
- Siyah Beyaz Denizatları (Toplu Şiirler I) (2003 / Gendaş )
- Barudî (Kürtçe Çeviri) (2003 / Piya )
- Dicle ile Fırat (2004 / Gendaş )
- Bir Daha Bana Benzeme Angel! (2004 / Varlık )
- Sarı Şey (2010 / Sel Publications )
- Bu Defa Çok Fena (2011 / Sel Publications )
- Ali (2013 / Sel Publications )
- Elli belirsiz (2014 / Sel Publications )
- Ölen Sevgilimin Şiir Defteri (2017 / Can Publications )

=== Poetic text's ===
- Dedem Beni Korkuttu Hikâyeleri (1992 / Parantez )
- İkizler Burcu Hikâyeleri (1993 / Parantez )
- 666 (1994 / Gendaş )
- Galileo'nun Pergeli ( 2009 / Sel )
- The Kırmızı Başlıklı İstasyon Şefi (1996 / Parantez )
- Belden Aşağı Aşk Hikâyeleri (1996 / Parantez )
- Pop H'art (1997 / İnkılâp )
- Balık Burcu Hikâyeleri (2000 / Parantez )
- Made in Hell (2001 / İnkılâp )
- Insectisid (2002 / Stüdyo İmge )
- Necronomicon / Ölüm Kitabı (2004 / Turuncu Medya )
- Waliz Bir (2016 / Can )
- Her Şey Ayrı Yazılır ( 2016 / Can )

=== Novel ===
- Flu'es (1998 / Parantez)
- Cehenneme Gitme Yöntemleri (1999 / Parantez )
- Zatülcenp (2000 / İnkılâp )

=== Essays ===
- Kanlı Lağım Fareleri'den küçük İskender'e (2001 / Stüdyo İmge )
- Aşk Şiirleri Kolonisi (2004 / Everest )

=== Review / Criticism ===
- Şiirli Değnek (1995 / YKY )
- Eflatun Sufleler (2002 / Gendaş )
- Rimbaud'ya Akıl Notları (2004 / Alkım )

=== Diary studies ===
- Cangüncem (1996 / Gendaş )
- Bu defa çok fena (2011/ Sel)

=== Studies on his works ===
- Küçük İskender Kitabı-İnceleme, Tartışma ve Söyleşiler (2019 / İkaros Publications )

== Awards ==
- Orhon Murat Ariburnu Awards – 2000
- Melih Cevdet Anday Literature Award – 2006
- Erdal Öz Literature Award – 2014
- Necatigil Poetry Award – 2017
- Yunus Nadi Awards – 2018

== Books written about ==
- Ölü evindeki çılgın eğlence Can Sever'in Küçük İskender'in şiir kitabıyla ilgili yazısı
- Şiir Dinletileri Küçük İskender'in şiir dinletileri
- Salih Alexander Wolter: Erinnerung an küçük iskender.
- "Küçük İskender Kitabı'nın Anlamı" Murat Esmer'in yazısı.
