= Dinçel =

Dinçel is a surname. Notable people with the surname include:

- Merve Dinçel (born 1999), Turkish taekwondo athlete
- Savaş Dinçel (1942–2007), Turkish actor
