= Güngör =

Güngör is a masculine given name and surname of Turkish origin. Notable people with the name include:

== Given name ==
- Güngör Kaya (born 1990), Turkish-German footballer
- Güngör Şahinkaya (born 1954), Turkish footballer
- Güngör Uras (1933–2018), Turkish economist, journalist, academic, and author

== Surname ==
- Adnan Güngör (born 1980), Turkish footballer
- Aslı Güngör (born 1979), Turkish pop-folk singer and songwriter
- Buse Güngör (born 1994), Turkish footballer
- Çetin Güngör (born 1990), Turkish footballer
- Emre Güngör (born 1984), Turkish footballer
- Eren Güngör (born 1988), Turkish footballer
- Erol Güngör (1938–1983), Turkish sociologist, psychologist, and writer
- Feyza Sevil Güngör (born 1997), Turkish actress
- Hasan Güngör (1934–2011), Turkish wrestler
- Lena Saniye Güngör (born 1993), German politician
- Leyla Güngör (born 1993), Turkish-Swedish footballer
- Mustafa Güngör (born 1981), German international rugby union player
- Necla Güngör (born 1981), Turkish football manager
- Zerrin Güngör (born 1955), Turkish politician

== See also ==
- Koutsoventis
