= Mustafa Uğurlu =

Turkish actor (born 1955)

- Born: 25 November 1955 (age 69); Karaman, Turkey
- Occupation: Actor
- Years active: 1984–present
- Relatives: Ahmet Uğurlu (brother)

Mustafa Uğurlu (born 25 November 1955) is a Turkish stage, film and television actor.

Mustafa Uğurlu's father was a health officer and his mother was a housewife from Çorum. His father was appointed to Bursa when he was 2–3 years old and they moved there from Konya. He completed his primary, secondary and high school education in Bursa. He had four siblings, one of which, Ahmet Uğurlu, is also an actor. Uğurlu made his television debut in 1993 with a role in the series Rıza Beyler. His breakthrough came in 1998, with his role in the movie Ağır Roman, for which he won a Golden Orange Award for Best Supporting Actor. He continued his career in cinema and television, and appeared on stage and directed a number of plays for state theatres.

== Awards ==
- International Antalya Film Festival - Best Supporting Actor (Ağır Roman) - 1998

== Theatre ==
=== As actor ===
- Sokrates'in Son Gecesi : Stefan Tsanev : Istanbul State Theatre - 2008
- A Midsummer Night's Dream : William Shakespeare : Istanbul State Theatre - 2006
- Sersemler Evi : Toby Wilsher - Istanbul State Theatre - 2005
- King Lear : William Shakespeare - Istanbul State Theatre - 2002
- Bu Bir Rüyadır : Nâzım Hikmet - Istanbul State Theatre - 2001
- Haydutlar : Friedrich Schiller - Istanbul State Theatre - 2000
- Gilgamesh : Anonymous-Zeynep Avcı - Ankara State Theatre - 1998
- Ateşle Oynayan : Nihat Asyalı - Ankara State Theatre - 1997
- Kugular Şarkı Söylemez : Ferdi Merter - Ankara State Theatre
- Gürültülü Patırtılı Bir Hikaye : Savaş Dinçel - Ankara State Theatre - 1993
- Vatan Diye Diye : Namık Kemal\Necati Cumalı - Ankara State Theatre - 1990
- Ayla Öğretmen : Orhan Asena - Ankara State Theatre - 1991
- Bunu Yapan İki Kişi : Refik Erduran\Tülay Güngör - Ankara State Theatre - 1989
- Nalınlar : Necati Cumalı - Ankara State Theatre - 1986
- Barbaros Hayrettin : Ankara State Theatre
- Lisistrata : Aristophanes - Istanbul State Theatre - 1984
- Düşüş : Nahid Sırrı Örik\Kemal Bekir - Istanbul State Theatre - 1984

=== As director ===
- Nikah Kağıdı : Ephraim Kishon - Ankara State Theatre - 1996
- Tılsım : Mehmet Tayfun Orhon - Adana State Theatre - 1987
- Mustafa : Orhan Asena - Adana State Theatre - 1985

== Filmography ==
- (2023) Shahmaran (Davut) (TV series)
- (2022–) Aldatmak (Tarık Yenersoy) (TV series)
- (2021) Seni Çok Bekledim (Cemal) (TV series)
- (2018) Çarpışma (Selim Gür) (TV series)
- (2018) Bir Deli Rüzgâr (Cenap) (TV series)
- (2018) Babamın Günahları (Ferruh) (TV series)
- (2016) İçerde (Yusuf) (TV series)
- (2015) Milat (Asaf Demirci) (TV series)
- (2014) Düşler ve Umutlar (Musa)
- (2013) Galip Derviş (Mithat Akerman) (TV series)
- (2012) Çıplak Gerçek (TV series)
- (2012) Bir Zamanlar Osmanlı (TV series)
- (2011) Adalet Oyunu (film)
- (2007) Kader (TV series)
- (2006) Anadolu Kaplanı (TV series)
- (2005) Masum Değiliz (TV series)
- (2005) Yürek Çığlığı (TV film)
- (2004–2005) Bir Dilim Aşk (TV series)
- (2003) Çamur (film)
- (2002) Kolay Para (film)
- (2002) Zor Hedef (TV series)
- (1999) Asansör (film)
- (1997) Ağır Roman (film)
- (1997) Cafe Casablanca (TV series)
- (1996) Baş Belası (film)
- (1995) Melek Apartmanı (TV series)
- (1993) Rıza Beyler (TV series)
