= Erdal Öz Literature Award =

The Erdal Öz Prize is a Turkish literary award presented annually. It was established in 2008 by Can Publisher, in memory of author and founder of Can Publisher, Erdal Öz.

The winner receives 15,000 Turkish liras, approximately US $500.

== Award winners ==
- 2024 Necati Tosuner
- 2023 Füruzan
- 2022 Mehmet Eroğlu
- 2021 Selim İleri
- 2020 Jale Parla
- 2019 Latife Tekin
- 2018 Adalet Ağaoğlu
- 2017 Cevat Çapan
- 2016 Orhan Koçak
- 2015 Orhan Pamuk
- 2014 Küçük İskender
- 2013 Cemil Kavukçu
- 2012 Murathan Mungan
- 2011 Şavkar Altınel
- 2010 Nurdan Gürbilek
- 2009 İhsan Oktay Anar
- 2008 Gülten Akın

== See also ==
- Erdal Öz
- Turkish literature
- List of literary awards
- List of years in literature
- Literary award
