= Metin Kaçan =

Turkish writer (1961–2013)

- Born: 15 November 1961; Kayseri
- Died: 6 January 2013 (aged 51); Istanbul
- Occupation: Writer
- Writing career
- Notable work: Ağır Roman

Metin Kaçan (15 November 1961 – 6 January 2013) was a Turkish author, who is best known for his novel Ağır Roman (Cholera Street), which was translated into German (Kaçan 2003), and a movie (Ağır Roman), directed by Mustafa Altıoklar (1999), was based on it.

== Literary career ==
Besides Ağır Roman, Kaçan is also the author of the novel Fındık Sekiz, a collection of short stories, "A ship to the Islands" (Adalara Vapur, Kaçan 2002), and a book written in a mixed style between prose and poetry, entitled "The Tiger at Withdrawal" (Harman Kaplan, Kaçan 1999).

Much of Kaçan's writings deals with life in Istanbul, in particular its poor quarter Dolapdere (not far from Taksim Square). To Dolapdere, he sarcastically gave the name "Cholera" (Kolera in Turkish) in Ağır Roman, thereby recalling both its shabbiness and the fact that the great Polish poet Adam Mickiewicz died there from the cholera in 1855. Mickiewicz Museum at Dolapdere, still open to visitors today, figures in "Ağır Roman". The title of this novel plays ingeniously with the polysemy of the Turkish word Roman, which means both "gypsy" and "novel". Also, together with the adjective ağır, which means "heavy" or "slow" in Turkish, Roman is the designation for a special kind of street music, played by some of the novel's protagonists.

Ağır Roman tells the tragic story of a young hero, who grows up in Cholera quarter but finally fails and commits suicide. His failure parallels the failure of the quarter itself, whose ancient structures as well as its multi-ethnic and multi-religious composition disintegrate.

Fındık Sekiz tells a story about two cars, that appear sometimes as personified figures, and that take the semi-autobiographical protagonist Meto on a mystical journey. At the same time, Meto's conflict with a woman, who manages to have him thrown into prison through fraudulent statements, is related, which might reflect some of Kaçan's own experiences.

Kaçan's style is heavily imbued with Turkish slang. This choice gives his writings a non-conformistic, frequently vulgar, but overall extremely vivid and creative tone, which has been hailed, among others, by Yıldız Ecevit. Other characteristics of his writing are the personification of natural phenomena and inanimate items such as cars (in particular in Fındık Sekiz), autobiographical details (Kaçan grew up in Dolapdere), the blurring of the limitations of poetry and prose, and references to mysticism, in particular Muslim mysticism (Sufism). His best-selling novel, Ağır Roman was translated into French by Actes Sud in 2010.

== Rape conviction ==
In 1995, Kaçan was arrested for torturing and raping his ex-girlfriend. He was released on bail pending the outcome of the trial, which ended five years later with a prison sentence of eight years and nine months. The appeals court upheld Kaçan's conviction. In 2006, he was caught by the police in his hometown while attending the funeral of a relative and sent to prison to serve his sentence. After spending close to four years in prison, the remainder of his sentence was commuted.

== Death ==
Kaçan committed suicide by jumping from the Bosphorus Bridge on 6 January 2013. On that day, he took a cab in Esenler on the European side of Istanbul and requested to be driven to Üsküdar on the Asian side. He asked the driver to stop on the bridge so that he could take photographs. He got out of the vehicle, ran to the edge of the bridge, and threw himself off. His brother confirmed the suicide on 8 January. His body washed ashore on 18 January, twelve days after his disappearance, on the coast of Marmara Sea at Beylikdüzü. Kaçan was 51 years old.

== Literature by Metin Kaçan ==
- Jaklaban-Andante Graffiti (1989) Istanbul, Joker Yayınları
- Kaçan, Metin et Kemal Aratan İstedikleri Yere Gidenler (1991) Istanbul, Joker Yayınları
- Kaçan, Metin Ağır Roman (1995) Istanbul, Can Yayınları.
- Kaçan, Metin Fındık Sekiz (1997) Istanbul, Can Yayınları
- Kaçan, Metin Harman Kaplan (1999) Istanbul, Can Yayınları
- Kaçan, Metin Adalara Vapur (2002) Istanbul, Can Yayınları
- Kaçan, Metin Cholera Blues (2003) Berlin, Dağyeli
- Kaçan, Metin Cervantesin Yeğeni (2005) Istanbul, Can Yayınları
- Kaçan, Metin Haselnuss 8 (2008) Berlin, Dağyeli

== Literature about Metin Kaçan ==
- Hess 1998a. Hess, Michael Reinhard: Ağır Roman. Istanbuler Almanach 2 (1998). 64–66.
- Hess 1998b. Hess, Michael Reinhard: A Glance at the Wilder Side of Turkey: Ağır Roman. Orientalia Suecana 67 (1998). 55–67.
- Ecevit 2004. Ecevit, Yıldız: Türk Romanında Postmodernist Açılımlar [Postmodern Tendencies in the Turkish novel]. 3rd ed. Istanbul: Iletisim Yayınları.
- Hess 2005. Hess, Michael Reinhard: The Turkish Car Novel on a Trip: fındık sekiz by Metin Kaçan. Wiener Zeitschrift für die Kunde des Morgenlandes 95 (2005). 87–118.
