= Gümüşhane =

- Municipality
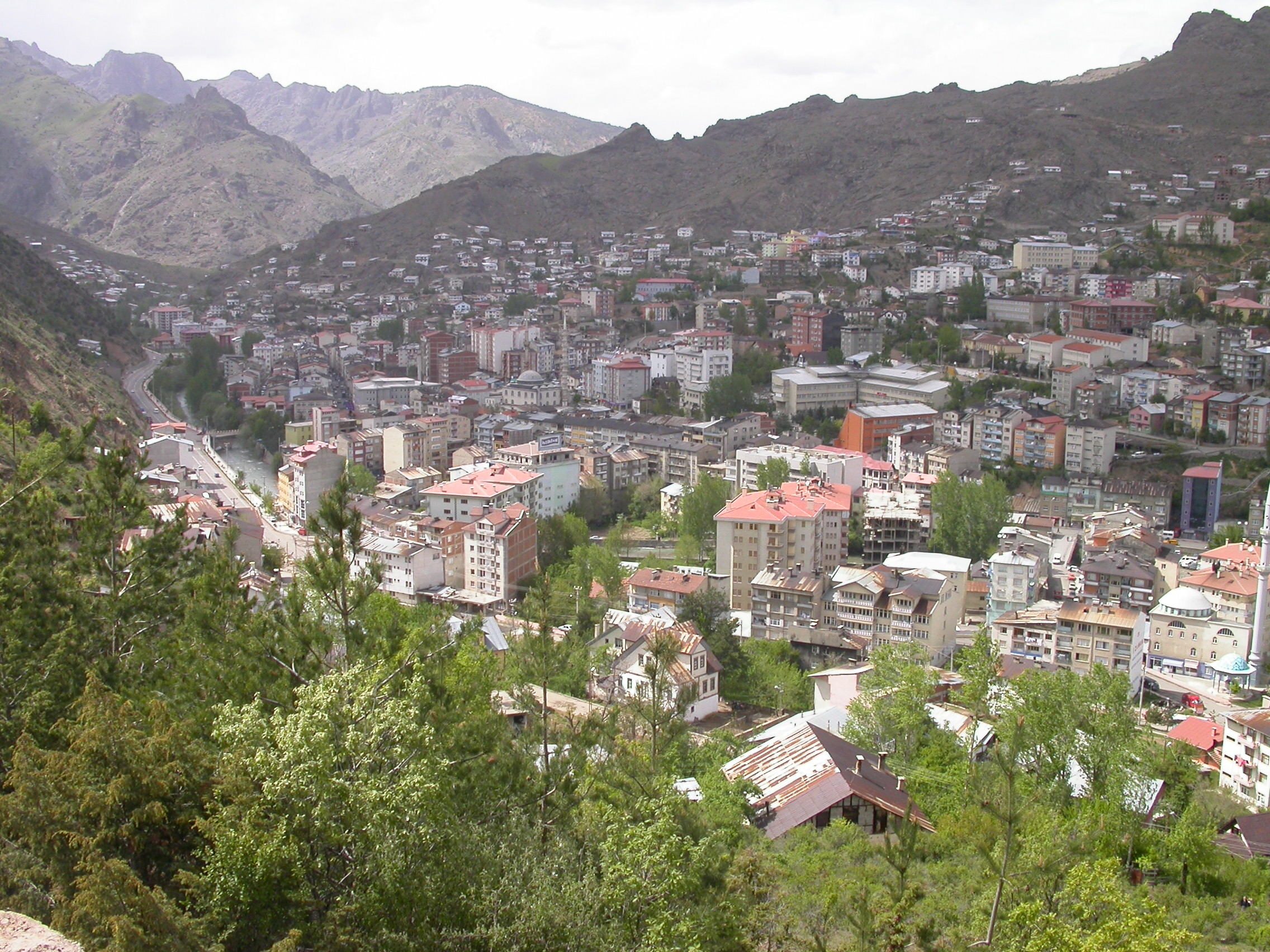
- View of Gümüşhane

- Coat of arms

- Location within Turkey
- Coordinates: 40°27′35″N 39°28′40″E
- Country: Turkey
- Province: Gümüşhane
- District: Gümüşhane

Government
  - Mayor: Vedat Soner Başer (MHP)
- Elevation: 1,153 m (3,783 ft)
- Population (2022): 39,214
- Time zone: UTC+3 (TRT)
- Postal code: 29830
- Area code: 0456
- Website: www.gumushane.bel.tr

Gümüşhane (Turkish: [ɟyˈmyʃhaːne]; lit. 'place of silver') is a city in the Black Sea Region of Turkey. It is the seat of Gümüşhane Province and Gümüşhane District. Its population is 39,214 (2022). The city lies along the Harşit River, about 40 miles (64 km) southwest of Trabzon. The city lies at an elevation of 1,153 m (3,783 ft).

== History ==
It is suggested that the ancient Thia (Θεία in Greek, a settlement of Roman, Late Roman and Byzantine periods) was located 4 mi (6.4 km) west of modern Gümüşhane, in modern Beşkilise. In the Byzantine period, there was a town named Tzanicha or Tzantzakon (Τζάνιχα, Τζάντζακον in Byzantine Greek) means land of Zan / Laz people, possibly located 2 miles (3.2 km) to the west of Gümüşhane. The area did not remain Laz after the 7th–9th centuries though.

Around 840 AD, the area was included in the new Roman (Byzantine) province of Chaldia (Χαλδία). It was later ruled by the Byzantine Empire of Trebizond.

During the Ottoman years, the sanjak of Gümüşhane fell under the administration successively of Rum Province, Erzurum Province and Trabzon Province, and was divided into four kazas: Gümüşhane, Torul (capital city Ardassa), Şiran (Cheriana), and Kelkit (Keltik).

The sanjak in which Gümüşhane was situated at some stage comprised 37 mines of argentiferous lead and six copper mines. There is no evidence that these mines were in use during Byzantine times.

As for the name of the city during the Ottoman period, Greek-speaking population was also using the name Gümüşhane (Γκιμισχανά and Κιουμουσχανά) but, in the first decades of the 19th century, the Greek name Argyropolis (Αργυρόπολις, from argyros "silver" and polis "city") was used. After the population exchange of 1923 many of the Greek inhabitants moved to the synonymous town in Attica, Greece. It is known for pestil

== Geography ==
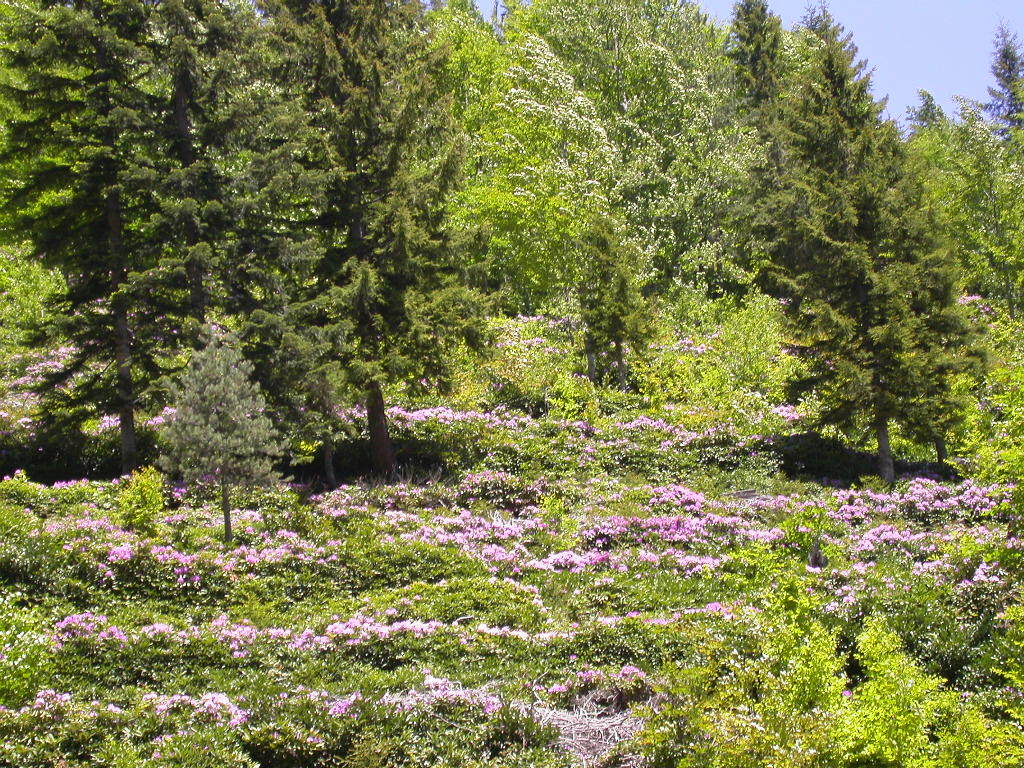
Örümcek Forest in Gümüşhane

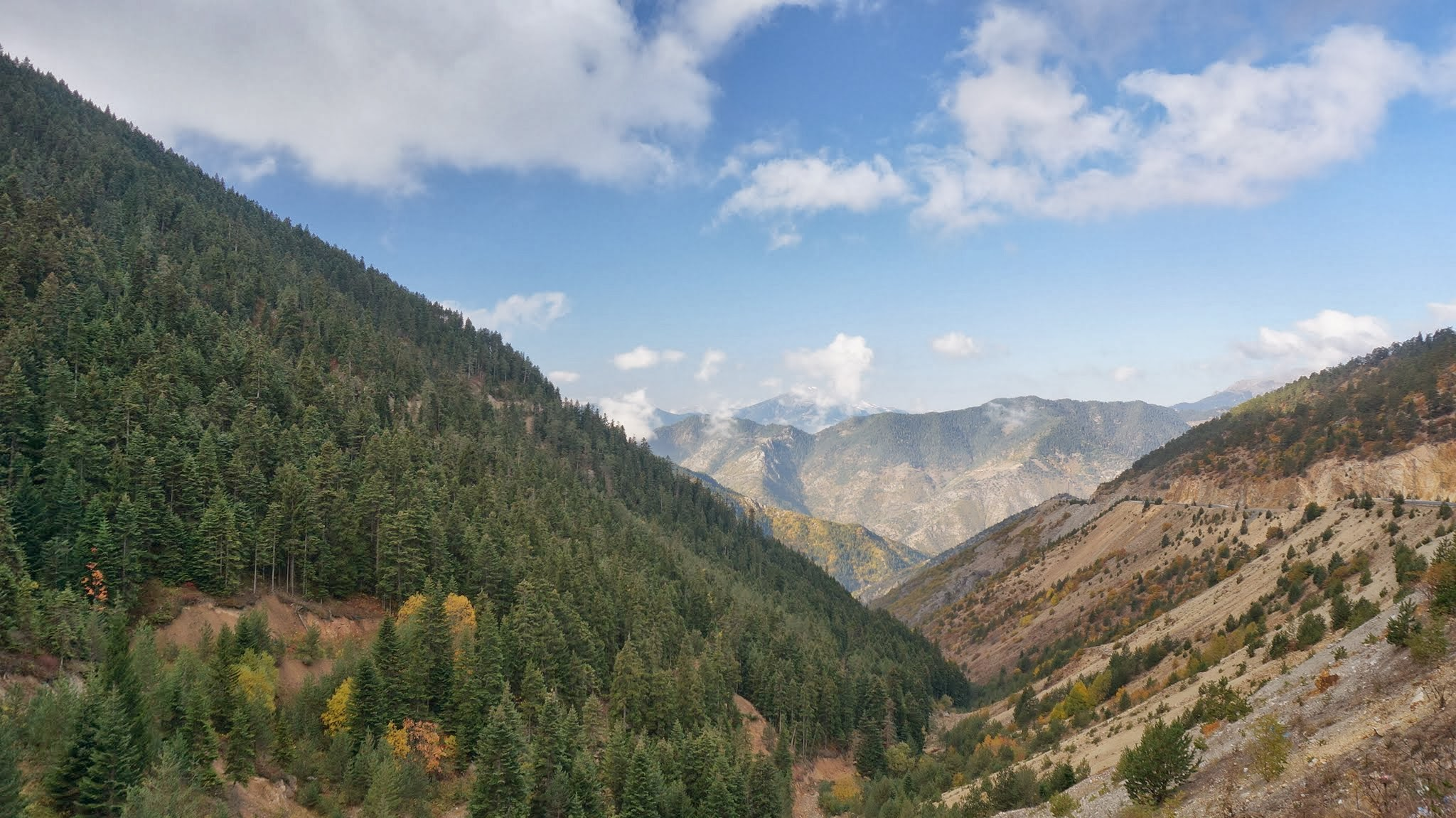
Zigana Torul in Gümüşhane

Gümüşhane is surrounded by high mountains, Zigana-Trabzon Mountains to the north, Çimen Mountains to the south, Giresun Mountains to the west and Pulur, Soğanlı Mountains to the east. Trekking is popular sport is at these mountains. Mount Zigana has a ski center on it and it is a well known tourist destination for winter sports. Abdal Musa Peak (3331 m.) is the highest peak within it. The main trees in the forests are Scotch pine and fir, and there are many animals and birds in the area. There are many lakes such as Karanlık Göl, Beş Göller, Artebel Gölü, Kara Göller which are at the peak of Gavurdağı Mountain, and are preserved as natural parks. All these mountains compose 56% of the area of Gümüşhane province.

=== Climate ===
Gümüşhane has a humid continental climate (Köppen climate classification: Dsb, bordering Dfb, or Trewartha climate classification: Dc) with cold and snowy winters and warm summers. In the height of summer; July and August, temperatures at midday usually surpass 28 °C, summer nights tend to become very cool due to the continentality of Gümüşhane, and in winter temperatures usually plummet to -10 °C and even go as low as -20 °C occasionally.

Highest recorded temperature:41.1 °C (106.0 °F) on 2 August 2017
Lowest recorded temperature:−25.7 °C (−14.3 °F) on 22 February 1985

Climate data for Gümüşhane (1991–2020, extremes 1961–2023)
Month	Jan	Feb	Mar	Apr	May	Jun	Jul	Aug	Sep	Oct	Nov	Dec	Year
Record high °C (°F)	15.5 (59.9)	18.0 (64.4)	24.0 (75.2)	29.0 (84.2)	34.4 (93.9)	36.2 (97.2)	41.0 (105.8)	41.1 (106.0)	37.7 (99.9)	32.0 (89.6)	22.3 (72.1)	19.2 (66.6)	41.1 (106.0)
Mean daily maximum °C (°F)	3.4 (38.1)	5.7 (42.3)	10.3 (50.5)	16.2 (61.2)	21.2 (70.2)	25.4 (77.7)	28.7 (83.7)	29.5 (85.1)	25.6 (78.1)	19.5 (67.1)	10.7 (51.3)	5.2 (41.4)	16.8 (62.2)
Daily mean °C (°F)	−1.4 (29.5)	−0.2 (31.6)	4.0 (39.2)	9.2 (48.6)	13.6 (56.5)	17.3 (63.1)	20.3 (68.5)	20.6 (69.1)	16.8 (62.2)	11.8 (53.2)	4.9 (40.8)	0.6 (33.1)	9.8 (49.6)
Mean daily minimum °C (°F)	−5.2 (22.6)	−4.8 (23.4)	−0.9 (30.4)	3.4 (38.1)	7.4 (45.3)	10.9 (51.6)	13.8 (56.8)	14.2 (57.6)	10.3 (50.5)	6.3 (43.3)	0.5 (32.9)	−3.0 (26.6)	4.4 (39.9)
Record low °C (°F)	−23.6 (−10.5)	−25.7 (−14.3)	−22.6 (−8.7)	−11.0 (12.2)	−2.8 (27.0)	1.8 (35.2)	4.5 (40.1)	4.9 (40.8)	−1.0 (30.2)	−4.8 (23.4)	−15.0 (5.0)	−21.0 (−5.8)	−25.7 (−14.3)
Average precipitation mm (inches)	35.0 (1.38)	33.4 (1.31)	46.7 (1.84)	59.0 (2.32)	68.3 (2.69)	46.2 (1.82)	14.0 (0.55)	14.2 (0.56)	25.2 (0.99)	46.1 (1.81)	41.9 (1.65)	35.9 (1.41)	465.9 (18.34)
Average precipitation days	11.27	11.03	13.67	13.83	15.9	10.4	4.13	4.2	6.07	9.63	9.23	11.17	120.5
Average relative humidity (%)	69.5	66.5	63.6	61.8	63.7	63.3	61.2	61.3	61.2	64.9	67.8	70.5	64.6
Mean monthly sunshine hours	27.4	101.6	141.7	176.8	223.4	260.5	302.0	286.7	224.6	161.4	61.0	18.3	1,985.4
Mean daily sunshine hours	1.0	3.6	4.6	5.9	7.2	8.7	9.7	9.2	7.5	5.2	2.1	1.0	5.5
Source 1: Turkish State Meteorological Service
Source 2: NCEI(humidity, sun 1991-2020)

== Historic sites: architecture and archaeology ==
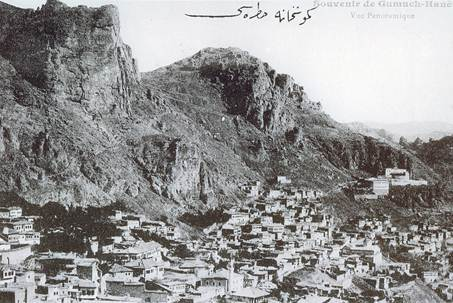
Old Gümüşhane city, 1910s Ottoman era postcard

Gümüşhane has a rich historical background so there are many historical places, mosques, churches, castles. The ancient city of Satala in the modern village of Sadak was the most important military camp of the ancient Roman Empire in the east. This place was ruled by the Colchians, Hittites, Assyrians, Urartu, Persians, Pontic Greeks, Romans, and Byzantines. Today, rests of the Sadak village is protected by the Ministry of Culture and Tourism. In addition, Süleymaniye Mosque is in the previous Gümüşhane settlement and it was commissioned by the Ottoman sultan Süleyman the Magnificent. Küçük Mosque and Çit Village Mosque are some of other popular mosques in the city. Besides, there are numerous churches within Gümüşhane. Santa Çakallı, Santa Terzili, Kalur Rock, Samamoni, and Theodor Churches are some examples of historical churches in Gümüşhane. During the medieval period one of the most important guardians of the road connecting Trabzon to Erzincan was the Byzantine fortress located about 2 kilometres (1.2 mi) northwest of modern Gümüşhane. An archaeological and historical assessment of this site as well as a scaled plan were published in 1985.[13] The impressive circuit walls and defenses are clearly evident at the accessible west approach to the lofty outcrop. In addition to several rooms and cisterns, the castle has two chapels; the easternmost was once covered by a dome.

== Natural environment ==
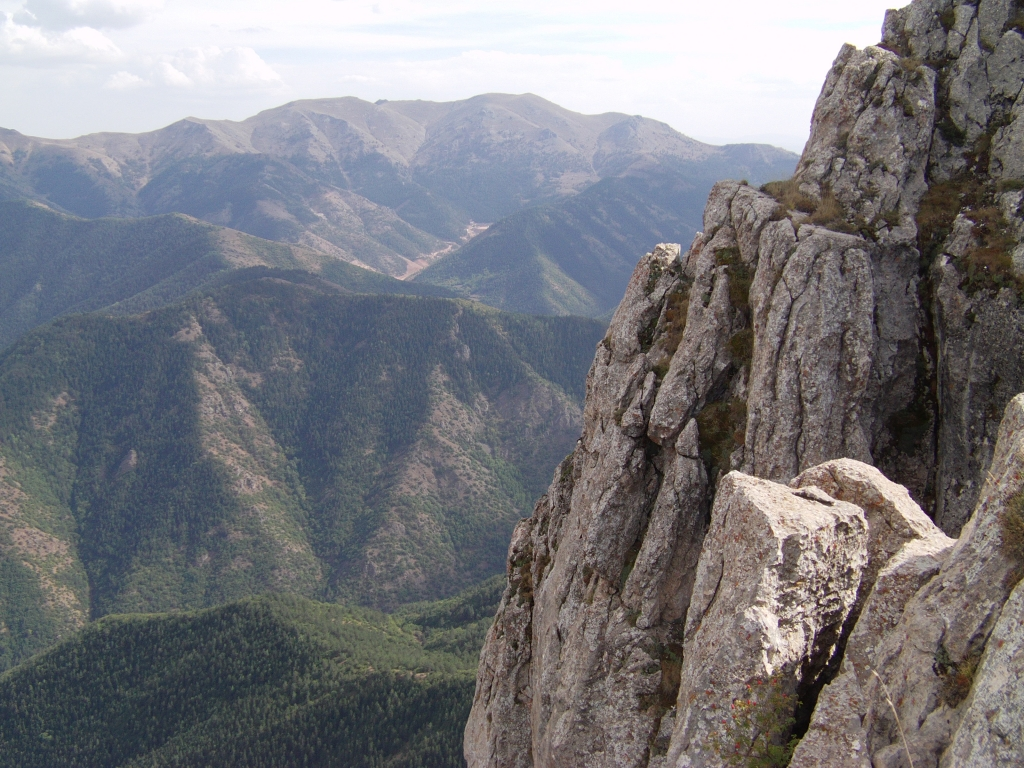
Ecel Rocks in Gümüşhane

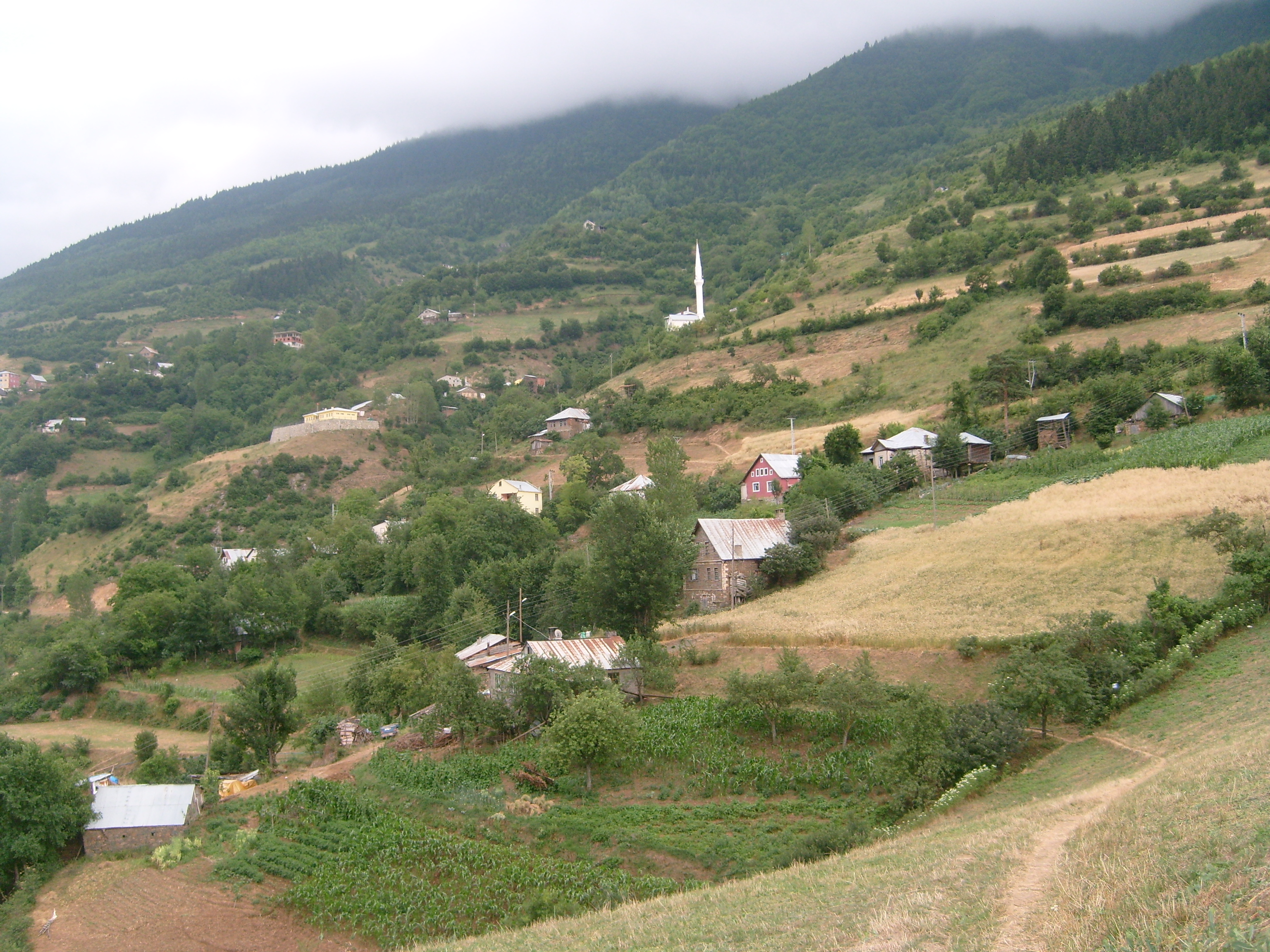
Kürtün village in Gümüşhane

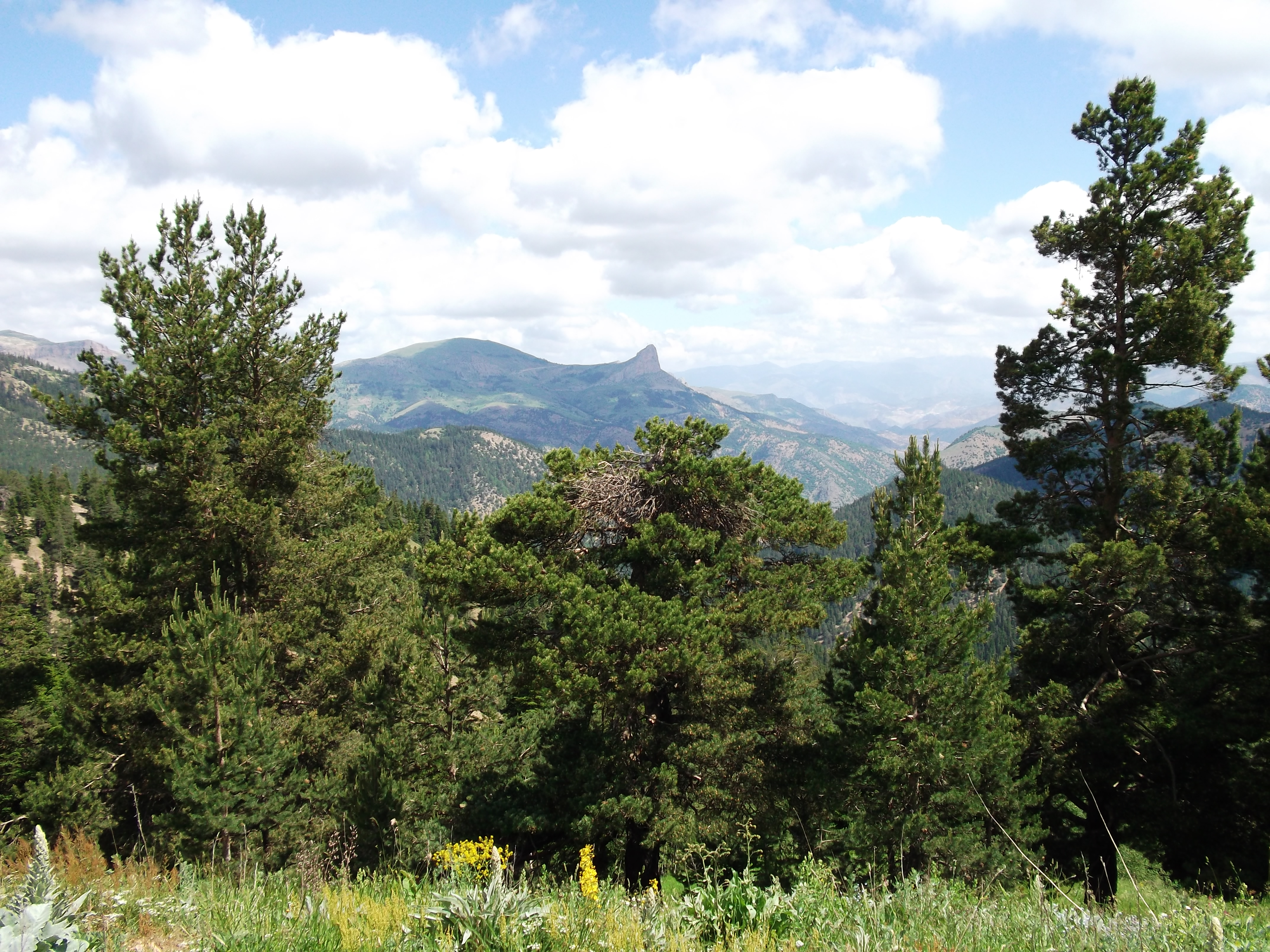
Mountains of Gümüşhane

There are numerous large and small caves which owe their formation to the geology - particularly the limestones - of Gümüşhane, including Alicli Agil Cave, Arili Cave, Altınbaşı Cave, Asarönü Ören Cave, Kartalkaya Cave, Ayiini Cave, K.Ardiçli Cave, Karçukuru Cave, Ardiçli Cave, Tepekli Cave, Uçbacalı Cave, Buz Cave and Ikisu Cave.

A distinctive local wildflower, bearing purple blossoms in Spring and frequently to be found growing in rock crevices around the mouths of Gümüşhane's many caves, is a member of the nightshade genus Physochlaina : Physochlaina orientalis - a plant rich in medicinally valuable tropane alkaloids of the type found also in belladonna.

The cave in Gümüşhane most visited by tourists is the 150 metres (490 ft) long Karaca Cave, popular because of its speleothems (= dripstone formations), including stalagmites, stalactites, columns and travertine pools. It is a fossil cave located between Torul and Gümüşhane, in which the lime-rich water percolating through fissures in the roof has slowly built up calcite structures of remarkable complexity. Other geological features of Gümüşhane include the numerous plateaux commanding views of the forested areas which surround them. These include the Zigana, Taşköprü, Artabel, Şiran and Kalis plateaux, which form fitting sites for the Summer festivals which are held there annually.

== Cuisine ==
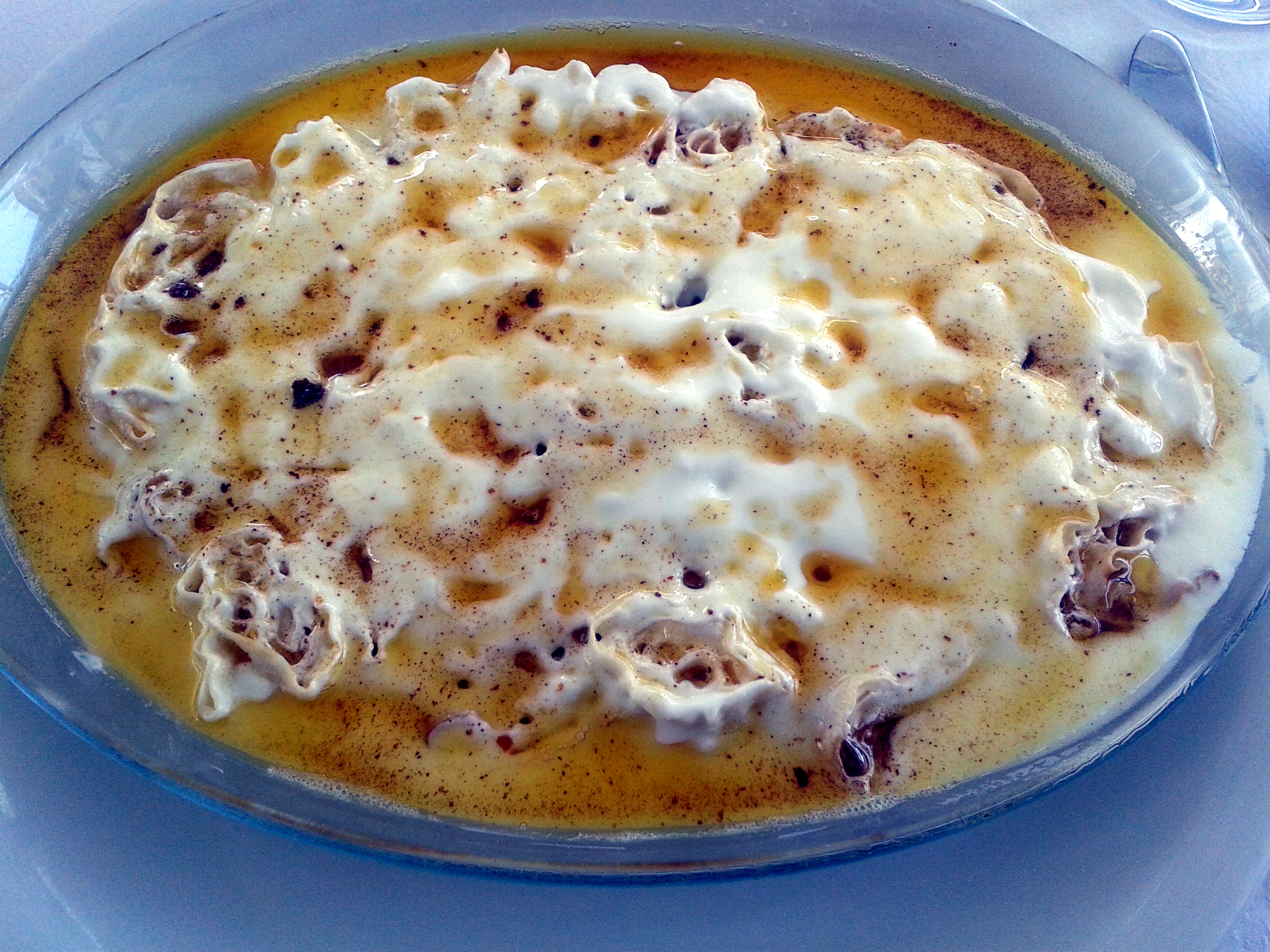
Siron is a traditional dish in Gümüşhane

Many native tourists participate in these festivals - not only for entertainment's sake, but also to shop for regional delicacies. Pestil and köme are renowned desserts of Gümüşhane, made from mulberries, honey, hazel nuts, walnuts and milk. In addition to köme and pestil, rosehips, apples, and walnuts are notable local foods put to use in the many different desserts which are numbered among the regional specialities of Gümüşhane. Nor is the town's rich food culture restricted to sweetmeats : mantı, lemis, erişte, borani, kuymak, evelek, dolması and siron feature among the savoury dishes local to Gümüşhane.

== Ethnic groups ==
=== Pontic Greek influence ===
Just after the fall of Trebizond (1461) and the town soon became a home for miners. Sultan Murad ΙΙΙ (1574–1595) appears to have granted extra privileges to the chief miners and the town prospered and soon became a centre of Hellenism. At the time, it had 60,000 residents. Its trade was increasing and the whole province of Chaldia was on the rise. Another example of its development was that they minted coins with the name Kioumous-hane on them. Another example was the settlement of chief mining families there such as the Sarasites, the Karatsades, the Stavracoglous, the Kalimachidises, the Grigorantons and others. There were also more jewellery shops opening, as well as more hagiography and other arts in the region.

The rise in wealth and abundance soon brought positive changes to the communities. From the beginning of the 18th century new schools were opening, and from 1723 the Greek Tuition Centre Frontistirion of Argyropolis was in full operation. The tuition centre became an educational institution and spiritual centre of the region. In 1650 the diocese was elevated to archdiocese status, and hundreds of churches and temples were built. New mines rich in minerals were discovered in Ak-dag Maden and Argoni, which resulted in a large exodus of miners from Argyropolis to the new mines. The further dramatic fall in population followed the Russo-Turkish War of 1829–30, when many Greek Pontians of the area collaborated with or welcomed the Russian army that occupied the area. So as to escape likely Turkish reprisals, the majority of the Pontic Greek population followed the Russian army as it withdrew back into Georgia and Southern Russia, many settling there and joining preexisting communities of Caucasus Greeks that had moved eastwards between the fall of the Empire of Trebizond in 1461 and the 1801 Russian annexation of Georgia, including another community of Pontic Greekophone miners who had settled in Lore, then Kingdom of Kartli of Georgia in 1778 invited by the king Heraclius II of Georgia. Some of the Pontic Greek mining families of Gumuşhane also settled in Nicomedia, Mesopotamia and other mining regions, from Tiflis (Tbilisi) to as far as Ak-Dağ and the Taurus. During those years tension between the Christian Greeks (Rum) and Muslim population was also growing due to the Greek Revolution and the public reversion to Greek Orthodoxy of many of the Stavriotes, Pontic Greeks who had superficially adopted Turkish Islam in the early Ottoman period but who had remained crypto-Christian in private.

During those confusing and troubling times many people became benefactors of Argyropolis, such as the Sarasite family and the influential teacher Georgios Kyriakidis. Kyriakidis identified the need to extract large sums of money from the churches of Saint George, Saint Theodore, Τίμιου Σταυρού and Παναγίας for the educational needs of the town. Sale of church property as well as donations and consecrations resulted in the erection of a new school at the Frontistirion of Argyropolis, a school which was to operate until the population exchange (1923). The Frontistirion comprised a three-grade high school, a seven-grade primary school including scholarship classes, and a six-grade girls' school, as well as a carpet-making technical school.

Another public building was the library, the Educational Society Kyriakidis, as well as the Metropolis of Chaldia. The Argyropolitans therefore are very much regarded as having some of the best resources in education, due mainly to their economic rise as a result of mining.

After the Pontic Greek Genocide (1914–1923), a few ethnic Pontic Greeks managed to flee to Greece. They settled in Macedonia, region of Northern Greece. A small group which settled in Naousa brought precious items with them from their churches in town, as well as items from the library of the Frontistirion, including rare manuscripts and books. This collection is still in use today by Euxenus Association of Pontians of Naoussa - National Library of Argyroupolis 'Kiriakidis' and is considered a prized asset of Naousa.

The town was occupied by the Russian army on July 20, 1916, but the Russians withdrew on February 15, 1918, after the fall of the czar. After the exchange (1923) no Orthodox remained in the region.

== Economy ==
Historically, Gümüşhane had mulberry tree plantations for sericulture.

== Gallery ==
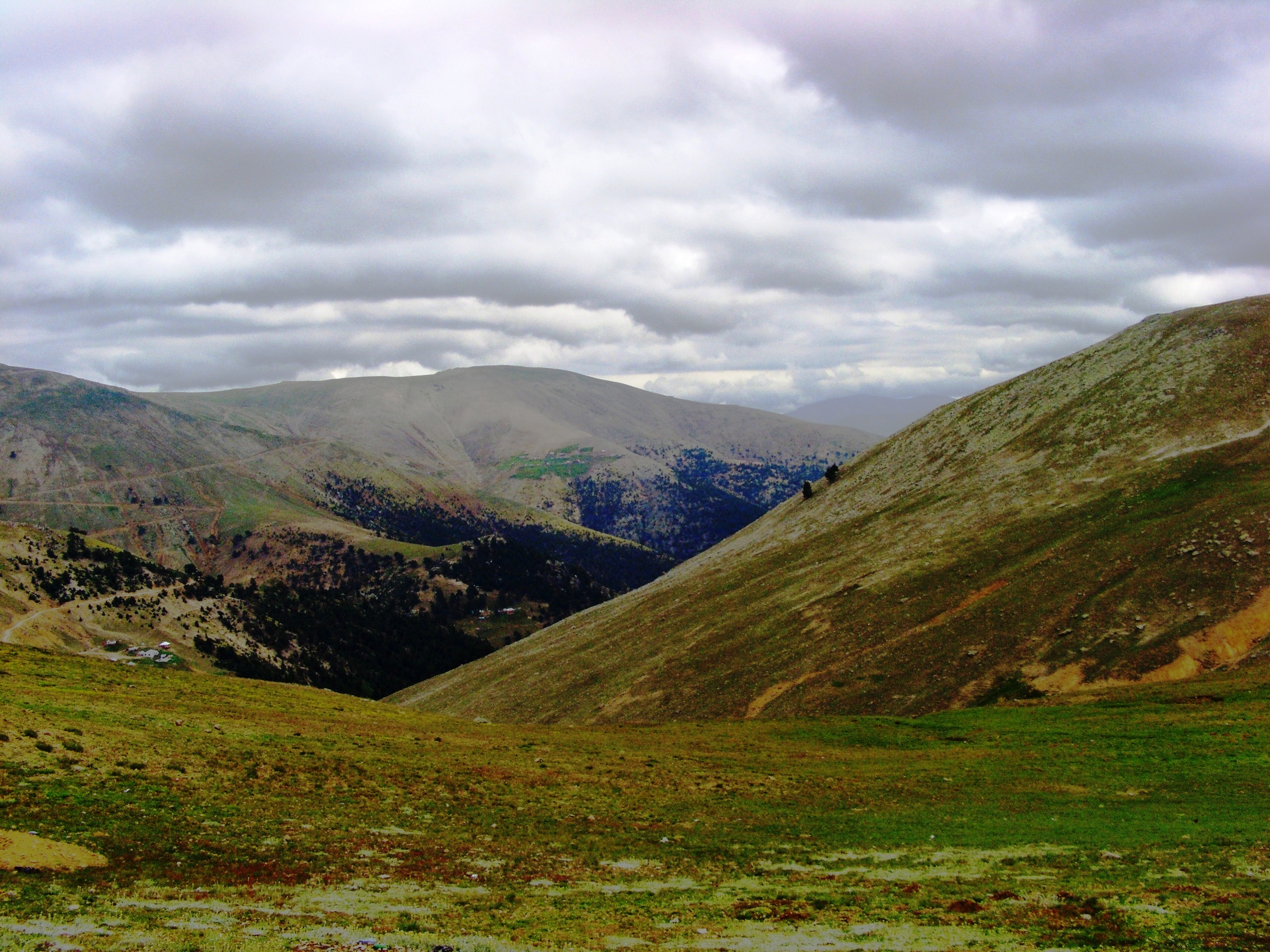
Torul

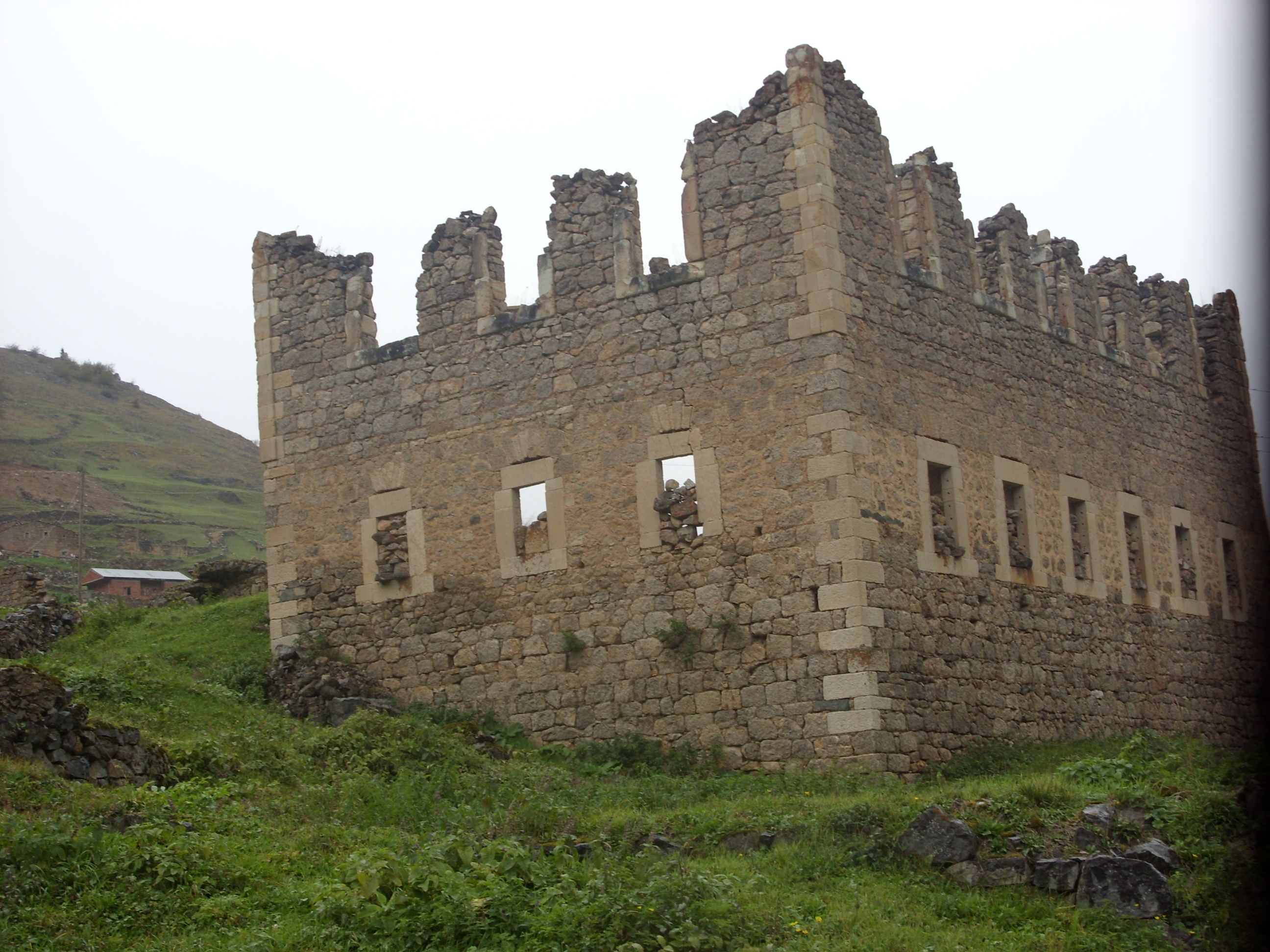
Santa Ruins in Gümüşhane

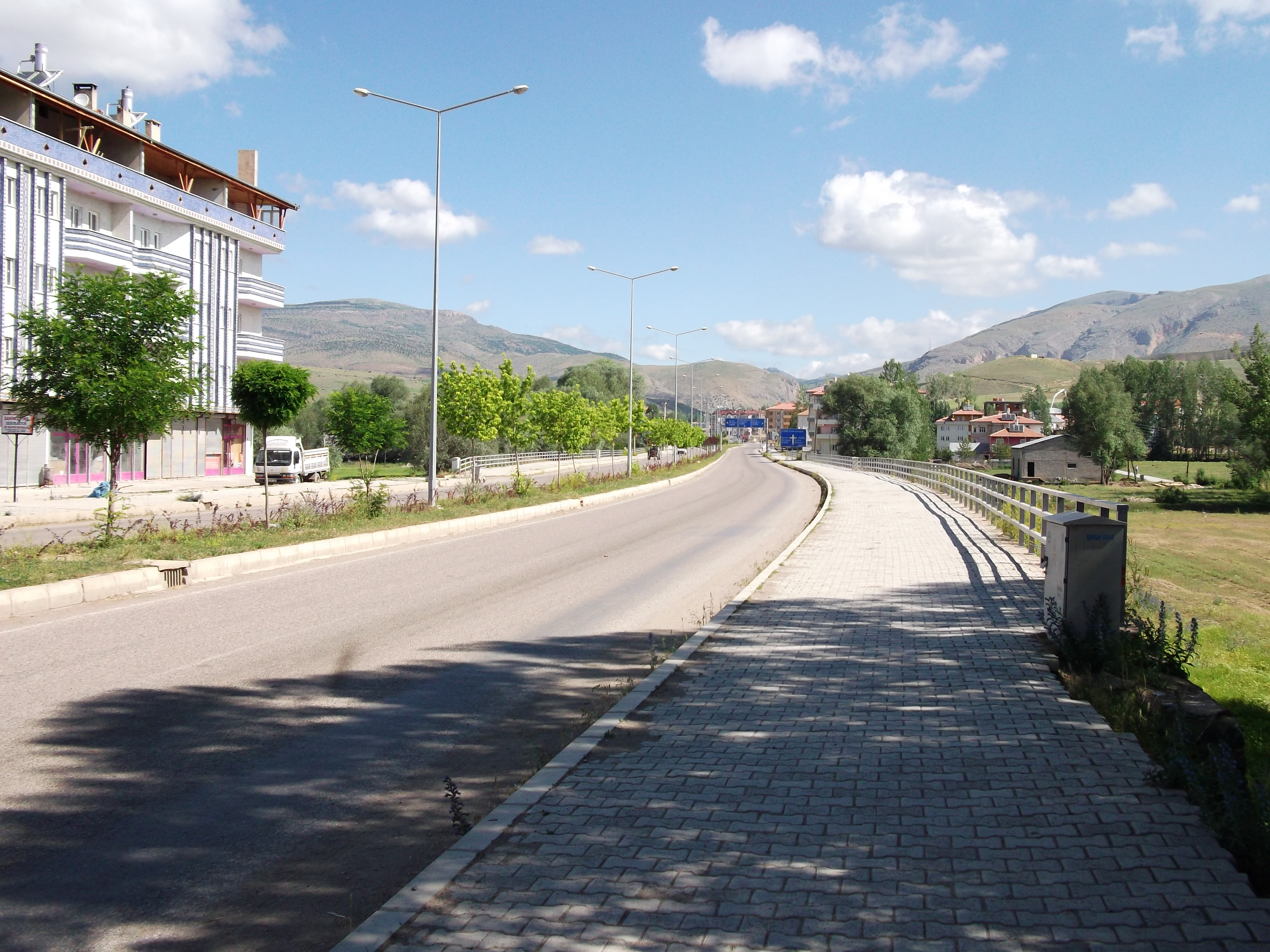
Highway to Gümüşhane city center

== Mayors of Gümüşhane ==
- 1984-1989 Yalçın Kurt ANAP
- 1989-1999 Naim Ağaç DYP
- 1999-2014 Mustafa Canlı MHP
- 2014-2024 Ercan Çimen AK Party
- 2024- current Vedat Soner Başer MHP

== Notable natives ==
- Hasan Fehmi Ataç (1879, Gümüşhane - 1961), Deputy during the Ottoman Empire and after declaration of republic first Minister of Agriculture and Minister of Finance of Turkey
- Nihal Atsız (1905, İstanbul - 1975), Prominent Turkish nationalist writer, born into a family from Gümüşhane
- Bahriye Üçok (1919, Trabzon - 1990), Turkish academic of theology, left-wing politician and writer, born into Ataç family of Gümüşhane
- Tarık Akan (1949, İstanbul - 2016), Turkish film actor and producer, born into a family from Gümüşhane
- Beren Saat (1984, Ankara - ), Turkish actress, born into a family from Gümüşhane
- Turgay Erdener (1957, Gümüşhane - ), Composer and teacher
- Aydın Doğan (1936, Kelkit - ), Entrepreneur and businessmen
- Mehmet Scholl (1970, Karlsruhe - ), German football manager and former player, born into a family from Torul
- Hikmet Temel Akarsu (1960, Gümüşhane - ), Turkish novelist, short-story writer, satirist and playwright
- Yusuf Güney (1984, Trabzon - ), Turkish singer, born into a family from Kelkit
- Armağan Çağlayan (1966, İstanbul - ), Turkish television producer and lawyer, born into a family from Gümüşhane on his maternal side.
- Saint George Karslidis (1901, Tsalka - 1959) Greek Elder
- Georgios Kandilaptis (1881, Gümüşhane - 1971), Greek scholar, journalist, teacher and writer
- Ertuğrul Sağlam (1969, Zonguldak - ), Turkish football manager and former player, born into a family from Torul
- Ziya Doğan (1961, Köse - ), Turkish football manager
- Tolga Zengin (1983, Hopa - ), Turkish football goalkeeper, born into a family from Torul
- Yunus Mallı (1992, Kaseel - ), Turkish footballer, born into a family from Şiran
- Mithat Demirel (1978, Berlin - ), German former professional basketball player of Turkish descent.

== Literature ==
- The Encyclopedia of Pontian Hellenism. Malliaris Pedia.
- The Byzantine Monuments and Topography of the Pontos . Anthony Bryer, David Winfield. Dumbarton Oaks p. 3
- Kiminas, Demetrius (2009). The Ecumenical Patriarchate: A History of Its Metropolitanates with Annotated Hierarch Catalogs. Wildside Press LLC. ISBN 9781434458766.
- Turkish Ministry of Culture and Tourism. "Mosques, Mausoleums and Churches in Gümüşhane".
