= Can Yayınları =

Turkish publishing company

- Company type: Private
- Industry: Media
- Founded: 1981
- Headquarters: Istanbul, Turkey
- Key people: Can Öz (owner)
- Website: canyayinlari.com

Can Yayınları (English: Life Publications) is a publishing company based in Istanbul, Turkey.

It has published authors including Orhan Pamuk, Metin Kaçan and Hikmet Temel Akarsu. It publishes both fiction and non-fiction books. It is a member of the Turkish Publishers Association.

It was founded in 1981 by Erdal Öz and others.
