= Karaca Cave =

Cave in Turkey

- Karaca Mağarası
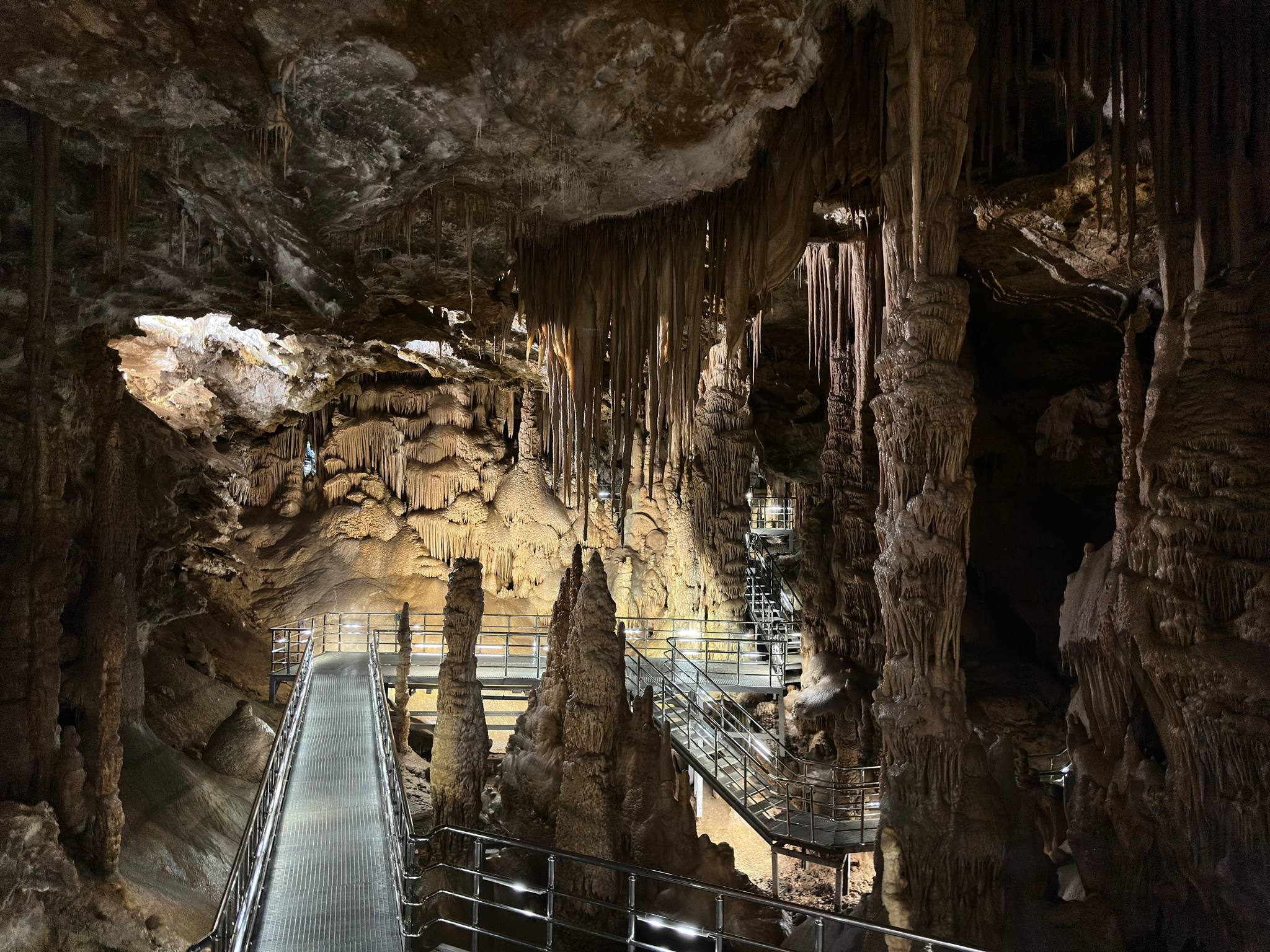
- Entrance to the cave

- Location within Turkey
- Location: Torul, Gümüşhane, Turkey
- Coordinates: 40°32′39″N 39°24′10″E
- Length: 105 m (344 ft)
- Height variation: 18 m (59 ft)

Karaca Cave (Turkish: Karaca Mağarası) is a network of caves located near the town of Torul in Gümüşhane Province, Turkey.

Although the cave was known to the people living in that region, it became open to tourism as a result of the scientific research conducted by Sukru Eroz, a geological engineer from Cebeli Village, between the years 1983-1990. Prof. Dr. Remzi Dilek and his team from the Department of Geological Engineering at the (Karadeniz Technical University) contributed a lot of research and scientific studies of the cave. As a result of these studies, it was opened to tourism in 1996 after the Ministry of Culture and Tourism was informed and the cave was officially registered.

== Location of the cave ==
Karaca Cave is surrounded by the borders of the village Cebeli in Torul. It is 17 km (11 mi) far away from the city center at an elevation of 1,550 m (5,090 ft) high above sea level. The cave attracts the most tourists in Gumushane.

The cave can be reached by following the 4 km (2.5 mi) road, which branches off from the 12th km of the Gumushane-Trabzon highway D.885 / E97. There are restaurants and other small stores located near the cave.

== Characteristics ==
In the area extending between Gümüşhane and Torul, there are extensive formations consisting of various types of extrusive, igneous rock, including andesitic and basaltic lavas, tuffs and agglomerates. The total thickness of these deposits reaches 1,000 m (3,300 ft). These igneous strata are interleaved with sedimentary layers, varying in thickness between 100 and 200 m (330 and 660 ft) and consisting of limestone and certain other types of sedimentary rock. The Karaca Cave formed in one of these layers of highly fissured, massive limestone sandwiched between volcanics.

Karaca Cave is rich in dripstone formations of many different shapes and colours, including stalactites, stalagmites, and travertines. There are also many cave roses located on certain of the travertines and stalagmites.

Some of the dripstone pools are very large - particularly those in the inner parts of the cave, which range up to 1 m (3.3 ft) in depth.

The travertines vary in colour from white to dark blue, revealing the presence of high levels of iron and magnesium minerals in the cave waters.

The cave system is disposed more or less in a level plane and consists of four interconnected caverns. Two of these caverns are further subdivided by 'walls' composed of dripstone, and it could thus be argued that Karaca comprises not four but six chambers.

The height of the cave entrance is about 1.8 m (5.9 ft) - the height of an average man - but, as one moves deeper into the interior increases steadily, the cave opening out into a funnel shape. The cave is roughly 105 m (344 ft) in length, averages 18 m (59 ft) in height and has a total floor area of 1,500 m^{2} (16,000 sq ft).

There is no stream in Karaca, water percolating through fissures in the roof of the cave being responsible for the formation of the dripstones. Such water as persists within the cave is in the form of various ponds and pools. The ponds at the entrance of the third and fourth caverns contain a considerable volume of water.

There is no significant air circulation in the cave, with the result that the level of humidity in its atmosphere increases from around 65% at the entrance to up to 75% in the cave's interior. The air inside the cave is cooler than that outside it in summertime and warmer in winter. Because of this, it is considered to have a microclimate of its own.

The Karaca Cave has been open to visitors since 1996.
