= Caner Şahin =

Turkish actor (born 1992)

- Born: Caner Şahin; 13 April 1992 (age 34); Eskişehir, Turkey
- Education: Istanbul Technical University (mechanical engineering); Istanbul University State Conservatory (theatre)
- Occupation: Actor
- Years active: 2016–present

Caner Şahin (born 13 April 1992) is a Turkish actor. He made his television debut in 2016 and became known for his roles in several Turkish drama series.

== Biography ==
Born in 1992 in Eskişehir, Turkey, to parents who were both former teachers, Caner Şahin is the third and youngest child in a family of three. After graduating from high school in his hometown, he decided to enroll in the Faculty of Mechanical engineering at Istanbul Technical University, where he joined the theater group. Later, after becoming interested in acting, he decided to leave the Faculty of Mechanical engineering to enroll in the Theater Department at Istanbul University State Conservatory, where he graduated. During his years at the conservatory, he founded the Lahza Theater with his friends.

In 2016, he made his small-screen debut as Kadir Kayalar in the series Babam ve Ailesi. The following year, in 2017, he played Bahadır Akıncı in the series Tutsak. In 2018, he landed the role of Salih Akmeşe in the series Nefes Nefese and made his film debut as Ramazan in the film Kardeşler directed by Ömür Atay. In 2019, he played Kartal in the series Kuzgun, followed in 2020 by the role of Ali in the series Rise of Empires: Ottoman. In 2021, he played the role of Selahattin in the series Seni Çok Bekledim and Sinan in the series Dünya Hali. From 2022 to 2024, he was cast as Tolga Kaşifoğlu in the series Aldatmak. In 2024, he starred in the play Biri Gelecek Ya Da Bir Şey Olacak. In 2024, he played the role of Ozan Erdemir in the series Bir Gece Masalı, followed by the role of Salih in the series İmam Gazali.

== Filmograhy ==
=== Cinema ===
Year	Title	Role	Director
2018	Kardeşler	Ramazan	Ömür Atay

=== Television ===
Year	Title	Role	Network	Notes
2016	Babam ve Ailesi	Kadir Kayalar	Kanal D	13 episodes
2017	Tutsak	Bahadır Akıncı	Kanal D	9 episodes
2018	Nefes Nefese	Salih Akmeşe	Star TV	10 episodes
2019	''Kuzgun''	Kartal	Star TV	21 episodes
2021	Seni Çok Bekledim	Selahattin	Star TV	13 episodes
2021	Dünya Hali	Sinan	TRT 1	20 episodes
2022–2024	Aldatmak	Tolga Kaşifoğlu	ATV	71 episodes
2025	Bir Gece Masalı	Ozan Erdemir	ATV	11 episodes

=== Web series ===
Year	Title	Role	Platform	Notes
2020	Rise of Empires: Ottoman	Ali	Netflix	2 episodes
2025	İmam Gazali	Salih	tabii	¿? episodes

== Theatre ==
Year	Title
2024	Biri Gelecek Ya Da Bir Şey Olacak

== Awards ==
Year	Award	Category	Work	Result	Notes
2018	Adana Film Festival	Best Actor	Kardeşler	Won	With Yiğit Ege Yazar
2018	Karlovy Vary International Film Festival	Best Actor	Kardeşler	Won	
