= Aldatmak =

2022 Turkish television series

- Also known as: Deceive
- Genre: Drama
- Screenplay by: Yıldız Tunç
- Directed by: Murat Saraçoğlu
- Starring: Vahide Perçin; Ercan Kesal; Mustafa Uğurlu; Yusuf Çim
- Country of origin: Turkey
- Original language: Turkish
- No. of seasons: 2
- No. of episodes: 71

Production
- Producers: Timur Savcı; Burak Sağyaşar
- Production location: Istanbul
- Running time: 130 minutes
- Production companies: Tims&B Productions

Original release
- Network: ATV
- Release: September 22, 2022 – June 6, 2024

Aldatmak (English: "Deceive") is a Turkish drama series produced by Timur Savcı and Burak Sağyaşar, which premiered on ATV on September 22, 2022. The drama in which Vahide Perçin, Ercan Kesal, and Mustafa Uğurlu starred is directed by Murat Saraçoğlu and written by Yıldız Tunç.

== Synopsis ==
Güzideh Yenersoy is a family court judge. She is portrayed as an honest and principled woman who has saved many marriages, ensured that children receive affection and love, and has always been on the side of justice. She believes she has an exemplary family with her husband and two children, that they live an honorable life, and that their marriage will continue in love, happiness and peace. One day, Güzide accidentally pulls on a thread and realizes that her happy family is not a warm home, but a sand castle.

== Cast and character ==
Actor/Actress	Episodes	Character	Description
Vahide Perçin	1-71	Güzide Özgüder/Okuyan/Yenersoy	She is Sezai's wife and the mother of Ozan and Dündar. She is Tarık's ex-wife and Oylum's adoptive mother. She is Ümit's older sister and Nazan's best friend. She is Kahraman's mother-in-law. She is Can's step-grandmother. She is Behram's former mother-in-law and Mualla's former coscre. She is Zennure' coscre. She is Ipek's stepmother. She is Zeliș's former mother-in-law and Ilknur's former coscre. She was a highly successful family court judge. She was respected and feared for her absolute integrity.
Ercan Kesal	1-71	Ali Sezai Okuyan	He is Güzide's husband and the father of Ipek and Kahraman. He is stepfather of Ozan, Dündar and Oylum. He is Oltan's father-in-law and Ümit's brother-in-law.
Mustafa Uğurlu	1-71	Murat Tarık Yenersoy	He is the father of Ozan, Dündar and Öykü and the ex-husband of Güzide and Yeșim.
Yusuf Çim	1-71	Ozan Yenersoy	He is the son of Güzide and Tarık and the brother of Dündar and the half-brother of Öykü and Oylum. He is Zeliș's ex-husband and Lara's ex-boyfriend.
Cem Bender	1-71	Oltan Kaşifoğlu	He is Tolga's father and Can's grandfather.
Caner Şahin	1-71	Tolga Kaşifoğlu	He is Oltan's son and Can's father.
Feyza Sevil Güngör	1-71	Oylum Yenersoy/Dicleli/Sarpoğlu	She is the adopted daughter of Güzide and Tarık, and she is Can's mother.
Asena Girişken	1-71	Yeşim Denizeren/Yenersoy	She is Öykü's mother and Tarık's ex-wife.
Cem Sürgit	1-71	Ümit Özgüder	He is Güzide's brother and Ozan and Dündar's uncle.
Meltem Baytok	1-71	Nazan Tokluca	She is Güzide's best friend and a Judge at the family court.
Burcu Söyler	1-71	Selin Atamanoğlu/Kașifoğlu	She is the daughter of Fatih and Elif and Tolga's ex-wife.
Canan Ürekil	1-71	Zeynep (Zeyno)	She is Güzide's employee and works ın the Yenersoy family home.
Masal Ayșe Gencer	1-71	Öykü Denizeren/Yenersoy	She is the daughter of Tarık and Yeșim. She is Ozan, Dündar and Oylum's half-sister.
Özlem Tokaslan	18-71	Ilknur Gülsoy	She is Zeliș's mother and Yeșim's aunt.
Nursel Köse	28-71	Mualla Dicleli	She is Behram's mother and Nazan's aunt.
Berkay Ateș	36-71	Kahraman Sarpoğlu	He is the son of Sezai and Zennure and the husband of Oylum.
Ilayda Çevik	36-71	Ipek Okuyan/Kașifoğlu	She is Sezai's daughter and Oltan's wife.
Alize Gördüm	36-71	Azra	She is Tarık's niece and the cousin of Dündar, Ozan and Öykü.
	36-71	Can Kașifoğlu/Yenersoy/Dicleli	He is the son of Oylum and Tolga and the nephew of Oltan.
Ayça Ișildar	52-71	Neva	She is Ipek's nanny and works ın Sezai's house.
Yeșim Salkım	58-71	Zennure (Kadriye)	She is Kahraman's mother and Oylum's mother-in-law.
Emin Günenç	59-71	Dündar Terzioglu	He is the son of Güzide and Tarık, and the brother of Ozan.
Sacit Süer	36-40 43, 45, 47, 49-54, 56-70	Hamza	
Irem Tuncer	31-64	Serra Atamanoğlu	She is the daughter of Fatih and Elif, and she is Selin's sister.
Selin Kahraman	16-48	Zeliș Gülsoy/Yenersoy	She is Ilknur's daughter and Ozan's ex-wife.
Ömer Karanlik	4-7, 9-11, 14-46	Osman	
Aras Aydın	11-38	Behram Dicleli	He is Mualla's son and Oylum's ex-husband.
Burak Açar	1-35	Mesut	He is Ozan's best friend.
Defne Samyeli	12-31	Elmas Heves	She was Güzide's lawyer în the divorce proceedings against Tarık and is Oltan's ex-girlfriend.
Merve Altınkaya	1-14	Burcu	
Batuhan Sel	1-14	Tim	
Hatice Deniz	1-11	Lara	

== Episodes ==
Season	Number of episodes	Director	Screenwriter	Original release date		
Season	Number of episodes	Director	Screenwriter	Start date	End date	Channel
1	35	Murat Saraçoğlu	Yıldız Tunç	September 22, 2022	June 15, 2023	ATV
2	36	Murat Saraçoğlu	Yıldız Tunç	September 7, 2023	June 6, 2024	ATV

== International publication ==
=== Representation in other countries ===
Country	The channel(s)	Release date	Name
Ethiopia	Kana TV	14 March 2024, Ongoing	Anqets (አንቀፅ)
Chile	Chilevision	18 March 2024, Ongoing	La Traición
Iran	GEM TV	21 April 2024, Ongoing	Khanum Ghazi (خانوم قاضی)
Kazakhstan	Qazaqstan TV	9 October 2023, January 2024 (Season 1)	Алданған арман
Croatia	Nova TV	26 June 2023, September 2023 (Season 1)	Dvostruki život
Serbia	Prva TV	6 May 2024, Ongoing	Izdaja
Hungary	Izaura TV	17 September 2024, Ongoing	Megtévesztve
Ukraine	Бігуді	5 November 2024, Ongoing	Зрада
Italy	Canale 5	1 December 2024 (Season 1), April 2025 (Season 2), Ongoing	Tradimento
