= Hikmet Temel Akarsu =

Turkish novelist

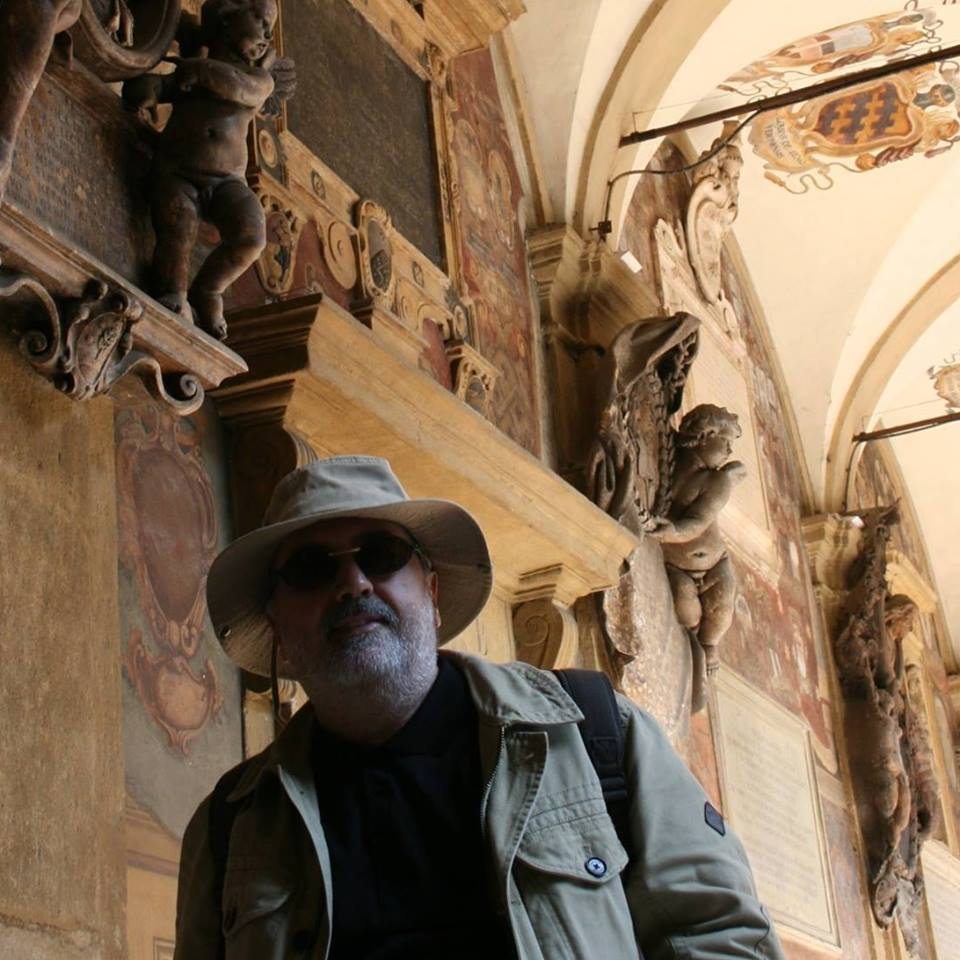
- Born: 1960 (age 65–66); Gümüşhane, Turkey
- Education: Istanbul Technical University

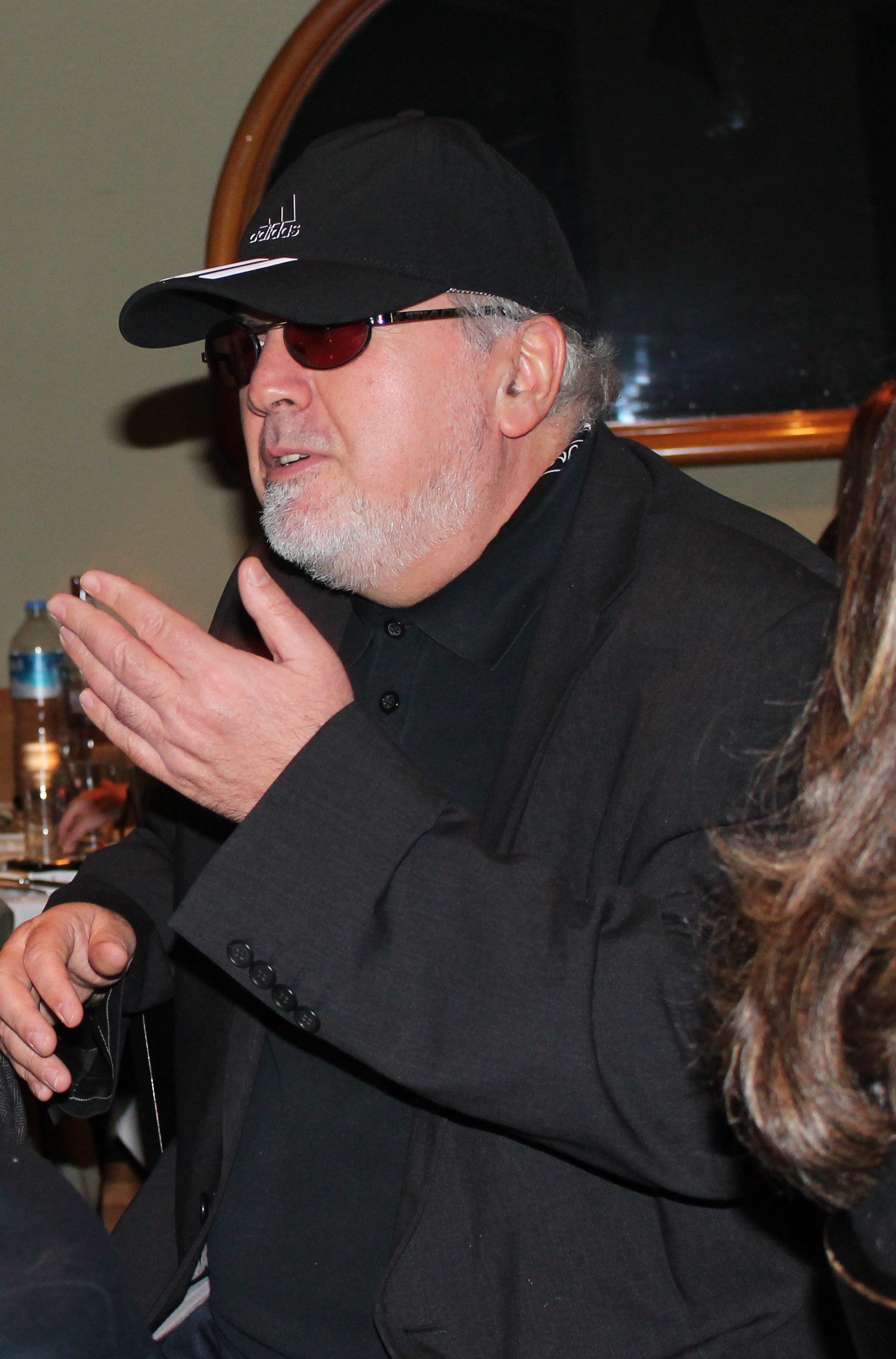
Hikmet Temel Akarsu

Hikmet Temel Akarsu (born 1960) is a Turkish novelist, short story writer, satirist and playwright.

== Biography ==
Hikmet Temel Akarsu was born in 1960 in Gümüşhane, Turkey. He moved to Istanbul with his family at the age of nine. After graduating from Istanbul Technical University with a degree in architecture, he devoted himself to writing. Including essays, articles, critiques, plays and scenarios, he produced literary work in all fields. Besides his novel series, his satirical prose and critical essays met with much acclaim.

His novel series, The Lost Generation (Kayıp Kuşak), Istanbul Quartet (İstanbul Dörtlüsü) and Everlasting Antiquity (Ölümsüz Antikite) have all been printed by several publishers.

His essays appeared in literature magazines such as Varlık, Gösteri, Radikal Kitap, Cumhuriyet Kitap, Notos, Sıcak Nal, Roman Kahramanları and Yasakmeyve. He wrote columns in newspapers for a certain period of time. His short stories were printed by İnkılap Yayınları under the title Babalar ve Kızları ("Fathers and Their Daughters") in 2005.

His "Barbaric Banquets of Poets" (Şairlerin Barbar Sofraları) is a guide for the curious, about depths of literature and the inner world of poets. "Barbaric Banquets of Poets" strongly paints the desperation, futility and the sadness felt by poets, as the modern day gathering places of poets, taverns, pubs, alehouses and tea gardens increasingly fall from grace in contrast with public tradition.

His radio play, Çalınan Tez (Stolen Thesis) received an award from the Turkish Radio and Television Corporation (TRT). Furthermore, he ventured into juvenile fiction with his Güzelçamlı'nın Kayıp Panteri (Güzelçamlı’s Lost Panther) which was published in 2006 by Can Yayınları. His radio play “Taşhan” was aired on TRT 1 between July 14–22, 2006. Antalya State Theater started to stage his adapted play from Ömer Seyfettin; Asilzadeler (Noblemen) in the 2008–2009 season.

He is a member of the Pen Club, the Turkish Writers Syndicate and the Turkish Chamber of Architecture.

== Works ==
=== Novels ===
- Aleladelik Çağı (Roman) - Kayıp Kuşak 1 (İnkılap Yayınları) (1989) / (The Age of the Ordinary - Lost Generation 1)
- Çaresiz Zamanlar (Roman) - Kayıp Kuşak 2 (İnkılap Yayınları)(1992) / (Desperate Times - Lost Generation 2)
- Yeniklerin Aşkı (Roman) - Kayıp Kuşak 3 (İnkılap yayınları)(1991) / (Love of the Defeated - Lost Generation 3)
- Sevgili Superi (Roman) - Kayıp Kuşak 4 (İnkılap Yayınları) (1988) / (Dear Superi - Lost Generation 4)
- Kaybedenlerin Öyküsü - İstanbul Dörtlüsü 1 (İnkılap Yayınları) (1998) / (Losers' Tale - Istanbul Quartet 1)
- İngiliz - İstanbul Dörtlüsü 2 (İnkılap Yayınları)(1999) / (The Englishman - Istanbul Quartet 2)
- Küçük Şeytan - İstanbul Dörtlüsü 3 (İnkılap Yayınları)(1999) / (Little Devil - Istanbul Quartet 3)
- Media - İstanbul Dörtlüsü 4 (İnkılap Yayınları)(2000) / (Media - Istanbul Quartet 4)
- Aseksüel Koloni ya da Antiope - Ölümsüz Antikite 1 (Telos)(2002) / (Asexual Colony or Antiope - Everlasting Antiquity 1)
- Siber Tragedya ya da İphigeneia - Ölümsüz Antikite 2 (Telos)(2003) / (Cyber Tragedy or Iphigeneia - Everlasting Antiquity 2)
- Casus Belli ya da Helena - Ölümsüz Antikite 3 (Telos)(2003) / (Casus Belli or Helen - Everlasting Antiquity 3)
- Özgürlerin Kaderi - Roman (Nefti Yayıncılık) (2008) / (Fate of the Free)
- Nihilist (Reddedilenlerin Risaleleri) - Roman (Doğan Kitap) (2010) / (Nihilist - The Codices of the Rejected)
- Konstantinopolis Kapılarında - Roman (Doğan Kitap) (2012) / (At the Gates of Constantinople)

=== Collections of short stories ===
- Babalar ve Kızları - Öykü (İnkılap Yayınları) (2005) / (Fathers and Their Daughters)
- Dekadans Geceleri - Öykü (Varlık Yayınları) (2008) / (Nights of Decadence)
- Şairlerin Barbar Sofraları (ve Diğer Öyküler) - Öykü - (Doğan Kitap) (2013) / (Barbaric Banquets of Poets and Other Stories)
- Bir Buruk İstanbul (Duygusal Kentler:1) - Öykü - (Metinlerarası Kitap) (2026) / (A Bittersweet İstanbul (Emotional Cities:1))
- Yorgun Flanör (Duygusal Kentler:2) - Öykü - (Metinlerarası Kitap) (2026) / (Weary Flaneur (Emotional Cities:2))
- Siesta Kumsalları (Duygusal Kentler:3) (Öykü) - (Metinlerarası Kitap) (2026) / (Siesta Beaches (Emotional Cities:3))

=== Novellas ===
- Symi'de Aşk (Emotional Journeys: 1) (Novella) (1984 Yayınevi) (2017) / (Love in Symi)
- Sozopol'de Sonyaz (Emotional Journeys: 2) (Novella) (1984 Yayınevi) (2018) / (Last Autumn in Sozopol)
- Elveda Venedik (Emotional Journeys: 3) (Novella) (1984 Yayınevi) (2022) / (Farewell Venice)
- Barcelona'da Bir Gece (Emotional Journeys: 4) (Novella) (1984 Yayınevi) (2023) / (A Night in Barcelona)

=== Essays, treatises, memoirs ===
- Bağdat Caddesi (Heyamola) (2010) / (Bağdat Boulevard)
- Selanik ve Kavala Bölgesindeki Osmanlı-Türk Mimari Mirası (Kültür Köprüleri 1) (Nevnihal Erdoğan, Seda Kaplan, Meltem Ezel Çırpı ile birlikte) (KÜV - Kocaeli Üniversitesi Vakfı Yayınları) / (Ottoman-Turkish Architectural Heritage in the Thessaloniki and Kavala Region - Cultural Bridges 1)
- Üsküp ve Ohri Bölgesindeki Osmanlı-Türk Mimari Mirası (Kültür Köprüleri 2) (Nevnihal Erdoğan ve Belma Alik ile birlikte) (KÜV - Kocaeli Üniversitesi Vakfı Yayınları) / (Ottoman-Turkish Architectural Heritage in the Skopje and Ohri Region - Cultural Bridges 2)
- Edebiyatta Mimarlık (Nevnihal Erdoğan ile birlikte) (YEM Yayın) (2016) / (Architecture in Literature)
- Gelenekten Cittaslow'a Taraklı (Nevnihal Erdoğan’la birlikte) (Verita Kitap) (2018) / (From Traditional to Cittaslow: Taraklı)
- Mimar Gözüyle Gelibolu (Nevnihal Erdoğan’la birlikte) (Verita Kitap) (2019) / (Gallipoli Through the Eyes of an Architect)
- Sinemada Mimarlık (Nevnihal Erdoğan ve Türkiz Özbursalı ile birlikte) (2020) / (Architecture in Cinema)
- Çağdaş Türk Edebiyatında Mimarlık (Nevnihal Erdoğan ve Türkiz Özbursalı ile birlikte) (2021) /(Architecture in Contemporary Turkish Literature)
- Çağdaş Dünya Edebiyatında Mimarlık (Nevnihal Erdoğan ve Türkiz Özbursalı ile birlikte) (2021) /(Architecture in Contemporary World Literature)
- Edebiyatta Denizcilik / Denizcilikte Edebiyat (Emre Karacaoğlu ile birlikte) (2022) (Literature in Maritime / Maritime in Literature) (Naviga Yayınları)
- Edebiyatta Hukuk (Fırat Pürselim-Rana Hima-Sabri Kuşkonmaz-Türkiz Özbursalı-Fuat Sevimay'la birlikte) (2023) (Law in Literature) (Papirus Yayınları)
- Matem Güncesi (Anı) (2023) (Diary of Lament) (Verita/Küçük Yayıncı)
- Felsefede Mimarlık (Nevnihal Erdoğan’la birlikte) (YEM Yayın) (2025) / (Architecture in Philosophy)
- Opera ve Balede Mimarlık (Nevnihal Erdoğan ve Leyla Gafarova ile birlikte) (YEM Yayın) (2025) / (Architecture in Opera and Ballet)

=== Children's books ===
- Güzelçamlı'nın Kayıp Panteri, Gençlik Can Yayınları (2005) / (Güzelçamlı's Lost Panther - Collection of Short Stories)
- Çevreci Peri (Çevreci Peri Masalları:1) - Çizmeli Kedi Yayınları (2010) / (Green Fairy - Green Fairytales 1)
- İlham Perisi (Çevreci Peri Masalları:2) - Çizmeli Kedi Yayınları (2011) / (The Muse - Green Fairytales 2)
- Uzaylı Peri (Çevreci Peri Masalları:3) - Çizmeli Kedi Yayınları (2011) / (Extraterrestrial Fairy - Green Fairytales 3)
- Çevreci Dede: Yaklaşan Tehlike (Roman) - Doğan-Egmont Yayınları (2013) / (Environmentalist Grandpa: Imminent Danger)
- Sultan Peri (Çevreci Peri Masalları:4) - Çizmeli Kedi Yayınları (2013) / (Sultan Fairy - Green Fairytales 4)
- Şapşal Şirinler Olimpiyat Yolunda (Öykü) - Çizmeli Kedi Yayınları (2014) / (Goofy Cuties on the way to the Olympics)
- Çevreci Dede 2: Kış Oyunları (Roman) - Doğan-Egmont Yayınları (2014) / (Environmentalist Grandpa 2: Winter Games)
- Birleşmiş Melekler (Öykü) - Çizmeli Kedi Yayınları (2016) / (United Fairies)
- Çevreci Dede 3: Çocuklar Dünyayı Kurtarabilir (Roman - Doğan-Egmont Yayınları (2016) / (Environmentalist Grandpa 3: Children Can Save the World)

=== Dramas in repertoire ===
- Yazar Ajanı – Oyun (3 Perde) (Devlet Tiyatroları) / (Writer Agent)
- Asilzadeler – Oyun (3 Perde) (Ömer Seyfettin'den Uyarlama) (Devlet Tiyatroları) / (Noblemen (Adaptation from Ömer Seyfettin))
- Ekodekalog - Oyun (3 Perde) (Devlet Tiyatroları) / (Ekodekalog)
- Osmanlı Sefiri - Oyun (3 Perde) (Devlet Tiyatroları) / (Ottoman Ambassador)
- Çevreci Dede - Çocuk Oyunu (3 Perde) (Devlet Tiyatroları) / (Environmentalist Grandpa)
- Çariçenin Fendi - Oyun (3 Perde) (Devlet Tiyatroları) / (Czarina's Trickery)
- Malazgirt: Özgürlerin Kaderi - Oyun (4 Perde) (Devlet Tiyatroları) / (Manzikert: Fate of the Free)
- Yurtdışı Sevdası - Oyun (4 Perde) (Devlet Tiyatroları) / (Adoration for Abroad)
- Taşhan – Oyun (4 Perde) (Devlet Tiyatroları) / (Taşhan)
- Tarihçiler - Tragedya (3 Perde) (Teolojik Dörtlü:1) (Devlet Tiyatroları) / (Historians - Theological Quartet:1)
- Vandallar - Tragedya (3 Perde) (Teolojik Dörtlü:2) (Devlet Tiyatroları) / (Vandals - Theological Quartet:2)
- Ruhbanlar - Tragedya (3 Perde) (Teolojik Dörtlü:3) (Devlet Tiyatroları) / (The Clergy - Theological Quartet:3)
- Müridler - Tragedya (3 Perde) (Teolojik Dörtlü:4) (Devlet Tiyatroları) / (The Disciples - Theological Quartet:4)
- Yanarım Aşkın Oduna Düşüben - Müzikal (4 Perde) (Devlet Tiyatroları) /
- Özgürlük Başka Yerde - Oyun (2 Perde) (Devlet Tiyatroları) / (Freedom is Elsewhere)
- Felekleri Temaşa - Müzikal Oyun (3 Perde) (Devlet Tiyatroları)

=== Radio dramas ===
- Çalınan Tez – Radyo Oyunu (TRT) / (Stolen Thesis)
- Taşhan – Arkası Yarın (TRT) / (Taşhan)
- Yurtdışı Sevdası - Arkası Yarın (TRT) / (Adoration for Abroad)

=== Published dramas ===
- Osmanlı Sefiri – Müzikal Komedi (Bütün Oyunları:1) (Küçük Yayıncı)(2016) / (Ottoman Ambassador)
- Çariçenin Fendi – Tarihsel Komedi (Bütün Oyunları:2) (Küçük Yayıncı)(2017) / (Czarina's Trickery)
- Yunus Emre: Yanarım Aşkın Oduna Düşüben – Müzikal Oyun (Bütün Oyunları:3) (Küçük Yayıncı)(2017)
- Malazgirt: Özgürlerin Kaderi – Tarihi Oyun (Bütün Oyunları:4) (Küçük Yayıncı) (2017) / (Manzikert: Fate of the Free)
- Teolojik Dörtlü – Tragedyalar (Tarihçiler-Vandallar-Ruhbanlar-Müridler) (Bütün Oyunları:5) (2018) / (Theological Quartet)
- Rant Rezidans – Oyunlar (Yazar Ajanı- Ekodekalog – Rant Rezidans) (Bütün Oyunları:6) Küçük Yayıncı (2019) / (Annuity Residence)
- Yurtdışı Sevdası – Oyunlar (Yurtdışı Sevdası – Taşhan – Özgürlük Başka Yerde) (Bütün Oyunları:7) Küçük Yayıncı (2019) / (Adoration for Abroad)
- Felekleri Temaşa - Müzikal Oyun (Bütün Oyunları:8) Küçük Yayıncı (2020)

=== Works translated into English ===
- Losers’ Tale – Rock’n Novel (Çeviri: Emre Karacaoğlu) (Özgün İsim: Kaybedenlerin Öyküsü) (Amazon Kindle Book)
- Full Moon Party – Short Story (Çeviri: Emre Karacaoğlu) (Özgün İsim: Dolunay Partisi) (Amazon Kindle Book)
- West End Girls – Short Story (Çeviri: Emre Karacaoğlu) (Özgün İsim: West End Kızları) (Amazon Kindle Book)
- Cihangir At Dawn – Short Story (Çeviri: Emre Karacaoğlu) (Özgün İsim: Şafak Vakti Cihangir) (Amazon Kindle Book)
- My Canticle – Short Story (Çeviri: Emre Karacaoğlu) (Özgün İsim: Neşide’m) (Amazon Kindle Book)
- Fathers and Daughters - Short Story (Çeviri: Emre Karacaoğlu) (Özgün İsim: Babalar ve Kızları) (Amazon Kindle Book)
- Architecture in Fictional Literature: Essays on Selected Works (Bentham Books) (with Nevnihal Erdoğan)
- Love in Symi - Emotional Journeys:1 (Translated by Nefise Mandaci) (Amazon Kindle Book)
- Architecture in Contemporary Literature (Bentham Books) (2023) (with Nevnihal Erdoğan)
- Architecture in Cinema (Bentham Books) (2024) (with Nevnihal Erdoğan)
- Fall in Sozopol - Emotional Journeys:2 (Translated by Nefise Mandaci) (Amazon Kindle Book) (2024)
