= Georgios Kandilaptis =

Greek scholar, journalist and teacher

- Born: 2 October 1881; Argyropolis, Ottoman Empire
- Died: 14 January 1971 (aged 90); Alexandroupoli, Greece
- Occupations: Scholar, journalist, teacher, columnist, writer
- Awards: Order of the Phoenix

Georgios Th. Kandilaptis (Greek: Γεώργιος Κανδηλάπτης, romanized: Geórgios Kandiláptis) was a Greek scholar, journalist and teacher. He lived for 44 years in the Ottoman Empire, then later in Greece. He studied and wrote about historical, folkloric, literary, and sociological content, with his main subject being the region of Pontus.

== Biography ==
Kandilaptis was born October 23, 1881, in Argyropolis, then a city in the Ottoman Empire (now Gümüşhane, Turkey). He was the last of 4 children. His parents were Theodoros and Kiparissia (or Paresa) Kandilaptis. In 1899, after graduating from the Phrontisterion of Argyropolis, he pursued an educational career teaching from 1899 until 1914 in villages in the province of Argyropolis and Erzincan. In 1914, during World War I, he was called to join the Ottoman army, but he was declared a fugitive in the period of 1920-1922 and was exiled to Erzurum.

Later, he took part in the Population exchange between Greece and Turkey, leaving his hometown in the summer of 1924. He fled to Greece, where he settled with his family in Alexandroupoli. He took with him important historical relics of Pontic history including the Golden bulls of the Empire of Trebizond, the bones of Alexios IV of Trebizond, and several library manuscripts, saving them from destruction.

In Greece, he continued his teaching career, mostly in elementary schools in various areas of the region of Evros, until his retirement in 1951. On June 29, 1966, the Greek state honored Kandilaptis' work in letters, awarding him with a special ceremony held in Athens and the Gold cross of the Order of the Phoenix.

He died from illness on January 14, 1971, in Alexandroupoli.

=== Personal life ===
In 1908, Kandilaptis married Angeliki Louka, with whom he had seven children (four boys and three girls). One of his children was killed in action during the Greco-Italian War, Lieutenant Theodoros Kandilaptis, whose name bears Alexandroupouli's military camp.

== Writing works ==
In addition to being a teacher, Kandilaptis was a journalist and columnist from a young age, working with newspapers and magazines such as the Pharos tis Anatolis (in Trabzon), the World of Odessa, the Argonautis of Batumi, and the Paidikos Kosmos. His activity continued after he moved to Greece, publishing about 400 essays, articles, studies and literature in magazines and newspapers in Athens, Macedonia, and Western Thrace until 1969. When he died in 1971, twelve of his books had been published, and a large volume of his other work was published after 2001.
