= İhsan Oktay Anar =

Turkish writer, illustrator, literature translator and an academic (born 1960)

- Born: 1960 (age 65–66)
- Education: Ege University
- Occupations: writer, illustrator, literature translator
- Awards: Erdal Öz Literature Award

İhsan Oktay Anar (born 1960 in Yozgat, Turkey), is a Turkish writer, illustrator, literature translator and an academic.

He studied philosophy in Ege University on undergraduate (1984), graduate (1989) and doctoral levels. Anar now teaches at the same university, lecturing in antique philosophy and Greek. In 2009, he won the Erdal Öz Literature Award "for his valuable novels and original style".

Anar published his first novel, The Atlas of Misty Continents (Puslu Kıtalar Atlası) in 1995. The book was translated to a number of languages, including French, German and Hungarian, and a comic book version by caricaturist İlban Ertem was released in Spring of 2015. His novels are fantasy pieces supported by historical facts and rumors especially related to the Ottoman Empire and a narration resembling fairy tales. He is known for well developed, various and original characters and providing a philosophical basis for his fantasy plots. Supernatural elements and references to folk literature and culture are commonly seen in his works. He uses a mixture of Ottoman and folk terminology within his Turkish writings, giving references to myths and historical scriptures. A trivial fact is that each of his books have a character named "Uzun İhsan" (meaning "Ihsan the Tall"), which is in fact a reference to himself. Anar is a tall and imposing figure, with a height over six feet four.

== Works ==
Novels

- Tiamat (Tiamat) (2022)
- The Nasty Hero (Galiz Kahraman) (2014)
- Seventh Day (Yedinci Gün) (2012)
- Taciturns (Suskunlar) (2007)
- Amat (Amat) (2005)
- Tales of Afrasiab (Efrasiyab`ın Hikayeleri) (1998) - later adapted for stage
- The Book of Devices (Kitab-ül Hiyel) (1996)
- The Atlas of Misty Continents (Puslu Kıtalar Atlası) (1995)

Illustrations for Kitab-ül Hiyel

- has published articles in the former newspaper Yeni Binyıl
- has published a story in the book 1002 Gece Masalları

Academic articles published in Turkish

- Anar, İ.O., Er Efsanesinin Muhtemel Kökenleri, Seminar, 1993, P.30-44.
- Anar, İ.O., Sokrates Sorunu, Seminar. 1990. pp. 1–9.
