= Savaş Dinçel =

Turkish actor (1942–2007)

- Born: 1 April 1942; Istanbul, Turkey
- Died: 20 December 2007 (aged 65); Istanbul, Turkey
- Occupations: Actor, caricaturist

Savaş Dinçel (1 April 1942 – 20 December 2007) was a Turkish actor.

== Biography ==
Savaş Dinçel was born in 1942 in İstanbul. He studied at Koca Ragıp Paşa Primary School and İstanbul Erkek High School, before studying theatre at İstanbul Municipal Conservatory. For some time, he drew cartoons for the Günaydın paper at the Comedy Education Centre and became well known for his "Tonton' caricatures. Then he worked at the Münir Özkul Theatre, AST Theatre, YEN-AR Theatre before forming the Miyatro Vatandaş Theatre.

In 1997, he played İsmet İnönü in the film Kurtuluş directed by Ziya Öztan and 'Berber Al' in the film Ağır Roman directed by Mustafa Altıoklar. He reprised his role as İsmet İnönü again in the 1998 film Cumhuriyet. In 2000, he acted in Offside (Dar Alanda Kısa Paslaşmalar) and won 'Best Actor' awards at the 20th İstanbul Film Festival, 8th ÇASOD Film awards, and the 22nd SİYAD awards for his role as Hacı in the film. In 2002, he played Father Nusret in the series Ekmek Teknesi broadcast by ATV. In 2006, he acted in Ömer Uğur's film Eve Dönüş and continued acting and directing at the City Theatre.

On 20 December 2007, Dinçel suffered internal bleeding and died at İstanbul's Memorial Hospital.
