= Zakkum (band) =

Turkish rock group

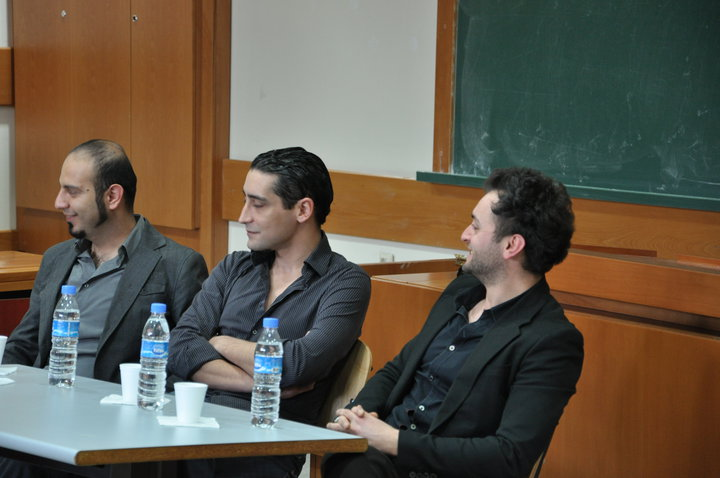
- Zakkum at a conference in April 2010

Background information
- Origin: Ankara, Turkey
- Genres: Soft rock; pop rock; alternative rock
- Years active: 1999–present
- Labels: Orta Dünya; DMC
- Members: Yusuf Demirkol; Emre Yılmaztürk; Eren Parlakgümüş; Cem Senyücel
- Website: www.zakkumonline.com

Zakkum are a Turkish rock group. It was created in 1999 under the name Raindog in Ankara. Raindog had many stage performances, before they started working on an album and chose a Turkish name "Zakkum" for their band.

== Career ==
The group dates back to 1998. Cem Senyücel, Yusuf Demirkol and Eren Parlakgümüş were each following their solo music career until they were brought together with the idea of forming a group. They initially started to perform at Sinema Bar and subsequently appeared on stage in many other places. Emre Yılmaztürk joined as the fourth and last member in 2003.

Until 2004, they primarily performed and covered the works of Placebo, Radiohead, Morrissey, The Smiths, The Cure, The Smashing Pumpkins, Suede and eventually began to release their own songs.

== Discography ==
Studio albums

- Zehr-i Zakkum (2007)
- 13 (2011)
- Ben Böyle Değildim (2012)
- Hergün Sonbahar (2013)
- Bir Gece Yarası (2016)
- Duble, Vol. 1 (2020)
- Duble, Vol. 2 (2020)

== Videography ==
- "Ah Çikolata"
- "Zehr-i Zakkum" (duet with Teoman)
- "Ahtapotlar"
- "Hipokondriyak"
- "Anlıyorsun"
- "Yüzük"
- "Anason"
- "Ahtapotlar (Akustik)"
- "Ben Böyle Değildim"
- "Teslim Ol"
- "Ben Ne Yangınlar Gördüm"
- "Her Gün Sonbahar"
- "Gidiyorum Yolcu Et"
- "Gökyüzünde"
- "Acıta Acıta"
- "Dile Kolay Kalbe Değil"
- "Al Gece Yarılarımı Benden"
- "Sen Hala Benimlesin"
- "İkimiz de Yorgunuz"
- "Hatıran Yeter"
- "Müsaade Senin" (feat. Ceylan Köse)
- "Bilemedim"
- "Güneşimi Kaybettim"
- "Gülü Susuz"
- "Elveda"
- "Hüzzam"
- "Elbet Bir Gün"
- "Kalbin Delikti"
- "Birlikte Buruşsun Ellerimiz"
- "Bütün Şarkılar Biter"
- "Seni Rastgele Sevmedim"
- "Vurulurum"
