= Cholera Street =

Cholera Street (Ağır Roman)
- Directed by: Mustafa Altıoklar
- Written by: Mustafa Altıoklar (screenplay); Metin Kaçan (novel)
- Produced by: Sabahattin Çetin; Müjde Ar; Mehmet Soyarslan
- Starring: Okan Bayülgen; Müjde Ar; Mustafa Uğurlu
- Cinematography: Ertunç Şenkay
- Music by: Attila Özdemiroğlu
- Release date: 28 November 1997
- Running time: 121 minutes
- Country: Turkey
- Language: Turkish

Cholera Street (Original Turkish title: Ağır Roman, literally meaning "Heavy Novel") is a 1997 Turkish film directed by Mustafa Altıoklar, adapted from Metin Kaçan's best selling novel Ağır Roman.

== Plot ==
The film is set in a rundown, crime ridden neighborhood of Istanbul dubbed "Cholera Street" (Kolera Sokağı). Salih is a mechanic and son of a respected barber Ali. A woman Tina arrives at Cholera street where she takes up residence and works as a prostitute. Deniz is a gangster who gives himself the nickname "Reiss" ("Chief"), tries to take control of the neighbourhood through intimidation.

After Reiss takes over a horse stable and causes the suicide of the owner, Arap Sado (a close friend of Salih) challenges Reiss to a knife duel and after defeating him, demands that he leave the neighborhood. One night, a prostitute is murdered with her genitals cut out, and this causes fears of a serial killer on the loose called the "Kolera Canavarı" ("Cholera Monster"). Sado is targeted by Reis' men in a drive by shooting and he dies in Salih's arms after giving him his prized pocket knife.

With Sado dead, Reiss opens a casino and seeks to dominate the neighbour. At the opening of Sado's bust, Salih and Reiss clash on the street, during which the public defies Reis and side with Salih. Tina invites Salih to her home that night, after which Tina and Salih become a couple. Salih gets Tina to promise that she will give up prostitution, but this causes hardship because they now have no income. The "Cholera Monster" strikes again and murders "Puma" Zehra (the madame of a brothel) on Salih's watch. Reiss takes advantage of the situation, declaring himself protector of the neighborhood and turning the public against Salih.

Salih becomes suspicious after Tina returns late and confronts her about it. Tina tries to justify her returning to prostitution by saying that they needed money to survive. While Tina runs away from an angry Salih, she is attacked by the "Cholera Monster" but Salih manages save her and subdue him.

Tina's former pimp Nihat is distraught at the loss of his livelihood and his treatment at hands of Tina. He goes to Reis who takes him in and draws up a scheme to get rid of Salih. After being provoked by Reis, Nihat attacks Tina and slashes her cheek with a blade at a wedding. Salih runs him down, kills him and cuts his cheek off with a knife. The corrupt police chief who is under Reis' pay, arrests Salih and tries to force him to confess to the murder. Reis approaches Tina and makes a deal that he will get Salih released if she gives herself to him. When Salih returns home, he finds Reiss and Tina together in bed; he becomes distraught and cuts himself and bleeds to death. As an act of revenge, Tina gets into Reis' car and blows it up with Reiss and herself in it.

== Cast ==
- Okan Bayülgen - Salih
- Müjde Ar - Tina
- Mustafa Uğurlu - Reis
- Savaş Dinçel - Berber Ali
- Burak Sergen - Arap Sado
- Küçük İskender - Orhan
- Aysel Gürel - Puma Zehra
- Levent Erim - Fil Hamit
- Zafer Algöz - Gaftici Fethi
- Nilüfer Aydan - Eleni
- Sevda Ferdağ - Emine
- Zühtü Erkan - Tıbi
- Balık Ayhan - Balık Ayhan (himself)
- Naci Taşdöğen - Nihat
- Emrah Kolukısa - Reco
- Yeşim Tan - Leyla
- Osman Çağlar - Poğaçacı Piyale
- İlhan Kilimci - Tornacı
- Hülya Karakaş - Malbuşçu

== Awards ==
Ağır Roman won 3 awards at the 35th Antalya Film Festival: "Best Supporting Actor" (Mustafa Uğurlu), "Best Supporting Actress" (Sevda Ferdağ) and "Best Art Director" (Mustafa Ziya Ülkenciler). Additionally, Okan Bayülgen was awarded "Best Actor" at the 3rd Sadri Alışık awards.
