= Feyza Sevil Güngör =

Turkish actress (born 1997)

- Born: Feyza Sevil Güngör; 30 March 1997 (age 29); Ankara, Turkey
- Education: Istanbul University of Commerce (psychology)
- Occupation: Actress
- Years active: 2019–present

Feyza Sevil Güngör (born 30 March 1997) is a Turkish actress.

== Biography ==
Born in 1997 in Ankara, Turkey, Feyza Sevil Güngör is the only daughter of Demet and Giyasettin Güngör. After graduating from high school, she enrolled in the Faculty of Psychology at Istanbul University of Commerce, where she earned a bachelor's degree. In addition to Turkish, she speaks fluent English and German. She subsequently honed her artistic skills by attending professional acting and dubbing courses at Dialog Anlatım İletişim.

From 2019 to 2021, she made her acting debut in the television series Savaşçı. In 2021, she played the role of Nilsu in an episode of the series Çember, that of İlayda in the series Misafir, and that of Hera in the historical series Kuruluş: Osman. From 2022 to 2024, she landed the lead role of Oylum Yenersoy in the series Aldatmak. In 2025, she played the role of Nilüfer in the series Vicdansiz.

== Filmography ==
=== Television ===
Year	Title	Role	Network	Notes
2019–2021	Savaşçı	Ayça Kutalmış	Fox	33 episodes
2021	Çember	Nilsu	Kanal D	
2021	Misafir	İlayda	Fox	4 episodes
2021	Kuruluş: Osman	Hera	ATV	1 episode
2022–2024	Aldatmak	Oylum Yenersoy	ATV	71 episodes

=== Web series ===
Year	Title	Role	Platform
2025	Vicdansiz	Nilüfer	beIN CONNECT
