= Mustafa Altıoklar =

Turkish film director, producer and screenwriter

Mustafa Altıoklar (born 1958) is a Turkish film director, producer and screenwriter. He is the chairman of the Turkish Film Directors Association and is fluent in English. Although he graduated from the medical faculty of Istanbul University and specialised in physiotherapy, he decided to pursue a career as a director, especially after the success of his short film The Scar.

== Filmography ==
- 1988 - Lapsus
- 1988 - Ayak Sesleri (Tramping of Feet)
- 1992 - Denize Hançer Düştü (A Dagger Fell Into The Water)
- 1996 - İstanbul Kanatlarımın Altında (Istanbul Beneath My Wings)
- 1997 - Ağır Roman (Cholera Street)
- 1997 - Öldürme üzerine küçük bir film (A Short Movie on Murder)
- 1999 - Asansör (Elevator)
- 2000 - Fosforlu Cevriye
- 2003 - O Şimdi Asker (He's in the Army Now)
- 2003 - Lise Defteri (High School Notebook) (TV serials)
- 2004 - 3. Tür (3rd Species) (TV serials)
- 2004 - Çınaraltı (Beneath the Plane Tree) (TV serials)
- 2005 - Banyo (Bathroom)
- 2006 - Beyza'nın Kadınları (Shattered Soul)
