= Armenia =

Country in West Asia

Republic of Armenia Հայաստանի Հանրապետություն Hayastani Hanrapetut'yun
- Flag Coat of arms
- Anthem: Մեր Հայրենիք; Mer Hayrenik "Our Fatherland"
- Location of Armenia
- Capital and largest city: Yerevan; 40°11′N 44°31′E
- Official languages: Armenian
- Recognized languages: List: (Note: Through the European Charter for Regional or Minority Languages.): Assyrian; German; Greek; Kurdish (Note: The list recognises the language of Yazidis, as separate from Kurdish.); Russian; Ukrainian
- Ethnic groups (2022): 98.1% Armenians; 1.1% Yazidis; 0.8% other
- Religion (2022): 96.8% Christianity; 95.2% Armenian Apostolic Church; 1.6% other Christian; 0.6% no religion; 0.9% other; 1.7% unspecified
- Demonym: Armenian
- Government: Unitary parliamentary republic
  - President: Vahagn Khachaturyan
  - Prime Minister: Nikol Pashinyan
  - President of the National Assembly: Ruben Rubinyan
- Legislature: National Assembly

Formation
  - Earliest attestation: c. 520 BC
  - Independent kingdom: 189 BC
  - First Republic: 28 May 1918
  - Soviet Republic: 29 November 1920
  - Independence from the USSR: 21 September 1991
  - Current constitution: 5 July 1995

Area
  - Total: 29,743 km^{2} (11,484 sq mi) (138th)
  - Water (%): 4.71

Population
  - 2026 estimate: 3,100,100 (135th)
  - Density: 104.2/km^{2} (269.9/sq mi)
- GDP (PPP): 2026 estimate
  - Total: ▲$83.239 billion (109th)
  - Per capita: ▲$26,916 (77th)
- GDP (nominal): 2026 estimate
  - Total: ▲$32.974 billion (112th)
  - Per capita: ▲$10,662 (88th)
- Gini (2022): 27.9 low inequality
- HDI (2023): ▲0.811 very high (69th)
- Currency: Dram (֏) (AMD)
- Time zone: UTC+4 (AMT)
- Date format: dd.mm.yyyy
- Calling code: +374
- ISO 3166 code: AM
- Internet TLD: .am; .հայ

Armenia, (Note: /ɑːrˈmiːniə/ ar-MEE-nee-ə Armenian: Հայաստան, romanized: Hayastan IPA: [hɑjɑsˈtɑn]) officially the Republic of Armenia, (Note: Armenian: Հայաստանի Հանրապետություն, romanized: Hayastani Hanrapetut'yun, IPA: [hɑjɑstɑˈni hɑnɾɑpɛtutʰˈjun]) is a landlocked country in the Armenian highlands of West Asia. (Note: Armenia is widely accepted as part of West Asia geographically, although other definitions place it either fully in Europe or across Europe and Asia.) It is a part of the Caucasus region and is bordered by Turkey to the west, Georgia to the north, Azerbaijan to the east, and Iran and the Azerbaijani exclave of Nakhchivan to the south. Yerevan is the capital, largest city and financial center.

The Armenian highlands have been home to the Hayasa-Azzi, Shupria, and Nairi peoples. By at least 600 BC, an archaic form of Proto-Armenian, an Indo-European language, had diffused into the Armenian highlands. The first Armenian state of Urartu was established in 860 BC, and by the 6th century BC it was replaced by the Satrapy of Armenia. The Kingdom of Armenia reached its height under Tigranes the Great in the 1st century BC and in AD 301 became the first state in the world to adopt Christianity as its official religion. (Note: Smaller nations that have claimed a prior official adoption of Christianity include Osroene, the Silures, and San Marino. See Timeline of official adoptions of Christianity.) Armenia still recognises the Armenian Apostolic Church, the world's oldest national church, as the country's primary religious establishment. (Note: The republic has separation of church and state.) The ancient Armenian kingdom was split between the Byzantine and Sasanian Empires around the early 5th century. Under the Bagratuni dynasty, the Bagratid Kingdom of Armenia was restored in the 9th century before falling in 1045. Cilician Armenia, an Armenian principality and later a kingdom, was located on the coast of the Mediterranean Sea between the 11th and 14th centuries.

Between the 16th and 19th centuries, the traditional Armenian homeland composed of Eastern and Western Armenia was divided between the Ottoman and Persian empires, with control of various regions shifting between the two powers over time. By the 19th century, Eastern Armenia had been conquered by the Russian Empire while most of Western Armenia remained under Ottoman rule. During World War I, up to 1.5 million Armenians were systematically exterminated in the Armenian genocide. Following the Russian Revolution, the First Republic of Armenia declared independence in 1918. By 1920, the state was incorporated into the Soviet Union as the Armenian Soviet Socialist Republic. The Republic of Armenia became independent in 1991 during the dissolution of the Soviet Union.

Modern Armenia is a unitary, multi-party, democratic nation-state. It is a developing country and ranks 69th on the Human Development Index as of 2023. Its economy is primarily based on industrial output and mineral extraction. While Armenia is geographically located in the South Caucasus, it is a member of numerous European organisations, including the Organization for Security and Co-Operation in Europe, the Council of Europe, the Eastern Partnership, Eurocontrol, the Assembly of European Regions, and the European Bank for Reconstruction and Development. Armenia is a member of certain regional groups throughout Eurasia, including the Asian Development Bank, the Collective Security Treaty Organization, (Note: On 12 June 2024, Armenia announced that it would formally withdraw from the CSTO at a later unspecified date) the Eurasian Economic Union, and the Eurasian Development Bank. Armenia supported the once de facto independent Republic of Artsakh (Nagorno-Karabakh), which had seceded from Azerbaijan in 1991, until Azerbaijan reincorporated the region through a siege and military offensive in 2023.

== Etymology ==
The original native Armenian name for the country was Հայք (Hayk') after the legendary founder Hayk; however, it is currently rarely used. The contemporary name Հայաստան (Hayastan) became popular in the Middle Ages by addition of the Persian suffix -stan (place). However the origins of the name Hayastan trace back to much earlier dates and were first attested in c. 5th century in the works of Agathangelos, Faustus of Byzantium, Ghazar Parpetsi, Koryun, and Sebeos.

The name has traditionally been derived from Hayk (Հայկ), the legendary patriarch of the Armenians and a great-great-grandson of Noah, who, according to the 5th-century AD author Movsis Khorenatsi, defeated the Babylonian king Bel in 2492 BC and established his nation in the Ararat region. Further origin of the name is uncertain. It is postulated that the name Hay comes from one of the two confederated, Hittite vassal states – the Ḫayaša-Azzi (1600–1200 BC).

The exonym Armenia is attested in the Old Persian Behistun Inscription (515 BC) as Armina (𐎠𐎼𐎷𐎡𐎴). The Ancient Greek terms Ἀρμενία (Armenía) and Ἀρμένιοι (Arménioi, "Armenians") are first mentioned by Hecataeus of Miletus (c. 550 BC – c. 476 BC). Xenophon, a Greek general serving in some of the Persian expeditions, describes many aspects of Armenian village life and hospitality in around 401 BC.

Some scholars have linked the name Armenia with the Early Bronze Age state of Armani (Armanum, Armi) or the Late Bronze Age state of Arme (Shupria). These connections are inconclusive as it is not known what languages were spoken in these kingdoms. Additionally, while it is agreed that Arme was located to the immediate west of Lake Van (probably in the vicinity of Sason, and therefore in the greater Armenia region), the location of the older site of Armani is a matter of debate. Some modern researchers have placed it near modern Samsat, and have suggested it was populated, at least partially, by an early Indo-European-speaking people. It is possible that the name Armenia originates in Armini, Urartian for "inhabitant of Arme" or "Armean country". The Arme tribe of Urartian texts may have been the Urumu, who in the 12th century BC attempted to invade Assyria from the north with their allies the Mushki and the Kaskians. The Urumu apparently settled in the vicinity of Sason, lending their name to the regions of Arme and the nearby lands of Urme and Inner Urumu.

According to the histories of both Movsis Khorenatsi and Michael Chamchian, Armenia derives from the name of Aram, a lineal descendant of Hayk. In the Hebrew Bible, the Table of Nations lists Aram as the son of Shem, to whom the Book of Jubilees attests,

And for Aram there came forth the fourth portion, all the land of Mesopotamia between the Tigris and the Euphrates to the north of the Chaldees to the border of the mountains of Asshur and the land of 'Arara'.

Jubilees 8:21 also apportions the Mountains of Ararat to Shem, which Jubilees 9:5 expounds to be apportioned to Aram.

Jewish historian Flavius Josephus states in his Antiquities of the Jews,

Aram had the Aramites, which the Greeks called Syrians;... Of the four sons of Aram, Uz founded Trachonitis and Damascus: this country lies between Palestine and Celesyria. Ul founded Armenia; and Gather the Bactrians; and Mesa the Mesaneans; it is now called Charax Spasini.

== History ==
=== Prehistoric ===
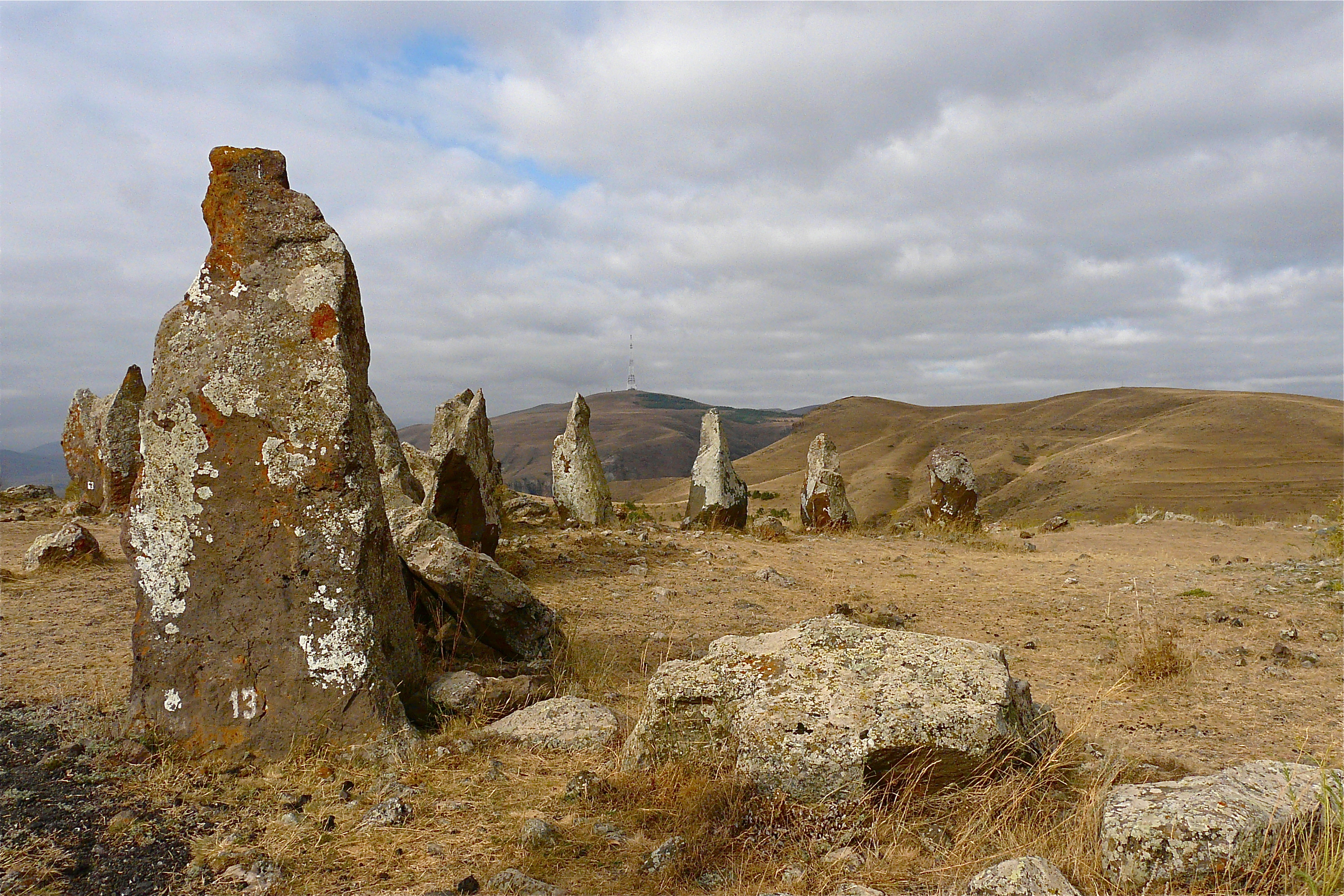
Bronze Age burial site Zorats Karer (also known as Karahunj)

The first human traces are supported by the presence of Acheulean tools, generally close to the obsidian outcrops more than 1 million years ago. The most recent and important excavation is at the Nor Geghi 1 Stone Age site in the Hrazdan river valley. Thousands of 325,000 year-old artifacts may indicate that this stage of human technological innovation occurred intermittently throughout the Old World, rather than spreading from a single point of origin (usually hypothesized to be Africa), as was previously thought.

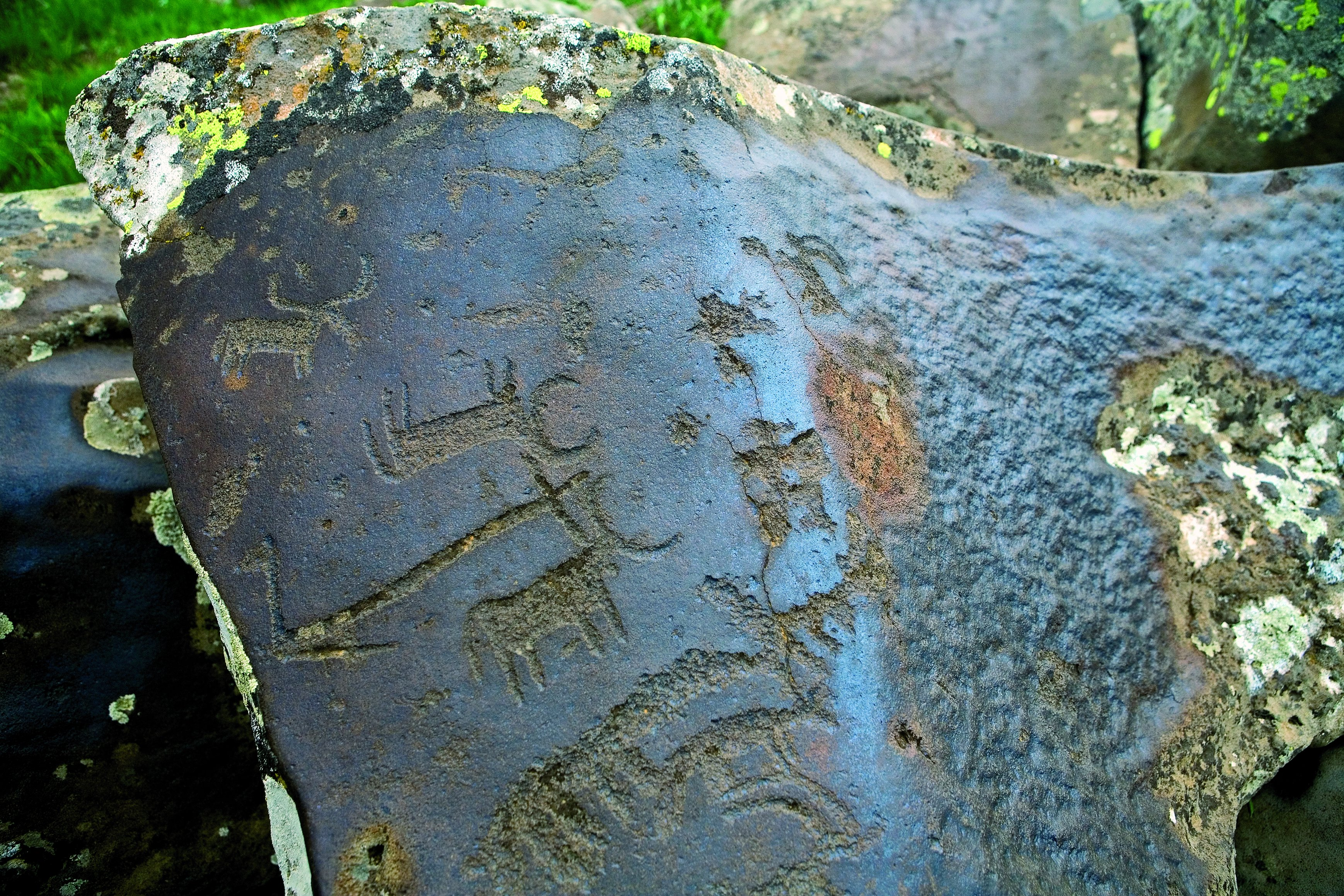
Petroglyphs with images of various animals on Mount Ughtasar

Many early Bronze Age settlements were built in Armenia (Valley of Ararat, Shengavit, Harich, Karaz, Amiranisgora, Margahovit, Garni, etc.). One of the important sites of the Early Bronze Age is Shengavit settlement. It was located on the site of today's capital of Armenia, Yerevan.

=== Antiquity ===
Historical Armenia, 150 BC

Armenia lies in the highlands surrounding the mountains of Ararat. There is evidence of an early civilisation in Armenia in the Bronze Age and earlier, dating to about 4000 BC. Archaeological surveys in 2010 and 2011 at the Areni-1 cave complex have resulted in the discovery of the world's earliest known leather shoe, skirt, and wine-producing facility.

Several Bronze Age cultures and states flourished in the area of Greater Armenia, including the Trialeti-Vanadzor culture, Hayasa-Azzi, and Mitanni (located in southwestern historical Armenia), all of which are believed to have had Indo-European populations. The Nairi confederation and its successor, Urartu, successively established their sovereignty over the Armenian Highlands. Each of the aforementioned nations and confederacies participated in the ethnogenesis of the Armenians. A large cuneiform lapidary inscription found in Yerevan established that the modern capital of Armenia was founded in the summer of 782 BC by King Argishti I. Yerevan is one of the world's oldest continuously inhabited cities.

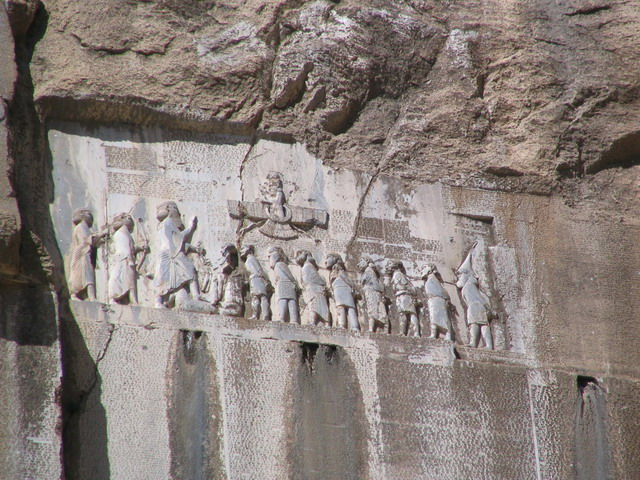
Behistun Inscription of Darius I mentioning Armenia. 6th century BC.

After the fall of the state of Urartu at the beginning of the 6th century BC, the Armenian highlands were for some time under the hegemony of the Medes, and after that they were part of the Achaemenid Empire. Armenia was part of the Achaemenid state from the second half of the 6th century BC until the second half of the 4th century BC divided into two satrapies: XIII (western part, with the capital in Melitene) and XVIII (northeastern part). During the late 6th century BC, the first geographical entity that was called Armenia by neighbouring populations was established under the Orontid dynasty.

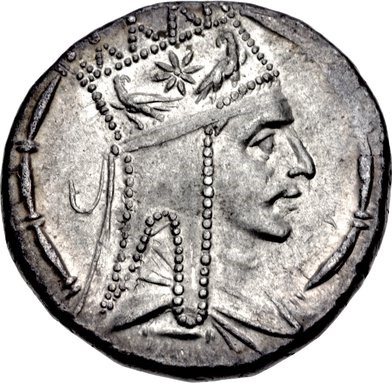
Coin of Tigranes the Great

The kingdom became fully sovereign from the sphere of influence of the Seleucid Empire in 190 BC under King Artaxias I and begun the rule of the Artaxiad dynasty. Armenia reached its height between 95 and 66 BC under Tigranes the Great, becoming the most powerful kingdom of its time east of the Roman Republic. In the next centuries, Armenia was in the Persian Empire's sphere of influence during the reign of Tiridates I, the founder of the Arsacid dynasty of Armenia, which was a branch of the Parthian Empire. Throughout its history, the kingdom of Armenia enjoyed both periods of independence and periods of autonomy subject to contemporary empires. Its strategic location between two continents has subjected it to invasions by many peoples, including Assyria (under Ashurbanipal, at around 669–627 BC, the boundaries of Assyria reached as far as Armenia and the Caucasus Mountains), Medes, Achaemenid Empire, Greeks, Parthians, Romans, Sasanian Empire, Byzantine Empire, Arabs, Seljuk Empire, Mongols, Ottoman Empire, the successive Safavid, Afsharid, and Qajar dynasties of Iran, and the Russians.

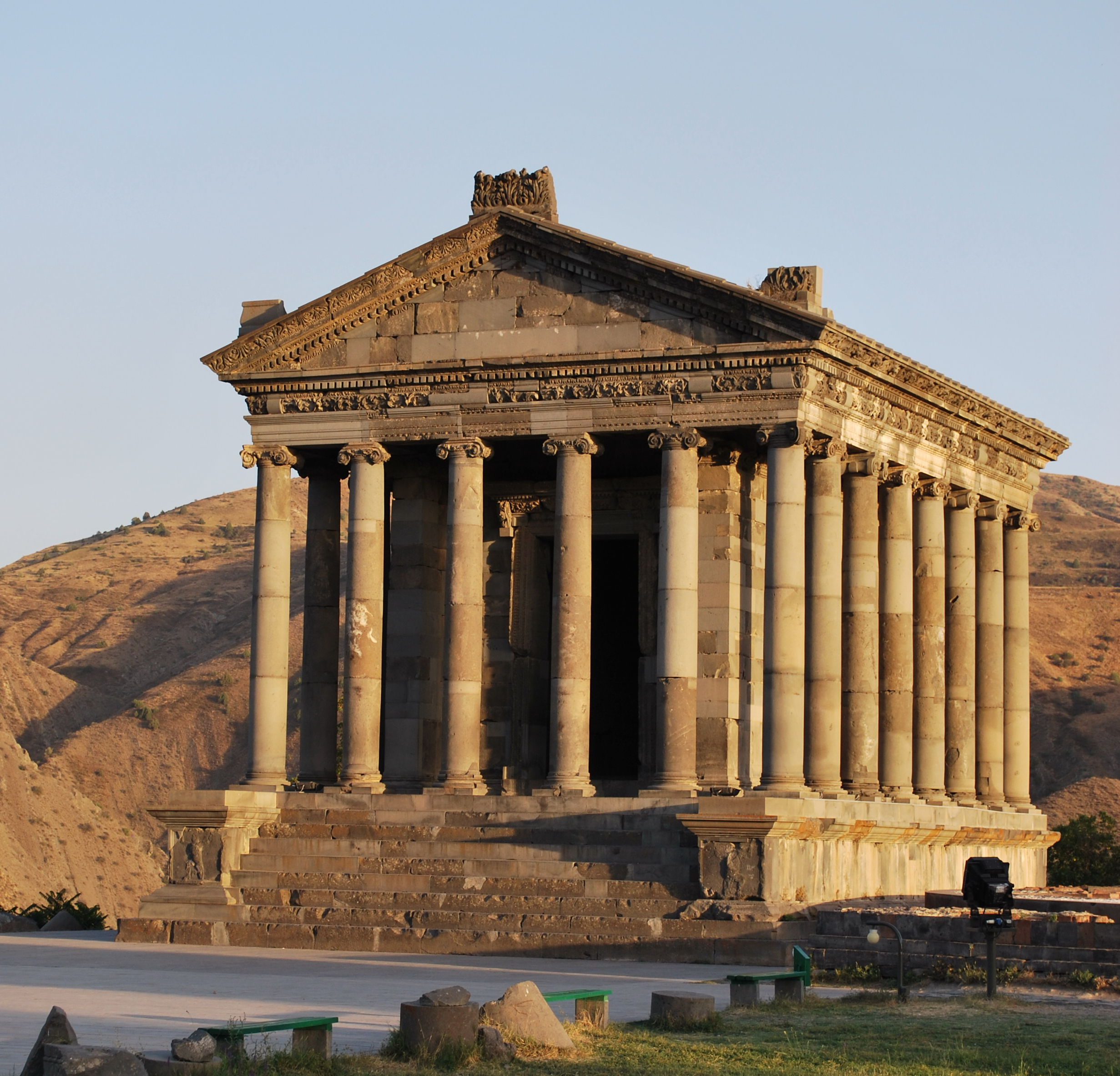
The pagan Garni Temple, probably built in the first century, is the only "Greco-Roman colonnaded building" in the post-Soviet space.

Religion in ancient Armenia was historically related to a set of beliefs that, in Persia, led to the emergence of Zoroastrianism. It particularly focused on the worship of Mithra and also included a pantheon of gods such as Aramazd, Vahagn, Anahit, and Astghik. The country used the solar Armenian calendar, which consisted of 12 months.

Christianity first appeared in Armenia in the 1st century AD, with the arrival of two of Jesus's twelve apostles – Thaddaeus and Bartholomew. Under the influence of Gregory the Illuminator, King Tiridates III proclaimed Christianity as the state religion in 301, partly in defiance of the Sasanian Empire. Armenia thus became the first officially Christian state. Prior to this, during the latter part of the Parthian era, Armenia was a predominantly Zoroastrian country.

Another major cornerstone of Armenian identity – the Armenian alphabet – was invented a century later by Mesrop Mashtots c. 405. After the fall of the Armenian Arsacids in 428, most of Armenia was incorporated as a marzpanate within Sasanian Persia. Following the Battle of Avarayr in 451, Christian Armenians maintained their religion, and Armenia gained autonomy in the Treaty of Nvarsak in 484.

=== Middle Ages ===
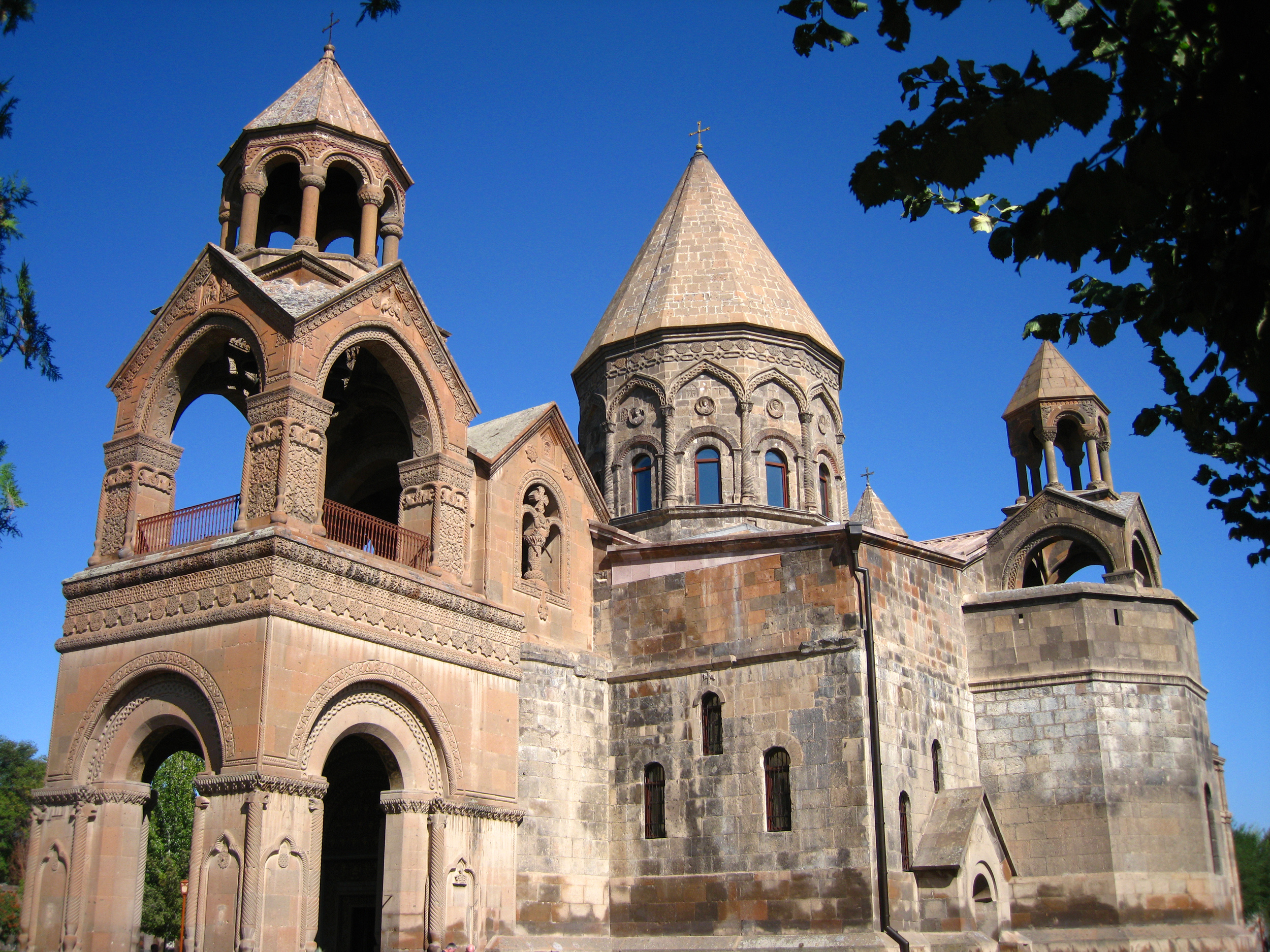
The Etchmiadzin Cathedral, Armenia's Mother Church traditionally dated 303 AD, is considered the oldest cathedral in the world.

The Sassanid Empire was conquered by the Rashidun Caliphate in the mid 7th century, reuniting Armenian lands previously taken by the Byzantine Empire, and Armenia subsequently emerged as Arminiya, an autonomous principality under the Umayyad Caliphate. The principality was ruled by the Prince of Armenia, and recognised by the Caliph and the Byzantine Emperor. It was part of the administrative division/emirate Arminiya created by the Arabs, which also included parts of Georgia and Caucasian Albania, and had its centre in the Armenian city Dvin. Arminiya lasted until 884, when it regained its independence from the weakened Abbasid Caliphate under Ashot I of Armenia.

The reemergent Armenian kingdom was ruled by the Bagratuni dynasty and lasted until 1045. In time, several areas of the Bagratid Armenia separated as independent kingdoms and principalities such as the Kingdom of Vaspurakan ruled by the House of Artsruni in the south, Kingdom of Syunik in the east, or Kingdom of Artsakh on the territory of modern Nagorno-Karabakh, while still recognising the supremacy of the Bagratid kings.

In 1045, the Byzantine Empire conquered Bagratid Armenia. Soon, the other Armenian states fell under Byzantine control as well. The Byzantine rule was short-lived, as in 1071 the Seljuk Empire defeated the Byzantines and conquered Armenia at the Battle of Manzikert. Ruben I, Prince of Armenia, went with some of his countrymen into the gorges of the Taurus Mountains and then into Tarsus of Cilicia; he was escaping death or servitude at the hands of those who had killed Gagik II, King of Ani, his relative. The Byzantine governor of the palace gave them shelter where the Armenian Kingdom of Cilicia was eventually established on 6 January 1198 under Leo I, King of Armenia, a descendant of Prince Ruben.

Cilicia was a strong ally of the European Crusaders and saw itself as a bastion of Christendom in the East. Cilicia's significance in Armenian history and statehood is also attested by the transfer of the seat of the Catholicos of the Armenian Apostolic Church, the spiritual leader of the Armenian people, to the region.

In the early 12th century, Armenian princes of the Zakarid family drove out the Seljuk Turks and established a semi-independent principality in northern and eastern Armenia known as Zakarid Armenia, which lasted under the patronage of the Georgian Kingdom. The Orbelian dynasty shared control with the Zakarids in various parts of the country, especially in Syunik and Vayots Dzor, while the House of Hasan-Jalalyan controlled provinces of Artsakh and Utik as the Kingdom of Artsakh.

=== Early modern era ===
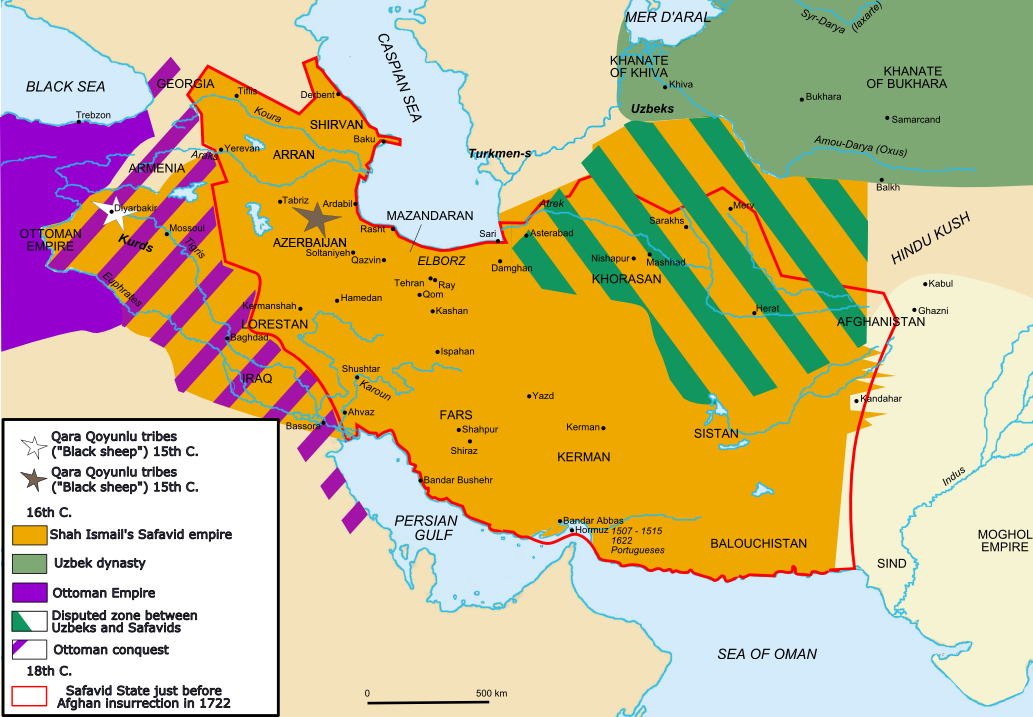
In 1501–02, most of the Eastern Armenian territories, including Yerevan, were conquered by the emerging Safavid dynasty of Iran led by Shah Ismail I.

During the 1230s, the Mongol Empire conquered Zakarid Armenia and then the remainder of Armenia. The Mongolian invasions were soon followed by those of other Central Asian tribes, such as the Kara Koyunlu, Timurid dynasty and Ağ Qoyunlu, which continued from the 13th century until the 15th century. After incessant invasions, each bringing destruction to the country, with time Armenia became weakened.

In the 16th century, the Ottoman Empire and the Safavid dynasty of Iran divided Armenia. From the early 16th century, both Western Armenia and Eastern Armenia fell to the Safavids. Owing to the century long Turco-Iranian geopolitical rivalry that would last in West Asia, significant parts of the region were frequently fought over between the two rivalling empires during the Ottoman–Persian Wars. From the mid 16th century with the Peace of Amasya, and decisively from the first half of the 17th century with the Treaty of Zuhab until the first half of the 19th century, Eastern Armenia was ruled by the successive Safavid, Afsharid and Qajar dynasties, while Western Armenia remained under Ottoman rule. From 1604, Abbas I of Iran implemented a "scorched earth" policy in the region to protect his north-western frontier against any invading Ottoman forces, a policy that involved a forced resettlement of masses of Armenians outside of their homelands.

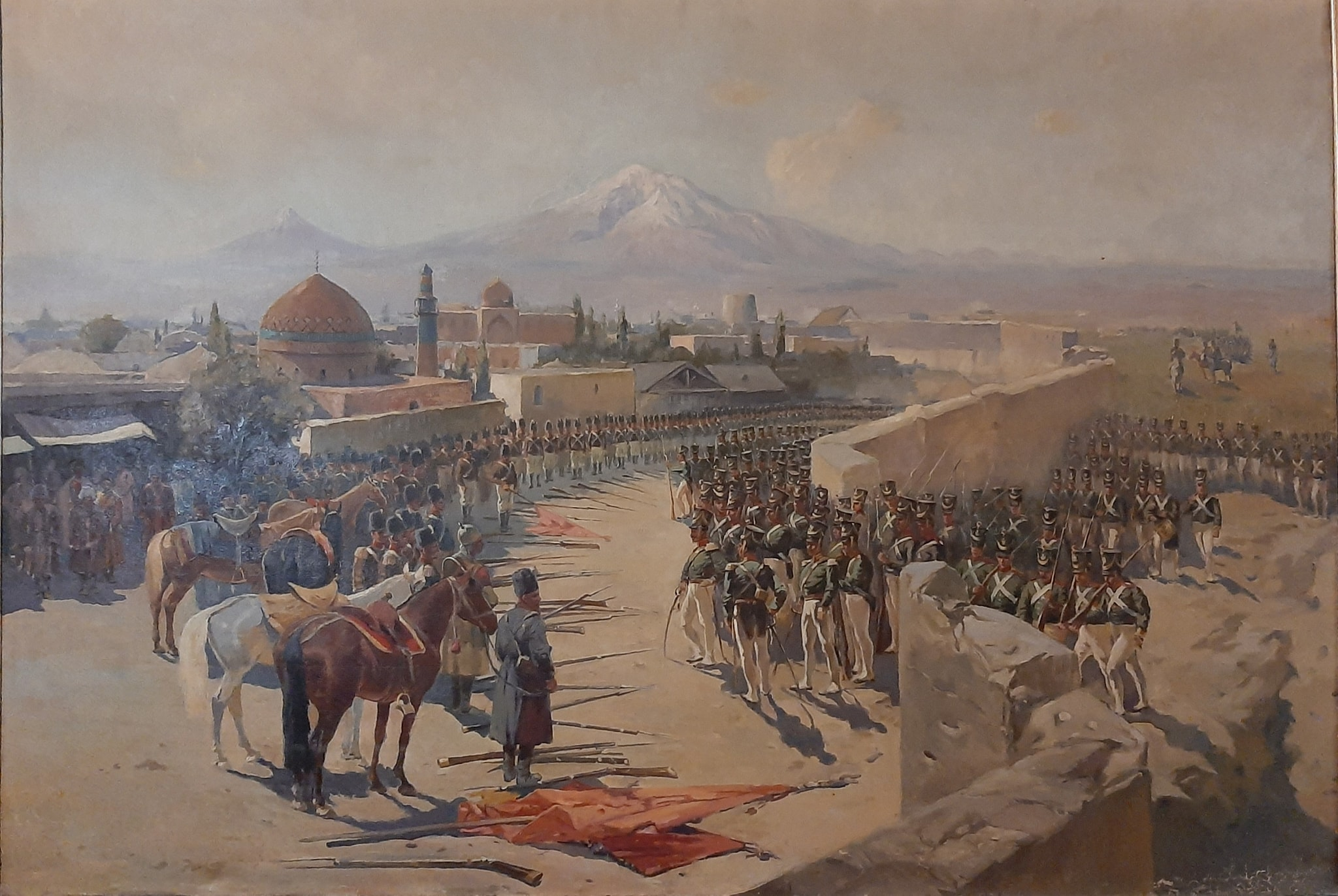
Capture of Erivan fortress by Russian troops in 1827 during the Russo-Persian War (1826–28) by Franz Roubaud

The 18th century saw the first foray of the Russian Empire into the region, with Peter the Great and his alliance with the Armenian meliks of Syunik and Artsakh during the Russo-Persian War (1722–1723). Despite the setbacks of Peter's campaign, this initial move encouraged the meliks in their resistance struggle against the Safavids and the Ottomans. However, it was not until the early 19th century that Eastern Armenia formally passed to Russian control, following the Russo-Persian War (1804–1813) and the Russo-Persian War (1826–1828). In the 1813 Treaty of Gulistan and the 1828 Treaty of Turkmenchay, Qajar Iran ceded to Russia the Karabakh, Erivan, and Nakhichevan Khanates. The Russo-Turkish War (1877–1878) resulted in further gains for Russian Armenia, notably the regions of Kars and Ardahan.

Most of Western Armenia, however, remained under Ottoman rule. Within the Ottoman millet system, Armenians lived in relative harmony with other groups, including the ruling Turks. However, as Christians under a strict Muslim social structure, Armenians faced pervasive discrimination. In response to the 1894 Sasun rebellion, Sultan Abdul Hamid II organised state-sponsored massacres against the Armenians between 1894 and 1896, resulting in close to 200,000 deaths. The Hamidian massacres, as they came to be known, gave Abdul Hamid international infamy as the "Bloody Sultan" or the "Red Sultan".

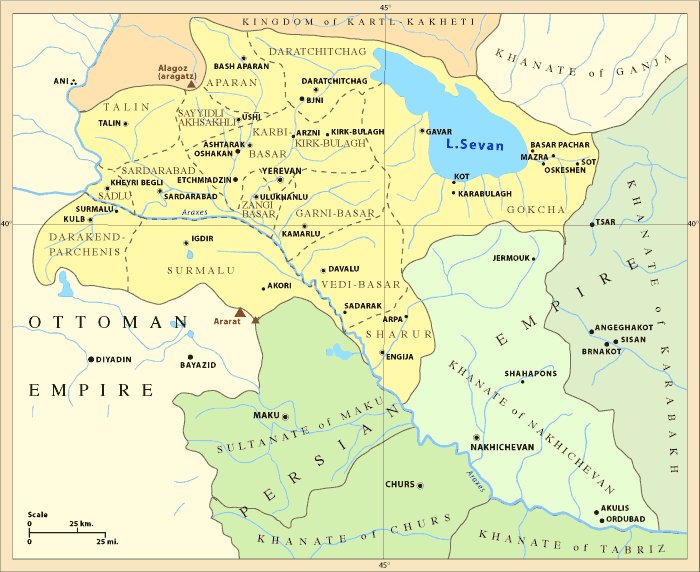
The Armenian Oblast (1828–1840) included the territory of the former Erivan (marked in yellow) and Nakhichevan (marked in light green) khanates.

During the 1890s, the Armenian Revolutionary Federation, commonly known as the Dashnaktsutyun, became active within the Ottoman Empire with the aim of unifying the various small groups in the empire that were advocating for reform and defending Armenian villages from massacres that were widespread in some of the Armenian-populated areas of the empire. Dashnaktsutyun members also formed Armenian fedayi groups that defended Armenian civilians through armed resistance. The Dashnaks also worked for the wider goal of creating a "free, independent and unified" Armenia, although they sometimes set aside this goal in favour of a more realistic approach, such as advocating autonomy.

The Ottoman Empire began to collapse, and in 1908, the Young Turk Revolution overthrew the government of Sultan Hamid. In April 1909, the Adana massacre occurred in the Adana Vilayet resulting in the deaths of as many as 20,000–30,000 Armenians. The Armenians living in the empire hoped that the Committee of Union and Progress would change their second-class status. The Armenian reform package (1914) was presented as a solution by appointing an inspector general over Armenian issues.

=== World War I and the Armenian genocide ===
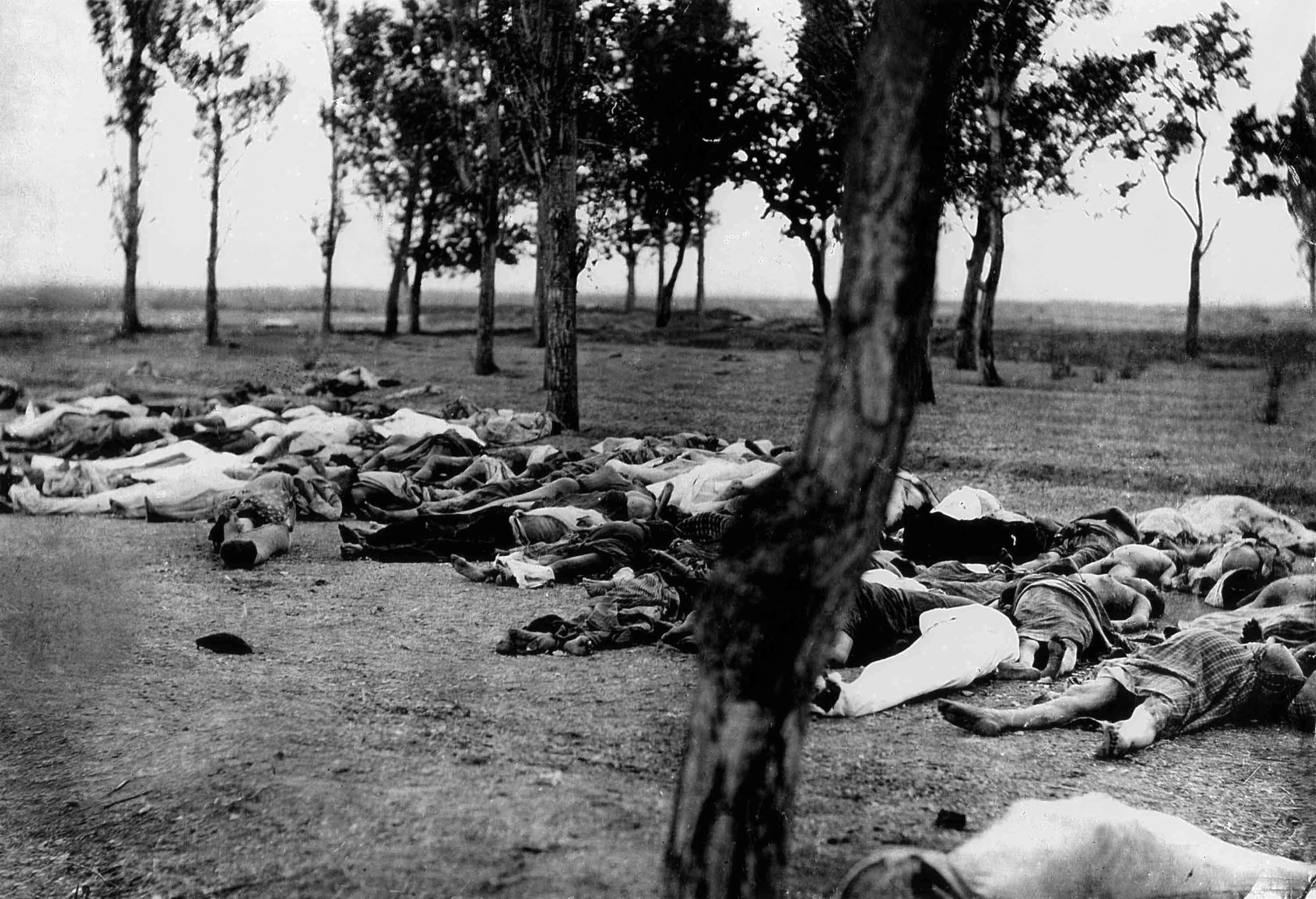
Armenian genocide victims in 1915

The outbreak of World War I led to confrontation between the Ottoman Empire and the Russian Empire in the Caucasus and Persian campaigns. The new government in Istanbul began to look on the Armenians with distrust and suspicion because the Imperial Russian Army contained a contingent of Armenian volunteers. On 24 April 1915, Armenian intellectuals were arrested by Ottoman authorities and, with the Tehcir Law (29 May 1915), eventually a large proportion of Armenians living in Anatolia perished in what has become known as the Armenian genocide.

The genocide was implemented in two phases: the wholesale killing of the able-bodied male population through massacre and subjection of army conscripts to forced labour, followed by the deportation of women, children, the elderly and infirm on death marches leading to the Syrian desert. Driven forward by military escorts, the deportees were deprived of food and water and subjected to periodic robbery, rape, and massacre. There was local Armenian resistance in the region, developed against the activities of the Ottoman Empire. The events of 1915 to 1917 are regarded by Armenians and the vast majority of Western historians to have been state-sponsored mass killings, or genocide.

Turkish authorities deny the genocide took place to this day. The Armenian genocide is acknowledged to have been one of the first modern genocides. According to the research conducted by Arnold J. Toynbee, an estimated 600,000 Armenians died during deportation from 1915 to 1916. This figure, however, accounts for solely the first year of the genocide and does not take into account those who died or were killed after the report was compiled on 24 May 1916. The International Association of Genocide Scholars places the death toll at "more than a million". The total number of people killed has been most widely estimated at between 1 and 1.5 million. Armenia and the Armenian diaspora have been campaigning for official recognition of the events as genocide for over 30 years. These events are traditionally commemorated yearly on 24 April, the Armenian Martyr Day, or the Day of the Armenian genocide.

=== First Republic of Armenia ===
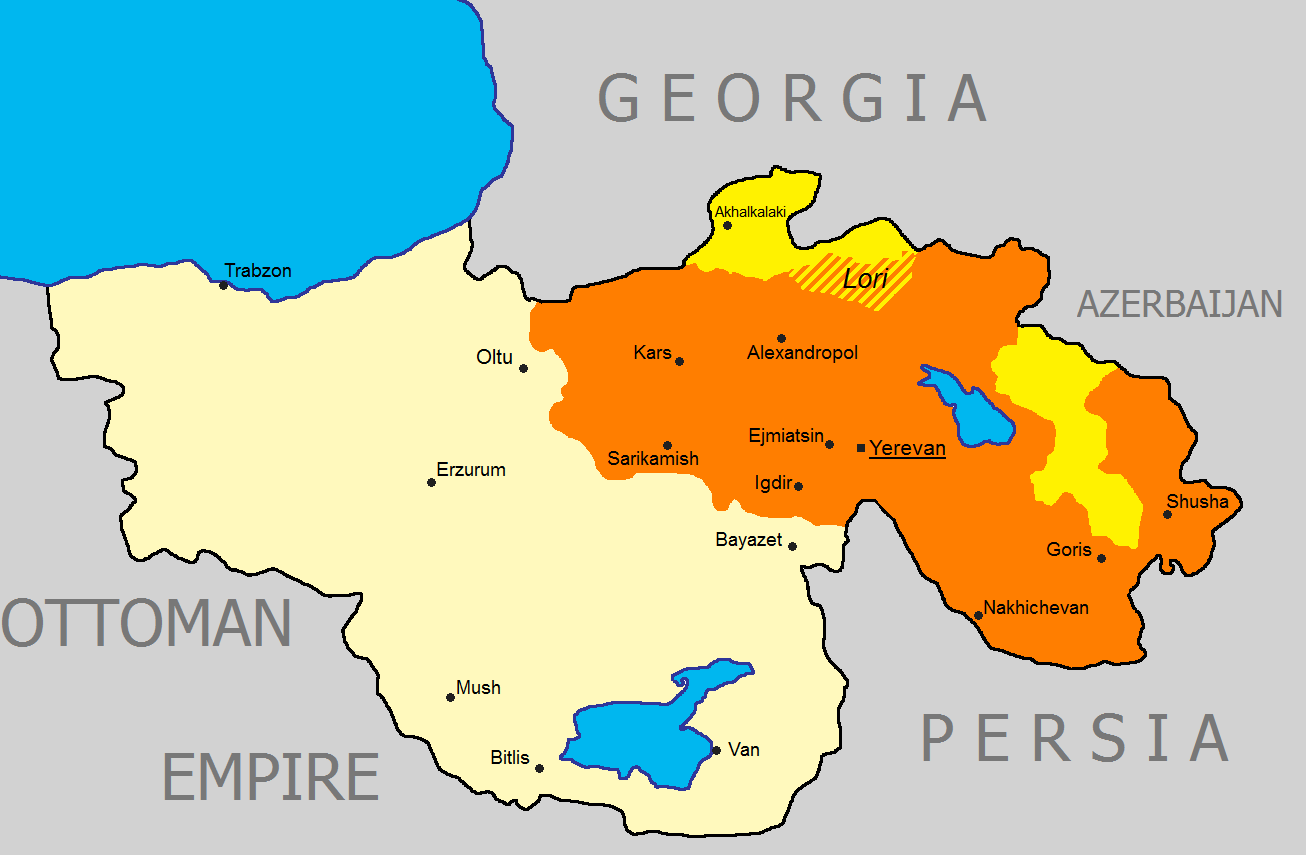
Territory held by Armenia and the Karabakh Council at some point Area given to Armenia by the Treaty of Sèvres, which was never enforced

The Imperial Russian Caucasus Army, commanded by Nikolai Yudenich, and the Armenian volunteer units, led by Andranik Ozanian and Tovmas Nazarbekian, succeeded in gaining much of Western Armenia during World War I. However, their gains were lost with the October Revolution of 1917. At the time, Russian-controlled Eastern Armenia, Georgia, and Azerbaijan attempted to bond together in the Transcaucasian Democratic Federative Republic. This federation, however, lasted from only February to May 1918, when all three parties decided to dissolve it. As a result, the Dashnak-dominated government of Eastern Armenia declared its independence on 28 May as the First Republic of Armenia under the leadership of Aram Manukian.

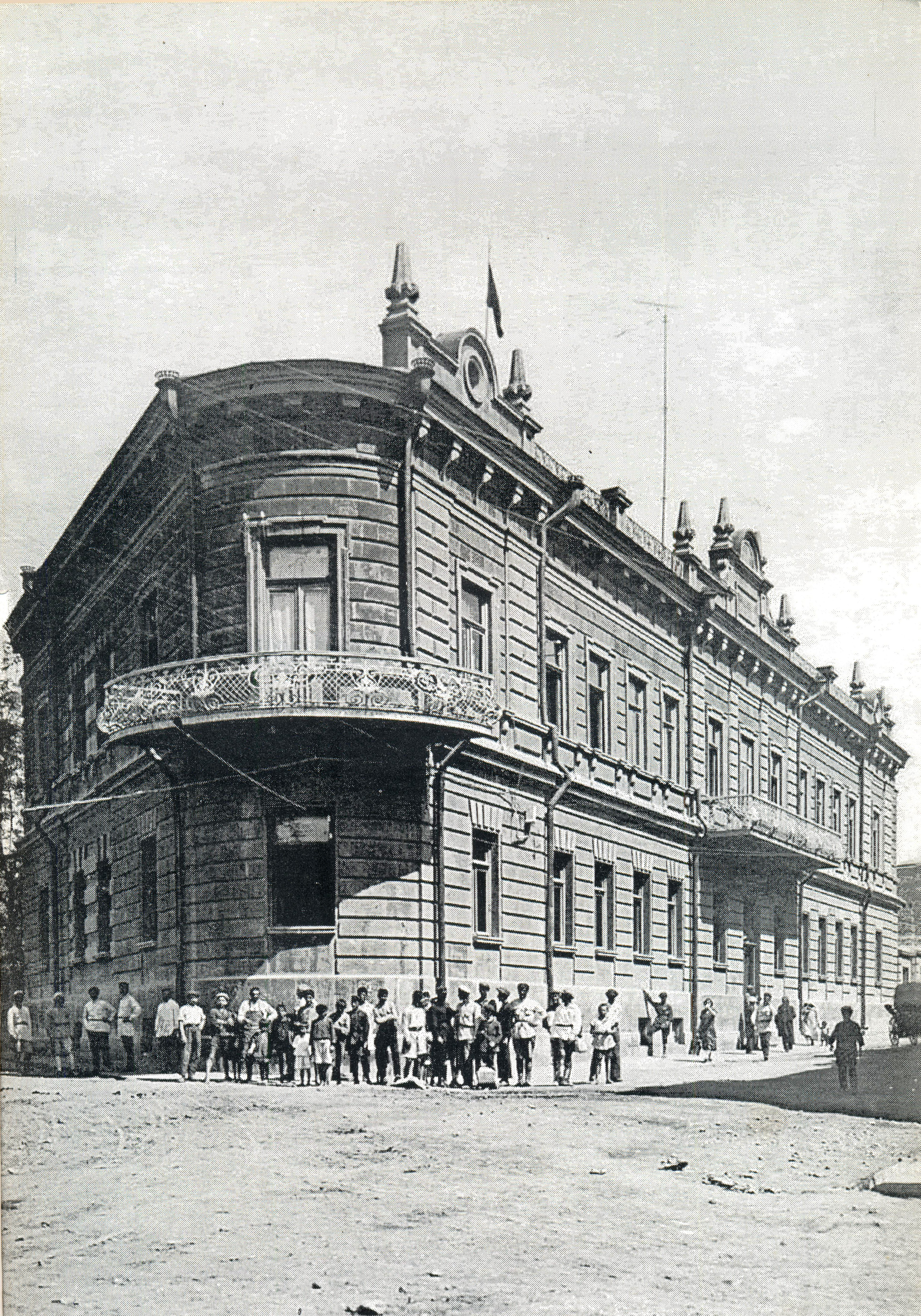
The Government house of the First Republic of Armenia (1918–1920)

The First Republic's short-lived independence was fraught with war, territorial disputes, ethnic unrest, Bolshevik rebellions, and a mass influx of refugees from Western Armenia, bringing with them disease and starvation. The Entente Powers sought to help the newly founded Armenian state through relief funds and other forms of support.

At the end of the war, the victorious powers sought to divide up the Ottoman Empire. Signed between the Allied Powers and the Ottoman Empire at Sèvres on 10 August 1920, the Treaty of Sèvres promised to maintain the existence of the Armenian republic and to attach the former territories of Western Armenia to it. Because the new borders of Armenia were to be drawn by United States President Woodrow Wilson, Western Armenia was also referred to as "Wilsonian Armenia". In addition, just days prior on 5 August, Mihran Damadian of the Armenian National Union, the de facto Armenian administration in Cilicia, declared the independence of Cilicia as an Armenian autonomous republic under French protectorate. There was even consideration of making Armenia a mandate under the protection of the United States. The treaty, however, was rejected by the Turkish National Movement and never came into effect.

In 1920, Turkish nationalist forces invaded the fledgling Armenian republic from the east. Under the command of Kâzım Karabekir, they captured the Armenian territories that Imperial Russia had annexed in 1878 and occupied Alexandropol (today Gyumri). Hostilities finally concluded with the Treaty of Alexandropol on 2 December 1920. The treaty forced Armenia to disarm most of its military forces and to cede all former Ottoman territory granted to it by the Treaty of Sèvres. Simultaneously, the 11th Red Army, led by Sergo Ordzhonikidze, invaded Armenia at Karavansarai (today Ijevan) on 29 November. By early December, Ordzhonikidze's forces entered Yerevan and the short-lived Armenian republic collapsed.

After the fall of the First Republic, the war communism policies of the new Soviet Armenian government led to the February Uprising of 1921. Following the defeat of that revolt, Armenian forces under the command of Garegin Nzhdeh established the Republic of Mountainous Armenia and continued to fight Soviet forces in the southern region of Zangezur. To end the rebellion, Soviet authorities pledged to include the Syunik Province within Armenia's borders. The Red Army soon took control of the region, driving the leaders of the revolt out of Armenia, across the Araks River into Iran on 15 July 1921.

=== Soviet Armenia ===
The state emblem of Soviet Armenia depicting Mount Ararat

==== Sovietization to Stalinism ====
Following Armenia's Sovietization, the Treaty of Alexandropol was superseded by the Treaty of Moscow and the Treaty of Kars. In these agreements, Turkey renounced its claims on Batumi to Soviet Georgia in exchange for the provinces of Kars, Ardahan, and Surmalu, all of which had been under Turkish military control since the Turkish invasion of Armenia in 1920. The territory ceded to Turkey included the medieval Armenian capital Ani and Mount Ararat, the national symbol of the Armenian people. Together with Soviet Georgia and Soviet Azerbaijan, Soviet Armenia officially entered the USSR as part of the Transcaucasian SFSR (TSFSR) in March 1922. The TSFSR later split into three separate republics in December 1936 – the Armenian SSR, the Azerbaijan SSR, and the Georgian SSR.

Vladimir Lenin, who "favored a moderate policy in Armenia," appointed Alexander Miasnikian, an experienced administrator, to oversee affairs in the republic. During the era of the New Economic Policy (NEP), Armenia enjoyed a period of stability and cultural revival within the USSR, in contrast to the turbulent years of the First Republic. However, after the death of Lenin and the rise of Joseph Stalin to the Soviet leadership, the situation changed significantly. Armenians suffered greatly during Stalin's Great Purge, with Lavrentiy Beria playing an especially conspicuous role, beginning with the death of the popular Soviet Armenian leader Aghasi Khanjian in 1936. The repressions claimed the lives of major Armenian intellectual figures like Yeghishe Charents, Axel Bakunts, and Vahan Totovents. The Armenian Church also suffered in this period, culminating in the murder of the Armenian Catholicos Khoren I, an act for which Beria is usually held responsible.

==== Great Patriotic War and post-war period ====
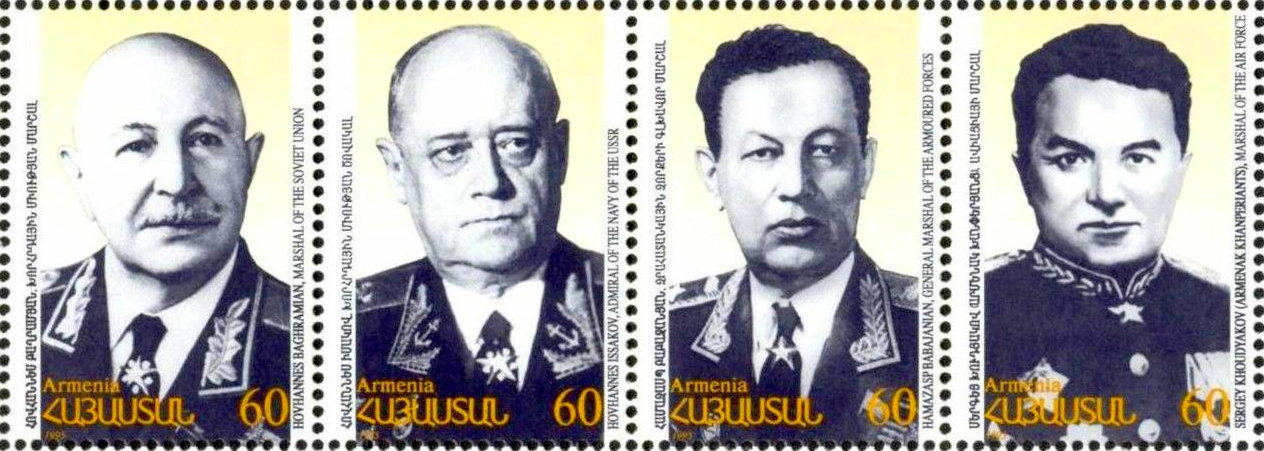
Armenian Marshals and Admiral of World War II on stamps: Bagramyan, Isakov, Babadzhanian, Khudyakov

Armenia was not the scene of any battles in the Great Patriotic War of World War II. Nevertheless, an estimated 500,000 Armenians (nearly a third of the population) served in the Red Army during the war, and 175,000 died. A total of 117 citizens of Soviet Armenia, including 10 non-Armenians, were awarded Hero of the Soviet Union. Six special military divisions were formed in Armenia in 1941–42. Five of them, the 89th, 409th, 408th, 390th, and 76th Divisions, would have a distinguished war record, while the sixth was ordered to stay in Armenia to guard the republic's western borders against a possible incursion by neighboring Turkey. The 89th Tamanyan Division, composed of ethnic Armenians, fought in the Battle of Berlin. Over 60 Armenians were promoted to the rank of general, while one attained the rank of Admiral (Ivan Isakov) and three achieved the rank of Marshal of the Soviet Union (Ivan Bagramyan, Hamazasp Babadzhanian, and Sergei Khudyakov).

After the death of Stalin in 1953, Armenia experienced a new period of liberalization under Nikita Khrushchev's Thaw. In March 1954, two years before Khrushchev denounced Stalin, his close ally, the Armenian statesman Anastas Mikoyan, flew to Yerevan and called for the rehabilitation of Charents and the republication of the writers Raphael Patkanian and Raffi. During the Thaw, life in Soviet Armenia soon began to see rapid improvement with greater investment in housing and the consumer economy. Catholicos Vazgen I, a major advocate for Armenian national interests, assumed the leadership of the Armenian Apostolic Church in 1955. In 1962, the massive statue of Stalin that towered over Yerevan was pulled down from its pedestal by troops and replaced with that of Mother Armenia in 1967. That same year, a memorial to the victims of the Armenian genocide was built at the Tsitsernakaberd hill above the Hrazdan gorge in Yerevan. This occurred after mass demonstrations took place on the tragic event's fiftieth anniversary in 1965.

==== Glasnost and perestroika ====
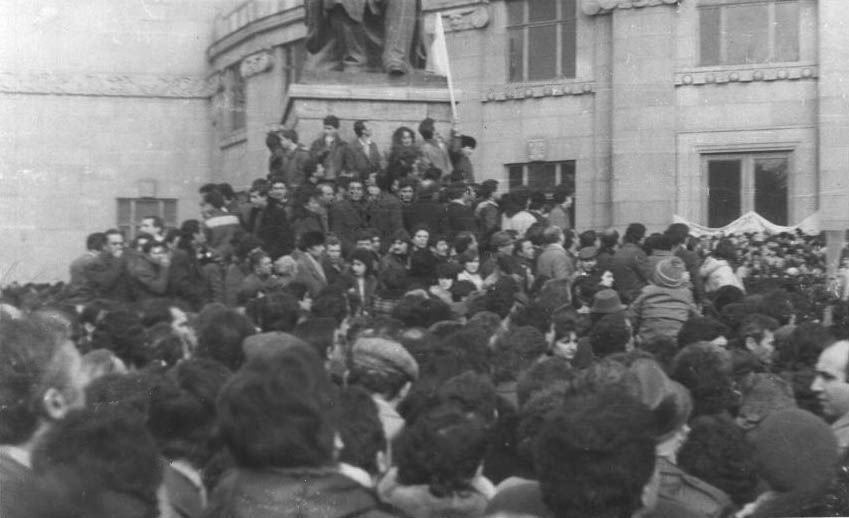
Armenians gather at Theater Square in central Yerevan to claim unification of Nagorno-Karabakh Autonomous Oblast with the Armenian SSR, 1988.

Following the Brezhnev era, Mikhail Gorbachev's reforms of glasnost and perestroika witnessed a major national revival in Armenia with the rise of the Karabakh movement. Taking advantage of the new political climate, the Armenians of the Nagorno-Karabakh Autonomous Oblast (NKAO) of Soviet Azerbaijan began to demand unification with Soviet Armenia, citing discrimination by Baku. Peaceful protests in Armenia supporting the Karabakh Armenians became common. By the beginning of 1988, nearly one million Armenians from several regions of the republic engaged in these demonstrations, centered on Yerevan's Theater Square (today Freedom Square). However, in neighboring Azerbaijan, violence against Armenians erupted in the city of Sumgait. Ethnic rioting soon broke out between Armenians and Azeris, preventing any peaceful resolution from taking place. Compounding Armenia's problems was a devastating earthquake in 1988 with a surface-wave magnitude of 6.8. Another major pogrom against Armenians in Baku in January 1990 forced almost all of the 200,000 Armenians in the Azerbaijani capital to flee to Armenia.

Gorbachev's inability to alleviate any of Armenia's problems created disillusionment among the Armenians and fed a growing hunger for independence. On 23 August 1990, Armenia declared its sovereignty on its territory. On 17 March 1991, Armenia, along with the Baltic states, Georgia and Moldova, boycotted a nationwide referendum in which 78% of all voters voted for the retention of the Soviet Union in a reformed form.

=== Post-Soviet independence ===
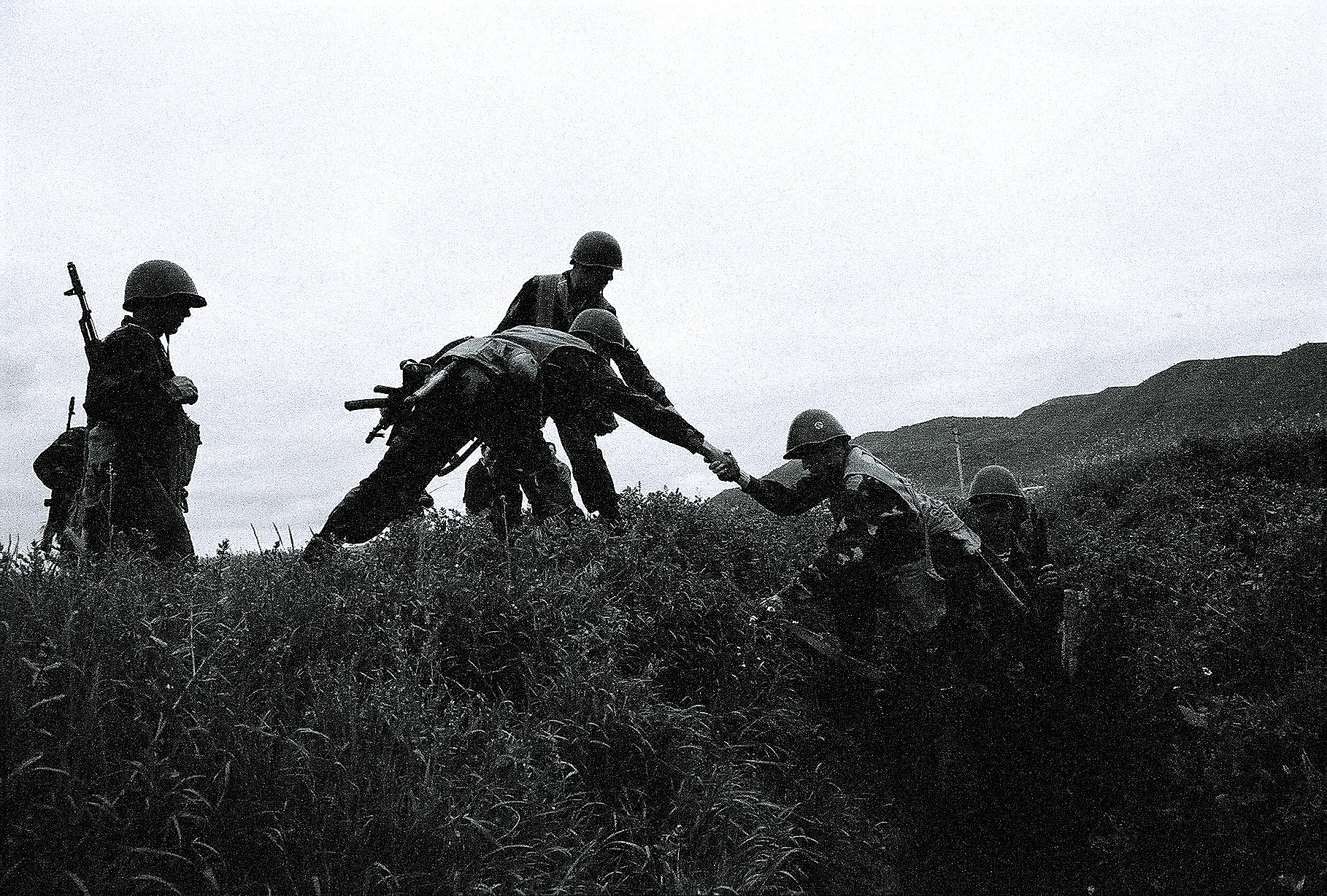
Armenian soldiers in 2008, during Nagorno-Karabakh conflict

On 21 September 1991, Armenia officially declared its statehood after the failed August coup in Moscow in the Russian SFSR. Levon Ter-Petrosyan, who rose to prominence during the Karabakh movement, was popularly elected the first president of the newly independent Republic of Armenia in October 1991. The Soviet Union formally dissolved following the Belovezha Accords in December 1991 and Armenia's independence was recognised.

Ter-Petrosyan led Armenia alongside defence minister Vazgen Sargsyan through the First Nagorno-Karabakh War with neighbouring Azerbaijan. The initial post-Soviet years were marred by economic difficulties and a severe energy crisis. The latter was rooted in the early years of the Karabakh conflict when the Azerbaijani Popular Front managed to pressure the Azerbaijan SSR to instigate a railway and air blockade against Armenia. This move effectively debilitated Armenia's economy as 85% of its cargo and goods arrived through rail traffic. In 1993, Turkey joined the blockade against Armenia in support of Azerbaijan.

The first Karabakh war ended after a Russian-brokered ceasefire was concluded in 1994. The war was a success for the Karabakh Armenian forces who managed to capture practically the entire territory of the former NKAO as well as most of seven adjacent districts of Azerbaijan. The Armenian backed forces remained in control of almost all of that territory until 2020. By the time both Azerbaijan and Armenia had finally agreed to a ceasefire in 1994, an estimated 30,000 people had been killed and over a million had been displaced.

=== 21st century ===
In the 21st century, Armenia continued to face many hardships. The 2018 Armenian Revolution was a series of anti-government protests in Armenia from April to May 2018 staged by various political and civil groups led by a member of the Armenian parliament—Nikol Pashinyan (head of the Civil Contract party). Protests and marches took place initially in response to Serzh Sargsyan's third consecutive term as President of Armenia and later against the Republican Party controlled government in general. Pashinyan declared the movement, which led to Sargsyan's resignation, a "velvet revolution".

In March 2018, the Armenian parliament elected Armen Sarkissian as the new President of Armenia. The controversial constitutional reform to reduce presidential power was implemented, while the authority of the prime minister was strengthened. In May 2018, parliament elected opposition leader Nikol Pashinyan as the new prime minister. His predecessor Serzh Sargsyan resigned two weeks earlier following widespread anti-government demonstrations.

On 27 September 2020, a full-scale war erupted due to the unresolved Nagorno-Karabakh conflict. Both the armed forces of Armenia and Azerbaijan reported military and civilian casualties. The Nagorno-Karabakh ceasefire agreement to end the six-week war between Armenia and Azerbaijan was seen by many as Armenia's defeat and capitulation. The year-long March of Dignity protests forced early elections.

On 20 June 2021, Pashinyan's Civil Contract party won an early parliamentary election. Acting Prime Minister Nikol Pashinyan was officially appointed to the post of prime minister by Armenia's President Armen Sarkissian. In January 2022, Armenian President Armen Sarkissian resigned from office, stating that the constitution no longer gives the president sufficient powers or influence. On 3 March 2022, Vahagn Khachaturyan was elected as the fifth president of Armenia in the second round of parliamentary vote. The next month yet more protests broke out.

==== 2023 Azerbaijani offensive in Nagorno-Karabakh ====
Between 19 and 20 September 2023, Azerbaijan launched a large-scale military offensive against the self-declared breakaway state of Artsakh, a move seen by the European Parliament as a violation of the 2020 ceasefire agreement. The offensive took place in the disputed region of Nagorno-Karabakh, which is internationally recognized as part of Azerbaijan, but populated by Armenians. The attacks occurred in the midst of an escalating crisis caused by Azerbaijan blockading Artsakh, which resulted in significant scarcities of essential supplies such as food, medicine, and other goods in the affected region.

One day after the offensive started, on 20 September, a ceasefire agreement was reached at the mediation of the Russian peacekeeping command in Nagorno-Karabakh. Azerbaijan held a meeting with representatives of the Nagorno-Karabakh Armenians on 21 September in Yevlakh, to be followed by another meeting in October. Ceasefire violations by Azerbaijan were nonetheless reported by both Artsakhi residents and officials.

Human rights organisations and experts in genocide prevention issued multiple alerts, stating that the region's Armenian population was at risk or actively being subjected to ethnic cleansing and genocide. Luis Moreno Ocampo, a former prosecutor of the International Criminal Court, warned that another Armenian genocide could take place, and attributed the inaction of the international community to encouraging Azerbaijan that it would face no serious consequences.

On 8 August 2025, Armenian Prime Minister Nikol Pashinyan and Azerbaijani President Ilham Aliyev signed a joint declaration at the White House, committing to a peace deal facilitated by the Trump administration that would end nearly four decades of conflict between the two countries.

== Geography ==
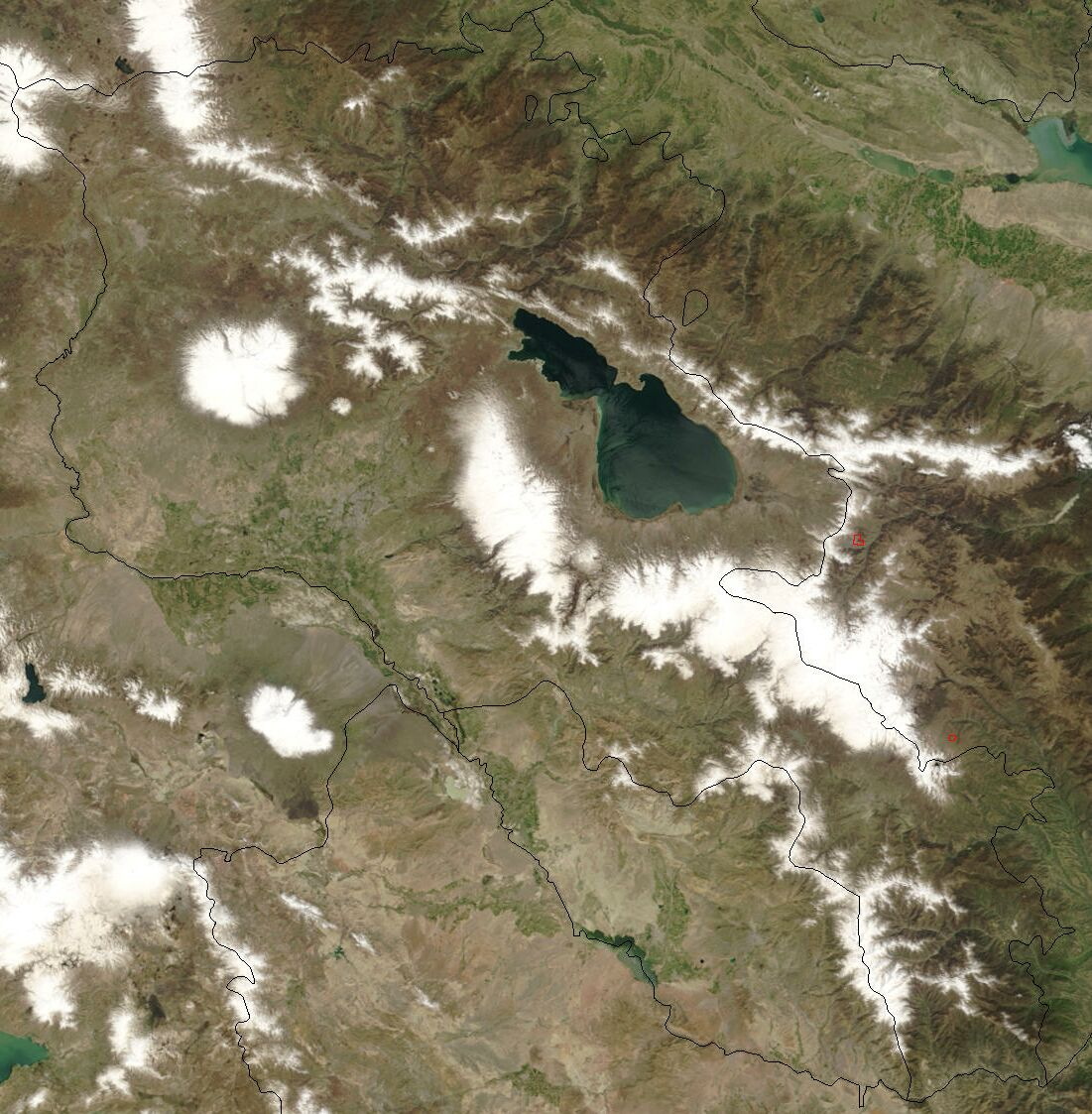
Satellite image of the territory of Armenia (2003)

Armenia is a landlocked country in the geopolitical Transcaucasus (South Caucasus) region, that is located in the Southern Caucasus Mountains and their lowlands between the Black Sea and Caspian Sea, and northeast of the Armenian Highlands. Armenia is widely accepted as part of West Asia geographically, although other definitions place it either fully in Europe or across Europe and Asia. Located on the Armenian Highlands, it is bordered by Turkey to the west, Georgia to the north, the Lachin corridor which is a part of Lachin District that is under the control of a Russian peacekeeping force and Azerbaijan proper to the east, and Iran and Azerbaijan's exclave of Nakhchivan to the south. Armenia lies between latitudes 38° and 42° N, and meridians 43° and 47° E. It contains two terrestrial ecoregions: Caucasus mixed forests and Eastern Anatolian montane steppe.

=== Topography ===
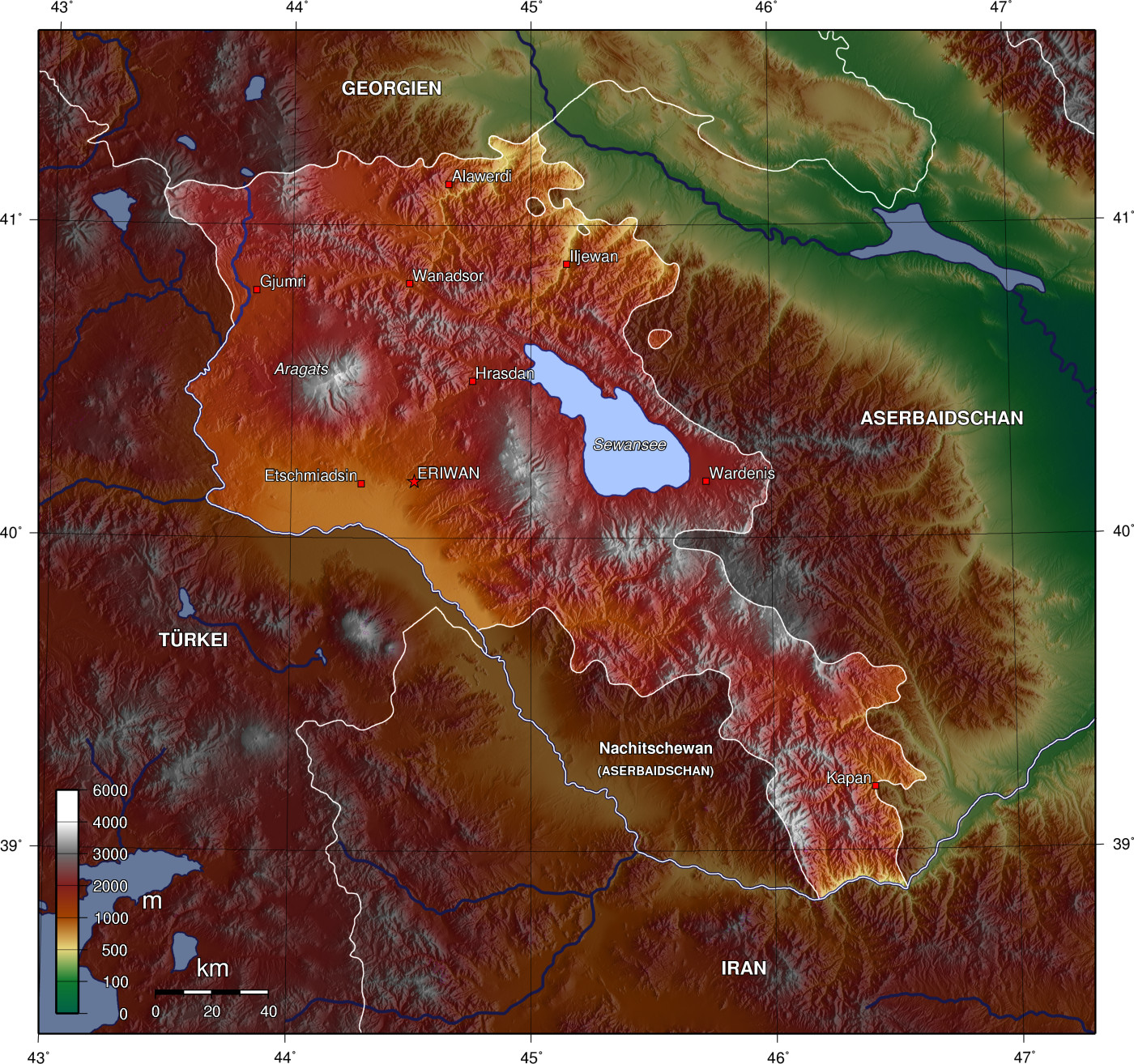
Armenia's mountainous and volcanic topography

Armenia has a territorial area of 29,743 square kilometres (11,484 sq mi). The terrain is mostly mountainous, with fast flowing rivers, and few forests. The land rises to 4,090 metres (13,419 feet) above sea level at Mount Aragats, and no point is below 390 metres (1,280 ft) above sea level. Average elevation of the country area is tenth highest in the world and it has 85.9% mountain area, more than Switzerland or Nepal.

Mount Ararat, which was historically part of Armenia, is the highest mountain in the region at 5,137 meters (16,854 feet). Now located in Turkey, but clearly visible from Armenia, it is regarded by the Armenians as a symbol of their land. Because of this, the mountain is present on the Armenian national emblem today.

=== Climate ===
Köppen-Geiger climate classification map for Armenia

The climate in Armenia is markedly highland continental. Summers are hot, dry and sunny, lasting from June to mid-September. The temperature fluctuates between 22 and 36 °C (72 and 97 °F). However, the low humidity level mitigates the effect of high temperatures. Evening breezes blowing down the mountains provide a welcome refreshing and cooling effect. Springs are short, while autumns are long. Autumns are known for their vibrant and colourful foliage.

Winters are quite cold with plenty of snow, with temperatures ranging between −10 and −5 °C (14 and 23 °F). Winter sports enthusiasts enjoy skiing down the hills of Tsaghkadzor, located thirty minutes outside Yerevan. Lake Sevan, nestled up in the Armenian highlands, is the second largest lake in the world relative to its altitude, at 1,900 metres (6,234 ft) above sea level.

=== Environment ===
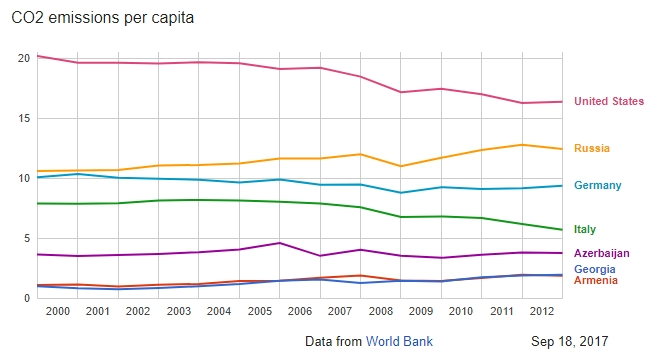
Carbon dioxide emissions in metric tons per capita in Armenia, Azerbaijan, Georgia, Russia, Germany, Italy, USA in 2000–2012. World Bank data.

Armenia ranked 63rd out of 180 countries on Environmental Performance Index (EPI) in 2018. Its rank on subindex Environmental Health (which is weighted at 40% in EPI) is 109, while Armenia's rank on subindex of Ecosystem Vitality (weighted at 60% in EPI) is 27th best in the world. This suggests that main environmental issues in Armenia are with population health, while environment vitality is of lesser concern. Out of sub-subindices contributing to Environmental Health subindex ranking on Air Quality to which population is exposed is particularly unsatisfying.

In Armenia forest cover is around 12% of the total land area, equivalent to 328,470 hectares (ha) of forest in 2020, down from 334,730 hectares (ha) in 1990. In 2020, naturally regenerating forest covered 310,000 hectares (ha) and planted forest covered 18,470 hectares (ha). Of the naturally regenerating forest 5% was reported to be primary forest (consisting of native tree species with no clearly visible indications of human activity) and around 0% of the forest area was found within protected areas. For the year 2015, 100% of the forest area was reported to be under public ownership.

Waste management in Armenia is underdeveloped, as no waste sorting or recycling takes place at Armenia's 60 landfills. A waste processing plant is scheduled for construction near Hrazdan city, which will allow for closure of 10 waste dumps.

Despite the availability of abundant renewable energy sources in Armenia (especially hydroelectric and wind power) and calls from EU officials to shut down the nuclear power plant at Metsamor, the Armenian Government is exploring the possibilities of installing new small modular nuclear reactors. In 2018 existing nuclear plant is scheduled for modernisation to enhance its safety and increase power production by about 10%.

== Government and politics ==
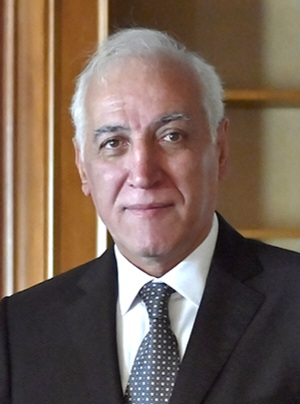
Vahagn Khachaturyan
President

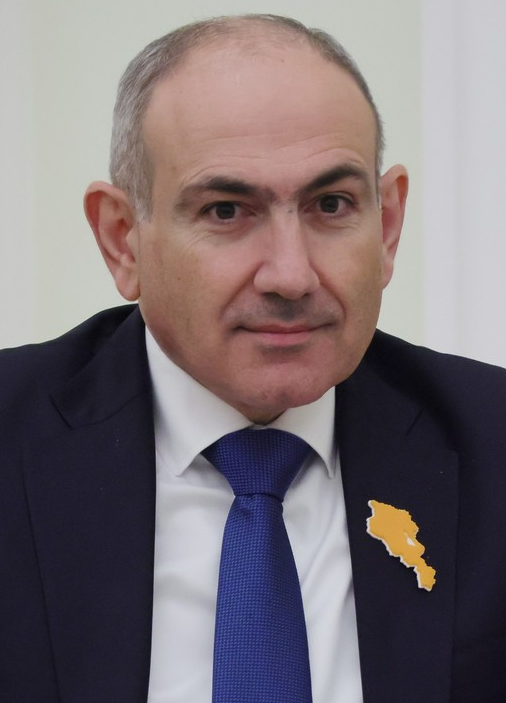
Nikol Pashinyan
Prime Minister

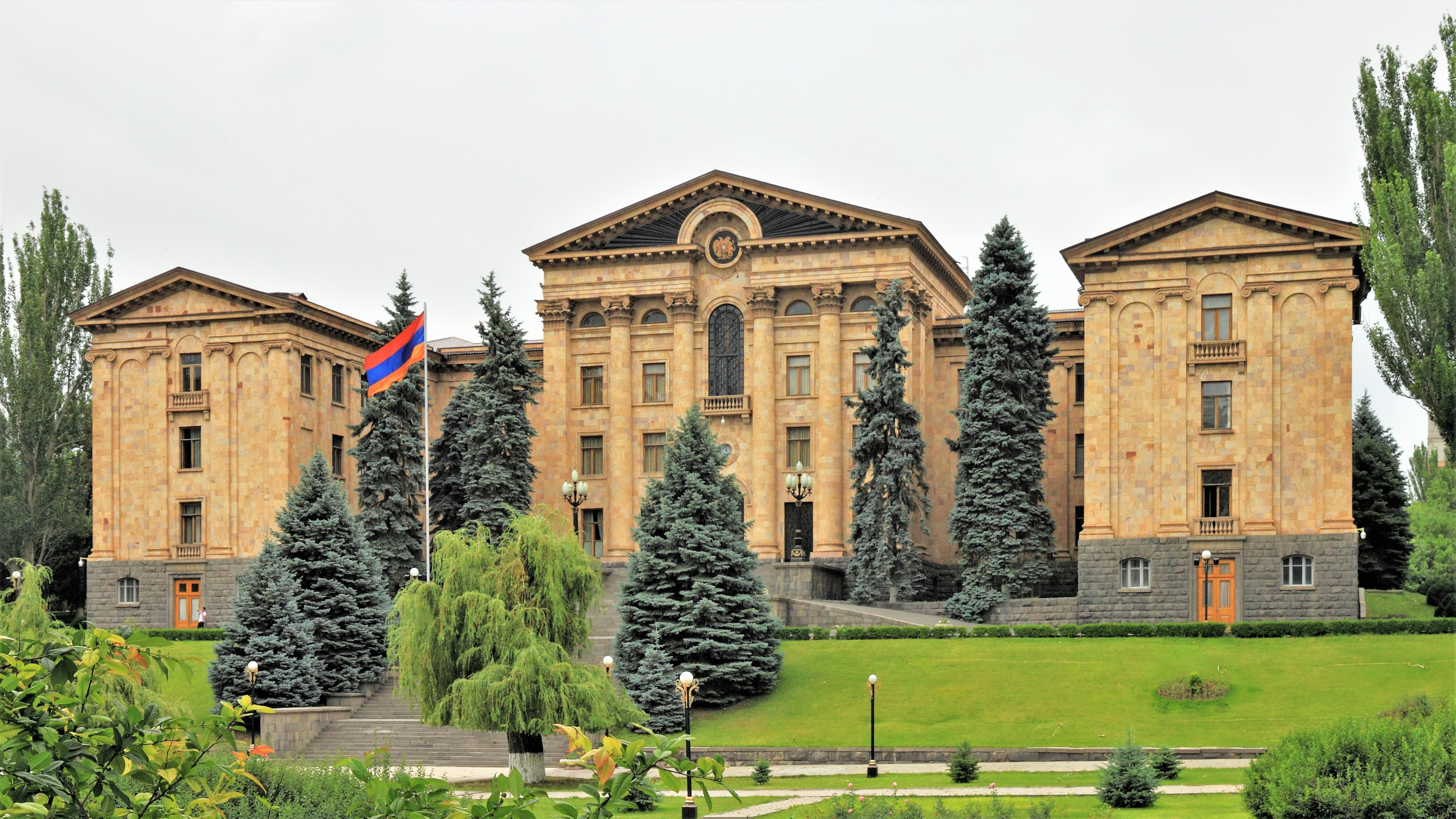
The National Assembly in Yerevan

Armenia is a representative parliamentary democratic republic. The Armenian constitution adhered to the model of a semi-presidential republic until April 2018.

According to the current Constitution of Armenia, the President is the head of state holding largely representational functions, while the Prime Minister is the head of government and exercises executive power.

Since 1995, legislative power is vested in the Azgayin Zhoghov or National Assembly, which is a unicameral parliament consisting of 105 members.

Since its first report in 2006 until its most recent in 2019, the Fragile States Index has consistently ranked Armenia better than all its neighboring countries (with one exception in 2011).

Armenia has universal suffrage from the age of 18.

=== Administrative divisions ===

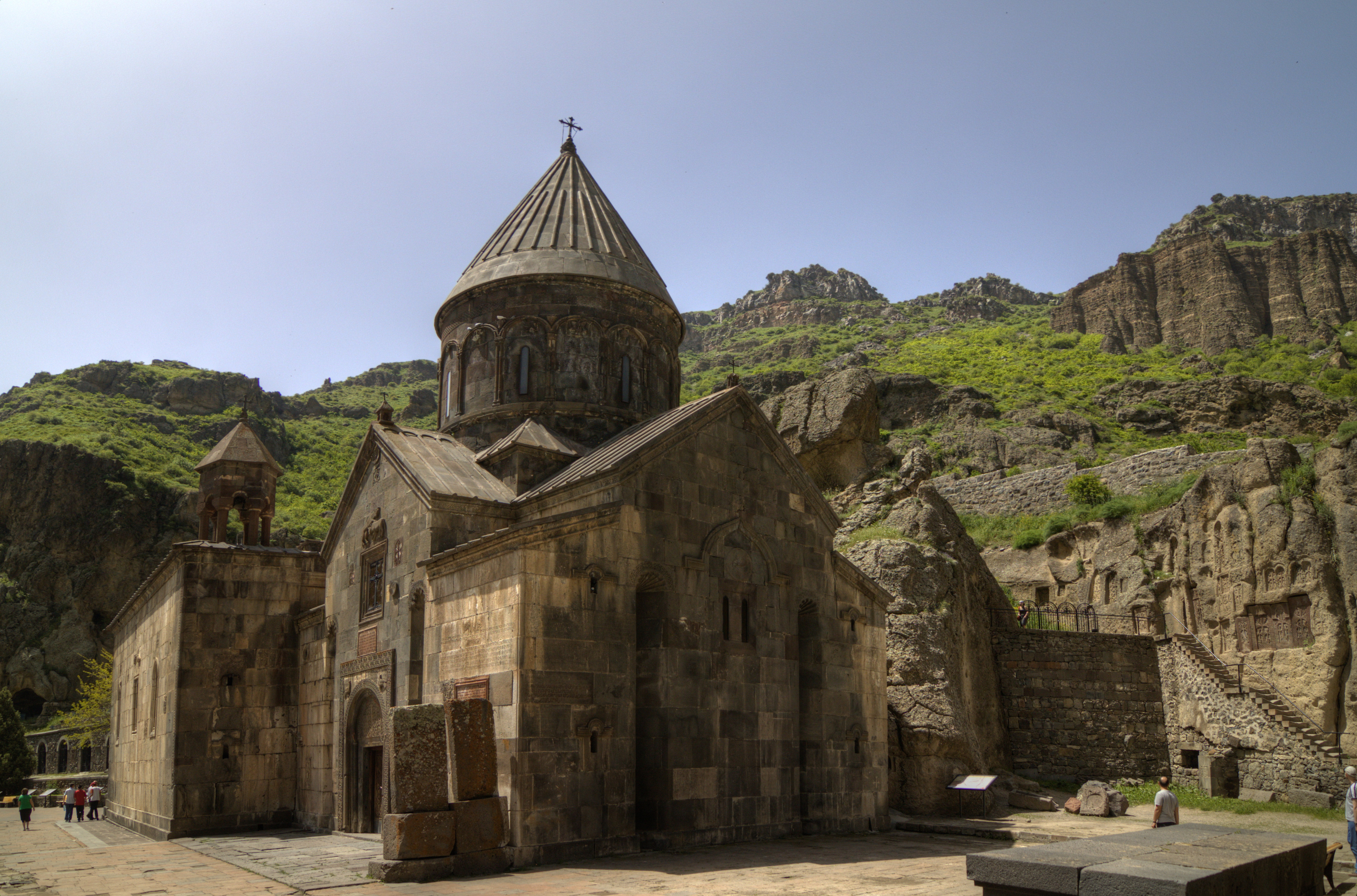
Geghard monastery, Kotayk Province

Armenia is divided into ten provinces (marzer, singular marz), with the city (kaghak) of Yerevan (Երևան) having special administrative status as the country's capital. The chief executive in each of the ten provinces is the marzpet (marz governor), appointed by the government of Armenia. In Yerevan, the chief executive is the mayor, elected since 2009.

Within each province there are communities (hamaynkner, singular hamaynk). Each community is self-governing and consists of one or more settlements (bnakavayrer, singular bnakavayr). Settlements are classified as either towns (kaghakner, singular kaghak) or villages (gyugher, singular gyugh). As of 2007, Armenia includes 915 communities, of which 49 are considered urban and 866 are considered rural. The capital, Yerevan, also has the status of a community. Additionally, Yerevan is divided into twelve semi-autonomous districts.

Province		Capital		Area (km^{2})	Population (2011 census)	Population (2022 census)
Aragatsotn	Արագածոտն	Ashtarak	Աշտարակ	2,756	132,925	128,941
Ararat	Արարատ	Artashat	Արտաշատ	2,090	260,367	248,982
Armavir	Արմավիր	Armavir	Արմավիր	1,242	265,770	253,493
Gegharkunik	Գեղարքունիք	Gavar	Գավառ	5,349	235,075	209,669
Kotayk	Կոտայք	Hrazdan	Հրազդան	2,086	254,397	269,883
Lori	Լոռի	Vanadzor	Վանաձոր	3,799	235,537	222,805
Shirak	Շիրակ	Gyumri	Գյումրի	2,680	251,941	235,484
Syunik	Սյունիք	Kapan	Կապան	4,506	141,771	114,488
Tavush	Տավուշ	Ijevan	Իջևան	2,704	128,609	114,940
Vayots Dzor	Վայոց Ձոր	Yeghegnadzor	Եղեգնաձոր	2,308	52,324	47,369
Yerevan	Երևան	–	–	223	1,060,138	1,086,677

=== Foreign relations ===
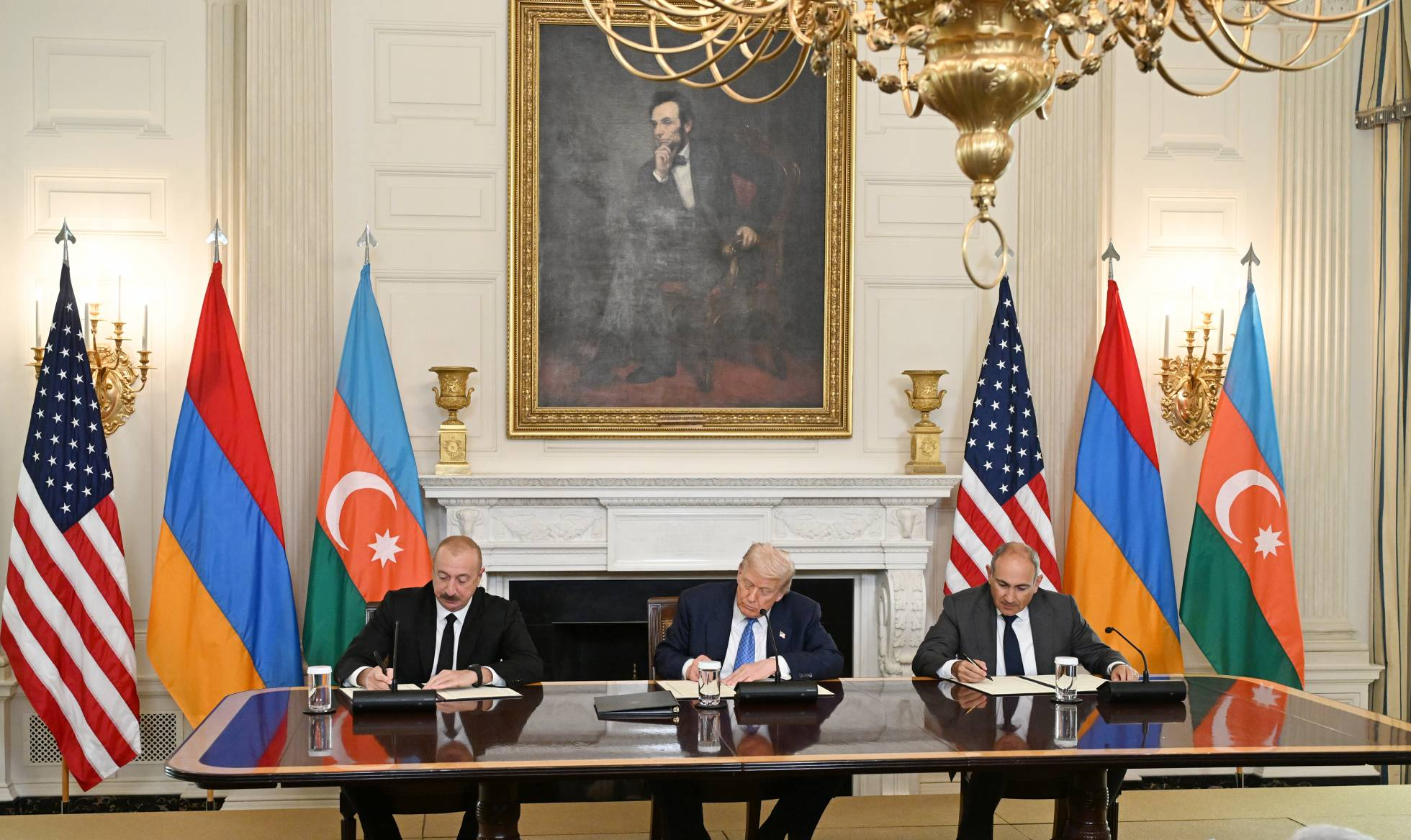
Joint Declaration signed on meeting between Armenian Prime Minister Nikol Pashinyan and Azerbaijani President Ilham Aliyev held in Washington, D.C., 8 August 2025

Armenia became a member of the United Nations on 2 March 1992, and is a signatory to a number of its organisations and other international agreements. Armenia is also a member of international organisations such as the Council of Europe, the Asian Development Bank, the European Bank for Reconstruction and Development, the European Political Community, the Commonwealth of Independent States, the Organization for Security and Cooperation in Europe, the International Monetary Fund, the World Trade Organization, the World Customs Organization, the Organization of the Black Sea Economic Cooperation and La Francophonie. It is a member of the CSTO military alliance, and also participates in NATO's Partnership for Peace programme and the Euro-Atlantic Partnership Council. In 2004, its forces joined KFOR, a NATO-led international force in Kosovo. Armenia is also an observer member of the Arab League, the Organization of American States, the Pacific Alliance, the Non-Aligned Movement, and a dialogue partner in the Shanghai Cooperation Organisation. As a result of its historical ties to France, Armenia was selected to host the biennial Francophonie summit in 2018.

Armenia has a difficult relation with neighbouring countries Azerbaijan and Turkey. Tensions were running high between Armenians and Azerbaijanis during the final years of the Soviet Union. The Nagorno-Karabakh conflict dominated the region's politics throughout the 1990s. To this day, Armenia's borders with Turkey and Azerbaijan are under a severe blockade. In addition, a permanent solution for the Nagorno-Karabakh conflict has not been reached despite the mediation provided by organisations such as the OSCE.

Turkey also has a long history of poor relations with Armenia over its refusal to acknowledge the Armenian genocide, even though it was one of the first countries to recognize the Republic of Armenia (the third republic) after its independence from the USSR in 1991. Despite this, for most of the 20th century and early 21st century, relations remain tense and there are no formal diplomatic relations between the two countries due to Turkey's refusal to establish them for numerous reasons. During the first Nagorno-Karabakh War, and citing it as the reason, Turkey closed its border with Armenia in 1993. It has not lifted its blockade despite pressure from the powerful Turkish business lobby interested in Armenian markets.

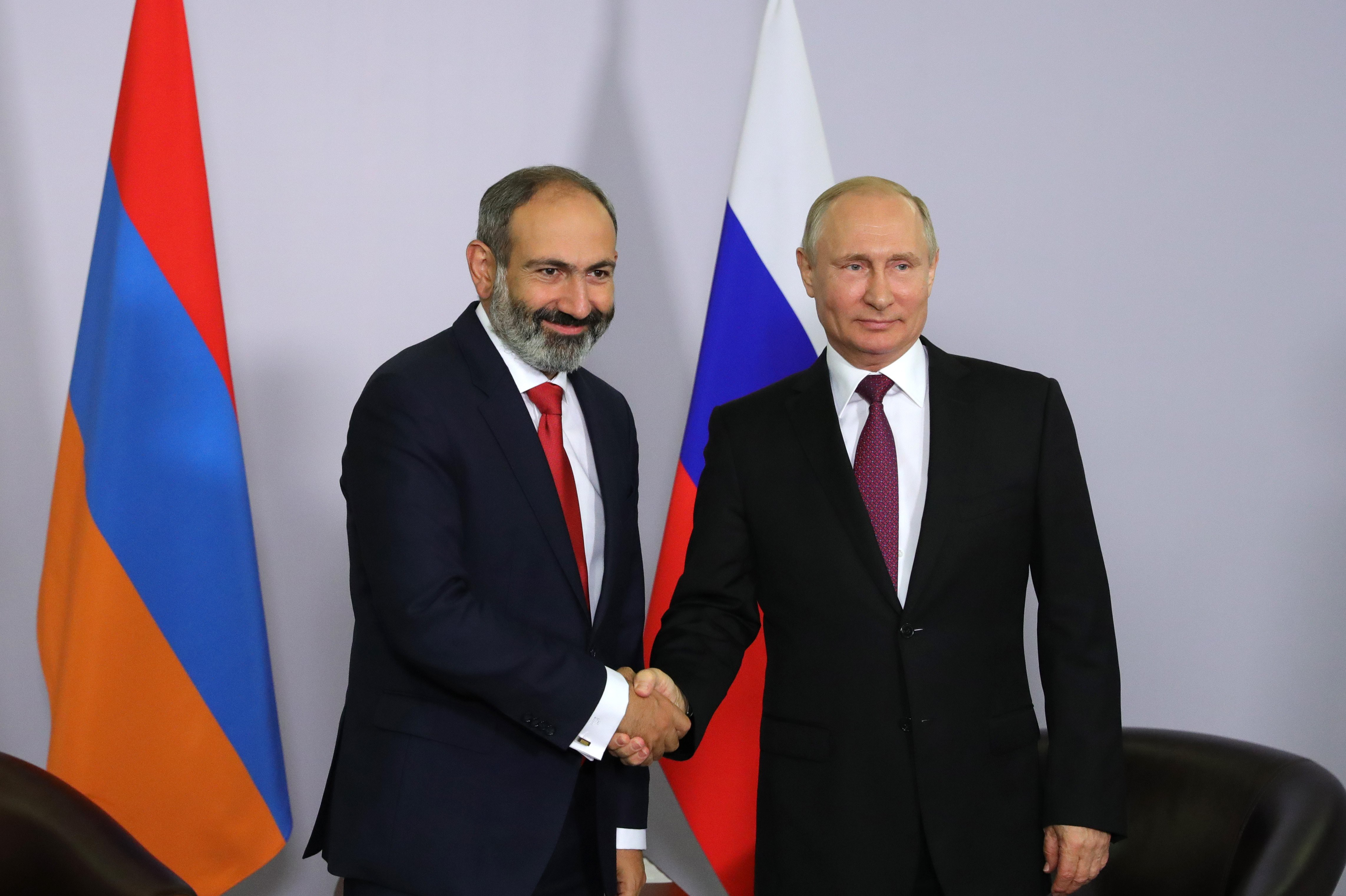
Russian president Vladimir Putin shakes hands with Armenian prime minister Nikol Pashinyan, 2018

On 10 October 2009, Armenia and Turkey signed protocols on the normalisation of relations, which set a timetable for restoring diplomatic ties and reopening their joint border. The ratification of those had to be made in the national parliaments. In Armenia, before sending the protocols to the parliament, it was sent to the Constitutional Court to have their constitutionality to be approved. The Constitutional Court made references to the preamble of the protocols underlying three main issues. One of them stated that the implementation of the protocols did not imply Armenia's official recognition of the existing Turkish-Armenian border established by the Treaty of Kars. By doing so, the Constitutional Court rejected one of the main premises of the protocols, i.e. "the mutual recognition of the existing border between the two countries as defined by relevant treaties of international law". This was for the Turkish Government the reason to back down from the Protocols. The Armenian President had made multiple public announcements, both in Armenia and abroad, that, as the leader of the political majority of Armenia, he assured the parliamentary ratification of the protocols if Turkey also ratified them. Despite this, the process stopped, as Turkey continuously added more preconditions to its ratification and also "delayed it beyond any reasonable time-period".

Armenia maintains close cultural, economic, and security ties with Russia. Due to the republic's position between two hostile neighbours, the security component is especially important. At the request of the Armenian government, Russia maintains a military base in the city of Gyumri in northwestern Armenia as a deterrent against NATO member Turkey. At the same time, Armenia has friendly relations with the United States, which is home to the second largest Armenian diaspora community in the world after Russia. According to the US Census Bureau, there are 427,822 Armenian Americans in the country.

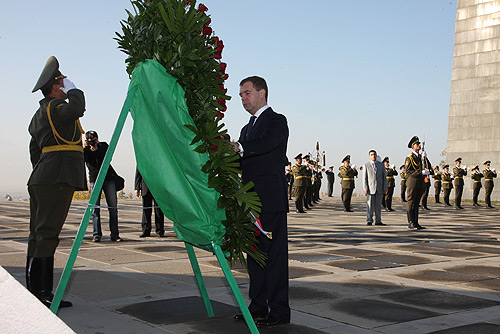
Russian President Dmitry Medvedev at the Armenian Genocide memorial in Yerevan

Because of the illicit border blockades by Azerbaijan and Turkey, Armenia also maintains strong relations with its southern neighbour, Iran, especially in the economic sector. Economic projects are being developed between the two nations, including a gas pipeline going from Iran to Armenia.

Armenia is a member of the Council of Europe and maintains close relations with the European Union; especially with its member states France and Greece. In January 2002, the European Parliament noted that Armenia may enter the EU in the future. A 2005 survey reported that 64% of Armenians favoured joining the EU, a move multiple Armenian officials have voiced support for.

A former Soviet republic and an emerging democracy, Armenia was negotiating to become an associate EU partner and had completed negotiations to sign an Association Agreement with a Deep and Comprehensive Free Trade Area with the EU in 2013. However, the government opted not to finalize the agreement, and instead joined the Eurasian Economic Union. Despite this, Armenia and the EU finalized the Armenia-EU Comprehensive and Enhanced Partnership Agreement (CEPA) on 24 November 2017. The agreement enhances the relationship between Armenia and the EU to a new partnership level, further develops cooperation in economic, trade and political areas, aims to improve investment climate, and is designed to bring Armenian law gradually closer to the EU acquis.

Legally speaking, Armenia has the right to be considered as a prospective EU member provided it meets necessary standards and criteria, though officially such a plan does not exist in Brussels. Armenia is included in the EU's European Neighbourhood Policy (ENP) and participates in both the Eastern Partnership and the Euronest Parliamentary Assembly, which aims at bringing the EU and its neighbours closer.

Following the 2023 Azerbaijani offensive in Nagorno-Karabakh, Armenia's relations with a long-term ally Russia started to deteriorate. In February 2024, Armenian Prime Minister Nikol Pashinyan said that the CSTO "hasn't fulfilled its security obligations towards Armenia" and that "in practice we have basically frozen our participation in the CSTO". On 28 February 2024, during a speech made in the National Assembly, Pashinyan further stated that the CSTO is "a threat to the national security of Armenia". In March 2024, Armenia officially expelled Russian border guards from the Zvartnots International Airport in Yerevan.

On 2 March 2024, Armenian Prime Minister Nikol Pashinyan advised that Armenia would officially "apply to become a candidate for EU membership in the coming days, within a month at most". On 5 March, Pashinyan stated that Armenia would apply for EU candidacy by Autumn 2024 at the latest. On 8 March 2024, Armenian Foreign Minister Ararat Mirzoyan stated, "Armenia is seeking to get closer to the West amid worsening relations with Russia" and "New opportunities are largely being discussed in Armenia nowadays, that includes membership in the European Union".

On 12 February 2025, Armenia's parliament approved a bill officially endorsing Armenia's EU accession. The decision for the government to pass the bill was reported to be the first step of "the beginning of the accession process of Armenia to the European Union".

=== Military ===
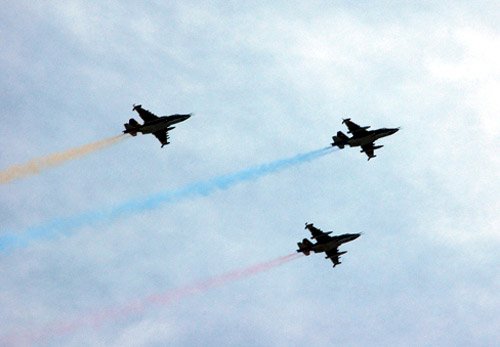
Armenian Air Force Su-25s during a military parade

The Armenian Army and Air Force are the two branches of the Armed Forces of Armenia. The Armenian military was formed after the collapse of the Soviet Union in 1991 and with the establishment of the Ministry of Defence in 1992. The Commander-in-Chief of the military is the Prime Minister of Armenia, Nikol Pashinyan. The Ministry of Defence is in charge of political leadership, headed by Davit Tonoyan, while military command remains in the hands of the general staff, headed by the Chief of Staff, who is Lieutenant-General Onik Gasparyan.

Active forces number about 81,000 soldiers, with an additional reserve of 32,000 troops. Armenian border guards are in charge of patrolling the country's borders with Georgia and Azerbaijan, while Russian troops continue to monitor its borders with Iran and Turkey. In the case of an attack, Armenia is able to mobilize every able-bodied man between the age of 15 and 59, with military preparedness.

The Treaty on Conventional Armed Forces in Europe, which establishes comprehensive limits on key categories of military equipment, was ratified by the Armenian parliament in July 1992. In March 1993, Armenia signed the multilateral Chemical Weapons Convention, which calls for the eventual elimination of chemical weapons. Armenia acceded to the Nuclear Non-Proliferation Treaty (NPT) as a non-nuclear weapons state in July 1993. Armenia is a member of the Collective Security Treaty Organisation (CSTO). Armenia also has an Individual Partnership Action Plan with NATO and it participates in NATO's Partnership for Peace (PiP) programme and the Euro-Atlantic Partnership Council (EAPC).

=== Human rights and freedom ===
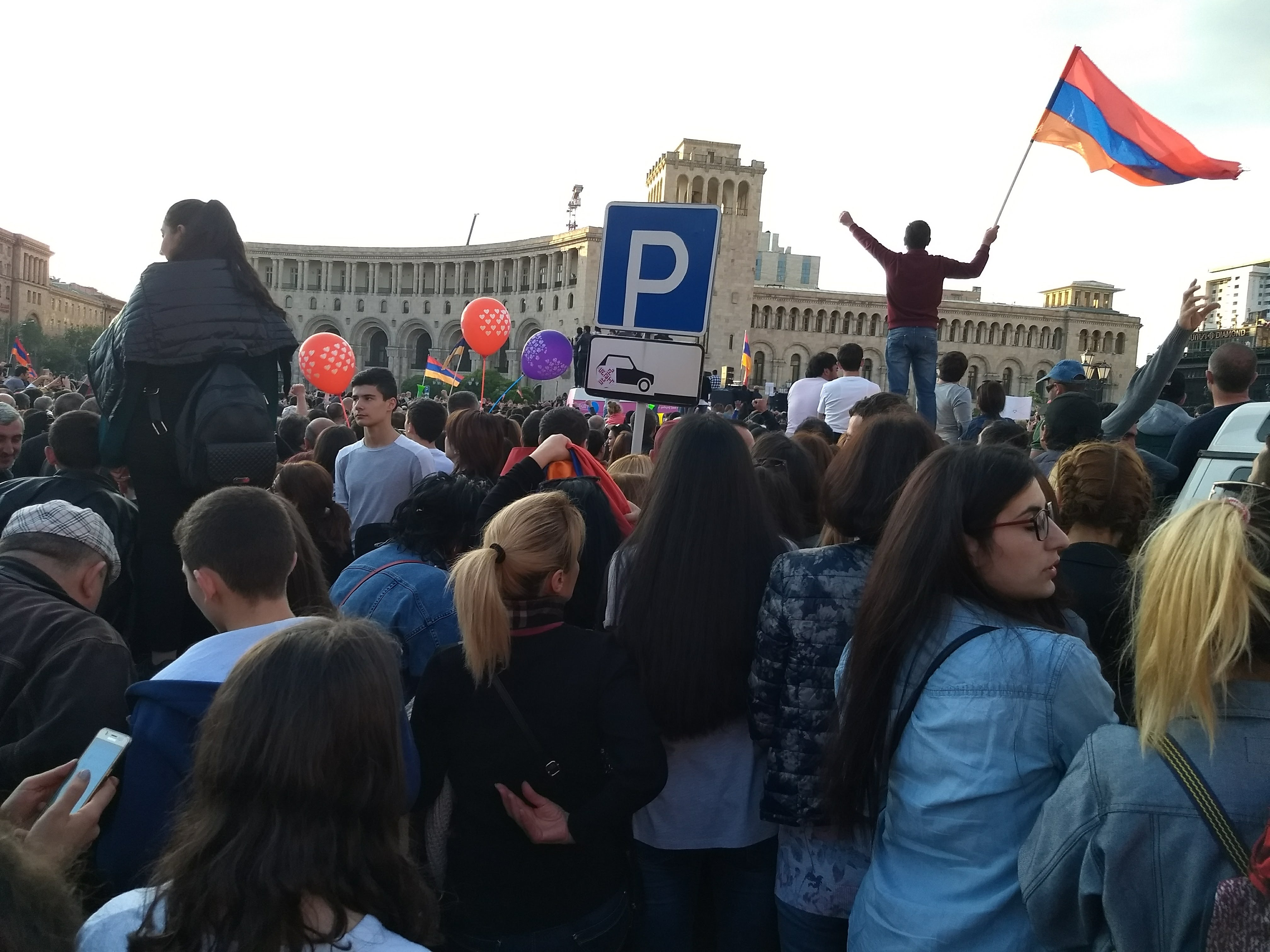
In April 2018, a quasi-authoritarian regime collapsed as a result of a nationwide protest movement in Armenia.

Armenia scored 5.63 on The Economist Democracy Index, published in January 2023 (data for 2022). Although still classified as "hybrid regime", Armenia recorded the strongest improvement among European countries and reached its ever-best score since calculation began in 2006.

Armenia is classified as "partly free" in the 2019 report (with data from 2018) by Freedom House, which gives it a score of 51 out of 100, which is 6 points ahead of the previous estimate.

Armenia recorded unprecedented progress in the 2019 World Press Freedom Index published by Reporters Without Borders, improving its position by 19 points and ranking 61st on the list. The publication also confirms the absence of cases of killed journalists, citizen journalists or media assistants.

Armenia ranks 26th in the 2022 report of The Human Freedom Index published by the American CATO Institute and Canada's Fraser Institute.

Armenia ranked 29th for economic freedom and 76th for personal freedom among 159 countries in the 2017 Human Freedom Index published by the Cato Institute.

In October 2023 Armenia ratified signing the Rome statute, whereby Armenia will become a full member of the International Criminal Court.

== Economy ==
The economy relies heavily on investment and support from Armenians abroad. Before independence, Armenia's economy was largely industry-based – chemicals, electronics, machinery, processed food, synthetic rubber, and textile – and highly dependent on outside resources. The republic had developed a modern industrial sector, supplying machine tools, textiles, and other manufactured goods to sister republics in exchange for raw materials and energy.

Agriculture accounted for less than 20% of both net material product and total employment before the dissolution of the Soviet Union in 1991. After independence, the importance of agriculture in the economy increased markedly, its share at the end of the 1990s rising to more than 30% of GDP and more than 40% of total employment. This increase in the importance of agriculture was attributable to food security needs of the population in the face of uncertainty during the first phases of transition and the collapse of the non-agricultural sectors of the economy in the early 1990s. As the economic situation stabilised and growth resumed, the share of agriculture in GDP dropped to slightly over 20% (2006 data), although the share of agriculture in employment remained more than 40%.

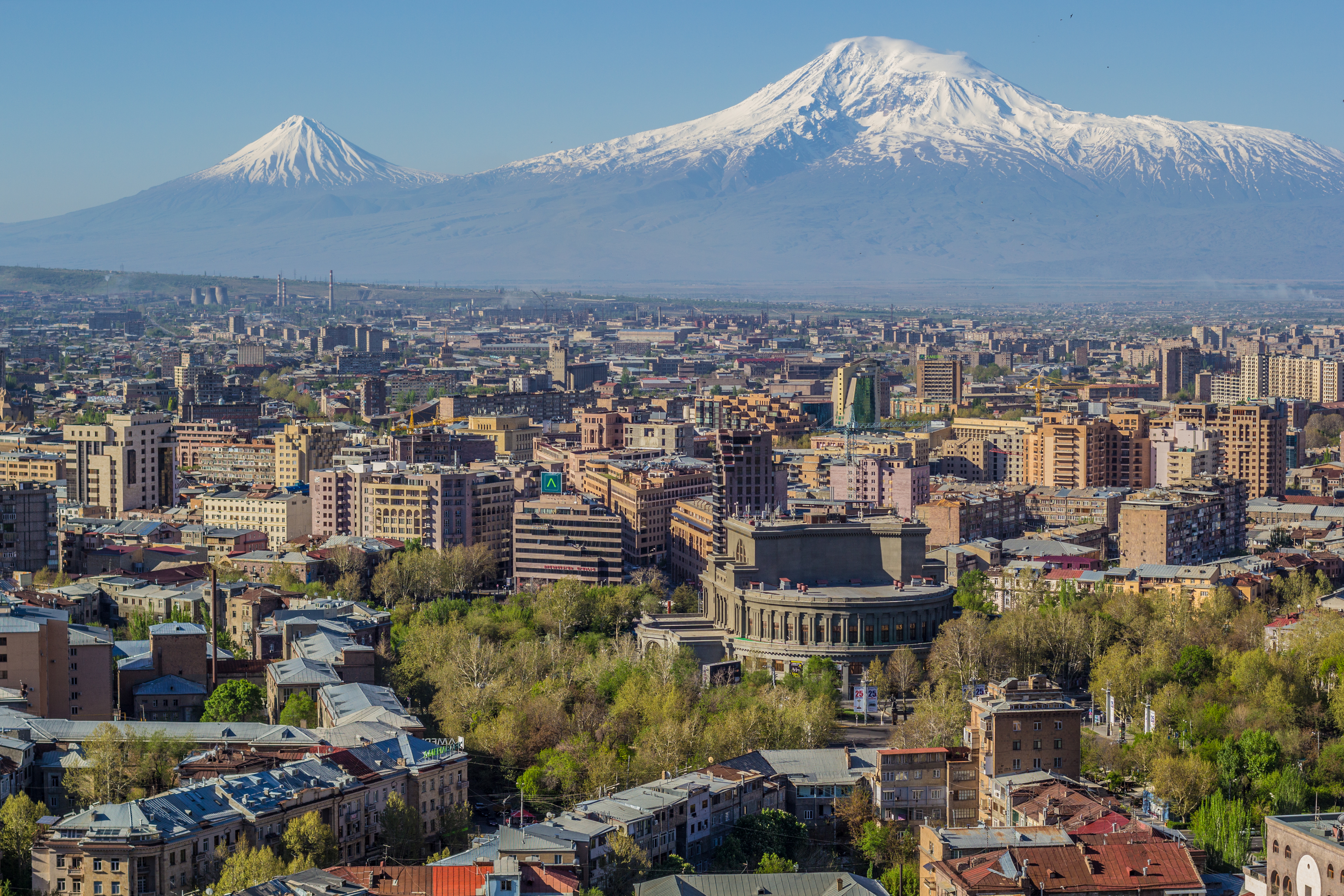
Yerevan is the economic and cultural centre of Armenia.

Armenian mines produce copper, zinc, gold, and lead. The vast majority of energy is produced with fuel imported from Russia, including gas and nuclear fuel (for its one nuclear power plant); the main domestic energy source is hydroelectric. Small deposits of coal, gas, and petroleum exist but have not yet been developed.

Access to biocapacity in Armenia is lower than world average. In 2016, Armenia had 0.8 global hectares of biocapacity per person within its territory, much less than the world average of 1.6 global hectares per person. In 2016 Armenia used 1.9 global hectares of biocapacity per person—their ecological footprint of consumption. This means they use double as much biocapacity as Armenia contains. As a result, Armenia is running a biocapacity deficit.

Like other newly independent states of the former Soviet Union, Armenia's economy suffers from the breakdown of former Soviet trading patterns. Soviet investment in and support of Armenian industry has virtually disappeared, so that few major enterprises are still able to function. In addition, the effects of the 1988 Spitak earthquake, which killed more than 25,000 people and made 500,000 homeless, are still being felt. The conflict with Azerbaijan over Nagorno-Karabakh has not been resolved. Shutdown of the nuclear power plant in 1989 led to the Armenian energy crisis of 1990s. The GDP fell nearly 60% between 1989 and 1993, but then resumed robust growth after the power plant was reopened in 1995. The national currency, the dram, suffered hyperinflation for the first years after its introduction in 1993.

Nevertheless, the government was able to make wide-ranging economic reforms that paid off in dramatically lower inflation and steady growth. The 1994 ceasefire in the Nagorno-Karabakh conflict has also helped the economy. Armenia has had strong economic growth since 1995, building on the turnaround that began the previous year, and inflation has been negligible for the past several years. New sectors, such as precious-stone processing and jewelry making, information and communication technology and tourism are beginning to supplement more traditional sectors of the economy, such as agriculture.

This steady economic progress has earned Armenia increasing support from international institutions. The International Monetary Fund (IMF), World Bank, European Bank for Reconstruction and Development (EBRD), and other international financial institutions (IFIs) and foreign countries are extending considerable grants and loans. Loans to Armenia since 1993 exceed $1.1 billion. These loans are targeted at reducing the budget deficit and stabilising the currency; developing private businesses; energy; agriculture; food processing; transportation; the health and education sectors; and ongoing rehabilitation in the earthquake zone. The government joined the WTO on 5 February 2003. But one of the main sources of foreign direct investments remains the Armenian diaspora, which finances major parts of the reconstruction of infrastructure and other public projects. Being a growing democratic state, Armenia also hopes to get more financial aid from the Western World.

A liberal foreign investment law was approved in June 1994, and a law on privatisation was adopted in 1997, as well as a programme of state property privatisation. Continued progress will depend on the ability of the government to strengthen its macroeconomic management, including increasing revenue collection, improving the investment climate, and making strides against corruption. However, unemployment, which was 18.5% in 2015, still remains a major problem due to the influx of thousands of refugees from the Karabakh conflict.

In 2017, the economy grew by 7.5% due to rising copper prices.

In 2022, Armenia's GDP stood at $39.4 billion, and enjoyed an economic freedom index of 65.3, according to Heritage Organisation.

The Armenian economy is predicted to grow by 13% in 2022 due to a huge influx of Russian citizens. The IMF's preliminary forecast as of March 2022 predicted growth of 1.5% for the year.

=== Science and technology ===
Research spending is low in Armenia, averaging 0.25% of GDP over 2010–2013. However, the statistical record of research expenditure is incomplete, as expenditure by privately owned business enterprises is not surveyed in Armenia. The world average for domestic expenditure on research was 1.7% of GDP in 2013.

Gross domestic expenditure on R&D (GERD) to GDP ratio for the Black Sea countries, 2001–2013. Source: UNESCO Science Report: towards 2030 (2015), Figure 12.3.

The country's Strategy for the Development of Science 2011–2020 envisions that 'by 2020, Armenia is a country with a knowledge-based economy and is competitive within the European Research Area with its level of basic and applied research.' It fixes the following targets:

- Creation of a system capable of sustaining the development of science and technology;
- Development of scientific potential, modernisation of scientific infrastructure;
- Promotion of basic and applied research;
- Creation of a synergistic system of education, science and innovation; and
- Becoming a prime location for scientific specialisation in the European Research Area.

Based on this strategy, the accompanying Action Plan was approved by the government in June 2011. It defines the following targets:

- Improve the management system for science and technology and create the requisite conditions for sustainable development;
- Involve more young, talented people in education and research, while upgrading research infrastructure;
- Create the requisite conditions for the development of an integrated national innovation system; and
- Enhance international co-operation in research and development.

GERD in the Black Sea region by sector of performance, 2005 and 2013. Source: UNESCO Science Report: towards 2030 (2015), Figure 12.5.

Although the Strategy clearly pursues a 'science push' approach, with public research institutes serving as the key policy target, it nevertheless mentions the goal of establishing an innovation system. However, the main driver of innovation, the business sector, is not mentioned. In between publishing the Strategy and Action Plan, the government issued a resolution in May 2010 on Science and Technology Development Priorities for 2010–2014. These priorities are:

- Armenian studies, humanities and social sciences;
- Life sciences;
- Renewable energy, new energy sources;
- Advanced technologies, information technologies;
- Space, Earth sciences, sustainable use of natural resources; and
- Basic research promoting essential applied research.

The Law on the National Academy of Sciences was adopted in May 2011. This law is expected to play a key role in shaping the Armenian innovation system. It allows the National Academy of Sciences to extend its business activities to the commercialisation of research results and the creation of spin-offs; it also makes provision for restructuring the National Academy of Sciences by combining institutes involved in closely related research areas into a single body. Three of these new centres are particularly relevant: the Centre for Biotechnology, the Centre for Zoology and Hydro-ecology and the Centre for Organic and Pharmaceutical Chemistry.

The government is focusing its support on selected industrial sectors. More than 20 projects have been cofunded by the State Committee of Science in targeted branches: pharmaceuticals, medicine and biotechnology, agricultural mechanisation and machine building, electronics, engineering, chemistry and, in particular, the sphere of information technology.

Over the past decade, the government has made an effort to encourage science–industry linkages. The Armenian information technology sector has been particularly active: a number of public–private partnerships have been established between companies and universities, in order to give students marketable skills and generate innovative ideas at the interface of science and business. Examples are Synopsys Inc. and the Enterprise Incubator Foundation. Armenia was ranked 59th in the Global Innovation Index in 2025.

== Demographics ==
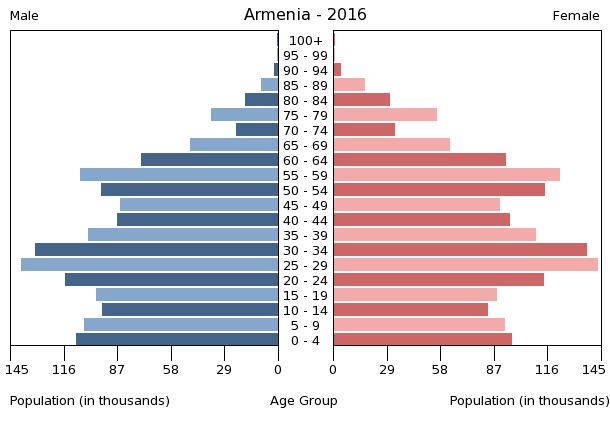
Population pyramid 2016

Armenia has a population of 3,081,100 as of 2025. It is the third most densely populated of the former Soviet republics. The country has faced population decline since the breakup of the USSR due to high levels of emigration; the population peaked at 3.6 million in 1991. However, since 2012, the emigration rate has slowed, and some population growth has been observed.

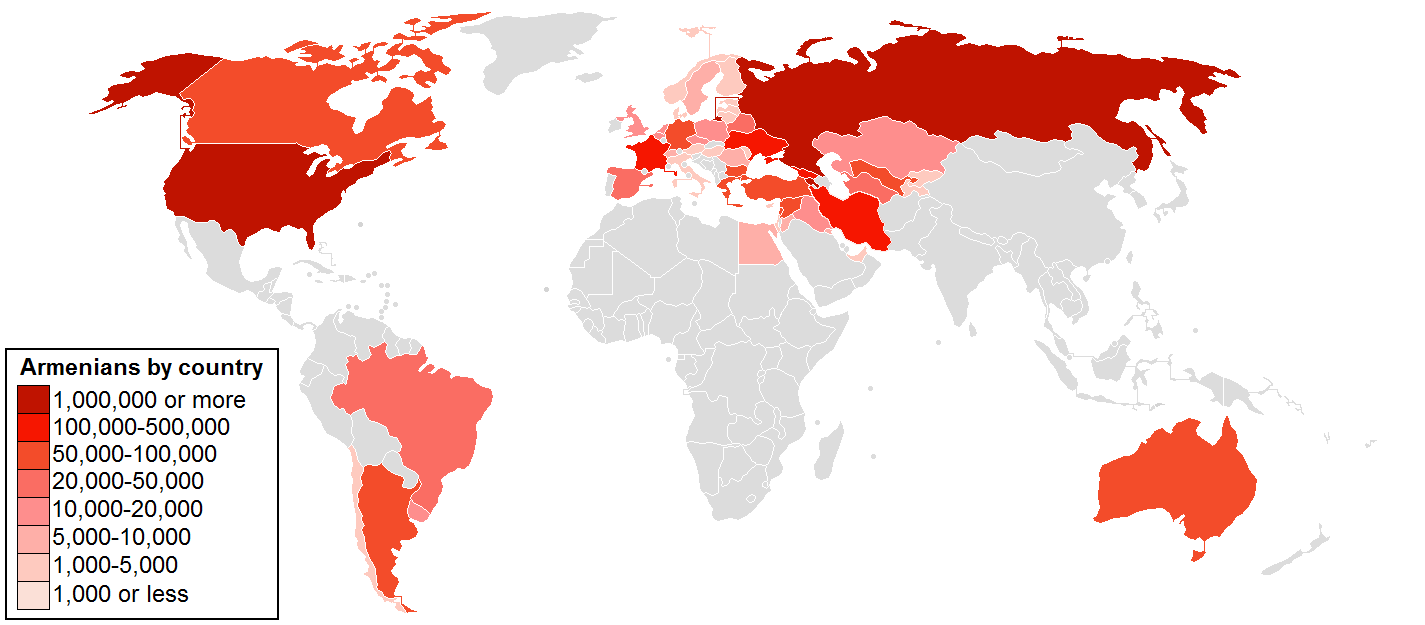
The Armenian population around the world

Armenia has a relatively large external diaspora—8 million by some estimates, greatly exceeding the 3 million people in Armenia itself—which is dispersed across the globe. The largest Armenian communities outside of Armenia are in Russia (1.1 million–2.9 million), the United States (1 million–1.5 million), and France (250,000–750,000); sizable numbers are also found in Georgia, Syria, Lebanon, Australia, Canada, Greece, Cyprus, Israel, Poland, Ukraine, and Brazil. Roughly 40,000 to 70,000 Armenians still live in Turkey (mostly in and around Istanbul), not including between 500,000 and 3 million Turkish citizens who have "hidden" Armenian ancestry.

About 1,000 Armenians reside in the Armenian Quarter in the Old City of Jerusalem, a remnant of a once-larger community. Italy is home to the San Lazzaro degli Armeni, an island located in the Venetian Lagoon, which is completely occupied by a monastery run by the Mechitarists, an Armenian Catholic congregation.

Approximately 139,000 Armenians lived in the de facto independent country Republic of Artsakh, where they formed a majority before 1 October 2023, when almost the entire population fled to Armenia.

=== Cities ===
Largest cities or towns in Armenia Armenia 2022 census
Rank	Name	Province	Pop.	Rank	Name	Province	Pop.
1	Yerevan	Yerevan	1,086,677	11	Artashat	Ararat	19,020
2	Gyumri	Shirak	112,301	12	Sevan	Gegharkunik	18,705
3	Vanadzor	Lori	75,186	13	Ijevan	Tavush	18,689
4	Abovyan	Kotayk	46,434	14	Gavar	Gegharkunik	17,741
5	Vagharshapat	Armavir	44,837	15	Artik	Shirak	17,647
6	Hrazdan	Kotayk	44,231	16	Goris	Syunik	17,113
7	Kapan	Syunik	32,780	17	Ararat	Ararat	16,592
8	Armavir	Armavir	27,470	18	Dilijan	Tavush	15,914
9	Charentsavan	Kotayk	22,071	19	Ashtarak	Aragatsotn	15,686
10	Masis	Ararat	20,081	20	Sisian	Syunik	13,179

=== Ethnic groups ===
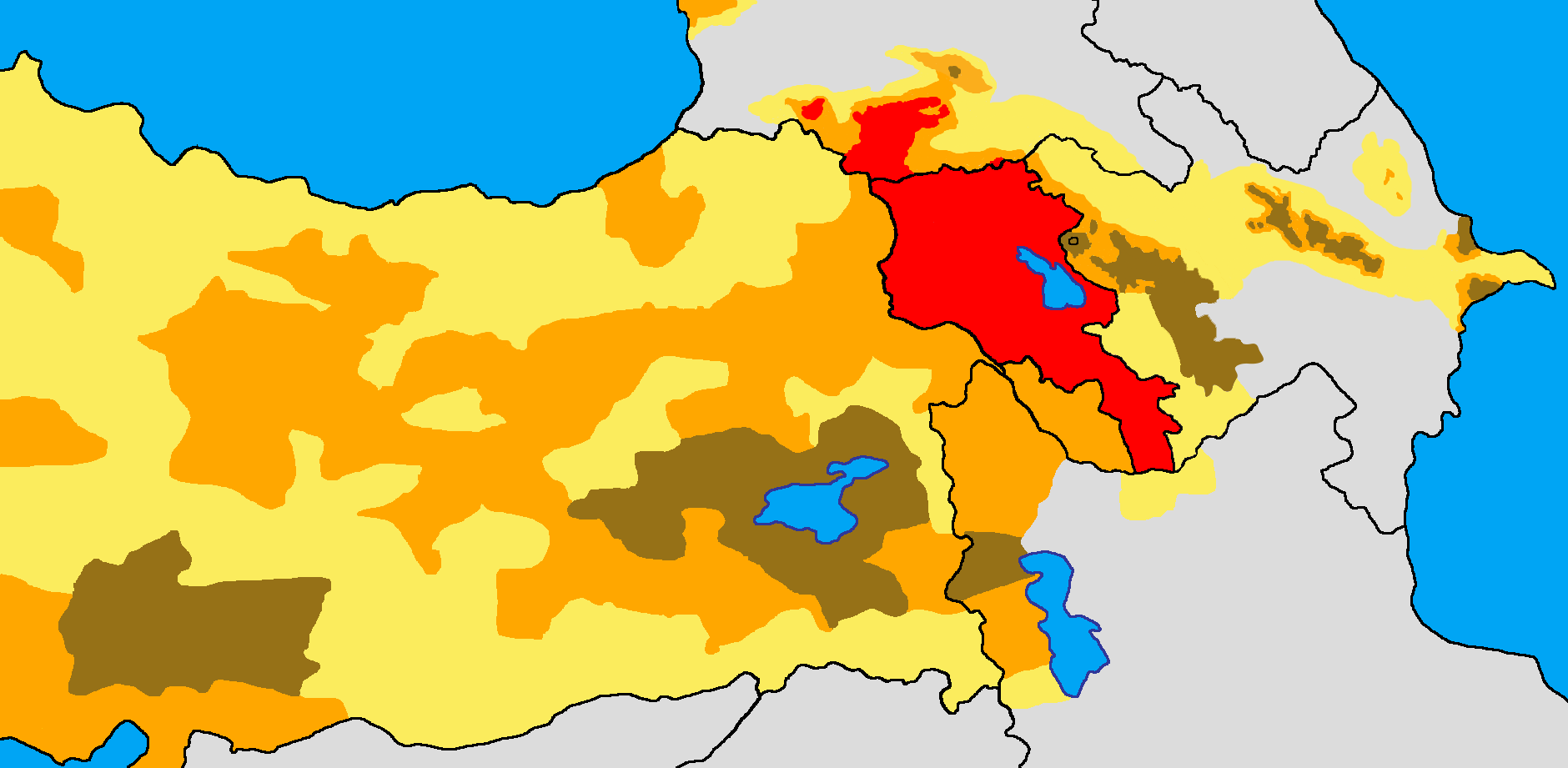
Historical and modern distribution of Armenians. Settlement area of Armenians in early 20th century: >50% 25–50% <25% Armenian settlement area today

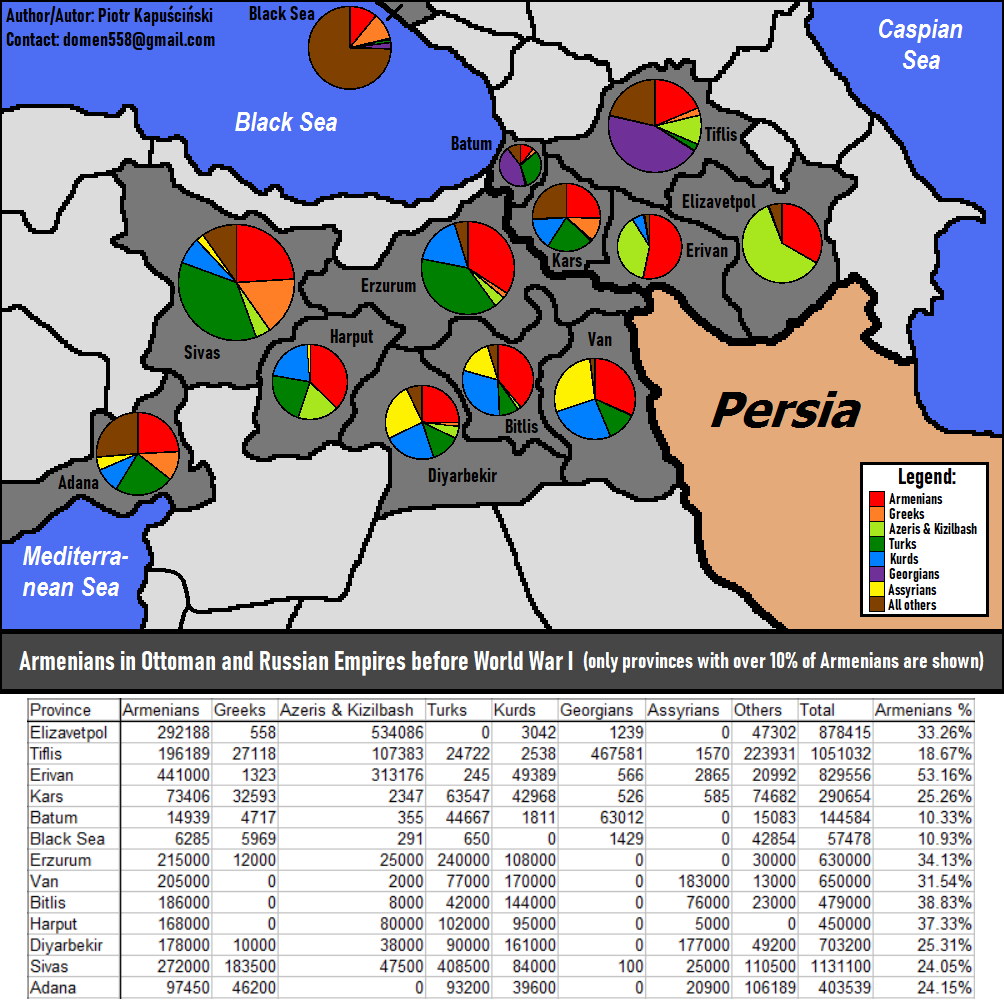
Armenians in the Ottoman Empire and the Russian Empire before World War I.

At the beginning of the 21st century ethnic Armenians made up 98.1% of the population. Yazidis 1.1%, and Russians 0.5%. Other minorities include Assyrians, Ukrainians, Greeks (usually called Caucasus Greeks), Kurds, Georgians, Belarusians, and Jews. There are also smaller communities of Vlachs, Mordvins, Ossetians, Udis, and Tats. Minorities of Poles and Caucasus Germans also exist though they are heavily Russified. As of 2022, there are 31,077 Yazidis in Armenia.

During the Soviet era, Azerbaijanis were historically the second largest population in the country, numbering 76,550 in 1922, and forming about 2.5% in 1989. However, due to the conflict over Nagorno-Karabakh, virtually all of them emigrated from Armenia to Azerbaijan. Conversely, Armenia received a large influx of Armenian refugees from Azerbaijan, thus giving Armenia a more homogeneous character.

According to Gallup research conducted in 2017 Armenia has one of the highest migrant acceptance (welcoming) rates in eastern Europe.

=== Languages ===
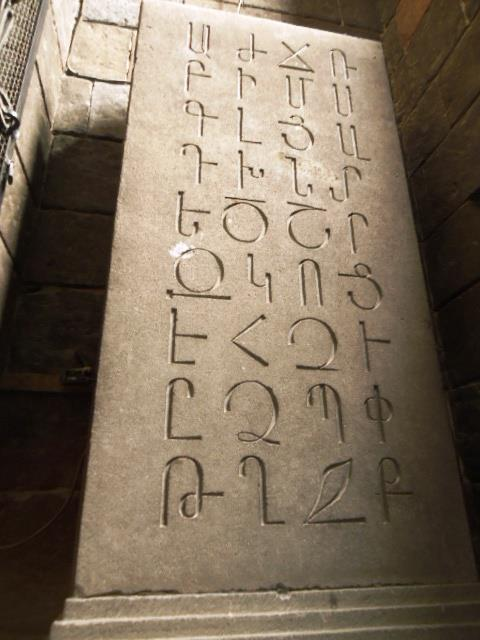
Armenian-language writing

Armenians have their own distinct alphabet and language, which is the only official language. The alphabet, invented by Mesrop Mashtots, consists of thirty-nine letters, three of which were added during the Cilician period. The main foreign languages that Armenians know are Russian and English. Due to its Soviet past, most of the old population can speak Russian quite well. According to a 2013 survey, 95% of Armenians said they had some knowledge of Russian (24% advanced, 59% intermediate) compared to 40% who said they knew some English (4% advanced, 16% intermediate and 20% beginner). However, more adults (50%) think that English should be taught in public secondary schools than those who prefer Russian (44%).

=== Religion ===
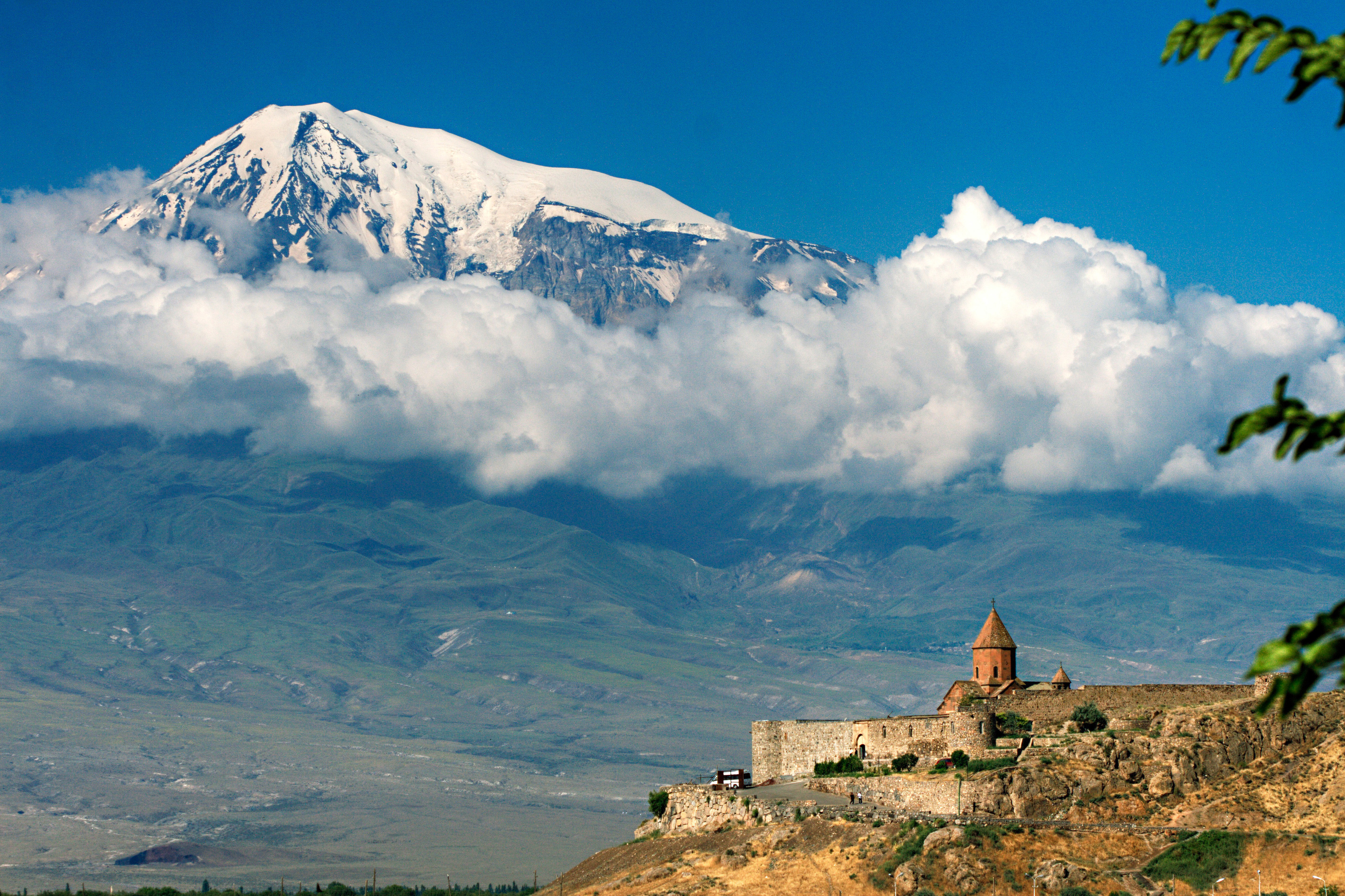
The 7th-century Khor Virap monastery in the shadow of Mount Ararat, the peak on which Noah's Ark is said to have landed during the biblical flood.

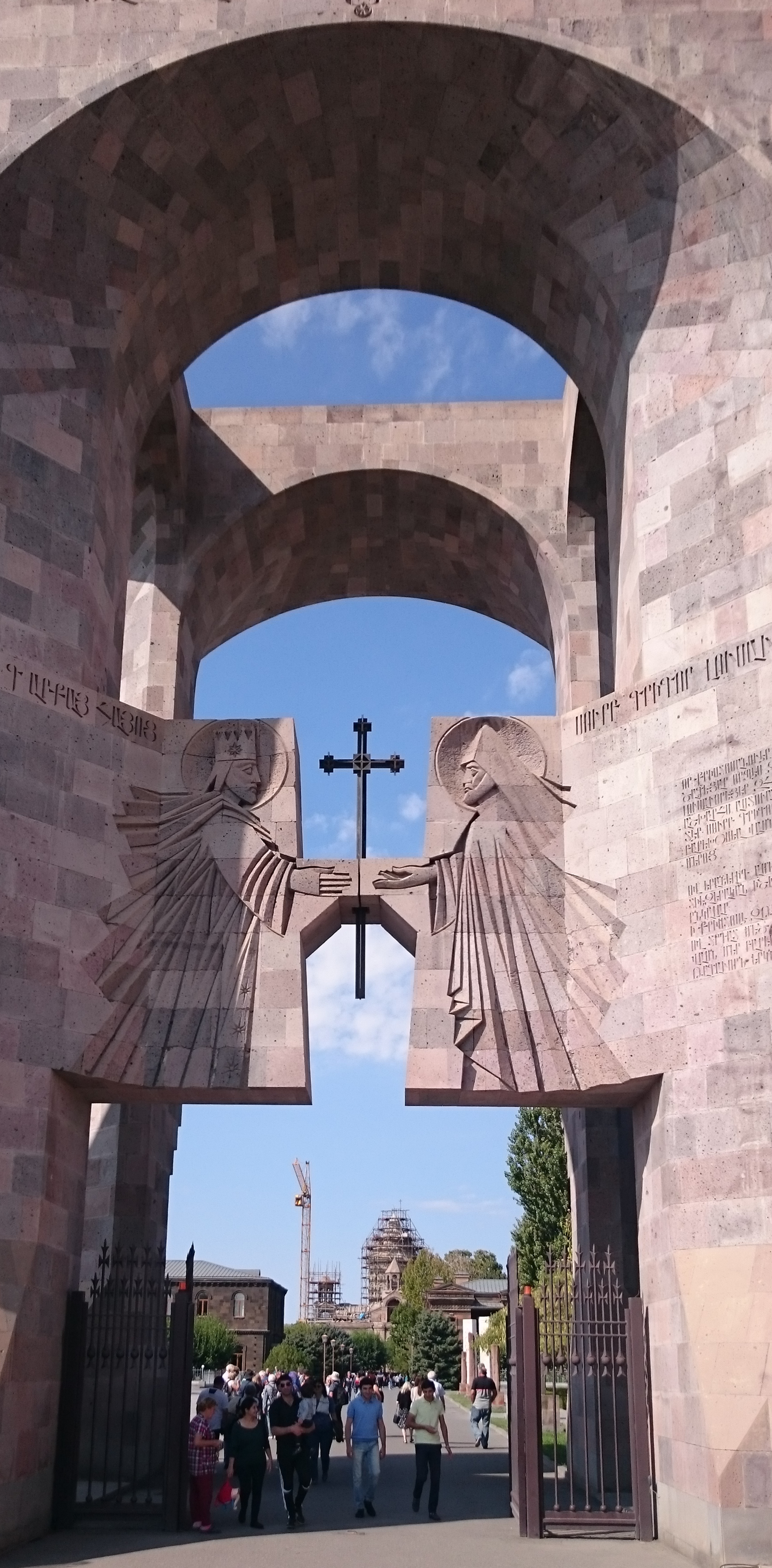
Portal to the Holy See at Etchmiadzin, the seat of the Catholicos

The predominant religion of Armenia is Christianity. Its roots in the country go back to the 1st century AD, when it arrived by way of the apostles Thaddaeus and Bartholomew. Armenia was the first nation to adopt Christianity as a state religion, an event traditionally dated to AD 301. Over 93% of Christians in Armenia belong to the Armenian Apostolic Church, which is in communion only with the churches comprising Oriental Orthodoxy—of which it is itself a member.

The Catholic Church maintains jurisdictions of both the Latin Church and Armenian Catholic Church in Armenia. Of note are the Mechitarists (also spelled "Mekhitarists" Armenian: Մխիթարեան), a congregation of Benedictine monks in the Armenian Catholic Church, founded in 1712 by Mekhitar of Sebaste. They are best known for their series of scholarly publications of ancient Armenian versions of otherwise lost ancient Greek texts.

Other Christian denominations include the Armenian Evangelical Church and the Pentecostal branches of the Protestant community. These include the Word of Life, the Armenian Brotherhood Church, the Baptists (which are known as one of the oldest existing denominations in Armenia, and were permitted by the authorities of the Soviet Union), and Presbyterians.

Armenia is also home to a Russian community of Molokans which practice a form of Spiritual Christianity originated from the Russian Orthodox Church.

The Yazidis, who live in the western part of the country, practice Yazidism. The world's largest Yazidi temple, Quba Mêrê Dîwanê, was completed in 2019 in the village of Aknalich.

There is a Jewish community in Armenia of approximately 750 people since independence with most emigrants leaving for Israel. There are currently two synagogues in Armenia – one in the capital, Yerevan, and the other in the city of Sevan located near Lake Sevan.

=== Education ===
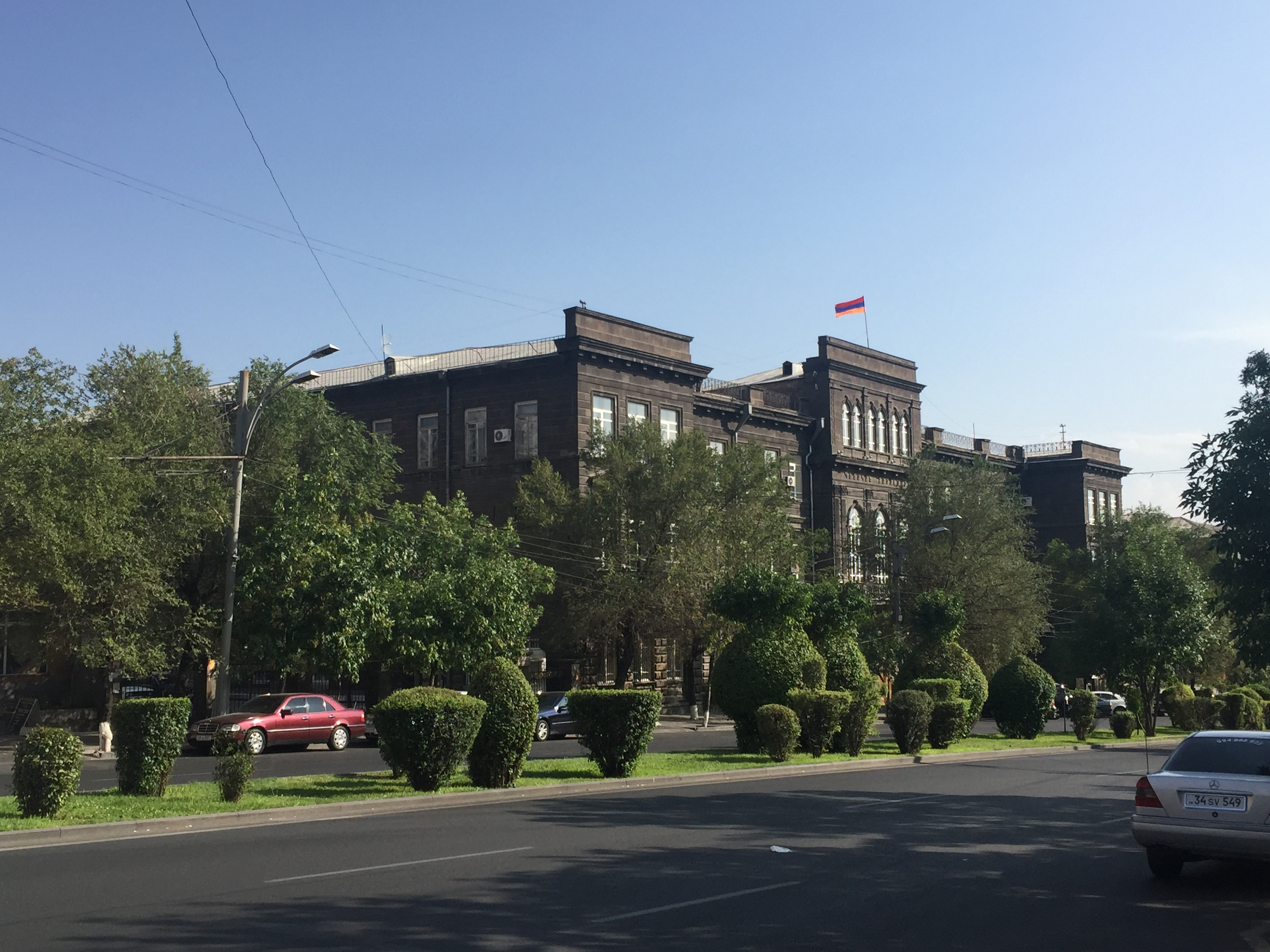
Yerevan State University building

In medieval times, the University of Gladzor and University of Tatev took an important role for Armenian education.

A literacy rate of 100% was reported as early as 1960. In the communist era, Armenian education followed the standard Soviet model of complete state control (from Moscow) of curricula and teaching methods and close integration of education activities with other aspects of society, such as politics, culture, and the economy.

In the 1988–89 school year, 301 students per 10,000 were in specialized secondary or higher education, a figure slightly lower than the Soviet average. In 1989, some 58% of Armenians over age fifteen had completed their secondary education, and 14% had a higher education. In the 1990–91 school year, the estimated 1,307 primary and secondary schools were attended by 608,800 students. Another seventy specialised secondary institutions had 45,900 students, and 68,400 students were enrolled in a total of ten postsecondary institutions that included universities. In addition, 35% of eligible children attended preschools. In 1992 Armenia's largest institution of higher learning, Yerevan State University, had eighteen departments, including ones for social sciences, sciences, and law. Its faculty numbered about 1,300 teachers and its student population about 10,000 students. The National Polytechnic University of Armenia is operating since 1933.

In the early 1990s, Armenia made substantial changes to the centralised and regimented Soviet system. Because at least 98% of students in higher education were Armenian, curricula began to emphasise Armenian history and culture. Armenian became the dominant language of instruction, and many schools that had taught in Russian closed by the end of 1991. Russian was still widely taught, however, as a second language.

In 2014, the National Programme for Educational Excellence embarked on creating an internationally competitive and academically rigorous alternative educational programme (the Araratian Baccalaureate) for Armenian schools and increasing the importance and status of the teacher's role in society.

The Ministry of Education and Science is responsible for regulation of the sector. Primary and secondary education in Armenia is free, and completion of secondary school is compulsory. Higher education in Armenia is harmonized with the Bologna process and the European Higher Education Area. The Armenian National Academy of Sciences plays an important role in postgraduate education.

Schooling takes 12 years in Armenia and breaks down into primary (4 years), middle (5 years) and high school (3 years). Schools engage a 10-grade mark system. The government also supports Armenian schools outside of Armenia.

Gross enrollment in tertiary education at 44% in 2015 surpassed peer countries of the South Caucasus but remained below the average for Europe and Central Asia. However, public spending per student in tertiary education in GDP-ratio terms is one of the lowest for post-USSR countries (for which data was available).

=== Health ===
Healthcare in Armenia has undergone significant changes since independence in 1991. Initially, the Soviet healthcare system was highly centralized and provided free medical assistance to all citizens. After independence, the healthcare system underwent reform and primary care services have been free of charge since 2006. Despite improvements in accessibility and the implementation of an Open Enrollment programme, out-of-pocket health expenditures remain high and corruption among healthcare professionals remains a concern. In 2019, healthcare became free for all citizens under the age of 18 and the number of people receiving free or subsidized care under the Basic Benefits Package was increased.

After a significant decline in earlier decades, crude (Note: Crude rates are not age-adjusted.) birth rates in Armenia slightly increased from 13.0 (per 1000 people) in the year 1998 to 14.2 in 2015; this timeframe also showed a similar trajectory in the crude death rate, which grew from 8.6 to 9.3. Life expectancy at birth at 74.8 years was the 4th-highest among the Post-Soviet states in 2014.

== Culture ==
=== Architecture ===
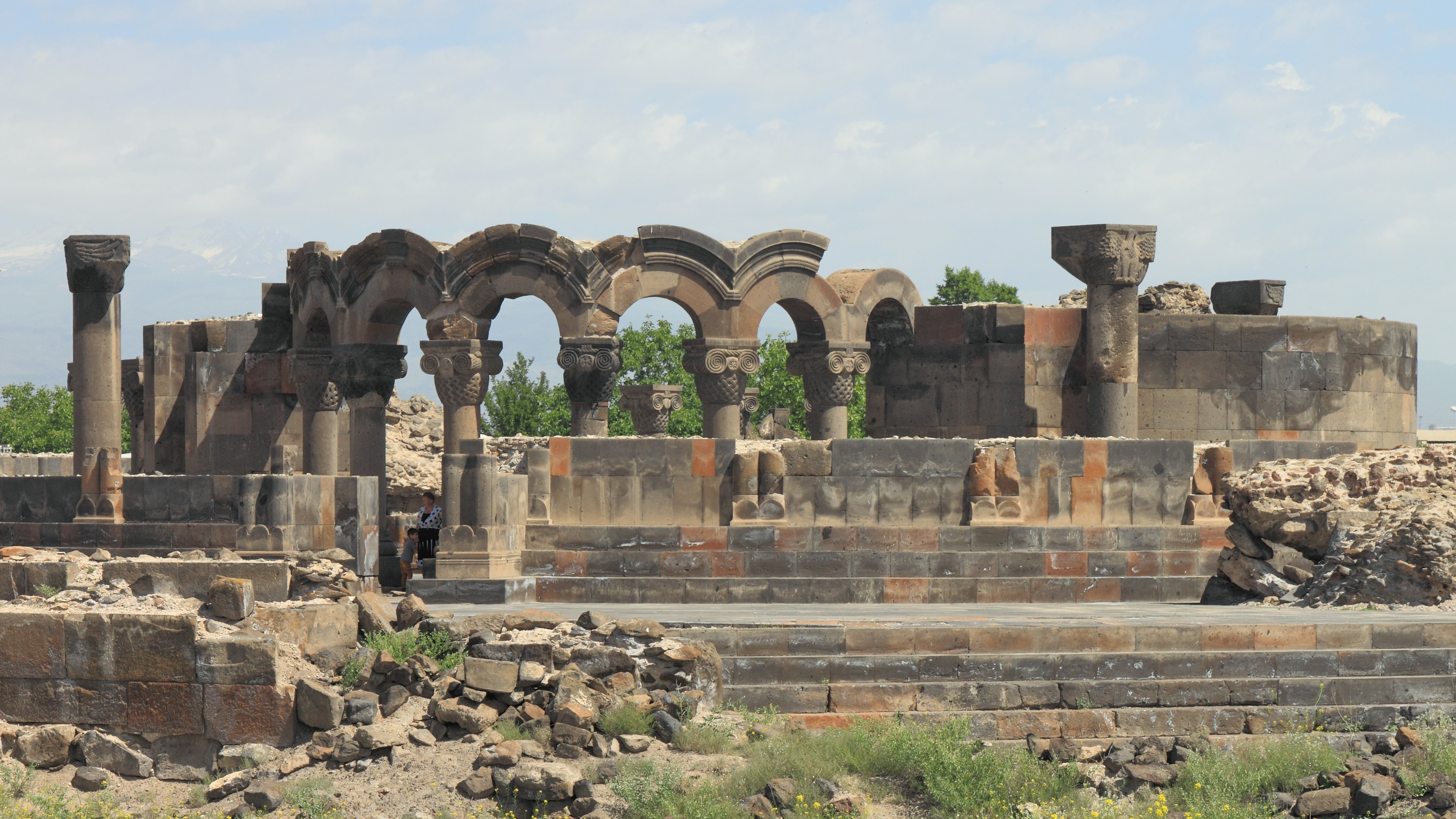
Zvartnots Cathedral, 643–652, UNESCO World Heritage Site

Armenian architecture, as it originates in an earthquake-prone region, tends to be built with this hazard in mind. Armenian buildings tend to be rather low-slung and thick-walled in design. Armenia has abundant resources of stone, and relatively few forests, so stone was nearly always used throughout for large buildings. Small buildings and most residential buildings were normally constructed of lighter materials, and hardly any early examples survive, as at the abandoned medieval capital of Ani.

=== Music and dance ===
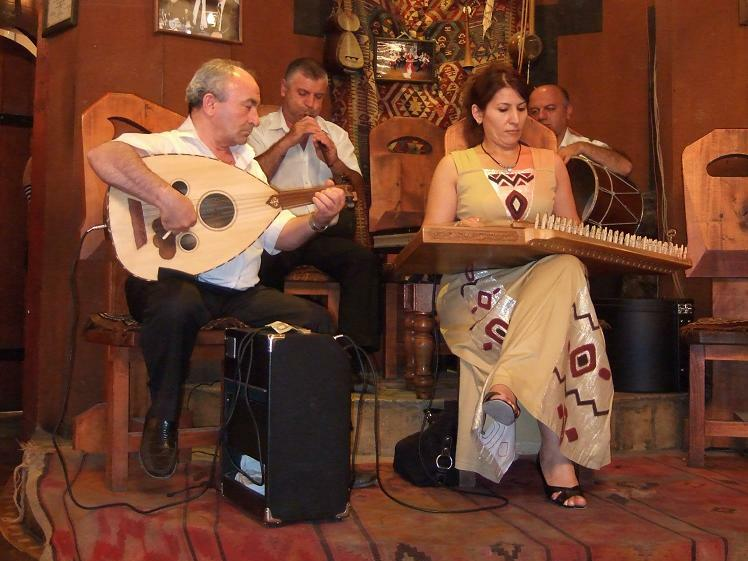
Armenian folk musicians

The duduk, dhol, zurna, and kanun are common instruments in Armenian folk music. The 18th century bard Sayat Nova influenced the development of Armenian folk music. Armenian chant is a common form of religious music in Armenia. Under Soviet rule, the Armenian composer Aram Khatchaturian became internationally known for his music, including the "Sabre Dance" from his composition for the ballet Gayane.

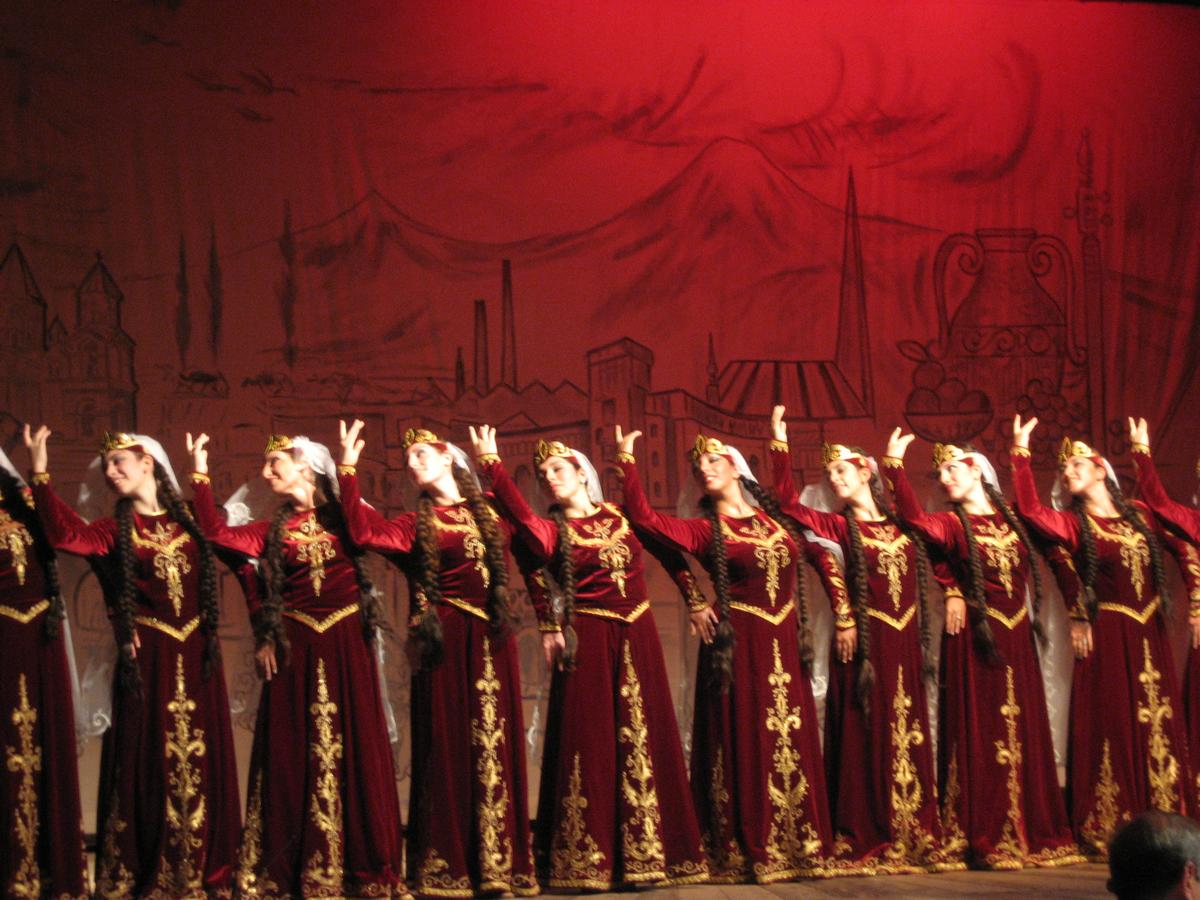
Traditional Armenian dance

=== Art ===
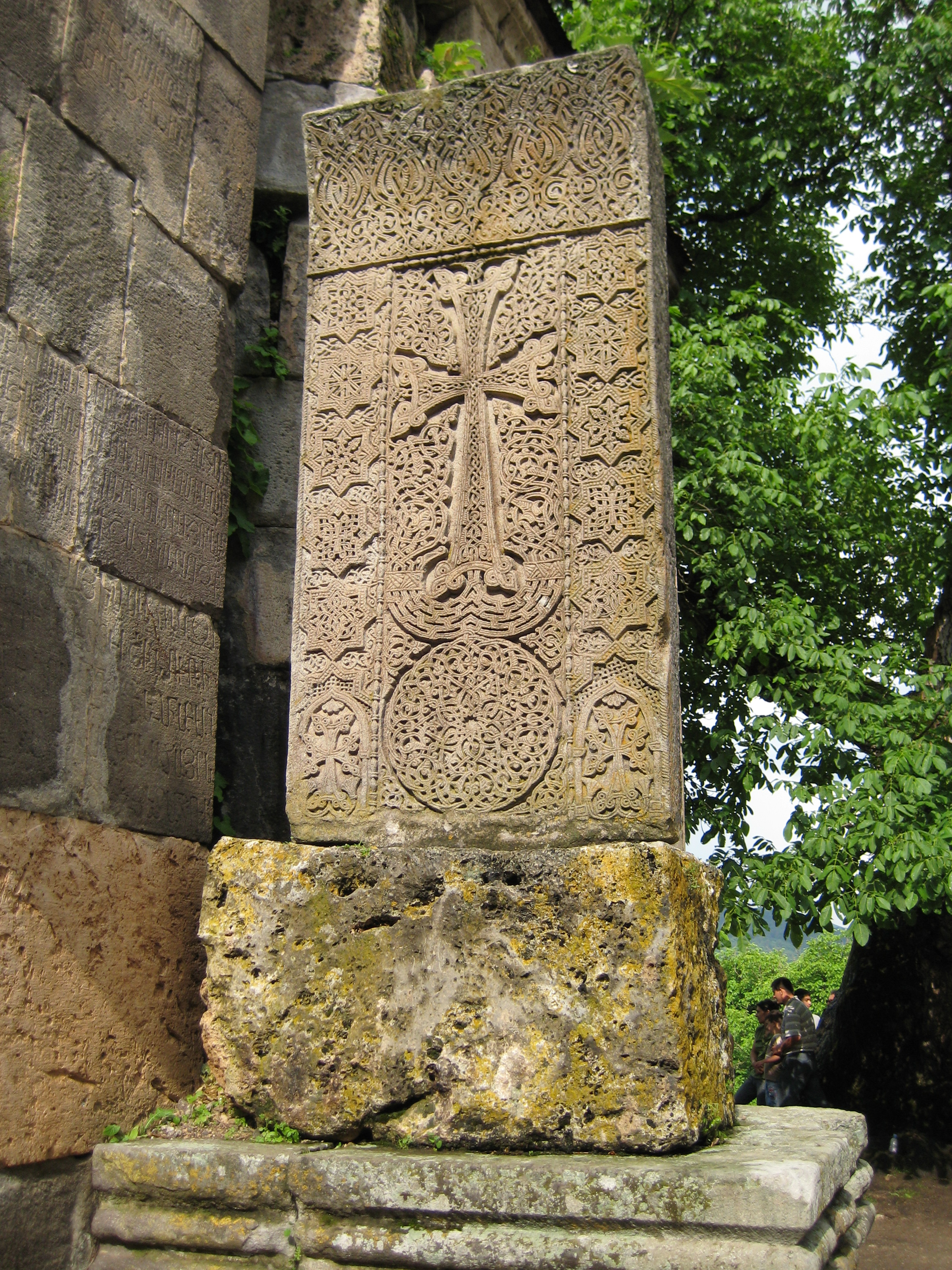
Ancient Armenian Khachkars (cross-stones)

Yerevan Vernissage (arts and crafts market), close to Republic Square, bustles with hundreds of vendors selling a variety of crafts on weekends and Wednesdays (though the selection is much reduced mid-week). The market offers woodcarving, antiques, fine lace, and the hand-knotted wool carpets and kilims that are a Caucasus speciality. Obsidian, which is found locally, is crafted into assortment of jewellery and ornamental objects. Armenian gold smithery enjoys a long tradition, populating one corner of the market with a selection of gold items. Soviet relics and souvenirs of recent Russian manufacture – nesting dolls, watches, enamel boxes and so on – are also available at the Vernissage.

Across from the Opera House, a popular art market fills another city park on the weekends. Armenia's long history as a crossroads of the ancient world has resulted in a landscape with numerous archaeological sites to explore. Medieval, Iron Age, Bronze Age and even Stone Age sites are all within a few hours' drive from the city. All but the most spectacular remain virtually undiscovered, allowing visitors to view churches and fortresses in their original settings.

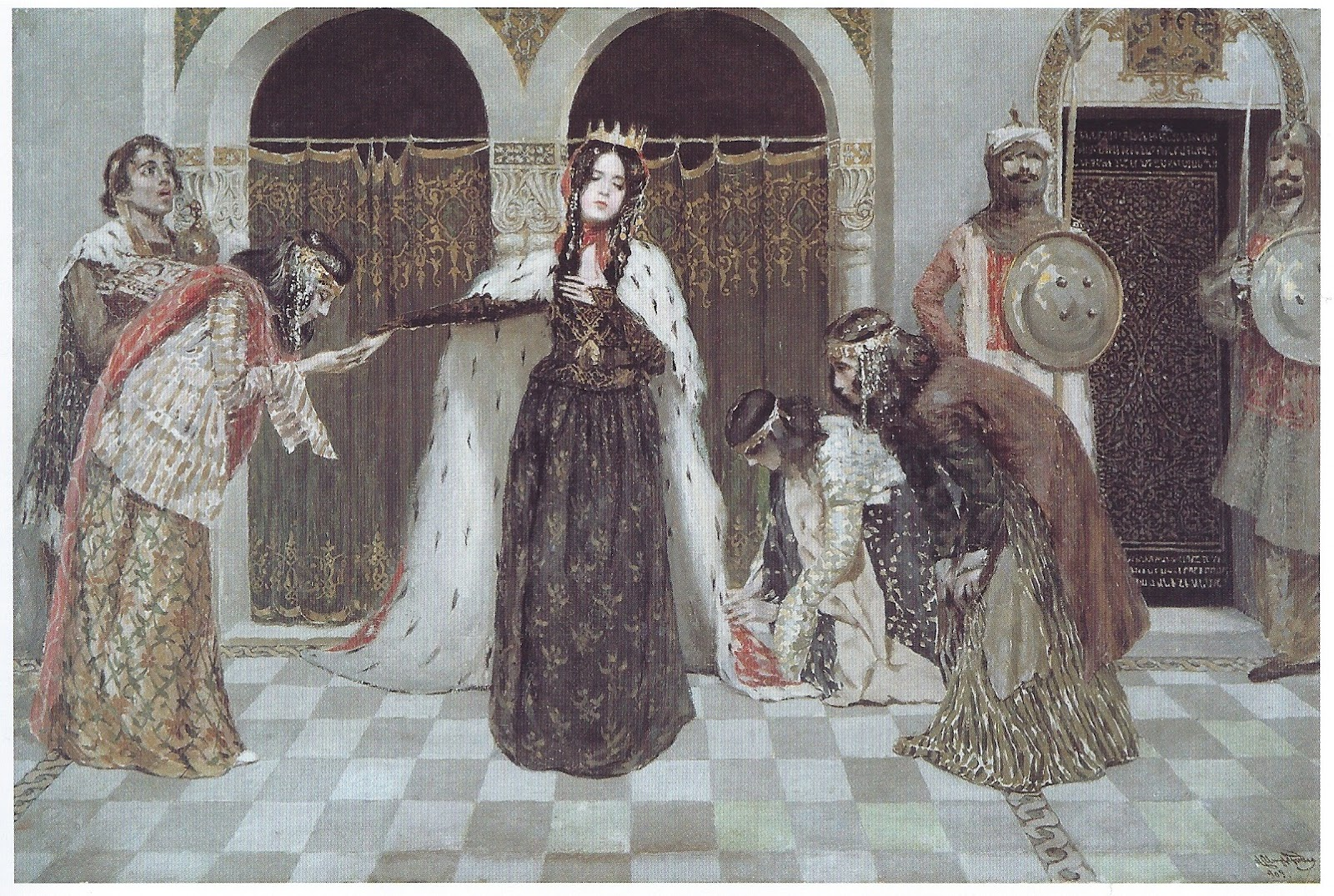
Queen Zabel's Return to the Palace, Vardges Sureniants (1909)

The National Art Gallery in Yerevan has more than 16,000 works that date back to the Middle Ages, which indicate Armenia's rich tales and stories of the times. It houses paintings by many European masters as well. The Modern Art Museum, the Children's Picture Gallery, and the Martiros Saryan Museum are only a few of the other noteworthy collections of fine art on display in Yerevan. Moreover, many private galleries are in operation, with many more opening every year, featuring rotating exhibitions and sales.

On 13 April 2013, the Armenian government announced a change in law to allow freedom of panorama for 3D works of art.

=== Media ===
Television, magazines, and newspapers are all operated by both state-owned and for-profit corporations which depend on advertising, subscription, and other sales-related revenues. The Constitution of Armenia guarantees freedom of speech and Armenia ranks 61st in the 2020 Press Freedom Index report compiled by Reporters Without Borders, between Georgia and Poland. Armenia's press freedom rose considerably following the 2018 Velvet Revolution.

As of 2020, the biggest issue facing press freedom in Armenia is judicial harassment of journalists, specifically defamation suits and attacks on journalists' right to protect sources, as well as excessive responses to combat disinformation spread by social media users. Reporters Without Borders also cites continued concerns about lack of transparency regarding ownership of media outlets.

=== Cinema ===
Cinema in Armenia was officially established on 16 April 1923, with the founding of the Armenian State Committee of Cinema by a decree of the Soviet Armenian government.

Prior to this, the first Armenian film, titled "Haykakan Sinema", was produced in 1912 in Cairo by Armenian-Egyptian publisher Vahan Zartarian and premiered on 13 March 1913.

In March 1924 the first Armenian film studio, Armenfilm, was established in Yerevan, beginning with the documentary film "Soviet Armenia".

"Namus" directed by Hamo Beknazarian in 1925, was the first Armenian silent black-and-white film. Based on Alexander Shirvanzade's 1885 novel, it portrays the tragic fate of two lovers whose engagement is thwarted due to violations of "namus" (a tradition of honor), leading the girl's father to marry her to another man.

The first Armenian sound film, "Pepo," was directed by Hamo Beknazarian in 1935.

=== Sport ===
Competitively, Armenia has been successful in chess, weightlifting and wrestling at the international level. Armenia is also an active member of the international sports community, with full membership in the Union of European Football Associations (UEFA) and International Ice Hockey Federation (IIHF). It also hosts the Pan-Armenian Games.

Prior to 1992, Armenians participated in the Olympics representing the USSR. As part of the Soviet Union, Armenia was very successful, winning plenty of medals and helping the USSR win the medal standings at the Olympics on numerous occasions. The first medal won by an Armenian in modern Olympic history was by Hrant Shahinyan (sometimes spelled as Grant Shaginyan), who won two golds and two silvers in gymnastics at the 1952 Summer Olympics in Helsinki. To highlight the level of success of Armenians in the Olympics, Shahinyan was quoted as saying:

"Armenian sportsmen had to outdo their opponents by several notches for the shot at being accepted into any Soviet team. But those difficulties notwithstanding, 90 percent of Armenian athletes on Soviet Olympic teams came back with medals."

Armenia first participated at the 1992 Summer Olympics in Barcelona under a unified CIS team, where it was very successful, winning three golds and one silver in weightlifting, wrestling and sharp shooting, despite only having five athletes. Since the 1994 Winter Olympics in Lillehammer, Armenia has participated as an independent nation.

Armenia participates in the Summer Olympic Games in boxing, wrestling, weightlifting, judo, gymnastics, track and field, diving, swimming and sharp shooting. It also participates in the Winter Olympic Games in alpine skiing, cross-country skiing and figure skating.

Football is also popular in Armenia. The most successful team was the FC Ararat Yerevan team of the 1970s who won the Soviet Cup in 1973 and 1975 and the Soviet Top League in 1973. The latter achievement saw FC Ararat gain entry to the European Cup where – despite a home victory in the second leg – they lost on aggregate at the quarter-final stage to eventual winner FC Bayern Munich. Armenia competed internationally as part of the USSR national football team until the Armenian national football team was formed in 1992 after the split of the Soviet Union. Armenia have never qualified for a major tournament although recent improvements saw the team to achieve 44th position in the FIFA World Rankings in September 2011. The national team is controlled by the Football Federation of Armenia. The Armenian Premier League is the highest level football competition in Armenia, and has been dominated by FC Pyunik in recent seasons. The league currently consists of eight teams and relegates to the Armenian First League.

Armenia and the Armenian diaspora have produced many successful footballers, including Henrikh Mkhitaryan, Youri Djorkaeff, Alain Boghossian, Andranik Eskandarian, Andranik Teymourian, Edgar Manucharyan, Khoren Oganesian and Nikita Simonyan. Djokaeff and Boghossian won the 1998 FIFA World Cup with France, Teymourian competed in the 2006 World Cup for Iran and Manucharyan played in the Dutch Eredivisie for Ajax. Mkhitaryan has been one of the most successful Armenian footballers in recent years, playing for international clubs such as Borussia Dortmund, Manchester United, Arsenal, A.S. Roma and currently for Inter Milan.

Wrestling has been a successful sport in the Olympics for Armenia. At the 1996 Summer Olympics in Atlanta, Armen Nazaryan won the gold in the Men's Greco-Roman Flyweight (52 kg) category and Armen Mkrtchyan won the silver in Men's Freestyle Paperweight (48 kg) category, securing Armenia's first two medals in its Olympic history.

Traditional Armenian wrestling is called Kokh and practised in traditional garb; it was one of the influences included in the Soviet combat sport of Sambo, which is also very popular.

The government of Armenia budgets about $2.8 million annually for sports and gives it to the National Committee of Physical Education and Sports, the body that determines which programmes should benefit from the funds.

Due to the lack of success lately on the international level, in recent years, Armenia has rebuilt 16 Soviet-era sports schools and furnished them with new equipment for a total cost of $1.9 million. The rebuilding of the regional schools was financed by the Armenian government. $9.3 million has been invested in the resort town of Tsaghkadzor to improve the winter sports infrastructure because of dismal performances at recent winter sports events. In 2005, a cycling centre was opened in Yerevan with the aim of helping produce world class Armenian cyclists. The government has also promised a cash reward of $700,000 to Armenians who win a gold medal at the Olympics.

Armenia has also been very successful in chess, winning the World Champion in 2011 and the World Chess Olympiad on three occasions.

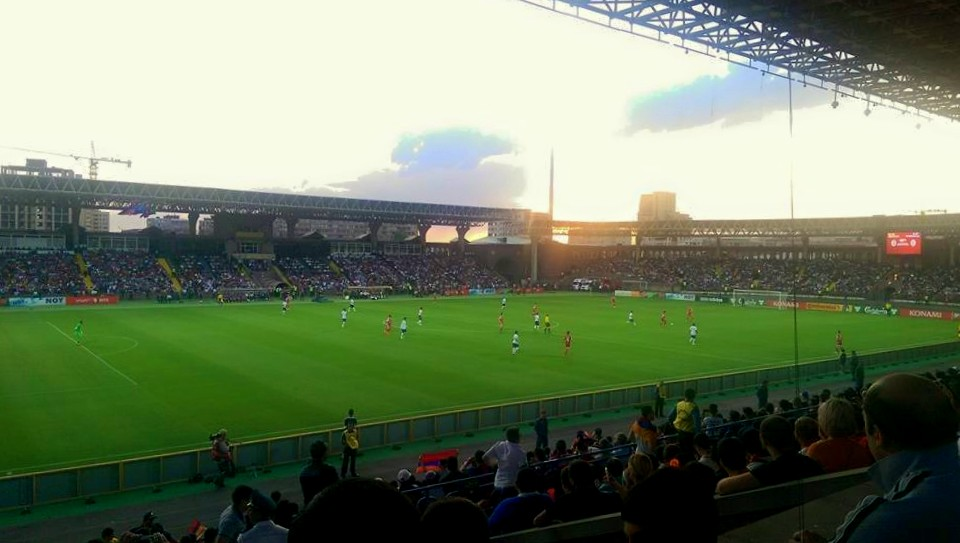
The Vazgen Sargsyan Republican Stadium in Yerevan

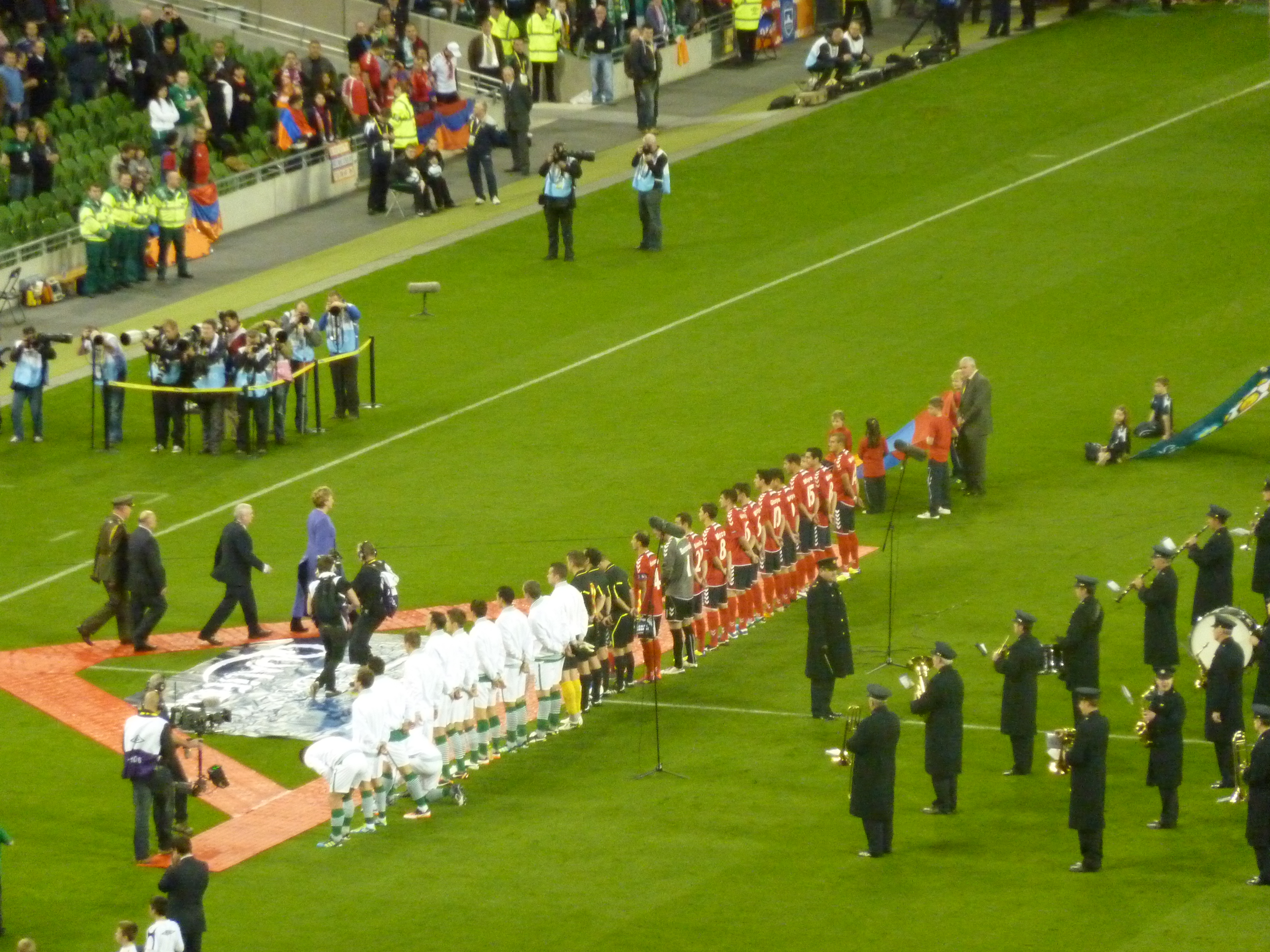
The Armenia national football team in Dublin, Ireland

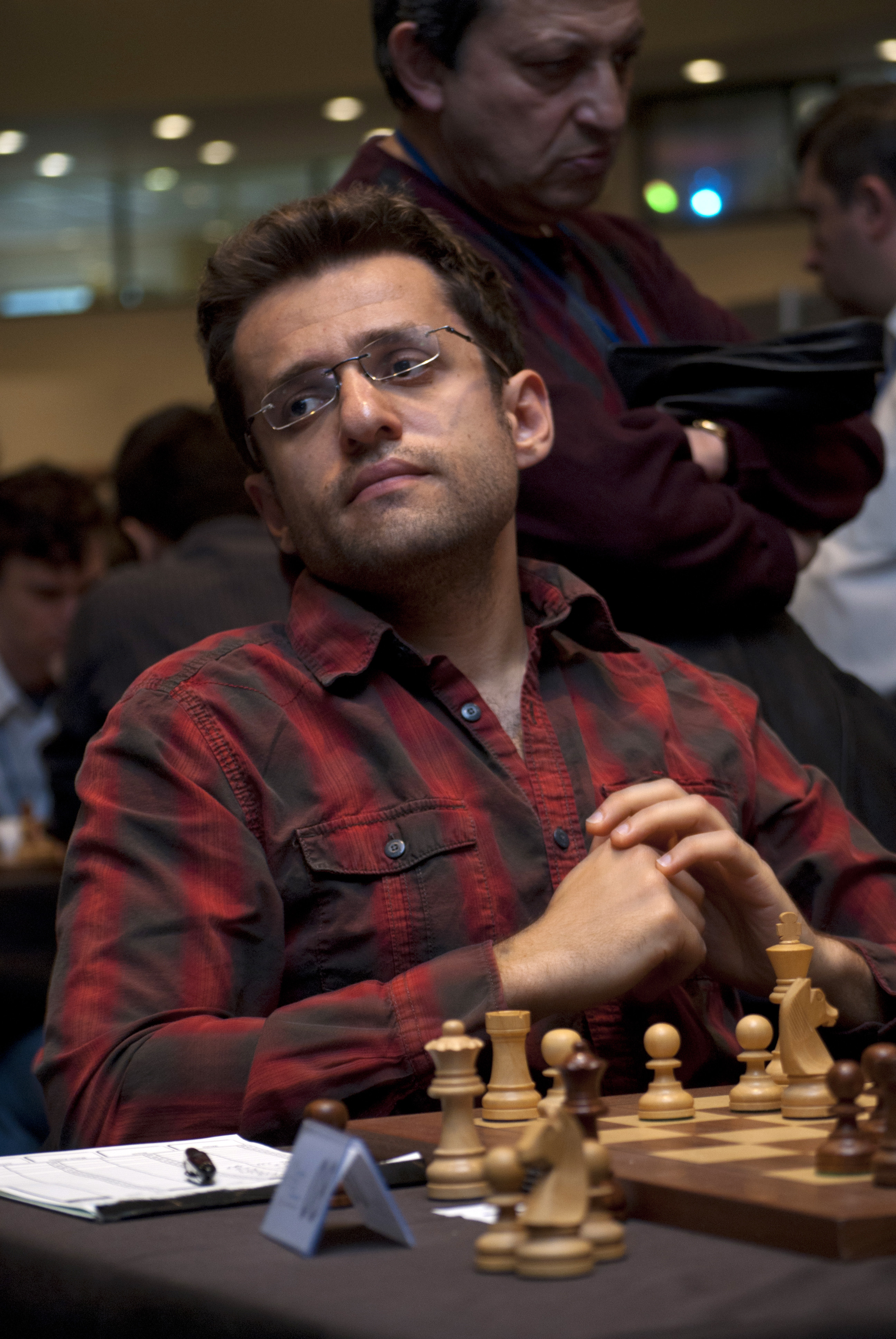
Chess Grandmaster Levon Aronian is a former FIDE No. 2 rated player and the fourth-highest rated player in history.

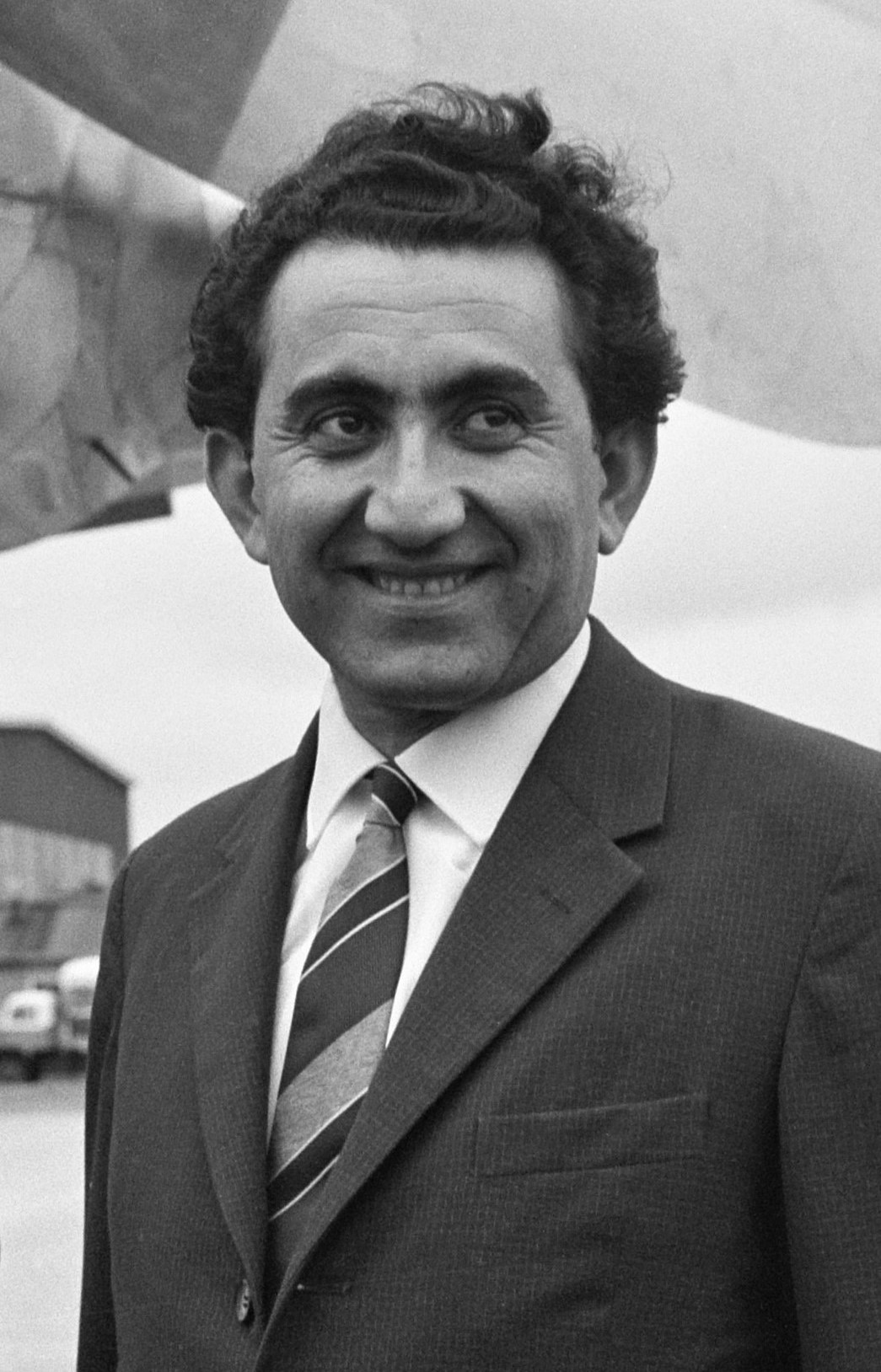
Tigran Petrosyan, 9th World Chess Champion

== See also ==
- Outline of Armenia

== Source attribution ==
- This article incorporates text from a free content work. Licensed under CC BY-SA IGO 3.0. Text taken from UNESCO Science Report: Towards 2030, 324–26, UNESCO, UNESCO Publishing.

== Works cited ==
- Alpi, Federico; Meyer, Robin; Tinti, Irene; Zakarian, David, eds. (2022). Armenia through the Lens of Time. Brill. ISBN 9789004527607.
- Badalyan Riegg, Stephen (2020). Russia's Entangled Embrace: The Tsarist Empire and the Armenians, 1801–1914. Ithaca, NY: Cornell University Press. ISBN 978-1501750113.
- Bournoutian, George A. (2018). Armenia and Imperial Decline: The Yerevan Province, 1900–1914. London: Routledge. ISBN 978-1138480575.
- Bournoutian, George A. (2006). A Concise History of the Armenian People (5th ed.). Costa Mesa, CA: Mazda. ISBN 1568591411.
- Canard, Marius & Cahen, Claude (1960). "Armīniya". In Gibb, H. A. R.; Kramers, J. H.; Lévi-Provençal, E.; Schacht, J.; Lewis, B. & Pellat, Ch. (eds.). The Encyclopaedia of Islam, Second Edition. Volume I: A–B. Leiden: E. J. Brill. pp. 634–640. OCLC 495469456.
- Gevorgyan, Valentina; Antonyan, Yulia, eds. (2024). Armenia after 2018: Social and Political Transformations. Peter Lang. ISBN 9783034348065.
- Hacikyan, Agop J.; Basmajian, Gabriel; Franchuk, Edward S.; Ouzounian, Nourhan, eds. (2000). The Heritage of Armenian Literature: From the Oral Tradition to the Golden Age. Vol. 1. Detroit: Wayne State University Press. ISBN 978-0-8143-2815-6.
- Hewsen, Robert H. (2001). Armenia: A Historical Atlas. Chicago: University of Chicago Press. ISBN 978-0-226-33228-4.
- Hovannisian, Richard G. (1996b). The Republic of Armenia. Vol. 4: Between Crescent and Sickle: Partition and Sovietization. Berkeley: University of California Press. ISBN 978-0520088047.
- Kévorkian, Raymond (2011). The Armenian Genocide: A Complete History. London: I. B.Tauris. ISBN 978-1848855618.
- Panossian, Razmik (2006). The Armenians: From Kings and Priests to Merchants and Commissars. New York: Columbia University Press. ISBN 978-0231139267.
- Payaslian, Simon (2007). The History of Armenia: From the Origins to the Present. New York: Palgrave Macmillan. ISBN 978-0-230-60858-0.
- Saparov, Arsène (2015). From Conflict to Autonomy in the Caucasus: The Soviet Union and the Making of Abkhazia, South Ossetia and Nagorno Karabakh. London: Routledge. ISBN 978-1-317-63783-7.
- Shakarian, Pietro A. (2025). Anastas Mikoyan: An Armenian Reformer in Khrushchev's Kremlin. Bloomington: Indiana University Press. ISBN 978-0253073556.
- Suny, Ronald Grigor (1993). Looking toward Ararat: Armenia in Modern History. Bloomington: Indiana University Press. ISBN 978-0-253-20773-9.
- Tsutsiev, Arthur (2014). Atlas of the Ethno-Political History of the Caucasus (PDF). Translated by Nora Seligman Favorov. New Haven: Yale University Press. ISBN 9780300153088. Archived (PDF) from the original on 17 June 2023.
- Walker, Christopher J. (1990). Armenia: The Survival of a Nation (2nd ed.). New York: St. Martin's Press. ISBN 978-0312042301.
