= Origin of the Armenians =

Ethnogenesis

The origin of the Armenians is a topic concerned with the emergence of the Armenian people and the country called Armenia. The earliest universally accepted reference to the people and the country dates back to the 6th century BC Behistun Inscription, followed by several Greek fragments and books. The earliest known reference to a geopolitical entity where Armenians originated from is dated to the 13th century BC as Uruatri in Old Assyrian. Historians and Armenologists have speculated about the earlier origin of the Armenian people, but no consensus has been achieved as of yet. Genetic studies show that Armenian people are indigenous to historical Armenia, showing little to no signs of admixture since around the 13th century BC.

== Genetic origins ==
Recent studies have shown that Armenians are indigenous to the Armenian Highlands and form a distinct genetic isolate in the region. Analyses of mitochondrial ancient DNA of skeletons from Armenia spanning 7,800 years, including DNA from Neolithic, Bronze Age, Urartian, classical and medieval Armenian skeletons, have revealed that modern Armenians have the least genetic distance to them compared to neighboring peoples such as Turks and Azerbaijani Turks, but followed closely by Georgians. Armenians are also one of the genetic isolates of West Asia. There are signs of considerable genetic admixture in Armenians between 3000 BC and 2000 BC but they subside to insignificant levels since 1200 BC, remaining stable until today.

=== Analysis of ancient DNA ===
In a study published in 2017, the complete mitochondrial genomes of 52 ancient skeletons from present-day Armenia spanning 7,800 years were analyzed and combined with 206 mitochondrial genomes of modern Armenians and previously published data of seven neighboring populations (482 people).

Period	Samples
Neolithic	3
Chalcolithic	1
Kura–Araxes	6
Trialeti–Vanadzor	5
Lchashen–Metsamor	29
Urartu	4
Classical / Medieval	4
Modern	211

Coalescence-based analyses suggest that the population size in the region rapidly increased after the Last Glacial Maximum around 18,000 years ago. During the Bronze and Iron ages, many complex societies emerged from distinctive cultures such as Kura–Araxes, Trialeti–Vanadzor, Sevan–Artsakh, Karmir Berd, Karmir Vank', Lchashen–Metsamor, and Urartian. No changes in the female gene pool could be documented, supporting a cultural diffusion model in the region (the spread of cultural items—such as ideas, styles, religions, technologies, languages—between individuals, whether within a single culture or from one culture to another).

The study sampled 44 ancient human skeletons according to established aDNA guidelines from a total of 19 archaeological sites in Armenia and Artsakh. Based on contextual dating of artifacts, their ages are estimated to be between 300 and 7,800 years old, which covers seven well-defined cultural transitions.

The study shows that modern Armenians have the lowest genetic distance between the ancient individuals in this dataset—followed closely by Georgians—compared to other populations such as Turks, Persians, and Azerbaijanis.

=== Affinity with Neolithic farmers ===
According to a study published in 2015, in which a genome-wide variation in 173 Armenians was analyzed and compared to 78 other worldwide populations, Armenians form a distinct genetic cluster linking West Asia, Europe, and the Caucasus.

The genetic landscape in West Asia had more affinity to Neolithic Europe than the present populations do. Armenians seem to share a similar affinity to those Neolithic farmers as do other genetic isolates in West Asia, such as Greek Cypriots, Mizrahi Jews, and Middle Eastern Christian communities. This suggests that they may derive from a people who inhabited the West Asia during the Neolithic expansion of West Asian farmers into Europe beginning around 8,000 years ago.

An earlier study from 2011 has also shown a prevalence of Neolithic paternal chromosomes associated with the Agricultural Revolution. Collectively, they constitute 77% of the observed paternal lineages in the Armenian Plateau — 58% in Sason and an average of 84% in Ararat Valley, Gardman and Lake Van.

=== Admixture during the Bronze Age ===
Bronze Age demographic processes had a major impact on the genetics of populations in the Armenian Highlands. Armenians appear to originate from a mixture of diverse populations occurring from 3000 BC to 2000 BC. This period coincides with the Kura-Araxes culture, the appearance of Hittites in Anatolia, major population migrations after the domestication of the horse, and the appearance of chariots. It also coincides with the legendary foundation of the Armenian nation in 2492 BC. According to the A genetic atlas of human admixture history published by Hellenthal et al. in 2014, admixture is not inferred or is uncertain.

Up until recently, it was hypothesized that the Armenian people migrated from the Balkans into the Armenian Highlands, based on a passage by Herodotus in the 5th century BC claiming a kinship between Armenians and Phrygians. However, the results of a 2020 study on Armenian genetics "strongly reject" this long-standing narrative, and shows that Armenians are genetically distinct from the ancient populations of the Balkans.

As was concluded in earlier studies, the 2020 study reaffirms the pattern of genetic affinity between modern Armenians and the ancient inhabitants of the Armenian Highlands since the Chalcolithic. It reveals a "strikingly high" level of regional genetic continuity for over 6,000 years with only one detectable input from a mysterious Sardinian-like people during or just after the middle to late Bronze Age. Modern Sardinians, having the highest genetic affinity to early European farmers who migrated into Europe from Anatolia and introduced farming around 8,000 years ago, have 38–44% of ancestry from an Iranian, Steppe, and North-African-related source. However, no detectable signs of input from sources similar to Anatolian farmers or Iranians were detected that may have altered the gene pool of the population of the Armenian Highlands. The input plausibly came by northwards migrations from West Asia rather than the isolated island of Sardinia, but no conclusions have been made about the identity of the migrating peoples as of yet, nor whether the cause was cultural or climatic.

Starting from around 1200 BC, during the Late Bronze Age collapse, around the time when the Nairi tribal confederation and Urartu begin appearing in historical records, signs of admixture decrease to insignificant levels until today. It seems that widespread destruction and abandonment of major cities and trade routes caused the Armenians' isolation from their surroundings, and their adoption of a distinct culture and identity early on in their history genetically isolated them from major admixture throughout the following millennia.

Recent genetic and linguistic research has suggested that Armenian, along with Greek and Albanian, are connected to the Yamnaya culture of the Pontic–Caspian steppe and Caucasus, whereas all other existent branches of Indo-European were mediated through Corded Ware culture.

=== Modern genetic structure ===
West Asia's genetic landscape appears to have been continuously changing since the Bronze Age. There is a sub-Saharan African gene flow around 850 years ago in Syrians, Palestinians, and Jordanians consistent with previous reports of recent gene flow from Africans to Levantine populations after the Arab expansions. There is also an East Asian ancestry in Turks from admixture occurring around 800 years ago coinciding with the arrival of the Seljuk Turks to Anatolia from their homelands near the Aral sea. The introduction of these populations doesn't seem to have affected Armenians significantly. Around 500 years ago, a genetic structure within the population appears to have developed, which coincides with a period when the Armenian people were divided between the Ottoman Empire and the successive Iranian empires.

Most common haplogroups in Armenians
Y-DNA (male)	mtDNA (female)
R1b1	H
J2	U
G	J
J1	HV
E1b1b1	T
T	K
I2	N
L	I
R1a	X
Q1	W
R2a	R
F	V
A	F
	C

== Earliest attestations ==
Armenia and the Armenians were attested multiple times at the end of the Iron Age and the onset of Classical Antiquity.

=== Possible mention in Luwian inscriptions ===
Armenians (as "Hai") were possibly mentioned in the 10th century BC Hieroglyphic Luwian inscriptions from Carchemish.

=== Behistun Inscription ===
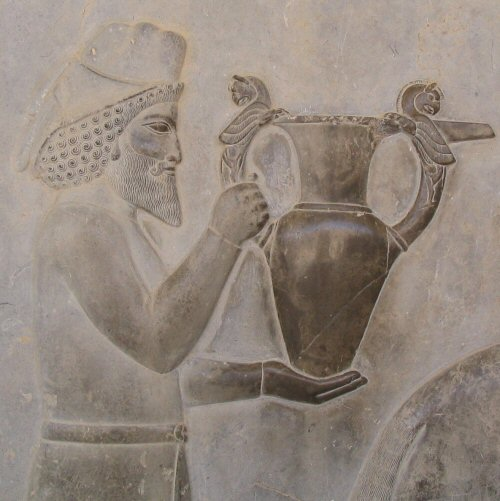
An Armenian tribute bearer (Behistun Inscription)

The earliest record of what can unambiguously be identified as Armenian dates back to the trilingual Behistun Inscription, authored sometime after c. 522 BC, in reference to a country and the people associated with it. The following table breaks down the attestation in the three languages it was written in:

Attestation of "Armenia" and "Armenians" in the Behistun Inscription
	Old Persian		Elamite		Babylonian Akkadian	
	Country	People	Country	People	Country	People
Cuneiform	𐎠𐎼𐎷𐎡𐎴	𐎠𐎼𐎷𐎡𐎴𐎹				
Transliteration	a-r-mi-i-n(a)	a-r-mi-i-n-y(a)	ḫar-mi-nu-ia	ḫar-mi-nu-ia-ip	^{KUR}ú-ra-áš-ṭu	^{LU}ú-ra-áš-ṭa-a-a
Translation	Armenia	Armenians	Armenia	Armenians	Urartu	Urartians

The inscriptions chronicle Darius the Great's battles and conquests during the first Persian Empire. Multiple Armenian people were mentioned in them:

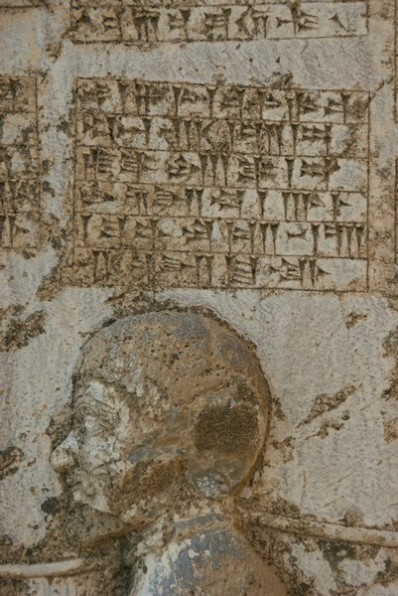
Relief of Arakha: "This is Arakha. He lied, saying: 'I am Nebuchadnezzar, the son of Nabonidus. I am king in Babylon'."

- Dadarsi (or Dādṛšiš/Dadrshish), a satrap and commander who served Darius and quelled rebellions, including several in Armenia.
- Arakha (or Araḫa), 126th king of Babylon who rebelled against Darius (he claimed to be Nebuchadnezzar IV son of Nabonidus).
- Khaldita (or Ḫaldita), the supposed biological father of Arakha.
- Various other unnamed Armenian rebels, hosts, armies, and leaders who rejected Darius' authority in Armenia.

In the Babylonian Akkadian version, these people are referred to as Urartians.

=== Hecataeus ===
The earliest known attestation in the Greek language is from a fragment attributed to Greek historian Hecataeus of Miletus, which in some sources is dated to prior to the Behistun Inscription. In it, he mentions the Chalybes people in Pontus, past the Thermōdōn River, with Armenians as their southern neighbors:

Χάλυβες, περὶ τὸν Πόντον ἔθνος ἐπὶ τῷ Θερμώδοντι, περὶ ὧν Εὔδοξος ἐν πρώτῳ ... Καὶ Χάλυβοι παρ ̓ Ἑκαταίῳ· «Χαλύβοισι πρὸς νότον Ἀρμένιοι δμουρέουσι.»

— Hecataeus of Miletus (c. 525–500 BC), Fragmenta historicorum Graecorum ...: Apollodori Bibliotheca cum fragmentis, Volume 1, p. 13, no. 195

=== Xerxes I ===
Xerxes I was king of Achaemenid Persia following the reign of his father, Darius the Great, who authored the Behistun Inscription. Xerxes authored an inscription in the Achaemenid province of Armenia sometime between 486 and 465 BC, located in modern-day Van, Turkey. The inscription is also written three languages — in Old Persian, Elamite, and in the Babylonian dialect of Akkadian — and is the last known encounter of the name Urartu/Urashtu in reference to the Armenia.

=== Herodotus ===
Herodotus mentions the Armenian people multiple times in his book The Histories:

Next to the Cilicians, are the Armenians, another people rich in flocks, and after the Armenians, the Matieni, […]

— Herodotus, The Histories, Book 5, Chapter 49 (c. 440 BC)

Herodotus also lists the ethnic groups in the Persian army, and claims that Armenians are settlers from Phrygia. However, this is an etiological tag added by the ethnographer responsible for the list who felt an obligation to explain where each of the ethnic groups came from — the ancient Armenians themselves seem to have no knowledge of their ancestors' migration from Phrygia.

The Phrygian equipment was very similar to the Paphlagonian, with only a small difference. As the Macedonians say, these Phrygians were called Briges as long as they dwelt in Europe, where they were neighbors of the Macedonians; but when they changed their home to Asia, they changed their name also and were called Phrygians. The Armenians, who are settlers from Phrygia, were armed like the Phrygians. Both these together had as their commander Artochmes, who had married a daughter of Darius.

— Herodotus, The Histories, Book 7, Chapter 73 (c. 440 BC)

This passage has often been cited to explain the origin of the Armenians and the introduction of the Proto-Armenian language into the South Caucasus region. However, the latest studies in linguistics show that the Armenian language is as close to Indo-Iranian as it is to Graeco-Phrygian. Additionally, archaeological research does not indicate a movement of people from Europe into Armenia, nor do the latest studies in genetics, with the latest study rejecting the narrative altogether.

=== Xenophon ===
In his book about Cyrus, the first Emperor of Persia, Xenophon writes about a conversation between Cyrus and the King of Armenia regarding a past war between Armenians and the Medes led by Astyages (events prior to the ones mentioned in the Behistun Inscriptions):

When everything was in order, he began his examination: "King of Armenia," said he, "I advise you in the first place in this trial to tell the truth, that you may be guiltless of that offence which is hated more cordially than any other. For let me assure you that being caught in a barefaced lie stands most seriously in the way of a man's receiving any mercy. In the next place," said he, "your children and your wives here and also the Armenians present are cognizant of everything that you have done; and if they hear you telling anything else than the facts, they will think that you are actually condemning your own self to suffer the extreme penalty, if ever I discover the truth."

"Well, Cyrus," said he, "ask what you will, and be assured that I will tell the truth, let happen what will as a result of it."

"Tell me then," said the other, "did you ever have a war with Astyages, my mother's father, and with the rest of the Medes?"

"Yes," he answered, "I did."

"And when you were conquered by him, did you agree to pay tribute and to join his army, wherever he should command you to go, and to own no forts?"

"Those are the facts."

— Xenophon, Cyropaedia, book 3, chapter 1, sections 9–10 (c. 370 BC)

=== Strabo ===
In reference to a time ancient to him, Strabo mentions Armenia facing Syria (Ancient Greek for Assyria) and ruling the whole of Asia (probably meaning West Asia) until its authority was diminished by the time of Astyages of the Median Empire (r. 585–550 BC) at the hand of Cyrus of the Persian Empire (r. 559–530 BC), after which it maintained its "ancient dignity":

In ancient times Greater Armenia ruled the whole of Asia, after it broke up the empire of the Syrians, but later, in the time of Astyages, it was deprived of that great authority by Cyrus and the Persians, although it continued to preserve much of its ancient dignity; and Ecbatana was winter residence for the Persian kings, and likewise for the Macedonians who, after overthrowing the Persians, occupied Syria; and still today it affords the kings of the Parthians the same advantages and security.

— Strabo, Geographica, Book 11, chapter 13, section 5 (between c. 20 BC–23 AD)

== Historiography ==
Historians and Armenologists have attempted to explain the origin of the Armenian people, but nothing conclusive has been discovered as of yet. The current consensus is that the Armenian people emerged as the result of amalgamation between the various peoples who inhabited the mountainous region known in the Iron Age by various forms of the name Urartu (a.k.a., Uruatri, Urashtu, and Ararat). The process of amalgamation is presumed to have been accelerated by the formation of Urartu and completed in succeeding Armenian realms.

Academics have also considered the etymological roots of the stems Armen- and Hay-, from which derive the modern endonym and exonym of Armenia and Armenians, in order to propose candidates for groups (i.e., Proto-Armenians) who may have contributed to the Armenian ethnogenesis. These propositions are purely speculative and are largely based on geographic proximity, similarity between names, linguistics, and extrapolations made from known historical events of the time.

The following cultures, peoples and polities have all been suggested to have contributed to the ethnogenesis of the Armenian people.

=== Prehistoric cultures ===
There is evidence of Neolithic, Chalcolithic, and Bronze Age cultures in lands historically and presently inhabited by Armenian people, dating to about 4000 BC. Archaeological surveys in 2010 and 2011 at the Areni-1 cave complex have resulted in the discovery of the world's earliest known leather shoe, skirt, and wine-producing facility.

From 2200 BC to 1600 BC, the Trialeti–Vanadzor culture flourished in Armenia, southern Georgia, and northeastern Turkey. It has been speculated that this was an Indo-European culture. and that it could have been Proto-Armenian-speaking. Other possibly related cultures were spread throughout the Armenia Highlands during this time, namely in the Aragats and Lake Sevan regions.

=== Armani and Subartu ===
Early 20th-century scholars suggested that the name "Armenia" may have possibly been recorded for the first time on an inscription which mentions Armani (or Armânum) together with Ibla, from territories conquered by Naram-Sin (2300 BC) identified with an Akkadian colony in the current region of Diyarbekir; however, the precise locations of both Armani and Ibla are unclear. Some modern researchers have placed Armani (Armi) in the general area of modern Samsat, and have suggested it was populated, at least partially, by an early Indo-European-speaking people. Today, the Modern Assyrians (who traditionally speak Neo-Aramaic, not Akkadian) refer to the Armenians by the name Armani. Thutmose III of Egypt, in the 33rd year of his reign (1446 BCE), mentioned as the people of "Ermenen", claiming that in their land "heaven rests upon its four pillars". Armenia is possibly connected to Mannaea, which may be identical to the region of Minni mentioned in The Bible. However, what all these attestations refer to cannot be determined with certainty.

=== Hayasa-Azzi ===
Hittite inscriptions deciphered in the 1920s by the Swiss scholar Emil Forrer testify to the existence of a mountain country, the Hayasa and/or the Azzi, lying around Lake Van. Several prominent authorities agree in placing Azzi to the north of Ishuwa. Others see Hayasa and Azzi as identical.

Records of the time between Telipinu and Tudhaliya III are sketchy. The Hittites seem to have abandoned their capital at Hattusa and moved to Sapinuwa under one of the earlier Tudhaliya kings. In the early 14th century BC, Sapinuwa was burned as well. Hattusili III records at this time that the Azzi had "made Samuha its frontier." The modern Georgian term somekhi 'Armenian' may ultimately derive from Samuha.

=== Phrygians and Mushki ===
One of the common theories for the introduction of the Armenian language into the Armenian Highlands, originating from Herodotus' claim that Armenians were Phrygian settlers, is that it had arrived via Phrygians and/or a related peoples known as the Mushki, as Paleo-Balkan-speaking settlers retroactively named Armeno-Phrygians, who had already settled in the western parts of the region prior to the establishment of Urartu, and became the ruling elite under the Median Empire, followed by the Achaemenid Empire. According to Igor Diakonoff, the Mushki were a Thraco-Phrygian group who carried their Proto-Armenian language from the Balkans across Asia Minor, mixing with Hurrians (and Urartians) and Luwians along the way. Diakonoff theorized that the root of the name Mushki was "Mush" (or perhaps "Mus," "Mos," or "Mosh") with the addition of the Armenian plural suffix -k'. Armen Petrosyan clarifies this, suggesting that -ki was a Proto-Armenian form of the Classical Armenian -k' and etymologizes "Mush" as meaning "worker" or "agriculturalist."

However, despite Diakonoff's claims, the connection between the Mushki and Armenian languages is unknown and some modern scholars have rejected a direct linguistic relationship if the Mushki were Thracians or Phrygians. Additionally, genetic research does not support significant admixture into the Armenian nation after 1200 BCE, making the Mushki, if they indeed migrated from a Balkan or western Anatolian homeland during or after the Bronze Age Collapse, unlikely candidates for the Proto-Armenians. However, as others have placed (at least the Eastern) Mushki homeland in the Armenian Highlands and South Caucasus region, it is possible that at least some of the Mushki were Armenian-speakers or speakers of a closely related language.

It has been speculated that the Mushki (and their allies, the Urumu) were connected to the spread of the so-called Transcaucasian ceramic ware, which appeared as far west as modern Elazig, Turkey in the late second millennium BCE. This ceramic ware is believed to have been developed in the South Caucasus region, possibly by the Trialeti-Vanadzor culture originally, which suggests an eastern homeland for the Mushki.

Pliny in the 1st century AD mentions the Moscheni in southern Armenia ("Armenia" at the time stretching south and west to the Mediterranean, bordering on Cappadocia). In Byzantine historiography, Moschoi was a name equivalent to or considered as the ancestors of "Cappadocians" (Eusebius) with their capital at Mazaca (later Caesarea Mazaca, modern Kayseri). According to Armenian tradition, the city of Mazaca was founded by and named after Mishak (Misak, Moshok), a cousin and general of the legendary patriarch Aram. Scholars have proposed a connection between the name Mishak and Mushki.

The Armenian region of Moks and the city of Mush, Turkey may derive their names from the Mushki.

According to Professor James R. Russell of Harvard University, the Georgian designation for Armenians Somekhi, preserves the old name of the Mushki. However, there are other theories regarding the origins of this exonym as well.

=== Urartu ===
Urartu (a.k.a. Ararat, Urashtu) is the geographic name used during the Iron Age for the region that would later be known as the Armenian Highlands. The polity that emerged in the region as a confederation of tribes was the Kingdom of Van, which was centered around Lake Van in modern-day Turkey. The kingdom rose to power in the mid-9th century BC, but went into gradual decline and was eventually conquered by the Iranian Medes in the early 6th century BC. The geopolitical region would re-emerge as Armenia shortly after. Being heirs to the Urartian realm, the earliest identifiable ancestors of the Armenians are the peoples of Urartu.

The Urartian confederation united the disparate peoples of the highlands, which began a process of intermingling of the peoples and cultures (including possibly Armenian tribes) and languages (potentially including proto-Armenian) within the highlands. This intermixing would ultimately culminate in the emergence of the Armenians as the dominant polity and culture of the Armenian Highlands, and as the direct successors and inheritors of the Urartian domain.

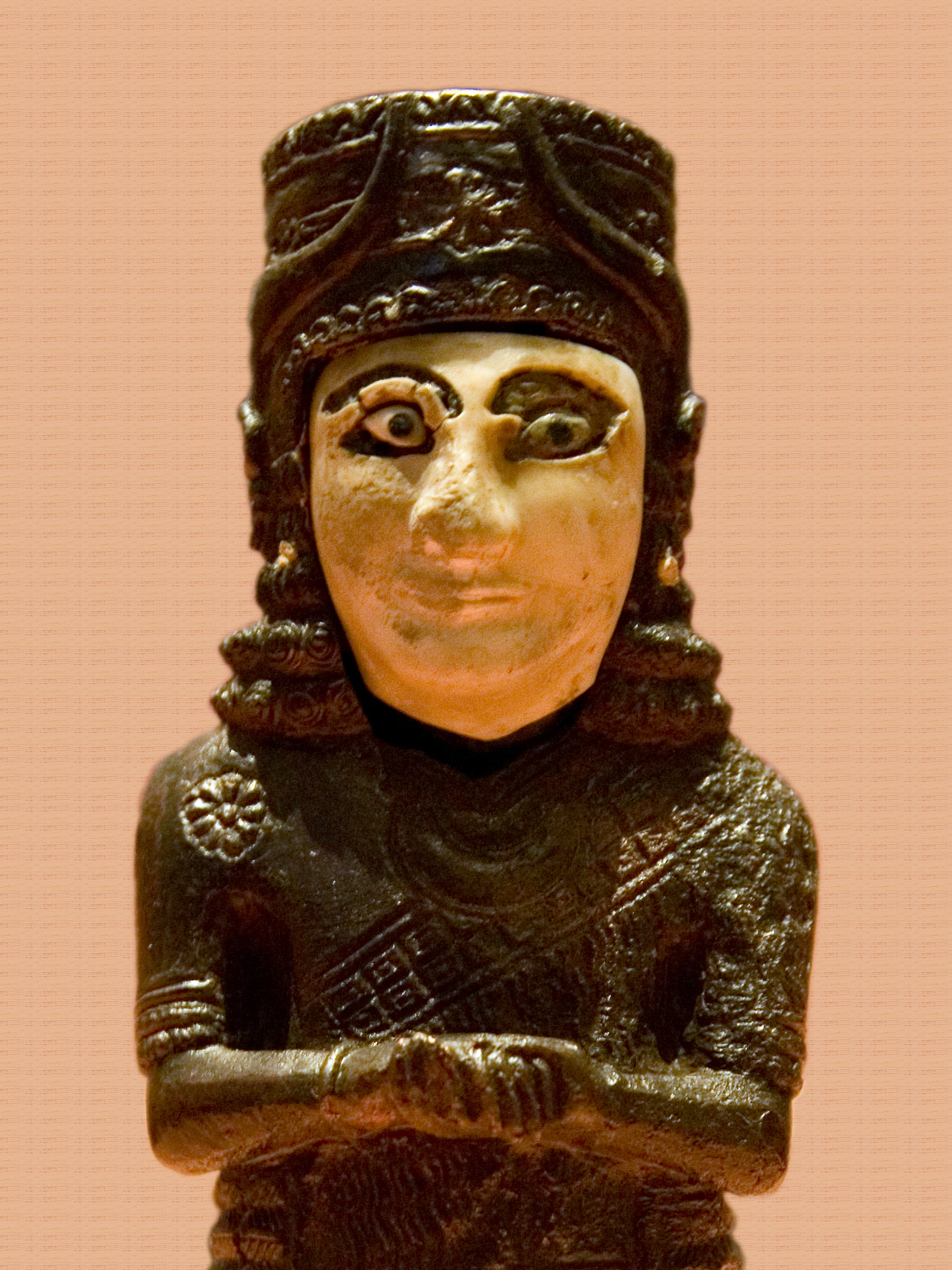
Urartian deity

According to historian M. Chahin:

Urartian history is part of Armenian history, in the same sense that the history of the ancient Britons is part of English history, and that of the Gauls is part of French history. Armenians can legitimately claim, through Urartu, an historical continuity of some 4000 years; their history is among those of the most ancient peoples in the world.

Scholars have found a number of probable Armenian deities, personal names, and toponyms mentioned within Urartian texts, suggesting that perhaps Urartu was at least partially composed of Armenian populations. These include the name of the first king of Urartu, Arame, and that of his second capital, Arzashkun.

According to the Armenian tradition, the Medes helped the Armenians establish the Orontid (Yervanduni) dynasty. This would indicate two scenarios—either Media subsequently conquered Urartu, bringing about its subsequent demise, or Urartu maintained its independence and power, going through a mere dynastic change, as a local Armenian dynasty or dynasties (the Haykazunis and/or the Orontids) overthrew the ruling family with the help of the Median army. Ancient sources support the latter version: Xenophon, for example, states that Armenia, ruled by an Orontid king, was not conquered until the reign of Median king Astyages (585–550 BC) – long after Median invasion of the late 7th century BC. Similarly, Strabo (1st century BC – 1st century AD) wrote that "[i]n ancient times Greater Armenia ruled the whole of Asia, after it broke up the empire of the Syrians, but later, in the time of Astyages, it was deprived of that great authority [...]."

Medieval Armenian chronicles corroborate the Greek and Hebrew sources. In particular, Movses Khorenatsi writes that the Armenian king Skayordi Haykazuni was a political foe of Assyria during the reign of Sennacherib (705–681 BCE), which would have been contemporaneous with the rule of Argishti II. Skayordi's son, Paruyr Haykazuni (also known as Paruyr Skayordi), helped Cyaxares and his allies conquer Assyria, for which Cyaxares recognized him as the king of Armenia. According to Khorenatsi, Media conquered Armenia only much later—under Astyages. It is possible that the last Urartian king, Rusa IV, had connections to the future incoming Armenian Orontids dynasty.

With the region reunified again under Armenia, the disparate peoples of the region mixed and became more homogenous and a unified sense of identity developed, and the Armenian language became the predominant language.

Armenologist Armen Petrosyan proposed that the powerful Etiuni confederation, located in what is now the territory of northeastern Turkey and Armenia, may have been the name the Urartians used to refer to Armenian-speaking tribes. According to both Urartian and Assyrian records, the Etiuni were hostile to Urartian rule. Etiuni toponyms and tribal names such as Uduri, Uelikuni, Išteluani, Abiliani, and Lusa, the river name Ildaruni, the goddess Aniqu, and personal names Diasuni, Murini, Qapurini, Nidini, and Ṣinalbi may have Armenian etymologies.

==== Presence of the Armenian language ====
The written language that the kingdom's political elite used is referred to as Urartian, which appears in cuneiform inscriptions in Armenia and eastern Turkey. It is unknown what language was spoken by the peoples of Urartu at the time of the existence of the kingdom of Van, but there is linguistic evidence of contact between the proto-Armenian language and the Urartian language at an early date (sometime between the 3rd—2nd millennium BC), occurring prior to the formation of Urartu as a kingdom.

The presence of a population who spoke proto-Armenian in Urartu prior to its demise is subject to speculation, but the existence of Urartian words in the Armenian language suggests early contact between the two languages and long periods of bilingualism. It is generally assumed that proto-Armenian speakers entered Anatolia around 1200 BC, during the Bronze Age Collapse, which was three to four centuries before the emergence of the Kingdom of Urartu. Regardless, the Urartian confederation united the disparate peoples of the highlands, which began a process of intermingling of the peoples and cultures (probably including Armenian tribes) and languages (probably including Proto-Armenian) within the highlands. This intermixing would ultimately culminate in the emergence of the Armenian language as the dominant language within the region. However, recent genetic research suggests that the Armenian ethnogenesis was completed by 1200 BCE, making the arrival of an Armenian-speaking population as late as the Bronze Age Collapse unlikely. Modern genetic studies show that Armenian diversity can be explained by several mixtures of Eurasian populations that occurred between ~3000 and ~2000 BCE, a period characterized by major population migrations after the domestication of the horse, appearance of the chariot, and the rise of advanced civilizations in West Asia. However, genetic signals of population mixture cease after ~1200 BCE when Bronze Age civilizations in the Eastern Mediterranean suddenly and violently collapsed.

An alternate theory suggests that Armenians were tribes indigenous to the northern shores of Lake Van or Urartu's northern periphery (possibly as the Hayasans, Etiuni, and/or Diauehi, all of whom are known only from references left by neighboring peoples such Hittites, Urartians and Assyrians). While the Urartian language was used by the royal elite, the population they ruled may have been multi-lingual, and some of these peoples would have spoken Armenian.

An addition to this theory, supported by the official historiography of Armenia and experts in Assyrian and Urartian studies such as Igor M. Diakonoff, Giorgi Melikishvili, Mikhail Nikolsky, and Ivan Mestchaninov, suggests that Urartian was solely the formal written language of the state, while its inhabitants, including the royal family, spoke Armenian.This theory primarily hinges on the fact that the Urartian language used in the cuneiform inscriptions were very repetitive and scant in vocabulary (having as little as 350–400 roots). Furthermore, over 250 years of usage, it shows no development, which is taken to indicate that the language had ceased to be spoken before the time of the inscriptions or was used only for official purposes.

A complimentary theory, suggested by Tamaz V. Gamkrelidze and Ivanov in 1984, places the Proto-Indo-European homeland (the location where Indo-European would have emerged from) in the Armenian Highlands (see: Armenian hypothesis), which would entail the presence of proto-Armenians in the area during the entire lifetime of the Urartian state. The Armenian hypothesis supports the theory that the Urartian language was not spoken, but simply written, and postulates that the Armenian language as an in situ development of a 3rd millennium BC Proto-Indo-European language.

=== Appearance of Armenia ===
The Orontid dynasty, also known by their native name Eruandid or Yervanduni, was a hereditary Armenian dynasty and the rulers of the successor state to the Iron Age kingdom of Urartu (Ararat). The Orontids established their supremacy over Armenia around the time of the Scythian and Median invasion in the 6th century BC.

Members of the Orontid dynasty ruled Armenia intermittently during the period spanning the 6th century BC to at least the 2nd century BC, first as client kings or satraps of the Median and Achaemenid empires who established an independent kingdom after the collapse of the Achaemenid empire, and later as kings of Sophene and Commagene who eventually succumbed to the Roman Empire. The Orontids are the first of the three royal dynasties that successively ruled the ancient Kingdom of Armenia (321 BC–428 AD).

Little is known about the origins of the Orontid dynasty. Some historians believe that the Orontid kings were of Armenian or Urartian origin. In addition, historians believe the dynasty may have had Iranian origin through a possible relation to the Achaemenids, either through marriage or blood.

The name Orontes is the Hellenized form of a masculine name of Iranian origin; Երուանդ Eruand in Old Armenian. The name is only attested in Greek (Gr.:Ὀρόντης). Its Avestan connection is Auruuant (brave, hero) and Middle Persian Arwand (Modern Persian اروند Arvand). Some have suggested a continuity with the Hittite name Arnuwanda. Various Greek transcriptions of the name in Classical sources are spelled as Orontes, Aruandes or Ardoates. The presence of this dynasty is attested from at least 400 BC, and it can be shown to have ruled originally from Armavir and subsequently Yervandashat. Armavir is called the "first capital of the Orontid dynasty" — a few Greek language inscriptions have been found, but the penetration of Hellenistic culture in Armavir seems to have been limited.

The precise date of the foundation of the Orontid dynasty is debated by scholars to this day but there is a consensus that it occurred after the destruction of Urartu by the Scythians and the Medes around 612 BC.

=== Religion ===
The earliest religious beliefs of Armenians are believed to have been a blend of Indo-European, Mesopotamian, and native Anatolian beliefs. Native gods and goddesses worshiped included Ar (Arev, Areg), Angegh, Astghik, Ayg, Vanatur, and others.

During Median and Persian domination, Iranian religious influences began to mix with native Armenian beliefs, leading to the worship of new, syncretic deities such as Mihr, Aramazd, Vahagn, and Anahit.

Christianity spread into the country as early as AD 40. Tiridates III of Armenia (238–314) made Christianity the state religion in 301, partly, in defiance of the Sasanian Empire, it seems, becoming the first officially Christian state, ten years before the Roman Empire granted Christianity an official toleration under Galerius. Prior to this, during the latter part of the Parthian era, Armenia was a predominantly Zoroastrian country.
