= Urumeans =

Bronze and Iron Age tribe in present-day eastern Turkey

The Urumu (also called the Urumeans) were a tribe attested in cuneiform sources in the Bronze Age. They are often considered to be one of the ancestors of the Armenians being one of the tribes which were part of the Hayasa-Azzi confederation.

== History ==
The Assyrian first mentioned the Urumu in the early 12th century BC. The Urumu, with their allies the Mushki and Kaska (Apishlu), conquered the lands of Alzi and Purukuzzi (near the source of the Tigris, west of Lake Van), inciting the locals not to pay taxes.

Ignace Jay Gelb suggested the Urumeans might have been mentioned much earlier, as the "Urumum" of the Cuthean Legend of Naram-Sin, which dates to the 3rd millennium BC. Igor Diakonoff, however, placed Urumum in Elam.

Vyacheslav Ivanov connected them to the "Urameans" in a separate Assyrian text also dated to around 2000 BC.

== Location ==
The Urumu are believed to have originally come from the north (Hayasa-Azzi) or northwest (Hatti). However, the Urumu are often associated with the lands of Arme and Urume (Inner Urumu), located to the west of Lake Van in the territory of Shupria (modern Sason). These lands are known from 8th century BC Urartian and Assyrian records. In Urartian texts it is mentioned as Urme.

== Ethno-linguistic makeup ==
Little is known about the language of the Urumu. However, their name, and the presence of Armenian toponyms in the region, led Igor Diakonoff and other scholars to suggest the Urumu (along with their allies the Mushki) may have been speakers of Proto-Armenian, the direct ancestor of the modern Armenian language.

The exonyms "Armenia" and "Armenians" may originate in the Urartian "Armini," or "inhabitant of Arme."

Petrosyan suggested the name "Urumu" was probably pronounced "Oromu" and was perhaps a dialectal form of "Aram" and/or "Arme," which he etymologized as deriving from Proto-Indo-European "*rē-mo-" (black).

According to Armenian tradition, the legendary Armenian patriarch Aram had a cousin and general named Mishak (Misak, Moshok). Scholars have proposed a connection between the names Aram and Urumu and Mishak and Mushki.

== See also ==
- Urartu
- Assyria
- Proto-Armenian
- Mushki
- Kaskians
- Nairi
- Shupria
- Origins of the Armenians
