= Shupria =

Ancient kingdom in the southern Armenian highlands

Shubria or Shupria was a kingdom in the southern Armenian highlands, known from Assyrian sources in the first half of the 1st millennium BC. It was located north of the upper Tigris River and to the southwest of Lake Van, extending eastwards to the frontiers of Urartu. It appears in the 1st millennium BC as an independent kingdom, succeeding the people earlier called Shubaru in Assyrian sources in the later centuries of the 2nd millennium BC. It was located between the powerful states of Assyria and Urartu and came into conflict with both. It was conquered by Assyria in 673–672 BC but likely regained its independence towards the end of the 7th century BC with the collapse of Assyrian power.

Some scholars have concluded from the Hurrian etymology of some Shubrian names that Shubria was mainly populated by Hurrians. Some have suggested that it was the last remnant of Hurrian civilization, or that it constituted the original homeland of the Hurrians. However, other Shubrian names have been identified as Aramean by origin. Bradley J. Parker writes that the existing evidence indicates that Shubria had a heterogeneous population including Hurrians, Arameans, and likely also Urartians, Assyrians and others. According to some scholars, Shubria was inhabited, at least in part, by speakers of the Proto-Armenian language and played an important role in the formation of the later Armenian state and ethnic group.

== Geography and toponyms ==
The name Shubria is related to the older term Subartu(m) (Shubartu(m), Subir, Subar(u)), which had varying geographical and ethnic or cultural associations that transformed over time. This term dates back to Sumerian times, when it appears to have been used to describe an area corresponding to Upper Mesopotamia and the southern Armenian highlands. In Babylonian texts, Subartu and Subarians refers to Assyria and the Assyrians. After the destruction of the Hurrian kingdom of Mitanni by the Hittites in the third quarter of the 14th century BC, the term Shubaru was used in Assyrian sources to refer to the remnants of the Mitanni in the upper Tigris valley. In Igor Diakonoff's view, the ending -ia in Shubria cannot be native Akkadian and probably indicates that the term was borrowed or reborrowed from Urartian.

Shubria was located south of modern-day Muş, Turkey, north of the upper Tigris River and to the southwest of Lake Van, extending eastwards to the frontiers of Urartu. It was located near the northern frontier of the Assyrian Empire, across the Tigris from Tushhan and east of the land of Dirru. Geographically, its core district corresponds to the later Armenian region of Sasun. The capital of Shubria was called Ubbumu (also spelled Uppumu). This city may have been located at modern-day Lice, Turkey, with its name likely preserved in the name of the nearby hamlet of Fum. Its other main city was Kullimeri, which may have been located at the mound known as Gre Migro in the Batman River valley. The Urartians referred to Shubria as Qulmeri, after Kullimeri. Kullimeri may also be the origin of the biblical klmd (from a putative original *klmr), which is mentioned in Ezekiel 27:23 as one of the trading partners of Tyre and is normally read as Kilmad or Chilmad. In the view of some scholars, Qulmeri is the most likely candidate for the native name of Shubria.

The lands of Arme and Urmiu (Note: According to Diakonoff, the common reading Urme is incorrect.) (Urumu in Assyrian sources, land of the Urumeans) are mentioned in different Urartian inscriptions from the time of Sarduri II. Giorgi Melikishvili identifies Urmiu with Shubria—a name which does not appear in Urartian inscriptions—and places Arme further west. Igor Diakonoff once considered it likely that Arme and Urmiu were the same land and referred to Shubria as Urme- or Arme-Shubria. (Note: Arme and Shubria were also identified with each other by Boris Piotrovsky and Suren Yeremian. Yeremian theorized that the Urumeans were Proto-Armenian speakers from Hayasa or nearby who migrated south in the 12th century BC, founding the country of Urumu/Urme/Arme and later merging with Hurrian Shubria to form the core of the future Armenian state and people.) However, in a later version of his work, Diakonoff writes that "there is good reason to believe that [Urmiu] lay to the east of Šubria," while Urartian Arme may have simply meant "Aramaic-speaking country," indicating the area between Amid (modern Diyarbakır) and the upper Tigris where the Aramaic and Proto-Armenian linguistic zones met.

== History ==
After the destruction of the Hurrian kingdom of Mitanni by the Hittites in the third quarter of the 14th century BC, the term Shubaru was used to refer to the remnants of the Mitanni in the upper Tigris valley. The Middle Assyrian kings Adad-nirari I, Shalmaneser I, and Tukulti-Ninurta I claimed to have defeated the Shubaru/Subarians. After the Hurrian king Shattuara of Mitanni-Khanigalbat was defeated by Adad-nirari I in the early 13th century BC, he appears to have become ruler of a reduced vassal state, Subartu. The Subarian peoples continued to revolt against Assyrian rule; for example, the Assyrian king Tiglath-Pileser I (r. 1114–1076 BC) fought against the "unsubmissive Shubaru" early in his reign.

In the 1st millennium BC, Shubria, the continuation of the earlier Subartu, appears as an independent kingdom occupying a difficult geopolitical position: it was wedged between two great powers of Assyria and Urartu. The king of Shubria, Anhitti, is recorded as presenting tribute to King Ashurnasirpal II of Assyria (r. 883–859 BC); here, the older name Shubaru is used. In 854 BC, Ashurnasirpal's successor Shalmaneser III captured Shubrian cities and forced Anhitti to submit and pay tribute. Assyrian letters indicate that Shubria was under Urartian rule during the reign of Rusa I (r. 735–713 BC). It likely acquired its independence after the Urartians under Rusa were defeated by Assyria under Sargon II in 714 BC.

From the late 8th century BC, Shubria successfully preserved its independence, disregarding the interests of Urartu and Assyria. The Shubrian king frequently received refugees and fugitives from Urartu and Assyria and refused to extradite them. This included commoners escaping military or labor obligations. During the reign of Esarhaddon of Assyria, high-ranking military and civil officials, as well as criminals, also found refuge in Shubria. This practice of providing sanctuary to refugees and fugitives may have been rooted in religious tradition. In 673–672 BC, Esarhaddon invaded and conquered Shubria. This conquest is recorded in a letter from Esarhaddon to the god Ashur, which is partially preserved on two tablets. According to the letter, the Shubrian ruler Ik-Teshub rejected Esarhaddon's demand to extradite Assyrian fugitives (possibly conspirators involved in the assassination of Esarhaddon's father Sennacherib), after which the Assyrians besieged Uppumu. The Shubrian king tried to surrender, but Esarhaddon ignored his pleas and conquered the Shubrian cities, taking many captives. After this, Shubria was ruled as two Assyrian provinces: Kullimeri and Uppumu. Esarhaddon rebuilt the Shubrian cities, giving them Assyrian names, and populated them with people resettled from elsewhere. In 657 BC, the Urartians made an unsuccessful attempt to conquer Shubria. The Urartian general or governor Andaria was killed in a failed attack on the city of Kullimeri. Assyrian control may have remained weak in Shubria, as the inhabitants of Kullimeri appear to have fought off this attack on their own, although they did send the head of the Urartian commander to the Assyrian king as a sign of their loyalty.

According to Diakonoff, it is "quite probable" that Shubria was settled by speakers of Proto-Armenian—who he believes were known as the (eastern) Mushki and possibly also the Urumeans—from the time of Esarhaddon's conquest and deportations. Shubria likely regained its independence towards the end of the 7th century BC, like other fringe territories of the Assyrian Empire. Based on the Armenian legend about the first Armenian king Paroyr Skayordi, some scholars have hypothesized that an Armenian-populated kingdom emerged in or near Shubria, possibly ruled by a dynasty of Scythian origin, which allied with the Medes to defeat the Assyrian Empire c. 612 BC. Suren Yeremian argues that the Armenian ruler of Shubria was recognized as king by the Median king Cyaxares after participating in the victory over the Assyrians. Boris Piotrovsky, who identified Arme and Shubria with each other, places this polity ruled by "Paroyr" "in the immediate vicinity of Arme, if it did not constitute it [Arme]" and also suggests that its ruler received Median recognition after participating in the victory over Assyria. Diakonoff writes that Shubria "undoubtedly played a great role in the emergence of the later Armenian state and nation," although he considers the kingdom of Melid to be a better candidate for the nucleus of the Armenian people and kingdom.

== Population ==
Some scholars have concluded from the Hurrian etymology of some Shubrian names that Shubria was mainly populated by Hurrians. Some have suggested that it was the last remnant of Hurrian civilization, or even constituted the original homeland of the Hurrians. However, other Shubrian names have been identified as Aramean by origin. Bradley J. Parker writes that the existing evidence indicates that Shubria had a heterogeneous population including Hurrians, Arameans, and likely also Urartians, Assyrians and others. Karen Radner writes that Shubria "can certainly be described as [a] (linguistically and culturally) Hurrian" state. According to Radner, a letter from the king of Shubria to an Assyrian magnate from the time of Sargon II was composed in the Hurrian language.

According to some scholars, Shubria was inhabited by speakers of the Proto-Armenian language and formed the nucleus of Armenian statehood. Diakonoff theorized that the Proto-Armenians migrated eastwards from Anatolia into the western part of the Armenian highlands in the second quarter of the 12th century BC. He identifies the Proto-Armenians with the Mushki and considers an identification with the Urumeans possible. He notes that while Shubria had a Hurrian ruling dynasty and apparently also a Hurrian population, its people were deported after Esarhaddon's conquest, and it is likely that the Proto-Armenians settled Shubria from that time.

== Religion ==
The Hurrian god Teshub was the main god of Shubria, as evidenced by the names of its kings. The Tigris Grotto served as a natural religious site for Shubria. It may have been the most important shrine in the country. The Shubrians performed the religious rites common to the Hurrians: augury and scapegoat rituals. Shubrian scholars engaged in augury were present at the Assyrian royal court. The Shubrian king Ik-Teshub performed a scapegoat ritual in his attempt to surrender during Esarhaddon's invasion. Tamas Deszö argues that Shubria's policy of accepting refugees derived from religious tradition, suggesting that the Shubrians had a refuge sanctuary at Uppumu, as well as a temple to Teshub there. Karen Radner speculates that it was the Tigris Grotto that served as a refuge sanctuary. Since the Birkleyn cave system, known as the "Tigris source," was known to and considered sacred by the Assyrians, Radner suggests that it was likely known to the Shubrians as well.

== See also ==
- Armani (kingdom)
- Bronze Age collapse
- Indo-European languages
