= Name of Armenia =

Various names used for Armenia

The name Armenia entered English via Latin, from Ancient Greek Ἀρμενία.

The Armenian endonym for the Armenian people and country is hay (pl. hayer) and Hayastan, respectively. The exact etymologies of the names of Armenia are unknown, and there are various speculative attempts to connect them to older toponyms or ethnonyms.

== Armenia/Armenians ==
Armenia and Armenians are the most common names used internationally to refer to the country Armenia and the Armenian people. Armenians themselves do not use it while speaking Armenian, making it an exonym.

=== Etymology ===
Multiple theories and speculations exist about the origin of the name Armenia, but no consensus has been reached by historians and linguists. Armenologist Nicholas Adontz has rejected some of the speculations in his 1946 book.

The earliest unambiguous and universally accepted attestation of the name dates to the 6th century BC, from the trilingual Behistun Inscription, where the names Armina (in Old Persian), Harminuya (in Elamite), and Urashtu (in Babylonian) and their equivalent demonyms are used in reference to Armenia and people from Armenia. In Greek, Αρμένιοι (Armenioi, an ethnonym) is attested from about the same time, perhaps the earliest reference being a fragment attributed to Hecataeus of Miletus (c. 476 BC).

==== From Indo-European *ar- ====
Some authors have connected Armenia to the Indo-European root *ar- meaning "to assemble".

==== From Armani and/or Armânum ====
Early 20th century Armenologists have suggested that Old Persian 𐎠𐎼𐎷𐎡𐎴 a-r-mi-i-n(a) and the Greek Armenoi are continuations of an Assyrian toponym Armânum or Armanî. There are certain Bronze Age records identified with the toponym in both Mesopotamian and Egyptian sources. The earliest is from an inscription which mentions Armânum together with Ibla as territories conquered by Naram-Sin of Akkad in c. 2250 BC identified with an Akkadian colony in the Diarbekr region. Many historians, such as Wayne Horowitz, identify Armanî which was conquered by Naram-Sin of Akkad, with the Syrian city of Aleppo.

Armenia has also been claimed as a variant of Urmani (or Urmenu), attested epigraphically in an inscription of Menuas of Urartu.

It is possible that the name Armenia originates in Armini, Urartian for "inhabitant of Arme" or "Armean country." The Arme tribe of Urartian texts may have been the Urumu, who in the 12th century BC attempted to invade Assyria from the north with their allies the Mushki and the Kaskians. The Urumu apparently settled in the vicinity of Sason, lending their name to the regions of Arme and the nearby lands of Urme and Inner Urumu.

==== From Har-Minni ====
Alternatively, Armenia is interpreted by some as ^{ḪAR}Minni, that is, "the mountainous region of the Minni". Minni (מנּי) is also a Biblical name of the region, appearing in the Bible (Jeremiah 51:27) alongside Ararat and Ashkenaz, probably the same as the Minnai of Assyrian inscriptions, corresponding to the Mannai. The Elamite name for Armenia was inscribed as har-mi-nu-ya.

==== From Erimena ====
The name Erimena appears in Urartian inscriptions as the father of king Rusa III, which can be interpreted to mean "Rusa, son of the Armenian".

==== Armen tribe hypothesis ====
There have been further speculations as to the existence of a Bronze Age tribe of the Armens (Armans, Armani; Armenian: Արմեններ Armenner, Առամեններ Aṙamenner), either identical to or forming a subset of the Hayasa-Azzi. In this case, Armenia would be an ethnonym rather than a toponym. Attestations of such a tribe have never been found.

==== From Aram and/or Arame ====
Armenian tradition has an eponymous ancestor, Aram, a lineal descendant of Hayk (Հայկ), son of Harma and father of Ara the Beautiful (according to classical Armenian historian Moses of Chorene). A much older Aram, the son of Shem, is also mentioned from the Book of Genesis, Historian Flavius Josephus, and the Dead Sea Scrolls, as being the sovereign over "all the land of Mesopotamia between the Tigris and the Euphrates to the north of the Chaldees to the border of the mountains of Asshur and the land of 'Arara." Aram is sometimes equated with Arame of Urartu, the earliest known king of Urartu. The endonym Hayk’ (from Classical Armenian) in the same tradition is traced to Hayk himself.

The names Armen and Arman, feminine Arminé, are common given names by Armenians. Armin is also a Persian given name.

== Hayastan/Hayk/Hayer ==
Armenian people use names derived from the stem hay- as their endonym. Hay (singular) and Hayer (plural) is used to refer to the Armenian people. Hayastan (Hay + -a- + -stan) is used to refer to their country, while Hayk was used historically and is still used today romantically.

=== Etymology ===
==== From Hatti ====
According to Diakonoff, the ethnonym may derive from the unattested Proto-Armenian name *hatiyos or *hatyos → *hayo → hay, related to Urartian 𒆳𒄩𒀀𒋼 (^{KUR}ḫa-a-te, "the land of Hittites"), from Hittite 𒄩𒋾 (ḫa-ti /Ḫatti/). In the Armenian language, the Proto-Indo-European intervocalic *-t- drops and yields /y/. Compare *ph₂tḗr → *hatir → *hayir → hayr ("father"). Other examples include *h₂eh₁ter- → *ātr- → *ayr → ayrem ("burn"), *bʰréh₂tēr → ełbayr ("brother").

The name Ḫāte was given by Urartians to all lands west of Euphrates, including the territory around Malatya (a region assumed to be occupied by speakers of Proto-Armenians). Diakonoff theorized that when the Urartians were assimilated among the Proto-Armenians, they took over their Indo-European language and called themselves by the same name of the "Hittites".

==== From Hayasa ====
Others suggest that the etymology of the hay- stem derives from the name of a realm in proximity to the Armenian Highlands called Ḫayaša.

The presumption is that the name Hayk' would derive from Hayasa, but Diakonoff considers this "not provable and in its very essence not probable." According to Kapantsjan, the suffix -sa in Hayasa as the ancient Luwian toponymical suffix -ssas, widely in use throughout all of Anatolia, but this suffix is not present in the Armenian language. It is also argued that the initial ḫ in Ḫayaša yielding /h/ in Armenian is improbable. However, Vartan Matiossian and others argue that since Hayasa is a Hittite (or Hittite-ized) exonym applied to a foreign land, the -asa suffix can still mean "land of." Additionally, a pronunciation like "Ḫayasa" (i.e. "Khayasa") can be reconciled with Hay as the Hittite h and kh phonemes are interchangeable, a feature present in certain Armenian dialects as well.

==== From Hayk ====
According to Armenian historiographic tradition, the endonym Hayk’ (Հայք) comes from the legendary eponymous ancestor of the Armenian nation, Hayk (Հայկ).

==== From *h₂éyos ====
Hay may derive from the Proto Indo-European word *h₂éyos (or possibly *áyos), meaning "metal." According to this theory, Hayasa meant "land of metal," referring to the early metallurgy techniques developed in the region.

According to Hittitologist J.G. Macqueen, the region of Hayasa-Azzi was rich in metallic ores. The presence of this resource piqued the interest of the Hittites and led to frequent clashes between Hayasa-Azzi and Hatti, who needed Hayasa's metals to produce weapons.

The Armenian Highlands and Pontus-region were famous for bronze and iron smelting techniques into the Classical-era. The Ancient Greeks and Romans made mention of a people to the immediate north of Armenia called Chalybes (Χᾰ́λῠψ). Some scholars have theorized this name means "steel."

==== From *poti ====
19th century linguists Friedrich Spiegel and Heinrich Kiepert proposed that hay might derive from *poti, Proto-Indo-European for "lord, master, husband." According to this theory, the name, with plural suffix, developed from *potiio→*hetiyo→*hatiyo→hay. The p→h and t→y consanant shifts are common in Armenian. For example, the Proto-Indo-European word *pH₂tér- (father) became hayr in Armenian. Additionally, a vowel shift from o→ a is explicable as it is present in other Indo-European languages, such as Sanskrit patih (master, husband) and Lithuanian patis (husband), both descended from Proto-Indo-European *poti. According to Armen Petrosyan, hay has been used to mean "husband, chief of family" in several Armenian dialects. Petrosyan suggests that Etiuni, the name of a powerful tribal confederation to the immediate north of Urartu, may reflect a Urartian-language form of *hetiyo or *hatiyo.

== Somkheti/Somekhi ==
The Georgian term Somkheti for Armenia and Somekhi for Armenians, and forms derived from it, are used by Georgians and some peoples of the Caucasus.

=== Etymology ===
According to Diakonoff, the name is derived by metathesis from the name of the country called Suḫmu in Akkadian and Zuhma in Hittite, located in the upper Euphrates valley, close to South-Caucasian tribes, and is presumed to have been inhabited by Proto-Armenians.

According to Professor James R. Russell of Harvard University, Somekhi refers to the Mushki, who Diakonoff suggested were Armenian-speakers.

== Ararat/Urartu ==
Used historically as a synonym for Armenia, in the forms of Urartu in the Assyrian dialect of Akkadian and Urashtu in the Babylonian dialect, as well as Ararat in Biblical Hebrew. The name Ararat was changed to Armenia in the Bible as early as the 1st century AD in historiographical works and very early Latin translations. This name was attested as Uruatri as early as the 13th century BC by Assyrian king Shalmaneser I, and it was used interchangeably with Armenia until the last known attestation from the 5th century BC by Xerxes in his XV Inscriptions. Sometime during the early periods of Classical Antiquity, the use of Urartu declined and was fully replaced with Armenia. The name continued to be used in the form of Ayrarat for the central province of Ancient Armenia (also attested as Aurarat by Strabo), as a scarcely used alternative name for the First Republic of Armenia (Araratian Republic), and for a short-lived and self-proclaimed Kurdish state known as the Republic of Ararat. Today, Ararat is used as one of the names given to the twin-peaked mountain in the Armenian Highlands, in modern-day Turkey, and for a province by the same name in the Republic of Armenia. It's also a common given name used by Armenians.

== Modern names ==
Language	Armenians	Armenia
Armenian	հայեր (hayer)	Հայաստան (Hayastan), Հայք (Hayk’)
Arabic	أرمن (Arman)	أرمينيا (Armīniyā)
Aramaic	ܐܪܡܐܢܥ (Armānī)	ܐܪܡܝܢܝܐ (Armīniyā)
Avar	Цӏамухъ (C̣amuq̄)	ЦIамгIалал (C̣amghalal)
Azerbaijani	Ermənilər	Ermənistan
Chechen	Эрмалой (Ermaloy)	Эрмалойчоь (Ermaloyçö)
Mandarin Chinese	亞美尼亞人 (yàměiníyàrén)	亞美尼亞 (yàměiníyà)
French	Arméniens	Arménie
Georgian	სომხები (Somkhebi)	სომხეთი (Somkhet'i)
Greek	Αρμένιοι (Arménioi)	Αρμενία (Armenía)
Hebrew	אַרְמֶנִים (Armenim)	אַרְמֶנִיָה (Armeniya)
Kurdish	Ermeni	Ermenistan
Ossetian	сомехаг (Somekhag)	Сомех (Somekh)
Persian	ارمنی (Armani)	ارمنستان (Armanestān)
Russian	армяне (armyane)	Армения (Armeniya)
Turkish	Ermeniler	Ermenistan
