= Etiuni =

Iron Age confederation in Armenia

Etiuni (other names Etiuḫi, Etiu, Etio) was the name of an early Iron Age tribal confederation in northern parts of Araxes River, roughly corresponding to the subsequent Ayrarat Province of the Kingdom of Armenia. Etiuni was frequently mentioned in the records of Urartian kings, who led numerous campaigns into Etiuni territory. It is very likely it was the "Etuna" or "Etina" which contributed to the fall of Urartu, according to Assyrian texts. Some scholars believe it had an Armenian-speaking population.

== Names and etymology ==
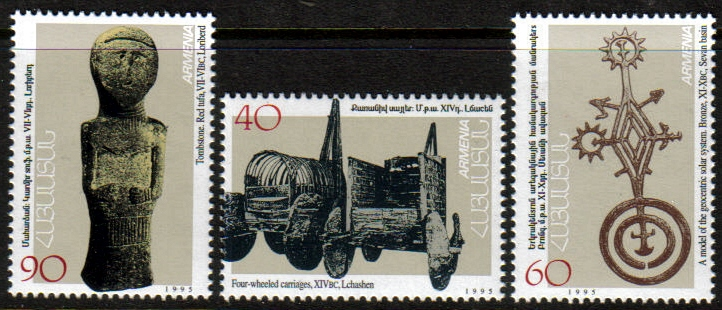
Stamps issued by Armenia, portraying ancient artifacts left by Lchashen-Metsamor culture (Etiuni), found near Lake Sevan

Igor Diakonov wrote that Etiuni was a Urartian name meaning "land/people of Etio", whereas Mirjo Salvini preferred to read it as "Etiu". Ethnographer Armen Petrosyan suggested that this name could be a Urartian cuneiform rendering of Hatio (sometimes transliterated as Hattiyo or Hatiyo), which Diakonov had offered as a reconstructed initial form of the modern Armenian endonym, Hay (հայ).

The cuneiform writing system the Urartians used lacked a symbol to designate an "h" sound, so the Urartians used either a symbol usually meant to convey a laryngeal h (ḫ, χ), or opted to not use any symbol to try to convey this sound. Petrosyan, citing Diakonoff and Gevorg Jahukyan, said that Urartian "e" may correspond with Armenian "a" when used at the start of words.

Petrosyan, citing 19th-century linguists Friedrich Spiegel and Heinrich Kiepert, proposed that "Hatio" might ultimately derive from Proto-Indo-European *poti, meaning "lord, master, husband." According to this theory, the name, with plural suffix, developed from *potiio→*hetiyo→*hatiyo→hay.

The Urartians sometimes used the variation, Etiuḫi, which seems to have referred to the people of Etiuni specifically.

== Location and regions ==
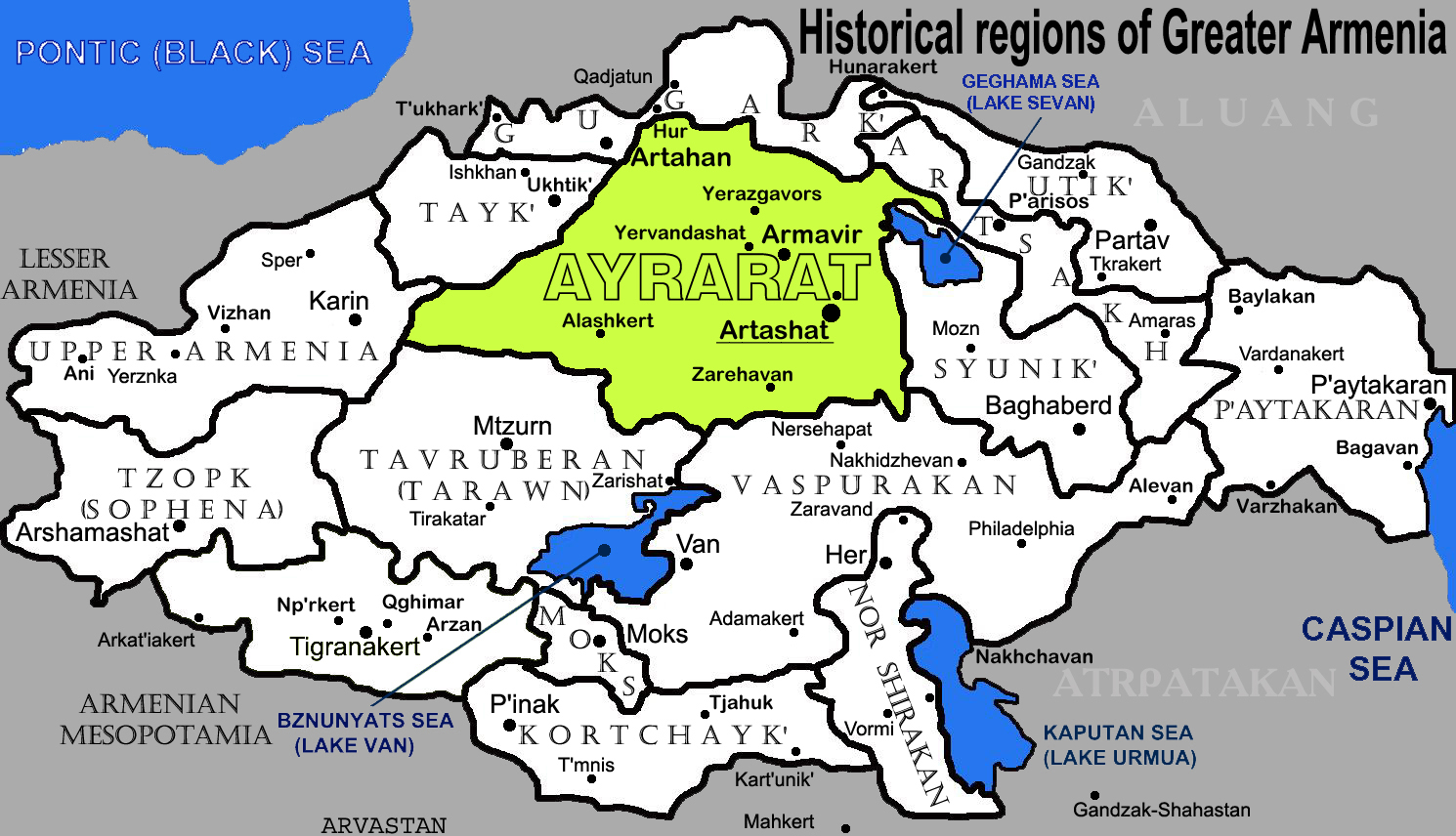
Etiuni seems to have largely overlapped geographically with the later Ayrarat province of the Kingdom of Armenia, although Etiuni encompassed more of Lake Sevan's shoreline

Etiuni was composed of a number of small kingdoms and tribes, included Iga (also known as Igani, Iya, and Aia), on the south shore of Lake Cildir, Abiliani and Apuni, probably corresponding to the Armenian Abełean and Havnunik, in Kars region, and the Luša, Katarza, Uiṭeruḫi (Witeruḫi), and Gulutaḫi, of the Ararat plain. Another region of Etiuni was Liquini, located near Armavir. Petrosyan suggested that Erkuaḫi, another Etiunian region located on the north side of Mount Ararat, could be a native Armenian name for the two peaks of the mountain (compare to Armenian erku երկու 'two').

The city of Aza, mentioned by Rusa as an important temple-city along the Araxes River, has been connected to the wealthy religious center, Azara, which was later placed by Strabo near Artashat.

The Etiunian lands of Uelikuni (Welikuni) and Tiluḫu were located on the western shore of Lake Sevan and Kekuni was on the lake's northern shore. The archaeological site of Lchashen, probably corresponding to the city of Ishtikuni, was located in one of these kingdoms.

The Urartians mentioned "the four kings of Uduri-Etiuni." This may have referred to a separate, but perhaps culturally and linguistically connected, confederation from Etiuni, comprising the lands Lueḫi, Kemani, Urteḫini, and Arquqini, stretching along the southern shore of Lake Sevan. The word "Uduri" probably means "water" (referring to its location along Lake Sevan).

Etiuni seems to have been bordered by Diaeuḫi to the west, Urartu and possibly the separate lands of Biani to the south and Kulḫi to the north or northwest.

== Relation with Urartu ==
During the co-regency of Ishpuini and his son, Menua, Urartu began expanding northward into Etiunian territories, battling the Katarza and Luša tribes, bragging about conquering Liquini and "the mighty land of" Erkuaḫi, and putting Etiuni under tribute as a result.

Menua's son, Argišti, ventured further into Etiunian territory than his predecessors, building the fortress of Erebuni (located in Yerevan) on newly conquered land, and bringing to it 6600 warriors from Hatti and Shupria. Argišti conquered Apuni, Luša (castrating its king as a result), and Iga, taking many of the inhabitants of these regions as captives.

However, the Etiunians seem to have revolted and invaded Urartu during Argišti's reign, stealing the aštiuzi (perhaps an idol of a god; compare this word to Armenian աստված (astuats), meaning 'god') of the Urartian religious center, Musasir.

Sarduri II, Argišti's son, also launched numerous military campaigns in Etiuni in the 740s BCE, battling with local rulers and the king of Etiuni, Diuṣini (or Diaṣuni). However, whatever became of this confrontation with Diuṣini is unknown, as the text breaks off.

According to the Assyrians, "the Etinaeans" revolted three times during the reign of Rusa I, Sarduri II's son. These revolts apparently resulted in Urartian military losses and Urartu being "plundered."

A later Assyrian text mention that Urartu had been "destroyed" by the "people of Etuna."

== Ethno-linguistic makeup ==
Igor Diakonov considered it possible that the Etiuni were a Hurro-Urartian people, although he did not explain his reasoning for this classification.

More recently, Armen Petrosyan, linguist Hrach Martirosyan, and other scholars have suggested Armenian etymologies for a number of Etiunian personal, place, tribal, and religious names. Armenian names and words have been identified in Urartu as well, suggesting the possibility that Armenian speaking tribes could have constituted part of the populations of both lands.

In addition to Armenian speaking populations, there were also likely Scythian and/or Cimmerian tribes present in Etiuni or its vicinity. The names of the Etiunian land Ishkugul (probably near Gyumri) and its prince, Saga-tur or Sagaputara (perhaps the Skayordi of Moses of Khorene) are suggestive of the presence of Scythians and/or Cimmerians.

== Rulers ==
The Urartians only named one king of Etiuni, Diuṣini of Iga (or Iya). Petrosyan etymologized Diuṣini as being an otherwise unattested Armenian name meaning "born of god" (տիւ + ծնուն), comparing it to Greek Diogenes (Διογένης), Thracian Diazenus, Celtic Divogenos, and Sanskrit Devaja (देवजा).

Other kings of regions of Etiuni were likely rulers of smaller kingdoms or local chieftains. These included: Nidini of Uelikuḫi, Murinu of Uelikuḫi, Murini of Abiliani, Ṣinalbi of Lueḫi, Rašu of Ruišia, and Kapurini of Iga (Iya).

== In historiography ==
Petrosyan theorized that memories of Etiuni may have been passed down by the medieval Armenian historian Movses Khorenatsi.

In the History of Armenia, Khoren says the historically unattested Armenian king, Zarmayr, led an army of "Ethiopians" to aid Troy during the Trojan War. Petrosyan speculated that Khoren or his contemporaries may have confused "Etio" for "Ethiopia" (a name they would have been more familiar with through Biblical studies).

== Archaeology ==
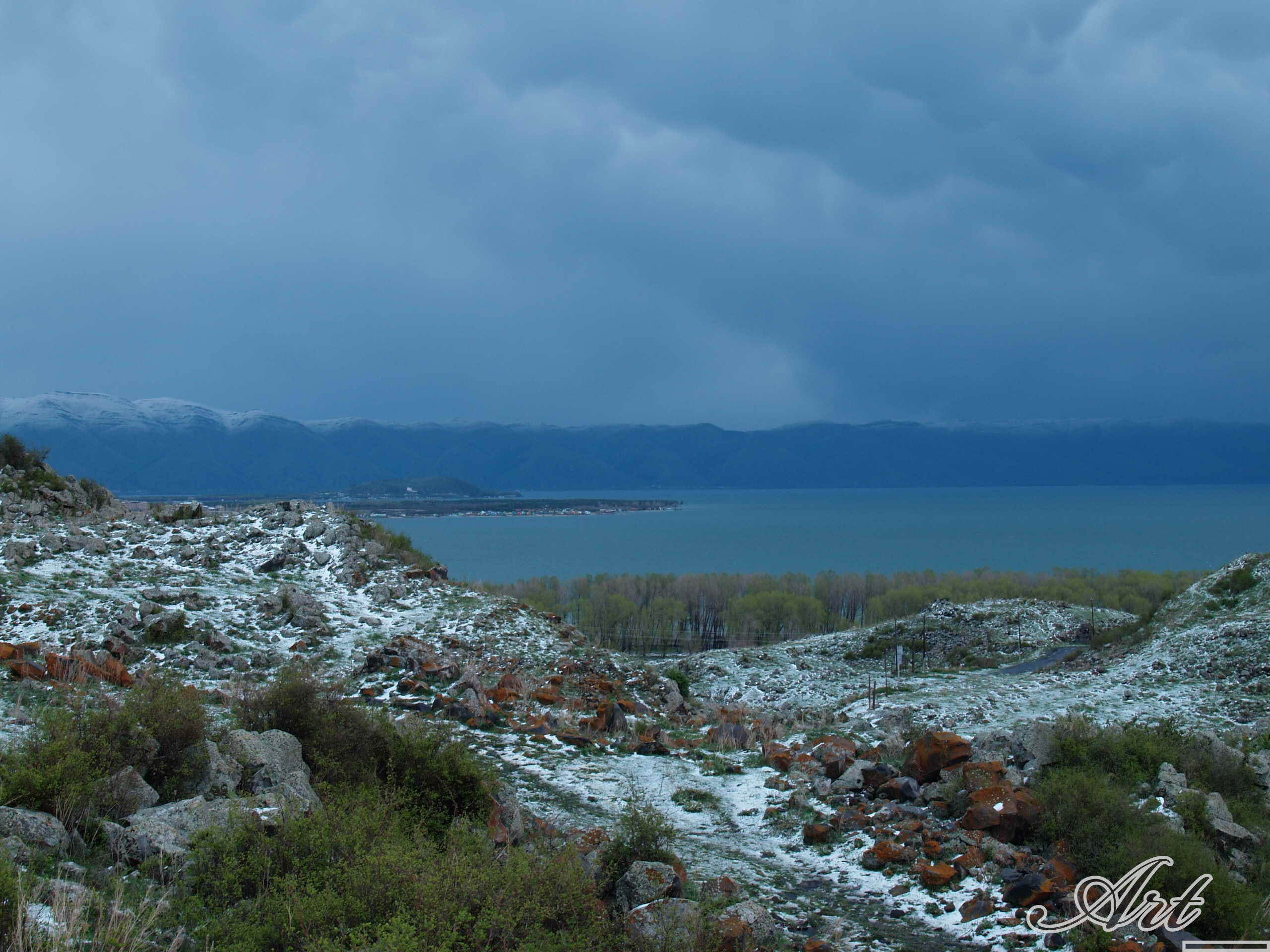
Ishtikuni was a city in Etiuni, along Lake Sevan. It is located in modern Lchashen, Armenia

Archaeologists connect Etiuni with the Lchashen-Metsamor culture. Lchashen-Metsamor culture ultimately descends from the Trialeti-Vanadzor culture.

Ishtikuni, near modern Lchashen, is a notable Etiunian archaeological site.

The Metsamor site, near modern Taronik, was an important metal-working center during the Iron Age.

== See also ==
- Origins of the Armenians
- Proto-Armenian language
- Hayasa-Azzi
