= Van-Urmia culture =

Bronze Age culture in Iran and the Near East

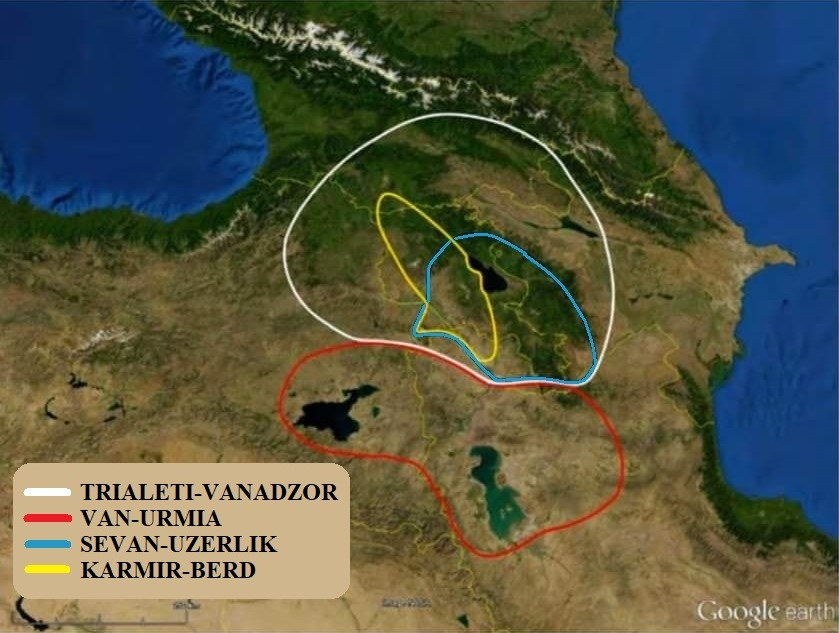
- Middle Bronze Age cultures in northern regions of West Asia
- Alternative names: Karmirvank culture, Kyzilvank culture
- Geographical range: Urmia basin, South Caucasus
- Period: Bronze Age
- Dates: circa 2200 B.C.E. — circa 1300 B.C.E.
- Major sites: Haftavān Tepe
- Preceded by: Kura-Araxes culture
- Followed by: Grooved ware, Grey ware

The Van-Urmia culture was a Bronze Age culture responsible for painted ceramics (also called Urmia Ware) that spread around Lake Urmia (north-west Iran) and Lake Van (eastern Anatolia), extending into the parts of the South Caucasus. In post-Soviet sources, it is known as Karmirvank or Kizylvank culture, based on the name of a site in Nakhichevan. The term “Urmia style” or “Urmia Ware” was first applied by archaeologist Michael R. Edwards to pottery found at the site of Haftavān Tepe (in the Urmia basin) at the VI B level of excavation. Later discovery of similar pottery in the Van region prompted the use of the term “Van-Urmia”.

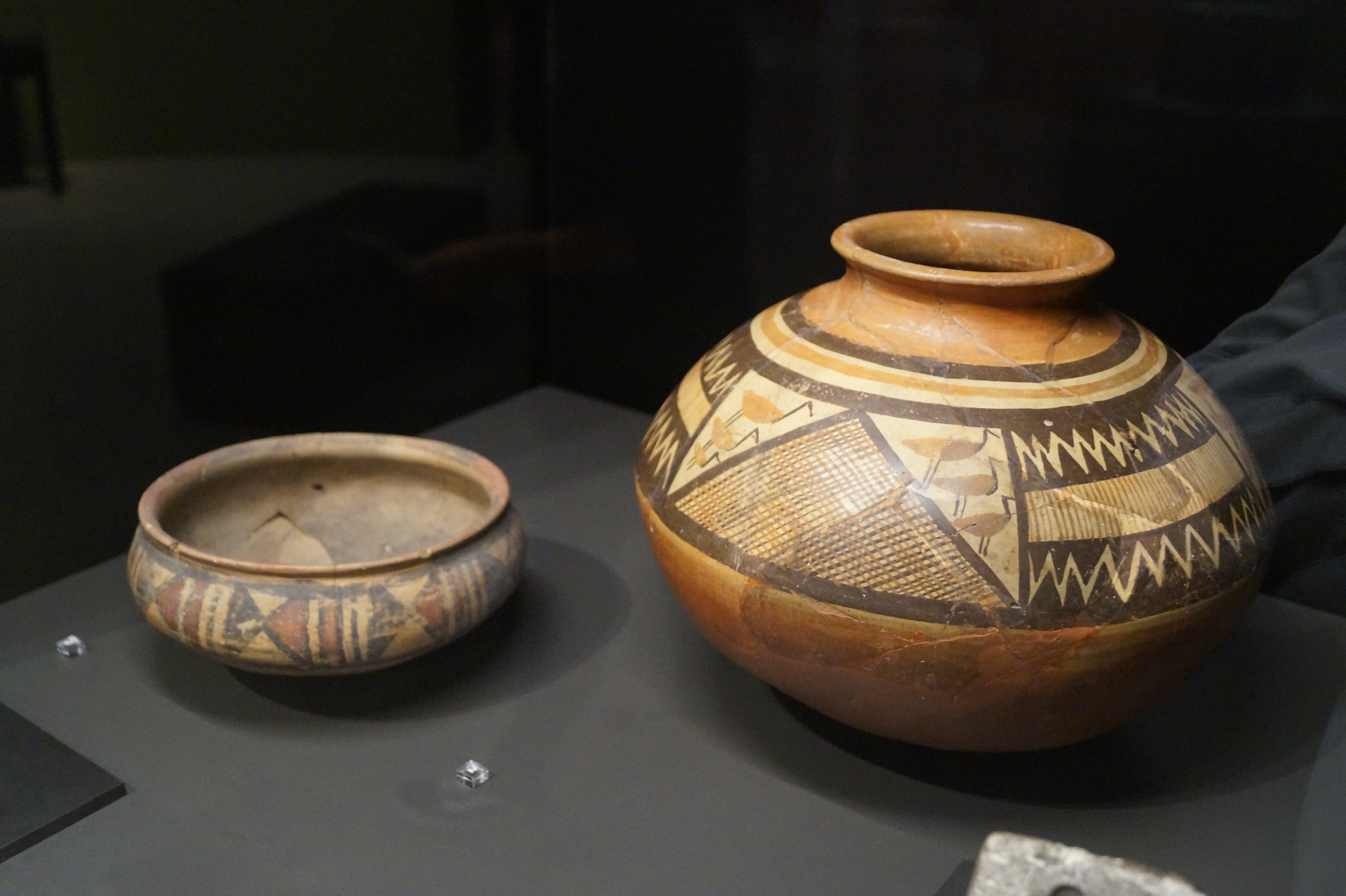
An example of Van-Urmia ware from Haftavān Tepe in Iran, c. 1750 BCE.

== Origins ==
Van-Urmia appeared (about 2200–1300 BCE) after the Early Bronze Age Kura-Araxes culture went into decline. Scholars debate the reasons for this decline. Some proposed that new migrations were the cause, while others suggested internal reasons. Recent archaeogenetic studies revealed that another post-Kura-Araxes culture, the Trialeti-Vanadzor culture which shares some typological features with Urmia ware, emerged as a result of a migration from the Pontic-Caspian steppe. It is possible that the same migration played a role in the formation of Van-Urmia. However, currently, there is no ancient DNA from Van-Urmia burials and the available data from Hasanlu tepe Iron Age only indirectly hints at the presence of a Steppe-related migration.

== See also ==
- Kura–Araxes culture
- Trialeti-Vanadzor culture
- Lchashen–Metsamor culture
- Urartu
- Mannaea
