= Somkhiti =

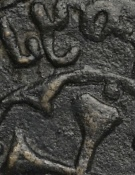
A detail from coin of King David IV with Asomtavruli ႱႾႧ (skht i.e. [of] somekh [ta]) mentioned in his style, c. AD 1124.

Somkhiti (Georgian: სომხითი, [somχitʰi]) was an ambiguous geographic term used in medieval and early modern Georgian historical sources to refer to Armenia on one hand and to the Armeno-Georgian marchlands along the river valleys of Debed and Khrami on the other hand. In the 18th century, Somkhiti was largely replaced with Somkheti (Georgian: სომხეთი, [sɔmχɛtʰi]) as a Georgian exonym for Armenia, but it continued, for some time, to denote the frontier region which is currently divided between Lori, Armenia, and Kvemo Kartli, Georgia. This patch of land was sometimes referred to as "Georgian Armenia" in the 19th-century European sources.

== Etymology ==
The term "Somkhiti"/"Somkheti" is presumed by modern scholars to have been derived from "Sukhmi" or "Sokhmi", the name of an ancient land located by the Assyrian and Urartian records along the upper Euphrates. Per Igor M. Diakonoff, the Georgian name for the country came from the metathesis through Akkadian "Suḫmu" and Hittite "Zūḫma".

According to Professor David Marshall Lang,

The name 'Sokhmi',[...] applied to tribes living along the upper Euphrates, seems to be perpetuated in the medieval and modern Georgian texts as a name for the Armenians in general – 'Somekhi', meaning 'an Armenian' and 'Somkheti' for 'Armenia'. Following the fall of Urartu and the Median invasion, there was further fusion and intermingling of all these tribes, so that 'Hai', 'Arme' and 'Sokhmi' became more or less synonymous. The Armenians themselves adopted the form 'Hai', the Georgians 'Somekhi', while the Iranians took over the form 'Armina', which in Greek or Latin turns into the familiar 'Armenia.'

== See also ==
- Name of Armenia
- Saberdzneti
