= Trialeti-Vanadzor culture =

Bronze Age archaeological culture in the Caucasus

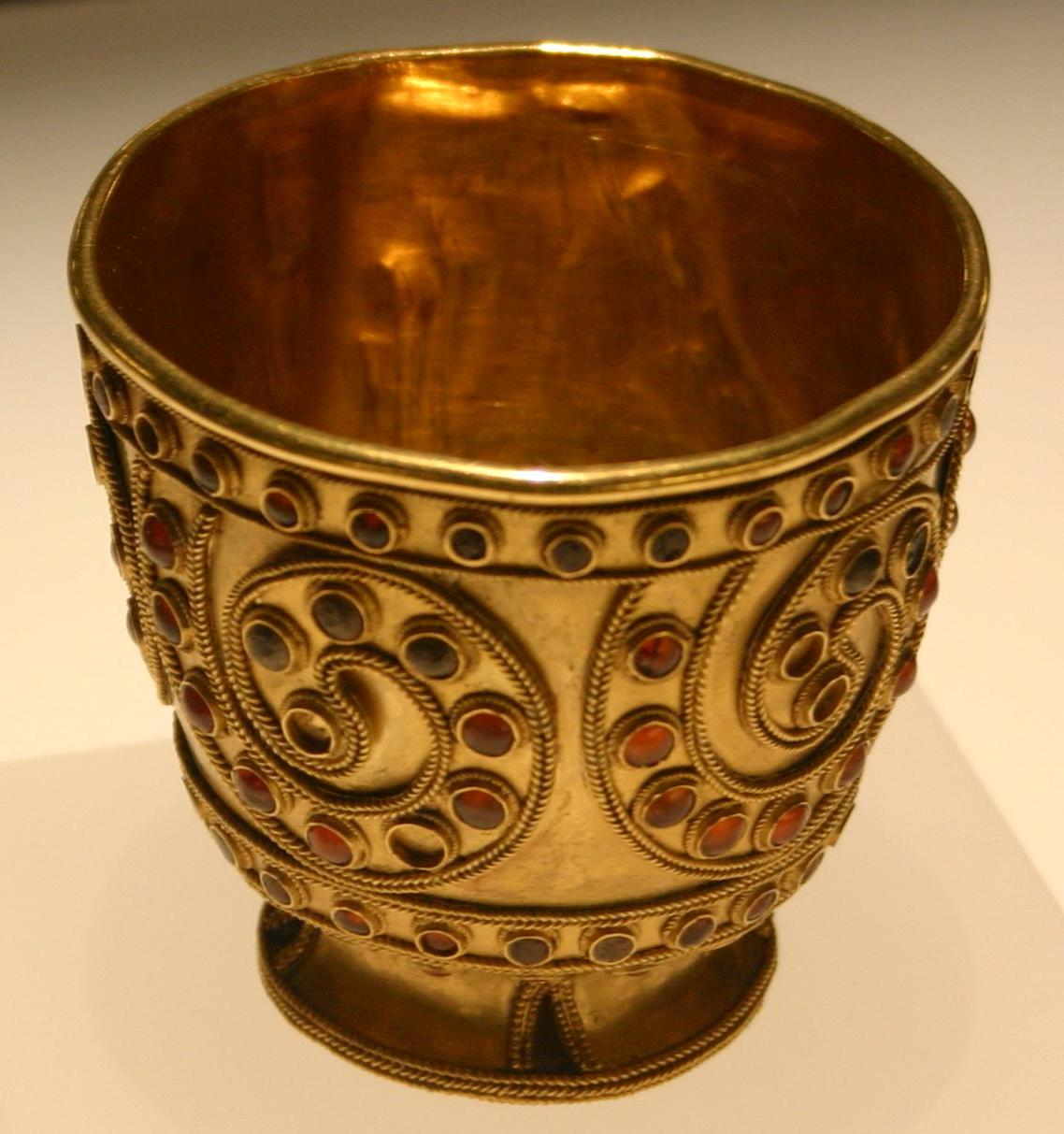
- Geographical range: Transcaucasia
- Period: Middle Bronze Age
- Dates: c. 2200 BC – 1600 BC
- Preceded by: Kura-Araxes culture Martkopi-Bedeni culture
- Followed by: Lchashen-Metsamor culture Karmir-Berd culture

The Trialeti-Vanadzor culture, also known simply as the Trialeti culture and previously referred to as the Trialeti-Kirovakan culture, is named after the Trialeti region in present-day Georgia and the city of Vanadzor in Armenia. This Bronze Age culture flourished between the late 3rd and early 2nd millennium BCE, marking a significant phase of sociocultural and technological development in the South Caucasus. It arose in the territories previously inhabited by the Kura–Araxes culture, representing a notable cultural and material transition that includes advancements in metallurgy, burial practices, and social stratification.

The Trialeti culture was discovered and named by Boris Kuftin in the late 1930s. Several researchers have proposed the Indo-European affiliations of the Trialeti-Vanadzor culture, with recent studies increasingly supporting it as representing an early Proto-Armenian cultural horizon. This hypothesis aligns with broader theories linking the culture to Indo-European migrations and the gradual emergence of Armenian ethnicity and language.

The Trialeti-Vanadzor culture eventually evolved into the Lchashen–Metsamor culture, marking a continued trajectory of development in the Armenian Highlands. It has also been suggested as a cultural precursor to the Hayasa-Azzi confederation mentioned in Hittite records, and has been linked to the Mushki—a people referenced in Assyrian sources.

== Background ==
The Shulaveri–Shomu culture flourished in the region from approximately 6000 to 4000 BCE. This was later succeeded by the Kura–Araxes culture.

The Trialeti-Vanadzor cultural horizon emerged and reached its peak toward the end of the third millennium BCE.

During the final stage of the Middle Bronze Age (c. 1700–1500 BCE), the Trialeti-Vanadzor culture formed part of a broader, interconnected cultural sphere that spanned the South Caucasus and Armenian Highlands. Other major material culture horizons from this period—likely interacting with or overlapping Trialeti-Vanadzor—included Karmir Berd (also known as Tazakend), Karmir Vank (also referred to as Kizil Vank or Van–Urmia), and Sevan-Uzerlik (also called Sevan–Artsakh)

Black-burnished and monochrome painted pottery unearthed at the cemeteries of Ani and Parget Nerkin (Armenian: Պարգետ Ներքին) in Kars Province, Turkey, along with artifacts from Sos Höyük IV in Erzurum Province, show stylistic similarities to Trialeti ceramics. It has been suggested that Sos Höyük IV may have had links to the Hayasa-Azzi confederation.

=== Kurgans ===
By the Middle Bronze Age, evidence of significant social stratification is visible in the richly furnished mound burials associated with the Trialeti-Vanadzor culture. These elaborate tombs bear notable similarities to the Early Kurgan cultures of the Eurasian steppes. The presence of cremation practices, the introduction of painted ceramics, and the dominance of tin-bronze metallurgy reflect cultural transformations and technological advancement during this period.

The culture also exhibits broad regional connectivity. A remarkable example is a bronze cauldron from Trialeti that closely resembles one discovered in Shaft Grave IV at Mycenae, Greece, suggesting possible contact or shared symbolic traditions. The Trialeti-Vanadzor culture demonstrates significant links to the civilizations of the ancient world, particularly the Aegean, as well as to regions further south and east.

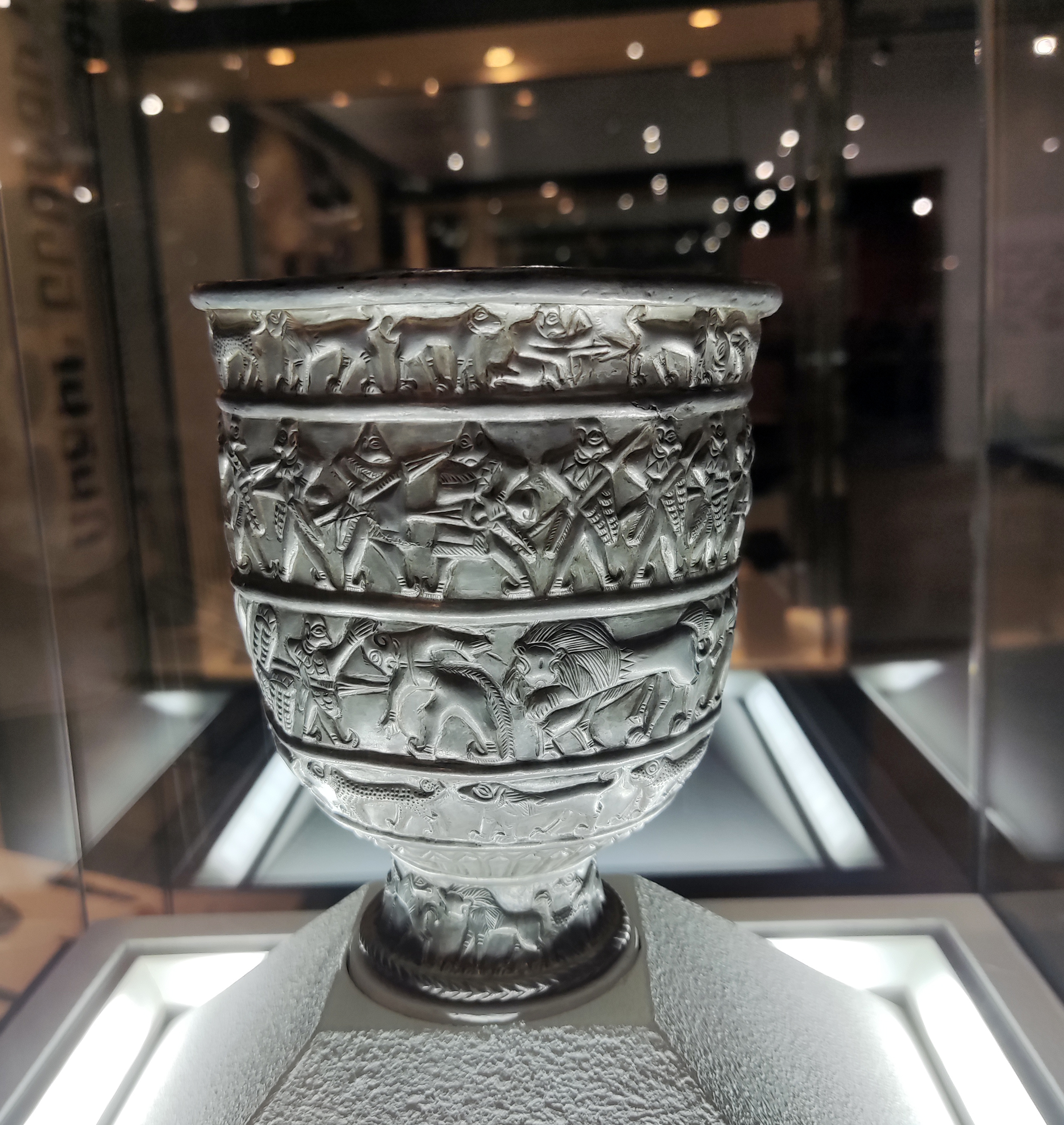
The Karashamb Goblet, discovered in Karashamb, Armenia, dates to around 2100 BCE and is attributed to the Trialeti-Vanadzor culture. The designs on this silver vessel are believed to reflect motifs linked to Indo-European traditions. It is exhibited at the History Museum of Armenia.

The pottery of the Trialeti-Vanadzor culture (both monochrome and polychrome) shows strong stylistic parallels with ceramic traditions across the Armenian Highlands and the Near East. One striking parallel is with the so-called Urmia ware, associated with the region around Lake Urmia in present-day Iran. Similar ceramic forms are also found in the Sevan-Uzerlik culture and the Karmir Berd-Sevan culture, underscoring the shared aesthetic and technological traits among these interconnected traditions.

Excavations at the Trialeti site began between 1936 and 1940 in connection with a hydroelectric development project. During this period, archaeologists uncovered 46 burial mounds. An additional six kurgans were excavated in a second phase between 1959 and 1962.

=== Related kurgans ===
The Martkopi kurgans, roughly contemporary with the earliest Trialeti burials, share architectural and cultural features. These burial sites, located in eastern Georgia, are considered part of the Martkopi–Bedeni cultural horizon, a phase marking the transition into the Middle Bronze Age and viewed as an early expression of the Central Transcaucasian Kurgan tradition.

=== Burial practices ===
The Trialeti–Vanadzor culture is distinguished by its complex burial customs, particularly the entombment of elite individuals in large, richly furnished kurgans under earth and stone mounds. Some of these tombs contained four-wheeled carts, suggesting the high social status of the deceased. Numerous grave goods, including finely crafted gold objects, were uncovered, many of which bear stylistic and technological similarities to those from ancient Iran and Iraq.

The Trialeti culture also demonstrated advanced metalworking, including the use of tin and arsenic alloys. The use of tumulus burials and wheeled vehicles mirrors practices associated with the Kurgan hypothesis and the proposed early Proto-Indo-European speakers. Notably, the black-burnished ceramics found in the earlier Trialeti kurgans closely resemble those of the preceding Kura–Araxes culture.

The conspicuous display of wealth in Trialeti kurgans, a feature shared with other nearby cultures exhibiting similar funerary traditions, is of particular historical significance. This pattern likely reflects influence from more ancient civilizations to the south, particularly those in the Fertile Crescent. The ceramic tradition of the Trialeti–Vanadzor culture is believed to have contributed to the development of the Late Bronze Age Transcaucasian ware, which later spread widely across modern eastern Turkey. This diffusion has been linked to the movement and influence of the Mushki.

== Early Proto-Armenian Cultural Hypothesis ==
The Trialeti-Vanadzor culture is frequently considered a strong candidate for the Proto-Armenian cultural horizon, with multiple academic perspectives supporting this hypothesis. Flourishing in the South Caucasus during the Middle Bronze Age (ca. 2400–1500 BCE), this culture exhibits substantial linguistic, genetic, and material continuities with later Armenian archaeological traditions. Scholars such as Sandra Scham (2025) propose that the Trialeti-Vanadzor culture, emerging in the Armenian Highlands and eastern Anatolia, may reflect one of the earliest Indo-European cultural formations in the region, potentially linked to the nascent stages of Armenian ethnogenesis. This view aligns with earlier propositions by Gamkrelidze and Ivanov (1995), who identified parallels between Indo-European burial customs and the kurgan tombs characteristic of Trialeti-Vanadzor sites.

Genetic studies have added compelling evidence for continuity in the Armenian Highlands. Research by Iosif Lazaridis et al. (2022) confirmed that modern Armenians show strong genetic ties to ancient South Caucasus populations, with notable Bronze Age components linked to steppe ancestry (e.g., R1b-Z2103), suggesting a deep-rooted presence in the region since at least the Trialeti-Vanadzor period. This supports prior findings by Haber et al. (2015), indicating that the Bronze Age admixture in the region shaped the modern Armenian gene pool. Recent archaeogenetic research by Petrosyan and Palyan (2025) further demonstrates that steppe-derived populations migrated into the Armenian Highlands during the mid-3rd millennium BCE, contributing significantly to the formation of regional cultures such as Trialeti-Vanadzor, Sevan-Artsakh, Van-Urmia, and Lchashen-Metsamor. Their findings reveal that even by the end of the Urartian period, the population in the region still retained a high proportion of steppe patrilineal DNA (up to 75%), lending strong support to the Etiuni hypothesis of Armenian ethnogenesis and suggesting that the language of these Bronze and Iron Age cultures was Proto-Armenian.

Archaeologically, the Trialeti-Vanadzor culture's elaborate burial practices, such as the use of four-wheeled carts, gold ornaments, and ritual animal sacrifices, mirror Indo-European traditions and find echoes in later Armenian sites like Metsamor and Lchashen. Kossian (1997) further highlights ceramic and metallurgical continuities that suggest a direct cultural lineage from Trialeti-Vanadzor through the Lchashen-Metsamor horizon. Joan Aruz (2008) emphasizes that these material and symbolic continuities place Armenian ethnogenesis within a broader network of Bronze Age Indo-European cultures stretching across Anatolia and the Aegean, as evidenced by shared artifact types such as cauldrons and chariots.

Linguistic studies reinforce these connections: the Armenian language, while a unique branch of the Indo-European family, shares phonological and lexical similarities with Greek, suggesting a shared contact zone within the broader Yamnaya horizon during the Bronze Age. Using a mathematical analysis borrowed from evolutionary biology, Donald Ringe and Tandy Warnow propose an evolutionary tree in which Pre-Armenian and Pre-Greek formed a closely related subgroup after 2500 BC. Similarly, David W. Anthony suggests that Pre-Armenian had already begun to separate as early as 2800 BC. Yediay et al. (2024) demonstrate that steppe ancestry, first identified in the South Caucasus during the Middle Bronze Age, coinciding with the cultural shift from the Kura-Araxes to the Trialeti-Vanadzor culture, persisted into Urartian and pre-Urartian populations. This ancestry, derived from the same western Yamnaya source as contemporaneous Aegean groups, supports the Graeco-Armenian hypothesis and indicates that a proto-Armenian language was present in the Armenian Highlands by the end of the 5th millennium BP

Further linguistic evidence comes from Indo-European vocabulary and its archaeological correlates. Rasmus G. Bjørn argues that the direct descendant of Proto-Indo-European *h₁eḱwos moved with Armenian across the Caucasus into Southwest Asia during the late 3rd millennium BC, contributing to a widespread Wanderwort found across ancient Near Eastern languages from Hurrian to Sumerian and Egyptian. He associates this linguistic dispersal with the Bronze Age expansion of horses from the Western Steppe Zone, noting that the dated genetic signal for this expansion coincides chronologically with the proposed spread of Armenian into the Caucasus. Bjørn further argues that loanwords from a likely early Armenian source preserve evidence for an earlier meaning of the Armenian eš, later meaning "donkey", and interprets this as a semantic shift from "horse" to "equid". He relates this development to the introduction of new horse populations associated with the Mitanni Aryan speakers in the early second millennium BC. The alternative Sumerian designation for horse, which can be translated as "donkey of the mountains", is likewise interpreted as evidence for a montane route of entry into Southwest Asia.

These overlapping lines of evidence have led many scholars to posit the Trialeti-Vanadzor culture as a crucial stage in the long trajectory of Armenian ethnogenesis, although debates continue regarding the precise origins and development of the Proto-Armenians.

== See also ==
- Kura–Araxes culture
- Van-Urmia culture
- Lchashen–Metsamor culture
- Shulaveri–Shomu culture
- Prehistoric Georgia
- Prehistoric Armenia
- Hayasa-Azzi
