= Mushki =

Iron Age people of Anatolia

The Mushki (sometimes transliterated as Muški) were an Iron Age people of Anatolia who appear in sources from Assyria but not from the Hittites. Several authors have connected them with the Moschoi (Μόσχοι) of Greek sources and the Georgian tribe of the Meskhi. Josephus Flavius identified the Moschoi with the Biblical Meshech. Two different groups are called Muški in Assyrian sources (Diakonoff 1984:115), one from the 12th to the 9th centuries BC near the confluence of the Arsanias and the Euphrates ("Eastern Mushki") and the other from the 8th to the 7th centuries BC in Cappadocia and Cilicia ("Western Mushki"). Assyrian sources clearly identify the Western Mushki with the Phrygians, but later Greek sources then distinguish between the Phrygians and the Moschoi.

Identification of the Eastern Mushki with the Western Mushki is uncertain, but it is possible that at least some of the Eastern Mushki migrated to Cilicia in the 10th to the 8th centuries BC. Although almost nothing is known about what language (or languages) the Eastern or Western Mushki spoke, they have been variously identified as being speakers of a Phrygian, Armenian, Anatolian, or Georgian language.

== Eastern Mushki ==
The Eastern Mushki appear to have moved into Hatti in the 12th century BC, around the time that the Hittite Empire collapsed.

Together with the Urumu and Kaskas (Apishlu), they attempted to invade the Middle Assyrian Empire's Anatolian provinces of Alzi (Alshe) and Puruhuzzi in about 1160 BC, but they were pushed back and subjugated by Ashur-Dan I. In 1115 BC, the Mushki advanced further, penetrating into Kadmuhi, along the Upper Tigris. After being turned away by Tiglath-pileser I, the Mushki apparently settled in Alzi.

Whether the Mushki initially moved into the core Hittite areas from the east or west has been a matter of some discussion by historians. It has been speculated that the Mushki were connected to the spread of the so-called Transcaucasian ceramic ware, which appeared as far west as modern Elazığ, Turkey in the late second millennium BC. This ceramic ware is believed to have been developed in the South Caucasus region, possibly by the Trialeti-Vanadzor culture originally, which suggests an eastern homeland for the Mushki.

== Western Mushki ==
In the 8th century BC, Tabal became the most influential of the Neo-Hittite polities, and the Mushki under Mita entered an anti-Assyrian alliance with Tabal and Carchemish. The alliance was soon defeated by Sargon of Assyria, who captured Carchemish and drove back Mita to his own province. Ambaris of Tabal was diplomatically married to an Assyrian princess, and received the province of Hilakku under Assyrian dominion, but in 713 BC, Ambaris was deposed and Tabal became a fully fledged Assyrian province.

In 709 BC, the Mushki re-emerged as allies of Assyria, Sargon naming Mita as his friend. It appears that Mita had captured and handed over to the Assyrians emissaries of Urikki, king of Que, who were sent to negotiate an anti-Assyrian contract with Urartu, as they passed through his territory.

According to Assyrian military intelligence reports to Sargon recorded on clay tablets found in the Royal Archives of Nineveh by Sir Henry Layard, the Cimmerians invaded Urartu from Mannai in 714 BC. From there they turned west along the coast of the Black Sea as far as Sinope, and then headed south towards Tabal, in 705 BC campaigning against an Assyrian army in central Anatolia, resulting in the death of Sargon II, although they were cleared from Assyrian ruled territory. Macqueen (1986:157) and others have speculated that the Mushki under Mita may have participated in the Assyrian campaign and were forced to flee to western Anatolia, disappearing from Assyrian accounts, but entering the periphery of Greek historiography as king Midas of Phrygia.

Rusas II of Urartu in the 7th century BC fought the Mushki-ni to his west, before he entered an alliance with them against Assyria.

Some scholars have speculated that the Western Mushki were not Phrygians, but they conquered the Phrygians, or were conquered by the Phrygians, and the two became conflated with one another.

== Hypothesized relations with modern Transcaucasian peoples ==
=== Mushki and Armenians ===
According to Igor Diakonoff, the Mushki were a Thraco-Phrygian group who carried their Proto-Armenian language from the Balkans across Asia Minor, mixing with Hurrians (and Urartians) and Luwians along the way. Diakonoff theorized that the root of the name Mushki was "Mush" (or perhaps "Mus," "Mos," or "Mosh") with the addition of the Armenian plural suffix -k'. Armen Petrosyan clarifies this, suggesting that -ki was a Proto-Armenian form of the Classical Armenian -k' (compare to Ancient Greek -κοί) and etymologizes "Mush" as meaning "worker" or "agriculturalist."

Some have placed (at least the Eastern) Mushki homeland in the Armenian Highlands and South Caucasus region. It is possible that at least some of the Mushki were Armenian-speakers or speakers of a closely related language.

Pliny in the 1st century AD mentions the Moscheni in southern Armenia ("Armenia" at the time stretching south and west to the Mediterranean, bordering on Cappadocia). In Byzantine historiography, Moschoi was a name equivalent to or considered as the ancestors of "Cappadocians" (Eusebius) with their capital at Mazaca (later Caesarea Mazaca, modern Develi, Kayseri). According to Armenian tradition, the city of Mazaca was founded by and named after Mishak (Misak, Moshok), a cousin and general of the legendary patriarch Aram. Scholars have proposed a connection between the name Mishak and Mushki.

The Armenian region of Mokk' and the city of Mush (Muş) may derive their names from the Mushki.

According to Professor James R. Russell of Harvard University, the Georgian designation for Armenians, "Somekhi", refers to the Mushki.

However, the connection between the Mushki and Armenian languages is quite unclear and many modern scholars have rejected a direct linguistic relationship if the Mushki were Phrygian speakers. Additionally, genetic research does not support significant admixture into the Armenian nation after 1200 BC, making the Mushki, if they indeed migrated from a Balkan or western Anatolian homeland during or after the Bronze Age Collapse, unlikely candidates for the Proto-Armenians.

=== Mushki and Georgians ===
Some Georgian historians have proposed that the Mushki, together with other ancient tribes of Asia Minor mentioned in Assyrian sources (such as the Tibal and others), were "proto-Georgian" tribes, which contributed to the formation of the eastern Georgian Kingdom of Iberia.

According to Donald Rayfield, Mushki, Moschoi, and Meskhi are floating names. He argues the Mushki may have worshiped the Hittite moon god Arma and the Luwian god Santush (Santa/Sandan), comparing these names to the phonetically similar pagan Iberian gods Armazi and Zaden, whose idols were overthrown by Christian missionaries in the 4th century AD in Iberia. Rayfield's theories are speculative, however, and nothing is actually known of the Mushki's religious convictions.

== Moschoi ==
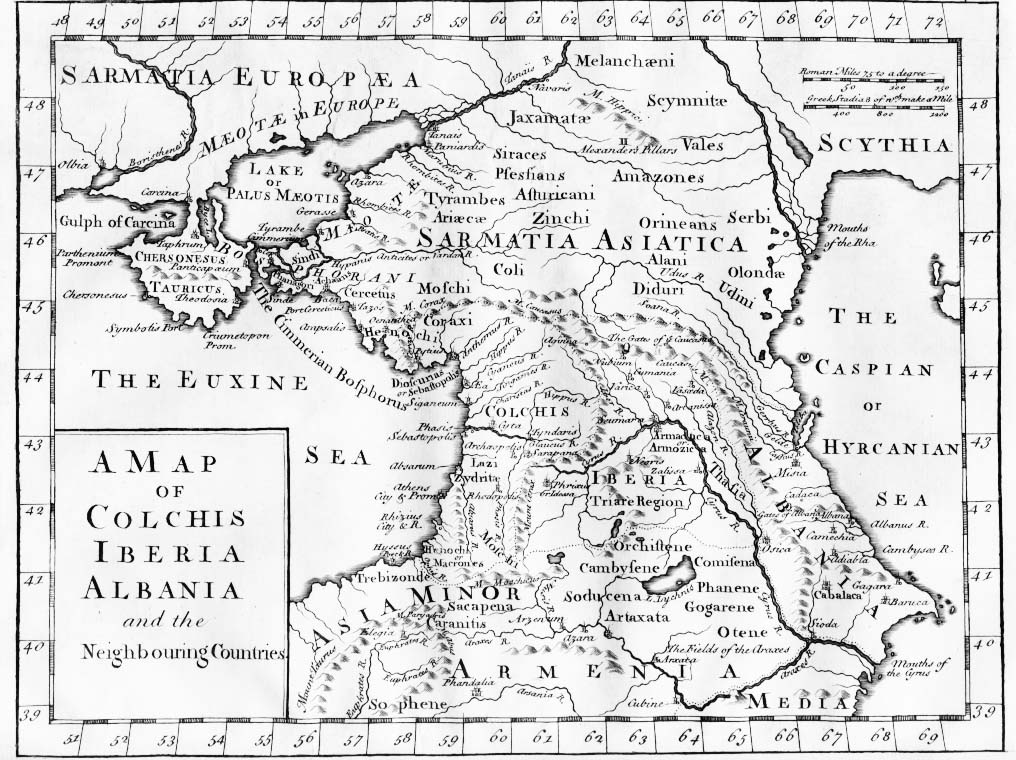
On this map, based on ancient Greek literary sources, the Moschi are located in the southern approaches of Colchis. London, c 1770

Hecataeus of Miletus (c. 550 – 476 BC) speaks of the Moschi as "Colchians", situated next to the Matieni.

According to Herodotus, the equipment of the Moschoi was similar to that of the Tibareni, Macrones, Mossynoeci and Mardae, with wooden caps upon their heads, and shields and small spears, on which long points were set. All these tribes formed the 19th satrapy of the Achaemenid empire, extending along the southeast of the Euxine, or the Black Sea, and bounded on the south by the lofty chain of the Armenian mountains.

Strabo locates the Moschoi in two places. The first location is somewhere in modern Abkhazia on the eastern shore of the Black Sea, in agreement with Stephan of Byzantium quoting Hellanicus. The second location Moschice (Moschikê) – in which was a temple of Leucothea, once famous for its wealth, but plundered by Pharnaces and Mithridates – was divided between the Colchians, Armenians, and Iberians (cf. Mela, III. 5.4; Pliny VI.4.). These latter Moschoi were obviously Meskhi or Mesx’i (where Greek χ, chi, is Georgian ხ, x), located in southern Georgia. Procopius calls them Meschoi and says that they were subject to the Iberians (i.e., Georgians), and had embraced Christianity, the religion of their masters.

== Biblical Meshech ==
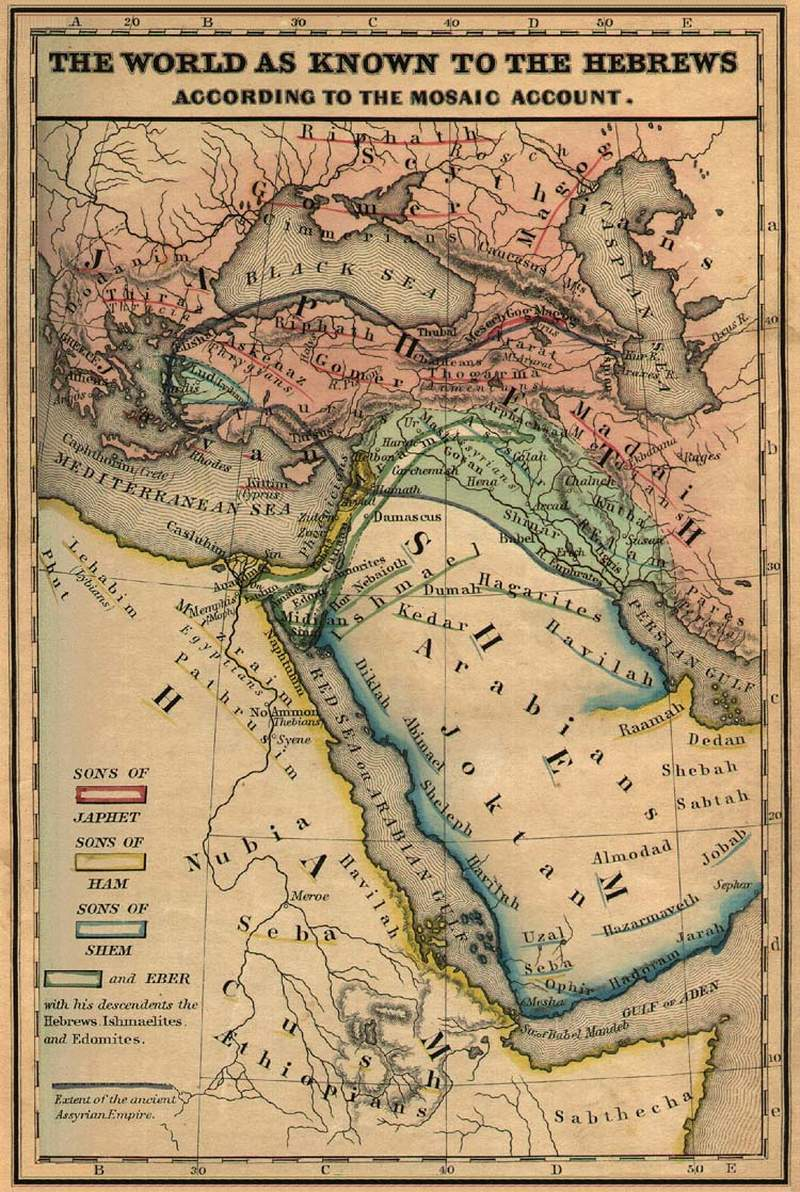
"The World as known to the Hebrews", a map from the Historical Textbook and Atlas of Biblical Geography by Coleman (1854) locates Meshech together with Gog and Magog in the southern Caucasus.

Josephus Flavius identified the Cappadocian Moschoi with the Biblical Japhetic tribe descended from Meshech in his writings on the Genealogy of the Nations in Genesis 10, while Hippolytus of Rome connected Meshech with Illyrians. Meshech is named with Tubal as a principality of the prince of Gog and Magog in Ezekiel 38:2 and 39:1.

== See also ==
- Hayasa-Azzi
- Kaskians
- Urumeans
- Phrygians
- Trialeti-Vanadzor culture
- Tabal
- Moschia
- Gog and Magog
- Moksha and Mushki
