= Zarmayr =

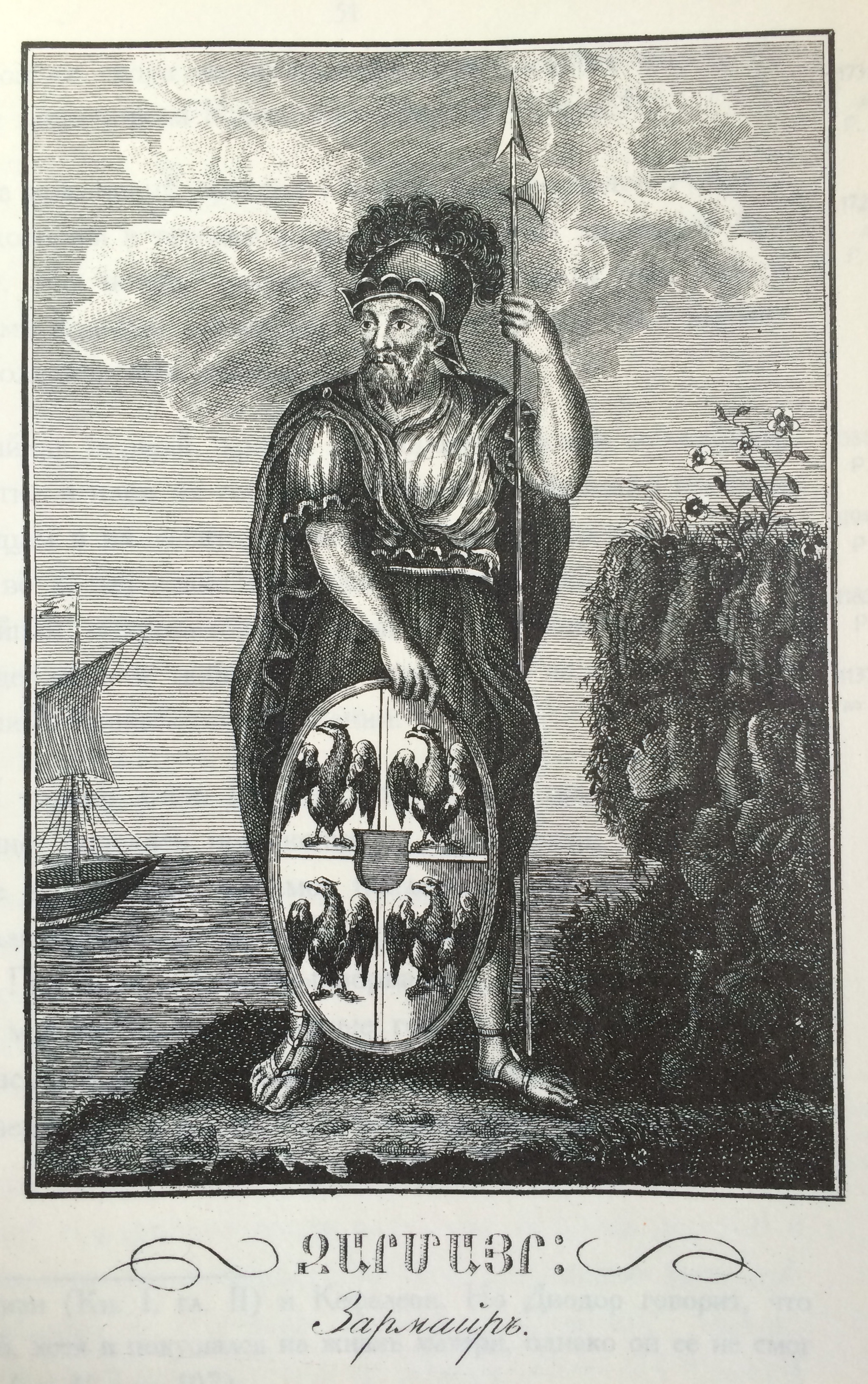
19th-century depiction of Zarmayr

Zarmayr (Armenian: Զարմայր) was a legendary Armenian patriarch descended from Hayk. He appears only in the history of Movses Khorenatsi (5th century or later), who writes that Zarmayr was sent by the Assyrian Teutamos to take part in the Trojan War on the side of the Trojans at the head of "a small Ethiopian army" and was killed (Khorenatsi adds: "by Achilles, I would like to think, and not by any other hero"). He was the successor of Hawroy and the predecessor of Perch as patriarch. According to Ferdinand Justi, his name is composed of the words zarm 'family, line' and ayr 'man'. H. Avkerian identifies Zarmayr with Memnon, who according to Eusebius and Diodorus commanded an Assyrian and Ethiopian army in the Trojan War. The story of Zarmayr is repeated by a number of Armenian historians after Khorenatsi.
