= Paroyr Skayordi =

King of ancient Armenia

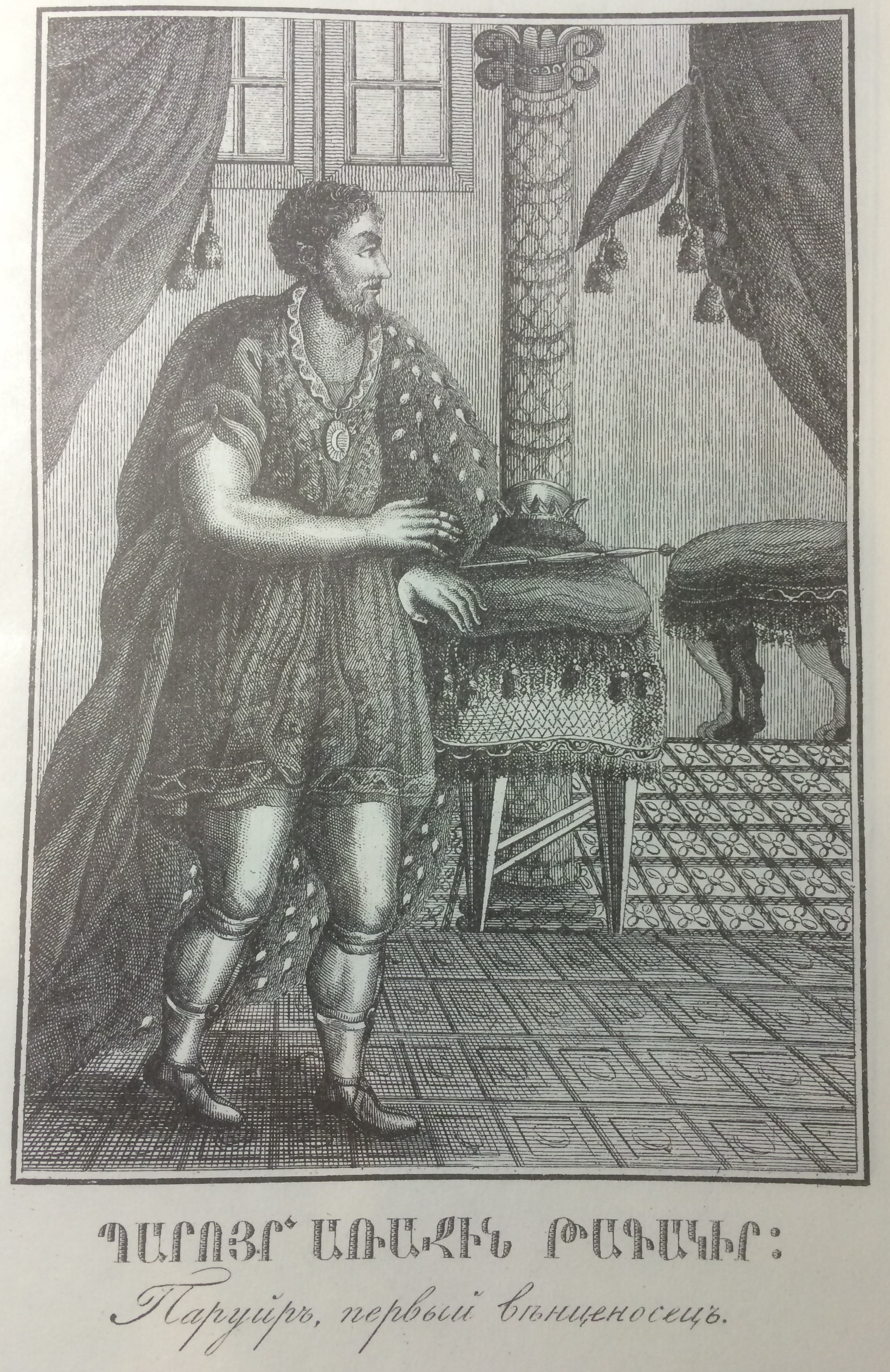
An imaginary 19th-century depiction of King Paruyr, son of Skayordi

Paroyr Skayordi (also Paruyr, Old Armenian: Պարոյր Սկայորդի) or Paroyr, son of Skayordi, was an Armenian king mentioned in the history of Movses Khorenatsi in the context of events of the 7th century BC. Khorenatsi describes him as a descendant of the Armenian patriarch Hayk who helped the Median king "Varbakes" defeat the Assyrian king "Sardanapalus" and received the crown of Armenia in return, becoming "the first to reign in Armenia." Different theories exist about the possible historical identity of Paroyr Skayordi, whose second name is sometimes interpreted as meaning "son of a Saka/Scythian" or "of Saka lineage." According to one view, he is identifiable with the Scythian king Partatua, who lived in the first half of the 7th century BC. Other scholars believe that he was the ruler of Arme-Shupria (according to one theory, an early polity of the Armenians) and allied with the Medes against Assyria around 612 BC. Others believe that he was the ruler of a Scythian land within the Etiuni confederation, which, according to one hypothesis, was the early polity of the Armenians.

== Name ==
Hrachia Acharian derives the name Paroyr (Paruyr in modern Armenian pronunciation) from the identical Armenian word paroyr 'circle, spiral'. Acharian derives Skayordi, the name of Paroyr's father according to Movses Khorenatsi, from the words skay 'giant' and ordi 'child, son'. Grigor Ghapantsyan derives the word skay from the ethnonym of the Saka or Scythians and thus interprets Skayordi as meaning 'son of a Saka' or, more precisely, 'of Saka lineage; a Scythian'. Correspondingly, Ghapantsyan considers the name Paroyr to be a cognate of Partatua/Protothyes, the name of a 7th-century BC Scythian king known from Herodotus and Akkadian sources. Gevorg Jahukyan instead connects Skayordi and skay with the ethnonym of the Thracian tribe called the Skaioi, which according to him comes from Proto-Indo-European *(s)kāi- ('bright'). In Tork Dalalyan's view, these etymologies are not mutually exclusive, as the Thracians often mixed with Scythian groups. The Scythian tribes may have been called by names with the meaning 'bright' because of their lighter skin. Suren Yeremian notes that a derivation of Skayordi from Scythian *Spakāya (Akkadian Ishpakaya, the name of Partatua's predecessor) is also possible. Igor Diakonoff has pointed out that the connection of Paroyr with Partatua/Protothyes poses certain difficulties: Paroyr is an Armenian development of a Parthian form, Parōdh, which cannot be derived from the same Old Iranian origin as Partatua (*Paratatava). Thus, it is not clear how a similar sounding but different Parthian name came to replace the Scythian original, since the memory of Partatua the Scythian king could not have been transmitted to the Armenians through the Parthians. Martin Schwartz rejects any connection between Paroyr and Partatua, instead deriving the former from Old Iranian *uparauda- via Middle Parthian *uparōδ 'tall', thus interpreting Paroyr Skayordi as "Tall, son of Giant."

== Sources ==
Paroyr Skayordi (or i Skayordwoyn Paroyr 'Paroyr, son of Skayordi') is mentioned in the history of Movses Khorenatsi as a descendant of the Armenian patriarch Hayk who helped the Median king "Varbakes" (Note: Varbakes (or Arbakes) is mentioned in Eusebius's Chronicon and by Diodorus Siculus as a Median king who defeated Sardanapalus with the assistance of the Babylonian general Belesus.) defeat the Assyrian king "Sardanapalus" (a corruption of Ashurbanipal in classical sources, a composite figure of the last Assyrian kings) and received the crown of Armenia in return. Paroyr is called "the first to reign in Armenia." According to some authors, this Varbakes should be identified with the historical Median king Cyaxares, who allied with the Babylonians to destroy Assyria at the end of the 7th century BC. Paroyr's son and successor was called Hracheay, whom Khorenatsi calls a contemporary of Nebuchadnezzar II.

=== Genealogy ===
Ancestry of Paroyr Skayordi according to Movses Khorenatsi
- Paroyr, son of Skayordi
  - Skayordi
    - Kaypak
      - Yusak
        - Hoy
          - Bazuk
            - Arbun
              - Perch
                - Zarmayr
                  - Hawroy
                    - Gzak
                      - Endzak
                        - Hrant
                          - Gorak
                            - Vstamkar
                              - Norayr
                                - Shavarsh
                                  - Arnak
                                    - Ampak
                                      - Haykak
                                        - Vashtak
                                          - Havanak
                                            - Sur
                                              - Parnak
                                                - Zavan
                                                  - Arbak
                                                    - Paret
                                                      - Anushawan
                                                        - Ara, son of Ara
                                                          - Ara the Handsome
                                                            - Aram
                                                              - Harmay
                                                                - Gegham
                                                                  - Amasia
                                                                    - Aramayis
                                                                      - Aramaneak
                                                                        - Hayk

== Historical identity ==
According to one theory, Paroyr Skayordi is identifiable with the Scythian king Partatua. Partatua was a contemporary of the Assyrian kings Esarhaddon and Ashurbanipal and probably allied with the Assyrians after marrying Esarhaddon's daughter. In Maxim Katvalian's view, Paroyr Skayordi/Partatua was the ruler of a Scythian kingdom in the Armenian highlands. Paroyr/Partatua's father allied with King Rusa II of Urartu against Assyria, hence Khorenatsi's report that Skayordi (father of Paroyr) gave refuge to the sons of Sennacherib after they killed their father. Paroyr/Partatua allied with the Assyrians. Katvalian identifies Partatua's son and successor Madyes with Armenian Hracheay. (Note: Note that modern scholars believe that Scythian presence in West Asia in this period was a series of extended Scythian raids into the region, not a period of Scythian rule.) Boris Piotrovsky suggests that Paroyr was the Armenian ruler of Scythian origin of one of the smaller countries subject to Urartu located near the northwestern border of Assyria, either Arme or an adjacent land. Having helped the Medes and Babylonians defeat Assyria, he received autonomy and was recognized as king. For this reason, he was later remembered as the first king in the Armenian tradition. Similarly, Suren Yeremian believes that the Armenian Paroyr is not identifiable with Partatua, who lived in the first half of the 7th century BC, but with a later ruler of Arme-Shupria (the early nucleus of the Armenian kingdom, according to one theory) who allied with the Medes and participated in the final defeat of the Assyrians at the Battle of Nineveh around 612 BC. After this, Paroyr was recognized as king of Arme-Shupria by Cyaxares. Gevorg Tiratsian believes that Khorenatsi's account takes the name and certain characteristics of Partatua for the figure of Paroyr and is an echo of interactions between the Scythians and Armenians in this period. Felix Ter-Martirosov asserts that those Scythians who assimilated into the early Armenians after the destruction of Scythian power in West Asia brought with them the memory of their first king, Partatua, whose name later transformed into Paroyr in Armenian.

More recently, Armen Petrosyan, in the context of the hypothesis that the confederation of Etiuni was the early polity of the Armenians, has argued that Paroyr was likely the ruler of a Scythian constituent land of Etiuni, positing an Armeno-Scythian alliance around the time of the collapse of Urartu and Assyria. This is supported by the mentioning in an Urartian cuneiform inscription of Shagaputara, ruler of Ishqugulkhi (Išqugulḫi), (Note: Located to the north of Gyumri in modern-day Armenia) one of the lands of Etiuni. Shagapatura has been interpreted as Scythian *Šaga-putara 'son of a Saka', corresponding to Armenian Skayordi, while Ishqugulkhi has been interpreted as the Urartian rendering of one variant of the ethnonym of the Scythians.
