= Lchashen–Metsamor culture =

Bronze and Iron Age culture in Armenia

Lchashen-Metsamor culture
- Geographical range: South Caucasus
- Period: Late Bronze Age, Iron Age
- Dates: circa 1,500 BCE — circa 700 BCE
- Major sites: Metsamor, Lchashen
- Preceded by: Trialeti–Vanadzor culture
- Followed by: Etiuni, Urartu

Lchashen-Metsamor culture (Armenian: Լճաշեն-մեծամորյան մշակույթ) is an archeological culture of the Late Bronze Age and Early Iron Age (1500-700 BCE) in the South Caucasus. It was mainly spread in areas of present-day Armenia. Lchashen-Metsamor pottery was also found in the Ağrı Province of Turkey and in southern Georgia.

== Description ==
A specific grooved pottery is associated with this culture. The construction of widespread cyclopean fortresses at the end of the Bronze Age and cities, indicate population growth and urbanization in the territory of Armenia.

A number of bronze items, such as bronze belts, have been discovered at Lchashen–Metsamor sites. A fully preserved four-wheeled chariot was found at Lchashen.

== Categorization ==
Archaeologists have divided the Lchashen–Metsamor culture into five main stages.

Late Bronze Age - LM 1,2,3

Early Iron Age - LM 4.5

The sixth stage, which arises from the local synthesis of Urartian culture, has been left out.

== Identity ==
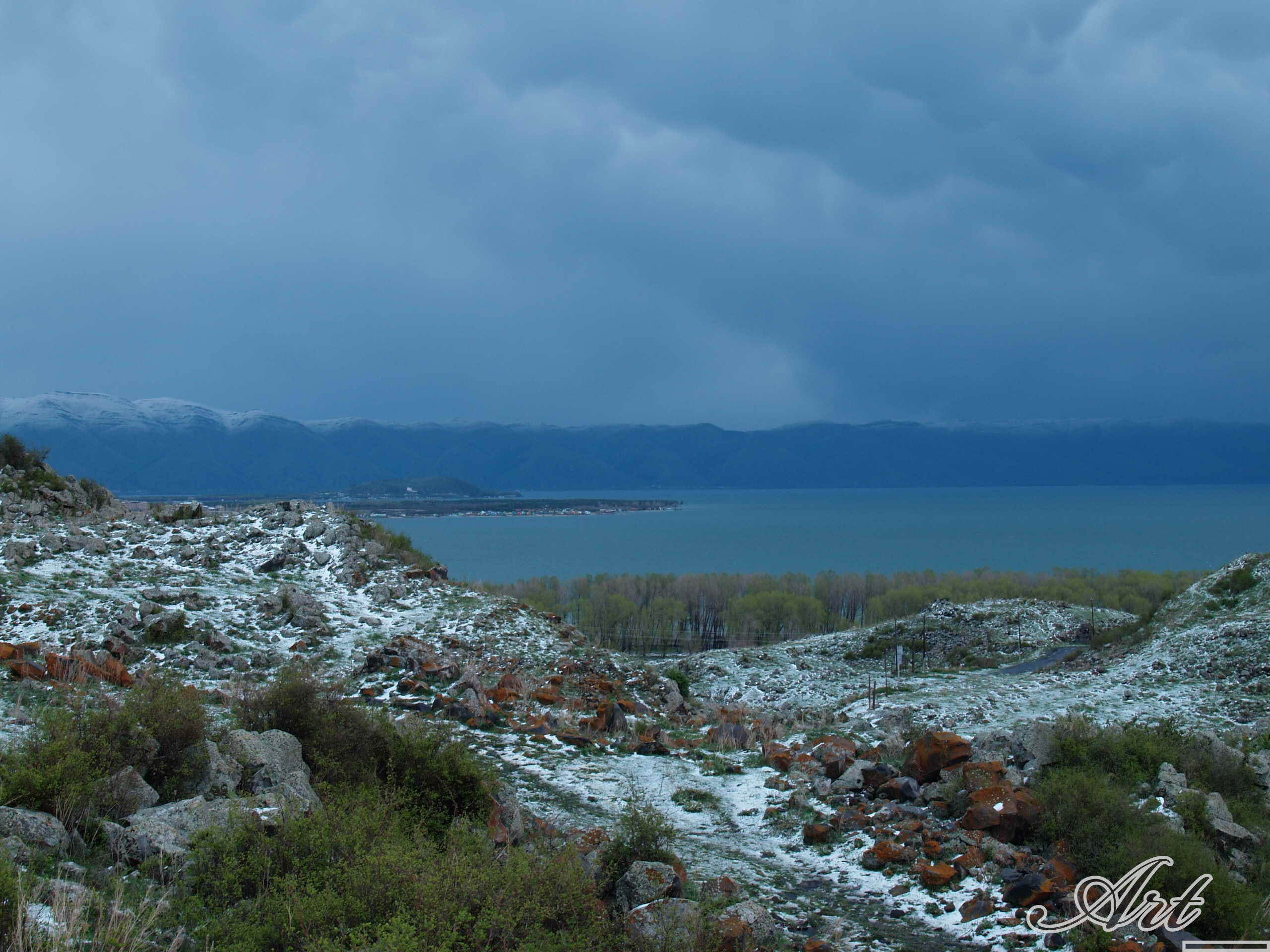
The Lchashen site, along Lake Sevan in Armenia.

Archaeologists connect the Lchashen–Metsamor culture with the Etiuni tribal union attested in Urartian cuneiform.

== Later history ==
The culture began declining in the 8th century BC when Argishti I, the king of Urartu, crossed the Araxes River with his army. Following the appearance of Urartian culture in the region, a syncretic Lchashen-Metsamor VI layer emerged.

== Paleogenetics ==
An article by Damgaard (2018) dedicated to the genetic study of ancient inhabitants of the Eurasian steppes published the ancient DNA of two people from Lchashen burials. Samples included Y-DNA I2a2b-L596 and Mitochondrial DNA HV0a and J1b1a.

== See also ==
- Urartu
- Etiuni
- Prehistoric Armenia
