= Proto-Armenian language =

Reconstructed language

Proto-Armenian
- Reconstruction of: Armenian languages
- Reconstructed ancestor: Proto-Indo-European

Proto-Armenian is the reconstructed, unattested ancestral stage of the Armenian language, encompassing its development from Proto-Indo-European to the earliest attestations of Classical Armenian. As Armenian is the sole known member of its branch of the Indo-European languages, its prehistory cannot be reconstructed through direct comparison with closely related languages. Linguists instead combine internal reconstruction with evidence from Proto-Indo-European and other Indo-European branches. Armenian is an independent branch of the Indo-European family and is distinguished by its characteristic phonological changes, including a predominance of satem-like developments, although it is not classified as either a centum or satem language.

== Definition and origins ==
Proto-Armenian, as the ancestor of only one living language branch, lacks a rigid, singular definition, but it is generally held by scholars to encompass the complex developmental stages of Armenian between Proto-Indo-European and the earliest written attestations of Classical Armenian in the 5th century AD, beginning with the Bible translation of Mesrop Mashtots. Although it is not a proto-language in the strict comparative sense of giving rise to multiple sub-languages, "Proto-Armenian" remains the standard linguistic term for the dialectal lineage defined by distinctive phonological changes within the Indo-European family, most notably exhibiting more satemization than centumization, though without belonging strictly to either group. Linguists situate Proto-Armenian within an early dialect continuum alongside Proto-Greek, Phrygian, Albanian, and Proto-Indo-Iranian, positioning it conceptually between Western centum dialects and Eastern satem dialects. Proposed phylogenetic models place the divergence of Pre-Armenian as early as approximately 2800 BC, with computational models proposing a close relationship between Pre-Armenian and Pre-Greek after 2500 BC, a grouping reflected in shared phonological, morphological, and lexical features such as the verbal augment, prothetic vowels, and the change *s > *h, alongside unique morphological connections to Balto-Slavic languages. Recent archaeogenetic studies associate the emergence of Proto-Armenian in the Armenian Highlands with Middle Bronze Age populations of the Trialeti-Vanadzor culture carrying western Yamnaya-related Steppe ancestry shared with contemporaneous Aegean groups. Throughout its pre-attested development, Proto-Armenian underwent extensive adstrate and substrate language contact, absorbing multiple lexical layers from Anatolian languages (Luwian, Hittite), Hattic, Hurro-Urartian languages, Semitic languages (Akkadian, Aramaic), and Iranian languages (Persian, Parthian), as well as secondary influences from Greek and Arabic.

Further linguistic evidence comes from Indo-European horse terminology. Rasmus G. Bjørn argues that descendants of Proto-Indo-European *h₁eḱwos spread with Armenian across the Caucasus into Southwest Asia in the late 3rd millennium BC, contributing to a Wanderwort attested in early literary languages from Hurrian through Sumerian and Egyptian. He associates this distribution with the Bronze Age expansion of horses from the Western Steppe Zone, whose dated genetic signal coincides with the proposed spread of Armenian into the Caucasus. Bjørn interprets Armenian ēš, "donkey", as a semantic shift from "horse" to "equid". The alternative Sumerian designation for the horse ("donkey of the mountains") is likewise interpreted as evidence for a montane route of entry into Southwest Asia.

== Phonological development of Proto-Armenian ==
The Proto-Armenian sound changes are varied and eccentric (such as *dw- yielding erk-) and, in many cases, uncertain. That prevented Armenian from being immediately recognized as an Indo-European branch in its own right, and it was assumed to be simply a very divergent Iranian language until Heinrich Hübschmann established its independent character in 1874.

The development of voicing contrasts in Armenian is notable in being quite similar to that seen in Germanic, a fact that was significant in the formation of the Glottalic Theory. The Armenian Consonant Shift has often been compared to the famous Grimm's Law in Germanic, because in both cases, Proto-Indo-European voiceless stops became voiceless aspirates (with some complications with regard to Proto-Indo-European *p), the voiced stops became voiceless, and the voiced aspirates became voiced stops. Meanwhile, Armenian shares the vocalization of word initial laryngeals before consonants with Greek and Phrygian: Proto-Indo-European *h₂nḗr ("man", "force") renders Greek anḗr, Armenian ayr from a Proto-Armenian *aynr and Phrygian anar ("man"), which may be compared to Latin Nero and neriōsus ("strict"), Albanian njeri, Persian nar, Sanskrit nara, and Welsh nerth.

In certain contexts, the aspirated stops are further reduced to w, h or zero in Armenian: Proto-Indo-European (accusative) *pódm̥ "foot" > Armenian ոտն otn vs. Greek (accusative) póda, Proto-Indo-European *tréyes "three" > Armenian երեք erekʿ vs. Greek treis.

PIE stop consonants in Armenian
PIE	→ Armenian	Special developments and exceptions
*p	հ h	∅ (before օ ō); ւ w (after vowel); փ pʿ
*t	թ tʿ	տ t (after sibilant); յ y (between vowels); դ d (after ր r); ∅ (before consonant); ք kʿ (PIE *tw → Arm. ք kʿ); ւ w (before ր r and between back-vowels); ն n (PIE *-nt → Arm. ն n)
*ḱ	ս s	շ š (PIE *ḱw → Arm. շ š); ւ w (before ր r); ∅ (before consonant)
*k	ք kʿ	խ x (PIE *kH → Arm. խ x); գ g (PIE *[R]k → Arm. գ g); չ čʿ (PIE *ky → Arm. չ čʿ)
*kʷ	չ čʿ	խ x, գ g, ք kʿ
*b	պ p	
*d	տ t	րկ rk (PIE *dw → Arm. րկ rk)
*ǵ	ծ c	
*g, *gʷ	կ k	ծ c
*bʰ	բ b	ւ w (between vowels)
*dʰ	դ d	ջ ǰ (PIE *dʰy → Arm. ջ ǰ)
*ǵʰ	ձ j	զ z
*gʰ	գ g	ջ ǰ
*gʷʰ	գ g	ջ ǰ; ժ ž

PIE resonants and fricatives in Armenian
PIE	Armenian	Special developments
*m	մ m	ն n (word-finally) ∅ (before *s)
*n	ն n	∅ (before *s)
*l	լ l, ղ ł	ղ ł (adjacent to consonants and word-finally)
*r	ր r	
*w	գ g	վ v, ւ w
*y	ջ ǰ	∅ (between vowels)
*s	հ h	ս s (after consonant or before obstruent); ∅; ք kʿ (word-finally, also PIE *sw → Arm. ք kʿ)
*h₁	∅	է ē (initially)
*h₂, *h₃	հ h	ա a (initially); ∅

PIE vowels in Armenian
PIE	Armenian	Special developments
*a	ա a	
*e	է ē	ա a (adjacent to *h₂); ի i (before h₁ or nasals); օ ō (after *h₃); ու u (before *h₃)
*i	ի i	
*o	օ ō	
*u	ու u	

== History ==
The origin of the Proto-Armenian language is subject to scholarly debate. The Armenian hypothesis would postulate the Armenian language as an in situ development of a 3rd millennium BC Proto-Indo-European language, while the Kurgan hypothesis suggests it arrived in the Armenian Highlands either from the Balkans or through the Caucasus. The arrival of such a population who spoke Proto-Armenian in the Armenian Highlands is assumed to have occurred sometime during the Bronze Age or at the latest, during the Bronze Age Collapse around 1200 BC, according to this theory.

One of the theories about the emergence of Armenian in the region is that Paleo-Balkan-speaking settlers related to Phrygians (the Mushki or the retroactively named Armeno-Phrygians), who had already settled in the western parts of the region before the Kingdom of Van was established in Urartu, had become the ruling elite under the Median Empire, followed by the Achaemenid Empire. The existence of Urartian words in the Armenian language and Armenian loanwords into Urartian suggests early contact between the two languages and long periods of bilingualism.

According to the Encyclopedia of Indo-European Culture:

The Armenians according to Diakonoff, are then an amalgam of the Hurrian (and Urartians), Luvians [Luwians] and the Proto-Armenian Mushki who carried their IE [Indo-European] language eastwards across Anatolia. After arriving in its historical territory, Proto-Armenian would appear to have undergone massive influence by the languages it eventually replaced. Armenian phonology, for instance, appears to have been greatly affected by Urartian, which may suggest a long period of bilingualism.

Findings in Armenian genetics from 2019 reveal heavy mixing of groups from the 3000s BC until the Bronze Age Collapse. Admixture signals seem to have decreased to insignificant levels after c. 1200 BC, after which Armenian DNA remained stable, which appears to have been caused by Armenians' isolation from their surroundings, and subsequently sustained by the cultural, linguistic and religious distinctiveness that persists until today. The connection between the Mushki and Armenians is unclear as nothing is known of the Mushki language. Most modern scholars have rejected a direct linguistic relationship with Proto-Armenian if the Mushki were Thracians or Phrygians. Additionally, recent findings in genetic research does not support significant admixture into the Armenian nation after 1200 BC, making the Mushki, if they indeed migrated from a Balkan or western Anatolian homeland during or after the Bronze Age Collapse, unlikely candidates for the Proto-Armenians.

However, as others have placed (at least the Eastern) Mushki homeland in the Armenian Highlands and South Caucasus region, it is possible that at least some of the Mushki were Armenian-speakers or speakers of a closely related language. Some modern studies show that Armenian is as close to Indo-Iranian as it is to Greek and Phrygian.

An alternate theory suggests that speakers of Proto-Armenian were tribes indigenous to the northern Armenian highlands, such as the Hayasans, Diauehi or Etiuni. Although these groups are only known from references left by neighboring peoples (such as Hittites, Urartians, and Assyrians), Armenian etymologies have been proposed for their names. While the Urartian language was used by the royal elite, the population they ruled was likely multi-lingual, and some of these peoples would have spoken Armenian. This can be reconciled with the Phrygian/Mushki theory if those groups originally came from the Caucasus region or Armenian Highlands.

Recent genetic research has found Proto-Indo-European-speaking tribes migrated from north to south across the Caucasus during the third millennium BCE; it is speculated that their dialect may have been Proto-Armenian. They can perhaps be linked to the Trialeti–Vanadzor culture.

This new research has also suggested that Armenian, along with Greek and Albanian, are connected to the Yamnaya culture of the Pontic–Caspian steppe and Caucasus, whereas all other existent branches of Indo-European were mediated through the Corded Ware culture.

== See also ==
- Armenian hypothesis
- Graeco-Armenian
- Armeno-Aryan
- Armeno-Phrygian languages
- Origin of the Armenians
- Name of Armenia

== Sources ==
- Adjarian, Hrachia. Etymological root dictionary of the Armenian language, vol. I–IV. Yerevan State University, Yerevan, 1971 – 1979.
- Austin, William M. (January 1942). "Is Armenian an Anatolian Language?". Language. 18 (1): 22–25. doi:10.2307/409074. JSTOR 409074.
- Barton, Charles R. (October 1963). "The Etymology of Armenian ert'am". Language. 39 (4): 620. doi:10.2307/411956. JSTOR 411956.
- Bonfante, G. (June 1942). "The Armenian Aorist". Journal of the American Oriental Society. 62 (2): 102–105. doi:10.2307/594462. JSTOR 594462.
- Diakonoff, Igor (1992). "First evidence of the Proto-Armenian language in Eastern Anatolia". Annual of Armenian Linguistics. 13: 51–54.
- Diakonoff, I. M. (October 1985). "Hurro-Urartian Borrowings in Old Armenian". Journal of the American Oriental Society. 105 (4): 597–603. doi:10.2307/602722. JSTOR 602722. S2CID 163807245.
- Greppin, John A. C.; Diakonoff, I. M. (October 1991). "Some Effects of the Hurro-Urartian People and Their Languages upon the Earliest Armenians". Journal of the American Oriental Society. 111 (4): 720. doi:10.2307/603403. JSTOR 603403.
- Meillet, Antoine (1903). Esquisse d'une grammaire comparée de l'arménien classique. Impr. des PP. mékhitharistes.
- Minshall, Robert (October 1955). "'Initial' Indo-European */y/ in Armenian". Language. 31 (4): 499–503. doi:10.2307/411362. JSTOR 411362.
- Kerns, J. Alexander; Schwartz, Benjamin I. (July 1942). "On the Placing of Armenian". Language. 18 (3): 226–228. doi:10.2307/409558. JSTOR 409558.
- K. H. Schmidt, The Indo-European Basis of Proto-Armenian : Principles of Reconstruction, Annual of Armenian linguistics, Cleveland State University, 11, 33-47, 1990.
- Werner Winter, Problems of Armenian Phonology I, Language 30, No. 2 (Apr., 1954), pp. 197–201
- Werner Winter, Problems of Armenian Phonology II, Language 31, No. 1 (Jan., 1955), pp. 4–8
- Werner Winter Problems of Armenian Phonology III, Language 38, No. 3, Part 1 (Jul., 1962), pp. 254–262
