= Armani (kingdom) =

Ancient kingdom mentioned by Sargon of Akkad

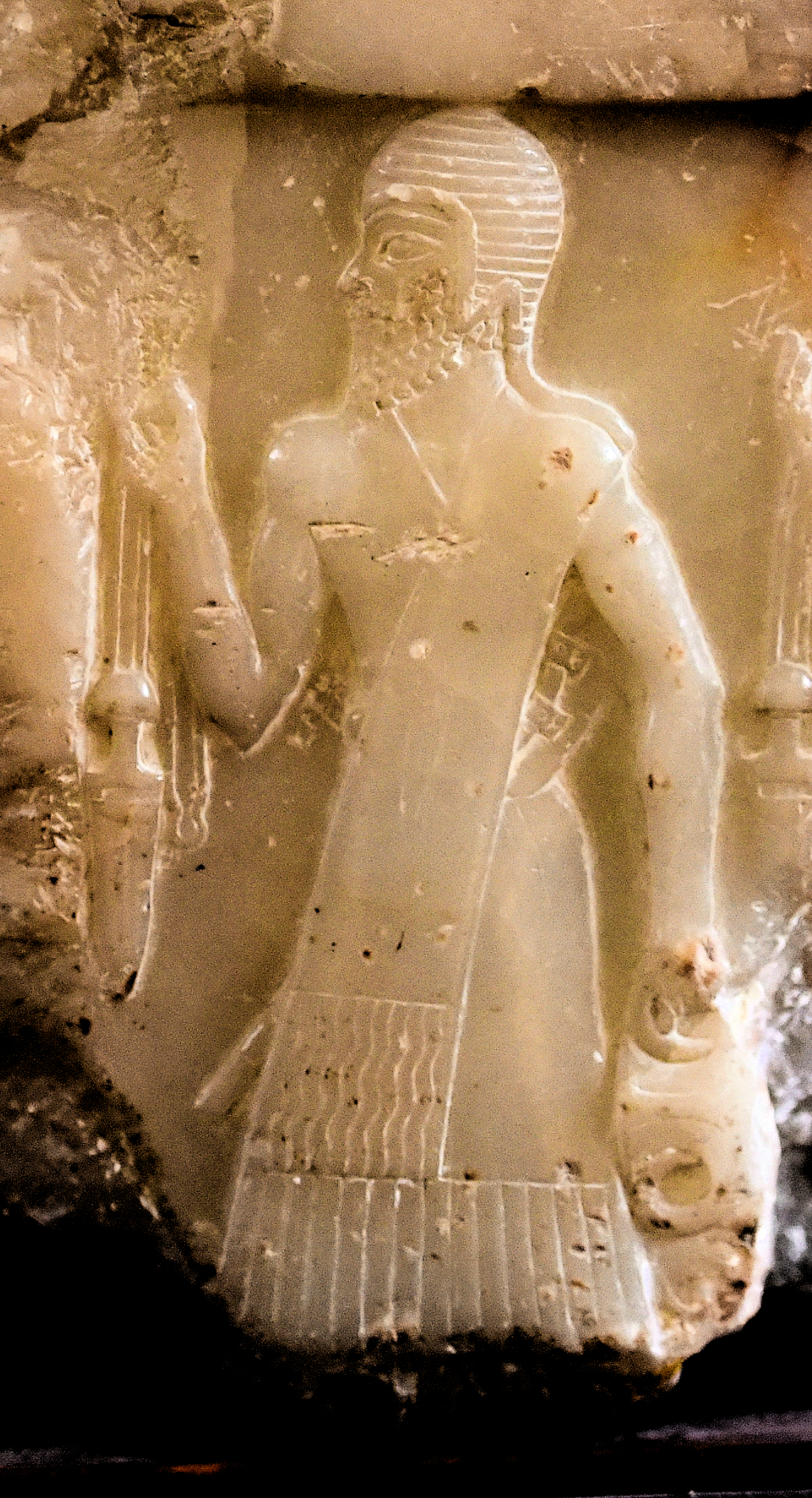
Akkadian soldier of Naram-Sin, with helmet and long sword, on the Nasiriyah stele. He carries a metal vessel of Anatolian type.

Armani was an ancient kingdom mentioned by Sargon of Akkad.

== Location ==
The location of Armi was unknown. Some have identified it with the Syrian kingdom of Armi. Others disagree, and instead place it north of the Hamrin Mountains in northern Iraq.

== History ==
When the God Dagon determined the verdict to Naram-Sin, the mighty God delivered into his hands Rid-Adad, king of Armanum and Naram-Sin personally captured him in the middle of his palace gateway.

— Naram-Sin describing his capture of the king of Armanum.

First mentioned as the land of Armani by Sargon. During the Middle Assyrian and Kassite periods, the land of Armani was mentioned as located east of the Tigris. King Shalmaneser III mentions his conquest of Halman, but the identification of Halman with Akkadian Armani (Arman) is dubious according to J.A. Brinkmann.
