= List of ancient Armeno-Phrygian peoples and tribes =

This is a list of the hypothetical Armeno-Phrygian peoples and tribes. Armeno-Phrygians is the name given to the hypothetical common ancestors of both Phrygians and Armenians.

Even if Armenians are not more closely related to the Phrygians, some scholars think that there is some closer connection from common ancestors between Greeks, Phrygians and Armenians and their languages that between them and other Indo-European peoples (as the model tree of Donald Ringe and Tandy Warnow).

Regardless of their Ethnogenesis, Armenians (հայեր - Hayer or Հայք - Hayq or Hayk - Հայկ - self name in their own language) are one of the oldest ethnic groups that live until modern times, they live or lived in the Armenian Highlands and eastern Asia Minor or Anatolia, in the historical regions of Armenia, and today's Armenia for about or more than three millennia, by this standard they are clearly a native people of their land. Like many other, or even most, ethnic groups, Armenian ethnogenensis and origin was the result of a complex process and blend between older and later peoples that formed a new ethnic identity.

== Ancestors ==
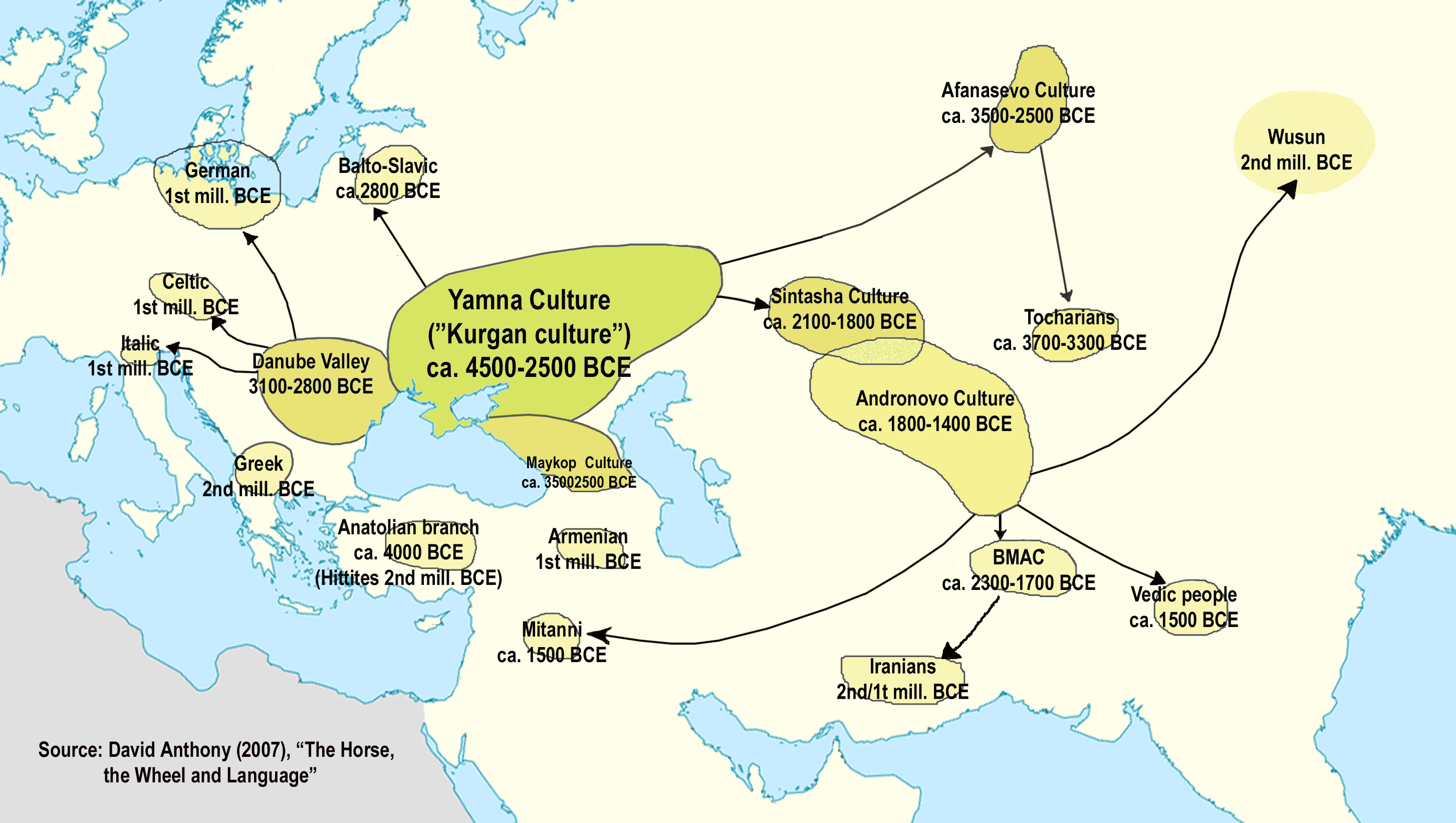
Map 1: Indo-European migrations as described in The Horse, the Wheel, and Language by David W. Anthony

- Proto-Indo-Europeans (Proto-Indo-European speakers)
  - Proto-Graeco-Phrygians (Proto-Graeco-Phrygian speakers)
    - Proto-Graeco-Armenians (Proto-Graeco-Armenian speakers)

== Possible Direct Ancestors ==
- Graeco-Phrygians
  - Hellenics
    - Proto-Greeks
      - Ancient Greeks (esp. speakers of northern dialects)
  - (?) Paeonians / Paeones There are different views and still no agreement among scholars about the Paeonians' ethnic and linguistic kinship. Some such as Wilhelm Tomaschek and Paul Kretschmer claim that the language spoken by the Paeonians belonged to the Illyrian family, while Dimitar Dechev claims affinities with Thracian. Irwin L. Merker considers that the language spoken by the Paeonians was closely related to Greek (and ancient Macedonian if it was a distinct language from ancient Greek), a Hellenic language with "a great deal of Illyrian and Thracian influence as a result of this proximity".
    - Agrianes (also, Agriani and Agrii) (it is also claimed that this tribe was Thracian)
    - Almopians (also Almopioi)
    - Derrones (also Derroni) (it is also claimed that this tribe was Thracian)
    - Doberes
    - Laeaeans (also Laeaei and Laiai)
    - Odomantes (also Odomanti) (it is also claimed that this tribe was Thracian)
    - Paeoplae
    - Siropaiones
  - (?) Phrygians (Armeno-Phrygians? Part of the larger and older Graeco-Phrygians?)

== Possible Armeno-Phrygians ==
Map 3: Historical Armenia, 150 BC

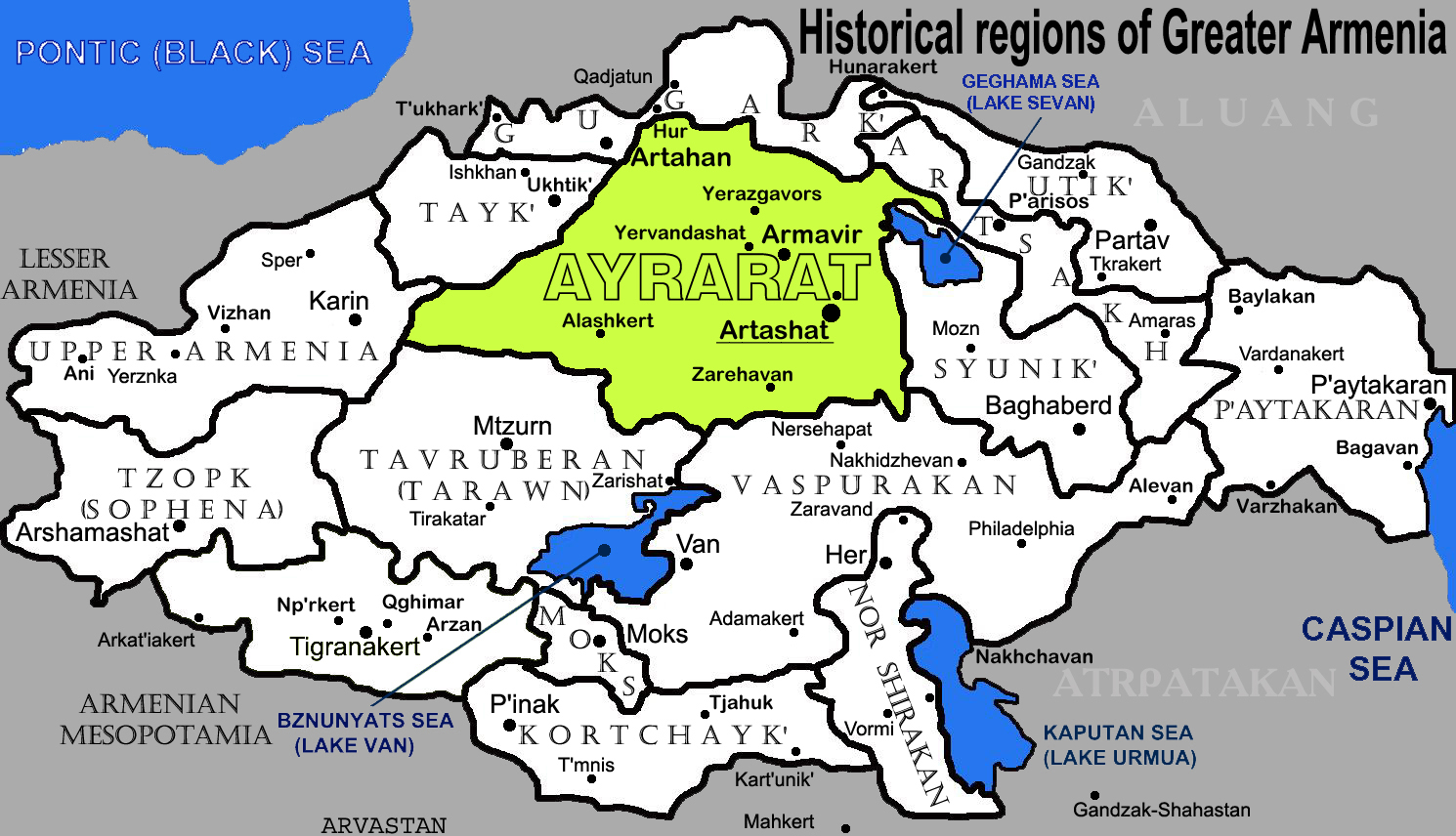
Map 4: The location of Ayrarat in Greater Armenia, a core Province in Ancient Armenia.

May have been part of the older and larger Graeco-Phrygians.

- Armeno-Phrygians (Bryges-Phryges-Mushki) (Armeno-Phrygian speakers)
  - Bryges (Bryges, Mygdones and Pieres) (Haemus Mons or Balkan Phrygians)
    - Bryges Proper
    - Mygdones (in Mygdonia)
    - Pieres (originally in Pieria, later in Pieris)
  - (?) Mushki (Mysians, Phrygians and Proto-Armenians) (Asia Minor Phrygians) (they may have entered Asia Minor in the Bronze Age collapse and also migrated eastward to Eastern Anatolia (Eastern Asia Minor); Eastern Mushki may have been identical with Phrygians or related to them and they possibly blended with local populations and formed Proto-Armenians). Other scholars, such as Aram Kossian have a different view and consider a native origin for the Eastern Mushki.
    - (?) Western Mushki (Mysians and Phrygians)
      - Mysians (Mushki) (Coastal Phrygians) (they lived in Mysia)
      - Phrygians (Inland Phrygians) (they lived in Phrygia)
    - (?) Eastern Mushki (Moschoi / Moscheni / Meshech) (Proto-Armenians?)
      - (?) Meskhi (a Mushki tribe that lived in Moschia or Meskheti, assimilated by the Proto-Kartvelians?)
      - (?) Proto-Armenians (possibly descendants of an eastward Mushki according to some scholars, or from an early native origin, Eastern Mushki may have been a people of different origin from the Western Mushki, according to other scholars).

== Criticism ==
A number of linguists have rejected a close relationship between Armenian and Phrygian, despite saying that the two languages do share some features. Phrygian is now classified as a centum language more closely related to Greek than Armenian, whereas Armenian is mostly satem.

Recent research suggests that there is lack of archaeological and genetic evidence for a group from the Balkans entering eastern Asia Minor or the Armenian Highlands during or after the Bronze Age Collapse (as was suggested by Diakonoff).

== See also ==
- Armeno-Phrygians
- Origin of the Armenians
- Armenians
- Armenian language
- Armeno-Phrygian languages
- Armenian hypothesis
- Bronze Age collapse
- Urartu
- History of Armenia
- Ancient Armenia
- List of regions of ancient Armenia
