= Armeno-Phrygian languages =

Hypothetical branch of Indo-European

Armeno-Phrygian
- (proposed)
- Geographic distribution: Caucasus, Anatolia
- Ethnicity: Armeno-Phrygians
- Linguistic classification: Indo-European: Armeno-Phrygian
- Proto-language: Proto-Armeno-Phrygian
- Subdivisions: Armenian; Phrygian †

Language codes

The name Armeno-Phrygian is used for a hypothetical language branch, which would include the languages spoken by the Phrygians and the Armenians, and would be a branch of the Indo-European language family, or a sub-branch of either the proposed "Graeco-Armeno-Aryan" or "Armeno-Aryan" branches. According to this hypothesis, Proto-Armenian was a language descendant from a common ancestor with Phrygian and was closely related to it. Proto-Armenian differentiated from Phrygian by language evolution over time but also by the Hurro-Urartian language substrate influence. Classification is difficult because little is known of Phrygian, but Proto-Armenian arguably forms a subgroup with Greek and Indo-Iranian.

There are two conflicting accounts of the origin and presence of the Armenian language in the lands that were Ancient Armenia:

- Ancient Greek historian Herodotus stated that Armenians were colonists from Phrygia ("the Armenians were equipped like Phrygians, being Phrygian colonists" (Ἀρμένιοι δὲ κατά περ Φρύγες ἐσεσάχατο, ἐόντες Φρυγῶν ἄποικοι)(7.73). Phrygia encompassed much of western and central Anatolia during the Iron Age. According to Ancient Greeks, the Phrygians had originated in the Balkans as Bryges. This led some scholars to suggest that Armenians also originated in the Balkans. According to Igor Diakonoff, the Phrygians and the Proto-Armenians migrated eastward during the Bronze Age collapse (at the end of the 13th century and the first half of 12th century). This theory suggests that Proto-Armenians were known by the name of Mushki to the Assyrians and that they blended with local ancient populations, including speakers of Hurro-Urartian languages, to create Armenians.
- Some modern scholars instead believe that a proto-Armeno-Phrygian population, and their respective language, originated in eastern Anatolia and/or the Armenian Highlands, from where the Phrygians later migrated westward.

According to some scholars, there is evidence of language borrowings (Armenisms) from the Proto-Armenian language into Hittite and Urartian.

== Mushki ==
The Mushki language, specifically "Eastern Mushki", is sometimes considered closely related to Armenian. According to Igor M. Diakonoff, the Mushki were a Phrygian-related group who used a language related to Proto-Armenian.

== Criticism ==
A number of linguists have rejected a close relationship between Armenian and Phrygian, despite saying that the two languages do share some features. Phrygian is now classified as a centum language more closely related to Greek than Armenian, whereas Armenian is mostly satem.

Recent research suggests that there is lack of archaeological and genetic evidence for a group from the Balkans entering eastern Asia Minor or the Armenian Highlands during or after the Bronze Age Collapse (as was suggested by Diakonoff).

== See also ==
- Greco-Armenian
- Graeco-Phrygian
- Paleo-Balkan languages
- Armeno-Phrygians
- Armenian hypothesis
- Urartu
- Mushki
