= Ancient Near East =

Home of many cradles of civilization

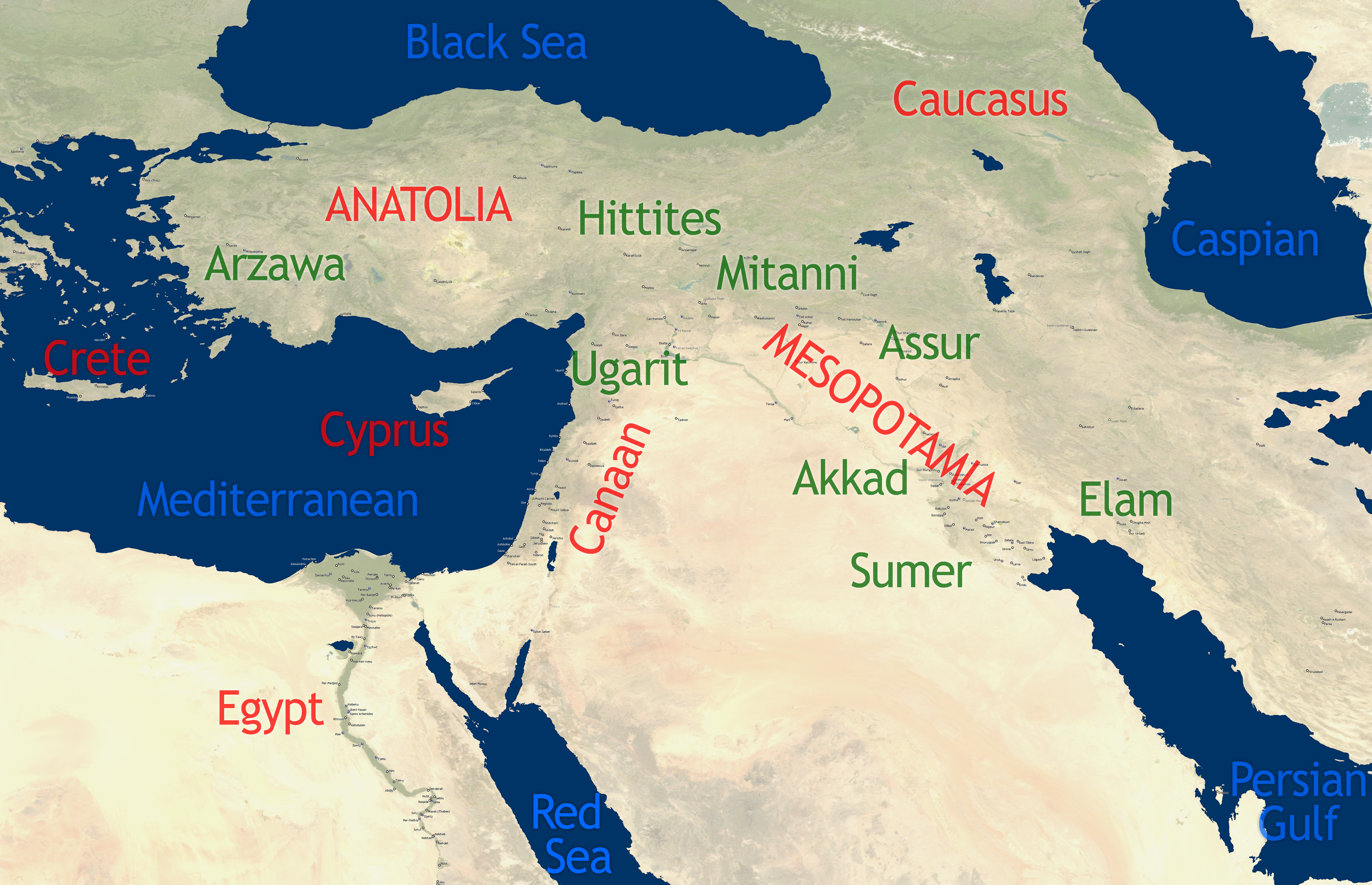
Overview map of the ancient Near East

The ancient Near East was home to many cradles of civilization, spanning Ancient Mesopotamia, (Note: Modern-day Iraq and northeastern Syria, as well as parts of southeastern Turkey and southwestern Iran.) the ancient Levant, (Note: Modern-day Syria, Lebanon, Palestine, Jordan, Israel, and Cyprus.) ancient Egypt, ancient Elam, ancient Anatolia or Asia Minor, the ancient South Caucasus and Armenian highlands, (Note: All of modern-day Armenia, in addition to the Turkish Eastern Anatolia Region, northwestern Iran, southern Georgia, and western Azerbaijan.) and ancient Northern Arabia (including Dilmun). (Note: Modern-day southern Iraq, southeastern Jordan, Kuwait, and Bahrain.) It is generally not considered to include Pre-Islamic Arabia as a whole, the ancient Berbers, or ancient Nubia, though it is sometimes classified as encompassing ancient Iran (Note: Media, Parthia, and Persis), ancient Cyprus, and the Aegean civilization (Note: The Minoan, Mycenaean, and Cycladic cultures). Given the nature and scope of their subject matter, the fields of ancient Near East studies and Near Eastern archaeology, including the subfields of Assyriology and Egyptology, are among the most prominent with regard to research in the realm of ancient history, alongside such disciplines as Classics, Classical archaeology, biblical studies, biblical archaeology, Jewish studies, Christian studies, Iranology, Sinology, and Indology, some of which overlap with them. Historically, the Near East denoted an area roughly encompassing central West Asia and Egypt, having been focused on the lands between Greece in the west, Iran in the east, the Caucasus in the north, and Arabia in the south. It therefore largely corresponds with the central core area of the modern-day geopolitical concept of the Middle East. It was strongly influential on the later Islamic and Western civilizations.

The history of the ancient Near East begins with the rise of Sumer in the 4th millennium BC, though the date that it ends is a subject of debate among scholars; the term covers the region's developments in the Bronze Age and the Iron Age, and is variously considered to end with either the establishment of the Achaemenid Empire in the 6th century BC, the establishment of the Macedonian Empire in the 4th century BC, or the beginning of the early Muslim conquests in the 7th century AD.

It was within the ancient Near East that humans first practiced intensive year-round agriculture, which led to the rise of the earliest dense urban settlements and the development of many now-familiar institutions of civilization, such as social stratification, centralized government and empires, and organized religion (see: ancient Near Eastern religions) and organized warfare. It also saw the creation of the first writing system, the first alphabet (i.e., abjad), the first currency, and the first legal codes, all of which were monumental advances that laid the foundations of astronomy and mathematics, and the invention of the wheel.

During this period, the region's previously stateless societies largely transitioned to building states, many of which gradually came to annex the territories of their neighbouring civilizations. This process continued until the entire ancient Near East was enveloped by militaristic empires that had emerged from their own lands to conquer and absorb a variety of cultures under the rule of a top-level government.

== The concept of the Near East ==
The phrase "ancient Near East" denotes the 19th-century distinction between the Near and Far East as global regions of interest to the British Empire. The distinction began during the Crimean War. The last major exclusive partition of the east between these two terms was current in diplomacy in the late 19th century, with the Hamidian massacres of the Armenians and Assyrians by the Ottoman Empire in 1894–1896 and the First Sino-Japanese War of 1894–1895. The two theatres were described by the statesmen and advisors of the British Empire as "the Near East" and "the Far East". Shortly after, they were to share the stage with ''Middle East'', a term that came to prevail in the 20th century and continues in modern times.

As Near East had meant the lands of the Ottoman Empire at roughly its maximum extent, on the fall of that empire, the use of Near East in diplomacy was reduced significantly in favor of the Middle East. Meanwhile, the ancient Near East had become distinct. The Ottoman rule over the Near East ranged from Vienna (to the north) to the tip of the Arabian Peninsula (to the south), from Egypt (in the west) to the borders of Iraq (in the east). The 19th-century archaeologists added Iran to their definition, which was never under the Ottomans, but they excluded all of Europe and, generally, Egypt, which had parts in the empire.

== Periodization ==
Ancient Near East periodization is the attempt to categorize or divide time into discrete named blocks, or eras, of the Near East. The result is a descriptive abstraction that provides a useful handle on Near East periods of time with relatively stable characteristics.

Copper Age	Chalcolithic (5000–3300 BC)	Early Chalcolithic	5000–4500 BC	Ubaid period in Mesopotamia
Copper Age	Chalcolithic (5000–3300 BC)	Late Chalcolithic	4500–3300 BC	Uruk period of Sumer, Predynastic Period of ancient Egypt, Proto-Elamite period in Iran, Ghassulian, Gerzeh
Bronze Age	Early Bronze Age (3300–2100 BC)	Early Bronze Age I	3300–3000 BC	Jemdet Nasr period in Mesopotamia, Protodynastic to Early Dynastic Period of Egypt, settlement of Phoenicians
Bronze Age	Early Bronze Age (3300–2100 BC)	Early Bronze Age II	3000–2700 BC	Early Dynastic Period of Mesopotamia
Bronze Age	Early Bronze Age (3300–2100 BC)	Early Bronze Age III	2700–2200 BC	Old Kingdom of Egypt, Akkadian Empire, early Assyria, Old Elamite period, Sumero-Akkadian states, Marhasi Jiroft
Bronze Age	Early Bronze Age (3300–2100 BC)	Early Bronze Age IV	2200–2100 BC	Second half of the Sixth Dynasty of Egypt, First Intermediate Period of Egypt
Bronze Age	Middle Bronze Age (2100–1550 BC)	Middle Bronze Age I	2100–2000 BC	Third Dynasty of Ur
Bronze Age	Middle Bronze Age (2100–1550 BC)	Middle Bronze Age II A	2000–1750 BC	Minoan civilization, early Babylonia, Egyptian Middle Kingdom
Bronze Age	Middle Bronze Age (2100–1550 BC)	Middle Bronze Age II B	1750–1650 BC	Second Intermediate Period of Egypt
Bronze Age	Middle Bronze Age (2100–1550 BC)	Middle Bronze Age II C	1650–1550 BC	Hittite Old Kingdom, Minoan eruption
Bronze Age	Late Bronze Age (1550–1200 BC)	Late Bronze Age I	1550–1400 BC	Hittite Middle Kingdom, Hayasa-Azzi, Middle Elamite period, New Kingdom of Egypt
Bronze Age	Late Bronze Age (1550–1200 BC)	Late Bronze Age II A	1400–1300 BC	Hittite New Kingdom, Mitanni, Hayasa-Azzi, Ugarit, Mycenaean Greece
Bronze Age	Late Bronze Age (1550–1200 BC)	Late Bronze Age II B	1300–1200 BC	Middle Assyrian Empire, beginning of the high point of Phoenicians
Iron Age	Iron Age I (1200–1000 BC)	Iron Age I A	1200–1150 BC	Troy VII, Hekla 3 eruption, Bronze Age collapse, Sea Peoples
Iron Age	Iron Age I (1200–1000 BC)	Iron Age I B	1150–1000 BC	Neo-Hittite states, Neo Elamite period, Aramean states
Iron Age	Iron Age II (1000–539 BC)	Iron Age II A	1000–900 BC	Greek Dark Ages, traditional date of the United Monarchy of Israel
Iron Age	Iron Age II (1000–539 BC)	Iron Age II B	900–700 BC	Kingdom of Israel, Urartu, Phrygia, Neo-Assyrian Empire, Kingdom of Judah, first settlement of Carthage
Iron Age	Iron Age II (1000–539 BC)	Iron Age II C	700–539 BC	Neo-Babylonian Empire, Median Empire, fall of the Neo-Assyrian Empire, Phoenicia, Archaic Greece, rise of Achaemenid Persia
Classical antiquity		Achaemenid	539–330 BC	Persian Achaemenid Empire, Classical Greece
Classical antiquity		Hellenistic & Parthian	330–31 BC	Macedonian Empire, Seleucid Empire, Kingdom of Armenia, Kingdom of Pergamon, Ptolemaic Kingdom, Parthian Empire
Classical antiquity		Roman & Persian	31 BC – 634 AD	Roman–Persian Wars, Roman Empire, Parthian Empire, Kingdom of Armenia, Sassanid Empire, Byzantine Empire, Muslim conquests

== Background: prehistory ==
- Paleolithic
- Epipalaeolithic Near East
  - Kebaran culture
  - Natufian culture
- Neolithic in the Near East
  - Pre-pottery Neolithic A
  - Pre-pottery Neolithic B
  - Pre-pottery Neolithic C
  - Pottery Neolithic

=== Chalcolithic ===
==== Early Mesopotamia ====
The Uruk period (c. 4000 to 3100 BC) existed from the protohistoric Chalcolithic to the early Bronze Age period in the history of Mesopotamia, following the Ubaid period. Named after the Sumerian city of Uruk, this period saw the emergence of urban life in Mesopotamia. It was followed by the Sumerian civilization in southern Mesopotamia. The late Uruk period (3400 to 3200 BC) saw the gradual emergence of cuneiform script and corresponds to the early Bronze Age.

== History ==
=== Bronze Age ===
==== Early Bronze Age ====
===== Sumer and Akkad =====
Relief of early war wagons on the Standard of Ur, c. 2500 BC

Sumer hosted many early advances in human history, such as schools (c. 3000 BC), making the area a cradle of civilization. The oldest excavated archaeological site in Sumer, Tell el-'Oueili, dates to the 7th millennium BC, although it is likely that the area was occupied even earlier. The oldest layers at 'Oueili mark the beginning of the Ubaid period, which was followed by the Uruk period (4th millennium BC) and the Early Dynastic periods (3rd millennium BC). The Akkadian Empire, founded by Sargon the Great, lasted from the 24th to the 21st century BC, and was regarded by many as the world's first empire. The Akkadians eventually fragmented into Assyria and Babylonia.

===== Elam =====
Ancient Elam lay to the east of Sumer and Akkad, in the far west and southwest of modern-day Iran, stretching from the lowlands of Khuzestan and Ilam Province. In the Old Elamite period, c. 3200 BC, it consisted of kingdoms on the Iranian plateau, centered on Anshan, and from the mid-2nd millennium BC, it was centered on Susa in the Khuzestan lowlands. Elam was absorbed into the Assyrian Empire in the 9th to 7th centuries BC; however, the civilization endured up until 539 BC when it was finally overrun by the Iranian Persians. The Proto-Elamite civilization existed from c. 3200 BC to 2700 BC, when Susa, the later capital of the Elamites, began to receive influence from the cultures of the Iranian plateau. In archaeological terms, this corresponds to the late Banesh period. This civilization is recognized as the oldest in Iran and was largely contemporary with its neighbour, Sumer. The Proto-Elamite script is an early Bronze Age writing system briefly in use for the ancient Elamite language (which was a language isolate) before the introduction of Elamite cuneiform.

===== The Amorites =====
The Amorites were a nomadic Semitic people who occupied the country west of the Euphrates from the second half of the 3rd millennium BC. In the earliest Sumerian sources, beginning about 2400 BC, the land of the Amorites ("the Mar.tu land") is associated with the West, including Syria and Canaan, although their ultimate origin may have been Arabia. They ultimately settled in Mesopotamia, ruling Isin, Larsa, and later Babylon.

==== Middle Bronze Age ====
- Assyria, after enduring a short period of Mitanni domination, emerged as a great power from the accession of Ashur-uballit I in 1365 BC to the death of Tiglath-Pileser I in 1076 BC. Assyria rivaled Egypt during this period, and dominated much of the near east.
- Babylonia, founded as a state by Amorite tribes, found itself under the rule of Kassites for 435 years. The nation stagnated during the Kassite period, and Babylonia often found itself under Assyrian or Elamite domination.
- Canaan: Ugarit, Kadesh, Megiddo.
- The Hittite Empire was founded some time after 2000 BC, and existed as a major power, dominating Asia Minor and the Levant until 1200 BC, when it was first overrun by the Phrygians, and then appropriated by Assyria.

==== Late Bronze Age ====
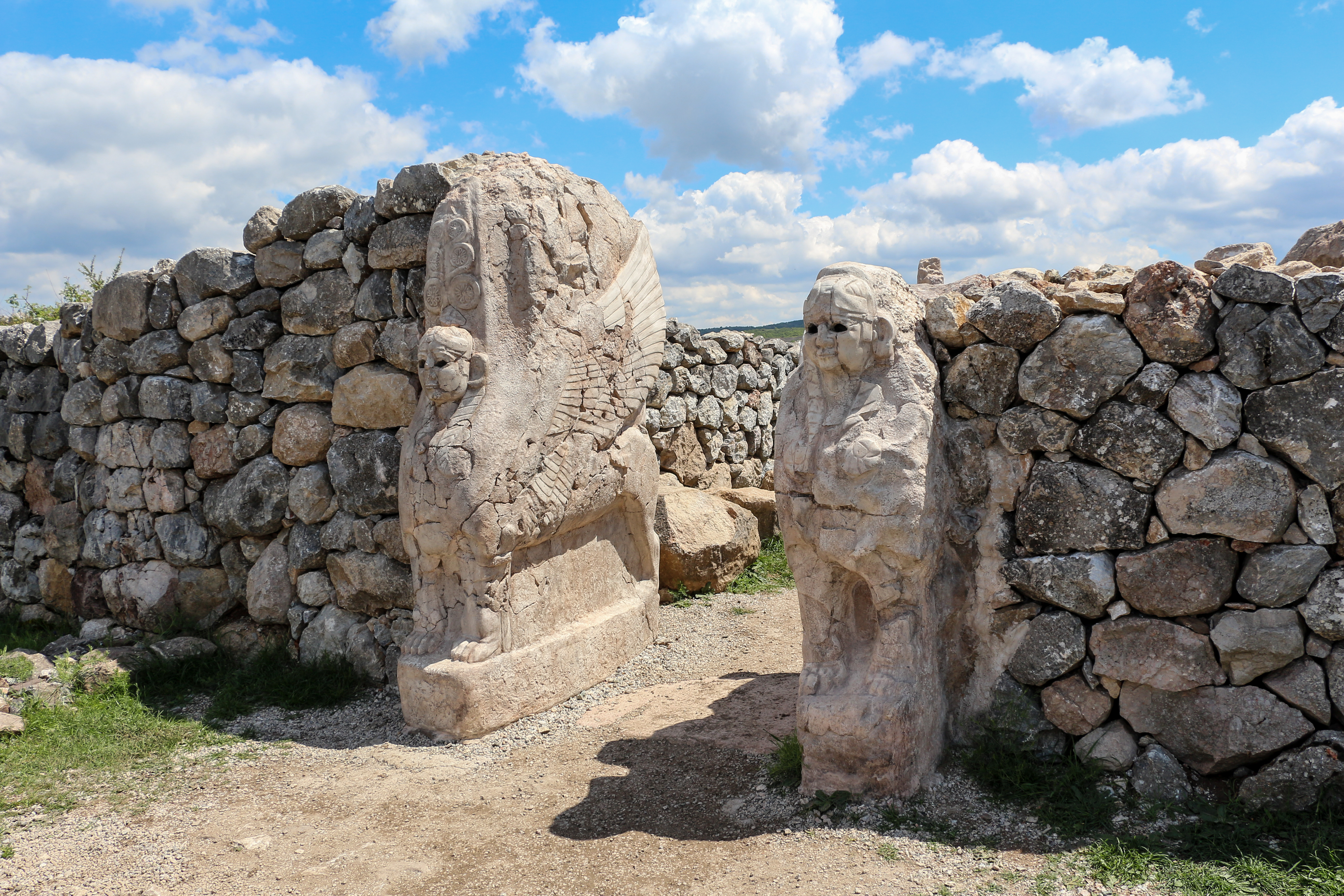
Sphinx Gate entrance of the Hittite city of Hattusa

The Hurrians lived in northern Mesopotamia and areas to the immediate east and west, beginning approximately 2500 BC. They probably originated in the Caucasus and entered from the north, but this is not certain. Their known homeland was centred on Subartu, the Khabur River valley, and later they established themselves as rulers of small kingdoms throughout northern Mesopotamia and Syria. The largest and most influential Hurrian nation was the kingdom of Mitanni. The Hurrians played a substantial part in the history of the Hittites.

Ishuwa was an ancient kingdom in Anatolia. The name is first attested in the second millennium BC, and is also spelled Išuwa. In the classical period, the land was a part of Ancient Armenia. Ishuwa was one of the places where agriculture developed very early on in the Neolithic. Urban centres emerged in the upper Euphrates river valley around 3500 BC. The first states followed in the third millennium BC. The name Ishuwa is not known until the literate period of the second millennium BC. Few literate sources from within Ishuwa have been discovered and the primary source material comes from Hittite texts. To the west of Ishuwa lay the kingdom of the Hittites, and this nation was an untrustworthy neighbour. The Hittite king Hattusili I (c. 1600 BC) is reported to have marched his army across the Euphrates river and destroyed the cities there. This corresponds well with burnt destruction layers discovered by archaeologists at town sites in Ishuwa of roughly the same date. After the end of the Hittite empire in the early 12th century BC a new state emerged in Ishuwa. The city of Malatya became the centre of one of the so-called Neo-Hittite kingdom. The movement of nomadic people may have weakened the kingdom of Malatya before the final Assyrian invasion. The decline of the settlements and culture in Ishuwa from the 7th century BC until the Roman period was probably caused by this movement of people. The Armenians later settled in the area since they were natives of the Armenian plateau and related to the earlier inhabitants of Ishuwa.

Kizzuwatna was a kingdom of the second millennium BC, situated in the highlands of southeastern Anatolia, near the Gulf of İskenderun in modern-day Turkey, encircling the Taurus Mountains and the Ceyhan river. The centre of the kingdom was the city of Kummanni, situated in the highlands. In a later era, the same region was known as Cilicia.

Empires in the ancient Near East around the end of the 2nd millennium BC

Luwian is an extinct language of the Anatolian branch of the Indo-European language family. Luwian speakers gradually spread through Anatolia and became a contributing factor to the downfall, after c. 1180 BC, of the Hittite Empire, where it was already widely spoken. Luwian was also the language spoken in the Neo-Hittite states of Syria, such as Melid and Carchemish, as well as in the central Anatolian kingdom of Tabal that flourished around 900 BC. Luwian has been preserved in two forms, named after the writing systems used to represent them: Cuneiform Luwian and Hieroglyphic Luwian.

Mari was an ancient Sumerian and Amorite city, located 11 kilometres north-west of the modern town of Abu Kamal on the western bank of Euphrates river, some 120 km southeast of Deir ez-Zor, Syria. It is thought to have been inhabited since the 5th millennium BC, although it flourished from 2900 BC until 1759 BC, when it was sacked by Hammurabi.

Mitanni was a Hurrian kingdom in northern Mesopotamia from c. 1600 BC, at the height of its power, during the 14th century BC, encompassing what is today southeastern Turkey, northern Syria and northern Iraq (roughly corresponding to Kurdistan), centred on the capital Washukanni whose precise location has not yet been determined by archaeologists. The Mitanni language showed Indo-Aryan influences, especially in the names of gods. The spread to Syria of a distinct pottery type associated with the Kura-Araxes culture has been connected with this movement, although its date is somewhat too early. Yamhad was an ancient Amorite kingdom. A substantial Hurrian population also settled in the kingdom, and the Hurrian culture influenced the area. The kingdom was powerful during the Middle Bronze Age, c. 1800–1600 BC. Its biggest rival was Qatna further south. Yamhad was finally destroyed by the Hittites in the 16th century BC.

The Aramaeans were a Semitic (West Semitic language group), semi-nomadic and pastoralist people who had lived in upper Mesopotamia and Syria. Aramaeans have never had a unified empire; they were divided into independent kingdoms all across the Near East. Yet to these Aramaeans befell the privilege of imposing their language and culture upon the entire Near East and beyond, fostered in part by the mass relocations enacted by successive empires, including the Assyrians and Babylonians. Scholars even have used the term 'Aramaization' for the Assyro-Babylonian peoples' languages and cultures, that have become Aramaic-speaking.

The Sea peoples is the term used for a confederacy of seafaring raiders of the second millennium BC who sailed into the eastern shores of the Mediterranean, caused political unrest, and attempted to enter or control Egyptian territory during the late 19th dynasty, and especially during Year 8 of Ramesses III of the 20th Dynasty. The Egyptian pharaoh Merneptah explicitly refers to them by the term "the foreign-countries (or 'peoples') of the sea" in his Great Karnak Inscription. Although some scholars believe that they "invaded" Cyprus, Hatti and the Levant, this hypothesis is disputed.

===== Bronze Age collapse =====
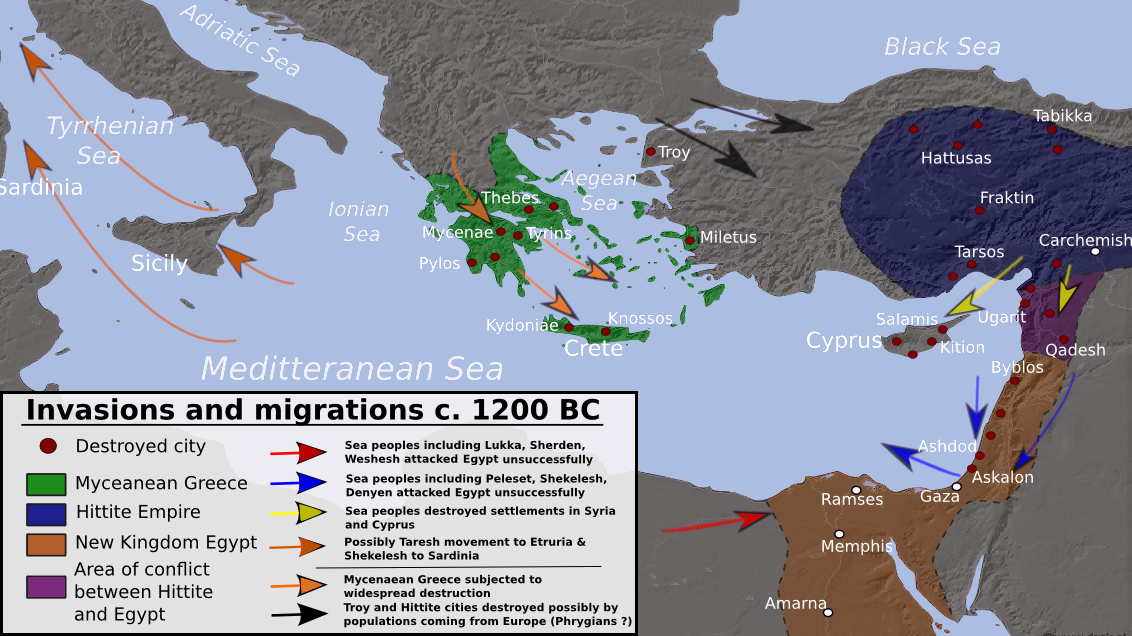
Map of the Late Bronze Age Collapse (c. 1200 BC) in the Eastern Mediterranean

The Bronze Age collapse is the name given by those historians who see the transition from the late Bronze Age to the Early Iron Age as violent, sudden and culturally disruptive, expressed by the collapse of palace economies of the Aegean and Anatolia, which were replaced after a hiatus by the isolated village cultures of the Dark Age period in history of the ancient Middle East. Some have gone so far as to call the catalyst that ended the Bronze Age a "catastrophe". The Bronze Age collapse may be seen in the context of a technological history that saw the slow, comparatively continuous spread of iron-working technology in the region, beginning with precocious iron-working in what is now Romania in the 13th and 12th centuries. The cultural collapse of the Mycenaean kingdoms, the Hittite Empire in Anatolia and Syria, and the Egyptian Empire in Syria and Palestine, the scission of long-distance trade contacts and sudden eclipse of literacy occurred between 1206 and 1150 BC. In the first phase of this period, almost every city between Troy and Gaza was violently destroyed, and often left unoccupied thereafter (for example, Hattusas, Mycenae, Ugarit). The gradual end of the Dark Age that ensued saw the rise of settled Neo-Hittite and Aramaean kingdoms of the mid-10th century BC, and the rise of the Neo-Assyrian Empire.

=== Iron Age ===
During the Early Iron Age, from 911 BC, the Neo-Assyrian Empire arose, vying with Babylonia and other lesser powers for dominance of the region, though not until the reforms of Tiglath-Pileser III in the 8th century BC, did it become a powerful and vast empire. In the Middle Assyrian period of the Late Bronze Age, ancient Assyria had been a kingdom of northern Mesopotamia (modern-day northern Iraq), competing for dominance with its southern Mesopotamian rival Babylonia. From 1365 to 1076, it had been a major imperial power, rivaling Egypt and the Hittite Empire. Beginning with the campaign of Adad-nirari II, it became a vast empire, overthrowing the Twenty-fifth Dynasty of Egypt and conquering Egypt, the Middle East, and large swaths of Asia Minor, ancient Iran, the Caucasus and east Mediterranean. The Neo-Assyrian Empire succeeded the Middle Assyrian period (14th to 10th century BC). Some scholars, such as Richard Nelson Frye, regard the Neo-Assyrian Empire to be the first real empire in human history. During this period, Aramaic was also made an official language of the empire, alongside the Akkadian language.

The states of the Neo-Hittite kingdoms were Luwian, Aramaic and Phoenician-speaking political entities of Iron Age northern Syria and southern Anatolia that arose following the collapse of the Hittite Empire around 1180 BC and lasted until roughly 700 BC. The term "Neo-Hittite" is sometimes reserved specifically for the Luwian-speaking principalities like Melid (Malatya) and Karkamish (Carchemish), although in a wider sense the broader cultural term "Syro-Hittite" is now applied to all the entities that arose in south-central Anatolia following the Hittite collapse – such as Tabal and Quwê – as well as those of northern and coastal Syria.

Urartu was an ancient kingdom of Armenia and North Mesopotamia which existed from c. 860 BC, emerging from the Late Bronze Age until 585 BC. The Kingdom of Urartu was located in the mountainous plateau between Asia Minor, the Iranian plateau, Mesopotamia, and the Caucasus Mountains, later known as the Armenian Highland, and it centered on Lake Van (present-day eastern Turkey). The name corresponds to the Biblical Ararat.

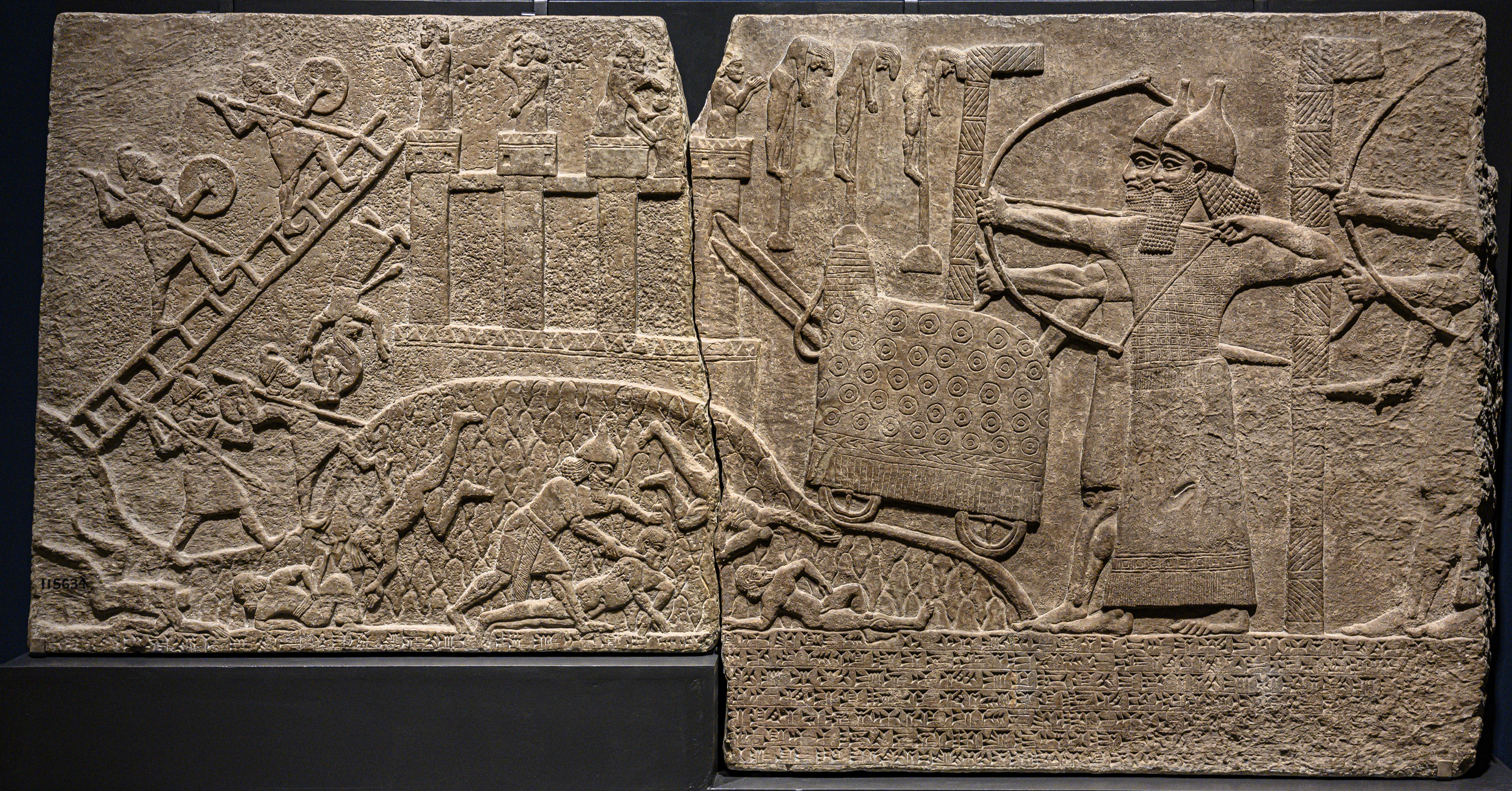
Siege engine in Assyrian relief of attack on an enemy town during the reign of Tiglath-Pileser III, 743–720 BC, from his palace at Nimrud.

Two related Israelite kingdoms known as Israel and Judah emerged in the Southern Levant during the Iron Age. The northern Kingdom of Israel, with its most prominent capital at Samaria, was the more prosperous of the two kingdoms and soon developed into a regional power; during the days of the Omride dynasty, it controlled Samaria, Galilee, the upper Jordan Valley, the Sharon and large parts of the Transjordan. It was destroyed around 720 BC, when it was conquered by the Neo-Assyrian Empire. The southern Kingdom of Judah, with its capital at Jerusalem, survived longer. In the 7th century BC, the kingdom's population increased greatly, prospering under Assyrian vassalage. After the fall of the Neo-Assyrian Empire in 605 BC, the ensuing competition between the Twenty-sixth Dynasty of Egypt and the Neo-Babylonian Empire for control of the Levant resulted with the rapid decline of the kingdom. In the early-6th century BC, Judah was weakened by a series of Babylonian invasions, and in 587–586 BC, Jerusalem was besieged and destroyed by the second Babylonian king, Nebuchadnezzar II, who subsequently exiled the Judeans to Babylon.

The term Neo-Babylonian Empire refers to Babylonia under the rule of the 11th ("Chaldean") dynasty, from the revolt of Nabopolassar in 623 BC until the invasion of Cyrus the Great in 539 BC (Although the last ruler of Babylonia (Nabonidus) was in fact from the Assyrian city of Harran and not Chaldean), notably including the reign of Nebuchadrezzar II. Through the centuries of Assyrian domination, Babylonia enjoyed a prominent status, and revolted at the slightest indication that it did not. However, the Assyrians always managed to restore Babylonian loyalty, whether through the granting of increased privileges, or militarily. That finally changed in 627 BC with the death of the last strong Assyrian ruler, Ashurbanipal, and Babylonia rebelled under Nabopolassar the Chaldean a few years later. In alliance with the Medes and Scythians, Nineveh was sacked in 612 and Harran in 608 BC, and the seat of empire was again transferred to Babylonia. Subsequently, the Medes controlled much of the ancient Near East from their base in Ecbatana (modern-day Hamadan, Iran), most notably most of what is now Turkey, Iran, Iraq, and the South Caucasus.

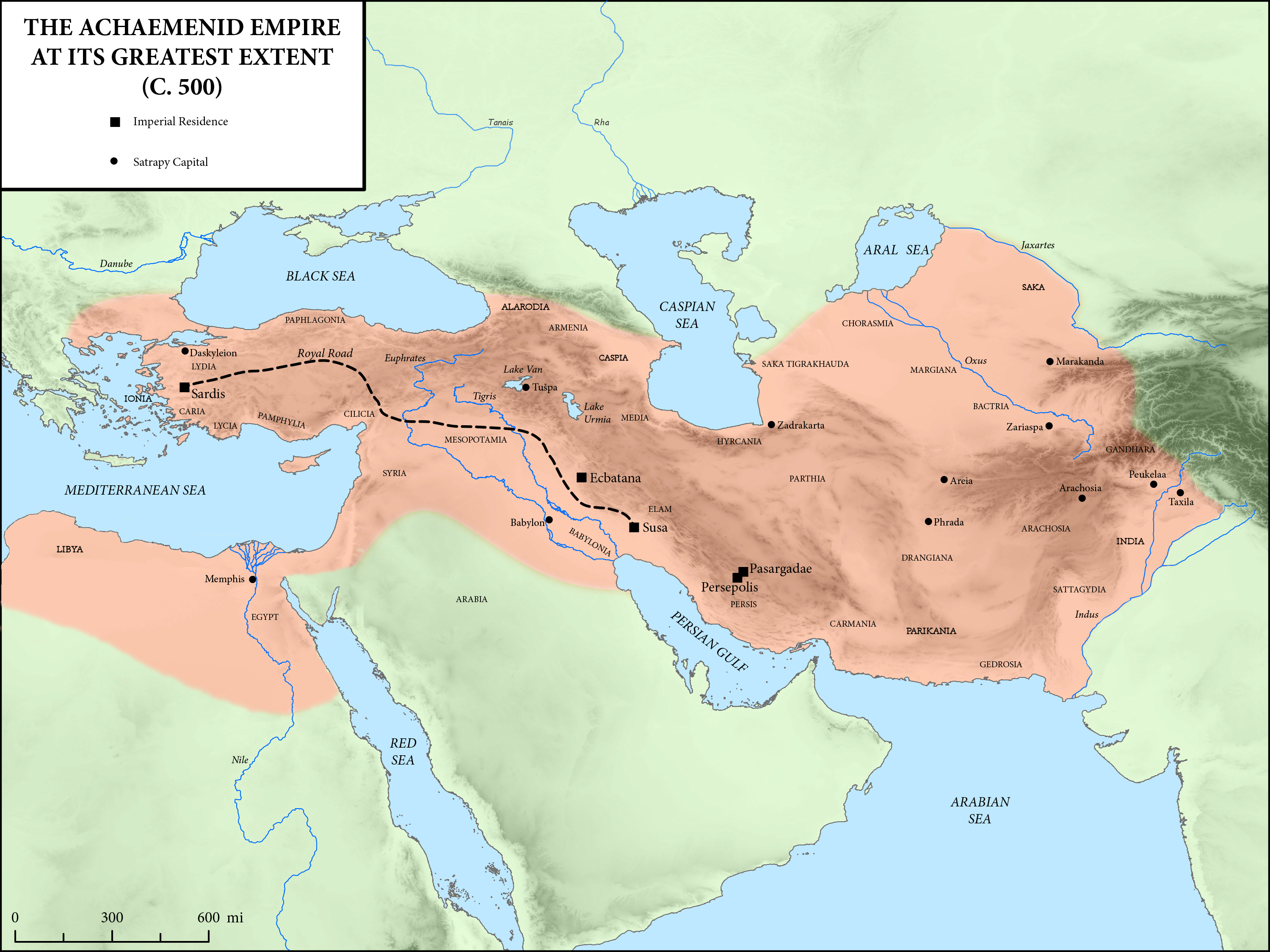
The Achaemenid Empire at its greatest extent c. 500 BC

Following the fall of the Medes, the Achaemenid Empire was the first of the Persian Empires to rule over most of the Near East and far beyond, and the second great Iranian empire (after the Median Empire). At the height of its power, encompassing approximately 7,500,000 km^{2} (2,900,000 sq mi), the Achaemenid Empire was territorially the largest empire of classical antiquity, and the first world empire. It spanned three continents (Europe, Asia, and Africa), including apart from its core in modern-day Iran, the territories of modern Iraq, the Caucasus (Armenia, Georgia, Azerbaijan, Dagestan, Abkhazia), Asia Minor (Turkey), Thrace (parts of eastern Bulgaria), Macedonia (roughly corresponding to present-day Macedonia in northern Greece), many of the Black Sea coastal regions, northern Saudi Arabia, Jordan, Israel, Lebanon, Syria, Afghanistan, Central Asia, parts of Pakistan, and all significant population centers of ancient Egypt as far west as Libya. It is noted in western history as the foe of the Greek city states in the Greco-Persian Wars, for freeing the Israelites from their Babylonian captivity, and for instituting Aramaic as the empire's official language.

In 116–117 AD, most of the ancient Near East (excepting several more marginal regions) was briefly re-united under the rule of the Roman Empire under Trajan.

== See also ==
- Ancient near eastern cosmology
- Ancient Near East studies
- Diplomacy in the ancient Near East
- Economy of Urartu
- Genetic history of the Middle East
- Levantine pottery
- List of cities of the ancient Near East
- List of museums of ancient Near Eastern art
- Religions of the ancient Near East
