= Armeno-Phrygians =

Hypothetical Bronze Age people of West Asia

The Armeno-Phrygians are a hypothetical people of West Asia (specifically of Asia Minor and the Armenian Highlands) during the Bronze Age, the Bronze Age collapse, and its aftermath. They would be the common ancestors of both Phrygians and Proto-Armenians. In turn, Armeno-Phrygians would be the descendants of the Graeco-Phrygians, common ancestors of Greeks, Phrygians, and also of Armenians.

The term "Armeno-Phrygian" is also used for a hypothetical language branch, which would include the languages spoken by the Phrygians and the Armenians, and would be a branch of the Indo-European language family, or a sub-branch of either the proposed "Graeco-Armeno-Aryan" or "Armeno-Aryan" branches.

If the Armeno-Phrygians are accepted as the a priori basis of both the Phrygians and Armenians, there are two main, conflicting theories regarding their origins.

- Phrygia, in western Anatolia, according to the oldest scholarship and some modern scholars, was the likely urheimat of the Proto-Armenians. To cite the prime example of this thesis, the ancient Greek historian Herodotus stated: "the Armenians were equipped like Phrygians, being Phrygian colonists" (Ἀρμένιοι δὲ κατά περ Φρύγες ἐσεσάχατο, ἐόντες Φρυγῶν ἄποικοι, 7.73). There are at least three, distinct but complementary elements to this explanation.
  - According to Ancient Greek scholars, the Phrygians originated in the Balkans as the Bryges, and migrated subsequently to Phrygia; this led some scholars to suggest that Armenians also originated in the Balkans. By the Iron Age, Phrygia encompassed much of western and central Anatolia.
  - According to Igor Diakonoff, the Proto-Armenians migrated eastward from Phrygia, during the Bronze Age collapse (at the end of the 13th century and the first half of 12th century), and blended with the ancient populations of the Armenian highlands, including speakers of Hurro-Urartian languages, to create the Armenians.
  - Ancient Assyrian sources referred to the Proto-Armenians as Mushki. Later Greek sources distinguished between the Phrygians and the Moschoi, suggesting that the Mushki/Moschoi may have originally been a non-Phrygian population that merged with and/or subsumed the Phrygians, to form the Armenians.
- Eastern Anatolia and/or the Armenian highlands, according to some modern scholars was instead the site of the proto-Armeno-Phrygian population, and the Phrygians later migrated westward.
  - According to some scholars, there is evidence of language borrowings (Armenisms) from the Proto-Armenian language into Hittite and Urartian, which would support the presence of Proto-Armenians in the Armenian Highlands, in the lands of ancient Armenia, since at least the end of the 2nd millennium BC.

== Criticism ==
A number of linguists have rejected a close relationship between Armenian and Phrygian, despite saying that the two languages do share some features. Phrygian is now classified as a centum language more closely related to Greek than Armenian, whereas Armenian is mostly satem.

Recent research suggests that there is lack of archaeological and genetic evidence for a group from the Balkans entering eastern Asia Minor or the Armenian Highlands during or after the Bronze Age Collapse (as was suggested by Diakonoff).

Some scholars have suggested that the Mushki (whether they were speakers of Armenian or another language) originated in the Caucasus region and moved westward.

== See also ==
- Armeno-Phrygian (language clade)
- Origin of the Armenians
- List of ancient Armeno-Phrygian peoples and tribes
- Sea peoples
- Bronze Age collapse
- Armenian hypothesis
- Urartu
