= Hayasa-Azzi =

Late Bronze Age confederation in Asia Minor

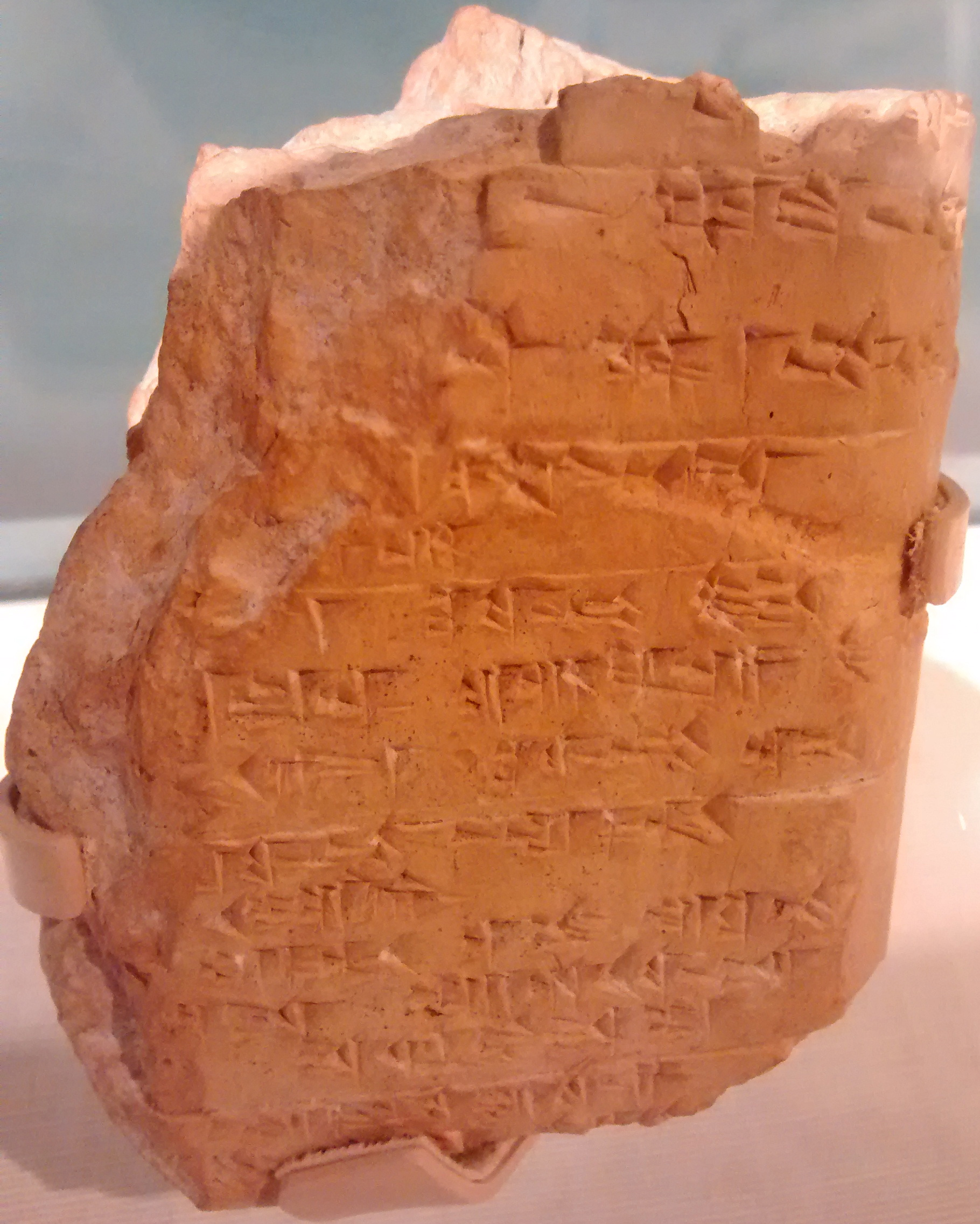
Hittite cuneiform tablet writings where said about the king of Hayasa and king of Azzi

Hayasa(𒆳𒌷𒄩𒄿𒀀𒊭)-Azzi(𒆳𒌷𒀀𒍣) or Azzi-Hayasa (Hittite: ^{URU}Ḫaiaša-, Armenian: Հայասա) was a Late Bronze Age confederation in the Armenian Highlands and/or Pontic region of Asia Minor. The Hayasa-Azzi confederation was in conflict with the Hittite Empire in the 14th century BCE, leading up to the collapse of Hatti around 1190 BCE. It has long been thought that the Hayasa-Azzi have played a significant role in the ethnogenesis of Armenians.

== Location ==
Hittite inscriptions deciphered in the 1920s by the Swiss scholar Emil Forrer testify to the existence of the mountainous country, Hayasa-Azzi, lying to the east of Hatti in the Upper Euphrates region. Its western border seems to have alternated between Samuha (probably just west of modern Sivas) and Kummaha (likely modern Kemah, Erzincan). These areas later geographically overlapped, at least partially, with the Upper Armenia province of the later Kingdom of Armenia and the neighboring region of Lesser Armenia.

Hayasa-Azzi seems to have been bordered by Isuwa (later known as Sophene, now known as Elazig) and Pahhuwa (perhaps near modern Divriği or Bingol Province) to the south or the west. The eastern extent of Hayasa-Azzi is unknown, although some have placed it in the area of modern Tercan, or as far east as Lake Van or the Ararat Plain.

The name Hayasa might possibly be connected to the Iya(ni)/Iga(ni) of Urartian texts. Both Hayasa and Iya(ni)/Iga(ni) have been connected to the Aia of Greek mythology. Alternately, another theory proposes a connection to the Huša(ni), mentioned by the Urartian kings Argishti I and Sarduri II in the 8th century BCE. Iya(ni)/Iga(ni) and Husa(ni) were both probably located in modern Ardahan Province of Turkey.

It is possible that the name Azzi survived into the Classical era as Aza, a city located in the Kelkit River Valley. Alternately, a form of the name Azzi may have continued into the 17th century CE as Azntsik, a district of Ani-Kammahk (Kemah) in Upper Armenia.

Azzi is not to be confused with the similarly named Alzi (Alshe), which was located further south.

== Political structure ==
The exact nature of Hayasa's and Azzi's relationship is uncertain. They are generally thought to have been a confederation of two different kingdoms in what is now northeastern Turkey: Hayasa, in the north, and Azzi, in the south. While separate entities, the two lands were politically and probably linguistically connected. However, there are alternate theories regarding the nature of their relationship. Some have suggested that Azzi was a region or district of Hayasa or that Hayasa and Azzi were different names for the same location. Vartan Matiossian argues that Hayasa was an ethnonym while Azzi was the polity or land in which the Hayasans lived. According to Massimo Forlanini, Hayasa and Azzi may have denoted the same polity, with the name having switched from Hayasa to Azzi following the establishment of a new ruling dynasty or capital.

The Hittite king Suppiluliuma I's treaty with Hakkani of Hayasa addresses "the people of Hayasa." According to Igor Diakonoff, this likely suggests that the Hayasans had a peoples' assembly or council of elders. Similarly, Mursili II later conducted negotiations with "the elders" of Azzi. The nearby land of Pahhuwa may have had a similar governing council.

A possible alternate interpretation of these treaties is that these councils consisted of the chieftains of the various tribes who made up the Hayasa-Azzi confederation.

Although frequently at odds with Hatti, Hittite texts mention that the Hayasans served as charioteers in the Hittite army.

The capital of Hayasa-Azzi is unknown, but its main fortress was Ura, possibly located somewhere near modern Bayburt or along the Kelkit River. Another fortress, Aripsa, may have been located on the shore of Lake Van.

== Religion ==
Not much is known about the Hayasan pantheon but some names survive via Hittite records. It may have involved a triad comprising Ugur, Inanna, and Tarumu.

- Ugur – The chief god of the Hayasan pantheon. Represented by the divine ideogram U.GUR in Hittite records, which is equated with the Sumerian god Nergal. This god's name is unknown, but it may have been a variation of the Hattian god Šulikatte. Probably the father of Terettitunnis and Tarumu. May also have been associated with the Semitic El (Elkunirša in Hittite).
- Inanna – The consort of the chief god of Hayasa. Like her husband, her name has not survived, but it is speculated that she was associated with the Hittite Asertu.
- Terittitunnis – Perhaps related to Greek Triton.
- Tarumu – The sixth god of the Hayasan pantheon. Perhaps connected to Tarhu.
- Baltaik – Possibly a goddess connected to West Semitic Ba'alat (Astarte), with a probable Armenian diminutive suffix -ik (such as is present in the name of the goddess "Astɫik"). Alternately, it could etymologically derive from Proto Indo-European *bʰel– (meaning 'bright'), via the *bʰel-to form.
- Izzistanus(?) – A proposed reconstruction of a damaged name "s/t-an-nu-us". Perhaps a version of Hattian Estan (Ezzi Estan: 'good Estan').
- Unag-astuas or Unagastas – A deity mentioned in the treaty with the Hittites, but with unknown qualities. Possibly connected, etymologically, to Astvats (Classical Armenian: Astuas), a name still used today for God in Armenian Christianity. May have been a form of the Subarian god Astuvanu (Astupinu), who is equated with Sumerian Nergal.

== History ==
=== Early history ===
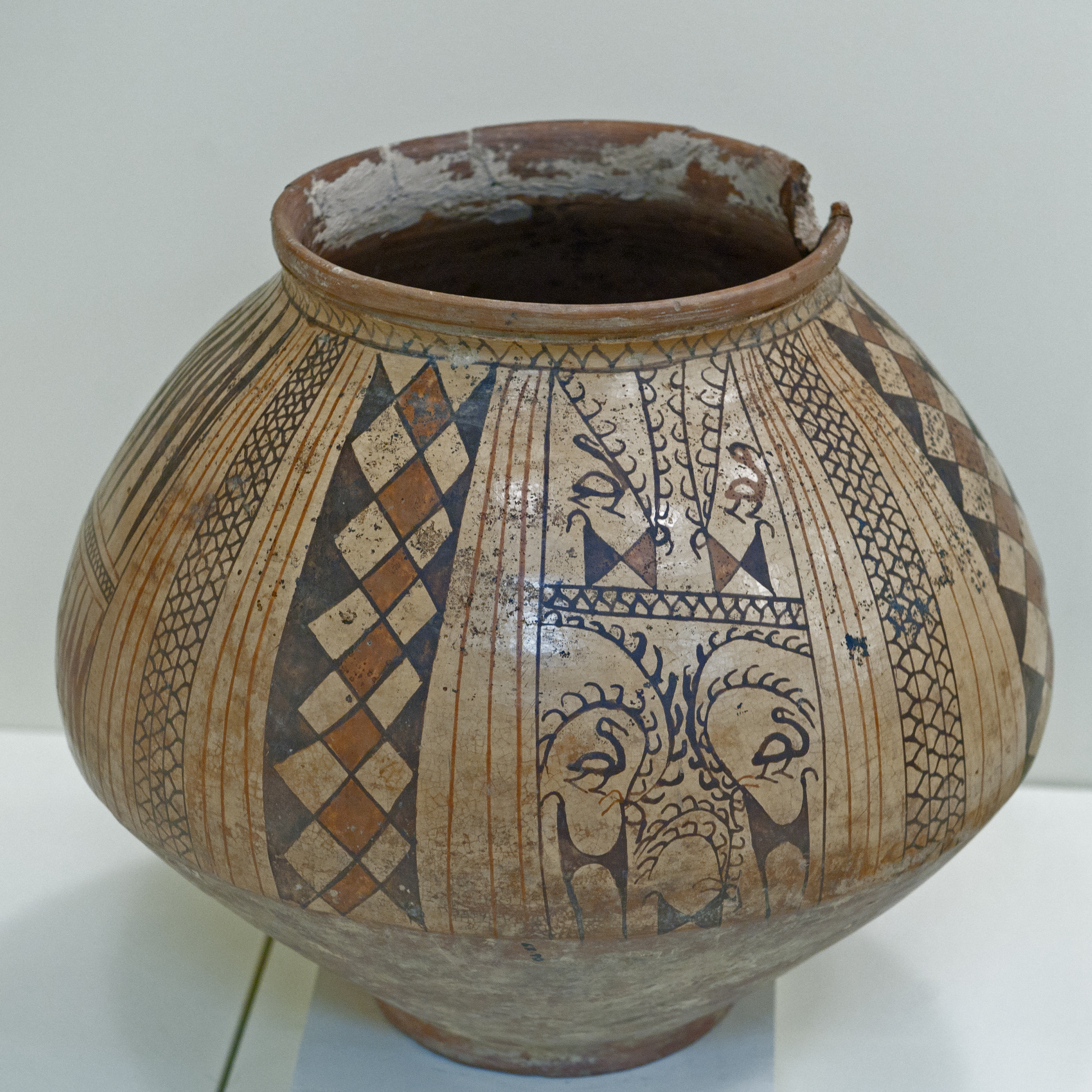
Ceramic vase found near Erzurum, c. 2000 BCE

All information about Hayasa-Azzi comes from the Hittites, there are no primary sources from Hayasa-Azzi. As such, the early history of Hayasa-Azzi is unknown. According to historian Aram Kosyan, it is possible that the origins of Hayasa-Azzi lie in the Trialeti-Vanadzor culture, which expanded from Transcaucasia toward northeastern modern Turkey in the first half of the 2nd millennium BCE. The Trialeti-Vanadzor-connected site of Sos Höyük IV, located in the Erzurum region, may have been associated with Hayasa-Azzi.

=== Tudhaliya III and Suppiluliuma I (1360s–1320s BCE) ===
The Hittite king Tudhaliya III chose to make the city of Samuha, "an important cult centre located on the upper course of the Marassantiya river" as a temporary home for the Hittite royal court sometime after his abandonment of Hattusa in the face of attacks against his kingdom by the Kaska, Hayasa-Azzi and other enemies of his state. Samuha was, however, temporarily seized by forces from the country of Azzi. At this time, the kingdom of Hatti was so besieged by fierce attacks from its enemies that many neighbouring powers expected it to soon collapse. The Egyptian pharaoh, Amenhotep III, even wrote to Tarhundaradu, king of Arzawa: "I have heard that everything is finished and that the country of Hattusa is paralysed" (EA 31, 26–27). However, Tudhaliya managed to rally his forces; indeed, the speed and determination of the Hittite king may have surprised Hatti's enemies including the Kaska and Hayasa-Azzi. Tudhaliya sent his general Suppiluliuma, who would later serve as king himself under the title Suppiluliuma I, to Hatti's northeastern frontiers, to defeat Hayasa-Azzi. The Hayasans initially retreated from a direct battle with the Hittite commander. The Hittitologist Trevor R. Bryce notes, however, that Tudhaliya and Suppiluliuma eventually:

invaded Hayasa-Azzi and forced a showdown with its king Karanni (or Lanni) near the city of Kumaha. The passage (in the 'Deeds of Suppiluliuma') recording the outcome of this battle is missing. But almost certainly, the Hittite campaign resulted in the conquest of Hayasa-Azzi, for subsequently Suppiluliuma established it as a Hittite vassal state, drawing up a treaty with Hakkana, its current ruler.

The Hayasans were now obliged to repatriate all captured Hittite subjects and cede "the border [territory] which Suppiluliuma claimed belonged to the Land of Hatti." Despite the restrictions imposed upon Hakkani, he was not a completely meek and submissive brother-in law of the Hittites in political and military affairs. As a condition for the release of the thousands of Hittite prisoners held in his domain, he demanded first the return of the Hayasan prisoners confined in Hatti.

During their reigns, the cuneiform tablets of Boğazköy begin to mention the names of three successive kings who ruled over a state of Hayasa and/or Azzi. They were Karanni (or Lanni), Mariya, and Hakkani (or Hukkana). Hakkani married a Hittite princess. When Suppiluliuma had become king himself, Hakkani proceeded to marry Suppiluliuma's sister.

In a treaty signed with Hakkani, Suppiluliuma I mentions a series of obligations of civil right:

My sister, whom I gave you in marriage has sisters; through your marriage, they now become your relatives. Well, there is a law in the land of the Hatti. Do not approach sisters, your sisters-in law or your cousins; that is not permitted. In Hatti Land, whosoever commits such an act does not live; he dies. In your country, you do not hesitate to marry your own sister, sister-in law or cousin, because you are not civilized. Such an act cannot be permitted in Hatti.

=== Mursili II (1320s–1290s BCE) ===
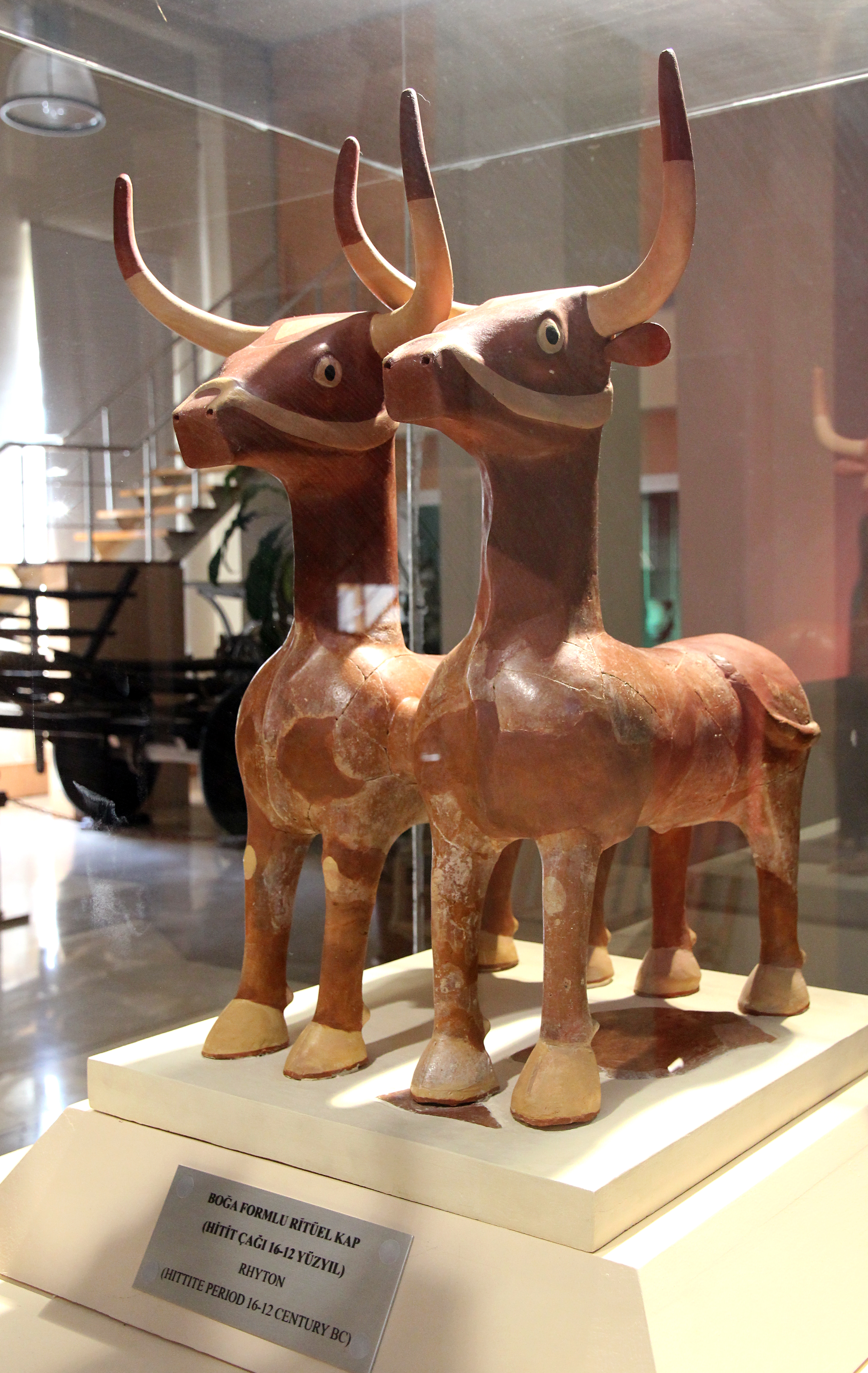
Hittite-era statues found near Sivas, ca. 1600–1200 BCE

The kingdom of Hayasa-Azzi remained a loyal Hittite vassal state for a time, perhaps hit by the same plague which claimed Suppiluliuma and his son Arnuwanda II. But, in Mursili's seventh year (three years before Mursili's eclipse – so, 1315 BCE), the "lord of Azzi" Anniya took advantage of Pihhuniya's unification of the Kaskas and raided the Land of Dankuwa, a Hittite border region, where he transported its population back to his kingdom.

Cavaignac wrote of that period that Anniya "had sacked several districts and refused to release the prisoners taken." Anniya's rebellion soon prompted a Hittite response. The Hittite King Mursili II, having defeated Pihhuniya, marched to the borders of Hayasa-Azzi where he demanded Anniya return his captured subjects. When Anniya refused, Mursili immediately attacked the Hayasa's border fortress of Ura. In the following spring, he crossed the Euphrates and re-organized his army at Ingalova which, about ten centuries later, was to become the treasure-house and burial-place of the Armenian kings of the Arshakuni Dynasty.

Despite Mursili's Year 7 and probable Year 8 campaigns against Hayasa-Azzi, Anniya was still unsubdued and continued to defy the Hittite king's demands to return his people at the beginning of Mursili's Ninth year. Then, in the latter's Year 9, Anniya launched a major counter-offensive by once again invading the Upper Land region on the Northeast frontier of Hatti, destroying the Land of Istitina and placing the city of Kannuwara under siege. Worse still, Mursili II was forced to face another crisis in the same year with the death of his brother Sarri-Kusuh, the Hittite viceroy of Syria. This prompted a revolt by the Nuhašše lands against Hittite control. Mursili II took decisive action by dispatching his general Kurunta to quell the Syrian rebellion while he sent another general, the able Nuwanza (or Nuvanza) to expel the Hayasa-Azzi enemy from the Upper Land. After consulting some oracles, the king ordered Nuwanza to seize the Upper Land territory from the Hayasan forces. This Nuwanza did by inflicting a resounding defeat against the Hayasa-Azzi invaders at the Battle of Ganuvara; henceforth, Upper Land would remain "firmly in Hittite hands for the rest of Mursili's reign under the immediate authority of a local governor appointed by the king." While Mursili II would invade and reconquer Hayasa-Azzi in his tenth year, its formal submission did not occur until the following year of the Hittite king's reign.

The Annals of Mursili describe the campaigns of Mursili against Hayasa-Azzi below:

The people of Nahasse arose and besieged" (name indecipherable). "Other enemies and the people of Hayasa likewise. They plundered Institina, blockaded Ganuvara with troops and chariots. And because I had left Nuvanzas, the chief cup-bearer, and all the heads of the camp and troops and chariots in the High Country, I wrote to Nuvanzas as follows; 'See the people of Hayasa have devastated Institina, and blockaded the city of Ganuvara.' And Nuvanza led troops and chariots for aid and marched to Ganuvara And then he sent to me a messenger and wrote to me; 'Will you not go to consult for me the augur and the foreteller? Could not a decision be made for me by the birds and the flesh of the expiatory victims?

And I sent to Nuvanza this letter: 'See, I consulted for you birds and flesh, and they commanded, Go! because these people of Hayasa, the God U, has already delivered to you; strike them!

And as I was returning from Astatan to Carchemish, the royal prince Nana-Lu came to meet me on the road and said, 'The Hayasan enemy having besieged Ganuvara, Nuvanza marched against him and met him under the walls of Ganuvara. Ten thousand men and seven hundred chariots were drawn up in battle against him, and Nuvanza defeated them. There are many dead and many prisoners.

(Here the tablets are defaced, and 15 lines lost.)

And when I arrived in Tiggaramma, the chief cup-bearer Nuvanza and all the noblemen came to meet me at Tiggaramma. I should have marched to Hayasa still, but the chiefs said to me, 'The season is now far advanced, Sire, Lord! Do not go to Hayasa.' And I did not go to Hayasa.

=== Decline of Hayasa ===
Mursili, himself, could now take satisfaction in the reduction of the hostile and aggressive kingdom of Hayasa-Azzi once more to a Hittite vassal state.

The Hittite Empire at its greatest extent under Suppiluliuma I (c. 1350–1322 BCE), the region north of Ishuwa and Alshe is believed to have been the location of Hayasa-Azzi

After Anniya's defeat, Hayasa-Azzi never appears again in the Hittite (or Assyrian) records as a unified nation. Hayasa as a fighting power was practically eliminated by the expedition of Mursili II.

Azzi, however, continued to be mentioned for some time after references to Hayasa ceased. It is possible that Hayasa was destroyed by Mursili and/or that it became part of Azzi. Mutti, a man from the city Halimana, was mentioned as having greeted Mursili in Azzi. Nothing else is known about him, but he may have been a latter-day king of Azzi. Many of the former districts and towns of Hayasa-Azzi become their own independent city-states following the breakup of the Hayasa-Azzi confederation at the end of the 13th century BCE. Other regions of Azzi probably correspond to areas of the Nairian state of Urartu, mentioned in Assyrian records from around this same time.

The territory of Hayasa-Azzi may have corresponded, at least partially, to Diauehi of Urartian-era texts.

== Hayasa and Armenians ==
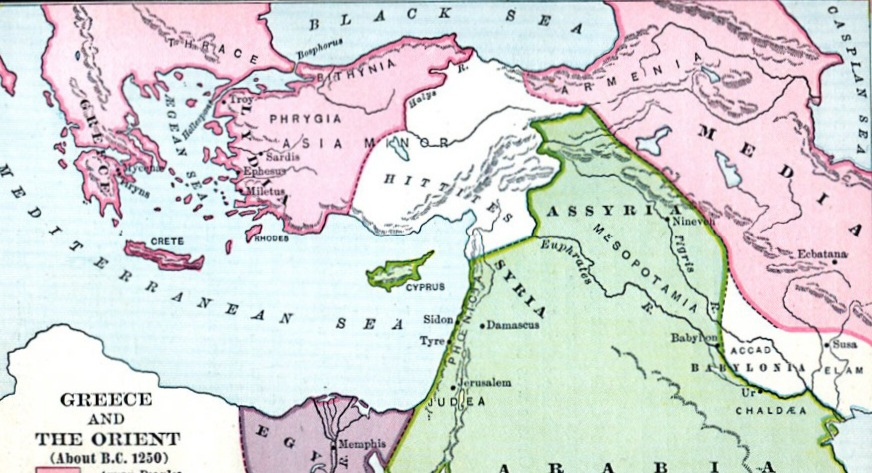
Armenia(Hayasa) in XIII century B.C.

The similarity of the name Hayasa to the endonym of the Armenians, hay, and the Armenian name for Armenia, Hayk’ or Hayastan, has prompted the suggestion that the Hayasa-Azzi confederation was involved in the Armenian ethnogenesis, or perhaps had been an Armenian-speaking state. -assa/-asa are, respectively, Hittite and Hieroglyphic Luwian genitive suffixes. Therefore, Hayasa could have been a Hittite or Luwian name meaning "land of the Hay." This is essentially the same meaning as modern Hayastan. Hayasa-Azzi could have been a Hittite translation of the Armenian Hayots’ azn or "Armenian nation".

Hay may derive from the Proto-Indo-European word *h₂éyos (or possibly *áyos), meaning 'metal'. According to this theory, Hayasa meant "land of metal," referring to the early metallurgy techniques developed in the region.

While the language or languages spoken in Hayasa-Azzi are unknown, there does seem to have been a prevalent non-Anatolian Indo-European linguistic element. This language seems to have had some similarities to Ancient Greek and could have been an early Armenian dialect. The name of the king, Karanni, may be connected to Greek-Macedonian Karanos.

Some scholars argue that the Hayasan king name Mariya is connected to Sanskrit marya, meaning 'young man, warrior', and thus indicates a possible Indo-Iranian presence (perhaps related to the Mitanni) in Hayasa-Azzi. Vartan Matiossian argues instead that this name is a form of Classical Armenian mari, also meaning 'young man'. Both the Sanskrit and Armenian words ultimately derive from the same Proto-Indo-European root, *méryos.

A few of the gods of Hayasa-Azzi recorded in treaties with the Hittites could be connected to Armenian or Greek traditions. Unag-Astuas is likely connected, at least etymologically, to Classical Armenian Astuats (Modern Armenian: Astvats), which means 'God' and continues to be used in Armenian today. Baltaik could be a goddess connected to West Semitic Ba‘alat (Astarte), with a probable Armenian diminutive suffix -ik (such as is present in the name of the Armenian goddess, Astłik). Alternately, it could etymologically derive from Proto Indo-European *bʰel- (meaning 'bright'), via the *bʰel-to form. Terittituniš might be connected to the Triton of Greek mythology.

The region covered by Hayasa-Azzi would later constitute Lesser Armenia, as well as the western and south-western regions of Ancient Armenia. The main temples of many pre-Christian Armenian gods such as Aramadz, Anahit, Mher, Nane, and Barsamin were located where Hayasa had likely been. The treasury and royal burials of the Arsacid (Arshakuni) dynasty would be located in this region as well during the 1st millennium BCE. Ani-Kammahk, probably the Kummaha of Hittite sources, was the main cultic center of the goddess Anahit and the location of the Armenian royal tombs during the Classical era. According to the prominent linguist Hrachia Acharian, the name of the city Kummaha could derive from kmakhk’, the Armenian word for 'skeleton'.

Some scholars believe that Armenians were native to the Hayasa region, or perhaps moved into the Hayasa region from nearby northern or eastern regions (such as modern southern Georgia or northern Armenia). A minority of historians theorize that after the possible Phrygian invasion of the Hittites, the hypothetically named Armeno-Phrygians would have settled in Hayasa-Azzi, and merged with the local people, who were possibly already spread within the western regions of Urartu. However, there is almost no evidence of a close Armenian-Phrygian connection.

The term Hayastan bears resemblance to the ancient Mesopotamian god Haya (ha-ià) and another western deity called Ebla Hayya, related to the god Ea (Enki or Enkil in Sumerian, Ea in Akkadian and Babylonian). Thus, the Great Soviet Encyclopedia of 1962 posited that the Armenians derive from a migration of Hayasa into Shupria in the 12th century BCE. This is open to objection due to the possibility of a mere coincidental similarity between the two names.

=== Criticism of Armenian connection theory ===
The mentioning of the name Armenia can only be securely dated to the 6th century BCE with the Orontid kings and very little is known specifically about the people of Hayasa-Azzi per se.

Igor Diakonoff argues the pronunciation of Hayasa was probably closer to Khayasa, with an aspirated h. According to him, this nullifies the connection to Armenian Hay (հայ). Additionally, he argues that -asa cannot be an Anatolian language suffix as names with this suffix are absent in the Armenian Highlands.

Diakonoff's criticisms have been refuted by Matiossian and others, who argue that, as Hayasa is a Hittite (or Hittite-ized) exonym applied to a foreign land, the -asa suffix can still mean "land of." Additionally, Khayasa can be reconciled with Hay as the Hittite h and kh phonemes are interchangeable, a feature present in certain Armenian dialects as well.

== See also ==
- Ishuwa
- Ancient regions of Anatolia
- Nairi
- Urartu
- History of the Hittites
- History of Armenia
- Indo-European languages
