= Marzpetuni =

Marzpetuni was a family and region of the Ancient Armenia.

Their main rulers were Georg Marzpetuni (c. 950) and Gor or Kor Marzpetuni (c. 970).

== See also ==
- List of regions of ancient Armenia
