= List of museums of ancient Near Eastern art =

This is a list of museums with major art collections from the Ancient Near East.

- British Museum, London, UK. 290,000 objects.
- Vorderasiatisches Museum, Berlin, Germany. 250,000 objects.
- National Museum of Iraq, Baghdad, Iraq. 170,000 objects.
- Musée du Louvre, Paris, France. 100,000 objects.
- Mosul Museum, Iraq.
- Sulaymaniyah Museum, Iraq
- Basra Museum, Iraq
- Oriental Institute, Chicago. 20,000 objects
- Metropolitan Museum of Art, New York. 7,000 objects
- Istanbul Archaeology Museum, Istanbul, Turkey.
- Penn Museum, Philadelphia, Pennsylvania.
- Rijksmuseum van Oudheden, Leiden, The Netherlands.
- Israel Museum, Jerusalem, Israel.
- Eretz Israel Museum, Tel Aviv, Israel.
- Hecht Museum, Haifa, Israel.
- Bible Lands Museum, Jerusalem, Israel.
- Semitic Museum, Cambridge, Massachusetts.
- Musei reali, Turin, Italy
- Vatican Museums, Rome, Italy
