= Bryges =

People of the Ancient Balkans

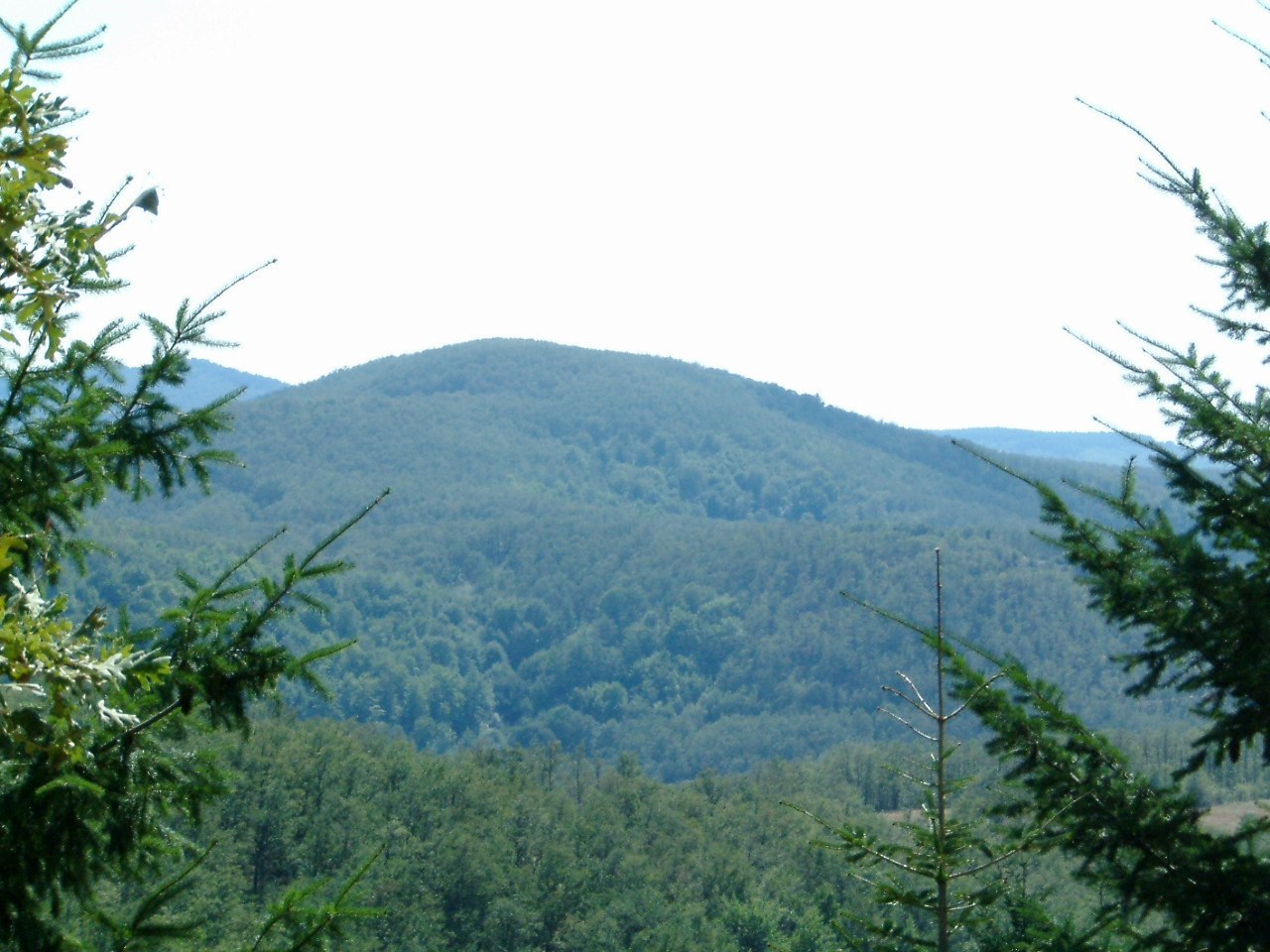
Mount Cholomon, highlands in or near ancient Mygdonia.

Bryges or Briges (Greek: Βρύγοι or Βρίγες) is the historical name given to a people of the ancient Balkans. They are generally considered to have been related to the Phrygians, who during classical antiquity lived in western Anatolia. Both names, Bryges and Phryges, are assumed to be variants of the same root.

== History ==
The earliest mentions of the Bryges are contained in the historical writings of Herodotus, who relates them to Phrygians, stating that according to the Macedonians, the Bryges "changed their name" to Phryges after migrating into Anatolia, a movement which is thought to have happened between 1200 BC and 800 BC perhaps due to the Bronze Age collapse, particularly the fall of the Hittite Empire and the power vacuum that was created. In the Balkans, the Bryges occupied central Albania and some parts of northern Epirus, as well as Macedonia, mainly west of the Axios river, but also Mygdonia, which was conquered by the kingdom of Macedon in the early 5th century BC. They seem to have lived peacefully next to the inhabitants of Macedonia. However, Eugammon in his Telegony, drawing upon earlier epic traditions, mentions that Odysseus commanded the Epirotian Thesprotians against the Bryges. Small groups of Bryges, after the migration to Anatolia and the expansion of the kingdom of Macedon, were still left in northern Pelagonia and around Epidamnus.

Herodotus also mentions that in 492 BC, some Thracian Brygoi or Brygians (Greek: Βρύγοι Θρήικες) fell upon the Persian camp by night, wounding Mardonius himself, though he went on with the campaign until he subdued them. These Brygoi were later mentioned in Plutarch's Parallel Lives, in the Battle of Philippi, as camp servants of Brutus. However, modern scholars state that a historical link between them and the original Bryges cannot be established.

== Archaeology ==
Based on an extremely slight archaeological record, some scholars such as Nicholas Hammond and Eugene N. Borza had suggested that the Brygians and Phrygians were members of the Lusatian culture who migrated into the southern Balkans during the Late Bronze Age. According to Konstantinos Kopanias, there is no archaeological evidence that can be associated with the Brygians to help us pinpoint them on the map; whereas "the Phrygian migration, which is mentioned in the Greek sources to have taken place shortly after the Trojan War, is likely to have occurred much earlier and in many stages."

== Etymology ==
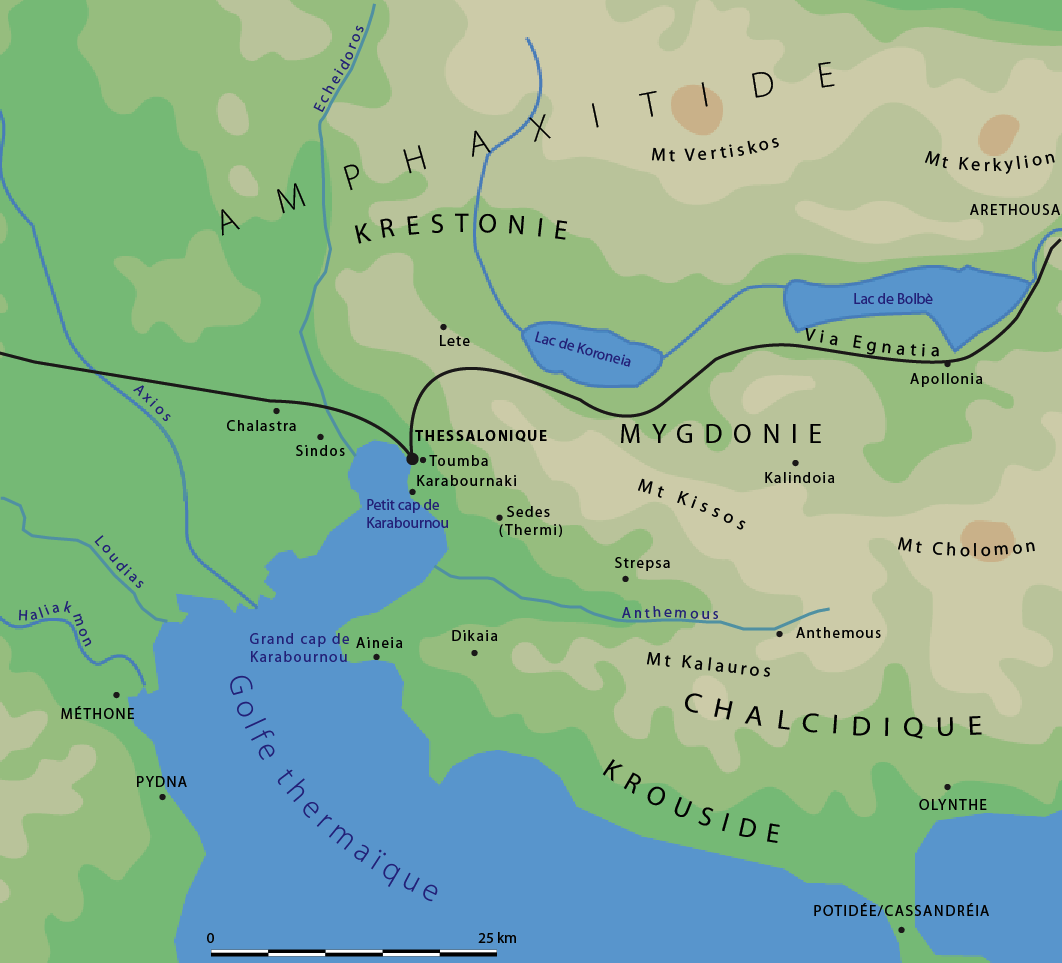
Thessaloniki, location of ancient Mygdonia, Macedonian home of the Bryges.

There is no certain derivation for the name and tribal origin of the Bryges. In 1844, Hermann Müller suggested the name might be related to the same Indo-European root as that of Slavic Breg (shore, hill, slope, mountain), German Berg (mountain) i.e. IE *bʰerǵʰ. It would then be cognate with Western European tribal names such as the Celtic Brigantes and the Germanic Burgundians, and semantically motivated by some aspect of the word meanings "high, elevated, noble, illustrious".

=== Proper names ===
Some personal or geographic names mentioned in ancient authors may be etymologically related to "Bryges":

- Brygean islands in the supposed Adriatic delta of Istros, mentioned in the Argonautica, an epic poem.
- Brygias or Brygium, a city in Lychnitis palus.
- Brygos (son of Aphrodisios) eponym in Epidamnos/Dyrrhachion.
- Brygos (Attic potter, 5th century BC).
- Brygindara (city), Brygindis (local goddess), Brygindarios (citizen) in Rhodes island.

== See also ==
- Phrygia
- Armeno-Phrygian
- Moschoi
- Macedonia
- Thrace
- Phrygian cap
- Bebryces
