= Martiros Kavoukjian =

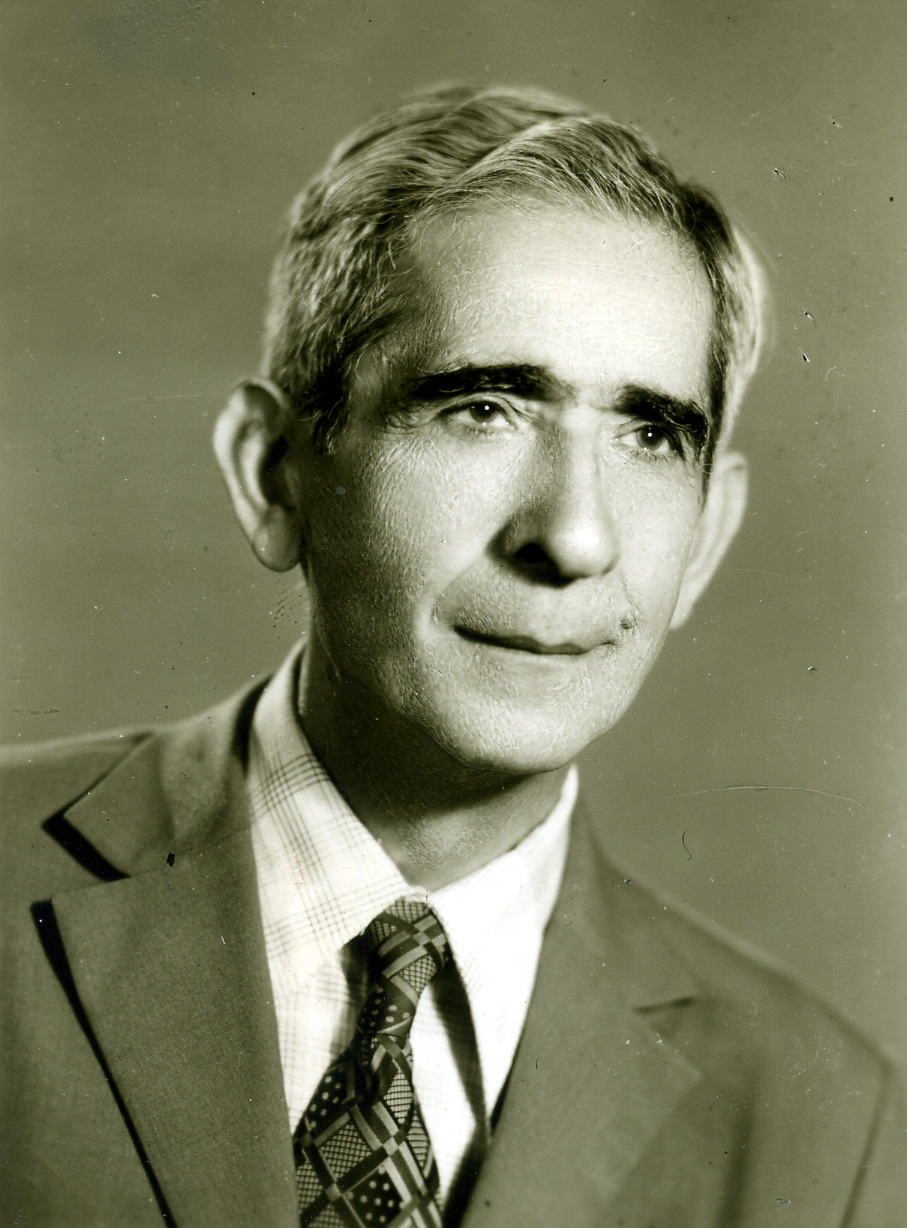
- Born: 8 August 1908; Nigde, Ottoman Empire
- Died: 8 August 1988 (aged 80); Montreal, Quebec, Canada
- Occupations: Architect, researcher
- Writing career
- Period: 1941-1988
- Notable awards: Honored Architect of the Armenian SSR (1972)

Martiros Kavoukjian (Մարտիրոս Գավուգչյան, Gavowgčyan, August 8, 1908 - August 8, 1988) was an Armenian architect, researcher, Armenologist and historian-archaeologist who has written various books on ancient Armenian history. He is best known for his account of Armenian prehistory in Armenia, Subartu And Sumer, published in 1987 in both English and Armenian.

== Biography ==
Martiros Kavoukjian was born in Nigde, Ottoman Empire on August 8, 1908. His family soon moved to Mosul, which was also at the time part of the Ottoman Empire. Kavoukjian graduated from the American University of Beirut in 1934 majoring in Architectural engineering, then worked as the chief municipal architect of Mosul, Iraq during the period from 1941 to 1947. In Iraq, he designed and built both governmental and residential buildings. Kavoukjian immigrated to Armenia in 1947, and in 1947-1979, he played a key role within the "Great Rebuilding Project" of Armenia as the chief architect, building numerous federal, public, industrial, and residential buildings. In 1973, his "The Origin of the Names Armen and Hye and Urartu" was published in Beirut.

Studies of Kavoukjian have been cited in the works by Edgar C. Polomé, Alexander Jacob, George A. Bournoutian, Robert Hewsen, Agop Jack Hacikyan, Levon Shahinyan, Anzhela Teryan, Rafael Ishkhanyan, Karapet Sukiasyan, Lily Stepanyan, but were mostly ignored in Soviet academia.

Armenologist, archimandrite Gomidas Hovnanian in a 2006 interview described Kavoukjian as "a talented scientist" who had written a research on "The ancestral home of the Celtic tribes and Celtic-Caucasian connections".

In 2008 an evening commemorating Kavoukjian's legacy took place in Montreal, Quebec.

=== Armenia, Subartu And Sumer ===
Armenia, Subartu And Sumer
- Author: Martiros Kavoukjian
- Language: English, Armenian
- Genre: Prehistory
- Publisher: M. Kavoukjian
- Publication date: 1987
- Publication place: United States
- Pages: 243

Kavoukjian's book Armenia, Subartu And Sumer is inspired by the Armenian hypothesis of Indo-European origins. It seeks to establish an ethnic Armenian identity for the "Armani" mentioned by Naram-Sin, for "Armani-Subari connections" and "Armani-Subari-Sumer relations". The English translation was published privately with the support of the Malkhassian Foundation, Montreal. The book has been called a "chauvinist attempt to equate the Proto-Armenians with various mentioned peoples in cuneiform and classical sources" by P. Kohl and G. Tzetzkhladze (1996). Robert Hewsen described it is as a "speculative but provocative study."

== Works ==
- The Genesis of Armenian People, Montreal, 1982.
- Armenia, Subartu and Sumer, Montreal, 1989 ISBN 0-921885-00-8
- The origin of the names and Armen Aye, and Urartu, in the subway.) Beirut, 1973

== Bibliography ==
- Armenian Soviet Encyclopedia, Edition-1976, Vol. 2, Pages-697, 698
- THE JOURNAL OF THE SOCIETY FOR ARMENIAN STUDIES, Kavoukjian, Martiros. Armenia, Subartu and Sumer. Review by R.D. Wilkinson. Vol. 5 (1990–1991): pp. 189–192.
