= Battle of Ganuvara =

Hittite victory over the Hayasa-Azzi c. 1312 BC

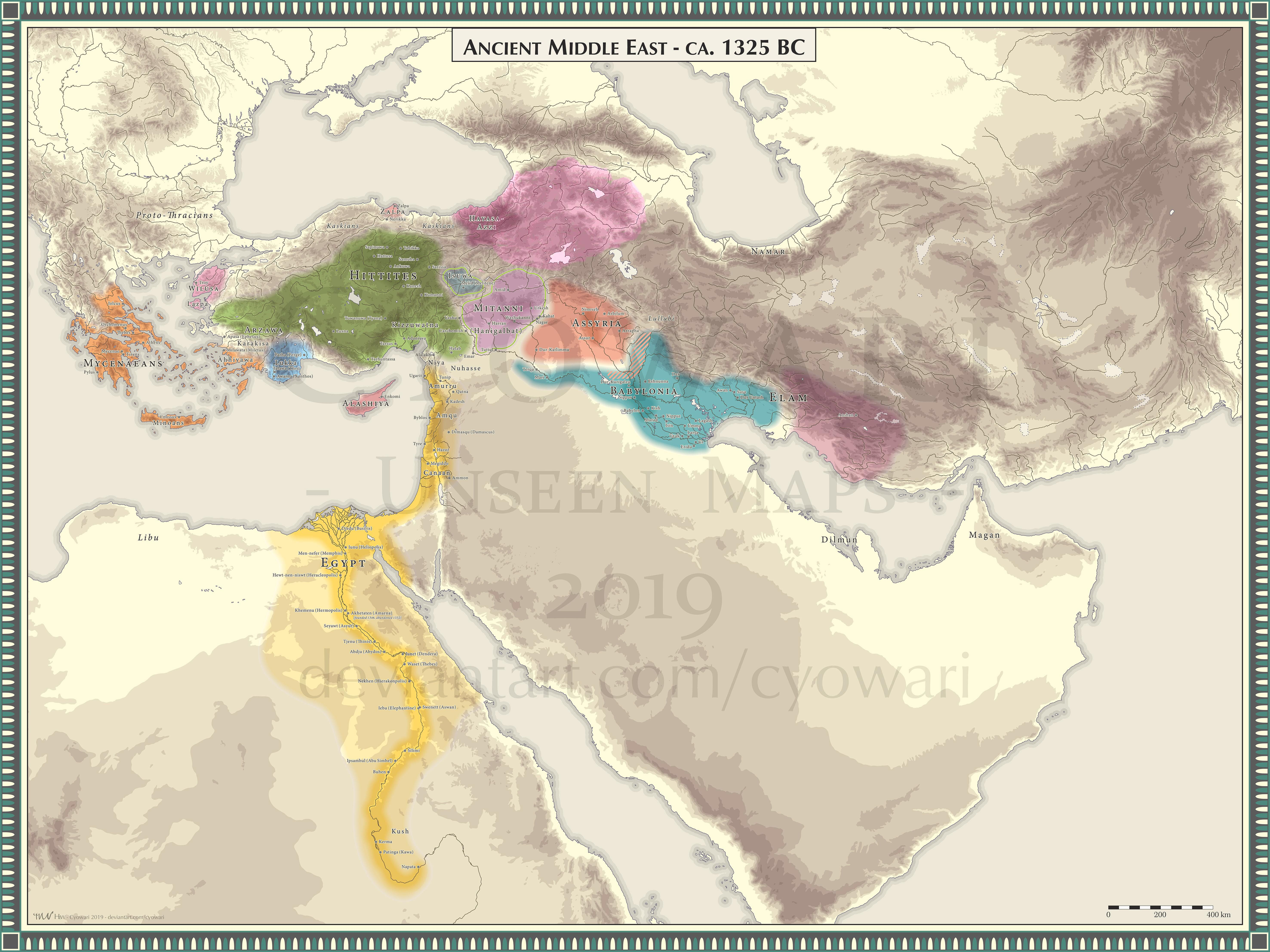
- Map of the Middle East in 1325 BC showing the location of Hittite Empire and the suggested location of the Hayasa Azzi confederation
Date	c. 1312 BC (short chronology)
Location	Ganuvara
Result	Hittite victory

Belligerents
Hittite Empire	Hayasa-Azzi

Commanders and leaders
Nuvanza	Unknown (most likely Anniyash)

Strength
Unknown	10,000 men, 700 chariots

Casualties and losses
Unknown	Unknown, most likely higher

The Battle of Ganuvara, also Kannuwara was fought between the Hittite Empire and the Hayasa-Azzi confederation during the reign of the Hittite king Mursili II. The Hayasa-Azzi had served as one of the Hittite’s most determined enemies for the past half century, however in a battle outside the city of Ganuvara they were decisively defeated by the Hittite general Nuvanza and would never be a threat to the Hittites again.

== Background ==
The Hayasa-Azzi are first recorded when they are one of multiple people groups who invaded the Hittite kingdom during the difficult reign of Tudhaliya II (c.1360 – 1344 BC (short chronology)). Not much about them is known but they were likely a political confederation of multiple small kingdoms (the two most prominent being, of course, the Hayasa and Azzi) whose heartland was located in the Armenian Highlands. They are reported to have seized the important Hittite city of Samuha before Tudhaliya sent his son, general and later Hittite King Suppiluliuma against them. Suppiluliuma defeated the Hayasa-Azzi and forced them to return the captured Hittite territory and become Hittite vassals, thus ending the first period of conflict between the two nations.

However during the reign of Mursili II (c.1321 – 1295 BC (short chronology)), around 20 years after the end of Tudhaliya II’s reign, the new king of Hayasa-Azzi who was called Anniyash (or Anniya) restarted the war with the Hittites along with many other of the Hittites enemies. Anniyash attacked Hittite territory and sacked many cities and then refused to return the prisoners taken. In reaction to this Mursili II launched campaigns against the Hayasa-Azzi during the seventh and eight years of his reign (c. 1314–1313 BC). These campaigns were successful in removing Hayasan forces from Hittite territory but it still didn’t subdue the kingdom. In Mursili II’s ninth year (c.1312 BC) he was unable to attend to the Hayasan problem as rebellion in Syria by the Nuhašše distracted him. Taking advantage of this Anniyash launched another large invasion of Hittite territory, occupying Istitina and besieging the city of Ganuvara. The Annals of Mursili record that the Hayasan army had 10,000 men and 700 chariots. Murisili sent his general and cup bearer called Nuvanza to deal with the threat.

== Battle ==
Nuvanza inflicted a decisive defeat on the Hayasan army outside Ganuvara, as recorded in the Annals of Mursili:

The people of Nahasse arose and besieged" (name indecipherable). "Other enemies and the people of Hayasa likewise. They plundered Institina, blockaded Ganuvara with troops and chariots. And because I had left Nuvanzas, the chief cup-bearer, and all the heads of the camp and troops and chariots in the High Country, I wrote to Nuvanzas as follows; 'See the people of Hayasa have devastated Institina, and blockaded the city of Ganuvara.' And Nuvanza led troops and chariots for aid and marched to Ganuvara And then he sent to me a messenger and wrote to me; 'Will you not go to consult for me the augur and the foreteller? Could not a decision be made for me by the birds and the flesh of the expiatory victims?

And I sent to Nuvanza this letter: 'See, I consulted for you birds and flesh, and they commanded, Go! because these people of Hayasa, the God U, has already delivered to you; strike them!

And as I was returning from Astatan to Carchemish, the royal prince Nana-Lu came to meet me on the road and said, 'The Hayasan enemy having besieged Ganuvara, Nuvanza marched against him and met him under the walls of Ganuvara. Ten thousand men and seven hundred chariots were drawn up in battle against him, and Nuvanza defeated them. There are many dead and many prisoners.

== Aftermath ==
The battle seemingly eradicated the military power of the Hayasa-Azzi confederation as they are never recorded as taking any major military action against anyone again. In his tenth year Mursili invaded their territory and the next year received their formal submission. The Hayasa-Azzi confederation would remain a Hittite vassal until the Hittite Empire’s fall during the Bronze Age Collapse, after which the eventual fate of the confederation remains unknown; it most likely mixed with other peoples in the area and could be the ancestors of the later Urartu kingdom and modern Armenians.
