= Caranus =

Caranus (Ancient Greek: Κάρανος) may refer to:

== People ==
- Caranus of Macedon, legendary progenitor of the royal house of Macedon
- Caranus (son of Philip II) (4th century BC), half-brother of Alexander the Great
- Caranus (hetairos) (died 329 BC), of Alexander the Great
- Caranus (3rd century BC), probably a relative of the hetairos Caranus, whose wedding feast was described in a letter by Hippolochus
- Saint Caraunus of Chartres, 1st or 5th century Christian missionary in Gaul
- Kalanos (4th century BCE), Hindu Brahmin and philosopher, called Caranus by Diodorus Siculus

== Other uses ==
- Karanos, Chania, a village in the Chania regional unit
