= Eugamon of Cyrene =

Ancient Greek poet

Eugamon of Cyrene (Greek: Εὐγάμων ὁ Κυρηναῖος) was an early Greek poet to whom the epic Telegony was ascribed. According to Clement of Alexandria, he stole the poem from the legendary early poet Musaeus; meaning, possibly, that a version of a long-existing traditional epic was written down by Eugamon. He is said to have flourished 567/6 BC, about two centuries after other cyclic poets like Homer.
