= Graeco-Aryan languages =

Hypothetical subfamily of the Indo-European languages

Graeco-Aryan
- Graeco-Armeno-Aryan
- (disputed)
- Geographic distribution: Southern Europe, South, Central, West Asia and the Caucasus
- Linguistic classification: Indo-European: Graeco-Aryan
- Proto-language: Proto-Graeco-Aryan
- Subdivisions: Hellenic; Indo-Iranian; Armenian

Language codes

Graeco-Aryan, or Graeco-Armeno-Aryan, is a hypothetical clade within the Indo-European family that would be the ancestor of Hellenic, Armenian, and the Indo-Iranian languages, which spans Southern Europe, Armenian highlands and Southern Asian regions of Eurasia.

The Graeco-Armeno-Aryan group supposedly branched off from the parent Indo-European stem by the mid-3rd millennium BC.

== Relation to the possible homeland ==
In the context of the Kurgan hypothesis, Graeco-Aryan is also known as "Late Proto-Indo-European" or "Late Indo-European" to suggest that Graeco-Aryan forms a dialect group, which corresponds to the latest stage of linguistic unity in the Indo-European homeland in the early part of the 3rd millennium BC. By 2500 BC, Proto-Greek and Proto-Indo-Iranian had separated and moved respectively westward and eastward from the Pontic Steppe.

If Graeco-Aryan is a valid group, Grassmann's law may have a common origin in Greek and Sanskrit. However, Grassmann's law in Greek postdates certain sound changes that happened only in Greek, not Sanskrit, which suggests that it could not have been inherited directly from a common Graeco-Aryan stage. Rather, it is more likely that an areal feature spread across a then-contiguous Graeco-Aryan–speaking area. That would have occurred after early stages of Proto-Greek and Proto-Indo-Iranian had developed into separate dialects but before they ceased to be in geographic contact.

== History of research and related proposals ==
Evidence for the existence of a Graeco-Aryan subclade was given by Wolfram Euler's 1979 examination of shared features in Greek and Sanskrit nominal inflection. Graeco-Aryan is invoked in particular in studies of comparative mythology such as Martin Litchfield West (1999) and Calvert Watkins (2001).

Tamaz V. Gamkrelidze and Vyacheslav V. Ivanov included Armenian in Graeco-Aryan and argued for a primary split of Graeco-Aryan into a Greek branch with Greek as its only member, and an Armenian-Aryan branch that comprises Armenian and Indo-Iranian.

Graeco-Aryan has comparatively wide support among Indo-Europeanists who support the Armenian hypothesis, which asserts that the homeland of the Indo-European language family was in the Armenian Highlands.

A related proposal, Graeco-Armenian, assumes a special relation between Greek and Armenian to the exclusion of other Indo-European branches and has been popular among experts since the beginning of the 20th century, although it has not gained general acceptance, and its validity has been questioned.

Modern archaeogenetics studies report that Bronze Age Greeks and Armenians derived their steppe ancestry directly from the Yamnaya culture people of the Pontic Steppe, in contrast to the Proto-Indo-Iranian-speaking Andronovo and Sintashta cultures, whose steppe ancestry was Corded Ware-related. This seems to lend credence to the Graeco-Armenian theory, while undermining the Graeco-Aryan theory.

== Sources ==
- Beckwith, Christopher I. (16 March 2009). Empires of the Silk Road: A History of Central Eurasia from the Bronze Age to the Present. Princeton University Press. ISBN 978-0-691-13589-2.
