= Graeco-Armenian languages =

Hypothetical common ancestor of Greek and Armenian languages

Graeco-Armenian
- (proposed)
- Geographic distribution: Southern Europe and the Caucasus
- Linguistic classification: Indo-European: Graeco-Armenian
- Proto-language: Proto-Graeco-Armenian
- Subdivisions: Hellenic; Armenian; Phrygian †

Language codes

Graeco-Armenian (or Helleno-Armenian) is the hypothetical common ancestor of Greek (or Hellenic) and Armenian branches that postdates the Proto-Indo-European language. Its status is somewhat similar to that of the Italo-Celtic grouping: each is widely considered plausible without being generally accepted. The hypothetical Proto-Graeco-Armenian stage would need to date to the 3rd millennium BC and would be only barely different from either late Proto-Indo-European or Graeco-Armeno-Aryan.

== History ==
The Graeco-Armenian hypothesis originated in 1924 with Holger Pedersen, who noted that agreements between Armenian and Greek lexical cognates are more common than between Armenian and any other Indo-European language. During the mid-to-late 1920s, Antoine Meillet further investigated morphological and phonological agreements and postulated that the parent languages of Greek and Armenian were dialects in immediate geographical proximity to their parent language, Proto-Indo-European. Meillet's hypothesis became popular in the wake of his Esquisse d'une grammaire comparée de l'arménien classique.

G. R. Solta does not go as far as postulating a Proto-Graeco-Armenian stage but concludes that the lexicon and the morphology clearly make Greek the language that is the most closely related to Armenian. Eric Hamp supports the Graeco-Armenian thesis and even anticipates a time that "we should speak of Helleno-Armenian" (the postulate of a Graeco-Armenian proto-language).

James Clackson is more reserved, considers the evidence of a Graeco-Armenian subgroup to be inconclusive and believes Armenian to be in a larger Graeco-Armeno-Aryan family. Hrach Martirosyan argues that the case for a common Graeco-Armenian language is not as strong as it is for Indo-Iranian and Balto-Slavic by citing Clackson's "thorough, albeit somewhat hypercritical treatment". Martirosyan suggests that "[t]he contact relations between Proto-Greek and Proto-Armenian may have been intense, but these similarities are considered insufficient to be viewed as evidence for discrete Proto-Graeco-Armenian." In a 2013 study, Martirosyan made a preliminarily conclusion that "Armenian, Greek, (Phrygian) and Indo-Iranian were dialectally close to each other. Within this hypothetical dialect group, Proto-Armenian was situated between Proto-Greek (to the west) and Proto-Indo-Iranian (to the east). The Indo-Iranians then moved eastwards, while the Proto-Armenians and Proto-Greeks remained in a common geographical region for a long period and developed numerous shared innovations."

Evaluation of the hypothesis is tied up with the analysis of Indo-European languages, such as Phrygian and languages within the Anatolian subgroup (such as Hittite), many of which are poorly attested, but which were geographically located between the Greek and Armenian-speaking areas, and which would therefore be expected to have traits intermediate between the two. While Greek is attested from very early times, allowing a secure reconstruction of a Proto-Greek language dating to the 3rd millennium BC, or c. 2000 BC, the history of Armenian is opaque, with its earliest attestation being the 5th-century Bible translation of Mesrop Mashtots. Armenian has many loanwords showing traces of long language contact with Greek and Indo-Iranian languages; in particular, it is a satem language. Also, although Armenian and Attic (Ancient) Greek share a voiceless aspirate series, they originate from different PIE series (in Armenian from voiceless consonants and in Greek from the voiced aspirates).

In a 2005 publication, a group of linguists and statisticians, comprising Luay Nakhleh, Tandy Warnow, Donald Ringe and Steven N. Evans, compared quantitative phylogenetic linguistic methods and found that a Graeco-Armenian subgroup was supported by five procedures: maximum parsimony, weighted versus unweighted maximum compatibility, neighbor-joining, and the widely-criticized binary lexical coding technique (devised by Russell Gray and Quentin D. Atkinson).

An interrelated problem is whether a "Balkan Indo-European" subgroup of Indo-European exists, which would consist not only of Hellenic and Armenian but also Albanian and possibly also some extinct languages, such as Phrygian. The Balkan subgroup, in turn, is supported by the lexico-statistical method of Hans J. Holm. However, Donald Ringe has stated and reiterated a finding to the effect that Albanian was descended from a language that formed a clade with Proto-Germanic (rather than the other Balkan languages), which surprised him.

The authors of a 2022 genetic study argued that Armenian and Greek are related by "their shared Yamnaya heritage."

== Criticism ==
Many modern scholars have rejected the Graeco-Armenian hypothesis, arguing that the linguistic proximity between the two languages has been overstated. Clackson asserts that the Armenian language is as close to Indo-Iranian as it is to Greek and Phrygian. Ronald I. Kim has noted unique morphological developments connecting Armenian to Balto-Slavic. In sum, Clackson and Kim argue that the Armenian language is closest to Indo-Iranian and Balto-Slavic, and the similarities in the development of Armenian with Greek and Phrygian are random and independent of each other.

== See also ==
- Armenian hypothesis
- Proto-Armenian
- Phrygians
