= Ancient Armenia =

Armenia during Antiquity

Ancient Armenia refers to the history of Armenia during Antiquity. It follows Prehistoric Armenia and covers a period of approximately one thousand years, beginning at the end of the Iron Age with the events that led to the dissolution of the Kingdom of Urartu, and the emergence of the first geopolitical entity called Armenia in the 6th century BC. Highlights of this period include the rise of ancient Armenia as an important state in Western Asia in the 4th century BC; a briefly held empire under Julius Caesar's contemporary the Great King Tigranes II ("the Great"); the kingdom's official conversion to Christianity in 301; and the creation of the Armenian alphabet in the year 405. It concludes with the demise of the Armenian kingdom and the country's partition later in the 5th century, marking the beginning of Medieval Armenia.

== Prehistory ==
During the Iron Age, in the region the ancient Assyrians called Urartu (called Bianili by the Urartians themselves), various tribal confederations and kingdoms emerged; these groups included the Hayasa-Azzi, Shupria, Nairi, the Mushki, and possibly a group retroactively referred to as Armeno-Phrygians. In the 9th century BC, tribes from the vicinity of Lake Van established the Kingdom of Van (Urartian: Bianili) to defend the highlands from Assyria, effectively uniting the disparate tribes of the highlands into one realm and beginning the process of amalgamation of its peoples. The kingdom ultimately collapsed in the 6th century BC at the hands of invading Medes, and a realm called "Armenia" emerged from the territory of the fallen kingdom shortly after.

As the Armenian identity developed in the region, the memory of Urartu faded and disappeared. Parts of its history passed down as popular stories and were preserved in Armenia, as written by Movses Khorenatsi in the form of garbled legends in his 5th century book History of Armenia, where he speaks of a first Armenian Kingdom in Van which fought wars against the Assyrians. Khorenatsi's stories of these wars with Assyria would help in the rediscovery of Urartu.

== Satrapy of Armenia ==
It is unclear where the exonym Armenia derived from; the earliest ever record that can confidently be considered Armenia appears in a trilingual Persian inscription as Armina in the Old Persian language and as Harminuya in the Elamite language, whereas the older name for the region, Urartu, was used in the Babylonian translation (see: Name of Armenia).

=== Orontid dynasty ===
Armenia emerged as a kingdom under the Orontid dynasty (Armenian: Երվանդունի Yervanduni) in 570 BC, but had become a subject of the Persian Empire in 553 BC, as a satrapy. This period was marked with several Armenian revolts and struggles to gain independence from the Persian Empire.

== Kingdom of Armenia ==
The satrapy of Armenia became an independent kingdom in 321 BC, after the conquests of Alexander the Great, but soon became incorporated as one of the Hellenistic kingdoms of the Seleucid Empire.

=== Artaxiad dynasty ===
The Artaxiad dynasty (Armenian: Արտաշեսյան Artashesian) rose to power and replaced the Orontids as rulers of Armenia in 189 BC.

During this time, Armenia was divided into several regions and kingdoms ruled by Armenian dynasties:

- Armenia Major (Armenian: Մեծ Հայք Mets Hayk), the main Armenian dominion.
- Armenia Minor (Armenian: Փոքր Հայք Pokr Hayk), also known as Lesser Armenia; initially ruled by the Orontid dynasty, but later ruled by Persians and Romans.
- Sophene (Armenian: Ծոփք Tsopk)
- Commagene (Armenian: Կոմմագենե Kommagene)

==== Armenian Empire ====
During the eastern expansion of the Roman Empire, the Kingdom of Armenia, under Tigranes II (Armenian: Տիգրան Բ Tigran B), extinguished the Seleucid Empire, and between 84 BC to 59 BC, extended Armenia to reach the largest size it would ever become in its history, stretching from the Caspian sea in the east to the Mediterranean Sea in the west. Tigranes' empire was short-lived, however, as it would be defeated by Rome, after which the succeeding kings of Armenia ruled as Roman clients.

=== Arsacid dynasty ===
Following the fall of the Armenian Empire, Armenia was contested between Rome and Parthia. For centuries, Armenia would find itself alternating between being independent, under Roman rule, and under Parthian rule (later Byzantine and Sassanian, respectively). During this period, the Artaxiad dynasty was overthrown by the Romans in 12 AD, and the Arsacid dynasty (Armenian: Արշակունի Arshakuni) rose to take their place as the rulers of Armenia in 54. Although the Arsacid dynasty ruled Armenia, it would continue to be contested between the Roman and Iranian empires.

==== Conversion to Christianity ====
In 301, Tiridates III (Armenian: Տրդատ Գ Trdat III) proclaimed Christianity as the state religion of Armenia, making Armenia the first state to embrace Christianity as the official state religion.

==== Creation of the Armenian Alphabet ====
Until this time, Armenians were using Greek scripts to write. But they had an alphabet of their own. The rise of Christianity in Armenia brought the need to express the Armenian language more clearly, but as these scripts were not well suited for the Armenian language, it made preaching the Gospel difficult. This motivated a Christian theologian named Mesrop Mashtots (Armenian: Մեսրոպ Մաշտոց) to invent the Armenian alphabet in 405 and facilitate the spread of Christianity within Armenia and the neighboring kingdoms which Armenia had influence over (Iberia and Albania).

=== Fall of Armenia ===
After the division of the Roman Empire into Western and Eastern empires, and the rise of the Sassanian dynasty in Iran, Armenia would be on the frontier of the Roman–Sasanian wars. This would ultimately lead to the partitioning of Armenia into Byzantine Armenia in 387 and Sassanian Armenia in 428, which would bring an end to the history of ancient Armenia, and begin the period of Medieval Armenia.
