= Armenian hypothesis =

Hypothesis in Indo-European historical linguistics

The Armenian hypothesis, also known as the Near Eastern model, is a theory of the Proto-Indo-European homeland, initially proposed by linguists Tamaz V. Gamkrelidze and Vyacheslav Ivanov in the early 1980s, which suggests that the Proto-Indo-European language was spoken during the 5th–4th millennia BC in "eastern Anatolia, the southern Caucasus, and northern Mesopotamia".

Recent ancient DNA research has led to renewed suggestions of a Caucasian homeland for a "pre-proto-Indo-European". Particularly, an admixture between the Khvalynsk and Caucasian Copper Age burials gave rise to the ancestry that later became known as a typical marker (WSH – Western Steppe Herders) of the Yamnaya pastoralists. It also lends support to the Indo-Hittite hypothesis, according to which both proto-Anatolian and proto-Indo-European split off from a common mother language "no later than the 4th millennium BCE". These suggestions have been disputed in other recent research, which still locates the origin of the ancestor of proto-Indo-European in the Eastern European/Eurasian steppe or from a hybridization of both steppe and Northwest-Caucasian languages. (Note: Soviet and post-Soviet Russian archaeologists have proposed an East Caspian influence, via the eastern Caspian areas, on the formation of the Don-Volga cultures. See also Ancient DNA Era (11 January 2019), How did CHG get into Steppe_EMBA ? Part 2 : The Pottery Neolithic Yet, Mallory notes that "[t]he Kelteminar culture has on occasion been connected with the development of early stockbreeding societies in the Pontic-Caspian region, the area which sees the emergence of the Kurgan tradition, which has been closely tied to the early Indo-Europeans [...] Links between the two regions are now regarded as far less compelling and the Kelteminar culture is more often viewed more as a backwater of the emerging farming communities in Central Asia than the agricultural hearth of Neolithic societies in the steppe region. The "Sogdiana hypothesis" of Johanna Nichols places the homeland in the fourth or fifth millennium BCE to the east of the Caspian Sea, in the area of ancient Bactria-Sogdiana. From there, PIE spread north to the steppes, and south-west towards Anatolia. Nichols eventually rejected her theory, finding it incompatible with the linguistic and archaeological data. Following Nichols' initial proposal, Kozintsev has argued for an Indo-Uralic homeland east of the Caspian Sea. From this homeland, Indo-Uralic PIE-speakers migrated south-west, and split in the southern Caucasus, forming the Anatolian and steppe languages at their respective locations. Bernard Sergent has elaborated on the idea of east Caspian influences on the formation of the Volga culture, arguing for a PIE homeland in the east Caspian territory, from where it migrated north. Sergent notes that the lithic assemblage of the first Kurgan culture in Ukraine (Sredni Stog II), which originated from the Volga and South Urals, recalls that of the Mesolithic-Neolithic sites to the east of the Caspian Sea, Dam Dam Chesme II and the cave of Djebel. Yet, Sergent places the earliest roots of Gimbutas' Kurgan cradle of Indo-Europeans in an even more southern cradle, and adds that the Djebel material is related to a Paleolithic material of Northwestern Iran, the Zarzian culture, dated 10,000–8,500 BCE, and in the more ancient Kebarian of the Near East. He concludes that more than 10,000 years ago the Indo-Europeans were a small people grammatically, phonetically and lexically close to Semitic-Hamitic populations of the Near East. See also "New Indology", (2014), Can we finally identify the real cradle of Indo-Europeans?.) The origin of the Anatolian languages according to the Near Eastern model has also been challenged because "[a]mong comparative linguists, a Balkan route for the introduction of Anatolian IE is generally considered more likely than a passage through the Caucasus, due to, for example, greater Anatolian IE presence and language diversity in the west."

== Hypothesis ==
Gamkrelidze and Ivanov presented their hypothesis in Russian in 1980–1981 in two articles in Vestnik drevnej istorii. During the following years they expanded and developed their work into their voluminous book, published in Russian in 1984; the English translation of the book appeared in 1995. In English a short sketch of the hypothesis first appeared in The Early History of Indo-European Languages, published in Scientific American in 1990. Tamas Gamkrelidze published an update to the hypothesis in 2010.

According to Gamkrelidze and Ivanov, the Indo-European languages derive from a language originally spoken in the wide area of Armenian Highlands, the southern Caucasus, and northern Mesopotamia. The Anatolian languages, including Hittite, split off before 4000 BCE, and migrated into Anatolia at around 2000 BCE. Around 4000 BCE, the proto-Indo-European community split into Greek-Armenian-Indo-Iranians, Celto-Italo-Tocharians, and Balto-Slavo-Germanics. At around 3000–2500 BCE, Greek moved to the west, while the Indo-Aryans, the Celto-Italo-Tocharians and the Balto-Slavo-Germanics moved east, and then northwards along the eastern slope of the Caspian Sea. The Tocharians split from the Italo-Celtics before 2000 BCE and moved further east, while the Italo-Celtics and the Balto-Slavo-Germanics turned west again towards the northern slopes of the Black Sea. From there, they expanded further into Europe between around 2000 and 1000 BCE.

The phonological peculiarities of the consonants proposed in the glottalic theory would be best preserved in Armenian and the Germanic languages. Proto-Greek would be practically equivalent to Mycenaean Greek from the 17th century BC and would closely associate Greek migration to Greece with the Indo-Aryan migration to the Indian subcontinent at about the same time (the Indo-European expansion at the transition to the Late Bronze Age, including the possibility of Indo-European Kassites).

== Reception ==
=== Renewed interest ===
Recent DNA-research (2015–2018) has led to renewed suggestions of a Caucasian homeland for a "proto-proto-Indo-European". It also has been proposed by some to lend support to the Indo-Hittite hypothesis, according to which both proto-Anatolian and proto-Indo-European split-off from a common mother language "no later than the 4th millennium BCE".

Haak et al. (2015) states that "the Armenian plateau hypothesis gains in plausibility" since the Yamnaya partly descended from a Near Eastern population, which resembles present-day Armenians. Yet, they also state that "the question of what languages were spoken by the 'Eastern European Hunter-Gatherers' and the southern, Armenian-like, ancestral population remains open."

David Reich, in his 2018 publication Who We Are and How We Got Here, noting the presence of some Indo-European languages (such as Hittite) in parts of ancient Anatolia, states that "the most likely location of the population that first spoke an Indo-European language was south of the Caucasus Mountains, perhaps in present-day Iran or Armenia, because ancient DNA from people who lived there matches what we would expect for a source population both for the Yamnaya and for ancient Anatolians." Yet, Reich also notes that "...the evidence here is circumstantial as no ancient DNA from the Hittites themselves has yet been published." Nevertheless, Reich also states that some, if not most, of the Indo-European languages were spread by the Yamnaya people.

According to Kroonen et al. (2018), Damgaard et al. (2018) aDNA studies in Anatolia "show no indication of a large-scale intrusion of a steppe population", but do "fit the recently developed consensus among linguists and historians that the speakers of the Anatolian languages established themselves in Anatolia by gradual infiltration and cultural assimilation." They further note that this lends support to the aforementioned Indo-Hittite hypothesis.

Wang et al. (2018) note that the Caucasus served as a corridor for gene flow between the steppe and cultures south of the Caucasus during the Eneolithic and the Bronze Age, stating that this "opens up the possibility of a homeland of PIE south of the Caucasus." However, Wang et al. also acknowledge that according to genetic evidence, an origin of the Proto-Indo-European language in the North Pontic/Caucasus region is possible, noting:

latest ancient DNA results from South Asia suggest an LMBA spread via the steppe belt. Irrespective of the early branching pattern, the spread of some or all of the PIE branches would have been possible via the North Pontic/Caucasus region and from there, along with pastoralist expansions, to the heart of Europe. This scenario finds support from the well attested and widely documented "steppe ancestry" in European populations and the postulate of increasingly patrilinear societies in the wake of these expansions.

Kristian Kristiansen, in an interview with Der Spiegel in May 2018, stated that the Yamnaya culture may have had a predecessor at the Caucasus, where "proto-proto-Indo-European" was spoken.

Lazaridis et al. (2022) outline genetic evidence for Reich and Wang's "south of the Caucasus" model. The authors suggest a primary Indo-Anatolian homeland in Western Asia and/or the Caucasus, with the Eurasian steppe serving as a secondary Indo-European homeland after the Anatolian branch split off.

=== Criticism ===
John A. C. Greppin wrote, in a 1986 review of Gamkrelidze and Ivanov, that "a large number of Western linguists" maintain "cautious sentiments" regarding the hypothesis, which he described as "the most complex, far-reaching and fully supported of this century".

Robert Drews wrote in 1988 that "most of the chronological and historical arguments seem fragile at best, and of those that I am able to judge, some are evidently wrong". However, he argues that it is far more powerful as a linguistic model, providing insights into the relationship between the Indo-European and the Semitic and Kartvelian languages.

David Anthony in a 2019 analysis also criticizes the "southern" or Armenian hypothesis (replying to Reich, Kristiansen, and Wang). He finds that the Yamnaya derived mainly from Eastern European hunter-gatherers (EHG) and Caucasus hunter-gatherers (CHG), and suggests a genetic and linguistic origin of proto-Indo-Europeans (the Yamnaya) in the Eastern European steppe north of the Caucasus, from a mixture of these two groups. Anthony argues that the roots of proto-Indo-European formed mainly from a base of languages spoken by Eastern European hunter-gatherers, with some influences from the languages of Caucasus hunter-gatherers. According to Anthony, hunting-fishing camps from the lower Volga, dated 6200–4500 BCE, could be the remains of people who contributed the CHG-component, migrating from the south-east Caucasus, who mixed with EHG-people from the north Volga steppes. The resulting culture contributed to the Sredny Stog culture, a predecessor of the Yamnaya culture. Anthony cites evidence from ancient DNA, that the Bronze Age Maykop people of the Caucasus (previously proposed as a possible southern source of language and genetics at the root of Indo-European), had little genetic impact on the Yamnaya (whose paternal lineages differ from those found in Maykop remains, but are instead related to those of pre-Yamnaya Eastern European steppe hunter-gatherers). In addition, the Maykop (and other contemporary Caucasus samples), along with CHG, had significant Anatolian Farmer ancestry "which had spread into the Caucasus from the west after about 5000 BC", but is little detected in the Yamnaya. Partly for these reasons, Anthony concludes that Bronze Age Caucasus groups such as the Maykop "played only a minor role, if any, in the formation of Yamnaya ancestry." According to Anthony, this, the absence of evidence of significant admixture (including of paternal genetic influence, often associated with language shift) from the south on the Yamnaya suggests that the roots of Proto-Indo-European (archaic or proto-proto-Indo-European) were mainly in the steppe rather than the south. Anthony considers it likely that the Maykop spoke a Northern Caucasian language not ancestral to Indo-European.

== See also ==
- Indo-Hittite
- Graeco-Armeno-Aryan

== Sources ==
- Bomhard, Allan (2019), "The Origins of Proto-Indo-European: The Caucasian Substrate Hypothesis", Journal of Indo-European Studies, 47 (1–2)
- Damgaard, Peter de Barros (2018), "The First Horse herders and the Impact of Early Bronze Age Steppe expansions into Asia", Science, 360 (6396) eaar7711, Bibcode:2018Sci...360r7711D, doi:10.1126/science.aar7711, PMC 6748862, PMID 29743352
- Diakonoff, I. M. (1984), The Prehistory of the Armenian People
- Drews, Robert (1988), The Coming of the Greeks, Princeton University Press
- Гамкрелидзе, Т. В.; Иванов, Вяч. Вс. (1984), Индоевропейский язык и индоевропейцы. Реконструкция и историко-типологический анализ праязыка и протокультуры (in Russian), Тбилиси: Издательство Тбилисского университета
- Gamkrelidze, Tamaz V.; Ivanov, V. V. (1990), "The Early History of Indo-European Languages", Scientific American, 262 (3): 110–117, Bibcode:1990SciAm.262c.110G, doi:10.1038/scientificamerican0390-110
- Gamkrelidze, Thomas V.; Ivanov, Vjačeslav V. (1995), Indo-European and the Indo-Europeans: A Reconstruction and Historical Analysis of a Proto-Language and Proto-Culture, Moutin de Gruyter, ISBN 978-3-11-081503-0
- Gamkrelidze, Tamas (2010). "In Defense of Ejectives for Proto-Indo-European" (PDF). Bulletin of the Georgian National Academy of Sciences. 4 (1).
- Grolle, Johann (12 May 2018), "Invasion aus der Steppe", Der Spiegel
- Haak, Wolfgang (2015). "Massive migration from the steppe was a source for Indo-European languages in Europe". Nature. 522 (7555): 207–211. Bibcode:2015Natur.522..207H. bioRxiv 10.1101/013433. doi:10.1038/nature14317. PMC 5048219.
- Haak, W.; Lazaridis, I.; Patterson, N.; Rohland, N.; Mallick, S.; Llamas, B.; Brandt, G.; Nordenfelt, S.; Harney, E.; Stewardson, K.; Fu, Q.; Mittnik, A.; Bánffy, E.; Economou, C.; Francken, M.; Friederich, S.; Pena, R. G.; Hallgren, F.; Khartanovich, V.; Khokhlov, A.; Kunst, M.; Kuznetsov, P.; Meller, H.; Mochalov, O.; Moiseyev, V.; Nicklisch, N.; Pichler, S. L.; Risch, R.; Rojo Guerra, M. A.; et al. (2015a). "Massive migration from the steppe was a source for Indo-European languages in Europe. Supplementary Information". Nature. 522 (7555): 207–211. arXiv:1502.02783. Bibcode:2015Natur.522..207H. doi:10.1038/nature14317. PMC 5048219. PMID 25731166.
- Martiros Kavoukjian, Armenia, Subartu, and Sumer : the Indo-European homeland and ancient Mesopotamia, trans. N. Ouzounian, Montreal (1987), ISBN 0-921885-00-8
- Kozintsev, Alexander (2019), "Proto-Indo-Europeans: The Prologue", Journal of Indo-European Studies, 47 (3–4)
- Kroonen, Guus; Barjamovic, Gojko; Peyrot, Michael (2018), Linguistic supplement to Damgaard et al. 2018: Early Indo-European languages, Anatolian, Tocharian and Indo-Iranian
- Mallory, J.P.; Adams, D.Q. (1997), Encyclopedia of Indo-European Culture, Taylor & Francis
- Mallory, J.P. (2013), "Twenty-first century clouds over Indo-European homelands" (PDF), Journal of Language Relationship, 9: 145–154, doi:10.31826/jlr-2013-090113, S2CID 212689004
- Nichols, Johanna (1997), "The Epicenter of the Indo-European Linguistic Spread", in Blench, Roger; Spriggs, Matthew (eds.), Archaeology and Language I: Theoretical and Methodological Orientations, Routledge
- Nichols, Johanna (1999), "The Eurasian Spread Zone and the Indo-European Dispersal", in Blench, Roger; Spriggs, Matthew (eds.), Archaeology and Language II: Correlating archaeological and Linguistic Hypotheses, Routledge
- Reich, David (2018), Who We Are and How We Got Here: Ancient DNA and the New Science of the Human Past, Knopf Doubleday Publishing Group
- Vybornov, Aleksandr (2016), "Initial stages of two Neolithisation models in the Lower Volga basin", Documenta Praehistorica, 43: 161–166, doi:10.4312/dp.43.7
- Wang, Chuan-Chao (2018), The genetic prehistory of the Greater Caucasus
