= Mount Ararat =

Highest mountain in Turkey

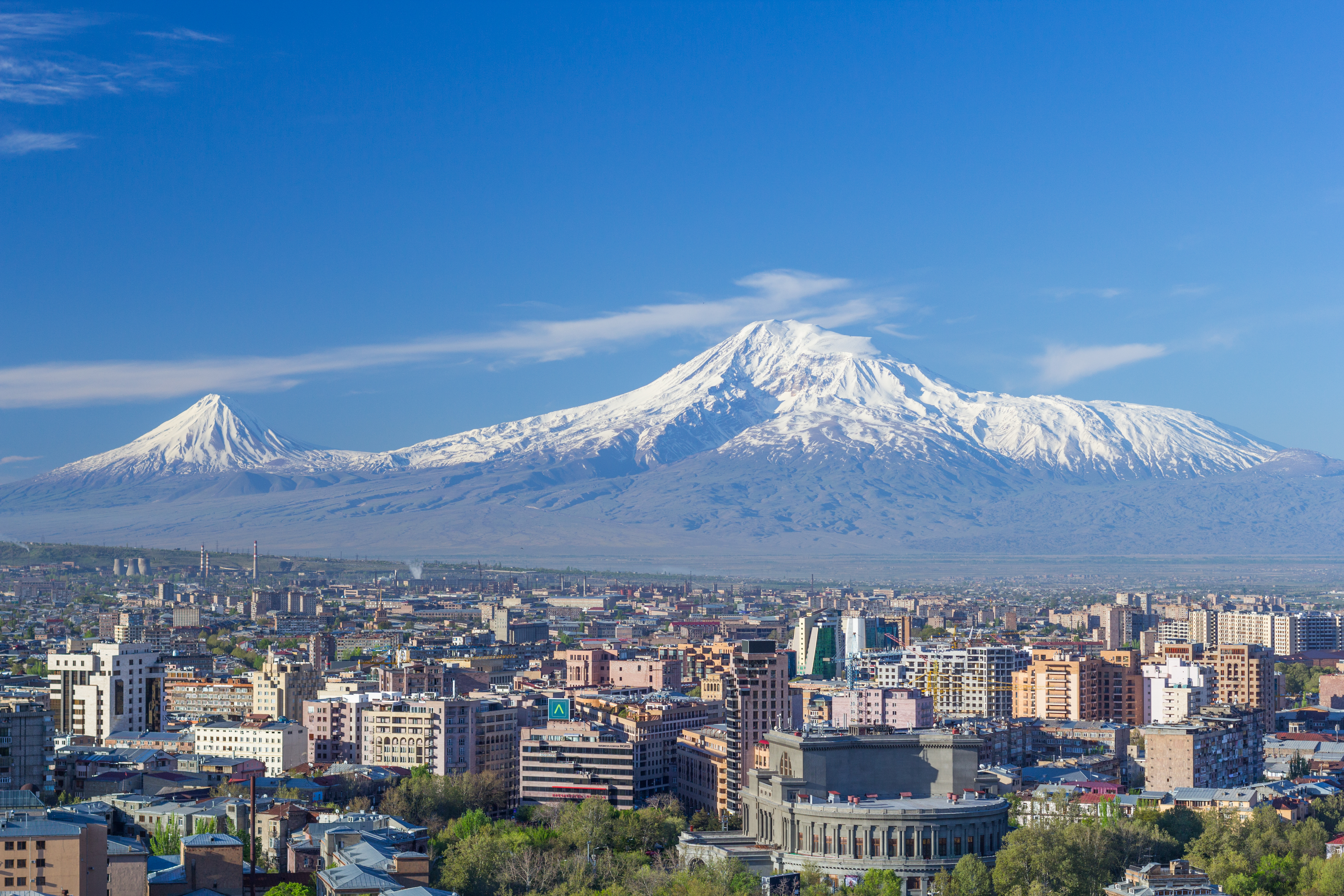
- Little Ararat (left) and Greater Ararat (right); View from Yerevan, Armenia

Highest point
- Elevation: 5,137 m (16,854 ft)
- Prominence: 3,611 m (11,847 ft); Ranked 48th
- Isolation: 379.29 km (235.68 mi)
- Listing: Country high point Ultra; Volcanic Seven Second Summits
- Coordinates: 39°42′07″N 44°17′54″E

Naming
- Native name: Ağrı Dağı (official name) (Turkish); Մասիս (Armenian) (Masis); Çiyayê Agirî (Kurdish)

Geography
- Location within Turkey Location within Caucasus Mountains Location within Near East Location within Europe Location within Earth
- Location: Iğdır and Ağrı provinces, Turkey
- Region: Eastern Anatolia region
- Parent range: Armenian highlands

Geology
- Mountain type: Stratovolcano
- Last eruption: July 2, 1840

Climbing
- First ascent: 9 October [O.S. 27 September] 1829; Friedrich Parrot, Khachatur Abovian, two Russian soldiers, two Armenian villagers

Designations

IUCN Category II (National Park)
- Official name: Ağrı Dağı Milli Parkı
- Designated: 1 November 2004

Mount Ararat, (Note: /ˈærəræt/, ARR-ə-rat; Armenian: Արարատ, romanized: Ararat [ɑɾɑˈɾɑt]) officially Mount Ağrı, (Note: Turkish: Ağrı Dağı; Kurdish: Çiyayê Agirî) also known as Masis, (Note: Armenian: Մասիս [maˈsis]) is a snow-capped and dormant compound volcano and a stratovolcano in easternmost Turkey. It consists of two major volcanic cones: Greater Ararat and Little Ararat. Greater Ararat is the highest peak in Turkey and the Armenian highlands with an elevation of 5,137 m (16,854 ft); Little Ararat's elevation is 3,896 m (12,782 ft). The Ararat massif is about 35 km (22 mi) wide at ground base.

The first recorded efforts to reach Ararat's summit were made in the Middle Ages, and Friedrich Parrot, Khachatur Abovian, and four others made the first recorded ascent in 1829. In Europe, the mountain has been called by the name Ararat since the Middle Ages, as it began to be identified with "mountains of Ararat" described in the Bible as the resting place of Noah's Ark. Although lying outside the borders of modern Armenia, the mountain is the principal national symbol of Armenia and has been considered a sacred mountain by Armenians. It has featured prominently in Armenian literature and art and is an icon of Armenian nationalism. It is depicted on the coat of arms of Armenia along with Noah's Ark.

== Political borders ==
Mount Ararat forms a near-quadripoint between Turkey, Iran, Armenia, and the Nakhchivan exclave of Azerbaijan. The Iran–Turkey boundary skirts east of Lesser Ararat.

From the 16th century until 1828 the range was part of the Ottoman–Persian border; Great Ararat's summit and the northern slopes, along with the eastern slopes of Little Ararat were controlled by Persia. Following the 1826–28 Russo-Persian War and the Treaty of Turkmenchay, the Persian controlled territory was ceded to the Russian Empire. Little Ararat became the point where the Turkish, Persian, and Russian imperial frontiers converged. The current international boundaries were formed throughout the 20th century. The mountain came under Turkish control during the 1920 Turkish invasion of Armenia. It formally became part of Turkey according to the 1921 Treaty of Moscow and Treaty of Kars. In the late 1920s, Turkey crossed the Iranian border and occupied the eastern flank of Lesser Ararat as part of its effort to quash the Kurdish Ararat rebellion, during which the Kurdish rebels used the area as a safe haven against the Turkish state. Iran eventually agreed to cede the area to Turkey in a territorial exchange.

== Names and etymology ==
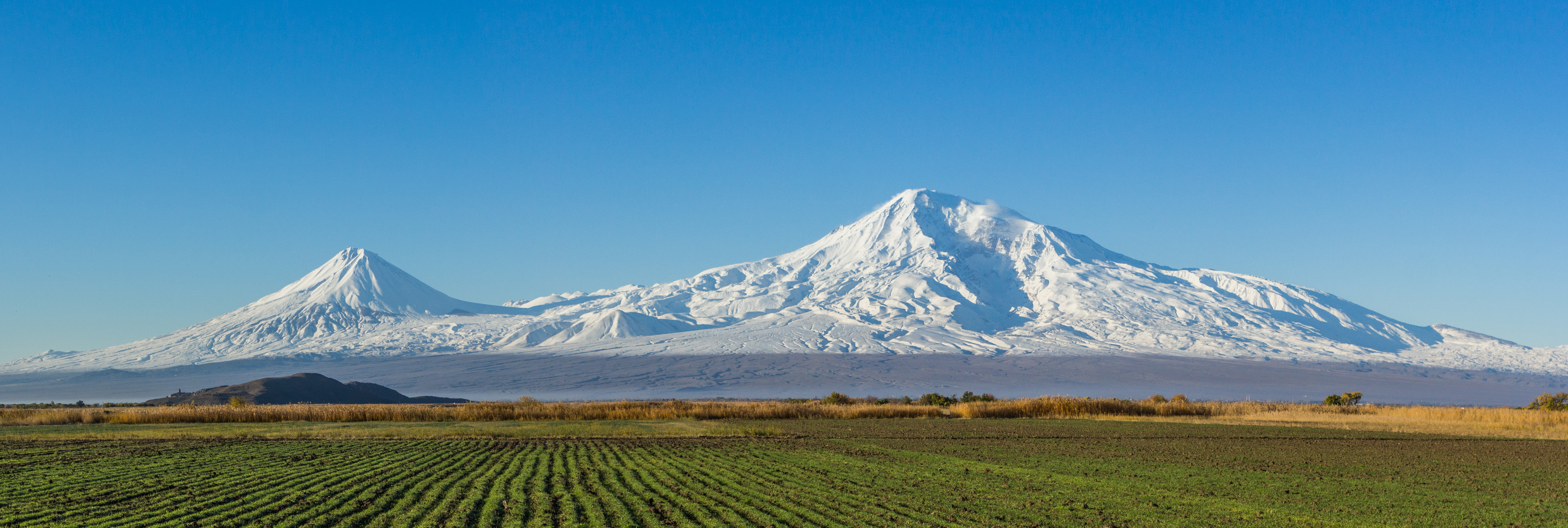
View from the Araratian plain near the city of Artashat, Armenia

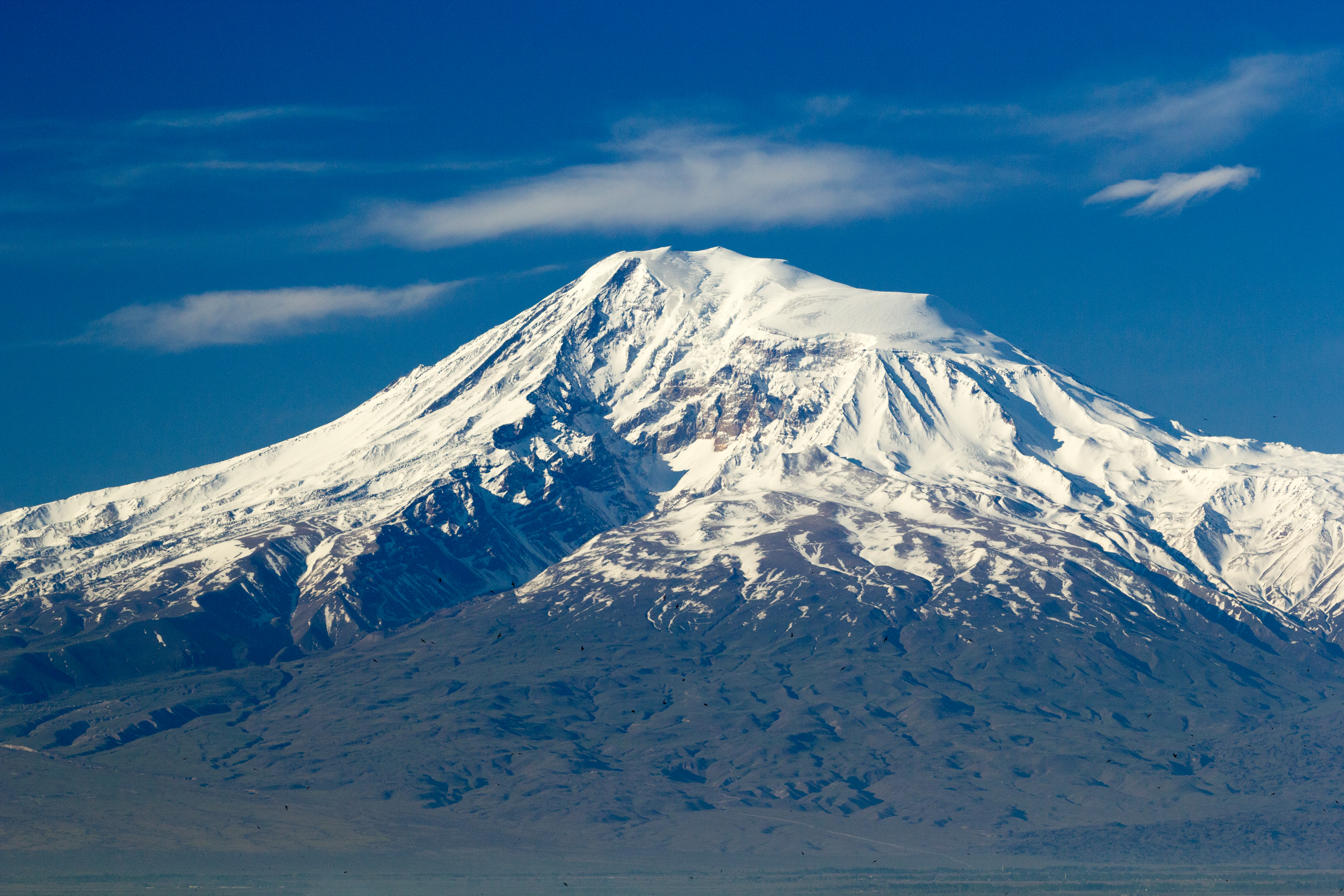
Closeup of Greater Ararat

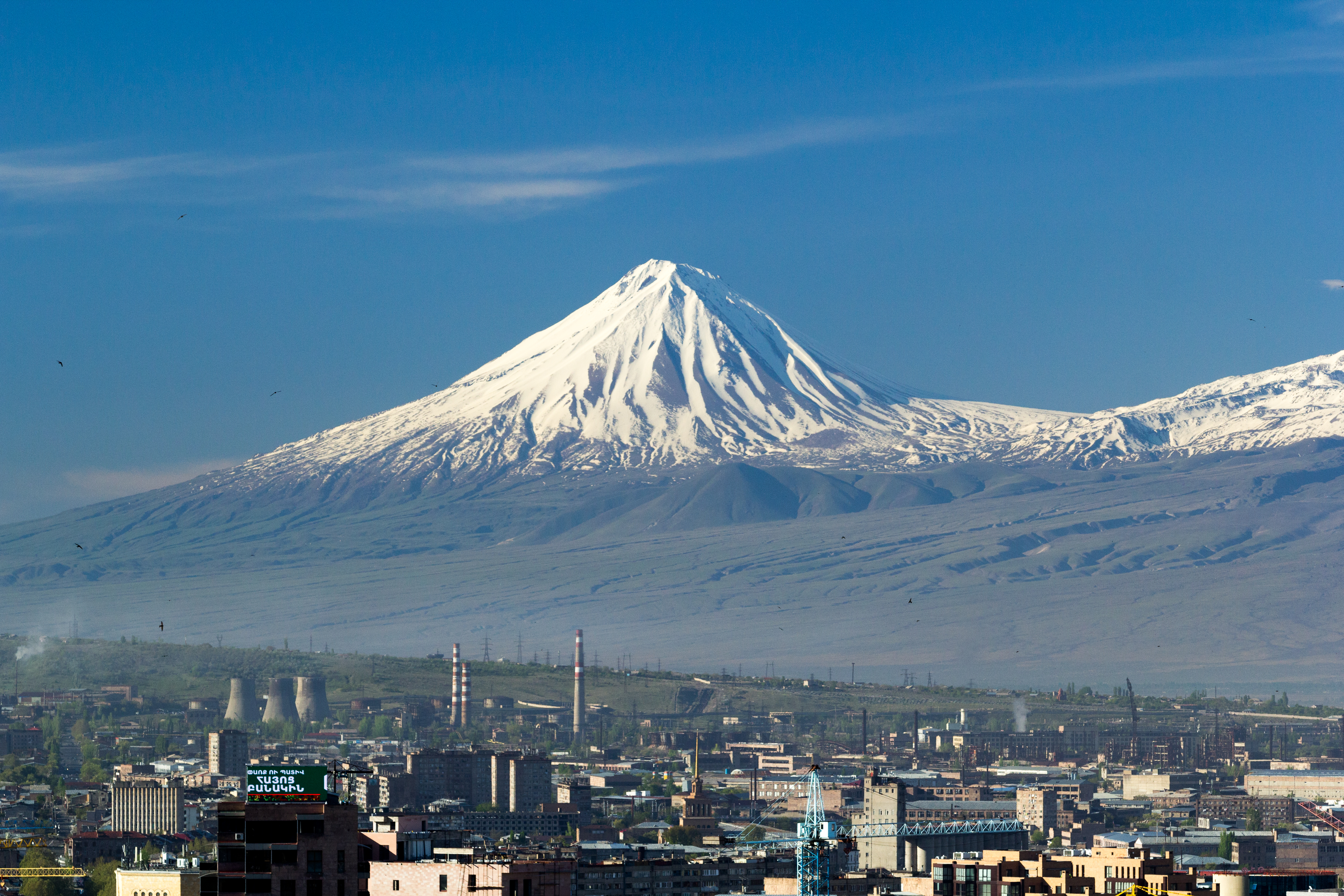
Closeup of Lesser Ararat

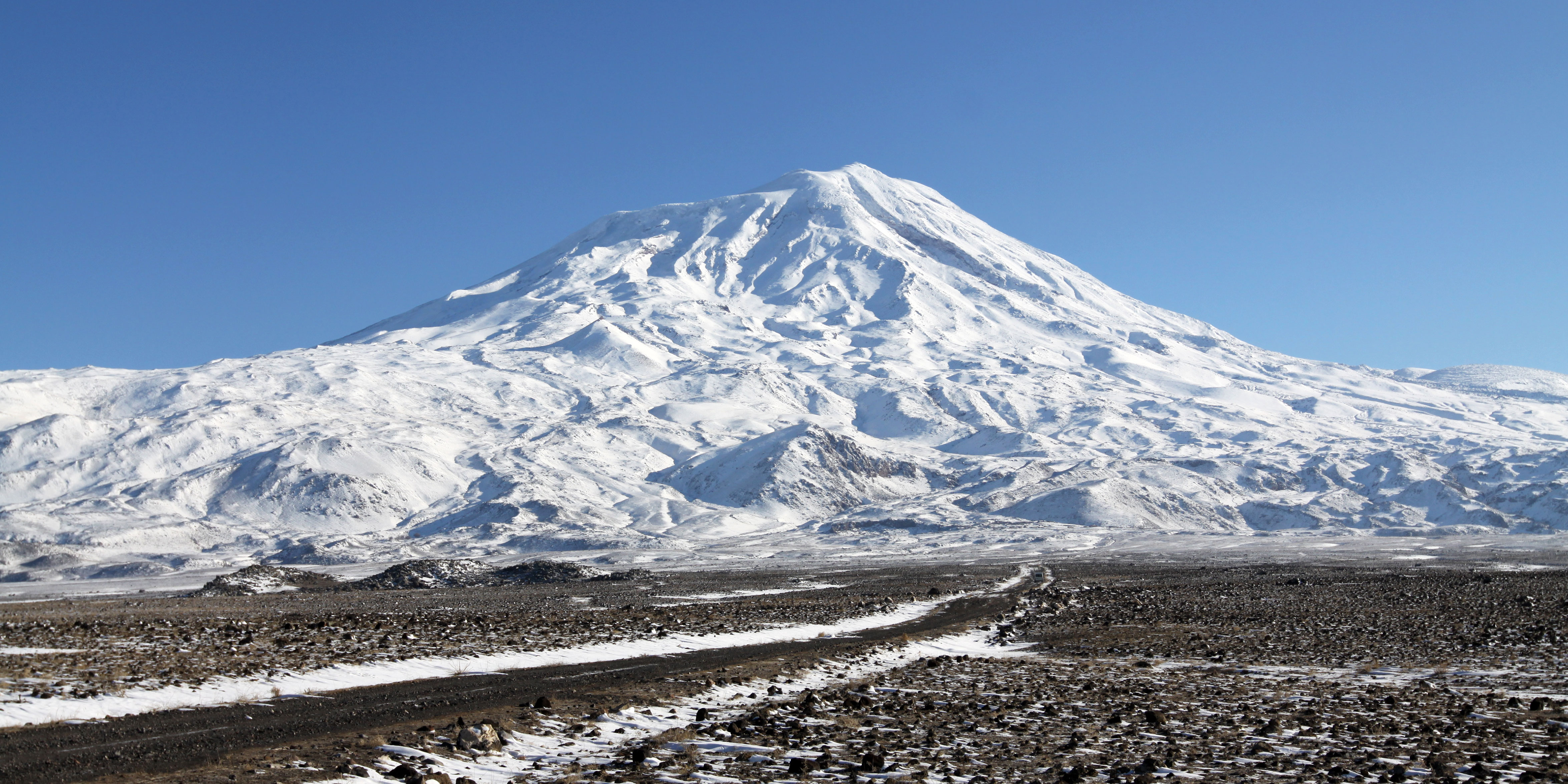
View from Turkey

=== Ararat ===
The mountain was not called by the name Ararat until the Middle Ages; early Armenian historians considered the biblical Ararat to be in Corduene (see Mount Judi). It is known as Ararat in European languages, however, none of the native peoples have traditionally referred to it by that name. Ultimately, Ararat is the Biblical Hebrew rendering of Urartu, (Note: Biblical Hebrew: אררט, ʾrrṭ. Tiberian vocalization אֲרָרָט ʾărārāṭ) the Assyrian and Babylonian exonym for the Iron Age kingdom, a name Archibald Sayce proposed meant "highlands." Ayrarat, the central province of ancient Armenia, shares the same name origin. Robert W. Thomson argued that the mountain came to be called Ararat through confusion with the name of the province.

=== Ağrı and Agirî ===
The Turkish name Mount Ağrı (Ağrı Dağı, [aːɾɯ da.ɯ]), has been known since the late Middle Ages. Ağrı means "pain" or "grief" in Turkish, and the name is translated to "mountain of pain" or "painful mountain", suggestive of the difficulty of its ascent. According to official Turkish sources, it is derived from the earlier name "Ağır Dağ" which translates as "heavy mountain". The Kurdish name of the mountain is Çiyayê Agirî ([t͡ʃɪjaːˈje aːgɪˈriː]), which translates to "fiery mountain". For both Turkish and Kurdish, Sevan Nişanyan suggests an origin from the name of a village on its slopes called Ağori that was decimated after a landslide in 1840. Sargis Petrosyan derives the Turkish name from the Armenian form Armenian *Աղուրի (Aghuri), meaning "a branch used for propagating a vine".

=== Masis ===
The native Armenian name is Masis (Մասիս [maˈsis]). (Note: sometimes spelled Massis) It is derived from Azat Masik’, the classical Armenian name of the greater peak, with azat meaning "high", although it has been translated as "free" or "noble". Masis is the accusative form of Masik’. In modern times, Greater Ararat is known as simply Masis or Մեծ Մասիս (Mets Masis, "Great/Big Masis"), while Lesser Ararat is known as Sis (Սիս) or Փոքր Մասիս (P′ok′r Masis, "Little/Small Masis"). Today, Masis and Ararat (Note: Western Armenian pronunciation: Ararad) are interchangeably used in Armenian. (Note: The peaks are sometimes referred to in plural as Մասիսներ, Masisner.)

The folk etymology recorded in Movses Khorenatsi's History of Armenia derives Masis from king Amasya, the great-grandson of the legendary Armenian patriarch Hayk, who is said to have called it after himself. Several scholarly etymologies have been proposed. Anatoly Novoseltsev suggested that it derives from Middle Persian masist, meaning "the largest". Armen Petrosyan suggested a link to the Māšu (Mashu) mountain mentioned in the Epic of Gilgamesh, pronounced Māsu in Assyrian. Sargis Petrosyan traced the *mas- root to the Proto-Indo-European root *men- "to rise, to be elevated," noting that both the Armenian form *mņ-s- and the form *mņ-t- inherited by other Indo-European languages share this same base.

=== Other names ===
The traditional Persian name is کوه نوح ([ˈkuːhe ˈnuːh], Kūh-e Nūḥ), literally the "mountain of Noah".

In classical antiquity, particularly in Strabo's Geographica, the peaks of Ararat were known in ancient Greek as Ἄβος (Abos) and Νίβαρος (Nibaros). (Note: Strabo, Geographica, XI.14.2 and XI.14.14. They are also transliterated as Abus and Nibarus. Abos and Nibaros are the two peaks of Ararat according to scholars such as Nicholas Adontz, Vladimir Minorsky, Julius Fürst.) Sargis Petrosyan derives Abos from the Indo-European root *auo-, meaning "grandfather" or "elder ancestor" and Nibaros from the IE root *neuəros, meaning "new" or "young," with the suffix *-ro- specifically implies a contrast between two as the newer one.

== Geography ==
Mount Ararat is located in the Eastern Anatolia region of Turkey, between the provinces of Ağrı and Iğdır, near the border with Iran, Armenia and Nakhchivan exclave of Azerbaijan, between the Aras and Murat rivers. The Serdarbulak lava plateau, at 2,600 metres (8,500 ft) of elevation, separates the peaks of Greater and Little Ararat. There are Doğubayazıt Reeds on the western slopes of Mount Ararat. Ararat's summit is located west of the Turkey-Iran border and south of the Turkey-Armenia border. The Ararat plain runs along its northwest to western side.

=== Elevation ===
Ararat is the third most prominent mountain in West Asia behind Elbrus and Damavand.

An elevation of 5,165 m (16,946 ft) for Mount Ararat is given by some encyclopedias and reference works such as Merriam-Webster's Geographical Dictionary and Encyclopedia of World Geography. However, a number of sources, such as the United States Geological Survey and numerous topographic maps indicate that the alternatively widespread figure of 5,137 m (16,854 ft) is probably more accurate. The current elevation may be as low as 5,125 m (16,814 ft) due to the melting of its snow-covered ice cap.

Mount Ararat 3D

=== Summit ice cap ===
The ice cap on the summit of Mount Ararat has been shrinking since at least 1957. In the late 1950s, Blumenthal observed that there existed 11 outlet glaciers emerging from a summit snow mass that covered about 10 km^{2} (3.9 sq mi). At that time, it was found that the present glaciers on the summit of Ararat extend as low as an elevation of 3,900 meters (12,800 ft) on the north-facing slope, and an elevation of 4,200 meters (13,800 ft) on its south-facing slope. Using pre-existing aerial imagery and remote sensing data, Sarıkaya and others studied the extent of the ice cap on Mount Ararat between 1976 and 2011. They discovered that this ice cap had shrunk to 8.0 km^{2} (3.1 sq mi) by 1976 and to 5.7 km^{2} (2.2 sq mi) by 2011. They calculated that between 1976 and 2011, the ice cap on top of Mount Ararat had lost 29% of its total area at an average rate of ice loss of 0.07 km^{2} (0.027 sq mi) per year over 35 years. This rate is consistent with the general rates of retreat of other Turkish summit glaciers and ice caps that have been documented by other studies. According to a 2020 study by Yalcin, "if the glacial withdrawals continue with the same acceleration, the permanent glacier will likely turn into a temporary glacier by 2065."

Blumenthal estimated that the snow line had been as low as 3,000 meters (9,800 ft) in elevation during the Late Pleistocene. Such a snow line would have created an ice cap of 100 km^{2} (39 sq mi) in extent. However, he observed a lack of any clear evidence of prehistoric moraines other than those which were close to the 1958 glacier tongues. Blumenthal explained the absence of such moraines by the lack of confining ridges to control glaciers, insufficient debris load in the ice to form moraines, and their burial by later eruptions. Years later, Birman observed on the south-facing slopes a possible moraine that extends at least 300 meters (980 ft) in altitude below the base of the 1958 ice cap at an elevation of 4,200 meters (13,800 ft). He also found two morainal deposits that were created by a Mount Ararat valley glacier of Pleistocene, possibly in the Last Glacial Period, downvalley from Lake Balık. The higher moraine lies at an altitude of about 2,200 meters (7,200 ft) and the lower moraine lies at an altitude of about 1,800 meters (5,900 ft). The lower moraine occurs about 15 kilometers (9.3 mi) downstream from Lake Balık. Both moraines are about 30 meters (98 ft) high. It is suspected that Lake Balık occupies a glacial basin.

== Geology ==
Mount Ararat is a polygenic, compound stratovolcano. Covering an area of 1,100 km^{2} (420 sq mi), it is the largest volcanic edifice within the region. Along its northwest–southeast trending long axis, Mount Ararat is about 45 kilometers (28 mi) long and is about 30 kilometers (19 mi) long along its short axis. It consists of about 1,150 km^{3} (280 cu mi) of dacitic and rhyolitic pyroclastic debris and dacitic, rhyolitic, and basaltic lavas.

Mount Ararat consists of two distinct volcanic cones, Greater Ararat and Lesser Ararat (Little Ararat). The western volcanic cone, Greater Ararat, is a steep-sided volcanic cone that is larger and higher than the eastern volcanic cone. Greater Ararat is about 25 kilometers (16 mi) wide at the base and rises about 3 kilometers (1.9 mi) above the adjacent floors of the Iğdir and Doğubeyazıt basins. The eastern volcanic cone, Lesser Ararat, is 3,896 meters (12,782 ft) high and 15 kilometers (9.3 mi) across. These volcanic cones, which lie 13 kilometers (8.1 mi) apart, are separated by a wide north–south-trending crack. This crack is the surface expression of an extensional fault. Numerous parasitic cones and lava domes have been built by flank eruptions along this fault and on the flanks of both of the main volcanic cones.

Mount Ararat lies within a complex, sinistral pull-apart basin that originally was a single, continuous depression. The growth of Mount Ararat partitioned this depression into two smaller basins, the Iğdir and Doğubeyazıt basins. This pull-apart basin is the result of strike-slip movement along two en-echelon fault segments, the Doğubeyazıt–Gürbulak and Iğdir Faults, of a sinistral strike–slip fault system. Tension between these faults not only formed the original pull-apart basin, but created a system of faults, exhibiting a horsetail splay pattern, that control the position of the principal volcanic eruption centers of Mount Ararat and the associated linear belt of parasitic volcanic cones. The strike-slip fault system within which Mount Ararat is located is the result of north–south convergence and tectonic compression between the Arabian Platform and Laurasia that continued after the Tethys Ocean closed during the Eocene epoch along the Bitlis–Zagros suture.

=== Geological history ===
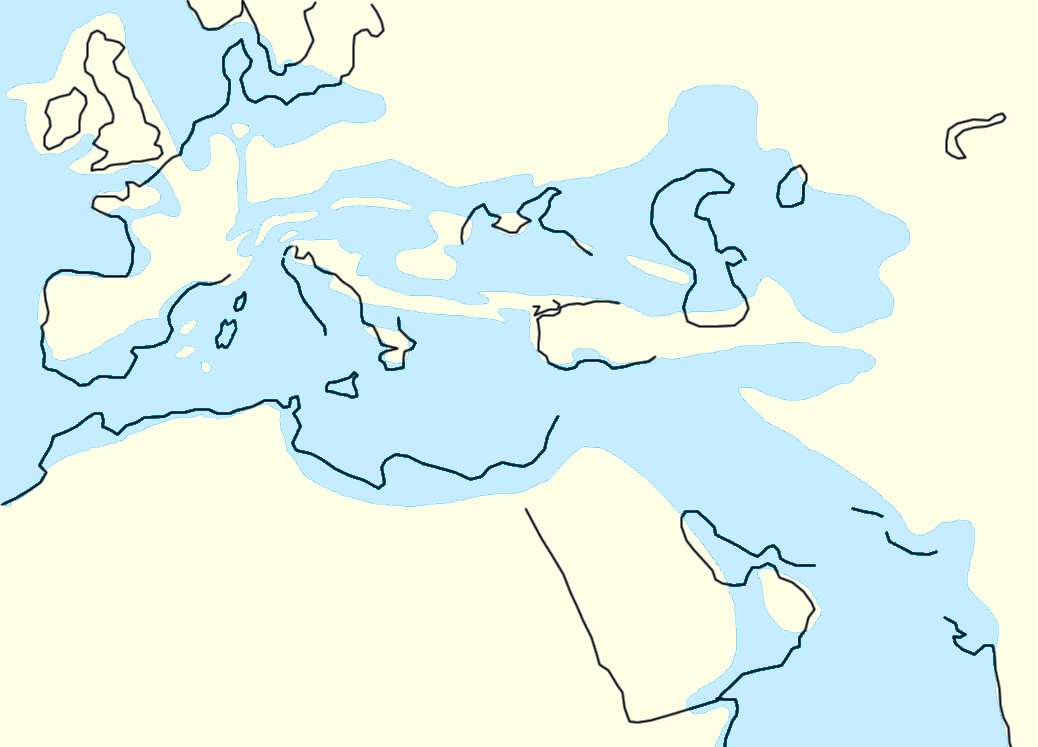
Paleogeography of the early Oligocene

Tectonic map of southern Europe, Mediterranean and the Near East, showing tectonic structures of the western Alpide mountain belt

During the early Eocene and early Miocene, the collision of the Arabian platform with Laurasia closed and eliminated the Tethys Ocean from the area of what is now Anatolia. The closure of these masses of continental crust collapsed this ocean basin by middle Eocene and resulted in a progressive shallowing of the remnant seas, until the end of the early Miocene. Post-collisional tectonic convergence within the collision zone resulted in the total elimination of the remaining seas from East Anatolia at the end of early Miocene, crustal shortening and thickening across the collision zone, and uplift of the East Anatolian–Iranian plateau. Accompanying this uplift was extensive deformation by faulting and folding, which resulted in the creation of numerous local basins. The north–south compressional deformation continues today as evidenced by ongoing faulting, volcanism, and seismicity.

Within Anatolia, regional volcanism started in the middle-late Miocene. During the late Miocene–Pliocene period, widespread volcanism blanketed the entire East Anatolian–Iranian plateau under thick volcanic rocks. This volcanic activity has continued uninterrupted until historical times. Apparently, it reached a climax during the latest Miocene–Pliocene, 6 to 3 Ma. During the Quaternary, the volcanism became restricted to a few local volcanoes such as Mount Ararat. These volcanoes are typically associated with north–south tensional fractures formed by the continuing north–south shortening deformation of Anatolia.

In their detailed study and summary of the Quaternary volcanism of Anatolia, Yilmaz et al. recognized four phases to the construction of Mount Ararat from volcanic rocks exposed in glacial valleys deeply carved into its flanks. First, they recognized a fissure eruption phase of Plinian-subPlinian fissure eruptions that deposited more than 700 meters (2,300 ft) of pyroclastic rocks and a few basaltic lava flows.

These volcanic rocks were erupted from approximately north northwest–south southeast-trending extensional faults and fissures prior to the development of Mount Ararat. Second, a cone-building phase began when the volcanic activity became localized at a point along a fissure. During this phase, the eruption of successive flows of lava up to 150 meters (490 ft) thick and pyroclastic flows of andesite and dacite composition and later eruption of basaltic lava flows, formed the Greater Ararat cone with a low conical profile. Third, during a climatic phase, copious flows of andesitic and basaltic lavas were erupted. During this phase, the current cones of Greater and Lesser Ararat were formed as eruptions along subsidiary fissures and cracks and flank occurred. Finally, the volcanic eruptions at Mount Ararat transitioned into a flank eruption phase, during which a major north–south-trending fault offset the two cones that developed along with a number of subsidiary fissures and cracks on the volcano's flanks.

Along this fault and the subsidiary fissures and cracks, a number of parasitic cones and domes were built by minor eruptions. One subsidiary cone erupted voluminous basalt and andesite lava flows. They flowed across the Doğubeyazıt plain and along the southerly flowing Sarısu River. These lava flows formed black ʻaʻā and pāhoehoe lava flows that contain well preserved lava tubes. The radiometric dating of these lava flows yielded radiometric ages of 0.4, 0.48 and 0.81 Ma. Overall, radiometric ages obtained from the volcanic rocks erupted by Mount Ararat range from 1.5 to 0.02 Ma.

=== Recent volcanic and seismic activity ===
The chronology of Holocene volcanic activity associated with Mount Ararat is documented by either archaeological excavations, oral history, historical records, or a combination of these data, which provide evidence that volcanic eruptions of Mount Ararat occurred in 2500–2400 BC, 550 BC, possibly in 1450 AD and 1783 AD, and definitely in 1840 AD. Archaeological evidence demonstrates that explosive eruptions and pyroclastic flows from the northwest flank of Mount Ararat destroyed and buried at least one Kura–Araxes culture settlement and caused numerous fatalities in 2500–2400 BC. Oral histories indicated that a significant eruption of uncertain magnitude occurred in 550 BC and minor eruptions of uncertain nature might have occurred in 1450 AD and 1783 AD. According to the interpretation of historical and archaeological data, strong earthquakes not associated with volcanic eruptions also occurred in the area of Mount Ararat in 139, 368, 851–893, and 1319 AD. During the 139 AD earthquake, a large landslide that caused many casualties and was similar to the 1840 AD landslide originated from the summit of Mount Ararat.

==== 1840 eruption ====
A phreatic eruption occurred on Mount Ararat on July 2, 1840 and pyroclastic flow from radial fissures on the upper north flank of the mountain and a possibly associated earthquake of magnitude 7.4 that caused severe damage and numerous casualties. Up to 10,000 people died in the earthquake, including 1,900 villagers in the village of Akhuri (Armenian: Akori, modern Yenidoğan) who were killed by a gigantic landslide and subsequent debris flow. In addition, this combination of landslide and debris flow destroyed the Armenian monastery of St. Jacob near Akori, the town of Aralik, several villages, and Russian military barracks. It also temporarily dammed the Sevjur (Metsamor) River.

== Ascents ==
The 13th century missionary William of Rubruck wrote that "Many have tried to climb it, but none has been able."

=== Religious objections ===
The Armenian Apostolic Church was historically opposed to ascents of Ararat on religious grounds. Thomas Stackhouse, an 18th-century English theologian, noted that "All the Armenians are firmly persuaded that Noah's ark exists to the present day on the summit of Mount Ararat, and that in order to preserve it, no person is permitted to approach it." In response to its first ascent by Parrot and Abovian, one high-ranking Armenian Apostolic Church clergyman commented that to climb the sacred mountain was "to tie the womb of the mother of all mankind in a dragonish mode". By contrast, in the 21st century to climb Ararat is "the most highly valued goal of some of the patriotic pilgrimages that are organized in growing number from Armenia and the Armenian diaspora".

=== First ascent ===
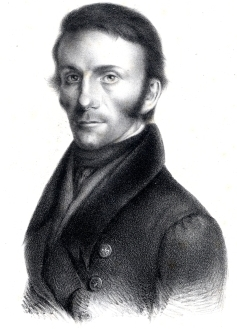
Friedrich Parrot

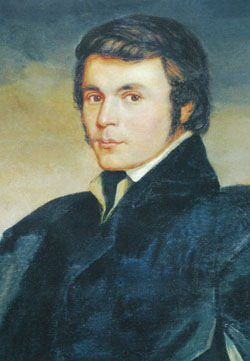
Khachatur Abovian

The first recorded ascent of the mountain in modern times took place on 9 October [O.S. 27 September] 1829. The Baltic German naturalist Friedrich Parrot of the University of Dorpat arrived at Etchmiadzin in mid-September 1829, almost two years after the Russian capture of Yerevan, for the sole purpose of exploring Ararat. The prominent Armenian writer Khachatur Abovian, then a deacon and translator at Etchmiadzin, was assigned by Catholicos Yeprem, the head of the Armenian Church, as interpreter and guide.

Parrot and Abovian crossed the Aras River into the district of Surmalu and headed to the Armenian village of Akhuri on the northern slope of Ararat, 1,220 metres (4,000 ft) above sea level. They set up a base camp at the Armenian monastery of St. Hakob some 730 metres (2,400 ft) higher, at an elevation of 1,943 metres (6,375 ft). After two failed attempts, they reached the summit on their third attempt at 3:15 p.m. on October 9, 1829. The group included Parrot, Abovian, two Russian soldiers – Aleksei Zdorovenko and Matvei Chalpanov – and two Armenian Akhuri villagers – Hovhannes Aivazian and Murad Poghosian. Parrot measured the elevation at 5,250 metres (17,220 ft) using a mercury barometer. This was not only the first recorded ascent of Ararat, but also the second highest elevation climbed by man up to that date outside of Mount Licancabur in the Chilean Andes. Abovian dug a hole in the ice and erected a wooden cross facing north. Abovian also picked up a chunk of ice from the summit and carried it down with him in a bottle, considering the water holy. On 8 November [O.S. 27 October] 1829, Parrot and Abovian together with the Akhuri hunter Sahak's brother Hako, acting as a guide, climbed up Lesser Ararat.

=== Later notable ascents ===
Other early notable climbers of Ararat included Russian climatologist and meteorologist Kozma Spassky-Avtonomov (August 1834), Karl Behrens (1835), German mineralogist and geologist Otto Wilhelm Hermann von Abich (29 July 1845), British politician Henry Danby Seymour (1848) and British army officer Major Robert Stuart (1856). Later in the 19th century, two British politicians and scholars—James Bryce (1876) and H. F. B. Lynch (1893)—climbed the mountain. The first winter climb was by Turkish alpinist Bozkurt Ergör, the former president of the Turkish Mountaineering Federation, who climbed the peak on 21 February 1970.

== Resting-place of Noah's Ark ==
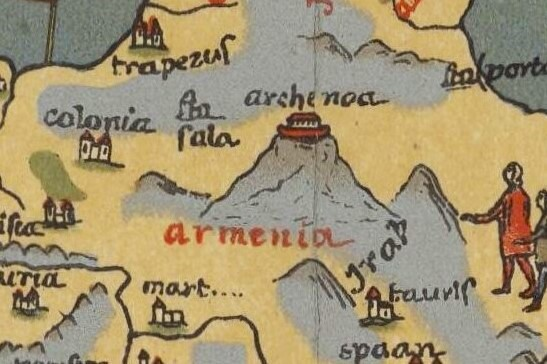
Ararat and Noah's ark on the Erdapfel by Martin Behaim, c. 1490.

=== Origin of the tradition ===
According to the Book of Genesis of the Old Testament, Noah's Ark landed on the "mountains of Ararat". Historians and Bible scholars generally agree that "Ararat" is the Hebrew name of Urartu, the geographical predecessor of Armenia; they argue that the word referred to the wider region at the time and not specifically to Mount Ararat. (Note: Richard James Fischer: "The Genesis text, using the plural 'mountains' (or hills), identifies no particular mountain, but points generally toward Armenia ('Ararat' being identical with the Assyrian 'Urartu') which is broadly embraces [sic] that region."; Exell, Joseph S.; Spence-Jones, Henry Donald Maurice (eds.). "Genesis". The Pulpit Commentary. "It is agreed by all that the term Ararat describes a region." view online; Dummelow, John, ed. (1909). "Genesis". John Dummelow's Commentary on the Bible. "Ararat is the Assyrian 'Urardhu,' the country round Lake Van, in what is now called Armenia ... and perhaps it is a general expression for the hilly country which lay to the N. of Assyria. Mt. Masis, now called Mt. Ararat (a peak 17,000 ft. high), is not meant here." view online; Bill T. Arnold: "Since the ancient kingdom of Ararat/Urartu was much more extensive geographically than this isolated location in Armenia, modern attempts to find remaints of Noah's ark here are misguided."; Vahan Kurkjian: "It has long been the notion among many Christians that Noah's Ark came to rest as the Flood subsided upon the great peak known as Mount Ararat; this assumption is based upon an erroneous reading of the 4th verse of the VIIIth chapter of Genesis. That verse does not say that the Ark landed upon Mount Ararat, but upon 'the mountains of Ararat.' Now, Ararat was the Hebrew version of the name, not of the mountain but of the country around it, the old Armenian homeland, whose name at other times and in other tongues appears variously as Erirath, Urartu, etc.") The phrase is translated as "mountains of Armenia" (montes Armeniae) in the Vulgate. Nevertheless, Ararat is traditionally considered the resting-place of Noah's Ark, and, thus, regarded as a biblical mountain.

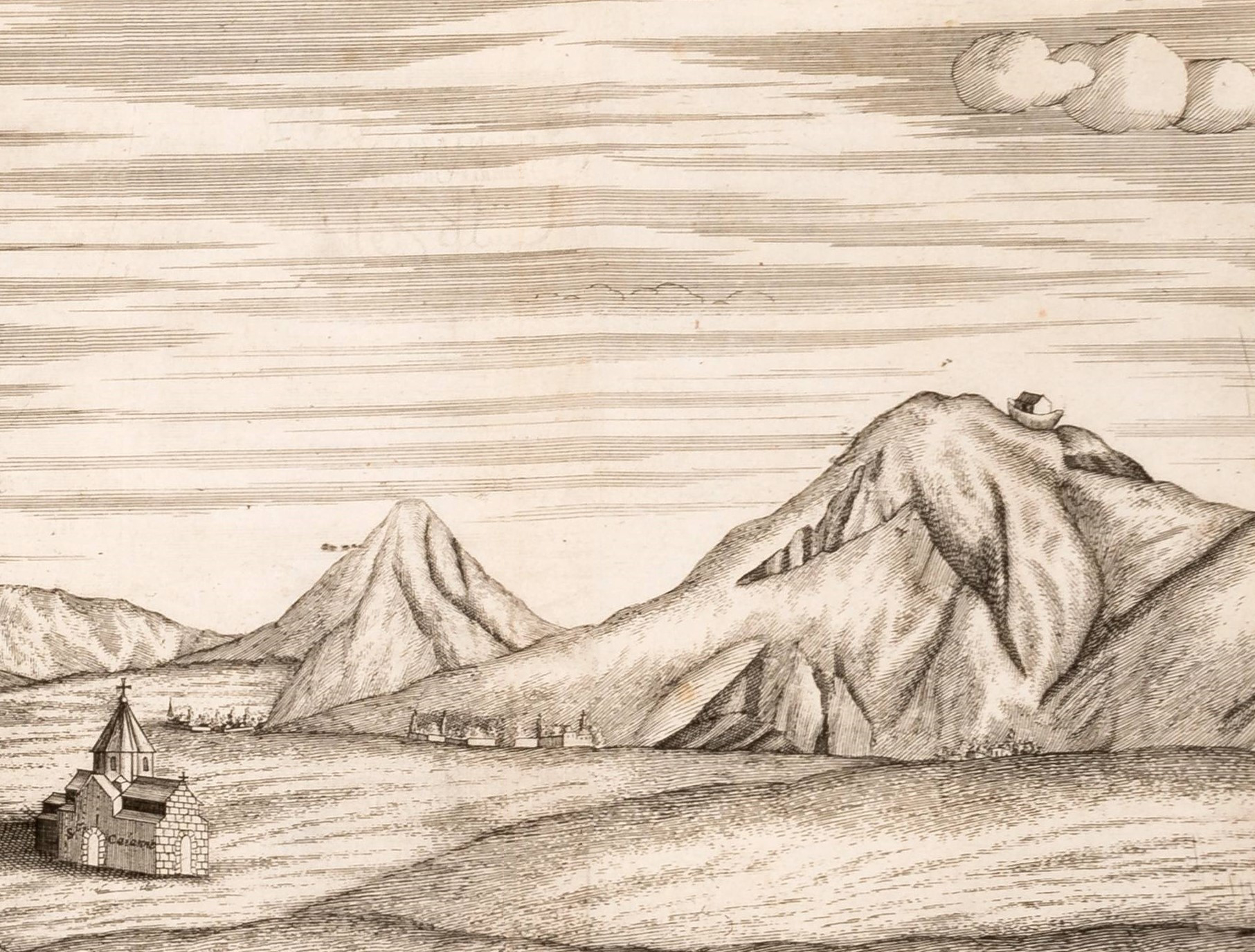
Ararat with Noah's Ark and Saint Gayane Church on Jean Chardin's engraving of Etchmiadzin (1686). (Note: It was created by Guillaume-Joseph Grelot, according to a 2024 book by Asoghik Karapetian, director of the Etchmiadzin Museums. See still (4:55–5:01) from the book launch. See also 1811 version (full engraving).)

Mount Ararat has been associated with the Genesis account since the 11th century, and Armenians began to identify it as the ark's landing place during that time. The ark on Ararat was often depicted in mappae mundi as early as the 11th century. (Note: Notable examples: the Anglo-Saxon mappa mundi (the Cotton map or Cottoniana, c. 1025‒50), the Ebstorf Map (c. 1240), the Chronica Majora (c. 1240–1253) (image); the Psalter world map (c. 1260), the Hereford Mappa Mundi (c. 1300), the Angelino Dulcert (1339), the Catalan Atlas (c. 1375) (image); the Fra Mauro map (c. 1450), the Erdapfel (c. 1490, Martin Waldseemüller's Carta marina (1516).; Also: Arca Noë (1675) by Athanasius Kircher (Topography of Paradise, detail).; 1749 etching in The Universal Magazine (image, detail))

F. C. Conybeare wrote that the mountain was "a center and focus of pagan myths and cults… and it was only in the eleventh century, after these had vanished from the popular mind, that the Armenian theologians ventured to locate on its eternal snows the resting-place of Noah's ark". William of Rubruck is usually considered the earliest reference for the tradition of Mount Ararat as the landing place of the ark in European literature. John Mandeville is another early author who mentioned Mount Ararat, "where Noah's ship rested, and it is still there". (Note: Isidore of Seville (Etymologiae 14.3.35), Marco Polo, Pierre d'Ailly, and Odoric of Pordenone mention that Noah’s Ark can be found on "some mountains in Armenia, but they do not give the mountains’ name.")

=== Prevalence of the tradition ===
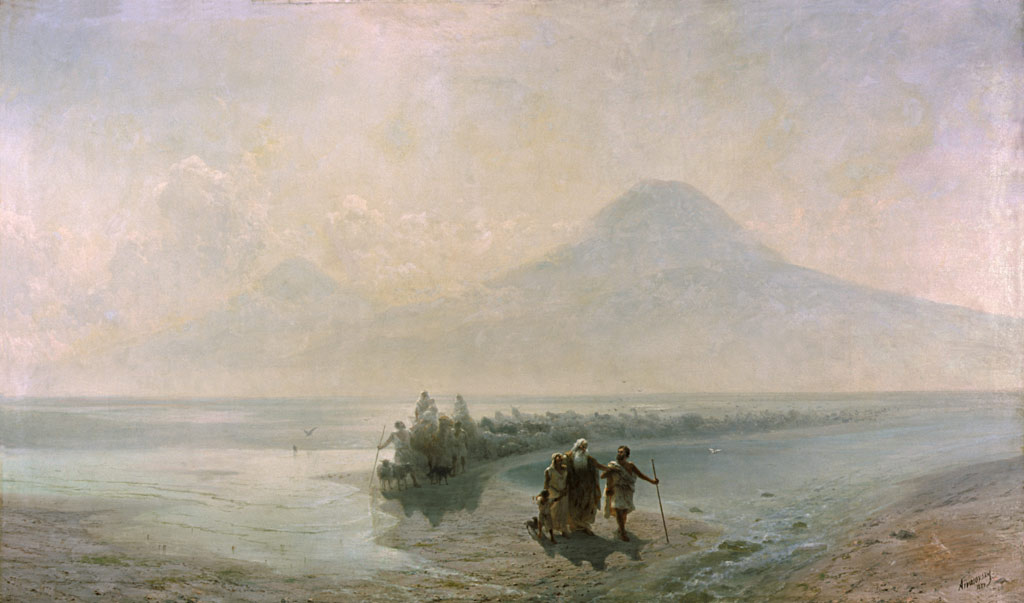
Descent of Noah from Ararat by Ivan Aivazovsky (1889, National Gallery of Armenia) depicts Noah with his family and a procession of animals crossing the Ararat plain, following their descent from Mount Ararat, which is seen in the background.

Most Christians, including most of Western Christianity, identify Mount Ararat with the biblical mountains of Ararat "largely because it would have been the first peak to emerge from the receding flood waters". (Note: A 1722 biblical dictionary by Austin Calmet and the 1871 Jamieson-Fausset-Brown Bible Commentary both point to Ararat as the place where the ark rested.) H. G. O. Dwight wrote in 1856 that it is "the general opinion of the learned in Europe" that the Ark landed on Ararat. James Bryce wrote that the ark rested upon a "mountain in the district which the Hebrews knew as Ararat, or Armenia" in an 1878 article for the Royal Geographical Society, and he added that the biblical writer must have had Mount Ararat in mind because it is so "very much higher, more conspicuous, and more majestic than any other summit in Armenia".

In 2001 Pope John Paul II declared in his homily in Yerevan's St. Gregory the Illuminator Cathedral: "We are close to Mount Ararat, where tradition says that the Ark of Noah came to rest." Patriarch Kirill of Moscow also mentioned it as the ark's resting place in his speech at Etchmiadzin Cathedral in 2010.

Those critical of this claim point out that Ararat was the name of the country at the time when Genesis was written, not specifically the mountain. Arnold wrote in his 2008 Genesis commentary, "The location 'on the mountains' of Ararat indicates not a specific mountain by that name, but rather the mountainous region of the land of Ararat".

=== Searches ===
Ararat has traditionally been the main focus of the searches for Noah's Ark. Augustin Calmet wrote in his 1722 biblical dictionary: "It is affirmed, but without proof, that there are still remains of Noah's ark on the top of this mountain; but M. de Tournefort, who visited this spot, has assured us there was nothing like it; that the top of mount Ararat is inaccessible, both by reason of its great height, and of the snow which perpetually covers it." Archaeological expeditions, sometimes supported by evangelical and millenarian churches, have been conducted since the 19th century in search of the ark. According to a 1974 book, around 200 people from more than 20 countries claimed to have seen the Ark on Ararat since 1856. A fragment from the ark supposedly found on Ararat is on display at the museum of Etchmiadzin Cathedral, the center of the Armenian Church. Despite numerous reports of ark sightings (e.g. Ararat anomaly) and rumors, "no scientific evidence of the ark has emerged". Searches for Noah's Ark are considered by scholars an example of pseudoarchaeology.

Several significant attempts to locate the Ark have also taken place at the Durupinar site in the Ararat region where a seemingly boat shaped rock formation was discovered. Details about this formation can be found on the Durupınar site page.

== Significance for Armenians ==
=== Symbolism ===
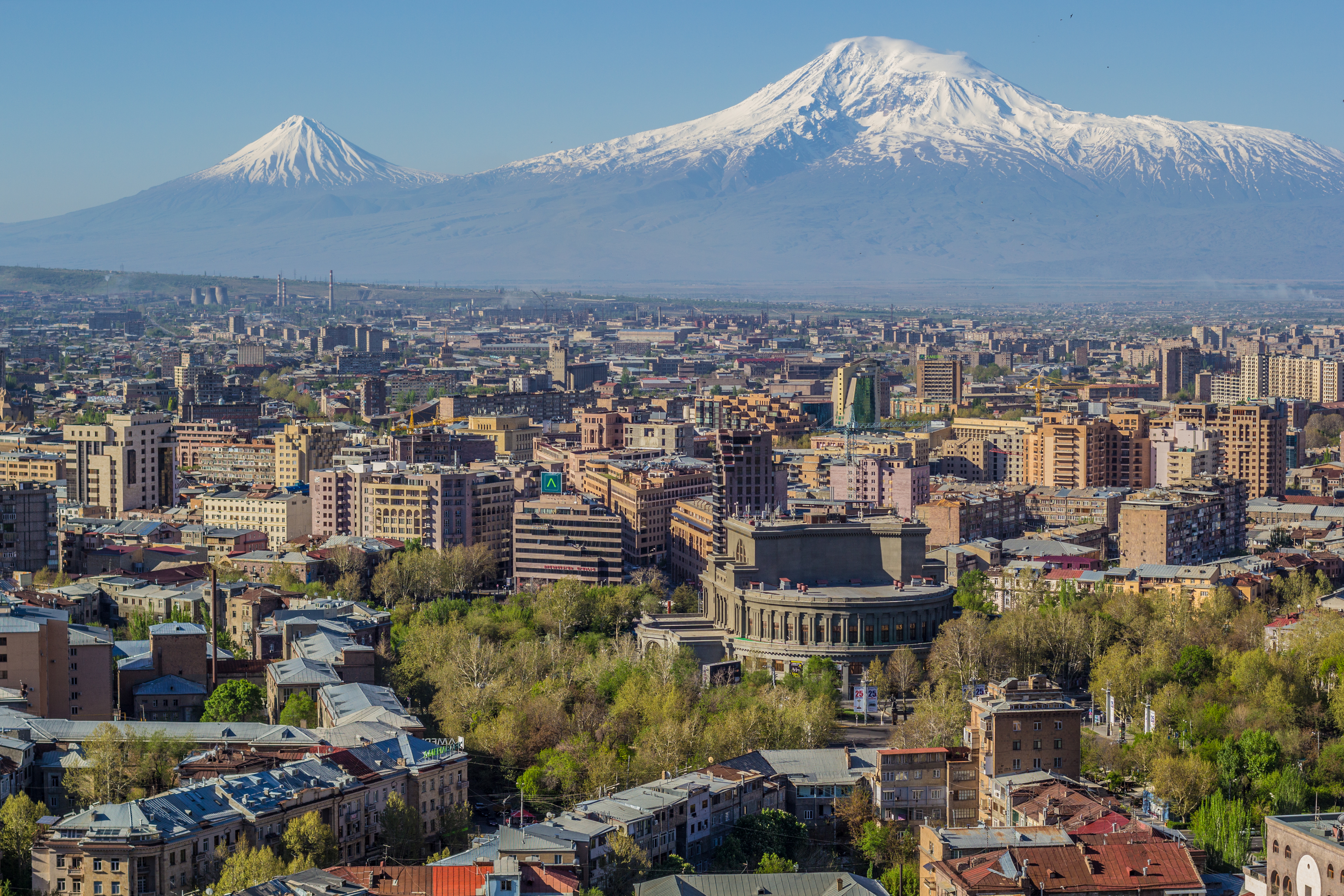
Ararat—located some 65 km (40 mi) south of the city–dominates the skyline of Armenia's capital Yerevan.

Despite lying outside the borders of modern Armenia, Ararat has historically been associated with Armenia. (Note: Armenians have been called the "people of Ararat".) It is widely considered the country's principal national symbol. The image of Ararat, usually framed within a nationalizing discourse, is ubiquitous in everyday material culture in Armenia, with Armenians having "a sense of possession of Ararat in the sense of symbolic cultural property". In a 2024 poll in Armenia, 86% of respondents said they experience strong emotions when seeing the mountain.

There is historical and modern mountain worship around it among Armenians. Ararat is known as the "holy mountain" of the Armenian people. Ararat stands at the geographical center of the Armenian highlands and was the center of the Kingdom of Armenia in antiquity. (Note: "...Mt. Ararat, which was the geographical center of the ancient Armenian kingdoms..." "The sacred mountain stands in the center of historical and traditional Armenia..." "To the Armenians it is the ancient sanctuary of their faith, the centre of their once famous kingdom, hallowed by a thousand traditions." One scholar defined the historic Greater Armenia as "the area about 200 miles (320 km) in every direction from Mount Ararat".) Theodore Edward Dowling wrote that Ararat and Etchmiadzin are the "two great objects of Armenian veneration", while Jonathan Smele called Ararat and the medieval capital of Ani the "most cherished symbols of Armenian identity". In the 19th-century era of romantic nationalism, when an Armenian state did not exist, Ararat symbolized the historical Armenian nation-state. (Note: In 1861 Armenian poet Mikael Nalbandian, witnessing the Italian unification, wrote to Harutiun Svadjian in a letter from Naples: "Etna and Vesuvius are still smoking; is there no fire left in the old volcano of Ararat?")

=== Pre-Christian tradition ===
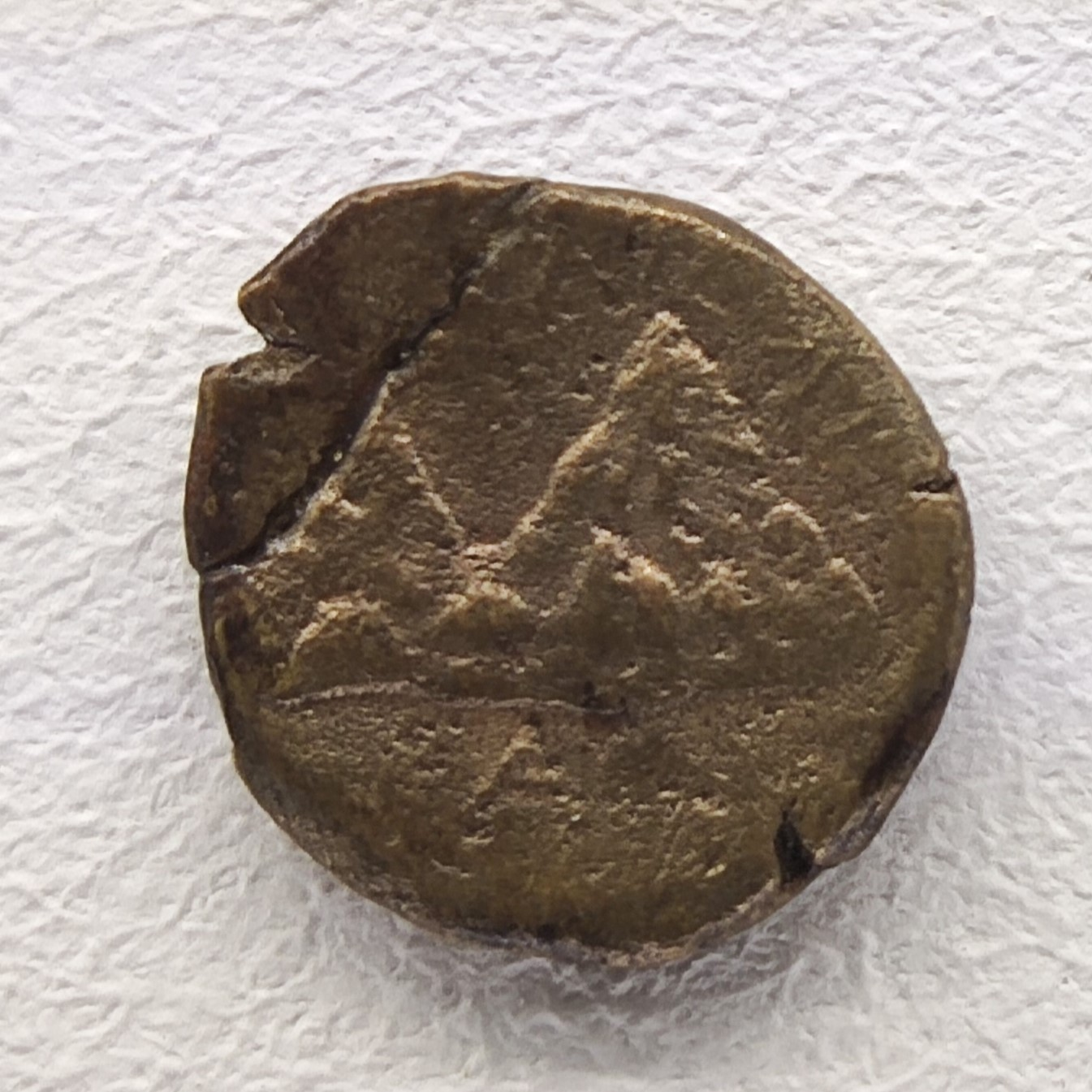
Ararat on the reverse of a coin of the co-rulers of Armenia Tigranes IV and Erato from 2 BC–AD 1.

In pre-Christian Armenian mythology, where Zoroastrianism dominated, mountains such as Ararat were sacred. Folk tradition said vishaps, dragon-like mythological creatures, residing in Ararat and Aragats engage in combat every two years, "perhaps inspired by the traditional rivalry thought to exist between the two volcanic peaks themselves."

In the Armenian mythological tradition recorded by Movses Khorenatsi, the Artaxiad King Artavazd II (r. 55–34 BC) was cursed by his father, Artaxias I, to be seized by the supernatural creatures k‘ajk‘ ("brave ones") to be confined in a cave on the heights of Mount Ararat. There, he remains bound with iron chains, guarded by two dogs who "eternally lick... his bonds" in an attempt to free him. To prevent his release, which folklore suggests would result in the "destruction" or "complete transformation of the world", Armenian blacksmiths traditionally struck their anvils on the first day of the week or during the festival of Navasard to symbolically strengthen the chains. In later Christian re-interpretations, Artavazd's role shifted from a potential "redeemer" to a demonic figure akin to the Iranian Aži Dahāka. Nina Garsoïan suggests that the legend "partly confused" the historical Artavazd with his treacherous brother Tigranes the Younger and may reflect the memory of the capture and imprisonment of Artavazd in Egypt by Mark Antony. The legend persisted "well into early modern times".

The mountain appears on copper coinage of the Artaxiad kings of Armenia. A coin of Artaxias I depicts an eagle perched on a mountain, likely Ararat overlooking Artaxata. A small coin attributed to Tigranes II (though possibly a jugate issue) shows two peaks without an eagle, the left peak being lower. Above them is a partial inscription that may reflect the Armenian word sar ("mountain"). The twin peaks are depicted on coins minted by the co-rulers Tigranes IV and Erato from 2 BC–AD 1, who reigned as clients of Rome. A "crudely drawn" twin-peaked Ararat appears on a coin attributed to King Tiridates II (r. 217–252) of the later Arsacid dynasty.

=== Myth of origin ===
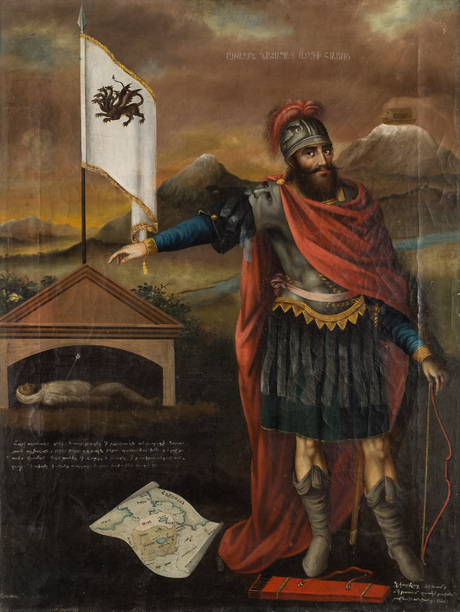
Hayk, the legendary founding father (patriarch) of the Armenian people, as depicted by Mkrtum Hovnatanian (1779–1846). Ararat is pictured in the background.

The Ararat area is one of the two loci of legendary origin in Armenian tradition, along with that of Van, specifically the Hayots Dzor region. The Genesis flood narrative was linked to the Armenian myth of origin by the early medieval historian Movses Khorenatsi. In his History of Armenia, he wrote that Noah and his family first settled in Armenia and later moved to Babylon. Hayk, a descendant of Japheth, a son of Noah, revolted against Bel (the biblical Nimrod) and returned to the area around Mount Ararat, where he established the roots of the Armenian nation. He is thus considered the legendary founding father (patriarch) and the name giver of the Armenian people. According to Razmik Panossian, this legend "makes Armenia the cradle of all civilisation since Noah's Ark landed on the 'Armenian' mountain of Ararat. [...] it connects Armenians to the biblical narrative of human development. [...] it makes Mount Ararat the national symbol of all Armenians, and the territory around it the Armenian homeland from time immemorial."

=== Coat of arms of Armenia ===
Mount Ararat has been depicted on the coat of arms of Armenia consistently since 1918. The First Republic's coat of arms was designed by architect Alexander Tamanian and painter Hakob Kojoyan. This coat of arms was readopted by the legislature of the Republic of Armenia on April 19, 1992, after Armenia regained its independence. Mount Ararat is depicted along with the ark on its peak on the shield on an orange background. The emblem of the Armenian Soviet Socialist Republic (Soviet Armenia) was created by the painters Martiros Saryan and Hakob Kojoyan in 1921. Mount Ararat is depicted in the center and makes up a large portion of it.

According to an account (anecdote) widely reported since the 1920s, Turkey (Note: Variously identified as Turkish ambassador, Turkish Foreign Minister, or İsmet İnönü (Ismet Pasha).) raised the issue (Note: At Lausanne Conference of 1922–1923 according to an early source.) of Ararat being on Soviet Armenia's coat of arms with the Soviet Union. The Soviet response, attributed to Foreign Commissar Georgy Chicherin, pointed out that Turkey's flag features a crescent moon despite Turkey not owning the moon. Later sources described it as likely apocryphal. The account is mentioned in the memoirs of Nikita Khrushchev.

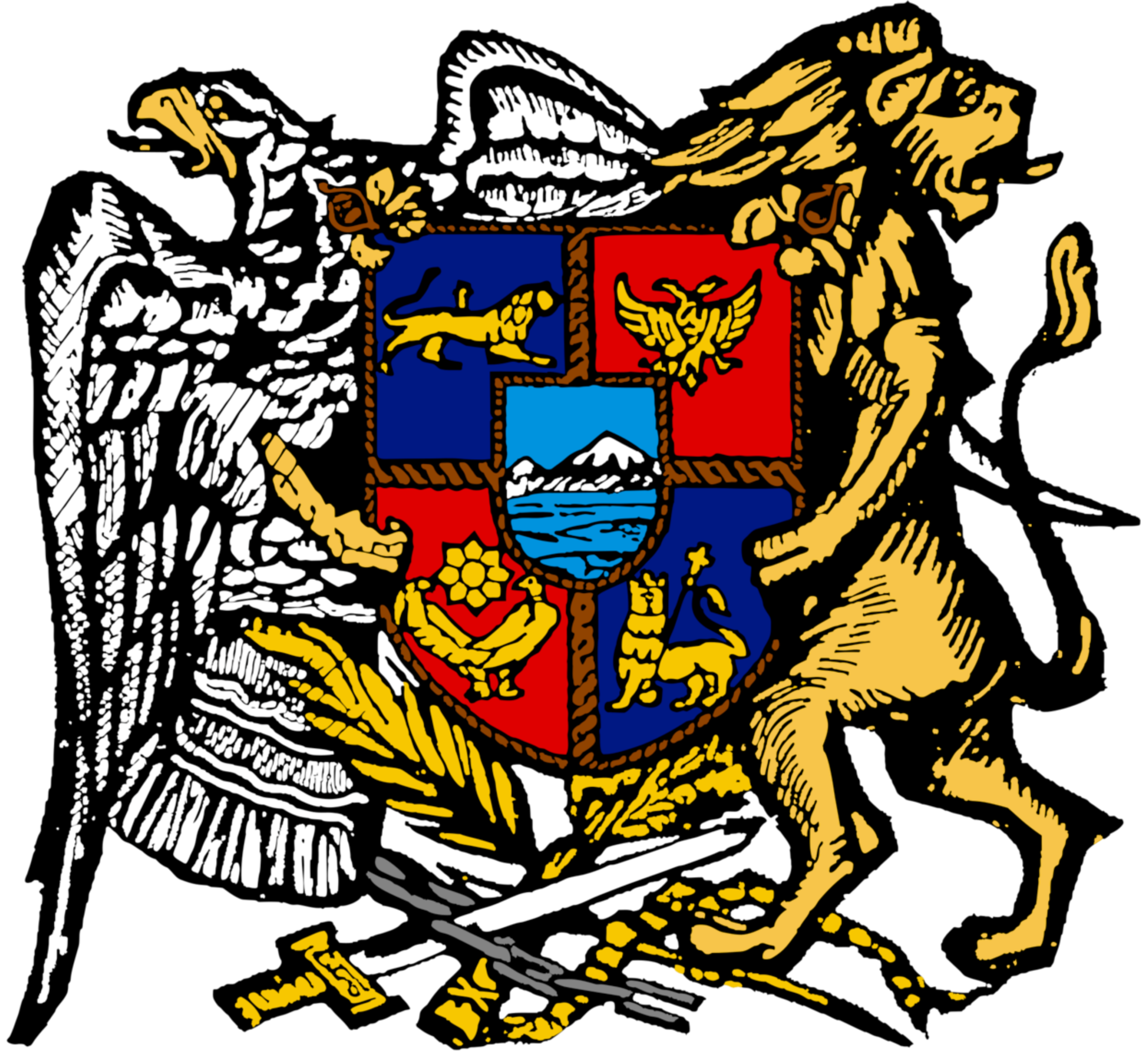
First Republic (1918–1920)

Soviet Republic (1921–91)

Current Republic (1992–)

It is also depicted on the emblem and flag of Yerevan since 2004. It is portrayed on the breast of a lion along with the Armenian eternity sign. The mountain appears on the emblem of the Armenian Apostolic Church's Araratian and Masyatsotn dioceses, and the Armenian Catholic Church's Ordinariate of Armenia and Eastern Europe.

Ararat appeared on the coat of arms of the Armenian Oblast and the Georgia-Imeretia Governorate (image), subdivisions of the Russian Empire that included the northern flanks of the mountain. They were adopted in 1833 and 1843, respectively.

=== Symbol of genocide and territorial claims ===
In the aftermath of the Armenian genocide of 1915, Mount Ararat became a symbol in Armenian national consciousness, representing both the destruction of Armenian communities in eastern Turkey (Western Armenia) and aspirations for lost homeland. (Note: "The lands of Western Armenia which Mt. Ararat represent..." "mount Ararat is the symbol of banal irredentism for the territories of Western Armenia") The mountain features prominently in diaspora Armenian homes as a "bittersweet reminder of homeland and national aspirations." Ararat symbolizes Armenian claims to "lost lands". Adriaans noted that Ararat is featured as a sanctified territory for the Armenians in everyday banal irredentism.

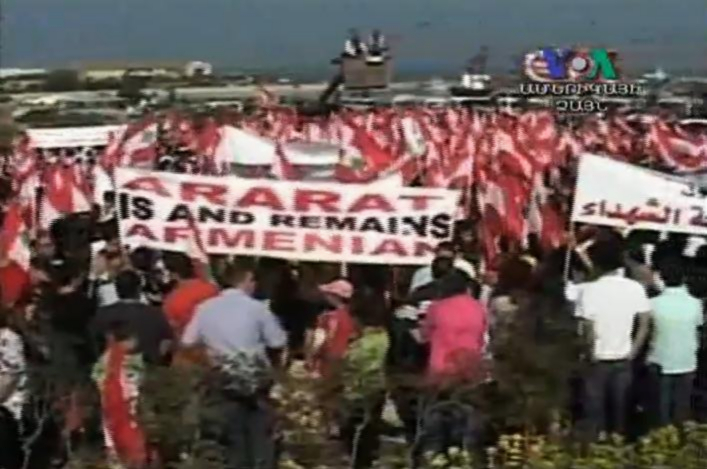
Lebanese Armenians protesting Turkish Prime Minister Erdoğan's visit to Beirut in November 2010. The poster reads "Ararat is and remains Armenian".

Turkish analysts argue that regular references to the Armenian Genocide and Mount Ararat "clearly indicate" that the border with Turkey is contested in Armenia. Since independence from the Soviet Union in 1991, the Armenian government has not made official claims to any Turkish territory, however the Armenian government has avoided "an explicit and formal recognition of the existing Turkish-Armenian border". In a 2010 interview with Der Spiegel, Armenian President Serzh Sargsyan was asked whether Armenia wants "Mount Ararat back". Sargsyan, in response, said that "No one can take Mount Ararat from us; we keep it in our hearts. Wherever Armenians live in the world today, you will find a picture of Mount Ararat in their homes. And I feel certain that a time will come when Mount Ararat is no longer a symbol of the separation between our peoples, but an emblem of understanding. But let me make this clear: Never has a representative of Armenia made territorial demands. Turkey alleges this—perhaps out of its own bad conscience?"

The most prominent party to lay claims to eastern Turkey is the nationalist Armenian Revolutionary Federation (Dashnaktsutyun). which claims it as part of what it considers United Armenia. In various settings, several notable individuals such as German historian Tessa Hofmann, Slovak conservative politician František Mikloško, Lithuanian political scientist and Soviet dissident Aleksandras Štromas have spoken in support of Armenian claims over Mt. Ararat.

In 1975, the Soviet Komsomol secretary Iasha Bablian in Nagorno-Karabakh publicly recited a poem about the separation of Mount Ararat from the Armenian people. It was treated as a nationalist provocation; Bablian was dismissed from his job and forced to leave Nagorno-Karabakh, and purges of Armenian intellectuals followed soon afterward.

== Cultural significance and depictions ==
Western travelers have long been impressed by the mountain. Douglas Freshfield, who climbed its summit, opined that "no single mountain we know presented such a magnificent and impressive appearance as the Armenian Giant." Archibald Geikie wrote that "men who have seen much of mountains in many countries speak of it as the noblest mass among them all." William Hamilton found it "rising in majestic and solitary grandeur." Mabel Evelyn Elliott wrote that its "vastness and silence ... reduces all human things to their proportions in the universe." John Buchan Telfer found it a "peerless among the mighty works of the Creator." Henri Hyvernat described it as "doubtless the most celebrated of mountains in the history of the human race."

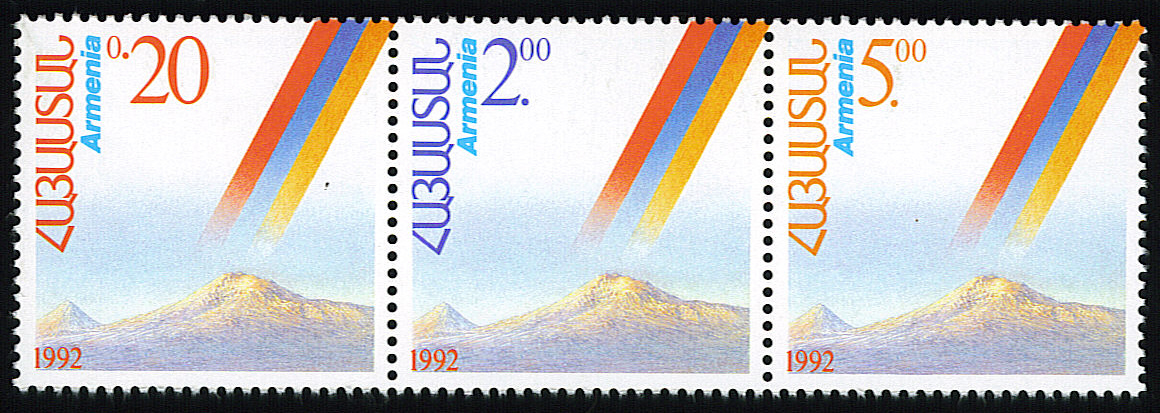
The first stamps issued by independent Armenia in 1992

Levon Abrahamian noted that Ararat is visually present for Armenians in reality (it can be seen from many houses in Yerevan and settlements in the Ararat plain), symbolically (through many visual representations, such as on Armenia's coats of arms), and culturally—in numerous and various nostalgic poetical, political, architectural representation. Hotels in Yerevan often advertise the visibility of Ararat from their rooms, which is seen as a major advantage for tourists.

The first three postage stamps issued by Armenia in 1992 after achieving independence from the Soviet Union depicted Mount Ararat. Mount Ararat has been depicted on five Armenian dram banknotes issued sice 1993. (Note: Central Bank of Armenia banknotes: 10 dram (1993–2004) 100 dram (1993–2004) 500 dram (1993–2005) 50,000 dram (2001–) 50,000 dram (2018–)) It was also depicted on the reverse of the 100 Turkish lira banknotes of 1972–1986. (Note: Central Bank of the Republic of Turkey. Banknote Museum: 6. Emission Group – One Hundred Turkish Lira – I. Series, II. Series & III. Series.) It is depicted on the logo of Armenia's leading university, the Yerevan State University, and the logo of Armavia, Armenia's now defunct flag carrier.

=== In visual art ===
Armenian

The first Armenian artist to depict the mountain was Ivan Aivazovsky, who created a painting of Ararat during his visit to Armenia in 1868. However, a late 17th century map by Eremia Chelebi, an Ottoman Armenian, depicting Ararat was later discovered. Other Armenians artists have also painted Ararat, including Yeghishe Tadevosyan, Gevorg Bashinjaghian, Martiros Saryan, and Panos Terlemezian.

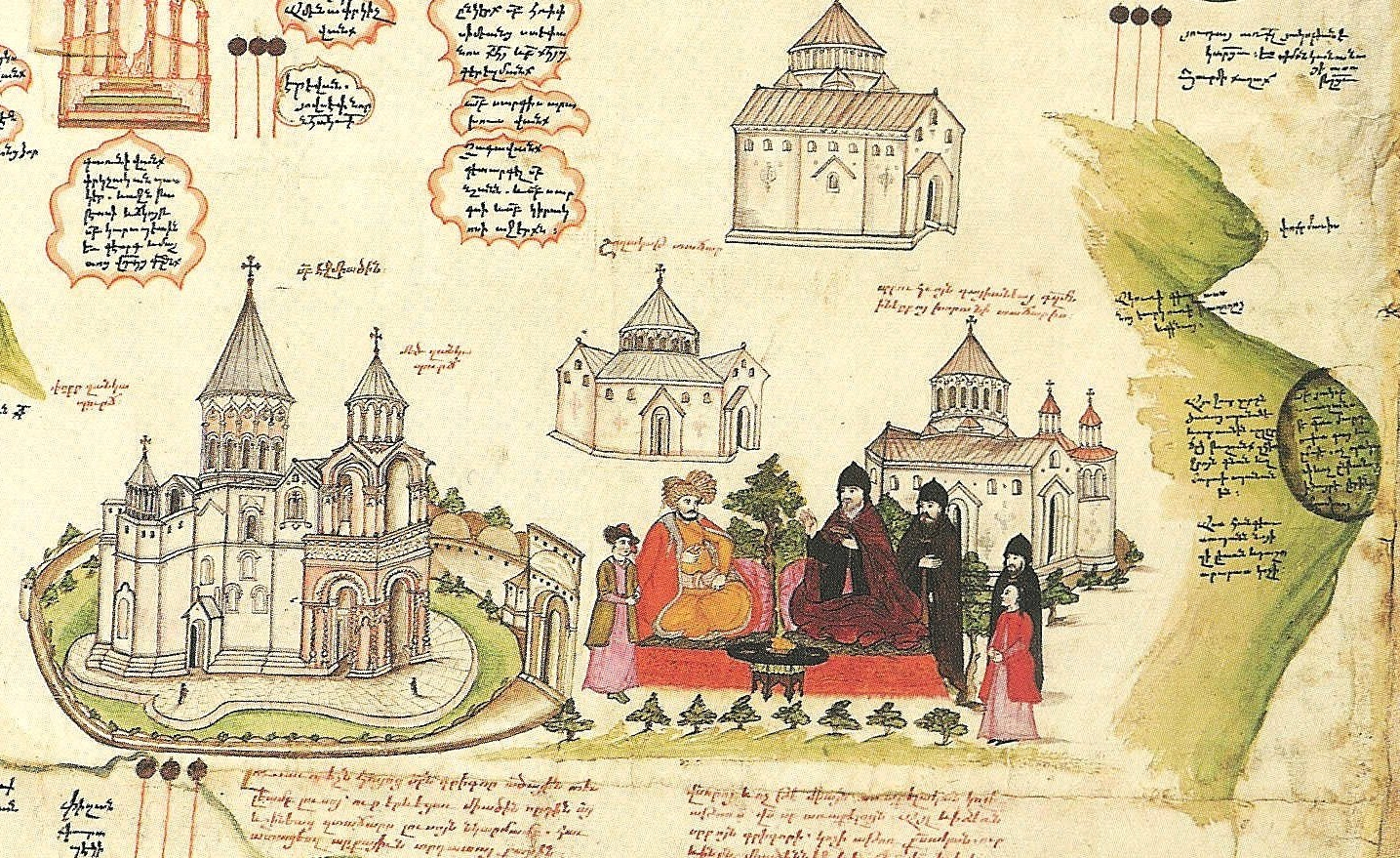
Ararat depicted vertically (right) on a 1691 map by Eremya Çelebi along with Etchmiadzin Cathedral and other churches of Vagharshapat.

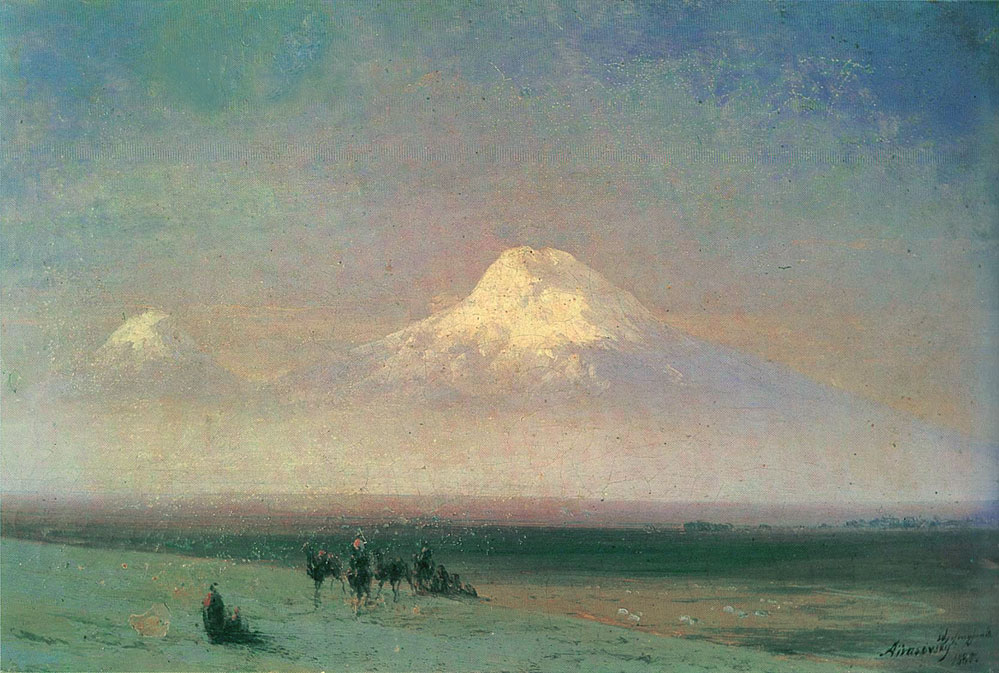
Ivan Aivazovsky, Valley of Mount Ararat, 1882

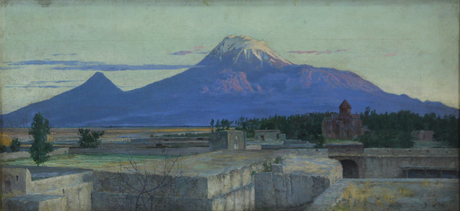
Yeghishe Tadevosyan, Ararat from Ejmiatsin, 1895

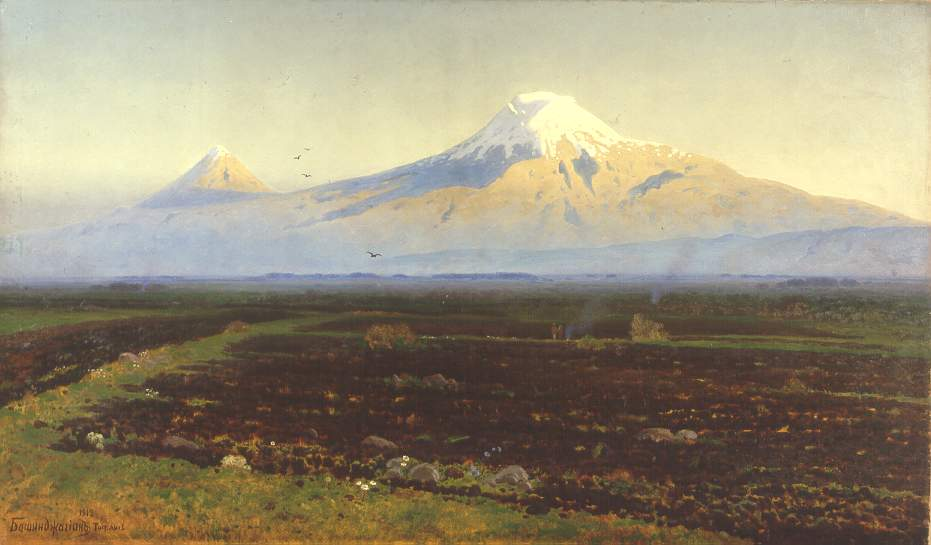
Gevorg Bashinjaghian, 1912

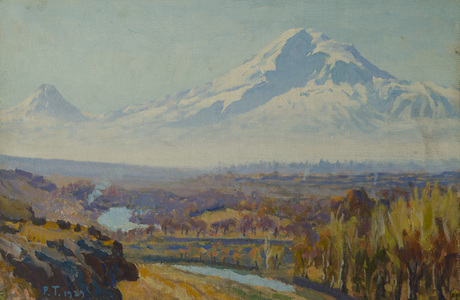
Panos Terlemezian, 1929

Ararat was depicted by non-Armenians, often in the books of European travelers in the 18th–19th centuries who visited Armenia.

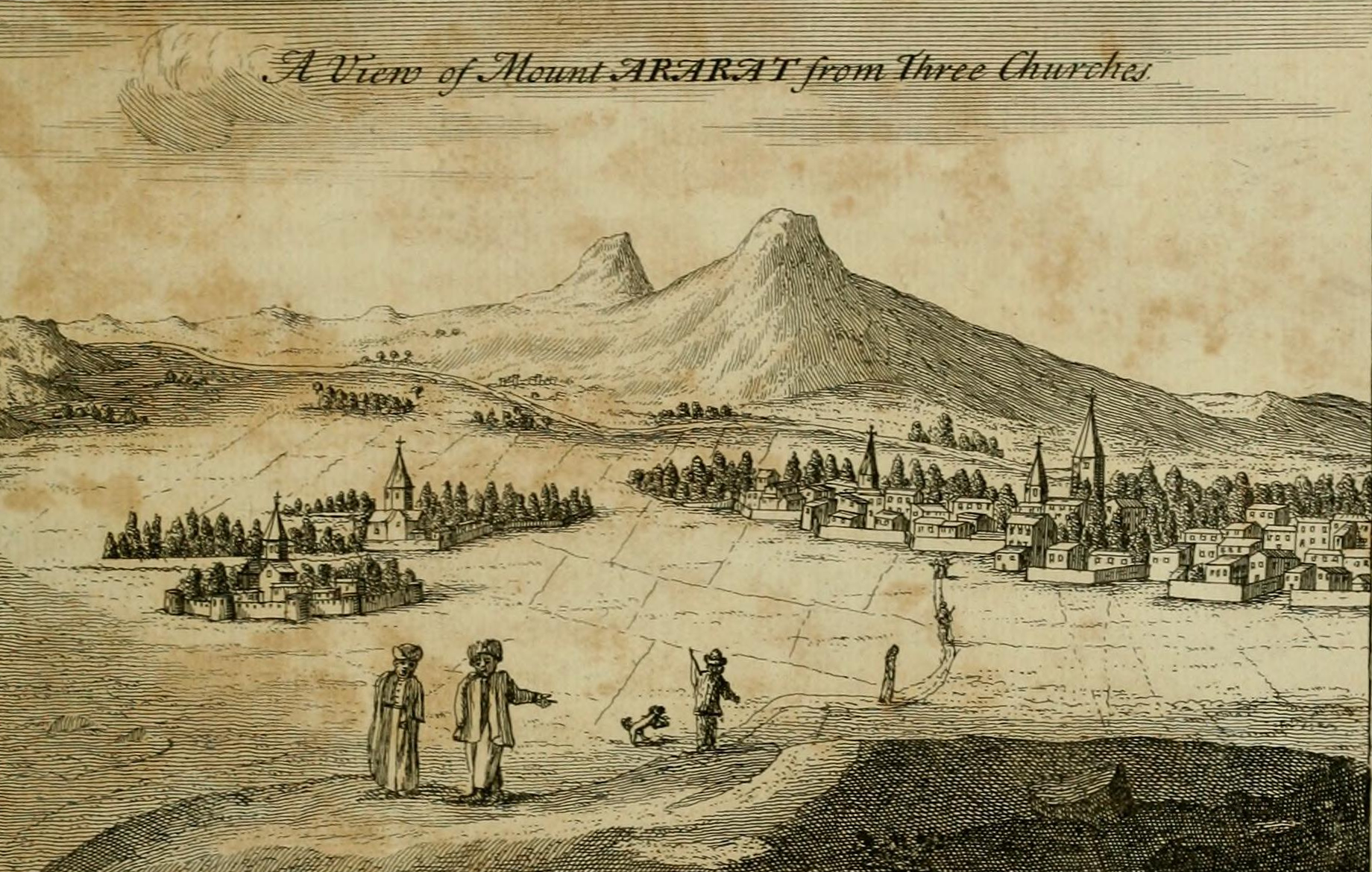
Joseph Pitton de Tournefort, 1718

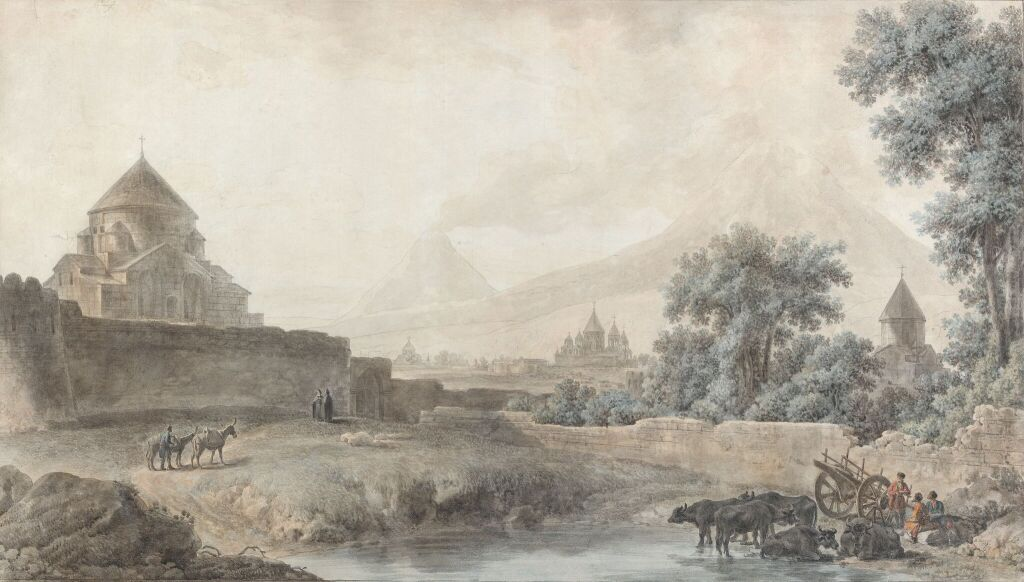
A 1783 watercolor of the churches of Etchmiadzin with Ararat by Mikhail Matveevich Ivanov. (Note: Ivan Aivazovsky subsequently offered his version based on Ivanov's original.)

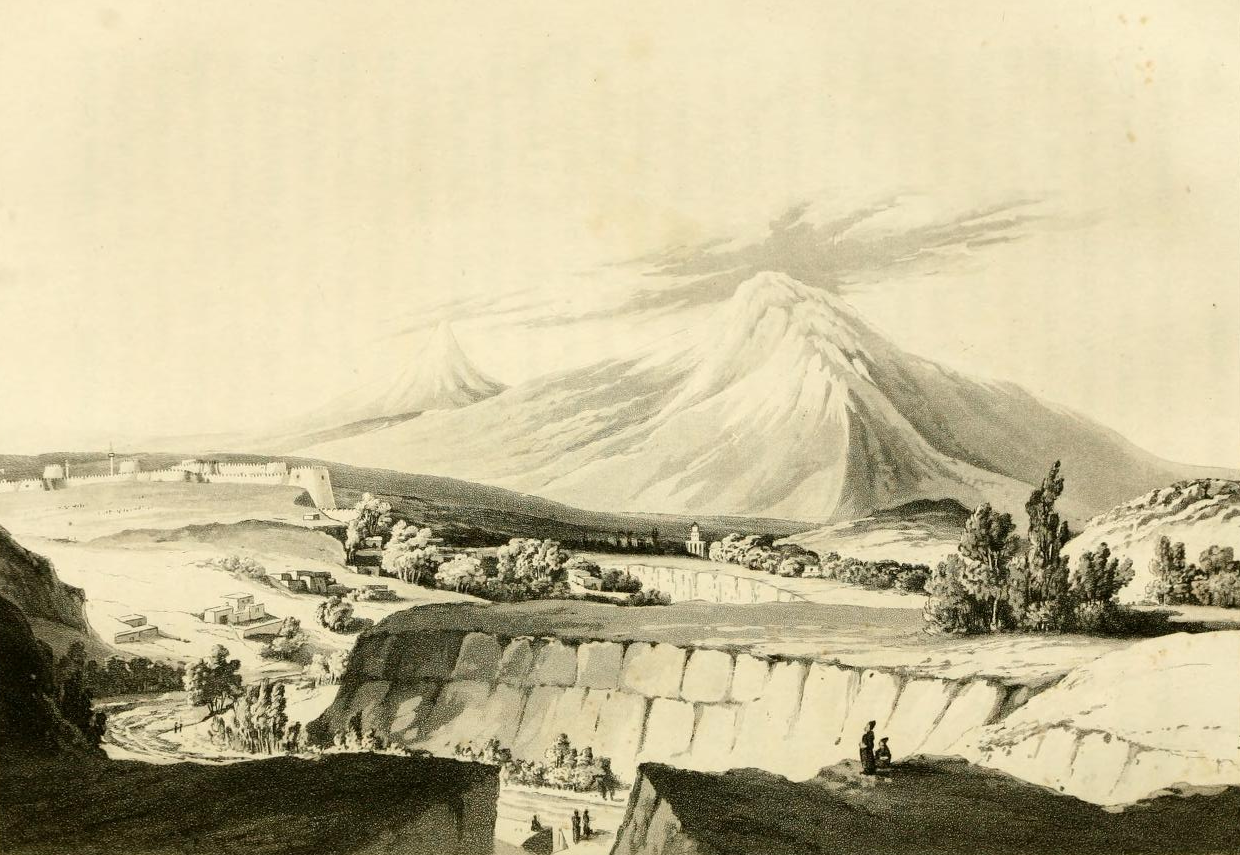
Robert Ker Porter, 1821

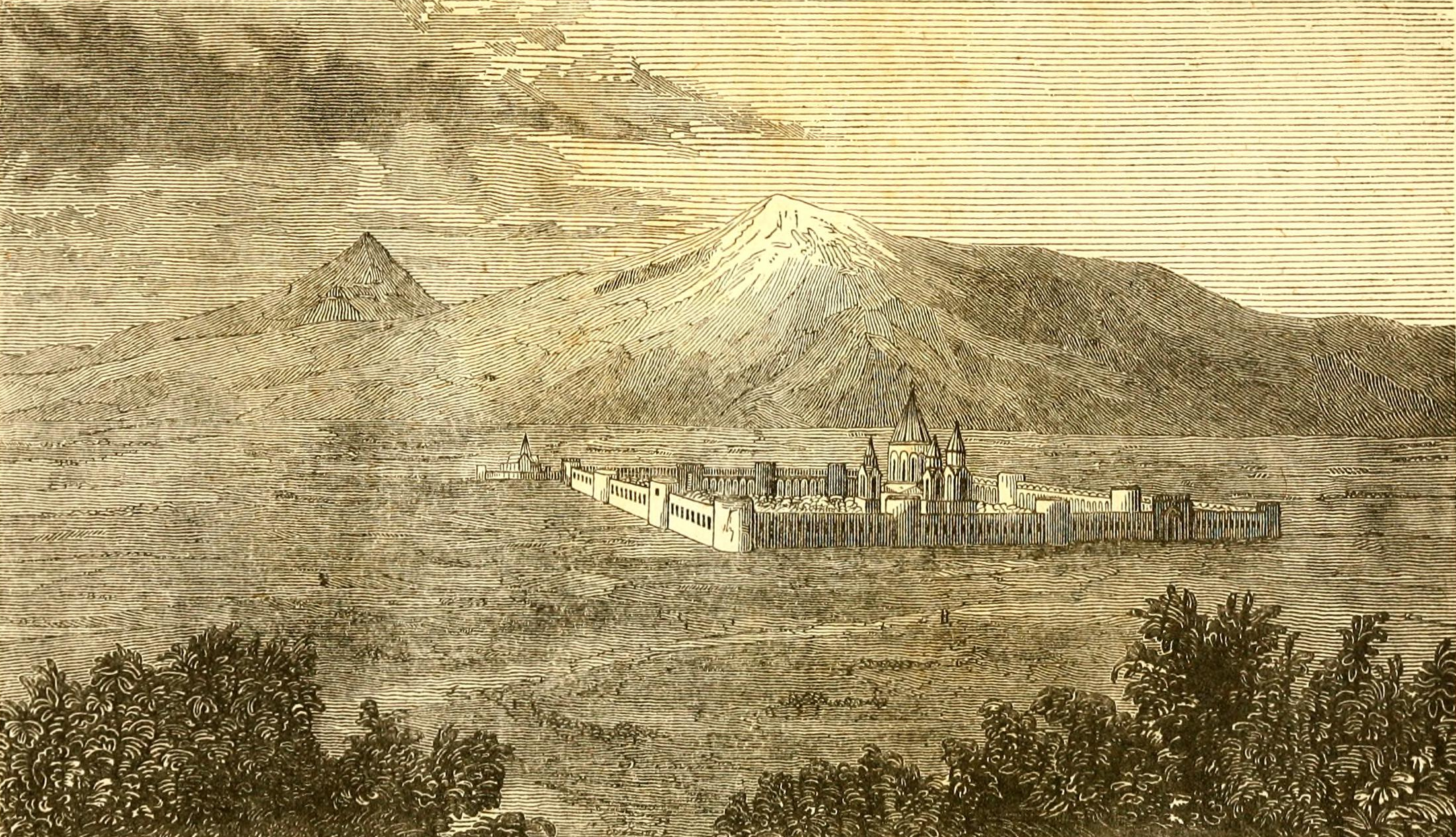
"View of Ararat and the Monastery of Echmiadzin", from the 1846 English translation of Friedrich Parrot's Journey to Ararat

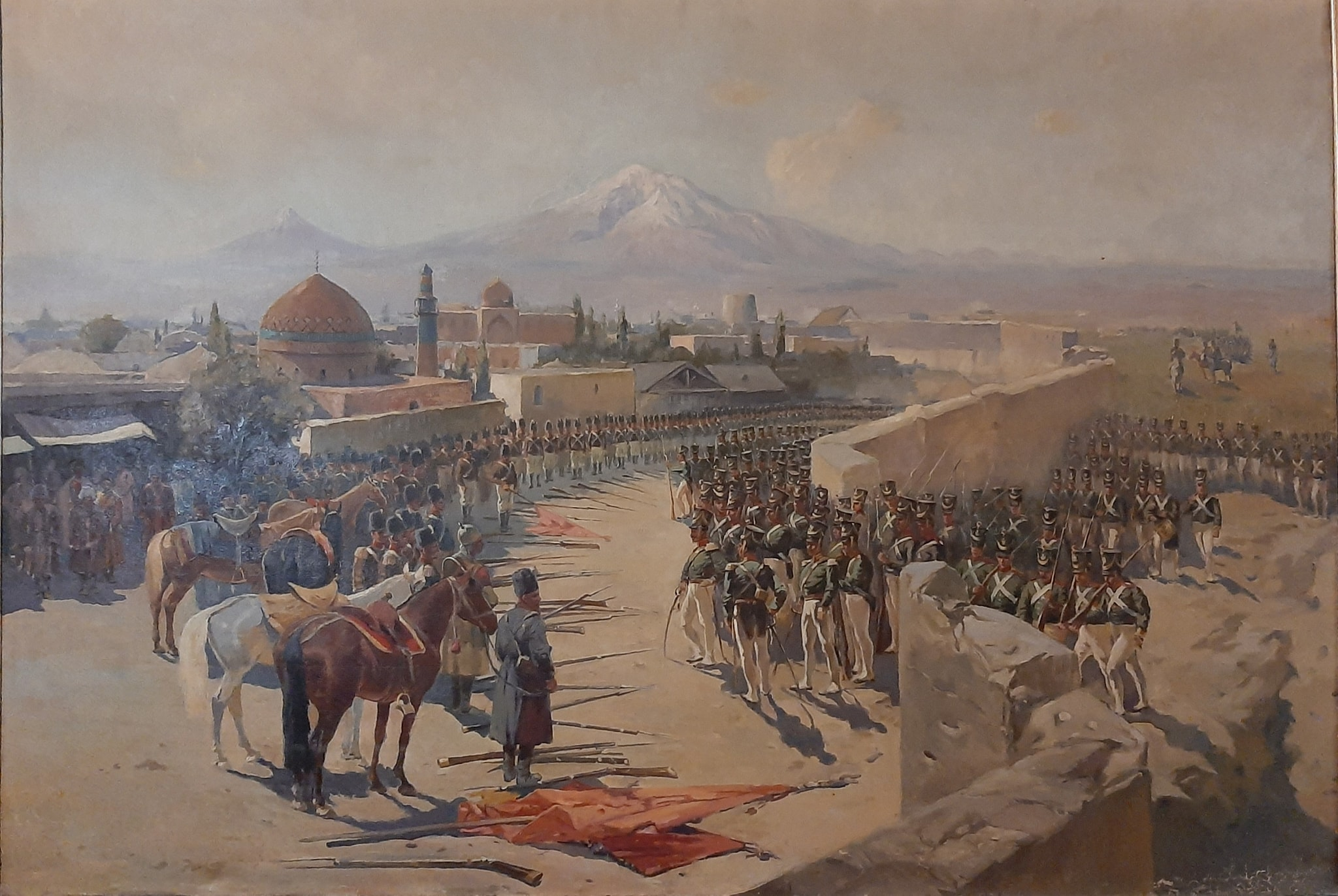
1827 Capture of Erivan by Russia, Franz Roubaud (1893)

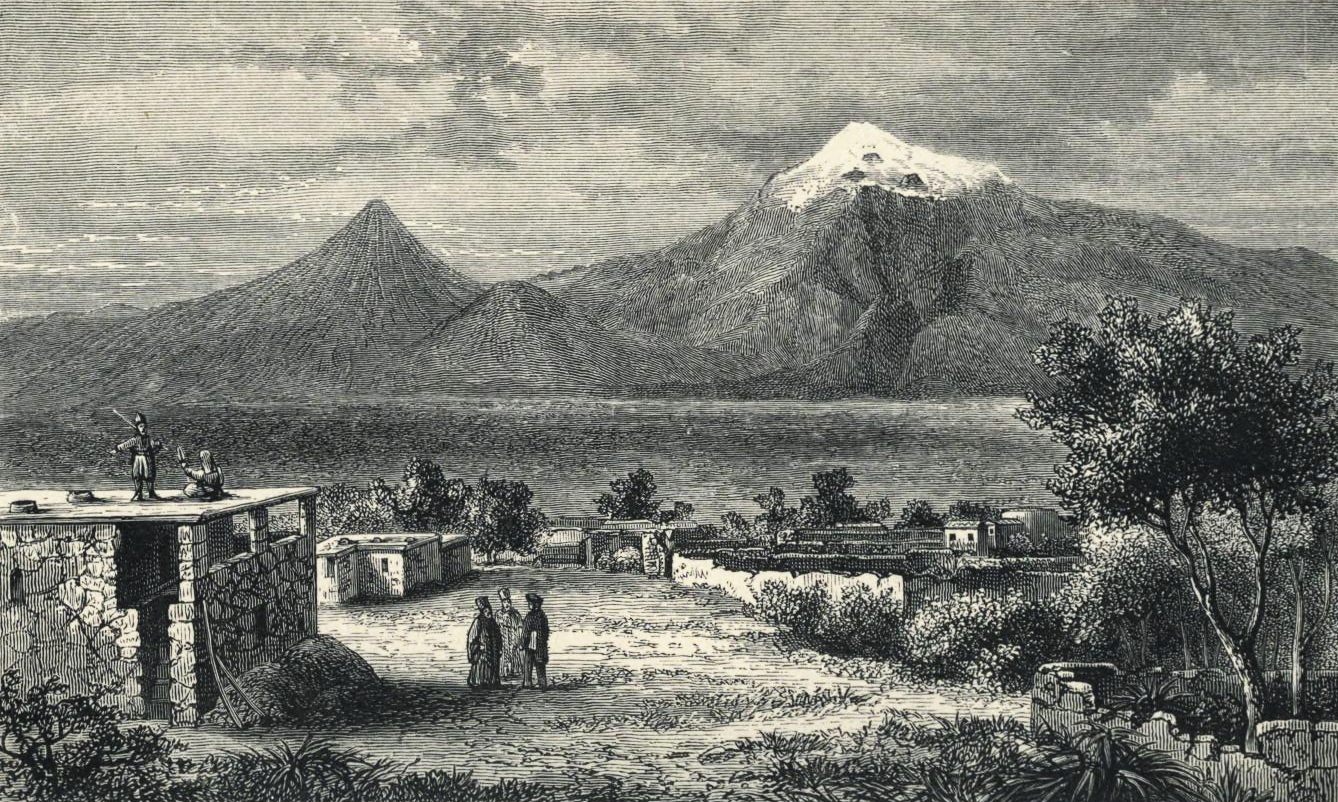
James Bryce, 1877

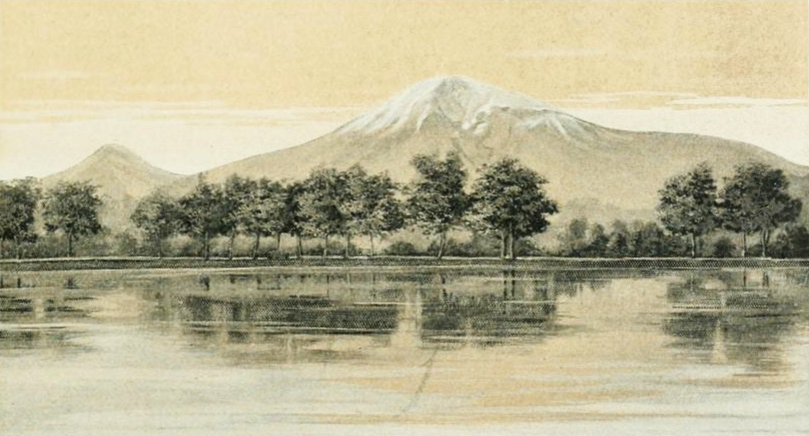
H. F. B. Lynch, 1901

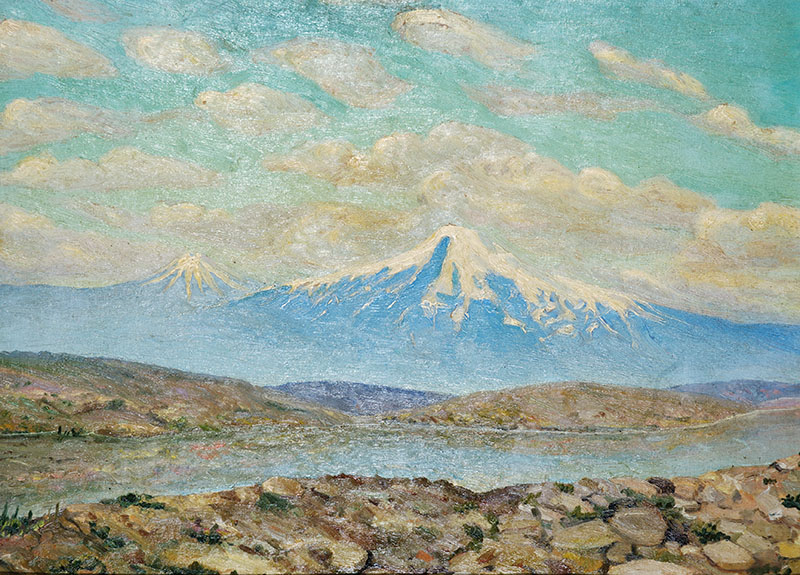
Bahruz Kangarli (1916)

=== In literature ===
Rouben Paul Adalian suggested that "there is probably more poetry written about Mount Ararat than any other mountain on earth". Travel writer Rick Antonson described Ararat as the "most fabled mountain in the world".

==== Armenian ====
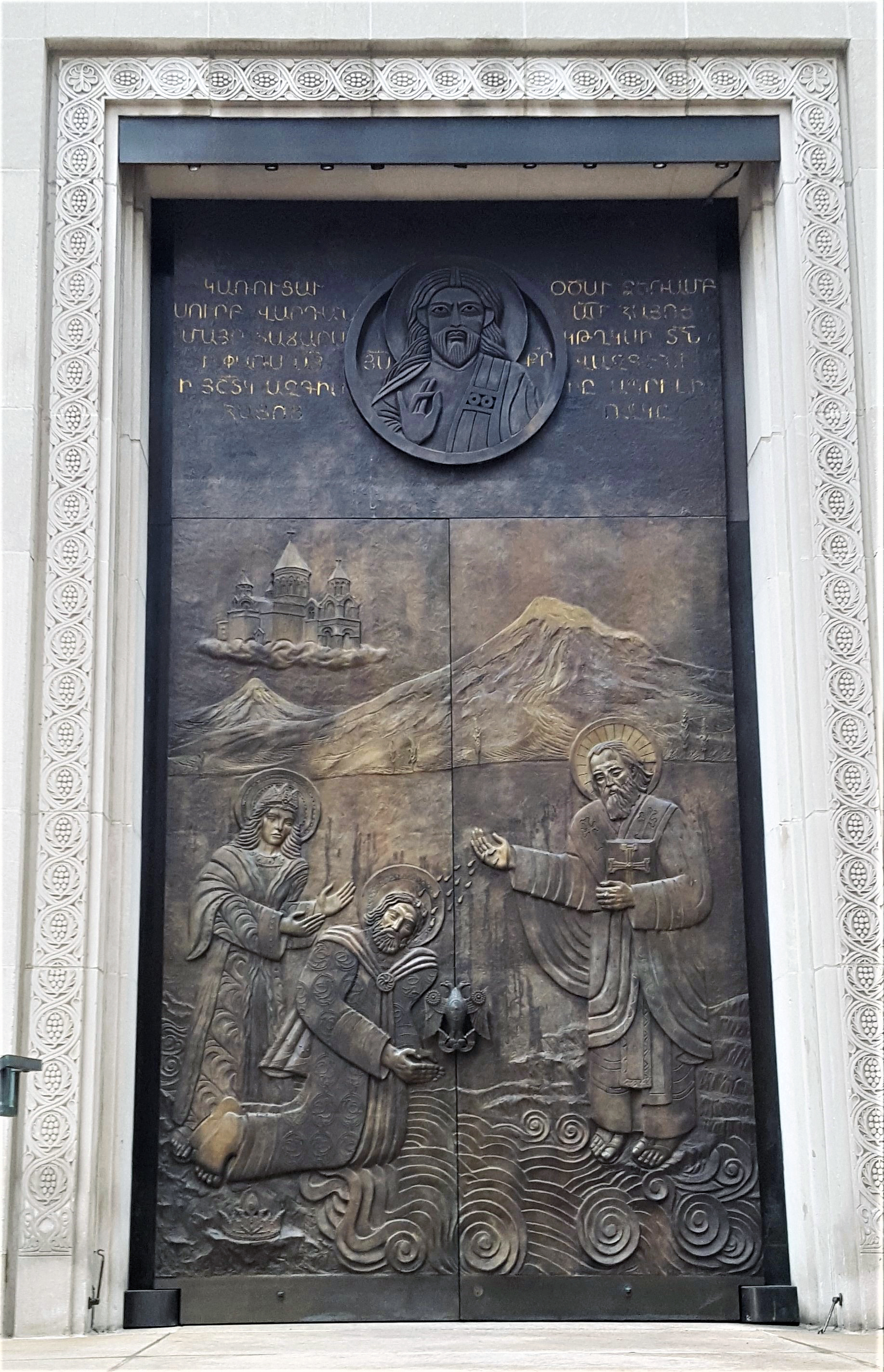
Ararat depicted on the wooden door of St. Vartan Armenian Cathedral in New York City.

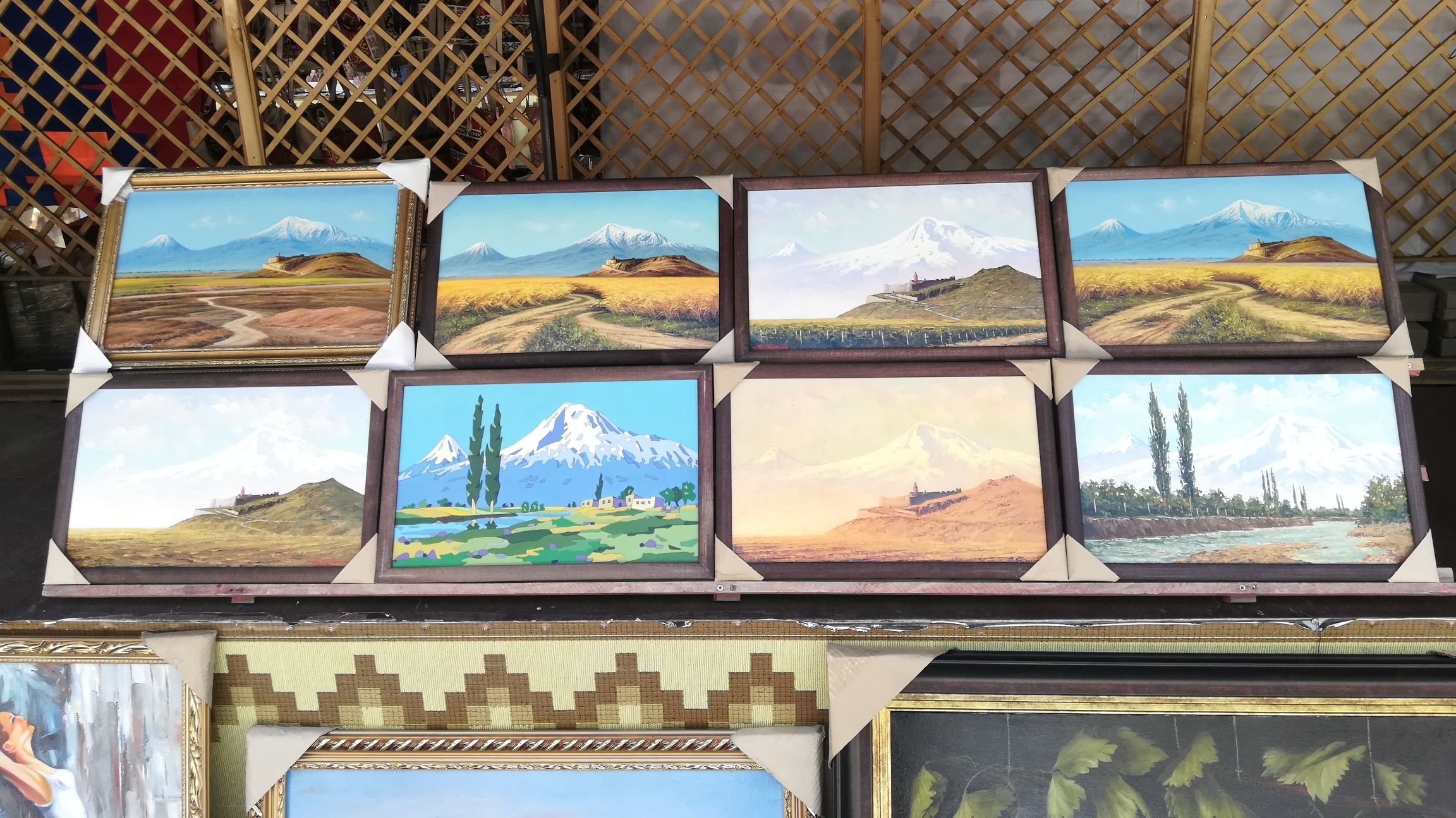
Paintings of Mount Ararat for sale at the Yerevan Vernissage.

Mount Ararat is featured prominently in Armenian literature. According to Meliné Karakashian, Armenian poets "attribute to it symbolic meanings of unity, freedom, and independence". According to Kevork Bardakjian, in Armenian literature, Ararat "epitomizes Armenia and Armenian suffering and aspirations, especially the consequences of the 1915 genocide: almost total annihilation, loss of a unique culture and land [...] and an implicit determination never to recognize the new political borders".

The last two lines of Yeghishe Charents's 1920 poem "I Love My Armenia" (Ես իմ անուշ Հայաստանի) read: "And in the entire world you will not find a mountaintop like Ararat's. / Like an unreachable peak of glory I love my Mount Masis." In a 1926 poem dedicated to the mountain Avetik Isahakyan wrote: "Ages as though in second came, / Touched the grey crest of Ararat, / And passed by...! [...] It's now your turn; you too, now, / Stare at its high and lordly brow, / And pass by...!"

Ararat is the most frequently cited symbol in the poetry of Hovhannes Shiraz. In collection of poems, Knar Hayastani (Lyre of Armenia) published in 1958, there are many poems "with very strong nationalist overtones, especially with respect to Mount Ararat (in Turkey) and the irredentism it entailed". In one such poem, "Ktak" (Bequest), Shiraz bequeaths his son Mt. Ararat to "keep it forever, / As the language of us Armenians, as the pillar of your father's home". A group of four Armenians buried Shiraz's heart at the summit of Ararat in 2006.

The first lines of Paruyr Sevak's 1961 poem "We Are Few..." (Քիչ ենք, բայց հայ ենք) read: "We are few, but they say of us we are Armenians. / We do not think ourselves superior to anyone. / Clearly we shall have to accept / That we, and only we, have an Ararat".

==== Non-Armenian ====
English Romantic poet William Wordsworth imagines seeing the ark in the poem "Sky-prospect — From the Plain of France".

In his Journey to Arzrum (Путешествие в Арзрум; 1835–36), the celebrated Russian poet Aleksandr Pushkin recounted his travels to the Caucasus and Armenia at the time of the Russo-Turkish War of 1828–29. He wrote the following about his observations of Ararat:

I went out of the tent into the fresh morning air. The sun was rising. Against the clear sky one could see a white-snowcapped, twin-peaked mountain. 'What mountain is that?' I asked, stretching myself, and heard the answer: 'That's Ararat.' What a powerful effect a few syllables can have! Avidly I looked at the Biblical mountain, saw the ark moored to its peak with the hope of regeneration and life, saw both the raven and dove, flying forth, the symbols of punishment and reconciliation...

Russian Symbolist poet Valery Bryusov often referred to Ararat in his poetry and dedicated two poems to the mountain, (Note: "К Арарату" ("To Ararat") and "Арарат из Эривани" ("Ararat from Erivan")) which were published in 1917. Bryusov saw Ararat as the embodiment of antiquity of the Armenian people and their culture.

Russian poet Osip Mandelstam wrote fondly of Ararat during his 1933 travels in Armenia. "I have cultivated in myself a sixth sense, an 'Ararat' sense", the poet wrote, "the sense of an attraction to a mountain."

During his travels to Armenia, Soviet Russian writer Vasily Grossman observed Mount Ararat from Yerevan standing "high in the blue sky". He wrote that "with its gentle, tender contours, it seems to grow not out of the earth but out of the sky, as if it has condensed from its white clouds and its deep blue. It is this snowy mountain, this bluish-white sunlit mountain that shone in the eyes of those who wrote the Bible."

In The Maximus Poems (1953) American poet Charles Olson, who grew up near the Armenian neighborhood in Worcester, Massachusetts, compares the Ararat Hill near his childhood home to the mountain and "imagines he can capture an Armenian's immigrant perspective: the view of Ararat Hill as Mount Ararat".

The world renowned Turkish-Kurdish writer Yaşar Kemal's 1970 book entitled Ağrı Dağı Efsanesi (The Legend of Mount Ararat) is about a local myth about a poor boy and the governor's daughter. There is also an opera (1971) and a film (1975) based on that novel.

In the 1984 science fiction novel Orion by Ben Bova, part three entitled "Flood" is set at an unspecified valley at the foot of Mount Ararat. The antagonist, Ahriman, floods the valley by melting the snow caps of the mountain in a bid to stop the invention of agriculture by a band of Epipalaeolithic hunter-gatherers.

Several major episodes in the supernatural spy novel Declare (2001) by Tim Powers take place on Mount Ararat, which is the focal point of supernatural happenings.

=== In popular culture ===
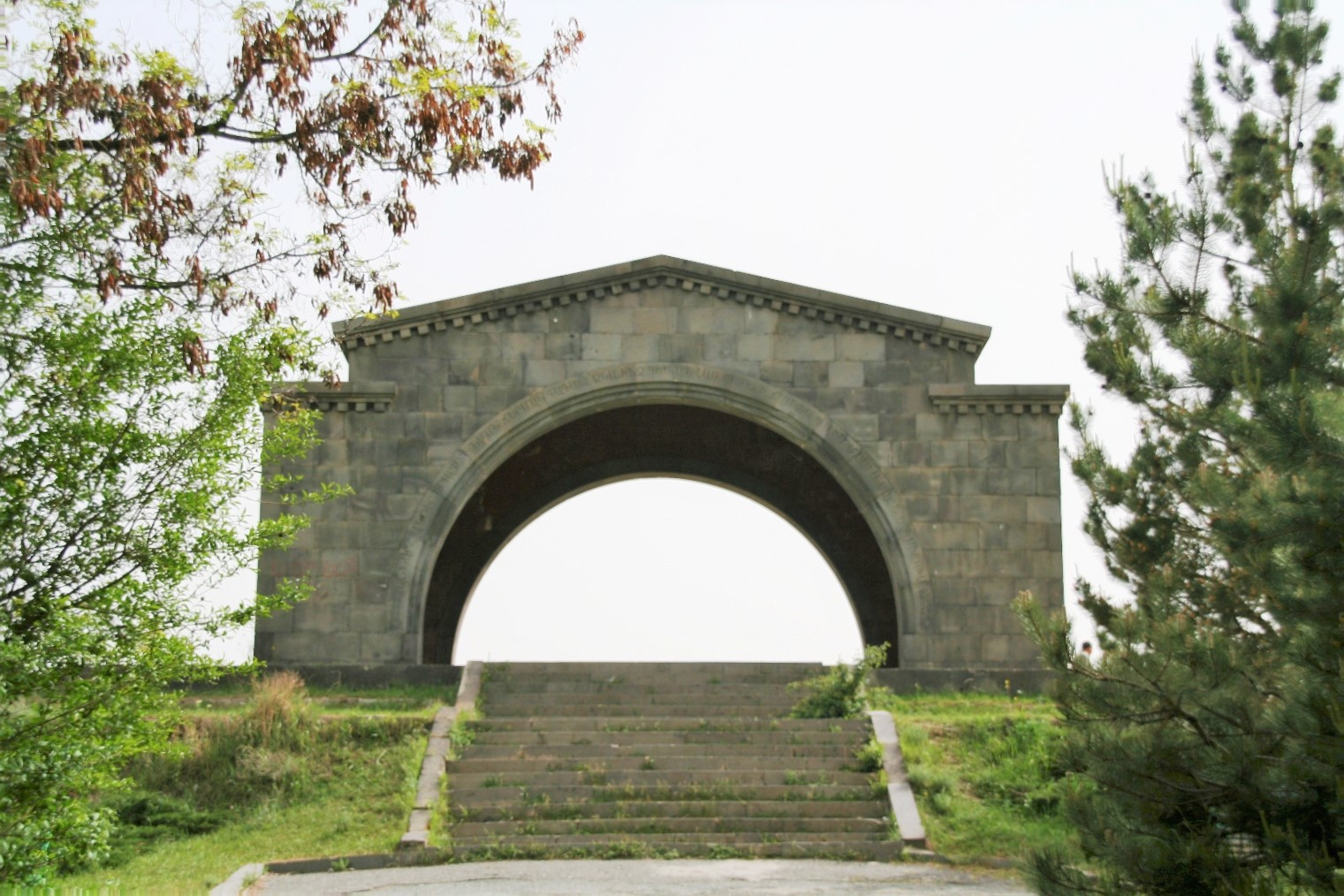

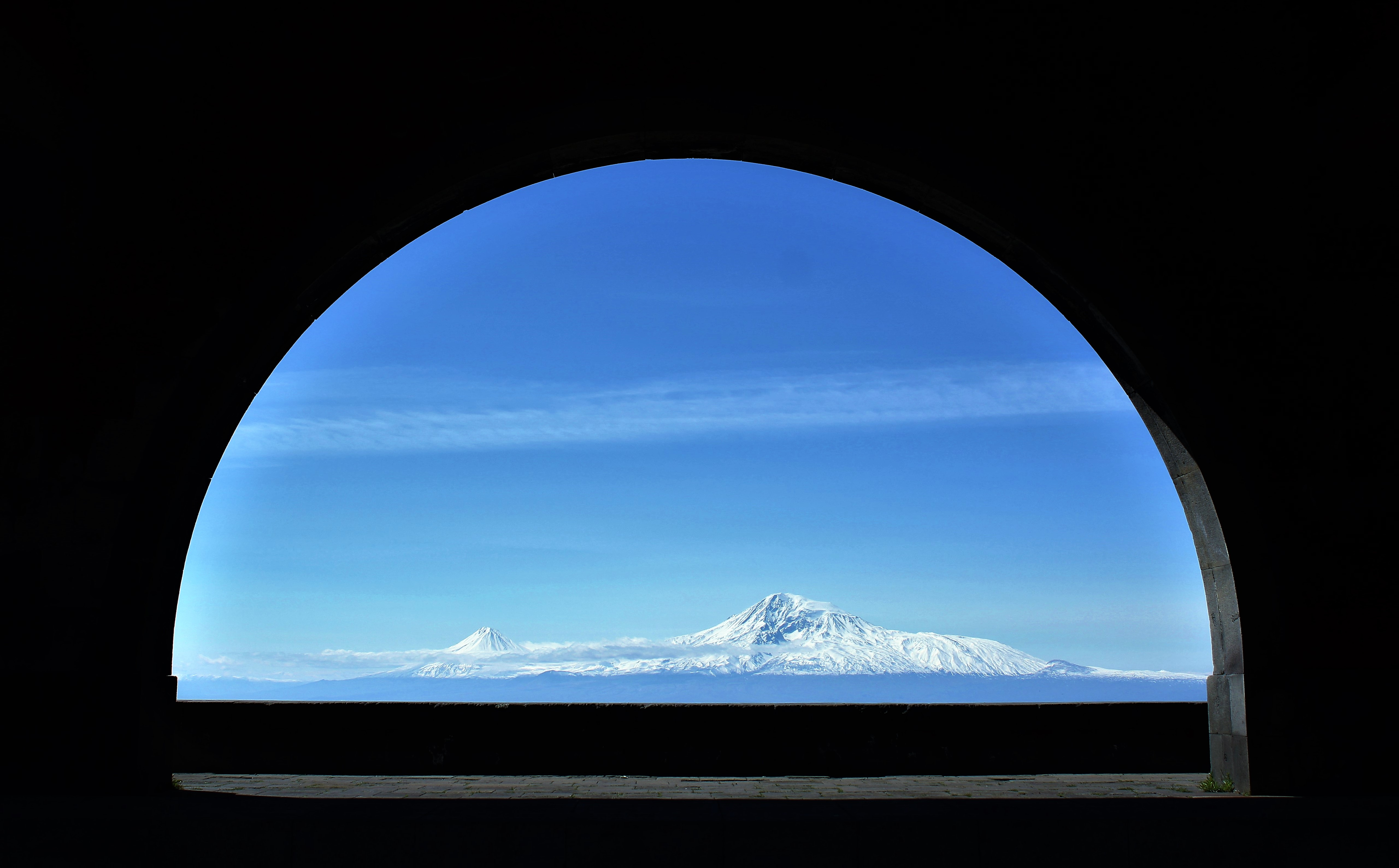
The Arch of Charents, in Voghjaberd, is an iconic site offering a panoramic view of the mountain. It was designed by Rafayel Israyelian and built in 1957.

In music

- "Holy Mountains", the 8th track of the album Hypnotize (2005) by System of a Down, an American rock band composed of four Armenian Americans, "references Mount Ararat [...] and details that the souls lost to the Armenian Genocide have returned to rest here".
- "Here's to You Ararat" is a song from the 2006 album How Much is Yours of Arto Tunçboyacıyan's Armenian Navy Band.

In film

- The 2002 film Ararat by Armenian-Canadian filmmaker Atom Egoyan features Mount Ararat prominently in its symbolism.
- The 2011 documentary film Journey to Ararat on Parrot and Abovian's expedition to Ararat was produced in Estonia by filmmaker Riho Västrik. It was screened at the Golden Apricot International Film Festival in Yerevan in 2013.

== Eponymous places ==
In Armenia

- In Armenia, four settlements are named after the mountain's two names: Ararat and Masis. All are located in the Ararat Plain. First, the village of Davalu was renamed Ararat in 1935, followed by Tokhanshalu being renamed Masis in 1945, and the workers town of Davalu's nearby cement factory also being renamed Ararat in 1947 (granted a city status in 1962). The railway town of Ulukhanlu was renamed Masis in 1950, while the former village/town of Ulukhanlu, renamed Hrazdan and then Masis in 1969. The two merged to form the urban-type settlement of Masis, the current town, in 1971.
- In the Soviet and early post-Soviet period there were administrative divisions (shrjan or raion) called Ararat (Vedi until 1968) and Masis, formed in 1930 and 1968, respectively. They became a part of the province (marz) of Ararat in the 1995.
- The name is also used in two dioceses of the Armenian Apostolic Church: the Araratian Pontifical Diocese and the Diocese of Masyatsotn, encompassing capital Yerevan and the Ararat province, respectively.

Elsewhere

- The Turkish province of Ağrı was named after the Turkish name of the mountain in 1927, while the provincial capital city of Karaköse was renamed to Ağrı in 1946.
- In the United States, a river in Virginia and North Carolina was named Ararat after the mountain no later than 1770. An unincorporated community in North Carolina was later named after the river. A township (formed in 1852) and a mountain in Pennsylvania are called Ararat.
- In the Australian state of Victoria, a city was named Ararat in 1840. Its local government area is also called Ararat.
- 96205 Ararat is an asteroid named in the mountain's honor. It was discovered in 1992 by Freimut Börngen and Lutz D. Schmadel at Tautenburg Observatory in Germany. The name was proposed by Börngen.

=== States ===
- Besides Ararat being the Hebrew version of Urartu, this Iron Age state is often referred to as the "Araratian Kingdom" or the "Kingdom of Ararat" (Armenian: Արարատյան թագավորություն, Arartyan t'agavorut'yun) in Armenian historiography. Levon Abrahamian argues that this name gives it a "biblical and an Armenian touch."
- The First Republic of Armenia, the first modern Armenian state that existed between 1918 and 1920, was sometimes called the Araratian Republic or the Republic of Ararat (Armenian: Արարատյան Հանրապետություն, Araratyan hanrapetut'yun) as it was centered in the Ararat plain.
- In 1927 the Kurdish nationalist party Xoybûn led by Ihsan Nuri, fighting an uprising against the Turkish government, declared the independence of the Republic of Ararat (Kurdish: Komara Agiriyê), centered around Mount Ararat.

== Gallery ==
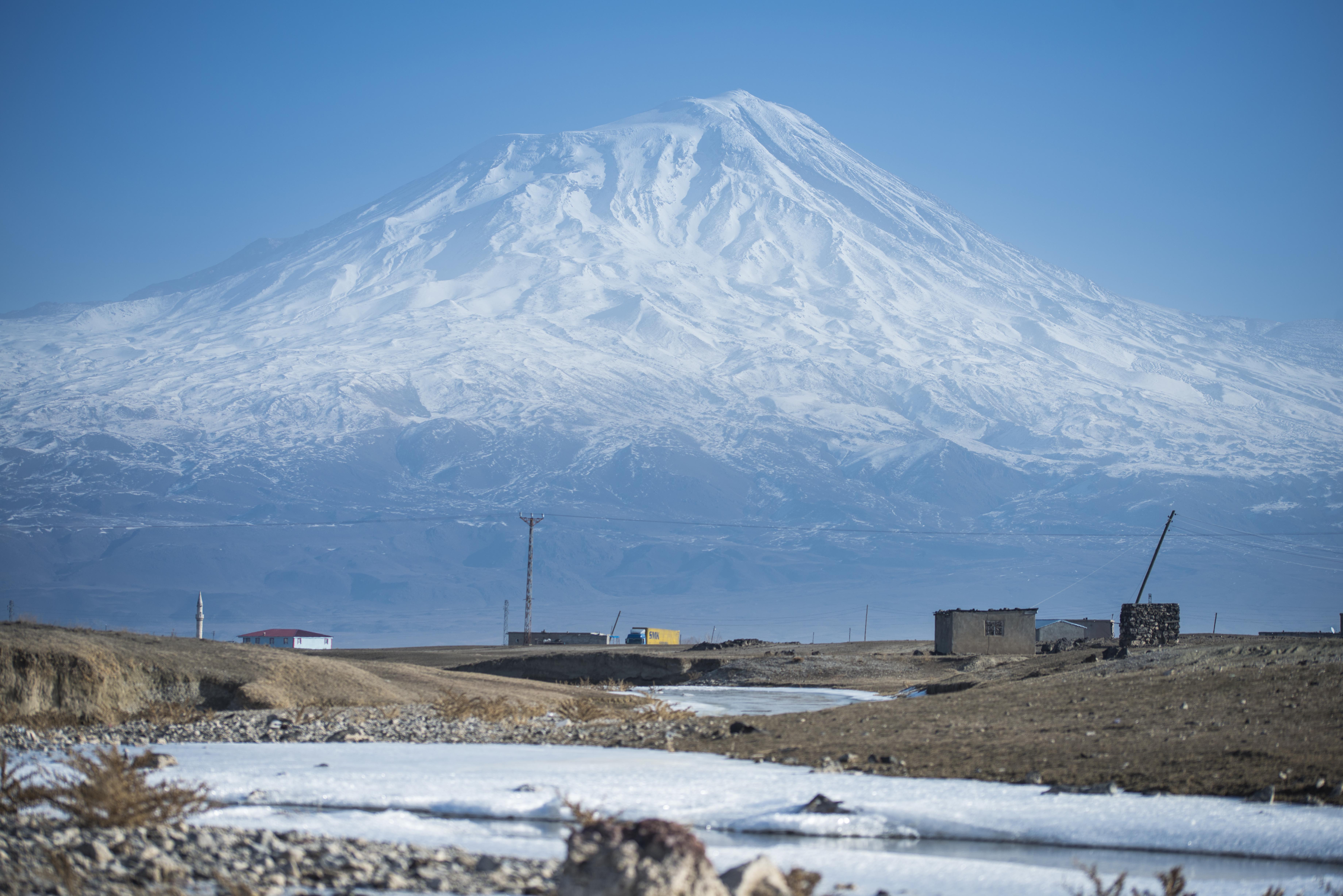

Mount Ararat view from the plane

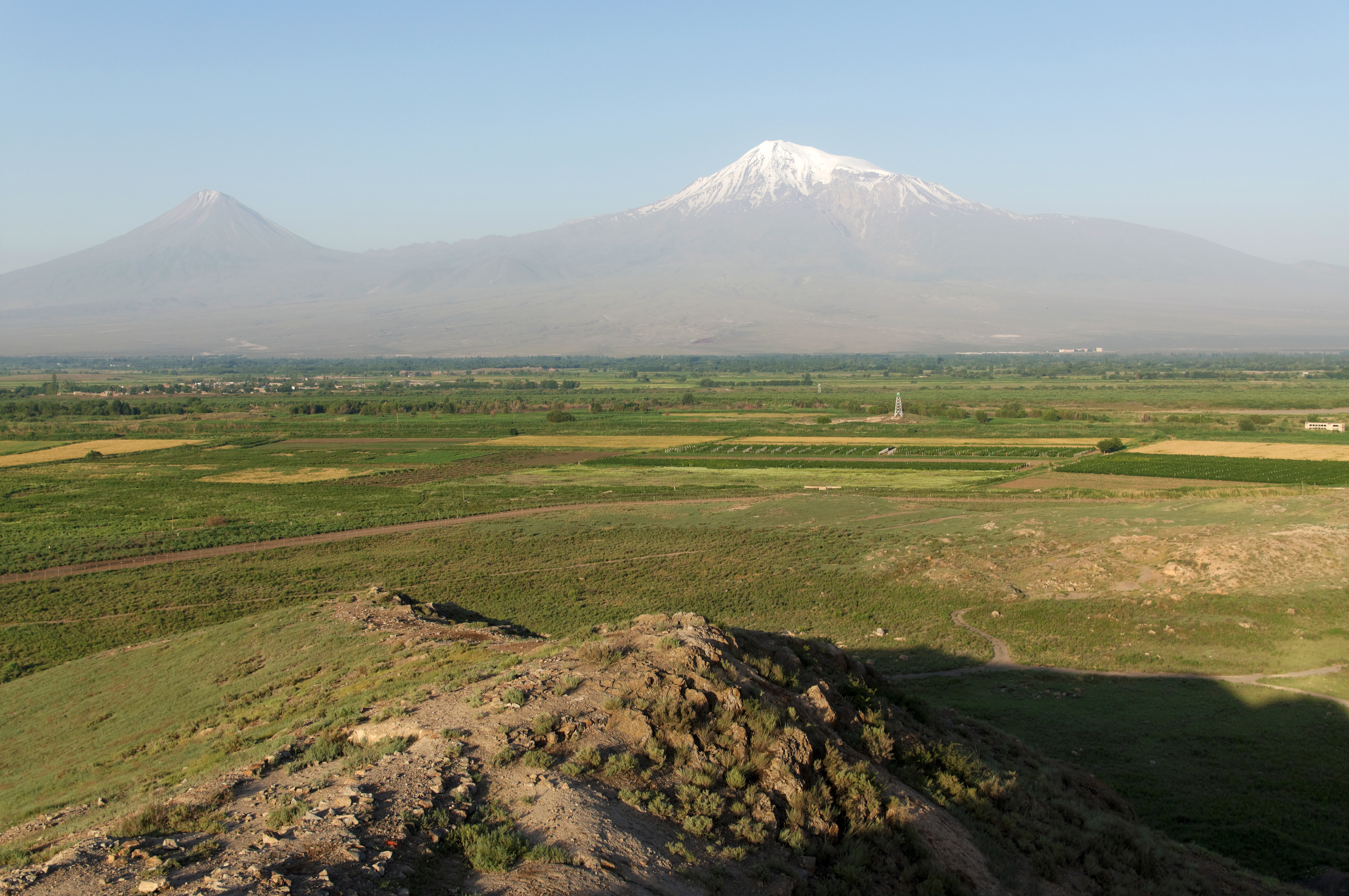
Mount Ararat and Armenia-Turkey border early in the morning

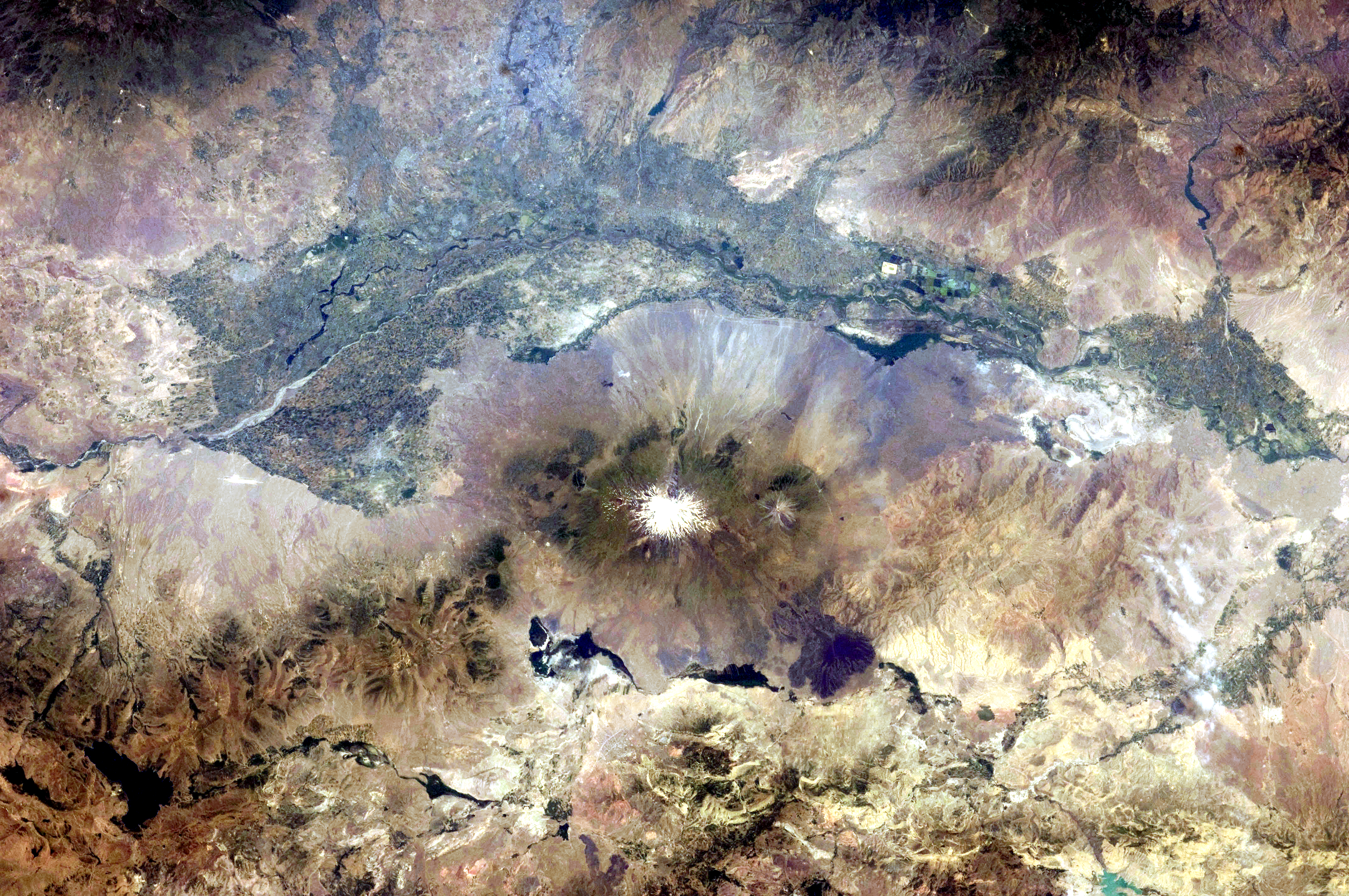
Seen from the International Space Station, 8 July 2011

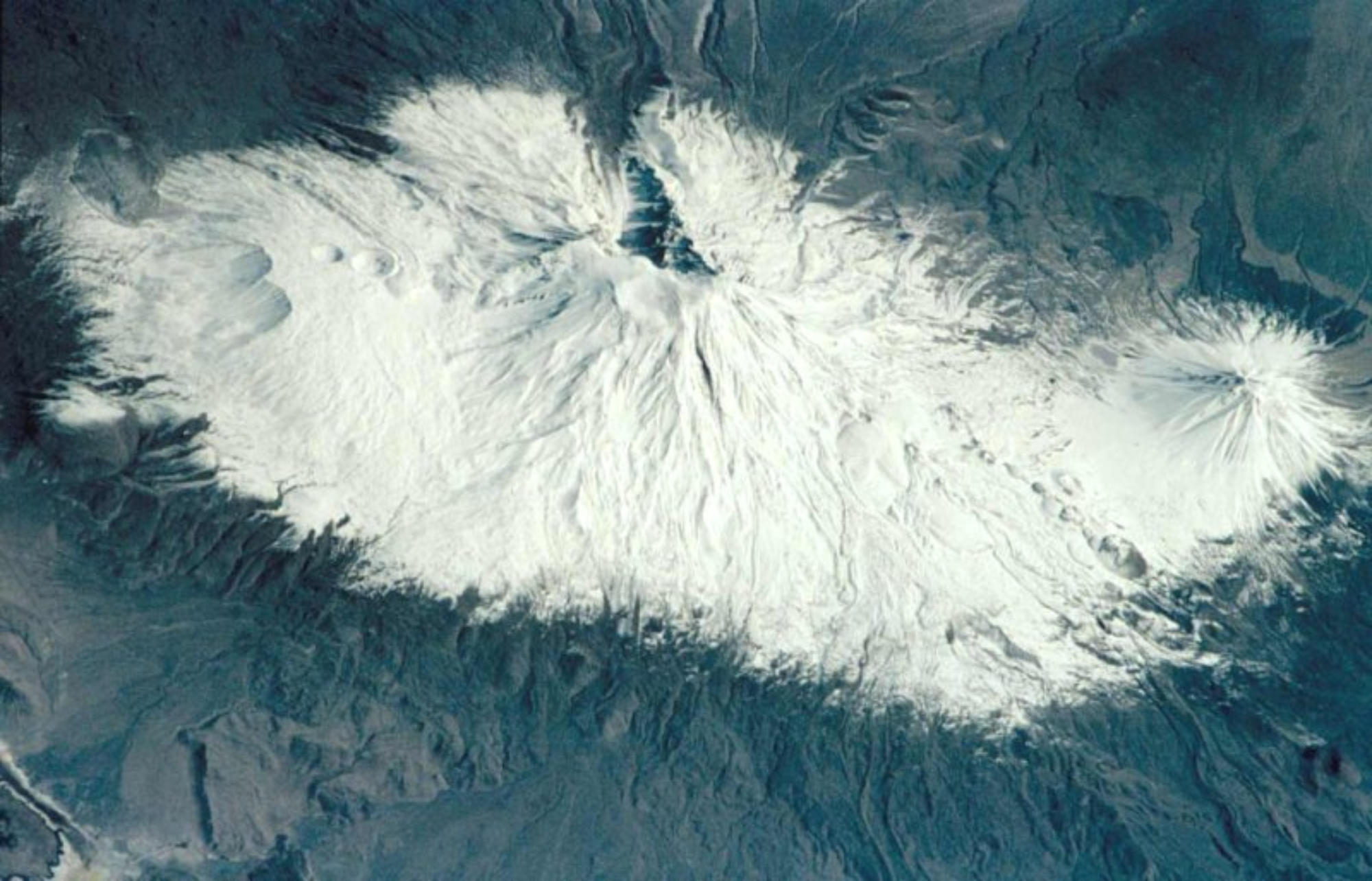
From the Space Shuttle, 18 March 2001

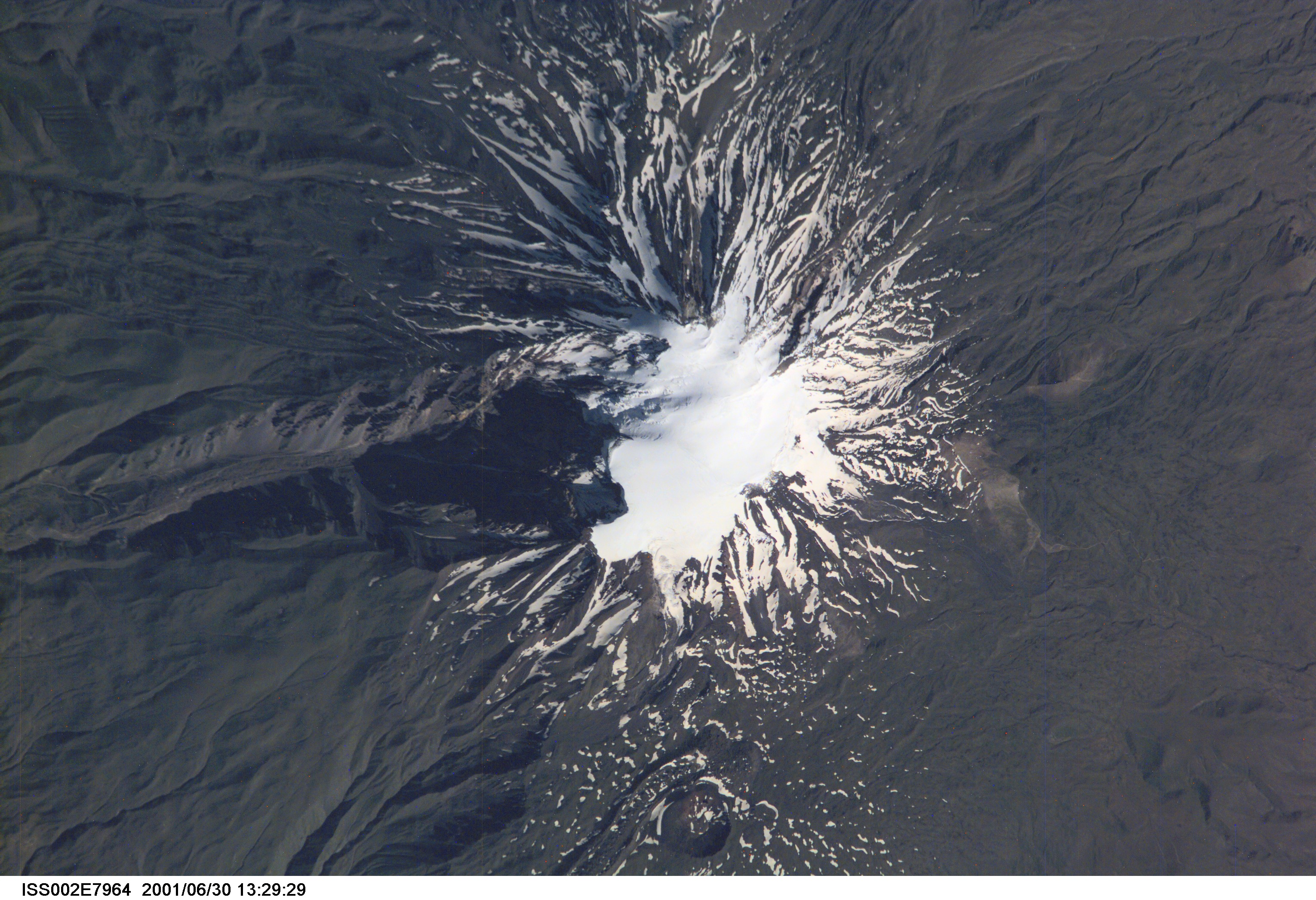
View of Mount Ararat taken during ISS Expedition 2, June 30 2001

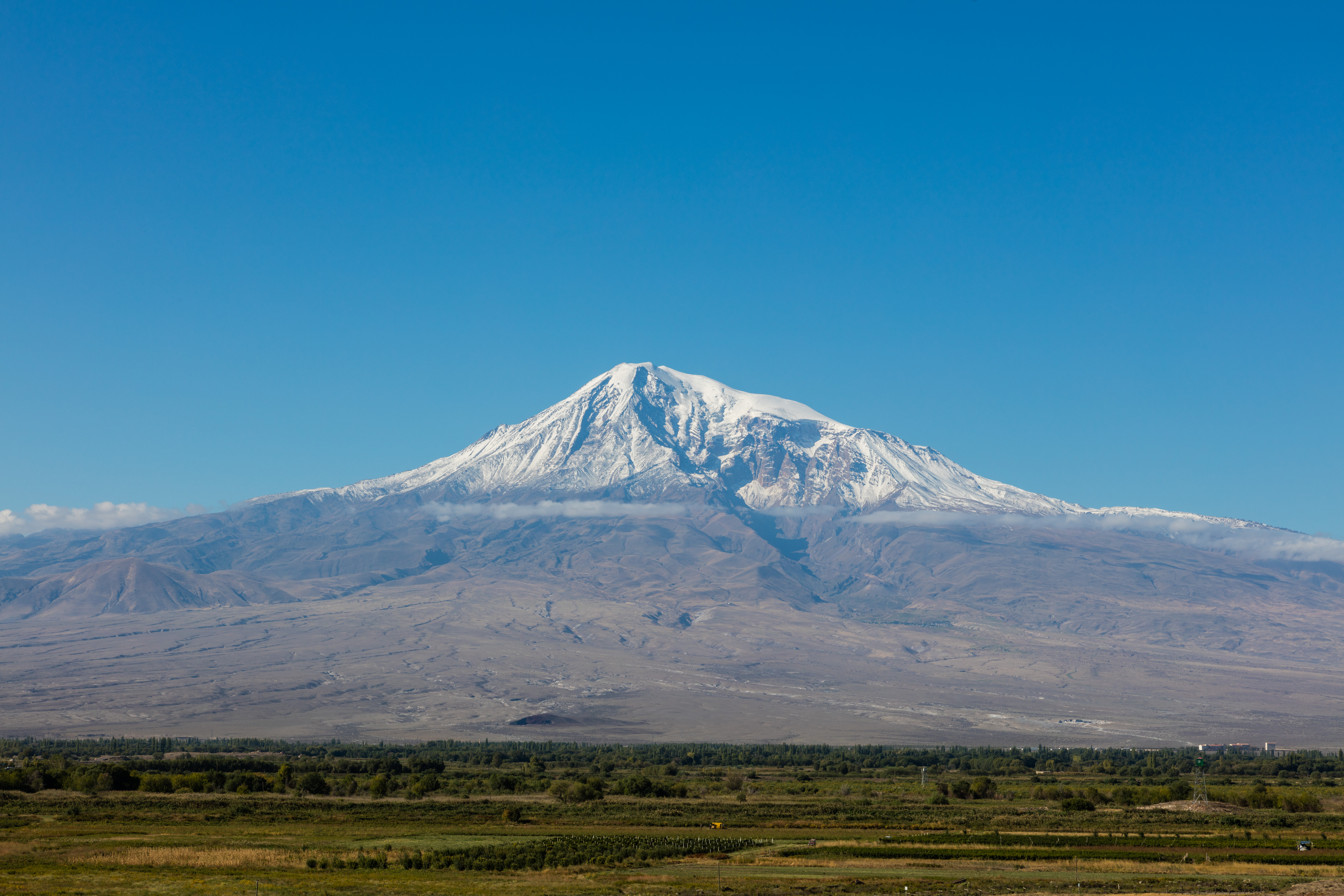
View of Ararat from Khor Virap, Armenia

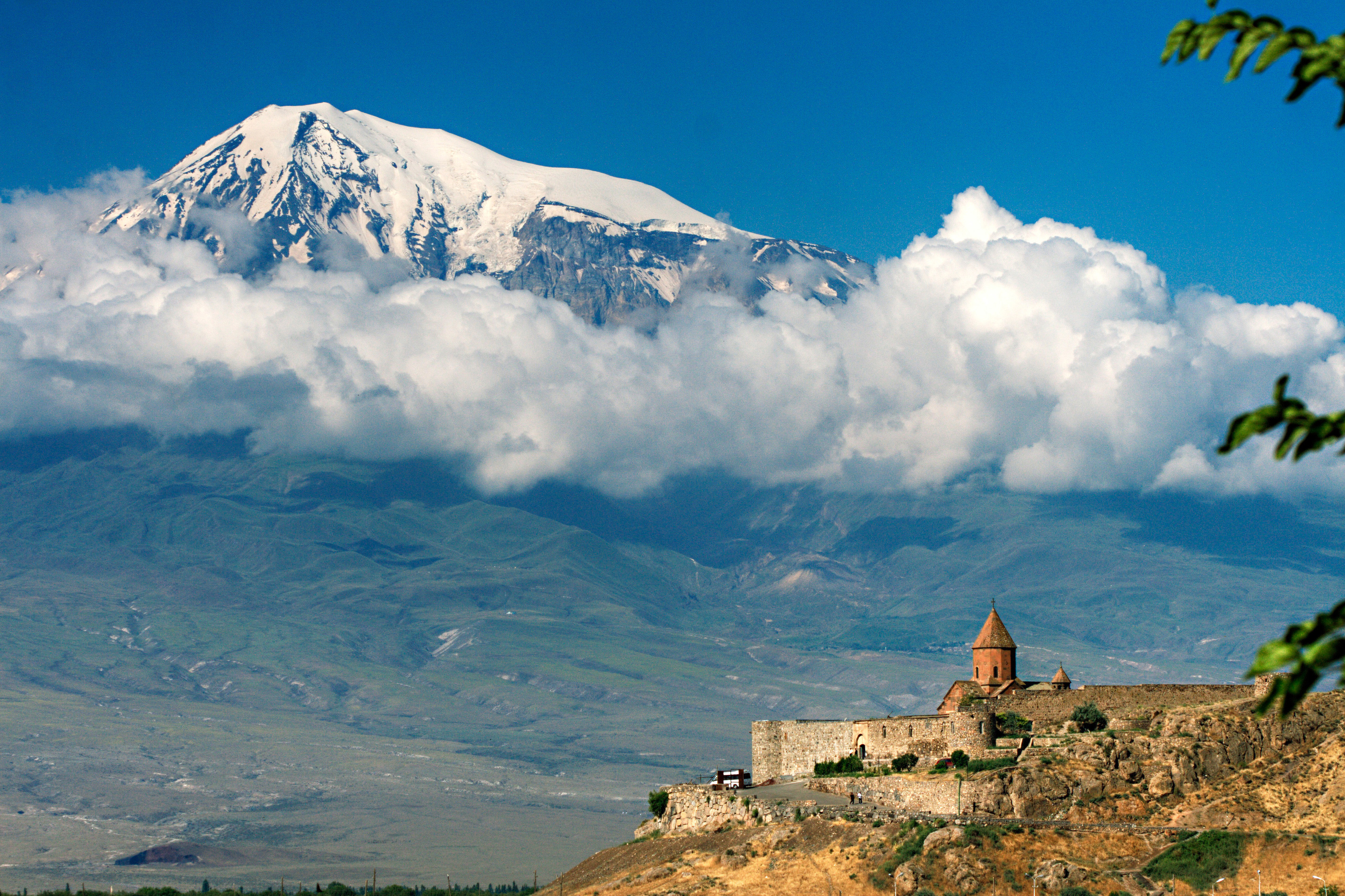
View of Ararat with the Khor Virap in the front, Armenia

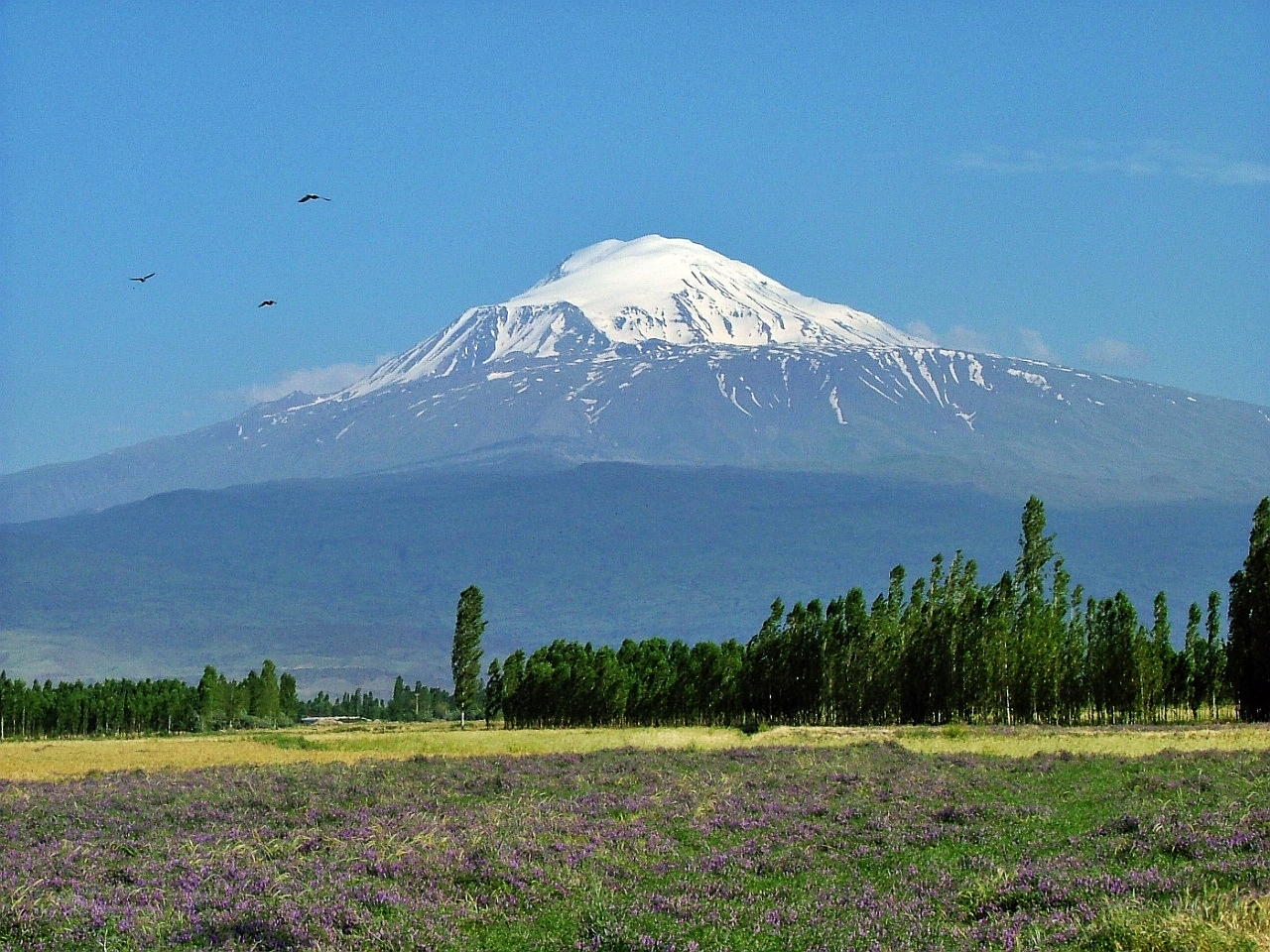
View of Ararat from Iğdır, Turkey

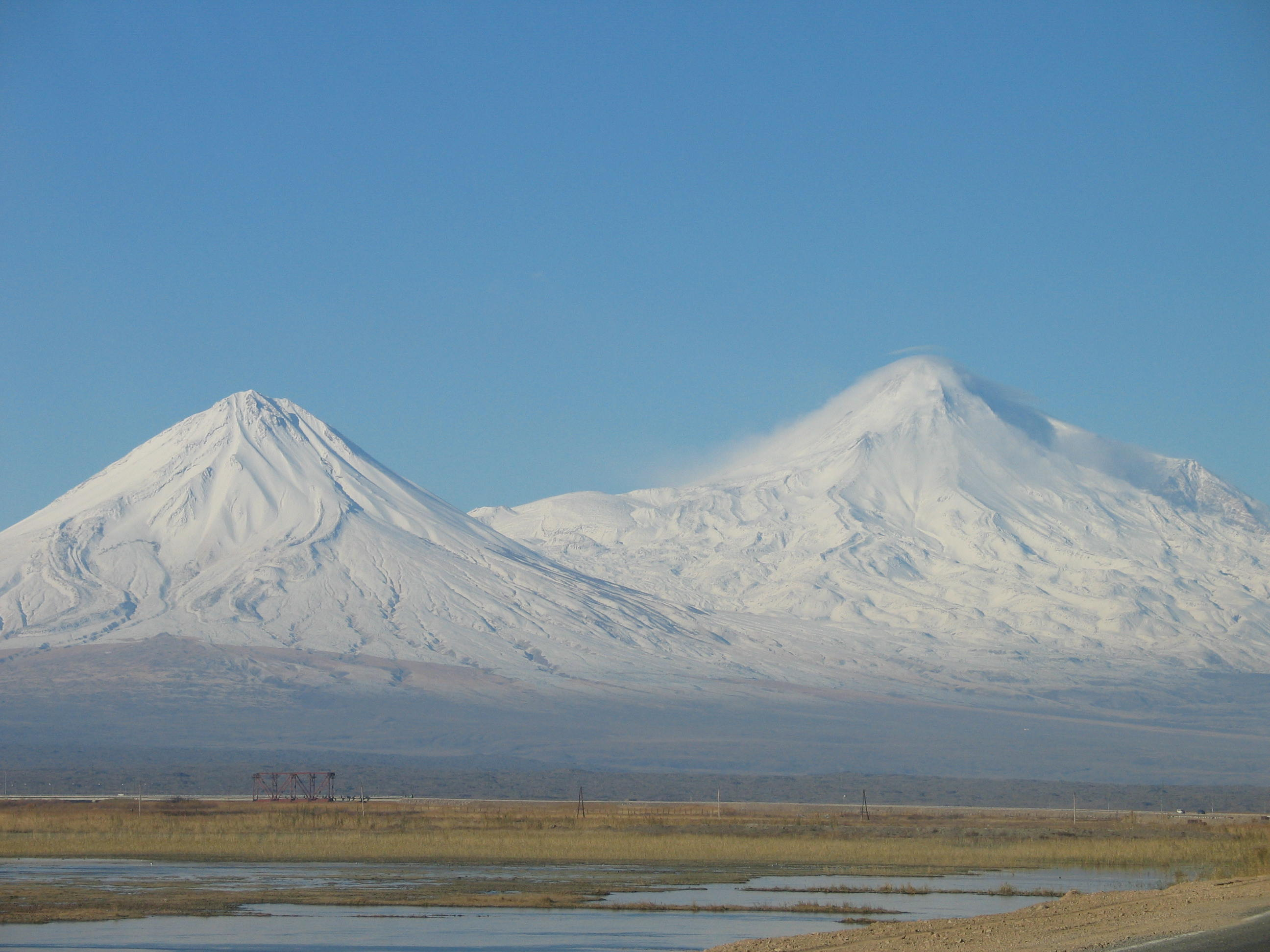
From Nakhchivan

== See also ==
- Mount Elbrus
- Mount Judi
