= National symbols of Armenia =

The national symbols of Armenia have a long history and encompass thousand-year-old traditions of the Armenian people, as well as Armenian heraldic, musical and artistic traditions. This page provides an incomplete list of those symbols.

== Official symbols ==
Image	Name	Description	Date
The flag of Armenia	Flag of Armenia	The flag of Armenia is consisted out of three colour stripes of the same width: red, blue, orange, from top to bottom, the width-length ratio of the flag is 1:2. Red symbolises the Armenian highlands, the Armenian people continuous struggle for survival, maintenance of the Christian faith, Armenian freedom and independence. Blue symbolises the will of Armenian people to live under the peaceful skies, and the orange symbolises the hard-working nature and the creative talent of the people of Armenia.	adopted in 1918 and 1990
Coat of arms of Armenia	Coat of arms of Armenia	The coat of arms of Armenia is a rendition of the coat of arms of the First Republic of Armenia, which existed between 1918 and 1920. On the shield in the center, the mount Ararat is depicted with the Noah's Ark on top, which is one of the symbols of modern Armenia. The four Armenian royal dynasties are depicted in clockwise direction from top-left: Bagratids, Arsacids, Rubenids and Artaxiads. There is a lion to the right of the shield and an eagle to the left. In the bottom there is a sword, a branch of a tree, a bundle of spikes, a chain and a ribbon. Armenian coat of arms has the colors of Armenian flags.	Adopted on 19 April 1992
National anthem of Armenia	National Anthem of Armenia	The anthem of the Republic of Armenia is called "Mer Hayrenik"/"Our Fatherland". It is the slightly modified version of the Anthem of the First Republic of Armenia, and based on the poem by Michael Nalbandian with the music composed by Barsegh Kanachian.	Adopted on 1 July 1991

== Artsakhi symbols ==
Image	Name	Description	Date
The flag of Artsakh	National Flag of Artsakh	The flag of Artsakh is derived from the flag of Armenia, with only a white pattern added. A white, five-toothed, stepped carpet pattern was added to the flag, beginning at the two verges of the cloth's right side and connecting at a point equal to one-third of the distance from that side. The white pattern symbolized the separation of Artsakh from Armenia proper and its aspiration for eventual union with the Republic's claimed Fatherland. This symbolized the Armenian heritage, culture and population of the area and represents Artsakh as being a separated region of Armenia by the triangular shape and the zigzag cutting through the flag. The pattern was also similar to the designs used on rugs. The ratio of the flag's breadth to its length is 1:2, same as the Armenian tricolour.	Adopted on 2 June 1992
Emblem of Artsakh	Emblem of Artsakh	The Emblem of Artsakh consists of an eagle above which is an ornamented crown. On the chest of the eagle is a shield with a panorama of a mountain range and under it a vertically set Flag of the Republic of Artsakh. Over this are the two stone heads of "Grandmother and Grandfather" (Tatik-Papik) from the We Are Our Mountains monument in Stepanakert. The eagle's feet clutch various agricultural products including wheat and grapes. The outer rim is made up of a golden circular ribbon bearing inscription "Artsakh Republic of Mountainous Karabakh" in Armenian.	Adopted on 17 November 1992
National anthem of Artsakh	National Anthem of Artsakh	The anthem of the Republic of Artsakh is called "Azat u ankakh Artsakh" (English: Free and Independent Artsakh). It was written by Vardan Hakobyan, and composed by Armen Nasibyan.	Adopted on 17 November 1992
Tatik-Papik	We Are Our Mountains	National monument	A monument north of Stepanakert in the region of Nagorno-Karabakh. The sculpture, completed in 1967 by Sargis Baghdasaryan, is widely regarded as a symbol of the Armenian heritage of Nagorno-Karabakh, with some considering it to be a symbol of Armenian identity as a whole. The sculpture is prominent in Artsakh's coat of arms.

== Unofficial symbols ==
Image	Name	Category	Description
Hayk	Hayk Nahapet	National founder	Considered the traditional founder of Armenia, to which he gave his namesake (Hayk/Hayastan) and occasionally considered as the ancestor to all Armenians.
Saint Gregory	Gregory the Illuminator	Patron saint	Founder and first official head of the Armenian Apostolic Church.
Ararat	Mount Ararat	National mountain	Ararat is a sacred mountain for Armenians. Armenians believe that Noah's Ark landed on it and became the foundation of the Armenian nation. It is one of the most recognizable and iconic national symbols of Armenia.
Duduk	Duduk	National musical instrument	The duduk is an Armenian national instrument hailing out of the Kingdom of Urartu. The original name for this instrument is tsiranapokh, which roughly translates as an "apricot tube". Duduk's are made solely out of apricot wood, since it gives it a distinct sound.
Apricots	Apricot	National fruit	The academic name for apricot is "Prunus Armeniaca" due to the suspected Armenian origin, as Alexander the Great originally brought the fruit from Rome. The fruit plays an enormous role in Armenian culture and folklore. The Armenian national musical instrument, duduk, is made from apricot tree wood.
Khachkars	Khachkars	Armenian cross stone	Cross-stones or khachkars is an ancient Armenian symbol unique to Armenian culture of the great architectural value. Khachkars are made on variety of occasions: victory in a war, death of a person, completion of construction of a temple or a bridge and et. cetera. Every khachkar differs from one another, so it is almost impossible to find an identical one.
Forget-me-not	Forget-me-not	National flower	Forget-me-not is a symbol of the commemoration of the Armenian genocide and appeared following its Centennial. The yellow part symbolizes the memorial of Tsitsernakaberd, and the purple colour denotes the recognition and the condemnation of the genocide.
Arevakhach	Arevakhach	Armenian cross	Roughly translating as "sun-cross", Arevakhach is an ancient Armenian symbol with its origins hailing from the Kura–Araxes culture.
Dram	Armenian dram	National currency	The historical currency of Armenia.
Taraz	Armenian Taraz	National dress	Traditional dress of Armenia

== See also ==
- Armorial of Armenia
- Art of Armenia
- Culture of Armenia
- Flags of Armenia
- History of Armenia
- Music of Armenia
- Symbols of Europe
