= Armorial of Armenia =

This is a list of coat of arms of Armenia. It includes historical coat of arms as well as the ones of Armenian dynasties and attributed to Armenia by various scrolls at some point in time. It can also include emblems of Armenia if used for similar purpose.

== Current ==
=== Coat of arms of Armenia ===
National coat of arms of Armenia

National coat of arms of Armenia (the escutcheon only).

Seal of the president of Armenia

=== Provincial emblems and coat of arms ===
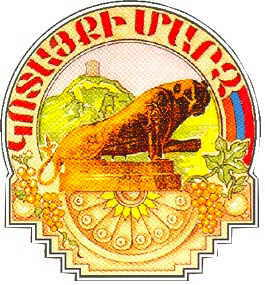
Coat of arms of Kotayk Province

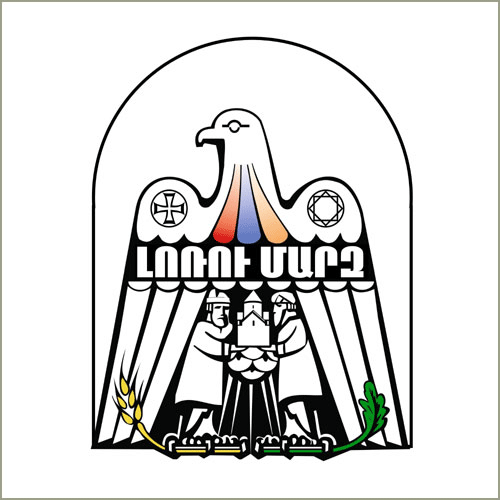
Coat of arms of Lori Province

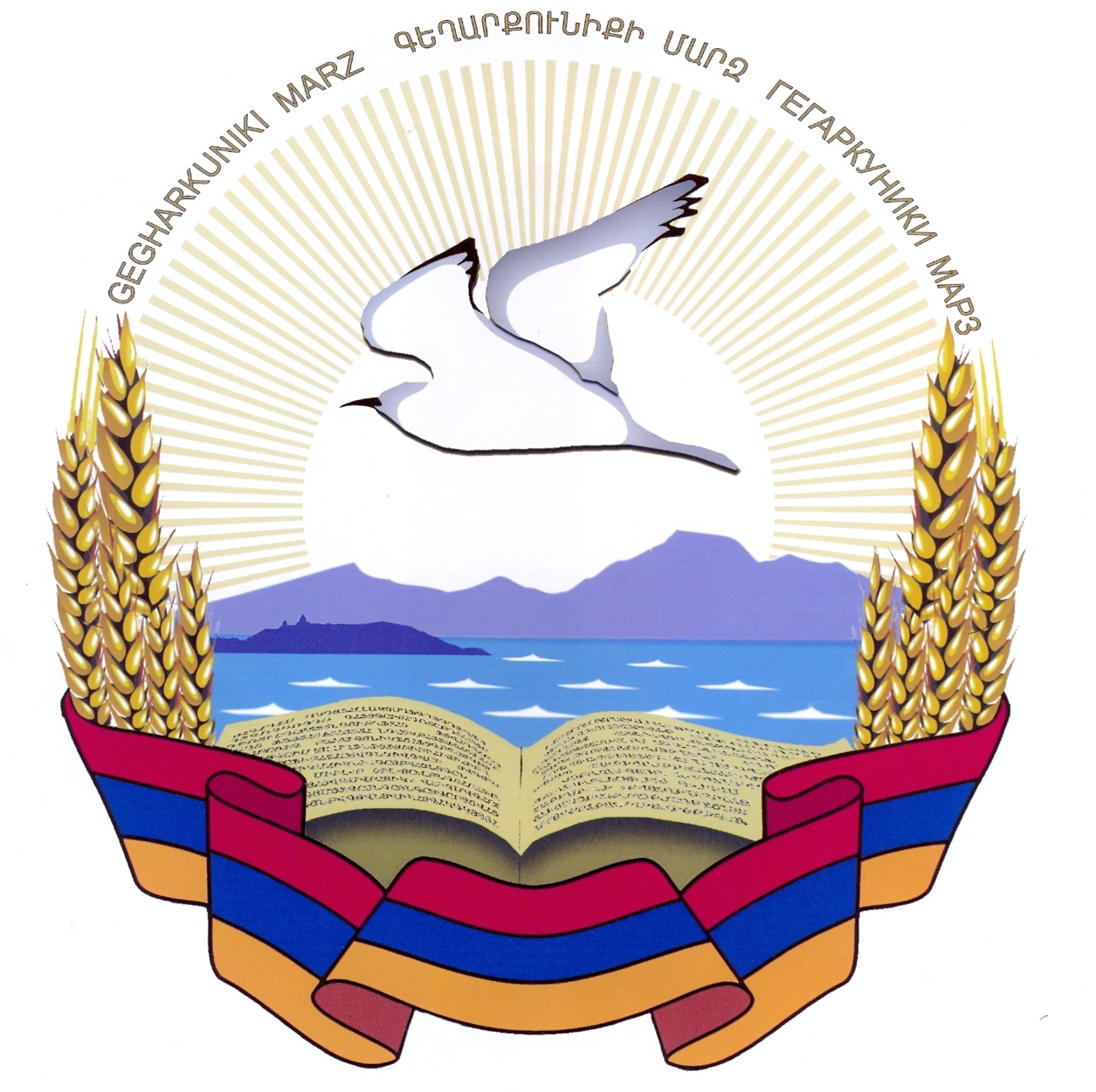
Coat of arms of Gegharkunik Province

=== Municipal emblems and coat of arms ===
Emblem of Yerevan

Emblem of Ejmiatsin

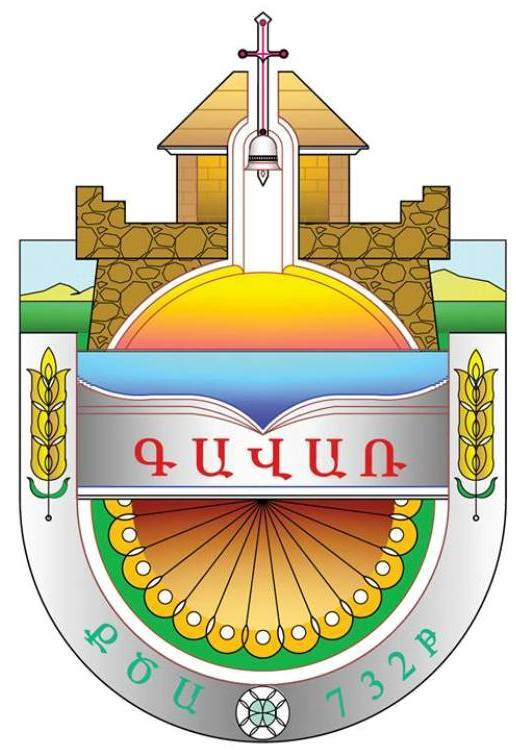
Coat of Arms of Gavar

Coat of arms of Gyumri

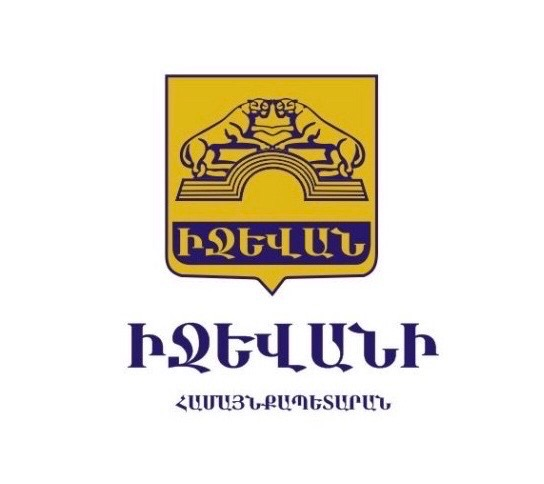
Coat of Arms of Ijevan

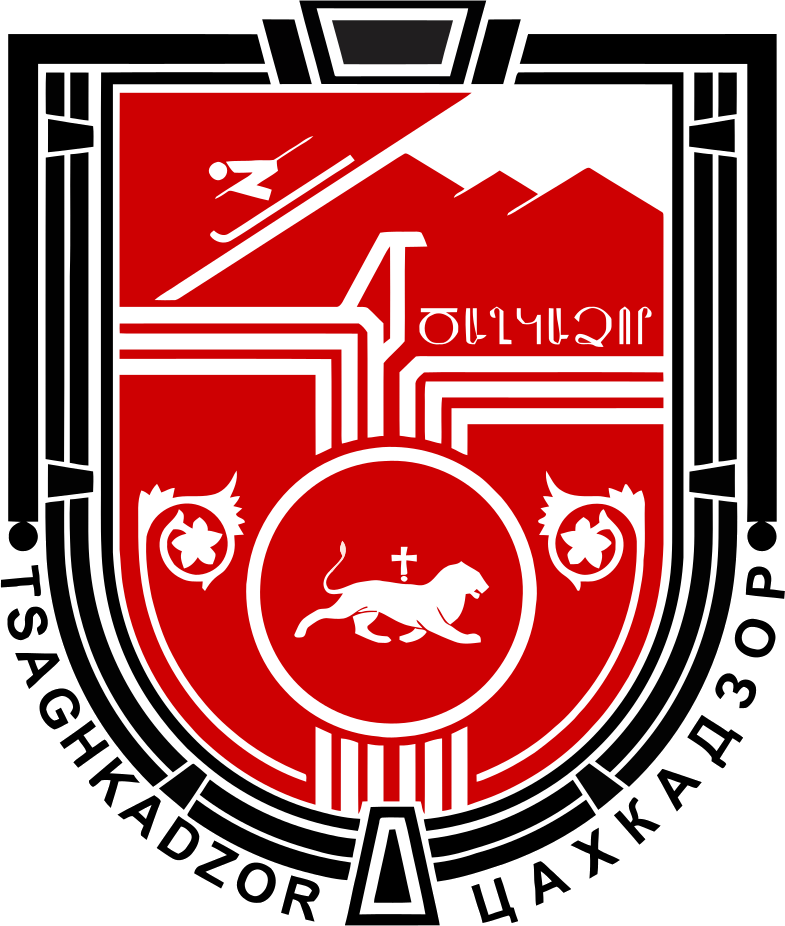
Coat of arms of Tsaghkadzor

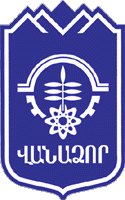
Coat of Arms of Vanadzor

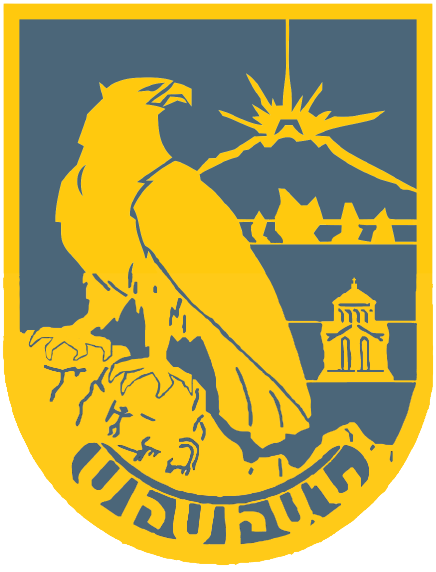
Coat of Arms of Sisian

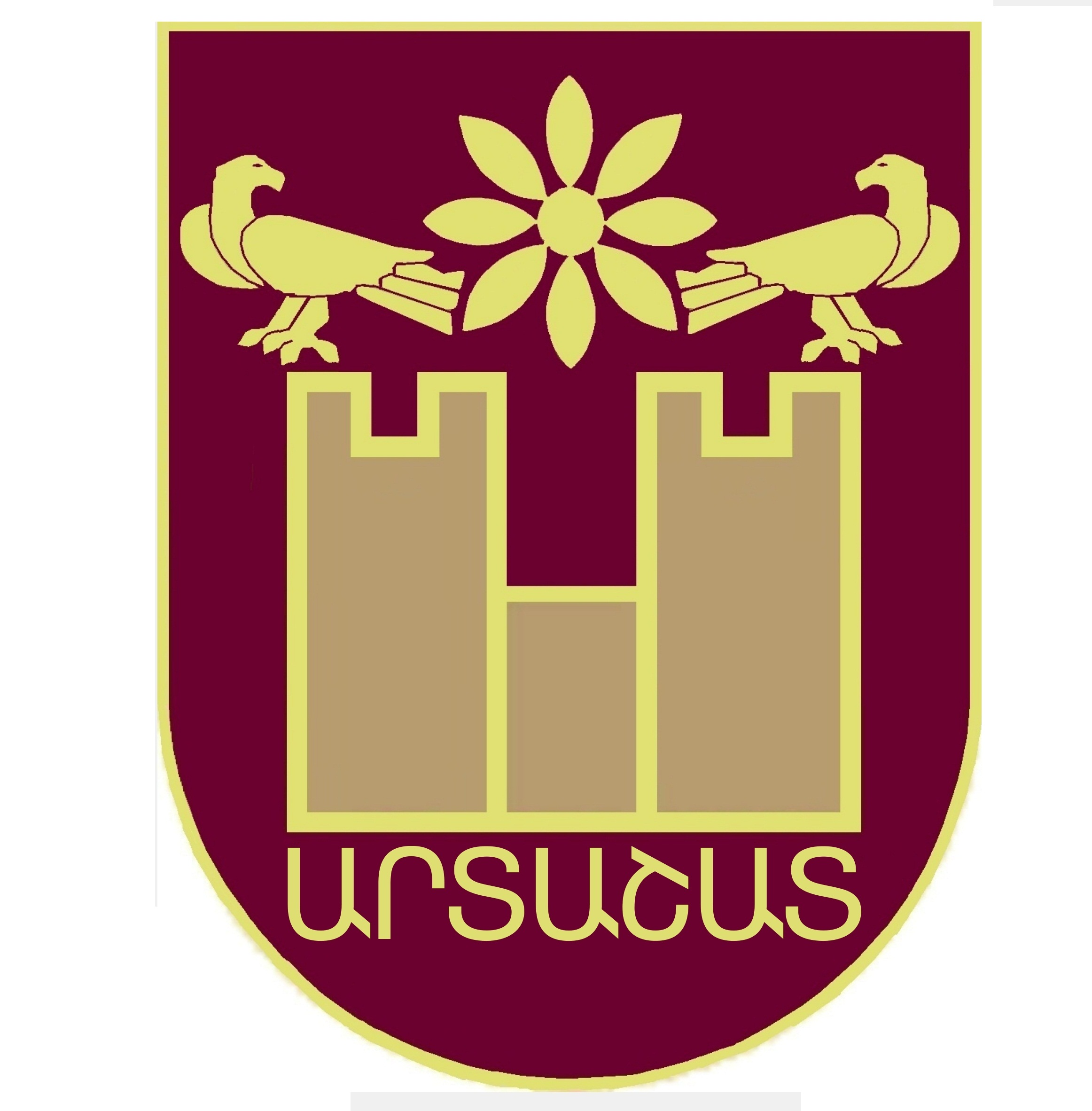
Coat of Arms of Artashat

== Historical ==
=== State ===
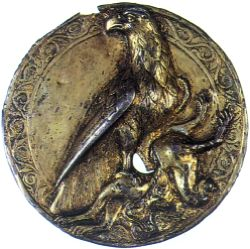
Artaxiad coat of arms on a coin

Coat of arms of the Armenian Kingdom of Cilicia under Hetumids

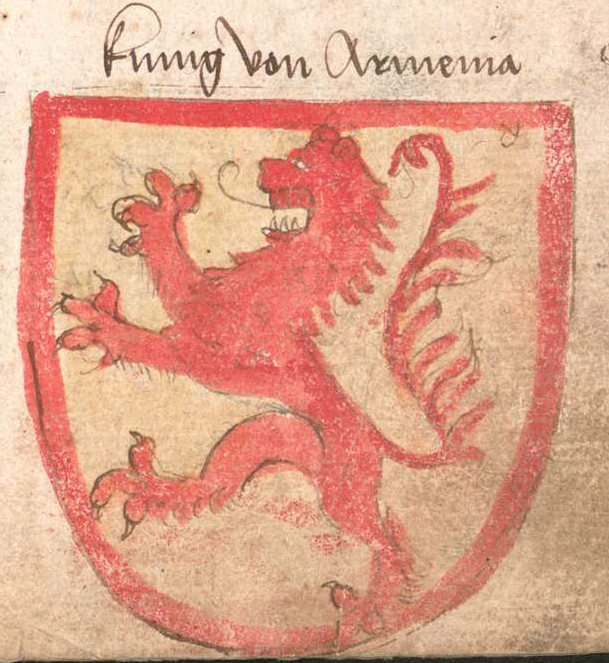
Coat of arms of Armenia from the German armorial, 15th century

Coat of arms of Armenia according to Vakhushti

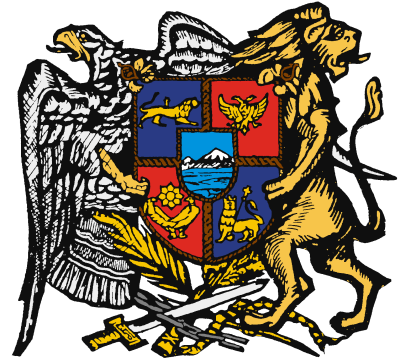
Coat of arms of the First Republic of Armenia

Coat of arms of the Republic of Mountainous Armenia

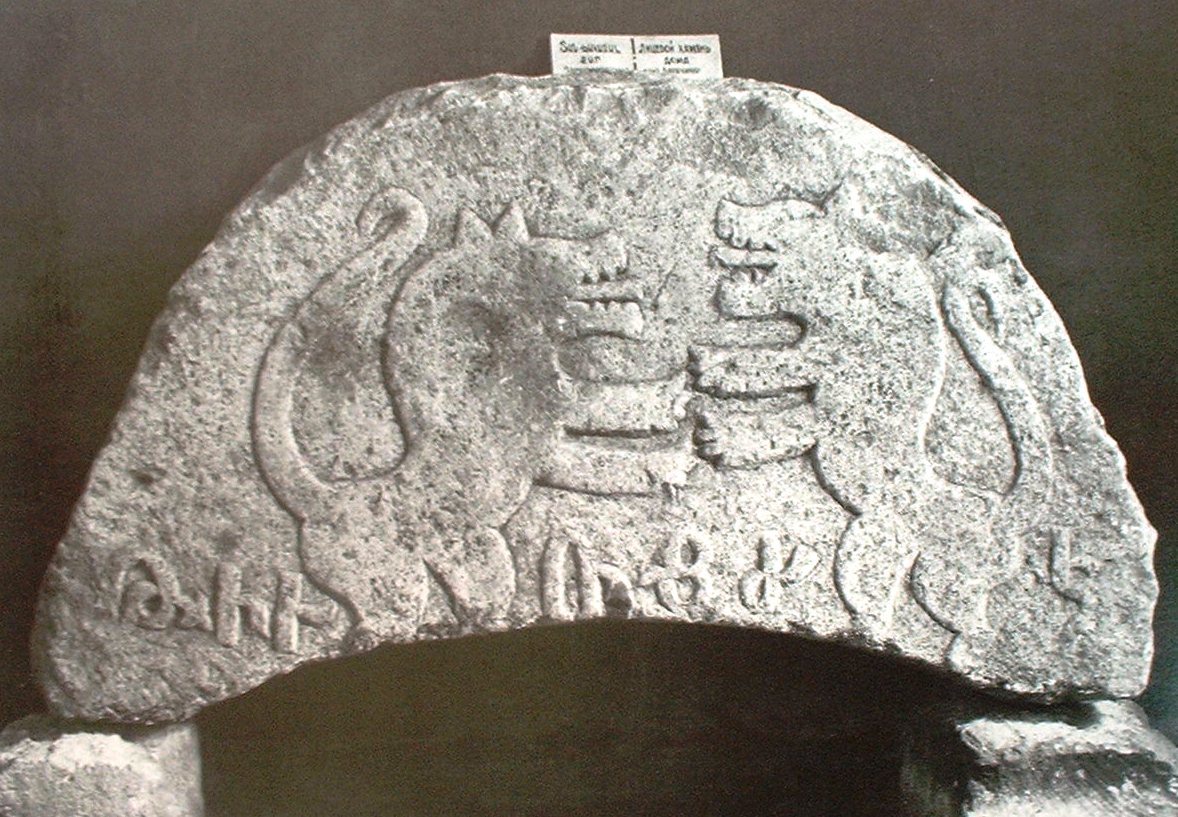
Coat of arms of Gyulistan

==== Regional ====
Coat of arms of proposed Armenian oblast

Coat of arms of the Erivan Governorate

Coat of arms of Kars Oblast

Coat of arms of Armenia in coat of arms of Russian empire

Emblem of the Transcaucasian SFSR (1930-1936)

Emblem of the Armenian SSR (1922)

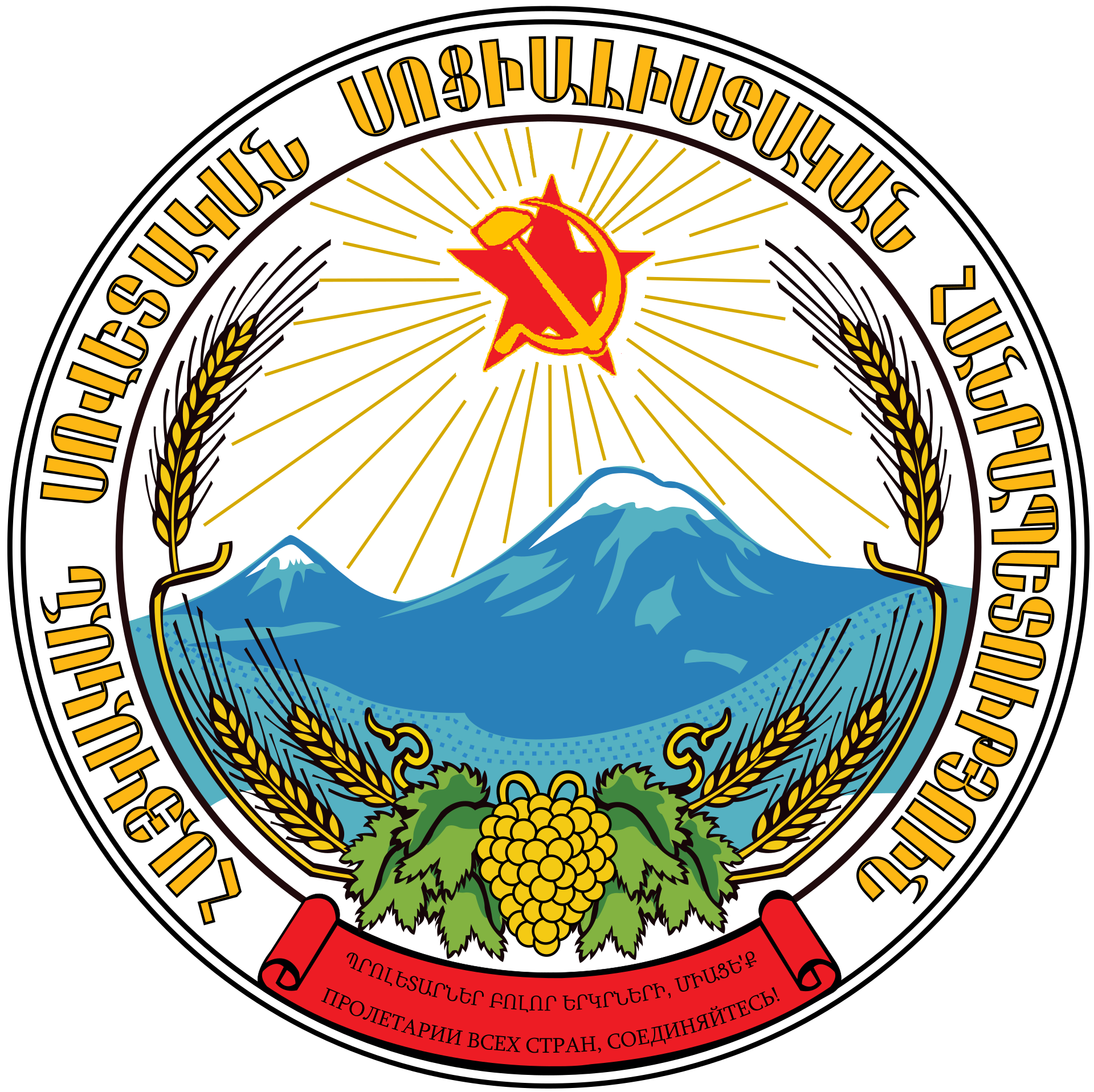
The coat of arms of Soviet Armenia and the independent Republic of Armenia 1936–1992.

==== Proposed ====
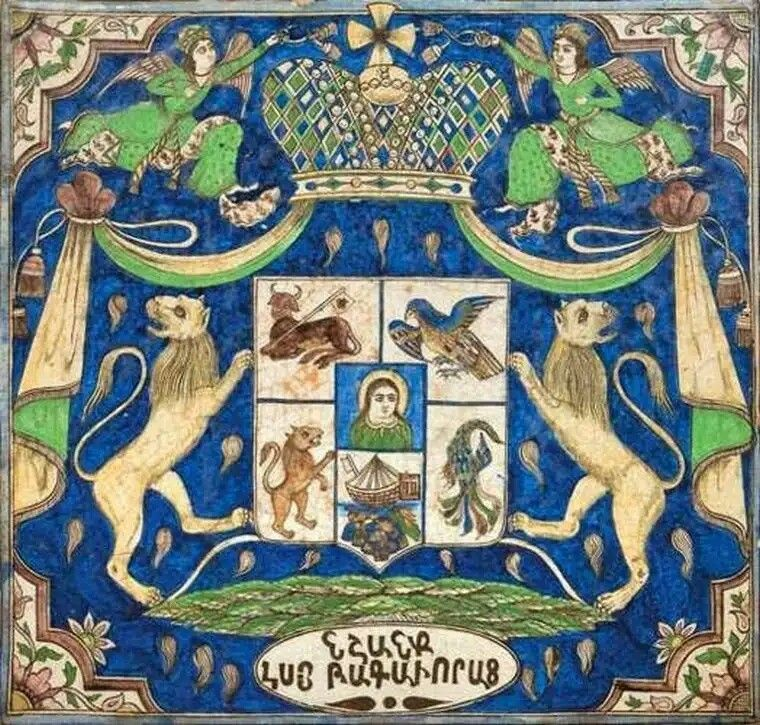
Coat of arms of the Kingdom of Armenia (project) by unknown author (1850)

=== Dynasties and families ===
==== Armenia ====
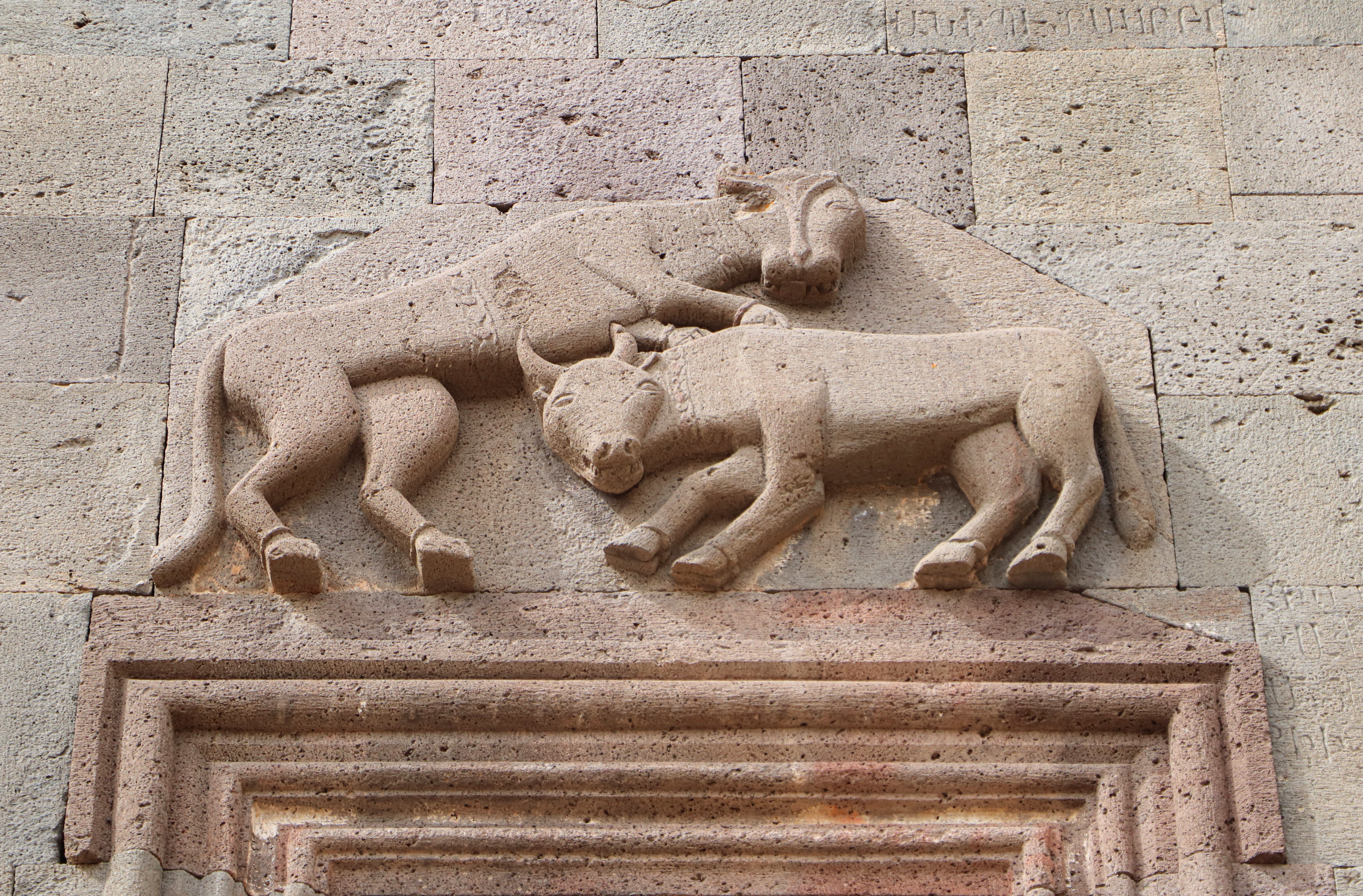
Coat of arms of Zakarids

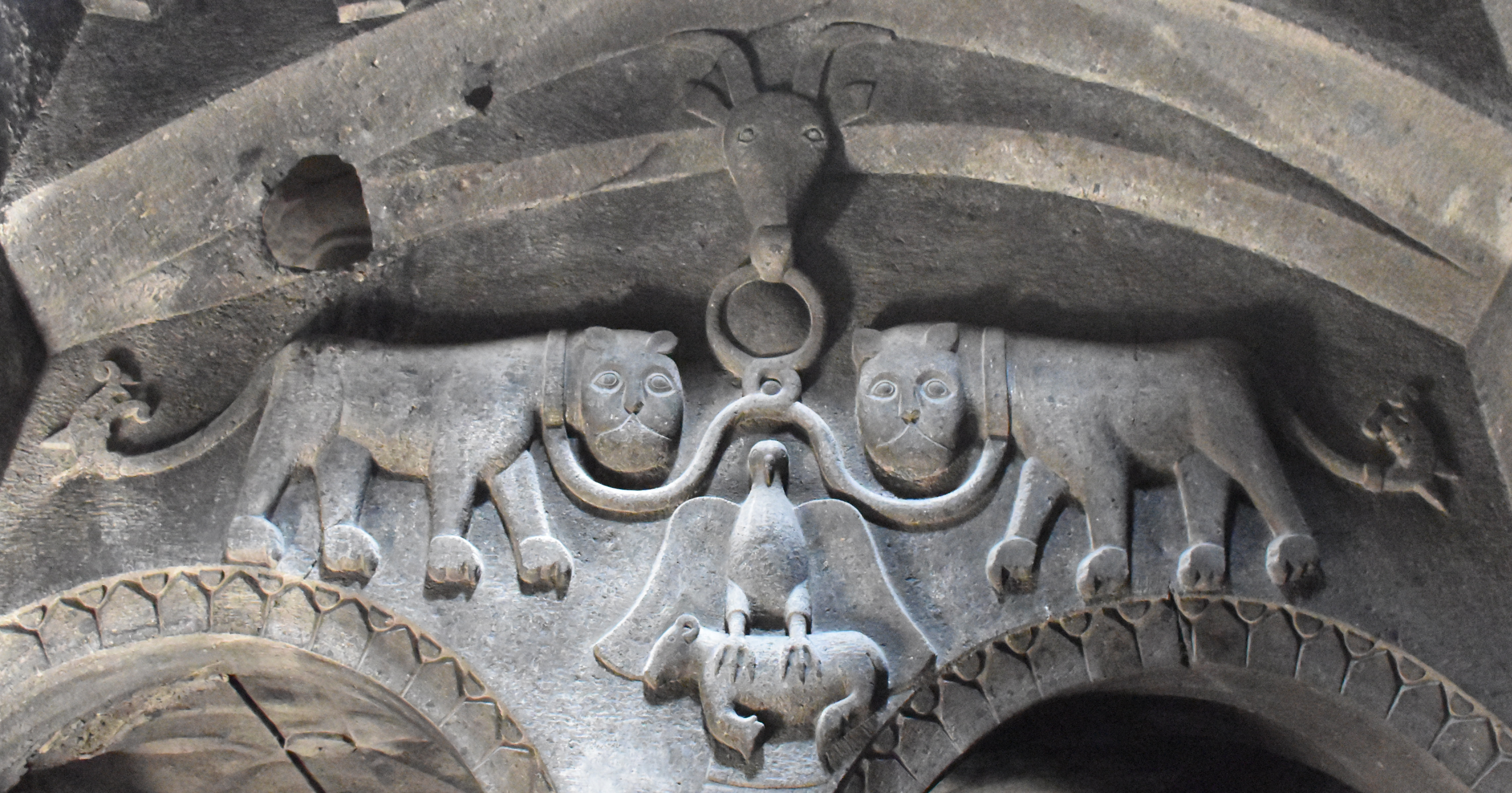
Coat of arms of Proshyans

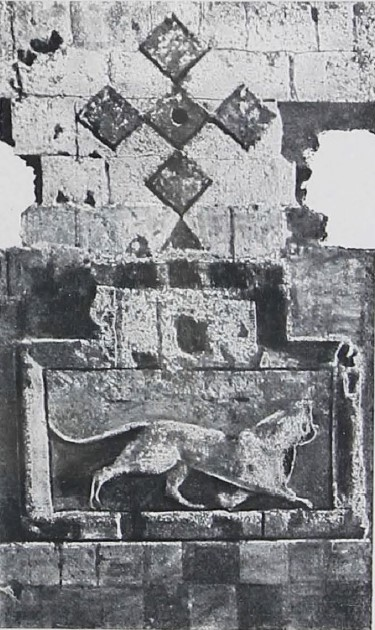
Coat of arms of the Bagratunis or of the city of Ani

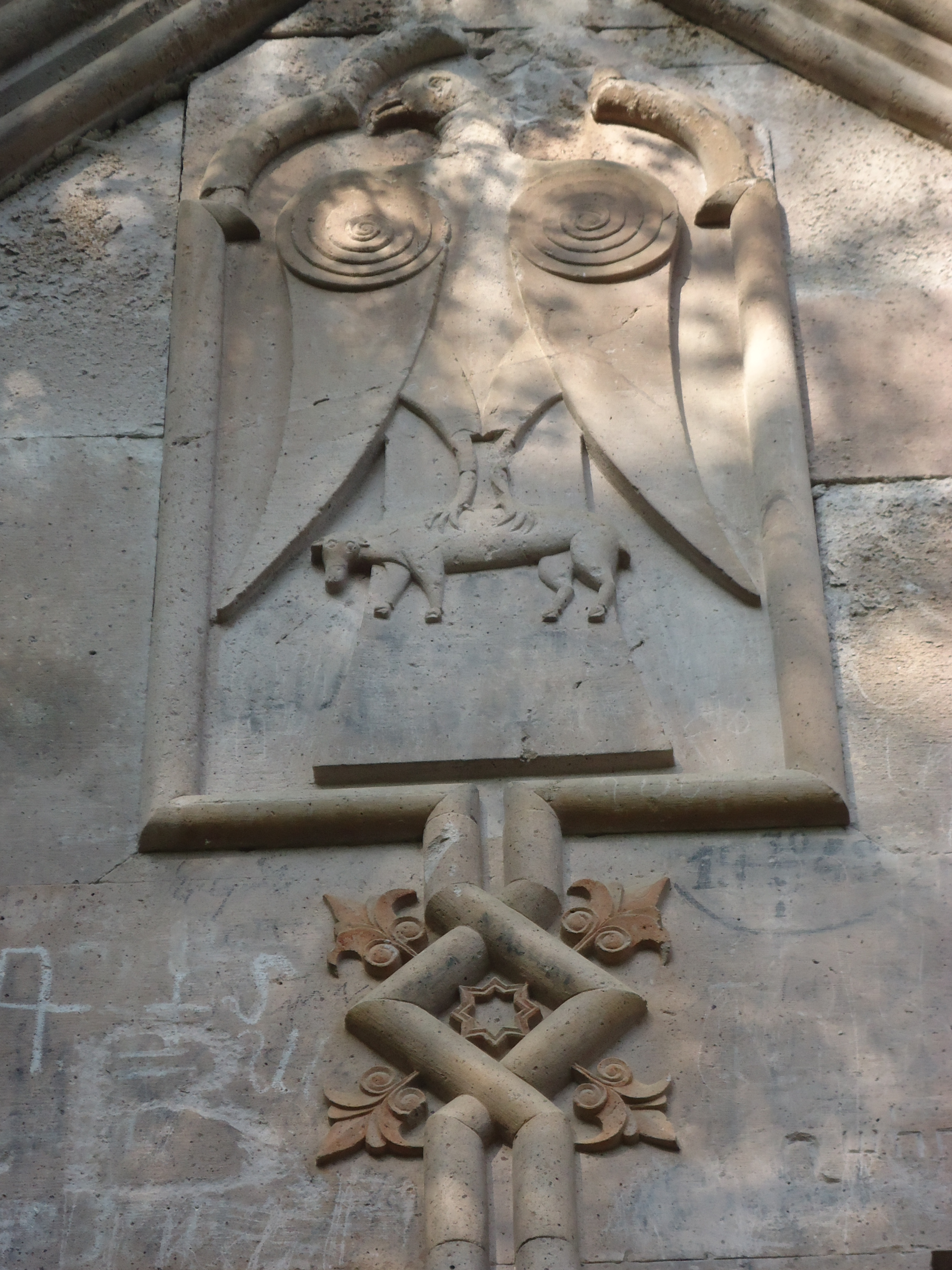
Coat of arms of Hamazaspyan-Mamikonyans

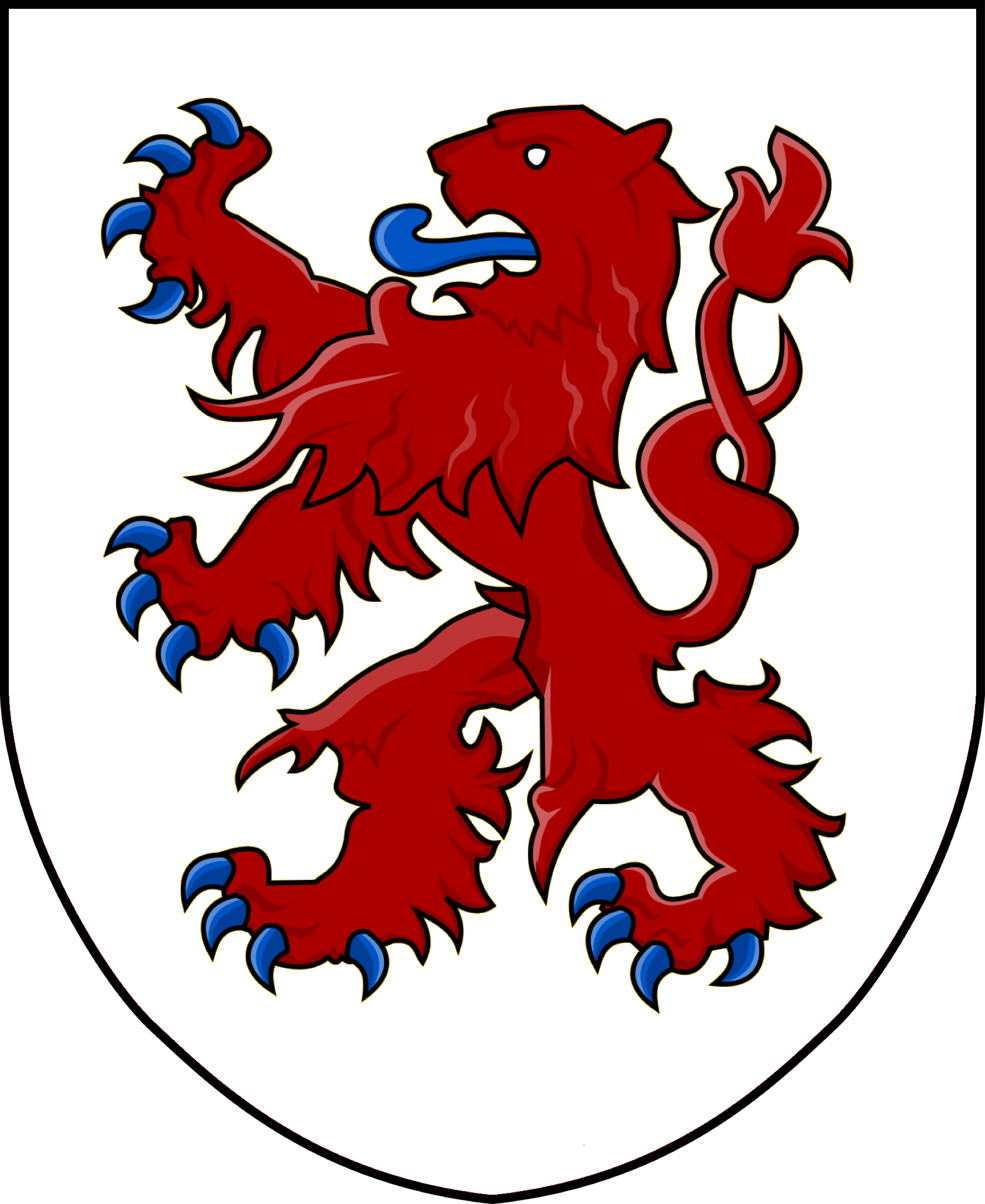
Other version of Coat of arms of Rubenian dynasty

Coat of arms of Leo I

Coat of arms of House of Paluni

Emblem of Hetumian dynasty

Coat of arms of the Lusignan, kings of Cyprus, Jerusalem and Cilicia

==== Russian Empire and Foreign powers ====
Coat of arms of Tumanyans

Coat of arms of Melikyans

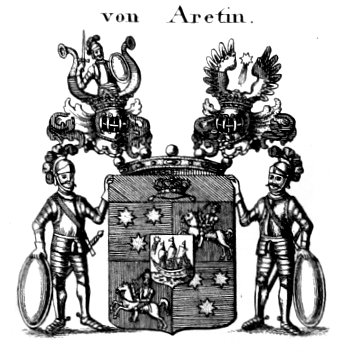
Coat of arms of Arutins

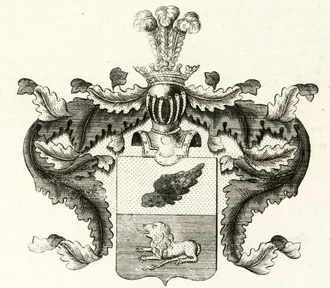
Coat of arms of Lazaryan family

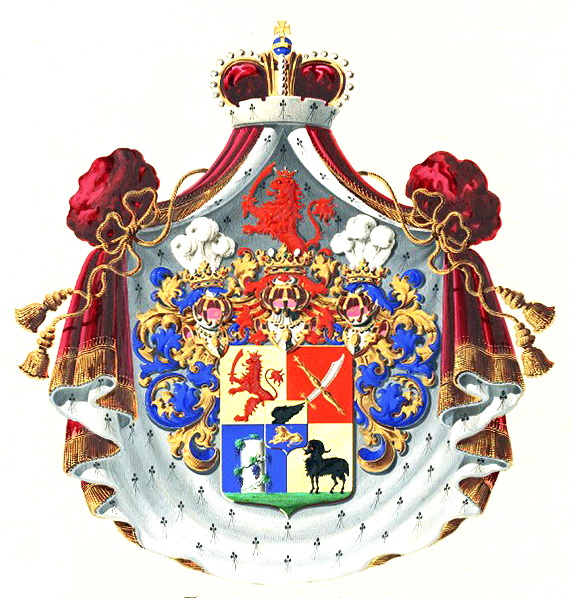
Coat of arms of Princes Abamelek-Lazarev

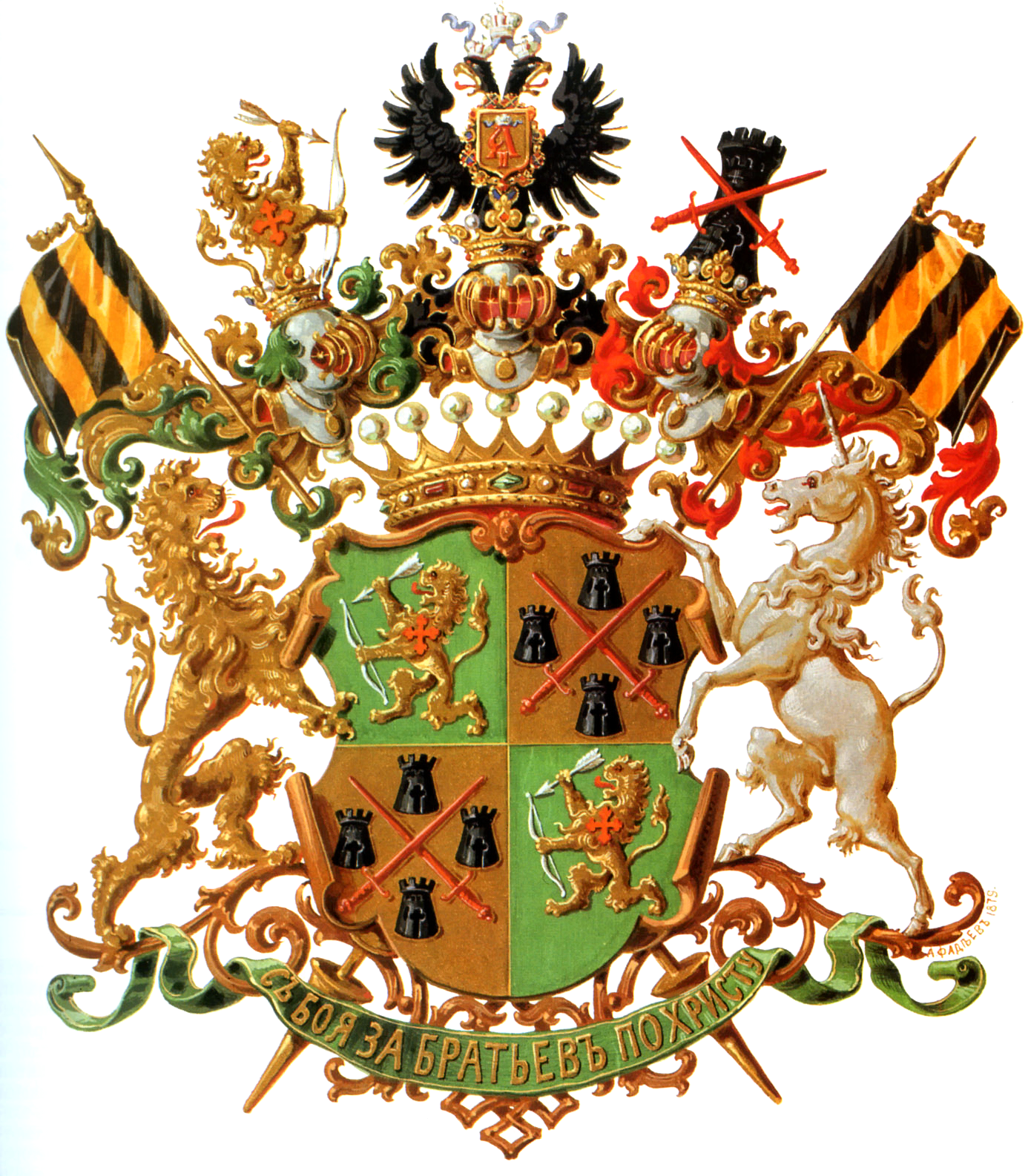
Coat of arms of Melikovs

Argutinsky-Dolgorukov family coat of arms (1798-1862)

== See also ==
- Coat of arms of Armenia
- History of Armenia
- Flag of Armenia
- List of Armenian flags
- National symbols of Armenia
