= List of Armenian flags =

This is a list of flags associated with Armenia.

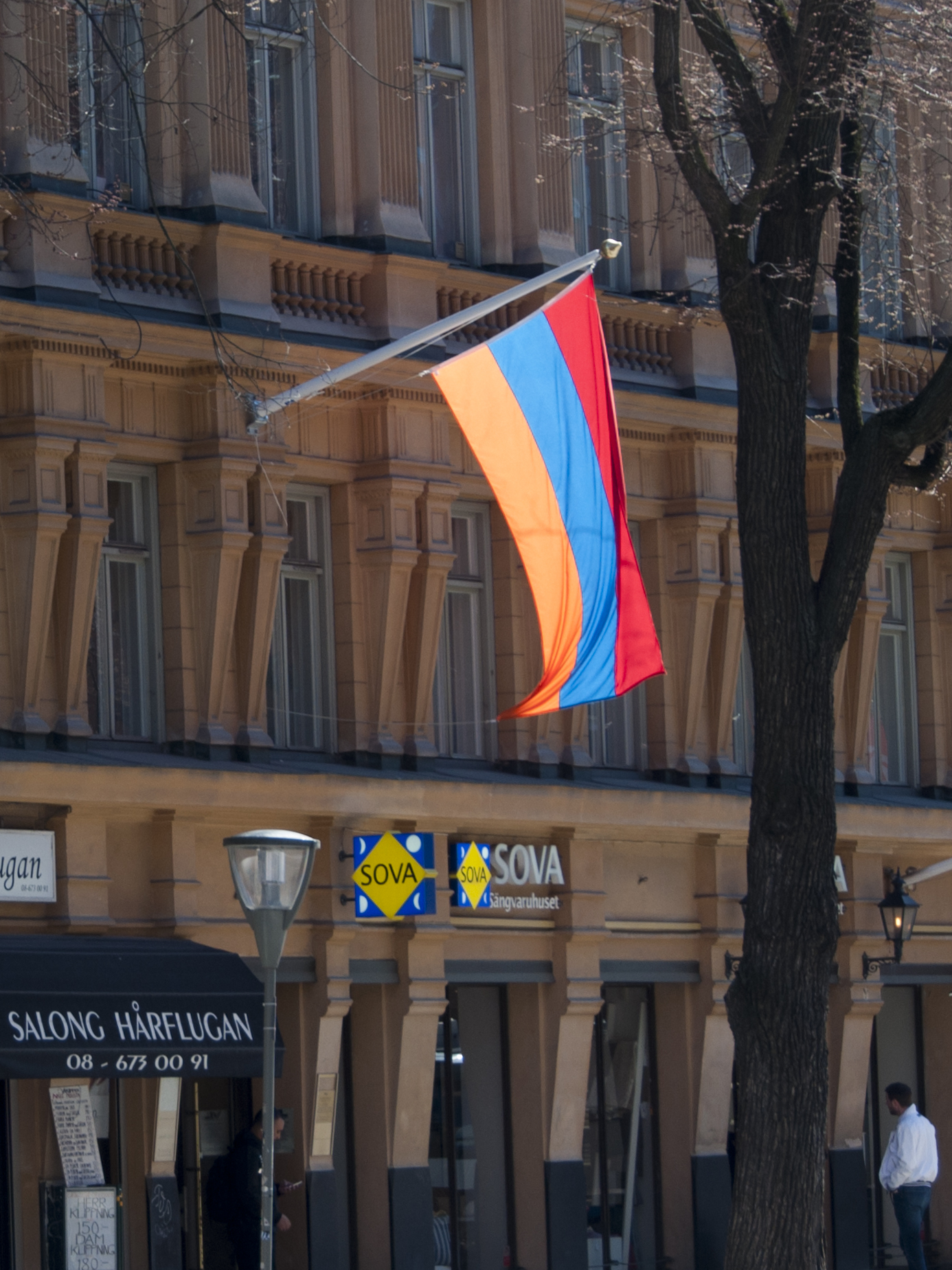
Armenian flag on the embassy in Stockholm

== National flags ==
Flag	Date	Use	Description
	1918–1922; 1990–present	Flag of Armenia	A horizontal tricolour of red, blue, and orange.
	1918–1922; 1990–present	Flag of Armenia (vertical)	

== President's flag ==
Flag	Date	Use	Description
	1990–present	Flag of the president of Armenia	

== Military flags ==
Flag	Date	Use	Description
	2012–present	Flag of the Armenian Ministry of Defense	

== Municipalities and cities ==
=== Present ===
Flag	Date	Description
	2004–present	Flag of Yerevan
		Flag of Vagharshapat
	2011–present	Flag of Gyumri
		Flag of Ashtarak
		Flag of Abovyan
		Flag of Dilijan
		Flag of Artashat
		Flag of Talin

=== Historical ===
Flag	Description
	The flag of Alexandretta as shown on the Jorge Aguiar atlas, now modern İskenderun (1492)
	The flag of medieval Lamos, a port city of the Armenian Kingdom of Cilicia, as shown on the Catalan Atlas (1375)
	The flag of medieval Corycus, a port city of Armenian Kingdom of Cilicia, shown on the Villadestes atlas kept in the Topkapi Museum, as well as in the Book of Knowledge of All Kingdoms (1428)
	The flag of medieval Tarson, a port city of the Armenian Kingdom of Cilicia, as shown on the Villadestes atlas kept in the Topkapi Museum, now modern Tarsus (1428)
	The flag of Medieval Ayas/Lajazzo, a port city of Armenian Kingdom of Cilicia, as shown on the Dulcert atlas, now modern Yumurtalık(1339)
	One of the flags of Sebastia as seen in the Book of Knowledge of All Kingdoms, now modern Sivas
	The flag of Sebastia as seen on the Catalan Atlas and Dulcert atlas, now modern Sivas (1339) (1375)

== Political flags ==
Flag	Date	Description
		Armenian Communist Party
		Armenian Revolutionary Federation
		Civil Contract
Link to file	2020–present	For The Republic Party
Link to file		National Security Party
Link to file	2021–present	Sovereign Armenia Party
		Yezidi National Union ULE
	1975–1991	Armenian Secret Army for the Liberation of Armenia

== Religious flags ==
Flag	Date	Use	Description
		Flag of the Armenian Apostolic Church	

== Historical flags ==
Flag	Date	Description
		Flag attributed to Cilician Armenia as shown on Diogo Homem's Chart (1563)
		Flag of the Armenian Kingdom of Cilicia as recorded by an unknown Franciscan priest
		Flag of the Armenian Kingdom of Cilicia as seen in the Book of Knowledge of All Kingdoms
		The flag of Sargis Pitsak
		The flag and seal of Leo I, King of Armenia that is kept in the Vatican City
	1198–1219	Reconstructed flag of the Armenian Kingdom of Cilicia under the Rubenid dynasty.
	1226–1341	Flag of the Armenian Kingdom of Cilicia under the Hethumid dynasty.
	1341–1375	Flag of the Armenian Kingdom of Cilicia under the Lusignan dynasty.
	1214–1261	Royal Standard of the Principality of Khachen.
	1214	Standard of House of Hasan-Jalalyan.
	1915–1918	Flag of the Republic of Van
	22 April 1918 – 28 May 1918	Flag of the Transcaucasian Democratic Federative Republic
	1918 – February 1922	Flag of the First Republic of Armenia
	Feb. 1922 – Mar. 1922	Flag of the Socialist Soviet Republic of Armenia
	Mar. 1922 – 1936	Flag of the Transcaucasian SFSR
	1936–1940	Flag of the Armenian Soviet Socialist Republic
	1940–1952	Flag of the Armenian Soviet Socialist Republic
	1952–1990	Flag of the Armenian Soviet Socialist Republic
	1952–1990	Reverse flag. All flags of the constituent republics of the Soviet Union did not bear the hammer and sickle on their reverse side.
	1990–1991	Flag of the Second Republic of Armenia
	1991–present	Flag of the Third Republic of Armenia

== Flag proposals ==
Flag	Date	Use
	1885	Flag designed by Father Ghevont Alishan for the Armenian Diaspora in France
	Late 19th century	Second flag of the Armenian Diaspora designed by Father Ghevont Alishan (Mekhitarist Congregation Member)
	1919	One of the flags designed by Martiros Saryan for the First Republic of Armenia
	1919	One of the flags designed by Martiros Saryan for the First Republic of Armenia
	1919	Proposed flag for the First Republic of Armenia
	1919	Proposed flag for the First Republic of Armenia by Vardan Hatsuni of the Mekhitarists.
	1919	Color scheme of the previous flag.

== Armenian people in other countries ==
Flag	Date	Use
	2004–present	Flag of Western Armenia
		Flag of Armenians in Russia
	1992–2023	Flag of Artsakh Armenians
		Flag of Javakheti Armenians
		Flag of Cherkesogai
		Flag of Hemshin people

== See also ==
- Armorial of Armenia
- Flag of Armenia
- Coat of arms of Armenia
