= Flag of Yerevan =

Yerevan
- Proportion: 1:2
- Adopted: September 27, 2004
- Design: Yerevan coat of arms surrounded by twelve red triangles in a circular pattern, all on white background

The flag of Yerevan shows the emblem of Yerevan surrounded by 12 triangles, symbolizing the 12 past capitals of Armenia on a white background, symbolizing clearness and simplicity. The colors used in the flag are the same as in the flag of Armenia, representing the importance of Yerevan as its capital.

The flag's final design was approved on 27 September 2004.

== See also ==
- Flag of Armenia
- List of Armenian flags
- List of city flags in Europe
