= Melikyan =

Melikyan or Melikian (Armenian: Մելիքյան) is an Armenian surname. It may refer to:

- Anna Melikian (born 1976), Russian-Armenian film and TV director, producer, and writer
- Arsen Melikyan (born 1976), Armenian weightlifter
- Hayk Melikyan (born 1980), Armenian pianist
- Papken Melikian (born 1960), Lebanese-Armenian footballer
- Romanos Melikian (1883–1935), Armenian composer
- Siouzana Melikián (born 1986), Mexican actress
- Sofya Melikyan (born 1978), Armenian pianist
- Souren Melikian (born 1936), French-Iranian art historian, art critic, and curator
- Yegishe Melikyan (born 1979), Armenian footballer

== See also ==
- Melikian-Ouzounian School (1921–1953) in Cyprus, founded by the Melikyan family
- Melikov, the Russified version of Melikyan
