= Emblem of Yerevan =

- Armiger: Yerevan

The Emblem of Yerevan, the capital and largest city of Armenia, shows a winged Erebuni lion with a bronze shield having a blue circumference. The lion has the tree of life as a crown, holds a power staff, and has a shield encompassing the symbol of eternity and the Ararat mountains on its chest. The text with the blue background below it spells Yerevan in Armenian letters.

The emblem's final design was approved on 27 September 2004 and is still used today by the Yerevan City Council.

== See also ==
- Flag of Yerevan
