= Flag of Armenia =

Republic of Armenia
- եռագույն ('tricolor')
- Use: National flag
- Proportion: 1:2
- Adopted: 1 August 1918 (re-adopted on 24 August 1990)
- Design: A horizontal tricolour of red, blue, and orange
- Designed by: Stepan Malkhasyants
- Use: Presidential standard
- Proportion: 1:2
- Design: A horizontal tricolour of red, blue, and orange, defaced with the presidential seal at its centre.

The national flag of Armenia (Armenian: Հայաստանի դրոշ, romanized: Hayastani drosh), sometimes referred to as the Armenian tricolor (հայոց or հայկական եռագույն, hayots or haykakan yerraguyn), consists of three horizontal bands of equal width, red on the top, blue in the middle, and orange on the bottom. The Armenian Supreme Soviet (parliament) adopted the current flag on 24 August 1990, which was originally used during the First Republic of Armenia (1918–20).

Throughout history, there have been many variations of the Armenian flag. In ancient times, Armenian dynasties were represented by different symbolic animals displayed on their flags. In the twentieth century, various Soviet flags represented the Armenian SSR.

The meanings of the colours are interpreted in many different ways. The red stands for the Armenian highlands, the Armenian people's continued struggle for survival, maintenance of the Christian faith and Armenia's independence and freedom, blue is for the peaceful Armenian skies, and orange represents the nation's talent and hard work.

== Design ==
Construction of Flag of Armenia

The symbolism of the flag's colors is officially given in the 2006 law on the National Flag of Armenia:

The red emblematizes the Armenian Highland, the Armenian people's continued struggle for survival, maintenance of the Christian faith, Armenia's independence and freedom. The blue emblematizes the will of the people of Armenia to live beneath peaceful skies. The orange emblematizes the creative talent and hard-working nature of the people of Armenia.

Armenian flag with official CMYK colors

In 2012, the Armenian National Institute of Standards (SARM) issued specifications about the construction and colours on the national flag:

Scheme	Red	Blue	Orange
Pantone	485	286	1235
CMYK	0–100–100–0	100–80–0–0	0–35–100–0
RGB	217–0–18	0–51–160	242–168–0
HEX	#D90012	#0033A0	#F2A800

== History ==
Today's tricolour flag bears little resemblance to the earliest Armenian 'flags'. In ancient times, armies went into battle behind carvings mounted on poles. The carvings might represent a dragon, an eagle, a lion or "some mysterious object of the gods".

=== Middle Ages ===
During the invasion of the Arabs, despite stronger resistance than even the Persians, Armenia came under the control of the Umayyad Caliphate, and on its territory the Armenian Emirate was created, stretching from modern Baku and Derbent in the east to the sources of the Euphrates in the west and from the Terek River in the north to Lake Urmia in the south. The emirate received a flag, which was a black field without any additional elements on it.

In 885, Armenia gained independence and the flag, which is a dark red canvas with the image of a white leopard and a Christian cross on it. Now the "Ani leopard" from this flag is also an element of the flag and coat of arms of the second largest city and cultural capital of Armenia - Gyumri. Unlike the flags of Greater Armenia, the flag of Armenian Kingdom was not the flag of the ruling dynasty.

One of the first atlases to contain an Armenian state, a 1339 map by Angelino Dulcert depicts the Armenian Kingdom of Cilicia with two flags. The first flag is that of the flag of Ayas or Lajazzo and has a white field, with a red animal in the center. The second is the flag of Lamos has a black field, broken by a grid of white crosses. The flag of Lamos would later appear in the 1375 Catalan Atlas along with the flag of Alexandretta which has a white field with a red animal in the center, created the same year the Kingdom of Cilicia fell to the Ottoman Empire. Another variation of the flag of Ayas would appear on the 1325 portolan chart of Angelino de Dalorto, featuring a red background with a white animal in the center and black stripes. On a Jorge Aguiar's portolan chart, Alexandretta would be featured again with a different scheme, red and yellow diagonal stripes. Sebastia was also featured on the Catalan Atlas and Dulcert Atlas, with the right side of the flag boasting a white square with a red cross and for smaller red crosses, similar to the modern flag of Georgia, with a yellow section attached to the left side bearing a red square, that of the Ilkhanate, most likely representing Ilkhanate occupation. On a 1428 atlas by Johas de Villadestes kept in the Topkapi Museum, the flags of Corycus, Alexandretta, and Tarson appear. With Alexandretta bearing a yellow flag with a green circle and yellow lion in the center, Corycus bearing a black field with a large white cross and four smaller white crosses in the open black fields, and Tarson bearing a brown field with, cross hatched on the right side with black stripes and overlated with seven gold crosses, while the right remains brown and bears two gold crosses. According to the Book of Knowledge of All Kingdoms, the flag of Cilician Armenia is show with the bottom half gray with five gold crowns or Fleur-de-lis with the top of the flag being white with a large red cross and four smaller crosses similar to the Jerusalem cross. The flag of Sebastia is also recorded in the same source with three given variants, all of which feature a white background with a red cross dividing the white and four smaller red crosses in the spaces. The flag of Corycus is also found in the Book of Knowledge of All Kingdoms as well with the same design previously described. In a Portuguese armorial produced in 1416, the flag of Cilician Armenia under the House of Lusignan is shown. The banner divided into four parts, the top left depicting a gray background with a golden Jerusalem cross, the top right showing a red lion rampant on top of a striped blue and white background representing the Lusignans, the bottom right showing a white background with a red lion rampnt, and crowned with a golden crown representing the Rubenids, and the bottom left showing a red background with a yellow or gold lion with a crown representing the Hethumids.

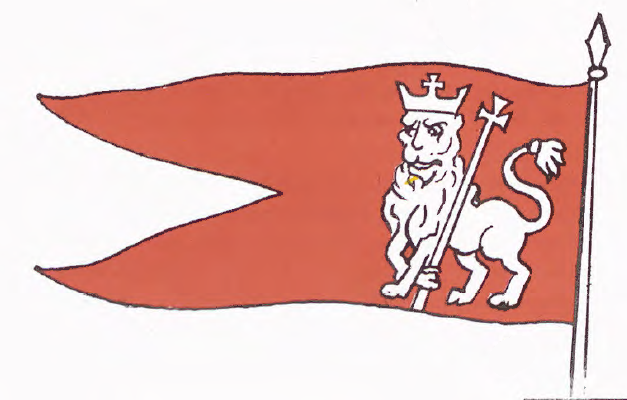
The flag and seal of Leo I, King of Armenia that is kept in the Vatican City

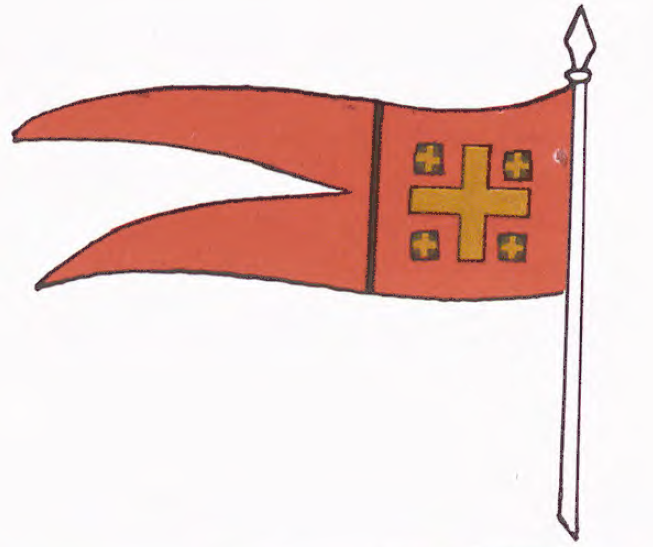
The flag of Sargis Pitsak

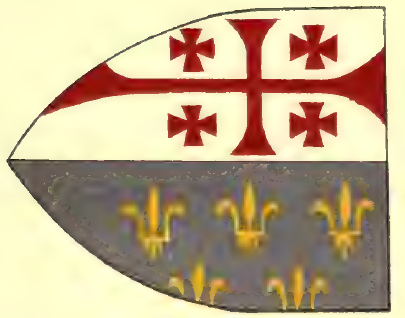
Flag of the Armenian Kingdom of Cilicia as seen in the Book of Knowledge of All Kingdoms

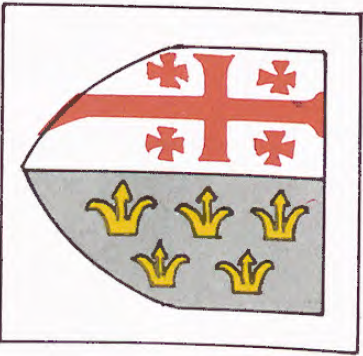
Flag of the Armenian Kingdom of Cilicia as recorded by an unknown Franciscan priest

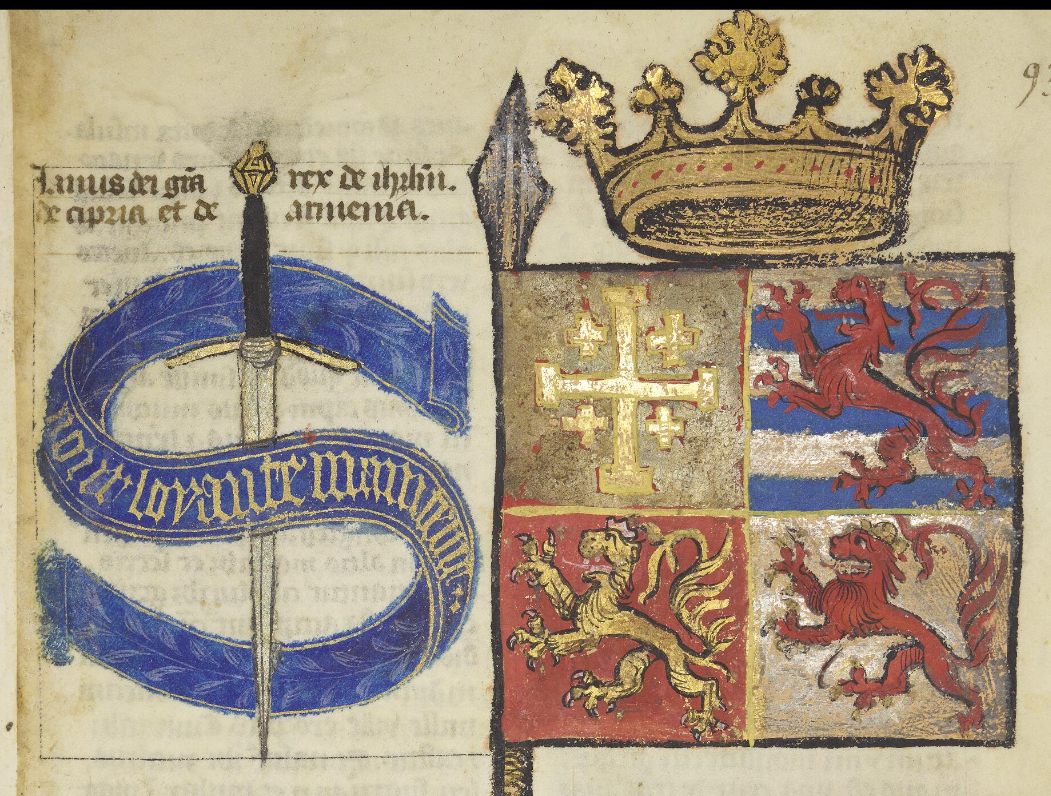
The flag of the Armenian Kingdom of Cilicia under the House of Lusignan according to Armorial Latin MS 28 by a Portuguese herald (1416)

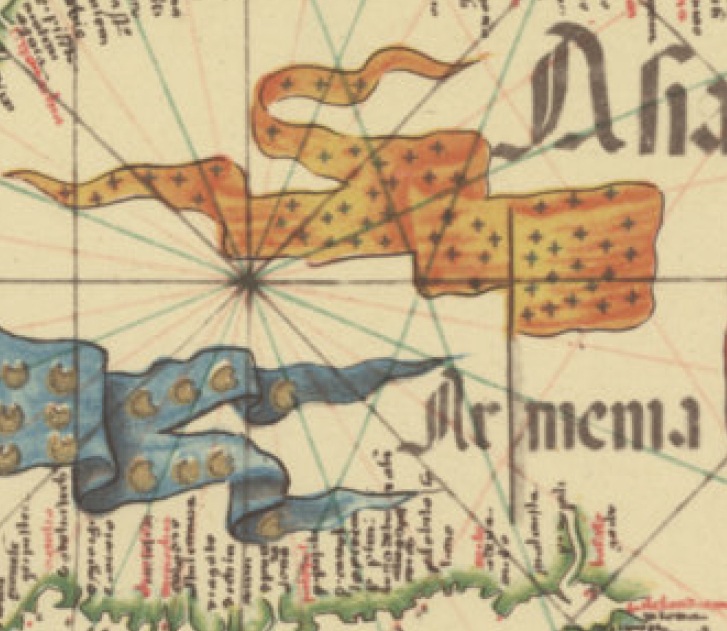
Flag attributed to Cilician Armenia as shown on Diogo Homem's Chart (1563)

Reconstruction of the Royal Standard of Grand Prince Hasan-Jalalyan Vahtangian (1214−1261)

Reconstruction of the flag of the Hasan-Jalalyan dynasty (1214−)

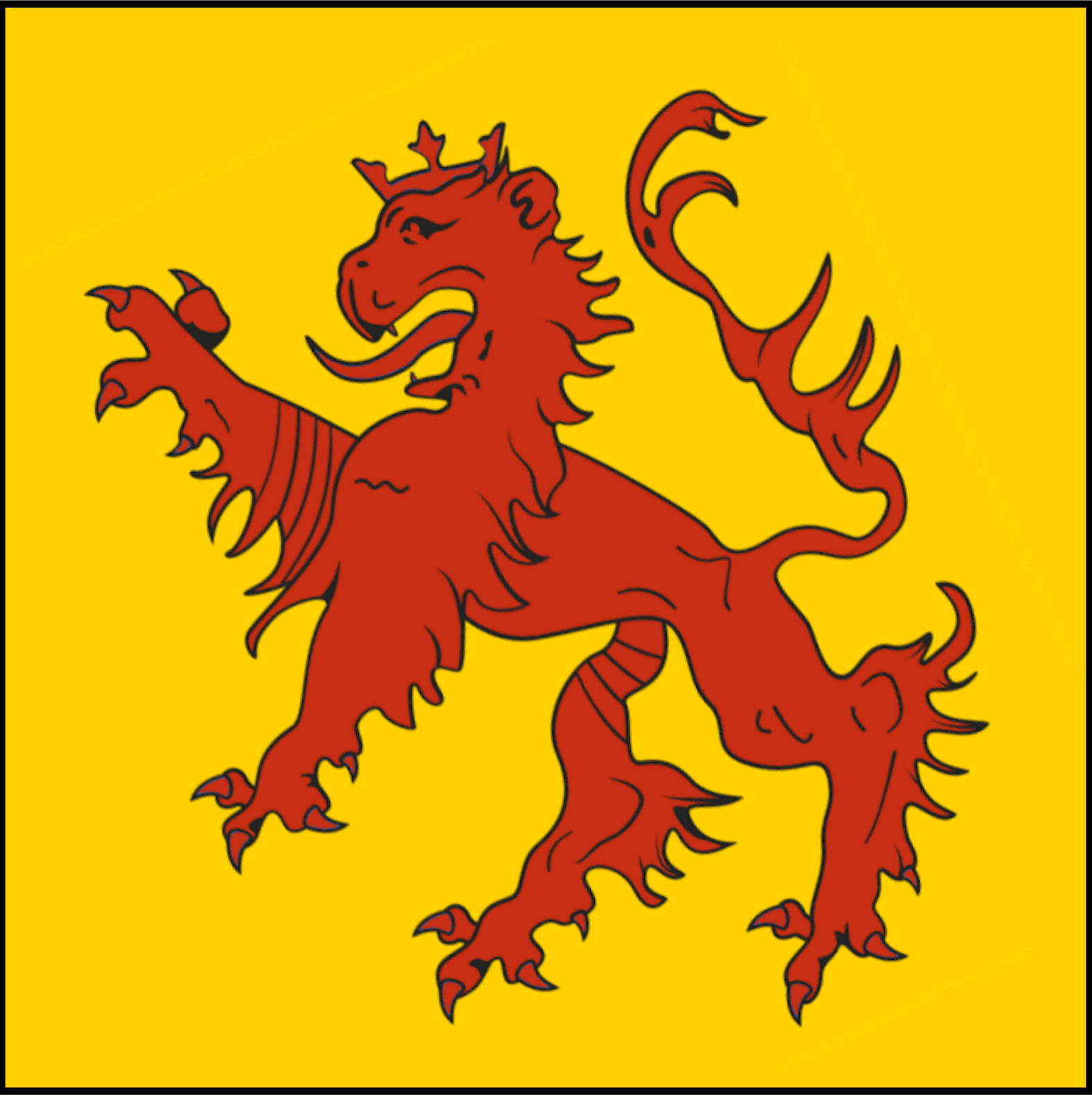
The flag of medieval Alexandretta, a port city of Armenian Kingdom of Cilicia, as shown on the Catalan Atlas, now modern İskenderun (1375)

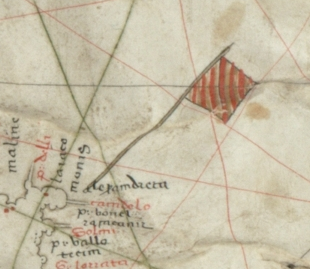
The flag of Alexandretta as shown on the Jorge Aguiar atlas, now modern İskenderun (1492)

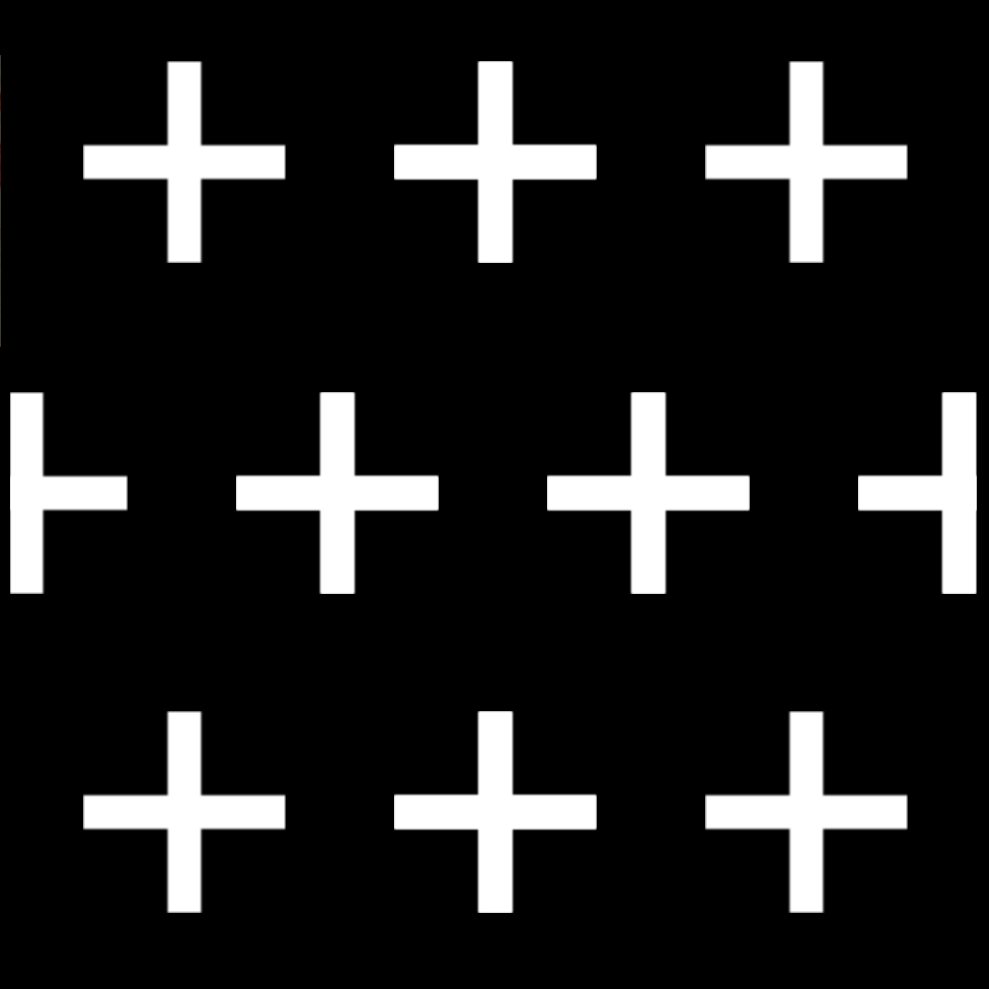
The flag of medieval Lamos, a port city of the Armenian Kingdom of Cilicia, as shown on the Catalan Atlas (1375)

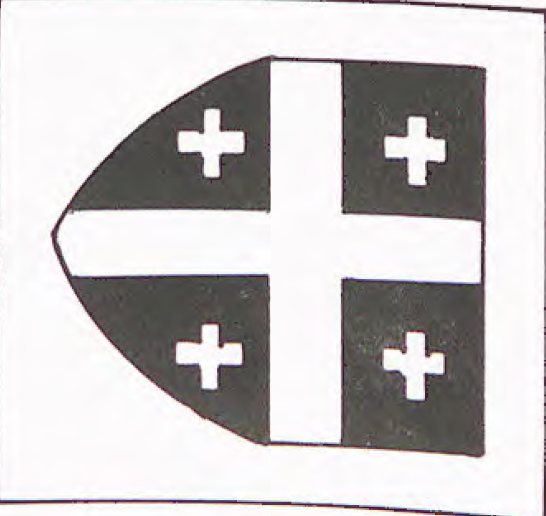
The flag of medieval Corycus, a port city of Armenian Kingdom of Cilicia, shown on the Villadestes atlas kept in the Topkapi Museum, as well as in the Book of Knowledge of All Kingdoms (1428)

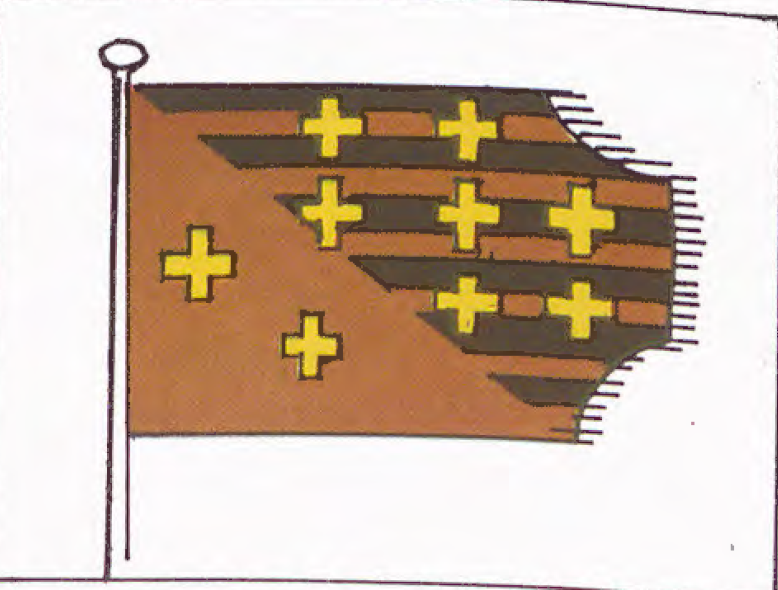
The flag of medieval Tarson, a port city of the Armenian Kingdom of Cilicia, as shown on the Villadestes atlas kept in the Topkapi Museum, now modern Tarsus (1428)

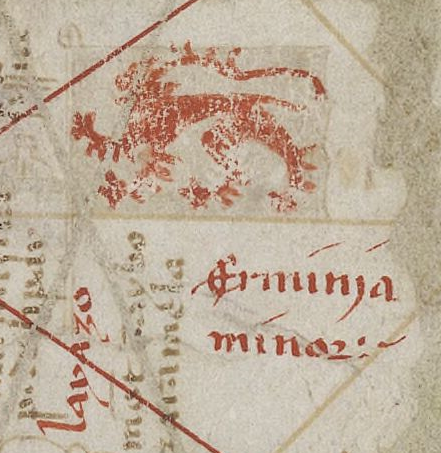
The flag of Medieval Ayas/Lajazzo, a port city of Armenian Kingdom of Cilicia, as shown on the Dulcert atlas, now modern Yumurtalık (1339)

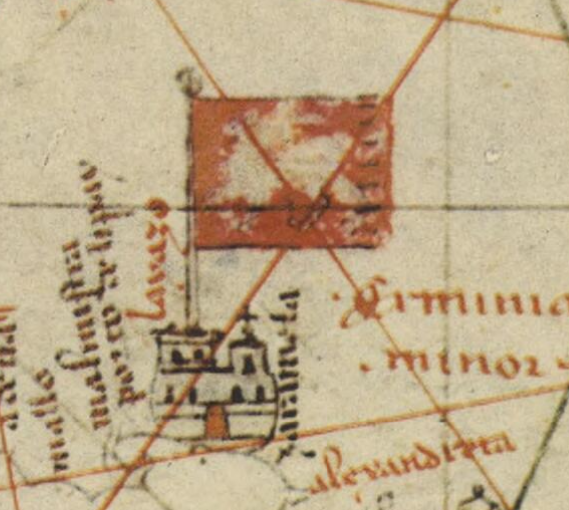
The flag of Ayas as shown on the Dalaroto atlas, now modern Yumurtalık (1325)

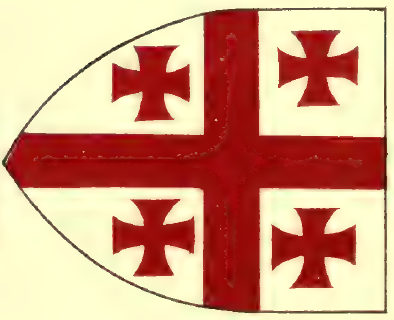
One of the flags of Sebastia as seen in the Book of Knowledge of All Kingdoms, now modern Sivas

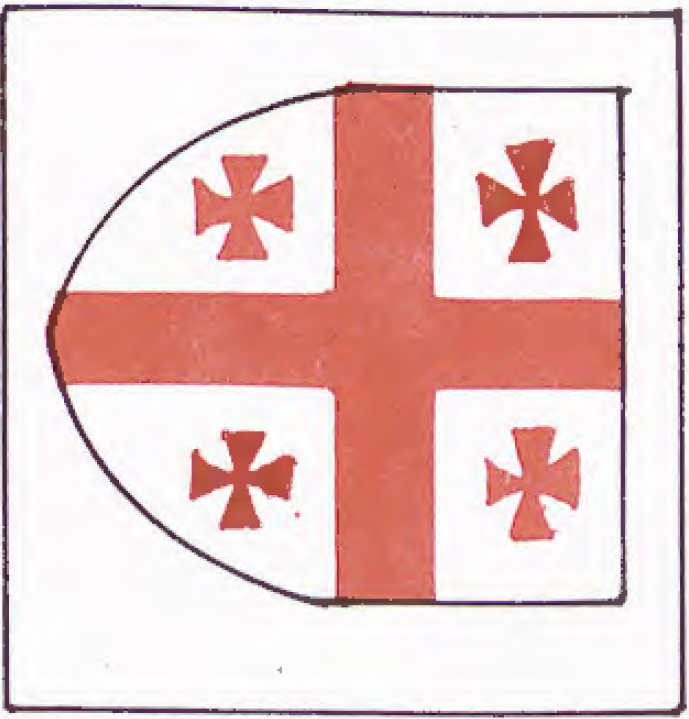
One of the flags of Sebastia as per the as well as in the Book of Knowledge of All Kingdoms, now modern Sivas

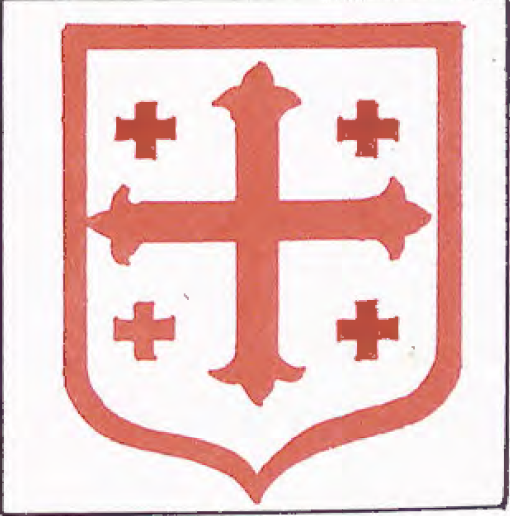
One of the flags of Sebastia as per the as well as in the Book of Knowledge of All Kingdoms, now modern Sivas

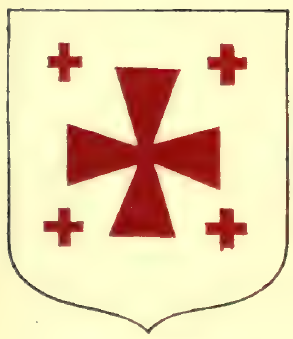
One of the flags of Sebastia as seen in the Book of Knowledge of All Kingdoms, now modern Sivas

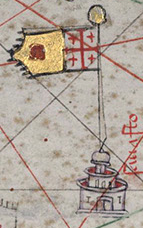
The flag of Sebastia as seen on the Catalan Atlas and Dulcert atlas, now modern Sivas (1339) (1375)

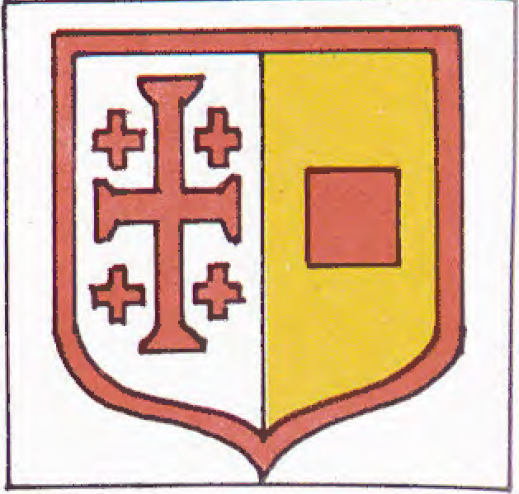
One of the flags of Sebastia, now modern Sivas

=== 19th century ===
After Armenia was split between the Persian and the Ottoman Empire, the idea of an Armenian flag ceased to exist for some time. The Armenian Catholic priest Father Ghevont Alishan created a new flag for Armenia in 1885, after the Armenian Students Association of Paris requested one for the funeral of the French writer Victor Hugo. Alishan's first design was a horizontal tricolour, the top band was red, symbolizing the first Sunday of Easter (called "Red" Sunday), followed by a green band to represent the "Green" Sunday of Easter, and finally an arbitrary colour, white, was chosen to complete the combination. While in France, Alishan also designed a second flag. Its colours were red, green, and either blue or yellow, representing the rainbow that Noah saw after landing on Mount Ararat. During the Russo-Persian War of 1826–1828, the Armenian volunteer militias had three battle flags, boasting the Double-headed eagle, Noah's Ark, and a depiction of Jesus Christ.

Reconstruction of Alishan's first flag (1885)

Reconstruction of Alishan's second flag

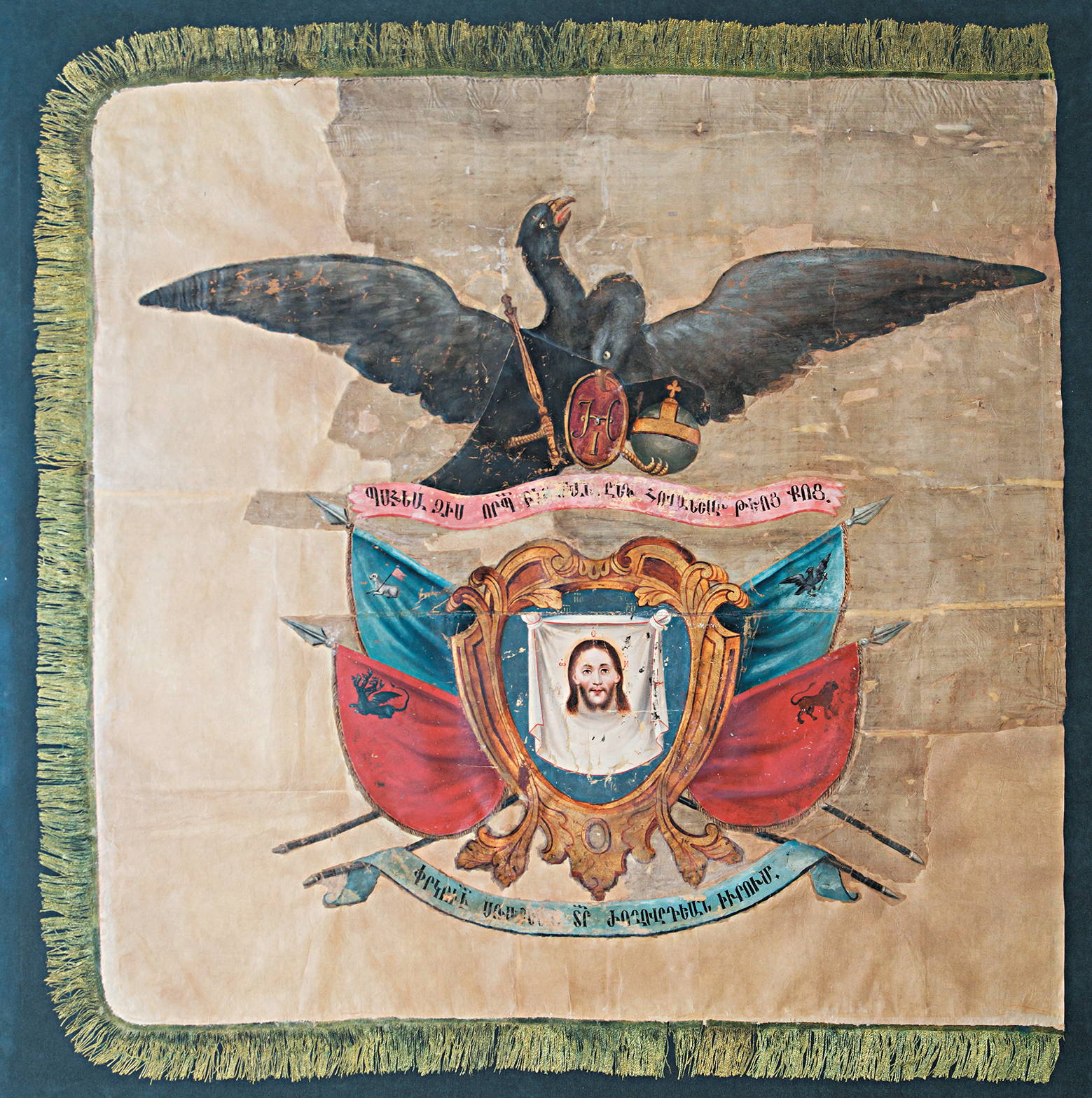
One of the battle flags of the Armenian volunteer militia during the Russo-Persian War of 1826–1828

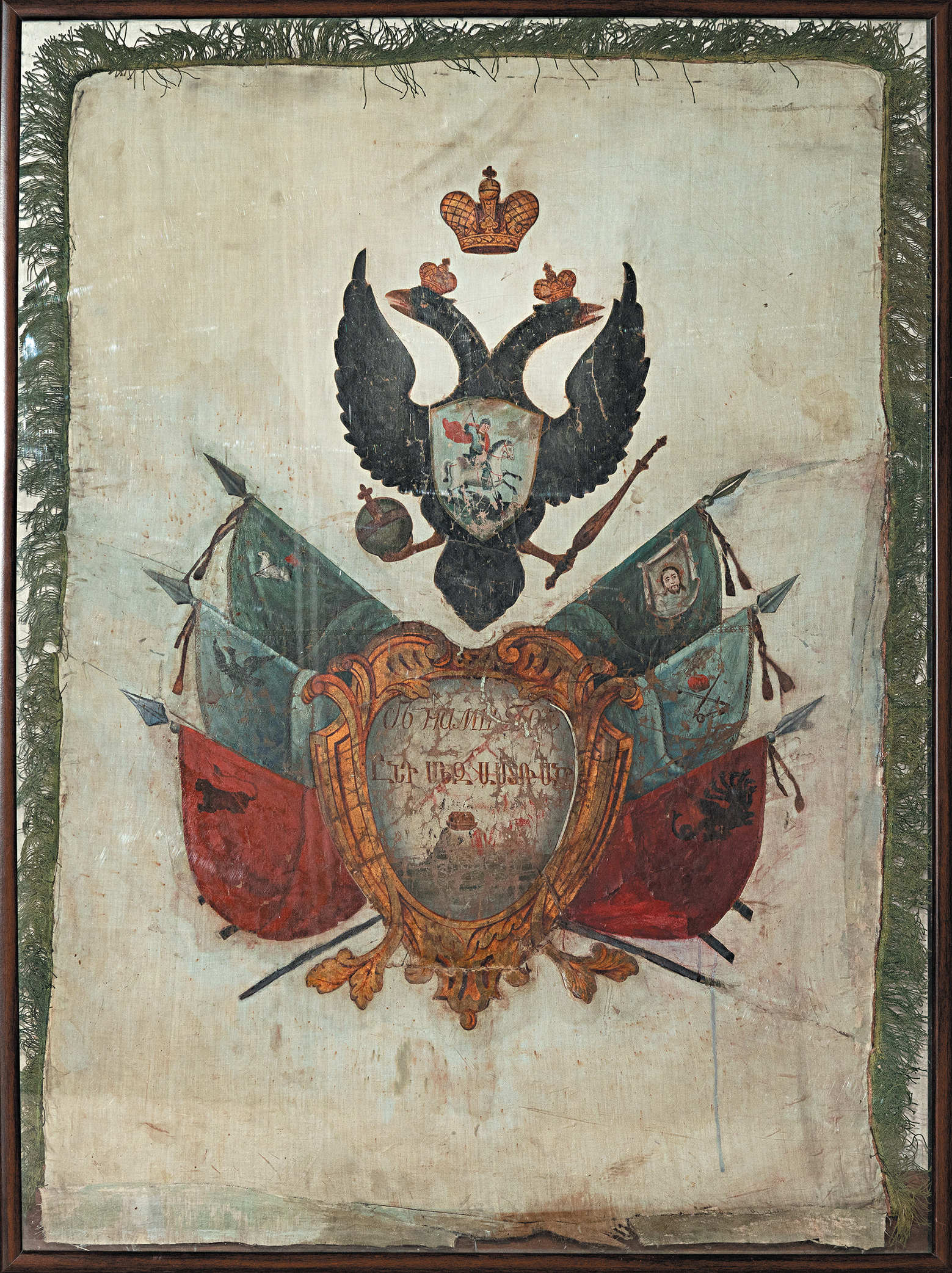
One of the battle flags of the Armenian volunteer militia during the Russo-Persian War of 1826–1828

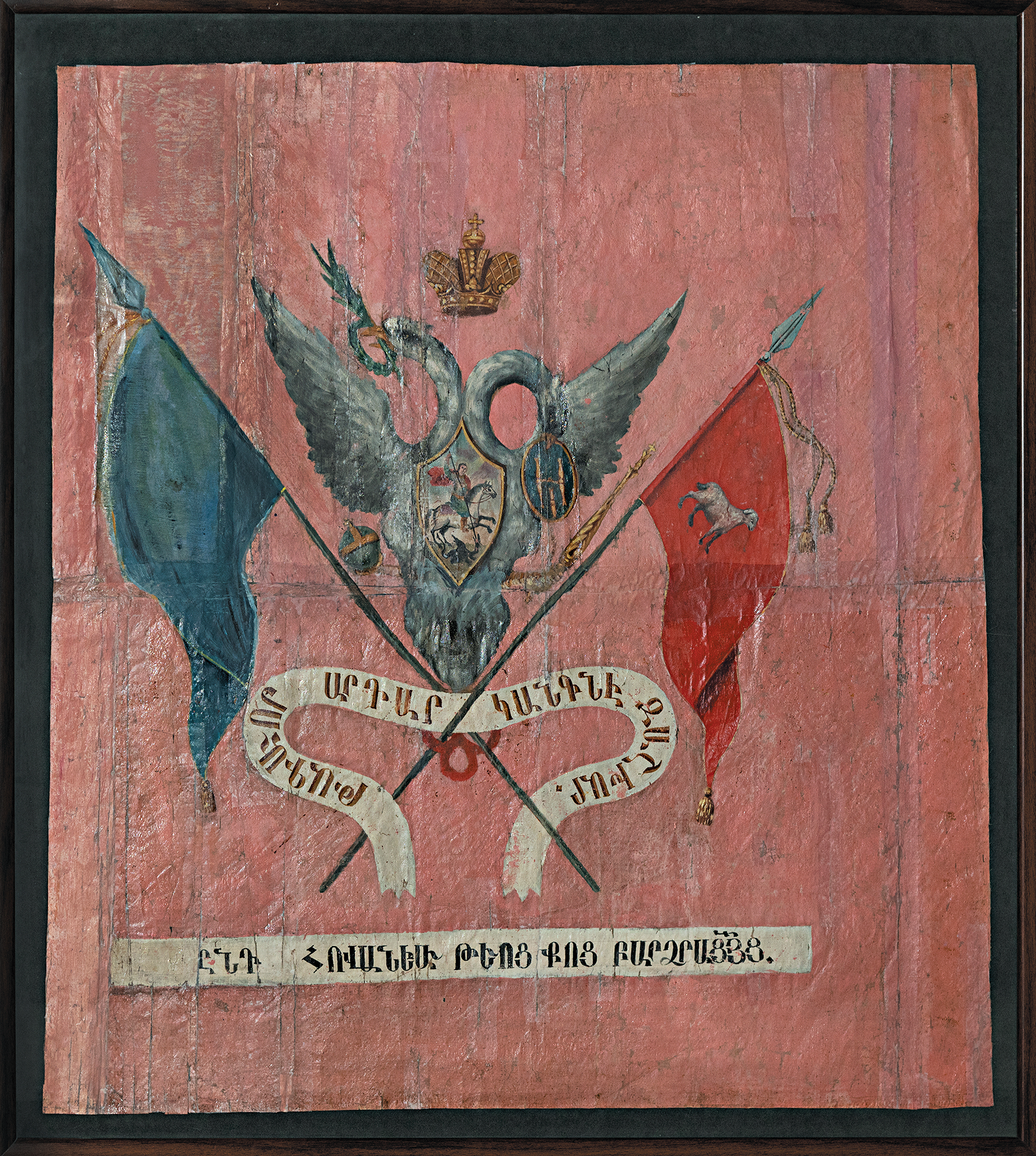
One of the battle flags of the Armenian volunteer militia during the Russo-Persian War of 1826–1828

=== First Republic of Armenia ===
On 1 August 1918, after the declaration of the First Republic of Armenia, the Armenian National Council convened the first session of the National Assembly of Armenia. Several reports indicate that an unknown tricolor flag was flown at the assembly, which was possibly the tricolor that would be approved during the assembly. According to Simon Vratsian, Stepan Malkhasyants presented a now-lost report on the first day of the assembly, in which he discussed the flag of the republic and proposed a horizontal tricolor of red, blue, and orange. While no meaning was given to these colors by Malkhasyants, several parliament members believed that the red represented the blood of the Armenian people, the blue represented the sky of Armenia and the orange represented the talent and work of the Armenian people. The proposed flag sparked significant debate in the parliament, in which several proposed flags historically used in Armenia were brought up. Many members argued that the orange should be replaced with green, as orange cloth was difficult to source in Armenia at the time. However, Prime Minister Hovhannes Kajaznuni believed the orange to be more aesthetically pleasing, and so kept the color. Later that day, a vote was held, in which it was decided that the flag was to be a horizontal tricolor of red, blue, and orange, with a height to width ratio of 2:3.

The design was seemingly temporary, and was to be approved by the constituent assembly, which was to be formed when the Republic of Armenia united with Turkish Armenia. Sourcing orange cloth for the flag continued to be difficult; on 19 September 1918, minister of internal affairs Aram Manukian sent an instruction to government institutions that the colors to be used for the flag were red, blue, and yellow. In June 1919, the parliament of Armenia reaffirmed that the previously adopted flag was the flag of a United Armenia, but would only be finalized at the constituent assembly. Despite not being official, the Republic of Armenia used it in official documents, such as an April 1920 bank check issued in the United States. The constituent assembly would never take place, as on 29 November 1920, Russian Soviet Federative Socialist Republic troops and Armenian Bolsheviks occupied Armenia's capital Yerevan, and proclaimed the Socialist Soviet Republic of Armenia.

Several alternate proposals for the flag were made by Armenians. On 31 July 1919, Armenian artist Martiros Saryan sent a letter to Kajaznuni after learning that the flag had not been finalized, in which he proposed three alternate designs, one tricolor and two rainbows. As he believed that the temporary flag represented a rainbow, and thought it was too similar to the flag of the Don All-Russian Army, he proposed that the flag be a six-colored horizontal rainbow. In the watercolor images contained in the letter, one of these rainbow flags was depicted with equally-spaced bars, and the other depicted with the primary colored bars twice as large as the secondary color bars. The final attached imaged is a tricolor of red, yellow, and blue from top to bottom, possibly arranged to match their order in a rainbow.

In April 1919, a proposal for the flag of Armenia was published in the Armenian diaspora journal Veradzenount, consisting of a horizontal bicolor with the top two-thirds blue, and the bottom third red, with a white cross in the center.

Flag of the First Republic of Armenia
(1918–1922)

First rainbow flag proposed by Saryan

Second rainbow flag proposed by Saryan

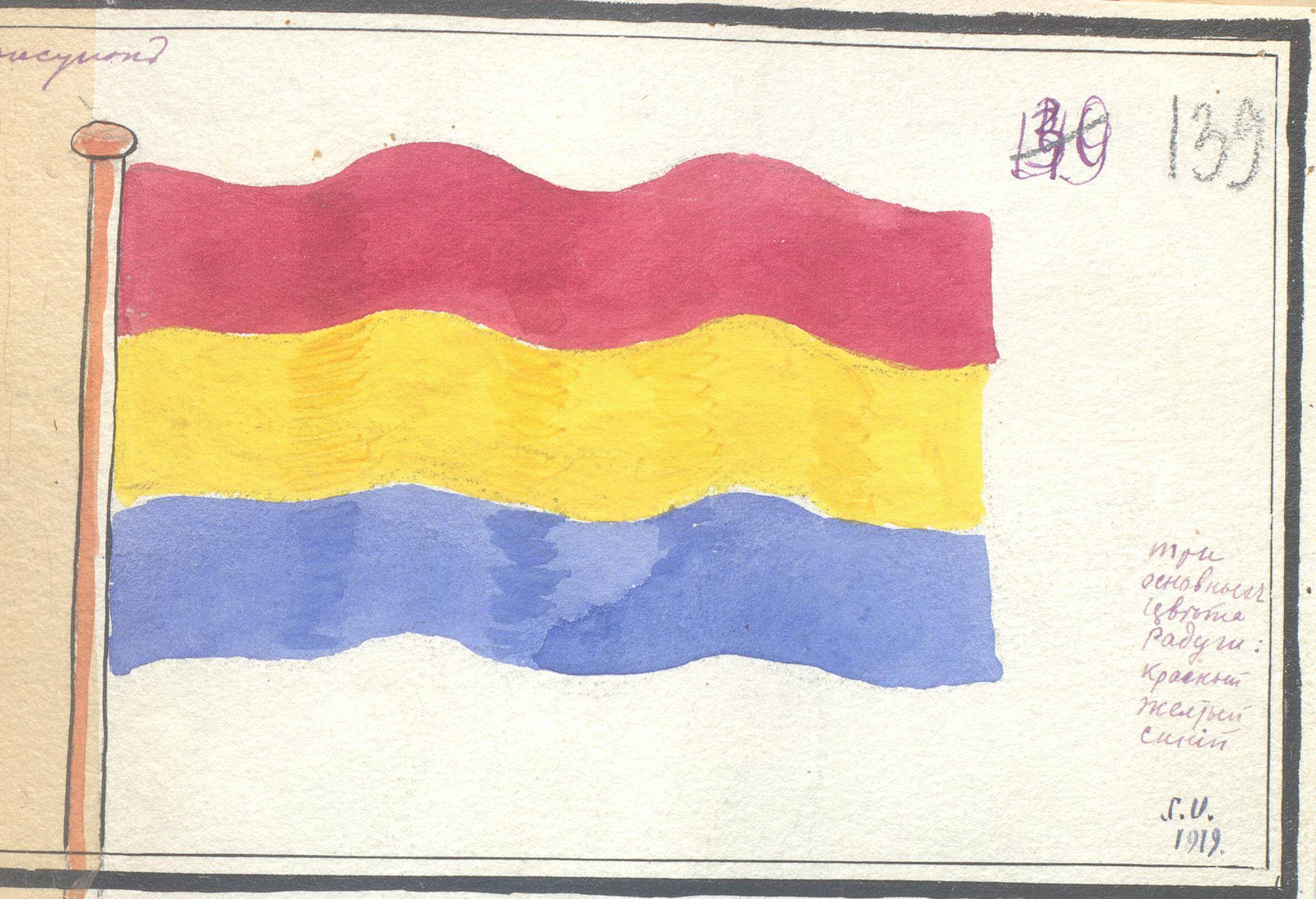
Tricolor flag proposed by Saryan

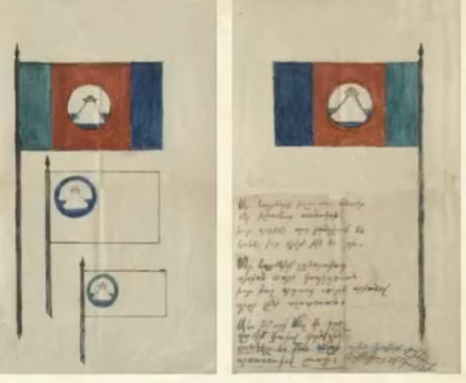
Proposed flag using the color scheme of Alishan's second flag, with an image of Noah's Ark atop Mount Ararat

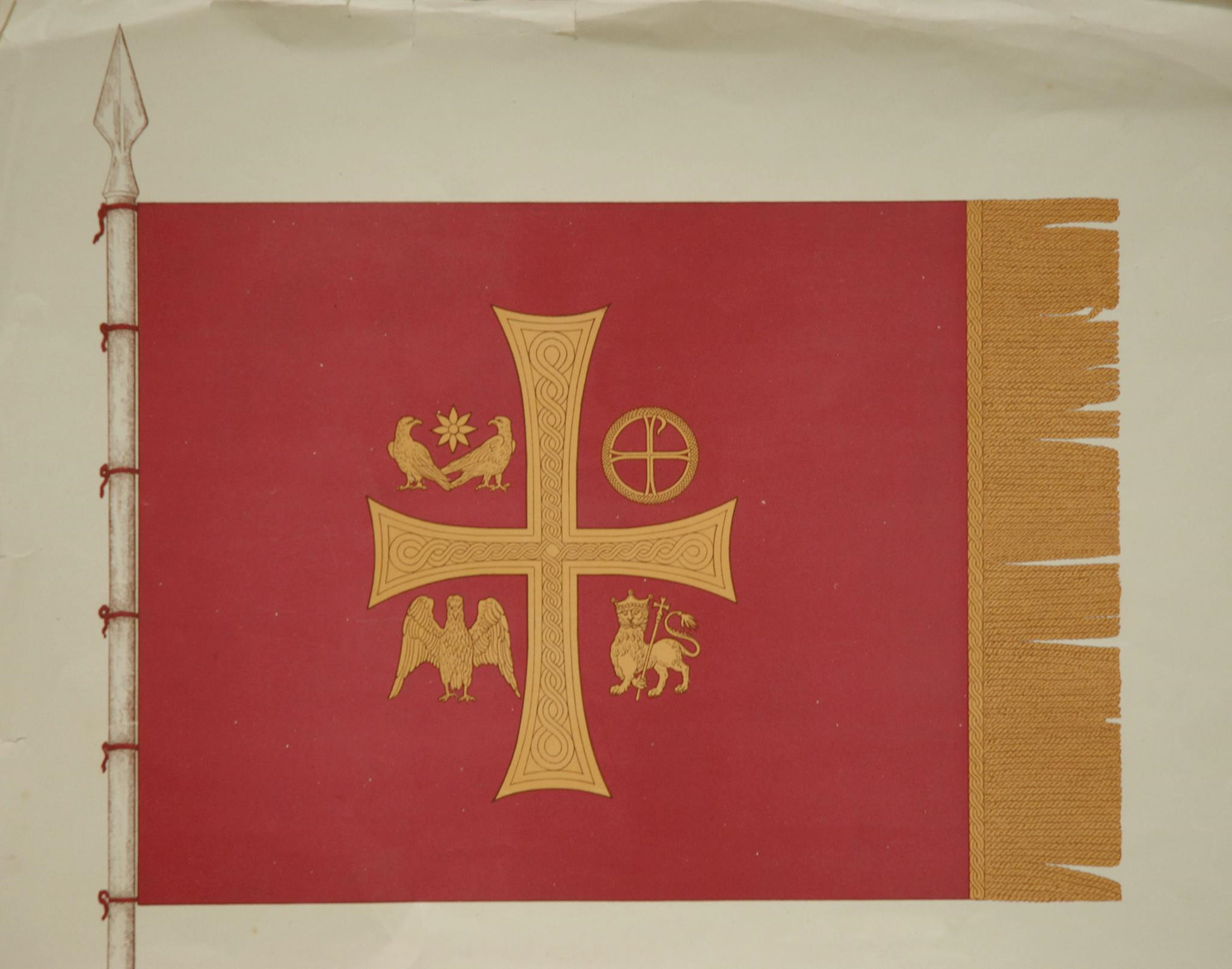
Flag proposed by the Mekhitarists

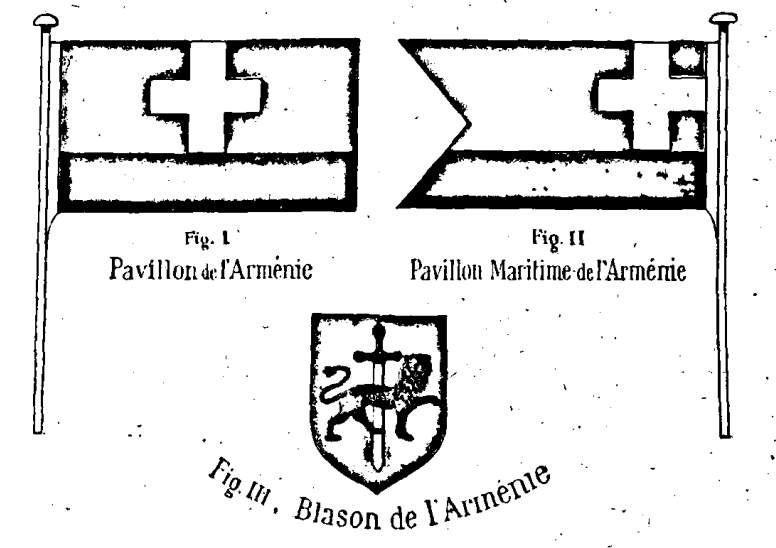
Left: Proposed national flag by the Veradzenount magazine. Right: Proposed naval ensign. Center: Proposed Coat of Arms.

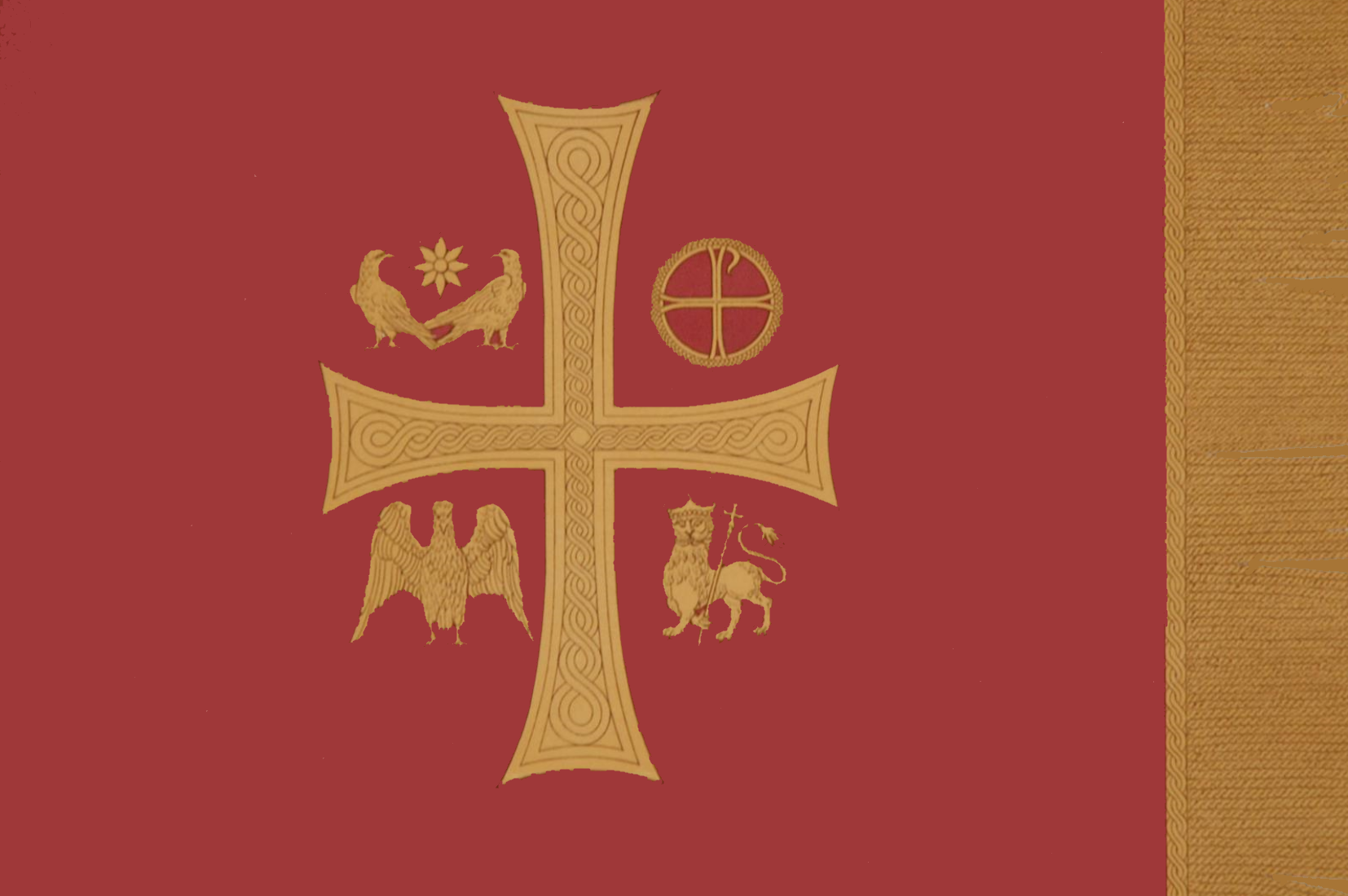
Mekhitarist proposed flag of Armenia from 1919, digitalized.

=== Armenian Soviet Socialist Republic ===
On 2 February 1922, the Constitution of the Armenian SSR was signed into law, describing the republic's flag in Article 89 as a red banner, with the gold letters "Հ.Խ.Ս.Հ." (Note: The abbreviation for the Socialist Soviet Republic of Armenia, (Armenian: Հայաստանի Սոցիալիստական Խորհրդային Հանրապետություն)) in the upper left corner. Official contemporaneous media which depict the flag, such as pins and certificates, often portray it with variations, including periods between the letters, and with a gold frame around the letters. Additionally, a 1923 book published by the Soviet Ministry of Foreign Affairs depicts the lettering of the flag in Cyrillic script, instead of in the Armenian alphabet used in the constitution's description.

The flag would continue to be used by the Armenian SSR even after its integration into the Transcaucasian Socialist Federative Soviet Republic in 1922. The new constitution of the Armenian SSR under the Transcaucasian SFSR, approved on 4 March 1927, described the flag almost exactly the same as the 1922 constitution.

In 1936, the Constitution of the USSR was rewritten, splitting the Transcaucasian SFSR into its constituent republics. Soon after in 1937, the constitution of the Armenian SSR was once again rewritten, adding a gold yellow hammer and sickle above the lettering. In 1940, a decree by the Presidium of the Supreme Soviet of the Armenian SSR ordered that the lettering on the flag be changed to "Հ.Ս.Ս.Ռ.", (Note: The abbreviation for the Armenian Soviet Socialist Republic, (Armenian: Հայկական Սովետական Սոցիալիստական Ռեսպուբլիկա)) in order to reflect the new name of the Armenian SSR. In 1952, the flag was completely redesigned. The obverse of the new flag was composed of a red field, with a horizontal blue stripe running through the center, and a golden hammer and sickle below a star in the canton. The reverse of the flag simply contained the red field and blue stripe.

In late May 1988, amid rising nationalist tensions due to glasnost and perestroika, the leader of the Communist Party of Armenia, Suren Harutyunyan, allowed the previously banned flag of the First Republic of Armenia to fly in Yerevan for the first time in over sixty years. A year later, he urged that the flag be officially recognized, after a mass demonstration by the Karabakh movement where the tricolour was flown. This came on 24 August 1990, a day after the Armenian Supreme Soviet declared the republic's sovereignty and renamed the country the Republic of Armenia. At that point, just over a year before Armenia declared its formal independence from the USSR, the tricolour replaced the 1952 flag.

Depiction of the flag of the Armenian SSR in Cyrillic
(1923)

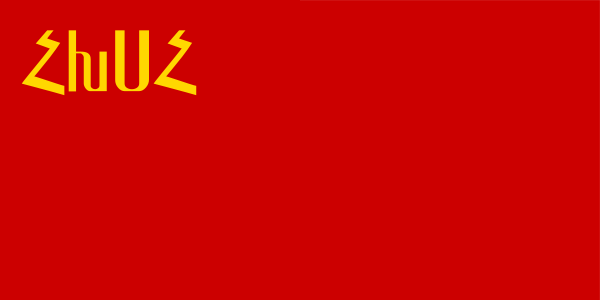
Flag of the Armenian SSR
(1922-1937)

Flag of the Armenian SSR
(1937−1940)

Flag of the Armenian SSR
(1940−1952)

Flag of the Armenian SSR, obverse
(1952–1990)

Flag of the Armenian SSR, reverse
(1952–1990)

Flag of the Armenian SSR
(1990−1991)

== Usage ==
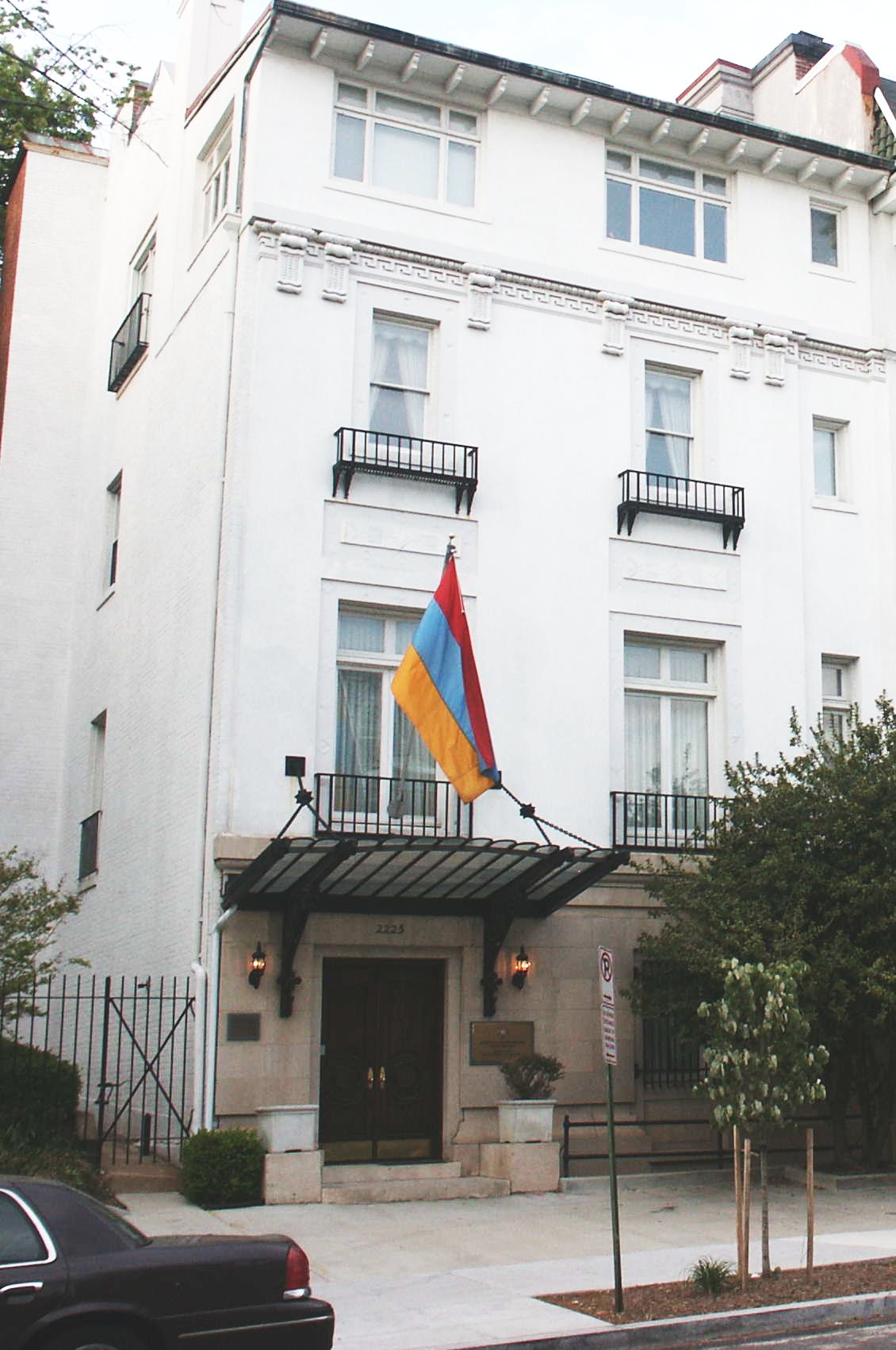
The flag waving at the Armenian Embassy in Washington, D.C.

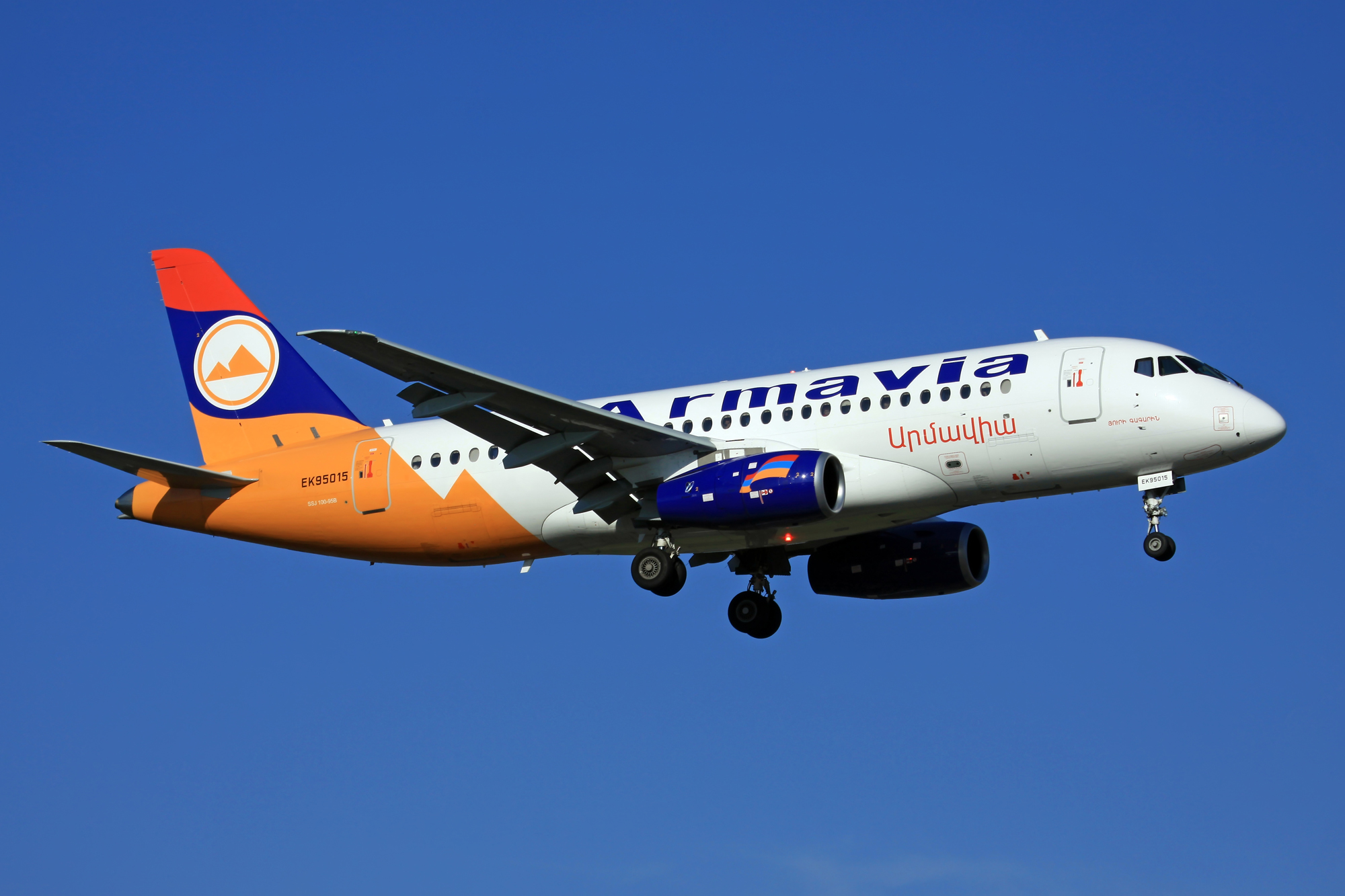
The Armenian flag formed the basis of the livery of Armavia, seen here on one of the airline's Sukhoi Superjets.

The 2006 law on the National Flag of Armenia states that the flag has to be raised on the following public buildings:

- Residence of the President
- Parliament
- Government
- Constitutional Court
- Office of Public Prosecutor
- Central Bank of Armenia
- Other governmental buildings

The law requires the lowering of the flag to the midpoint of the flagpole on the days of mourning or during mourning ceremonies. A black ribbon needs to be placed at the top of the flag; the length of the ribbon should be equal to the length of the flag. The flying flag has to be raised in its entirety, clean, and unfaded; moreover, the lower part of the flag should be at least 2.5 m off the ground.

=== National flag days ===
The day of the National Flag of Armenia is marked on 15 June every year. The day is chosen for the reason that the Armenian law on the National Flag of Armenia was passed on 15 June 2006. The day of the Armenian tricolour was celebrated for the first time on 15 June 2010 in Yerevan.

The daily display of the Armenian flag is encouraged, but legally required only on the following days:

- 1 January, 2 January – New Year
- 6 January – Christmas
- 8 March – International Women's Day
- 7 April – Motherhood and Beauty Day
- 1 May – International Worker's Solidarity Day
- 9 May – Victory and Peace Day
- 28 May – First Armenian Republic Day, 1918
- 5 July – Constitution Day, 1995
- 21 September – Independence Day, 1991
- 7 December – Spitak Earthquake Memorial Day, 1988

== Influence ==
The national flag is also mentioned in the song "Mer Hayrenik" (Our Fatherland), the national anthem of Armenia. Specifically, the second and third stanzas sing about the creation of the national flag:

Here is a flag for you my brother,
That I have sewed
Over the sleepless nights,
And bathed in my tears.

Look at it, tricoloured,
A valuable symbol for us.
Let it shine against the enemy.
Let Armenia be glorious forever.

=== Flag of Artsakh ===
Flag of the Republic of Artsakh was the Armenian flag defaced with the white sideways zig-zag chevron in the fly.

On 2 June 1992, the Republic of Artsakh, a now-defunct de facto independent republic in South Caucasus, adopted a flag derived from the flag of Armenia, with only a white pattern added. A white, five-toothed, stepped carpet pattern was added to the flag, beginning at the two verges of the cloth's right side and connecting at a point equal to one-third of the distance from that side. The white pattern symbolized the separation of Artsakh from Armenia proper and its aspiration for eventual union with the Republic's claimed Fatherland. This symbolized the Armenian heritage, culture and population of the area and represents Artsakh as being a separated region of Armenia by the triangular shape and the zigzag cutting through the flag. The pattern was also similar to the designs used on rugs. The ratio of the flag's breadth to its length is 1:2, same as the Armenian tricolour.

=== Flag of the Pan-Armenian Games ===
In addition to the flag of Artsakh, the Armenian flag colors influenced the design of the Pan-Armenian Games flag. In the center of the light blue flag are six interlocking rings, derived from the Olympic rings. The sixth, orange-colored ring, interlocks with the blue and red rings, which symbolize Armenia. Above the rings is a flame in the colors of the Armenian flag.

== See also ==
- Armorial of Armenia
- Coat of arms of Armenia
- Flag of the Armenian Soviet Socialist Republic
- International places lit in the Armenian flag on Independence Day
- List of Armenian flags
