= Coat of arms of Armenia =

Versions
- Escutcheon-only version
- Armiger: Republic of Armenia
- Adopted: 19 April 1992
- Shield: Quarterly: 1; Gules, a lion passant facing to the sinister with a cross rising from its back Or, 2; Azure, a double headed eagle Or, 3; Azure, a roundel Or charged with an octofoil between two eagles trussed regardant and addorsed Or, 4; Gules, a Lion passant guardant holding a cross Or. On an Inescutcheon en surtout, a Landscape of Mount Ararat with the flood waters receding and Noah's ark at the summit, all Argent
- Supporters: To the dexter, an eagle regardant Or, and to the sinister a lion regardant also Or
- Compartment: Bundle of Wheat Flowers, Feather, Broken Chain, Ribon, and Sword

The national coat of arms of Armenia (Armenian: Հայաստանի զինանշան, romanized: Hayastani zinanshan) was adopted on 19 April 1992 by resolution of the Armenian Supreme Council. On 15 June 2006 the Armenian Parliament passed the law on the state coat of arms of Armenia.

It consists of an eagle and a lion supporting a shield. The coat of arms combines new and old symbols. The eagle and lion are ancient Armenian symbols dating from the first Armenian kingdoms that existed prior to Christ. These symbols are found on the Armenian Highland from times immemorial. Numerous Armenian dynasties such as Artaxiad, Arsacid, Bagratuni and Rubenid, used these symbols as their royal insignia. Like other post-Soviet republics whose symbols do not predate the October Revolution, the current emblem retained one component of the Soviet one such as the Mount Ararat on the shield. Prior to 1992, Armenia had an emblem similar to all other Soviet Republics.

== History ==
=== Coat of arms of the First Republic of Armenia ===
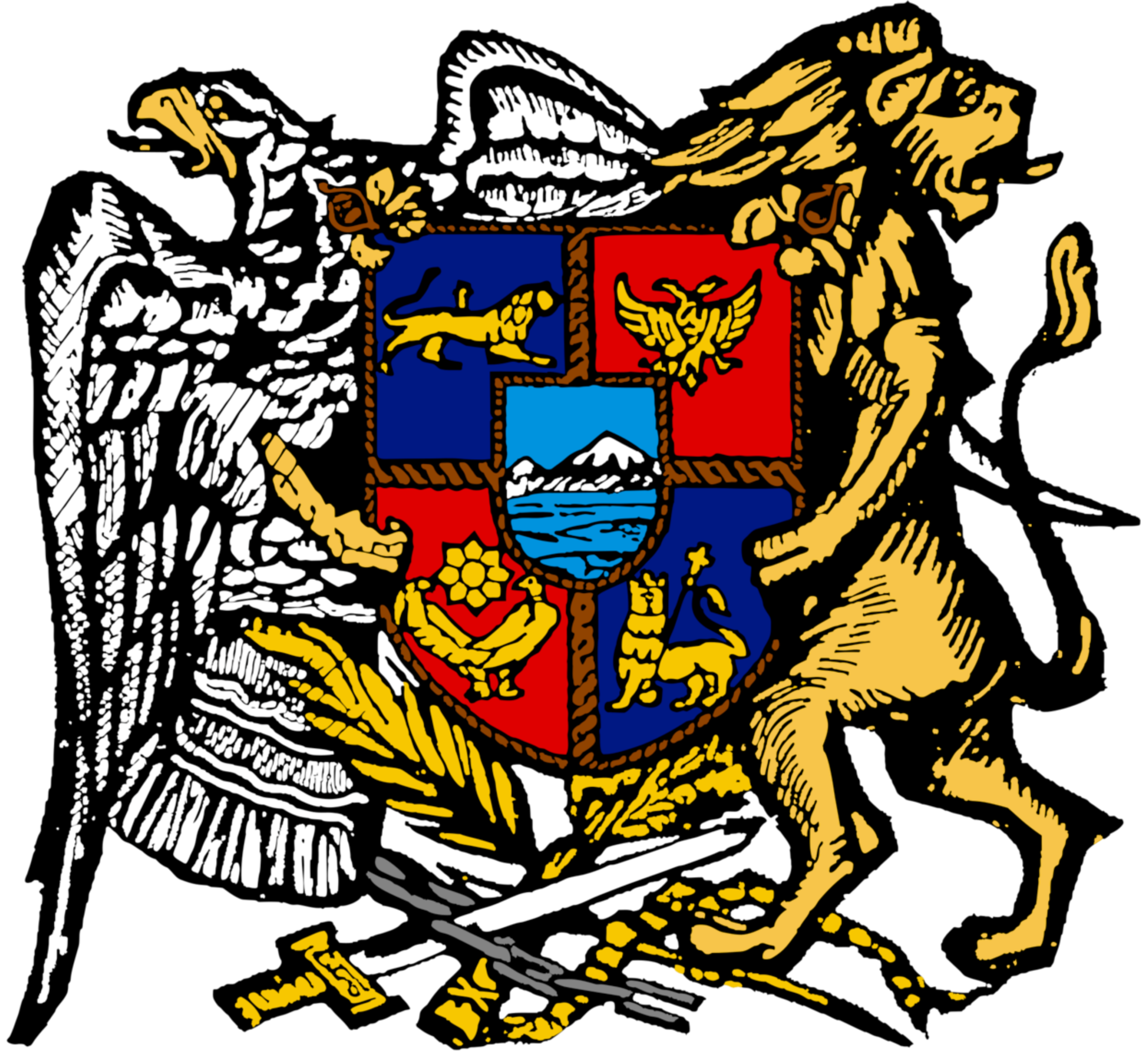
Coat of arms of the first Republic

The present-day Armenian coat of arms has its origins with the establishment of the First Republic of Armenia in 1918. In that year, an early variation of the coat of arms was adopted. The symbols on this earlier version were placed in a slightly different order and the eagle and lion have their tongues out, giving them a more menacing look. Only Mount Ararat (along with Little Ararat) are depicted while Noah's Ark is absent. The coat of arms was designed by architect and member of the Russian Academy of Fine Arts Alexander Tamanian and artist Hakob Kojoyan.

=== Transcaucasian SFSR ===
The coat of arms of Transcaucasian SFSR 1922–1936.

In 1922, Armenia was incorporated into Transcaucasian SFSR with Georgia and Azerbaijan. The coat of arms of the Transcaucasian SFSR was adopted by the government of the Transcaucasian SFSR. It is uncertain when exactly it was adopted. It incorporates designs from each of the three major groups that combined in the Transcaucasian SFSR, the Armenians, Azeri and Georgians, and unusually features Islamic art and communist elements side by side. The latticework in the star itself bespeaks the former coat of arms of Georgia from 1918 to 1921 and adopted again from 1991 to 2004; the crescent moon represents the Muslim Azeris, on a background depicting the national symbol of the Armenians, Mount Ararat.

=== Soviet coat of arms ===
The coat of arms of Soviet Armenia, 1922–1937.

The coat of arms of Soviet Armenia and the independent Republic of Armenia 1936–1992.

In 1937, a new coat of arms was adopted. Like the coat of arms of the first independent republic, this one prominently featured Mount Ararat along with the Soviet hammer and sickle and red star behind it. The inclusion of Mount Ararat brought objections from Turkey because the mountain is part of its territory. The Kremlin retorted that, although the Turkish symbol was the crescent, surely it did not mean that they laid claim to the moon. The Soviet Union broke apart in 1991 and Armenia thus became an independent republic. In 1992, a slightly modified version of the coat of arms of the first republic was adopted and has remained in place ever since.

== Symbolism ==
=== Shield ===
The shield itself consists of five components. In the center is a depiction of the Mount Ararat with Noah's Ark sitting atop it. According to tradition, the ark is said to have finally rested on the mountain after the great flood. Ararat is considered the national symbol of Armenia and thus is of principal importance to the coat of arms. Surrounding Mount Ararat are symbols of old Armenian dynasties. In the lower left portion of the shield, there are two eagles looking at each other, symbolizing the length of the Armenian territory during the reign of the Artaxiad dynasty that ruled from the second century B.C. to the beginning of the Christian era. In the upper left portion, there is a lion with a cross, the emblem for the Bagratuni dynasty that ruled during the Middle Ages, between the 9th and 11th centuries. Under this dynasty, Armenia blossomed culturally, making its capital, Ani, one of the most important cultural, social and commercial centers of its time. The Bagratuni kingdom was destroyed by the Byzantine Empire's encroachment and by Seljuk conquests in the 11th century. In the upper right portion, there is a two-headed eagle, the emblem of the first dynasty to reign over Christian Armenia, the Arsacid dynasty, which ruled from the first century to 428. Tiridates III made Armenia the first country to adopt Christianity as official religion in 301. In the lower right portion, there is a lion with a cross, the emblem of the Rubenid dynasty. This dynasty reigned in the Armenian Kingdom of Cilicia, a state that expanded and prospered during the 12th and 13th centuries, until the Mamelukes eventually conquered it in 1375.

=== Eagle and lion ===
The eagle supports the shield on the left side of the coat of arms, while the lion on the right side. The eagle was the symbol of the Artaxiad dynasty and later on the symbol of the Arsacid dynasty of Armenia. It holds the Artaxiad dynasty's branch of the shield. Whereas, the lion was the symbol of the Bagratuni dynasty and later on the symbol of the Rubenid dynasty. It holds the Rubenid dynasty's branch of the shield. The eagle and the lion are a common theme for civilizations on the Armenian Highland. As such they have been represented throughout various Armenian dynasties.

Both of these animals were chosen because of their power, courage, patience, wisdom, and nobility in animal kingdom.

=== About the symbol ascribed to the Arsacids in the coat of arms of the Republic of Armenia (double-headed eagle) ===
Since 1920, the symbol of the two-headed eagle on the shield of the RA coat of arms has been attributed to the Arsacid dynasty. Despite the lack of direct evidence, a comparative analysis of the available pictographic, chronicle, and bas-relief materials leads us to conclude that the double-headed eagle could refer to Arsacid Armenia, with the only difference being that the symbol in the coat of arms of Armenia does not represent the Arsacid dynasty itself, but their era and fame, being a synthesis of the two-headed eagle of the Mamikonians and the same eagle of the Armenian Church established by the Arsacids.

=== Five vital elements ===
1. The sword represents the power and strength of the nation, breaking the chains of oppression.
2. The broken chain represents effort shown by the nation to gain freedom and independence.
3. The wheat ears represent the hard working nature of the Armenian people.
4. The feather represents the intellectual and cultural heritage of the Armenian people (as a quill pen).
5. The ribbon represents the colors of the flag of Armenia blue, the sky, orange, courage (Noah's Ark), red, 1.5 million deaths on the genocide.

== Use ==
The coat of arms of Armenia is the central motif of the presidential seal, it is also used on monetary units and on orders and medals of Armenia.

Order "National Hero of Armenia"

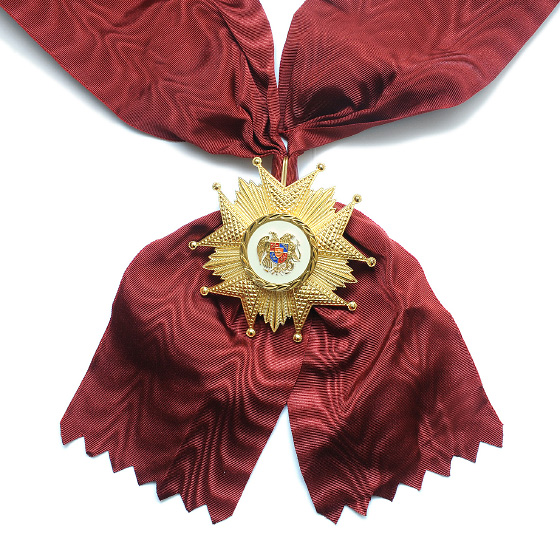
Order "Order of Glory"

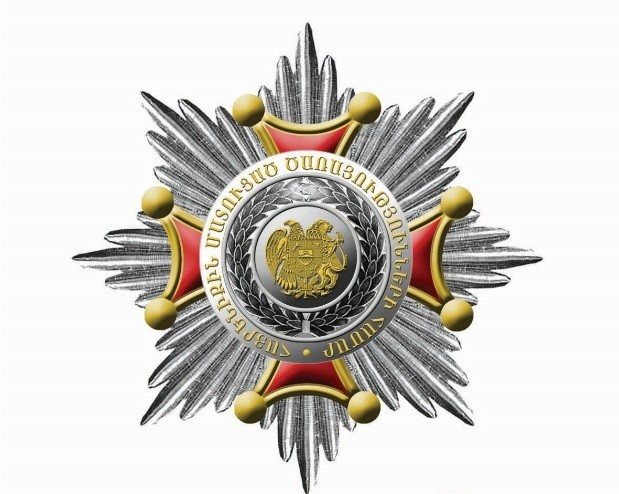
Order "Services to the Motherland"

== See also ==
- Armorial of Armenia
- Coat of arms of the Republic of Artsakh
- Emblem of the Armenian Soviet Socialist Republic
- Flag of Armenia
- National symbols of Armenia
