= Lamos (Cilicia) =

Town of ancient Cilicia and later of Isauria

Coordinates: 36°14′27″N 32°27′01″E

Lamos was a town of ancient Cilicia and later of Isauria, inhabited in Roman and Byzantine times. It was a bishopric; for its ecclesiastical history see Lamus (see).

Its site is located near the settlement of Adanda in Gürçam, Gazipaşa, Antalya Province, Turkey.
