= Vishap =

Armenian mythological creature

The Vishap (Armenian: վիշապ) is a dragon in Armenian mythology closely associated with water, similar to the Leviathan. It is usually depicted as a winged snake or with a combination of elements from different animals.The name might derive from an ancient Iranian term vi-šāpa, 'having poisonous juices', used in reference to snakes

Mount Ararat was the main home of the Vishap. The volcanic character of the Araratian peak and its earthquakes may have suggested its association with the Vishap. Sometimes with its children, the Vishap used to steal children or toddlers and put a small evil spirit of their own brood in their stead. According to ancient beliefs, the Vishap ascended to the sky or descended therefrom to earth, causing thunderous storms, whirlwinds, and absorption of the sun (causing an eclipse). The dragon was worshipped in a number of Eastern countries, symbolising the element of water, fertility and wealth, and later became a frightful symbol of power. According to ancient legends, the dragon fought Vahagn the Dragon Slayer.

There is a statue to Vahagn, who slew the Vishap, in Yerevan by Karlen Nurijanyan and Nerses Charkhchyan.

== Gallery ==
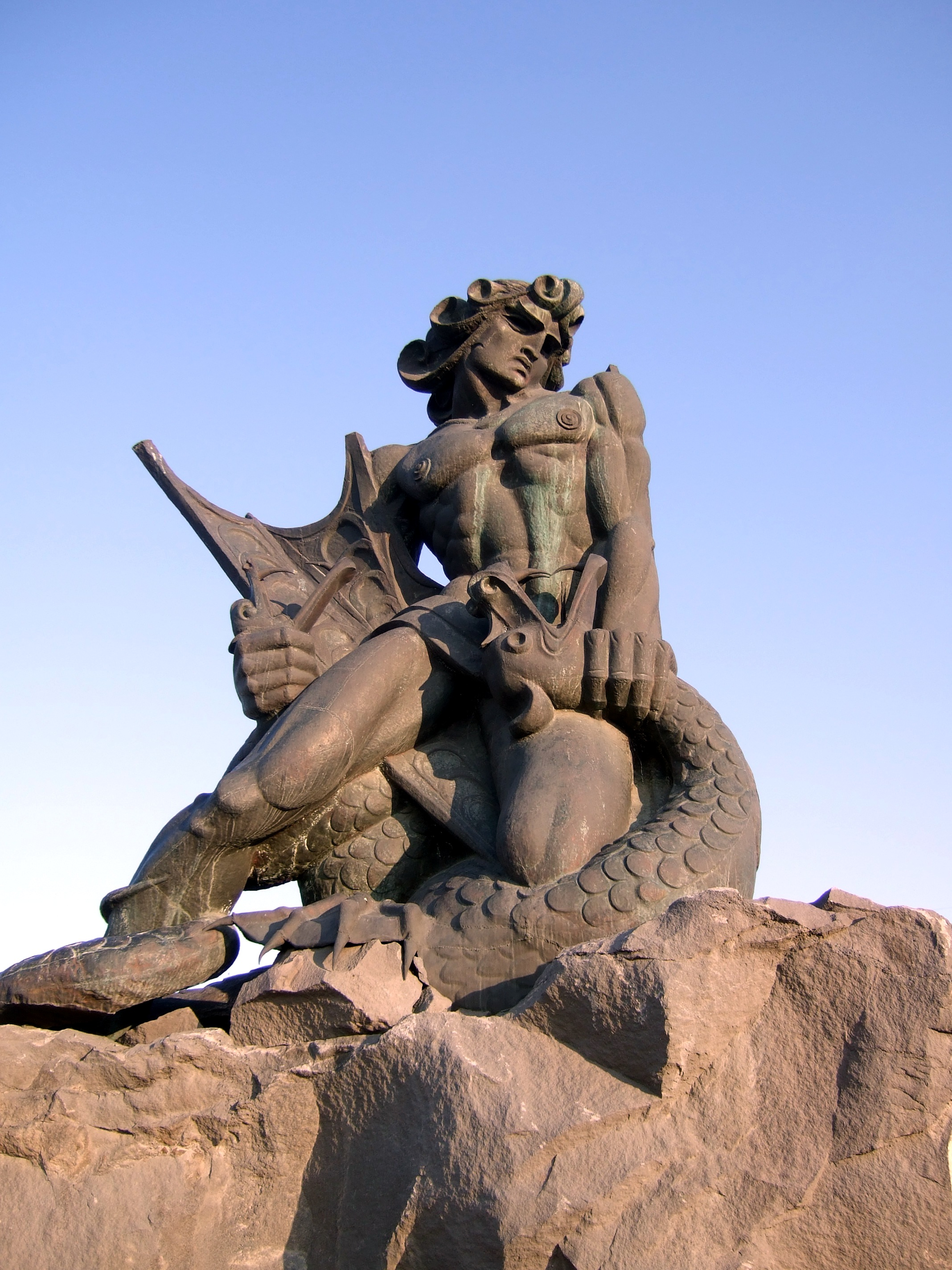
Armenian mythological hero Vahagn slaying Vishap

Reconstructed banner of Hayk Nahapet

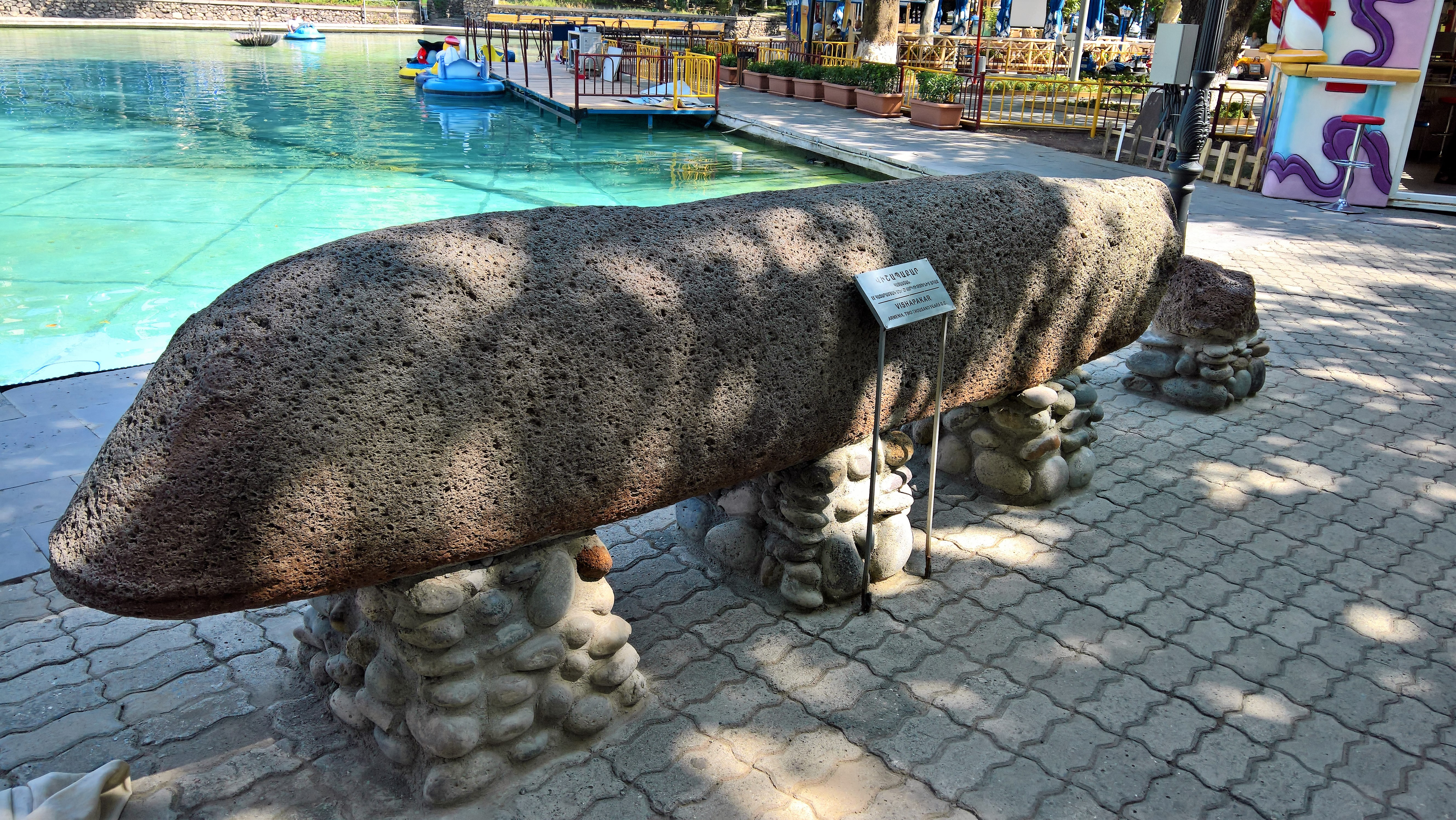
Example of Vishapakar, an Armenian "dragon stone"

== See also ==
- Armenian mythology
- Symbols of Armenia
- List of dragons in mythology and folklore
- Vishapakar
