= Vishapakar =

Monoliths found in the Armenian Highlands

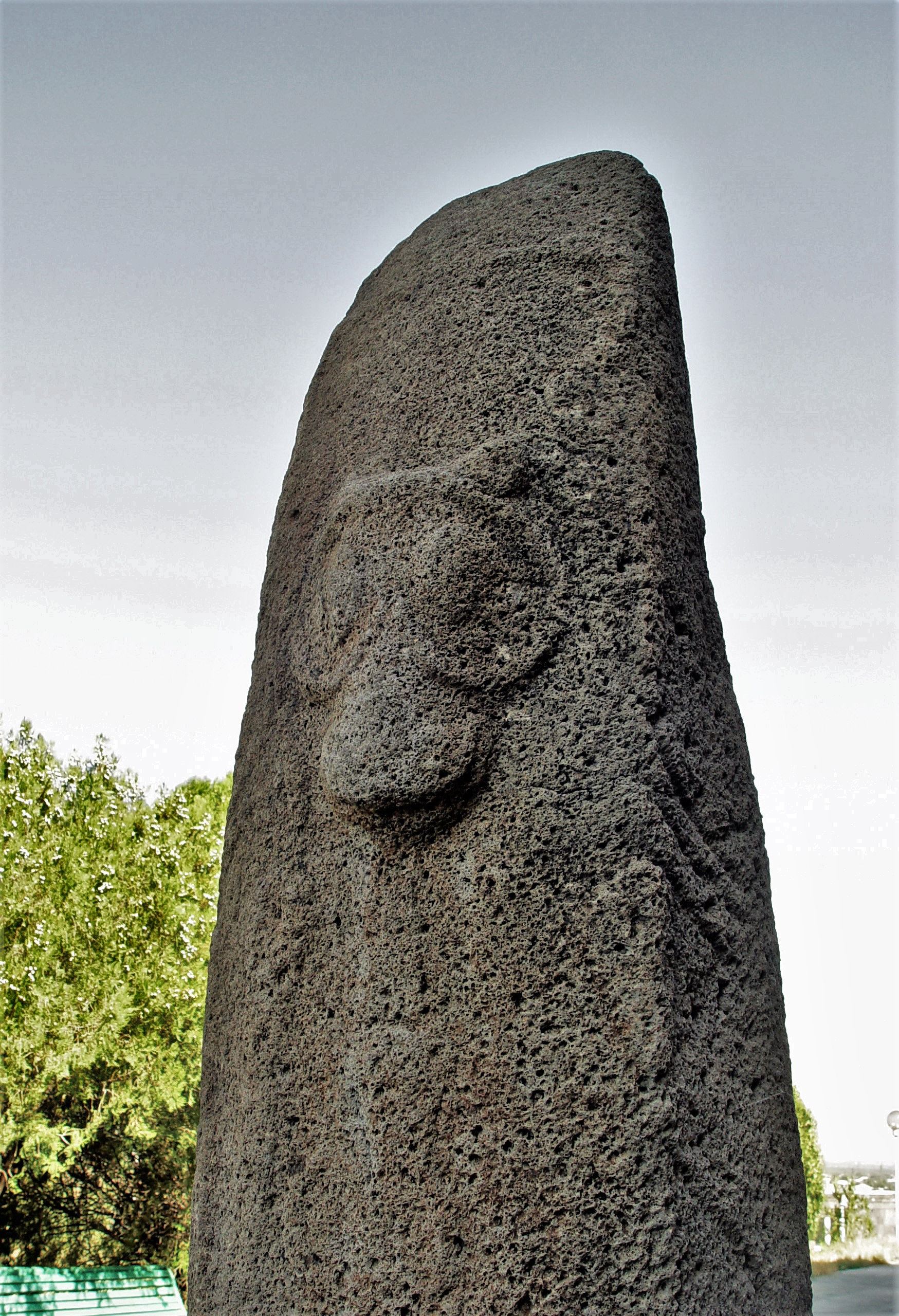
A vishap

A vishapakar (Armenian: Վիշապաքար) also known as vishap stones, vishap stelae, "serpent-stones", "dragon stones", are characteristic monoliths found in large numbers in the Armenian Highlands, in natural and artificial ponds, and other sources of water. They are commonly carved from one piece of stone, into cigar-like shapes with fish heads or serpents. Supposedly they are images of vishaps, a water dragon of Armenian folklore. There are about 150 known extant vishap stelae, of which 90 are found in Armenia.

== Location ==
Found in Armenia's Gegham mountains, Lake Sevan's north-east coast, Mount Aragats's slopes, Garni, the valley of Çoruh River, as well as other places, where they used to worship vishapakar in ancient times. They often have diagnostic names. They were carved from massive stones (the biggest being 5.06 m high), in a fish form, with a snake, bull, ram, stork, etc., as well as bird sculptures, usually placed in fountains, canals, reservoirs, and artificial lakes nearby. It can be assumed that these slabs were supporting agriculture and irrigation, by worshipping personal water deities.

== Discovery and research ==
The scholarly interest to vishaps emerged in the early twentieth century. In 1909 Nicholas Marr and Yakov Smirnov visited Armenia's Temple of Garni for a paleontological excavation and described the items found in the Gegham mountains. Ashkharbek Kalantar was the first to approach the vishaps within an archaeological context, linking them to other megalithic phenomena and proposeding the influential hypothesis that vishaps denote the critical points in prehistoric irrigation systems.

The scientists in the mountains discovered megalithic stone sculptures, which the Armenians called "Vishap" and were mostly in the form of a fish. The biggest vishap measured 4.75 m high, and 55 cm wide. In 1909, all the vishaps were damaged, and a part of them were buried in the soil.

Soon, other expeditions that were organized on the Gegham mountains found more vishaps. In 1910, Nicholas Marr and Yakov Smirnov had already found 27 similar megalithic sculptures. There were similar vishaps discovered in Armenia's Lake Sevan, southern Georgia, and modern day eastern Turkey (historical Western Armenia).

=== Recent archaeological research: Gurzadyan and Bobokhyan, 2025 ===
In September 2025, astrophysicist Vahe Gurzadyan and archaeologist Arsen Bobokhyan of Yerevan State University published a comprehensive study of vishapakars in the Nature Portfolio journal npj Heritage Science. The study included the first statistical analysis of the sizes and altitudes of 115 known examples across Armenia and neighboring regions.

The authors adopted labor as an informative descriptor of vishapakars: their size provides an indication of the amount of labor required for their creation, while their altitude reflects the limited time—and consequently limited labor—available for their construction. Their unexpected finding of a bimodal altitude distribution challenged the expectation that larger monuments would be concentrated at lower altitudes. Instead, it suggested that significant cult motivations influenced their construction and labor-intensive placement. The positioning of vishapakars near springs, streams, and ancient irrigation systems therefore appears to support the existence of a water cult, as proposed by Ashkharbek Kalantar in the 1920s and 1930s.

The authors further outline that human history reveals that usually the cults are indeed associated to significant efforts (labor) of their societies. This finding contributes to a broader understanding of vishapakars within the global context of megalithic monuments, including comparable sites in Europe and the Andes.

== Dating ==
Determining how old vishaps are is particularly difficult. The monuments are placed away from neighborhoods, whose radiocarbon analysis of the organic residues would enable them to determine the approximate age.

On the premiere vishap that was found, there were images of the cross and Armenian letters dated from the 13th century. The position of the cross and the writings show that in the 13th century, the vishap was still in the upright position. In 1963, a vishap which had an inscription of Argishti I of Urartu (8th century BC) was excavated in the Garni area.

Comparison has been made with the megaliths found in the North Caucasus and Europe. There are also similarities with monuments found in northern Mongolia.

== Typology ==
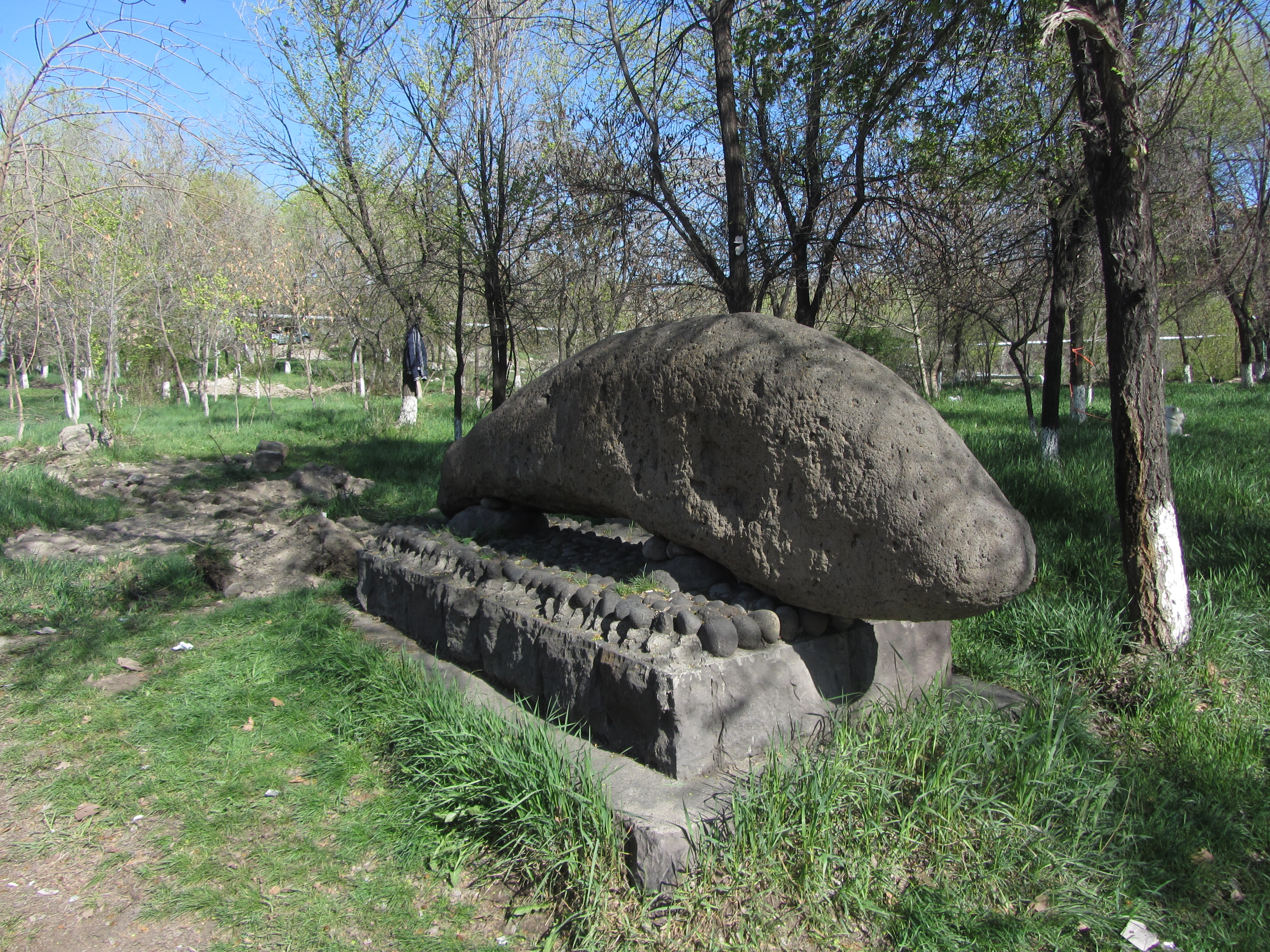
Vishap in Yerevan's Nor Nork area

All the findings are carved on one stone, that is within 3–5 m high. Most of the vishaps are in a fish form that resembles a catfish. Basically, the carved details represent the fish eyes, mouth, tail, and gills. Another portion of the vishaps are pictured as a hoofed animal such as a bull or ram and may represent a sacrifice, with various cases only pictured as stakes on the stretched animal skin. On other vishaps, there are waves symbolizing water, which often come out of the mouth of the bull, long-legged birds, and rare snakes.

The three main types of vishaps are:

- Bull form (square, thick plate form, the front is mainly a bull's head and fallen down limbs image)
- Fish form (oval, carved in the shape of the fish, contains features unique to the fish anatomy)
- Fish-bull form (contains both of the forms)

Most of the vishap stones are found fallen down in a horizontal position, lying down. However, the three forms listed above are designed and carved on all sides. The tails of the fish forms of the vishap stones suggests that they were also once in a standing position.

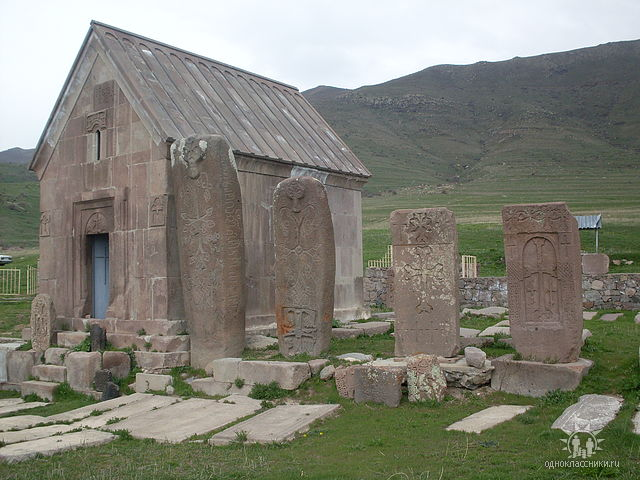
Aghavnadzor khatchkar transformed into two vishaps

The vishaps are monuments used to worship water, and are believed to have a close tie to water distribution. Almost all the vishaps are found in places related to mountain springs or canals. Similarly, there are irrigation systems found by Ashkharbek Kalantar at Mount Aragats, the Tokhmakagan backwaters of the Gegham mountains, Artanish Bay and near Gemerzek settlements. Although it is impossible to precisely date the irrigation systems, scientists have linked the vishaps to ancient fertility and water worship.

== Gallery ==
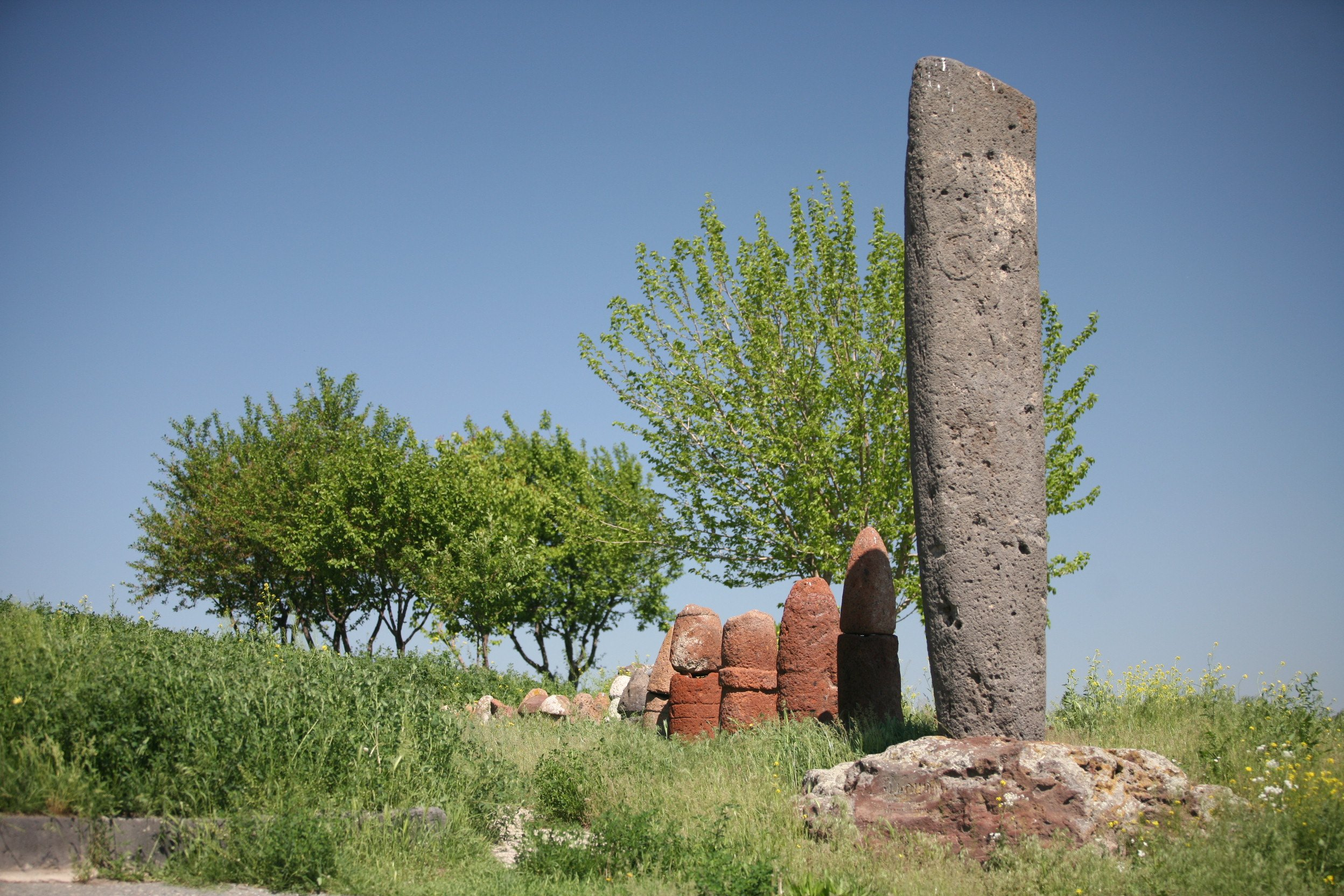
Vishapakar near Metsamor museum

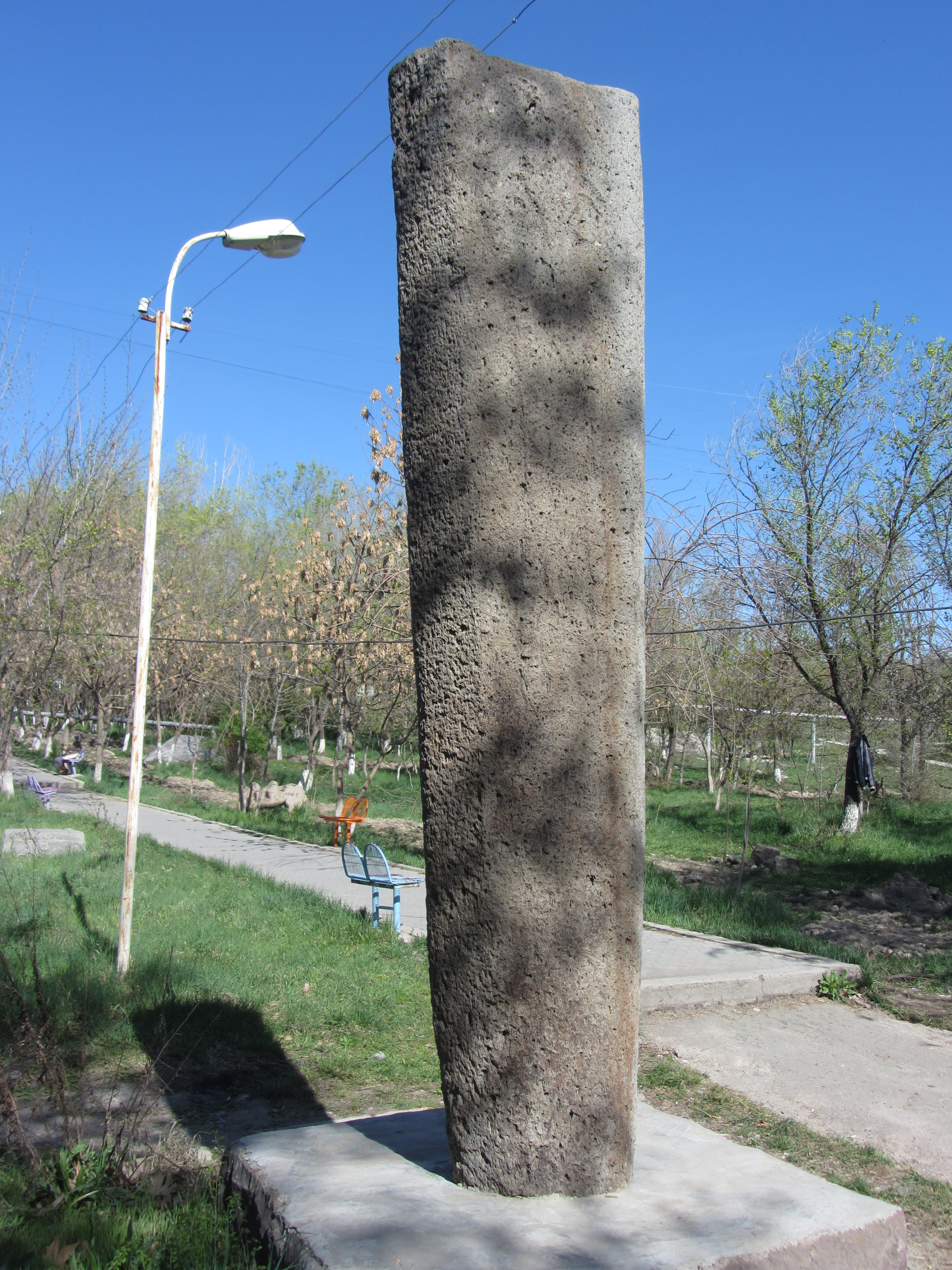
Vishapakar in Yerevan

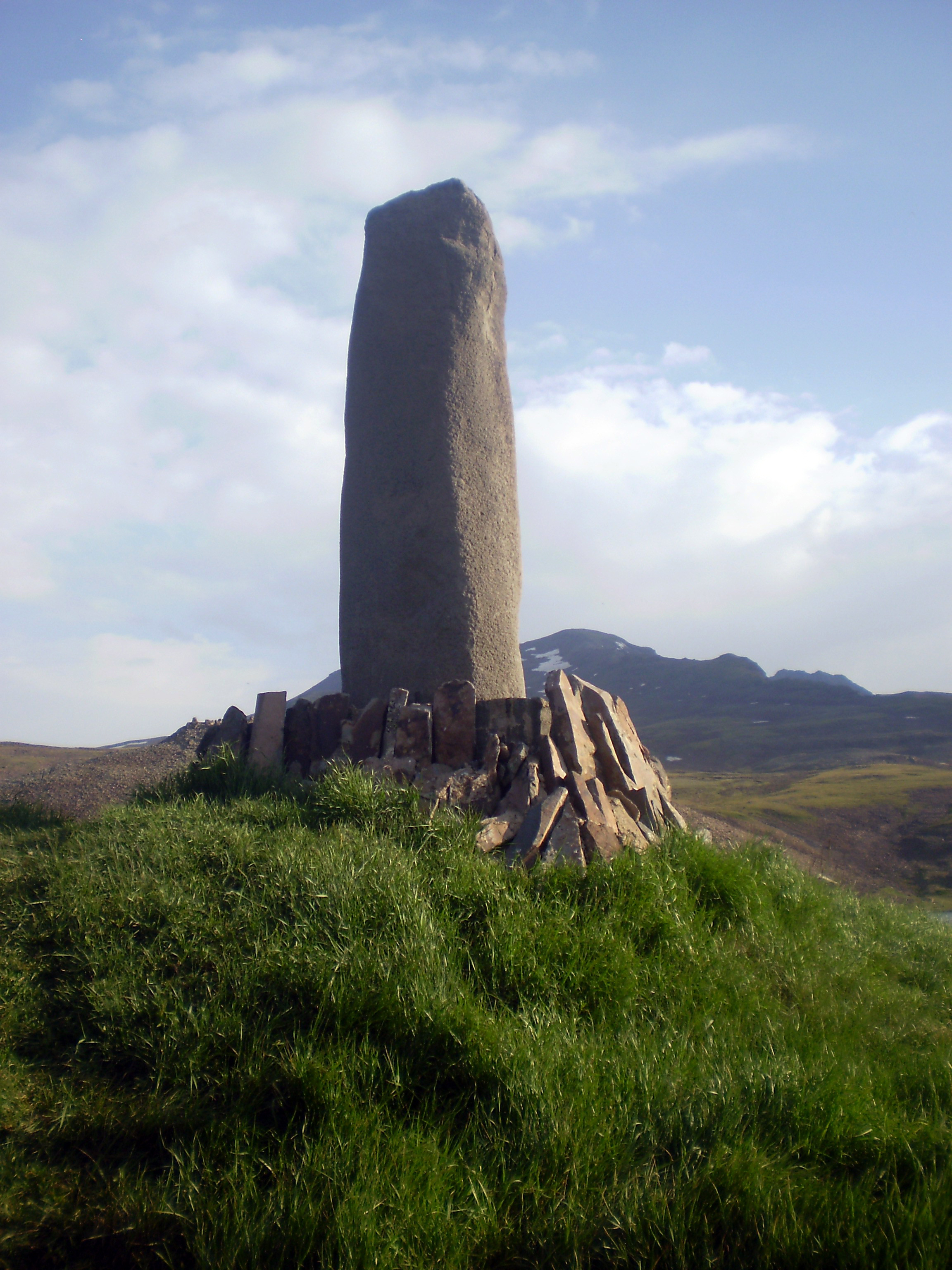
Vishapakar on Mount Aragats slope

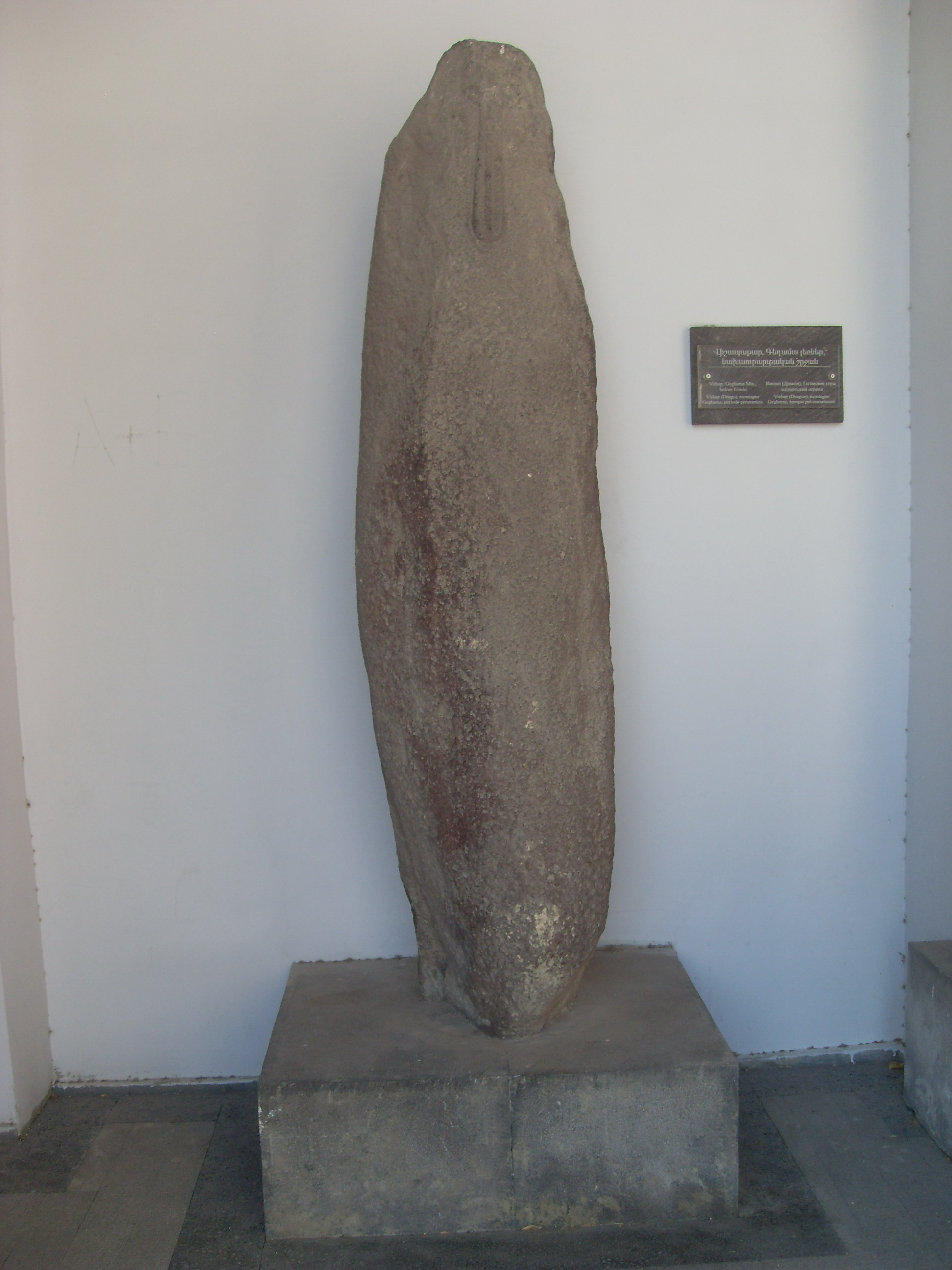
Vishapakar on the right side of the Matenadaran building

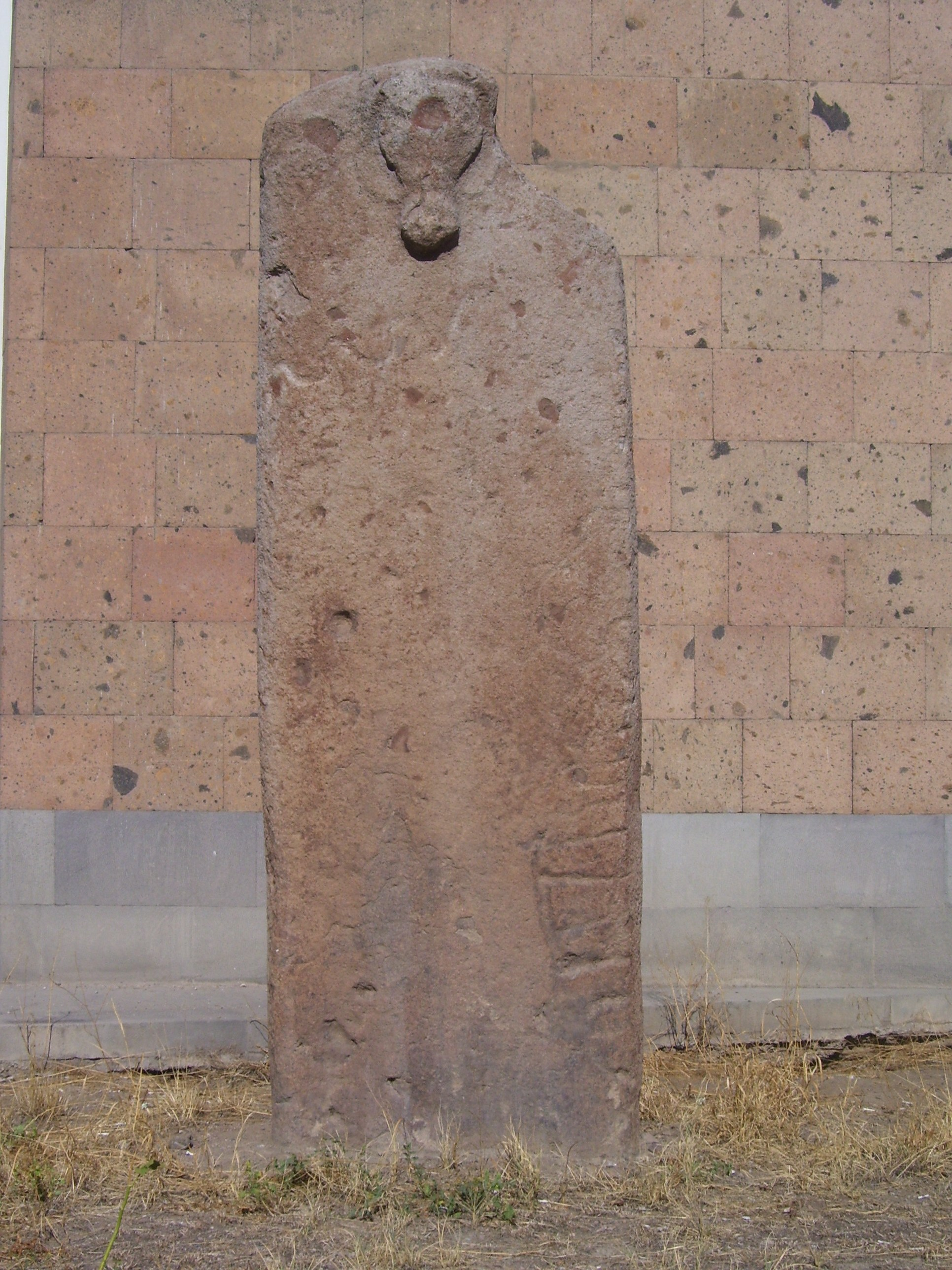
Vishap near Yerevan's third governmental building

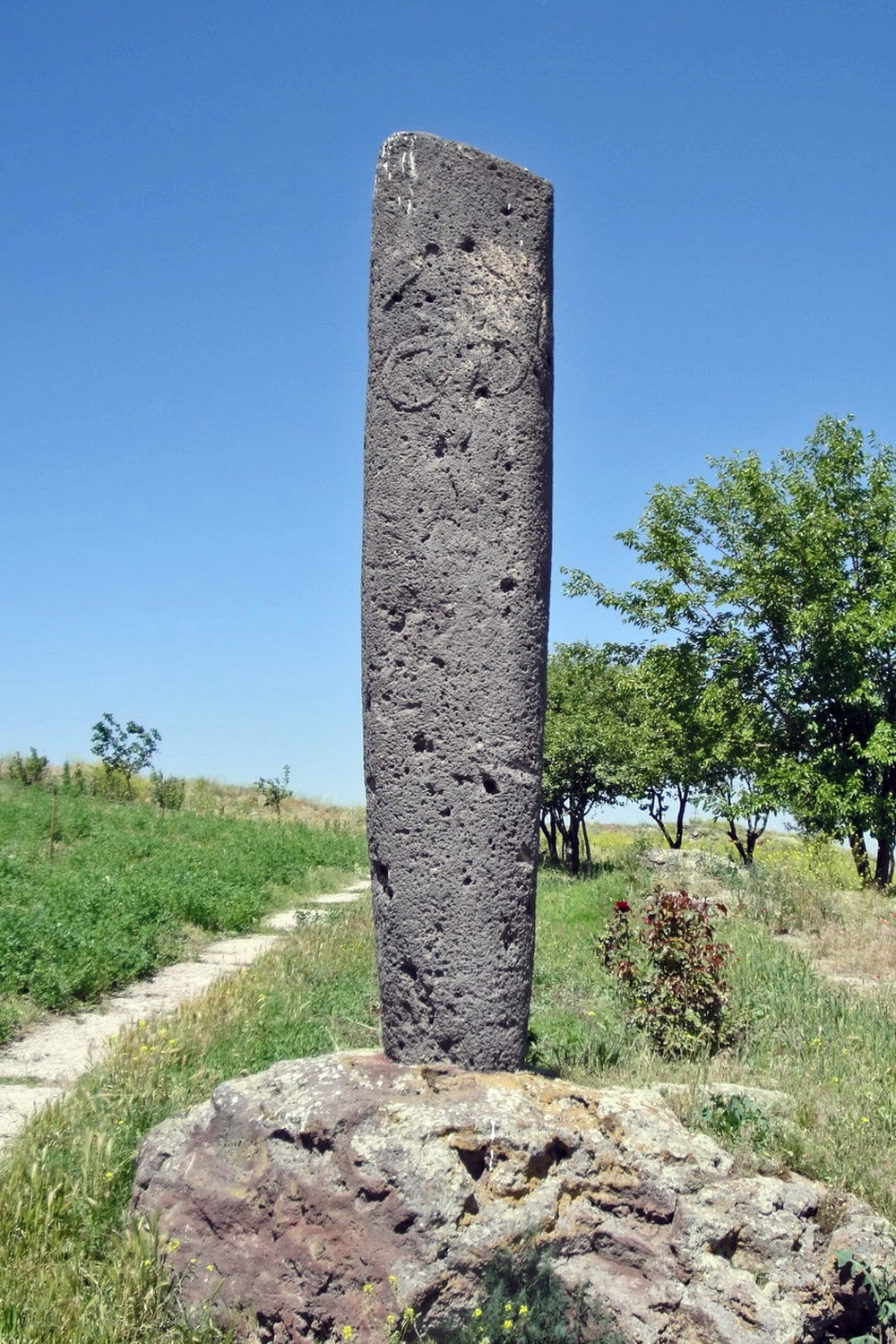

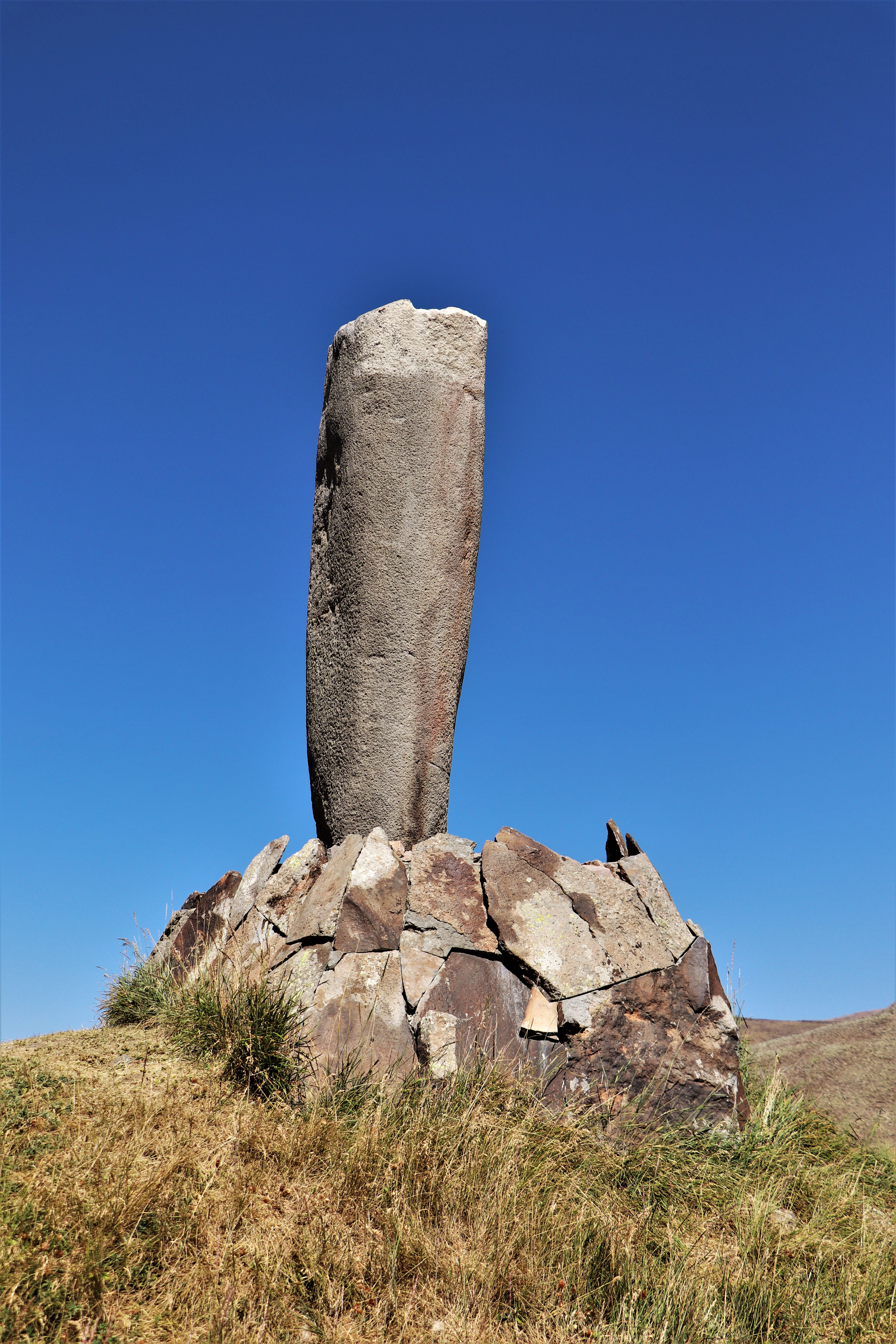

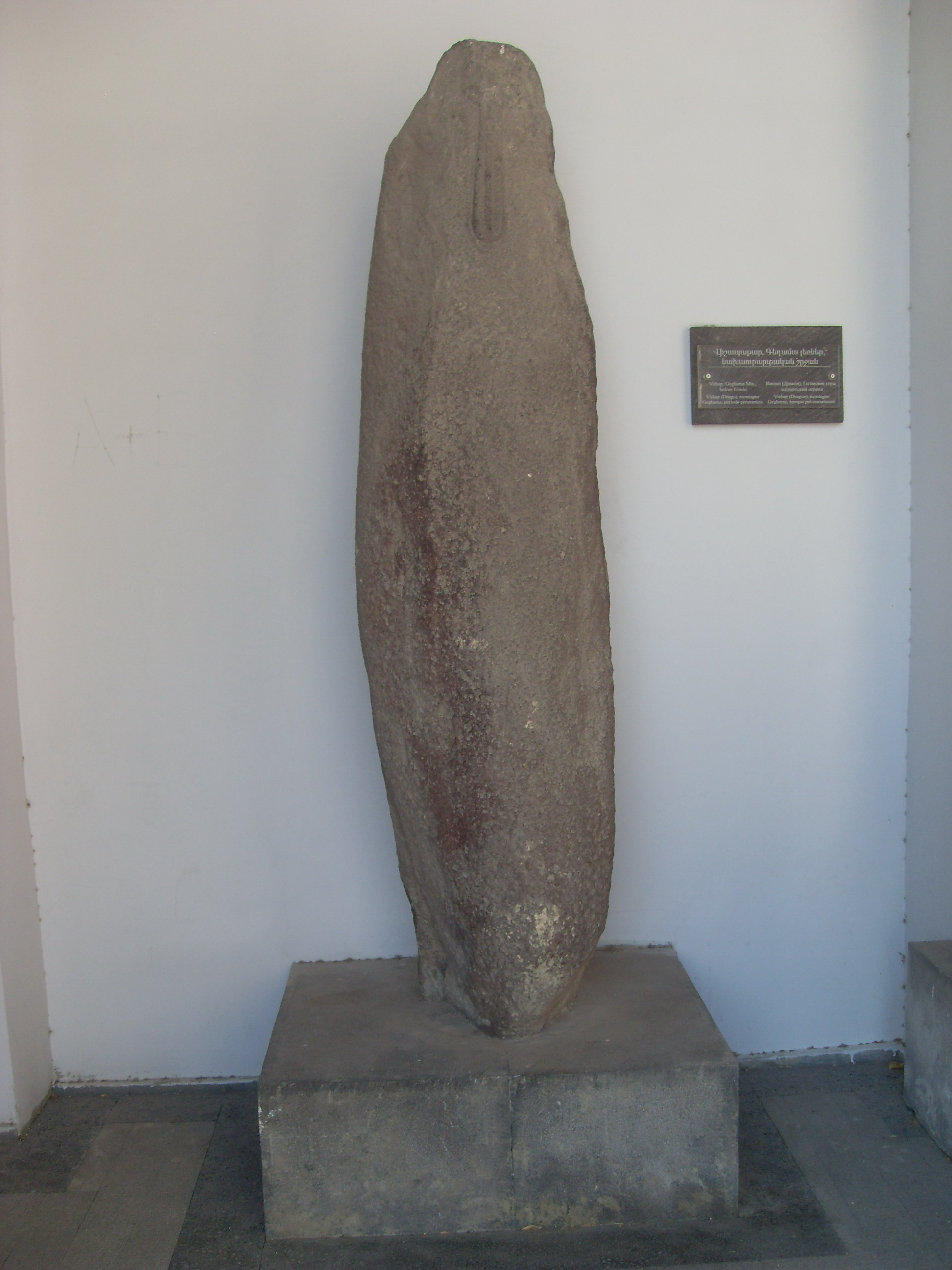

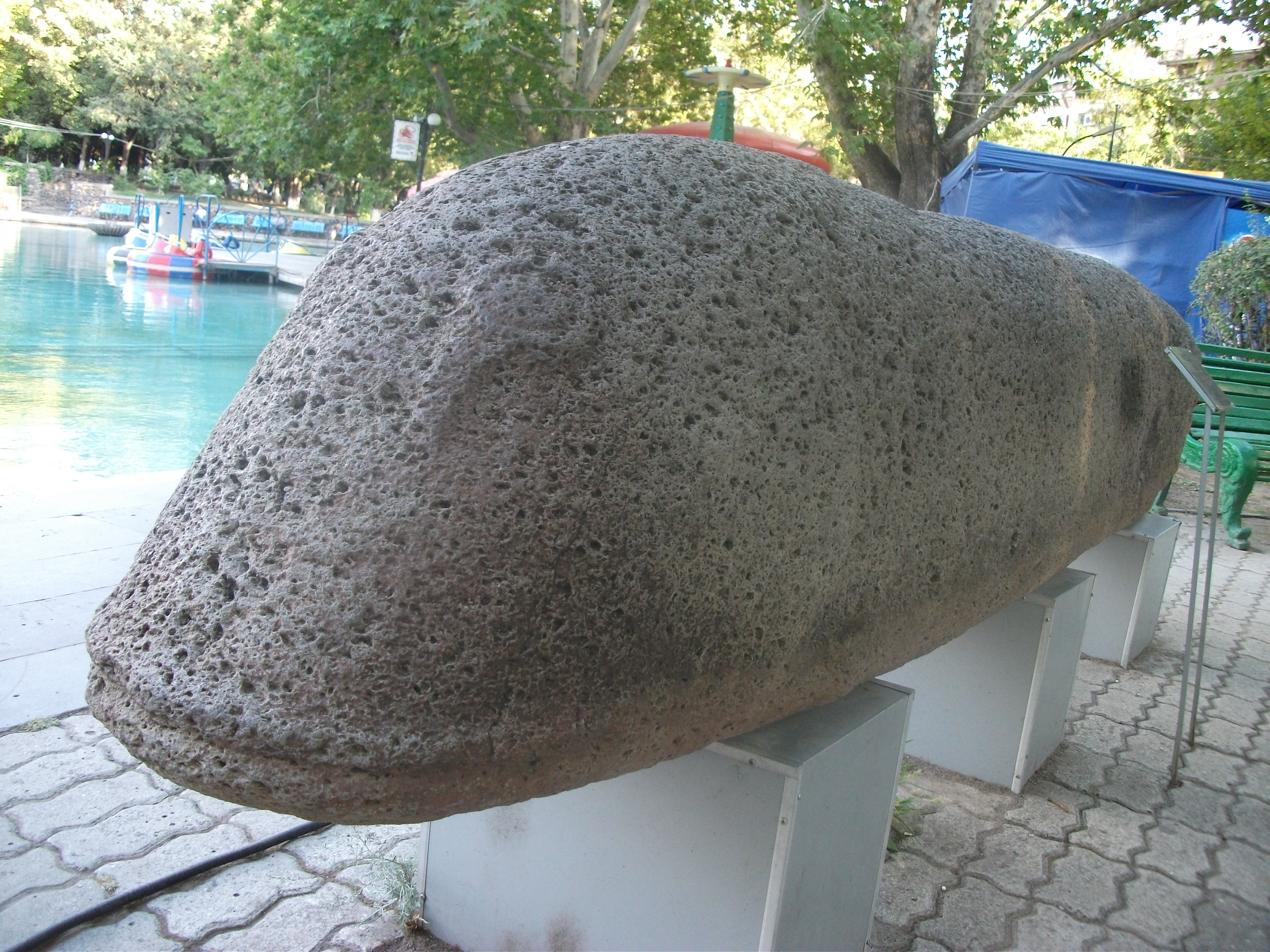

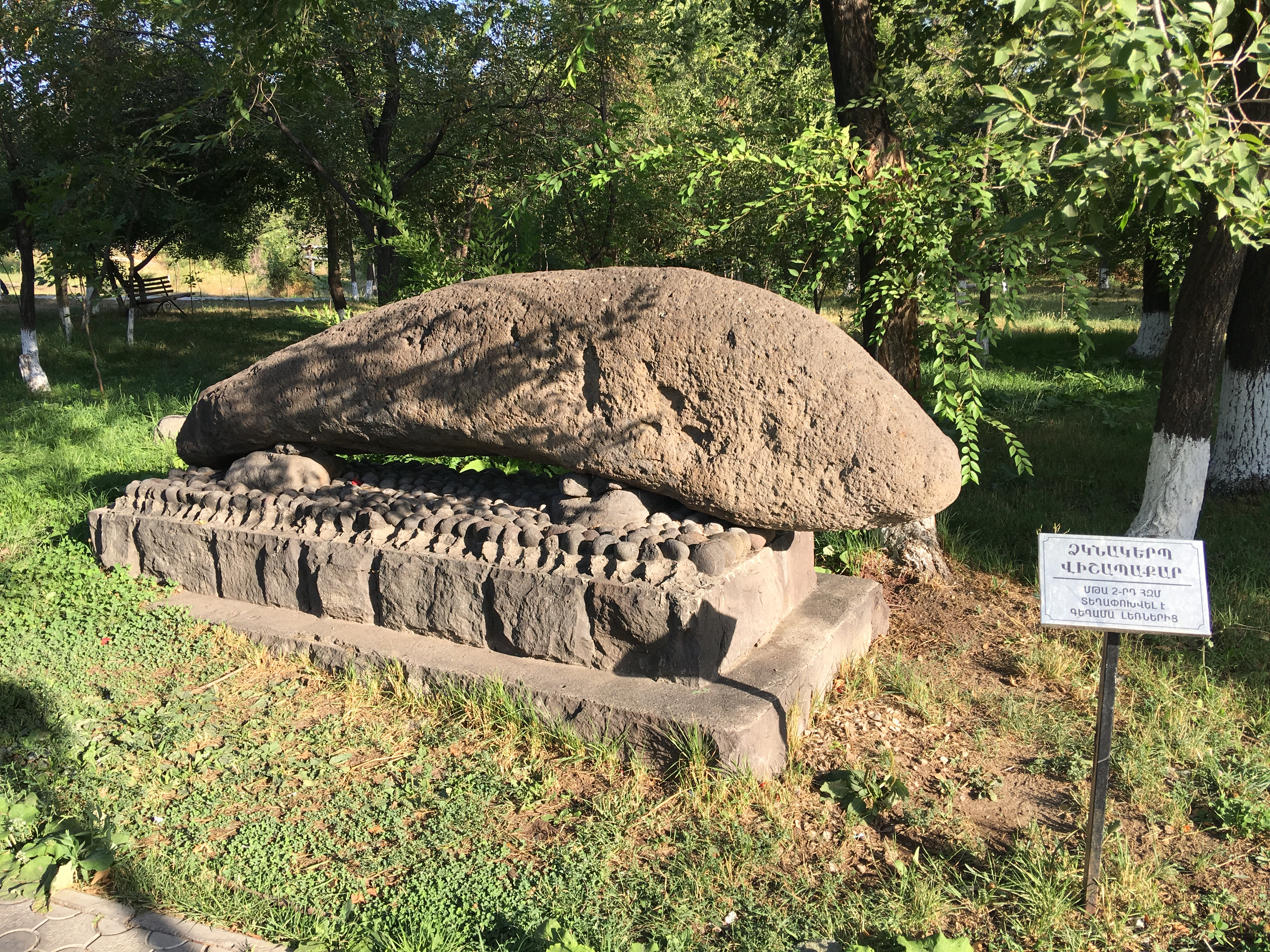

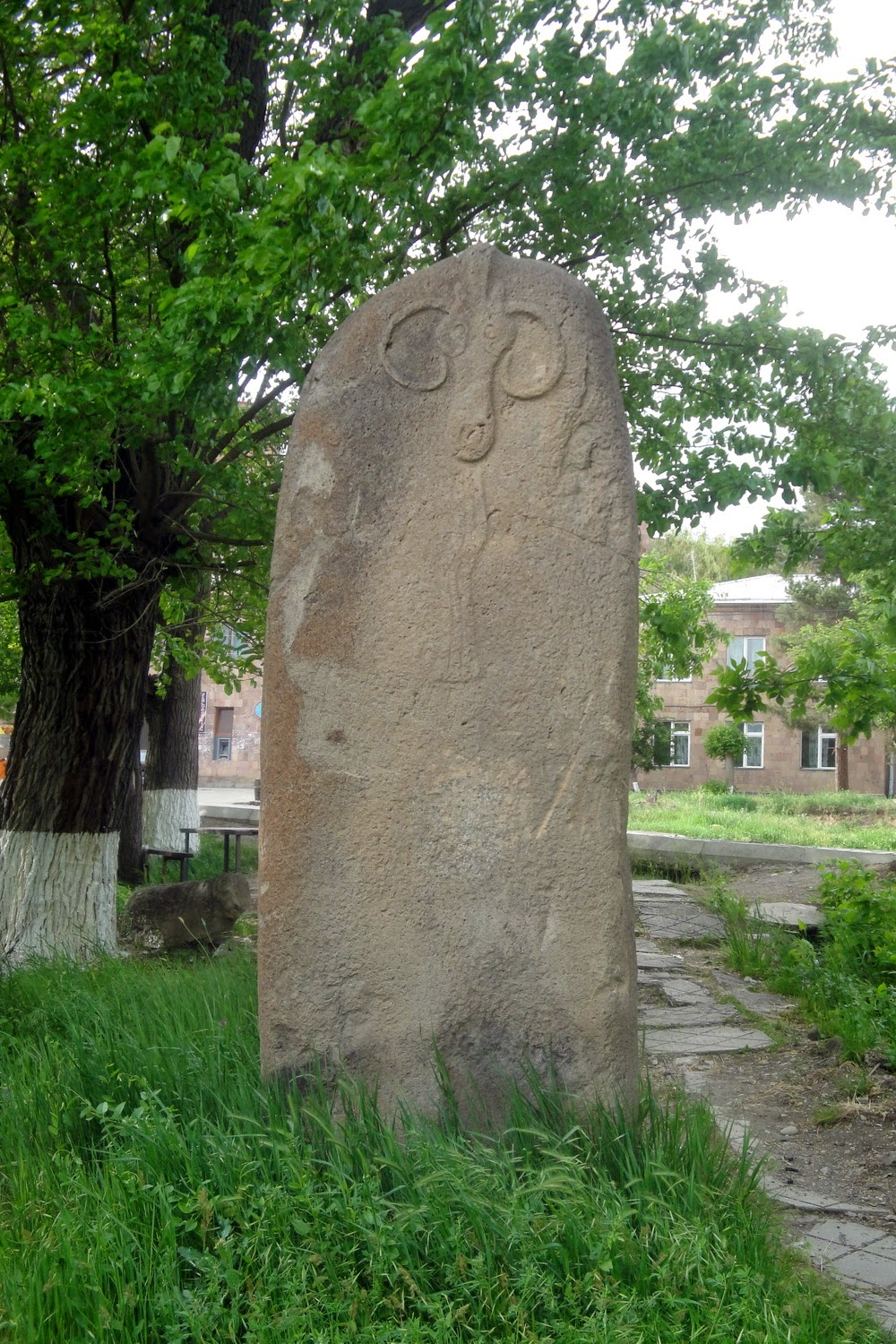

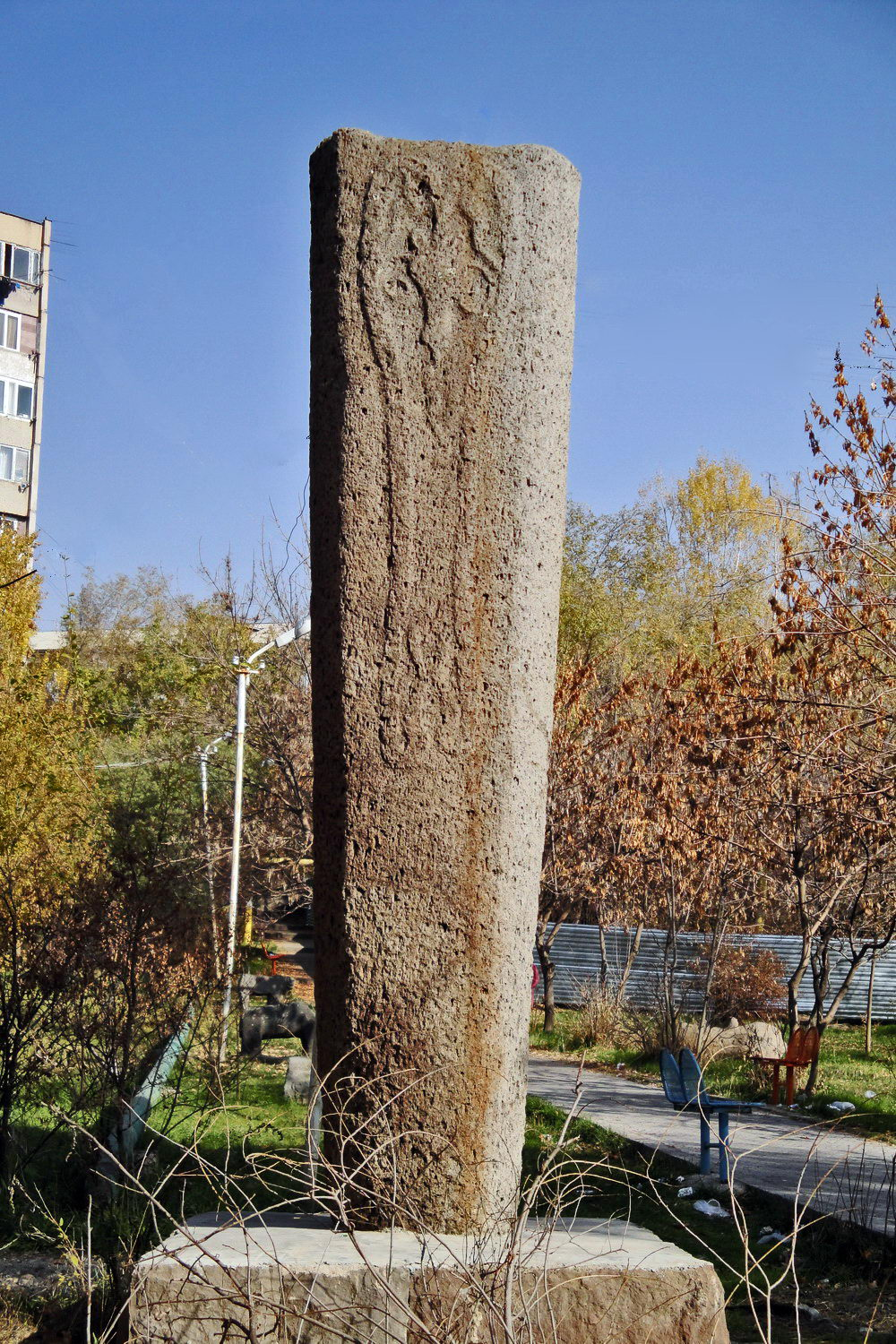

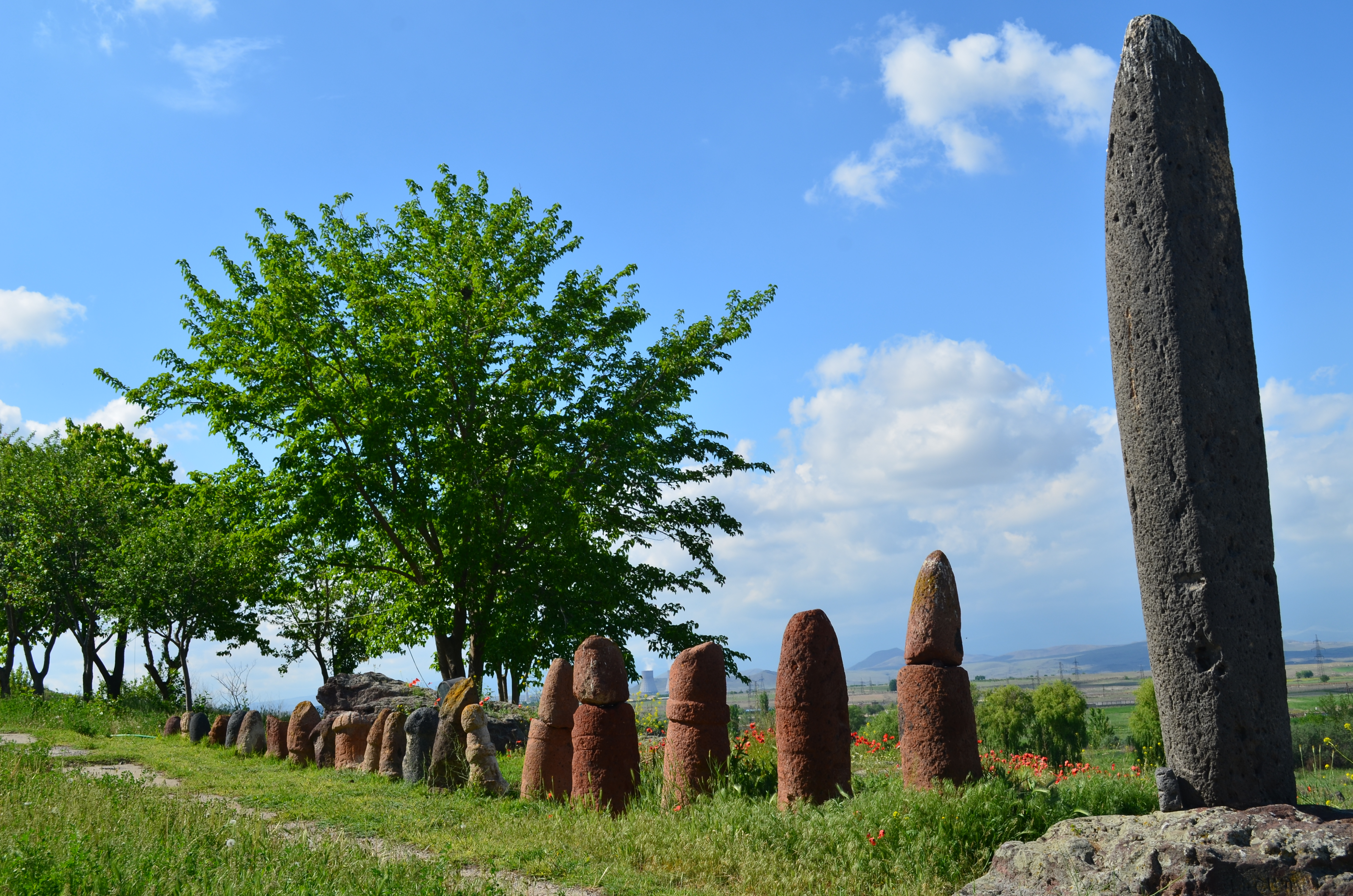
Vishapakar in Metsamor

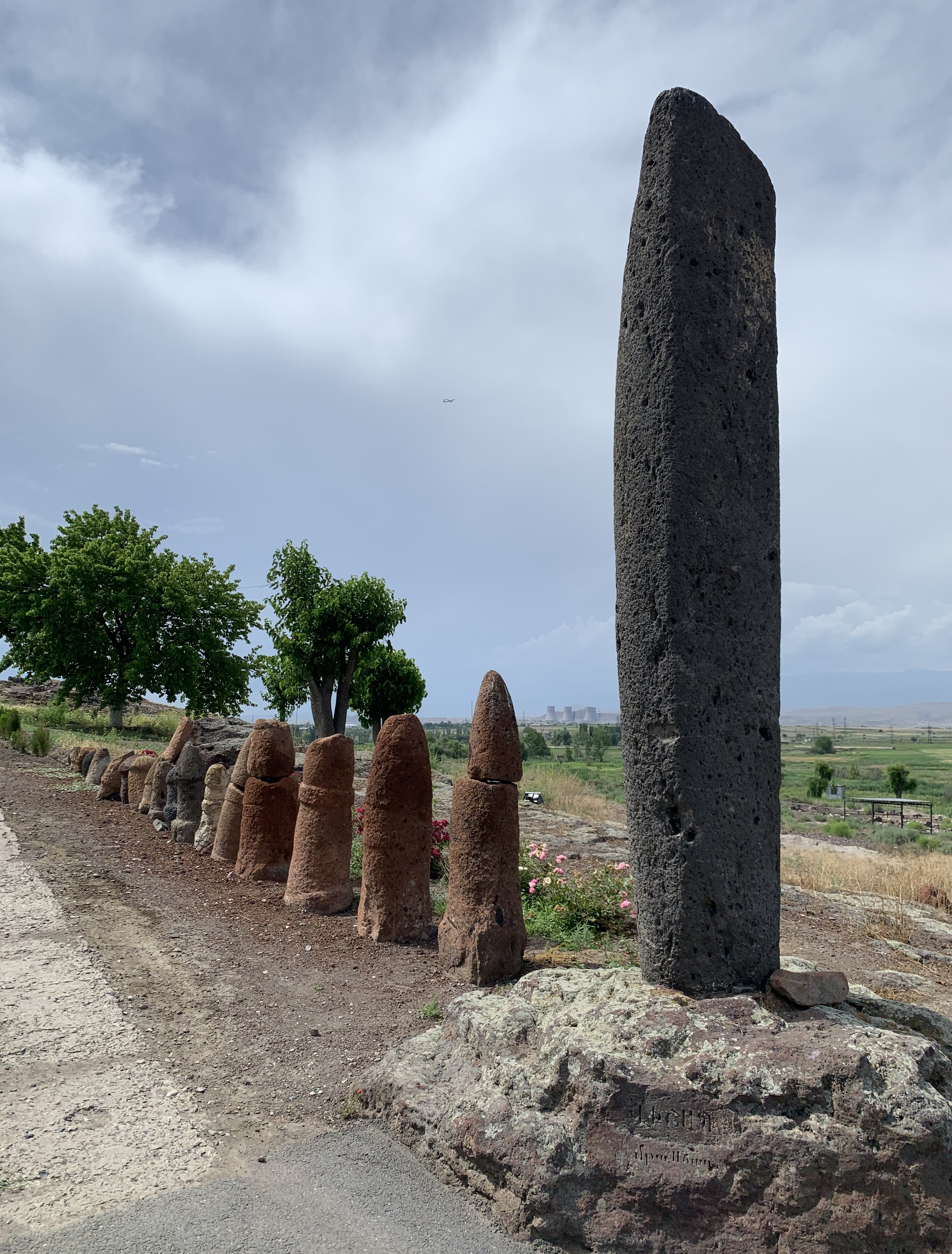

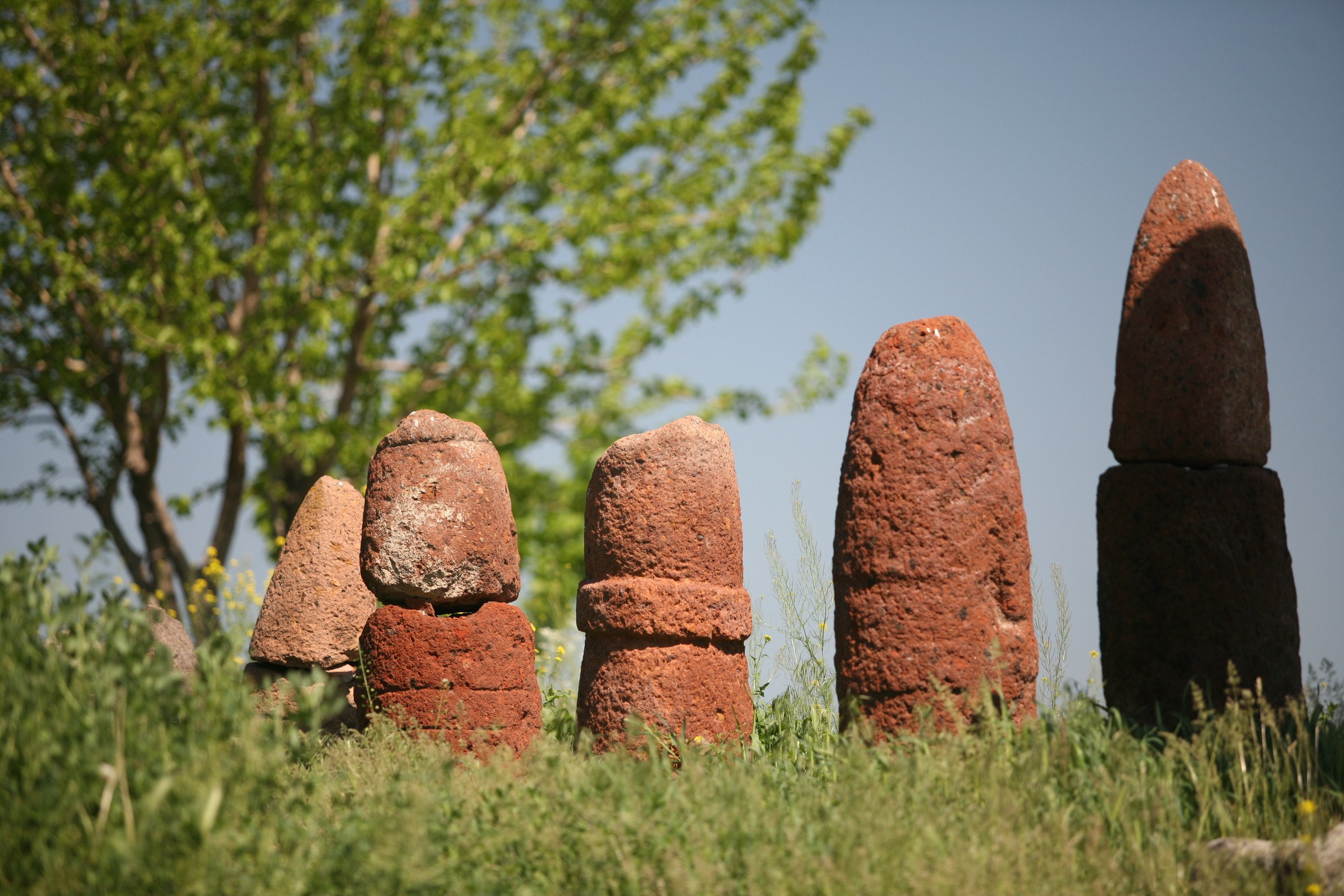

== Preservation ==
The Vishaps and the Cultural Landscape of Tirinkatar are nominated to UNESCO World Heritage site, and perhaps to be included in the list of UNESCO World Heritage sites.

== Cultural context ==
The prominent characteristics of the "vishaps" depicted as the Vishapakar are that they come from the "water" and they are "poisonous"; thus, they are described as "water dragons with poisonous saliva". The name might derive from an ancient Iranian term vi-šāpa, 'having poisonous juices', used in reference to snakes.

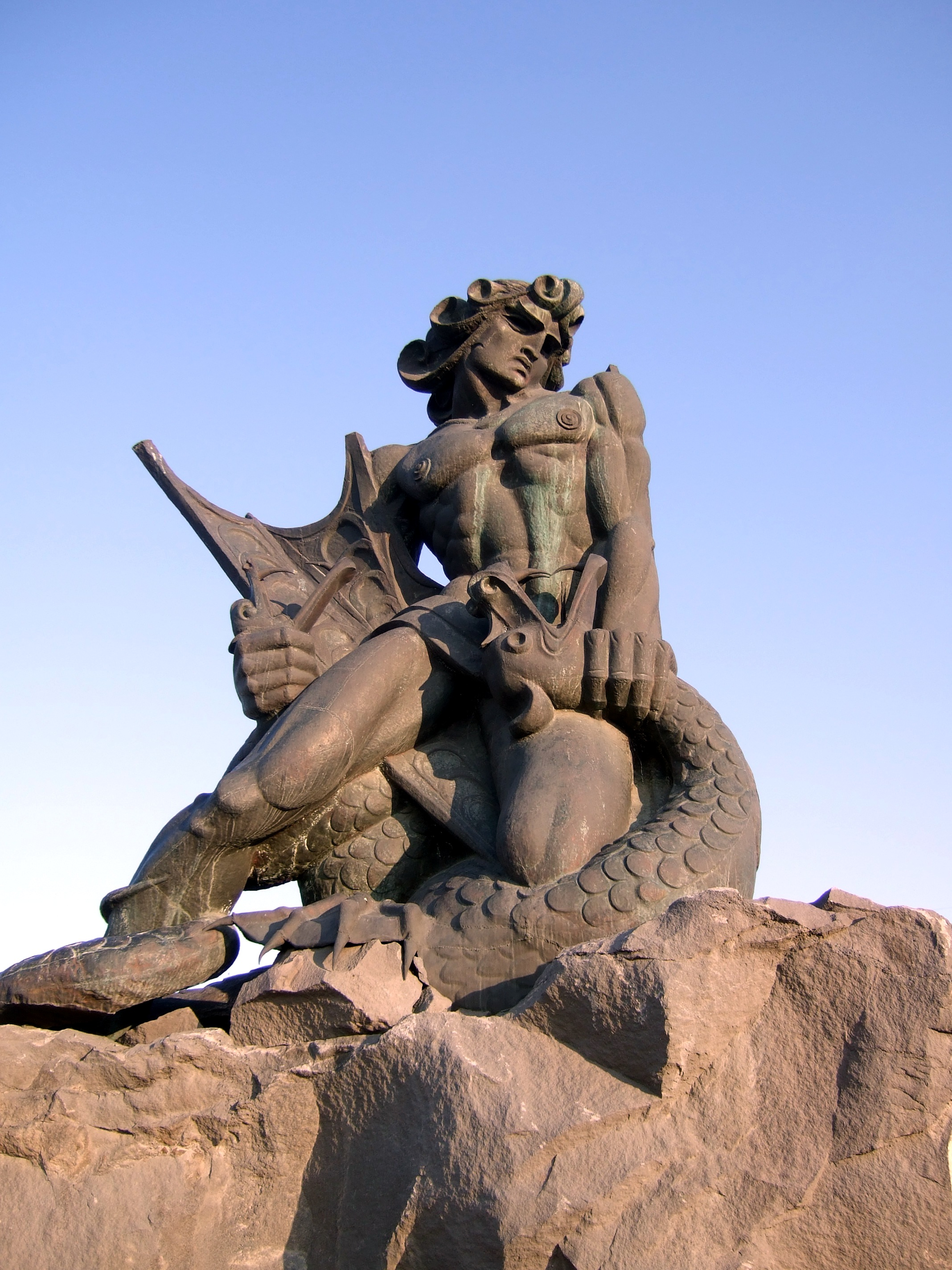
Vahagn the Dragon Slayer

Certain studies believe Vishap is foremost worshipped as water, rain and a rich-giving soul, whose tail is capable of creating canals and paths when it hits the Earth. Vishap is also seen as a monster who is a water source and guards treasure. Almost all the mythology explains divinity or god's hand as the cause of Vishap's death, which absorbed the water, the treasures that were guarded, and released the sacrificial virgins. Thus, old Egyptian myth regards Vishap as a power of darkness, who is defeated by the sun god Ra. As for Armenian myth, Vahagn, the dragon slayer, fights and wins the battle against Vishap. The Vishap battle myths have spread across the Armenian population as an old folk tale (for example, Tigran and Azhdahak, Daredevils of Sassoun). They have also had an influence in Christian literature. According to legend, Vishap's death and virgin sacrifice saves Saint George. Other legend says Vishap is presented as a Sun, who is a bad and destructive force, that the angels fight with (thunder as a symbol of the fight, the lightning as Archangel Gabriel's flashing sword, the sparks as a fiery arrow, and the rainbow as the bow).

According to Manuk Abeghian, Vishaps were donated to the Armenian goddess, Astghik. As for Grigor Ghapantsyan, they symbolize the dying and resurrecting god, Ara the Beautiful.

== See also ==
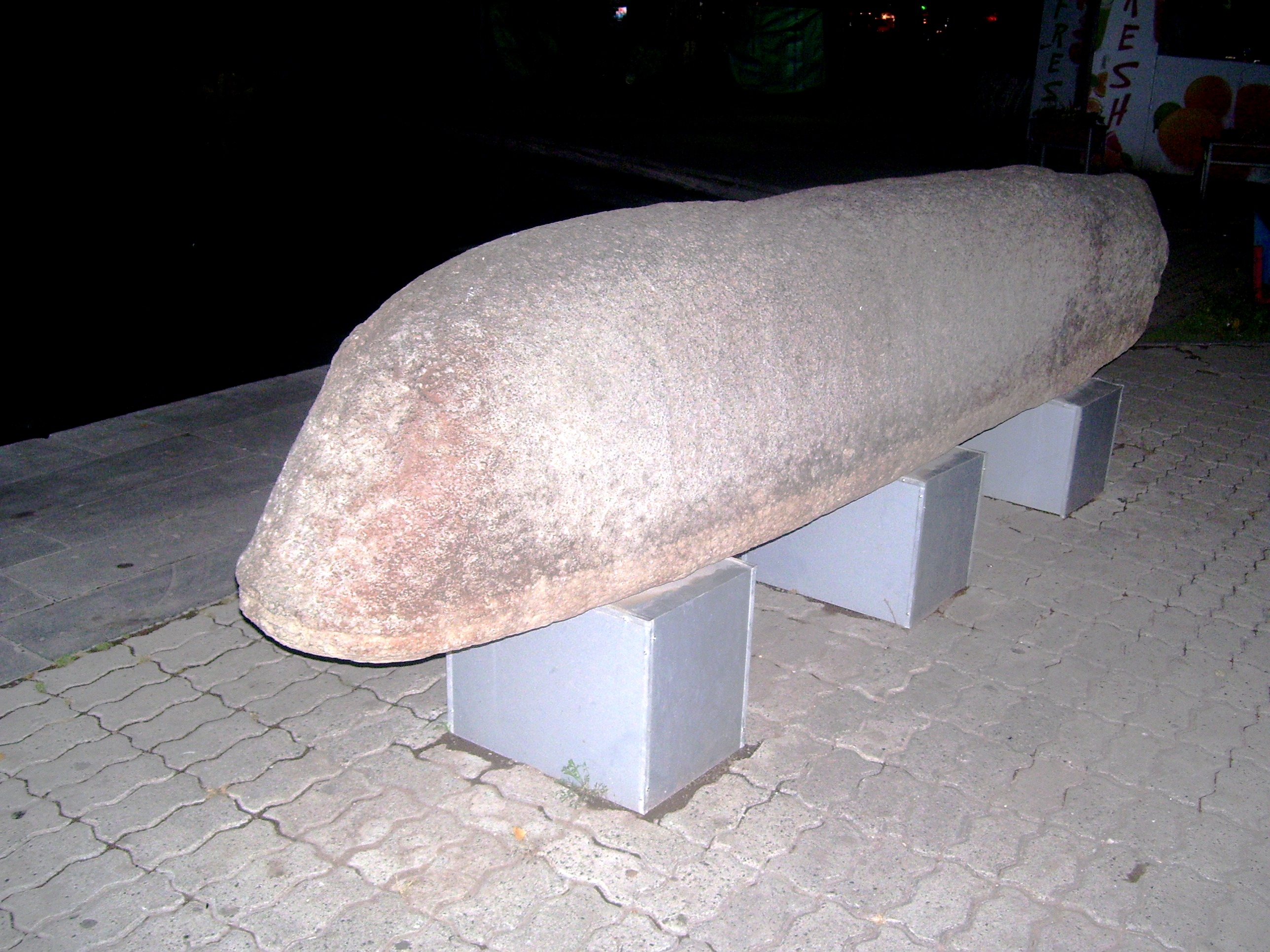
Yerevan's central vishap community

- Azhdahak
- Cromlêh
- Dolmen
- Khachkar
- Menhir
- Obelisk
- Stele

== Literature ==
- Пиотровский Б.Б. Вишапы. Каменные статуи в горах Армении, Издание Армянского филиала АН СССР, Ленинград, 1939 (in Russian)
- Аракелян Б.Н., Арутюнян Н.В. Находка урартской надписи в Гарни // Историко-филологический журнал Армянской ССР, № 2, 1966 (in Russian)
- Марр Н.Я., Смирнов Я.И. Вишапы // Труды Государственной Академии Истории Материальной Культуры, т. I, Ленинград, 1931 (in Russian)
- Мещанинов И.И. Каменные статуи рыб – вишапы на Кавказе и в Северной Монголии // Записки Коллегии Востоковедов, I, Ленинград, 1926 (in Russian)
- Мифологический словарь/ Гл. ред. Е. М. Мелетинский. — М.:Советская энциклопедия, 1990. — 672 с. (in Russian)
- Абегян М. Армянский эпический фольклор, Труды, т. I. Ер., 1966. с. 85–86, на арм. яз. (in Russian)
- Վիշապ քարակոթողները, Խմբ. Ա. Պետրոսյան, Ա. Բոբոխյան, Գիտություն, Երևան, 2015, 420 էջ
